= 2017 Japanese general election in Hokkaido =

- October 22, 2017

All 20 seats to the House of Representatives
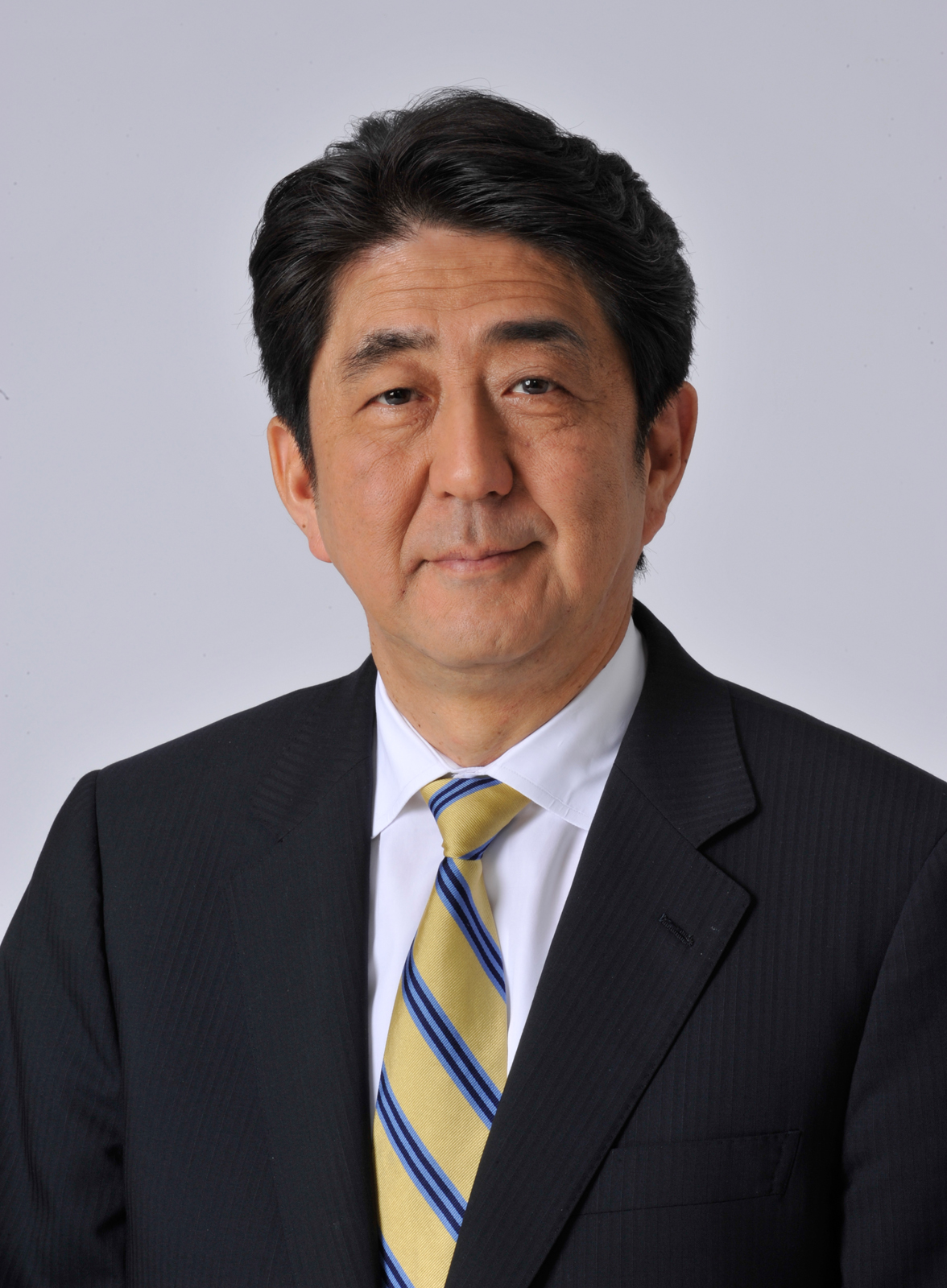

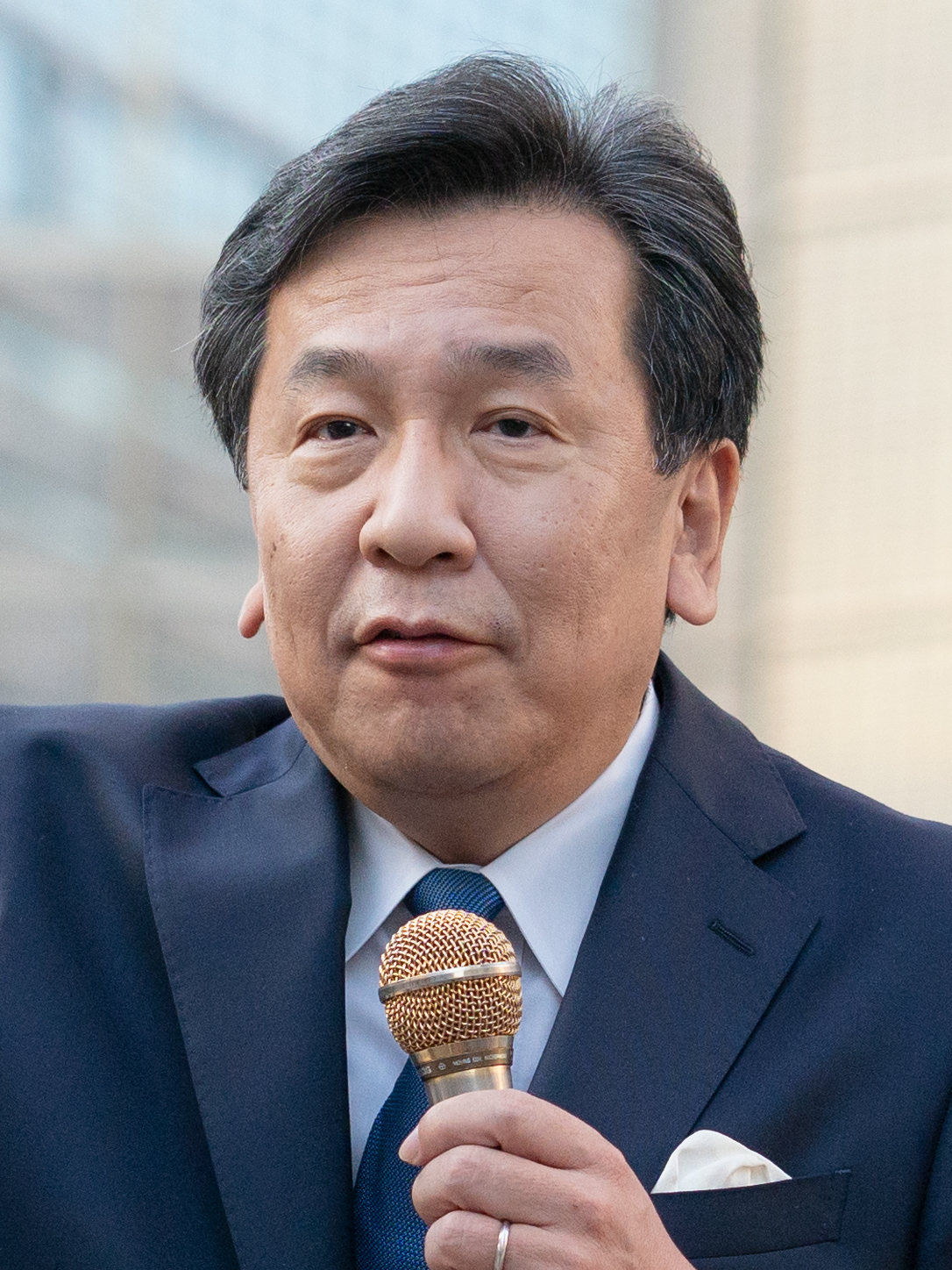

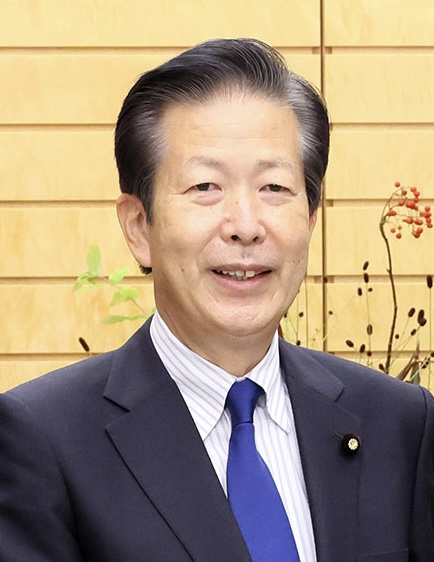

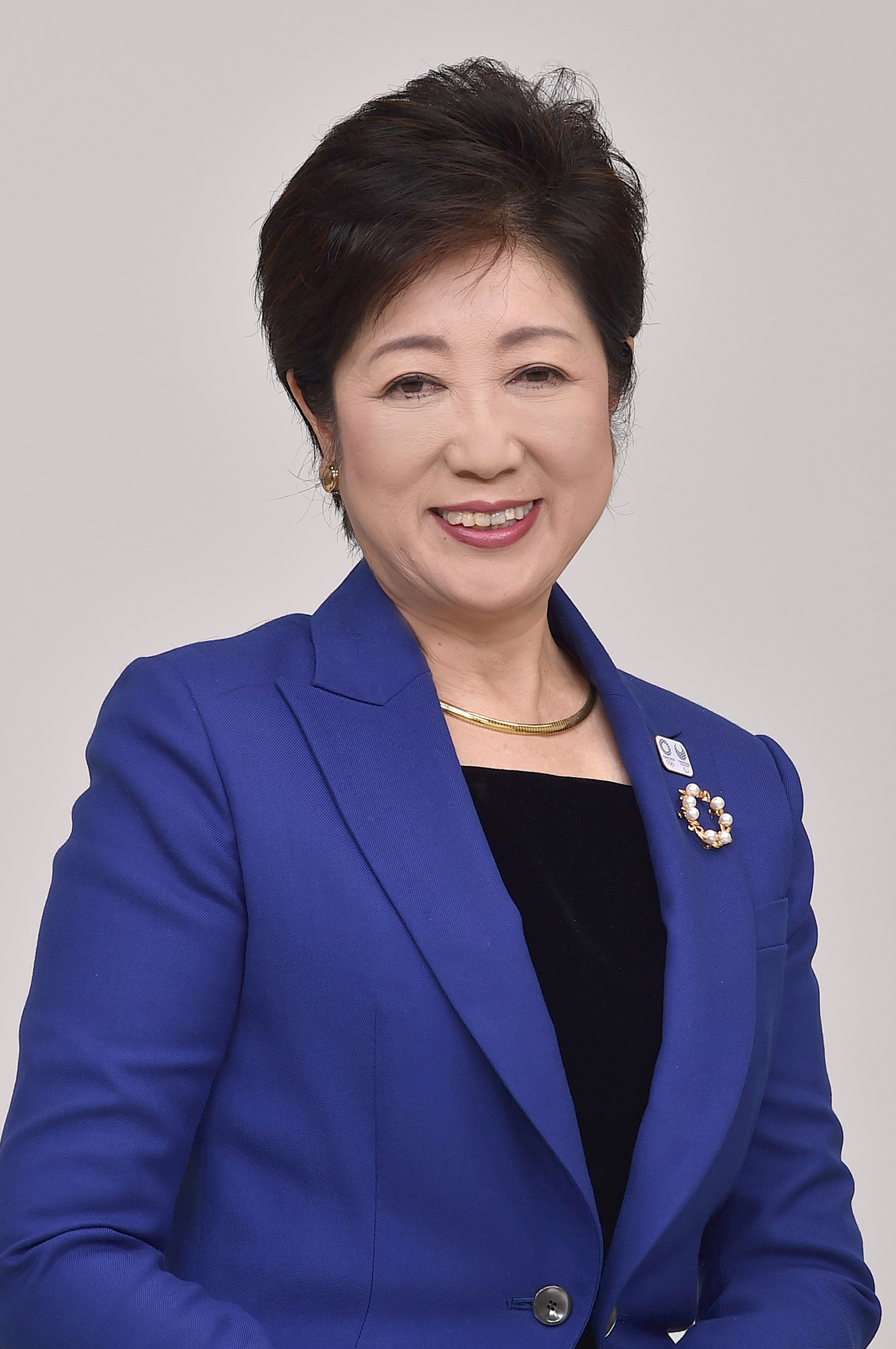
	Majority party	Minority party	Third party
Party	LDP	CDP	Komeito
Last election	11 seats	-	2 seats
Constituency	6	5	1
Constituency votes	1,189,763	963,936	96,795
PR seats	3	3	1
Popular votes	779,903	714,032	298,573
Total	9	8	2
Seat change	▼2	New	Steady
	Fourth party
Party	Kibō no Tō
Last election	-
Constituency	0
Constituency votes	253,108
PR seats	1
Popular votes	331,463
Total	1
Seat change	New

The 2017 Japanese general election in Hokkaido were held on October 22, 2017, to elect the 20 representatives, one from each of 12 Electoral districts and 8 proportional seats.

== Results summary ==
Constituency	2014 result	2017 winning party				Votes							
Constituency	2014 result	Party	Votes	Share	Majority	LDP	Komeito	CDP	Kibō	JCP	Ishin	Others (Note: Includes all other parties)	Total
District 1	DPJ	CDP	139,110	53.48%	18,123	120,987		139,110					
District 2	LDP	LDP	104,824	41.35%	30,399	104,824			74,425	52,626	21,643		
District 3	LDP	CDP	141,680	54.36%	22,719	118,961		141,680					
District 4	LDP	LDP	104,054	45.92%	13,435	104,054		90,619	31,941				
District 5	LDP	LDP	142,687	49.84%	6,739	142,687		135,948				7,632	
District 6	DPJ	CDP	136,312	54.49%	22,461	113,851		136,312					
District 7	LDP	LDP	95,200	66.60%	47,460	95,200				47,740			
District 8	DPJ	CDP	125,771	55.40%	24,528	101,243		125,771					
District 9	LDP	LDP	108,747	46.75%	20,427	108,747			88,320	35,543			
District 10	NKP	NKP	96,795	50.13%	513		96,795	96,282					
District 11	LDP	CDP	98,214	54.47%	16,118	82,096		98,214					
District 12	LDP	LDP	97,113	54.14%	38,691	97,113			58,422	23,830			

== Hokkaido 1st district ==
2017 Hokkaido 1st district election
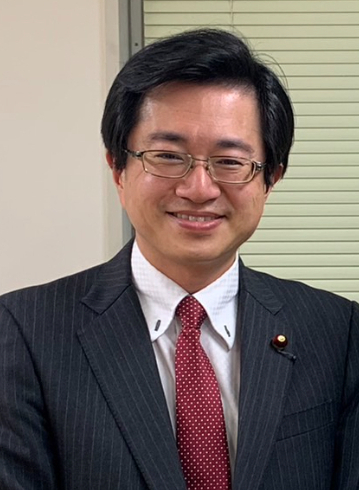

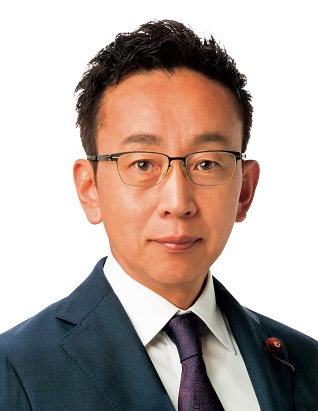
Nominee	Daiki Michishita	Toshimitsu Funahashi
Party	CDP	LDP
Popular vote	139,110	120,987
Percentage	53.48%	46.52%
Japanese Representative before election
Takahiro Yokomichi
Democratic
Elected Japanese Representative
Daiki Michishita
CDP

Incumbent				Elected Member	
Member	Party	First elected	Status	Member	Party
Takahiro Yokomichi	DP	1969	Incumbent retired. CDP pick up.	Daiki Michishita	CDP

== Hokkaido 2nd district ==
2017 Hokkaido 2nd district election
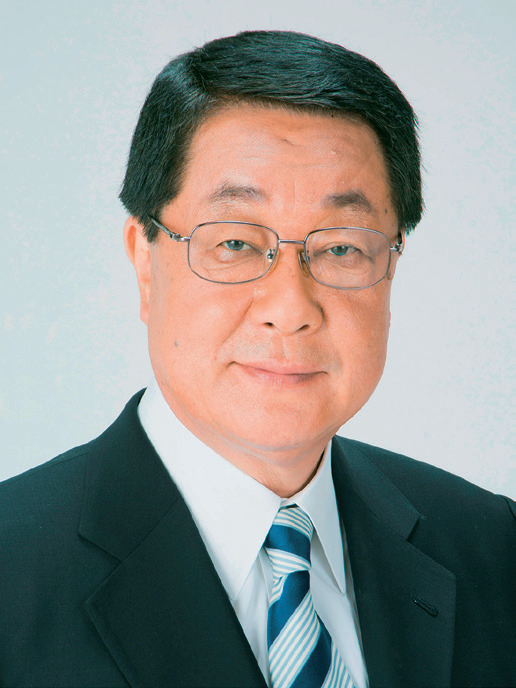

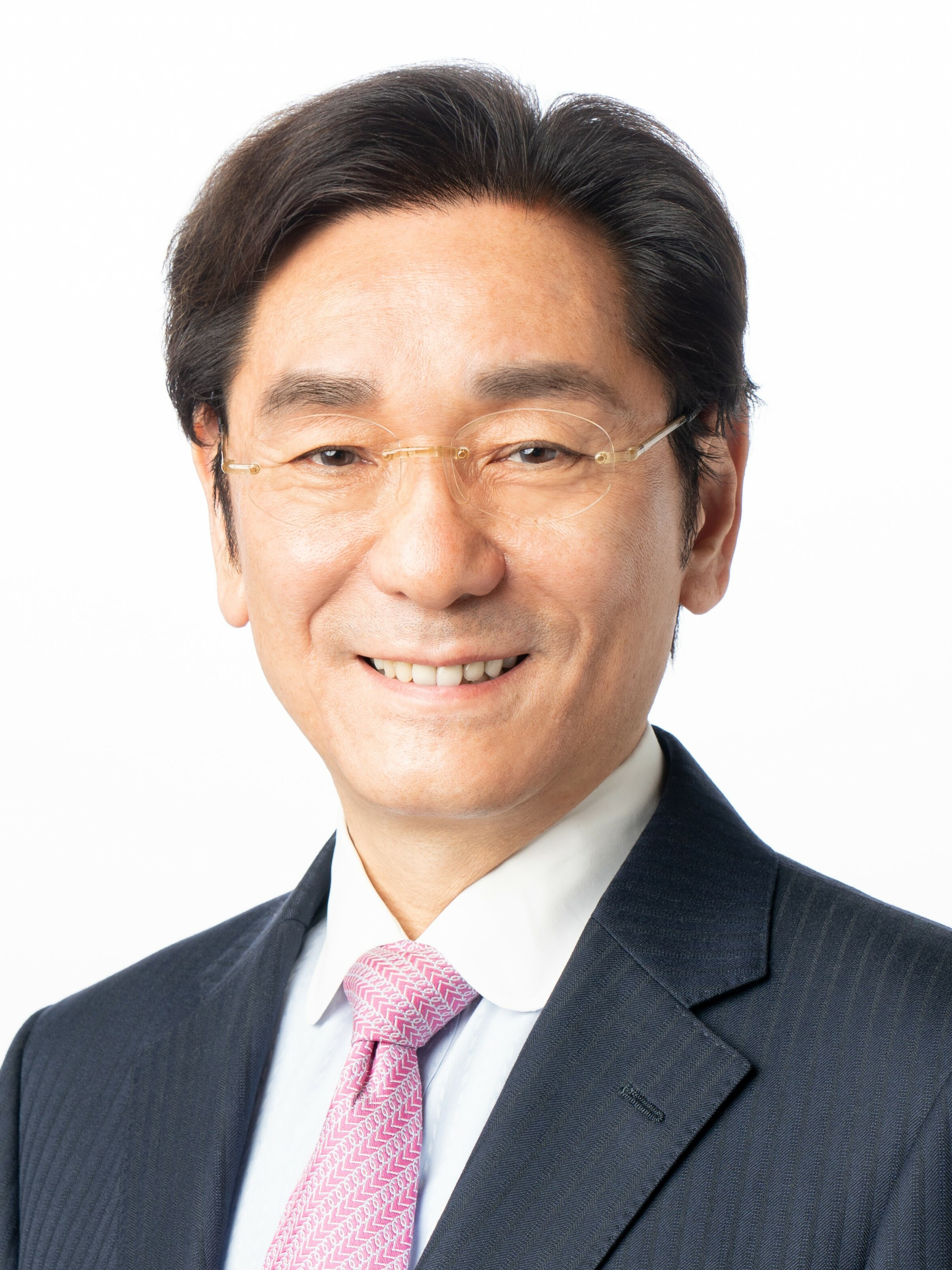
Nominee	Takamori Yoshikawa	Kenko Matsuki	Masatoshi Kanakura
Party	LDP	Kibō no Tō	JCP
Popular vote	104,824	74,425	52,626
Percentage	41.35%	29.36%	20.76%
Japanese Representative before election
Takamori Yoshikawa
LDP
Elected Japanese Representative
Takamori Yoshikawa
LDP

Incumbent				Elected Member	
Member	Party	First elected	Status	Member	Party
Takamori Yoshikawa	LDP	1996	Incumbent reelected.	Takamori Yoshikawa	LDP

== Hokkaido 3rd district ==
2017 Hokkaido 3rd district election
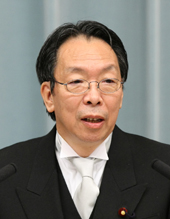

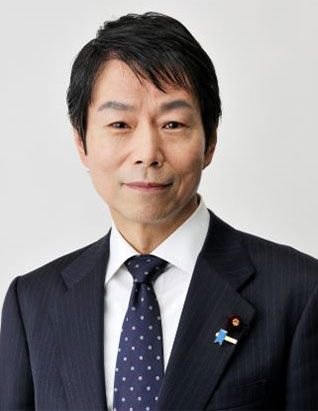
Nominee	Satoshi Arai	Hirohisa Takagi
Party	CDP	LDP
Popular vote	141,680	118,961
Percentage	54.36%	45.64%
Japanese Representative before election
Hirohisa Takagi
LDP
Elected Japanese Representative
Satoshi Arai
CDP

Incumbent				Elected Member	
Member	Party	First elected	Status	Member	Party
Hirohisa Takagi	LDP	2012	Incumbent defeated.	Satoshi Arai	CDP

== Hokkaido 4th district ==
2017 Hokkaido 4th district election
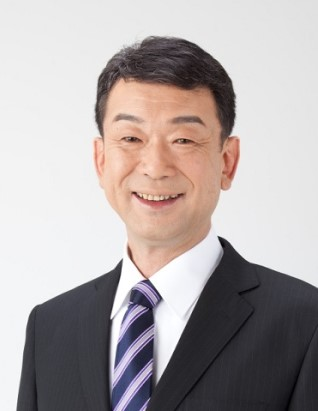

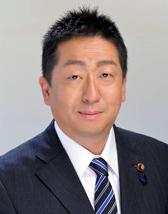
Nominee	Hiroyuki Nakamura	Hiranao Honda	Miho Takahashi
Party	LDP	CDP	Kibō no Tō
Popular vote	104,054	90,619	31,941
Percentage	45.92%	39.99%	14.09%
Japanese Representative before election
Hiroyuki Nakamura
LDP
Elected Japanese Representative
Hiroyuki Nakamura
LDP

Incumbent				Elected Member	
Member	Party	First elected	Status	Member	Party
Hiroyuki Nakamura	LDP	2012	Incumbent reelected.	Hiroyuki Nakamura	LDP

== Hokkaido 5th district ==
2017 Hokkaido 5th district election
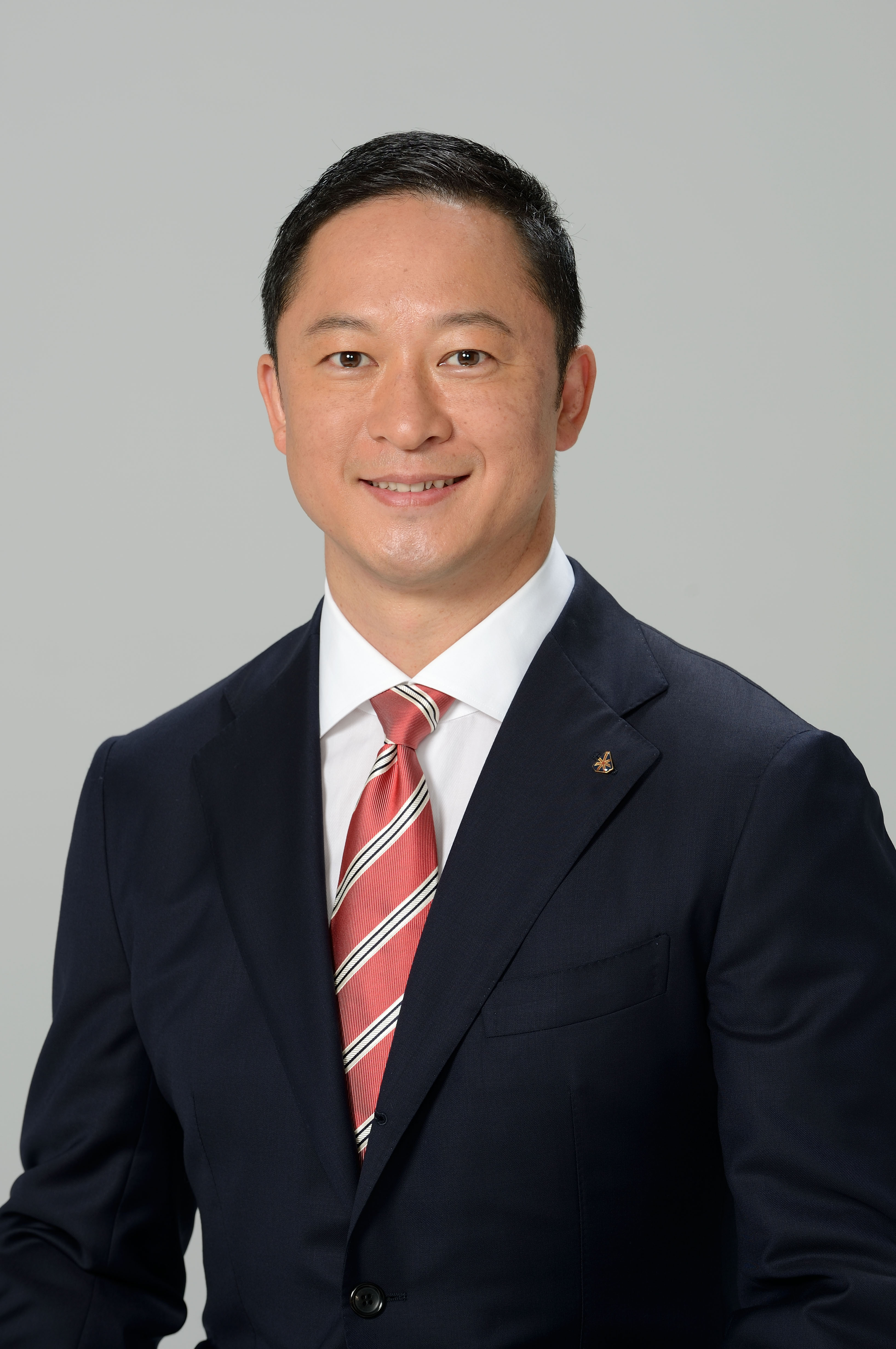

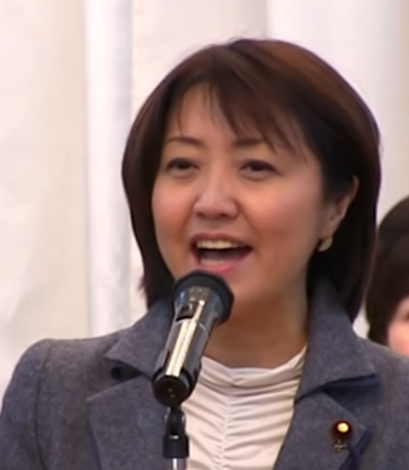
Nominee	Yoshiaki Wada	Maki Ikeda
Party	LDP	CDP
Popular vote	142,687	135,948
Percentage	49.84%	47.49%
Japanese Representative before election
Yoshiaki Wada
LDP
Elected Japanese Representative
Yoshiaki Wada
LDP

Incumbent				Elected Member	
Member	Party	First elected	Status	Member	Party
Yoshiaki Wada	LDP	2016 (by-el)	Incumbent reelected.	Yoshiaki Wada	LDP

== Hokkaido 6th district ==
2017 Hokkaido 6th district election
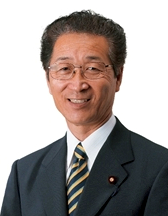

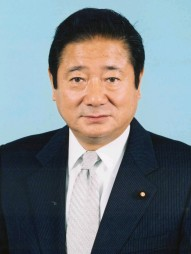
Nominee	Takahiro Sasaki	Hiroshi Imazu
Party	CDP	LDP
Popular vote	136,312	113,851
Percentage	54.49%	45.51%
Japanese Representative before election
Takahiro Sasaki
CDP
Elected Japanese Representative
Takahiro Sasaki
CDP

Incumbent				Elected Member	
Member	Party	First elected	Status	Member	Party
Takahiro Sasaki	CDP	2005	Incumbent reelected.	Takahiro Sasaki	CDP

== Hokkaido 7th district ==
2017 Hokkaido 7th district election
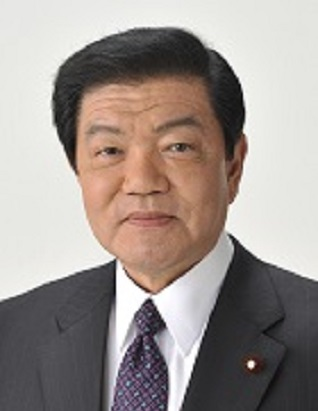
Nominee	Yoshitaka Itō	Akemi Ishikawa
Party	LDP	JCP
Popular vote	95,200	47,740
Percentage	66.60%	33.40%
Japanese Representative before election
Yoshitaka Itō
LDP
Elected Japanese Representative
Yoshitaka Itō
LDP

Incumbent				Elected Member	
Member	Party	First elected	Status	Member	Party
Yoshitaka Itō	LDP	2009	Incumbent reelected.	Yoshitaka Itō	LDP

== Hokkaido 8th district ==
2017 Hokkaido 8th district election
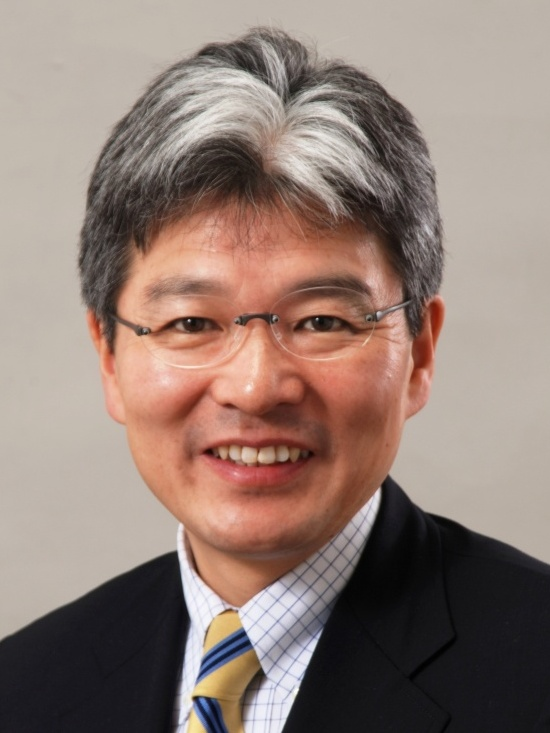

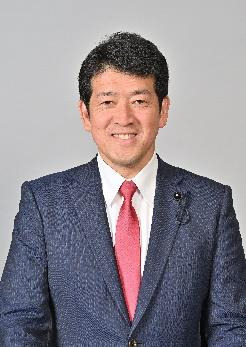
Nominee	Seiji Osaka	Kazuo Maeda
Party	CDP	LDP
Popular vote	125,771	101,243
Percentage	55.40%	44.60%
Japanese Representative before election
Seiji Osaka
Independent
Elected Japanese Representative
Seiji Osaka
CDP

Incumbent				Elected Member	
Member	Party	First elected	Status	Member	Party
Seiji Osaka	CDP	2005	Incumbent reelected.	Seiji Osaka	CDP

== Hokkaido 9th district ==
2021 Hokkaido 9th district election
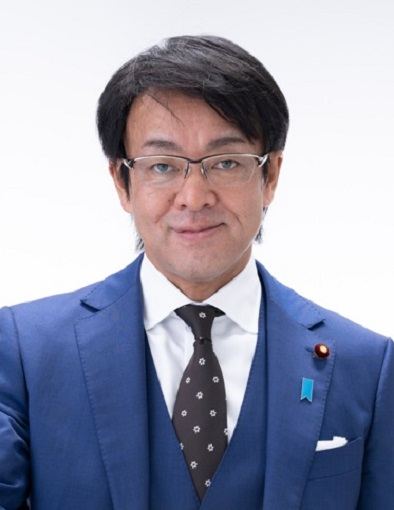

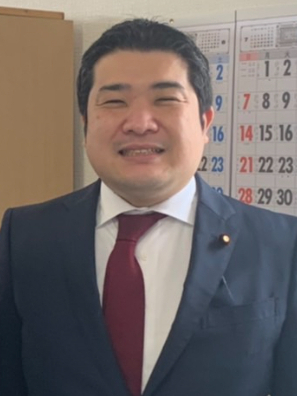
Nominee	Manabu Horii	Tatsumaru Yamaoka	Chiharu Matsuhashi
Party	LDP	Kibō no Tō	JCP
Popular vote	108,747	88,320	35,543
Percentage	46.75%	37.97%	14.09%
Japanese Representative before election
Manabu Horii
LDP
Elected Japanese Representative
Manabu Horii
LDP

Incumbent				Elected Member	
Member	Party	First elected	Status	Member	Party
Manabu Horii	LDP	2012	Incumbent reelected.	Manabu Horii	LDP

== Hokkaido 10th district ==
2021 Hokkaido 10th district election
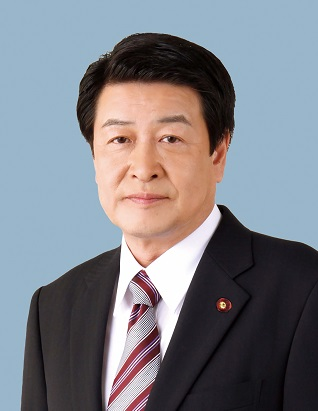

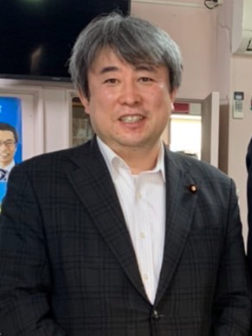
Nominee	Hisashi Inatsu	Hiroshi Kamiya
Party	Komeito	CDP
Popular vote	96,795	96,282
Percentage	50.13%	49.87%
Japanese Representative before election
Hisashi Inatsu
Komeito
Elected Japanese Representative
Hisashi Inatsu
Komeito

Incumbent				Elected Member	
Member	Party	First elected	Status	Member	Party
Hisashi Inatsu	Komeito	2012	Incumbent reelected.	Hisashi Inatsu	Komeito

== Hokkaido 11th district ==
2021 Hokkaido 11th district election
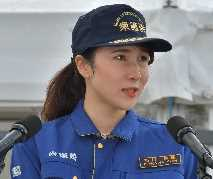

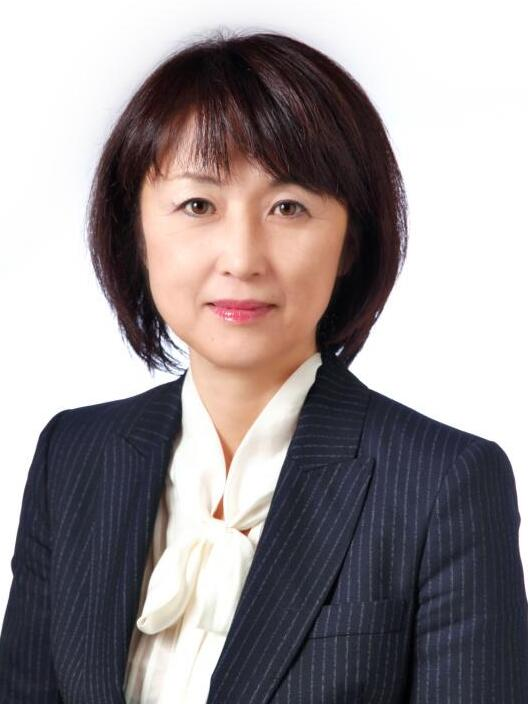
Nominee	Kaori Ishikawa	Yūko Nakagawa
Party	CDP	LDP
Popular vote	98,214	82,096
Percentage	54.47%	45.53%
Japanese Representative before election
Yūko Nakagawa
LDP
Elected Japanese Representative
Kaori Ishikawa
CDP

Incumbent				Elected Member	
Member	Party	First elected	Status	Member	Party
Yūko Nakagawa	LDP	2012	Incumbent defeated.	Kaori Ishikawa	CDP

== Hokkaido 12th district ==
2021 Hokkaido 12th district election
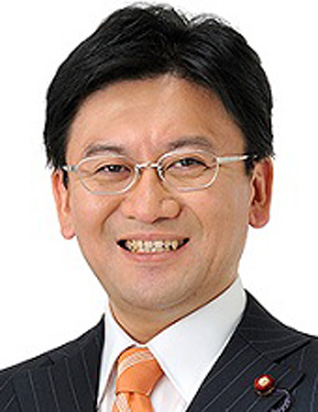
Nominee	Arata Takebe	Mika Mizukami	Makoto Sugawara
Party	LDP	Kibō no Tō	JCP
Popular vote	97,113	58,422	23,830
Percentage	54.14%	32.57%	13.29%
Japanese Representative before election
Arata Takebe
LDP
Elected Japanese Representative
Arata Takebe
LDP

Incumbent				Elected Member	
Member	Party	First elected	Status	Member	Party
Arata Takebe	LDP	2012	Incumbent reelected.	Arata Takebe	LDP

== Proportional representation block ==
Proportional Representation block results
Party	Votes	Percentage	Seats
LDP	779,903	28.8%	3
CDP	714,032	26.4%	3
Kibō	331,463	12.2%	1
Komeito	298,573	11.0%	1
Communist	230,316	8.5%	0
New Party Daichi	226,552	8.4%	0
Ishin	74,701	2.8%	0
SDP	37,374	1.4%	0
HRP	13,983	0.5%	0

Party	Elected Member	District
LDP	Takako Suzuki	ー
LDP	Koichi Watanabe	ー
LDP	Toshimitsu Funahashi	Hokkaido 1st
CDP	Hiroshi Kamiya	Hokkaido 10th
CDP	Maki Ikeda	Hokkaido 5th
CDP	Hiranao Honda	Hokkaido 4th
Kibō	Tatsumaru Yamaoka	Hokkaido 9th
Komeito	Hidemichi Sato	ー
