= 2021 Japanese general election in Hokkaido =

Hokkaido October 31, 2021 general election results

- October 31, 2021

All 20 seats to the House of Representatives
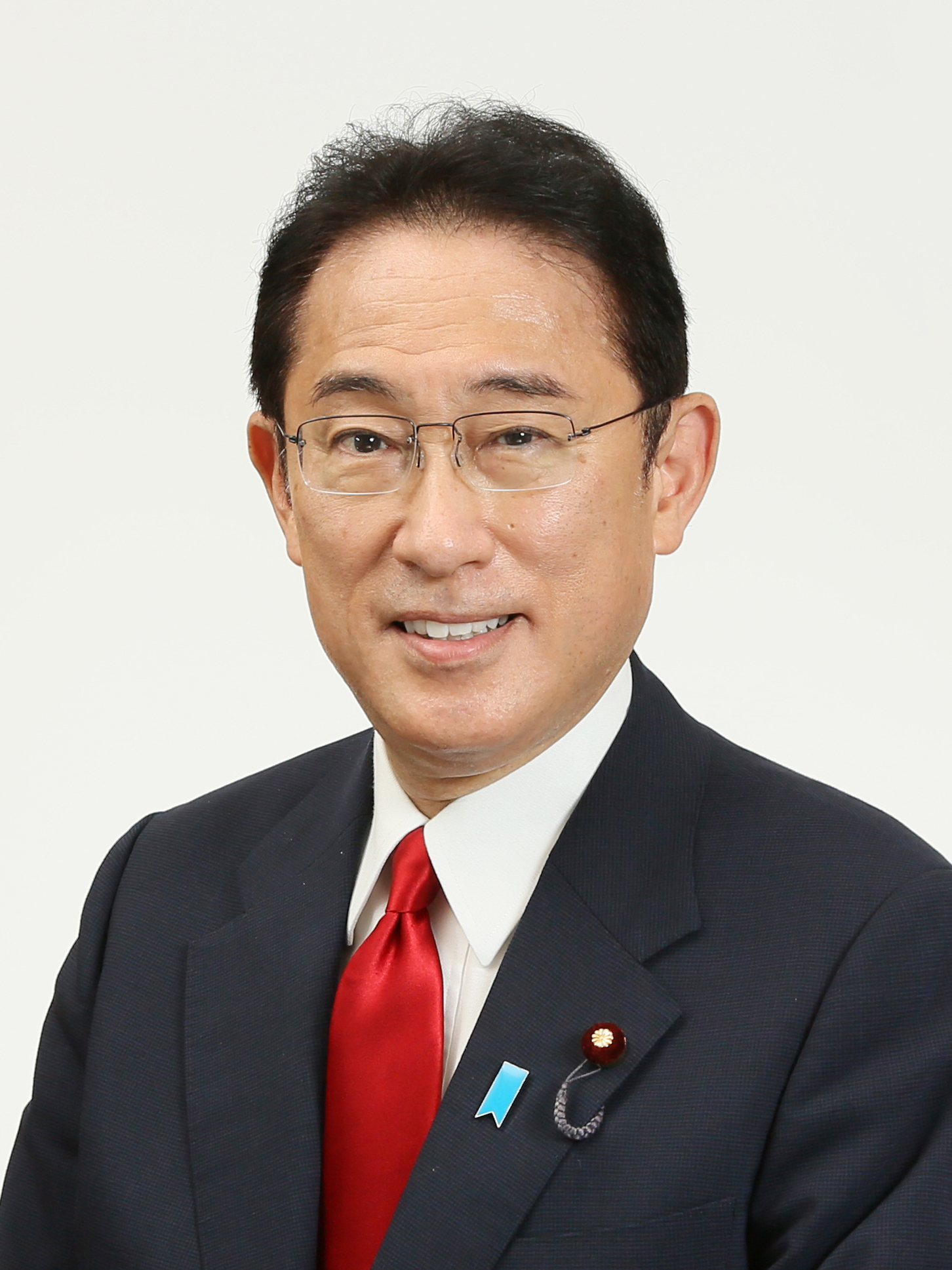

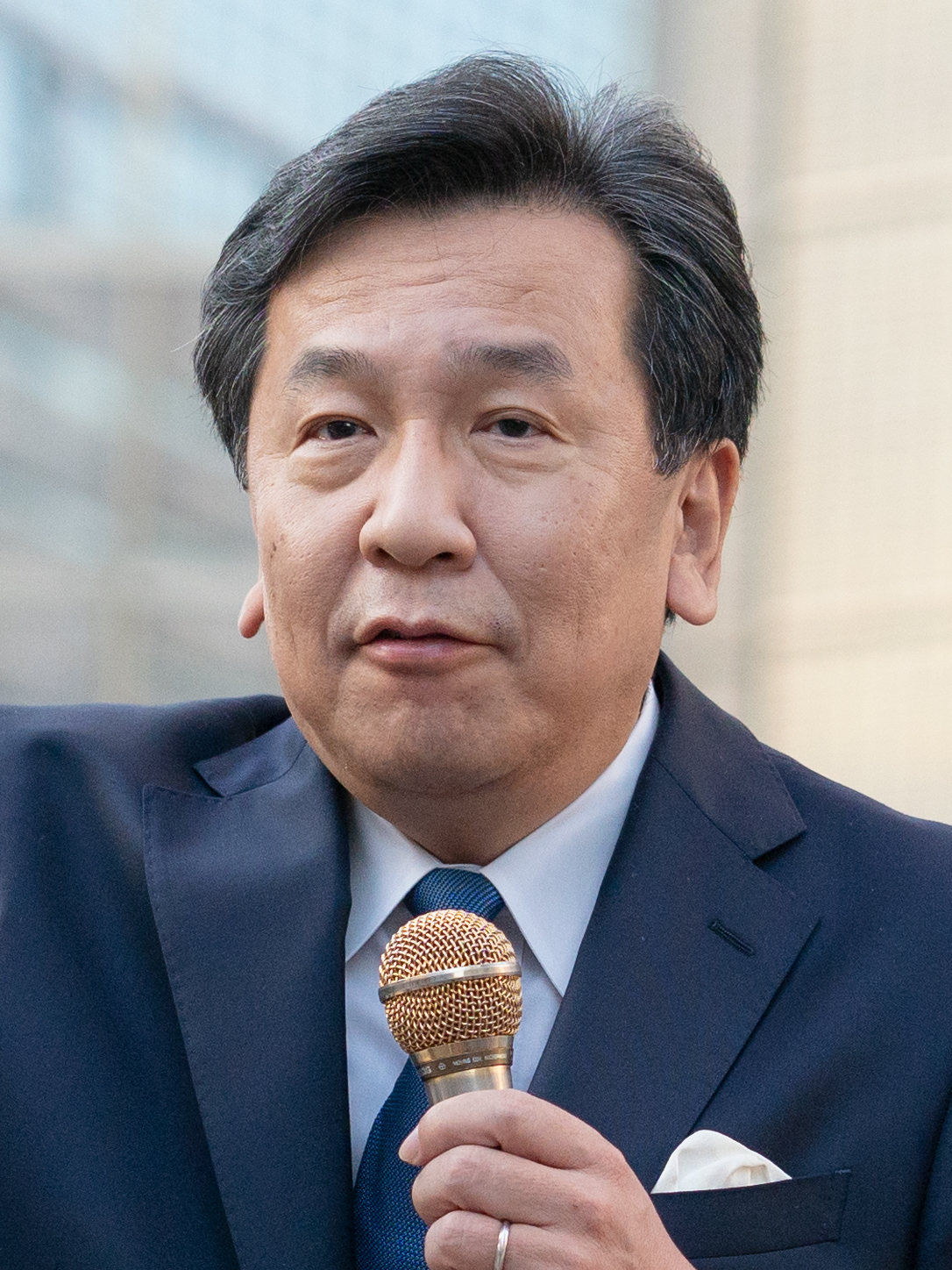

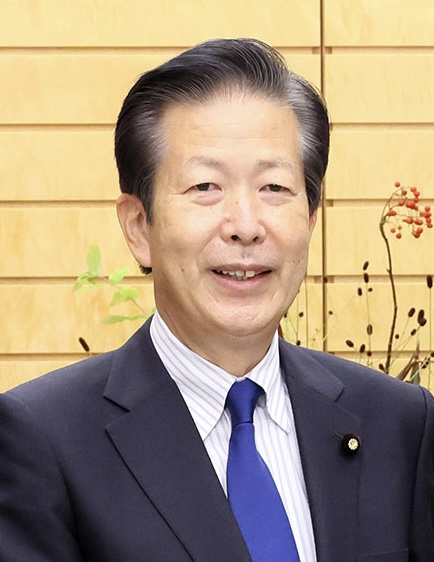
	Majority party	Minority party	Third party
Party	LDP	CDP	Komeito
Last election	9 seats	-	2 seats
Constituency	6	5	1
Constituency votes	1,163,581	1,148,293	96,843
PR seats	4	3	1
Popular votes	863,300	682,912	294,371
Total	10	8	2
Seat change	▲1	New	Steady

The 2021 Japanese general election in Hokkaido were held on October 31, 2021, to elect the 20 representatives, one from each of 12 Electoral districts and 8 proportional seats.

== Results summary ==
Constituency	2017 result	2021 winning party				Votes							
Constituency	2017 result	Party	Votes	Share	Majority	LDP	NKP	CDP	Ishin	JCP	Indep.	Others (Note: Includes all other parties)	Total
District 1	CDP	CDP	118,286	45.33%	11,301	106,985		118,286	35,652				
District 2	LDP	CDP	102,564	44.71%	12,819	89,745		102,564	41,076				
District 3	CDP	LDP	116,917	44.66%	4,382	116,917		112,535	32,340				
District 4	LDP	LDP	109,326	50.16%	696	109,326		108,630					
District 5	LDP	LDP	139,950	50.60%	28,584	139,950		111,366		16,758	8,520		
District 6	CDP	LDP	128,670	55.50%	35,267	128,670		93,403				9,776	
District 7	LDP	LDP	80,797	58.01%	35,234	80,797		45,563		12,913			
District 8	CDP	CDP	112,857	52.68%	11,478	101,379		112,857					
District 9	LDP	CDP	113,512	51.51%	6,670	106,842		113,512					
District 10	Komeito	Komeito	96,843	53.93%	14,125		96,843	82,718					
District 11	CDP	CDP	91,538	51.75%	6,202	85,336		91,538					
District 12	LDP	LDP	97,634	58.43%	42,313	97,634		55,321		14,140			

== Hokkaido 1st district ==
2021 Hokkaido 1st district election
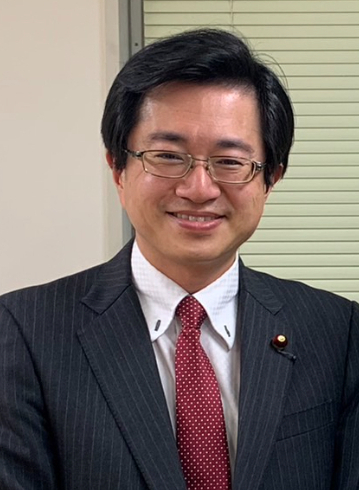

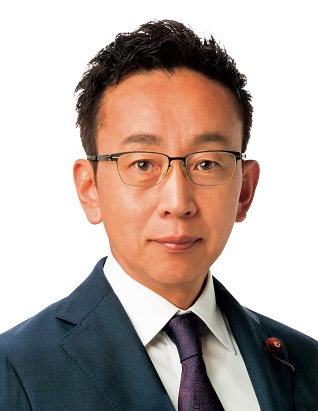
Nominee	Daiki Michishita	Toshimitsu Funahashi	Satoru Kobayashi
Party	CDP	LDP	Ishin
Popular vote	118,286	106,985	35,652
Percentage	45.33%	41.00%	13.66%
Japanese Representative before election
Daiki Michishita
CDP
Elected Japanese Representative
Daiki Michishita
CDP

Incumbent				Elected Member	
Member	Party	First elected	Status	Member	Party
Daiki Michishita	CDP	2017	Incumbent reelected.	Daiki Michishita	CDP

Candidates

- Daiki Michishita（CDP）
  - Member of the House of Representatives for Hokkaido 1st district(2017-present).
  - He is endorsed by the Social Democratic Party.
- Toshimitsu Funahashi（Liberal Democratic）
  - Member of the House of Representatives for Hokkaido proportional representation block (2017-).

Result

2021 Japanese general election
Party	Candidate	Votes	%
CDP	Daiki Michishita	118,286	45.33
LDP	Toshimitsu Funahashi	106,985	41.00
Ishin	Satoru Kobayashi	35,652	13.66
CDP hold			

Michishita, the incumbent of the Constitutional Democratic Party, was re-elected. The LDP's Funahashi was defeated again and failed to win a seat in the Hokkaido proportional representation block.

== Hokkaido 2nd district ==
2021 Hokkaido 2nd district election
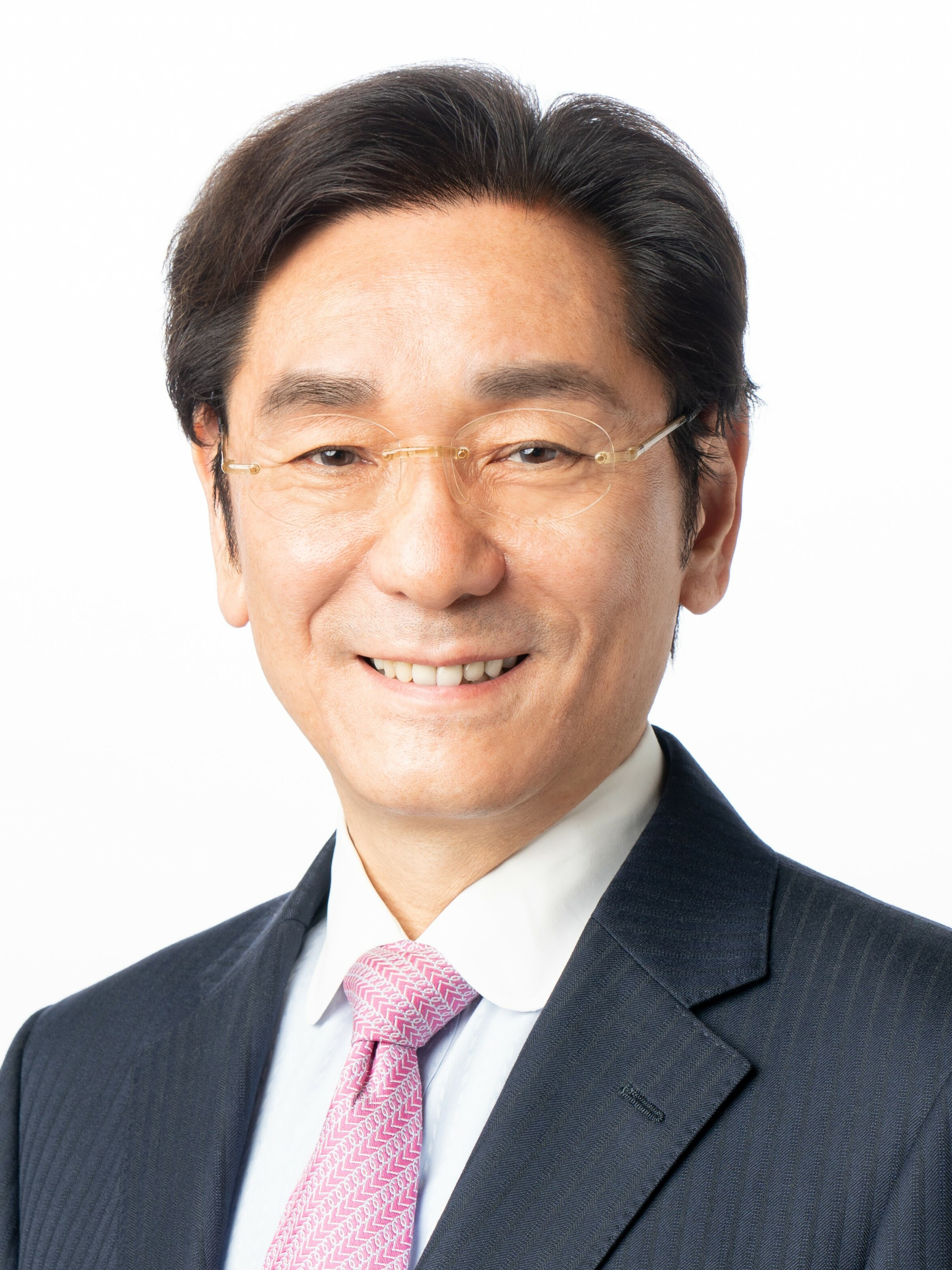
Nominee	Kenko Matsuki	Yūsuke Takahashi	Izumi Yamazaki
Party	CDP	LDP	Ishin
Popular vote	105,807	89,745	41,076
Percentage	44.71%	37.93%	17.36%
Japanese Representative before election
Kenko Matsuki
CDP
Elected Japanese Representative
Kenko Matsuki
CDP

Incumbent				Elected Member	
Member	Party	First elected	Status	Member	Party
Kenko Matsuki	CDP	2003	Incumbent reelected.	Kenko Matsuki	CDP

== Hokkaido 3rd district ==
2021 Hokkaido 3rd district election
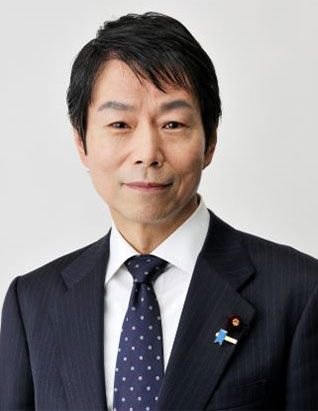
Nominee	Hirohisa Takagi	Yutaka Arai	Yasufumi Owada
Party	LDP	CDP	Ishin
Popular vote	116,917	112,535	32,340
Percentage	44.66%	42.99%	12.35%
Japanese Representative before election
Satoshi Arai
CDP
Elected Japanese Representative
Hirohisa Takagi
LDP

Incumbent				Elected Member	
Member	Party	First elected	Status	Member	Party
Satoshi Arai	CDP	1993	Incumbent retired LDP pick up.	Hirohisa Takagi	LDP

== Hokkaido 4th district ==
2021 Hokkaido 4th district election
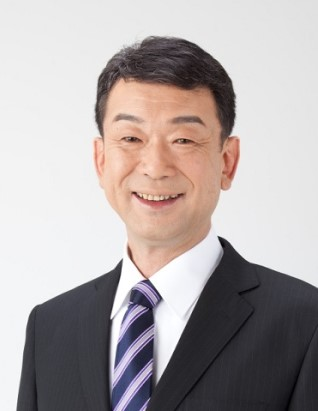
Nominee	Hiroyuki Nakamura	Kureha Ōtsuki
Party	LDP	CDP
Popular vote	109,326	108,630
Percentage	50.16%	49.84%
Japanese Representative before election
Hiroyuki Nakamura
LDP
Elected Japanese Representative
Hiroyuki Nakamura
LDP

Incumbent				Elected Member	
Member	Party	First elected	Status	Member	Party
Hiroyuki Nakamura	LDP	2012	Incumbent reelected.	Hiroyuki Nakamura	LDP

== Hokkaido 5th district ==
2021 Hokkaido 5th district election
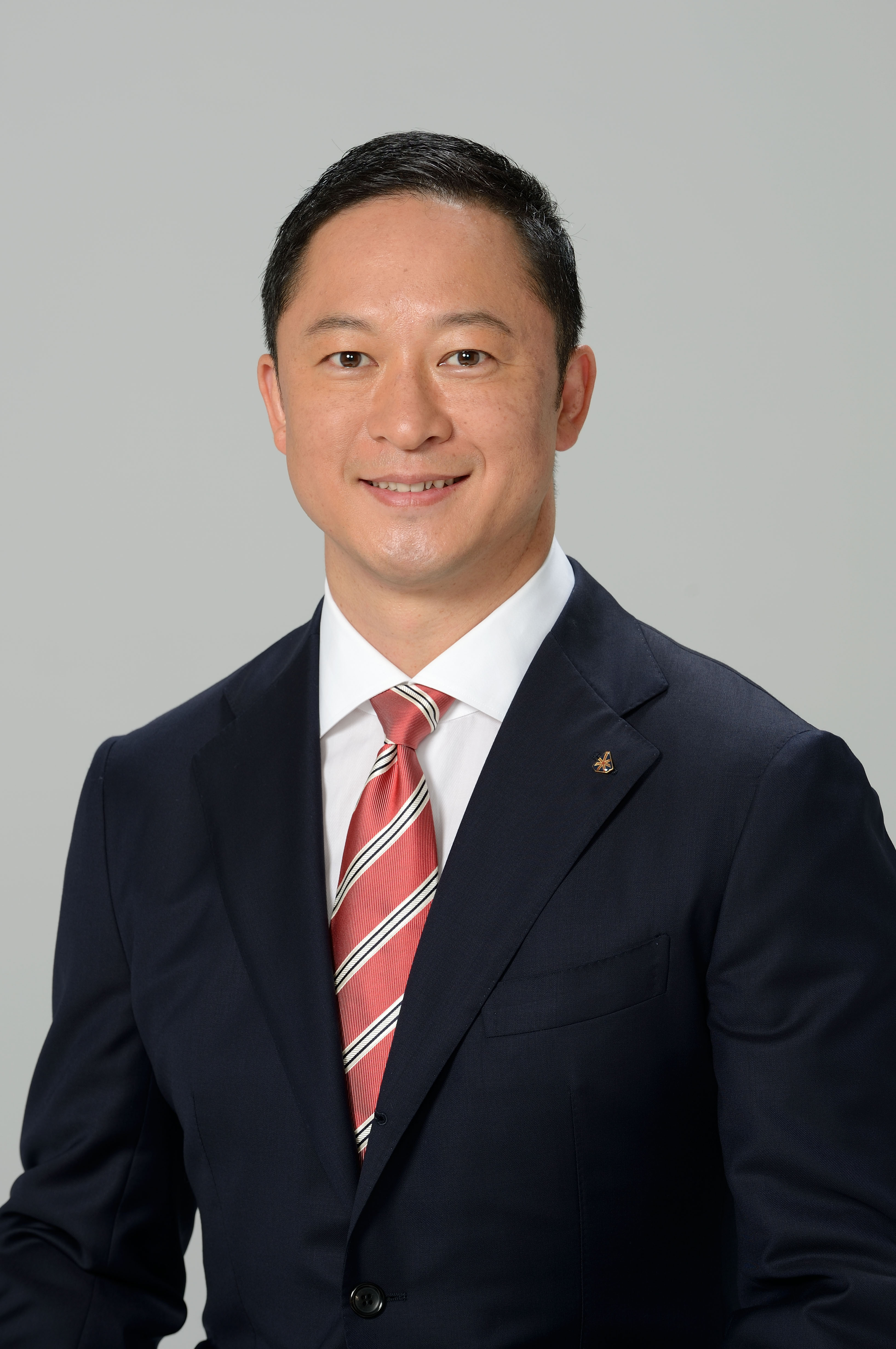

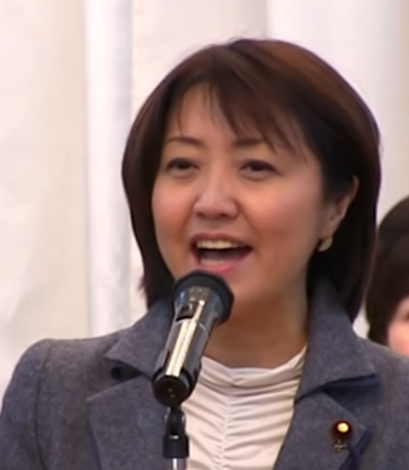
Nominee	Yoshiaki Wada	Maki Ikeda
Party	LDP	CDP
Popular vote	139,950	111,366
Percentage	50.60%	40.26%
Japanese Representative before election
Yoshiaki Wada
LDP
Elected Japanese Representative
Yoshiaki Wada
LDP

Incumbent				Elected Member	
Member	Party	First elected	Status	Member	Party
Yoshiaki Wada	LDP	2016 (by-el)	Incumbent reelected.	Yoshiaki Wada	LDP

== Hokkaido 6th district ==
2021 Hokkaido 6th district election
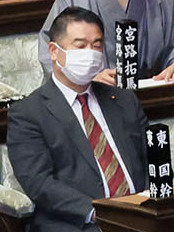
Nominee	Kuniyoshi Azuma	Masato Saikawa
Party	LDP	CDP
Popular vote	128,670	93,403
Percentage	55.50%	40.29%
Japanese Representative before election
Takahiro Sasaki
CDP
Elected Japanese Representative
Kuniyoshi Azuma
LDP

Incumbent				Elected Member	
Member	Party	First elected	Status	Member	Party
Takahiro Sasaki	CDP	2005	Incumbent retired LDP pick up.	Kuniyoshi Azuma	LDP

== Hokkaido 7th district ==
2021 Hokkaido 7th district election
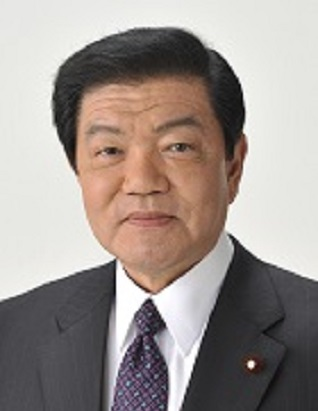
Nominee	Yoshitaka Itō	Naoko Shinoda
Party	LDP	CDP
Popular vote	80,797	45,563
Percentage	58.01%	32.71%
Japanese Representative before election
Yoshitaka Itō
LDP
Elected Japanese Representative
Yoshitaka Itō
LDP

Incumbent				Elected Member	
Member	Party	First elected	Status	Member	Party
Yoshitaka Itō	LDP	2009	Incumbent reelected.	Yoshitaka Itō	LDP

== Hokkaido 8th district ==
2021 Hokkaido 8th district election
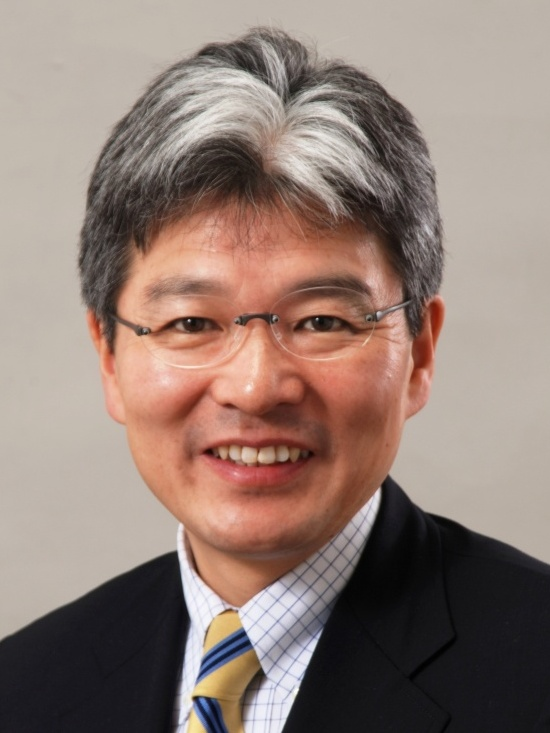

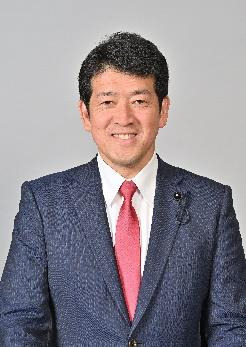
Nominee	Seiji Osaka	Kazuo Maeda
Party	CDP	LDP
Popular vote	112,857	101,379
Percentage	52.68%	47.32%
Japanese Representative before election
Seiji Osaka
CDP
Elected Japanese Representative
Seiji Osaka
CDP

Incumbent				Elected Member	
Member	Party	First elected	Status	Member	Party
Seiji Osaka	CDP	2005	Incumbent reelected.	Seiji Osaka	CDP

== Hokkaido 9th district ==
2021 Hokkaido 9th district election
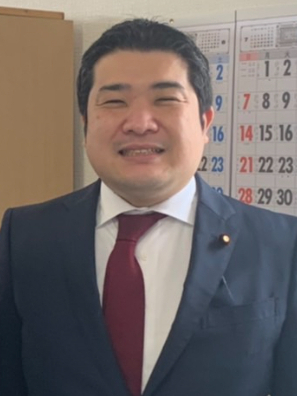

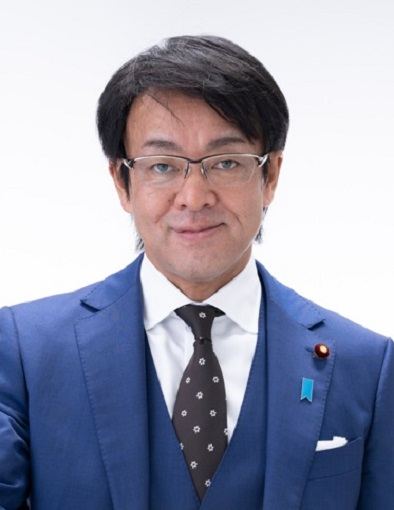
Nominee	Tatsumaru Yamaoka	Manabu Horii
Party	CDP	LDP
Popular vote	113,512	106,842
Percentage	51.51%	48.49%
Japanese Representative before election
Manabu Horii
LDP
Elected Japanese Representative
Tatsumaru Yamaoka
CDP

Incumbent				Elected Member	
Member	Party	First elected	Status	Member	Party
Manabu Horii	LDP	2012	Incumbent defeated. (Won PR seat.)	Tatsumaru Yamaoka	CDP

== Hokkaido 10th district ==
2021 Hokkaido 10th district election
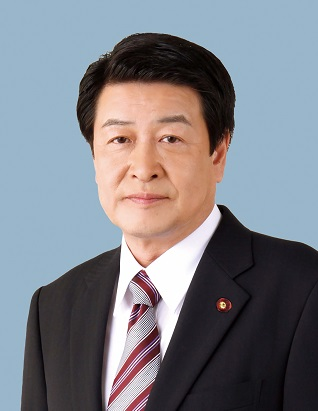

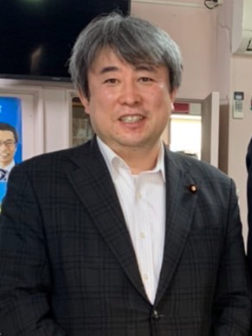
Nominee	Hisashi Inatsu	Hiroshi Kamiya
Party	Komeito	CDP
Popular vote	96,843	82,718
Percentage	53.93%	46.07%
Japanese Representative before election
Hisashi Inatsu
Komeito
Elected Japanese Representative
Hisashi Inatsu
Komeito

Incumbent				Elected Member	
Member	Party	First elected	Status	Member	Party
Hisashi Inatsu	Komeito	2012	Incumbent reelected.	Hisashi Inatsu	Komeito

== Hokkaido 11th district ==
2021 Hokkaido 11th district election
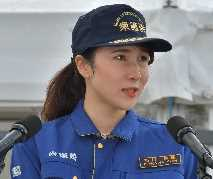

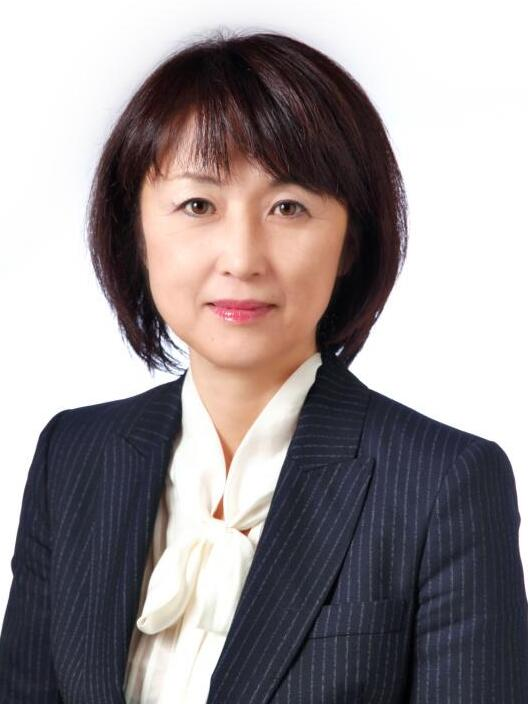
Nominee	Kaori Ishikawa	Yūko Nakagawa
Party	CDP	LDP
Popular vote	91,538	85,336
Percentage	51.75%	48.25%
Japanese Representative before election
Kaori Ishikawa
CDP
Elected Japanese Representative
Kaori Ishikawa
CDP

Incumbent				Elected Member	
Member	Party	First elected	Status	Member	Party
Kaori Ishikawa	CDP	2017	Incumbent reelected.	Kaori Ishikawa	CDP

== Hokkaido 12th district ==
2021 Hokkaido 12th district election
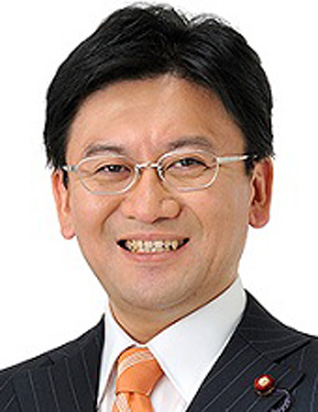
Nominee	Arata Takebe	Eisei Kawaharada
Party	LDP	CDP
Popular vote	97,634	55,321
Percentage	58.43%	33.11%
Japanese Representative before election
Arata Takebe
LDP
Elected Japanese Representative
Arata Takebe
LDP

Incumbent				Elected Member	
Member	Party	First elected	Status	Member	Party
Arata Takebe	LDP	2012	Incumbent reelected.	Arata Takebe	LDP

== Proportional representation block ==
Proportional Representation block results
Party	Votes	Percentage	Seats
LDP	863,300	33.6%	4
CDP	682,912	26.6%	3
Komeito	294,371	11.5%	1
Ishin	215,344	8.4%	0
Communist	207,189	8.1%	0
Reiwa	102,086	4.0%	0
DPP	73,621	2.9%	0
Shiji Seitō Nashi	46,142	1.8%	0
Anti-NHK	42,916	1.7%	0
SDP	41,248	1.6%	0

Party	Elected Member	District
LDP	Takako Suzuki	ー
LDP	Koichi Watanabe	ー
LDP	Manabu Horii	Hokkaido 9th
LDP	Yūko Nakagawa	Hokkaido 11th
CDP	Kureha Ōtsuki	Hokkaido 4th
CDP	Yutaka Arai	Hokkaido 3rd
CDP	Hiroshi Kamiya	Hokkaido 10th
Komeito	Hidemichi Sato	ー
