= List of members of the House of Representatives of Japan, 2014–2017 =

The members of the House of Representatives of Japan from 2014 to 2017 were elected on 14 December 2014

== Members of House of Representatives elected from single-seat constituency ==
LDP Komei DPJ JIP JCP SDP PLP PFG Independent

Hokkaido	1st	Takahiro Yokomichi	2nd	Takamori Yoshikawa	3rd	Hirohisa Takagi	4th	Hiroyuki Nakamura	5th	Nobutaka Machimura
Hokkaido	6th	Takahiro Sasaki	7th	Yoshitaka Itō	8th	Seiji Osaka	9th	Manabu Horii	10th	Hisashi Inatsu
Hokkaido	11th	Yūko Nakagawa	12th	Arata Takebe						
Aomori	1st	Jun Tsushima	2nd	Akinori Eto	3rd	Tadamori Ōshima	4th	Tarō Kimura		
Iwate	1st	Takeshi Shina	2nd	Shunichi Suzuki	3rd	Toru Kikawada	4th	Ichirō Ozawa		
Miyagi	1st	Tōru Doi	2nd	Kenya Akiba	3rd	Akihiro Nishimura	4th	Shintaro Ito	5th	Jun Azumi
Miyagi	6th	Itsunori Onodera								
Akita	1st	Hiroyuki Togashi	2nd	Katsutoshi Kaneda	3rd	Nobuhide Minorikawa				
Yamagata	1st	Toshiaki Endo	2nd	Norikazu Suzuki	3rd	Ayuko Kato				
Fukushima	1st	Yoshitami Kameoka	2nd	Takumi Nemoto	3rd	Kōichirō Genba	4th	Shinji Oguma	5th	Masayoshi Yoshino
Ibaraki	1st	Yoshinori Tadokoro	2nd	Fukushiro Nukaga	3rd	Yasuhiro Hanashi	4th	Hiroshi Kajiyama	5th	Akihiro Ohata
Ibaraki	6th	Yuya Niwa	7th	Kishirō Nakamura						
Tochigi	1st	Hajime Funada	2nd	Akio Fukuda	3rd	Kazuo Yana	4th	Tsutomu Sato	5th	Toshimitsu Motegi
Gunma	1st	Genichiro Sata	2nd	Toshirō Ino	3rd	Hiroyoshi Sasagawa	4th	Tatsuo Fukuda	5th	Yūko Obuchi
Saitama	1st	Hideki Murai	2nd	Yoshitaka Shindō	3rd	Hitoshi Kikawada	4th	Mayuko Toyota	5th	Yukio Edano
Saitama	6th	Atsushi Oshima	7th	Saichi Kamiyama	8th	Masahiko Shibayama	9th	Taku Otsuka	10th	Taimei Yamaguchi
Saitama	11th	Ryuji Koizumi	12th	Atsushi Nonaka	13th	Shinako Tsuchiya	14th	Hiromi Mitsubayashi	15th	Ryosei Tanaka
Chiba	1st	Kaname Tajima	2nd	Takayuki Kobayashi	3rd	Hirokazu Matsuno	4th	Yoshihiko Noda	5th	Kentaro Sonoura
Chiba	6th	Hiromichi Watanabe	7th	Ken Saitō	8th	Yoshitaka Sakurada	9th	Masatoshi Akimoto	10th	Motoo Hayashi
Chiba	11th	Eisuke Mori	12th	Yasukazu Hamada	13th	Takaki Shirasuka				
Kanagawa	1st	Jun Matsumoto	2nd	Yoshihide Suga	3rd	Hachiro Okonogi	4th	Keiichiro Asao	5th	Manabu Sakai
Kanagawa	6th	Isamu Ueda	7th	Keisuke Suzuki	8th	Kenji Eda	9th	Hirofumi Ryu	10th	Kazunori Tanaka
Kanagawa	11th	Shinjiro Koizumi	12th	Tsuyoshi Hoshino	13th	Akira Amari	14th	Jiro Akama	15th	Taro Kono
Kanagawa	16th	Yūichi Goto	17th	Karen Makishima	18th	Daishiro Yamagiwa				
Yamanashi	1st	Katsuhito Nakajima	2nd	Kotaro Nagasaki						
Tokyo	1st	Miki Yamada	2nd	Kiyoto Tsuji	3rd	Hirotaka Ishihara	4th	Masaaki Taira	5th	Kenji Wakamiya
Tokyo	6th	Takao Ochi	7th	Akira Nagatsuma	8th	Nobuteru Ishihara	9th	Isshu Sugawara	10th	Yuriko Koike
Tokyo	11th	Hakubun Shimomura	12th	Akihiro Ōta	13th	Ichiro Kamoshita	14th	Midori Matsushima	15th	Mito Kakizawa
Tokyo	16th	Hideo Ōnishi	17th	Katsuei Hirasawa	18th	Masatada Tsuchiya	19th	Yohei Matsumoto	20th	Seiji Kihara
Tokyo	21st	Kiyoshi Odawara	22nd	Tatsuya Ito	23rd	Masanobu Ogura	24th	Kōichi Hagiuda	25th	Shinji Inoue
Niigata	1st	Toru Ishizaki	2nd	Kenichi Hosoda	3rd	Takahiro Kuroiwa	4th	Megumi Kaneko	5th	Tadayoshi Nagashima
Niigata	6th	Shuichi Takatori								
Toyama	1st	Hiroaki Tabata	2nd	Mitsuhiro Miyakoshi	3rd	Keiichiro Tachibana				
Ishikawa	1st	Hiroshi Hase	2nd	Hajime Sasaki	3rd	Shigeo Kitamura				
Fukui	1st	Tomomi Inada	2nd	Tsuyoshi Takagi						
Nagano	1st	Takashi Shinohara	2nd	Shunsuke Mutai	3rd	Yōsei Ide	1st	Shigeyuki Goto	5th	Ichiro Miyashita
Gifu	1st	Seiko Noda	2nd	Yasufumi Tanahashi	3rd	Yoji Muto	4th	Kazuyoshi Kaneko	5th	Keiji Furuya
Shizuoka	1st	Yōko Kamikawa	2nd	Tatsunori Ibayashi	3rd	Hiroyuki Miyazawa	4th	Yoshio Mochizuki	5th	Goshi Hosono
Shizuoka	6th	Shu Watanabe	7th	Minoru Kiuchi	8th	Ryu Shionoya				
Aichi	1st	Hiromichi Kumada	2nd	Motohisa Furukawa	3rd	Shoichi Kondo	4th	Shōzō Kudo	5th	Hirotaka Akamatsu
Aichi	6th	Hideki Niwa	7th	Shiori Yamao	8th	Tadahiko Ito	9th	Yasumasa Nagasaka	10th	Tetsuma Esaki
Aichi	11th	Shinichiro Furumoto	12th	Kazuhiko Shigetoku	13th	Kensuke Ōnishi	14th	Sōichirō Imaeda	1st	Yukinori Nemoto
Mie	1st	Jiro Kawasaki	2nd	Masaharu Nakagawa	3rd	Katsuya Okada	4th	Norihisa Tamura	5th	Norio Mitsuya
Shiga	1st	Fujitaka Ōoka	2nd	Kenichiro Ueno	3rd	Nobuhide Takemura	4th	Takaya Muto		
Kyoto	1st	Bunmei Ibuki	2nd	Seiji Maehara	3rd	Kensuke Miyazaki	4th	Hideyuki Tanaka	5th	Sadakazu Tanigaki
Kyoto	6th	Kazunori Yamanoi								
Osaka	1st	Hidetaka Inoue	2nd	Akira Satō	3rd	Shigeki Sato	4th	Yasuhide Nakayama	5th	Tōru Kunishige
Osaka	6th	Shinichi Isa	7th	Naomi Tokashiki	8th	Takashi Ōtsuka	9th	Kenji Harada	10th	Kiyomi Tsujimoto
Osaka	11th	Yukari Sato	12th	Tomokatsu Kitagawa	13th	Kōichi Munekiyo	14th	Takashi Tanihata	15th	Naokazu Takemoto
Osaka	16th	Kazuo Kitagawa	17th	Nobuyuki Baba	18th	Takashi Endo	19th	Hodaka Maruyama		
Hyōgo	1st	Nobuhiko Isaka	2nd	Kazuyoshi Akaba	3rd	Yoshihiro Seki	4th	Hisayuki Fujii	5th	Koichi Tani
Hyōgo	6th	Masaki Ōgushi	7th	Kenji Yamada	8th	Hiromasa Nakano	9th	Yasutoshi Nishimura	10th	Kisabro Tokai
Hyōgo	11th	Takeaki Matsumoto	12th	Tsuyoshi Yamaguchi						
Nara	1st	Sumio Mabuchi	2nd	Sanae Takaichi	3rd	Shinsuke Okuno	4th	Taido Tanose		
Wakayama	1st	Shuhei Kishimoto	2nd	Masatoshi Ishida	3rd	Toshihiro Nikai				
Tottri	1st	Shigeru Ishiba	2nd	Ryosei Akazawa						
Shimane	1st	Hiroyuki Hosoda	2nd	Wataru Takeshita						
Okayama	1st	Ichiro Aizawa	2nd	Takashi Yamashita	3rd	Takeo Hiranuma	4th	Gaku Hashimoto	5th	Katsunobu Kato
Hiroshima	1st	Fumio Kishida	2nd	Hiroshi Hiraguchi	3rd	Katsuyuki Kawai	4th	Toshinao Nakagawa	5th	Minoru Terada
Hiroshima	6th	Shizuka Kamei	7th	Fumiaki Kobayashi						
Yamaguchi	1st	Masahiko Kōmura	2nd	Nobuo Kishi	3rd	Takeo Kawamura	4th	Shinzo Abe		
Tokushima	1st	Masazumi Gotoda	2nd	Shunichi Yamaguchi						
Kagawa	1st	Takuya Hirai	2nd	Yuichiro Tamaki	3rd	Keitaro Ohno				
Ehime	1st	Yasuhisa Shiozaki	2nd	Seiichiro Murakami	3rd	Toru Shiraishi	4th	Koichi Yamamoto		
Kōchi	1st	Gen Nakatani	2nd	Yūji Yamamoto						
Fukuoka	1st	Takahiro Inoue	2nd	Makoto Oniki	3rd	Atsushi Koga	4th	Hideki Miyauchi	5th	Yoshiaki Harada
Fukuoka	6th	Kunio Hatoyama	7th	Satoshi Fujimaru	8th	Tarō Asō	9th	Asahiko Mihara	10th	Kōzō Yamamoto
Fukuoka	11th	Ryota Takeda								
Saga	1st	Kazuhiro Haraguchi	2nd	Yasushi Furukawa						
Nagasaki	1st	Tsutomu Tomioka	2nd	Kanji Kato	3rd	Yaichi Tanigawa	4th	Seigo Kitamura		
Kumamoto	1st	Minoru Kihara	2nd	Takeshi Noda	3rd	Tetsushi Sakamoto	4th	Hiroyuki Sonoda	5th	Yasushi Kaneko
Ōita	1st	Shuji Kira	2nd	Seishiro Eto	3rd	Takeshi Iwaya				
Miyazaki	1st	Shunsuke Takei	2nd	Taku Etō	3rd	Yoshihisa Furukawa				
Kagoshima	1st	Okiharu Yasuoka	2nd	Masuo Kaneko	3rd	Takeshi Noma	4th	Yasuhiro Ozato	5th	Hiroshi Moriyama
Okinawa	1st	Seiken Akamine	2nd	Kantoku Teruya	3rd	Denny Tamaki	4th	Toshinobu Nakasato		

=== By-elections ===
Year	Month and date	District	Winner	Party	Vacancy	Party	Notes
2015	ー	There was a reason for the implementation, but it was originally scheduled to hold a by-election in Hokkaido 5th district, but it was postponed to the next election due to apportionment lawsuit. There were no national elections in 2015.					
2016	April 24	Hokkaido-5th	Yoshiaki Wada	LDP	Nobutaka Machimura	LDP	Machimura died on 1 June 2015.
2016	April 24	Kyoto-3rd	Kenta Izumi	DP	Kensuke Miyazaki	LDP	Miyazaki resigned as a member of the House of Representatives on 16 February 2016, to take responsibility for his adultery.
2016	October 23	Fukuoka-6th	Jiro Hatoyama	Independent	Kunio Hatoyama	LDP	Hatoyama died on 21 June 2016.
2016	October 23	Tokyo-10th	Masaru Wakasa	LDP	Yuriko Koike	LDP	Koike resigned as a member of the House of Representatives 14 July 2016 to run for 2016 Tokyo gubernatorial election.
2017	ー	Aomori-4th	ー	ー	Tarō Kimura	LDP	Kimura died on 25 July 2017.
2017	ー	Niigata-5th	ー	ー	Tadayoshi Nagashima	LDP	Nagashima died on 18 August 2017.
2017	ー	Ehime-3rd	ー	ー	Toru Shiraishi	LDP	Shiraishi died on 17 March 2017.

- By-election for Aomori 4th district, Niigata 5th district, and Ehime 3rd district was scheduled to be held in October 2017, but by-election was canceled because the House of Representatives was dissolved and 2017 Japanese general election was held.

== Members of House of Representatives elected from proportional representation block ==
LDP Komei DPJ JIP JCP SDP

	Hokkaido	Tohoku	Northern Kanto	Southern Kanto	Tokyo	Hokurikushinetsu	Tokai	Kinki	Chugoku	Shikoku	Kyushu
1	Koichi Watanabe	Ichiro Kanke	Koya Nishikawa	Shinichi Nakatani	Tsukasa Akimoto	Taku Yamamoto	Junji Suzuki	Takashi Nagao	Toshiko Abe	Teru Fukui	Kazuchika Iwata
2	Takako Suzuki	Emi Kaneko	Yasuko Komiyama	Tomoko Abe	Akihisa Nagashima	Eiichiro Washio	Yasuhiro Nakane	Sakihito Ozawa	Toshifumi Kojima	Junya Ogawa	Yasuyuki Eda
3	Hiroshi Imazu	Takashi Fujiwara	Hideki Makihara	Noriko Miyagawa	Fumiaki Matsumoto	Hiroaki Saito	Takaaki Katsumata	Yuzuru Takeuchi	Michiyoshi Yunoki	Mamoru Fukuyama	Yoichi Anami
4	Satoshi Arai	Sekio Masuda	Keiichi Ishii	Kazumi Ōta	Akira Kasai	Toyofumi Yoshida	Masato Imai	Hiroyuki Ōnishi	Tetsuo Saito	Noritoshi Ishida	Hiroshi Ōgushi
5	Hidemichi Sato	Yōsuke Kondō	Yūnosuke Sakamoto	Shigeyuki Tomita	Takayuki Ochiai	Yutaka Komatsu	Yoshinori Ōguchi	Yasushi Adachi	Masayoshi Shintani	Hiroyuki Yokoyama	Yorihisa Matsuno
6	Kazuya Hatayama	Yoshihisa Inoue	Tetsuya Shiokawa	Kazuo Shii	Yōsuke Takagi	Makiko Kikuta	Yutaka Banno	Keiji Kokuta	Takashi Takai	Takakazu Seto	Kosaburo Nishime
7	Kazuo Maeda	Hinako Takahashi	Kazuyuki Nakane	Hiroyuki Yoshiie	Hayato Suzuki	Yasufumi Fujino	Shuhei Aoyama	Kenta Izumi	Michitaka Ikeda		Takaaki Tamura
8	Kenko Matsuki	Chizuko Takahashi	Takeshi Miyazaki	Soichiro Okuno	Jin Matsubara	Yoshio Urushibara	Nobuko Motomura	Noboru Kamitani	Yoshinobu Ohira		Kiyohiko Toyama
9		Hidenori Hashimoto	Akimasa Ishikawa	Norihiro Nakayama	Megumi Maekawa	Hitoshi Kiuchi	Yoshitaka Ikeda	Tomohiko Kinoshita	Keisuke Tsumura		Kōnosuke Kokuba
10		Manabu Terata	Mitsunari Okamoto	Yoichiro Aoyagi	Toru Miyamoto	Chinami Nishimura	Mitsunori Okamoto	Tomoko Ukishima	Keigo Masuya		Yoshiaki Takaki
11		Shigeaki Katsunuma	Yoshihiro Suzuki	Hiroaki Kadoyama	Akihiro Hatsushika	Shigeyoshi Sukeda	Yoshio Maki	Hiroshi Ando	Keiichi Furuta		Takuma Miyaji
12		Toshihide Muraoka	Keiko Nagaoka	Noriko Furuya	Masaru Wakasa		Sei Ōmi	Hirofumi Yoshimura			Masami Kawano
13		Kazuko Kōri	Koichi Takemasa	Kimie Hatano	Michiyo Takagi		Wataru Ito	Takeshi Miyamoto			Masakazu Hamachi
14		Yūichi Mayama	Saeko Umemura	Kentaro Motomura	Naoto Kan		Nobuhiro Koyama	Tatsuo Kawabata			Natsumi Higa
15			Tomohiro Konno	Noriko Horiuchi	Tsuneo Akaeda		Kenji Kanda	Tomu Tanigawa			Rintaro Ogata
16			Asako Omi	Gō Shinohara	Saori Ikeuchi		Naohisa Matsuda	Yasuto Urano			Hajime Yoshikawa
17			Keiichi Koshimizu	Tomohiro Yamamoto	Takakane Kiuchi		Yukihiro Shimazu	Naoya Higuchi			Masahisa Miyazaki
18			Takashi Ishizeki	Yōsuke Kamiyama			Tetsuya Yagi	Shohei Okashita			Shozo Majima
19			Nobuyuki Fukushima	Hideo Tsunoda			Katsumasa Suzuki	Sayuri Uenishi			Nobuhiro Yoshida
20			Yayoi Kimura	Mineyuki Fukuda			Yoshikazu Shimada	Tadashi Shimizu			Mikio Shimoji
21				Kazuko Saito			Yasuhiro Nakagawa	Hirofumi Kado			Masahiro Imamura
22				Masashi Mito				Issei Tajima			
23								Kenta Matsunami			
24								Susumu Hamamura			
25								Kazuhide Ōkuma			
26								Nobuhisa Ito			
27								Masahito Moriyama			
28								Terufumi Horiuchi			
29								Hirofumi Hirano			

=== People who were elected in PR following the resignation of another member of the House of Representatives ===
Year	Month	block	Winner	Party	Vacancy	Notes
2015	October	Kinki	Tamotsu Shiiki	JIP	Hirofumi Yoshimura	Yoshimura resigned as a member of the House of Representatives on 1 October 2015, to run for 2015 Osaka mayoral election.
2016	April	Kinki	Keiro Kitagaki	DPJ	Kenta Izumi	Izumi lost his job as a member of the House of Representatives on 12 April 2016, to run for the by-election in Kyoto 3rd district.
2016	October	Tokyo	Tsuyoshi Tabata	LDP	Masaru Wakasa	Wakasa lost his job as a member of the House of Representatives on 11 October 2016, to run for the by-election in Tokyo 10th district.
2017	July	Tohoku	Izumi Yoshida	DPJ	Kazuko Kōri	Kōri lost her job as a member of the House of Representatives on 9 July 2017, to run for 2017 Sendai mayoral election.
