= 2016 Hokkaido 5th district by-election =

- 24 April 2016

Hokkaido 5th district
- Turnout: 57.63%
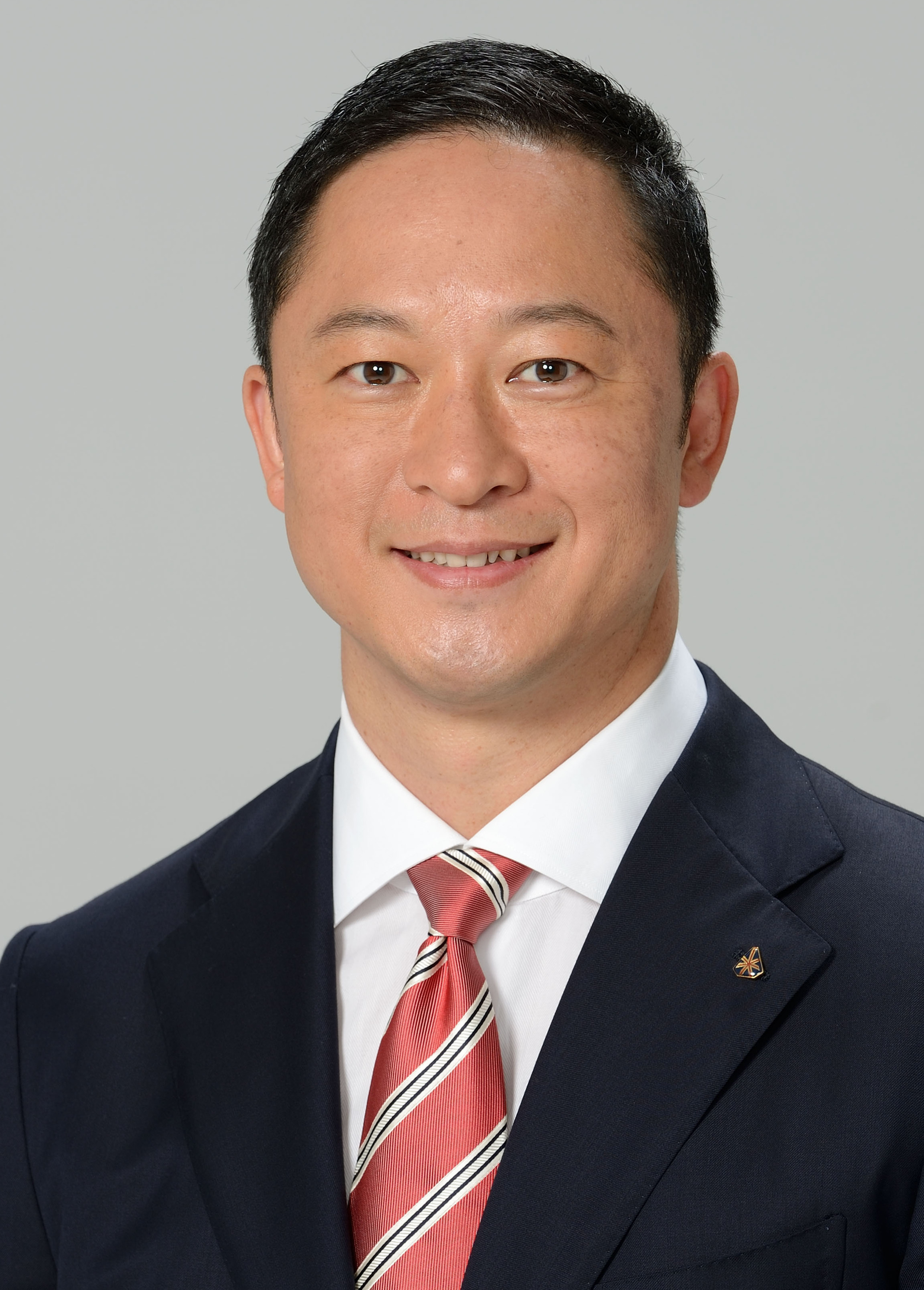

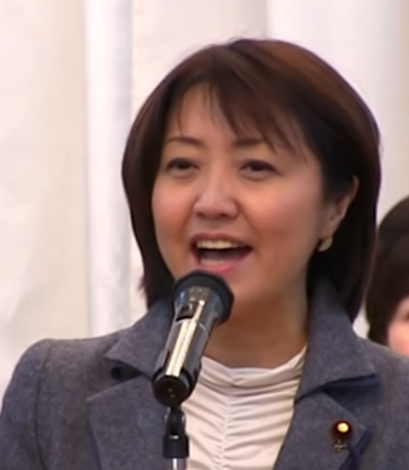
Nominee	Yoshiaki Wada	Maki Ikeda
Party	LDP	Independent
Alliance	Komeito / PJK / NPD	Democratic / JCP / SDP / PLP
Popular vote	135,842	123,517
Percentage	52.38%	47.62%
Representative before election
Nobutaka Machimura
LDP
Elected Representative
Yoshiaki Wada
LDP

A by-election for the Hokkaido-5th seat in the Japanese House of Representatives was held on 24 April 2016, coinciding with another by-election in Kyoto. The by-election was triggered by the death of the sitting member, former Speaker of the House and Foreign Minister Nobutaka Machimura from cerebral infarction in Osaka on 1 June 2015. Machimura, a member of the Liberal Democratic Party, was a long-serving representative for the district, holding the seat almost continuously between 1996 and 2015 (except for a brief period between 2009 and 2010). The seat has been considered safe for the LDP, with Machimura retaining it on a 14.1% margin in the 2014 general election.

In a result that has been considered a boost for the LDP ahead of the mid-year House of Councillors election, Machimura's son-in-law Yoshiaki Wada won the election with 52.4% of the vote, retaining the seat for the LDP.

== Date ==
In recent decades, by-elections for the National Diet have been either held either together with an upcoming general/regular election for the other house or in April or October. After Machimura's death, the by-election in the 5th district was initially planned for October 2015; but as a Supreme Court decision on the constitutionality of the 2014 House of Representatives election (see Elections in Japan#Malapportionment) was pending, the scheduling of the by-election was suspended. By September 2015, it was clear that the Supreme Court decision would not come in time to schedule the Hokkaido by-election for October, so it was postponed to April 2016 and eventually scheduled for April 24.

== Candidates ==
The ruling LDP nominated Yoshiaki Wada, a former businessman and the son-in-law of Machimura, to contest the election; it was his first time running for public office. He was opposed by one independent candidate, Maki Ikeda. Wada was endorsed by the LDP's coalition partner Komeito and two other minor conservative parties, the Party for Japanese Kokoro and New Party Daichi. Ikeda received endorsements from the main opposition party, the Democratic Party, plus the Communist Party, Social Democratic Party and People's Life Party.

== Campaign ==
The by-election was widely viewed as a litmus test for Prime Minister Shinzo Abe's controversial defense and social policies; some observers said that Abe might have dissolved the House for a double election in mid-2016 if the LDP lost the by-election. Opinion polls prior to the election showed that voters were primarily concerned with foreign policy and security issues, followed by welfare and childcare.

Wada campaigned strongly on his position as a successor to his father-in-law Machimura, whilst also providing his twenty years of experience in a trading company as evidence of his ability to improve economic conditions and promote the export of Hokkaido's agricultural produce. Wada was well-supported by the LDP and Komeito during the campaign, with many prominent members visiting the district.

=== Nomination strategy fallout ===
In February 2016, DPJ Hokkaido proportional representative Takako Suzuki (the daughter of NPD founder Muneo Suzuki) applied to leave the Democratic Party over the party's cooperation with the Communist Party in the 5th district by-election. Her father had already indicated support for Wada and was hinting at an explicit Daichi endorsement. The DPJ responded to Suzuki's request by expelling her from the party. In the succeeding vote on the budget for fiscal 2016, the younger Suzuki voted with the ruling parties.

== Results ==
Margins for Wada (blue) or Ikeda (orange) by municipality and SDF camps and bases in the district

Wada won the election by a margin of 12,325 votes (4.76%) in what was described as a full-faced battle between the ruling and opposition parties, the first such contest since the 2014 general election. The turnout was 57.6% of the 455,262 registered voters in the district, a slight decrease from the previous general election. Wada described the campaign as a tough battle, focusing on improving the local economy and becoming a "salesman" for Hokkaido in his victory speech. Ikeda was quoted as saying she faced the contest with the intention of creating a society in which all people can feel safe, and that the result was disappointing.

House of Representatives: Hokkaido 5th district by-election, 2016
Party	Candidate	Votes	%	±%
LDP	Yoshiaki Wada	135,842	52.38	▲1.43
Independent	Maki Ikeda	123,517	47.62	N/A
Rejected ballots		3,015	1.15	
Majority		12,325	4.74	▼9.39
Turnout		262,374	57.63	▼0.80
LDP hold		Swing	N/A	
