= Hokkaido 2nd district =

Japan House of Representatives constituency

Hokkaido 2nd District
- Parliamentary constituency for the Japanese House of Representatives
- Numbered map of Hokkaidō Prefecture single-member districts

- Sapporo-area detail
- Prefecture: Hokkaidō
- Proportional District: Hokkaidō
- Electorate: 460,828 (2021)

Current constituency
- Created: 1994
- Seats: One
- Party: LDP
- Representative: Yūsuke Takahashi
- Created from: Hokkaido's 1st medium sized district
- Municipalities: Sapporo's Kita Ward and Higashi Ward

Hokkaidō 2nd district (北海道[第]2区, Hokkai-dō [dai-]ni-ku) is a single-member electoral district for the House of Representatives, the lower house of the National Diet of Japan. It is located in Sapporo, the prefectural capital of Hokkaido and consists of the Higashi ("East") ward and most of the Kita ("North") ward.

The current Representative is Kenko Matsuki, member of the CDP. He won the seat in a special election in April 2021 and was reelected in the general election later that year. Matsuki was formerly a representative of the Hokkaido 12th district.

The Representative from the district from 2012 to 2020 was Liberal Democrat Takamori Yoshikawa. In 2020 he resigned due to accusations of accepting bribes during his time as Agriculture Minister. Yoshikawa had lost the previous three elections to Democrat Wakio Mitsui. Yoshikawa had been the LDP candidate in the 2nd district since the initial election of 1996, but only won the district in 2000 (he won a Hokkaidō proportional seat on the LDP list in 1996 and 2005). Mitsui had contested the 3rd district for the NFP in 1996, but ranked third behind candidates from LDP and DPJ; in 2000, he ran only as a candidate on the DPJ proportional list and won a seat, before taking over the DPJ candidacy in the 2nd district in 2003.

Before the introduction of the current first-past-the-post/proportional representation parallel electoral system for the House of Representatives in the 1990s, Sapporo city had been part of the SNTV six-member 1st district.

== List of representatives ==
Representative	Party	Dates	Notes
Jun'ichi Osanai	NFP	1996–1998	Had represented the pre-reform 1st district for Kōmeitō→NFP since 1993
Jun'ichi Osanai	Kōmeitō	1998-2000	Joined the New Peace Party (Heiwa Shintō) for a short period before it merged into Kōmeitō in 1998
Takamori Yoshikawa	LDP	2000–2003	Failed to win a proportional seat in the Hokkaidō block in 2003
Wakio Mitsui	DPJ	2003–2012	Failed to win a proportional seat in the Hokkaidō block in 2012
Takamori Yoshikawa	LDP	2012–2020	Resigned
Vacant (December 2020 – April 2021)
Kenko Matsuki	CDP	2021–2026	Failed to win a proportional seat in the Hokkaidō block in 2026
Yusuke Takahashi	LDP	2026-	

== Recent results ==
2026
Party	Candidate	Votes	%	±%
LDP	Yūsuke Takahashi	102,343	42.9	▲10.2
Centrist Reform	Kenkō Matsuki	72,670	30.4	▼9.6
Sanseitō	Ayako Nakata	27,591	11.6	
Ishin	Izumi Yamazaki	18,625	7.8	▼5.9
JCP	Daisuke Hiraoka	17,515	7.3	▼6.3
Turnout		459,581	52.99	▲0.38
LDP gain from Centrist Reform				

2024
Party	Candidate	Votes	%	±%
CDP	Kenkō Matsuki	94,002	40.0	▼4.7
LDP	Yūsuke Takahashi	76,835	32.7	▼5.2
Ishin	Izumi Yamazaki	32,073	13.7	▼3.7
JCP	Shiori Miyauchi	31,855	13.6	
Turnout			52.61	▼3.38
CDP hold				

2021
Party	Candidate	Votes	%	±%
CDP	Kenkō Matsuki	105,807	44.71	▲0.97
LDP	Yūsuke Takahashi	89,745	37.93	
Ishin	Izumi Yamazaki	41,076	17.36	▲0.89
Majority			6.78	▼16.90
Turnout			52.60	▲22.14
CDP hold				

House of Representatives: 2021 Hokkaido 2nd district by-election
Party	Candidate	Votes	%	±%
CDP	Kenkō Matsuki	59,664	43.74	
Independent	Yoshiko Tsuruha	27,355	20.06	
Ishin	Izumi Yamazaki	22,459	16.47	
Independent	Takanori Nagatomo	15,738	11.54	
The Party to Protect the People from NHK	Tadayuki Saitō	5,630	4.13	
Independent	Satoru Kobayashi	5,552	4.07	
Majority			23.68	
Turnout			30.46	▼23.66
CDP gain from LDP		Swing		

2017
Party	Candidate	Votes	%	±%
LDP	Takamori Yoshikawa	104,824	41.35	▲4.55
Kibō no Tō	Kenkō Matsuki	74,425	29.36	N/A
JCP	Masatoshi Kanakura	52,626	20.76	▲4.86
Ishin	Yasufumi Owada	21,643	8.54	N/A
Majority		30,399	11.99	▼2.2
Turnout			57.12	
LDP hold		Swing		

2014
Party	Candidate	Votes	%	±%
LDP	Takamori Yoshikawa (endorsed by Kōmeitō)	88,667	38.8	▲3.8
Ishin	Kenkō Matsuki (endorsed by People's Life Party) (won PR seat)	56,375	24.7	did not run in previous election
Independent	Maki Ikeda	46,922	20.6	new
JCP	Masatoshi Kanakura	36,277	15.9	new

2012
Party	Candidate	Votes	%	±%
LDP	Takamori Yoshikawa (endorsed by Kōmeitō)	83,575	35.0	▲4.2
Democratic	Wakio Mitsui (endorsed by PNP)	55,520	23.2	▼31.0
Restoration	Miho Takahashi (won PR seat)	47,139	19.7	new
JCP	Hideko Ōta	28,183	11.8	new
Your	Ryūji Sawada	24,605	10.3	new

2009
Party	Candidate	Votes	%	±%
Democratic	Wakio Mitsui (endorsed by PNP)	165,267	54.2	+8.9
LDP	Takamori Yoshikawa (endorsed by Kōmeitō)	93,870	30.8	−14.5
JCP	Chiharu Oka	27,580	9.0	new
Social Democratic	Yumi Honda	14,311	4.7	new
Happiness Realization	Motomi Yamamoto	3,782	1.2	new

2005
Party	Candidate	Votes	%	±%
Democratic	Wakio Mitsui	129,357	45.3	
LDP	Takamori Yoshikawa (endorsed by Kōmeitō) (won PR seat)	127,031	44.5	
JCP	Masatoshi Kanakura	29,131	10.2	

2003
Party	Candidate	Votes	%	±%
Democratic	Wakio Mitsui (endorsed by SDP)	107,840	45.6	
LDP	Takamori Yoshikawa (endorsed by NCP)	83,573	35.3	
JCP	Ichirō Oda	24,259	10.3	
Independent	Yukiko Ishida (endorsed by Midori no Kaigi)	18,227	7.7	
Independent	Mitsunori Hirosaka	2,531	1.1	

2000
Party	Candidate	Votes	%	±%
LDP	Takamori Yoshikawa (endorsed by NCP)	76,276	31.2	
Democratic	Yukiko Ishida	63,965	26.1	
JCP	Tomoko Kami	60,461	24.7	
Independent	Shizuhiro Matsuki	19,775	8.1	
Social Democratic	Takao Asano	15,722	6.4	
Liberal League	Tsutomu Fujita	8,456	3.5	
Turnout		244,655	61.49	

1996
Party	Candidate	Votes	%	±%
New Frontier	Jun’ichi Osanai	73,697	34.7	
LDP	Takamori Yoshikawa	63,524	29.9	
JCP	Yukishi Yamane	48,273	22.8	
Liberal League	Shizuhiro Matsuki	20,009	9.4	
Youth Liberal Party	Ken’ichi Sawada	6,653	3.1	
Turnout		212,156	54.60	
