= Hokkaido 7th district =

Japan House of Representatives constituency

Hokkaidō 7th District
- Parliamentary constituency for the Japanese House of Representatives
- Numbered map of Hokkaidō Prefecture single-member districts
- Prefecture: Hokkaido
- Proportional District: Hokkaido
- Electorate: 253,134 (2021)

Current constituency
- Created: 1996, renamed in 2003
- Seats: One
- Party: Liberal Democratic
- Representative: Takako Suzuki
- Created from: Hokkaidō 5th district (1947–1993)
- Municipalities: Kushiro and Nemuro Subprefectures

Hokkaidō 7th district is a single-member constituency of the House of Representatives in the Diet of Japan. It is located in Japan's northernmost prefecture Hokkaidō. In a 2002 redistricting and reapportionment, Hokkaidō lost one seat and what had been the Hokkaido 13th district in the 1996 and 2000 general elections was renamed the 7th district. The previous 7th district was split up: the largest part merged into the 6th district and the remaining areas merged into the 10th and 12th districts.

== Electorate ==
The 7th district is located in Eastern Hokkaidō and covers the Kushiro and Nemuro subprefectures, in the Japanese viewpoint theoretically including the "Northern Territories (Southern Kuriles) administered by the Russian Federation. As of 2009, 278,402 eligible voters were registered in the district.

The district was represented by Liberal Democrat Yoshitaka Itō from 2009 to 2024. In the 2009 general election, the 7th district was the only district countrywide where a Democratic incumbent lost their seat and the only district in Hokkaidō won by the LDP. In the previous election of 2005 when the LDP won a landslide victory, it was one of few districts where a Democrat could unseat a Liberal Democratic incumbent.

== List of representatives ==
Representative	Party	Dates	Notes
Hokkaidō 13th district
Naoto Kitamura	NFP	1996 — 1997	Left NFP in 1997 and returned to the LDP
Naoto Kitamura	LDP	1997 — 2003	
Hokkaidō 7th district
Naoto Kitamura	LDP	2003 — 2005	Failed reelection in the Hokkaidō PR block
Hiroko Nakano	DPJ	2005 — 2009	Reelected in the Hokkaidō PR block
Yoshitaka Itō	LDP	2009 — 2024	
Takako Suzuki	LDP	2024 —	

== Election results ==
2026
Party	Candidate	Votes	%	±%
LDP	Takako Suzuki	89,336	65.7	▲7.4
Centrist Reform	Naoko Shinoda	46,588	34.3	▼7.4
Turnout			59.16	▲2.57
LDP hold				

2024
Party	Candidate	Votes	%	±%
LDP	Takako Suzuki	77,189	58.44	▲0.43
CDP	Naoko Shinoda	54,888	41.56	▲8.85
Turnout		132,077	56.59	▲0.40
LDP hold				

2021
Party	Candidate	Votes	%	±%
LDP	Yoshitaka Itō (Incumbent) (Endorsed by Kōmeitō)	80,797	58.01	▼8.6
CDP	Naoko Shinoda	45,563	32.71	
JCP	Akemi Ishikawa	12,913	9.27	▼24.1
Turnout			56.19	▲0.02
LDP hold				

2017
Party	Candidate	Votes	%	±%
LDP	Yoshitaka Itō (Incumbent) (Endorsed by Kōmeitō)	95,200	66.6	▲20.7
JCP	Akemi Ishikawa	47,740	33.4	▲25.0
Turnout			56.17	▼3.74
LDP hold				

2014
Party	Candidate	Votes	%	±%
LDP	Yoshitaka Itō (Endorsed by Kōmeitō)	72,281	45.88	▼2.3
Democratic	Takako Suzuki (elected by PR)	72,056	45.73	
JCP	Akemi Ishikawa	13,218	8.39	▲2.6

2012
Party	Candidate	Votes	%	±%
LDP	Yoshitaka Itō (Incumbent) (Endorsed by Kōmeitō)	72,945	47.2	
NP-Daichi	Takako Suzuki (endorsed by Tomorrow Party)	51,051	33.1	
Democratic	Hiroko Nakano (PR block incumbent) (Endorsed by PNP)	21,513	13.9	
JCP	Ryōko Sasaki	8,918	5.8	

2009
Party	Candidate	Votes	%	±%
LDP	Yoshitaka Itō (endorsed by Kōmeitō)	100,150	49.7	
Democratic	Hiroko Nakano (Incumbent) (Elected to PR block) (Endorsed by PNP)	99,236	49.2	
Happiness Realization	Sachiko Kanenari	2,131	1.1	
Turnout		205,413	73.91	

2005
Party	Candidate	Votes	%	±%
Democratic	Hiroko Nakano	95,473	48.3	
LDP	Naoto Kitamura (Incumbent) (Endorsed by Kōmeitō)	86,924	43.9	
JCP	Kazushige Murakami	15,438	7.8	
Turnout		204,442	71.37	

2003
Party	Candidate	Votes	%	±%
LDP	Naoto Kitamura (Incumbent) (Endorsed by NCP)	85,585	49.8	
Democratic	Hiroko Nakano (elected by PR) (Endorsed by SDP)	72,508	42.2	
JCP	Yasuhiko Yagi	13,617	7.9	
Turnout		177,431	61.52	

2000: Hokkaidō 13th district
Party	Candidate	Votes	%	±%
LDP	Naoto Kitamura (Incumbent) (Endorsed by NCP)	86,567	46.9	
Democratic	Hiroko Nakano	55,732	30.2	
Liberal	Toshiyuki Wanibuchi	25,169	13.6	
JCP	Tadashi Shibutani	16,055	8.7	
Others	Shin'ichi Katō	1,071	0.6	

1996: Hokkaidō 13th district
Party	Candidate	Votes	%	±%
New Frontier	Naoto Kitamura (Incumbent)	83,490	42.8	
LDP	Muneo Suzuki (elected by PR)	55,491	28.4	
Democratic	Atsushi Okada	41,565	21.3	
JCP	Akemi Ishikawa	14,736	7.5	
Turnout		198,436	68.83	
