= Maki Ikeda =

Japanese politician (born 1972)

- 池田 真紀
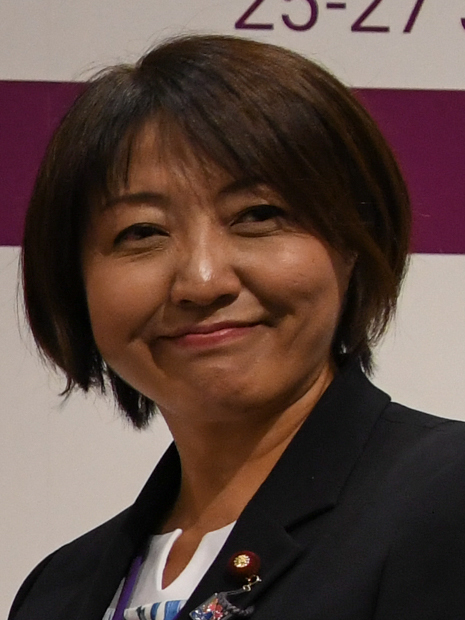
- Ikeda in 2019

Member of the House of Representatives
- In office 31 October 2024 – 23 January 2026
- Preceded by: Yoshiaki Wada
- Succeeded by: Yoshiaki Wada
- Constituency: Hokkaido 5th
- In office 27 October 2017 – 14 October 2021
- Constituency: Hokkaido PR

Personal details
- Born: 24 May 1972 (age 54) Itabashi, Tokyo, Japan
- Party: CRA (since 2026)
- Other political affiliations: CDP (2017–2026)
- Children: 2
- Education: Hokkaido University
- Website: ikemaki.jp

Maki Ikeda (池田 真紀, Ikeda Maki; born 24 May 1972) is a Japanese politician who served in the House of Representatives as a member of the Constitutional Democratic Party of Japan from 2024 to 2026, and from 2017 to 2021.

== Early life and education ==
Maki Ikeda was born in Itabashi, Japan, on 24 May 1972. She suffered abuse from her father before starting kindergarten. In junior high school she went to live with her grandmother after her mother and younger sister left the family due to her father's abuse. She graduated from Hokkaido University in 2015.

== Career ==
From 1997 to 2011, Ikeda worked at the Welfare Office in Itabashi. In 2011, she moved from Tokyo to Hokkaido.

In the 2014 election Ikeda ran as an independent candidate in Hokkaido 2nd district, but lost. She ran in Hokkaido 5th district for a 2016 by-election, but lost to Yoshiaki Wada. She ran for the seat again in the 2017 election as a Constitutional Democratic Party of Japan candidate and received fewer votes than Wada, but obtained enough votes to be returned through the CDP's PR block list.

Ikeda lost reelection in 2021, but was elected in 2024. Ikeda was an independent candidate in the 2023 Hokkaido gubernatorial election, but lost.

== Personal life ==
Ikeda married at age 18 and had two children before her husband abandoned her due to his large amount of debt. She is a single mother of two children.

== Political positions ==
Ikeda supports recognising same-sex marriage and allowing couples to retain their maiden name after marriage. She believes that the prime minister should not visit the Yasukuni Shrine. She supports adhering to the Three Non-Nuclear Principles and does not support expanding Japan's military.

== Works cited ==
=== News ===
- "Asahi Shimbun and the University of Tokyo's Taniguchi Laboratory joint survey". The Asahi Shimbun. Archived from the original on 5 July 2025.
- "Domestic violence, family separation... Constitutional Democratic Party lawmaker Maki Ikeda's past". Josei Jishin. 13 November 2017. Archived from the original on 5 July 2025.
- "Early results of single-seat constituency votes: Hokkaido (12 seats)". The Asahi Shimbun. Archived from the original on 5 July 2025.

=== Web ===
- "April 24, 2016: House of Representatives by-election for Hokkaido 5th District - Voting and Counting Report". Hokkaido. Archived from the original on 2 November 2021.
- "Profile". Maki Ikeda. Archived from the original on 5 July 2025.
