= Takamori Yoshikawa =

Japanese politician

- 吉川 貴盛
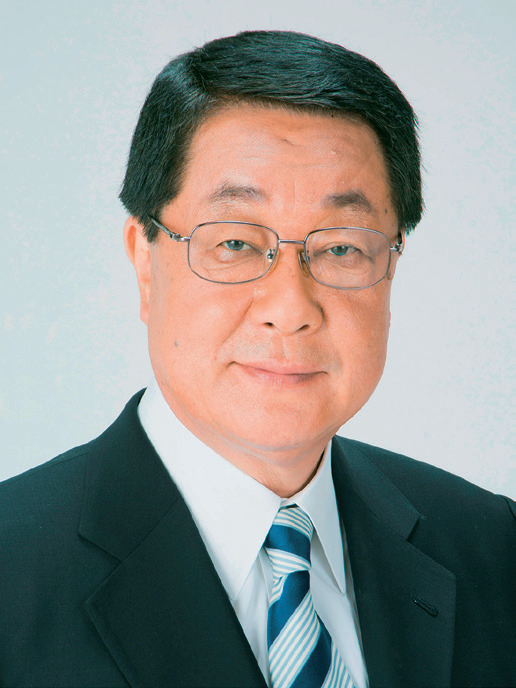
- Official portrait, 2013

Minister of Agriculture, Forestry and Fisheries
- In office 2 October 2018 – 11 September 2019
- Prime Minister: Shinzo Abe
- Preceded by: Ken Saitō
- Succeeded by: Taku Etō

Member of the House of Representatives
- In office 16 December 2012 – 21 December 2020
- Preceded by: Wakio Mitsui
- Succeeded by: Kenko Matsuki
- Constituency: Hokkaido 2nd
- In office 16 September 2005 – 21 July 2009
- Constituency: Hokkaido PR
- In office 25 October 1996 – 10 October 2003
- Preceded by: Constituency established
- Succeeded by: Wakio Mitsui
- Constituency: Hokkaido PR (1996–2000); Hokkaido 2nd (2000–2003)

Member of the Hokkaido Legislative Assembly
- In office 1991–1995
- Constituency: Higashi Ward
- In office 1979–1987
- Constituency: Higashi Ward

Personal details
- Born: 20 October 1950 (age 76) Suginami, Tokyo, Japan
- Party: Liberal Democratic
- Education: Nihon University College of Economics; Hokkaido University (2007)

Takamori Yoshikawa (吉川 貴盛, Yoshikawa Takamori; born 20 October 1950) is a Japanese politician of the Liberal Democratic Party who served as the Minister of Agriculture, Forestry and Fisheries and as a member of the House of Representatives the Hokkaido 2nd district in the Diet.

== Early life ==
Yoshikawa was born in Tokyo and grew up in Yoichi, Hokkaido. He became a graduate of Nihon University.

== Political career ==
Yoshikawa was elected to the first of his three terms in the Hokkaido Legislative Assembly in 1979 and then to the House of Representatives for the first time in 1996.

On 2 October 2018, Yoshikawa took office as the Minister of Agriculture, Forestry and Fisheries to 11 September 2019.

=== Scandal and resignation ===
In late 2020, Yoshikawa was accused of accepting multiple bribes totalling ¥5 million from Hiroshima-based Akita Foods between October 2018 and September 2019, during his time as agriculture minister.

On 21 December 2020, Yoshikawa announced his resignation from the Diet, citing health reasons and saying he "will not be able to carry out activities that will fulfill the mandate of the people".

Opposition Constitutional Democratic Party of Japan secretary general Tetsuro Fukuyama said he "feel[s] it is wrong to resign without a single explanation concerning the allegations".
