= Kenko Matsuki =

Japanese politician

- 松木 謙公
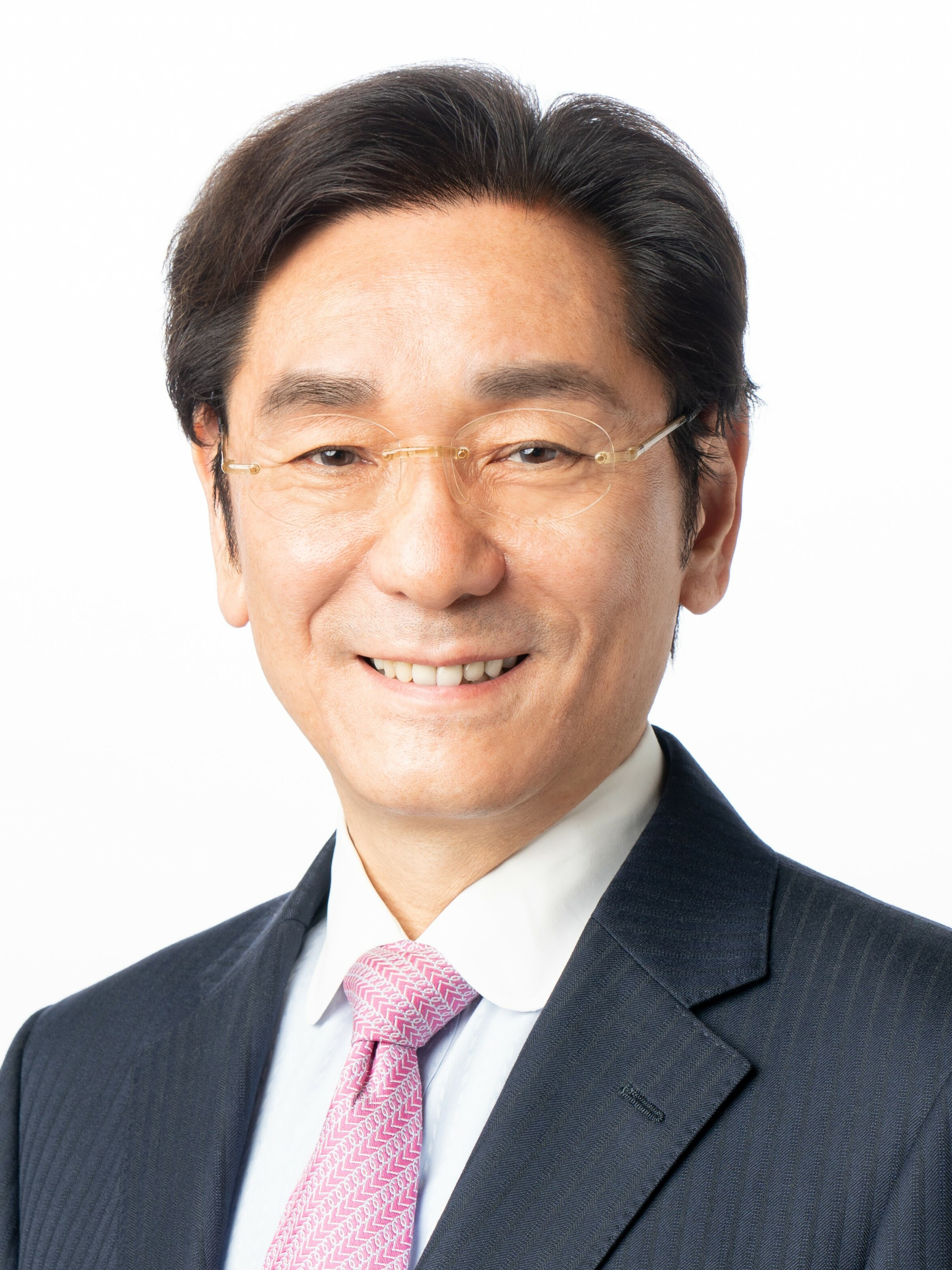
- Official portrait, 2021

Member of the House of Representatives
- In office 27 April 2021 – 23 January 2026
- Preceded by: Takamori Yoshikawa
- Succeeded by: Yusuke Takahashi
- Constituency: Hokkaido 2nd
- In office 19 December 2014 – 28 September 2017
- Preceded by: Miho Takahashi
- Succeeded by: Multi-member district
- Constituency: Hokkaido PR
- In office 10 November 2003 – 16 November 2012
- Preceded by: Multi-member district
- Succeeded by: Arata Takebe
- Constituency: Hokkaido PR (2003–2009); Hokkaido 12th (2009–2012)

Personal details
- Born: 22 February 1959 (age 67) Sapporo, Hokkaido, Japan
- Party: CRA (since 2026)
- Other political affiliations: LDP (before 1994); LL (1994–1998); LP (1998–2003); DPJ (2003–2010); NPD (2010–2014); JIP (2014–2016); DP (2016–2017); KnT (2017–2018); DPP (2018–2020); CDP (2020–2026)
- Education: Aoyama Gakuin University

Kenko Matsuki (松木 謙公, Matsuki Kenkō / Matsuki Shizuhiro; born 22 February 1959) is a Japanese politician and a member of the House of Representatives in the Diet.

== Political career ==
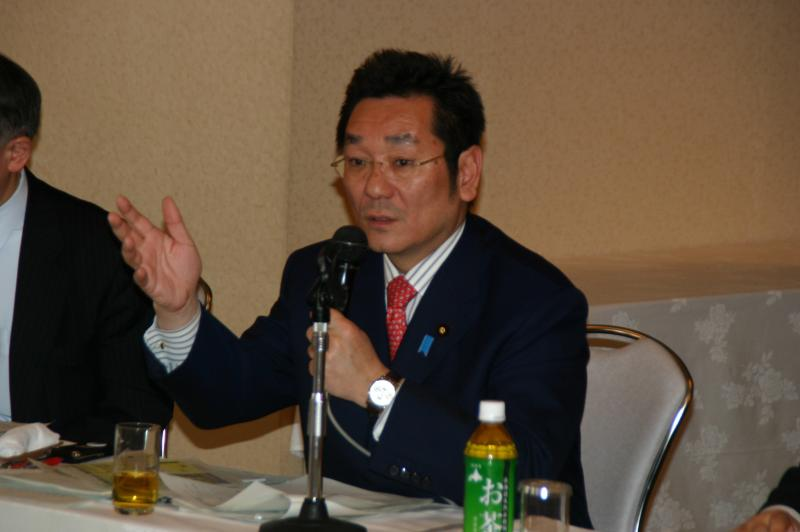
Matsuki in 2011

A native of Sapporo, Hokkaido and graduate of Aoyama Gakuin University, he was elected to the House of Representatives for the first time in 2003 after unsuccessful runs in 1996 and 2000.

In 2010, Matsuki was expelled from the Democratic Party of Japan for voting in favor of a no-confidence motion in then-Prime Minister Naoto Kan. He was expelled from the party the same day and served the rest of the term as an independent. He ran for reelection in 2012 and 2013 as a member of the New Party Daichi, but lost. In 2014 he ran as a candidate of the Japan Innovation Party and gained a Diet seat through the Hokkaido proportional representation block. In 2021 he won the Hokkaido 2nd district as a member of the Constitutional Democratic Party after the LDP incumbent resigned over corruption accusations.

Matsuki is affiliated to the openly revisionist organization Nippon Kaigi.
