= Arata Takebe =

Japanese politician

- 武部 新
- Official portrait, 2026

Minister of Agriculture, Forestry and Fisheries
- Incumbent
- Assumed office 15 October 2026
- Prime Minister: Sanae Takaichi
- Preceded by: Kazuo Yana

Member of the House of Representatives
- Incumbent
- Assumed office 16 December 2012
- Preceded by: Kenko Matsuki
- Constituency: Hokkaido 12th

Personal details
- Born: 20 July 1970 (age 56) Shari, Hokkaido, Japan
- Party: Liberal Democratic
- Parent: Tsutomu Takebe (father)
- Relatives: Mikio Fujita (brother-in-law)
- Education: Sapporo Minami High School; Waseda University; University of Chicago

Arata Takebe (born 20 July 1970) is a Japanese politician of the Liberal Democratic Party, who is serving as a member of the House of Representatives for Hokkaido 12th district since 2012. He is the son of Tsutomu Takebe, who also served as a member of the House of Representatives.Serves us Minister of Agriculture, Forestry and Fisheries from October 2026.

== Early life and education ==
Takebe was born in Shari, Hokkaido in 1970 and he later attended Sapporo Minami High School. After graduating from the Waseda University Faculty of Law (International Organization Law Seminar), he joined the Industrial Bank of Japan.

After leaving the bank in 2000, he studied abroad at the University of Chicago, and completed a master's degree at the University of Chicago's Graduate School of Public Policy in 2003. In the same year, he served as secretary to his father Tsutomu Takebe.

== Political career ==
In the 2012 election, when his father retired, he ran in the Hokkaido 12th district after being recruited by the Liberal Democratic Party's Hokkaido chapter (effectively inheriting his father's base). He won his first election by defeating Kenko Matsuki, who had defeated his father in the 2009 election.

He was re-elected in the 2014 election with 53.43% of the vote.

In August 2017, he was appointed Parliamentary Vice Minister of the Environment and Parliamentary Vice Minister of Cabinet Office in the Third Abe Cabinet (Third Reshuffle). He was also re-elected for a third term in the 2017 election of the House of Representatives in the same year.

In October 2021, he was appointed Vice-Minister of Agriculture, Forestry and Fisheries in the First Kishida Cabinet.

In the 2021 election he was elected for a fourth term, after defeating Hideyo Kawarada, a former Abashiri City Council member endorsed by the Constitutional Democratic Party, and Makoto Sugawara, endorsed by the Japanese Communist Party.

In the 2024 LDP presidential election, he was listed as a supporter of Takayuki Kobayashi. He voted for Kobayashi in the first round but did not disclose who he would vote for in the runoff election when interviewed by the Hokkaido Shimbun.

On 3 October of the same year, he was appointed Vice Minister of Education, Culture, Sports, Science and Technology in the First Ishiba Cabinet.

Takebe was elected for a fifth term in the 2024 election on 31 October 2024.

On October 15, 2026, Appointed Minister of Agriculture, Forestry and Fisheries in the second Takaichi Cabinet.

== Corruption scandal ==
In the 2012 election, the representative director and managing director of Wakkanai Port Facilities Co., Ltd., who was the deputy secretary-general of Takebe's support group, was arrested on 22 December of the same year on suspicion of violating the Public Offices Election Act (bribery of campaigners).
