= Yoshitaka Itō =

Japanese politician (born 1948)

- 伊東 良孝
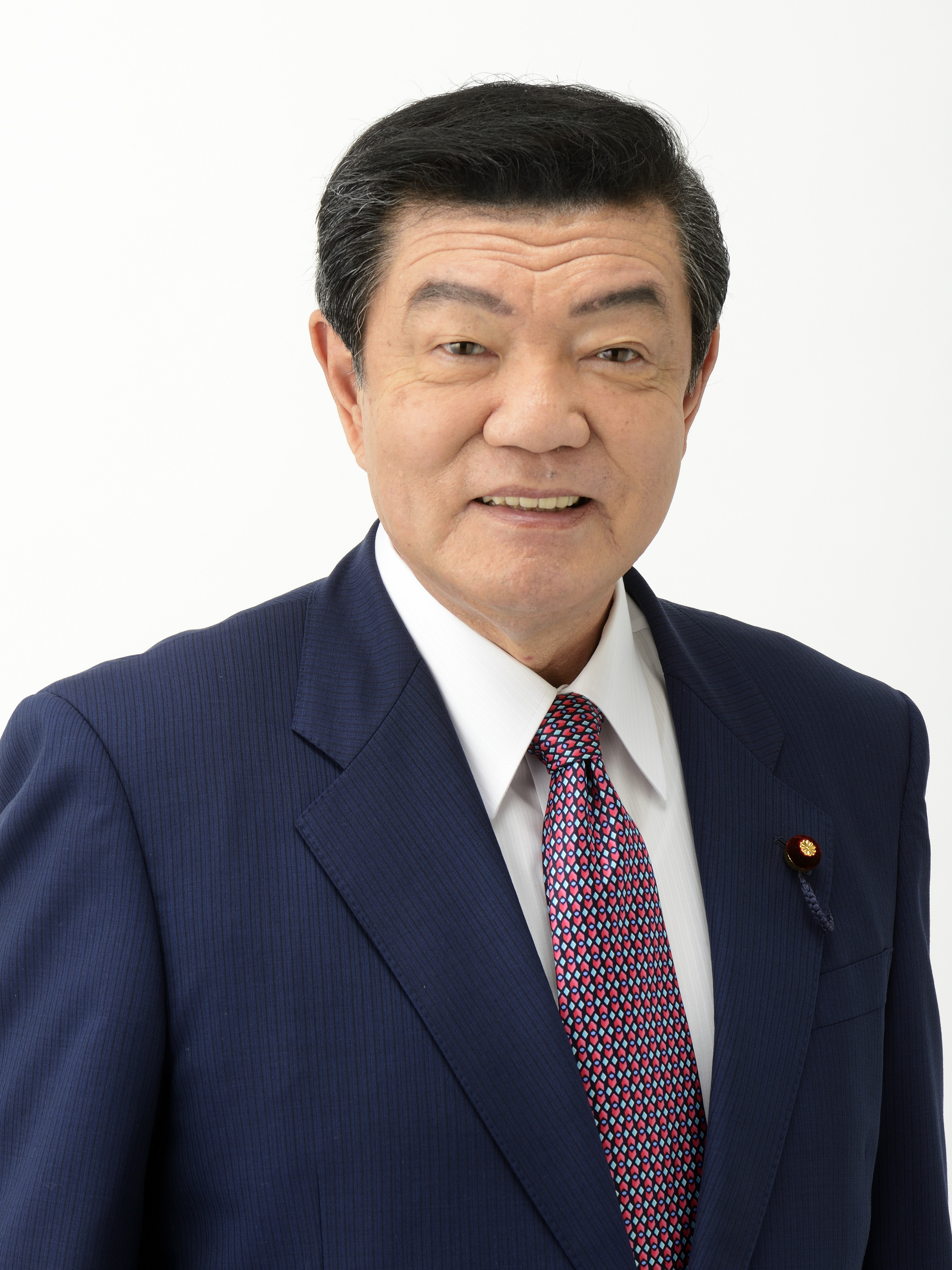
- Official portrait, 2020

Member of the House of Representatives
- Incumbent
- Assumed office 31 August 2009
- Preceded by: Hiroko Nakano
- Constituency: Hokkaido 7th (2009–2024); Hokkaido PR (2024–present)

Mayor of Kushiro
- In office 24 October 2005 – 2 October 2008
- Preceded by: Himself
- Succeeded by: Hiroya Ebina
- In office 16 December 2002 – 10 October 2005
- Preceded by: Kensuke Watanuki
- Succeeded by: Himself

Member of the Hokkaido Legislative Assembly
- In office 1995–2002
- Constituency: Kushiro City

Member of the Kushiro City Assembly
- In office 1985–1995

Personal details
- Born: 24 November 1948 (age 77) Asahikawa, Hokkaido, Japan
- Party: Liberal Democratic
- Education: Hokkaido University of Education

Yoshitaka Itō (born 24 November 1948) is a Japanese politician, who has served as a member of the House of Representatives from Hokkaido since 2009. He is a member of the Liberal Democratic Party.
