= Hiroyuki Nakamura =

Japanese politician

- 中村 裕之
- Official portrait, 2025

Member of the House of Representatives
- Incumbent
- Assumed office 16 December 2012
- Preceded by: Yoshio Hachiro
- Constituency: Hokkaido 4th (2012–2024); Hokkaido PR (2024–2026); Hokkaido 4th (2026–present)

Member of the Hokkaido Legislative Assembly
- In office 2003–2012
- Constituency: Shiribeshi Subprefecture

Personal details
- Born: 23 February 1961 (age 65) Yoichi, Hokkaido, Japan
- Party: Liberal Democratic (Shikōkai)
- Education: Hokkai Gakuen University

Hiroyuki Nakamura (中村 ひろゆき, born 23 February 1961) is a Japanese politician who is serving in the House of Representatives as a representative from the Hokkaido since 2012. He is a member of the Liberal Democratic Party.
