= Takahiro Sasaki =

Japanese politician

- 佐々木 隆博
- Official portrait, 2009

Member of the House of Representatives
- In office 15 December 2014 – 14 October 2021
- Preceded by: Hiroshi Imazu
- Succeeded by: Kuniyoshi Azuma
- Constituency: Hokkaido 6th
- In office 11 September 2005 – 16 November 2012
- Preceded by: Hiroshi Imazu
- Succeeded by: Hiroshi Imazu
- Constituency: Hokkaido 6th

Member of the Hokkaido Legislative Assembly
- In office 1987–2005
- Constituency: Shibetsu City

Personal details
- Born: 10 March 1949 (age 77) Shibetsu, Hokkaido, Japan
- Party: CDP (since 2017)
- Other political affiliations: JSP (1987–1996); SDP (1996–1998); DPJ (1998–2016); DP (2016–2017)
- Education: Shibetsu High School
- Website: Official website

Takahiro Sasaki (佐々木 隆博, Sasaki Takahiro; born 10 March 1949) is a former Japanese politician of the Constitutional Democratic Party of Japan, who served as a member of the House of Representatives in the Diet (national legislature).

== Biography ==
A native of Shibetsu, Hokkaidō and high school graduate, he was elected to the House of Representatives for the first time in 2005 after having served in the assembly of Hokkaidō for five terms.
