= Yoshiaki Wada =

Japanese politician

- 和田 義明
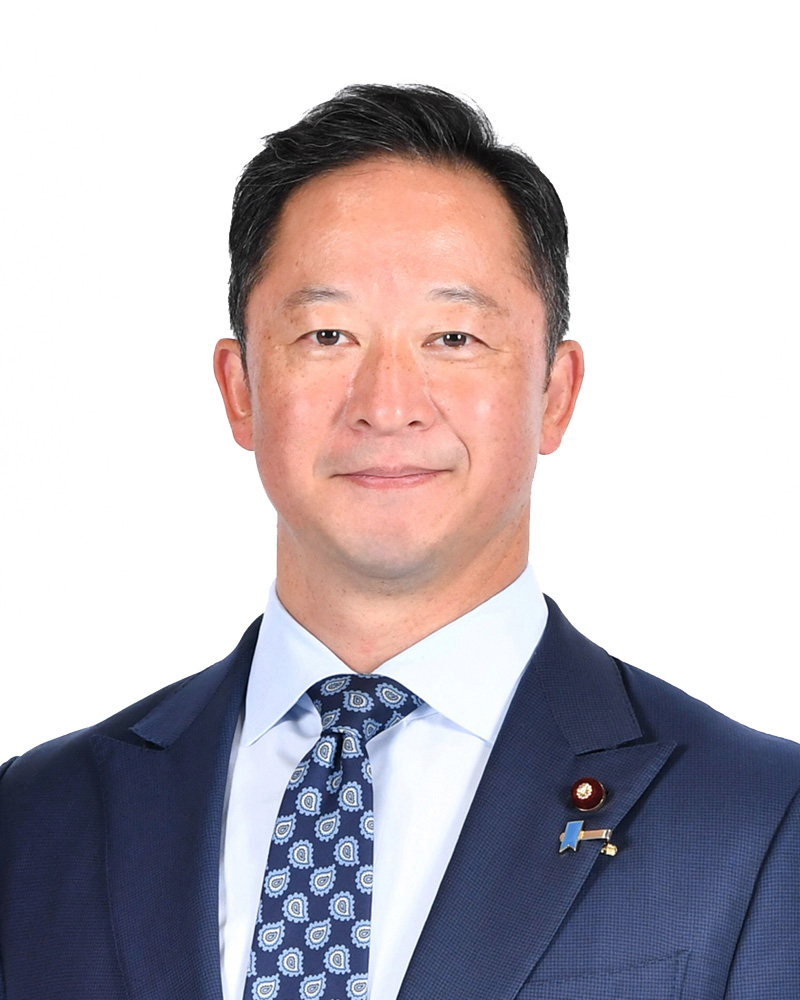
- Official portrait, 2023

Member of the House of Representatives
- Incumbent
- Assumed office 9 February 2026
- Preceded by: Maki Ikeda
- Constituency: Hokkaido 5th
- In office 27 April 2016 – 9 October 2024
- Preceded by: Nobutaka Machimura
- Succeeded by: Maki Ikeda
- Constituency: Hokkaido 5th

Personal details
- Born: 10 October 1971 (age 55) Osaka Prefecture, Japan
- Party: Liberal Democratic
- Education: Waseda University

Yoshiaki Wada (born 10 October 1971) is a Japanese politician. From 2016 to 2024 he was a member of the House of Representatives from Hokkaido 5th district. He is a member of the Liberal Democratic Party.
