= Hokkaido 5th district =

Japan House of Representatives constituency

Hokkaidō 5th District
- Parliamentary constituency for the Japanese House of Representatives
- Numbered map of Hokkaidō Prefecture single-member districts

- Sapporo-area detail
- Prefecture: Hokkaidō
- Proportional District: Hokkaidō
- Electorate: 427,594(2026)

Current constituency
- Created: 1994
- Seats: One
- Party: LDP
- Representative: Yoshiaki Wada
- Created from: Hokkaido's 1st medium sized district
- Municipalities: Sapporo's Atsubetsu Ward and Ishikari Subprefecture

Hokkaidō 5th district (Hokkaidō [dai-]go-ku (北海道[第]5区)) is a constituency of the House of Representatives in the Diet of Japan. It consists of Atsubetsu ward and a portion of Shiroishi ward in Hokkaido's city of Sapporo and Ishikari Subprefecture excluding Sapporo and Ishikari city. As of 2009, 453,752 eligible voters were registered in the district.

The district was created in the 1994 electoral reform from parts of the previous 1st district where six representatives had been elected by single-non-transferable vote. Representatives from the old 1st district included Kingo Machimura and his son Nobutaka Machimura.

Nobutaka Machimura (LDP, Machimura faction) safely won the new 5th district in the 1996 election and defended it against Democratic challenger Chiyomi Kobayashi in subsequent elections. However, the Democratic Party won the general election of 2009 handily, and Kobayashi defeated Machimura by 30,000 votes. In response to a political funds scandal, she resigned in June 2010. Machimura resigned from his seat in the Hokkaidō proportional block to run in the resulting by-election in October 2010 and defeated former construction ministry bureaucrat Shigeyuki Nakamae by a clear margin to regain his district seat.

In the 24 April 2016 by-election, Machimura's son-in-law, Liberal Democrat Yoshiaki Wada (Kōmeitō, Kokoro, Daichi) defeated united opposition independent Maki Ikeda (DP, JCP, SDP, PLP). Wada held the seat until he lost to Ikeda in the 2024 election. Wada was accused of receiving 'dark money' in the 2023–2024 Japanese slush fund scandal. Subsequently, the LDP did not allow Wada to run in the Hokkaidō PR block and he lost his seat in the Diet.

== List of representatives ==
Representative	Party	Dates	Notes
Nobutaka Machimura	LDP	1996–2009	Reelected in the Hokkaidō PR block
Chiyomi Kobayashi	DPJ	2009–2010	Resigned on 17 June 2010
Vacant (June – October 2010)
Nobutaka Machimura	LDP	2010–2015	Died in office
Vacant (2015–2016)
Yoshiaki Wada	LDP	2016 – 2024	
Maki Ikeda	CDP	2024 – 2026	Also lost in the PR block
Yoshiaki Wada	LDP	2026 –	

== Election results ==
2026
Party	Candidate	Votes	%	±%
LDP	Yoshiaki Wada	143,229	57.5	▲15.9
Centrist Reform	Maki Ikeda	105,844	42.5	▼9.2
Turnout		249,073	60.21	▲2.01
LDP gain from Centrist Reform				

2024
Party	Candidate	Votes	%	±%
CDP	Maki Ikeda	125,444	51.7	▲11.4
LDP	Yoshiaki Wada	100,893	41.6	▼9.0
JCP	Ryūji Suzuki	16,399	6.8	▲0.7
Turnout			58.20	▼2.02
CDP gain from LDP				

2021
Party	Candidate	Votes	%	±%
LDP	Yoshiaki Wada (endorsed by Kōmeitō)	139,950	50.60	▲0.76
CDP	Maki Ikeda	111,366	40.26	▼7.23
JCP	Mika Hashimoto	16,758	6.06	
Independent	Shintarō Ōtsu	8,520	3.08	
Majority			10.34	▲7.99
Turnout			60.22	▼2.23
LDP hold		Swing	▲3.99	

2017
Party	Candidate	Votes	%	±%
LDP	Yoshiaki Wada (endorsed by Kōmeitō and NPD)	142,687	49.84	▼2.54
CDP	Maki Ikeda (elected by PR)	135,948	47.49	▼0.13
Happiness Realization	Yoshinori Moriyama	7,632	2.67	N/A
Majority		6,739	2.35	▼2.39
Turnout			62.55	▲4.92
LDP hold		Swing	▼1.21	

House of Representatives: 2016 Hokkaido 5th district by-election
Party	Candidate	Votes	%	±%
LDP	Yoshiaki Wada (endorsed by Kōmeitō, PFG, NPD)	135,842	52.38	▲1.43
Independent	Maki Ikeda (endorsed by DP, JCP, SDP, TPJ)	123,517	47.62	N/A
Rejected ballots		3,015	1.15	
Majority		12,325	4.74	▼9.39
Turnout		262,374	57.63	▼0.80
LDP hold		Swing	N/A	

2014
Party	Candidate	Votes	%	±%
LDP	Nobutaka Machimura (endorsed by Kōmeitō)	131,394	50.95	
Democratic	Kenji Katsube	94,975	36.82	
JCP	Ryūji Suzuki	31,523	12.23	
Turnout			58.43	

2012
Party	Candidate	Votes	%	±%
LDP	Nobutaka Machimura (endorsed by Kōmeitō)	128,435	48.62	
Democratic	Shigeyuki Nakamae	69,075	26.15	
Your	Yūji Nishida (endorsed by JRP)	41,025	15.53	
JCP	Ryūji Suzuki	21,422	8.11	
Happiness Realization	Yoshinori Moriyama	4,200	1.59	

2010 by-election
Party	Candidate	Votes	%	±%
LDP	Nobutaka Machimura	125,636	52.3	
Democratic	Shigeyuki Nakamae	94,135	39.2	
JCP	Satoshi Miyauchi	15,583	6.5	
Independent	Michiko Kawamura	2,697	1.1	
Happiness Realization	Yoshinori Moriyama	2,325	1.0	
Turnout		242,932	53.48	

2009
Party	Candidate	Votes	%	±%
Democratic	Chiyomi Kobayashi (endorsed by PNP)	182,952	53.8	
LDP	Nobutaka Machimura (endorsed by Kōmeitō) (elected by PR)	151,448	44.6	
Happiness Realization	Yasunori Hatano	5,380	1.6	
Turnout		345,458	76.32	

2005
Party	Candidate	Votes	%	±%
LDP	Nobutaka Machimura (endorsed by Kōmeitō)	173,947	54.2	
Democratic	Chiyomi Kobayashi	124,547	38.8	
JCP	Takahiro Yamazaki	22,521	7.0	
Turnout		325,642	73.18	

2003
Party	Candidate	Votes	%	±%
LDP	Nobutaka Machimura (endorsed by Kōmeitō, NCP)	129,035	47.0	
Democratic	Chiyomi Kobayashi (endorsed by SDP) (elected by PR)	120,192	43.7	
JCP	Satoshi Miyauchi	25,603	9.3	
Turnout		280,993	64.06	

2000
Party	Candidate	Votes	%	±%
LDP	Nobutaka Machimura (endorsed by Kōmeitō, NCP)	123,680	46.0	
Democratic	Chiyomi Kobayashi	84,631	31.4	
JCP	Satoshi Miyauchi	35,006	13.0	
Liberal	Kentarō Ono	25,845	9.6	

1996
Party	Candidate	Votes	%	±%
LDP	Nobutaka Machimura	113,282	49.8	
New Frontier	Kentarō Ono	61,846	27.2	
JCP	Satoshi Miyauchi	44,885	19.7	
Liberal League	Marie Ikenaka	7,576	3.3	
Turnout		240,442	60.53	
