= Hokkaido 12th district =

Japan House of Representatives constituency

Hokkaidō 12th District
- Parliamentary constituency for the Japanese House of Representatives
- Numbered map of Hokkaidō Prefecture single-member districts
- Prefecture: Hokkaido
- Proportional District: Hokkaido
- Electorate: 265,083 (2026)
- Major settlements: Kitami City, Abashiri, Monbetsu and Wakkanai

Current constituency
- Created: 1994
- Seats: One
- Party: LDP
- Representative: Arata Takebe
- Municipalities: Sōya Subprefecture and Okhotsk Subprefecture

Hokkaidō 12th District (北海道第12区) is an electoral district for the House of Representatives, the lower house of the national Diet of Japan. The district was established in 1994 and had major boundary changes in 2002 and 2017.

== Area ==
The 12th District is in northern Hokkaido. It covers the areas of Sōya Subprefecture and Okhotsk Subprefecture; this includes the cities of Kitami, Abashiri, Monbetsu, and Wakkanai. It occupies about one-sixth of the area of Hokkaido and is the largest constituency in the House of Representatives (14,740.93 km^{2}, the same as Iwate Prefecture).

In 2002, the Soya Branch Office was transferred to the 7th district of Hokkaido. In 2017, The town of Horonobe was moved from the 10th district to the 12th district.

== List of representatives ==
Representative	Party	Dates	Notes
Tsutomu Takebe	LDP	1996 – 2009	Former Minister of Agriculture, Forestry and Fisheries
Kenkō Matsuki	DPJ	2009 – 2012	
Arata Takebe	LDP	2012 –	Incumbent

== Election results ==
2026
Party	Candidate	Votes	%	±%
LDP	Arata Takebe	92,400	58.8	▲6.46
Centrist Reform	Eisei Kawaharada	64,719	41.2	▼6.46
Turnout		157,119	61.13	▲4.10
LDP hold				

2024
Party	Candidate	Votes	%	±%
LDP	Arata Takebe	78,645	52.34	▼6.09
CDP	Eisei Kawaharada (elected in Hokkaido PR)	17,608	47.66	▲14.55
Turnout		150,253	57.03	▼2.79

2021
Party	Candidate	Votes	%	±%
LDP	Arata Takebe	97,634	58.43	▲4.29
CDP	Eisei Kawaharada	55,321	33.11	
JCP	Makoto Sugawara	14,140	8.46	▼4.86
Majority			25.32	▲3.70
Turnout			59.82	▼1.66
LDP hold		Swing		

2017
Party	Candidate	Votes	%	±%
LDP	Arata Takebe	97,113	54.1	
Kibo	Mika Minakami	58,422	32.6	
JCP	Makoto Sugawara	23,830	13.3	
Turnout		179,365	61.48	
LDP hold		Swing		

2014
Party	Candidate	Votes	%	±%
LDP	Arata Takebe	92,357	53.4	
DPJ	Mika Minakami	62,035	35.9	
JCP	Makoto Sugawara	18,451	10.7	
Turnout		172,843	58.70	
LDP hold		Swing		

2012
Party	Candidate	Votes	%	±%
LDP	Arata Takebe	91,208	50.3	
NPD	Kenkō Matsuki	52,976	29.2	
DPJ	Maya Yamazaki	25,501	14.1	
JCP	Makoto Sugawara	11,532	6.4	
Turnout		181,217	60.52	
LDP hold		Swing		

2009
Party	Candidate	Votes	%	±%
DPJ	Kenkō Matsuki	127,166	52.4	
LDP	Tsutomu Takebe	112,690	46.4	
HRP	Kasamatsu Nagatoro	2,763	1.1	
Turnout		242,619		
Democratic gain from LDP		Swing		

2005
Party	Candidate	Votes	%	±%
LDP	Tsutomu Takebe	124,465	51.6	
DPJ	Kenkō Matsuki	101,835	42.2	
JCP	Makoto Sugawara	14,882	6.2	
Turnout		241,182		
LDP hold		Swing		
