= Nishioka =

Nishioka (written: 西岡 lit. "western hill") is a Japanese surname. Notable people with the surname include:

- Daiki Nishioka (西岡 大輝, born 1988), Japanese footballer
- Haru Nishioka (西岡 ハル, 1905–1983), Japanese businessman and politician
- Hayward Nishioka (born 1942), American judoka
- Kenta Nishioka (西岡 謙太, born 1987), Japanese footballer
- Risa Nishioka (西岡 里紗, born 1997), Japanese women's basketball player
- Rodger Nishioka, American educator
- Shiho Nishioka (西岡 詩穂, born 1989), Japanese fencer
- Takeo Nishioka (西岡 武夫, 1936–2011), Japanese politician
- Toshiaki Nishioka (西岡 利晃, born 1976), Japanese boxer
- Tsunekazu Nishioka (西岡 常一, 1908–1995), Japanese carpenter
- Nishioka Tsuneo (西岡 常夫, 1924–2014), Japanese martial artist
- Tsutomu Nishioka (西岡 力, born 1956), Japanese academic
- Tsuyoshi Nishioka (西岡 剛, born 1984), Japanese baseball player
- Yoshie Nishioka (西岡 由恵, born 1974), Japanese swimmer
- Yoshihito Nishioka (西岡 良仁, born 1995), Japanese tennis player
- Ryusei Nishioka (西岡隆成, born 2003), Japanese trampoline gymnast
