= Nagasaki 2nd district =

Legislative district of Japan

Nagasaki 2nd District
- 長崎県第2区
- Parliamentary constituency for the Japanese House of Representatives
- Prefecture: Nagasaki
- Proportional Block: Kyushu
- Electorate: 400,352 (as of 1 September 2023)

Current constituency
- Created: 1994
- Seats: One
- Party: LDP
- Representative: Ryusho Kato

Nagasaki 2nd district is a constituency of the House of Representatives in the Diet of Japan located in Nagasaki prefecture. The district covers a southern part of the prefecture as well as a few outlying islands.

Before the electoral reform of 1994, the area was part of the multi-member Nagasaki 1st district where five Representatives had been elected by single non-transferable vote.

The district had been a safe LDP district from its creation until the landslide election of 2009 when incumbent Liberal Democrat Fumio Kyūma, former defence minister in the Hashimoto and Abe cabinets, lost his seat to Democrat newcomer Eriko Fukuda by 14,000 votes at record turnout.

Due to reapportionment, Nagasaki lost one seat in 2022 and the boundaries of the district changed. The city of Ōmura and the islands of Iki and Tsushima were transferred to the district from the Nagasaki 3rd district and an area belonging to the City of Nagasaki (the former towns of Kinkai and Sotome) was moved to the 1st district.

== Area ==
=== Kyūshū Island ===
- Isahaya
- Shimabara
- Minamishimabara
- Ōmura
- Unzen
- Towns of Nishisonogi District

=== Islands ===
- Iki
- Tsushima

== List of representatives ==
Representative	Party	Dates	Notes
Fumio Kyūma	LDP	1996 – 2009	Failed reelection in the Kyūshū PR block
Eriko Fukuda	DPJ	2009 – 2012	On 16 November 2012, she submitted her resignation from the DPJ and joined Green Wind
Eriko Fukuda	Green Wind	2012	Ran in the 2012 general election under the banner of the Japan Future Party, but failed to be re-elected to the Kinki PR
Kanji Kato	LDP	2012 – 2021	Retired in 2021 due to ongoing health problems
Ryusho Kato	LDP	2021 –	Incumbent

== Election results ==
2026
Party	Candidate	Votes	%	±%
LDP	Ryusho Kato (incumbent)	126,751	56.3	▲9.96
Centrist Reform	Katsuhiko Yamada	72,951	32.4	▼7.05
Sanseitō	Satoko Takaki	25,481	11.3	▲3.89
Majority		53,800	23.9	▲17.01
Registered electors		391,976		
Turnout		225,183	58.55	▲5.15
LDP hold				

2024
Party	Candidate	Votes	%	±%
Liberal Democratic (endorsed by Komeito)	Ryusho Kato (incumbent)	96,095	46.34	▼11.87
CDP	Katsuhiko Yamada (elected via PR)	81,808	39.45	▼2.34
Communist	Yukiko Yano	15,106	7.34	New
Sanseitō	Satoko Takagi	15,365	7.41	New
Innovation	Tomohiro Yokota	14,098	6.80	New
Majority		14,287	6.89	▼9.53
Registered electors		396,341		
Turnout		207,366	53.40	▼3.63
LDP hold				

2021
Party	Candidate	Votes	%	±%
LDP	Ryusho Kato (Endorsed by Komeito)	95,271	58.2	
CDP	Koichi Matsudaira	68,405	41.8	
Turnout				

2017
Party	Candidate	Votes	%	±%
LDP	Kanji Kato (Endorsed by Komeito)	97,874	57.4	
Kibō no Tō	Hatsumi Yamaguchi (Endorsed by the DP)	57,538	33.7	
JCP	Kazuu Kondo	15,261	8.9	
Turnout				

2014
Party	Candidate	Votes	%	±%
LDP	Kanji Kato (Endorsed by Komeito)	86,539	52.8	
Democratic	Yukishige Okubo	65,924	40.3	
JCP	Katsumi Yazaki	11,228	6.9	
Turnout				

2012
Party	Candidate	Votes	%	±%
LDP	Kanji Kato (Endorsed by Komeito)	93,448	48.2	
Independent	Shintaro Okumura	51,002	26.3	
Democratic	Takahiro Kawagoe (Endorsed by the PNP)	36,602	18.9	
JCP	Katsumi Yazaki	9,240	9.9	
Independent	Fumiyoshi Mori	3,625	1.9	
Turnout				

2009
Party	Candidate	Votes	%	±%
Democratic	Eriko Fukuda (Endorsed by PNP)	120,672	50.4	
LDP	Fumio Kyūma (Incumbent (Endorsed by Kōmeitō)	106,206	44.3	
Independent	Kiyoko Aura	5,703	2.4	
Independent	Toshiro Yamazaki	5,070	2.1	
Happiness Realization	Ai Shibata	1,947	0.8	
Turnout		243,192	72.87	

2005
Party	Candidate	Votes	%	±%
LDP	Fumio Kyūma	123,324	54.8	
Democratic	Yukishige Okubo	88,472	39.4	
JCP	Eiko Fuchise	13,088	5.8	
Turnout		229,077	67.63	

2003
Party	Candidate	Votes	%	±%
LDP	Fumio Kyūma	126,705	65.3	
Social Democratic	Masako Kumae	50,772	26.2	
JCP	Kanji Ishimaru	16,565	13.1	
Turnout		201,826	59.88	

2000
Party	Candidate	Votes	%	±%
LDP	Fumio Kyūma	104,538	51.4	
JCP	Manabu Egashira	33,572	16.5	
Liberal League	Masaki Komai	15,648	7.7	

1996
Party	Candidate	Votes	%	±%
LDP	Fumio Kyūma	104,538	51.4	
New Frontier	Kenichiro Hatsumura	84,375	41.5	
JCP	Hideki Shimizu	14,468	7.1	
Turnout		209,469	64.45	
