= Hideko Nishioka =

Japanese politician (born 1964)

- 西岡 秀子
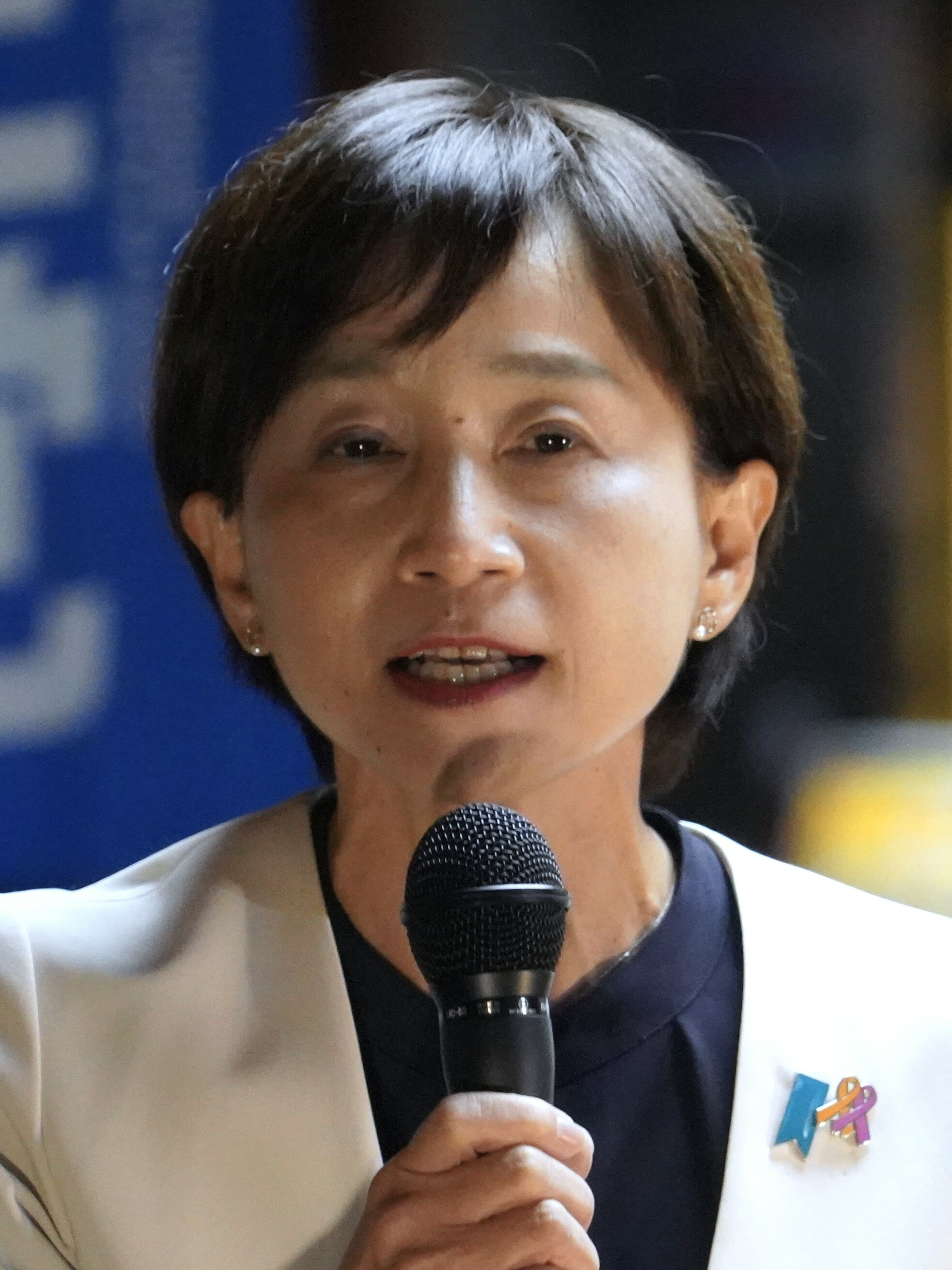
- Nishioka in 2023

Member of the House of Representatives
- Incumbent
- Assumed office 22 October 2017
- Preceded by: Tsutomu Tomioka
- Constituency: Nagasaki 1st

Personal details
- Born: 15 March 1964 (age 62) Nagasaki, Japan
- Party: DPP (since 2018)
- Other political affiliations: KnT (2017–2018)
- Parent: Takeo Nishioka (father)
- Relatives: Takejiro Nishioka (grandfather); Haru Nishioka (grandmother)
- Education: Gakushuin University

Hideko Nishioka (西岡秀子, Nishioka Hideko; born 15 March 1964) is a Japanese politician serving as a member of the House of Representatives since 2017. She is the daughter of Takeo Nishioka and the granddaughter of Takejiro Nishioka.
