= Asako Omi =

Japanese politician

- 尾身 朝子
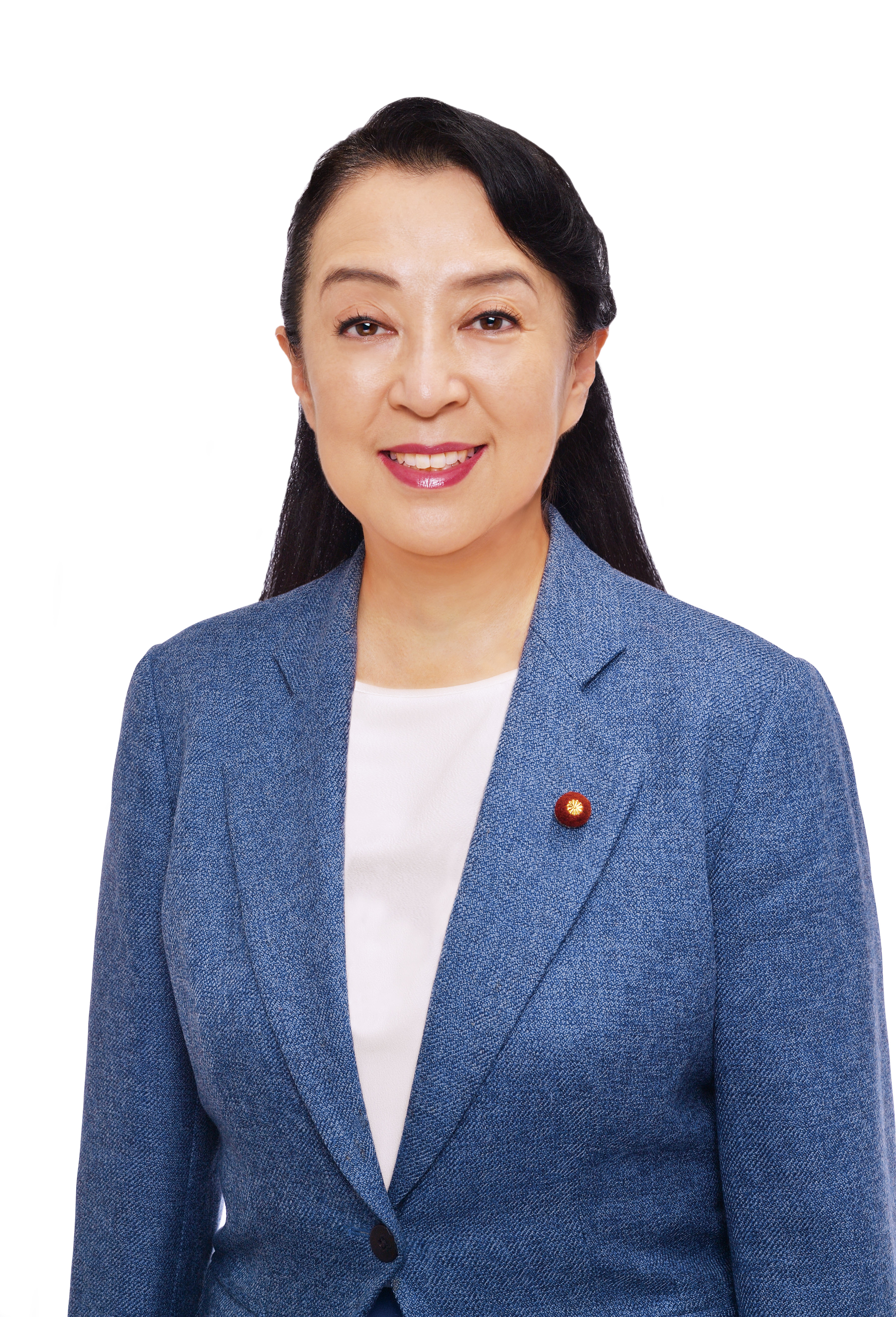
- Official portrait, 2019

Member of the House of Representatives; from Northern Kanto
- Incumbent
- Assumed office 9 February 2026
- Constituency: PR block
- In office 15 December 2014 – 9 October 2024
- Constituency: PR block (2014–2017); Gunma 1st (2017–2021); PR block (2021–2024)

Personal details
- Born: 26 April 1961 (age 65) Chiyoda, Tokyo, Japan
- Party: Liberal Democratic
- Parent: Kōji Omi (father)
- Education: University of Tokyo
- Website: Asako Omi website

Asako Omi (尾身 朝子, Omi Asako; born 26 April 1961) is a Japanese politician of the Liberal Democratic Party, who serves as a member of the House of Representatives.

== Early life ==
On 26 April 1961, Omi was born in Chiyoda, Tokyo. After graduating from the University of Tokyo's Faculty of Law, she entered Nippon Telegraph and Telephone (NTT) in 1986.

In 2002, she left NTT to establish herself as an independent tech consultant.

In 2004, she was appointed as a professor at the Research Institute of Science and Technology, Tokai University.

== Political career ==
In the 2004 House of Councillors election, Omi ran in National PR but could not win a seat.

In 2006, when her father, Kōji Omi, established the Science and Technology in Society (STS) forum, she served as its Chief of Staff and Secretary-General.

In the 2007 House of Councillors election, she ran in National PR but could not win a seat again.

In April 2013, she was appointed as a member of the Council for Child and Child-rearing under the Cabinet Office. In June, she assumed the positions of Standing Director and Chairperson of the Women's Division of the Kojimachi Association. In December, she became a director for both the Labor Committee and the Women's Association of the Tokyo Chamber of Commerce and Industry.

In April 2014, she was appointed as a director of the Special Committee on the Promotion of Women's Active Engagement in the Japan Chamber of Commerce and Industry.

In the 2014 general election, Omi ran in Northern Kanto PR and won a seat.

Looking toward the next general election, Omi explored a candidacy in Gunma 1st district, where her father Kōji had previously been active. In April 2016, the LDP's Gunma 1st district branch decided to withdraw their support for the incumbent, Genichiro Sata, due to a scandal involving his relationships with women. Consequently, the LDP Gunma Prefectural Federation (LDP Gunma) proposed her and Yasutaka Nakasone (grandson of former PM Yasuhiro Nakasone) as alternative candidates. Finally, the LDP Gunma decided to endorse her to the Gunma 1st candidate.

Following the dissolution of the House of Representatives in 2017, the LDP headquarters officially nominated her as a candidate. However, Nakasone and the incumbent Sata — who lacked support from the local lawmakers — also showed strong interest in running. Ultimately, Sata abandoned his bid, and the situation was resolved with Nakasone being placed on the party list for the Northern Kanto PR block. In the 2017 general election, she gained the Gunma 1st seat. Meanwhile, Nakasone won a seat in the PR block.

In September 2019, she was appointed to the Parliamentary Vice-Minister for Foreign Affairs in the Fourth Abe second reshuffled cabinet.

As the House of Representatives' term approached its end in 2021, a new conflict erupted between Omi and Nakasone over the LDP's nomination for the Gunma 1st. In June, Omi held a rally inviting former PM Shinzo Abe, who belonged to the same faction, Seiwa Seisaku Kenkyūkai, then known as Hosoda faction. Abe stated, "I believe it is unthinkable that Ms. Omi would not be the nominated candidate." In response, Omi remarked, "It is deeply encouraging to feel that I have received the support as the LDP candidate." Meanwhile, on 17 July, Nakasone also held a rally, inviting Toshihiro Nikai, the LDP Secretary-General and head of his belonged Shisuikai faction. At the event, Nikai praised Nakasone as "a standout among young politicians with a highly promising future," adding, "I ask everyone to lend your strength to Yasutaka Nakasone. I have great expectations for his future and will provide firm backup from Tokyo."

As the new LDP President Fumio Kishida appointed Akira Amari as Secretary-General, Nikai stepped down from the position, which had held the authority to select candidates. On 15 October, LDP headquarters nominated Nakasone as the candidate for the Gunma 1st and decided to place Omi high on the party list for the Northern Kanto PR block.

In the 2021 general election, she won a seat in the PR block.

In August 2022, she was appointed to the State Minister for Internal Affairs and Communications in the Second Kishida first reshuffled cabinet.

On 6 October 2024, the new LDP President Shigeru Ishiba announced a policy regarding the upcoming general election: members involved in the slush fund scandal who failed to report political funds in their income and expenditure reports will not be allowed to run on the PR block's party list, even if they are nominated as candidates for their respective single-seat constituencies. The treatment of Omi, who had been scheduled to run solely for the proportional representation block, became a point of contention. On October 11, Hiroshi Moriyama, the LDP Secretary-General, announced Omi withdrew her candidacy.

On 18 January 2026, the LDP Gunma applied to the LDP headquarters to include Omi on the party list for the Northern Kanto PR block. On 23 January, the LDP headquarters approved her inclusion on the list.

In the 2026 general election, she won a seat in the PR block.

== Scandal ==
=== Slush fund scandal ===
On 1 December 2023, the Asahi Shimbun reported that Seiwa Seisaku Kenkyūkai, known as Abe faction, is suspected of continuing to systematically kick back to lawmakers with the income collected by its members beyond the sales quota.

It was revealed that Omi used a total of 6.23 million yen as slush funds for five years from 2018 to 2022 as a kickback from the faction for quota excess.

On 4 April 2024, LDP held the Party Ethics Committee meeting and decided to issue a reprimand to Omi from the Secretary-General.

On 14 May 2024, the House of Representatives Political Ethics Committee unanimously passed the opposition's petition to attend and explain 44 LDP members who were involved in the slush fund scandal but did not explain themselves to the committee. On 17 May 2024, the House of Councillors Political Ethics Committee unanimously passed a petition for attendance and explanation to 29 members who had not made excuses. All 73 Diet members, including Omi, refused to attend, and the ordinary Diet session was closed on 23 June 2024.
