= Nagasaki 1st district =

Legislative district of Japan

Nagasaki 1st District
- 長崎県第1区
- Parliamentary constituency for the Japanese House of Representatives
- Prefecture: Nagasaki
- Proportional Block: Kyushu
- Electorate: 340,151 (as of 1 September 2023)

Current constituency
- Created: 1994
- Seats: One
- Party: DPFP
- Representative: Hideko Nishioka

Nagasaki 1st district is a constituency of the House of Representatives in the Diet of Japan. It is located in Nagasaki prefecture and covers the city of Nagasaki.

Before the electoral reform of 1994, Nagasaki city was part of the multi-member Nagasaki 1st district where five Representatives had been elected by single non-transferable vote.

The district has been leaning towards the Democratic Party and its predecessors since its creation. Only in a 1998 by-election, Liberal Democrat Masakazu Kuranari, the eldest son of Tadashi Kuranari, longtime former Representative for the multi-member 1st district, could win the seat, but lost it to Democrat Yoshiaki Takaki in the following general election of 2000.

== List of representatives ==
Representative	Party	Dates	Notes
Takeo Nishioka	NFP	1996 – 1998	Resigned for the 1998 Nagasaki gubernatorial election
Masakazu Kuranari	LDP	1998 – 2000	Failed reelection in the Kyūshū PR block
Yoshiaki Takaki	DPJ	2000 – 2012	
Tsutomu Tomioka	LDP	2012 – 2017	
Hideko Nishioka	Kibō	2017 – 2021	
Hideko Nishioka	DPFP	2021 –	Incumbent

== Election results ==
2026
Party	Candidate	Votes	%	±%
DPP	Hideko Nishioka (Incumbent)	93,931	52.5	▼0.04
LDP	Masumi Asada (Won a Seat in The PR Block)	52,794	29.5	▲0.54
Ishin	Hiroshi Yamada	13,363	7.5	▼0.18
Sanseitō	Sōhei Matsuishi	10,426	5.8	▲0.17
JCP	Takahide Uchida	8,559	4.8	▼0.39
Turnout		179,073	55.62	▲4.7

2024
Party	Candidate	Votes	%	±%
DPP	Hideko Nishioka (Incumbent)	87,784	52.54	▼3.56
LDP (endorsed by Komeito)	Hirofumi Shimojo	48,382	28.96	▼9.04
Innovation	Hiroshi Yamada	12,836	7.68	New
Sanseitō	Ryūta Kuroishi	9,401	5.63	New
Communist	Takahide Uchida	8,679	5.19	▼0.71
Majority		39,402	23.58	▲5.48
Registered electors		334,687		
Turnout		167,082	50.92	▼4.33
DPP hold				

2021
Party	Candidate	Votes	%	±%
DPP	Hideko Nishioka (Incumbent)	101,877	56.1	
LDP	Takiichiro Hastumura (Endorsed by Komeito)	69,053	38.0	
JCP	Ayako Yasue	10,754	5.9	
Turnout				

2017
Party	Candidate	Votes	%	±%
Kibō no Tō	Hideko Nishioka (Endorsed by the Democratic Party Nagasaki Prefectural Federation of Branches)	90,569	48.5	
LDP	Tsutomu Tomioka (Incumbent) (Endorsed by Komeito)	80,049	42.9	
JCP	Takashi Makiyama	16,011	8.6	
Turnout				

2014
Party	Candidate	Votes	%	±%
LDP	Tsutomu Tomioka (Incumbent) (Endorsed by Komeito)	76,247	45.6	
Democratic	Yoshiaki Takagi (Incumbent - Kyushu)	74,218	44.4	
JCP	Atsunobu Nakanishi	16,867	10.1	
Turnout				

2012
Party	Candidate	Votes	%	±%
LDP	Tsutomu Tomioka (Incumbent - Kyushu) (Endorsed by Komeito)	92,624	48.2	
Democratic	Yoshiaki Takagi (Incumbent)	82,088	42.7	
JCP	Takashi Makiyama	17,354	9.1	
Turnout				

2009
Party	Candidate	Votes	%	±%
Democratic	Yoshiaki Takagi (Incumbent) (Endorsed by the PNP)	129,044	55.3	
LDP	Tsutomu Tomioka (Incumbent - Kyushu) (Endorsed by Komeito)	87,297	37.4	
JCP	Eiko Fuchise	14,321	6.1	
Happiness Realization	Koichi Eda	2,527	1.1	
Turnout		236,495	67.03	

2005
Party	Candidate	Votes	%	±%
Democratic	Yoshiaki Takaki (Incumbent)	110,518	48.3	
LDP	Tsutomu Tomioka	101,981	44.6	
JCP	Toshihiko Haraguchi	16,341	7.1	
Turnout		232,338	65.13	

2003
Party	Candidate	Votes	%	±%
Democratic	Yoshiaki Takagi (Incumbent)	106,331	50.6	
LDP	Masakazu Kuranari	90,857	43.3	
JCP	Toshihiko Haraguchi	12,797	6.1	
Turnout		213,705	59.69	

2000
Party	Candidate	Votes	%	±%
Democratic	Yoshiaki Takaki (Incumbent - Kyushu)	76,798	33.8	
LDP	Masakazu Kuranari	65,183	28.7	
Liberal	Takeo Nishioka	63,248	27.9	
JCP	Yoshinori Terada	16,714	7.4	
Liberal League	Ryoku Kikumura	5,158	2.3	

1998 by-election
Party	Candidate	Votes	%	±%
LDP	Masakazu Kuranari	68,443	50.8	
Democratic	Izumi Yamazaki	52,438	38.9	
JCP	Yoshinori Terada	13,860	10.3	

1996
Party	Candidate	Votes	%	±%
New Frontier	Takeo Nishioka (Incumbent - Former district)	84,464	41.1	
LDP	Daisuke Miyajima	71,499	34.8	
Democratic	Kenji Taguchi (Incumbent - Former district)	31,371	15.3	
JCP	Yoshinori Terada	18,317	8.9	
Turnout		209,303	58.62	
