= Makoto Hirayama =

Japanese politician (1952–2018)

- 平山 誠

Member of the House of Councillors
- In office 31 August 2009 – 28 July 2013
- Preceded by: Yasuo Tanaka
- Succeeded by: Multi-member district
- Constituency: National PR

Personal details
- Born: 12 May 1952 Sayama, Saitama, Japan
- Died: 27 February 2018 (aged 65)
- Party: NRP (2013–2017)
- Other political affiliations: NPN (2005–2009); Independent (2009–2011); NPD (2011–2012); Green Wind (2012–2013)
- Education: Kawagoe Technical High School

Makoto Hirayama (平山 誠, Hirayama Makoto; 12 May 1952 – 27 February 2018) is a Japanese politician. He served in the House of Councillors in the Diet (national legislature) from 2009 until 2013.

== Political career ==
Hirayama contested the 2007 House of Councillors election as a member of New Party Nippon but failed to win a seat, finishing third in the party's national proportional representation block behind Yasuo Tanaka, the party's only successful candidate, and Yoshifu Arita. In August 2009 Tanaka nominated as a candidate for the Hyogo No.8 District of the House of Representatives in the 2009 general election. Tanaka's nomination meant he automatically forfeited his House of Councillors seat. On 22 August the House committee determined that Arita was his replacement, but he too declined the House of Councillors seat on the basis of wanting to contest the House of Representatives election. On 30 August Hirayama was declared the official replacement to the House of Councillors seat.

Hirayama, who had resigned from the position of secretary-general of the party in May to start his own business, remained eligible because he had not resigned his membership from the party. Under the open list system used to elect members to the proportional representation block, Hirayama inherited the 618,025 ballots cast for Tanaka and Arita as well as the 1.1 million votes cast in the party's name (under the system, a voter can vote for an individual candidate or the party as a whole). Therefore, Hirayama was elected to the House despite personally receiving only 11,475 of the 58.9 million votes cast in the 2007 election, the lowest number for a successful candidate in the history of the House. In the initial voting he placed 115th out of the 159 candidates competing for 48 seats. Of the 48 successful candidates in the original vote, Yoshiki Yamashita of the Japanese Communist Party had the lowest number of votes with 55,911.

Upon entering the Diet Hirayama commenced a dispute with Tanaka, who was successful in the House of Representatives election and became the party's sole member of that House, concerning the distribution of the party's electoral funds. He soon resigned from the New Party Nippon and later joined the New Party Daichi followed by Green Wind. He contested the 2013 House of Councillors election in the Aichi at-large district but was unsuccessful, finishing in 7th place out of 10 candidates and winning 2.1% of the vote (the top three candidates were elected).
