= Tsunekazu =

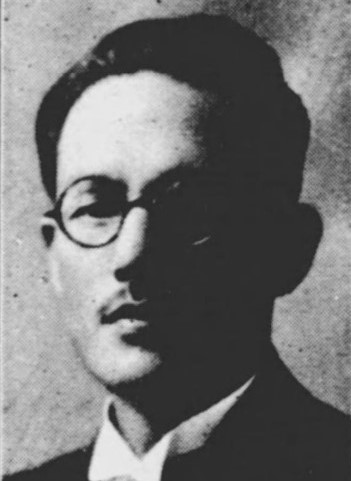
- Tsunekazu Kataoka (1896–1952), Japanese politician
- Pronunciation: tsɯnekadzɯ (IPA)
- Gender: Male

Origin
- Origin: Japanese
- Meaning: Different meanings depending on the kanji used

Other names
- Alternative spelling: Tunekazu (Kunrei-shiki) Tunekazu (Nihon-shiki) Tsunekazu (Hepburn)

Tsunekazu is a masculine Japanese given name.

== Written forms ==
Tsunekazu can be written using different combinations of kanji characters. Here are some examples:

- 常一, "usual, one"
- 常和, "usual, harmony"
- 常多, "usual, many"
- 常数, "usual, number"
- 恒一, "always, one"
- 恒和, "always, harmony"
- 恒多, "always, many"
- 恒数, "always, number"
- 庸一, "common, one"
- 庸和, "common, harmony"
- 庸多, "common, many"
- 庸数, "common, number"
- 毎一, "every, one"
- 毎和, "every, harmony"
- 毎多, "every, many"
- 毎数, "every, number"

The name can also be written in hiragana つねかず or katakana ツネカズ.

== Notable people with the name ==
- Tsunekazu Ishihara (石原 恒和; born 1957), Japanese businessman, president of The Pokémon Company.
- Tsunekazu Nishioka (西岡 常一; 1908–1995), Japanese temple and shrine carpenter.
- Tsunekazu Takeda (竹田 恆和; born 1947), Japanese equestrian.
