= Fukushiro Nukaga =

Japanese politician (born 1944)

- 額賀 福志郎
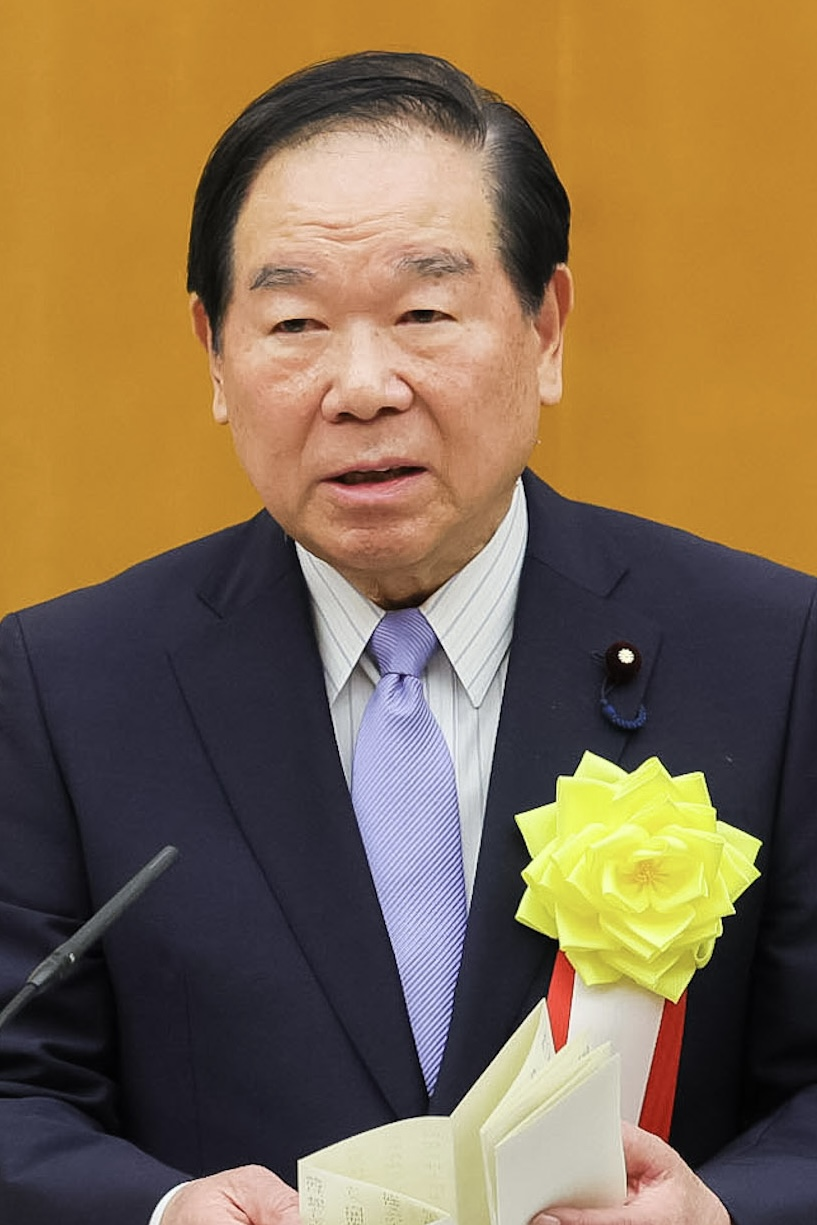
- Nukaga in 2025

Speaker of the House of Representatives
- In office 20 October 2023 – 23 January 2026
- Monarch: Naruhito
- Deputy: Banri Kaieda; Kōichirō Genba
- Preceded by: Hiroyuki Hosoda
- Succeeded by: Eisuke Mori
Government roles
Minister of Finance
In office 27 August 2007 – 2 August 2008
| Prime Minister | Shinzo Abe; Yasuo Fukuda |
| Preceded by | Kōji Omi |
| Succeeded by | Bunmei Ibuki |
Director-General of the Japan Defense Agency
In office 31 October 2005 – 26 September 2006
| Prime Minister | Junichiro Koizumi |
| Preceded by | Yoshinori Ohno |
| Succeeded by | Fumio Kyūma |
In office 30 July 1998 – 20 November 1998
| Prime Minister | Keizō Obuchi |
| Preceded by | Fumio Kyūma |
| Succeeded by | Hosei Norota |
Minister of State for Economic and Fiscal Policy
In office 6 January 2001 – 23 January 2001
| Prime Minister | Yoshirō Mori |
| Preceded by | Himself (as Director-General of the Economic Planning Agency) |
| Succeeded by | Tarō Asō |
Director-General of the Economic Planning Agency
In office 5 December 2000 – 6 January 2001
| Prime Minister | Yoshirō Mori |
| Preceded by | Taichi Sakaiya |
| Succeeded by | Himself (as Minister of State for Economic and Fiscal Policy) |
Deputy Chief Cabinet Secretary (Political affairs, House of Representatives)
In office 5 October 1999 – 4 July 2000
| Prime Minister | Keizō Obuchi; Yoshirō Mori |
| Preceded by | Muneo Suzuki |
| Succeeded by | Shinzo Abe |
Deputy Chief Cabinet Secretary (Political affairs)
In office 11 September 1997 – 30 July 1998
| Prime Minister | Ryutaro Hashimoto |
| Preceded by | Kaoru Yosano |
| Succeeded by | Muneo Suzuki (House of Representatives); Mitsuhiro Uesugi (House of Councillors) |

Member of the House of Representatives; from Northern Kanto
- Incumbent
- Assumed office 18 December 1983
- Preceded by: Akio Kanō
- Constituency: Ibaraki 1st (1983–1996); Ibaraki 2nd (1996–2009); PR block (2009–2012); Ibaraki 2nd (2012–present)

Personal details
- Born: 11 January 1944 (age 82) Asō, Ibaraki, Japan
- Party: Liberal Democratic
- Children: 3
- Education: Waseda University

Fukushiro Nukaga (Japanese: 額賀 福志郎, Hepburn: Nukaga Fukushirō; born 11 January 1944) is a Japanese politician who served as Speaker of the House of Representatives from 2023 to 2026.

A member of the Liberal Democratic Party, he has represented Ibaraki 2nd district in the House of Representatives since 1983. He was previously the Minister of Finance from 2007 to 2008, and served twice as Director-General of the Japan Defense Agency and Deputy Chief Cabinet Secretary.

== Life and career ==
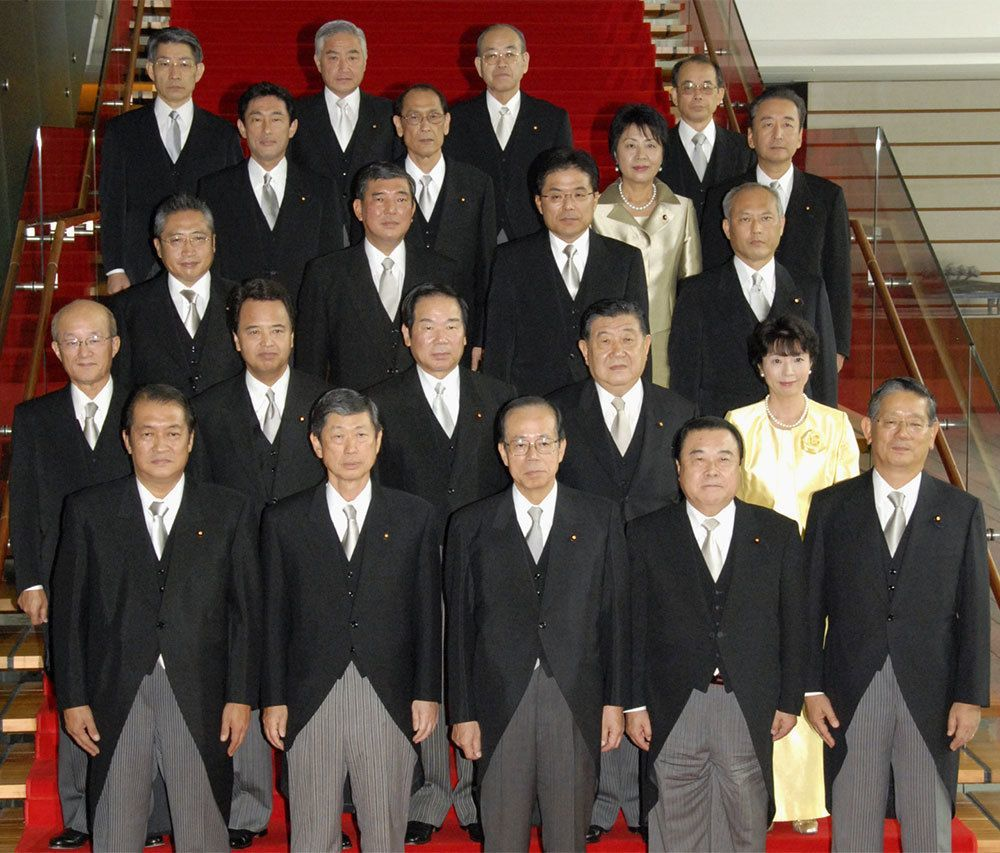
Nukaga with members of the Yasuo Fukuda Cabinet in September 2007

Nukaga was born in Asō, Ibaraki, now part of Namegata, Ibaraki. He graduated from Waseda University's Faculty of Political Science and Economics. After working as a reporter for the Sankei Shimbun, he entered politics and was elected to the House of Representatives for the first time in 1983. He joined the Tanaka faction when elected, but along with most of the faction he later joined the Keiseikai founded by Noboru Takeshita, which was later renamed the Heisei Kenkyūkai.

He was named Minister of State and Director General of the Japan Defense Agency on 30 July 1998, under Prime Minister Keizō Obuchi, serving in that position until November 1998, when he resigned due to a scandal. He was named Minister of State in charge of economic and fiscal policy, as well as IT policy, on 5 December 2000, as part of Prime Minister Yoshirō Mori's second cabinet, but he resigned on 23 January 2001, following criticism regarding 15 million yen he had received from the mutual aid foundation KSD. He said that his secretary had received the money and that it had been returned, but apologized and said that he took "final responsibility as a supervisor". Chief Cabinet Secretary Yasuo Fukuda said that the government believed Nukaga's explanation.

Nukaga served as chairman of the LDP Policy Research Council from September 2003 to September 2004. He returned to the position of Minister of State and Director General of the Japan Defense Agency on 31 October 2005, under Prime Minister Junichiro Koizumi, and remained in that position until September 2006.

He was appointed Minister of Finance by Prime Minister Shinzō Abe in a cabinet reshuffle on 27 August 2007. Following Abe's resignation on 12 September, Nukaga initially said that he would run for the position of LDP president (and thus Prime Minister) on 13 September, but, on 14 September, after meeting with Yasuo Fukuda, Nukaga announced that he would back Fukuda for the leadership. Following Fukuda's victory in the leadership election, Nukuga remained as Finance Minister in Fukuda's Cabinet, sworn in on 26 September 2007. He was replaced in that post by Bunmei Ibuki on 1 August 2008.

Nukaga was reelected in the August 2009 House of Representatives election, which was otherwise disastrous for the LDP. Nukaga was chosen to replace the retiring Yuji Tsushima as head of the Heisei Kenkyūkai. After the LDP returned to government with the 2012 election he became subcommittee chairman of the LDP Tax System Research Commission. In April 2015 he also became chief of the LDP "Headquarters for accelerating reconstruction after the Great East Japan Earthquake".

On 8 February 2018, Nukaga announced his intent to resign from his position as head of Heisei Kenkyūkai. This followed a rebellion in which faction members in House of Councillors led by Hiromi Yoshida threatened to leave the faction unless there was change in leadership. In March he handed over the leadership to Wataru Takeshita, the half-brother of the faction's founder. After that, Nukaga became chief advisor of the faction.

In September 2019 Nukaga left the position of subcommittee chairman and became an advisor of the LDP Tax System Research Commission. He remained an authority in the field of economic policy within the LDP. In December 2021 he was chosen as chief of the new LDP "Headquarters for promoting fiscal consolidation."

In October 2023 Nukaga was elected Speaker of the House of Representatives, after Hiroyuki Hosoda resigned for health reasons.

Nukaga is affiliated with the conservative lobby Nippon Kaigi.

== Election history ==
| Election | Age | District | Political party | Number of votes | election results |
|---|---|---|---|---|---|
| 1983 Japanese general election | 39 | Ibaraki 1st district | Independent | 75,799 | winning |
| 1986 Japanese general election | 42 | Ibaraki 1st district | LDP | 111,933 | winning |
| 1990 Japanese general election | 46 | Ibaraki 1st district | LDP | 106,885 | winning |
| 1993 Japanese general election | 49 | Ibaraki 1st district | LDP | 111,912 | winning |
| 1996 Japanese general election | 52 | Ibaraki 2nd district | LDP | 109,139 | winning |
| 2000 Japanese general election | 56 | Ibaraki 2nd district | LDP | 135,296 | winning |
| 2003 Japanese general election | 59 | Ibaraki 2nd district | LDP | 127,364 | winning |
| 2005 Japanese general election | 61 | Ibaraki 2nd district | LDP | 138,728 | winning |
| 2009 Japanese general election | 65 | Ibaraki 2nd district | LDP | 111,674 | elected by PR |
| 2012 Japanese general election | 68 | Ibaraki 2nd district | LDP | 113,891 | winning |
| 2014 Japanese general election | 70 | Ibaraki 2nd district | LDP | 142,238 | winning |
| 2017 Japanese general election | 73 | Ibaraki 2nd district | LDP | 104,183 | winning |
| 2021 Japanese general election | 77 | Ibaraki 2nd district | LDP | 110,831 | winning |
| 2024 Japanese general election | 80 | Ibaraki 2nd district | LDP | 80,875 | winning |
| 2026 Japanese general election | 82 | Ibaraki 2nd district | LDP | 74,491 | winning |

House of Representatives (Japan)
| Preceded by Multi-member constituency | Representative for Ibaraki 1st District; 1983–1996 | Succeeded by Office abolished |
| Preceded by Office created | Representative for Ibaraki 2nd District; 1996–present | Incumbent |
| Preceded by Fumio Kyūma | Chair, Committee on Financial Affairs of the House of Representatives; 1996–1997 | Succeeded by Seiichiro Murakami |
| New title | Chair, Board of Oversight and Review of Specially Designated Secrets of the House of Representatives; 2015–2018 | Succeeded by Yasukazu Hamada |
| Preceded by Hiroyuki Hosoda | Speaker of the House of Representatives; 2023–2026 | Succeeded by Eisuke Mori |
Political offices
| Preceded by Yosano Kaoru | Deputy Chief Cabinet Secretary; 1997–1998 | Succeeded by Muneo Suzuki, Mitsuhiro Uesugi |
| Preceded by Fumio Kyūma | Head of the Japanese Defense Agency; 1998 | Succeeded by Hosei Norota |
| Preceded by Muneo Suzuki | Deputy Chief Cabinet Secretary; 1999–2000 | Succeeded by Shinzō Abe |
| Preceded by Taichi Sakaiya | Head of the Economic Planning Agency; 2000–2001 | Succeeded by Himself as Minister of State for Economic and Fiscal Policy |
| Preceded by Himself as Head of the Economic Planning Agency | Minister of State for Economic and Fiscal Policy; 2001 | Succeeded by Tarō Asō |
| Preceded by Yoshinori Ohno | Head of the Japanese Defense Agency; 2005–2006 | Succeeded by Fumio Kyūma |
| Preceded by Kōji Omi | Minister of Finance of Japan; 2007–2008 | Succeeded by Bunmei Ibuki |
Party political offices
| Preceded by Masayasu Kitagawa | Director, Youth Division of the Liberal Democratic Party; 1989–1990 | Succeeded by Shōichi Nakagawa |
| Preceded by Tarō Asō | Chair, Policy Research Council of the Liberal Democratic Party; 2003–2004 | Succeeded by Yosano Kaoru |
| Preceded by Yūji Tsushima | Head of Heisei Kenkyūkai; 2009–2018 | Succeeded by Wataru Takeshita |
| Preceded by Hakuo Yanagisawa | Subcommittee Chairman, Tax System Research Commission, Liberal Democratic Party; 2013–2019 | Succeeded by Yoichi Miyazawa |
| Preceded by Tadamori Oshima | Chief, Headquarters for Accelerating Reconstruction after the Great East Japan Earthquake, Liberal Democratic Party; 2015–2023 | Succeeded by Takumi Nemoto |
| New title | Chief, Headquarters for Promoting Fiscal Consolidation, Liberal Democratic Party; 2021–2023 | Succeeded by Yoshihisa Furukawa |
