= Yoshiaki Takaki =

Japanese politician

- 高木 義明
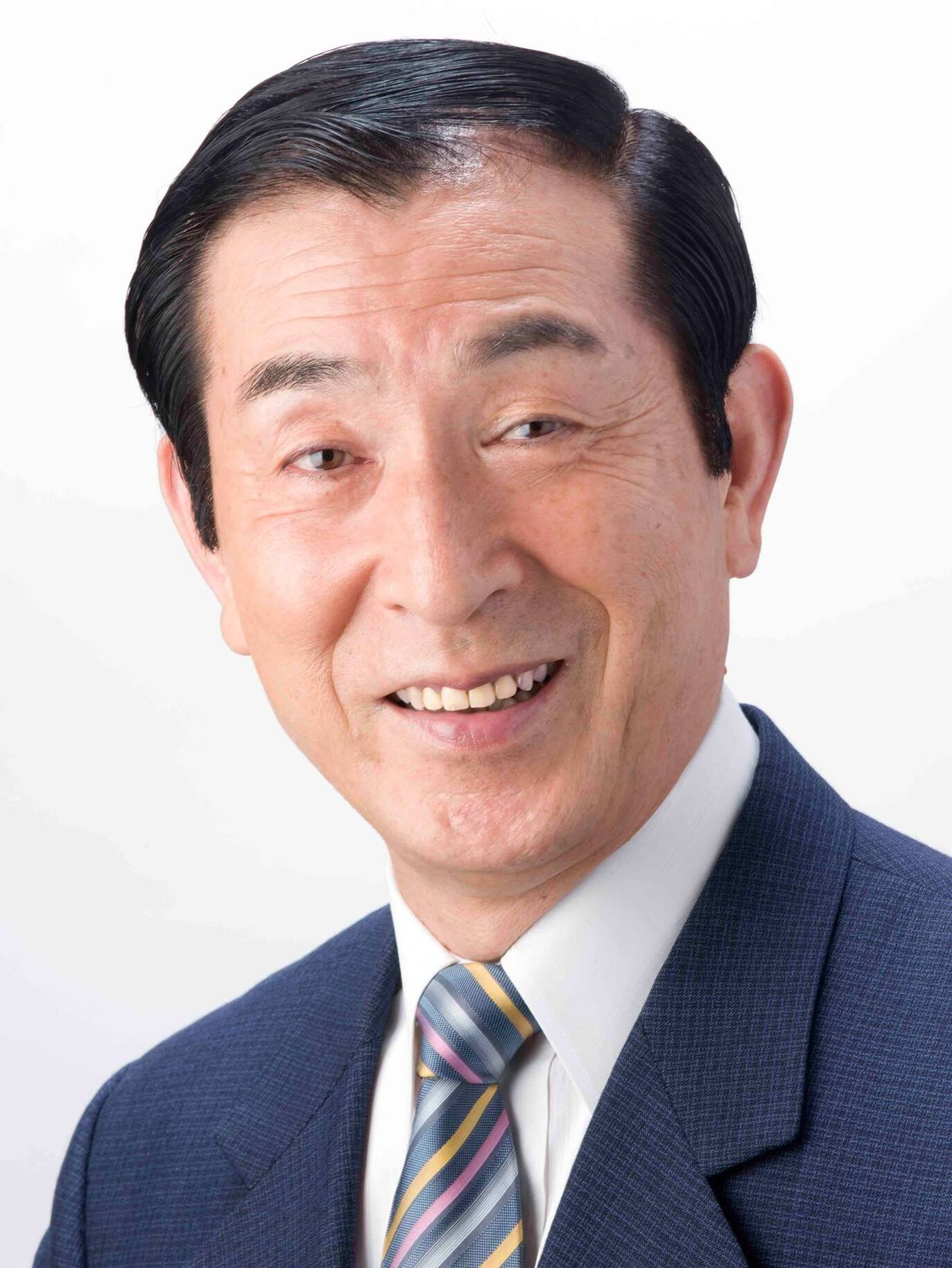
- Official portrait, 2010

Minister of Education, Culture, Sports, Science and Technology
- In office 17 September 2010 – 2 September 2011
- Prime Minister: Naoto Kan
- Preceded by: Tatsuo Kawabata
- Succeeded by: Masaharu Nakagawa

Member of the House of Representatives
- In office 18 February 1990 – 28 September 2017
- Preceded by: Masayoshi Kobuchi
- Succeeded by: Multi-member district
- Constituency: Nagasaki 1st (1990–1996); Kyushu PR (1996–2000); Nagasaki 1st (2000–2012); Kyushu PR (2012–2017)

Member of the Nagasaki Prefectural Assembly
- In office April 1987 – January 1990
- Constituency: Nagasaki City

Member of the Nagasaki City Assembly
- In office April 1975 – April 1987

Personal details
- Born: 22 December 1945 (age 80) Shimonoseki, Yamaguchi, Japan
- Party: DPP
- Other political affiliations: DSP (1975–1994); New Frontier (1994–1998); New Fraternity (1998); DPJ (1998–2016); DP
- Children: 2

Yoshiaki Takaki (高木 義明, Takaki Yoshiaki; born 22 December 1945) is a former Japanese politician who served in the House of Representatives in the Diet (national legislature) as a member of the Democratic Party of Japan. A native of Shimonoseki, Yamaguchi and high-school graduate he was elected to the Diet for the first time in 1990 after serving in the union executive and local assemblies for 15 years.

== Honours ==
- Grand Cordon of the Order of the Rising Sun (2018)

Political offices
Preceded by Tatsuo Kawabata	Minister of Education, Culture, Sports, Science and Technology; 2010–2011	Succeeded by Masaharu Nakagawa
House of Representatives (Japan)
Preceded by Masakazu Kuranari	Representative for Nagasaki 1st district 2000–present	Incumbent
New title Introduction of proportional representation	Representative for the Kyūshū PR block 1996–2000	Succeeded by N/A
Preceded by Takeo Nishioka; Tadashi Kuranari; Kenji Taguchi; Masayoshi Kobuchi; Fumio Kyūma	Representative for Nagasaki 1st district (multi-member); 1990–1996; Served alongside: Takeo Nishioka, Ken'ichirō Hatsumura, Fumio Kyūma, Kenji Taguchi, Tadashi Kuranari	District eliminated
Party political offices
Preceded by Kōzō Watanabe	Diet Affairs Chief of the Democratic Party of Japan; 2006–2007	Succeeded by Kenji Yamaoka
