= Eriko Fukuda =

Japanese politician (born 1980)

- 福田 衣里子
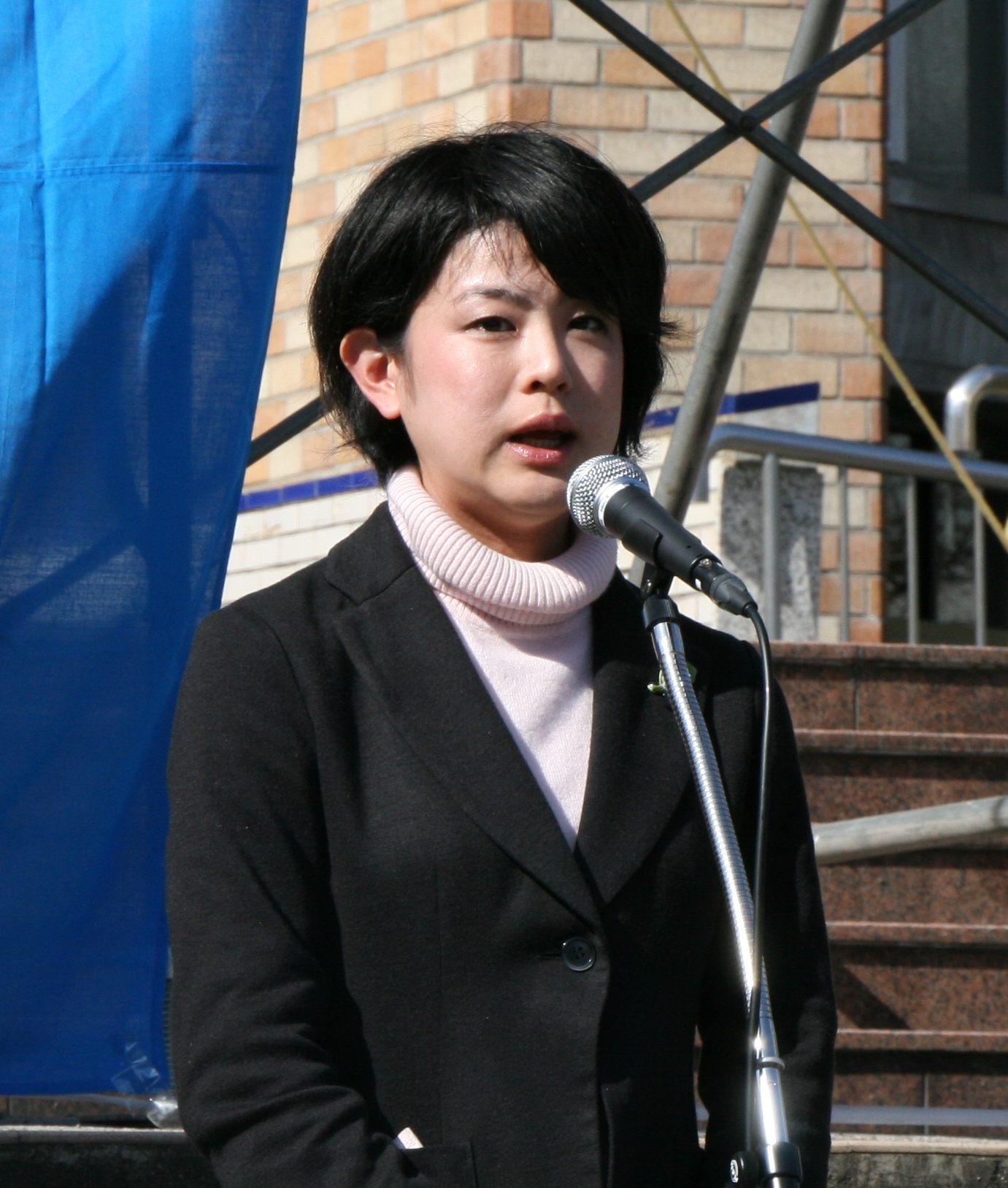
- Fukuda in 2009

Member of the House of Representatives
- In office 31 August 2009 – 16 December 2012
- Preceded by: Fumio Kyūma
- Succeeded by: Kanji Kato
- Constituency: Nagasaki 2nd

Personal details
- Born: 30 October 1980 Nagasaki, Japan
- Party: Independent
- Other political affiliations: DPJ (2008–2012); Green Wind (2012); TPJ (2012–2013)
- Education: Hiroshima Shudo University

Eriko Fukuda (福田衣里子, Fukuda Eriko; born 30 October 1980) is a former Japanese politician who served as a member of the House of Representatives for Nagasaki 2nd district from 31 August 2009 to 16 December 2012. Born in Nagasaki, Fukuda originally attended Hiroshima Shudo University to study psychology, but left after a year to travel Europe. After returning to school in 2001, she discovered that she was infected with Hepatitis C, and dropped out of school to seek treatment.

Fukuda discovered that she was given a blood-clotting agent while still a baby in 1980, which had infected her with the virus along with many others from the 1970s to the early 1990s. In 2004, she became a party to litigation against the government, and became a face of the lawsuit as one of the few people to announce her real name. In 2007, the Diet enacted a law providing compensation to those that were affected. By then, Fukuda had "become a poster child for the battle against all things wrong with the government and bureaucracy."

A year later, Fukuda was handpicked by Democratic Party of Japan (DPJ) party leader Ichirō Ozawa in a party attempt to appeal to voters who were tired of longtime Liberal Democratic Party rule. She won the election against Fumio Kyūma, who had represented Nagasaki in the House of Representatives for 30 years, 50.4% to 44.3%. Shortly before the 2012 elections, Fukuda jumped from the DPJ to the Tomorrow Party of Japan, then to the Green Wind party. After losing her seat in the election, she retired from politics to start a family with her husband, whom she married six months prior.
