= Ryusho Kato =

Japanese politician (born 1980)

- 加藤 竜祥
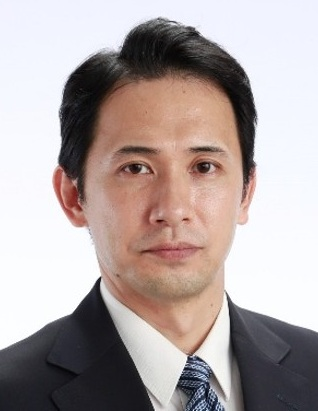
- Official portrait, 2021

Member of the House of Representatives
- Incumbent
- Assumed office 4 November 2021
- Preceded by: Kanji Kato
- Constituency: Nagasaki 2nd

Personal details
- Born: 10 February 1980 (age 46) Shimabara, Nagasaki, Japan
- Party: Liberal Democratic
- Parent: Kanji Kato (father)
- Education: Nihon University

Ryusho Kato (加藤竜祥, Kato Ryusho; born 10 February 1980) is a Japanese politician serving as a member of the House of Representatives since 2021. He is the son of Kanji Kato.
