= Taichi Sakaiya =

Japanese economist, critic and bureaucrat

- 堺屋 太一
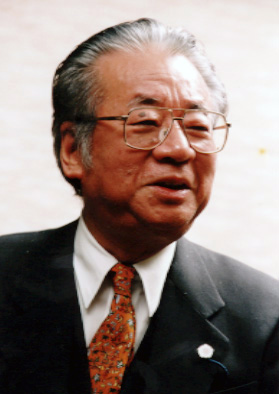
- Official portrait, 1999

Director-General of the Economic Planning Agency
- In office 30 July 1998 – 5 December 2000
- Prime Minister: Keizō Obuchi; Yoshirō Mori
- Preceded by: Kōji Omi
- Succeeded by: Fukushiro Nukaga

Personal details
- Born: Kotaro Ikeguchi; 13 July 1935 Osaka, Japan
- Died: 8 February 2019 (aged 83) Tokyo, Japan
- Education: University of Tokyo

Kotaro Ikeguchi (13 July 1935 – 8 February 2019), known by his pen name Taichi Sakaiya, was a Japanese economist and author.
