= Tsutomu Tomioka =

Japanese doctor and politician

- 冨岡 勉
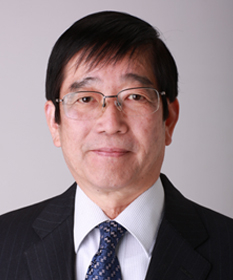
- Official portrait, 2014

Member of the House of Representatives
- In office 16 December 2012 – 14 October 2021
- Preceded by: Yoshiaki Takaki
- Succeeded by: Multi-member district
- Constituency: Nagasaki 1st (2012–2017); Kyushu PR (2017–2021)
- In office 11 September 2005 – 21 July 2009
- Constituency: Kyushu PR

Member of the Nagasaki Prefectural Assembly
- In office 1999–2003
- Constituency: Nagasaki City

Personal details
- Born: 4 July 1948 (age 78) Nakama, Fukuoka, Japan
- Party: Liberal Democratic
- Education: Nagasaki University

Tsutomu Tomioka (冨岡 勉, Tomioka Tsutomu; born 4 July 1948) is a Japanese doctor and former politician who served in the House of Representatives in the Diet (national legislature) as a member of the Liberal Democratic Party.

== Early life ==
A native of Nakama, Fukuoka, Tomioka attended Nagasaki University, earning a doctoral degree in medicine. He also attended The Eppley Institute for Research in Cancer at the University of Nebraska Medical Center in Omaha, Nebraska for two years.

== Political career ==
Tomioka was elected for the first time in 2005 after serving in the local assembly of Nagasaki Prefecture from 1999 to 2003.

== Other positions ==
Tomioka is a member of Médecins Sans Frontières, among other organizations.
