= Fumio Kyūma =

Japanese politician

- 久間 章生
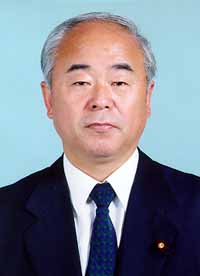
- Official portrait, 1997

Minister of Defense
- In office 9 January 2007 – 3 July 2007
- Prime Minister: Shinzo Abe
- Preceded by: Himself (as Director-General of the Japan Defense Agency)
- Succeeded by: Yuriko Koike

Director-General of the Japan Defense Agency
- In office 26 September 2006 – 8 January 2007
- Prime Minister: Shinzo Abe
- Preceded by: Fukushiro Nukaga
- Succeeded by: Himself (as Minister of Defense)
- In office 7 November 1996 – 30 July 1998
- Prime Minister: Ryutaro Hashimoto
- Preceded by: Hideo Usui
- Succeeded by: Fukushiro Nukaga

Member of the House of Representatives
- In office 22 June 1980 – 21 July 2009
- Preceded by: Yoshinori Taniguchi
- Succeeded by: Eriko Fukuda
- Constituency: Nagasaki 1st (1980–1996); Nagasaki 2nd (1996–2009)

Member of the Nagasaki Prefectural Assembly
- In office April 1971 – June 1980

Personal details
- Born: 4 December 1940 (age 85) Minamishimabara, Nagasaki, Japan
- Party: Liberal Democratic
- Children: 4
- Education: University of Tokyo

Fumio Kyūma (久間 章生, Kyūma Fumio; born 4 December 1940) is a Japanese politician who was a member of the Diet of Japan between 1980 and 2009. Kyuma graduated from the University of Tokyo in 1964 and worked for the Ministry of Agriculture. He was elected to the Nagasaki Prefectural Assembly in 1971 serving three terms before being elected to the Diet as a member of the Liberal Democratic Party (LDP) for Nagasaki Number 2. He served in 2007 as Japan's first Defense minister.

== Defense Minister ==
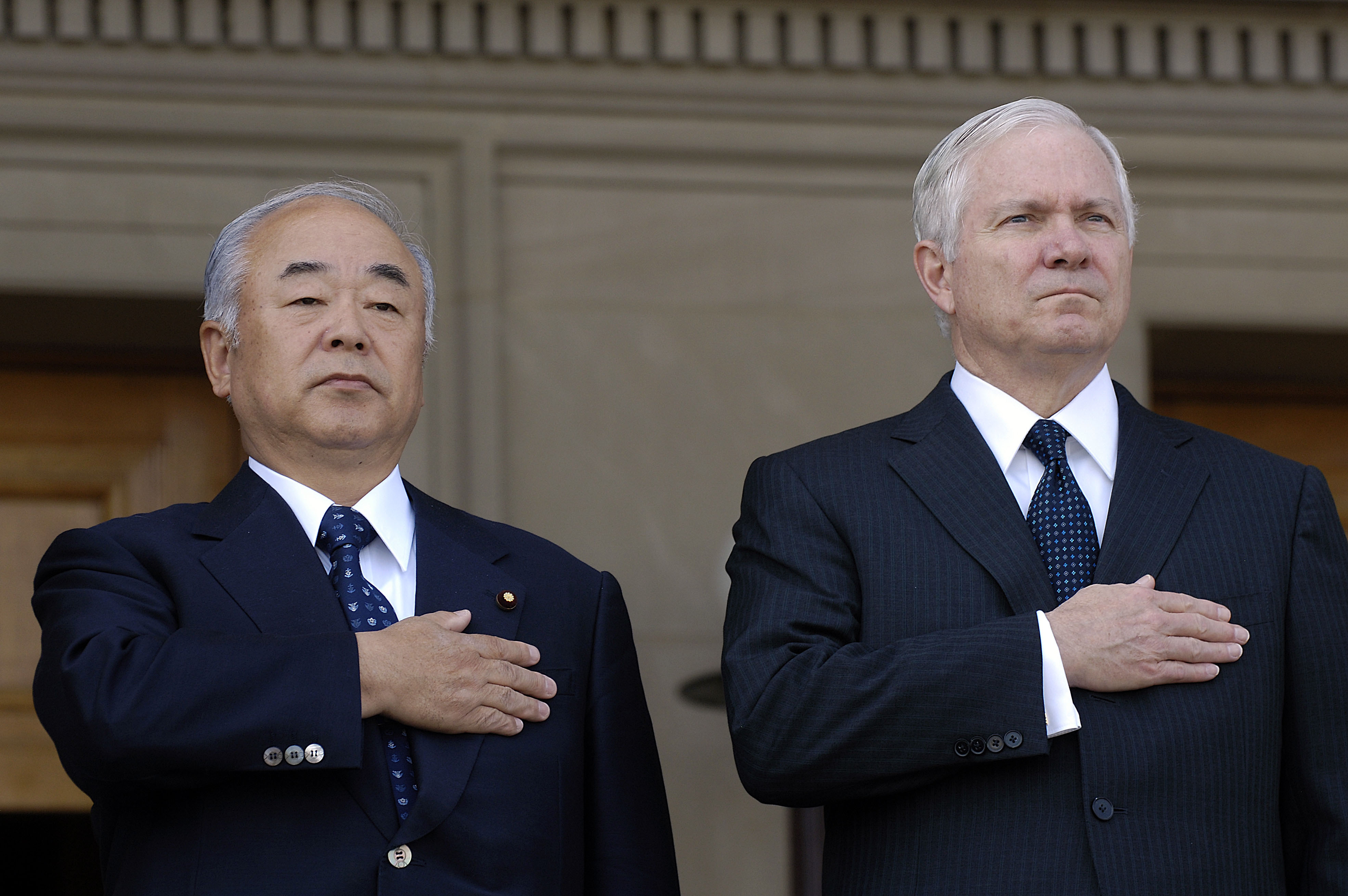
Kyūma with the United States Secretary of Defense Robert Gates at The Pentagon in 2007

Kyūma served as the Director General of the Japan Defense Agency from 1996 to 1998 under then Prime Minister Ryutaro Hashimoto. He served in a variety of LDP posts in Jun'ichirō Koizumi's cabinet. He again became responsible for Director General of the Japan Defense Agency in September 2006. He would be the last head of the JDA before the Ministry of Defense was created for which he was the first holder of the title.

=== Controversial remarks ===
In September 2006, shortly after he was appointed Defense Minister, Kyūma stated that the Chinese military was a concern, contradicting earlier comments that he had made referring to China's military as a threat.

In December 2006, Kyūma claimed that although former Prime Minister Jun'ichirō Koizumi supported the U.S.-led invasion of Iraq, the invasion did not have the official support of the Japanese government. He later had to withdraw his remarks, admitting that the Japanese "Cabinet officially adopted a unified view supporting the U.S.-led war." On 24 January 2007 he said that the U.S. decision to invade Iraq was a mistake.

In January 2007 he criticized the United States over not getting the approval of Okinawa's governor during efforts to relocate the Marine Corps Air Station Futenma. The base and its relocation has been a source of friction between the residents of Okinawa and the U.S. government.

=== Resignation ===
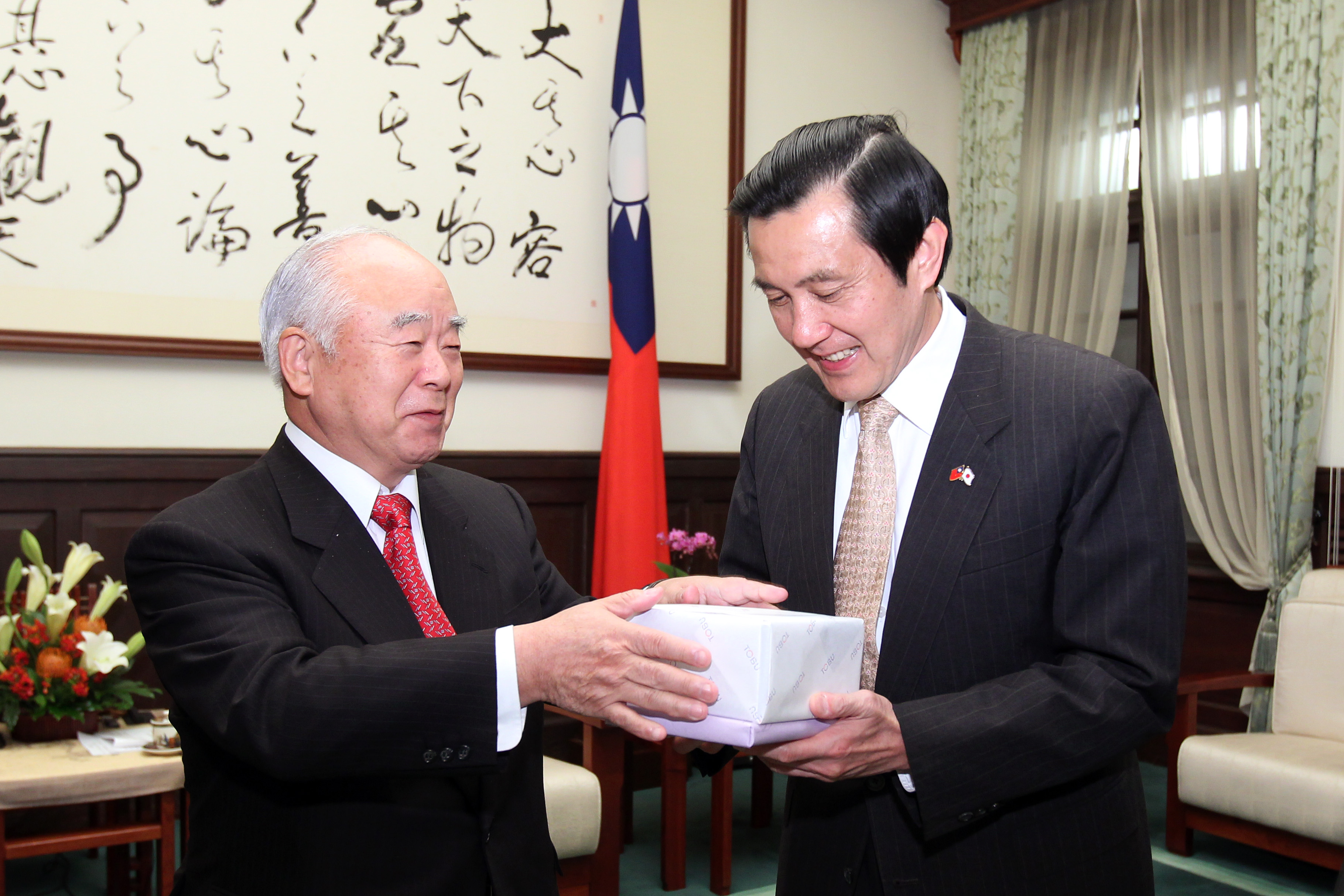
Kyūma with President of Taiwan Ma Ying-jeou in 2011

Kyūma resigned as Defense Minister on 3 July 2007 for remarks made at Reitaku University in Kashiwa, Chiba Prefecture on 30 June. In this speech, he stated "I now have come to accept in my mind that in order to end the war, it could not be helped that an atomic bomb was dropped on Nagasaki and that countless numbers of people suffered great tragedy." He appeared on a Fuji TV morning news show on 1 July, saying he did not think an apology would be necessary, but he apologized later the same day. When this would not calm the critics, Kyūma finally submitted his resignation on 3 July. Asked about the reason for his resignation, Kyūma is quoted as saying that he did not want his comments to become a "minus" for the Prime Minister. Yuriko Koike was appointed his successor the same day.

== Honours ==
From the Japanese Wikipedia

- Grand Cordon of the Order of the Rising Sun (29 April 2013)

Political offices
Preceded by Hideo Usui	Minister of State, Head of the Japan Defense Agency; 1996–1998	Succeeded by Fukushirō Nukaga
Preceded by Fukushirō Nukaga	Minister of State, Head of the Japan Defense Agency; 2006–2007	Succeeded by Himself as Minister of Defense
Preceded by Himself as Minister of State, Head of the Japan Defense Agency	Minister of Defense; 2007	Succeeded by Yuriko Koike
House of Representatives (Japan)
New district	Representative for Nagasaki 2nd district 1996–2009	Succeeded by Eriko Fukuda
Preceded by Tadashi Kuranari; Shigemitsu Nakamura; Takeo Nishioka; Yoshinori Taniguchi; Masayoshi Kobuchi	Representative for Nagasaki 1st district (multi-member); 1980–1996; Served alongside: Takeo Nishioka, Tadashi Kuranari, Yoshiaki Takaki, ...	District eliminated
Preceded by Yoshiyuki Kamei	Chair, Transportation Committee of the House of Representatives of Japan; 1991–1993	Succeeded by Hajime Morita
Preceded by Kōji Omi	Chair, Financial Affairs Committee of the House of Representatives of Japan; 1995–1996	Succeeded by Fukushiro Nukaga
Party political offices
Preceded by Mitsuo Horiuchi	Chairman of the LDP General Affairs Committee; 2004–2006	Succeeded by Yūya Niwa
