= Genichiro Sata =

Japanese politician

- 佐田 玄一郎
- Official portrait, 2001

Member of the House of Representatives; from Northern Kanto
- In office 19 February 1990 – 28 September 2017
- Preceded by: Tsugio Kumagawa
- Succeeded by: Asako Omi
- Constituency: See list: Gunma 1st (1990–1996); PR block (1996–2000); Gunma 1st (2000–2003); PR block (2003–2005); Gunma 1st (2005–2009); PR block (2009–2012); Gunma 1st (2012–2017)

Personal details
- Born: 22 December 1952 (age 73) Maebashi, Gunma, Japan
- Party: Liberal Democratic
- Relatives: Ichirō Sata (grandfather)
- Education: Hokkaido University

Genichiro Sata (佐田 玄一郎, Sata Gen'ichirō; born 22 December 1952 in Maebashi, Gunma) is a former Japanese politician who served in the House of Representatives as a member of the Liberal Democratic Party.

== Political career ==
He was first elected to the House of Representatives in 1990 representing the former Gunma 1st constituency. From 1996 to 2000, 2003 to 2005, and 2009 to 2012 he was elected to the Northern Kanto Proportional Representation seat. And from 2000 to 2003, 2005 to 2009, and 2012 to 2017 he was elected by the first district of the Japanese prefecture of Gunma.

In 2005, he was the Chief Deputy Secretary General of the Liberal Democratic Party.

He has also been the Chairman of the Committee on Rules and Administration.

== Scandal ==
According to Kyodo News International, in 1999 he received JPY8 million in political donations from the construction company of his father by channeling the money through political organizations. Individual politicians in Japan are banned from receiving more than 500,000 a year until 1999, after which all corporate donations were banned, but there was no such ban on donations by political organizations.

On 27 December 2006 he resigned as a result of this scandal from his position as state minister in charge of administrative reform, only 3 months after being appointed by Prime Minister Shinzo Abe.
