= Kōji Omi =

Japanese politician (1932–2022)

Koji Omi
- 尾身 幸次
- Official portrait, 2001

Minister of Finance
- In office 26 September 2006 – 27 August 2007
- Prime Minister: Shinzo Abe
- Preceded by: Sadakazu Tanigaki
- Succeeded by: Fukushiro Nukaga

Director-General of the Economic Planning Agency
- In office 11 September 1997 – 30 July 1998
- Prime Minister: Ryutaro Hashimoto
- Preceded by: Taro Aso
- Succeeded by: Taichi Sakaiya

Member of the House of Representatives; from Northern Kanto
- In office 19 December 1983 – 21 July 2009
- Preceded by: Enji Kubota
- Succeeded by: Multi-member district
- Constituency: See list: Former Gunma 1st (1983–1996); Gunma 1st (1996–2000); PR block (2000–2003); Gunma 1st (2003–2005); PR block (2005–2009)

Personal details
- Born: 14 December 1932 Numata, Gunma, Japan
- Died: 14 April 2022 (aged 89) Tokyo, Japan
- Party: Liberal Democratic
- Children: Asako Omi
- Education: Hitotsubashi University

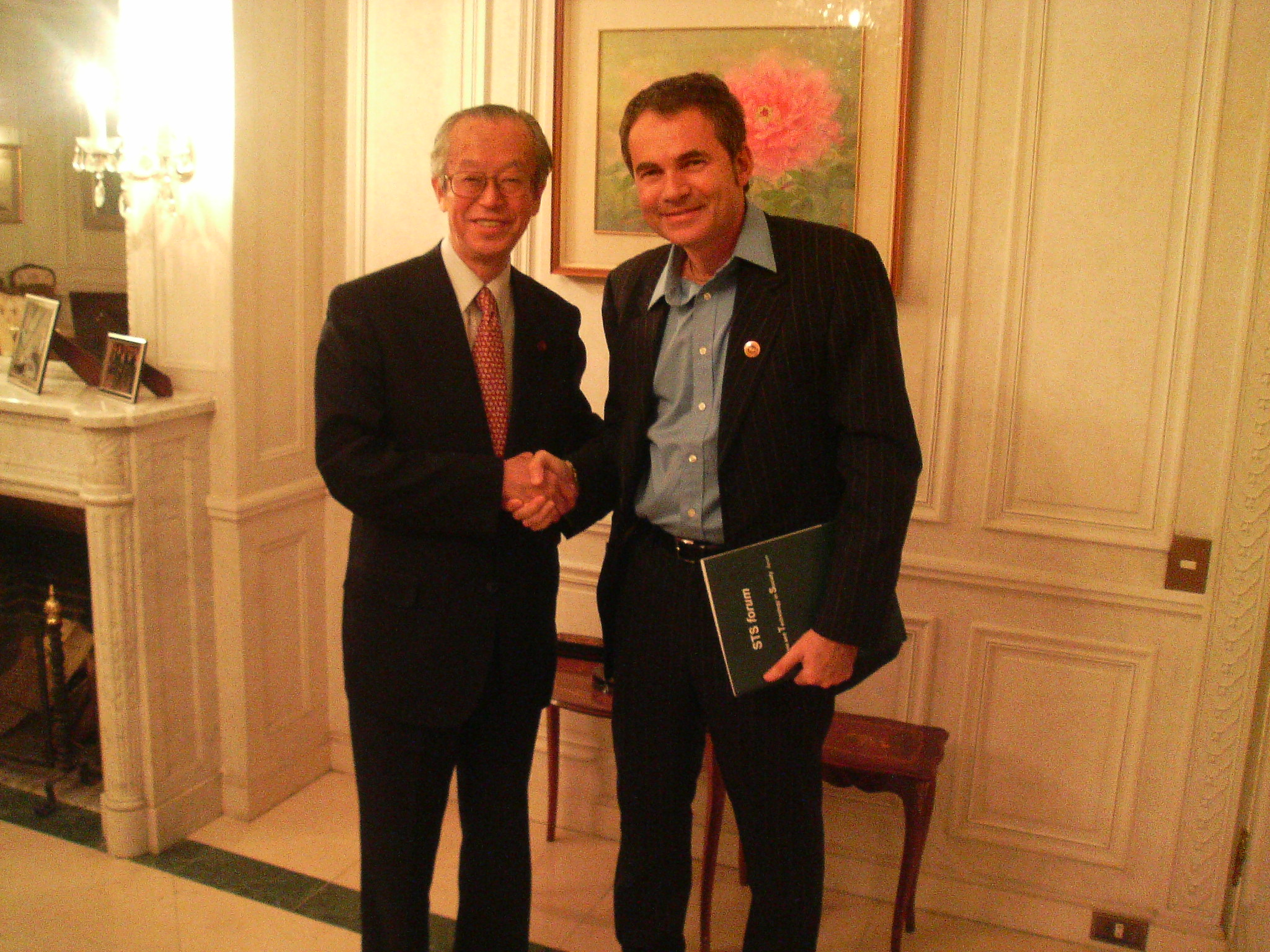
Omi with Martín Varsavsky at STS in Kyoto

Kōji Omi (尾身 幸次, Omi Kōji; 14 December 1932 – 14 April 2022) was a Japanese politician most notable for serving as Minister of Finance in the first Cabinet of Prime Minister Shinzo Abe.

== Personal life ==
Kōji Omi was born in Numata, Gunma Prefecture on 14 December 1932. He attended Hitotsubashi University, where he graduated with a degree in Commerce.

He died on 14 April 2022, at the age of 89.

== Political career ==
Omi started his career in the Ministry of International Trade and Industry where he later served as consul general of Japan in New York City and as the Director of the Small Business Administration. He was elected to the House of Representatives of the National Diet in 1983.

In 1997, Omi was appointed as the Director of the Economic Planning Agency. He briefly acted as a Minister of State for Science and Technology Policy and Minister of State for Okinawa and Northern Territories Affairs under Prime Minister Junichiro Koizumi between 2001 and 2002. He was on a diplomatic mission to the United States during the 11 September 2001 attacks. Between 2006 and 2007, he served as the Minister of Finance under Shinzō Abe. Omi supported increases in the national consumption tax, although Abe distanced himself from this policy and sought to achieve much of his budget balancing through spending cuts.

He was conferred an Honorary Doctorate in Public Service by the University of Cambodia in 2007 and was awarded the first honorary doctorate by the Okinawa Institute of Science and Technology in 2018.

== Other work ==
- Founder and Chairman, Science and Technology in Society Forum, 2004.
- Board member, Okinawa Institute of Science and Technology, 2014 to 2021.

Political offices
Preceded by Tarō Asō	Head of the Economic Planning Agency; 1997–1998	Succeeded by Taichi Sakaiya
Preceded by Takashi Sasagawa	Minister of State for Science and Technology Policy; 2001–2002	Succeeded by Hiroyuki Hosoda
Preceded by Ryutaro Hashimoto	Minister of State for Okinawa and Northern Territories Affairs; 2001–2002	Succeeded by Hiroyuki Hosoda
Preceded by Sadakazu Tanigaki	Minister of Finance; 2006–2007	Succeeded by Fukushiro Nukaga
House of Representatives (Japan)
Preceded by Shosuke Miyachi	Chair, Financial Affairs Committee of the House of Representatives of Japan; 1995	Succeeded by Fumio Kyūma
