= Gunma 1st district =

Constituency in Japanese parlement

Gunma 1st District
- 群馬県第1区
- Parliamentary constituency for the Japanese House of Representatives
- Prefecture: Gunma
- Proportional Block: Northern Kanto
- Electorate: 345,119 (as of 1 September 2022)

Current constituency
- Created: 1994
- Seats: One
- Party: LDP
- Representative: Yasutaka Nakasone
- Municipalities: Maebashi, Numata, Tone District

Gunma 1st District (群馬県第1区, Gunma-ken dai-ichi-ku) is a single-member constituency of the Japanese House of Representatives, the lower house of the National Diet. It is located in Gunma Prefecture and consists of the cities of Maebashi and Numata and the district of Tone as well as parts of the cities of Kiryū, Shibukawa and Midori. As of 2012, 387,120 eligible voters were registered in the district.

Until 2009, Gunma had been a traditional "conservative kingdom" (hoshu-ōkoku), the Japanese equivalent of a "red state" in the United States. Like all single member districts in Gunma, the 1st district had been represented by the Liberal Democratic Party (LDP) since 1997. The LDP used the Costa Rica method (kosutarika-hōshiki) with Koji Omi and Genichiro Sata as alternating candidates for the district. In the election of 2009, Omi was the LDP's candidate; incumbent Sata only ran in the Northern Kantō proportional representation block. Both Omi and Sata had represented the pre-reform three-member 1st district of Gunma. The Democratic Party's candidate in 2009 was Takeshi Miyazaki, a former journalist for the Jōmō Shimbun. In 2012, Sata regained the district for the LDP. In 2013, the weekly magazine Shukan Shincho accused Sata of inappropriate sexual conduct. In the 2014 elections, Sata lost considerable support and did not receive endorsement from Komeito, but still managed to hold onto his seat.

Between 2017 and 2021, the representative was Asako Omi, the daughter of previous representative Kōji Omi. In 2021, the district was won by Yasutaka Nakasone, son of former Foreign Minister Hirofumi Nakasone and grandson of Yasuhiro Nakasone, who was Prime Minister from 1982 to 1987.

== Areas covered ==
=== Current district ===
As of 24 January 2023, the areas covered by this district are as follows:

- Maebashi
- Numata
- Tone District

As part of the 2022 redistricting, all cities in Gunma Prefecture were consolidated into single districts, with the exception of Takasaki. As a result of this, the district lost the parts it had gained of the cities of Kiryū, Shibukawa and Midori during the 2013 redistricting

=== Areas 2013–2022 ===
From the first redistricting in 2013, and the second redistricting in 2022, the areas covered by this district were as follows:

- Maebashi
- Kiryū (former villages of Niisato and Kurohone)
- Numata
- Shibukawa (former villages of Akagi and Kitatachibana)
- Midori (former village of Azuma)
- Tone District

As part of the 2013 redistricting, the district gained area in the cities of Kiryū, Shibukawa and Midori. Seta District was merged into the city of Maebashi in 2009, though the area is still covered under the boundaries of Maebashi.

=== Areas from before 2013 ===
From the creation of the district in 1994, until the first redistricting in 2013, the areas covered by this district were as follows:

- Maebashi
- Numata
- Seta District
- Tone District

== Elected representatives ==
Representative	Party	Dates	Notes
Kōji Omi	LDP	1996 – 2000	
Genichirō Sata	LDP	2000 – 2003	
Kōji Omi	LDP	2003 – 2005	
Genichirō Sata	LDP	2005 – 2009	
Takeshi Miyazaki	DPJ	2009 – 2012	
Genichirō Sata	LDP	2012 – 2017	
Asako Omi	LDP	2017 – 2021	
Yasutaka Nakasone	LDP	2021 –	Incumbent

== Election results ==
2026
Party	Candidate	Votes	%	±%
LDP	Yasutaka Nakasone	103,316	61.6	▲9.72
Centrist Reform	Masatake Kawamura	48,324	28.8	▼6.55
JCP	Setsuko Tanahashi	15,962	9.5	▼3.28
Registered electors		334,671		
Turnout		167,602	52.24	▲3.56
LDP hold				

2024
Party	Candidate	Votes	%	±%
LDP	Yasutaka Nakasone	82,455	51.92	▼4.38
CDP	Keiko Shirai	56,031	35.28	
JCP	Setsuko Takehashi	20,330	12.80	▲3.1
Registered electors		338,200		
Turnout			48.98	▼3.99
LDP hold				

2021
Party	Candidate	Votes	%	±%
LDP	Yasutaka Nakasone	110,244	56.3	▲7.5
Ishin	Takeshi Miyazaki	42,529	21.7	New
Independent	Atsuko Saitō	24,072	12.3	
JCP	Setsuko Takehashi	18,917	9.7	▼3.9
Registered electors		378,869		
Turnout			52.97	▲1,71
LDP hold				

2017
Party	Candidate	Votes	%	±%
LDP	Asako Omi	92,641	48.75	▲15.76
Kibō no Tō	Takeshi Miyazaki	71,569	37.66	▲37.66
JCP	Setsuko Takehashi	25,818	13.59	▲2.19
Turnout			51.26	▲0.55

2014
Party	Candidate	Votes	%	±%
LDP	Gen'ichirō Sata	61,927	32.99	▼12.02
Independent	Hiroshi Ueno	54,530	29.05	▲7.79
Democratic	Takeshi Miyazaki (elected in PR block)	49,862	26.56	▲9.89
JCP	Setsuko Tanahashi	21,394	11.40	▲5.15
Turnout			50.71	▼5.35

2012
Party	Candidate	Votes	%	±%
LDP (Kōmeitō)	Gen'ichirō Sata	94,709	45.0	
JRP (YP)	Hiroshi Ueno (elected by PR)	46,835	22.3	
DPJ	Takeshi Miyazaki	35,074	16.7	
TPJ (NPD)	Arata Gotō	20,663	9.8	
JCP	Hideo Ubukata	13,152	6.2	

2009
Party	Candidate	Votes	%	±%
DPJ	Takeshi Miyazaki	122,711		
LDP	Koji Omi	109,846		
JCP	Hiroaki Sakai	15,783		
Independent	Akira Yamada	5,505		
Happiness Realization Party	Akihiko Takizaki	1,795		

2005
Party	Candidate	Votes	%	±%
LDP	Genichiro Sata	136,920		
DPJ	Hitoshi Takahashi	78,544		
JCP	Yoshie Kondō	18,578		
SDP	Tomihisa Tsuchiya	11,233		
Turnout		251,670	64.46	

2003
Party	Candidate	Votes	%	±%
LDP	Koji Omi	130,242		
DPJ	Hitoshi Takahashi	68,960		
JCP	Nobuo Matsuura	16,126		
Turnout		222,686	57.05	

2000
Party	Candidate	Votes	%	±%
LDP	Genichiro Sata	134,247		
DPJ	Tsugio Kumagawa	61,658		
JCP	Fumiko Yamada	31,147		
Turnout			61.57	

1996
Party	Candidate	Votes	%	±%
LDP	Koji Omi	110,103		
NFP	Tsugio Kumagawa	58,025		
DPJ	Hitoshi Takahashi	31,358		
JCP	Kaoru Hasegawa	21,193		
