= Kawagoe Technical High School =

- 埼玉県立川越工業高等学校
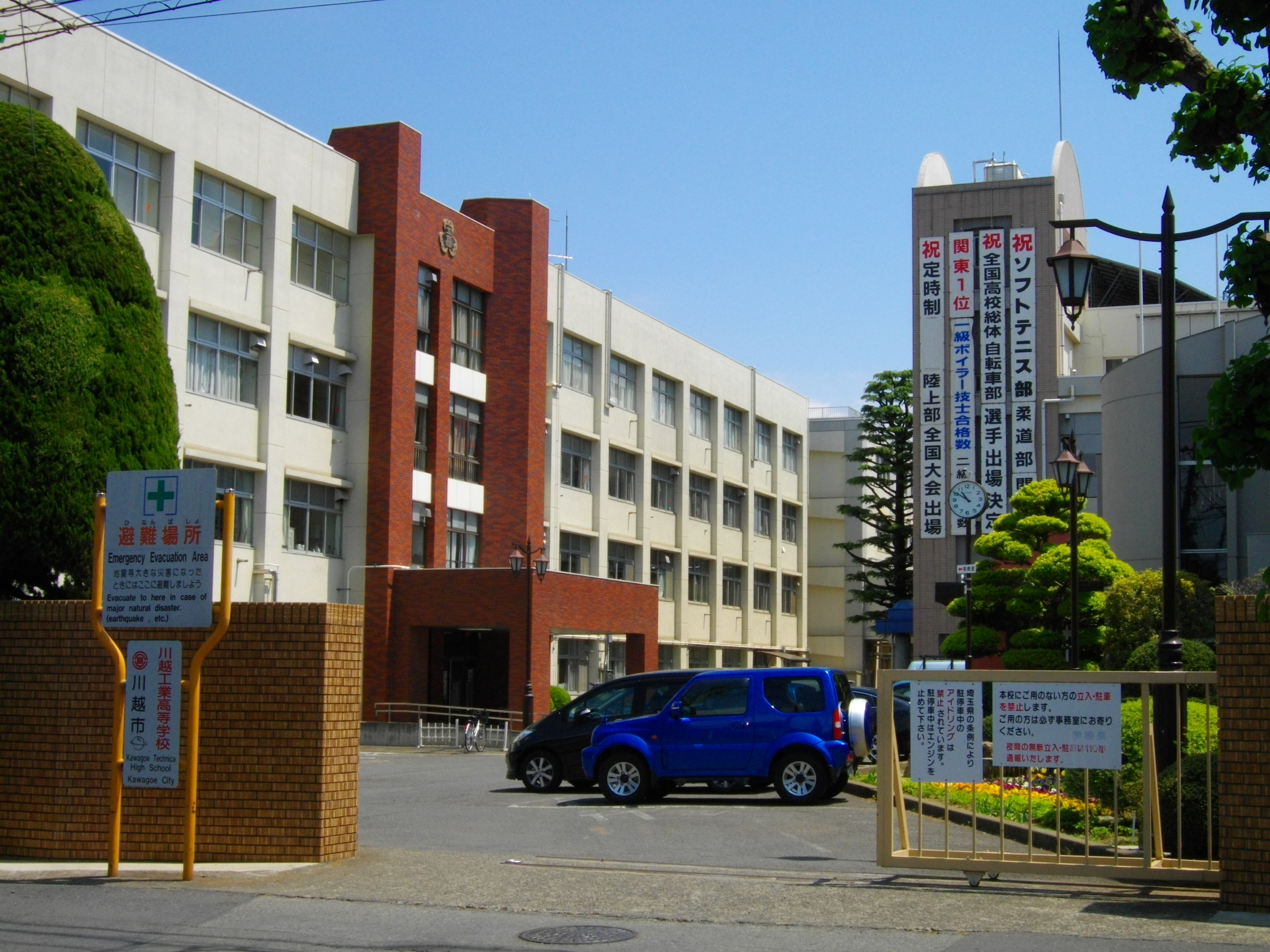

Location
- Kawagoe City, Saitama Prefecture; 350-0035; Japan
- Coordinates: 35°54′47″N 139°29′13″E

Information
- Type: Public
- Motto: Fidelity (誠実, Seijitsu), Diligence (勤勉, Kinben), Ingenuity (創意, Sōi)
- Established: 29 April 1908
- Founder: Saitama prefectural government
- Gender: co-educational
- Website: www.eimei.ed.jp

Kawagoe Technical High School (Japanese: 埼玉県立川越工業高等学校, Hepburn: Saitama-kenritsu Kawagoe Kōgyō Kōtōgakkō; lit. Saitama Prefectural Kawagoe Industrial High School) is a public co-educational senior high school located in Kawagoe City, Saitama Prefecture, Japan. The high school was founded as the Kawagoe Dyeing and Weaving School (埼玉県立川越染織学校, Saitama-kenritsu Kawagoe Senshoku Gakkō) in 1908 by the Saitama prefectural government.

The school is the oldest high school in Saitama Prefecture and has both full-day and part-time courses. Its alumni include the "Father of the Walkman", former President of Sony China Shizuo Takashino. In 2015 students of the school set a Guinness World Record for the "longest distance traveled by a vehicle on a railway track powered by dry cell batteries".

== History ==
Establishment of the Kawagoe Dyeing and Weaving School (埼玉県立川越染織学校, Saitama-kenritsu Kawagoe Senshoku Gakkō) was approved on 7 May 1907 and the initial course was a three-year "upper-primary" (ja:高等小学校, kōtō shōgakkō) for children aged 12 to 15 years old. The school officially opened on 29 April 1908 with capacity for 100 students in its dyeing and weaving course. A design course was subsequently added in 1912.

In April 1918 the school's name was changed to Saitama Prefectural Technical School (埼玉県立工業高等学校, Saitama-kenritsu Kōgyō Gakkō). A two-year preparatory course was established in April 1919 with capacity for 80 students, however it was abolished in 1921. A the same time, the regular courses became five years in length and an elective course was established.

The school's name was changed to Saitama Prefectural Kawagoe Technical School (埼玉県立工業高等学校, Saitama-kenritsu Kōgyō Gakkō) on 1 April 1937. Applied chemistry and architecture courses were added in 1941 and 1942 respectively, increasing the school's total enrolment to 470. The school's current name was adopted in April 1948.

In April 1987 the textile engineering course was renamed as the textile design course and became coeducational. In April 1991 the industrial chemistry, architecture, mechanical and electrical courses also became coeducational.

On 3 November 2015 students from the school, in collaboration with Panasonic, set a Guinness World Record for the "longest distance traveled by a vehicle on a railway track powered by dry cell batteries". A train weighing more than one ton was powered by 600 dry cell batteries and travelled a distance of 22.6 km along the Chokaisanroku Line in Akita Prefecture.

== Notable alumni ==
- Seijuro Arafune – politician and former Minister of Transport
- Makoto Hirayama – politician in the national Diet
- Masahiko Ishida – former professional baseball pitcher for the Chiba Lotte Marines
- Hidenori Kosaka – former professional baseball pitcher for the Yomiuri Giants
- Sakan Morita – former professional baseball pitcher for the Taiyo Whales
- Masahiro Nojima – former baseball infielder who represented Japan at the 1996 Summer Olympics
- Takeshi Sato – former professional baseball pitcher for the Hiroshima Carp and Yakult Swallows
- Akio Shiibashi – developer of the Suica IC card used by the East Japan Railway Company
- Shizuo Takashino – Sony executive known as the "Father of the Walkman
- Keiichi Tanaka – mayor of Warabi, Saitama from 1975 until 2007
