= Yasutaka Nakasone =

Japanese politician (born 1982)

- 中曽根 康隆
- Official portrait, 2026

Member of the House of Representatives; from Northern Kanto
- Incumbent
- Assumed office 27 October 2017
- Preceded by: Multi-member district
- Constituency: PR block (2017–2021); Gunma 1st (2021–present)

Personal details
- Born: 19 January 1982 (age 44) Tokyo, Japan
- Party: Liberal Democratic
- Spouse: Tomomi Sato
- Children: 3
- Parent(s): Hirofumi Nakasone (father); Mariko Nakasone (mother)
- Relatives: Yasuhiro Nakasone (paternal grandfather); Tsutako Nakasone (paternal grandmother); Ichiro Kawanabe (brother-in-law)
- Education: Keio University (BL); Columbia University

Yasutaka Nakasone (Japanese: 中曽根康隆; born 19 January 1982) is a Japanese politician, who served as a member of the House of Representatives since 2017. He also served as a Parliamentary Vice-Minister of Defense under Prime Minister Fumio Kishida from 2021 to 2022. From 2024 to October 2025, he served as director of the LDP Youth Division. From October 2025 to September 2026, he served as Deputy Chairman of the Diet Affairs Committee, Liberal Democratic Party. He serves as State Minister for Foreign Affairs. He is the son of Hirofumi and Mariko Nakasone, and a grandson of Yasuhiro Nakasone.

== Early and personal life ==
Yasutaka Nakasone was born and raised in Tokyo, on 19 January 1982, to his parents, Hirofumi and Mariko Nakasone. He is the paternal grandson of former Japanese Prime Minister Yasuhiro and Tsutako Nasakone.

Nakasone studied abroad in America for a year during high school. He received his Bachelor of Laws (BL) degree in Keio University, and also studied international politics in the university.

His classmates from Keio elementary school (Keio Yochisha) to Keio University include Sho Sakurai, a member of male idol group, Arashi.

Alongside Shinjiro Koizumi, the son of former Japanese Prime Minister Junichiro Koizumi, Nakasone received his master's degree in political science from Columbia University in New York City. After his graduation, Nakasone started to work at JPMorgan Chase in Tokyo. While working in a firm, Yasutaka gradually had an idea to become a politician for a better future of Japan.

Nakasone played in a golf team at both high school and at university.

Nakasone married Tomomi Sato, the daughter of Morimasa Sato (b. 1959), the chairman and representative director of FP, Co. Shoji, a manufacturer, and seller of simple food containers in Fukuyama, Hiroshima Prefecture, and the representative of FP, Co. Group. The couple have (twin) children and a son, Yasuaki and Satomi (twin was born in 2020 and a son was born in 2025).

Nakasone communicated with Sohei Kamiya, Sanseitō around 2018, but Nakasone had strongly supported a candidate of LDP, defeating a candidate of Sanseitō at 2025 Japanese House of Councillors election.

== Political career ==
After six years' working at JPMorgan Chase, Nakasone quit his job and then became as a private secretary for his father, Hirofumi, who was a member of the House of Councillors. By supporting his father Hirofumi's political activities for four years, he prepared for his future political career in Kanto Region, such as Tokyo and Gunma Prefectures (Nakasone family's home region, and formerly the constituency of his grandfather, Yasuhiro).

Although other Japanese hereditary politicians usually take over their parents constituencies without difficulties, Yasutaka had to fight to become a politician. At first, while Nakasone was working at JPMorgan Chase, his father opposed his political career plan, blocking him, as he thought a politicians life was too difficult. However, Nakasone continued to try to persuade his father and, finally, his resignation from the firm led his father to agree to the idea of hiring him a private secretary, and supporting his plans.

=== Liberal Democratic Party career ===
Nakasone was first elected to the House of Representatives in the 2017 general election, on the Northern Kanto proportional representation block list for the Liberal Democratic Party. Before the general election in 2017, he had submitted his application to the Gunma Office of Liberal Democratic Party to become a candidate of the House of Representatives, representing the Gunma 1st district. However, his request was rejected because another person had already been chosen. Afterwards, he was able to receive a candidate post on the Northern Kanto proportional representation block list for the Liberal Democratic Party in the 2017 Japanese general election.

In 2021, Nakasone won the candidate race for the Liberal Democratic Party, representing the Gunma 1st district, due to the positive results in the opinion poll. He was elected to the House of Representatives in the 2021 general election and reelected in the 2024 general election, representing the Gunma 1st district.

Nakasone was Parliamentary Vice-Minister of Defense under Prime Minister Fumio Kishida from 11 November 2021 to 12 August 2022.

In 2024, Nakasone was involved with an abrupt trouble. As Deputy Youth Bureau Director, he attended at the Kinki(Kansai) Regional Conference of the Liberal Democratic Party Youth Bureau held in November 2023 in Wakayama City, Wakayama Prefecture. After the conference, a social gathering party was held with an extreme performance by women in underwear-like clothing when they performed an erotic dance show.("The Liberal Democratic Party Youth Bureau's Radical Dance Show Issue" (jp)) The public was surprised at the news about the performance at a party of prestigious LDP and severely criticized the organizer of the party, LDP Youth Bureau of Wakayama. Both Youth Bureau Director Takashi Fujiwara and Deputy Youth Bureau Director Yasutaka Nakasone, the two were also criticized for their attendance at the party, and they resigned from the Director and the Deputy Director.

From 27 November 2024 to 25 October 2025, he had served as Director of the LDP Youth Division under Prime Minister Shigeru Ishiba.

On 27 October 2025, he was appointed as Deputy Chairman of the Diet Affairs Committee, Liberal Democratic Party under Prime Minister Sanae Takaichi.

In the 2026 Japanese general election, Nakasone commandingly won reelection in the Gunma 1st district winning 103,316 votes against 64,286 combined for two opponents.

Nakasone was appointed as State Minister for Foreign Affairs under Prime Minister Sanae Takaichi from 17 September 2026.

== Political positions ==
As a politician, Yasutaka Nakasone believes that we have to be responsible for the future society by creating a vision and presenting a pathway.

Party political offices
| Preceded by Takako Suzuki | Director of the Youth Division, Liberal Democratic Party; 2024–2025 | Succeeded by Shojiro Hiranuma |
