= Haru Nishioka =

Japanese businessman and politician

- 西岡 ハル

Member of the House of Councillors
- In office 3 May 1953 – 2 May 1959
- Constituency: National district

Personal details
- Born: 21 December 1905 Nagasaki, Japan
- Died: 30 November 1983 (aged 77)
- Party: Liberal Democratic
- Other political affiliations: Liberal (1953–1955)
- Spouse: Takejiro Nishioka (m. 1924; died 1958)
- Children: 4 (incl. Takeo, Kimio)
- Relatives: Hideko Nishioka (granddaughter)

Haru Nishioka (西岡ハル, Nishioka Haru; 21 December 1905 – 30 November 1983) was a Japanese businesswoman and politician who was a member of the House of Councillors.

== Early life ==
Haru Nishioka was born on 21 December 1905 with the surname Ōgushi (大串) in the city of Nagasaki, as the fifth daughter of the ten children of Ichi (イチ) and Ōgushi Kinzaburō (大串金三郎), and at the age of two, she was adopted by his aunt and given the surname Nagano (永野) After graduating from Tamaki Women's School in 1923, she spent one year working as a maid in an asset house for social experience.

== Political career ==
In April 1924, she worked at the election office of Takejiro Nishioka, who was later elected to the House of Representatives in the 1924 Japanese general election a month later; the two married in October of the same year. She spent many days supporting her husband's political activities. In March 1945, the family's home in Tokyo was partially destroyed by air raids, and they were evacuated to Unzen, Nagasaki; two months later the home was completely destroyed by air raid.

In 1948, her husband was expelled from public office, and she became the representative director of the Nagasaki Shimbun evening edition, and the managing director of the Nagasaki Min'yū Shimbun. After that, she became president of Nagasaki Min'yū Shimbun, and also served as president of Kyushu Corporation and director of Nagasaki Radio.

In 1950, her husband became Governor of Nagasaki after his ban from political office was lifted, and three years later she was requested by the Liberal Party to run for the national district in the 1953 Japanese House of Councillors election. Although she declined at first, she decided to run at the recommendation of his husband, Tsuruhei Matsuno, and Eisaku Satō.

She was elected to the House of Councillors, where she served in the welfare and construction committees, helped families of war casualties, enacting the Prostitution Prevention Act, developing a simple water supply on remote islands in Nagasaki Prefecture, and reconstructing the city of Nagasaki. She also served as both the Liberal Democratic Party's secretary and House of Councillors Accounting Director.

After her husband's death in January 1958, she decided to retire from the House of Councillors. She assumed the position of the director of the newly-created Nagasaki Shimbun Company was founded, and became its representative director and vice president, before she resigned as director in 1966.

Haru Nishioka died on 30 November 1983.

In 1963, her first-born son Takeo Nishioka was elected to the House of Councillors in the 1963 Japanese general election. Her fourth-son Kimio Nishioka was a member of the Nagasaki Prefectural Assembly. Her granddaughter Hideko Nishioka is a member of the House of Representatives.
