= Takeo Nishioka =

Japanese politician (1936–2011)

- 西岡 武夫
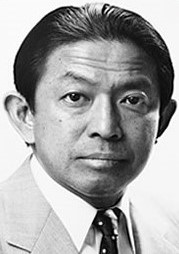
- Official portrait, 1988

President of the House of Councillors
- In office 30 July 2010 – 5 November 2011
- Monarch: Akihito
- Vice President: Hidehisa Otsuji
- Preceded by: Satsuki Eda
- Succeeded by: Kenji Hirata

Minister of Education
- In office 27 December 1988 – 10 August 1989
- Prime Minister: Noboru Takeshita; Sōsuke Uno
- Preceded by: Gentarō Nakajima
- Succeeded by: Kazuya Ishibashi

Member of the House of Councillors
- In office 29 July 2001 – 5 November 2011
- Preceded by: Multi-member district
- Succeeded by: Tomoko Hata
- Constituency: National PR

Member of the House of Representatives
- In office 8 July 1986 – 3 February 1998
- Preceded by: Kakuji Miyazaki
- Succeeded by: Masakazu Kuranari
- Constituency: Former Nagasaki 1st (1986–1996); Nagasaki 1st (1996–1998)
- In office 22 November 1963 – 28 November 1983
- Preceded by: Tsuyoshi Kihara
- Succeeded by: Kakuji Miyazaki
- Constituency: Former Nagasaki 1st

Personal details
- Born: 12 February 1936 Nagasaki, Japan
- Died: 5 November 2011 (aged 75) Minato, Tokyo, Japan
- Party: Democratic (2003–2011)
- Other political affiliations: LDP (1963–1976; 1980–1994); NLC (1976–1979); Independent (1979–1980); NFP (1994–1998); LP (1998–2003)
- Children: Hideko Nishioka
- Parent(s): Takejirō Nishioka; Haru Nishioka
- Relatives: Masakazu Kuranari (nephew); Tadashi Kuranari (cousin)
- Education: Waseda University

Takeo Nishioka (西岡 武夫, Nishioka Takeo; 12 February 1936 – 5 November 2011) was a Japanese politician of the Democratic Party of Japan (DPJ), who served as a member of the House of Representatives and the House of Councillors in the Diet.

== Early life ==
Nishioka was a native of Nagasaki and graduated from Waseda University.

== Political career ==
Nishioka was elected to the House of Representatives for the first time in 1963. He lost his seat in 1983 but was re-elected in 1986. He lost the seat again in 2000 and was elected to the House of Councillors for the first time in 2001.

In 2010, he was elected as the President of the House of Councillors, as a member of the DPJ. He died in office.

== Sources ==
- 政治家情報 〜西岡 武夫〜. www.senkyo.janjan.jp ザ･選挙 (in Japanese). JANJAN. Archived from the original on 2007-12-01.

Political offices
Preceded by Gentarō Nakajima	Minister of Education; 1988–1989	Succeeded by Kazuya Ishibashi
House of Councillors
Preceded by Satsuki Eda	President of the House of Councillors; 2010–2011	Succeeded by TBD
Preceded by N/A	Councillor by proportional representation 2001–2011	Succeeded by Tomoko Hata (scheduled replacement w/o vote by kuriage-tōsen)
House of Representatives (Japan)
New district	Representative for Nagasaki 1st district 1996–1998	Vacant Title next held by Masakazu Kuranari
Preceded by Shigemitsu Nakamura; Kakuji Miyazaki; Masayoshi Kobuchi; Tadashi Kuranari; Fumio Kyūma	Representative for Nagasaki 1st district (multi-member); 1986–1996; Served alongside: Tadashi Kuranari, Yoshiaki Takaki, ...	District eliminated
Preceded by Motoharu Baba; Tadashi Kuranari; Chōjirō Taguchi; Shigemitsu Nakamura; Tsuyoshi Kihara	Representative for Nagasaki 1st district (multi-member); 1963–1983; Served alongside: Tadashi Kuranari, ...	Succeeded by Shigemitsu Nakamura; Kakuji Miyazaki; Masayoshi Kobuchi; Tadashi Kuranari; Fumio Kyūma
Party political offices
Preceded by Takashi Yonezawa	Secretary general of the New Frontier Party; 1996–1997	Party dissolved
New title	Diet affairs chief of the New Frontier Party; 1996	Succeeded by Kansei Nakano
Preceded by Shunjirō Karasawa	Chairman of the LDP General Affairs Committee; 1990–1991	Succeeded by Kōkō Satō
