= Green Wind =

Green Wind みどりの風 Midori no Kaze
- President: Kuniko Tanioka
- Founded: 2012
- Dissolved: 2013
- Split from: Democratic Party of Japan
- Ideology: Environmentalism
- Political position: Center-left
- Colours: Green

Party flag
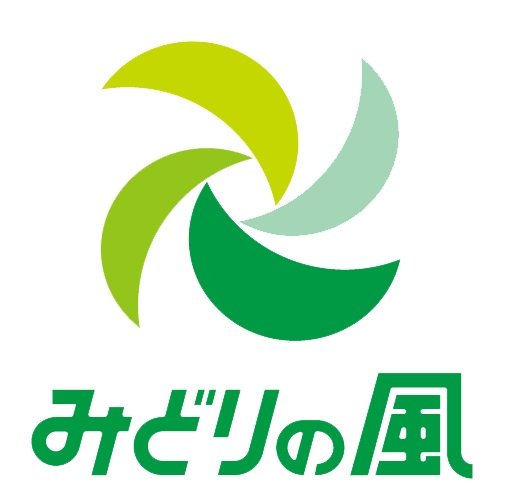

Green Wind was a left-wing political party in Japan. It opposed the Trans-Pacific Partnership and October 2012 Consumption Tax Hike. It was founded as a parliamentary group in July 2012, and as a political party in November 2012 when Representative Makoto Yamazaki left the Democratic Party and joined the group. On November 17, 2012, the party obtained its second member of the lower house, the House of Representatives, when former Democratic Party Representative Eriko Fukuda joined the party. In 2013, Tomoko Abe, the last remaining member of Tomorrow Party of Japan, joined Green Wind. However, on December 31, 2013, the party was dissolved.

== Co-leaders ==
The party's four co-leaders were its four members of the House of Councillors: Kuniko Koda, Yasue Funayama, Akiko Kamei, and Kuniko Tanioka.

== See also ==
- Greens Japan
