= Tadashi Kuranari =

Japanese politician

- 倉成 正
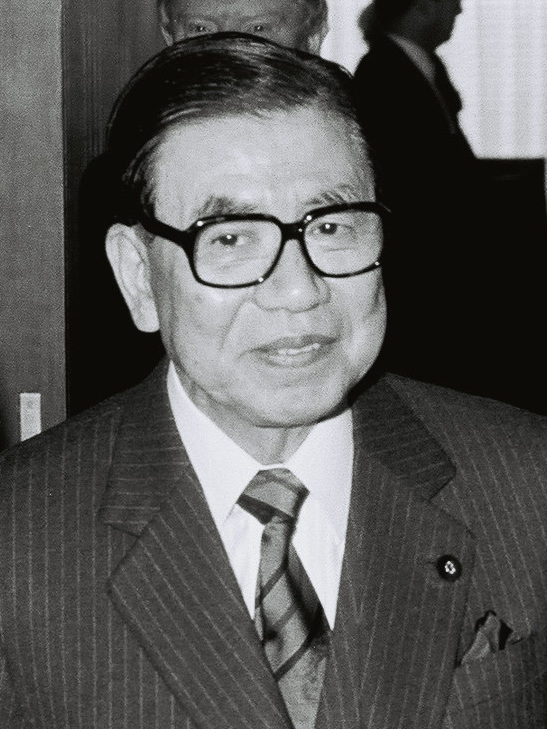
- Kuranari in 1986

Minister for Foreign Affairs
- In office 22 July 1986 – 6 November 1987
- Prime Minister: Yasuhiro Nakasone
- Preceded by: Shintaro Abe
- Succeeded by: Sōsuke Uno

Director-General of the Economic Planning Agency
- In office 24 December 1976 – 28 November 1977
- Prime Minister: Takeo Fukuda
- Preceded by: Uichi Noda
- Succeeded by: Kiichi Miyazawa
- In office 11 November 1974 – 9 December 1974
- Prime Minister: Kakuei Tanaka
- Preceded by: Tsuneo Uchida
- Succeeded by: Takeo Fukuda

Member of the House of Representatives
- In office 23 May 1958 – 18 June 1993
- Preceded by: Tarō Nakashima
- Succeeded by: Ken'ichirō Hatsumura
- Constituency: Nagasaki 1st

Personal details
- Born: 31 August 1918 Nagasaki, Japan
- Died: 3 July 1996 (aged 77)
- Party: Liberal Democratic
- Relatives: Takeo Nishioka (cousin)
- Education: Tokyo Imperial University

Tadashi Kuranari (Japanese: 倉成 正, Hepburn: Kuranari Tadashi; 31 August 1918 – 3 July 1996) was a Japanese politician who was Minister of Foreign Affairs from 1986 to 1987. A member of the Liberal Democratic Party, he was a close confidant of Yasuhiro Nakasone, who appointed him Foreign Minister after his 1986 re-election.

Kuranari had concentrated on agricultural issues and was director of the Economic Planning Agency, a Cabinet post, in the 1970s. In 1987 he visited Sri Lanka, Fiji and other countries.

== Honour ==
=== Foreign honour ===
- Malaysia : Honorary Commander of the Order of the Defender of the Realm (P.M.N.) (1991)

== See also ==
- List of Japanese politicians
- Politics of Japan

House of Representatives (Japan)
Preceded by Tsuyoshi Kihara; Hitoshi Imamura; Motoharu Baba; Tarō Nakajima; Chōjirō Taguchi	Representative for Nagasaki 1st district (multi-member); 1958–1986; Served alongside: Motoharu Baba, Chōjirō Taguchi, Tsuyoshi Kihara, Hitoshi Imamura, Shigemitsu Nakamura, Takeo Nishioka, Nobuhito Matsuo, Takeki Komiya, Yoshinori Taniguchi, Masayoshi Kobuchi, Kakuji Miyazaki, Fumio Kyūma	Succeeded by Takeo Nishioka; Tadashi Kuranari; Kenji Taguchi; Masayoshi Kobuchi; Fumio Kyūma
Preceded by Jujiro Morita	Chair, Committee on Social and Labour Affairs of the House of Representatives; 1970–1971	Succeeded by Kinji Moriyama
Preceded by Chuji Kuno	Chair, Committee on Budget of the House of Representatives; 1983–1984	Succeeded by Kosei Amano
Party political offices
Preceded by Ippei Kaneko	Chair, Research Commission on the Tax System of the Liberal Democratic Party; 1978–1979	Succeeded by Sadanori Yamanaka
Political offices
Preceded by Tsuneo Uchida	Director-General of the Economic Planning Agency; 1974	Succeeded by Takeo Fukuda
Preceded by Uichi Noda	Director-General of the Economic Planning Agency; 1976–1977	Succeeded by Kiichi Miyazawa
Preceded by Shintarō Abe	Minister for Foreign Affairs; 1986–1987	Succeeded by Sōsuke Uno
