= Tsunekazu Nishioka =

Japanese miyadaiku

Portrait of Tsunekazu Nishioka

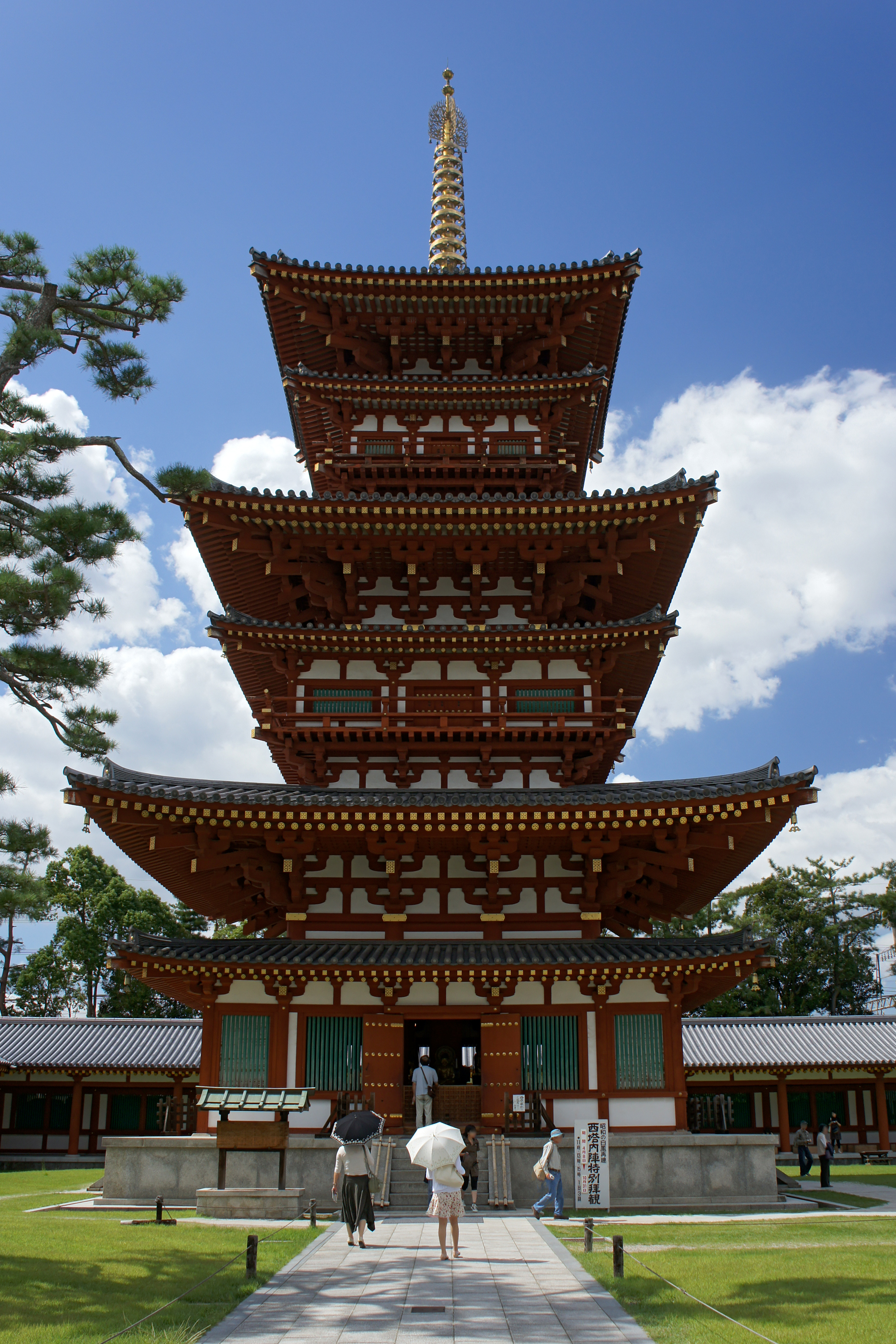
Yakushi-ji, Saitō, West Pagoda

Tsunekazu Nishioka (西岡常一 Nishioka Tsunekazu, 4 September 1908 – 11 April 1995) was a highly respected miyadaiku (宮大工), a temple and shrine carpenter, and the Tōryō (棟梁, master carpenter) of Japanese Buddhist temple and Shinto shrine buildings. He was a stern teacher, and was given the nickname of oni (meaning 'devil'), for the strictness of his words of guidance to colleagues and apprentices. Nishioka continued the ancient practices of construction and restoration used for historical temple buildings, and contributed to preserving the oldest existing wooden structures in the world. He devoted his life to the repair and restoration of the Buddhist temple buildings at Hōryū-ji, and the restoration of Yakushi-ji (both designated UNESCO World Heritage sites), and numerous other temples and pagodas in the region of modern-day Nara Prefecture.

== Biography ==
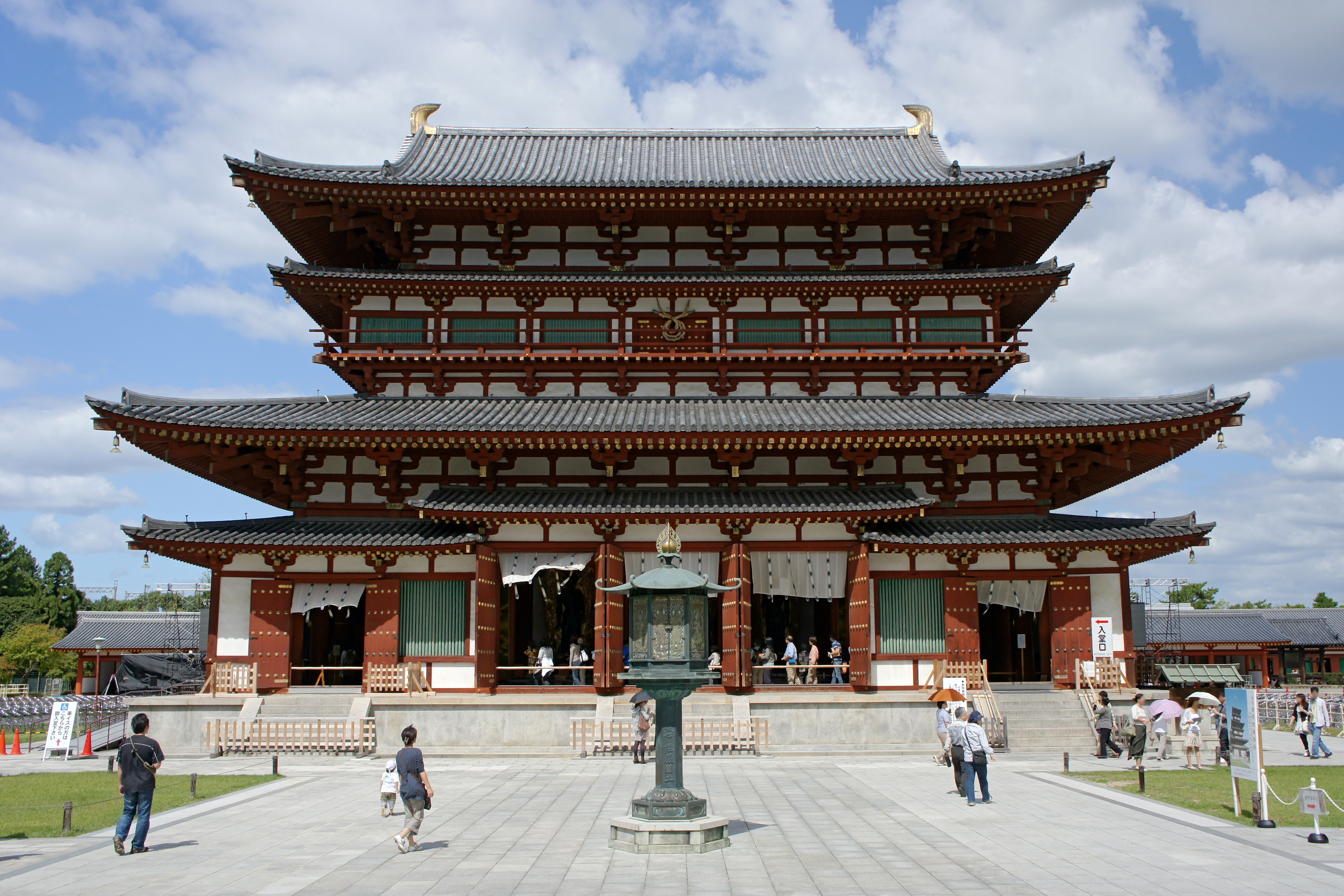
Yakushi-ji, Kondō, Main Hall

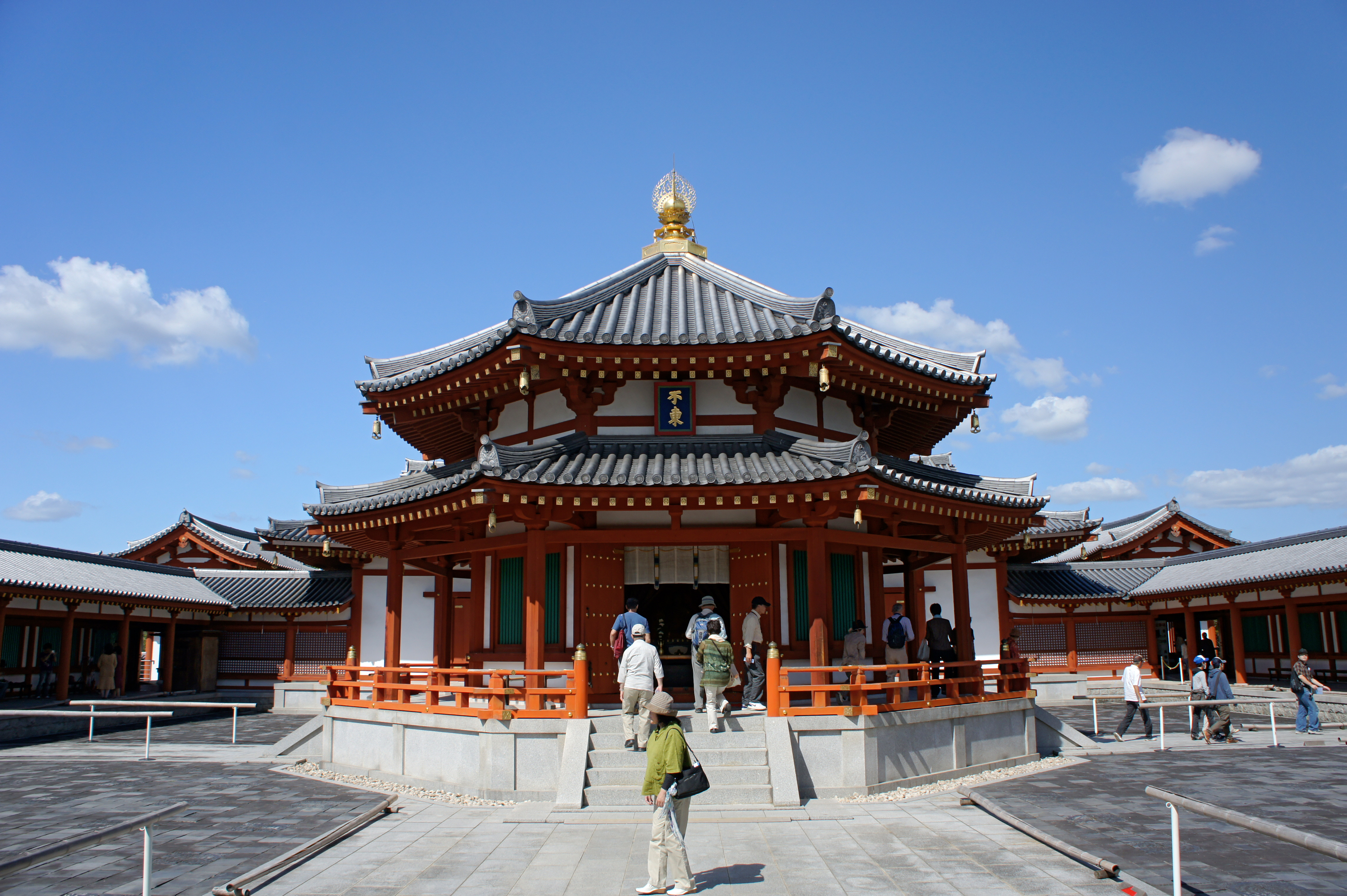
Yakushi-ji, Genjō-sanzō-in, Xuanzang Hall

Tsunekazu Nishioka was born on 4 September 1908, in the vicinity of Nishisato village, adjacent to the Buddhist temple compound of Hōryū-ji, Nara Prefecture. Both his grandfather, Tsunekichi Nishioka and father, Naramitsu Nishioka, were master carpenters (Tōryō, 棟梁) of Hōryū-ji.

In early childhood, he was taken to Hōryū-ji by his grandfather and was cherished by the chief priest, Saeki Jyoin. He fondly recounted that "I vividly remember having Castella cake and eating oranges given to me by Jyoin-san". From an early age, he received excellent guidance in becoming a master carpenter.

He worked at the temple during summer holidays from the 3rd grade of elementary school. "...At that time, the precincts of the temple was the perfect place for the children of Nishisato village to play. They often played baseball on the weekends. However, whenever I saw them playing from where I was working, I thought, 'Why am I the only one to have to work as a carpenter' and felt resentment" he says.

He was enrolled at Ikoma Agricultural School in 1921. His father had planned for him to attend engineering school, but at his grandfather's command, he went to agricultural school instead. When he started school, his grandfather began teaching him to use carpentry tools and woodwork techniques.

After graduating in 1924, he became an apprentice carpenter. Following his years of training, he started his career as an independent carpenter from 1928 and participated in the repair and reconstruction of the temple buildings and compound (garan) at Hōryū-ji. From January 1929 to July 1930, he was enlisted in the heavy artillery regiment of the Japanese Imperial Army, and worked as a combat medic. After being discharged in 1932, he further studied architectural techniques in the repair work on the five-story pagoda at Hōryū-ji. He became the master carpenter (Tōryō 棟梁) of Hōryū-ji in 1934.

As the flames of war expanded, Nishioka himself was caught in the war. In August 1937, he was drafted again as a combat medic.

The reconstruction of the Main Hall (Kondō) of Yakushi-ji was introduced in a television program titled 'Project X' on NHK. The carpenters practiced the revival of traditional tools who use had been increasingly abandoned, including the spear-headed plane (yariganna). Nishioka was given the name of 'The Last Temple Carpenter' for his dedication to pass the temple construction techniques that had been inherited from the Asuka era on to future generations of temple and shrine carpenters. He was honoured as a national cultural treasure, a person of cultural merit, an honorary townsperson of Ikaruga. His brother, Narajirou Nishioka, also supported his father and brother as a miyadaiku. His main apprentice was Mitsuo Ogawa. Nishioka died of cancer at the age of 86 on April 11, 1995.

== Influence of his Grandfather ==
His grandfather, Tsunekichi Nishioka, had been preparing for his successor as the Chief Carpenter of Hōryū-ji. His entire family was delighted when he was blessed with his first born grandson. He included the character「常」(Tsune) from his own name, and named his grandson Tsunekazu「常一」. Tsunekichi often bought his grandson candy, did not scold him too harshly about his mischief, and was caring with him, as any grandfather would be. He took Tsunekazu to the construction sights of Hōryū-ji from four years old, to get him to get used to the temple surroundings and atmosphere. He made him do chores as soon as he entered elementary school. It seemed as if he was a completely different person at those times because of his strictness. His grandfather intended to groom both his son-in-law and Tsunekazu to be the future Chief Carpenter. He especially made effort to provide a thorough education for Tsunekazu which became very valuable experience.

- Ever since he was an apprentice, Tsunekazu was trained rigorously by his grandfather. First, he learned how to sharpen his tools, which is the first thing that a carpenter must know. However, Tsunekichi didn't teach him at all, and Tsunekazu kept sharpening the tools every night until he learned how to do it. In his later years, Tsunekazu said "Things that you remember with your head you tend to forget quickly. Better to learn physically, with feeling.' 'It is important to learn by hand. If you don't teach the child, the child will work hard to learn by itself to seek the correct answers. By teaching them from the beginning, they will lack in their ability to think and try ones' best. Isn't this what schools today are forgetting?" He mentioned. "My grandfather taught and trained me with everything he knows, but anyway, he was tough and very strict. I was told to never whistle and to tightly tie the belt of my workman's short coat. Being sloppy was absolutely forbidden." Tsunekazu was taught how to behave in a respectable way with etiquette and manners, because members of the Japanese Imperial Family, and other honourable guests often visited Hōryū-ji. Nonetheless, it appeared to the onlooker that his grandfather became mild and gentle with old age. The apprentices of his grandfather said, "When it comes to his grandson, even the frightening master transformed into a Buddha."
- He reluctantly enrolled to an agricultural school because of his grandfather's command. Tsunekazu lacked the enthusiasm to learn, and ate fruits from the farm during class. However, as he learned further, he started to show interest and his grades improved. "You learn the right amount, the perfect timing, and where to plant fertilizer through experience and by thinking on your own. Sow seeds, sprouts come out, leaves grow, and harvest... This became more and more interesting to me. ...To learn more about 'The life of the soil'. My grandfather insisted for me to enroll here because he wanted me to understand this. However, I realized his plot so much after..." he mentioned. His grandfather wanted him to learn the transformation of life through learning the preciousness of life and the nature of the soil. His years in the agricultural school raised his quality to becoming the master carpenter. After many years, he appreciated his grandfather and the teachers for his amazing three years in school because what he learned in school became very useful when working as a carpenter.
- After graduating the agricultural school, his grandfather made him grow rice for a year. Tsunekazu did exactly what he learned in school. However, instead of praising him, his grandfather pointed out that crop was lower than the other farmers. He persuaded him and said, "You don't get advice from books, you must have a dialogue with the rice, and otherwise, the rice will never grow. Becoming a carpenter is the same. If you don't have a dialogue with the wood, you will never become a true carpenter."
- His grandfather showed him an example and taught him nothing at all after showing the example. He taught him by making him trial and error many times and thinking on his own. He scolded him very strictly at times, but evaluated him well. Tsunekazu mentioned, "He never complimented me directly. He always told my mother 'Tsunekazu is a great boy. He can do things before I teach him' My mother was always delighted to hear so and told me what he had told her. Grandfather always knew that she would, so he always complimented me indirectly'." At night, his grandfather often asked Tsunekazu to give him a massage, and during those times taught him what there was to know about carpentry.
- What Tsunekazu learned in the agricultural school became very useful in his career and later life. For example, the way to identify wood like Hinoki, Japanese Cypress trees. In his declining years, he mentioned "This is all because of my three years in the Ikoma Agricultural School. I finally understand grandfather's true intention."
- His grandfather often took young Tsunekazu to visit the temples of Nara to learn the basics of Japanese wooden architecture and carpentry. The East Pagoda in Yakushi-ji was reflected in a puddle near to the site of the West Pagoda which had long since been destroyed by fire. He explained, "This is called a "reflection pagoda".

== Oral Teachings (Kuden) ==
His grandfather passed on sets of traditional oral teachings and instructions - defined as the kuden - to both Tsunekazu and his father. These instructions could previously only be related by word-of-mouth since they were regarded as family secrets of the temple carpenters. Ten days later, he asked them a series of questions to check if they had both understood and remembered the words, and would then proceed to tell them the deeper meaning of the principles in later instructions. He would not teach the subsequent instructions until they had understood the initial ten principles.

The ten principles of the Kuden.

- A person who doesn't appreciate Shinto and Buddhist thought should remain quiet about the design of religious compounds.

Japanese: 神仏を崇めず仏法を賛仰せずして伽藍社頭を口にすべからず。

- When designing a temple complex, find a site that suits the requirements of the Shijin (Four Gods said to rule over the four directions).

Japanese: 伽藍造営には四神相應の地を選べ。

- When selecting building materials for temples, purchase the whole mountain, rather than individual trees.

Japanese: 堂塔の建立には木を買はず山を買へ。

- Use trees according to the orientation that they grew on the mountain.

Japanese: 木は生育の方位のままに使へ。

- When assembling the wooden structure of temple buildings, focus on each trees' characteristics, not merely on the measurements.

Japanese: 堂塔の木組は木の癖組。

- The characteristics of trees and the intentions of the miyadaiku should co-exist, in harmony.

Japanese: 木の癖組は工人たちの心組。

- The Tōryō should fully understand the thoughts of the other miyadaiku.

Japanese: 工人等の心根は匠長が工人への思やり。

- If there are 100 miyadaiku, there are 100 ideas. The Tōryō's responsibility is to organise them to work together, moving in the same direction.

Japanese: 百工あれば百念あり。一つに統ぶるが匠長が裁量也。

- If he does not possess the ability to unify 100 opinions into one, the Tōryō should respectfully resign their position.

Japanese: 百論一つに止まるを正とや云う也。一つに止めるの器量なきは謹み惧れ匠長の座を去れ。

- The traditions and techniques of our craft were not made in one day. They are gifts of divine virtue from our ancestral gods. We must never forget the gods.

Japanese: 諸々の技法は一日にして成らず。祖神の徳恵也。

Nishioka's recollected that,

- "The Tōryō of Hōryū-ji have been passing on these principles for generations. They previously communicated such important knowledge only by word-of-mouth, not as text. They wouldn't allow them to be written down. Previous generations of master carpenters passed them on to one apprentice carpenter out of a hundred, and they would select which miyadaiku they regard can truly become the Tōryō. Only someone with the finest carpentry techniques, personality, and the necessary qualifications can become the Tōryō. If one can remember the words by heart, it means that they do not truly understand. That is not a good thing. So, the Tōryō selects the person that they think is suitable to inherit the position, and proceeds to give them the oral instructions. I thought, 'How can people do such difficult things', but it is actually the simplest thing."

== Nishioka's architectural & building work ==
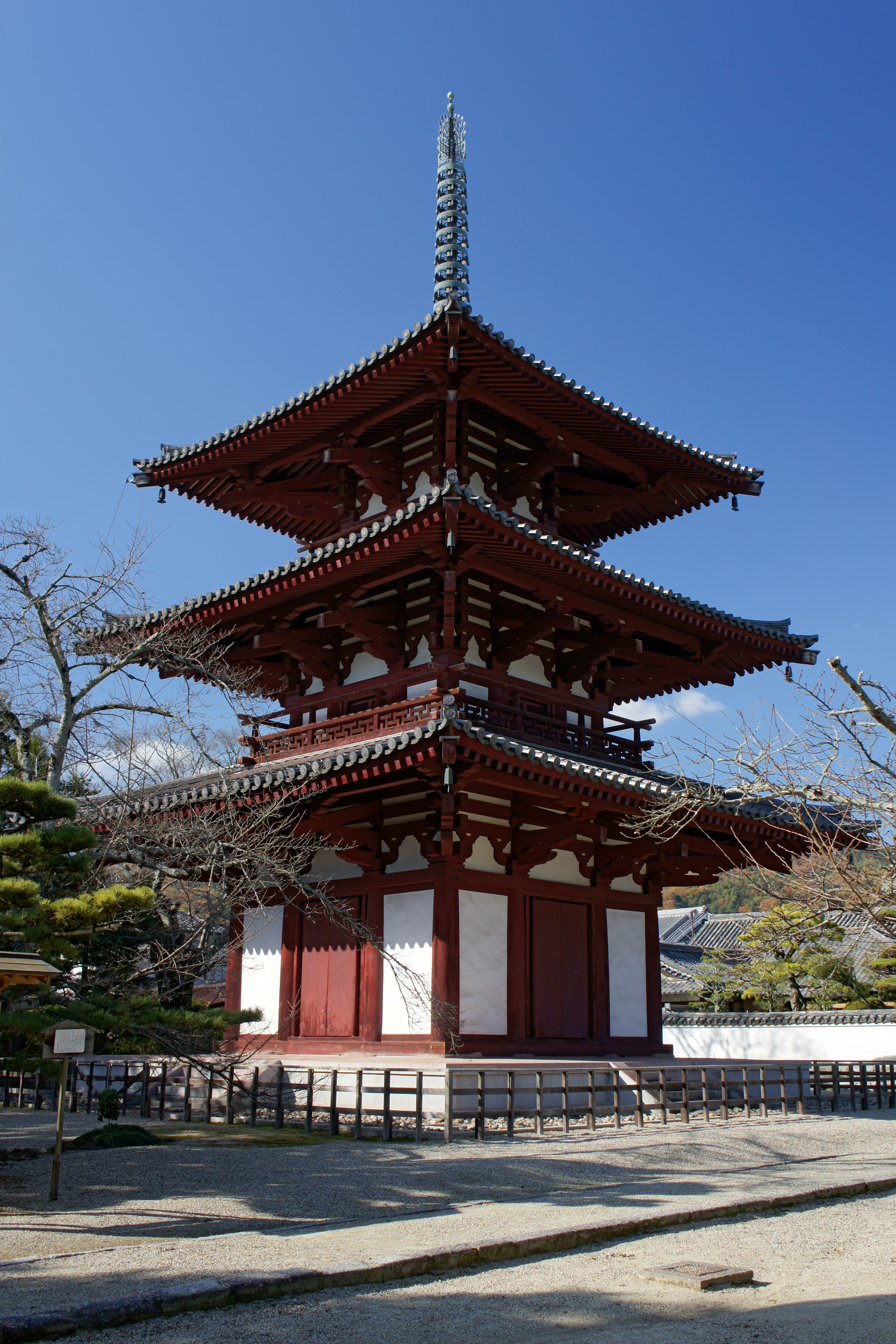
Three-storey pagoda Tō, Hōrin-ji (Nara)

- Repairs and reconstruction of the temple compound (garan) of Hōryū-ji, including the Sangyōin and Nishi Muro Halls, Tōinraido Hall, Daikodō Hall, Tōin Shariden and Eden Halls, Tōin Denpodo Hall, Kondō Hall, five-storey, Goju-no-tō pagoda, and the Higashi Muro Hall.
- Repairs and reconstruction of the Koudō Hall at Tōshōdai-ji.
- Reconstruction of the three-storey pagoda (Tō), at Hōrin-ji (Nara).
- Reconstruction of the Kondō (Main Hall), Saitō (West Pagoda) and restoration of the garan (temple compound) of Yakushi-ji.
- Repair and restoration of the Doumyou-ji Tenmangu Shrine in Fujidera, Osaka Prefecture.
- In January, 1977, Nishioka received the Jiji Culture Medal. In July, 1977, he received the award of Important Intangible Cultural Asset.
- In 1981 -
  - May 25 - He was awarded the honour of the Order of the Sacred Treasure.
  - May 29 - Received an award from the Architectural Institute of Japan.
  - May 30 - Received the Sankei Children's Book Award for the co-authored book titled Horyu-ji.

== Publications ==
- Ki ni Manabe: Hōryū-ji, Yakushi-ji no Bi, Tsunekazu Nishioka 1991, (Shogakkan Library), Tokyo: Shogakkan.
- Ki no Inochi, Ki no Kokoro, Tsunekazu Nishioka 1993, Tokyo: Shinchosha.
- Ikaruga no Takumi: Miyadaiku Sandai, Tsunekazu Nishioka・ Shigeru Aoyama 1977, Tokyo: Tokumashoten.
- Ki no Kokoro, Hotoke no Kokoro, Tsunekazu Nishioka・Matsuhisa Hourin・Shigeru Aoyama 1986, Tokyo: Shunjusha.
- Miyadaiku Tōryō, Nishioka Tsunekazu, "Kuden" no Omomi, Tsunekazu Nishioka 2005, Tokyo: Nihon Keizai Shinbunsha.
- Hōryū-ji Sasaeta ki, Tsunekazu Nishioka・Jiro Kohara 1978, Tokyo: NHK Books.
- Hōryū-ji: Sekai Saiko no Mokuzō Kenchiku, Tsunekazu Nishioka・Shigetaka Miyakami・Kazuo Hozumi 1980, Tokyo: Sōshisha.
- Yomigaeru Yakushi-ji Saitō, Tsunekazu Nishioka 1981, Tokyo: Sōshisha.
- The Building of Horyu-ji: The Technique and Wood that Made It Possible, Tsunekazu Nishioka and Jiro Kohara 2016, First English Edition, Tokyo: Japan Publishing Industry Foundation for Culture.

== Television programs ==
- 『Project X』 (NHK)

Japanese television companies produced and broadcast various feature programmes and documentaries on the life and work of Nishioka.

== Documentary Film ==
- Nishioka: The Master Of Japanese Carpentry.

Original Japanese title, Oni ni kike - Miyadaiku Nishioka Tsunekazu no yuigon (Japanese: 鬼に訊け 宮大工 西岡常一の遺言). Directed by Yuji Yamasaki, the documentary profile of the life and career of Tsunekazu Nishioka was released to great acclaim in Japan, becoming the most successful domestic documentary release of 2011.
It has been distributed internationally since 2015, to commemorate the 20th anniversary of Nishioka's passing.

== See also ==
- Japanese carpentry
- Japanese Buddhist architecture
- Hōryū-ji
- Yakushi-ji
- Hōrin-ji (Nara)
- Carpenter
- Cultural Property (Japan)
