= Nagasaki 1st district (1947–1993) =

Legislative district of Japan

Nagasaki 1st district was a constituency of the House of Representatives in the Diet of Japan. Between 1947 and 1993 it elected five Representatives by single non-transferable vote. It was located in Nagasaki and, as of 1993, consisted of the cities of Nagasaki, Isahaya and Shimabara and the Nishisonogi, Kitatakaki, Minamitakaki, Kamiagata and Shimoagata counties.

Representatives for Nagasaki 1st district included home minister Ichirō Honda, construction minister Motoharu Baba, foreign minister Tadashi Kuranari, education minister Takeo Nishioka (president of the House of Councillors in the 2010s, LDP vice secretary-general Fumio Kyūma (defence minister in the 1990s and 2000s) and NFP co-founder Yoshiaki Takaki (education minister in the 2010s).

== Summary of results during the 1955 party system ==
General election		1958	1960	1963	1967	1969	1972	1976	1979	1980	1983	1986	1990	1993
LDP & conservative independents		3	3	4	3	2	2	1	2	3	2	3	3	2
Opposition	center-left	0	0	0	0	2	2	3	2	1	2	1	1	2
Opposition	JSP	2	2	1	2	1	1	1	1	1	1	1	1	1
Opposition	JCP	0	0	0	0	0	0	0	0	0	0	0	0	0
Seats up		5												

== Elected Representatives ==
election year	highest vote (top tōsen)	2nd	3rd	4th	5th
1947	Ichirō Honda (JLP)	Hitoshi Imamura (JSP)	Eisuke Honda (JLP)	Torao Wakamatsu (JLP)	Takeo Kubo (DP)
1948 by-el.	Ichirō Honda (JLP)	Hachirō Tsubouchi (DLP)	Akisada Okanishi (DLP)	Torao Wakamatsu (JLP)	Takeo Kubo (DP)
1949	Ichirō Honda (DLP)	Hachirō Tsubouchi (DLP)	Chōjirō Taguchi (DLP)	Akisada Okanishi (DLP)	Torao Wakamatsu (DLP)
1952	Tsuyoshi Kihara (JSP, left)	Motoharu Baba (LP)	Ichirō Honda (LP)	Chiyoji Yukizawa (LP)	Chōjirō Taguchi (LP)
1953	Tsuyoshi Kihara (JSP, left)	Ichirō Honda (Yoshida LP)	Motoharu Baba (Yoshida LP)	Chōjirō Taguchi (Yoshida LP)	Tarō Nakajima (Progressive)
1955	Tsuyoshi Kihara (JSP, left)	Hitoshi Imamura (JSP, right)	Motoharu Baba (LP)	Tarō Nakajima (JDP)	Chōjirō Taguchi (LP)
1958	Motoharu Baba (LDP)	Chōjirō Taguchi (LDP)	Tadashi Kuranari (LDP)	Tsuyoshi Kihara (JSP)	Hitoshi Imamura (JSP)
1960	Motoharu Baba (LDP)	Tadashi Kuranari (LDP)	Chōjirō Taguchi (LDP)	Shigemitsu Nakamura (JSP)	Tsuyoshi Kihara (JSP)
1963	Tadashi Kuranari (LDP)	Chōjirō Taguchi (LDP)	Motoharu Baba (LDP)	Takeo Nishioka (Indep.)	Shigemitsu Nakamura (JSP)
1967	Takeo Nishioka (LDP)	Motoharu Baba (LDP)	Tadashi Kuranari (LDP)	Shigemitsu Nakamura (JSP)	Tsuyoshi Kihara (JSP)
1969	Tadashi Kuranari (LDP)	Nobuhito Matsuo (Kōmeitō)	Takeo Nishioka (LDP)	Takeki Komiya (DSP)	Shigemitsu Nakamura (JSP)
1972	Shigemitsu Nakamura (JSP)	Tadashi Kuranari (LDP)	Takeo Nishioka (LDP)	Takeki Komiya (DSP)	Nobuhito Matsuo (Kōmeitō)
1976	Takeo Nishioka (NLC)	Takeki Komiya (DSP)	Tadashi Kuranari (LDP)	Shigemitsu Nakamura (JSP)	Yoshinori Taniguchi (Kōmeitō)
1979	Tadashi Kuranari (LDP)	Shigemitsu Nakamura (JSP)	Takeo Nishioka (Indep.)	Yoshinori Taniguchi (Kōmeitō)	Masayoshi Kobuchi (DSP)
1980	Tadashi Kuranari (LDP)	Shigemitsu Nakamura (JSP)	Takeo Nishioka (Indep.)	Masayoshi Kobuchi (DSP)	Fumio Kyūma (LDP)
1983	Shigemitsu Nakamura (JSP)	Kakuji Miyazaki (Kōmeitō)	Masayoshi Kobuchi (DSP)	Tadashi Kuranari (LDP)	Fumio Kyūma (LDP)
1986	Takeo Nishioka (LDP)	Tadashi Kuranari (LDP)	Kenji Taguchi (JSP)	Masayoshi Kobuchi (DSP)	Fumio Kyūma (LDP)
1990	Kenji Taguchi (JSP)	Takeo Nishioka (LDP)	Yoshiaki Takaki (DSP)	Fumio Kyūma (LDP)	Tadashi Kuranari (LDP)
1993	Takeo Nishioka (LDP)	Ken'ichirō Hatsumura (JNP)	Fumio Kyūma (LDP)	Kenji Taguchi (JSP)	Yoshiaki Takaki (DSP)
