= Hokkaido's Diet electoral districts =

Hokkaido's House of Representatives districts since 2017

All seats

Sapporo seats

Hokkaido currently sends 26 elected members to the Diet of Japan, 20 to the House of Representatives and 6 to the House of Councillors. The prefecture sends 6 Councillors after the 2019.

== House of Representatives ==
The current House of Representatives Hokkaido delegation consists of 15 members of LDP, 4 members of CRA, and 1 member of DPP.

=== Constituency seats ===
District	Representative	Party	Incumbency
1st	Takahiro Katō	LDP	9 February 2026 – present
2nd	Yūsuke Takahashi	LDP	9 February 2026 – present
3rd	Hirohisa Takagi	LDP	9 February 2026 – present
4th	Hiroyuki Nakamura	LDP	17 December 2012 – present
5th	Yoshiaki Wada	LDP	9 February 2026 – present
6th	Kuniyoshi Azuma	LDP	1 November 2021 – present
7th	Takako Suzuki	LDP	3 June 2013 – present
8th	Jun Mukōyama	LDP	28 October 2024 – present
9th	Hideki Matsushita	LDP	9 February 2026 – present
10th	Hiroshi Kamiya	CRA	23 October 2017 – present
11th	Koichi Nakagawa	LDP	9 February 2026 – present
12th	Arata Takebe	LDP	17 December 2012 – present

=== PR seats ===
Party	Representative	District contested	Incumbency
LDP	Yoshitaka Itō	None	31 August 2009 – present
LDP	Koichi Watanabe	Hokkaido 10th	9 February 2026 – present
LDP	Nagisa Muraki	None	9 February 2026 – present
LDP	Yūri Yoshida	None	9 February 2026 – present
CRA	Hidemichi Satō	None	17 December 2012 – present
CRA	Tomoko Ukishima	None	17 December 2012 – present
CRA	Tatsumaru Yamaoka	Hokkaido 9th	23 October 2017 – present
DPP	Hidetake Usuki	Hokkaido 1st	28 October 2024 – present

== House of Councillors ==
The current House of Councillors Hokkaido delegation consists of 4 members of LDP and 2 members of CDP. The members are elected from the Hokkaido at-large district.

Class	#	Councillors	Party	Term ends	Incumbency
2022	1	Gaku Hasegawa	LDP	25 July 2028	26 July 2010 – present
2022	2	Eri Tokunaga	CDP	25 July 2028	26 July 2010 – present
2022	3	Toshimitsu Funahashi	LDP	25 July 2028	26 July 2022 – present
2025	1	Harumi Takahashi	LDP	28 July 2025	29 July 2019 – present
2025	2	Kenji Katsube	CDP	28 July 2025	29 July 2019 – present
2025	3	Tsuyohito Iwamoto	LDP	28 July 2025	29 July 2019 – present
