= Representatives elected in the 2026 Japanese general election =

This is a list of Representatives elected to the House of Representatives of Japan at the 2026 general election on 8 February 2026. The election resulted in a landslide win for the Liberal Democratic Party, led by Prime Minister Sanae Takaichi, and its coalition partner, the Japan Innovation Party based in Kansai. 10 days after the election on 18 February 2026, the Second Takaichi cabinet took office after Takaichi was reappointed Prime Minister by Emperor Naruhito as designated by the National Diet.

== Hokkaido block ==
=== Constituency (12 seats) ===
Hokkaido
Constituency	Party	Elected Member
Hokkaido-1st	LDP	Takahiro Katō
Hokkaido-2nd	LDP	Yūsuke Takahashi
Hokkaido-3rd	LDP	Hirohisa Takagi
Hokkaido-4th	LDP	Hiroyuki Nakamura
Hokkaido-5th	LDP	Yoshiaki Wada
Hokkaido-6th	LDP	Kuniyoshi Azuma
Hokkaido-7th	LDP	Takako Suzuki
Hokkaido-8th	LDP	Jun Mukōyama
Hokkaido-9th	LDP	Hideki Matsushita
Hokkaido-10th	CRA	Hiroshi Kamiya
Hokkaido-11th	LDP	Kōichi Nakagawa
Hokkaido-12th	LDP	Arata Takebe

=== Proportional Representation Seats (8 seats) ===
#	Party	Elected Member	Constituency
1	LDP	Yoshitaka Itō	PR only
2	CRA	Hidemichi Satō	PR only
3	LDP	Kōichi Watanabe	Hokkaido 10th
4	LDP	Nagisa Muraki	PR only
5	CRA	Tomoko Ukishima	PR only
6	LDP	Yūri Yoshida	PR only
7	DPP	Hidetake Usuki	Hokkaido 1st
8	CRA	Tatsumaru Yamaoka	Hokkaido 9th

== Tohoku block ==
=== Constituency (21 seats) ===
Aomori Prefecture
Constituency	Party	Elected Member
Aomori-1st	LDP	Jun Tsushima
Aomori-2nd	LDP	Junichi Kanda
Aomori-3rd	LDP	Jiro Kimura
Iwate Prefecture
Constituency	Party	Elected Member
Iwate-1st	CRA	Takeshi Shina
Iwate-2nd	LDP	Shun'ichi Suzuki
Iwate-3rd	LDP	Takashi Fujiwara
Miyagi Prefecture
Constituency	Party	Elected Member
Miyagi-1st	LDP	Tōru Doi
Miyagi-2nd	LDP	Katsuyuki Watanabe
Miyagi-3rd	LDP	Akihiro Nishimura
Miyagi-4th	LDP	Chisato Morishita
Miyagi-5th	LDP	Itsunori Onodera
Akita Prefecture
Constituency	Party	Elected Member
Akita-1st	LDP	Hiroyuki Togashi
Akita-2nd	LDP	Junji Fukuhara
Akita-3rd	DPP	Toshihide Muraoka
Yamagata Prefecture
Constituency	Party	Elected Member
Yamagata-1st	LDP	Hiroaki Endo
Yamagata-2nd	LDP	Norikazu Suzuki
Yamagata-3rd	LDP	Ayuko Kato
Fukushima Prefecture
Constituency	Party	Elected Member
Fukushima-1st	LDP	Naotoshi Nishiyama
Fukushima-2nd	LDP	Taku Nemoto
Fukushima-3rd	LDP	Kentarō Uesugi
Fukushima-4th	LDP	Ryutaro Sakamoto

=== Proportional Representation Seats (12 seats) ===
#	Party	Elected Member	Constituency
1	LDP	Akinori Eto	PR only
2	CRA	Kenichi Shōji	PR only
3	LDP	Nobuhide Minorikawa	Akita 3rd
4	LDP	Hiromasa Yonai	Iwate 1st
5	CRA	Yoshifu Arita	PR only
6	LDP	Shintaro Ito	PR only
7	DPP	Makoto Sasaki	Iwate 2nd
8	LDP	Ichirō Kanke	PR only
9	Sanseitō	Masamune Wada	Miyagi 2nd
10	CRA	Emi Kaneko	Fukushima 1st
11	LDP	Kenya Akiba	PR only
12	Mirai	Takumi Hayashi	PR only

== Northern Kanto block ==
=== Constituency (33 seats) ===
Ibaraki Prefecture
Constituency	Party	Elected Member
Ibaraki-1st	LDP	Yoshinori Tadokoro
Ibaraki-2nd	LDP	Fukushiro Nukaga
Ibaraki-3rd	LDP	Yasuhiro Hanashi
Ibaraki-4th	LDP	Hiroshi Kajiyama
Ibaraki-5th	DPP	Satoshi Asano
Ibaraki-6th	LDP	Ayano Kunimitsu
Ibaraki-7th	Ind.	Hayato Nakamura
Tochigi Prefecture
Constituency	Party	Elected Member
Tochigi-1st	LDP	Hajime Funada
Tochigi-2nd	LDP	Kiyoshi Igarashi
Tochigi-3rd	Ind.	Shintaro Watanabe
Tochigi-4th	LDP	Masaru Ishizaka
Tochigi-5th	LDP	Toshimitsu Motegi
Gunma Prefecture
Constituency	Party	Elected Member
Gunma-1st	LDP	Yasutaka Nakasone
Gunma-2nd	LDP	Toshiro Ino
Gunma-3rd	LDP	Hiroyoshi Sasagawa
Gunma-4th	LDP	Tatsuo Fukuda
Gunma-5th	LDP	Yūko Obuchi
Saitama Prefecture
Constituency	Party	Elected Member
Saitama-1st	LDP	Hideki Murai
Saitama-2nd	LDP	Yoshitaka Shindō
Saitama-3rd	LDP	Hitoshi Kikawada
Saitama-4th	LDP	Yasushi Hosaka
Saitama-5th	LDP	Yutaka Ihara
Saitama-6th	LDP	Akihito Obana
Saitama-7th	LDP	Hideyuki Nakano
Saitama-8th	LDP	Masahiko Shibayama
Saitama-9th	LDP	Taku Otsuka
Saitama-10th	LDP	Susumu Yamaguchi
Saitama-11th	LDP	Ryuji Koizumi
Saitama-12th	LDP	Atsushi Nonaka
Saitama-13th	LDP	Hiromi Mitsubayashi
Saitama-14th	LDP	Makoto Fujita
Saitama-15th	LDP	Ryosei Tanaka
Saitama-16th	LDP	Shinako Tsuchiya

=== Proportional Representation Seats (19 seats) ===
#	Party	Elected Member	Constituency
1	LDP	Kazuo Yana	Tochigi 3rd
2	CRA	Keiichi Ishii	PR only
3	LDP	Keiko Nagaoka	Ibaraki 7th
4	LDP	Takumi Suzuki	Ibaraki 5th
5	DPP	Mikihiko Hashimoto	Saitama 13th
6	CRA	Keiichi Koshimizu	PR only
7	LDP	Kazuyuki Nakane	PR only
8	Sanseitō	Mayuko Toyota	PR only
9	Mirai	Kazuko Mutō	PR only
10	LDP	Masayoshi Saijō	PR only
11	CRA	Takahiro Fukushige	PR only
12	LDP	Akimasa Ishikawa	PR only
13	Ishin	Yūji Kashiwakura	Tochigi 1st
14	LDP	Asako Omi	PR only
15	DPP	Yoshihiro Suzuki	Saitama 14th
16	CRA	Atsushi Oshima	Saitama 6th
17	LDP	Megumi Maekawa	PR only
18	JCP	Tetsuya Shiokawa	PR only
19	Sanseitō	Hitomi Aoki	Gunma 4th

== Southern Kanto block ==
=== Constituency (36 seats) ===
Chiba Prefecture
Constituency	Party	Elected Member
Chiba-1st	LDP	Hiroaki Kadoyama
Chiba-2nd	LDP	Takayuki Kobayashi
Chiba-3rd	LDP	Hirokazu Matsuno
Chiba-4th	LDP	Yūsuke Kashima
Chiba-5th	LDP	Arfiya Eri
Chiba-6th	LDP	Hiromichi Watanabe
Chiba-7th	LDP	Ken Saitō
Chiba-8th	LDP	Izumi Matsumoto
Chiba-9th	LDP	Hisato Tamiya
Chiba-10th	LDP	Masaaki Koike
Chiba-11th	LDP	Eisuke Mori
Chiba-12th	LDP	Yasukazu Hamada
Chiba-13th	LDP	Hisashi Matsumoto
Chiba-14th	CRA	Yoshihiko Noda
Kanagawa Prefecture
Constituency	Party	Elected Member
Kanagawa-1st	LDP	Natsuko Maruo
Kanagawa-2nd	LDP	Shōbun Nitta
Kanagawa-3rd	LDP	Kenji Nakanishi
Kanagawa-4th	LDP	Marina Nagata
Kanagawa-5th	LDP	Manabu Sakai
Kanagawa-6th	LDP	Naoki Furukawa
Kanagawa-7th	LDP	Keisuke Suzuki
Kanagawa-8th	LDP	Hidehiro Mitani
Kanagawa-9th	LDP	Masahiro Uehara
Kanagawa-10th	LDP	Kazunori Tanaka
Kanagawa-11th	LDP	Shinjiro Koizumi
Kanagawa-12th	LDP	Tsuyoshi Hoshino
Kanagawa-13th	LDP	Kōichirō Maruta
Kanagawa-14th	LDP	Jiro Akama
Kanagawa-15th	LDP	Taro Kono
Kanagawa-16th	LDP	Masashi Satō
Kanagawa-17th	LDP	Karen Makishima
Kanagawa-18th	LDP	Daishiro Yamagiwa
Kanagawa-19th	LDP	Tsuyoshi Kusama
Kanagawa-20th	LDP	Yui Kanazawa
Yamanashi Prefecture
Constituency	Party	Elected Member
Yamanashi-1st	LDP	Shinichi Nakatani
Yamanashi-2nd	LDP	Noriko Horiuchi

=== Proportional Representation Seats (23 seats) ===
#	Party	Elected Member	Constituency
1	LDP	Harunobu Nagano	Chiba 14th
2	CRA	Hideo Tsunoda	PR only
3	LDP	Satoshi Itō	PR only
4	LDP	Ryo Fuzuki	PR only
5	DPP	Jesús Fukasaku	Kanagawa 19th
6	CRA	Mitsuko Numazaki	PR only
7	Mirai	Michio Kawai	PR only
8	LDP	Hina Iwasaki	PR only
9	Sanseitō	Megu Nakaya	Chiba 13th
10	CRA	Naoki Harada	PR only
11	Ishin	Ryuna Kanemura	Kanagawa 10th
12	DPP	Yoshitaka Nishioka	Kanagawa 18th
13	CRA	Hirofumi Ryu	Kanagawa 9th
14	Mirai	Eri Yamada	PR only
15	JCP	Kimie Hatano	PR only
16	CRA	Yūichi Gotō	Kanagawa 16th
17	Sanseitō	Seiko Kudō	Chiba 3rd
18	DPP	Junko Okano	Chiba 5th
19	CRA	Yuki Waseda	Kanagawa 4th
20	Ishin	Mitsuhiro Yokota	Kanagawa 18th
21	Mirai	Shūhei Kobayashi	Chiba 5th
22	CRA	Kaname Tajima	Chiba 1st
23	Reiwa	Joji Yamamoto	PR only

== Tokyo block ==
=== Constituency (30 seats) ===
Tokyo
Constituency	Party	Elected Member
Tokyo-1st	LDP	Miki Yamada
Tokyo-2nd	LDP	Kiyoto Tsuji
Tokyo-3rd	LDP	Hirotaka Ishihara
Tokyo-4th	LDP	Masaaki Taira
Tokyo-5th	LDP	Kenji Wakamiya
Tokyo-6th	LDP	Shōgo Azemoto
Tokyo-7th	LDP	Tamayo Marukawa
Tokyo-8th	LDP	Hiroko Kado
Tokyo-9th	LDP	Isshu Sugawara
Tokyo-10th	LDP	Hayato Suzuki
Tokyo-11th	LDP	Hakubun Shimomura
Tokyo-12th	LDP	Kei Takagi
Tokyo-13th	LDP	Shin Tsuchida
Tokyo-14th	LDP	Midori Matsushima
Tokyo-15th	LDP	Kōki Ōzora
Tokyo-16th	LDP	Yohei Onishi
Tokyo-17th	LDP	Katsuei Hirasawa
Tokyo-18th	LDP	Kaoru Fukuda
Tokyo-19th	LDP	Yohei Matsumoto
Tokyo-20th	LDP	Seiji Kihara
Tokyo-21st	LDP	Kiyoshi Odawara
Tokyo-22nd	LDP	Tatsuya Ito
Tokyo-23rd	LDP	Shinichiro Kawamatsu
Tokyo-24th	LDP	Koichi Hagiuda
Tokyo-25th	LDP	Shinji Inoue
Tokyo-26th	LDP	Ueki Imaoka
Tokyo-27th	LDP	Yūichi Kurosaki
Tokyo-28th	LDP	Takao Andō
Tokyo-29th	LDP	Kōsuke Nagasawa
Tokyo-30th	LDP	Akihisa Nagashima

=== Proportional Representation Seats (19 seats) ===
#	Party	Elected Member	Constituency
1	LDP	Masashi Tanaka	PR only
2	LDP	Yuko Tsuji	PR only
3	CRA	Mitsunari Okamoto	PR only
4	Mirai	Satoshi Takayama	PR only
5	LDP	Kiyoko Morihara	PR only
6	DPP	Yosuke Mori	Tokyo 13th
7	CRA	Kōichi Kasai	PR only
8	Mirai	Yūya Mineshima	Tokyo 7th
9	Sanseitō	Rina Yoshikawa	Tokyo 1st
10	JCP	Tomoko Tamura	PR only
11	Ishin	Tsukasa Abe	Tokyo 12th
12	DPP	Kazumoto Takazawa	Tokyo 11th
13	CRA	Eriko Omori	PR only
14	Mirai	Noboru Usami	Tokyo 26th
15	CRA	Akira Nagatsuma	Tokyo 27th
16	DPP	Masae Ido	Tokyo 4th
17	CRA	Takayuki Ochiai	Tokyo 6th
18	Mirai	Akihiro Dobashi	Tokyo 2nd
19	Sanseitō	Mika Suzuki	Tokyo 22nd

== Hokuriku-Shin'etsu block ==
=== Constituency (19 seats) ===
Niigata Prefecture
Constituency	Party	Elected Member
Niigata-1st	LDP	Kō Uchiyama
Niigata-2nd	LDP	Isato Kunisada
Niigata-3rd	LDP	Hiroaki Saito
Niigata-4th	LDP	Eiichiro Washio
Niigata-5th	LDP	Shuichi Takatori
Toyama Prefecture
Constituency	Party	Elected Member
Toyama-1st	LDP	Hiroshi Nakada
Toyama-2nd	LDP	Eishun Ueda
Toyama-3rd	LDP	Keiichiro Tachibana
Ishikawa Prefecture
Constituency	Party	Elected Member
Ishikawa-1st	LDP	Takuo Komori
Ishikawa-2nd	LDP	Hajime Sasaki
Ishikawa-3rd	LDP	Shoji Nishida
Fukui Prefecture
Constituency	Party	Elected Member
Fukui-1st	LDP	Tomomi Inada
Fukui-2nd	LDP	Takeshi Saiki
Nagano Prefecture
Constituency	Party	Elected Member
Nagano-1st	LDP	Kenta Wakabayashi
Nagano-2nd	LDP	Hikaru Fujita
Nagano-3rd	LDP	Yosei Ide
Nagano-4th	LDP	Shigeyuki Goto
Nagano-5th	LDP	Ichiro Miyashita

=== Proportional Representation Seats (10 seats) ===
#	Party	Elected Member	Constituency
1	LDP	Hiroaki Tabata	PR only
2	LDP	Yosuke Kon	PR only
3	CRA	Hiromasa Nakagawa	PR only
4	LDP	Kōsuke Furui	PR only
5	DPP	Kai Odake	Ishikawa 1st
6	CRA	Kazuya Kondo	Ishikawa 3rd
7	Sanseitō	Yuichiro Kawa	Ishikawa 1st
8	Ishin	Kiyoshi Wakasa	Nagano 1st
9	CRA	Chinami Nishimura	Niigata 1st
10	CRA	Makiko Kikuta	Niigata 2nd

== Tokai block ==
=== Constituency (33 seats) ===
Gifu Prefecture
Constituency	Party	Elected Member
Gifu-1st	LDP	Seiko Noda
Gifu-2nd	LDP	Yasufumi Tanahashi
Gifu-3rd	LDP	Yoji Muto
Gifu-4th	LDP	Tomohiro Katō
Gifu-5th	LDP	Keiji Furuya
Shizuoka Prefecture
Constituency	Party	Elected Member
Shizuoka-1st	LDP	Yōko Kamikawa
Shizuoka-2nd	LDP	Tatsunori Ibayashi
Shizuoka-3rd	LDP	Yūzō Yamamoto
Shizuoka-4th	LDP	Yoichi Fukazawa
Shizuoka-5th	LDP	Goshi Hosono
Shizuoka-6th	LDP	Takaaki Katsumata
Shizuoka-7th	LDP	Minoru Kiuchi
Shizuoka-8th	LDP	Daisuke Inaba
Aichi Prefecture
Constituency	Party	Elected Member
Aichi-1st	TCJ-Yukoku	Takashi Kawamura
Aichi-2nd	DPP	Motohisa Furukawa
Aichi-3rd	LDP	Yoshihiko Mizuno
Aichi-4th	LDP	Shōzō Kudō
Aichi-5th	LDP	Yasuhiro Okamoto
Aichi-6th	LDP	Hideki Niwa
Aichi-7th	DPP	Saria Hino
Aichi-8th	LDP	Tadahiko Ito
Aichi-9th	LDP	Yasumasa Nagasaka
Aichi-10th	LDP	Shinji Wakayama
Aichi-11th	DPP	Midori Tanno
Aichi-12th	LDP	Shuhei Aoyama
Aichi-13th	LDP	Taku Ishii
Aichi-14th	LDP	Soichiro Imaeda
Aichi-15th	LDP	Yukinori Nemoto
Aichi-16th	LDP	Shizuo Yamashita
Mie Prefecture
Constituency	Party	Elected Member
Mie-1st	LDP	Norihisa Tamura
Mie-2nd	LDP	Hideto Kawasaki
Mie-3rd	LDP	Masataka Ishihara
Mie-4th	LDP	Eikei Suzuki

=== Proportional Representation Seats (21 seats) ===
#	Party	Elected Member	Constituency
1	LDP	Sakon Yamamoto	PR only
2	LDP	Junji Suzuki	Aichi 7th
3	CRA	Yasuhiro Nakagawa	PR only
4	LDP	Hiromichi Kumada	Aichi 1st
5	DPP	Ken Tanaka	Shizuoka 4th
6	LDP	Hideki Tsuji	Aichi 2nd
7	CRA	Katsuhide Nishizono	PR only
8	Sanseitō	Airi Watanabe	Aichi 5th
9	LDP	Tadamori Fujisawa	Aichi 11th
10	Mirai	Eitarō Sudō	PR only
11	LDP	Kenichi Hosoda	PR only
12	DPP	Toru Fukuta	Aichi 16th
13	Ishin	Kenichiro Seki	Aichi 15th
14	CRA	Akiyoshi Inukai	PR only
15	LDP	Takamoto Nakagawa	PR only
16	LDP	Rie Saito	PR only
17	CRA	Kazuhiko Shigetoku	Aichi 12th
18	LDP	Koichiro Osada	PR only
19	DPP	Miho Nomura	Gifu 2nd
20	Sanseitō	Keisuke Itō	Gifu 3rd
21	LDP	Mamiko Seko	PR only

== Kansai (Kinki) block ==
=== Constituency (45 seats) ===
Shiga Prefecture
Constituency	Party	Elected Member
Shiga-1st	LDP	Toshitaka Ōoka
Shiga-2nd	LDP	Kenichiro Ueno
Shiga-3rd	LDP	Nobuhide Takemura
Kyoto Prefecture
Constituency	Party	Elected Member
Kyoto-1st	LDP	Yasushi Katsume
Kyoto-2nd	Ishin	Seiji Maehara
Kyoto-3rd	CRA	Kenta Izumi
Kyoto-4th	LDP	Keiro Kitagami
Kyoto-5th	LDP	Taro Honda
Kyoto-6th	LDP	Hiromichi Sonosaki
Osaka Prefecture
Constituency	Party	Elected Member
Osaka-1st	Ishin	Hidetaka Inoue
Osaka-2nd	Ishin	Ryo Takami
Osaka-3rd	Ishin	Tōru Azuma
Osaka-4th	Ishin	Teruo Minobe
Osaka-5th	Ishin	Satoshi Umemura
Osaka-6th	Ishin	Kaoru Nishida
Osaka-7th	Ishin	Takemitsu Okushita
Osaka-8th	Ishin	Joji Uruma
Osaka-9th	Ishin	Kei Hagihara
Osaka-10th	Ishin	Taku Ikeshita
Osaka-11th	Ishin	Hiroshi Nakatsuka
Osaka-12th	Ishin	Fumitake Fujita
Osaka-13th	Ishin	Ryohei Iwatani
Osaka-14th	Ishin	Hitoshi Aoyagi
Osaka-15th	Ishin	Yasuto Urano
Osaka-16th	Ishin	Masaki Kuroda
Osaka-17th	Ishin	Nobuyuki Baba
Osaka-18th	Ishin	Takashi Endo
Osaka-19th	LDP	Tomu Tanigawa
Hyōgo Prefecture
Constituency	Party	Elected Member
Hyōgo-1st	LDP	Masahito Moriyama
Hyōgo-2nd	Ishin	Keishi Abe
Hyōgo-3rd	LDP	Yoshihiro Seki
Hyōgo-4th	LDP	Hisayuki Fujii
Hyōgo-5th	LDP	Koichi Tani
Hyōgo-6th	LDP	Masaki Ogushi
Hyōgo-7th	LDP	Kenji Yamada
Hyōgo-8th	LDP	Shigeharu Aoyama
Hyōgo-9th	LDP	Yasutoshi Nishimura
Hyōgo-10th	LDP	Kisaburo Tokai
Hyōgo-11th	LDP	Motoyasu Yamada
Hyōgo-12th	LDP	Tsuyoshi Yamaguchi
Nara Prefecture
Constituency	Party	Elected Member
Nara-1st	LDP	Shigeki Kobayashi
Nara-2nd	LDP	Sanae Takaichi
Nara-3rd	LDP	Taido Tanose
Wakayama Prefecture
Constituency	Party	Elected Member
Wakayama-1st	LDP	Daichi Yamamoto
Wakayama-2nd	Ind.	Hiroshige Sekō

=== Proportional Representation Seats (28 seats) ===
#	Party	Elected Member	Constituency
1	LDP	Hiroo Kotera	PR only
2	Ishin	Daisuke Harayama	Nara 3rd
3	LDP	Masatoshi Ishida	PR only
4	Ishin	Nobuhisa Itō	Osaka 19th
5	CRA	Kazuyoshi Akaba	PR only
6	LDP	Mamoru Shigemoto	Kyoto 3rd
7	Ishin	Koichiro Ichimura	Hyōgo 6th
8	LDP	Naomi Tokashiki	Osaka 7th
9	CRA	Hiromasa Nakano	PR only
10	DPP	Akinari Kawai	Shiga 1st
11	Sanseitō	Masaru Ishikawa	Osaka 7th
12	LDP	Kōichi Munekiyo	Osaka 13th
13	Ishin	Kōtaro Ikehata	Hyōgo 12th
14	JCP	Kotaro Tatsumi	PR only
15	LDP	Keiichiro Kōrai	Osaka 8th
16	CRA	Kanae Yamamoto	PR only
17	Ishin	Hiroki Sumiyoshi	Hyōgo 11th
18	LDP	Yasuhide Nakayama	Osaka 4th
19	Ishin	Kee Miki	Hyōgo 7th
20	LDP	Tomoaki Shimada	Osaka 15th
21	CRA	Shinichi Isa	PR only
22	DPP	Kōichi Mukoyama	Hyōgo 3rd
23	LDP	Junpei Higashida	Osaka 9th
24	Sanseitō	Kōichiro Tani	Hyōgo 6th
25	Ishin	Alex Saito	Shiga 1st
26	LDP	Yoji Fujita	Kyoto 2nd
27	Ishin	Yuichiro Ichitani	Hyōgo 1st
28	CRA	Tōru Kunishige	PR only

== Chugoku block ==
=== Constituency (17 seats) ===
Tottori Prefecture
Constituency	Party	Elected Member
Tottori-1st	LDP	Shigeru Ishiba
Tottori-2nd	LDP	Ryosei Akazawa
Shimane Prefecture
Constituency	Party	Elected Member
Shimane-1st	LDP	Emiko Takagai
Shimane-2nd	LDP	Yasuhiro Takami
Okayama Prefecture
Constituency	Party	Elected Member
Okayama-1st	LDP	Ichiro Aisawa
Okayama-2nd	LDP	Takashi Yamashita
Okayama-3rd	LDP	Katsunobu Katō
Okayama-4th	LDP	Gaku Hashimoto
Hiroshima Prefecture
Constituency	Party	Elected Member
Hiroshima-1st	LDP	Fumio Kishida
Hiroshima-2nd	LDP	Hiroshi Hiraguchi
Hiroshima-3rd	LDP	Rintaro Ishibashi
Hiroshima-4th	LDP	Masayoshi Shintani
Hiroshima-5th	LDP	Shin Yamamoto
Hiroshima-6th	LDP	Fumiaki Kobayashi
Yamaguchi Prefecture
Constituency	Party	Elected Member
Yamaguchi-1st	LDP	Masahiro Kōmura
Yamaguchi-2nd	LDP	Nobuchiyo Kishi
Yamaguchi-3rd	LDP	Yoshimasa Hayashi

=== Proportional Representation Seats (10 seats) ===
#	Party	Elected Member	Constituency
1	LDP	Minoru Terada	PR only
2	LDP	Shojiro Hiranuma	PR only
3	CRA	Tetsuo Saito	PR only
4	LDP	Shinji Yoshida	PR only
5	LDP	Toshiko Abe	PR only
6	CRA	Akira Hirabayashi	PR only
7	DPP	Seri Nabeshima	Hiroshima 4th
8	LDP	Yūji Tawarada	PR only
9	Sanseitō	Kaoru Shimamura	Yamaguchi 3rd
10	Ishin	Yoshinori Kita	PR only

== Shikoku block ==
=== Constituency (10 seats) ===
Tokushima Prefecture
Constituency	Party	Elected Member
Tokushima-1st	LDP	Hirobumi Niki
Tokushima-2nd	LDP	Shunichi Yamaguchi
Kagawa Prefecture
Constituency	Party	Elected Member
Kagawa-1st	CRA	Junya Ogawa
Kagawa-2nd	DPP	Yuichiro Tamaki
Kagawa-3rd	LDP	Keitaro Ohno
Ehime Prefecture
Constituency	Party	Elected Member
Ehime-1st	LDP	Akihisa Shiozaki
Ehime-2nd	LDP	Takumi Ihara
Ehime-3rd	LDP	Junji Hasegawa
Kōchi Prefecture
Constituency	Party	Elected Member
Kōchi-1st	LDP	Gen Nakatani
Kōchi-2nd	LDP	Masanao Ozaki

=== Proportional Representation Seats (6 seats) ===
#	Party	Elected Member	Constituency
1	LDP	Takuya Hirai	Kagawa 1st
2	LDP	Takakazu Seto	Kagawa 2nd
3	CRA	Masayasu Yamasaki	PR only
4	LDP	Seiichiro Murakami	PR only
5	DPP	Kamon Iizumi	Tokushima 2nd
6	LDP	Norihiro Nakayama	PR only

== Kyushu block ==
=== Constituency (34 seats) ===
Fukuoka Prefecture
Constituency	Party	Elected Member
Fukuoka-1st	LDP	Takahiro Inoue
Fukuoka-2nd	LDP	Makoto Oniki
Fukuoka-3rd	LDP	Atsushi Koga
Fukuoka-4th	LDP	Hideki Miyauchi
Fukuoka-5th	LDP	Wataru Kurihara
Fukuoka-6th	LDP	Jiro Hatoyama
Fukuoka-7th	LDP	Satoshi Fujimaru
Fukuoka-8th	LDP	Tarō Asō
Fukuoka-9th	Ind.	Rintaro Ogata
Fukuoka-10th	LDP	Haruka Yoshimura
Fukuoka-11th	LDP	Ryota Takeda
Saga Prefecture
Constituency	Party	Elected Member
Saga-1st	LDP	Kazuchika Iwata
Saga-2nd	LDP	Yasushi Furukawa
Nagasaki Prefecture
Constituency	Party	Elected Member
Nagasaki-1st	DPP	Hideko Nishioka
Nagasaki-2nd	LDP	Ryusho Kato
Nagasaki-3rd	LDP	Yozo Kaneko
Kumamoto Prefecture
Constituency	Party	Elected Member
Kumamoto-1st	LDP	Minoru Kihara
Kumamoto-2nd	LDP	Daisuke Nishino
Kumamoto-3rd	LDP	Tetsushi Sakamoto
Kumamoto-4th	LDP	Yasushi Kaneko
Ōita Prefecture
Constituency	Party	Elected Member
Ōita-1st	LDP	Hiroaki Etō
Ōita-2nd	LDP	Ken Hirose
Ōita-3rd	LDP	Takeshi Iwaya
Miyazaki Prefecture
Constituency	Party	Elected Member
Miyazaki-1st	CRA	Sō Watanabe
Miyazaki-2nd	DPP	Shinji Nagatomo
Miyazaki-3rd	LDP	Yoshihisa Furukawa
Kagoshima Prefecture
Constituency	Party	Elected Member
Kagoshima-1st	LDP	Takuma Miyaji
Kagoshima-2nd	LDP	Satoshi Mitazono
Kagoshima-3rd	CRA	Takeshi Noma
Kagoshima-4th	LDP	Hiroshi Moriyama
Okinawa Prefecture
Constituency	Party	Elected Member
Okinawa-1st	LDP	Konosuke Kokuba
Okinawa-2nd	LDP	Masahisa Miyazaki
Okinawa-3rd	LDP	Aiko Shimajiri
Okinawa-4th	LDP	Kozaburo Nishime

=== Proportional Representation Seats (20 seats) ===
#	Party	Elected Member	Constituency
1	LDP	Yasuhiro Ozato	Kagoshima 3rd
2	LDP	Taku Etō	Miyazaki 2nd
3	CRA	Masakazu Hamachi	PR only
4	LDP	Shunsuke Takei	Miyazaki 1st
5	LDP	Asato Mihara	Fukuoka 9th
6	CRA	Nobuhiro Yoshida	PR only
7	Sanseitō	Toshiyuki Kinoshita	Fukuoka 2nd
8	DPP	Ryotaro Konomi	Fukuoka 4th
9	LDP	Masumi Asada	Nagasaki 1st
10	LDP	Hiroshi Ueno	PR only
11	CRA	Yasukuni Kinjo	PR only
12	Mirai	Aoi Furukawa	PR only
13	Ishin	Tomonobu Murakami	Fukuoka 11th
14	LDP	Hirotake Yasuoka	PR only
15	LDP	Hiroki Abe	PR only
16	CRA	Yoshihiro Kawano	PR only
17	LDP	Aki Shirasaka	PR only
18	Sanseitō	Shunichi Makino	Kagoshima 1st
19	DPP	Masahiko Kondō	Fukuoka 6th
20	LDP	Masami Kawano	PR only
