= 2026 Japanese general election in Hokkaido =

8 February 2026 event

- 8 February 2026

All 20 seats to the House of Representatives
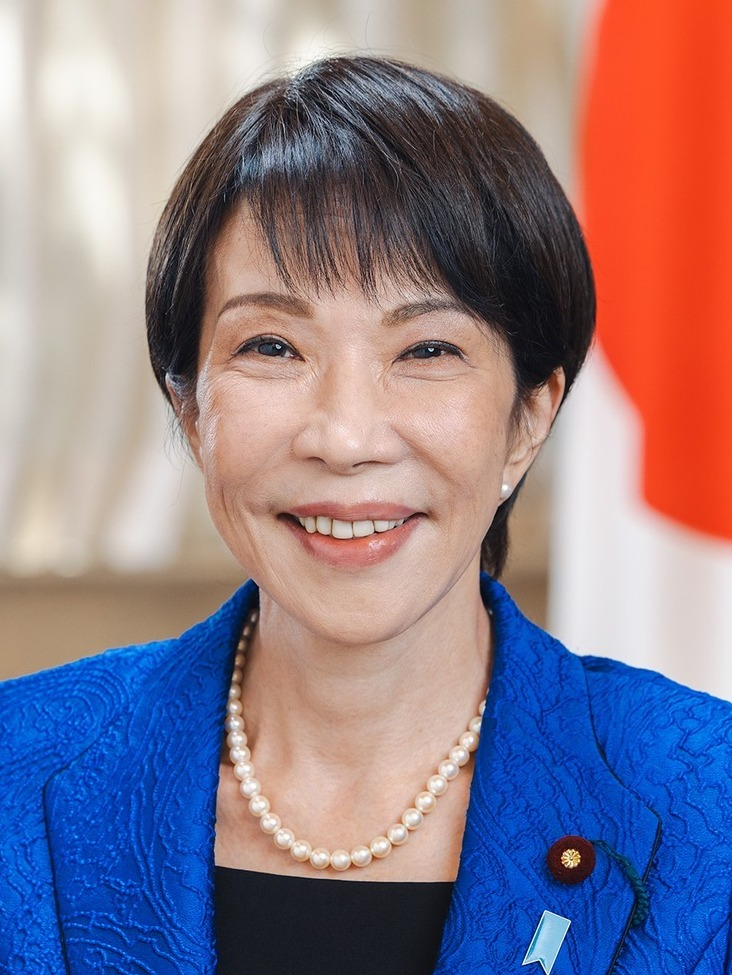

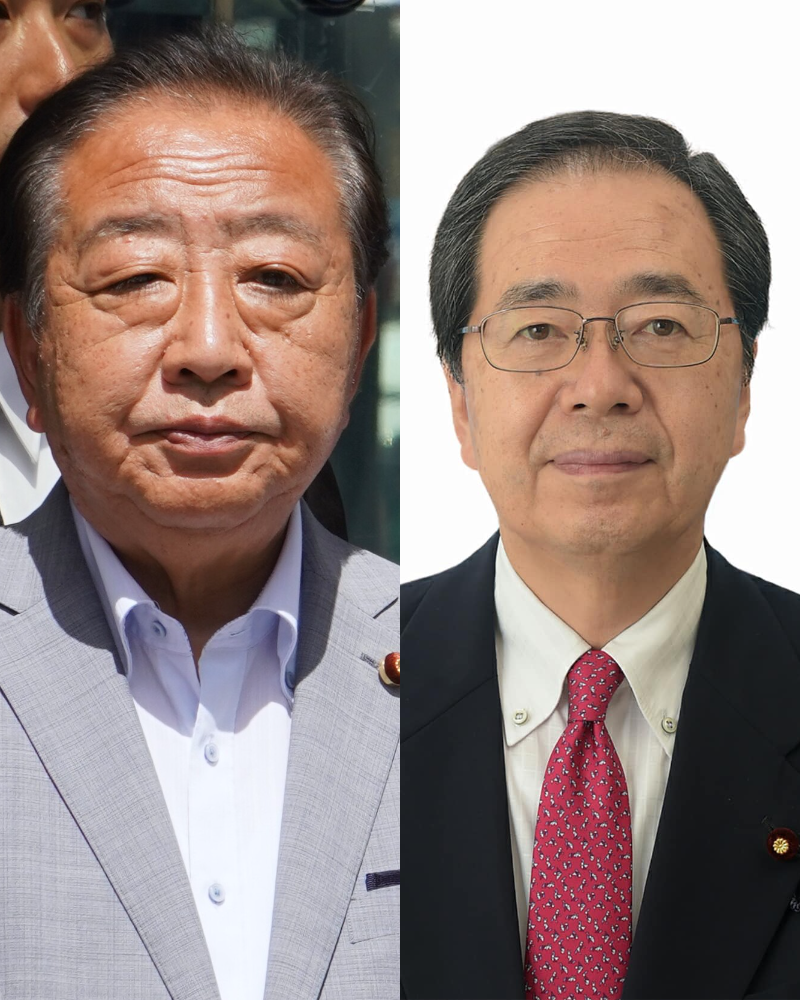

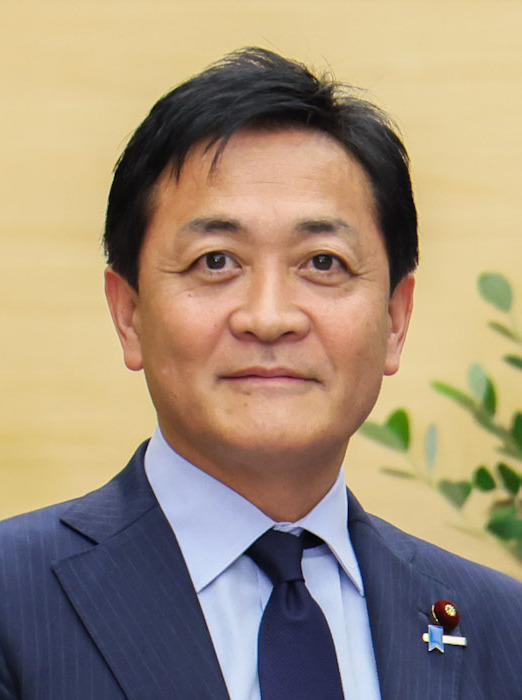
	Majority party	Minority party	Third party
Party	LDP	Centrist Reform	DPP
Last election	6 seats	13 seats (Note: As CDP and Komeito)	1 seats
Constituency	11	1	0
Constituency vote	1,238,262; 50.63%	932,617; 38.13%	29,134; 1.19%
PR seats	4	3	1
Regional vote	911,742; 37.01%	605,889; 24.60%	218,850; 8.88%
Total	15	4	1
Seat change	▲9	▼9	0

This page contains the detailed results for the 2026 Japanese general election in the Hokkaido proportional representation block.

The Hokkaido block covers the prefecture of Hokkaido and elects 8 members by party list proportional representation. In addition to the block seats, Hokkaido has 12 constituencies each electing a single member by first-past-the-post voting.

== Overall results ==
Hokkaido has been known as a stronghold of left-wing and liberal politics since the time of the Japan Socialist Party, and was called "the kingdom of the Democratic Party" during the period of the Democratic Party of Japan. In 2024, the Constitutional Democratic Party won nine out of twelve constituencies, while the Liberal Democratic Party won three. However, in 2026, the LDP swept eleven out of twelve due to the high popularity of Prime Minister Sanae Takaichi, and the Centrist Reform Alliance won only one.

Party	Constituency			Proportional			Total seats
Party	Votes	%	Seats	Votes	%	Seats	Total seats
Liberal Democratic Party	1,238,262	50.63	11	911,742	37.01	4	15
Centrist Reform Alliance	932,617	38.13	1	605,889	24.60	3	4
Democratic Party For the People	29,134	1.19	0	218,850	8.88	1	1
Sanseito	140,017	5.72	0	163,329	6.63	0	0
Team Mirai				134,613	5.46	0	0
Japanese Communist Party	87,141	3.56	0	134,084	5.44	0	0
Nippon Ishin no Kai	18,625	0.76	0	93,966	3.81	0	0
Reiwa Shinsengumi				76,099	3.09	0	0
Conservative Party of Japan				60,119	2.44	0	0
Tax Cuts Japan and Yukoku Alliance				32,878	1.33	0	0
Social Democratic Party				31,753	1.29	0	0
Total	2,445,796	100.00	12	2,463,322	100.00	8	20
Invalid/blank votes	39,650	1.60		57,413	2.28		
Voter turnout	2,485,446	57.51		2,520,736	58.33		
Registered voters	4,321,464			4,321,464			

== Single-member constituencies ==
Single-member constituency results in Hokkaido
Constituency	Previous member		Elected member		Votes	%	Margin	Status
Hokkaido 1st	Daiki Michishita	CRA	Takahiro Katō	LDP	112,618	43.6	31,058	LDP gain from CRA
Hokkaido 2nd	Kenko Matsuki	CRA	Yūsuke Takahashi	LDP	102,343	42.9	29,673	LDP gain from CRA
Hokkaido 3rd	Yutaka Arai	CRA	Hirohisa Takagi	LDP	114,285	46.5	32,967	LDP gain from CRA
Hokkaido 4th	Kureha Otsuki	CRA	Hiroyuki Nakamura	LDP	105,656	47.3	22,140	LDP gain from CRA
Hokkaido 5th	Maki Ikeda	CRA	Yoshiaki Wada	LDP	143,229	57.5	37,385	LDP gain from CRA
Hokkaido 6th	Kuniyoshi Azuma	LDP	Kuniyoshi Azuma	LDP	121,276	56.1	41,322	LDP hold
Hokkaido 7th	Takako Suzuki	LDP	Takako Suzuki	LDP	89,336	65.7	42,748	LDP hold
Hokkaido 8th	Seiji Osaka	CRA	Jun Mukōyama	LDP	108,229	55.3	20,703	LDP gain from CRA
Hokkaido 9th	Tatsumaru Yamaoka	CRA	Hideki Matsushita	LDP	87,984	43.1	6,921	LDP gain from CRA
Hokkaido 10th	Hiroshi Kamiya	CRA	Hiroshi Kamiya	CRA	74,908	50.0	21	CRA hold
Hokkaido 11th	Kaori Ishikawa	CRA	Kōichi Nakagawa	LDP	86,019	50.1	13,068	LDP gain from CRA
Hokkaido 12th	Arata Takebe	LDP	Arata Takebe	LDP	92,400	58.8	27,681	LDP hold

Hokkaido 1st district
Party	Candidate	Constituency		Proportional	
Party	Candidate	Votes	%	Votes	%
Liberal Democratic Party	Takahiro Katō	112,618	43.61	89,181	34.23
Centrist Reform Alliance	Daiki Michishita	81,560	31.58	56,213	21.57
Democratic Party For the People	Hidetake Usuki	29,134	11.28	26,712	10.25
Team Mirai				21,394	8.21
Sanseito	Chizuko Kanou	22,024	8.53	18,131	6.96
Japanese Communist Party	Tsuneto Mori	12,906	5.00	13,720	5.27
Nippon Ishin no Kai				11,971	4.59
Conservative Party of Japan				8,193	3.14
Reiwa Shinsengumi				7,378	2.83
Tax Cuts Japan and Yukoku Alliance				4,263	1.64
Social Democratic Party				3,392	1.30
Total		258,242	100.00	260,548	100.00
Invalid/blank votes					
Voter turnout			57.96		
Registered voters		453,829		453,829	
LDP gain from CRA					

Hokkaido 2nd district
Party	Candidate	Constituency		Proportional	
Party	Candidate	Votes	%	Votes	%
Liberal Democratic Party	Yūsuke Takahashi	102,343	42.87	80,061	33.18
Centrist Reform Alliance	Kenko Matsuki	72,670	30.44	52,770	21.87
Democratic Party For the People				24,627	10.21
Sanseito	Ayako Nakada	27,591	11.56	17,991	7.46
Team Mirai				16,625	6.89
Nippon Ishin no Kai	Izumi Yamazaki	18,625	7.80	12,925	5.36
Japanese Communist Party	Daisuke Hiraoka	17,515	7.34	15,839	6.56
Reiwa Shinsengumi				7,014	2.91
Conservative Party of Japan				6,955	2.88
Tax Cuts Japan and Yukoku Alliance				3,449	1.43
Social Democratic Party				3,013	1.25
Total		238,744	100.00	241,269	100.00
Invalid/blank votes					
Voter turnout			52.99		
Registered voters		459,581		459,581	
LDP gain from CRA					

Hokkaido 3rd district
Party	Candidate	Constituency		Proportional	
Party	Candidate	Votes	%	Votes	%
Liberal Democratic Party	Hirohisa Takagi	114,285	46.45	83,080	33.39
Centrist Reform Alliance	Yutaka Arai	81,318	33.05	56,225	22.59
Democratic Party For the People				26,840	10.79
Sanseito	Yoshiki Nakashima	34,838	14.16	19,316	7.76
Team Mirai				17,213	6.92
Japanese Communist Party	Yuuko Maruko	15,595	6.34	13,297	5.34
Nippon Ishin no Kai				11,622	4.67
Reiwa Shinsengumi				7,454	3.00
Conservative Party of Japan				7,323	2.94
Tax Cuts Japan and Yukoku Alliance				3,576	1.44
Social Democratic Party				2,898	1.16
Total		246,036	100.00	248,844	100.00
Invalid/blank votes					
Voter turnout			54.39		
Registered voters		462,088		462,088	
LDP gain from CRA					

Hokkaido 4th district
Party	Candidate	Constituency		Proportional	
Party	Candidate	Votes	%	Votes	%
Liberal Democratic Party	Hiroyuki Nakamura	105,656	47.33	80,249	35.87
Centrist Reform Alliance	Kureha Otsuki	83,516	37.41	58,631	26.21
Democratic Party For the People				18,944	8.47
Sanseito	Shouta Takahashi	20,051	8.98	14,728	6.58
Japanese Communist Party	Akemi Sasaki	14,005	6.27	14,056	6.28
Team Mirai				11,819	5.28
Nippon Ishin no Kai				8,131	3.63
Reiwa Shinsengumi				6,519	2.91
Conservative Party of Japan				5,120	2.29
Tax Cuts Japan and Yukoku Alliance				2,824	1.26
Social Democratic Party				2,716	1.21
Total		223,228	100.00	223,737	100.00
Invalid/blank votes					
Voter turnout			57.20		
Registered voters		396,704		396,704	
LDP gain from CRA					

Hokkaido 5th district
Party	Candidate	Constituency		Proportional	
Party	Candidate	Votes	%	Votes	%
Liberal Democratic Party	Yoshiaki Wada	143,229	57.50	94,639	37.32
Centrist Reform Alliance	Maki Ikeda	105,844	42.50	60,380	23.81
Democratic Party For the People				23,294	9.19
Sanseito				17,431	6.87
Team Mirai				14,589	5.75
Japanese Communist Party				12,457	4.91
Nippon Ishin no Kai				10,401	4.10
Reiwa Shinsengumi				7,224	2.85
Conservative Party of Japan				6,552	2.58
Social Democratic Party				3,369	1.33
Tax Cuts Japan and Yukoku Alliance				3,261	1.29
Total		249,073	100.00	253,597	100.00
Invalid/blank votes					
Voter turnout			60.21		
Registered voters		427,594		427,594	
LDP gain from CRA					

Hokkaido 6th district
Party	Candidate	Constituency		Proportional	
Party	Candidate	Votes	%	Votes	%
Liberal Democratic Party	Kuniyoshi Azuma	121,276	56.09	83,625	38.38
Centrist Reform Alliance	Masahito Nishikawa	79,954	36.98	55,542	25.49
Democratic Party For the People				17,936	8.23
Sanseito				12,893	5.92
Japanese Communist Party	Kazutoshi Ogiu	14,978	6.93	12,058	5.53
Team Mirai				10,311	4.73
Nippon Ishin no Kai				7,537	3.46
Reiwa Shinsengumi				7,483	3.43
Conservative Party of Japan				4,533	2.08
Social Democratic Party				3,059	1.40
Tax Cuts Japan and Yukoku Alliance				2,894	1.33
Total		216,208	100.00	217,871	100.00
Invalid/blank votes					
Voter turnout			56.54		
Registered voters		392,868		392,868	
LDP hold					

Hokkaido 7th district
Party	Candidate	Constituency		Proportional	
Party	Candidate	Votes	%	Votes	%
Liberal Democratic Party	Takako Suzuki	89,336	65.72	57,525	42.16
Centrist Reform Alliance	Naoko Shinoda	46,588	34.28	32,537	23.85
Democratic Party For the People				10,467	7.67
Sanseito				8,164	5.98
Japanese Communist Party				6,902	5.06
Team Mirai				5,455	4.00
Reiwa Shinsengumi				4,831	3.54
Nippon Ishin no Kai				4,132	3.03
Conservative Party of Japan				3,079	2.26
Social Democratic Party				1,683	1.23
Tax Cuts Japan and Yukoku Alliance				1,666	1.22
Total		135,924	100.00	136,441	100.00
Invalid/blank votes					
Voter turnout			59.16		
Registered voters		235,774		235,774	
LDP hold					

Hokkaido 8th district
Party	Candidate	Constituency		Proportional	
Party	Candidate	Votes	%	Votes	%
Liberal Democratic Party	Jun Mukōyama	108,229	55.29	78,655	40.21
Centrist Reform Alliance	Seiji Osaka	87,526	44.71	54,812	28.02
Democratic Party For the People				13,876	7.09
Sanseito				10,517	5.38
Japanese Communist Party				9,698	4.96
Team Mirai				7,959	4.07
Reiwa Shinsengumi				6,192	3.17
Nippon Ishin no Kai				5,573	2.85
Conservative Party of Japan				3,886	1.99
Tax Cuts Japan and Yukoku Alliance				2,239	1.14
Social Democratic Party				2,213	1.13
Total		195,755	100.00	195,620	100.00
Invalid/blank votes					
Voter turnout			59.29		
Registered voters		336,828		336,828	
LDP gain from CRA					

Hokkaido 9th district
Party	Candidate	Constituency		Proportional	
Party	Candidate	Votes	%	Votes	%
Liberal Democratic Party	Hideki Matsushita	87,984	43.11	73,022	35.83
Centrist Reform Alliance	Tatsumaru Yamaoka	81,063	39.72	54,514	26.75
Democratic Party For the People				17,127	8.40
Sanseito	Miho Kanno	22,900	11.22	14,774	7.25
Japanese Communist Party	Hiroshi Tatsuno	12,142	5.95	12,459	6.11
Team Mirai				8,928	4.38
Reiwa Shinsengumi				6,674	3.27
Nippon Ishin no Kai				6,615	3.25
Conservative Party of Japan				4,390	2.15
Social Democratic Party				2,719	1.33
Tax Cuts Japan and Yukoku Alliance				2,575	1.26
Total		204,089	100.00	203,797	100.00
Invalid/blank votes					
Voter turnout			57.75		
Registered voters		359,458		359,458	
LDP gain from CRA					

Hokkaido 10th district
Party	Candidate	Constituency		Proportional	
Party	Candidate	Votes	%	Votes	%
Centrist Reform Alliance	Hiroshi Kamiya	74,908	50.01	44,036	28.88
Liberal Democratic Party	Kōichi Watanabe	74,887	49.99	56,899	37.32
Democratic Party For the People				12,275	8.05
Sanseito				8,480	5.56
Japanese Communist Party				7,587	4.98
Team Mirai				6,392	4.19
Reiwa Shinsengumi				4,976	3.26
Nippon Ishin no Kai				4,690	3.08
Conservative Party of Japan				3,021	1.98
Social Democratic Party				2,315	1.52
Tax Cuts Japan and Yukoku Alliance				1,807	1.19
Total		149,795	100.00	152,478	100.00
Invalid/blank votes					
Voter turnout			60.01		
Registered voters		259,676		259,676	
CRA hold					

Hokkaido 11th district
Party	Candidate	Constituency		Proportional	
Party	Candidate	Votes	%	Votes	%
Liberal Democratic Party	Koichi Nakagawa	86,019	50.13	69,369	40.67
Centrist Reform Alliance	Kaori Ishikawa	72,951	42.52	41,899	24.57
Democratic Party For the People				13,721	8.04
Sanseito	Takashi Uto	12,613	7.35	11,022	6.46
Japanese Communist Party				8,718	5.11
Team Mirai				7,384	4.33
Nippon Ishin no Kai				5,263	3.09
Reiwa Shinsengumi				5,108	2.99
Conservative Party of Japan				3,622	2.12
Tax Cuts Japan and Yukoku Alliance				2,315	1.36
Social Democratic Party				2,135	1.25
Total		171,583	100.00	170,556	100.00
Invalid/blank votes					
Voter turnout			64.07		
Registered voters		271,981		271,981	
LDP gain from CRA					

Hokkaido 12th district
Party	Candidate	Constituency		Proportional	
Party	Candidate	Votes	%	Votes	%
Liberal Democratic Party	Arata Takebe	92,400	58.81	65,437	41.27
Centrist Reform Alliance	Eisei Kawaharada	64,719	41.19	38,330	24.17
Democratic Party For the People				13,031	8.22
Sanseito				9,882	6.23
Japanese Communist Party				7,293	4.60
Team Mirai				6,544	4.13
Reiwa Shinsengumi				5,246	3.31
Nippon Ishin no Kai				5,106	3.22
Conservative Party of Japan				3,445	2.17
Social Democratic Party				2,241	1.41
Tax Cuts Japan and Yukoku Alliance				2,009	1.27
Total		157,119	100.00	158,564	100.00
Invalid/blank votes					
Voter turnout			61.13		
Registered voters		265,083		265,083	
LDP hold					

== Proportional representation ==
Proportional representation results
Party	Votes	Seats	Rank	Elected member	Constituency	Ratio
LDP	911,742 (37.0%)	4	6	Yoshitaka Itō		
LDP	911,742 (37.0%)	4	7	Koichi Watanabe	Hokkaido 10th	99.9%
LDP	911,742 (37.0%)	4	14	Nagisa Muraki		
LDP	911,742 (37.0%)	4	15	Yuri Yoshida		
CRA	605,889 (24.6%)	3	1	Hidemachi Sato		
CRA	605,889 (24.6%)	3	2	Tomoko Ukishima		
CRA	605,889 (24.6%)	3	3	Tatsumaru Yamaoka	Hokkaido 9th	92.1%
DPFP	218,850 (8.9%)	1	1	Hidetake Usuki	Hokkaido 1st	25.8%

Liberal Democratic Party 911,742 (37.01%) 4 seats
Rank	Candidate	Constituency	Ratio
1	Hiroyuki Nakamura	Hokkaido 4th	Won
1	Kuniyoshi Azuma	Hokkaido 6th	Won
1	Takako Suzuki	Hokkaido 7th	Won
1	Jun Mukōyama	Hokkaido 8th	Won
1	Arata Takebe	Hokkaido 12th	Won
6	Yoshitaka Itō		
7	Takahiro Katō	Hokkaido 1st	Won
7	Yūsuke Takahashi	Hokkaido 2nd	Won
7	Hirohisa Takagi	Hokkaido 3rd	Won
7	Yoshiaki Wada	Hokkaido 5th	Won
7	Hideki Matsushita	Hokkaido 9th	Won
7	Koichi Nakagawa	Hokkaido 11th	Won
7	Kōichi Watanabe	Hokkaido 10th	99.9
14	Nagisa Muraki		
15	Yuri Yoshida		

Centrist Reform Alliance 605,889 (24.60%) 3 seats
Rank	Candidate	Constituency	Ratio
1	Hidemichi Satō		
2	Tomoko Ukishima		
3	Hiroshi Kamiya	Hokkaido 10th	Won
3	Tatsumaru Yamaoka	Hokkaido 9th	92.1
3	Kaori Ishikawa	Hokkaido 11th	84.8
3	Seiji Osaka	Hokkaido 8th	80.8
3	Kureha Otsuki	Hokkaido 4th	79.0
3	Maki Ikeda	Hokkaido 5th	73.8
3	Daiki Michishita	Hokkaido 1st	72.4
3	Yutaka Arai	Hokkaido 3rd	71.1
3	Kenko Matsuki	Hokkaido 2nd	71.0
3	Eisei Kawaharada	Hokkaido 12th	70.0
3	Masahito Nishikawa	Hokkaido 6th	65.9
3	Naoko Shinoda	Hokkaido 7th	52.1
15	Aisa Kudo		
16	Yoichi Tajima		
17	Tatsuyuki Hirokawa		

Democratic Party For the People 218,850 (8.88%) 1 seat
Rank	Candidate	Constituency	Ratio
1	Hidetake Usuki	Hokkaido 1st	25.8
2	Masaki Suzuki		

Sanseito 163,329 (6.63%) 0 seats
Rank	Candidate	Constituency	Ratio
1	Yoshiki Nakashima	Hokkaido 3rd	30.4
2	Ayako Nakada	Hokkaido 2nd	26.9

Team Mirai 134,613 (5.46%) 0 seats
Rank	Candidate	Constituency	Ratio
1	Muneyoshi Inahara		

Japanese Communist Party 134,084 (5.44%) 0 seats
Rank	Candidate	Constituency	Ratio
1	Kazuya Hatayama		

Nippon Ishin no Kai 93,966 (3.81%) 0 seats
Rank	Candidate	Constituency	Ratio
1	~~Izumi Yamazaki~~ (Note: Ineligible for election - failed to surpass the required 10% of votes in their single-member constituency race.)	Hokkaido 2nd	18.2
2	Miwako Okada		

Reiwa Shinsengumi 76,099 (3.09%) 0 seats
Rank	Candidate	Constituency	Ratio
1	Kazutaka Patason Nomura		

Conservative Party of Japan 60,119 (2.44%) 0 seats
Rank	Candidate	Constituency	Ratio
1	Masaru Onodera		

Tax Cuts Japan and Yukoku Alliance 32,878 (1.33%) 0 seats
Rank	Candidate	Constituency	Ratio
1	Shohei Kadowaki		

Social Democratic Party (Japan) 31,753 (1.29%) 0 seats
Rank	Candidate	Constituency	Ratio
1	Kazuyoshi Narumi		
