= 2024 Japanese general election in Hokkaido =

National election results in Hokkaidō, Japan

- 27 October 2024

All 20 seats to the House of Representatives
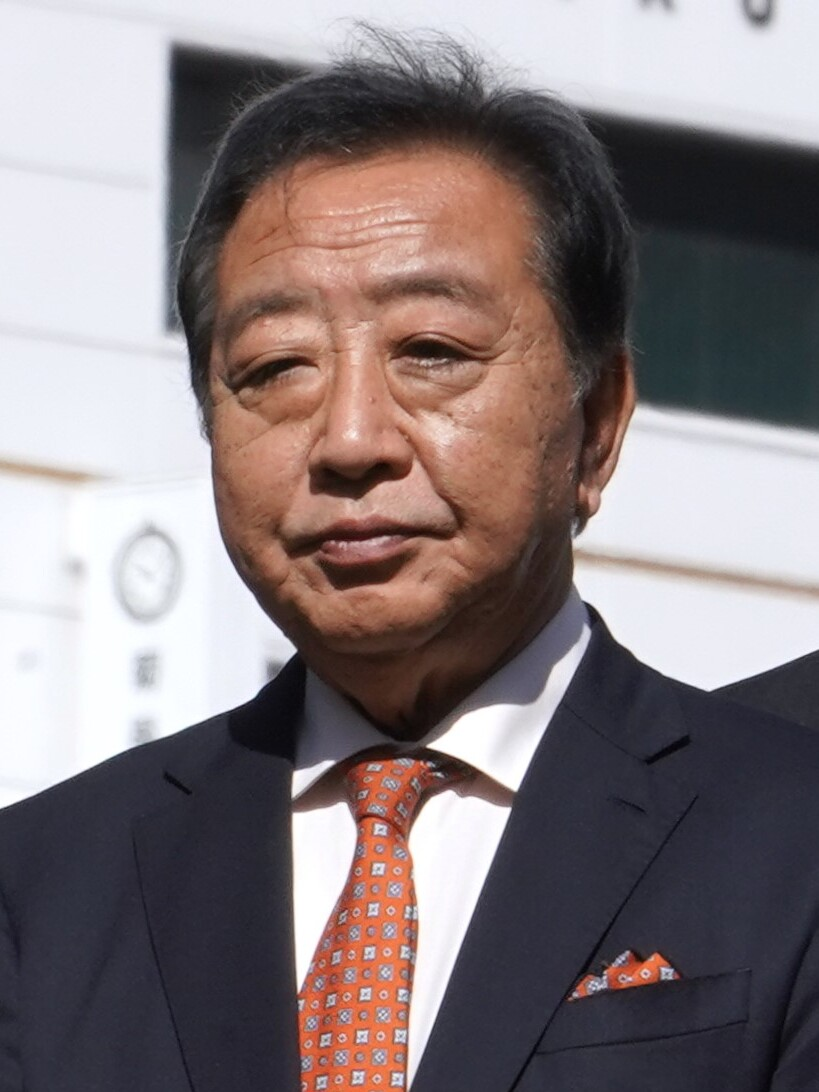

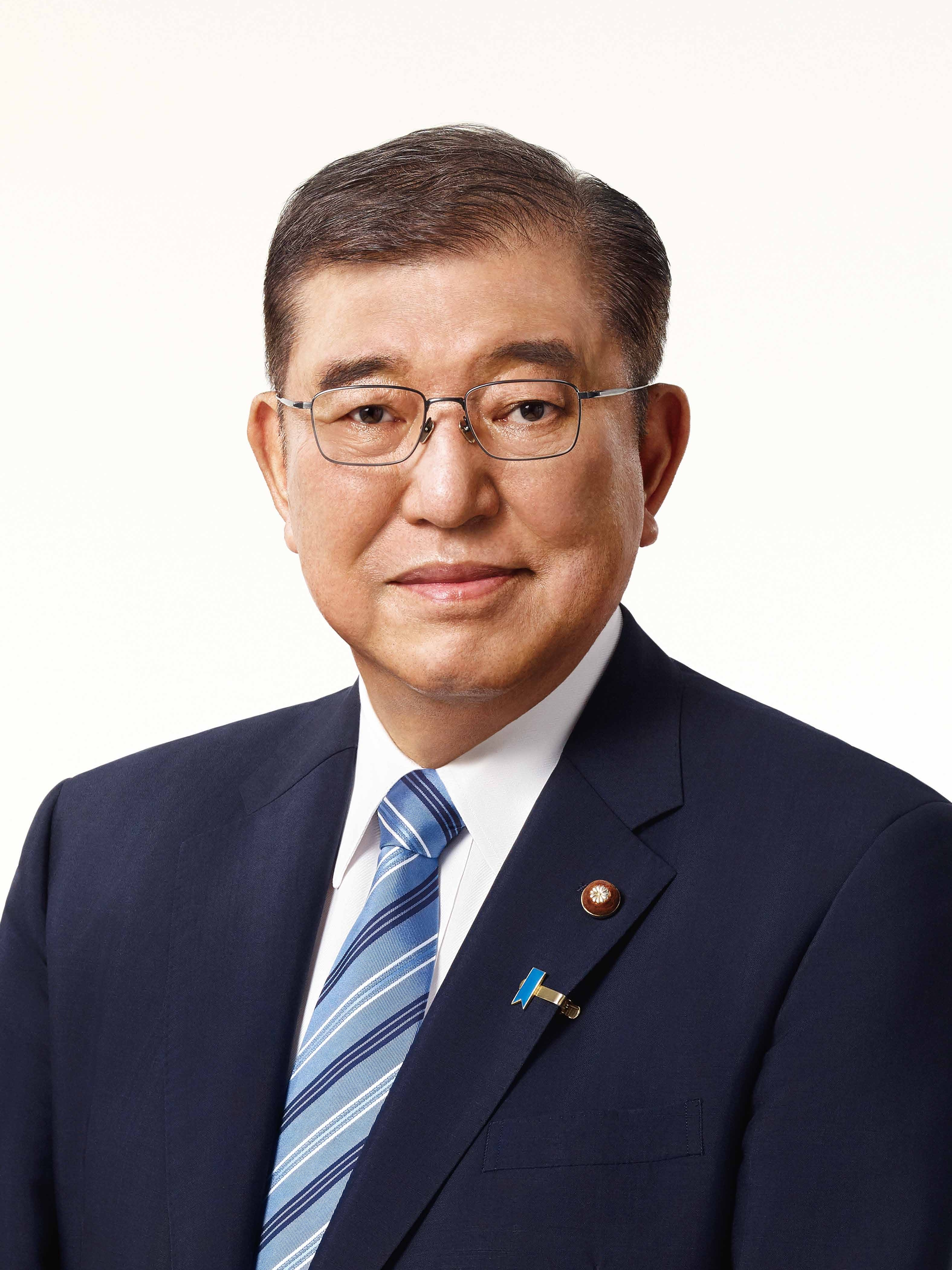

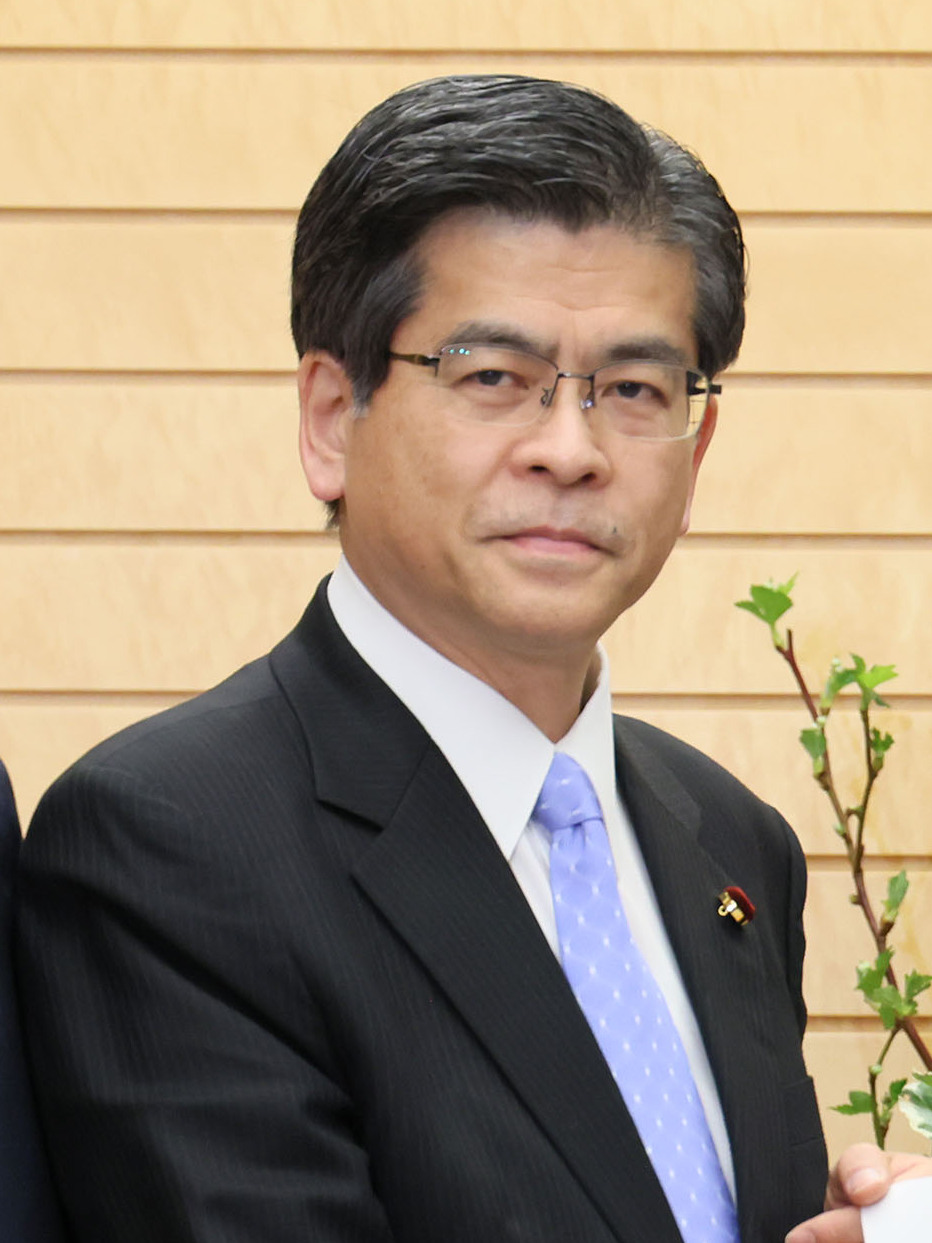

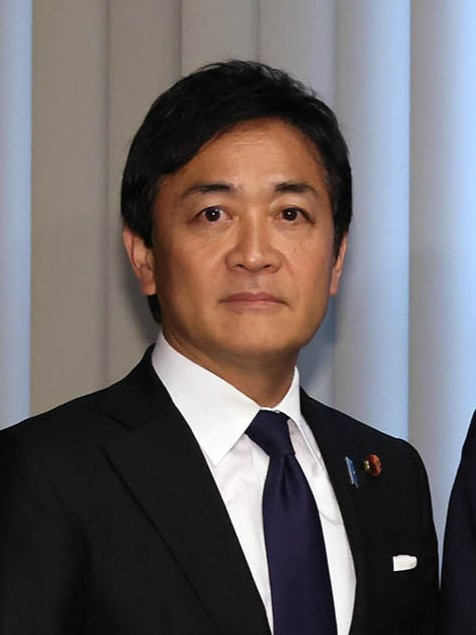
	Majority party	Minority party
Party	CDP	LDP
Last election	8 seats	10 seats
Constituency	9	3
Constituency vote	1,116,798; 46.8%	903,779; 37.9%
PR seats	3	3
Regional vote	694,578; 29.0%	641,127; 26.8%
Total	12	6
Seat change	▲4	▼4
	Third party	Fourth party
Party	Komeito	DPP
Last election	2 seats	0 seats
Constituency	0	0
Constituency vote	75,990; 3.2%	–
PR seats	1	1
Regional vote	253,344; 10.6%	192,303; 8.03%
Total	1	1
Seat change	▼1	▲1

This page contains the detailed results for the 2024 Japanese general election in the prefecture of Hokkaidō.

Within Hokkaidō there is the prefecture-wide Hokkaidō proportional block which elects 8 members by party list proportional representation. In addition to the block seats, Hokkaidō has 12 constituencies each electing a single member each by first past the post.

== Results summary ==
Party	Constituency			Proportional			Total seats	+/–
Party	Votes	%	Seats	Votes	%	Seats	Total seats	+/–
Constitutional Democratic Party	1,116,798	46.79	9	694,578	29.01	3	12	▲4
Liberal Democratic Party	903,779	37.86	3	641,127	26.78	3	6	▼4
Komeito	75,990	3.18	0	253,344	10.58	1	1	▼1
Democratic Party For the People	–	–	0	192,303	8.03	1	1	▲1
Reiwa Shinsengumi	–	–	0	177,620	7.42	0	0	±0
Japanese Communist Party	174,224	7.30	0	169,799	7.09	0	0	±0
Japan Innovation Party	73,875	3.09	0	96,954	4.05	0	0	±0
Conservative Party of Japan	–	–	0	61,903	2.59	0	0	New
Sanseito	20,097	0.84	0	57,002	2.38	0	0	New
Social Democratic Party	–	–	0	31,134	1.30	0	0	±0
Consideration the Euthanasia System	–	–	0	18,455	0.77	0	0	New
Independents	22,294	0.93	0				0	±0
Total	2,387,057	100.0	12	2,394,219	100.0	8	20	±0
Invalid/blank votes	68,205	2.78		60,706	2.47			
Total	2,455,362			2,454,925				
Registered voters/turnout	4,372,575	56.15		4,372,575	56.14			
Source: Ministry of Internal Affairs and Communications

== Single-member constituencies ==
=== Hokkaido Prefecture ===
Hokkaidō 1st
Party	Candidate	Votes	%	±%
CDP	Daiki Michishita	108,394	43.3	▼2.0
LDP	Takahiro Katō	80,133	32.0	▼9.0
JCP	Naoko Chiba	21,451	8.6	New
Sanseitō	Yoshihito Tanaka	20,097	8.0	New
Ishin	Satoru Kobayashi	20,000	8.0	▼5.7
Total votes		250,075	100.0	
Turnout			56.5	▼2.6
Registered electors		454,514		
CDP hold				

Hokkaidō 2nd
Party	Candidate	Votes	%	±%
CDP	Kenkō Matsuki	94,002	40.0	▼4.7
LDP	Yūsuke Takahashi	76,835	32.7	▼7.2
Ishin	Izumi Yamazaki	32,073	13.7	▼3.7
JCP	Shiori Miyauchi	31,855	13.6	New
Total votes		234,765	100.0	
Turnout			52.6	▲0.0
Registered electors		459,285		
CDP hold				

Hokkaidō 3rd
Party	Candidate	Votes	%	±%
CDP	Yutaka Arai	100,136	41.7	▼3.0
LDP	Hirohisa Takagi	83,089	34.6	▼8.4
JCP	Richiko Itō	22,915	9.6	New
Ishin	Yoshitaka Torikoshi	21,802	9.1	▼3.3
Independent	Kenji Masuda	11,972	5.0	New
Total votes		239,914	100.0	
Turnout			53.6	▼2.6
Registered electors		460,689		
CDP gain from LDP				

Hokkaidō 4th
Party	Candidate	Votes	%	±%
CDP	Kureha Otsuki	101,484	45.1	▼4.7
LDP	Hiroyuki Nakamura (elected by PR)	94,090	41.8	▼8.4
JCP	Akemi Sasaki	19,063	8.5	New
Independent	Kayo Saitō	10,322	4.6	New
Total votes		224,959	100.0	
Turnout			57.3	▼3.8
Registered electors		401,624		
CDP gain from LDP				

Hokkaidō 5th
Party	Candidate	Votes	%	±%
CDP	Maki Ikeda	125,444	51.7	▲11.4
LDP	Yoshiaki Wada	100,893	41.6	▼9.0
JCP	Ryūji Suzuki	16,399	6.8	▲0.7
Total votes		242,736	100.0	
Turnout			58.2	▼2.0
Registered electors		430,271		
CDP gain from LDP				

Hokkaidō 6th
Party	Candidate	Votes	%	±%
LDP	Kuniyoshi Azuma	100,694	46.9	▼8.6
CDP	Masahito Nishikawa (elected by PR)	94,193	43.9	▲3.6
JCP	Kazutoshi Ogiu	19,909	9.3	New
Total votes		214,796	100.0	
Turnout			55.3	▼1.6
Registered electors		399,796		
LDP hold				

Hokkaidō 7th
Party	Candidate	Votes	%	±%
LDP	Takako Suzuki	77,189	58.4	▲0.4
CDP	Naoko Shinoda (elected by PR)	54,888	41.6	▲8.9
Total votes		132,077	100.0	
Turnout			56.6	▲0.4
Registered electors		241,033		
LDP hold				

Hokkaidō 8th
Party	Candidate	Votes	%	±%
CDP	Seiji Osaka	97,758	50.8	▼1.9
LDP	Jun Mukōyama (elected by PR)	83,006	43.1	▼4.2
JCP	Katsumi Honma	11,708	6.1	New
Total votes		192,472	100.0	
Turnout			57.0	▼3.1
Registered electors		343,912		
CDP hold				

Hokkaidō 9th
Party	Candidate	Votes	%	±%
CDP	Tatsumaru Yamaoka	106,007	56.1	▲4.6
LDP	Hideki Matsushita	62,328	33.0	▼15.5
JCP	Hiroshi Tatsuno	20,557	10.9	New
Total votes		188,892	100.0	
Turnout			53.3	▼5.6
Registered electors		366,294		
CDP hold				

Hokkaidō 10th
Party	Candidate	Votes	%	±%
CDP	Hiroshi Kamiya	78,362	50.8	▲4.7
Komeito	Hisashi Inatsu	75,990	49.2	▼4.7
Total votes		154,352	100.0	
Turnout			59.9	▼4.9
Registered electors		267,329		
CDP gain from Komeito				

Hokkaidō 11th
Party	Candidate	Votes	%	±%
CDP	Kaori Ishikawa	84,522	52.2	▲0.4
LDP	Yūko Nakagawa	66,877	41.3	▼6.9
JCP	Kohei Sato	10,367	6.4	New
Total votes		161,766	100.0	
Turnout			59.9	▼3.6
Registered electors		275,871		
CDP hold				

Hokkaidō 12th
Party	Candidate	Votes	%	±%
LDP	Arata Takebe	78,645	52.3	▼6.1
CDP	Eisei Kawaharada (elected by PR)	71,608	47.7	▲14.6
Total votes		150,253	100.0	
Turnout			57.0	▼2.8
Registered electors		271,908		
LDP hold				
