= Manabu Horii =

Japanese speed skater and politician (born 1972)

- 堀井 学
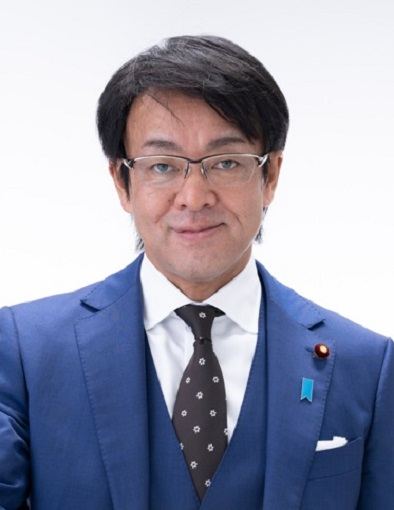
- Official portrait, 2023

Member of the House of Representatives
- In office 17 December 2012 – 28 August 2024
- Preceded by: Yukio Hatoyama
- Succeeded by: Yūsuke Takahashi
- Constituency: Hokkaido 9th (2012–2021); Hokkaido PR (2021–2024)

Member of the Hokkaido Legislative Assembly
- In office 8 April 2007 – 4 December 2012
- Constituency: Noboribetsu City

Personal details
- Born: 19 February 1972 (age 54) Muroran, Hokkaido, Japan
- Party: Independent
- Other party: Liberal Democratic
- Sports career
- Country: Japan
- Sport: Speed skating
Medal record
Olympic Games
Bronze medal – third place	1994 Lillehammer	500 m
World Single Distance Championships
Gold medal – first place	1997 Warsaw	500 m
World Sprint Championships
Bronze medal – third place	1996 Heerenveen	Sprint

Manabu Horii (堀井 学, Horii Manabu) (born February 19, 1972) is a former Japanese politician and speed skater. He won an Olympic bronze medal in 1994, and also competed in the 1998 and 2002 Olympics. He ended his speed skating career in 2002.

Horii represented Noboribetsu in the Hokkaido Legislative Assembly for the Liberal Democratic Party (LDP) from 2007 to 2012. In the 2012 general election of the House of Representatives, he was elected the as LDP candidate in Hokkaido 9th district seeking to succeed retiring Democrat Yukio Hatoyama. He was nominated in July 2012 when Hatoyama was still expected to run for re-election.

In July 2024, Horii left the LDP. On 28 August 2024, Horii resigned from the House of Representatives following a scandal over his giving out condolence money to constituents for funerals he did not personally attend in violation of election laws.

== World records ==
Event	Time	Date	Venue
1000 m	1:11.67	March 1, 1996	Olympic Oval, Calgary
Sprint combination	143.425	March 3, 1996	Olympic Oval, Calgary
1000 m	1:10.63	November 22, 1997	Olympic Oval, Calgary

Source: SpeedSkatingStats.com
