= Kenji Yamaoka =

Japanese politician (born 1943)

- 山岡 賢次
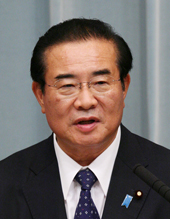
- Yamaoka in 2011

Chairman of the National Public Safety Commission
- In office 2 September 2011 – 13 January 2012
- Prime Minister: Yoshihiko Noda
- Preceded by: Kansei Nakano
- Succeeded by: Jin Matsubara

Member of the House of Representatives
- In office 25 June 2000 – 16 November 2012
- Preceded by: Multi-member district
- Succeeded by: Tsutomu Sato
- Constituency: Northern Kanto PR (2000–2009); Tochigi 4th (2009–2012)
- In office 18 July 1993 – 27 September 1996
- Preceded by: Multi-member district
- Succeeded by: Constituency abolished
- Constituency: Tochigi 2nd

Member of the House of Councillors
- In office 10 July 1983 – 16 July 1993
- Preceded by: Constituency established
- Succeeded by: Chikage Oogi
- Constituency: National PR

Personal details
- Born: 25 April 1943 (age 83) Tochigi Prefecture, Japan
- Party: Democratic (2003–2012)
- Other political affiliations: LDP (1983–1993); JRP (1993–1994); NFP (1994–1998); LP (1998–2003); PLF (2012); TPJ (2012–2013); PLP (2013–2019)
- Children: Tatsumaru Yamaoka
- Education: Keio University

Kenji Yamaoka (山岡 賢次, Yamaoka Kenji; born 25 April 1943) is a former Japanese politician of the Democratic Party of Japan (DPJ), who served as a member of the House of Councillors and the House of Representatives in the Diet (national legislature).

== Overview ==
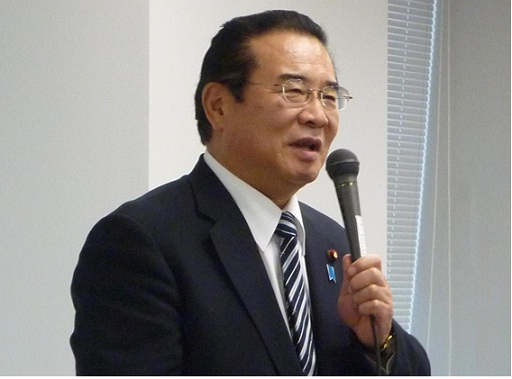
Yamaoka at the Sanno Park Tower (on 5 January 2012)

A native of Oyama, Tochigi and graduate of Keio University, he was elected to the first of two terms in the House of Councillors in 1983 and then to the House of Representatives for the first time in 1993. After losing his seat in 1996 as a member of the New Frontier Party, he was re-elected in 2000 as a member of the Liberal Democratic Party (LDP). He later joined the DPJ. He married the daughter of writer Sōhachi Yamaoka and was adopted into the family.

In September 2011 he was appointed as chairman of the National Public Safety Commission, Minister of State for Consumer Affairs and Food Safety and Minister for the Abduction Issue. in the cabinet of newly appointed Prime Minister Yoshihiko Noda.

In December 2011 he was the subject of a censure motion from the opposition LDP for failing to declare receiving ¥450,000 from a health food company allegedly involved in a pyramid scheme in 2008, and ¥2.54 million from other organizations involved in pyramid schemes between 2005 and 2008. As consumer affairs chief he was responsible for the Consumer Affairs Agency, which among other things is responsible for protecting consumers against pyramid schemes. Yamaoka said he has returned all the money to the donors. In the cabinet reshuffle of 13 January 2012 he was replaced in both of his cabinet roles by Jin Matsubara.

Yamaoka's son is Tatsumaru Yamaoka, a Diet member running in the Hokkaido 9th district of the House of Representatives.
