= Takahiro Katō =

Japanese politician

- 加藤 貴弘
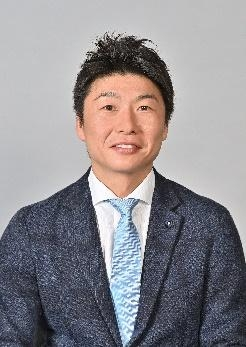
- Official portrait, 2023

Member of the House of Representatives
- Incumbent
- Assumed office 9 February 2026
- Preceded by: Daiki Michishita
- Constituency: Hokkaido 1st

Member of the Hokkaido Legislative Assembly
- In office 12 April 2015 – 29 March 2024
- Constituency: Nishi Ward, Sapporo

Personal details
- Born: 22 January 1983 (age 43) Bibai, Hokkaido, Japan
- Party: Liberal Democratic
- Website: Takahiro Katō website

Takahiro Katō (加藤 貴弘, Katō Takahiro; born 22 January 1983) is a Japanese politician of the Liberal Democratic Party, who serves as a member of the House of Representatives.

== Early years ==
On 22 January 1983, Katō was born in Bibai, Hokkaido. After graduating from Yuho High School, he worked for a telecommunications equipment sales company and an advertising agency. Later, he established a bakery production and sales company.

== Political career ==
In 2015, Katō ran for the Hokkaido Legislative Assembly and won.

In 2019, he was re-elected and secured his second-term.

In 2023, he was re-elected and secured his third-term.

On 29 March 2024, he resigned from the Hokkaido Legislative Assembly to run in the next general election. In the 2024 general election, he lost to CDP incumbent Daiki Michishita.

In the 2026 general election, he defeated CRA incumbent Michishita.
