= Yūsuke Takahashi =

Japanese politician

- 高橋 祐介
- Official portrait, 2026

Member of the House of Representatives
- Incumbent
- Assumed office 9 February 2026
- Preceded by: Kenko Matsuki
- Constituency: Hokkaido 2nd
- In office 19 September 2024 – 9 October 2024
- Preceded by: Manabu Horii
- Succeeded by: Multi-member district
- Constituency: Hokkaido PR

Personal details
- Born: 12 September 1980 (age 46) Sapporo, Hokkaido, Japan
- Party: Liberal Democratic
- Education: Nihon University
- Website: Yūsuke Takahashi website

Yūsuke Takahashi (高橋 祐介, Takahashi Yūsuke; born 12 September 1980) is a Japanese politician of the Liberal Democratic Party, who serves as a member of the House of Representatives.

== Early years ==
On 12 September 1980, Takahashi was born in Higashi ward, Sapporo, Hokkaido. After graduating from Nihon University's College of Economy, he served as a secretary to Takashi Nagao.

== Political career ==
On 4 June 2021, the LDP nominated Takahashi as a candidate for Hokkaido 2nd district.

In the 2021 general election, he lost to CDP incumbent Kenko Matsuki.

On 30 August 2024, Manabu Horii, who was elected for Hokkaido PR, resigned as a member of the House of Representatives to take responsibility for violating the Public Offices Election Act. As a result, his seat was to be filled by a runner-up from the LDP party-list for the Hokkaido proportional representation block in the 2021 general election. However, the first runner-up, Toshimitsu Funahashi, had been elected to the House of Councillors in the 2022 House of Councillors election, and the second runner-up, Kazuo Maeda, had become a member of the Hokkaido Legislative Assembly in the 2023 Hokkaido Legislative election. Consequently, Takahashi, who was next on the party-list, secured the seat.

Following the dissolution of the House of Representatives on 9 October, Takahashi lost his seat. His tenure as a member of the House of Representatives lasted a mere 21 days. In the 2024 general election, he lost to CDP's Matsuki again.

In the 2026 general election, he defeated CRA's Matsuki.
