= Daiki Michishita =

Japanese politician

- 道下 大樹
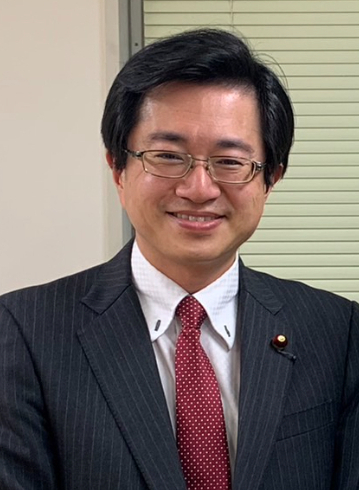
- Michishita in 2023

Member of the House of Representatives
- In office 26 October 2017 – 23 January 2026
- Preceded by: Takahiro Yokomichi
- Succeeded by: Takarō Katō
- Constituency: Hokkaido 1st

Member of the Hokkaido Legislative Assembly
- In office 9 April 2007 – 26 September 2017
- Constituency: Nishi Ward

Personal details
- Born: 24 December 1975 (age 50) Shintoku, Hokkaido, Japan
- Party: CRA (since 2026)
- Other political affiliations: DPJ (2007–2016); DP (2016–2017); CDP (2017–2026)
- Education: Chuo University
- Website: michishita-daiki.jp

Daiki Michishita (道下 大樹, Michishita Daiki; born 24 December 1975) is a Japanese former politician of the Constitutional Democratic Party of Japan who served as a member of the House of Representatives in the Diet (national legislature).

== Biography ==
A native of Shintoku, Hokkaido and a graduate of Chuo University, he was elected to the House of Representatives for the first time in 2017 after having served in the Hokkaido Prefectural Assembly for three terms. Michishita was elected in the Hokkaido 1st district, succeeding longtime representative and former Governor of Hokkaido, Takahiro Yokomichi. He started his career as a secretary in Yokomichi's Sapporo office back in 1998.
