= Naoko Shinoda =

Japanese female lawyer and politician (1972-)

- 篠田 奈保子

Member of the House of Representatives
- In office November 1, 2024 – January 23, 2026
- Constituency: Hokkaido PR

Personal details
- Born: February 5, 1972 (age 54) Kiyosato, Hokkaido, Japan
- Party: CRA (since 2026)
- Other political affiliations: CDP (2019–2026)
- Children: 4
- Education: Faculty of Law, Hokkaido University
- Occupation: Lawyer and Politician

Naoko Shinoda (篠田 奈保子) (married surname: Nakagawa (中川) (born February 5, 1972) is a Japanese politician and lawyer. She is a former member of the House of Representatives and member of the Constitutional Democratic Party of Japan.

== Early life ==
Shinoda was born in Kiyosato, Shari District, Hokkaido, on February 5, 1972. She is the second daughter of six children in a family that ran a photography studio, and grew up in a large family of ten people, including her grandparents.

After graduating from Kiyosato Elementary School, Kiyosato Junior High School, and Hokkaido Kiyosato High School, he studied for two years as a ronin before entering the Faculty of Law at Hokkaido University. After graduating, she registered as a lawyer in 1999.

== Career ==
After working at the Saito Michitoshi Law Office in Obihiro, Tokyo Public Law Office, and in 2008 at the Legal Support Center Kushiro Law Office, she now runs the Harutori Law Office in Kushiro together with her lawyer spouse.

In June 2019, it was decided that she would run for the Constitutional Democratic Party in the Hokkaido 7th district in the next general election. In the 49th general election for the House of Representatives on October 31, 2021, she ran as a candidate in the Hokkaido 7th district with the Constitutional Democratic Party's endorsement, but lost to Yoshitaka Ito of the Liberal Democratic Party, finishing in 7th place in terms of narrow defeat percentage, and was defeated without even reaching the 3 seats secured by the Constitutional Democratic Party in the Hokkaido proportional representation block.

In the 50th general election for the House of Representatives on October 27, 2024, she ran again in the Hokkaido 7th district, losing to Takako Suzuki of the Liberal Democratic Party. However, she was re-elected in the Hokkaido proportional representation block and won for the first time. Although she was listed in the first place in the proportional representation block along with Maki Ikeda as a preferential treatment for women (other candidates were ranked third), it did not affect the outcome of the election, as the Constitutional Democratic Party secured three proportional representation seats while three other candidates lost.

She is a mother of four children. She also served as a member of the Japan Federation of Bar Associations Poverty Issues Headquarters, the representative director of the Hokkaido Safety Net Council, and a member of various councils in Kushiro.

== Elections ==
House of Representatives (Japan)
| Preceded by | Member of the House of Representatives for Hokkaido proportional representation block 2024–present | Incumbent |
