= Hideki Matsushita =

Japanese politician (born 1990)

- 松下 英樹

Member of the House of Representatives
- Incumbent
- Assumed office 9 February 2026
- Preceded by: Tatsumaru Yamaoka
- Constituency: Hokkaido 9th

Personal details
- Born: 6 September 1990 (age 35) Hiroshima, Japan
- Party: Liberal Democratic (Shikōkai)

Hideki Matsushita (松下英樹, Matsushita Hideki; born 6 September 1990) is a Japanese politician serving as a member of the House of Representatives since 2026. He previously worked at MUFG Bank and Mitsubishi UFJ Securities, and founded a management consulting firm and a tourism company.
