= Kuniyoshi Azuma =

Japanese politician

- 東 国幹
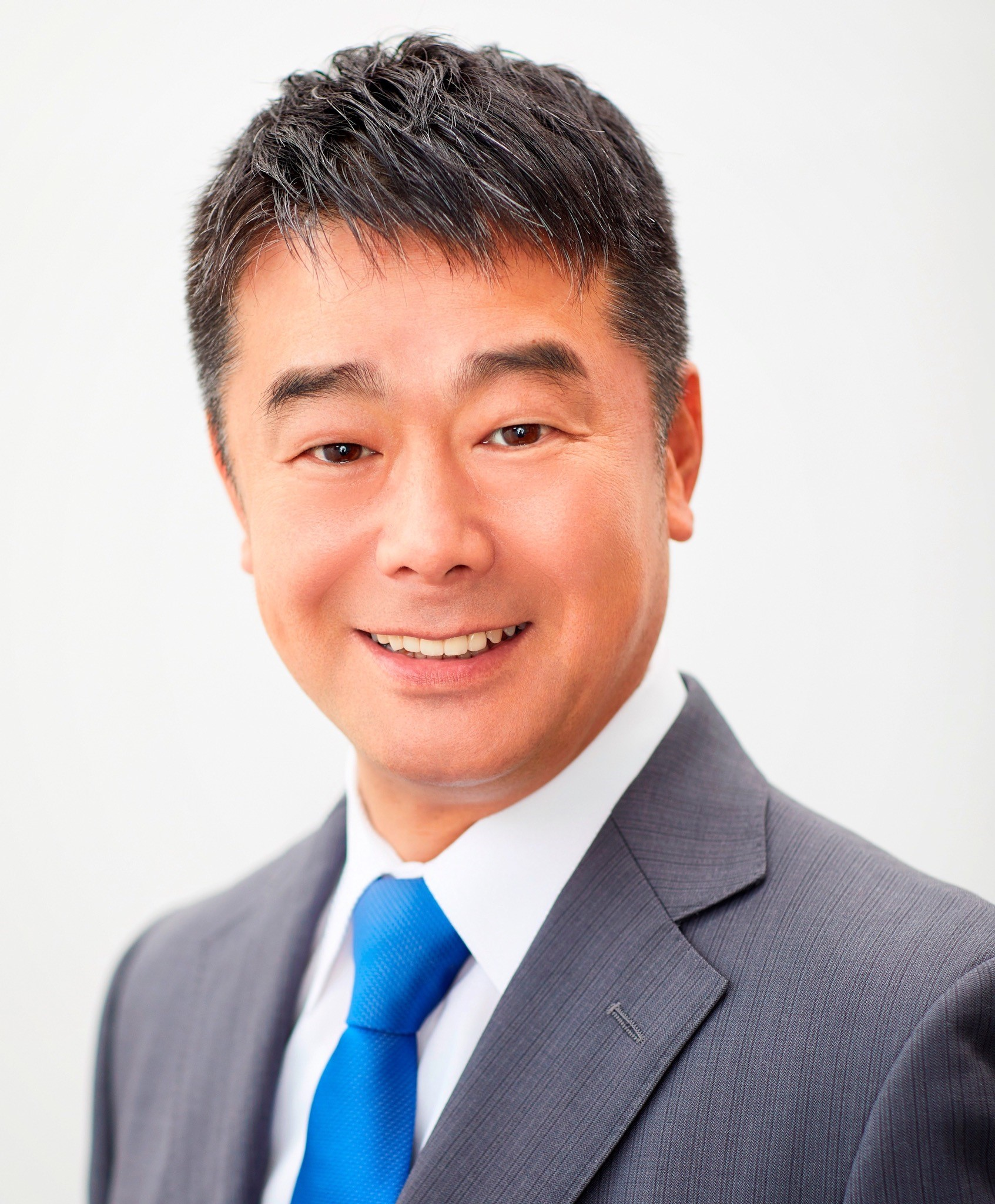
- Official portrait, 2024

Member of the House of Representatives
- Incumbent
- Assumed office 1 November 2021
- Preceded by: Takahiro Sasaki
- Constituency: Hokkaido 6th

Member of the Hokkaido Legislative Assembly
- In office 30 April 2015 – 30 April 2021
- Constituency: Asahikawa
- In office 30 April 2007 – 2014
- Constituency: Asahikawa
- In office 30 April 1999 – 2002
- Constituency: Asahikawa

Member of the Asahikawa City Council
- In office 1995–1999

Personal details
- Born: 17 February 1968 (age 58) Nayoro, Hokkaido, Japan
- Party: Liberal Democratic
- Education: Tokai University
- Website: Kuniyoshi Azuma website

Kuniyoshi Azuma (東 国幹, Kuniyoshi Azuma; born 17 February 1968) is a Japanese politician of the Liberal Democratic Party, who serves as a member of the House of Representatives.

== Early years ==
Azuma was born in Nayoro, Hokkaido, in 1968.

After graduating from Tokai University's Faculty of Law, he became a secretary to Shizuo Sato, member of the House of Representatives.

== Political career ==
In 1995, Azuma ran for the Asahikawa City Council and was elected.

In 1999, Azuma ran for the Hokkaido Legislative Assembly.

In 2002, Azuma resigned as a member of the Hokkaido Legislative Assembly and ran for the mayor of Asahikawa but lost.

In 2007, Azuma ran for the Hokkaido Legislative Assembly and was elected.

In 2014, Azuma resigned as a member of the Hokkaido Legislative Assembly and ran for the mayor of Asahikawa again. As a result, he lost to incumbent Masahito Nishikawa.

In the 2014 Japanese general election, Azuma ran for Hokkaido PR but could not win a seat in Hokkaido PR.

In 2015, Azuma ran for the Hokkaido Legislative Assembly and was elected.

In the 2021 general election, Azuma resigned as a member of the Hokkaido Legislative Assembly and ran for Hokkaido 6th district. He defeated Nishikawa who he lost to in the 2014 Asahikawa mayoral election and gain Hokkaido 6th's seat.

In the 2024 LDP presidential election, Azuma endorsed Toshimitsu Motegi as a recommender.

In the 2024 general election, Azuma defeated Nishikawa again after a close race. After the election, he was appointed to Parliamentary Secretary for Finance in the Second Ishiba cabinet.

In the 2025 LDP presidential election, Azuma endorsed Motegi as a recommender again.

In the 2026 general election, Azuma defeated CRA's Nishikawa.
