= Tomoko Ukishima =

Japanese politician

- 浮島 智子
- Official portrait, 2013

Member of the House of Representatives
- Incumbent
- Assumed office 21 December 2012
- Constituency: Kinki PR (2012–2026); Hokkaido PR (2026–present)

Member of the House of Councillors
- In office 26 July 2004 – 25 July 2010
- Constituency: National PR

Personal details
- Born: 1 February 1963 (age 63) Shinjuku, Tokyo, Japan
- Party: Komeito (2004–2026; 2026–present)
- Other political affiliations: CRA (2026)

Tomoko Ukishima (浮島 智子, Ukishima Tomoko; born 1 February 1963) is a Japanese politician who serves in the House of Representatives as a member of the Komeito Party. She was previously in the House of Councillors.

== Early life ==
Ukishima was born in Shinjuku Ward in Tokyo. As a professional Ballet dancer she became the Principal dancer in the Hong Kong Ballet company in 1984 and in the Dayton Ballet company in 1995. She was elected to the Diet for the first time in 2004.

== Political career ==
She has held various positions, including a State Secretary in the Ministry of Education, Culture, Sports, Science and Technology, and State Secretary in the Cabinet Office, where she also served as State Secretary for the Environment.

Additionally, she has been Deputy Minister in the Cabinet Office and Deputy Minister of Education, Culture, Sports, Science and Technology, as well as Chairman of the House of Representatives' Committee on General Affairs.
