= Hokkaido 1st district =

Japan House of Representatives constituency

Hokkaidō 1st District
- Parliamentary constituency for the Japanese House of Representatives
- Numbered map of Hokkaidō Prefecture single-member districts

- Sapporo-area detail
- Prefecture: Hokkaidō
- Proportional District: Hokkaidō
- Electorate: 450,946 (2021)

Current constituency
- Created: 1994
- Seats: One
- Party: LDP
- Representative: Takahiro Katō
- Created from: Hokkaido 1st district (1947–1993)
- Municipalities: Sapporo's Chūō Ward, Minami Ward, and portions of other wards

Hokkaidō 1st district (北海道[第]1区, Hokkaidō-[dai-]ikku) is a single-member constituency of the House of Representatives, the lower house of the national Diet of Japan. It is located in Sapporo, the prefectural capital of Hokkaido. In 2017, its border were redrawn and it now consists of Sapporo's Chūō ("Centre") and Minami ("South") wards, a portion of Nishi ("West") ward as well as a small part of Kita ("North") ward.

Since 2017, the district has been represented by Daiki Michishita of the CDP. This seat was almost continuously held by former Hokkaidō governor Takahiro Yokomichi between 1996 and 2017, except for a brief period from 2012 to 2014. Yokomichi was the leader of the ex-Socialist faction within the Democratic Party and Speaker of the House of Representatives from 2009 to 2012. Before the 1994 House of Representatives electoral reform, Sapporo city had been part of the six-member 1st district that covered Ishikari and Shiribetsu subprefectures. Yokomichi and previously his father Setsuo had represented the pre-reform multi-member 1st district for the Socialists from 1952 until the 1983 gubernatorial election, interrupted by two years after Setsuo Yokomichi's death in 1967. In the 2009 general election, Yokomichi's main challenger was LDP's Gaku Hasegawa, who lost the race and also failed to win a proportional seat, but went on to become Councillor for Hokkaidō in 2010. In 2005, Muneo Suzuki's regionalist New Party Daichi nominated ski jumper Masahiro Akimoto in the district. In 2000, former Olympic weightlifter and current Hokkaidō assemblyman Nobuyuki Hatta ran unsuccessfully as a candidate for Ichirō Ozawa's Liberal Party. In 2012, Olympic speed skater Hiroyasu Shimizu ran for the district as a member of the New Party Daichi – True Democrats. Yokomichi lost the seat in the 2012 election to Toshimitsu Funahashi of the LDP but regained it in 2014. He stepped down in 2017.

== List of representatives ==
Representative	Party	Dates	Notes
Takahiro Yokomichi	DPJ	1996 – 2012	
Toshimitsu Funabashi	LDP	2012 – 2014	
Takahiro Yokomichi	DPJ	2014 – 2016	
Takahiro Yokomichi	DP	2016 – 2017	
Daiki Michishita	CDP	2017 – 2026	
Takahiro Katō	LDP	2026 – present	Incumbent

== Election results ==
2026
Party	Candidate	Votes	%	±%
LDP	Takahiro Katō	112,618	43.6	▲11.6
Centrist Reform	Daiki Michishita	81,560	31.6	▼11.7
DPP	Hidetake Usuki (elected by PR)	29,134	11.3	New
Sanseitō	Chizuko Kano	22,024	8.5	▲0.5
JCP	Eiji Mori	12,906	5.0	▼3.6
Registered electors		453,829		
Turnout			57.96	▲1.48
LDP gain from Centrist Reform				

2024
Party	Candidate	Votes	%	±%
CDP	Daiki Michishita	108,394	43.3	▼2.0
LDP	Takahiro Katō	80,133	32.0	▼9.0
JCP	Naoko Chiba	21,451	8.6	New
Sanseitō	Yoshihito Tanaka	20,097	8.0	New
Ishin	Satoru Kobayashi	20,000	8.0	▼5.7
Turnout			56.48	▼2.65
CDP hold				

2021
Party	Candidate	Votes	%	±%
CDP	Daiki Michishita	118,286	45.33	▼8.15
LDP	Toshimitsu Funahashi	106,985	41.00	▼5.52
Ishin	Satoru Kobayashi	35,652	13.66	
Majority			4.33	▼2.64
Turnout			59.13	▼1.14
CDP hold		Swing	▼1.34	

2017
Party	Candidate	Votes	%	±%
CDP	Daiki Michishita (Note: The CDP is the successor party of the DP in this district, therefore the voting figures of the DP incumbent are used as a reference.)	139,110	53.48	▲10.01
LDP (Komeito)	Toshimitsu Funahashi (endorsed by NPD)	120,987	46.52	▲6.97
Majority		18,123	6.96	▲2.74
Turnout			60.27	▲4.04
CDP hold		Swing	▲1.52	

2014
Party	Candidate	Votes	%	±%
Democratic	Takahiro Yokomichi	116,398	43.47	▲14.58
LDP (Komeito)	Toshimitsu Funahashi	105,918	39.55	▲8.88
JCP	Hiroyuki Norota	32,031	11.96	▲4.98
Independent	Yoshihiro Īda	13,444	5.02	N/A
Majority		10,480	3.92	▲1.74
Turnout			56.23	▼2.48
Democratic gain from LDP		Swing	▲2.85	

2012
Party	Candidate	Votes	%	±%
LDP (Komeito)	Toshimitsu Funahashi	86,034	31.07	▼9.73
Democratic (People's New)	Takahiro Yokomichi (elected by PR)	79,994	28.89	▼17.41
Restoration (Your)	Tomokazu Ōtake	46,681	16.86	New
NP-Daichi (Tomorrow)	Hiroyasu Shimizu	44,845	16.20	New
JCP	Hiroyuki Norota	19,340	6.98	▼0.62
Turnout			56.23	
LDP gain from Democratic				

2009
Party	Candidate	Votes	%	±%
Democratic (People's New)	Takahiro Yokomichi	183,216	51.9	
LDP (Komeito)	Gaku Hasegawa	124,343	36.8	
JCP	Hideaki Matsui	25,803	7.6	
Happiness Realization	Kazue Takamoto	4,083	1.2	
Turnout		342,870	72.1	
Democratic hold				

2005
Party	Candidate	Votes	%	±%
Democratic	Takahiro Yokomichi	143,564	45.7	
LDP	Takayuki Mishina	128,166	40.8	
JCP	Hiroko Yokoyama	25,481	8.1	
NP-Daichi	Masahiro Akimoto	16,698	5.3	
Turnout		319,360	69.3	
Democratic hold				

2003
Party	Candidate	Votes	%	±%
Democratic (Social Democratic)	Takahiro Yokomichi	143,907	55.4	
LDP	Takayuki Mishina	89,758	34.6	
JCP	Hiroko Yokoyama	25,995	10.0	
Turnout		266,485	59.1	
Democratic hold				

2000
Party	Candidate	Votes	%	±%
Democratic	Takahiro Yokomichi	132,514	50.7	
LDP (New Conservative)	Yoshitaka Kimoto	76,047	29.1	
JCP	Teizō Komura	32,267	12.3	
Liberal	Nobuyuki Hatta	20,554	7.9	
Turnout			61.85	
Democratic hold				

1996
Party	Candidate	Votes	%	±%
Democratic	Takahiro Yokomichi	102,577	45.9	
LDP	Eiichi Masugi	56,265	25.2	
JCP	Teizō Komura	32,703	14.6	
Independent	Gaku Hasegawa	32,019	14.3	
Turnout		233,995	56.7	
Democratic win (new seat)				
