= Nagisa Muraki =

Japanese politician (born 2000)

- 村木 汀
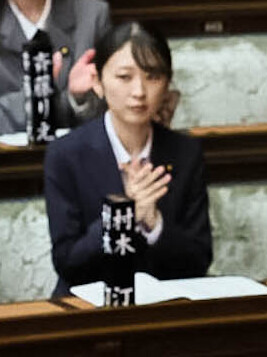
- Muraki in 2026

Member of the House of Representatives
- Incumbent
- Assumed office 8 February 2026
- Preceded by: Multi-member district
- Constituency: Hokkaido PR

Personal details
- Born: 14 February 2000 (age 26) Iwamizawa, Hokkaido, Japan
- Party: Liberal Democratic (Shikōkai)
- Education: Hokkai Gakuen University

Nagisa Muraki (村木汀, Muraki Nagisa; born 14 February 2000) is a Japanese politician serving as a member of the House of Representatives since 2026. She was the youngest member elected in the 2026 general election.
