= Hidetake Usuki =

Japanese politician (born 1981)

- 臼木 秀剛
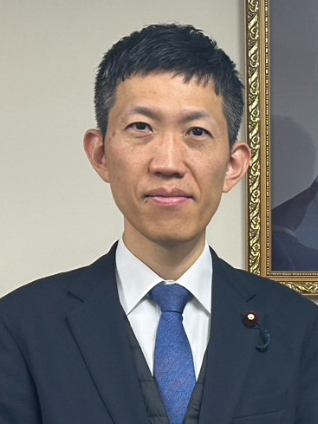
- Usuki in 2024

Member of the House of Representatives
- Incumbent
- Assumed office 1 November 2024
- Constituency: Hokkaido PR

Personal details
- Born: 28 March 1981 (age 45) Hyōgo Prefecture, Japan
- Party: DPP
- Education: Shinshu University; Niigata University

Hidetake Usuki (臼木秀剛, Usuki Hidetake; born 28 March 1981) is a Japanese politician serving as a member of the House of Representatives since 2024. In the 2022 House of Councillors election, he was a candidate for the House of Councillors.
