= Hokkaido 6th district =

Japan House of Representatives constituency

Hokkaido 6th District
- Parliamentary constituency for the Japanese House of Representatives
- Numbered map of Hokkaido Prefecture single-member districts
- Prefecture: Hokkaido
- Proportional District: Hokkaido
- Electorate: 392,868(2026)

Current constituency
- Seats: One
- Party: LDP
- Representative: Kuniyoshi Azuma
- Created from: Hokkaido's 2nd medium sized district
- Subprefecture: Kamikawa

Hokkaidō 6th district (北海道[第]6区) is a single-member electoral district for the House of Representatives, the lower house of the National Diet of Japan. It is located in the prefecture (-dō) of Hokkaidō and consists of Hokkaido's Kamikawa Subprefecture.

The CDP lost the seat in the 2021 elections by large margins. The CDP candidate was Masahito Nishikawa the former mayor of Asahikawa, by far the biggest city in the constituency. After the death of a young girl caused by bullying and the city being badly affected by the COVID-19 pandemic Nishikawa's decision to go into national politics faced heavy criticism and he was seen as avoiding responsibility.

== List of representatives ==
Representative	Party	Dates	Notes
Hidenori Sasaki	DPJ	1996 – 2003	
Hiroshi Imazu	LDP	2003 – 2005	
Takahiro Sasaki	DPJ	2005 – 2012	
Hiroshi Imazu	LDP	2012 – 2014	
Takahiro Sasaki	DPJ	2014 – 2016	
Takahiro Sasaki	DP	2016 – 2017	
Takahiro Sasaki	CDP	2017 – 2021	
Kuniyoshi Azuma	LDP	2021 –	

== Recent results ==
2026
Party	Candidate	Votes	%	±%
LDP	Kuniyoshi Azuma	121,276	56.1	▲9.2
Centrist Reform	Masahito Nishikawa	79,954	37.0	▼6.9
JCP	Kazutoshi Ogiu	14,978	6.9	▼2.4
Majority		6,501	19.1	▼36.2
Turnout		216,208	56.54	▲1.24
Registered electors		392,868		
LDP hold				

2024
Party	Candidate	Votes	%	±%
LDP	Kuniyoshi Azuma	100,694	46.9	▼8.6
CDP	Masahito Nishikawa (won PR seat)	94,193	43.9	▲3.61
JCP	Kazutoshi Ogiu	19,909	9.3	new
Majority		6,501	3	▼12.21
Turnout		214,796	55.30	▼1.56
Registered electors		399,833		▼3.66
LDP hold				

2021
Party	Candidate	Votes	%	±%
LDP	Kuniyoshi Azuma	128,670	55.50	▲9.99
CDP	Masahito Nishikawa	93,403	40.29	▼14.20
Anti-NHK	Tadayuki Saitō	5,630	4.13	
Majority			15.21	
Turnout			56.86	▼2.62
LDP gain from CDP		Swing	12.1	

2017
Party	Candidate	Votes	%	±%
CDP	Takahiro Sasaki	136,312	54.49	▲9.19
LDP	Hiroshi Imazu	113,851	45.51	▲1.41
CDP hold		Swing	▲9.19	

2014
Party	Candidate	Votes	%	±%
Democratic	Takahiro Sasaki	104,595	45.3	▲16.4
LDP	Hiroshi Imazu (won PR seat)	101,748	44.1	▲1.2
JCP	Kazutoshi Ogyu	24,656	10.6	▲2.7
Democratic gain from LDP		Swing	▲7.6	

2012
Party	Candidate	Votes	%	±%
LDP	Hiroshi Imazu	103,064	42.9	▲5.1
Democratic	Takahiro Sasaki	69,272	28.9	▼26.5
Your	Takanobu Azumi	48,736	20.3	N/A
JCP	Kazutoshi Ogyu	18,915	7.9	▲2.3
LDP gain from Democratic		Swing	▲15.8	

2009
Party	Candidate	Votes	%	±%
Democratic	Takahiro Sasaki	175,879	55.4	▲8.7
LDP	Hiroshi Imazu	119,964	37.8	▼8.0
JCP	Kazutoshi Ogyu	17,884	5.6	▼2.0
Happiness Realization	Shinichi Takeda	3.554	1.1	N/A
Democratic hold		Swing	▲8.4	

2005
Party	Candidate	Votes	%	±%
Democratic	Takahiro Sasaki	143,860	46.7	
LDP	Hideyuki Kaneda	141,099	45.8	
JCP	Hachiro Tanabe	23,343	7.6	
Democratic gain from LDP		Swing		

2003
Party	Candidate	Votes	%	±%
LDP	Hiroshi Imazu	112,270	40.16	
Democratic	Takahiro Sasaki	111,656	39.94	
Independent	Masahito Nishikawa	37,518	13.42	
JCP	Yoshinori Nakano	18,144	6.49	
LDP gain from Democratic		Swing		

2000
Party	Candidate	Votes	%	±%
Democratic	Hidenori Sasaki	70,680	39.95	▼8.77
LDP	Hiroshi Imazu	68,781	38.87	▲9.21
JCP	Noriko Mashita	21,376	12.08	▲1.27
Liberal	Masahito Nishikawa	16,104	9.10	new
Turnout			65.03	
Democratic hold		Swing	▼8.77	
