= Hokkaido 9th district =

Japan House of Representatives constituency

Hokkaidō 9th District
- Parliamentary constituency for the Japanese House of Representatives
- Numbered map of Hokkaidō Prefecture single-member districts
- Prefecture: Hokkaido
- Proportional District: Hokkaido
- Electorate: 359,458(2026)

Current constituency
- Created: 1994
- Seats: One
- Party: LDP
- Representative: Hideki Matsushita
- Created from: Hokkaidō's 4th "medium-sized" district
- Municipalities: Kushiro and Nemuro Subprefectures

Hokkaidō 9th district is a constituency of the House of Representatives in the Diet of Japan (national legislature). It consists of Hokkaido's Hidaka and Iburi Subprefectures. As of 2009, 414,438 eligible voters were registered in the district.

Hokkaidō 9th district, like neighboring 8th and 10th district, was considered a "Democratic kingdom" (minshu-ōkoku), a stronghold of the Democratic Party of Japan (DPJ). From its creation in 1996 until 2012 it had been represented by DPJ co-founder Yukio Hatoyama. In 2012, Hatoyama retired. The LDP had nominated Hokkaidō prefectural assemblyman and former Olympic speed skater Manabu Horii as their candidate in July 2012.

Horii held the seat until 2021 when he was defeated by Tatsumaru Yamaoka, son of Diet member Kenji Yamaoka.

In the 2000, 2003 and 2005 general elections, the Liberal Democratic Party's candidate was Hirofumi Iwakura, later mayor of Tomakomai, Iburi Subprefecture. In 2000, Iwakura lost the district to Hatoyama by a margin of less than 3,000 votes.

Before the 1994 electoral reform, the area had been part of Hokkaido 4th district where five representatives were elected by single non-transferable vote. Yukio Hatoyama (New Party Sakigake), Tatsuo Takahashi (LDP) and Tomoko Kami (JCP) had already stood as candidates there in 1993.

== List of representatives ==
Representative	Party	Dates	Notes
Yukio Hatoyama	DPJ	1996 – 2012	Prime Minister of Japan (2009–10)
Manabu Horii	LDP	2012 – 2021	Elected in Hokkaido PR block, resigned in 2024
Tatsumaru Yamaoka	CDP	2021 – 2026	Elected in Hokkaido PR block
Hideki Matsushita	LDP	2026 –	

== Election results ==
2026
Party	Candidate	Votes	%	±%
LDP	Hideki Matsushita	87,984	43.1	▲10.1
Centrist Reform	Tatsumaru Yamaoka (Won PR Seat)	81,063	39.7	▼16.4
Sanseitō	Miho Kanno	22,900	11.2	
JCP	Hiroshi Tatsuno	12,142	5.9	▼5
Turnout		204,089	57.75	▲4.4
Registered electors		359,458		
LDP gain from Centrist Reform				

2024
Party	Candidate	Votes	%	±%
CDP	Tatsumaru Yamaoka	106,007	56.1	▲4.6
LDP	Hideki Matsushita	62,328	33.0	▼15.5
JCP	Hiroshi Tatsuno	20,557	10.9	
Turnout			53.35	▼5.57
Registered electors		366,294		
CDP hold				

2021
Party	Candidate	Votes	%	±%
CDP	Tatsumaru Yamaoka	113,512	51.51	▲13.5
LDP	Manabu Horii (endorsed by Kōmeitō) (won PR seat)	106,842	48.49	▲1.8
Majority			3.02	
Turnout			58.92	▼1.04
CDP gain from LDP		Swing	▼5.8	

2017 Japanese general election: Hokkaido 9th
Party	Candidate	Votes	%	±%
LDP	Manabu Horii (endorsed by Kōmeitō and New Party Daichi)	108,747	46.8%	
Kibō no Tō	Tatsumaru Yamaoka (won PR seat)	88,320	38.0%	
JCP	Chiharu Matsuhashi	35,543	15.3%	

2014 Japanese general election: Hokkaido 9th
Party	Candidate	Votes	%	±%
LDP	Manabu Horii (endorsed by Kōmeitō)	97,805	45.73	▼9.46
Democratic	Tatsumaru Yamaoka	86,252	40.32	▲12.25
JCP	Ryōichi Kudō	29,841	13.95	▲0.62
Majority		10,653	5.41	▼21.71
Turnout			55.19	▼2.24
LDP hold		Swing	▼10.86	

2012 Japanese general election: Hokkaido 9th
Party	Candidate	Votes	%	±%
LDP	Manabu Horii (endorsed by Kōmeitō)	121,145	55.19	▲29.13
Democratic	Tatsumaru Yamaoka (endorsed by PNP)	61,616	28.07	▼38.29
JCP	Yasuko Hanai	29,257	13.33	▲6.70
Ainu	Naomi Shimazaki	7,495	3.41	N/A
Turnout			57.43	▼17.24
LDP gain from Democratic		Swing	▼33.7	

2009 Japanese general election: Hokkaido 9th
Party	Candidate	Votes	%	±%
Democratic	Yukio Hatoyama (endorsed by PNP)	201,461	66.3	▲17.0
LDP	Satoshi Kawabata (endorsed by Kōmeitō)	79,116	26.1	▼16.9
JCP	Akiko Satō	20,286	6.7	▼1.0
Happiness Realization	Eiichi Satomura	2,735	0.9	N/A
Turnout		308,795	74.67	▲1.41

2005 Japanese general election: Hokkaido 9th
Party	Candidate	Votes	%	±%
Democratic	Yukio Hatoyama	150,050	49.3	▼0.7
LDP	Hirofumi Iwakura (endorsed by Kōmeitō)	131,130	43.0	▲0.9
JCP	Akiko Satō	23,400	7.7	▼0.2
Turnout		308,545	73.26	

2003 Japanese general election: Hokkaido 9th
Party	Candidate	Votes	%	±%
Democratic	Yukio Hatoyama (endorsed by SDP)	141,442	50.0	▲4.6
LDP	Hirofumi Iwakura (endorsed by Kōmeitō)	118,958	42.1	▼2.5
JCP	Seiji Tanimoto	22,382	7.9	▼2.1

2000 Japanese general election: Hokkaido 9th
Party	Candidate	Votes	%	±%
Democratic	Yukio Hatoyama	131,500	45.4	▼7.4
LDP	Hirofumi Iwakura (endorsed by Kōmeitō, NCP) (won PR seat)	128,975	44.6	▲17.1
JCP	Yūichi Tazawa	28,840	10.0	▼9.7

1996 Japanese general election: Hokkaido 9th
Party	Candidate	Votes	%	±%
Democratic	Yukio Hatoyama	131,936	52.8	
LDP	Tatsuo Takahashi	68,793	27.5	
JCP	Tomoko Kami	49,196	19.7	

House of Representatives (Japan)
Preceded by Fukuoka 8th district	Constituency represented by the prime minister 2009–2010	Succeeded by Tokyo 18th district
