= Hokkaido Legislative Assembly =

Parliament of Hokkaido, Japan

Hokkaido Legislative Assembly 北海道議会

Type
- Type: Unicameral

Leadership
- Chairman: Akira Tomihara, LDP
- Vice Chairman: Hisao Inamura, CDP

Structure
- Seats: 100
- Political groups: Government (62) LDP (54) Kōmeitō (8) Opposition (38) CDP (27) Yūshikai (8) JCP (2) Ishin (1)

Elections
- Last election: 9 April 2023

Meeting place
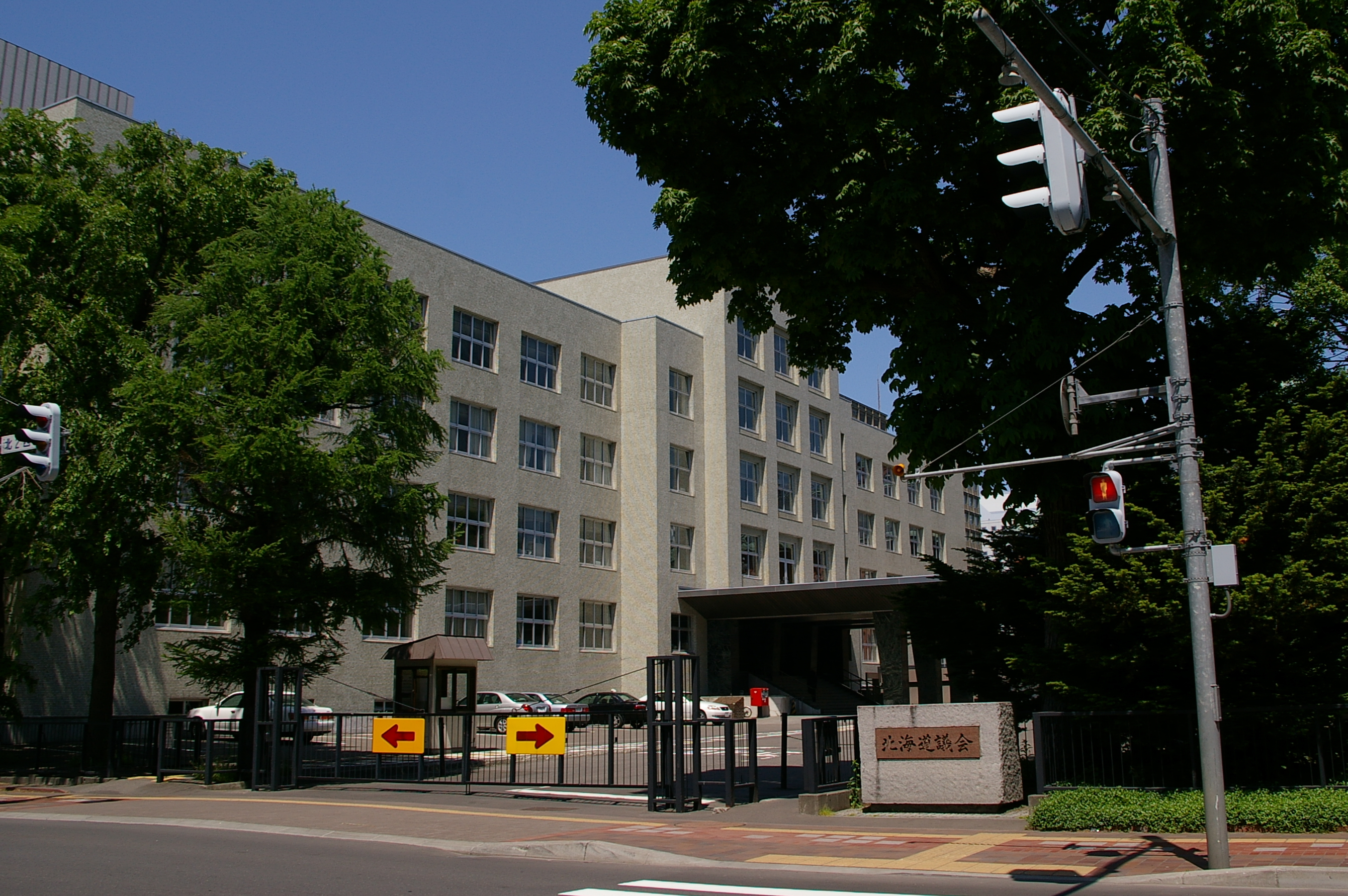
- The Hokkaido Legislative Assembly building in Sapporo

Website
- www.gikai.pref.hokkaido.lg.jp

The Hokkaido Legislative Assembly (北海道議会, Hokkaidōgikai) is the prefectural parliament of Hokkaido.

== History ==
In April 2019, Ayako Fuchigami was elected to this assembly, becoming the first openly transgender person elected to a Japanese prefectural assembly.

== Members ==
As of 29 October 2024

Constituency	Members	Party
Chūō Ward	Masahiro Chiba	LDP/Dōminkaigi
Chūō Ward	Hisako Higaki	LDP/Dōminkaigi
Chūō Ward	Shōichi Tanaka	CDP/Dōmin Rengō
Kita Ward	Yasunori Dōmi	LDP/Dōminkaigi
Kita Ward	Shiho Nakanowatari	Komeito
Kita Ward	Masahiro Yamane	CDP/Dōmin Rengō
Kita Ward	Sawako Ishikawa	Hokkaidō Yūshikai
Higashi Ward	Yasuji Watanabe	LDP/Dōminkaigi
Higashi Ward	Hiromi Achira	Komeito
Higashi Ward	Ayako Fuchigami	CDP/Dōmin Rengō
Higashi Ward	Mayumi Yamazaki	Japan Innovation Party
Shiroishi Ward	Jyōichi Itō	LDP/Dōminkaigi
Shiroishi Ward	Shigeyuki Mori	Komeito
Shiroishi Ward	Mayumi Hirota	CDP/Dōmin Rengō
Atsubetsu Ward	Masaru Hanasaki	LDP/Dōminkaigi
Atsubetsu Ward	Kazutada Sugawara	CDP/Dōmin Rengō
Toyohira Ward	Atsuko Ookoshi	LDP/Dōminkaigi
Toyohira Ward	Yūki Yoshida	LDP/Dōminkaigi
Toyohira Ward	Takefumi Matsuyama	CDP/Dōmin Rengō
Kiyota Ward	Junichi Miyashita	LDP/Dōminkaigi
Kiyota Ward	Daishi Kajiya	CDP/Dōmin Rengō
Minami Ward	Takahiro Katō	LDP/Dōminkaigi
Minami Ward	Minori Hatakeyama	CDP/Dōmin Rengō
Nishi Ward	Kōji Maruiwa	LDP/Dōminkaigi
Nishi Ward	Keita Wada	LDP/Dōminkaigi
Nishi Ward	Hiromitsu Takeda	CDP/Dōmin Rengō
Teine Ward	Hisako Takeichi	LDP/Dōminkaigi
Teine Ward	Takahiro Shimizu	CDP/Dōmin Rengō
Hakodate	Tatsuyoshi Fujii	LDP/Dōminkaigi
Hakodate	Akira Tomihara	LDP/Dōminkaigi
Hakodate	Maki Umino	Komeito
Hakodate	Yōko Hirade	CDP/Dōmin Rengō
Hakodate	Tōru Takahashi	CDP/Dōmin Rengō
Otaru	Tadahiro Satō	LDP/Dōminkaigi
Otaru	Sōnosuke Kawasumi	CDP/Dōmin Rengō
Otaru	Harumi Maruyama	Japanese Communist Party
Asahikawa	Yusaku Hayashi	LDP/Dōminkaigi
Asahikawa	Takanobu Azumi	LDP/Dōminkaigi
Asahikawa	Masayuki Kinoshita	LDP/Dōminkaigi
Asahikawa	Nobuhisa Terashima	Komeito
Asahikawa	Akane Miyazaki	CDP/Dōmin Rengō
Asahikawa	Noriko Mashita	Japanese Communist Party
Muroran	Hideya Chiba	LDP/Dōminkaigi
Muroran	Nobuyoshi Takiguchi	Hokkaidō Yūshikai
Kushiro City	Shogo Ito	LDP/Dōminkaigi
Kushiro City	Ryo Okada	CDP/Dōmin Rengō
Kushiro City	Hideki Tanaka	Komeito
Obihiro	Mitsushige Murata	LDP/Dōminkaigi
Obihiro	Takuya Shimizu	LDP/Dōminkaigi
Obihiro	Hitoshi Suzuki	CDP/Dōmin Rengō
Kitami	Kenji Funabashi	LDP/Dōminkaigi
Kitami	Kazuma Suzuki	CDP/Dōmin Rengō
Iwamizawa	Ataru Muraki	LDP/Dōminkaigi
Iwamizawa	Hirotoshi Nakagawa	CDP/Dōmin Rengō
Abashiri	Jun’ya Satō	Hokkaidō Yūshikai
Tomakomai	Yoshihisa Itaya	LDP/Dōminkaigi
Tomakomai	Mamoru Nakamura	Komeito
Tomakomai	Kiyoshi Okita	CDP/Dōmin Rengō
Wakkanai	Masato Yoshida	LDP/Dōminkaigi
Ebetsu	Hajime Tsunoda	LDP/Dōminkaigi
Ebetsu	Jun Kiba	CDP/Dōmin Rengō
Nayoro	Hidetoshi Nakano	LDP/Dōminkaigi
Nemuro City	Munenobu Matsuura	LDP/Dōminkaigi
Chitose	Noriyuki Ōta	LDP/Dōminkaigi
Chitose	Chiyomi Kobayashi	CDP/Dōmin Rengō
Takikawa	Akihiro Ōkawa	Hokkaidō Yūshikai
Noboribetsu	Kōsuke Akane	Hokkaidō Yūshikai
Eniwa	Yoshinori Tanaka	LDP/Dōminkaigi
Eniwa	Takatoshi Hayasaka	LDP/Dōminkaigi
Date	Tomoyasu Nakayama	Hokkaidō Yūshikai
Kitahiroshima	Yoshiko Tsuruha	LDP/Dōminkaigi
Hokuto	Naoto Takiguchi	LDP/Dōminkaigi
Sorachi	Mami Uemura	LDP/Dōminkaigi
Sorachi	Shōgo Aratō	Komeito
Sorachi	Hisao Inamura	CDP/Dōmin Rengō
Sorachi	Shōji Shirakawa	Hokkaidō Yūshikai
Ishikari	Daisuke Sasaki	LDP/Dōminkaigi
Ishikari	Hideaki Ikehata	CDP/Dōmin Rengō
Shiribeshi	Noritoshi Murata	LDP/Dōminkaigi
Shiribeshi	Shūji Ichihashi	CDP/Dōmin Rengō
Iburi	Noriomi Kanbe	LDP/Dōminkaigi
Hidaka	Sumio Fujisawa	LDP/Dōminkaigi
Hidaka	Yuji Kobayashi	LDP/Dōminkaigi
Oshima	Akira Tomihara	LDP/Dōminkaigi
Oshima	Hiroshi Sasada	CDP/Dōmin Rengō
Hiyama	Takayuki Uchida	LDP/Dōminkaigi
Kamikawa	Hirofumi Imazu	LDP/Dōminkaigi
Kamikawa	Kenta Mizuma	LDP/Dōminkaigi
Kamikawa	Yūkō Kitaguchi	CDP/Dōmin Rengō
Rumoi	Takahiro Asano	LDP/Dōminkaigi
Sōya	Masashi Miyoshi	LDP/Dōminkaigi
Okhotsk East	Fumiaki Takahashi	LDP/Dōminkaigi
Okhotsk West	Yūta Kuboaki	LDP/Dōminkaigi
Okhotsk West	Tōru Niinuma	Hokkaidō Yūshikai
Tokachi	Ryūichi Kita	LDP/Dōminkaigi
Tokachi	Yoshitsugu Kuroda	LDP/Dōminkaigi
Tokachi	Masashi Koizumi	CDP/Dōmin Rengō
Tokachi	Ryūji Ikemoto	Hokkaidō Yūshikai
Kushiro	Shigeo Kirinoki	LDP/Dōminkaigi
Nemuro	Tetsuo Nakatsukasa	LDP/Dōminkaigi

A list of past members is available at the assembly's website.
