= Jun Mukōyama =

Japanese female businesswoman and politician (1983-)

- 向山 淳
- Official portrait, 2025

Member of the House of Representatives
- Incumbent
- Assumed office November 1, 2024
- Preceded by: Multi-member district
- Constituency: Hokkaido PR (2024–2026); Hokkaido 8th (2026–present)

Parliamentary Vice-Minister for Internal Affairs and Communications
- Incumbent
- Assumed office October 22, 2025

Personal details
- Born: November 19, 1983 (age 42) Kawaguchi, Saitama, Japan
- Party: Liberal Democratic (Shikōkai)
- Spouse(s): Satoshi Mukōyama (Director and Executive Officer of Luup)
- Children: 1
- Education: Bachelor's in Political Science Keio University; Master's in Public Administration Harvard University
- Occupation: Businesswoman and Politician
- Website: Official Website
- Nickname(s): Mukojun; Jun-chan

Jun Mukōyama (Note: Her surname is also spelled Mukaiyama, which comes from the kanji version of her name (向山淳). This article uses the kana version of her name, Mukōyama (むこうやま じゅん).) (向山淳 and むこうやま じゅん), nicknames: "Mukojun, Jun-chan", (born November 19, 1983) is a Japanese politician. She is a member of the House of Representatives and Parliamentary Vice-Minister for Internal Affairs and Communications.

== Early life ==
She was born in Kawaguchi, Saitama Prefecture on November 19, 1983. Due to her father's work, she lived in Peru from the age of 2 to 4, the United States from the age of 11 to 14 , and Argentina from the age of 14 to 15, before graduating from junior high school. After graduating from Keio Girls' High School, she went on to study and graduate from the Department of Political Science, Faculty of Law, Keio University.

Mukōyama currently lives in Hakodate with her husband, Satoshi Mukōyama, and their daughter. She states that she loves street dancing and walking around town (taking photos, eating). On her YouTube channel and other social media accounts, she uses her nickname "Mukojun".

== Career ==
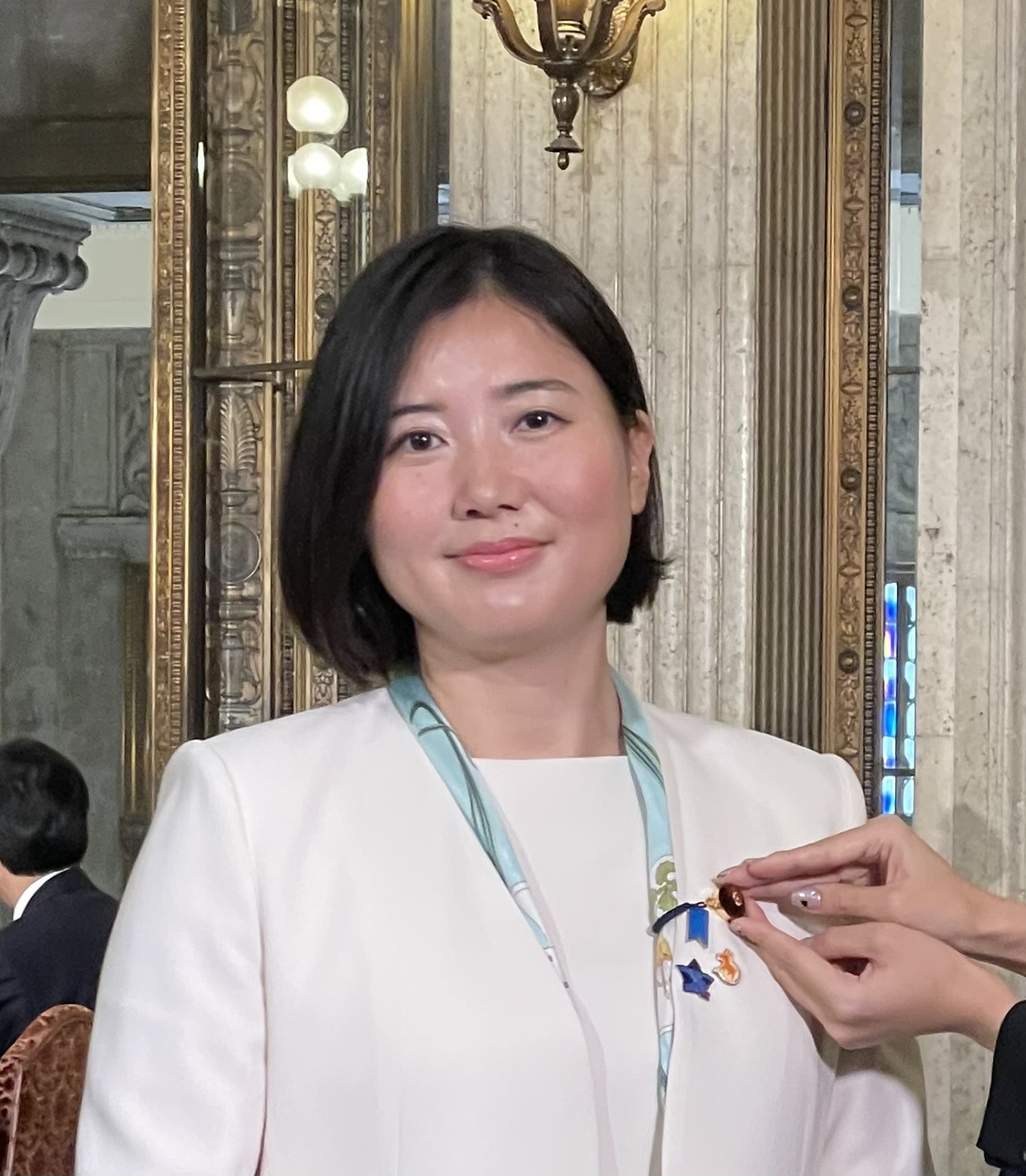
Jun Mukōyama's first visit to the Diet, November 11, 2024

She worked for Mitsubishi Corporation for 13 years, primarily in the internet payment business and infrastructure investments in power and ports. She married her colleague, Satoshi Mukōyama, a native of Hokkaido, and was stationed in Toronto, Canada. She and Satoshi say right beside each other at Mitsubishi. While in Canada, she served as General Manager of the Infrastructure Finance Department at Mitsubishi Corporation Canada and was traferred to the Strategic Investment Department of OMERS (Ontario Municipal Employees Retirement System). At OMERS she was involved in infrastructure investments in power plants, ports, highways, and other areas in Europe, the United States, and Australia, as well as corporate revitalization investments for small and medium-sized enterprises. After that, when her husband was transferred, she left her job and focused on trying to conceive as a housewife, but struggled with infertility. This experience motivated her to pursue a career in politics. She decided to study abroad to learn about policy, and upon receiving her acceptance letter, she discovered she was pregnant. She received a scholarship from the Kamiyama Foundation and, together with her newborn daughter, she studied at John F. Kennedy School of Government, Harvard University at her own expense. Satoshi is now an executie at Luup, a street bike rental company.

After graduating, she participated in the COVID-19 Private Temporary Investigation Committee as a Senior Visiting Researcher at the Asia Pacific Initiative, and also served as a member of the Web3PT Working Group of the Liberal Democratic Party ’s Digital Society Promotion Headquarters, a founder of a group of parents considering how to balance work and childcare during the COVID-19 crisis, and the representative of Mukaiyama Policy Lab.

Due to the executive's policy to increase the proportion of women in proportional representation districts to 30 percent for the 26th regular election for the House of Councillors in July 2022, she quickly received the Liberal Democratic Party's endorsement and ran for office six weeks before the election was announced, but she only managed to win 20,638 votes and was defeated.

She then applied for the next House of Representatives election in Hakodate, where her husband's family lives, and became the head of the Liberal Democratic Party's Hokkaido 8th District branch in July 2023. In April 2024, Hajime Nomata, former chairman of the Nomata Gakuen educational corporation, became chairman of the "Mukaiyama Jun United Supporters Association."

On October 15, 2024, the 50th general election for the House of Representatives was announced, with three candidates running in Hokkaido's 8th district: Mukaiyama, Seiji Osaka, the incumbent Constitutional Democratic Party member, and Katsumi Homma, a former Hakodate City Council member and newcomer to the Japanese Communist Party. Osaka was not included on the proportional representation list. On October 25, the Yomiuri Shimbun announced the final results, reporting that "Mukaiyama has caught up with Osaka, who had been in the lead, making the race close." The general election was held on October 27. Just after the voting closed at 8 p.m., Hokkaido Cultural Broadcasting reported that Osaka had been declared the winner. Osaka was elected for a sixth term. The Liberal Democratic Party won three seats in the Hokkaido proportional representation block . Of the two seats, excluding Yoshitaka Ito , who was in sole first place, Mukōyama won her first election with the second-lowest margin of defeat (84.909 percent).

On September 5, 2025, she signed and stamped a document confirming her intention to bring forward the presidential election. On October 22 of the same year, she was appointed Parliamentary Vice-Minister for Internal Affairs and Communications in the Takaichi Cabinet.

== Political positions ==
Mukōyama focuses on promoting Hokkaido—which she feels does not get the appropriate level of attention from the national government, the working class, natural resources, and reversing the population decline.

Like the majority of representatives in her party, Mukōyama also believes that nuclear energy is necessary for Japan's energy needs at present, even though nuclear weapons should not be considered. Furthermore, she advocates for a revision of Japan's anti-militarist Constitution.

On the international stage, Mukōyama declared herself in favor of tightening the sanctions imposed on Russia, following the Russo-Ukrainian conflict.

Unlike other members of the LDP, Mukōyama supports attempts to change the Japanese law that requires spouses to share the same surname. She also supports the establishment of a quota system for women in Japanese political life, in order to promote their access to high-level positions, as well as the recognition of same-sex marriage in Japan. She opposes the continued presence of women in the Japanese imperial family after marriage, as well as the ascension of a woman to the Chrysanthemum Throne.

On December 8, 2024, she appeared as a new member of the Liberal Democratic Party on NHK's Sunday Debate program "Questioning New Diet Members: What Politics and Society Should They Aim for?" She discussed political activities on social media, political funding issues, how to deal with the current generation, and parliamentary debates as a minority ruling party.

== Controversies ==
Upon her election, and during her first entry into the National Diet, Mukōyama took a photo of another new female Diet member, Kaoru Fukuda inside the building, creating controversy. This is prohibited by the internal regulations as the rule "Members of the House shall respect the dignity of the House" is interpreted as prohibiting Diet members from taking photographs in the chamber; despite the fact that TV cameras are allowed. The LDP issued both of them stern warnings. Mukōyama and Fukuda both apologized on Twitter. There was considerable debate about the dichotomy of this rule and the use of social media in politics.

Mukōyama is also the target of criticism after it was discovered that Prime Minister Shigeru Ishiba sent a gift check to all newly elected LDP members following the snap elections of October 2024. She nevertheless announced that she returned the check immediately upon receipt.

== Elections ==
House of Representatives (Japan)
Preceded by	Member of the House of Representatives for Hokkaido proportional block (proportional); 2024–present	Incumbent
Political offices
Preceded by Unknown	Parliamentary Vice-Minister for Internal Affairs and Communications; 2025–	Incumbent

== Book ==
- (co-authors) Asia Pacific Initiative Foundation; Mukōyama, Jun (October 2020). 新型コロナ対応・民間臨時調査会 調査・検証報告書 [COVID-19 Response: Private Temporary Investigation Committee Investigation and Verification Report] (in Japanese). Chiyoda ward, Tokyo: Discover 21. ISBN 9784799326800.
