= Tatsumaru Yamaoka =

Japanese politician (born 1979)

- 山岡 達丸
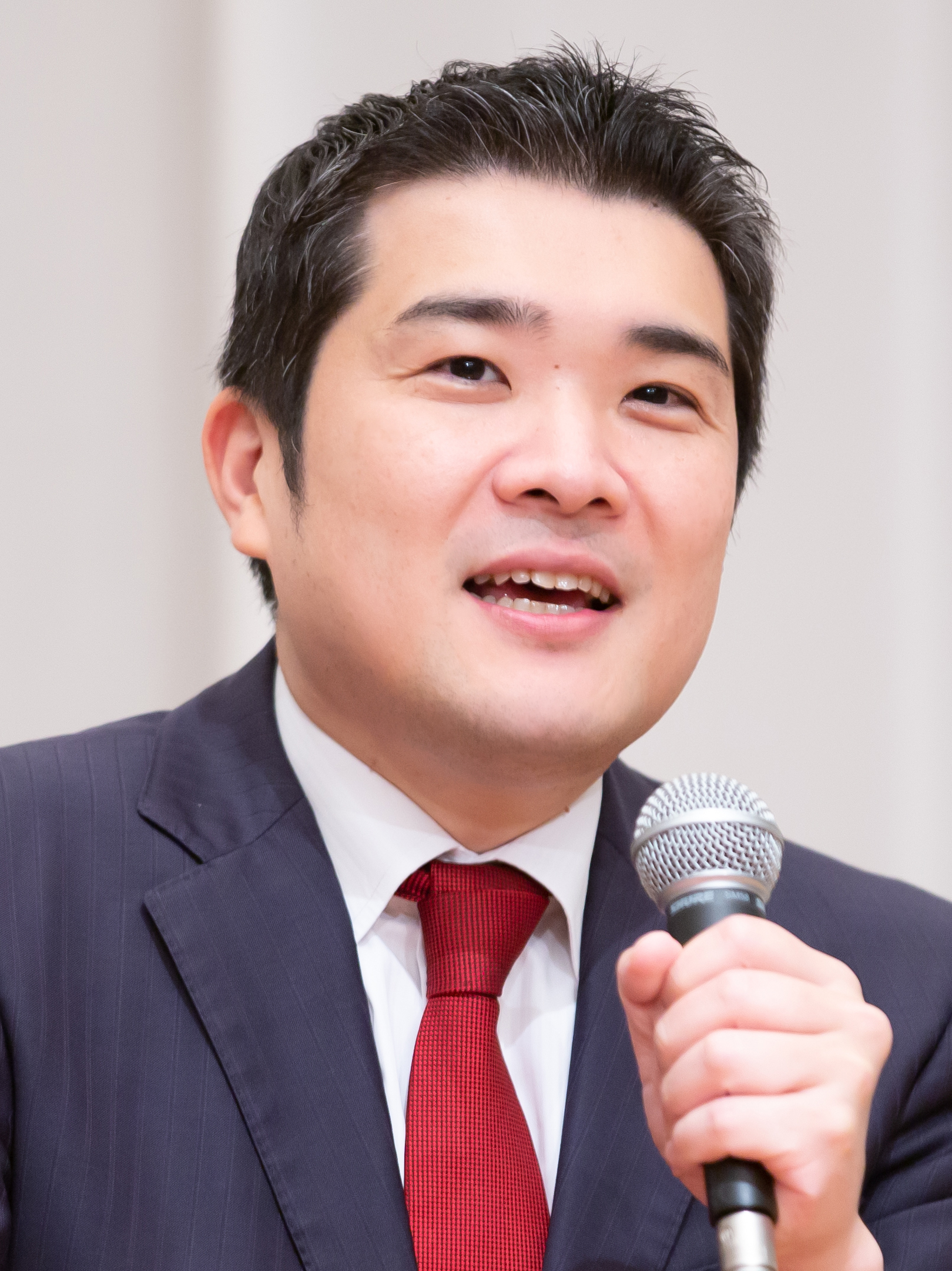
- Yamaoka in 2023

Member of the House of Representatives
- Incumbent
- Assumed office 22 October 2017
- Preceded by: Multi-member district
- Constituency: Hokkaido PR (2017–2021); Hokkaido 9th (2021–2026); Hokkaido PR (2026–present)
- In office 30 August 2009 – 16 November 2012
- Constituency: Hokkaido PR

Personal details
- Born: 22 July 1979 (age 47) Tokyo, Japan
- Party: DRP (since 2026)
- Other political affiliations: DPJ (2009–2016); DP (2016–2017); KnT (2017–2018); DPP (2018–2020); CDP (2020–2026); CRA (2026)
- Parent: Kenji Yamaoka (father)
- Relatives: Sōhachi Yamaoka (grandfather)
- Education: Keio University

Tatsumaru Yamaoka (山岡達丸, Yamaoka Tatsumaru; born 22 July 1979) is a Japanese politician. He has been a member of the House of Representatives since 2017, having previously served from 2009 to 2012. He is the son of Kenji Yamaoka.
