= Representatives elected in the 2021 Japanese general election =

This is a list of Representatives elected to the House of Representatives of Japan at the 2021 general election, held on 31 October 2021.

== Composition at election ==
Party	Seats
Liberal Democratic Party	259
Constitutional Democratic Party of Japan	96
Nippon Ishin no Kai	41
Komeito	32
Democratic Party For the People	11
Japanese Communist Party	10
Reiwa Shinsengumi	3
Social Democratic Party	1
Independents	12
Total	465
Source: MIAC

== Representatives ==
Constituency	Elected Members	Elected Party	Notes
=== Hokkaido === 12 single-member and 8 proportional representation seats.
==== Hokkaido Prefecture ====
Hokkaido-1st	Daiki Michishita	Constitutional Democratic	
Hokkaido-2nd	Kenko Matsuki	Constitutional Democratic	
Hokkaidō-3rd	Hirohisa Takagi	Liberal Democratic	
Hokkaidō-4th	Hiroyuki Nakamura	Liberal Democratic	
Hokkaidō-5th	Yoshiaki Wada	Liberal Democratic	
Hokkaidō-6th	Kuniyoshi Azuma	Liberal Democratic	
Hokkaidō-7th	Yoshitaka Itō	Liberal Democratic	
Hokkaidō-8th	Seiji Osaka	Constitutional Democratic	
Hokkaidō-9th	Tatsumaru Yamaoka	Constitutional Democratic	
Hokkaidō-10th	Hisashi Inatsu	Kōmeitō	
Hokkaidō-11th	Kaori Ishikawa	Constitutional Democratic	
Hokkaidō-12th	Arata Takebe	Liberal Democratic	
==== Hokkaido Block ====
Hokkaidō block	Takako Suzuki	Liberal Democratic	
Hokkaidō block	Kōichi Watanabe	Liberal Democratic	
Hokkaidō block	Manabu Horii	Liberal Democratic	
Hokkaidō block	Yūko Nakagawa	Liberal Democratic	
Hokkaidō block	Kureha Otsuki	Constitutional Democratic	
Hokkaidō block	Yutaka Arai	Constitutional Democratic	
Hokkaidō block	Hiroshi Kamiya	Constitutional Democratic	
Hokkaidō block	Hidemichi Satō	Kōmeitō	
=== Tōhoku === 25 single-member and 13 proportional representation seats.
==== Aomori Prefecture ====
Aomori-1st	Akinori Eto	Liberal Democratic	
Aomori-2nd	Junichi Kanda	Liberal Democratic	
Aomori-3rd	Jiro Kimura	Liberal Democratic	
==== Iwate Prefecture ====
Iwate-1st	Takeshi Shina	Constitutional Democratic	
Iwate-2nd	Shun'ichi Suzuki	Liberal Democratic	
Iwate-3rd	Takashi Fujiwara	Liberal Democratic	
==== Miyagi Prefecture ====
Miyagi-1st	Tōru Doi	Liberal Democratic	
Miyagi-2nd	Sayuri Kamata	Constitutional Democratic	
Miyagi-3rd	Akihiro Nishimura	Liberal Democratic	
Miyagi-4th	Shintarō Itō	Liberal Democratic	
Miyagi-5th	Jun Azumi	Constitutional Democratic	
Miyagi-6th	Itsunori Onodera	Liberal Democratic	
==== Akita Prefecture ====
Akita-1st	Hiroyuki Togashi	Liberal Democratic	
Akita-2nd	Takashi Midorikawa	Constitutional Democratic	
Akita-3rd	Nobuhide Minorikawa	Liberal Democratic	
==== Yamagata Prefecture ====
Yamagata-1st	Toshiaki Endō	Liberal Democratic	
Yamagata-2nd	Norikazu Suzuki	Liberal Democratic	
Yamagata-3rd	Ayuko Kato	Liberal Democratic	
==== Fukushima Prefecture ====
Fukushima-1st	Emi Kaneko	Constitutional Democratic	
Fukushima-2nd	Takumi Nemoto	Liberal Democratic	
Fukushima-3rd	Kōichirō Genba	Constitutional Democratic	
Fukushima-4th	Shinji Oguma	Liberal Democratic	
Fukushima-5th	Masayoshi Yoshino	Constitutional Democratic	
==== Tohoku Block ====
Tōhoku block	Jun Tsushima	Liberal Democratic	
Tōhoku block	Kenya Akiba	Liberal Democratic	
Tōhoku block	Ichirō Kanke	Liberal Democratic	
Tōhoku block	Yoshitami Kameoka	Liberal Democratic	
Tōhoku block	Katsutoshi Kaneda	Liberal Democratic	
Tōhoku block	Kentaro Uesugi	Liberal Democratic	
Tōhoku block	Akiko Okamoto	Constitutional Democratic	
Tōhoku block	Manabu Terata	Constitutional Democratic	
Tōhoku block	Ichirō Ozawa	Constitutional Democratic	
Tōhoku block	Yuki Baba	Constitutional Democratic	
Tōhoku block	Kenichi Shōji	Kōmeitō	
Tōhoku block	Chizuko Takahashi	JCP	
Tōhoku block	Atsushi Hayasaka	Nippon Ishin no Kai	
=== Northern Kanto (Kita Kanto) === 32 single-member and 19 proportional representation seats.
==== Ibaraki Prefecture ====
Ibaraki-1st	Nobuyuki Fukushima	Independent	
Ibaraki-2nd	Fukushirō Nukaga	Liberal Democratic	
Ibaraki-3rd	Yasuhiro Hanashi	Liberal Democratic	
Ibaraki-4th	Hiroshi Kajiyama	Liberal Democratic	
Ibaraki-5th	Satoshi Asano	DPFP	
Ibaraki-6th	Ayano Kinimitsu	Liberal Democratic	
Ibaraki-7th	Keiko Nagaoka	Liberal Democratic	
==== Tochigi Prefecture ====
Tochigi-1st	Hajime Funada	Liberal Democratic	
Tochigi-2nd	Akio Fukuda	Constitutional Democratic	
Tochigi-3rd	Kazuo Yana	Liberal Democratic	
Tochigi-4th	Tsutomu Satō	Liberal Democratic	
Tochigi-5th	Toshimitsu Motegi	Liberal Democratic	
==== Gunma Prefecture ====
Gunma-1st	Yasutaka Nakasone	Liberal Democratic	
Gunma-2nd	Toshirō Ino	Liberal Democratic	
Gunma-3rd	Hiroyoshi Sasagawa	Liberal Democratic	
Gunma-4th	Tatsuo Fukuda	Liberal Democratic	
Gunma-5th	Yūko Obuchi	Liberal Democratic	
==== Saitama Prefecture ====
Saitama-1st	Hideki Murai	Liberal Democratic	
Saitama-2nd	Yoshitaka Shindō	Liberal Democratic	
Saitama-3rd	Hitoshi Kikawada	Liberal Democratic	
Saitama-4th	Yashushi Hosaka	Liberal Democratic	
Saitama-5th	Yukio Edano	Constitutional Democratic	
Saitama-6th	Atsushi Oshima	Constitutional Democratic	
Saitama-7th	Hideyuki Nakano	Liberal Democratic	
Saitama-8th	Masahiko Shibayama	Liberal Democratic	
Saitama-9th	Taku Ōtsuka	Liberal Democratic	
Saitama-10th	Susumu Yamaguchi	Liberal Democratic	
Saitama-11th	Ryūji Koizumi	Liberal Democratic	
Saitama-12th	Toshikazu Morita	Constitutional Democratic	
Saitama-13th	Shinako Tsuchiya	Liberal Democratic	
Saitama-14th	Hiromi Mitsubayashi	Liberal Democratic	
Saitama-15th	Ryōsei Tanaka	Liberal Democratic	
==== Kita Kanto Block ====
Kita Kantō block	Asako Omi	Liberal Democratic	
Kita Kantō block	Atsushi Nonaka	Liberal Democratic	
Kita Kantō block	Hideki Makihara	Liberal Democratic	
Kita Kantō block	Yoshinori Tadokoro	Liberal Democratic	
Kita Kantō block	Akimasa Ishikawa	Liberal Democratic	
Kita Kantō block	Kiyoshi Igarashi	Liberal Democratic	
Kita Kantō block	Kazuyuki Nakane	Liberal Democratic	
Kita Kantō block	Takao Fujioka	Constitutional Democratic	
Kita Kantō block	Kishiro Nakamura	Constitutional Democratic	
Kita Kantō block	Yasuko Komiyama	Constitutional Democratic	
Kita Kantō block	Yusuke Sakamoto	Constitutional Democratic	
Kita Kantō block	Aoyama Yamato	Constitutional Democratic	
Kita Kantō block	Keiichi Ishii	Kōmeitō	
Kita Kantō block	Keiichi Koshimizu	Kōmeitō	
Kita Kantō block	Takahiro Fukushige	Kōmeitō	
Kita Kantō block	Ryo Sawada	Nippon Ishin no Kai	
Kita Kantō block	Hideaki Takahashi	Nippon Ishin no Kai	
Kita Kantō block	Yoshihiro Suzuki	DPFP	
Kita Kantō block	Tetsuya Shiokawa	JCP	
=== South Kanto (Minami Kanto) === 33 single-member and 22 proportional representation seats.
==== Chiba Prefecture ====
Chiba-1st	Kaname Tajima	Constitutional Democratic	
Chiba-2nd	Takayuki Kobayashi	Liberal Democratic	
Chiba-3rd	Hirokazu Matsuno	Liberal Democratic	
Chiba-4th	Yoshihiko Noda	Constitutional Democratic	
Chiba-5th	Kentarō Sonoura	Liberal Democratic	Resigned 19 December 2022
Chiba-6th	Hiromichi Watanabe	Liberal Democratic	
Chiba-7th	Ken Saitō	Liberal Democratic	
Chiba-8th	Satoshi Honjō	Constitutional Democratic	
Chiba-9th	Soichiro Okuno	Constitutional Democratic	
Chiba-10th	Motoo Hayashi	Liberal Democratic	
Chiba-11th	Eisuke Mori	Liberal Democratic	
Chiba-12th	Yasukazu Hamada	Liberal Democratic	
Chiba-13th	Hisashi Matsumoto	Liberal Democratic	
==== Kanagawa Prefecture ====
Kanagawa-1st	Gō Shinohara	Constitutional Democratic	
Kanagawa-2nd	Yoshihide Suga	Liberal Democratic	
Kanagawa-3rd	Hachiro Okonogi	Liberal Democratic	
Kanagawa-4th	Yuki Waseda	Constitutional Democratic	
Kanagawa-5th	Manabu Sakai	Liberal Democratic	
Kanagawa-6th	Naoki Furukawa	Liberal Democratic	
Kanagawa-7th	Keisuke Suzuki	Liberal Democratic	
Kanagawa-8th	Kenji Eda	Constitutional Democratic	
Kanagawa-9th	Ryu Hirofumi	Constitutional Democratic	
Kanagawa-10th	Kazunori Tanaka	Liberal Democratic	
Kanagawa-11th	Shinjirō Koizumi	Liberal Democratic	
Kanagawa-12th	Tomoko Abe	Constitutional Democratic	
Kanagawa-13th	Hideshi Futori	Constitutional Democratic	
Kanagawa-14th	Jiro Akama	Liberal Democratic	
Kanagawa-15th	Taro Kono	Liberal Democratic	
Kanagawa-16th	Yuichi Goto	Constitutional Democratic	
Kanagawa-17th	Karen Makishima	Liberal Democratic	
Kanagawa-18th	Daishiro Yamagiwa	Liberal Democratic	
==== Yamanashi Prefecture ====
Yamanashi-1st	Shin'ichi Nakatani	Liberal Democratic	
Yamanashi-2nd	Noriko Horiuchi	Liberal Democratic	
==== Minami Kanto Block ====
Minami Kantō block	Takeshi Hoshino	Liberal Democratic	
Minami Kantō block	Akira Amari	Liberal Democratic	
Minami Kantō block	Mari Akimoto	Liberal Democratic	
Minami Kantō block	Hidehiro Mitani	Liberal Democratic	
Minami Kantō block	Hirosuke Yoshiie	Liberal Democratic	
Minami Kantō block	Nobuhiro Nakayama	Liberal Democratic	
Minami Kantō block	Hiroaki Kadoyama	Liberal Democratic	
Minami Kantō block	Tomohiro Yamamoto	Liberal Democratic	
Minami Kantō block	Yoshitaka Sakurada	Liberal Democratic	
Minami Kantō block	Kazuma Nakatani	Constitutional Democratic	
Minami Kantō block	Yatagawa Hajime	Constitutional Democratic	
Minami Kantō block	Yoichiro Aoyagi	Constitutional Democratic	
Minami Kantō block	Katsuhito Nakajima	Constitutional Democratic	
Minami Kantō block	Makoto Yamazaki	Constitutional Democratic	
Minami Kantō block	Tatsuna Kanemura	Nippon Ishin no Kai	
Minami Kantō block	Kenta Fujimaki	Nippon Ishin no Kai	
Minami Kantō block	Yoshiharu Asakawa	Nippon Ishin no Kai	
Minami Kantō block	Noriko Furuya	Kōmeitō	
Minami Kantō block	Hideho Tsunoda	Kōmeitō	
Minami Kantō block	Kazuo Shii	JCP	
Minami Kantō block	Atsushi Suzuki	DPFP	
Minami Kantō block	Ryo Takeya	Reiwa Shinsengumi	
=== Tokyo === 25 single-member and 17 proportional representation seats.
==== Tokyo Prefecture ====
Tokyo-1st	Miki Yamada	Liberal Democratic	
Tokyo-2nd	Kiyoto Tsuji	Liberal Democratic	
Tokyo-3rd	Jin Matsubara	Constitutional Democratic	
Tokyo-4th	Masaaki Taira	Liberal Democratic	
Tokyo-5th	Yoshio Tezuka	Constitutional Democratic	
Tokyo-6th	Takayuki Ochiai	Constitutional Democratic	
Tokyo-7th	Akira Nagatsuma	Constitutional Democratic	
Tokyo-8th	Harumi Yoshida	Constitutional Democratic	
Tokyo-9th	Issei Yamagishi	Constitutional Democratic	
Tokyo-10th	Hayato Suzuki	Liberal Democratic	
Tokyo-11th	Hakubun Shimomura	Liberal Democratic	
Tokyo-12th	Mitsunari Okamoto	Komeito	
Tokyo-13th	Shin Tsuchida	Liberal Democratic	
Tokyo-14th	Midori Matsushima	Liberal Democratic	
Tokyo-15th	Mito Kakizawa	Independent	Resigned 1 February 2024
Tokyo-16th	Hideo Ōnishi	Liberal Democratic	
Tokyo-17th	Katsuei Hirasawa	Liberal Democratic	
Tokyo-18th	Naoto Kan	Constitutional Democratic	
Tokyo-19th	Yoshinori Suematsu	Constitutional Democratic	
Tokyo-20th	Seiji Kihara	Liberal Democratic	
Tokyo-21st	Kiyoshi Odawara	Liberal Democratic	
Tokyo-22nd	Tatsuya Ito	Liberal Democratic	
Tokyo-23rd	Masanobu Ogura	Liberal Democratic	
Tokyo-24th	Koichi Hagiuda	Liberal Democratic	
Tokyo-25th	Shinji Inoue	Liberal Democratic	
==== Tokyo Block ====
Tokyo block	Hiroshi Takagi	Liberal Democratic	
Tokyo block	Yohei Matsumoto	Liberal Democratic	
Tokyo block	Takao Ochi	Liberal Democratic	
Tokyo block	Kenji Wakamiya	Liberal Democratic	
Tokyo block	Akihisa Nagashima	Liberal Democratic	
Tokyo block	Hirotaka Ishihara	Liberal Democratic	
Tokyo block	Shunsuke Ito	Constitutional Democratic	
Tokyo block	Yosuke Suzuki	Constitutional Democratic	
Tokyo block	Mari Kaieda	Constitutional Democratic	
Tokyo block	Masako Okawara	Constitutional Democratic	
Tokyo block	Tsukasa Abe	Nippon Ishin no Kai	
Tokyo block	Taisuke Ono	Nippon Ishin no Kai	
Tokyo block	Yosuke Takagi	Kōmeitō	
Tokyo block	Koichi Kasai	Kōmeitō	
Tokyo block	Ryo Kasai	JCP	
Tokyo block	Toru Miyamoto	JCP	
Tokyo block	Taro Yamamoto	Reiwa Shinsengumi	
=== Hokuriku Shinetsu === 19 single-member and 11 proportional representation seats.
==== Niigata Prefecture ====
Niigata-1st	Chinami Nishimura	Constitutional Democratic	
Niigata-2nd	Kenichi Hosoda	Liberal Democratic	
Niigata-3rd	Hiroaki Saito	Liberal Democratic	
Niigata-4th	Makiko Kikuta	Constitutional Democratic	
Niigata-5th	Ryuichi Yoneyama	Independent	
Niigata-6th	Mamoru Umeya	Constitutional Democratic	
==== Toyama Prefecture ====
Toyama-1st	Hiroaki Tabata	Liberal Democratic	
Toyama-2nd	Eishun Ueda	Liberal Democratic	
Toyama-3rd	Keiichirō Tachibana	Liberal Democratic	
==== Ishikawa Prefecture ====
Ishikawa-1st	Takuo Komori	Liberal Democratic	
Ishikawa-2nd	Hajime Sasaki	Liberal Democratic	
Ishikawa-3rd	Shoji Nishida	Liberal Democratic	
==== Fukui Prefecture ====
Fukui-1st	Tomomi Inada	Liberal Democratic	
Fukui-2nd	Tsuyoshi Takagi	Liberal Democratic	
==== Nagano Prefecture ====
Nagano-1st	Kenta Wakabayashi	Liberal Democratic	
Nagano-2nd	Mitsu Shimojo	Constitutional Democratic	
Nagano-3rd	Yōsei Ide	Liberal Democratic	
Nagano-4th	Shigeyuki Gotō	Liberal Democratic	
Nagano-5th	Ichirō Miyashita	Liberal Democratic	
==== Hokuriku-Shinetsu Block ====
Hokuriku-Shinetsu block	Eiichiro Washio	Liberal Democratic	
Hokuriku-Shinetsu block	Shuichi Takatori	Liberal Democratic	
Hokuriku-Shinetsu block	Isato Kunisada	Liberal Democratic	
Hokuriku-Shinetsu block	Hirohiko Izumida	Liberal Democratic	
Hokuriku-Shinetsu block	Ichiro Tsukada	Liberal Democratic	
Hokuriku-Shinetsu block	Shunsuke Mutai	Liberal Democratic	
Hokuriku-Shinetsu block	Kazuya Kondo	Constitutional Democratic	
Hokuriku-Shinetsu block	Takashi Shinohara	Constitutional Democratic	
Hokuriku-Shinetsu block	Takeshi Kozu	Constitutional Democratic	
Hokuriku-Shinetsu block	Toyofumi Yoshida	Nippon Ishin no Kai	
Hokuriku-Shinetsu block	Hiromasa Nakagawa	Kōmeitō	
=== Tokai === 32 single-member and 21 proportional representation seats.
==== Gifu Prefecture ====
Gifu-1st	Seiko Noda	Liberal Democratic	
Gifu-2nd	Yasufumi Tanahashi	Liberal Democratic	
Gifu-3rd	Yōji Mutō	Liberal Democratic	
Gifu-4th	Shumpei Kaneko	Liberal Democratic	
Gifu-5th	Keiji Furuya	Liberal Democratic	
==== Shizuoka Prefecture ====
Shizuoka-1st	Yōko Kamikawa	Liberal Democratic	
Shizuoka-2nd	Tatsunori Ibayashi	Liberal Democratic	
Shizuoka-3rd	Nobuhiro Koyama	Constitutional Democratic	
Shizuoka-4th	Yoichi Fukazawa	Liberal Democratic	
Shizuoka-5th	Gōshi Hosono	Independent	
Shizuoka-6th	Takaaki Katsumata	Liberal Democratic	
Shizuoka-7th	Minoru Kiuchi	Liberal Democratic	
Shizuoka-8th	Kentarō Genma	Constitutional Democratic	
==== Aichi Prefecture ====
Aichi-1st	Hiromichi Kumada	Liberal Democratic	
Aichi-2nd	Motohisa Furukawa	DPFP	
Aichi-3rd	Shoichi Kondo	Constitutional Democratic	
Aichi-4th	Shōzō Kudō	Liberal Democratic	
Aichi-5th	Kenji Kanda	Liberal Democratic	
Aichi-6th	Hideki Niwa	Liberal Democratic	
Aichi-7th	Junji Suzuki	Liberal Democratic	
Aichi-8th	Tadahiko Itō	Liberal Democratic	
Aichi-9th	Yasumasa Nagasaka	Liberal Democratic	
Aichi-10th	Tetsuma Esaki	Liberal Democratic	
Aichi-11th	Tetsuya Yagi	Liberal Democratic	
Aichi-12th	Kazuhiko Shigetoku	Constitutional Democratic	
Aichi-13th	Kenusuke Ōnishi	Constitutional Democratic	
Aichi-14th	Soichiro Imaeda	Liberal Democratic	
Aichi-15th	Yukinori Nemoto	Liberal Democratic	
==== Mie Prefecture ====
Mie-1st	Norihisa Tamura	Liberal Democratic	
Mie-2nd	Hideto Kawasaki	Liberal Democratic	
Mie-3rd	Katsuya Okada	Constitutional Democratic	
Mie-4th	Eikei Suzuki	Liberal Democratic	
==== Tokai Block ====
Tokai block	Shuhei Aoyama	Liberal Democratic	
Tokai block	Taku Ishii	Liberal Democratic	
Tokai block	Hiroyuki Miyazawa	Liberal Democratic	Resigned 25 April 2024
Tokai block	Yoshitaka Ikeda	Liberal Democratic	
Tokai block	Ryu Shionoya	Liberal Democratic	
Tokai block	Takamoto Nakagawa	Liberal Democratic	
Tokai block	Masataka Ishihara	Liberal Democratic	
Tokai block	Takeshi Yoshikawa	Liberal Democratic	
Tokai block	Sakon Yamamoto	Liberal Democratic	
Tokai block	Yutaka Tomono	Constitutional Democratic	
Tokai block	Masaharu Nakagawa	Constitutional Democratic	
Tokai block	Yoshida Norihiko	Constitutional Democratic	
Tokai block	Shu Watanabe	Constitutional Democratic	
Tokai block	Yoshio Maki	Constitutional Democratic	
Tokai block	Yoshinori Ohguchi	Kōmeitō	
Tokai block	Wataru Itoh	Kōmeitō	
Tokai block	Yasuhiro Nakagawa	Kōmeitō	
Tokai block	Kazumi Sugimoto	Nippon Ishin no Kai	
Tokai block	Maki Misaki	Nippon Ishin no Kai	
Tokai block	Nobuko Motomura	JCP	
Tokai block	Ken Tanaka	DPFP	
=== Kinki === 47 single-member and 28 proportional representation seats.
==== Shiga Prefecture ====
Shiga-1st	Toshitaka Ōoka	Liberal Democratic	
Shiga-2nd	Ken'ichirō Ueno	Liberal Democratic	
Shiga-3rd	Nobuhide Takemura	Liberal Democratic	
Shiga-4th	Hiroo Kotera	Liberal Democratic	
==== Kyoto Prefecture ====
Kyōto-1st	Yasushi Katsume	Liberal Democratic	
Kyōto-2nd	Seiji Maehara	DPFP	
Kyōto-3rd	Kenta Izumi	Constitutional Democratic	
Kyōto-4th	Keiro Kitagami	Independent	
Kyōto-5th	Tarō Honda	Liberal Democratic	
Kyōto-6th	Kazunori Yamanoi	Constitutional Democratic	
==== Osaka Prefecture ====
Ōsaka-1st	Hidetaka Inoue	Nippon Ishin no Kai	
Ōsaka-2nd	Tadashi Morishima	Nippon Ishin no Kai	
Ōsaka-3rd	Shigeki Satō	Kōmeitō	
Ōsaka-4th	Teruo Minobe	Nippon Ishin no Kai	
Ōsaka-5th	Tōru Kunishige	Kōmeitō	
Ōsaka-6th	Shin'ichi Isa	Kōmeitō	
Ōsaka-7th	Takemitsu Okushita	Nippon Ishin no Kai	
Ōsaka-8th	Joji Uruma	Nippon Ishin no Kai	
Ōsaka-9th	Yasushi Adachi	Nippon Ishin no Kai	
Ōsaka-10th	Taku Ikeshita	Nippon Ishin no Kai	
Ōsaka-11th	Hiroshi Nakatsuka	Nippon Ishin no Kai	
Ōsaka-12th	Fumitake Fujita	Nippon Ishin no Kai	
Ōsaka-13th	Rohei Iwatani	Nippon Ishin no Kai	
Ōsaka-14th	Hitoshi Aoyagi	Nippon Ishin no Kai	
Ōsaka-15th	Yasuto Urano	Nippon Ishin no Kai	
Ōsaka-16th	Kazuo Kitagawa	Kōmeitō	
Ōsaka-17th	Nobuyuki Baba	Nippon Ishin no Kai	
Ōsaka-18th	Takashi Endō	Nippon Ishin no Kai	
Ōsaka-19th	Nobuhisa Ito	Nippon Ishin no Kai	
==== Hyogo Prefecture ====
Hyōgo-1st	Nobuhiko Isaka	Constitutional Democratic	
Hyōgo-2nd	Kazuyoshi Akaba	Kōmeitō	
Hyōgo-3rd	Yoshihiro Seki	Liberal Democratic	
Hyōgo-4th	Hisayuki Fujii	Liberal Democratic	
Hyōgo-5th	Kōichi Tani	Liberal Democratic	
Hyōgo-6th	Koichiro Ichimura	Nippon Ishin no Kai	
Hyōgo-7th	Kenji Yamada	Liberal Democratic	
Hyōgo-8th	Hiromasa Nakano	Kōmeitō	
Hyōgo-9th	Yasutoshi Nishimura	Liberal Democratic	
Hyōgo-10th	Kisaburō Tokai	Liberal Democratic	
Hyōgo-11th	Takeaki Matsumoto	Liberal Democratic	
Hyōgo-12th	Tsuyoshi Yamaguchi	Liberal Democratic	
==== Nara Prefecture ====
Nara-1st	Sumio Mabuchi	Constitutional Democratic	
Nara-2nd	Sanae Takaichi	Liberal Democratic	
Nara-3rd	Taido Tanose	Independent	
==== Wakayama Prefecture ====
Wakayama-1st	Shūhei Kishimoto	DPFP	Resigned 1 September 2022
Wakayama-2nd	Masatoshi Ishida	Liberal Democratic	
Wakayama-3rd	Toshihiro Nikai	Liberal Democratic	
==== Kinki Block ====
Kinki block	Keie Miki	Nippon Ishin no Kai	
Kinki block	Yuichiro Wada	Nippon Ishin no Kai	
Kinki block	Hiroki Sumiyoshi	Nippon Ishin no Kai	
Kinki block	Taketomo Horii	Nippon Ishin no Kai	
Kinki block	Sachiko Horiba	Nippon Ishin no Kai	
Kinki block	Ryota Endo	Nippon Ishin no Kai	
Kinki block	Yuichiro Ichitani	Nippon Ishin no Kai	
Kinki block	Kiyonari Maekawa	Nippon Ishin no Kai	Resigned 4 October 2023
Kinki block	Kotaro Ikebata	Nippon Ishin no Kai	
Kinki block	Masayuki Akagi	Nippon Ishin no Kai	
Kinki block	Nobuaki Okuno	Liberal Democratic	
Kinki block	Akira Yanagimoto	Liberal Democratic	
Kinki block	Masaki Ogushi	Liberal Democratic	
Kinki block	Shigeki Kobayashi	Liberal Democratic	
Kinki block	Hideyuki Tanaka	Liberal Democratic	
Kinki block	Munekiyo Koichi	Liberal Democratic	
Kinki block	Masahito Moriyama	Liberal Democratic	
Kinki block	Tomu Tanikawa	Liberal Democratic	
Kinki block	Shu Sakurai	Constitutional Democratic	
Kinki block	Hiroyuki Moriyama	Constitutional Democratic	
Kinki block	Hisashi Tokunaga	Constitutional Democratic	
Kinki block	Yuzuru Takeuchi	Kōmeitō	
Kinki block	Tomoko Ukishima	Kōmeitō	
Kinki block	Yoko Wanibuchi	Kōmeitō	
Kinki block	Keiji Kokuda	JCP	
Kinki block	Takeshi Miyamoto	JCP	
Kinki block	Alex Saito	DPFP	
Kinki block	Akiko Oishi	Reiwa Shinsengumi	
=== Chugoku === 20 single-member and 11 proportional representation seats.
==== Tottori Prefecture ====
Tottori-1st	Shigeru Ishiba	Liberal Democratic	
Tottori-2nd	Ryōsei Akazawa	Liberal Democratic	
==== Shimane Prefecture ====
Shimane-1st	Hiroyuki Hosoda	Liberal Democratic	Died 10 November 2023
Shimane-2nd	Yasuhiro Takami	Liberal Democratic	
==== Okayama Prefecture ====
Okayama-1st	Ichirō Aisawa	Liberal Democratic	
Okayama-2nd	Takashi Yamashita	Liberal Democratic	
Okayama-3rd	Shojiro Hiranuma	Independent	
Okayama-4th	Gaku Hashimoto	Liberal Democratic	
Okayama-5th	Katsunobu Kato	Liberal Democratic	
==== Hiroshima Prefecture ====
Hiroshima-1st	Fumio Kishida	Liberal Democratic	
Hiroshima-2nd	Hiroshi Hiraguchi	Liberal Democratic	
Hiroshima-3rd	Tetsuo Saito	Komeito	
Hiroshima-4th	Masayoshi Shintani	Liberal Democratic	
Hiroshima-5th	Minoru Terada	Liberal Democratic	
Hiroshima-6th	Koji Sato	Constitutional Democratic	
Hiroshima-7th	Fumiaki Kobayashi	Liberal Democratic	
==== Yamaguchi Prefecture ====
Yamaguchi-1st	Masahiro Komura	Liberal Democratic	
Yamaguchi-2nd	Nobuo Kishi	Liberal Democratic	Resigned 3 February 2023
Yamaguchi-3rd	Yoshimasa Hayashi	Liberal Democratic	
Yamaguchi-4th	Shinzo Abe	Liberal Democratic	Died 8 July 2022
==== Chugoku Block ====
Chūgoku block	Ishibashi Rintaro	Liberal Democratic	
Chūgoku block	Toshifumi Kojima	Liberal Democratic	
Chūgoku block	Toshiko Abe	Liberal Democratic	
Chūgoku block	Emiko Takashina	Liberal Democratic	
Chūgoku block	Sugita Mizuki	Liberal Democratic	
Chūgoku block	Masago Azemoto	Liberal Democratic	
Chūgoku block	Michiyoshi Yuzuki	Constitutional Democratic	
Chūgoku block	Shunji Yuhara	Constitutional Democratic	
Chūgoku block	Akira Hirabayashi	Kōmeitō	
Chūgoku block	Masayoshi Kusaka	Kōmeitō	
Chūgoku block	Soramoto Seiki	Nippon Ishin no Kai	
=== Shikoku === 11 single-member and 6 proportional representation seats.
==== Tokushima Prefecture ====
Tokushima-1st	Hirobumi Niki	Independent	
Tokushima-2nd	Sunichi Yamaguchi	Liberal Democratic	
==== Kagawa Prefecture ====
Kagawa-1st	Junya Ogawa	Constitutional Democratic	
Kagawa-2nd	Yuchiro Tamaki	DPFP	
Kagawa-3rd	Keitaro Ono	Liberal Democratic	
==== Ehime Prefecture ====
Ehime-1st	Akihisa Shiozaki	Liberal Democratic	
Ehime-2nd	Seiichiro Murakami	Liberal Democratic	
Ehime-3rd	Takumi Ihara	Liberal Democratic	
Ehime-4th	Junji Hasegawa	Liberal Democratic	
==== Kochi Prefecture ====
Kochi-1st	Gen Nakatani	Liberal Democratic	
Kochi-2nd	Masanao Ozaki	Liberal Democratic	
==== Shikoku Block ====
Shikoku block	Yuji Yamamoto	Liberal Democratic	
Shikoku block	Takuya Hirai	Liberal Democratic	
Shikoku block	Masazumi Gotoda	Liberal Democratic	
Shikoku block	Yoichi Shiraishi	Constitutional Democratic	
Shikoku block	Masayasu Yamazaki	Kōmeitō	
Shikoku block	Tomoyo Yoshida	Nippon Ishin no Kai	
=== Kyushu === 35 single-member and 20 proportional representation seats.
==== Fukuoka Prefecture ====
Fukuoka-1st	Takahiro Inoue	Liberal Democratic	
Fukuoka-2nd	Makoto Oniki	Liberal Democratic	
Fukuoka-3rd	Atsushi Koga	Liberal Democratic	
Fukuoka-4th	Hideki Miyauchi	Liberal Democratic	
Fukuoka-5th	Kaname Tsutsumi	Constitutional Democratic	
Fukuoka-6th	Jiro Hatoyama	Liberal Democratic	
Fukuoka-7th	Satoshi Fujimaru	Liberal Democratic	
Fukuoka-8th	Tarō Asō	Liberal Democratic	
Fukuoka-9th	Rintaro Ogata	Independent	
Fukuoka-10th	Takashi Kii	Constitutional Democratic	
Fukuoka-11th	Ryōta Takeda	Liberal Democratic	
==== Saga Prefecture ====
Saga-1st	Kazuhira Haraguchi	Constitutional Democratic	
Saga-2nd	Hiroshi Ogushi	Constitutional Democratic	
==== Nagasaki Prefecture ====
Nagasaki-1st	Hideki Nishioka	DPFP	
Nagasaki-2nd	Ryusho Kato	Liberal Democratic	
Nagasaki-3rd	Yaichi Tanigawa	Liberal Democratic	Resigned 24 January 2024
Nagasaki-4th	Seigo Kitamura	Liberal Democratic	Died 20 May 2023
==== Kumamoto Prefecture ====
Kumamoto-1st	Minoru Kihara	Liberal Democratic	
Kumamoto-2nd	Daisuke Nishino	Independent	
Kumamoto-3rd	Tetsushi Sakamoto	Liberal Democratic	
Kumamoto-4th	Yasushi Kaneko	Liberal Democratic	
==== Oita Prefecture ====
Ōita-1st	Shuji Kira	Independent	
Ōita-2nd	Seishirō Etō	Liberal Democratic	
Ōita-3rd	Takeshi Iwaya	Liberal Democratic	
==== Miyazaki Prefecture ====
Miyazaki-1st	So Watanabe	Constitutional Democratic	
Miyazaki-2nd	Taku Etō	Liberal Democratic	
Miyazaki-3rd	Yoshihisa Furukawa	Liberal Democratic	
==== Kagoshima Prefecture ====
Kagoshima-1st	Takuma Miyaji	Liberal Democratic	
Kagoshima-2nd	Satoshi Mitazono	Independent	
Kagoshima-3rd	Takeshi Noma	Constitutional Democratic	
Kagoshima-4th	Hiroshi Moriyama	Liberal Democratic	
==== Okinawa Prefecture ====
Okinawa-1st	Seiken Akamine	JCP	
Okinawa-2nd	Kunio Arakaki	Social Democratic	
Okinawa-3rd	Aiko Shimajiri	Liberal Democratic	
Okinawa-4th	Kōsaburō Nishime	Liberal Democratic	
==== Kyushu Block ====
Kyūshū block	Masahiro Imamura	Liberal Democratic	
Kyūshū block	Hirotake Yasuoka	Liberal Democratic	
Kyūshū block	Kazuchika Iwata	Liberal Democratic	
Kyūshū block	Shunsuke Takei	Liberal Democratic	
Kyūshū block	Yasushi Furukawa	Liberal Democratic	
Kyūshū block	Konosuke Kuniba	Liberal Democratic	
Kyūshū block	Masahisa Miyazaki	Liberal Democratic	
Kyūshū block	Yasuhiro Ozato	Liberal Democratic	
Kyūshū block	Seiichi Suetsugu	Constitutional Democratic	Resigned 10 October 2023
Kyūshū block	Hajime Yoshikawa	Constitutional Democratic	
Kyūshū block	Katsuhiko Yamada	Constitutional Democratic	Resigned 16 April 2024
Kyūshū block	Shuji Inatomi	Constitutional Democratic	
Kyūshū block	Masakazu Hamaji	Kōmeitō	
Kyūshū block	Yoshida Nobuhiro	Kōmeitō	
Kyūshū block	Yasukuni Kaneshiro	Kōmeitō	
Kyūshū block	Kumiko Yoshida	Kōmeitō	
Kyūshū block	Hiroki Abe	Nippon Ishin no Kai	
Kyūshū block	Takeshi Yamamoto	Nippon Ishin no Kai	
Kyūshū block	Shinji Nagatomo	DPFP	
Kyūshū block	Takaaki Tamura	JCP	

== Changes ==
Date	From		To		Constituency	Reason
8 July 2022	LDP	Shinzo Abe	Vacant		Yamaguchi-4th	Assassinated
1 September 2022	DPP	Shuhei Kishimoto	Vacant		Wakayama-1st	Resigned to run in Wakayama gubernatorial election
19 December 2022	LDP	Kentaro Sonoura	Vacant		Chiba-5th	Resigned due to discrepancies in political funds report
3 February 2023	LDP	Nobuo Kishi	Vacant		Yamaguchi-2nd	Resigned due to illness
23 April 2023	Vacant		LDP	Arfiya Eri	Chiba-5th	Elected in by-elections
23 April 2023	Vacant		Ishin	Yumi Hayashi	Wakayama-1st	Elected in by-elections
23 April 2023	Vacant		LDP	Nobuchiyo Kishi	Yamaguchi-2nd	Elected in by-elections
23 April 2023	Vacant		LDP	Shinji Yoshida	Yamaguchi-4th	Elected in by-elections
20 May 2023	LDP	Seigo Kitamura	Vacant		Nagasaki-4th	Died
4 October 2023	Ishin	Kiyonari Maekawa	Vacant		Kinki block	Resigned after being charged with violating the Public Offices Election Act
10 October 2023	CDP	Kiyonari Maekawa	Vacant		Kyūshū block	Resigned to contest the upcoming Nagasaki-4th by-election
19 October 2023	Vacant		Ishin	Hideki Nakajima	Kinki block	Selected to fill vacancies in PR seats
19 October 2023	Vacant		CDP	Yara Tomohiro	Kyūshū block	Selected to fill vacancies in PR seats
22 October 2023	Vacant		LDP	Yōzō Kaneko	Nagasaki-4th	Elected in by-election
10 November 2023	LDP	Hiroyuki Hosoda	Vacant		Shimane-1st	Died
24 January 2024	LDP	Yaichi Tanigawa	Vacant		Nagasaki-3rd	Resigned over role in the slush fund scandal
1 February 2024	Independent	Mito Kakizawa	Vacant		Tokyo-15th	Resigned over allegations of vote-buying
16 April 2024	CDP	Katsuhiko Yamada	Vacant		Kyūshū block	Resigned to contest the upcoming Nagasaki-3rd by-election
25 April 2024	LDP	Hiroyuki Miyazawa	Vacant		Tokai block	Resigned following admission of affair
25 April 2024	Vacant		CDP	Hiroshi Kawauchi	Kyūshū block	Selected to fill vacancy in PR seat
28 April 2024	Vacant		CDP	Katsuhiko Yamada	Nagasaki-3rd	Elected in by-elections
28 April 2024	Vacant		CDP	Akiko Kamei	Shimane-1st	Elected in by-elections
28 April 2024	Vacant		CDP	Natsumi Sakai	Tokyo-15th	Elected in by-elections
13 May 2024	Vacant		LDP	Yukiko Mori	Tokai block	Selected to fill vacancy in PR seat
