= Katsuhiko Yamada =

Katsuhiko Yamada may refer to:

- Katsuhiko Yamada (baseball)
- Katsuhiko Yamada (politician)
