= Takahide Kimura =

Japanese politician

- 木村 隆秀
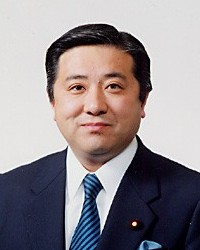
- Official portrait, 2002

Member of the House of Representatives
- In office 9 December 2003 – 21 July 2009
- Preceded by: Hiroshi Kondō
- Succeeded by: Hirotaka Akamatsu
- Constituency: Tōkai PR (2003–2005); Aichi 5th (2005–2009)
- In office 21 October 1996 – 9 November 2003
- Preceded by: Constituency established
- Succeeded by: Multi-member district
- Constituency: Tōkai PR

Member of the Aichi Prefectural Assembly
- In office 1991–1996
- Constituency: Nagoya City Nakagawa Ward
- In office 1983–1987
- Constituency: Nagoya City Nakagawa Ward

Personal details
- Born: 10 August 1955 (age 71) Nakagawa, Nagoya, Aichi, Japan
- Party: Liberal Democratic
- Education: Tokyo Keizai University

Takahide Kimura (木村 隆秀, Kimura Takahide; born 10 August 1955) is a former Japanese politician of the Liberal Democratic Party, who served as a member of the House of Representatives in the Diet (national legislature). A native of Nagoya, Aichi and graduate of Tokyo Keizai University, he was elected to the House of Representatives for the first time in 1996 after having served in the Aichi Prefectural Assembly for three terms since 1983.

House of Representatives (Japan)
New district	Representative for the Tōkai proportional representation block 1996–2003; December 2003–2005 (designated successor for Hiroshi Kondō)	Succeeded by -
Preceded by Hirotaka Akamatsu	Representative for Aichi's 5th district 2005–2009	Succeeded by Hirotaka Akamatsu
