= Aichi 5th district =

Legislative district in Japan

Aichi 5th District
- Parliamentary constituency for the Japanese House of Representatives

- Numbered map of Aichi Prefecture single-member districts
- Prefecture: Aichi
- Proportional District: Tōkai
- Electorate: 350,279 (2022)

Current constituency
- Created: 1994
- Seats: One
- Party: LDP
- Representative: Yasuhiro Okamoto
- Created from: Aichi's 1st, 2nd and 6th "medium-sized" district
- Municipalities: Nagoya's Nakamura and Nakagawa wards City of Kiyosu

Aichi 5th district is a constituency of the House of Representatives in the Diet of Japan (national legislature). It is located in Aichi Prefecture and consists of Nagoya's Nakamura and Nakagawa wards and the city of Kiyosu. As of 2016, 428,423 eligible voters were registered in the district.

Nagoya is considered a "Democratic kingdom" (minshu ōkoku), a stronghold of the Democratic Party of Japan (DPJ). But Aichi's 5th district is the only electoral district in Nagoya (Aichi 1 to 5) that also contains areas outside Nagoya. In the landslide "postal privatization" election of 2005, it became the first district in Nagoya that the long-ruling Liberal Democratic Party (LDP) could win since the introduction of single-member districts in 1996: Liberal Democrat Takahide Kimura won narrowly against the Democratic incumbent Hirotaka Akamatsu who was then only reelected in the Tōkai proportional representation block. Akamatsu had represented Aichi's 5th district since 1996 and regained the seat in the 2009 general election. He was Minister of Agriculture, Forestry and Fisheries in the Hatoyama Cabinet. In 2012, he lost the district by less than 2,000 votes to Liberal Democrat Kenji Kanda. Akamatsu regained the district in 2014 and held it until 2021.

In 2023, Kenji Kanda had to resign from his position as a vice finance minister after admitting his company had failed to pay taxes. Subsequently he lost his seat in the 2024 election.

== List of representatives ==
Representative	Party	Dates	Notes
Hirotaka Akamatsu	DPJ	1996 – 2005	Won in the PR block
Takahide Kimura	LDP	2005 – 2009	Retired
Hirotaka Akamatsu	DPJ	2009 – 2012	Won in the PR block
Kenji Kanda	LDP	2012 – 2014	Won in the PR block
Hirotaka Akamatsu	DPJ	2014 – 2016	
Hirotaka Akamatsu	DP	2016 – 2017	
Hirotaka Akamatsu	CDP	2017 – 2021	
Kenji Kanda	LDP	2021 – 2024	
Atsushi Nishikawa	CDP	2024 – 2026	
Yasuhiro Okamoto	LDP	2026 –	

== Election results ==
2026
Party	Candidate	Votes	%	±%
LDP	Yasuhiro Okamoto	73,643	41.7	▲18.6
Centrist Reform	Atsushi Nishikawa	44,288	25.1	▼9.5
Genzei–Yukoku	Katsuyoshi Tanaka	25,815	14.6	
Sanseitō	Airi Watanabe (elected in Tōkai PR block)	18,970	10.7	
JCP	Hiroyuki Egami	7,487	4.2	▼3.1
Independent	Kenji Kanda	6,487	3.7	
Registered electors		348,674		
Turnout			51.57	▲4.33
LDP gain from Centrist Reform				

2024
Party	Candidate	Votes	%	±%
CDP	Atsushi Nishikawa	54,818	34.6	▼2.0
LDP	Kenji Kanda	36,662	23.1	▼18.1
Ishin	Maki Misaki	33,568	21.2	▼1.0
CPJ	Katsuyoshi Tanaka	22,007	13.9	
JCP	Hiroyuki Egami	11,601	7.3	
Registered electors		348,602		
Turnout			47.24	▼1.39
CDP gain from LDP				

2021
Party	Candidate	Votes	%	±%
LDP	Kenji Kanda (endorsed by Kōmeitō)	84,320	41.2	▲4.1
CDP	Atsushi Nishikawa	74,995	36.6	▼9.9
Ishin	Maki Misaki (elected by PR)	45,540	22.2	
Turnout			48.63	▲1.75
LDP gain from CDP				

2017
Party	Candidate	Votes	%	±%
CDP	Hirotaka Akamatsu	91,081	46.49	▲1.96
LDP	Kenji Kanda (elected by PR, endorsed by Kōmeitō)	72,651	37.08	▼0.78
Kibō no Tō	Naoaki Nonobe (endorsed by Genzei Nippon)	32,179	16.43	N/A
Majority		18,430	9.41	
Turnout			46.88	▼0.60
CDP hold		Swing	▲1.37	

2014
Party	Candidate	Votes	%	±%
Democratic	Hirotaka Akamatsu (endorsed by the Greens)	84,226	44.53	▲13.42
LDP	Kenji Kanda (elected by PR)	71,616	37.86	▲5.89
JCP	Hiroki Fujii	23,069	12.20	▲4.49
Future Generations	Shōichi Yasuda	10,231	5.41	N/A
Majority		12,610	6.57	
Turnout			47.28	▼5.41
Democratic gain from LDP		Swing	▲3.77	

2012
Party	Candidate	Votes	%	±%
LDP	Kenji Kanda	67,218	31.97	▼2.88
Democratic	Hirotaka Akamatsu (elected by PR, endorsed by PNP)	65,423	31.11	▼29.88
Restoration	Ken'ichi Koyama (endorsed by YP)	37,806	17.98	N/A
Tomorrow	Yukichi Maeda (endorsed by NPD)	23,609	11.23	N/A
JCP	Hiroki Fujii	16,206	7.71	N/A
Majority		1,795	0.86	
Turnout			52.69	▼10.9
LDP gain from Democratic		Swing	▲13.50	

2009
Party	Candidate	Votes	%	±%
Democratic	Hirotaka Akamatsu (endorsed by PNP)	158,235	61.99	▲17.54
LDP	Mutsumi Teranishi (endorsed by Kōmeitō)	88,964	34.85	▼13.47
Happiness Realization	Tomoko Yoshida	8,042	3.15	N/A
Majority		69,271	27.14	
Turnout		261,917	63.6	▲2.0
Democratic gain from LDP		Swing	▲15.51	

2005
Party	Candidate	Votes	%	±%
LDP	Takahide Kimura	117,017	48.32	
Democratic	Hirotaka Akamatsu (elected by PR)	107,605	44.45	
JCP	Akemi Kawae	17,523	7.23	
Turnout		246,842	61.6	

2003
Party	Candidate	Votes	%	±%
DPJ	Hirotaka Akamatsu (PR candidate)	104,346		
LDP	Takahide Kimura (PR candidate)	90,668		
JCP	Hiroyuki Egami	16,255		
Turnout		217,109	54.7	

2000
Party	Candidate	Votes	%	±%
DPJ	Hirotaka Akamatsu (PR candidate)	82,943		
LDP	Takahide Kimura (PR candidate)	64,970		
JCP	Asako Kodama	21,516		
LL	Takayoshi Itō	2,274		

1996
Party	Candidate	Votes	%	±%
DPJ	Hirotaka Akamatsu (PR candidate)	48,648		
LDP	Takahide Kimura (PR candidate)	46,485		
NFP	Yutaka Banno	43,028		
JCP	Tadahiro Nagatomo	17,670		
Independent	Tsutomu Suzuki	768		
Japan Nation Party	Minoru Ichikawa	470		
Culture forum (Bunka fōramu)	Takao Uchiyama	335		
