= Shu Watanabe (politician) =

Japanese politician

- 渡辺 周
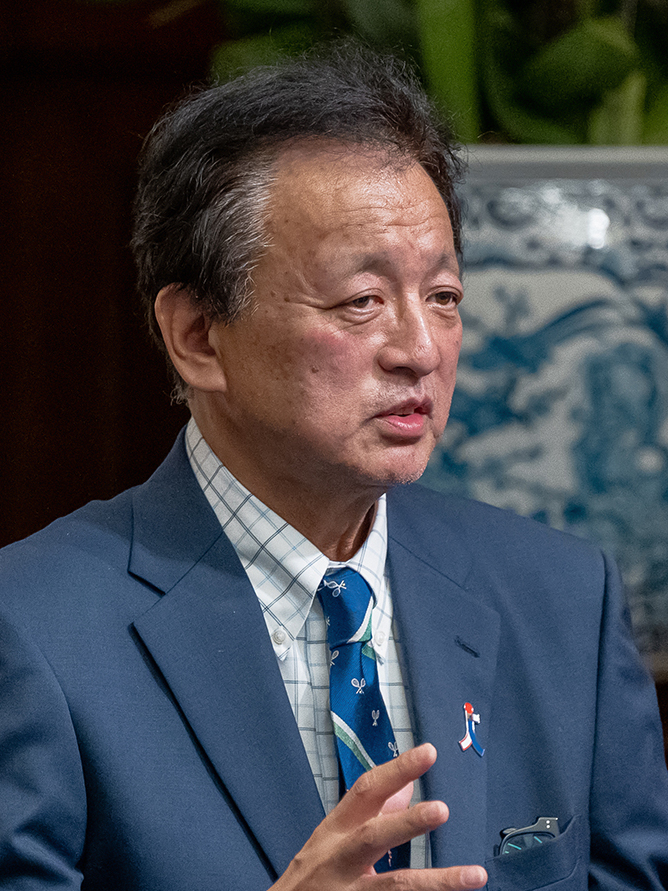
- Watanabe in 2023

Member of the House of Representatives
- In office 22 October 1996 – 23 January 2026
- Preceded by: Constituency established
- Succeeded by: Takaaki Katsumata
- Constituency: Shizuoka 6th (1996–2021); Tōkai PR (2021–2024); Shizuoka 6th (2024–2026)

Member of the Shizuoka Prefectural Assembly
- In office 1991–1996
- Constituency: Numazu City

Personal details
- Born: 11 December 1961 (age 64) Numazu, Shizuoka, Japan
- Party: CRA (since 2026)
- Other political affiliations: DSP (1991–1994); Independent (1994–1996); DP 1996 (1996–1998); DPJ (1998–2016); DP 2016 (2016–2017); KnT (2017–2018); DPP (2018–2020); CDP (2020–2026)
- Relatives: Yoshinori Muto (son-in-law)
- Education: Waseda University

Shu Watanabe (渡辺 周, Watanabe Shū; born 11 December 1961) is a Japanese politician of the Constitutional Democratic Party of Japan, who served as a member of the House of Representatives in the Diet of Japan (national legislature).

== Early life ==
Watanabe is a native of Numazu, Shizuoka and graduated from Waseda University. He worked at the national newspaper Yomiuri Shimbun from 1987 to 1999.

== Political career ==
Watanabe was elected to the first of his two terms in the assembly of Shizuoka Prefecture in 1991 and then to the House of Representatives for the first time in 1996. He served as the representative for the Shizuoka 6th constituency from 1996 to 2021, and again from 2024, and as the Tōkai proportional representation member from 2021 to 2024.

He is an assenter of "The Truth About Nanjing (movie)." He was previously a member of the Kibō no Tō political party, being the party's candidate for Prime Minister, and the Democratic Party of Japan, along with the Democratic Party for the People.

Watanabe is part of the CDP's shadow cabinet 'Next Cabinet' as the shadow Security Minister (replacement to the Minister of Defense).
