= Nagasaki 4th district =

Electoral district in Nagasaki, Japan

Nagasaki Prefecture 4th District
- Former Parliamentary constituency for the Japanese House of Representatives
- Prefecture: Nagasaki
- Proportional District: Kyushu
- Electorate: 250,004 (2021)

Former constituency
- Created: 1994
- Abolished: 2022

Nagasaki 4th District (長崎県第4区, Nagasaki-ken dai-yon-ku) was a single-member electoral district for the House of Representatives, the lower house of the National Diet of Japan. It was located in western Nagasaki and consisted of the cities of Sasebo, Hirado, Matsuura and Saikai, as well as Kitamatsuura District. As of 2021, 250,004 eligible voters were registered in the district.

== List of representatives ==
Representatives	Party	Dates	Notes
Genjirō Kaneko	LDP	1996–1998	Resigned mid-term to run as Governor of Nagasaki.
Daisuke Miyajima	LDP	1998–2000	Lost re-election.
Seigo Kitamura	Independent	2000–2003	Re-elected in 2003.
Seigo Kitamura	LDP	2003–2009	Re-elected in 2005, 2009 in the Kyushu PR block.
Daisuke Miyajima	DPJ	2009–2012	Lost re-election.
Seigo Kitamura	LDP	2012–2023	Re-elected in 2014, 2017, 2021. Died in office.
Vacant (May – October 2023)
Yōzō Kaneko	LDP	2023–2024	Constituency abolished - moved to the 3rd district

== Area covered ==
The district was redrawn twice between its creation in 1994 and its abolition, once in 2013 and once again in 2017. The district was abolished during redistricting in 2022, and the areas it covered as of 2022 were transferred to the 3rd district.

=== Areas 2017–2022 ===
After the 2017 revisions, the areas covered by the district are as follows:

- Sasebo (excluding the Haiki, Mikawachi and Miya Branch Departments)
- Hirado, Nagasaki
- Matsuura, Nagasaki
- Saikai, Nagasaki
- Kitamatsuura District
  - Saza, Nagasaki

Due to the redrawing of the district borders, Ojika, Nagasaki was moved to the 3rd district, while Saikai was gained from the 2nd district.

=== Areas 2013–2017 ===
From the redistricting in 2013 until the redistricting in 2017, the areas covered by the district are as follows:

- Sasebo (excluding the Haiki, Mikawachi and Miya Branch Departments)
- Hirado, Nagasaki
- Matsuura, Nagasaki
- Kitamatsuura District

=== Areas from before 2013 ===
From its formation in 1994, until its first redistricting in 2013, the areas covered by this district were as follows:

- Sasebo
- Hirado
- Matsuura
- Kitamatsuura District

== Election results ==
2023 by-election
Party	Candidate	Votes	%	±%
LDP	Yōzō Kaneko (endorsed by Komeito)	53,915	53.5	▲11.4
CDP	Seiichi Suetsugu (endorsed by Social Democratic Party)	46,899	46.5	▲4.7
Turnout		100,814	42.2	▼12.9
LDP hold				

2021
Party	Candidate	Votes	%	±%
LDP	Seigo Kitamura (incumbent) (endorsed by Komeito)	55,968	42.1	▼8.7
CDP	Seiichi Suetsugu	55,577	41.8	New
Independent	Katsu Hagiwara	16,860	12.7	New
Independent	Ryuji Tanaka	4,765	3.5	New
Turnout		137,702	55.1	▼2.3
LDP hold				

2017
Party	Candidate	Votes	%	±%
LDP	Seigo Kitamura (incumbent) (endorsed by Komeito)	73,899	50.8	▲0.4
Kibō no Tō	Daisuke Miyajima (endorsed by the Democratic Party's Nagasaki Prefectural Branch Federation)	61,137	42.0	New
JCP	Satoru Ishikawa	10,459	7.2	▲2.0
Turnout		150,036	57.4	
LDP hold				

2014
Party	Candidate	Votes	%	±%
LDP	Seigo Kitamura (incumbent) (endorsed by Komeito)	61,533	50.4	▼0.9
Democratic	Daisuke Miyajima	42,690	35.0	▲1.2
People's Life	Seiichi Suetsugu	9,303	7.6	New
JCP	Satoru Ishikawa	6,319	5.2	New
Independent	Takuya Mori	2,268	1.9	New
Turnout				
LDP hold				

2012
Party	Candidate	Votes	%	±%
LDP	Seigo Kitamura (incumbent) (endorsed by Komeito)	81,771	51.3	▲3.3
Democratic	Daisuke Miyajima (incumbent) Endorsed by the PNP)	53,918	33.8	▼16.5
Tomorrow	Seiichi Suetsugu (endorsed by New Party Daichi)	16,860	12.7	New
Independent	Ryuji Tanaka	4,765	3.5	New
Turnout				
LDP gain from Democratic				

2009
Party	Candidate	Votes	%	±%
Democratic	Daisuke Miyajima	97,912	50.3	▲15.3
LDP	Seigo Kitamura (incumbent)	93,428	48.0	▼2.7
Happiness Realization	Kouichi Yamada	3,354	1.7	New
Turnout				
Democratic gain from LDP				

2005
Party	Candidate	Votes	%	±%
LDP	Seigo Kitamura (incumbent)	97,174	50.7	▼10.9
Democratic	Daisuke Miyajima	67,088	35.0	New
Social Democratic	Masami Imagawa	27,240	14.2	▼18.5
Turnout				
LDP hold				

2003
Party	Candidate	Votes	%	±%
LDP	Seigo Kitamura (incumbent)	100,767	61.6	▲28.1
Social Democratic	Masami Imagawa (incumbent - Kyushu)	53,557	32.7	▲11.4
JCP	Takenori Nakao	9,284	5.7	▲0.5
Turnout				
LDP gain from Independent		Swing	▲19.1	

2000
Party	Candidate	Votes	%	±%
Independent	Seigo Kitamura	66,515	35.6	New
LDP	Daisuke Miyajima (incumbent)	62,595	33.5	▼10.1
Social Democratic	Masami Imagawa	39,808	21.3	▲2.2
JCP	Chiaki Yamashita	9,757	5.2	▲2.0
Liberal League	Isseu Akagi	8,312	4.5	New
Turnout				
Independent gain from LDP		Swing	N/A	

1998 by-election
Party	Candidate	Votes	%	±%
LDP	Daisuke Miyajima	86,181	43.6	▼7.2
Liberal	Kuro Matsuda	67,614	34.2	New
Social Democratic	Shoji Yoshimura	37,697	19.1	New
JCP	Hideki Shimizu	6,282	3.2	▼0.4
Turnout				
LDP hold		Swing	N/A	

1996
Party	Candidate	Votes	%	±%
LDP	Genjiro Kaneko (incumbent)	95,117	50.4	New
New Frontier	Kuro Matsuda	56,403	29.9	New
Democratic	Izumi Yamazaki (incumbent)	29,424	15.6	New
JCP	Takenori Nakao	7,092	3.8	New
Liberal League	Keiji Fujinami	825	0.4	New
Turnout				
LDP win (new seat)				
