= 2024 Japanese by-elections =

2024 parliamentary by-elections in japan

On April 28, 2024, by-elections in Japan were held in order to fill vacancies in the National Diet of Japan. In the October 27 slot, there was one national by-election for the Iwate senate seat in the 2022 class after Megumi Hirose (LDP→independent) resigned.

== Summary ==
Constituency	House	Outgoing MP	Before party	Reason	Member elected	After party
Nagasaki 3rd district	House of Representatives	Yaichi Tanigawa	Independent (Note: Resigned from the LDP following his indictment related to the slush fund scandal.)	Resigned on 24 January 2024	Katsuhiko Yamada	CDP
Shimane 1st district	House of Representatives	Hiroyuki Hosoda	LDP	Died on 10 November 2023	Akiko Kamei	CDP
Tokyo 15th district	House of Representatives	Mito Kakizawa	Independent (Note: Resigned from the LDP over allegations of vote-buying.)	Resigned on 1 February 2024	Natsumi Sakai	CDP
Iwate at-large district	House of Councillors	Megumi Hirose	Independent (Note: Resigned from the LDP following an admission she had fraudulently paid salaries to a secretary who performed no duties.)	Resigned on 15 August 2024	Eiji Kidoguchi	CDP

== Elections ==
=== Tokyo 15th district ===
Tokyo 15th district, as seen within Tokyo Prefecture. (While Tokyo's 15th district remains unchanged, the other districts shown will only become effective in the next general House of Representatives election.)

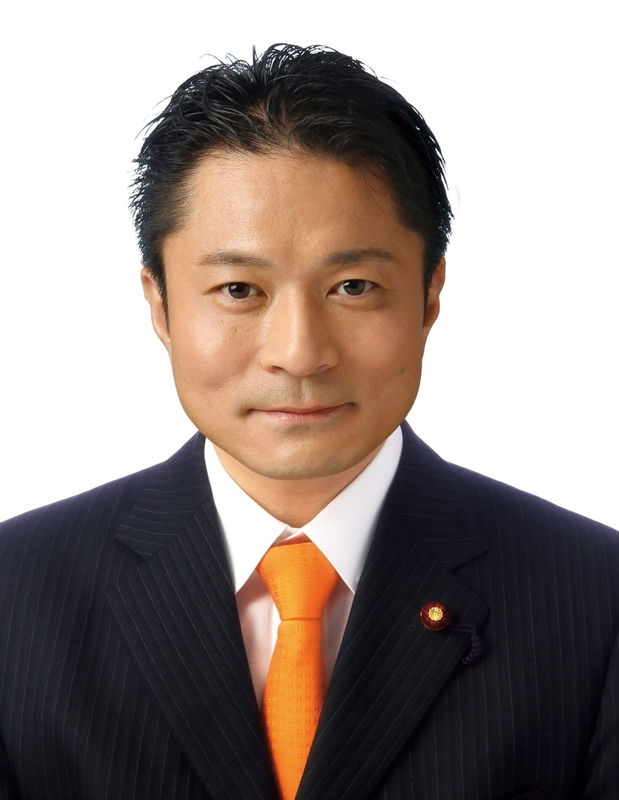
Former Representative Mito Kakizawa

Mito Kakizawa, who has run for and been elected (proportionally in 2009 and 2021) in every election since 2009, was indicted for illegal financing during a Tokyo mayoral election. He resigned soon after, leaving the seat open for a by-election. Four political parties have nominated candidates, all of which are listed below. The field grew to seven candidates in late March.

- Yui Kanazawa is running with the support of Nippon Ishin no Kai, as party leader Nobuyuki Baba announced on February 1. Kanazawa was already announced as the Ishin candidate for the district in the next general election. She is a former office worker.
- Akari Iiyama is running with the support of the Conservative Party of Japan, the first ever by-election for the party. She is a visiting professor at the Reitaku University Center for International Studies.
- Rina Yoshikawa received the endorsement of Sanseitō. She works as a nurse. She was also already announced as the candidate for the party in the next general election.
- Former House of Representative member Tsukasa Akimoto is planning to run in the by-election. He has stated his intent to seek recognition from the LDP. He did not receive support.
- Natsumi Sakai is planning to running with the support of the Constitutional Democratic Party of Japan. Sakai formerly ran for the Kōtō mayoral election in December 2023, but lost. Kenta Izumi has stated his intent to collaborate with the Japanese Communist Party in support of Sakai.
- Hirotada Ototake is running with the support of First no Kai. Ototake is known for his autobiography, No One's Perfect. The LDP did not endorse him. Komeito has been resistant to back him. The Democratic Party for the People endorsed him.
- Genki Sudo, who serves as a political independent in the House of Councilors but was elected with support from the CDP, announced his intention to run as an independent on 2 April.
- Ryosuke Nemoto, who serves as secretary-general of Tsubasa Party, a small, right-wing anti-American party, is running with the support of the party. He announced his candidacy on 8 April.
- Katsuya Fukunaga, who works as a lawyer, was announced as the candidate for the NHK Party. His campaign was focused on restructuring welfare, along with internet harassment. He announced his candidacy on 13 April.

Additionally, three other people have been rumored, or have planned previously, to run.

- Yuriko Koike, current Governor of Tokyo and former Kibō no Tō and LDP member, has been continuously rumored to have interest in the by-election. She has stated that "The answer is the same as always. The budget is currently being deliberated by the Tokyo Metropolitan Government and the Tokyo Metropolitan Assembly. We are working hard to advance the Tokyo Metropolitan Government." It has been similarly stated that the local LDP branch wishes to cooperate with Governor Koike, especially due to the current precarious stance of Prime Minister Fumio Kishida's low approval ratings.
- Mari Takahashi had originally planned to run for the Democratic Party for the People, but following the confirmation of the possibility of legal issues in her financing and registration, canceled its endorsement. Takahashi withdrew.
- Higashi Kozutsumi was announced as the Japanese Communist Party candidate on February 13. Kozutsumi currently serves as party chair for the Kōtō District Committee. He was already announced as the JCP candidate for the district in the next general election. He dropped out after the JCP and CDP had come to an agreement to support Sakai.

The LDP were resistant to field a candidate. The LDP had previously began searching for a candidate, but paused, stating that "adjustments were needed." It also stated its expectation in support from Yuriko Koike and Komeito. The CDP has stated interest in fielding a candidate, and did so in late March, nominating Natsumi Sakai. Eventually, on 2 April, party secretary Toshimitsu Motegi announced that it would not field a candidate, instead endorsing Hirotada Ototake, citing the slush fund scandal as potentially wounding the chance of LDP candidates. With the LDP refusing to endorse a candidate, they have effectively lost the by-election by default. Polling has shown a slight, but consistent, CDP lead, with Kanazawa finishing second and Ototake finishing third. The candidate of Koike finishing third could signal a decline in her influence.

==== Results and analysis ====
Sakai won the election with 28.98% of the vote, a clear plurality of over ten points against her closest opponent, Genki Sudo, who finished second in what was considered a somewhat surprising result for him. He was only backed by Reiwa Shinsengumi and its party leader, Taro Yamamoto. The Conservative Party of Japan also captured a strong percentage of the vote for its first showing in an election, with its candidate placing above the recommended Tomin First no Kai candidate for the fourth spot. Sakai's victory was mainly reasoned on her strong support from the CDP, Japanese Communist Party, and independents in the area.

The result was considered disappointing for Nippon Ishin no Kai, which wished to finish at least second. Party leader Nobuyuki Baba stated "It's a very difficult situation to win in single-seat constituencies outside of Kansai."

A large reason for the severe loss of Hirotada Ototake, who was backed by a number of forces (including influential Governor Yuriko Koike's local force and the Democratic Party for the People) was chalked up to the divide in governmental forces, particularly with Komeito and local LDP forces. Ototake had gone through a myriad of scandals (including a revelation that he had an affair), and, furthermore, had refused to back the LDP in the Koto mayoral election which had occurred late last year, which also saw a split between Koike and the LDP. Additionally, Komeito had large reservations, mainly circled around the fact they had not been consulted in his recommendation. Neither of the parties ended up recommending him, with Komeito letting its members freely vote.

The result also led to the resignation of the DPP regional branch chief.

=== Shimane 1st district ===
Shimane 1st district, as seen within Shimane Prefecture

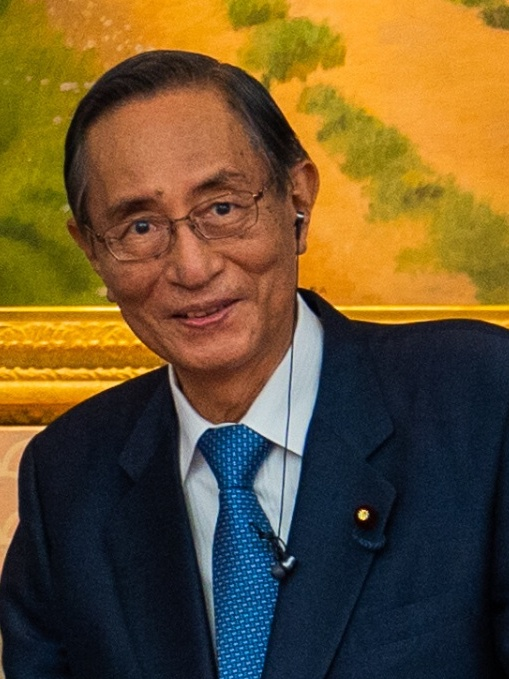
Former Representative Hiroyuki Hosoda

Hiroyuki Hosoda, who served as Speaker of the House of Representatives, announced his intention to resign due to health problems, and stepped down in September. He died a little over a month later. He has represented the district since the first introduction of FPTP districts in 1996, and previously served Shimane in a multimember district starting from 1990. Shimane is viewed as an LDP stronghold. Two candidates have registered for the by-election.

- The Liberal Democratic Party Shimane Prefecture Federation publicly recruited candidates in December 2023. Fumishiro Sakurauchi, a former member of the House of Representatives, and Koumasa Nishikori, a former director of the China Finance Bureau, filed for motions to run. On January 16, 2024, the prefectural federation decided to support Nishikori. On January 24, the party headquarters decided to officially recognize Nishikori.
- Akiko Kamei was announced as the Constitutional Democratic Party of Japan's candidate on January 9, 2024. The Democratic Party for the People Prefectural Branch endorsed her on January 27. Party leader Yuichiro Tamaki supported the move. The SDP announced it would support her on March 22.

Additionally, there was two other candidates who have since dropped out, or did not make the ballot.

- Eriko Muraho, a former high school teacher and member of the Japan Communist Party Shimane Prefecture Committee, applied for recognition from the Japanese Communist Party. He was also named the candidate for the constituency's next election. He initially received recognition to run in the by-election, but support was withdrawn on March 18, 2024, after the Prefectural Committee of the JCP decided it would instead unify around Kamei instead. He voluntarily supported Kamei.
- Nobuo Sasaki, an 85 year old who serves as chairman of a social welfare corporation in Yamaguchi Prefecture, announced his intention to run on February 29. He applied for recognition from the Conservative Party of Japan. He failed to submit his candidacy by the notification date.

Where as Shimane is usually extremely loyal to the LDP brand, with neither of its two seats having elected a single opposition member since the electoral reform took place in 1996, the LDPs power in the prefecture has waned due to extreme controversy faced by Hiroyuki Hosoda, who is alleged to have been involved in sexual harassment and to have also dealt with the Unification Church.

Furthermore, with the death of Noboru Takeshita and Wataru Takeshita, who both held strong sway over the politics inside the prefecture, the LDP has struggled to deal with the consequences. The CDP also believe in the potential seat as a flip, and believe it to serve as a bellwether for the next general election; Kenta Izumi, Katsuya Okada and Yukio Edano have traveled to the district to drum up support Kamei's candidacy. LDP party secretary Toshimitsu Motegi has stated that it will not run a candidate in either of the two other by-elections occurring concurrently, citing its want to focus on the contest in the district. Polling has shown a narrow, but consistent, lead in favor of Kamei.

==== Results and analysis ====
Despite it being the only district where the LDP had chosen to run a candidate, Kamei won with 58.82% of the vote, over fifteen points ahead of Nishikori. There were a large number of reasons given for the defeat, mainly that the 2023–2024 Japanese slush fund scandal, which previous representative Hiroyuki Hosoda, who was head of the Seiwa Seisaku Kenkyūkai for a seven years, was thought to possibly be involved in.

Another reason for the loss was chalked up to a disconnect between two warring factions inside the LDP branch of the prefecture, mainly those centered around the former representative, Hosoda, and the other focused on former Prime Minister of Japan and his family, Noboru Takeshita and Wataru Takeshita. The two factions failed to properly coordinate on a campaign, with the Takeshita group attempting to distance themselves from Hosoda while the Hosoda faction continued to bring him up. One supporter of the Takeshita faction said "If you want support from the people of the prefecture, you shouldn't bring up Hosoda. What are you thinking?"

Kamei was also able to capture a secure amount of opposition support as well as independents (exit polls said she had won around 70% of independents exactly), and even captured nearly 30% of LDP voters. The LDP voter base also dwindled in general; people who listed the LDP as their main party had gone down to 37%, compared to 50% in 2021. The result made it the first time ever that the opposition had won a seat in Shimane since the introduction of FPTP districts.

=== Nagasaki 3rd district ===
Nagasaki 3rd district inside Nagasaki Prefecture from the next general House of Representatives election

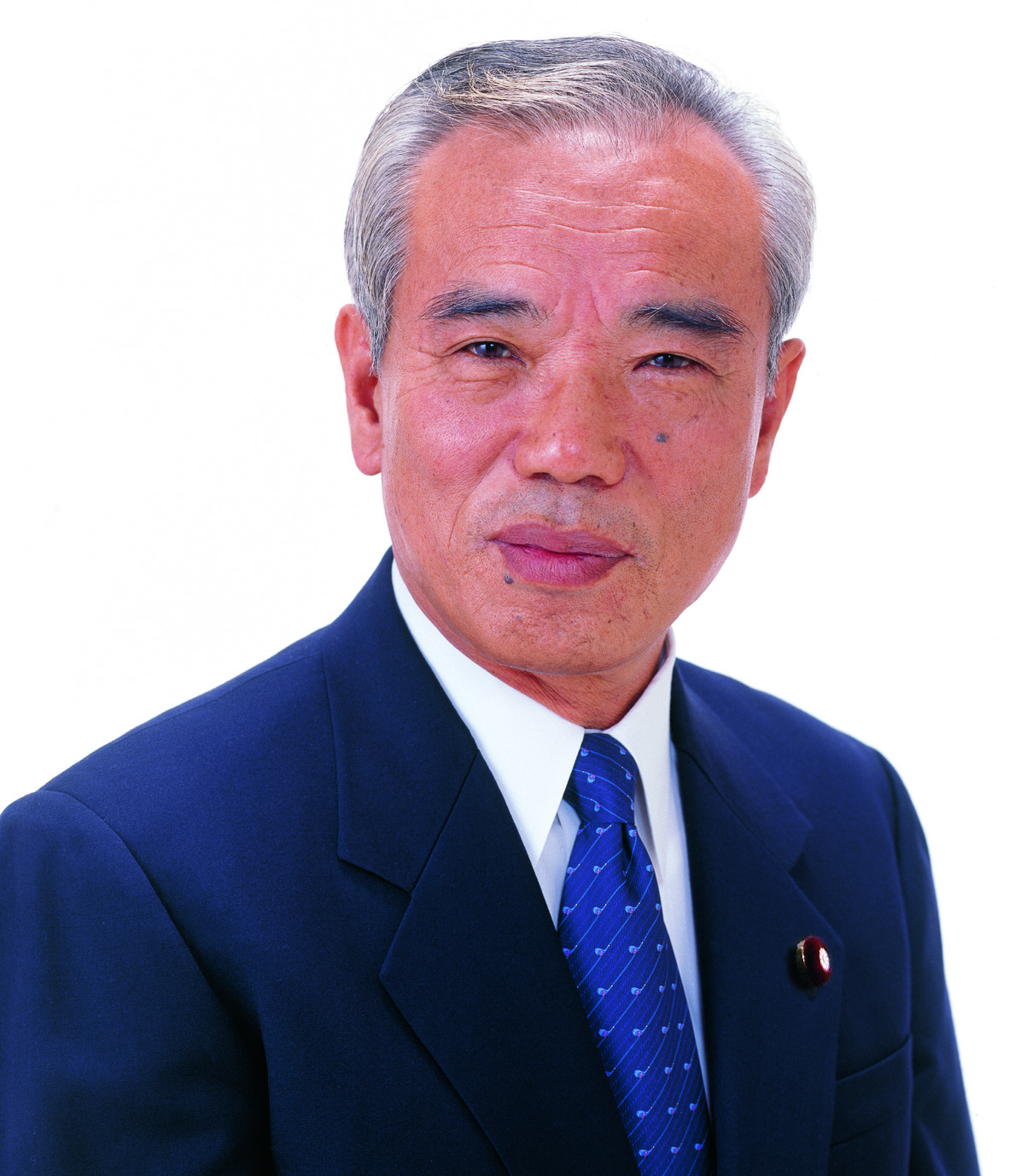
Former Representative Yaichi Tanigawa

Yaichi Tanigawa, who represented the district from 2003 onward (with exception for 2009, where he was elected proportionally), was indicted by Tokyo Police for receiving over ¥40 million in kickbacks from the Seiwa Seisaku Kenkyūkai. He resigned on 19 January, and left the LDP.

So far, two candidates have been announced.

- Katsuhiko Yamada, who serves as a member of the House of Representatives for the Kyushu proportional representation block, was announced as the Constitutional Democratic Party of Japan candidate for the by-election on January 30. On February 13, the Nagasaki Prefectural Committee Japanese Communist Party branch announced its support of Yamada. The Social Democratic Party endorsed Yamada on February 21. The Nagasaki Prefectural branch of the Democratic Party for the People endorsed Yamada on March 5, in a move backed once again by party leader Yuichiro Tamaki.
- Shoichiro Inoue was nominated by Nippon Ishin no Kai. He runs a cram school. He was endorsed by FEFA.

The LDP has yet to field a candidate. There has been controversy inside the party on if to field one or not; Nagasaki 3rd is set to be eliminated at the next election due to reapportionment of districts, and Tanigawa's scandal has severely damaged the image of the party inside the district. Chairman of the Nagasaki Prefectural Federation, Yuichiro Koga, and Secretary-General of the Liberal Democratic Party Toshimitsu Motegi have met on several occasions to discuss the possibility of sitting out the election, with Motegi reportedly in support of sitting out and Koga willing to follow the party line. It has been reported that Prime Minister Fumio Kishida has been reluctant to side with Motegi, due to murmurs of Motegi wanting to take down Kishida and his faction going into the future. The party has yet to make an official statement. Party secretary Toshimitsu Motegi confirmed that it would not run a candidate, citing the fact the district would be eliminated, and also due to the wish to focus on the contest in Shimane 1st. Polling is limited due to the odd nature surrounding the district, but Yamada has been shown as leading over Inoue.

==== Results and analysis ====
Yamada won the election with 68.36% of the vote. Voter turnout was incredibly low, at just 35.45%. Analysis is generally hard to gather, but suggestion has been put forward that Ishin has faced continuous difficulties in its goal to pass the CDP as primary leader of the opposition, and expanding out of Kansai in SMDs. Baba stated that he would continue not to cooperate with the CDP or any other opposition forces.

=== Iwate at-large district ===
Location of Iwate Prefecture

The Iwate at-large district by-election for the House of Councillors was scheduled for 27 October 2024 after incumbent Megumi Hirose resigned on 15 August following an admission she had fraudulently paid salaries to a secretary who performed no duties.

==== Results and analysis ====
The seat was won by Eiji Kidoguchi of the CDP.

== See also ==
- Elections in Japan
