= Masahiko Yamada =

Japanese politician

- 山田 正彦
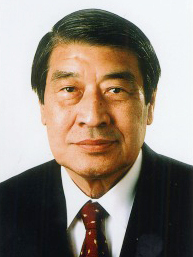
- Official portrait, 2009

Minister of Agriculture, Forestry and Fisheries
- In office 8 June 2010 – 17 September 2010
- Prime Minister: Naoto Kan
- Preceded by: Hirotaka Akamatsu
- Succeeded by: Michihiko Kano

Member of the House of Representatives
- In office 25 June 2000 – 16 November 2012
- Preceded by: Multi-member district
- Succeeded by: Yaichi Tanigawa
- Constituency: Kyushu PR (2000–2009); Nagasaki 3rd (2009–2012)
- In office 19 July 1993 – 27 September 1996
- Preceded by: Akira Mitsutake
- Succeeded by: Constiturncy abolished
- Constituency: Nagasaki 2nd

Personal details
- Born: 8 April 1942 (age 84) Fukue, Nagasaki, Japan
- Party: Independent
- Other political affiliations: LDP (1979–1990); JRP (1993–1994); NFP (1994–1997); Liberal (1998–2003); DPJ (2003–2012); TPJ (2012); Green Wind (2013)
- Children: Katsuhiko Yamada
- Education: Waseda University

Masahiko Yamada (山田 正彦, Yamada Masahiko; born 8 April 1942) is a Japanese politician who served as a member of the House of Representatives in the Diet (national legislature) between 1993 and 1996, and between 2003 and 2012. A native of Fukue, Nagasaki, a Roman Catholic, and graduate of Waseda University, he was elected to the House of Representatives for the first time in 1993 after unsuccessful runs in 1979, 1986 and 1990. Before running for office, he worked as a rancher and a lawyer.

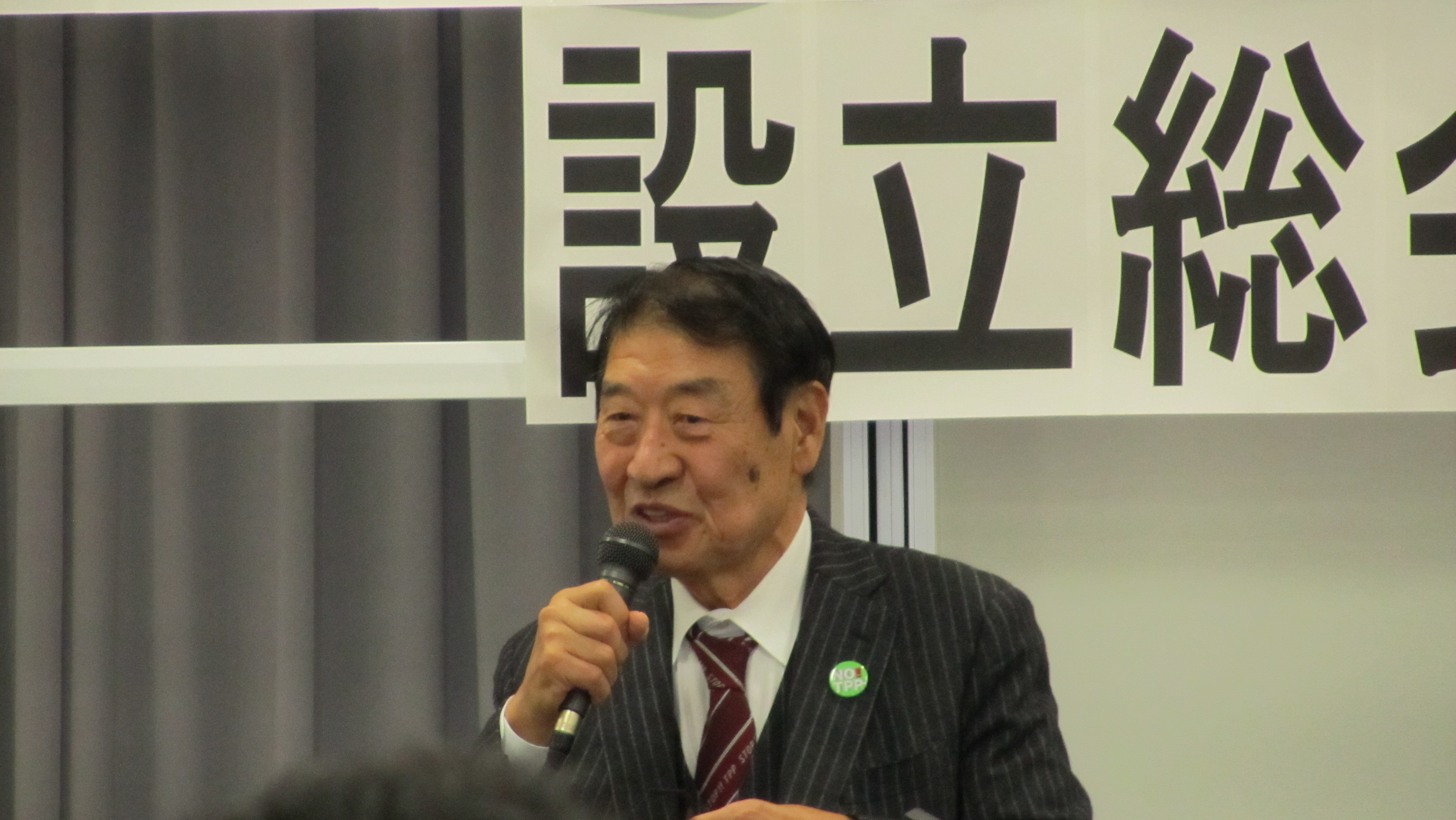
Yamada in 2015

Political offices
Preceded by Hirotaka Akamatsu	Minister of Agriculture, Forestry and Fisheries; 2010	Succeeded by Michihiko Kano
Preceded by Motohiko Kondō; Noritoshi Ishida	Senior Vice Minister of Agriculture, Forestry and Fisheries; 2009–2010; Served alongside: Akira Gunji	Succeeded by Akira Gunji; Takashi Shinohara
House of Representatives (Japan)
Preceded by Yaichi Tanigawa	Representative for Nagasaki 3rd district 2009–2012	Succeeded by Yaichi Tanigawa
Preceded by –	Representative for the Kyūshū PR block 2000–2009	Succeeded by –
Preceded by Isao Hayami; Genjirō Kaneko; Akira Mitsutake; Kazuo Torashima	Representative for Nagasaki 2nd district (multi-member); 1993–1996; Served alongside: Genjirō Kaneko, Kazuo Torashima, Izumi Yamazaki	District eliminated
