= Hirotaka Akamatsu =

Japanese politician

- 赤松 広隆
- Official portrait, 2009

Vice Speaker of the House of Representatives
- In office 1 November 2017 – 14 October 2021
- Speaker: Tadamori Oshima
- Preceded by: Tatsuo Kawabata
- Succeeded by: Banri Kaieda
- In office 26 December 2012 – 21 November 2014
- Speaker: Bunmei Ibuki
- Preceded by: Seishirō Etō
- Succeeded by: Tatsuo Kawabata

Minister of Agriculture, Forestry and Fisheries
- In office 16 September 2009 – 8 June 2010
- Prime Minister: Yukio Hatoyama
- Preceded by: Shigeru Ishiba
- Succeeded by: Masahiko Yamada

Member of the House of Representatives; from Tōkai
- In office 18 February 1990 – 14 October 2021
- Preceded by: Iwao Andō
- Succeeded by: Kenji Kanda
- Constituency: See list: Aichi 6th (1990–1996); Aichi 5th (1996–2005); PR block (2005–2009); Aichi 5th (2009–2012); PR block (2012–2014); Aichi 5th (2014–2021)

Member of the Aichi Prefectural Assembly
- In office 30 April 1979 – 26 January 1990
- Constituency: Nagoya City Nakamura Ward

Personal details
- Born: 3 May 1948 (age 78) Nagoya, Aichi, Japan
- Party: CDP (since 2017)
- Other political affiliations: JSP (1966–1996); SDP (1996); DP 1996 (1996–1998); DPJ (1998–2016); DP 2016 (2016–2017)
- Parent: Isamu Akamatsu (father)
- Education: Waseda University
- Website: go-akamatsu.com

Hirotaka Akamatsu (赤松 広隆, Akamatsu Hirotaka; born 3 May 1948) is a Japanese politician from the Constitutional Democratic Party of Japan, a former minister and Vice Speaker of the House of Representatives of Japan.

== Life and career ==
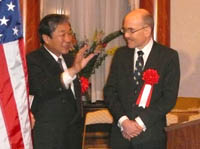
Akamatsu with James P. Zumwalt in 2010

A native of Nagoya and graduate of Waseda University, he was elected to the first of his three terms in the Aichi Prefectural Assembly and then to the House of Representatives for the first time in 1990 as a member of the Japan Socialist Party.

He was appointed Minister of Agriculture in 2009. In April 2010, he skipped the traditional visit by legislators to Ise Jingu, opting instead to take a holiday in Mexico with his wife. While he was on vacation, Japan suffered a large outbreak of foot-and-mouth disease. His response to the outbreak was widely criticized and the Ministry of Agriculture apologized on his behalf on 31 May. The Hatoyama government collapsed in June and Akamatsu was not reappointed.

Akamatsu was the Vice Speaker of the House of Representatives between 2012 and 2014 and again between 2017 and 2021.

Political offices
Preceded by Shigeru Ishiba	Minister of Agriculture, Forestry and Fisheries of Japan; 2009–2010	Succeeded by Masahiko Yamada
Party political offices
Preceded by Tatsuo Kawabata	Chairman of the DPJ Diet Affairs Committee; 2000–2001	Succeeded by Hiroshi Kumagai
New political party	Chairman of the DPJ Diet Affairs Committee; 1996–1997	Succeeded by Junsuke Iwata
Preceded by Sadao Yamahana	Secretary-General of the Japan Socialist Party; 1993	Succeeded by Wataru Kubo
House of Representatives (Japan)
Preceded by Kenji Kanda	Representative for Aichi's 5th district 2014–2021	Succeeded by Kenji Kanda
Preceded by -	Representative for the Tōkai proportional representation block 2012–2014	Succeeded by -
Preceded by Takahide Kimura	Representative for Aichi's 5th district 2009–2012	Succeeded by Kenji Kanda
Preceded by -	Representative for the Tōkai proportional representation block 2005–2009	Succeeded by -
New district	Representative for Aichi's 5th district 1996–2005	Succeeded by Takahide Kimura
Preceded by Saburō Tsukamoto; Takeshi Kataoka; Kōshirō Ishida; Iwao Andō	Representative for Aichi's 6th district (multi-member); 1990–1996; Served alongside: Kōshirō Ishida, Tadao Ōtani, Takeshi Kataoka, Saburō Tsukamoto	District eliminated
