= Akira Mitsutake =

Japanese politician (1931–2025)

- 光武 顕
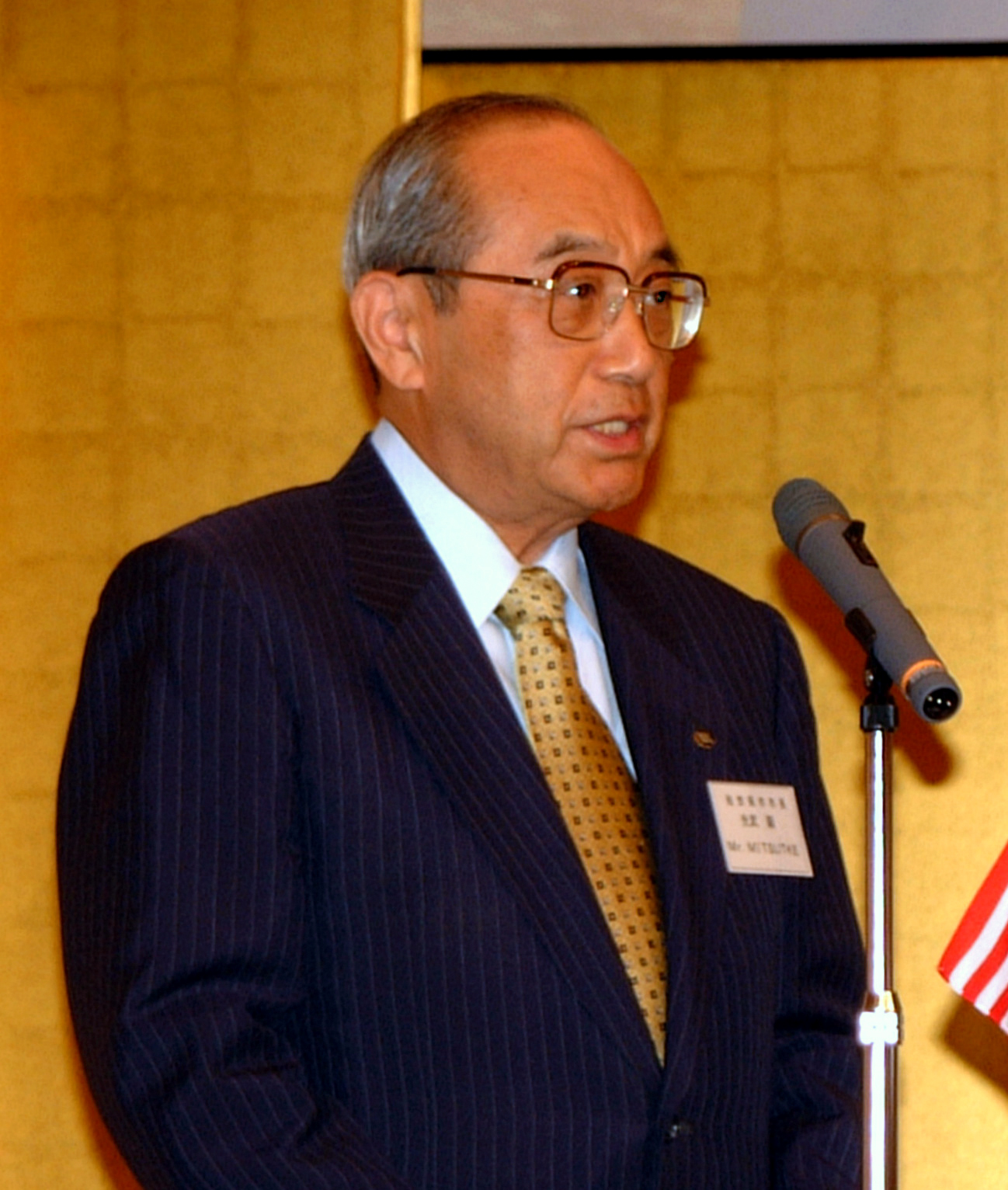
- Mitsutake in 2001

Mayor of Sasebo
- In office 30 April 1995 – 29 April 2007
- Preceded by: Kumashi Kakehashi
- Succeeded by: Norio Tomonaga

Member of the House of Representatives
- In office 18 February 1990 – 18 June 1993
- Preceded by: Kurō Matuda
- Succeeded by: Masahiko Yamada
- Constituency: Nagasaki 2nd

Personal details
- Born: 27 March 1931 Qingdao, China
- Died: 19 December 2025 (aged 94) Tokyo, Japan
- Party: Liberal Democratic
- Education: University of Tokyo
- Occupation: Civil servant

Akira Mitsutake (Japanese: 光武顕 Mitsutake Akira; 27 March 1931 – 19 December 2025) was a Japanese politician. A member of the Liberal Democratic Party, he served in the House of Representatives from 1990 to 1993.

Mitsutake died in Tokyo on 19 December 2025 at the age of 94.
