= Nagasaki 3rd district =

Japanese electoral district

Nagasaki 3rd District
- 長崎県第3区
- Parliamentary constituency for the Japanese House of Representatives
- Prefecture: Nagasaki
- Proportional Block: Kyushu
- Electorate: 352,396 (as of 1 September 2023)

Current constituency
- Created: 1994
- Seats: One
- Party: LDP
- Representative: Yōzō Kaneko

Nagasaki 3rd district (長崎[県第]3区, Nagasaki[-ken dai-]sanku) is a single-member electoral district of the Japanese House of Representatives, the lower house of the National Diet. It is located in the prefecture of Nagasaki and covers northern parts of the prefecture on the main island of Kyūshū and the Gotō Islands. Most of the population lives in or around the city of Sasebo.

== History ==
Before the electoral reform of 1994, the area had formed part of the four-member Nagasaki 2nd district. Two of the last representatives from the pre-reform 2nd district, Kazuo Torashima (LDP) and Masahiko Yamada (JRP), contested the new single-member 4th district in 1996. Torashima won, he was appointed defence minister in the 2nd Mori Cabinet in 2000. In the 2003 election, he retired and was succeeded by Yaichi Tanigawa. In the landslide election of 2009, Yamada won the district for the first time. Tanigawa regained the seat in 2012, and held it until he resigned in 2024 due to his involvement in the 2023–2024 Japanese slush fund scandal.

In September 2011, 211,289 eligible voters were registered in Nagasaki 3rd district, giving it the second highest vote weight in the country. Due to reapportionment, Nagasaki lost one seat in 2022 and the boundaries of the district changed significantly. Only Higashisonogi District, the Gotō Islands and a part of Sasebo remained in the 3rd. All other municipalities were transferred to the 3rd from the abolished Nagasaki 4th district.

The former incumbent of the 4th district, Yōzō Kaneko, won the district in 2024. Kaneko is from a long established political family in the area; his father, Genjirō Kaneko, was a Governor of Nagasaki Prefecture and a cabinet minister, and his grandfather, Iwazō Kaneko, was Minister of Agriculture in the First Nakasone Cabinet.

== Area ==
=== Kyūshū Island ===
- Sasebo
- Hirado
- Matsuura
- Saikai
- Saza Town
- Towns of Higashisonogi District

=== Gotō Islands ===
- Gotō
- Shin-Kamigotō Town
- Ojika Town

== List of representatives ==
Election	Representative	Party	Notes
1996	Kazuo Torishima	Liberal Democratic	
2000	Kazuo Torishima	Liberal Democratic	
2003	Yaichi Tanigawa	Liberal Democratic	
2005	Yaichi Tanigawa	Liberal Democratic	
2009	Masahiko Yamada	Democratic	
2009	Masahiko Yamada	Tax Cuts Japan	
2009	Masahiko Yamada	Tomorrow	
2012	Yaichi Tanigawa	Liberal Democratic	Resigned in 2024
2014	Yaichi Tanigawa	Liberal Democratic	Resigned in 2024
2017	Yaichi Tanigawa	Liberal Democratic	Resigned in 2024
2021	Yaichi Tanigawa	Liberal Democratic	Resigned in 2024
2021	Yaichi Tanigawa	Independent	Resigned in 2024
Vacant (January 2024 - April 2024)
2024 by-el	Katsuhiko Yamada	CDP	Moved to the 2nd district
2024	Yōzō Kaneko	LDP	Moved from the 4th district
2026	Yōzō Kaneko	LDP	Moved from the 4th district

== Election results ==
Note: The decimals stem from anbunhyō, see Elections in Japan.

2026
Party	Candidate	Votes	%	±%
LDP	Yōzō Kaneko	133,418	72.1	▲21.2
Centrist Reform	Kōta Tasaki	51,525	27.9	▼10.5
Registered electors		338,797		
Turnout			56.44	▲3.51
LDP hold				

2024
Party	Candidate	Votes	%	±%
LDP	Yōzō Kaneko	90,930	50.9	
CDP	Seiichi Suetsugu	68,494	38.3	
Ishin	Shōichirō Inoue	19,217	10.8	
Turnout			52.93	
LDP gain from CDP				

2024 by-election
Party	Candidate	Votes	%	±%
CDP	Katsuhiko Yamada (Endorsed by SDP)	53,381	68.4	
Ishin	Shōichirō Inoue	24,709	31.6	
Turnout		231,747	35.45	
CDP gain from Independent				

2021
Party	Candidate	Votes	%	±%
LDP	Yaichi Tanigawa (Incumbent) (Endorsed by Komeito)	57,223	40.7	▼19.0
CDP	Katsuhiko Yamada (Elected to Kyushu PR district)	55,189.084	39.2	
Independent	Hiroshi Yamada	25,566.906	18.2	
Reform Party	Hiroyuki Ishimoto	2,750	2.0	
Turnout		114,115	60.93	
LDP hold				

2017
Party	Candidate	Votes	%	±%
LDP	Yaichi Tanigawa Incumbent) (Endorsed by Komeito)	83,992	59.7	▼12.5
Kibō no Tō	Seiichi Suetsugu	35,554	25.3	
JCP	Kanji Ishimaru	12,638	9.0	▼18.8
Ishin	Ryuzo Kuchiishi	8,469	6.0	
Turnout		145,360	59.96	
LDP hold				

2014
Party	Candidate	Votes	%	±%
LDP	Yaichi Tanigawa (Incumbent) (Endorsed by Komeito)	82,354	72.2	▲18.7
JCP	Kanji Ishimaru	31,650	27.8	▲21.5
Turnout		123,460	51.58	
LDP hold				

2012
Party	Candidate	Votes	%	±%
LDP	Yaichi Tanigawa (Endorsed by Komeito)	69,903	53.5	▲5.1
Tomorrow	Masahiko Yamada (elected in Kyūshū proportional) (Endorsed by New Party Daichi)	52,536	40.2	New
JCP	Kanji Ishimaru	8,301	6.3	
Turnout			63.98	N/A
LDP gain from Democratic				

2009
Party	Candidate	Votes	%	±%
Democratic	Masahiko Yamada (Endorsed by PNP)	79,223	49.6	▲2.6
LDP	Yaichi Tanigawa (elected in Kyūshū proportional) (Endorsed by Komeito)	77,316	48.4	▼4.6
Happiness Realization	Kiyoto Yamada	3,263	2.0	
Turnout		162,924	76.57	New
Democratic gain from LDP		Swing		

2005
Party	Candidate	Votes	%	±%
LDP	Yaichi Tanigawa (Incumbent)	83,992	53.0	▲2.7
Democratic	Masahiko Yamada (elected in Kyūshū proportional)	74,384	47.0	▲0.8
Turnout		162,422	74.71	
LDP hold				

2003
Party	Candidate	Votes	%	±%
LDP	Yaichi Tanigawa (Incumbent)	77,528	50.3	▲0.5
Democratic	Masahiko Yamada (elected in Kyūshū proportional)	71,099	46.2	▲27.7
JCP	Toshiyuki Terada	5,374	3.5	
Turnout		157,533	72.5	▼0.2
LDP hold				

2000
Party	Candidate	Votes	%	±%
LDP	Kazuo Torashima	76,794	49.8	▼2.4
Liberal	Masahiko Yamada (elected in Kyūshū proportional)	41,995	27.2	New
Democratic	Tadashi Inuzuka	28,589	18.5	N/A
JCP	Masayoshi Hisano (?, 久野正義)	5,759	3.7	▼1.5
Liberal League	Kan Nakano (?, 沖野寛)	1,079	0.7	
Turnout				
LDP hold				

1996
Party	Candidate	Votes	%	±%
LDP	Kazuo Torashima	79,735	52.2	
New Frontier	Masahiko Yamada	65,084	42.6	
JCP	Yūji Sasada	7,883	5.2	
Turnout		157,516	74.29	
LDP win (new seat)				
