= Katsuhiko Yamada (baseball) =

Japanese baseball player (born 1969)

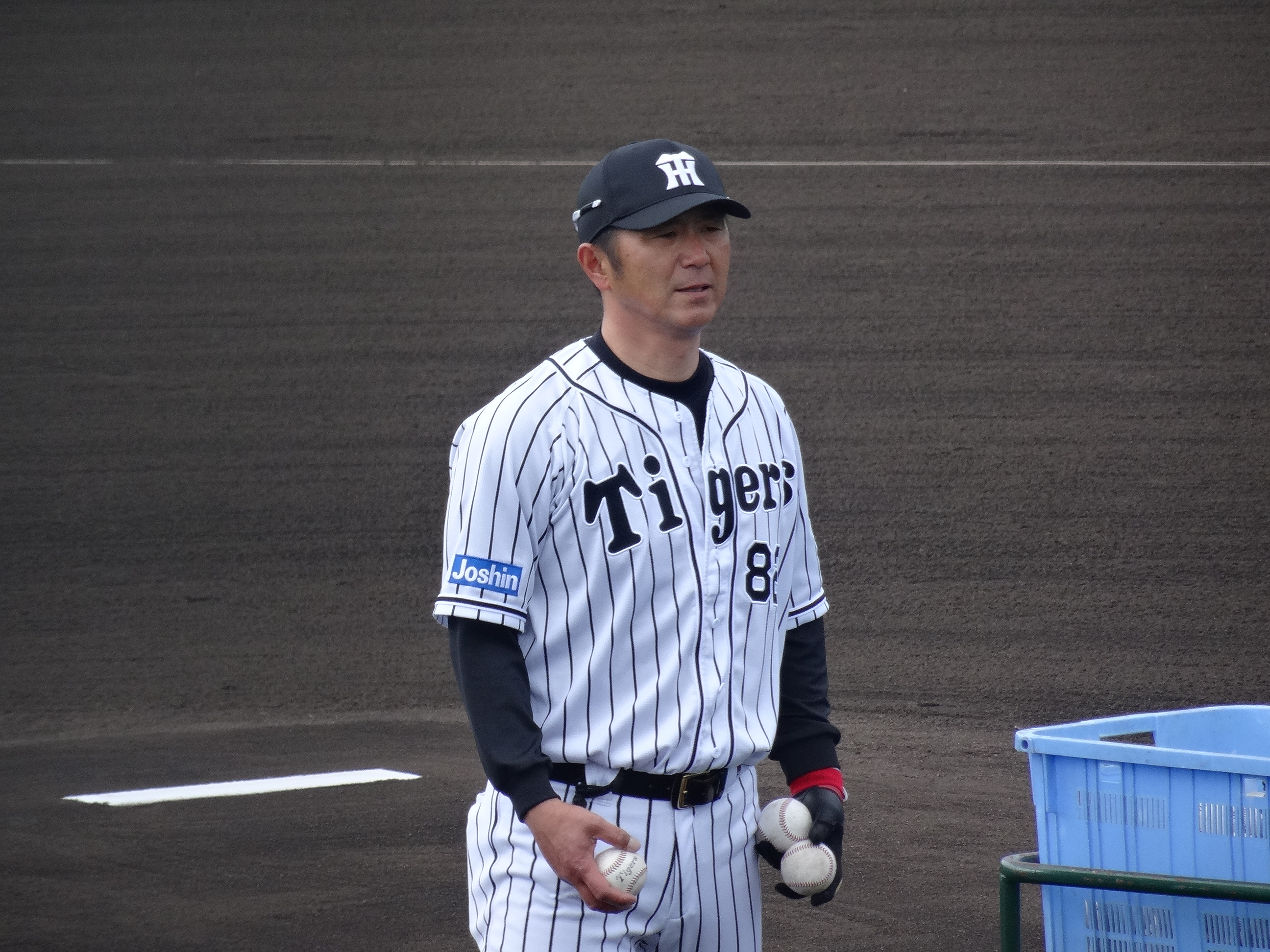

Hokkaido Nippon Ham Fighters – No. 72
- Catcher / Coach
- Born: July 2, 1969 (age 56); Nagoya, Aichi, Japan
- Batted: Right Threw: Right

NPB debut
- October 15, 1989, for the Hanshin Tigers

Last appearance
- April 5, 2005, for the Hokkaido Nippon-Ham Fighters

NPB statistics
- Batting average: .205
- Hits: 360
- Home runs: 21
- Runs batted in: 130
- Stolen base: 3
- Stats at Baseball Reference

Teams
- As player: Hanshin Tigers (1988–2002); Nippon-Ham Fighters/Hokkaido Nippon-Ham Fighters (2003–2005); As coach: Tohoku Rakuten Golden Eagles (2006–2010); Orix Buffaloes (2011–2012); Hanshin Tigers (2013–2021); Hokkaido Nippon-Ham Fighters (2022–present)

Katsuhiko Yamada (山田 勝彦, Yamada Katsuhiko; born July 2, 1969 in Nagoya, Aichi Prefecture) is a retired Japanese professional baseball catcher.
