= Katsuhiko Yamada (politician) =

Japanese politician (born 1979)

- 山田 勝彦
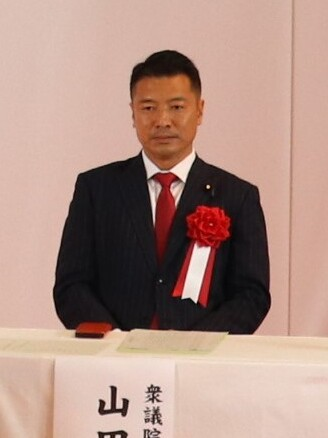
- Yamada in 2025

Member of the House of Representatives
- In office 1 May 2024 – 23 January 2026
- Preceded by: Yaichi Tanigawa
- Succeeded by: Multi-member district
- Constituency: Nagasaki 3rd (2024); Kyushu PR (2024–2026)
- In office 5 November 2021 – 16 April 2024
- Preceded by: Multi-member district
- Succeeded by: Hiroshi Kawauchi
- Constituency: Kyushu PR

Personal details
- Born: 19 July 1979 (age 47) Ōmura, Nagasaki, Japan
- Party: CRA (since 2026)
- Other political affiliations: CDP (2021–2026)
- Parent: Masahiko Yamada (father)
- Education: Hosei University

Katsuhiko Yamada (山田 勝彦) (born 19 July 1979) is a Japanese politician of the Constitutional Democratic Party of Japan. He was elected to the National Diet of Japan for Nagasaki 3rd district in a 2024 by-election. He is a candidate in Nagasaki 2nd district in the 2026 Japanese general election.

== See also ==
- List of current members of the House of Representatives of Japan
- Representatives elected in the 2021 Japanese general election
