= Shizuoka 6th district =

Legislative district of Japan

Shizuoka 6th District
- Parliamentary constituency for the Japanese House of Representatives
- Numbered map of Shizuoka Prefecture single-member districts
- Prefecture: Shizuoka
- Proportional District: Tōkai
- Electorate: 434,785

Current constituency
- Created: 1994
- Seats: One
- Party: LDP
- Representative: Takaaki Katsumata
- Municipalities: Numazu, Atami, Itō, Shimoda, Izu, Izunokuni, Kamo District and Shimizu and Nagaizumi in Suntō District

Shizuoka 6th district (静岡県第6区, Shizuoka-ken dai-rokku or simply 静岡6区, Shizuoka-rokku) is a single-member constituency of the House of Representatives in the national Diet of Japan located in Shizuoka Prefecture.

== List of representatives ==
Election	Representative	Party	Dates	Notes
1996	Shu Watanabe	DPJ	1996 – 1998	
1996	Shu Watanabe	DPJ	1998 – 2016	
2000	Shu Watanabe	DPJ	1998 – 2016	
2003	Shu Watanabe	DPJ	1998 – 2016	
2005	Shu Watanabe	DPJ	1998 – 2016	
2009	Shu Watanabe	DPJ	1998 – 2016	
2012	Shu Watanabe	DPJ	1998 – 2016	
2014	Shu Watanabe	DPJ	1998 – 2016	
2014	Shu Watanabe	DP	2016 – 2017	
2014	Shu Watanabe	Kibō	2017 – 2018	
2017	Shu Watanabe	Kibō	2017 – 2018	
2017	Shu Watanabe	DPP	2018 – 2020	
2017	Shu Watanabe	CDP	2020 – 2021	
2021	Takaaki Katsumata	LDP	2021 – 2024	
2024	Shu Watanabe	CDP	2024 – 2026	
2026	Takaaki Katsumata	LDP	2026 –	

== Election results ==
2026
Party	Candidate	Votes	%	±%
LDP	Takaaki Katsumata	125,829	54.58	▲10.16
Centrist Reform	Shu Watanabe	84,726	36.75	▼9.51
Sanseitō	Yasunori Kurumado	19,972	8.66	
Registered electors		415,778		
Turnout		230,527	56.37	▲1.92
LDP gain from Centrist Reform				

2024
Party	Candidate	Votes	%	±%
CDP	Shu Watanabe	104,022	46,3	▲2.2
LDP	Takaaki Katsumata (elected in Tōkai PR block)	100,088	44.4	▼1.7
Reiwa	Kōsuke Tomitani	21,003	9.3	
Registered electors		422,874		
Turnout			54.45	▲0.68
CDP gain from LDP				

2021
Party	Candidate	Votes	%	±%
LDP	Takaaki Katsumata (Incumbent-Tōkai-PR)	104,178	46.09	▲0.34
CDP	Shu Watanabe (Incumbent) (elected by Tōkai-PR)	99,758	44.14	New
Ishin	Kōki Yamashita	22,086	9.77	New
Registered electors		425,131		
Turnout			53.77	▼1.12

2017
Party	Candidate	Votes	%	±%
Kibō	Shu Watanabe (Incumbent)	108,788	46.02	New
LDP	Takaaki Katsumata (Incumbent-Tōkai-PR) (reelected by Tōkai-PR)	108,157	45.75	▲2.07
JCP	Yutaka Uchida	19,455	8.23	▲0.46
Registered electors		438,156		
Turnout			54.89	▲0.01

2014
Party	Candidate	Votes	%	±%
DPJ	Shu Watanabe (Incumbent)	114,161	48.55	▲2.96
LDP	Takaaki Katsumata (Incumbent-Tōkai-PR) (reelected by Tōkai-PR)	102,714	43.68	▲2.85
JCP	Tatsuhiko Sato	18,276	7.77	▲2.11
Registered electors		437,772		
Turnout			54.88	▼4.29

2012
Party	Candidate	Votes	%	±%
DPJ	Shu Watanabe (Incumbent)	116,084	45.59	▼20.94
LDP	Takaaki Katsumata (elected by Tōkai-PR)	103,967	40.83	▲9.32
TP	Yūta Hiyoshi［ja〕	20,169	7.92	New
JCP	Masahiko Iguchi	14,423	5.66	▼0.58
Registered electors		443,795		
Turnout			59.17	▼8.26

2009
Party	Candidate	Votes	%	±%
DPJ	Shu Watanabe (Incumbent)	197,688	66.53	▲13.96
LDP	Masatoshi Kurata (Incumbent-Tōkai PR)	93,644	31.51	▼9.68
HRP	Keizō Kato	5,831	1.96	New
Registered electors		450,065		
Turnout			67.43	▲1.26

2005
Party	Candidate	Votes	%	±%
DPJ	Shu Watanabe (Incumbent)	154,542	52.57	▲2.65
LDP	Masatoshi Kurata (Incumbent-Tōkai-PR) (reelected by Tōkai-PR)	121,089	41.19	▲4.15
JCP	Kazuhiko Suzuki	18,346	6.24	▲0.79
Registered electors		453,424		
Turnout			66.17	▲4.49

2003
Party	Candidate	Votes	%	±%
DPJ	Shu Watanabe (Incumbent)	136,066	49.92	▼3.43
LDP	Hiroyasu Kurihara (Incumbent-Tōkai-PR)	100,955	37.04	▼2.53
Indep.	Junichi Hirata	20,675	7.59	New
JCP	Kazuhiko Suzuki	14,867	5.45	▼2.14
Registered electors		453,690		
Turnout			61.68	▼3.21

2000
Party	Candidate	Votes	%	±%
DPJ	Shu Watanabe	115,223	53.35	New
LDP	Mitsuo Sakurada	85,458	39.57	▲10.74
JCP	Masahiko Iguchi	13,428	7.59	▼0.55
LL	Yoshihisa Ōhira	1,864	0.86	▼1.54
Registered electors		339,947		
Turnout			64.89	▲5.08

1996
Party	Candidate	Votes	%	±%
DPJ	Shu Watanabe	60,609	31.56	New
Indep.	Mitsuo Sakurada	55,840	29.07	New
LDP	Hiroyasu Kurihara	55,374	28.83	New
JCP	Takayuki Nakata	15,626	8.14	New
LL	Kazumi Kondo	4,615	2.40	New
Registered electors		331,509		
Turnout			59.81	

== See also ==
- List of districts of the House of Representatives of Japan
