= Yaichi Tanigawa =

Japanese politician

- 谷川 弥一
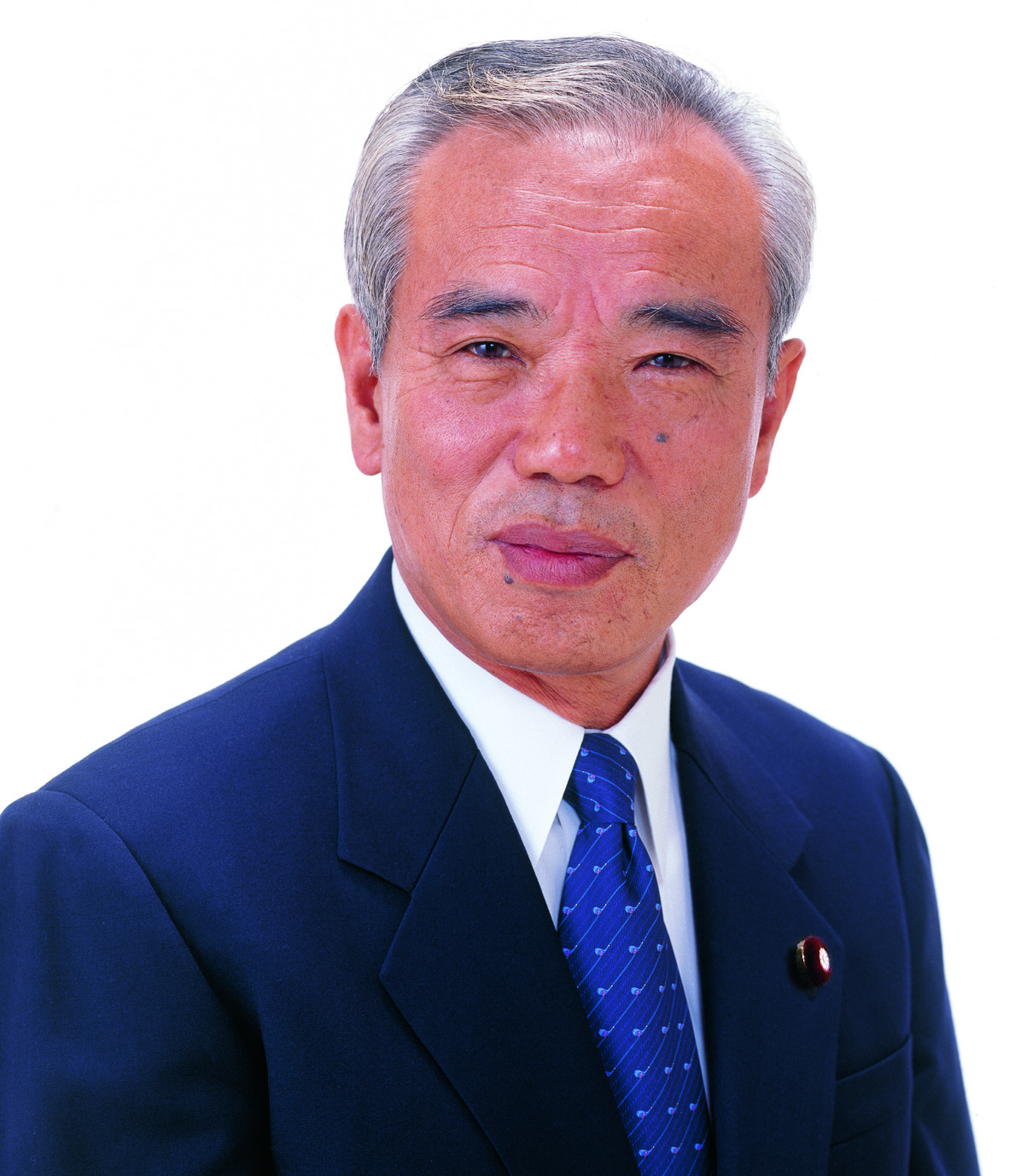
- Official portrait, 2007

Member of the House of Representatives
- In office 9 November 2003 – 24 January 2024
- Preceded by: Kazuo Torashima
- Succeeded by: Katsuhiko Yamada
- Constituency: Nagasaki 3rd (2003–2009); Kyushu PR (2009–2012); Nagasaki 3rd (2012–2024)

Member of the Nagasaki Prefectural Assembly
- In office 1987–2003
- Constituency: Nagasaki City

Personal details
- Born: 12 August 1941 (age 84) Gotō, Nagasaki, Japan
- Party: Independent
- Other political affiliations: Liberal Democratic (until 2024)
- Website: www.tanigawa81.jp

Yaichi Tanigawa (谷川 弥一, Tanigawa Yaichi; born 12 August 1941) is a Japanese politician who served in the House of Representatives between 2003 and 2024. He served as a member of the Liberal Democratic Party until 2024.

In January 2024, amidst a slush fund scandal involving LDP politicians, he was summarily indicted on charges of failing to disclose political kickbacks. He resigned from the LDP and the House of Representatives following the indictment.

== Early life and career ==
Yaichi Tanigawa was born 12 August 1941 in the city of Gotō, and is a graduate of Nagasaki Higashi High School. He served in the Nagasaki Prefecture assembly from 1999 to 2003, and founded Tanigawa Kensetsu Co., later serving as chairman of both the corporation and the assembly.

== Political career ==
Tanigawa was first elected as a member of the House of Representatives from the Liberal Democratic Party in the 2003 Japanese general election, replacing Kazuo Torashima as representative from Nagasaki 3rd district. He narrowly defeated Democratic Party of Japan candidate Masahiko Yamada, who was elected in the Kyushu proportional representation block. Tanigawa was re-elected against Yamada in 2005 before losing his seat to Yamada in 2009. This time, Tanigawa was elected to the Kyushu PR block. He was later re-elected to Nagasaki 3rd district.

Prior to his resignation from the LDP during the 2023–2024 Japanese slush fund scandal, Tanigawa was a member of the Seiwa Seisaku Kenkyūkai, closely associated with Prime Minister Shinzo Abe. After his resignation, a by-election was held to replace Tanigawa on 28 April 2024, and was won by Katzuhiko Yamada of the Constitutional Democratic Party of Japan.

== Controversy ==
=== Korea remarks ===
In May 2019 Tanigawa acquired attention after complaining of his frustration regarding the construction of the Nishi Kyushu Shinkansen, comparing negotiations over the project to "dealing with South or North Korea." Following public backlash, he apologised for his remarks.

=== Slush fund scandal ===
On 9 January 2024, amidst a broader scandal in the LDP, allegations began to emerge that Tanigawa had received ¥40 million in kickbacks from the Seiwa Seisaku Kenkyūkai, along with his secretary. On 16 January he stated to party leadership that he intended to resign from the House of Representatives if he was indicted. Three days later, after he was formally indicted by Tokyo Police (alongside Yasutada Ōno) for violating the Political Funds Control Act, Tanigawa announced his resignation from the LDP and publicly apologised. He resigned from the House of Representatives on 24 January.

== Further information ==
- 政治家情報 〜谷川 弥一〜. JANJAN ザ･選挙 (in Japanese).
