= Seigo Kitamura =

Japanese politician (1947–2023)

- 北村 誠吾
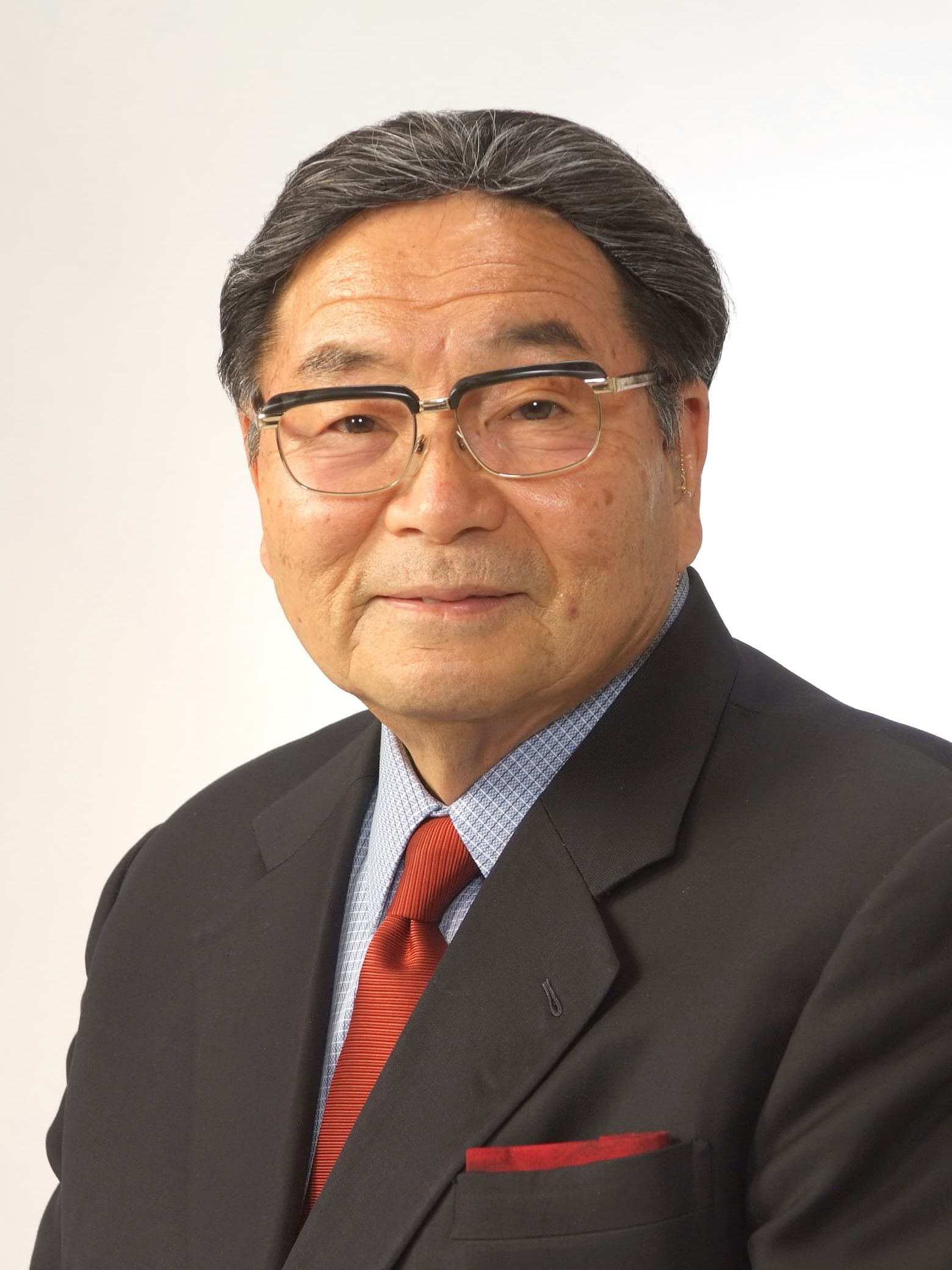
- Official portrait, 2014

Member of the House of Representatives
- In office 25 June 2000 – 20 May 2023
- Preceded by: Daisuke Miyajima
- Succeeded by: Yozo Kaneko
- Constituency: Nagasaki 4th (2000–2009); Kyushu PR (2009–2012); Nagasaki 4th (2012–2023)

Member of the Nagasaki Prefectural Assembly
- In office 1987–2000
- Constituency: Kitamatsuura District

Member of the Sasebo City Council
- In office 1983–1986

Personal details
- Born: 29 January 1947 Ojika, Nagasaki, Japan
- Died: 20 May 2023 (aged 76) Tokyo, Japan
- Party: Liberal Democratic
- Education: Waseda University

Seigo Kitamura (北村 誠吾, Kitamura Seigo; 29 January 1947 – 20 May 2023) was a Japanese politician of the Liberal Democratic Party (LDP), who served as a member of the House of Representatives in the Diet (national legislature).

== Early life ==
Kitamura was a native of Ojika, Nagasaki and graduated from Waseda University.

== Political career ==
Kitamura ran unsuccessfully for the assembly of Nagasaki Prefecture in 1982 but served in the assembly of Sasebo, Nagasaki in the following year. In 1986 he ran unsuccessfully for the House of Representatives as an independent.

After having served in the assembly of Nagasaki Prefecture for four terms from 1987, he was elected to the House of Representatives for the first time in 2000 as an independent in Nagasaki's 4th District. He later joined the LDP.

Kitamura served as the minister of state from 11 September 2019 to 16 September 2020.

== Death ==
Kitamura died in Tokyo on 20 May 2023, at the age of 76.

== Sources ==
- 政治家情報 〜北村 誠吾〜 (in Japanese). JANJAN. Archived from the original on 25 October 2007.

House of Representatives (Japan)
Preceded by Akinori Eto	Chair, Lower House Committee on Security; 2014–2016	Succeeded by Akira Sato
House of Councillors
Preceded by Koichi Yamamoto	Chair, Upper House Special Committee on Okinawa and Northern Problems; 2010–2011	Succeeded by Teru Fukui
Political offices
Preceded by Akinori Eto	State Minister of Defense; 2008–2009	Succeeded by Kazuya Shimba
