= Yozo Kaneko =

Japanese politician (born 1983)

- 金子 容三
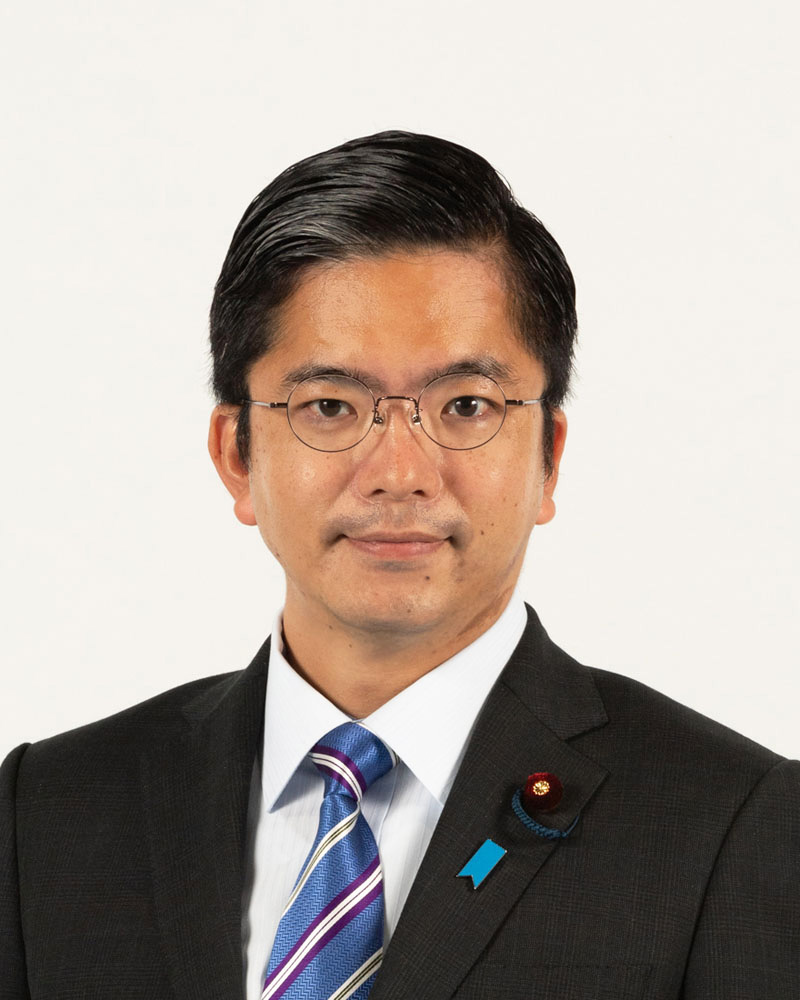
- Official portrait, 2024

Member of the House of Representatives
- Incumbent
- Assumed office 24 October 2023
- Preceded by: Seigo Kitamura
- Constituency: Nagasaki 4th (2023–2024); Nagasaki 3rd (2024–present)

Personal details
- Born: 1 February 1983 (age 43) Nagasaki, Japan
- Party: Liberal Democratic
- Parent: Genjirō Kaneko (father)
- Relatives: Iwazo Kaneko (grandfather)
- Education: Keio University; College of William & Mary

Yozo Kaneko (金子容三, Kaneko Yozo; born 1 February 1983) is a Japanese politician serving as a member of the House of Representatives since 2023. He is the son of Genjirō Kaneko and the grandson of Iwazo Kaneko.
