= Japan Nation Party =

Japan Nation Party 国民党 (日本)
- Founded: 12th Monday 1988
- Headquarters: Zip 105-0013 Hamamatsu-cho 2-2-15, Minato-ku, Tokyo Diamond Heights 5F
- Ideology: Nationalism

The Japan Nation Party (国民党, kokumin-tō) is a minor nationalist party in Japan that was founded in 1988. As of 2026, it is not represented in the chamber of the Diet of Japan.

== Political ideology ==
The Japan Nation Party is on the political right. It promotes nationalism and wants Japan to become a "true national power". The party's stated goals are to "enrich people's freedom", show "respect for human rights", and promote "social equilibrium".

== Political activities ==
The party has taken part in Japanese upper house elections since 1992 and in lower house elections since 1993. In 1991, it ran Sakae Shirai (志良以 榮, Shirai Sakae) as its candidate for Governor of Tokyo. As of 2026, Shirai is currently the party president.
