= Mikawachi =

Locale in Sabeso, Japan

Mikawachi (三川内) is a place in the city of Sasebo in Nagasaki Prefecture, Japan. It is near Arita. Mikawachi is the home of the blue and white Mikawachi ware.

Mikawachi Station (三河内駅) on the Sasebo Line serves the area.
