= Takaaki Katsumata =

Japanese politician (born 1976)

- 勝俣 孝明
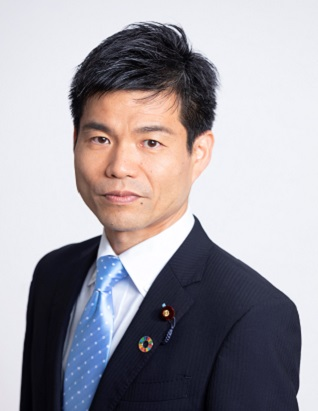
- Official portrait, 2022

Member of the House of Representatives
- Incumbent
- Assumed office 21 December 2012
- Constituency: Tōkai PR (2012–2021); Shizuoka 6th (2021–2024); Tōkai PR (2024–2026); Shizuoka 6th (2026–present)

Personal details
- Born: 7 April 1976 (age 50) Numazu, Shizuoka, Japan
- Party: Liberal Democratic
- Education: Gakushuin University (BEc); Keio University (MBA)

Takaaki Katsumata (勝俣孝明, Katsumata Takaaki; born 7 April 1976) is a Japanese politician serving as a member of the House of Representatives since 2012. From 2023 to 2024, he served as chairman of the foreign affairs committee.
