= 2023–2024 Japanese slush fund scandal =

Political corruption scandal in Japan

Beginning in November 2023, a scandal involving the misuse of campaign funds by members of the Centre-right to Far-right Liberal Democratic Party of Japan's conservative Seiwa Seisaku Kenkyūkai and Shisuikai factions became public after it was revealed the faction had failed to report over ¥600 million in campaign funds and stored them in illegal slush funds.

The scandal has had profound effects on the LDP and Japanese politics as a whole. The LDP's response to the scandal saw all of the party's internal factions (except for Shikōkai) formally disbanding themselves, significantly reshaping the party’s internal dynamics. Several LDP lawmakers, including incumbents Yasutada Ōno and Yaichi Tanigawa, were indicted and subsequently resigned from the party. Amid sustained public backlash, the LDP lost its majorities in both the 2024 general election and the 2025 House of Councillors election. Further, in October 2025, the party’s junior coalition partner Komeito ended its 26-year alliance with the LDP, citing dissatisfaction with the party's handling of the scandal under new president Sanae Takaichi.

== Background ==
The Liberal Democratic Party has been the dominant party in Japanese politics since its formation in 1955. The dominance of the LDP, referred to popularly as the 1955 System, has only been interrupted twice: between 1993 and 1994, as a result of corruption scandals and the end of the Japanese asset price bubble, and from 2009 to 2012 as a result of continuing economic crisis during the Lost Decades. The LDP later recovered both times: in 1994 by forming a coalition with the Japan Socialist Party, and in 2012.

The LDP has numerous factions, but since 2012 has been dominated by the right-wing Seiwa Seisaku Kenkyūkai, also referred to as the Seiwakai or Abe faction. Formerly led by Shinzo Abe (for whom it is nicknamed), the Seiwakai continued to wield significant influence even after Abe resigned as Prime Minister in 2020. Prime Minister Fumio Kishida is a member of the liberal Kōchikai faction, which competes with the Seiwakai for influence. Other factions include the Shisuikai, or Nikai faction, led by Toshihiro Nikai; the Shikōkai, led by Tarō Asō; and the Heisei Kenkyūkai, led by Toshimitsu Motegi, among others.

Following the assassination of Shinzo Abe in 2022, the LDP's popularity was significantly shaken after the extent of political influence by the Unification Church new religious movement was revealed. Kishida reshuffled his cabinet on 10 August 2022 in an attempt to purge UC-associated ministers from the government and regain popular support, but public scrutiny continued over remaining cabinet officials with connections to the church, and support for Kishida's government dropped by a further 16% according to polls conducted by the Mainichi Shimbun newspaper.

Amidst continuing unpopularity, Kishida again reshuffled his cabinet on 13 September 2023, promising change. The new cabinet was primarily noted by The Japan Times as having a relatively high number of women in official positions, as well as including members of rival factions in high-ranking positions ahead of a leadership election within the LDP in 2024. The Japan Times assessed that the placement of Heisei Kenkyūkai leader Motegi as Secretary-General of the Liberal Democratic Party was a measure to reduce his ability to criticise Kishida, while Shikōkai member Taro Kono was appointed as Minister for Digital Transformation despite controversy regarding his handling of an Individual Number Card data breach. Important Seiwakai members Kōichi Hagiuda and Hirokazu Matsuno retained their cabinet positions, as did Shikōkai leader Asō.

== Scandal ==
Cabinet members forced to resign as a result of the scandal

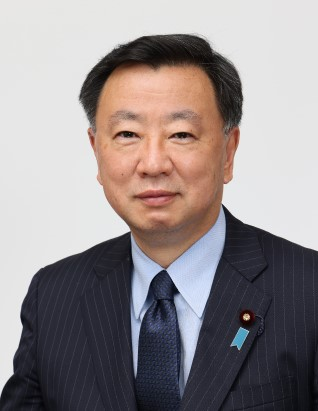
Hirokazu Matsuno, Chief Cabinet Secretary

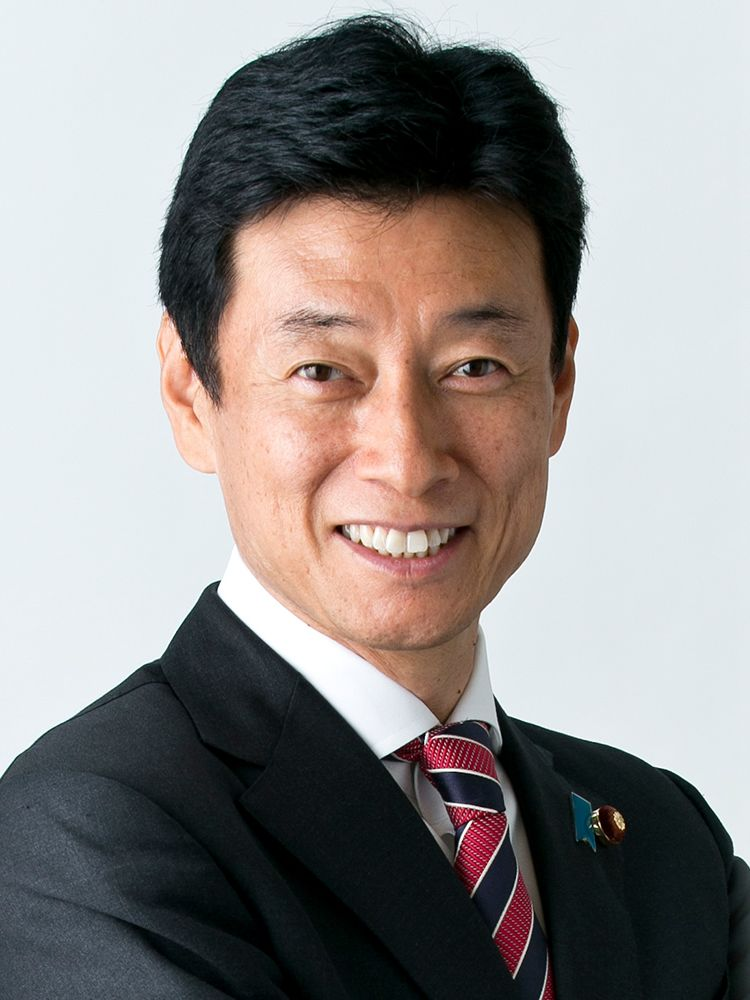
Yasutoshi Nishimura, Minister of Economy, Trade, and Industry

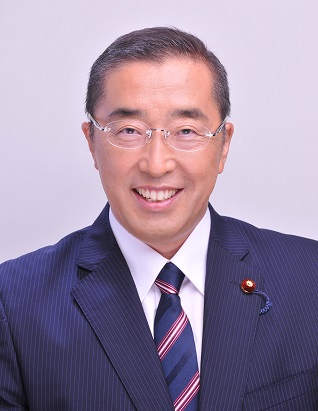
Junji Suzuki, Minister for Internal Affairs and Communications

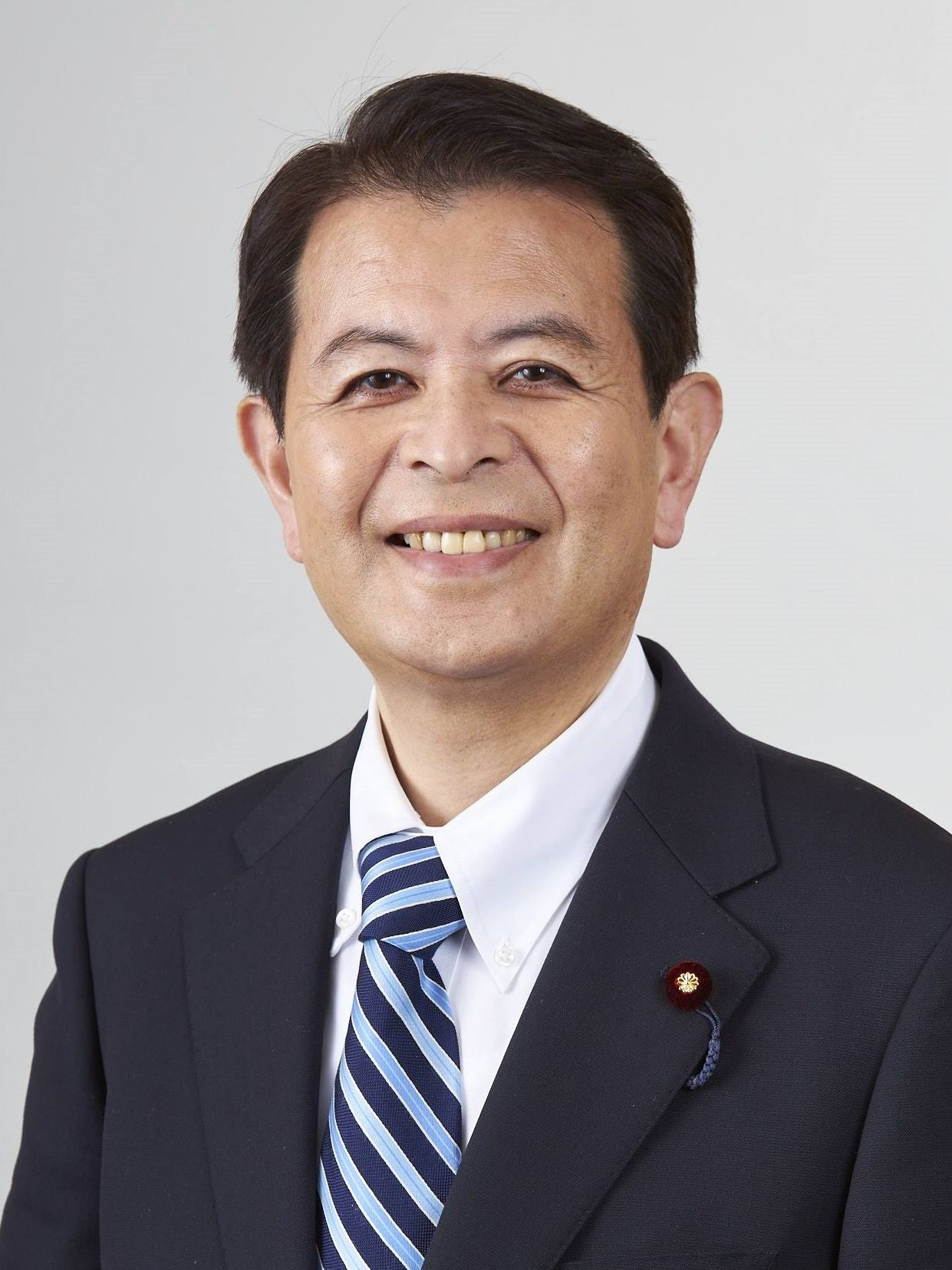
Ichiro Miyashita, Minister of Agriculture

On 8 December 2023, Kishida, as well as other members of the LDP, were questioned by opposition lawmakers during a meeting of the National Diet. According to initial public allegations, dozens of members of the Diet from the Seiwakai were suspected of collecting at least ¥100 million from fundraising and storing the money in slush funds, in violation of Japanese campaign finance and election law. Amidst questioning, Kishida stated that the scandal was being publicly investigated and ordered the LDP to stop fundraising. Hirokazu Matsuno, Chief Cabinet Secretary, was the first individual to be named in the scandal. According to the allegations, he diverted over ¥10 million from fundraising events to a slush fund over a timeline of five years. Matsuno refused to speak about the scandal, noting that it was under investigation by police and stating that the Seiwakai was investigating its accounts.

On 13 December 2023, amidst the growing size of the scandal, Kishida announced the removal of four ministers from his cabinet: Matsuno, Minister of Economy, Trade, and Industry Yasutoshi Nishimura, Minister for Internal Affairs and Communications Junji Suzuki, and Minister of Agriculture Ichiro Miyashita. Deputy Minister of Defence Hiroyuki Miyazawa was also removed from office. All of the removed officials were members of the Seiwakai, while Matsuno's replacement, Yoshimasa Hayashi, was a member of the Kōchikai.

The same day as the removal of the Seiwakai ministers, the opposition Constitutional Democratic Party of Japan filed a motion of no confidence in Kishida's cabinet, which was defeated due to LDP dominance in the Diet's chambers. CDPJ and Japanese Communist Party parliamentarians criticised the government's response to the scandal, with CDPJ leader Kenta Izumi saying that the LDP lacked "self-cleansing ability" and JCP leader Kazuo Shii calling it a "bottomless, serious problem." Miyazawa said following his removal that the Seiwakai faction leadership had told him "it's okay to not enter" kickbacks received between 2020 and 2022, and therefore assumed the practice was legal.

The scandal continued to grow late into the month, as the National Police Agency (NPA) raided the Seiwakai and Shisuikai headquarters. The NPA said that five of six LDP factions, including Kishida's Kōchikai, were under investigation for improper usage of slush funds. Kishida, who was unrelated to the scandal, left the Kōchikai as information regarding their involvement in the scandal became public. He further promised legal reforms and anti-corruption measures, promising to act as a "ball of fire."

On 7 January 2024, the first arrests in the scandal were made, with former deputy Minister of Education Yoshitaka Ikeda and his aide Kazuhiro Kakinuma being charged with covering up ¥48 million received by the Seiwakai between 2018 and 2022. The NPA cited the possibility of destruction of evidence as a reason for their arrest. After information about the arrests became public, Ikeda was expelled from the LDP.

== Aftermath ==
Kishida's approval ratings fell as a result of the scandal, decreasing to 23% as of 13 December 2023, the lowest such rating any Prime Minister has had since the LDP's 2012 return to power. By 22 December, Kishida's approval ratings had further declined to 17%. Per a 18 December 2023 Mainichi Shimbun poll, 79% of individuals polled disapprove of Kishida's performance as Prime Minister, the highest disapproval since the end of World War II. Support for the LDP, according to the poll, remained the highest of any party, with 17% above the CDPJ's 14%.

On 18 January 2024, Kishida announced his intention to dissolve the Kōchikai faction as a result of the scandal. The following day on 19 January, the Shisuikai and Seiwa Seisaku Kenkyūkai factions announced their dissolutions.

Referred to by American journalist Anthony Kuhn as "Japan's worst political corruption scandal in decades," the scandal had threatened the LDP's authority and fueled public speculation that the party might lose power in the 2024 Japanese general election. Japanese diplomat Hitoshi Tanaka speculated that the scandal could lead to a change of government, potentially impacting Japan–United States relations. However, this notion was initially disputed by University of Shizuoka professor Seijiro Takeshita, who pointed out the fragmentation within opposition parties and the lingering unpopularity of the opposition due to the legacy of the 2009–2012 Democratic Party of Japan government. Takeshita had predicted that the scandal would likely deepen political apathy and cynicism among the general public rather than lead to an LDP loss. Political journalist Hiroshi Izumi also claimed, without evidence, that the scandal was part of a broader attempt by Kishida and the Japanese judiciary to seek retribution against the Seiwakai faction following a series of corruption scandals under Abe's premiership that had gone uninvestigated.

However, the predictions of an LDP loss were ultimately realized: public discontent with the scandal contributed to the LDP suffering its second-worst electoral results in history. Along with Komeito, the LDP lost its majority in the House of Representatives in the 2024 general election. Voter turnout was 53.84%, around two percentage points down from the previous election in 2021 and the third lowest in the postwar era.
