= Results of the 1996 Japanese general election =

- 20 October 1996
- All 500 seats in the House of Representatives; 251 seats needed for a majority
Party	Leader	Seats	+/–
LDP	Ryutaro Hashimoto	239	+16
New Frontier	Ichirō Ozawa	160	New
Democratic	Naoto Kan; Yukio Hatoyama	52	New
JCP	Tetsuzo Fuwa	26	+11
Social Democratic	Takako Doi	15	−55
NP-Sakigake	Shōichi Ide	2	−11
Minkairen	Teiko Sasano	1	New
Independents	–	9	−21
This lists parties that won seats. See the complete results below.
- Constituency seats
- All 300 seats
- Turnout: 59.65% (▲7.34pp)
Party	Vote %	Seats
LDP	38.63	169
New Frontier	27.97	96
Democratic	10.62	17
JCP	12.55	2
Social Democratic	2.19	4
NP-Sakigake	1.29	2
Minkairen	0.26	1
Independents	4.44	9
This lists parties that won seats. See the complete results below.
- Proportional seats
- All 200 seats
- Turnout: 59.62%
Party	Vote %	Seats
LDP	32.76	70
New Frontier	28.04	60
Democratic	16.10	35
JCP	13.08	24
Social Democratic	6.38	11
This lists parties that won seats. See the complete results below.
Results by constituency and PR seats, shaded according to vote strength
Prime Minister before	Prime Minister after
Ryutaro Hashimoto; LDP	Ryutaro Hashimoto; LDP

This article presents detailed results of the 1996 Japanese general election. The results are separated into each of the eleven proportional representation blocks and their corresponding prefectures. In the following tables, candidates elected via single-member district are highlighted in green, while candidates elected via proportional representation are highlighted in red.

== Electoral system ==
This was the first election to the House of Representatives condicted using parallel voting. In the 1996 election, 300 members were elected in single-member districts and 200 via party-list proportional representation in eleven multi-member constituencies, referred to as "PR blocks". Single-member districts are apportioned between prefectures and numbered (1st, 2nd, etc). Candidates may run solely in a single-member district, solely in PR, or both (dual listing). Dual listed candidates must win at least 10% of the vote in their single-member district in order to be eligible for election via PR. Dual listed candidates who win their single-member district race are not eligible for election via PR.

Candidates on PR lists may be ranked sequentially or, if they are dual listed, ranked equally with one another. If ranked equally, the best-loser ratio (sekihairitsu) of each candidate determines the order of election. This number is determined by dividing their single-member district votes by those of the winning candidate in that district. In this way, the losing candidates who performed best will be elected first.

If a party wins more PR seats than they have eligible candidates on their list, the unfilled seats will be distributed to other parties in accordance with the PR formula.

== Hokkaido block ==
1996 Japanese general election in Hokkaido
- 20 October 1996

All 22 seats to the House of Representatives
	Majority party	Minority party
Party	LDP	DP
Constituency	6	5
PR seats	3	3
Total	9	8
	Third party	Fourth party
Party	NFP	JCP
Constituency	2	0
PR seats	2	1
Total	4	1

Single-member constituency results in Hokkaido
Constituency	Elected member		Votes	%	Margin	Runner-up		%
Hokkaido 1st	Takahiro Yokomichi	DP	102,577	45.9	46,312	Eiichi Masugi	LDP	25.2
Hokkaido 2nd	Junichi Osanai	NFP	73,697	34.7	10,173	Takamori Yoshikawa	LDP	29.9
Hokkaido 3rd	Gaku Ishizaki	LDP	54,275	26.3	2,796	Satoshi Arai	DP	25.0
Hokkaido 4th	Shizuo Sato	LDP	58,371	30.7	5,039	Koji Suzuki	NFP	28.1
Hokkaido 5th	Nobutaka Machimura	LDP	113,282	49.8	51,436	Kentaro Ono	NFP	27.2
Hokkaido 6th	Hidenori Sasaki	DP	76,572	48.7	29,963	Hiroshi Imazu	LDP	29.7
Hokkaido 7th	Eiko Kaneta	LDP	65,955	34.4	3,406	Yasuki Sakuraba	DP	32.6
Hokkaido 8th	Yoshio Hachiro	DP	110,305	47.5	15,605	Kokou Sato	LDP	40.8
Hokkaido 9th	Yukio Hatoyama	DP	131,936	52.8	63,143	Tatsuo Takahashi	LDP	27.5
Hokkaido 10th	Tadamasa Kodaira	DP	100,489	49.8	27,848	Shōichi Watanabe	LDP	36.0
Hokkaido 11th	Shōichi Nakagawa	LDP	97,428	53.5	30,178	Ryuji Ikemoto	DP	37.0
Hokkaido 12th	Tsutomu Takebe	LDP	92,114	52.0	22,143	Tetsuo Nagai	DP	39.5
Hokkaido 13th	Naoto Kitamura	NFP	83,490	42.8	27,999	Muneo Suzuki	LDP	28.4

Proportional representation results
Party	Votes	Seats	Rank	Elected member	Constituency	Ratio
DP	835,042 (31.8%)	3	1	Seiichi Ikehata		
DP	835,042 (31.8%)	3	2	Kenji Nakazawa		
DP	835,042 (31.8%)	3	3	Seiichi Kaneta		
LDP	740,677 (28.2%)	3	1	Muneo Suzuki	Hokkaido 13th	66.4%
LDP	740,677 (28.2%)	3	2	Takamori Yoshikawa	Hokkaido 2nd	86.2%
LDP	740,677 (28.2%)	3	2	Kokou Sato	Hokkaido 8th	85.8%
NFP	552,847 (21.1%)	2	1	Toshiyuki Wanibuchi		
NFP	552,847 (21.1%)	2	2	Kaori Maruya		
JCP	396,923 (15.1%)	1	1	Kenji Kodama	Hokkaido 3rd	74.8%

== Tohoku block ==
1996 Japanese general election in Tohoku
- 20 October 1996

All 42 seats to the House of Representatives
	Majority party	Minority party	Third party
Party	LDP	NFP	DP
Constituency	16	9	1
PR seats	6	6	2
Total	21	15	3
	Fourth party	Fifth party
Party	JCP	SDP
Constituency	0	0
PR seats	1	1
Total	1	1

Single-member constituency results in Tohoku
Constituency	Elected member		Votes	%	Margin	Runner-up		%
Aomori 1st	Yūji Tsushima	LDP	86,411	43.6	14,412	Ryuichi Kudo	NFP	36.4
Aomori 2nd	Akinori Eto	LDP	63,672	41.9	765	Shingo Mimura	NFP	41.4
Aomori 3rd	Tadamori Ōshima	LDP	96,628	52.5	15,168	Masami Tanabu	NFP	44.2
Aomori 4th	Tarō Kimura	NFP	101,059	52.4	30,469	Kyoichi Tsushima	LDP	36.6
Iwate 1st	Takuya Tasso	NFP	67,420	40.6	17,755	Tokuichiro Tamazawa	LDP	29.9
Iwate 2nd	Shun'ichi Suzuki	LDP	95,913	47.6	12,875	Kentaro Kudo	NFP	41.2
Iwate 3rd	Yohei Sasaki	NFP	103,952	57.5	45,071	Setsu Shiga	LDP	32.6
Iwate 4th	Ichirō Ozawa	NFP	125,619	64.7	87,137	Reijiro Sawafuji	SDP	19.8
Miyagi 1st	Kazuo Aichi	NFP	77,817	40.8	21,280	Tomiko Okazaki	DP	29.7
Miyagi 2nd	Masashi Nakano	LDP	68,137	35.8	5,604	Masashi Nakano	NFP	32.9
Miyagi 3rd	Hiroshi Mitsuzuka	LDP	81,784	53.1	28,634	Kenichi Mukade	NFP	34.5
Miyagi 4th	Soichiro Ito	LDP	75,196	44.7	15,760	Kazuhiro Nitta	NFP	35.3
Miyagi 5th	Jun Azumi	DP	54,550	40.1	4,411	Kimio Doi	NFP	36.8
Miyagi 6th	Fukujiro Kikuchi	LDP	70,765	45.0	651	Masamitsu Oishi	NFP	44.6
Akita 1st	Takao Sato	NFP	95,194	45.5	10,569	Koji Futada	LDP	40.4
Akita 2nd	Hosei Norota	LDP	86,677	54.9	32,546	Kenjiro Hatakeyama	SDP	34.3
Akita 3rd	Kanezo Muraoka	LDP	150,956	57.9	65,566	Hajime Terata	NFP	32.7
Yamagata 1st	Michihiko Kano	NFP	81,047	48.3	20,299	Toshiaki Endo	LDP	36.2
Yamagata 2nd	Takehiko Endo	Ind.	94,211	50.9	19,711	Tetsuo Kondo	LDP	40.3
Yamagata 3rd	Riichiro Chikaoka	LDP	88,389	58.1	33,749	Shosuke Saito	Ind.	35.9
Yamagata 4th	Koichi Kato	LDP	112,033	65.8	73,894	Takayoshi Sagae	NFP	22.4
Fukushima 1st	Tatsuo Sato	LDP	102,950	40.4	9,603	Kentaro Ishihara	Ind.	36.6
Fukushima 2nd	Takumi Nemoto	LDP	100,102	49.3	11,441	Teruhiko Mashiko	NFP	43.6
Fukushima 3rd	Hiroyuki Arai	LDP	91,747	46.2	3,533	Kōichirō Genba	DP	44.4
Fukushima 4th	Kōzō Watanabe	NFP	93,960	48.7	6,317	Fumiaki Saito	LDP	45.5
Fukushima 5th	Goji Sakamoto	NFP	79,027	38.2	337	Naoki Tanaka	LDP	38.1

Proportional representation results
Party	Votes	Seats	Rank	Elected member	Constituency	Ratio
LDP	1,630,777 (35.3%)	6	1	Yoshiyuki Hozumi		
LDP	1,630,777 (35.3%)	6	2	Hidefumi Minorikawa		
LDP	1,630,777 (35.3%)	6	3	Ichio Kumagai		
LDP	1,630,777 (35.3%)	6	4	Koji Futada	Akita 1st	88.8%
LDP	1,630,777 (35.3%)	6	4	Toshiaki Endo	Yamagata 1st	74.9%
LDP	1,630,777 (35.3%)	6	4	Tokuichiro Tamazawa	Iwate 1st	73.6%
NFP	1,532,987 (33.2%)	6	1	Kodo Kohata		
NFP	1,532,987 (33.2%)	6	2	Yoshihisa Inoue		
NFP	1,532,987 (33.2%)	6	3	Tatsuo Sasayama		
NFP	1,532,987 (33.2%)	6	4	Yasusuke Konta		
NFP	1,532,987 (33.2%)	6	5	Koki Hagino		
NFP	1,532,987 (33.2%)	6	6	Kijuro Sugahara		
DP	513,410 (11.1%)	2	1	Ichiro Hino		
DP	513,410 (11.1%)	2	2	Kōichirō Genba	Fukushima 3rd	96.1%
JCP	442,790 (9.6%)	1	1	Zenmei Matsumoto		
SDP	382,271 (8.3%)	1	1	Kenjiro Hatakeyama	Akita 2nd	62.4%

== Northern Kanto block ==
1996 Japanese general election in Northern Kanto
- 20 October 1996

All 52 seats to the House of Representatives
	Majority party	Minority party	Third party
Party	LDP	NFP	DP
Constituency	20	8	0
PR seats	8	6	4
Total	28	14	4
	Fourth party	Fifth party	Sixth party
Party	JCP	SDP	Ind.
Constituency	0	0	3
PR seats	2	1	–
Total	2	1	3

Single-member constituency results in Northern Kanto
Constituency	Elected member		Votes	%	Margin	Runner-up		%
Ibaraki 1st	Norihiko Akagi	LDP	114,796	52.7	51,727	Enju Tsukada	NFP	29.0
Ibaraki 2nd	Fukushiro Nukaga	LDP	109,139	61.9	55,001	Yoshiharu Tokoi	NFP	30.7
Ibaraki 3rd	Toshio Nakayama	LDP	89,822	50.0	30,742	Yoji Nagaoka	NFP	32.9
Ibaraki 4th	Seiroku Kajiyama	LDP	112,977	68.3	74,949	Zenichiro Saito	NFP	23.0
Ibaraki 5th	Shunpei Tsukahara	LDP	69,369	51.2	15,872	Akihiro Ohata	DP	39.8
Ibaraki 6th	Yuya Niwa	LDP	110,495	57.0	71,123	Kunio Kobayashi	NFP	20.3
Ibaraki 7th	Kishirō Nakamura	Ind.	100,175	53.6	27,967	Katsuya Tanaka	NFP	38.7
Tochigi 1st	Hajime Funada	Ind.	127,503	63.4	70,263	Susumu Yanase	DP	28.4
Tochigi 2nd	Koya Nishikawa	LDP	73,393	52.6	17,954	Mamoru Kobayashi	DP	39.7
Tochigi 3rd	Yoshimi Watanabe	LDP	90,082	83.5	72,092	Shozo Maki	JCP	16.5
Tochigi 4th	Tsutomu Sato	LDP	117,851	53.3	34,468	Kenji Yamaoka	NFP	37.7
Tochigi 5th	Toshimitsu Motegi	LDP	77,659	47.5	7,592	Hatsuhiro Shindo	NFP	42.8
Gunma 1st	Kōji Omi	LDP	110,103	49.9	52,078	Tsugio Kumakawa	NFP	26.3
Gunma 2nd	Takashi Sasagawa	NFP	81,026	47.1	21,796	Osamu Morita	LDP	34.4
Gunma 3rd	Yoshio Yatsu	LDP	85,562	51.5	44,110	Hiroyoshi Sasagawa	NFP	24.9
Gunma 4th	Yasuo Fukuda	LDP	73,674	46.0	28,540	Minoru Komai	NFP	28.2
Gunma 5th	Keizō Obuchi	LDP	127,052	70.7	93,834	Miyuki Shibayama	DP	18.5
Saitama 1st	Hikaru Matsunaga	LDP	85,109	39.0	5,179	Takujiro Hamada	NFP	36.6
Saitama 2nd	Katsuyuki Ishida	NFP	76,252	36.6	610	Yoshitaka Shindō	LDP	36.3
Saitama 3rd	Hiroshi Imai	NFP	63,841	31.4	9,138	Takuji Noguchi	LDP	26.9
Saitama 4th	Kiyoshi Ueda	NFP	72,420	39.3	25,551	Chuko Hayakawa	LDP	25.4
Saitama 5th	Nobuhiko Fukunaga	LDP	63,120	30.9	9,088	Zenjiro Kaneko	NFP	26.4
Saitama 6th	Kaneshige Wakamatsu	NFP	71,944	36.9	8,439	Shigeru Chatani	LDP	32.6
Saitama 7th	Kiyoshi Nakano	NFP	74,905	39.0	30,138	Toru Komiyama	LDP	23.3
Saitama 8th	Masayoshi Namiki	NFP	50,712	31.2	2,928	Masanori Arai	LDP	29.4
Saitama 9th	Matsushige Ono	LDP	77,998	37.8	31,527	Fumihiko Igarashi	DP	22.5
Saitama 10th	Taimei Yamaguchi	LDP	74,839	46.4	31,195	Tetsuhisa Matsuzaki	DP	27.0
Saitama 11th	Takuji Kato	LDP	78,705	39.1	26,930	Taneaki Tanami	Ind.	25.7
Saitama 12th	Toshio Masuda	NFP	76,105	40.4	3,278	Toshio Kojima	LDP	38.6
Saitama 13th	Shinako Tsuchiya	Ind.	112,112	58.6	61,817	Makoto Setoi	JCP	26.3
Saitama 14th	Mitsubayashi Yataro	LDP	77,260	39.9	1,139	Eisuke Yamada	NFP	39.3

Proportional representation results
Party	Votes	Seats	Rank	Elected member	Constituency	Ratio
LDP	1,962,854 (34.9%)	8	1	Yasuhiro Nakasone		
LDP	1,962,854 (34.9%)	8	2	Nobuyuki Hanashi		
LDP	1,962,854 (34.9%)	8	3	Mayumi Moriyama		
LDP	1,962,854 (34.9%)	8	4	Genichiro Sata		
LDP	1,962,854 (34.9%)	8	5	Yojiro Nakajima		
LDP	1,962,854 (34.9%)	8	19	Susumu Hasumi		
LDP	1,962,854 (34.9%)	8	20	Shigeo Uetake		
LDP	1,962,854 (34.9%)	8	21	Yoshitaka Shindō	Saitama 2nd	99.2%
NFP	1,500,349 (26.7%)	6	1	Atsushi Kanda		
NFP	1,500,349 (26.7%)	6	2	Shosuke Miyachi		
NFP	1,500,349 (26.7%)	6	3	Fumi Aoyama		
NFP	1,500,349 (26.7%)	6	4	Taizo Fukutome		
NFP	1,500,349 (26.7%)	6	5	Nobuaki Futami		
NFP	1,500,349 (26.7%)	6	6	Yuriko Takeyama		
DP	965,328 (17.2%)	4	1	Yukio Edano	Saitama 5th	81.4%
DP	965,328 (17.2%)	4	1	Akihiro Ohata	Ibaraki 5th	77.1%
DP	965,328 (17.2%)	4	1	Mamoru Kobayashi	Tochigi 2nd	75.5%
DP	965,328 (17.2%)	4	1	Ritsuo Hosokawa	Saitama 3rd	71.1%
JCP	722,792 (12.8%)	2	1	Mitsuhiro Kaneko		
JCP	722,792 (12.8%)	2	2	Tsuneo Yajima	Saitama 7th	53.7%
SDP	282,201 (5.0%)	1	1	Hajime Fukada	Saitama 6th	24.8%

== Southern Kanto block ==
1996 Japanese general election in Southern Kanto
- 20 October 1996

All 55 seats to the House of Representatives
	Majority party	Minority party	Third party
Party	LDP	NFP	DP
Constituency	21	9	2
PR seats	7	7	5
Total	28	16	7
	Fourth party	Fifth party
Party	JCP	SDP
Constituency	0	0
PR seats	3	1
Total	3	1

Single-member constituency results in Southern Kanto
Constituency	Elected member		Votes	%	Margin	Runner-up		%
Chiba 1st	Hideo Usui	LDP	77,679	42.7	37,585	Minoru Murai	NFP	22.0
Chiba 2nd	Kazuo Eguchi	LDP	75,939	37.1	15,538	Kazuhira Nakamura	NFP	29.5
Chiba 3rd	Masayuki Okajima	NFP	84,846	39.9	11,592	Hirokazu Matsuno	LDP	34.4
Chiba 4th	Shōichi Tanaka	LDP	73,792	32.0	105	Yoshihiko Noda	NFP	31.9
Chiba 5th	Kou Tanaka	DP	67,032	32.2	4,081	Masaru Kanou	LDP	30.3
Chiba 6th	Hiromichi Watanabe	LDP	60,801	39.2	5,529	Yukio Ubukata	DP	35.7
Chiba 7th	Kazuna Matsumoto	LDP	71,306	36.4	17,822	Etsuro Miyamoto	NFP	27.3
Chiba 8th	Yoshitaka Sakurada	LDP	69,539	34.0	6,799	Hiroyuki Nagahama	NFP	30.7
Chiba 9th	Yukio Jitsukawa	NFP	79,539	36.3	3,872	Kenichi Mizuno	LDP	34.5
Chiba 10th	Motoo Hayashi	LDP	114,010	63.9	69,602	Hiroshi Sudo	NFP	24.9
Chiba 11th	Eisuke Mori	LDP	116,195	61.6	70,301	Koichi Hatsutani	NFP	24.3
Chiba 12th	Yasukazu Hamada	LDP	102,570	54.0	41,487	Kei Morita	DP	32.2
Kanagawa 1st	Jun Matsumoto	LDP	55,360	26.4	866	Kenichiro Sato	DP	26.0
Kanagawa 2nd	Yoshihide Suga	LDP	70,459	32.2	4,554	Akihiro Ueda	NFP	30.2
Kanagawa 3rd	Tomoo Nishikawa	NFP	60,360	31.3	3,660	Hachiro Okonogi	LDP	29.4
Kanagawa 4th	Tadayoshi Iijima	LDP	46,389	25.1	7,664	Keiichiro Asao	NFP	21.0
Kanagawa 5th	Keishu Tanaka	NFP	81,289	35.9	22,557	Issei Suzuki	LDP	25.9
Kanagawa 6th	Motohisa Ikeda	DP	60,290	31.0	5,108	Ryushi Tsuchida	NFP	28.4
Kanagawa 7th	Tsuneo Suzuki	LDP	75,599	33.8	21,324	Terumichi Suzuki	NFP	24.3
Kanagawa 8th	Hiroshi Nakada	NFP	66,313	35.9	26,451	Masafumi Matsuzaki	LDP	21.6
Kanagawa 9th	Shigefumi Matsuzawa	NFP	72,147	35.1	21,724	Eiichi Ogawa	LDP	24.5
Kanagawa 10th	Eiji Nagai	NFP	70,276	31.2	1,384	Kazunori Tanaka	LDP	30.6
Kanagawa 11th	Junichiro Koizumi	LDP	118,955	58.2	65,432	Tadatsugu Miyachi	NFP	26.2
Kanagawa 12th	Ikuzo Sakurai	LDP	51,360	30.7	849	Yoichiro Esaki	NFP	30.1
Kanagawa 13th	Atsuhiro Tomizawa	NFP	73,773	34.0	1,751	Akira Amari	LDP	33.2
Kanagawa 14th	Hirohisa Fujii	NFP	83,010	36.9	30,443	Taei Nakamoto	LDP	23.4
Kanagawa 15th	Taro Kono	LDP	84,723	36.4	13,297	Toichiro Ikeda	NFP	30.7
Kanagawa 16th	Yoshiyuki Kamei	LDP	88,325	51.1	52,030	Hidemi Terachi	NFP	21.0
Kanagawa 17th	Yōhei Kōno	LDP	105,282	44.7	46,277	Junichi Tsuyuki	Ind.	25.1
Yamanashi 1st	Eiichi Nakao	LDP	52,111	38.9	6,823	Azuma Koshiishi	DP	33.8
Yamanashi 2nd	Mitsuo Horiuchi	LDP	90,567	65.7	58,742	Kobun Sugimoto	NFP	23.1
Yamanashi 3rd	Shōmei Yokouchi	LDP	87,683	69.2	55,946	Hitomi Nagatani	JCP	25.1

Proportional representation results
Party	Votes	Seats	Rank	Elected member	Constituency	Ratio
LDP	1,820,846 (29.0%)	7	1	Kazuya Ishibashi		
LDP	1,820,846 (29.0%)	7	2	Shozaburo Nakamura		
LDP	1,820,846 (29.0%)	7	3	Sadao Ioku		
LDP	1,820,846 (29.0%)	7	4	Akira Amari	Kanagawa 13th	97.6%
LDP	1,820,846 (29.0%)	7	4	Hachiro Okonogi	Kanagawa 3rd	93.9%
LDP	1,820,846 (29.0%)	7	8	Kunio Tanabe		
LDP	1,820,846 (29.0%)	7	9	Kazunori Tanaka	Kanagawa 10th	98.0%
NFP	1,667,552 (26.6%)	7	1	Hitoshi Yonetsu		
NFP	1,667,552 (26.6%)	7	2	Yuichi Ichikawa		
NFP	1,667,552 (26.6%)	7	3	Nobuo Kawakami		
NFP	1,667,552 (26.6%)	7	4	Isamu Ueda		
NFP	1,667,552 (26.6%)	7	5	Shigeyuki Tomita		
NFP	1,667,552 (26.6%)	7	6	Kenzo Yoneda		
NFP	1,667,552 (26.6%)	7	7	Kimiaki Matsuzaki		
DP	1,331,850 (21.2%)	5	1	Shun Hayama		
DP	1,331,850 (21.2%)	5	2	Sakihito Ozawa		
DP	1,331,850 (21.2%)	5	3	Tetsuo Kitamura		
DP	1,331,850 (21.2%)	5	4	Kenichiro Sato	Kanagawa 1st	98.4%
DP	1,331,850 (21.2%)	5	4	Yukio Ubukata	Chiba 6th	90.9%
JCP	881,751 (14.0%)	3	1	Kazuo Shii		
JCP	881,751 (14.0%)	3	2	Masahiro Nakaji	Kanagawa 10th	68.9%
JCP	881,751 (14.0%)	3	3	Takeshi Omori	Kanagawa 5th	45.8%
SDP	403,875 (6.4%)	1	1	Shigeru Itō	Kanagawa 8th	34.3%

== Tokyo block ==
1996 Japanese general election in Tokyo
- 20 October 1996

All 44 seats to the House of Representatives
	Majority party	Minority party	Third party
Party	LDP	NFP	DP
Constituency	14	6	4
PR seats	5	5	5
Total	19	11	9
	Fourth party	Fifth party
Party	JCP	SDP
Constituency	0	0
PR seats	3	1
Total	3	1

Single-member constituency results in Tokyo
Constituency	Elected member		Votes	%	Margin	Runner-up		%
Tokyo 1st	Kaoru Yosano	LDP	82,098	39.2	18,437	Banri Kaieda	DP	30.4
Tokyo 2nd	Kunio Hatoyama	DP	88,183	44.7	19,680	Takashi Fukaya	LDP	34.7
Tokyo 3rd	Shinichiro Kurimoto	LDP	73,055	32.2	5,402	Jin Matsubara	NFP	29.8
Tokyo 4th	Shokei Arai	Ind.	78,805	38.2	31,965	Keigo Ōuchi	LDP	22.7
Tokyo 5th	Takashi Kosugi	LDP	84,731	37.9	33,313	Yoshio Tezuka	DP	23.0
Tokyo 6th	Tetsundo Iwakuni	NFP	82,106	34.5	19,588	Michio Ochi	LDP	26.2
Tokyo 7th	Shigeru Kasuya	LDP	65,332	30.2	8,112	Tatsu Miki	DP	26.4
Tokyo 8th	Nobuteru Ishihara	LDP	74,856	32.7	7,186	Hiroshi Yamada	NFP	29.5
Tokyo 9th	Koichi Yoshida	NFP	67,657	30.7	7,989	Toshio Ogawa	DP	27.1
Tokyo 10th	Kōki Kobayashi	LDP	52,787	30.7	7,251	Muneaki Samejima	NFP	26.4
Tokyo 11th	Hakubun Shimomura	LDP	68,321	30.1	7,100	Kazuhiro Furuyama	NFP	27.0
Tokyo 12th	Eita Yashiro	LDP	61,461	28.4	1,172	Tamaki Sawa	NFP	27.9
Tokyo 13th	Ichirō Kamoshita	NFP	70,697	35.0	5,506	Nobuyoshi Kondo	LDP	32.3
Tokyo 14th	Taiichirō Nishikawa	NFP	60,995	34.6	2,414	Midori Matsushima	LDP	33.2
Tokyo 15th	Koji Kakizawa	LDP	61,701	36.4	14,732	Akira Kuroyanagi	NFP	27.7
Tokyo 16th	Yoshinobu Shimamura	LDP	77,753	39.0	12,811	Naoko Sato	NFP	32.6
Tokyo 17th	Katsuei Hirasawa	LDP	73,726	34.0	9,994	Natsuo Yamaguchi	NFP	29.4
Tokyo 18th	Naoto Kan	DP	116,910	62.4	92,665	Takashi Kanamori	NFP	13.0
Tokyo 19th	Yoshinori Suematsu	DP	76,599	32.5	21,958	Koichiro Watanabe	NFP	23.2
Tokyo 20th	Yuriko Ohno	NFP	55,559	27.0	977	Seiichiro Shimizu	LDP	26.5
Tokyo 21st	Joji Yamamoto	DP	55,458	28.9	6,150	Kiyoshi Ozawa	LDP	25.7
Tokyo 22nd	Tatsuya Ito	NFP	69,707	29.6	5,733	Sadao Yamahana	DP	27.1
Tokyo 23rd	Kosuke Ito	LDP	85,035	38.4	38,214	Makio Kitasato	NFP	21.1
Tokyo 24th	Tamon Kobayashi	LDP	75,061	34.0	10,331	Yōsuke Takagi	NFP	29.3
Tokyo 25th	Yozo Ishikawa	LDP	72,180	41.0	10,152	Takashi Usui	NFP	35.2

Proportional representation results
Party	Votes	Seats	Rank	Elected member	Constituency	Ratio
LDP	1,398,791 (27.0%)	5	1	Takashi Fukaya	Tokyo 2nd	77.6%
LDP	1,398,791 (27.0%)	5	2	Hyosuke Kujiraoka		
LDP	1,398,791 (27.0%)	5	3	Ichiro Takahashi		
LDP	1,398,791 (27.0%)	5	4	Kiyoshi Ozawa	Tokyo 21st	88.9%
LDP	1,398,791 (27.0%)	5	5	Michio Ochi	Tokyo 6th	76.1%
NFP	1,275,432 (24.6%)	5	1	Koriki Jojima		
NFP	1,275,432 (24.6%)	5	2	Shozo Azuma		
NFP	1,275,432 (24.6%)	5	3	Otohiko Endō		
NFP	1,275,432 (24.6%)	5	4	Akihiro Ota		
NFP	1,275,432 (24.6%)	5	5	Keiichi Ishii		
DP	1,213,677 (23.4%)	5	2	Eiko Ishige		
DP	1,213,677 (23.4%)	5	3	Sadao Yamahana	Tokyo 22nd	91.7%
DP	1,213,677 (23.4%)	5	3	Banri Kaieda	Tokyo 1st	77.5%
DP	1,213,677 (23.4%)	5	6	Yukihisa Fujita		
DP	1,213,677 (23.4%)	5	7	Kōki Ishii	Tokyo 6th	63.3%
JCP	923,764 (17.8%)	3	1	Tetsuzo Fuwa		
JCP	923,764 (17.8%)	3	2	Rikukai Sasaki		
JCP	923,764 (17.8%)	3	3	Taketoshi Nakajima	Tokyo 11th	79.8%
SDP	280,391 (5.4%)	1	1	Nobuto Hosaka	Tokyo 22nd	19.9%

== Hokuriku-Shin'etsu block ==
1996 Japanese general election in Hokuriku-Shin'etsu
- 20 October 1996

All 33 seats to the House of Representatives
	Majority party	Minority party	Third party
Party	LDP	NFP	DP
Constituency	14	5	1
PR seats	5	4	2
Total	19	9	3
	Fourth party	Fifth party
Party	JCP	SDP
Constituency	0	0
PR seats	1	1
Total	1	1

Single-member constituency results in Hokuriku-Shin'etsu
Constituency	Elected member		Votes	%	Margin	Runner-up		%
Niigata 1st	Rokuzaemon Yoshida	LDP	87,887	42.7	6,850	Nobuyuki Sekiyama	Ind.	39.3
Niigata 2nd	Shin Sakurai	LDP	94,203	40.8	5,159	Motohiko Kondo	Ind.	38.5
Niigata 3rd	Yamato Inaba	LDP	79,635	36.0	13,568	Uichiro Iwamura	Ind.	29.9
Niigata 4th	Hirohisa Kurihara	LDP	85,743	41.6	22,920	Hideo Watanabe	Ind.	30.5
Niigata 5th	Makiko Tanaka	LDP	96,759	48.9	12,235	Yukio Hoshino	NFP	38.1
Niigata 6th	Osamu Takatori	LDP	107,578	48.3	4,271	Nobutaka Tsutsui	Ind.	46.4
Toyama 1st	Jinen Nagase	LDP	55,580	35.5	8,065	Tadashi Hirono	NFP	30.3
Toyama 2nd	Hiroshi Sumi	LDP	126,734	84.8	103,989	Makoto Orita	JCP	15.2
Toyama 3rd	Tamisuke Watanuki	LDP	182,185	79.9	150,709	Hiroshi Ueda	JCP	13.8
Ishikawa 1st	Keiwa Okuda	NFP	87,329	49.4	16,175	Yutaka Kuwabara	DP	40.2
Ishikawa 2nd	Yoshirō Mori	LDP	105,586	51.7	25,052	Yasuo Ichikawa	NFP	39.4
Ishikawa 3rd	Riki Kawara	LDP	92,820	45.5	2,022	Tomiro Yata	Ind.	44.5
Fukui 1st	Ryuzo Sasaki	NFP	48,214	34.0	7,374	Isao Matsumiya	Ind.	28.8
Fukui 2nd	Takamori Makino	LDP	79,222	52.4	14,198	Taku Yamamoto	NFP	43.0
Fukui 3rd	Kazuhiko Tsuji	DP	52,473	36.8	3,711	Tsuyoshi Takagi	LDP	34.2
Nagano 1st	Kenji Kosaka	NFP	118,386	41.8	39,985	Shusei Tanaka	NPS	27.7
Nagano 2nd	Jin Murai	NFP	122,483	51.9	62,084	Yunai Mochizuki	LDP	25.6
Nagano 3rd	Tsutomu Hata	NFP	161,670	62.6	90,710	Shoichi Ide	NPS	27.5
Nagano 4th	Hajime Ogawa	LDP	72,810	43.3	7,801	Shigeyuki Goto	NFP	43.3
Nagano 5th	Sohei Miyashita	LDP	106,449	47.9	11,953	Mamoru Nakajima	NFP	42.5

Proportional representation results
Party	Votes	Seats	Rank	Elected member	Constituency	Ratio
LDP	1,407,828 (36.1%)	5	1	Katsuhiko Shirakawa		
LDP	1,407,828 (36.1%)	5	2	Kyogon Hagiyama		
LDP	1,407,828 (36.1%)	5	3	Kotaro Tachibana		
LDP	1,407,828 (36.1%)	5	4	Tatsuo Murayama		
LDP	1,407,828 (36.1%)	5	5	Misoji Sakamoto		
NFP	1,180,904 (30.3%)	4	1	Tatsuo Ozawa		
NFP	1,180,904 (30.3%)	4	2	Ikuo Horigome		
NFP	1,180,904 (30.3%)	4	3	Yoshio Urushibara		
NFP	1,180,904 (30.3%)	4	4	Yasuo Ichikawa	Ishikawa 2nd	76.2%
DP	494,666 (12.7%)	2	1	Yutaka Kuwabara	Ishikawa 1st	81.4%
DP	494,666 (12.7%)	2	1	Tomio Sakagami	Niigata 4th	49.1%
JCP	387,664 (9.9%)	1	1	Hideo Kijima	Nagano 4th	41.6%
SDP	243,287 (6.2%)	1	1	Seiko Kitazawa	Nagano 2nd	22.8%

== Tokai block ==
1996 Japanese general election in Tokai
- 20 October 1996

All 57 seats to the House of Representatives
	Majority party	Minority party	Third party
Party	NFP	LDP	DP
Constituency	16	15	2
PR seats	8	8	3
Total	24	23	5
	Fourth party	Fifth party
Party	JCP	SDP
Constituency	0	0
PR seats	3	1
Total	3	1

Single-member constituency results in Tokai
Constituency	Elected member		Votes	%	Margin	Runner-up		%
Gifu 1st	Seiko Noda	LDP	70,799	37.1	3,907	Iwao Matsuda	NFP	35.1
Gifu 2nd	Yasufumi Tanahashi	LDP	94,796	51.7	24,988	Shojiro Kojima	NFP	38.1
Gifu 3rd	Kabun Mutō	LDP	117,933	53.1	42,895	Tetsuo Yoshioka	NFP	33.8
Gifu 4th	Takao Fujii	LDP	131,976	58.1	64,894	Kazunobu Takai	NFP	29.5
Gifu 5th	Keiji Furuya	LDP	79,133	42.4	28,637	Michihiro Ando	NFP	27.1
Shizuoka 1st	Yoshinori Oguchi	NFP	48,650	21.5	11,589	Shinya Totsuka	LDP	16.4
Shizuoka 2nd	Shozo Harada	LDP	127,933	61.2	91,219	Hirokichi Asaba	JCP	17.6
Shizuoka 3rd	Hakuo Yanagisawa	LDP	116,610	55.3	46,195	Nobuko Iwaki	NFP	33.4
Shizuoka 4th	Yoshio Mochizuki	Ind.	68,770	53.3	28,144	Masatoshi Kurata	LDP	31.5
Shizuoka 5th	Toshitsugu Saito	LDP	76,492	52.5	43,947	Hideyuki Maejima	SDP	22.3
Shizuoka 6th	Shu Watanabe	DP	60,609	31.6	4,769	Mitsuo Sakurada	Ind.	29.1
Shizuoka 7th	Yoshiaki Kibe	LDP	90,317	42.9	11,962	Masaomi Koike	Ind.	37.2
Shizuoka 8th	Yasuyuki Kitawaki	NFP	98,032	49.5	22,475	Ryū Shionoya	LDP	38.2
Shizuoka 9th	Hiroshi Kumagai	NFP	99,151	52.1	29,088	Shinichi Suzui	LDP	36.8
Aichi 1st	Takashi Kawamura	NFP	66,876	40.0	23,907	Norio Imaeda	LDP	25.7
Aichi 2nd	Hiroyuki Aoki	NFP	56,101	32.9	11,163	Hiro Tanabe	LDP	26.4
Aichi 3rd	Yukihiro Yoshida	NFP	52,478	32.3	8,594	Takeshi Kataoka	LDP	27.0
Aichi 4th	Jun Misawa	NFP	57,361	35.7	9,152	Saburo Tsukamoto	LDP	30.0
Aichi 5th	Hirotaka Akamatsu	DP	48,648	30.9	2,163	Takahide Kimura	LDP	29.5
Aichi 6th	Shozo Kusakawa	NFP	90,812	39.7	31,181	Katsundo Ito	LDP	26.1
Aichi 7th	Takashi Aoyama	NFP	91,439	47.5	41,712	Taichi Niwa	LDP	25.9
Aichi 8th	Toichiro Kuno	LDP	93,053	44.4	2,954	Yusuke Morita	NFP	43.0
Aichi 9th	Toshiki Kaifu	NFP	111,578	47.7	53,519	Hiroshi Yoshikawa	LDP	24.8
Aichi 10th	Tetsuma Esaki	NFP	110,820	46.4	38,642	Haruo Mori	LDP	30.2
Aichi 11th	Eisei Ito	NFP	123,404	55.5	37,638	Yasuoki Urano	LDP	38.6
Aichi 12th	Seiken Sugiura	LDP	133,257	55.2	53,307	Minoru Kawashima	NFP	33.1
Aichi 13th	Satoshi Shima	NFP	87,991	46.8	7,362	Hideaki Ōmura	LDP	42.9
Aichi 14th	Katsuhito Asano	LDP	72,661	49.8	28,240	Kazuo Yoshitomi	NFP	30.5
Aichi 15th	Keijiro Murata	LDP	74,963	45.3	10,477	Yoshitake Kimata	NFP	39.0
Mie 1st	Hiroshi Nakai	NFP	89,802	45.2	443	Jirō Kawasaki	LDP	45.0
Mie 2nd	Masaharu Nakagawa	NFP	89,620	55.4	34,104	Chuji Ito	DP	34.3
Mie 3rd	Katsuya Okada	NFP	108,690	57.9	50,183	Kazuya Kaneko	LDP	31.1
Mie 4th	Norihisa Tamura	LDP	78,383	47.8	2,588	Akihiko Noro	NFP	46.2
Mie 5th	Takao Fujinami	LDP	115,959	72.8	72,615	Kiyoharu Kuroki	JCP	27.2

Proportional representation results
Party	Votes	Seats	Rank	Elected member	Constituency	Ratio
NFP	2,107,536 (33.0%)	8	1	Akiko Yamanaka		
NFP	2,107,536 (33.0%)	8	2	Yoshio Suzuki		
NFP	2,107,536 (33.0%)	8	3	Kōshirō Ishida		
NFP	2,107,536 (33.0%)	8	4	Chikara Sakaguchi		
NFP	2,107,536 (33.0%)	8	5	Motoo Abe		
NFP	2,107,536 (33.0%)	8	6	Yoneo Hirata		
NFP	2,107,536 (33.0%)	8	7	Masatomo Kawai		
NFP	2,107,536 (33.0%)	8	8	Soya Fukuoka		
LDP	2,042,948 (32.0%)	8	1	Kazuyoshi Kaneko		
LDP	2,042,948 (32.0%)	8	2	Jitsuo Inagaki		
LDP	2,042,948 (32.0%)	8	3	Norio Sugiyama		
LDP	2,042,948 (32.0%)	8	4	Hidemasa Oishi		
LDP	2,042,948 (32.0%)	8	5	Jirō Kawasaki	Mie 1st	99.5%
LDP	2,042,948 (32.0%)	8	5	Takahide Kimura	Aichi 5th	95.5%
LDP	2,042,948 (32.0%)	8	5	Hideaki Ōmura	Aichi 13th	91.6%
LDP	2,042,948 (32.0%)	8	5	Hiroyasu Kurihara	Shizuoka 6th	91.3%
DP	955,464 (15.0%)	3	1	Motohisa Furukawa	Aichi 2nd	78.0%
DP	955,464 (15.0%)	3	1	Shoichi Kondo	Aichi 3rd	73.0%
DP	955,464 (15.0%)	3	1	Chuji Ito	Mie 2nd	61.9%
JCP	756,037 (11.9%)	3	1	Kensho Sasaki		
JCP	756,037 (11.9%)	3	2	Yukiko Seko	Aichi 4th	54.0%
JCP	756,037 (11.9%)	3	3	Takashige Hiraga	Shizuoka 8th	24.8%
SDP	378,414 (5.9%)	1	1	Hideyuki Maejima	Shizuoka 5th	42.5%

== Kinki block ==
1996 Japanese general election in Kinki
- 20 October 1996

All 80 seats to the House of Representatives
	Majority party	Minority party	Third party
Party	NFP	LDP	JCP
Constituency	28	13	1
PR seats	10	10	6
Total	38	23	7
	Fourth party	Fifth party	Sixth party
Party	DP	SDP	NPS
Constituency	0	1	1
PR seats	5	2	0
Total	5	3	1
	Seventh party	Eighth party
Party	DRP	Ind.
Constituency	1	2
PR seats	–	–
Total	1	2

Single-member constituency results in Kinki
Constituency	Elected member		Votes	%	Margin	Runner-up		%
Shiga 1st	Tatsuo Kawabata	NFP	55,967	34.7	2,491	Makoto Mekata	LDP	33.2
Shiga 2nd	Masayoshi Takemura	NPS	107,053	43.0	27,917	Akira Konishi	LDP	31.8
Shiga 3rd	Mineichi Iwanaga	Ind.	70,997	38.4	25,583	Yoshitaka Kasahara	NPS	24.5
Kyoto 1st	Bunmei Ibuki	LDP	63,094	31.3	2,653	Keiji Kokuta	JCP	30.0
Kyoto 2nd	Mikio Okuda	LDP	43,060	29.2	849	Satoshi Inoue	JCP	28.7
Kyoto 3rd	Iwao Teramae	JCP	58,479	34.7	1,238	Shigehiko Okuyama	LDP	33.9
Kyoto 4th	Hiromu Nonaka	LDP	100,703	48.8	39,785	Shiro Kamine	JCP	29.5
Kyoto 5th	Sadakazu Tanigaki	LDP	91,146	56.8	54,457	Takashi Mikami	NFP	22.9
Kyoto 6th	Kazuya Tamaki	NFP	73,583	32.3	18,678	Kazunori Yamanoi	DP	24.1
Osaka 1st	Kōki Chūma	LDP	73,443	41.9	11,020	Masafumi Ikenobo	NFP	35.6
Osaka 2nd	Megumu Sato	NFP	92,292	49.8	34,183	Ikuko Ishii	JCP	31.4
Osaka 3rd	Masahiro Tabata	NFP	76,938	35.7	5,926	Takuji Yanagimoto	LDP	32.9
Osaka 4th	Tadashi Maeda	NFP	76,297	39.0	10,170	Masaaki Nakayama	LDP	33.8
Osaka 5th	Takayoshi Taniguchi	NFP	74,925	36.3	19,079	Mitsuo Higashinaka	JCP	27.1
Osaka 6th	Yutaka Fukushima	NFP	85,173	41.5	36,188	Keiichiro Konishi	LDP	23.9
Osaka 7th	Osamu Fujimura	NFP	53,968	31.7	13,396	Shiro Arisawa	LDP	23.8
Osaka 8th	Kansei Nakano	NFP	74,723	44.2	40,160	Issei Inoue	DP	20.4
Osaka 9th	Takeshi Nishida	NFP	72,267	33.4	12,450	Ken Harada	LDP	27.7
Osaka 10th	Kazuo Ishigaki	NFP	53,623	31.4	7,968	Shonosuke Hayashi	LDP	26.7
Osaka 11th	Hirofumi Hirano	Ind.	97,294	48.6	32,759	Masumi Ogawa	LDP	32.2
Osaka 12th	Shinji Tarutoko	NFP	81,284	45.5	23,686	Ishimatsu Kitakawa	LDP	32.3
Osaka 13th	Akira Nishino	NFP	90,784	41.3	7,530	Masajuro Shiokawa	LDP	37.9
Osaka 14th	Eiichi Nakamura	NFP	85,033	38.1	5,686	Takashi Tanihata	LDP	35.5
Osaka 15th	Naokazu Takemoto	LDP	81,602	39.6	3,726	Shuji Kitagawa	NFP	37.8
Osaka 16th	Kazuo Kitagawa	NFP	61,084	38.3	19,297	Taizo Masago	LDP	26.2
Osaka 17th	Shingo Nishimura	NFP	72,359	42.7	20,905	Sumi Fujita	JCP	30.4
Osaka 18th	Taro Nakayama	LDP	88,147	41.8	9,325	Yasuto Onishi	NFP	37.4
Osaka 19th	Kenshiro Matsunami	NFP	73,018	48.4	19,112	Hisakazu Ikejiri	LDP	35.7
Hyogo 1st	Hajime Ishii	NFP	52,064	33.6	1,883	Keisuke Sunada	LDP	32.4
Hyogo 2nd	Kazuyoshi Akaba	NFP	63,676	34.2	9,106	Toru Okutani	LDP	29.3
Hyogo 3rd	Ryuichi Doi	DRP	57,368	34.8	16,812	Shigehiko Okuyama	LDP	24.6
Hyogo 4th	Kiichi Inoue	NFP	110,873	49.5	45,649	Shunichi Konishi	LDP	29.1
Hyogo 5th	Yoichi Tani	LDP	108,180	47.9	16,191	Kenji Yoshioka	DRP	40.7
Hyogo 6th	Yuriko Koike	NFP	89,672	38.3	8,274	Yoshihide Sakaue	LDP	34.7
Hyogo 7th	Takako Doi	SDP	102,684	46.6	31,396	Eiji Imanishi	NFP	32.3
Hyogo 8th	Tetsuzo Fuyushiba	NFP	70,849	34.3	15,005	Kunihiko Muroi	LDP	27.0
Hyogo 9th	Ichizo Miyamoto	NFP	75,274	38.4	7,945	Kenzaburo Hara	LDP	34.4
Hyogo 10th	Susumu Shiota	NFP	77,919	43.1	3,304	Kisaburo Tokai	NPS	41.3
Hyogo 11th	Tōru Toida	LDP	64,896	32.8	3,711	Takeshi Goto	NFP	30.9
Hyogo 12th	Saburo Komoto	LDP	94,936	48.7	14,528	Tsuyoshi Yamaguchi	NFP	41.3
Nara 1st	Sanae Takaichi	NFP	60,507	37.0	10,258	Masahiro Morioka	LDP	30.7
Nara 2nd	Makoto Taki	LDP	65,679	41.3	19,842	Hirotaka Kamata	NFP	28.8
Nara 3rd	Seisuke Okuno	LDP	72,682	42.1	8,011	Koji Morimoto	NFP	37.5
Nara 4th	Takeshi Maeda	NFP	80,397	44.6	638	Ryotaro Tanose	LDP	44.2
Wakayama 1st	Keisuke Nakanishi	NFP	66,428	35.9	8,309	Takuso Tabita	Ind.	31.4
Wakayama 2nd	Mitsuzo Kishimoto	LDP	74,734	52.5	26,686	Yōsuke Tsuruho	NFP	33.7
Wakayama 3rd	Toshihiro Nikai	NFP	115,681	49.2	14,607	Minoru Noda	LDP	43.0

Proportional representation results
Party	Votes	Seats	Rank	Elected member	Constituency	Ratio
NFP	2,567,452 (29.2%)	10	1	Yasuko Ikenobō		
NFP	2,567,452 (29.2%)	10	2	Mikio Omi		
NFP	2,567,452 (29.2%)	10	3	Tetsuji Kubo		
NFP	2,567,452 (29.2%)	10	4	Masao Akamatsu		
NFP	2,567,452 (29.2%)	10	5	Hiroyoshi Nishi		
NFP	2,567,452 (29.2%)	10	6	Takashi Yamamoto		
NFP	2,567,452 (29.2%)	10	7	Shigeki Sato		
NFP	2,567,452 (29.2%)	10	8	Osamu Yoshida		
NFP	2,567,452 (29.2%)	10	9	Setsuya Kagita		
NFP	2,567,452 (29.2%)	10	10	Kyokudōzan Kazuyasu		
LDP	2,497,411 (28.4%)	10	1	Ryotaro Tanose	Nara 4th	99.2%
LDP	2,497,411 (28.4%)	10	1	Shigehiko Okuyama	Kyoto 3rd	97.8%
LDP	2,497,411 (28.4%)	10	1	Keisuke Sunada	Hyogo 1st	96.3%
LDP	2,497,411 (28.4%)	10	1	Makoto Mekata	Shiga 1st	95.5%
LDP	2,497,411 (28.4%)	10	1	Takashi Tanihata	Osaka 14th	93.3%
LDP	2,497,411 (28.4%)	10	1	Takuji Yanagimoto	Osaka 3rd	92.2%
LDP	2,497,411 (28.4%)	10	1	Yoshihide Sakaue	Hyogo 6th	90.7%
LDP	2,497,411 (28.4%)	10	1	Kenzaburo Hara	Hyogo 9th	89.4%
LDP	2,497,411 (28.4%)	10	1	Minoru Noda	Wakayama 3rd	87.3%
LDP	2,497,411 (28.4%)	10	1	Masaaki Nakayama	Osaka 4th	86.6%
JCP	1,539,172 (17.5%)	6	2	Mitsuo Higashinaka	Osaka 5th	74.5%
JCP	1,539,172 (17.5%)	6	3	Keiji Kokuta	Kyoto 1st	95.7%
JCP	1,539,172 (17.5%)	6	4	Ikuko Ishii	Osaka 2nd	62.9%
JCP	1,539,172 (17.5%)	6	5	Sumi Fujita	Osaka 17th	71.1%
JCP	1,539,172 (17.5%)	6	6	Daiichi Tsuji	Nara 1st	55.8%
JCP	1,539,172 (17.5%)	6	7	Yoko Fujiki	Hyogo 8th	58.1%
DP	1,223,192 (13.9%)	5	1	Satoru Ienishi	Nara 1st	31.3%
DP	1,223,192 (13.9%)	5	2	Miyoko Hida	Osaka 10th	63.0%
DP	1,223,192 (13.9%)	5	3	Issei Inoue	Osaka 8th	46.2%
DP	1,223,192 (13.9%)	5	4	Seiji Maehara	Kyoto 2nd	72.5%
DP	1,223,192 (13.9%)	5	4	Tsutomu Yamamoto	Shiga 1st	50.4%
SDP	542,047 (6.2%)	2	1	Kiyomi Tsujimoto		
SDP	542,047 (6.2%)	2	2	Tomoka Nakagawa		

== Chugoku block ==
1996 Japanese general election in Chugoku
- 20 October 1996

All 34 seats to the House of Representatives
	Majority party	Minority party	Third party
Party	LDP	NFP	DP
Constituency	19	1	0
PR seats	6	3	2
Total	25	4	2
	Fourth party	Fifth party
Party	JCP	SDP
Constituency	0	0
PR seats	1	1
Total	1	1

Single-member constituency results in Chugoku
Constituency	Elected member		Votes	%	Margin	Runner-up		%
Tottori 1st	Shigeru Ishiba	Ind.	94,147	62.5	65,651	Fumiko Chikuma	SDP	18.9
Tottori 2nd	Hideyuki Aizawa	LDP	69,256	46.4	5,057	Osamu Yamauchi	NFP	43.1
Shimane 1st	Hiroyuki Hosoda	LDP	73,907	52.1	27,426	Daikichi Ishibashi	DP	32.8
Shimane 2nd	Noboru Takeshita	LDP	86,462	54.4	23,672	Atsushi Nishikori	NPS	39.5
Shimane 3rd	Hisaoki Kamei	LDP	82,526	58.2	52,213	Hiromasa Ohashi	NFP	21.4
Okayama 1st	Ichiro Aisawa	LDP	116,639	61.1	61,988	Katsuyuki Hikasa	NFP	28.6
Okayama 2nd	Akihiko Kumashiro	LDP	88,569	54.8	37,018	Shingo Nakagiri	DP	31.9
Okayama 3rd	Takeo Hiranuma	LDP	130,101	65.3	76,448	Noriyasu Nishioka	NFP	26.9
Okayama 4th	Ryutaro Hashimoto	LDP	152,595	68.0	95,949	Mutsuki Kato	NFP	25.2
Okayama 5th	Yoshitaka Murata	LDP	125,188	66.8	82,633	Kyoko Kiguchi	DP	22.7
Hiroshima 1st	Fumio Kishida	LDP	64,709	44.1	22,601	Koji Nakahara	NFP	28.7
Hiroshima 2nd	Toshinobu Awaya	NFP	67,876	34.7	6,908	Jin Hinokida	LDP	31.2
Hiroshima 3rd	Katsuyuki Kawai	LDP	65,928	38.3	8,412	Yoshitake Masuhara	NFP	33.4
Hiroshima 4th	Hidenao Nakagawa	LDP	97,056	69.7	69,181	Tamie Akimitsu	NSP	20.0
Hiroshima 5th	Yukihiko Ikeda	LDP	105,602	59.7	59,753	Churyo Morii	DP	25.9
Hiroshima 6th	Shizuka Kamei	LDP	122,071	48.8	33,680	Koji Sato	NFP	35.4
Hiroshima 7th	Kiichi Miyazawa	LDP	95,045	47.3	25,442	Minoru Yanagida	NFP	34.7
Yamaguchi 1st	Masahiko Kōmura	LDP	125,924	72.6	86,656	Hirotake Hayashi	JCP	22.6
Yamaguchi 2nd	Shinji Satō	LDP	81,108	38.6	2,164	Masuo Matsuoka	NFP	37.6
Yamaguchi 3rd	Takeo Kawamura	LDP	108,995	69.5	79,658	Korekiyo Tenmaya	JCP	18.7
Yamaguchi 4th	Shinzo Abe	LDP	93,459	54.3	33,783	Takaaki Koga	NFP	34.7

Proportional representation results
Party	Votes	Seats	Rank	Elected member	Constituency	Ratio
LDP	1,578,140 (42.8%)	6	1	Kazuko Nose		
LDP	1,578,140 (42.8%)	6	2	Yoshio Sakurauchi		
LDP	1,578,140 (42.8%)	6	3	Yoshiro Hayashi		
LDP	1,578,140 (42.8%)	6	4	Kazuo Tanikawa		
LDP	1,578,140 (42.8%)	6	5	Kozo Hirabayashi		
LDP	1,578,140 (42.8%)	6	6	Jin Hinokida	Hiroshima 2nd	89.8%
NFP	883,319 (24.0%)	3	1	Tetsuo Saito		
NFP	883,319 (24.0%)	3	2	Keigo Masuya		
NFP	883,319 (24.0%)	3	3	Mutsuki Kato	Okayama 4th	37.1%
DP	464,197 (12.6%)	2	1	Daikichi Ishibashi	Shimane 1st	62.8%
DP	464,197 (12.6%)	2	1	Shingo Nakagiri	Okayama 2nd	58.2%
JCP	356,108 (9.7%)	1	1	Seiji Masamori		
SDP	234,642 (6.4%)	1	1	Tadatoshi Akiba	Hiroshima 2nd	70.9%

== Shikoku block ==
1996 Japanese general election in Shikoku
- 20 October 1996

All 20 seats to the House of Representatives
	Majority party	Minority party
Party	LDP	NFP
Constituency	10	1
PR seats	3	2
Total	13	3
	Third party	Fourth party
Party	DP	JCP
Constituency	1	1
PR seats	1	1
Total	2	2

Single-member constituency results in Shikoku
Constituency	Elected member		Votes	%	Margin	Runner-up		%
Tokushima 1st	Yoshito Sengoku	DP	47,057	37.7	5,924	Toshiji Miki	LDP	33.0
Tokushima 2nd	Shunichi Yamaguchi	LDP	86,663	73.0	70,087	Kouichi Kakoi	JCP	14.0
Tokushima 3rd	Yoshihito Iwasa	NFP	64,762	47.6	3,649	Shinzo Miki	LDP	44.9
Kagawa 1st	Takao Fujimoto	LDP	62,612	36.3	7,034	Takuya Hirai	NFP	32.2
Kagawa 2nd	Yoshio Kimura	LDP	98,531	78.7	71,873	Hisashi Matsumura	JCP	21.3
Kagawa 3rd	Yoshinori Ohno	LDP	79,870	48.9	17,402	Shigeaki Tsukihara	NFP	38.3
Ehime 1st	Katsutsugu Sekiya	LDP	90,305	45.3	4,511	Tokihiro Nakamura	NFP	43.1
Ehime 2nd	Seiichiro Murakami	LDP	118,966	70.3	91,906	Yukio Umezaki	SDP	16.0
Ehime 3rd	Shinya Ono	LDP	80,415	52.0	41,931	Takatoshi Fujita	SDP	24.9
Ehime 4th	Koichi Yamamoto	LDP	113,587	61.0	4,511	Eigo Takahashi	NFP	32.9
Kochi 1st	Kenjiro Yamahara	JCP	33,523	28.6	2,132	Masanori Goto	DP	26.7
Kochi 2nd	Gen Nakatani	LDP	72,772	62.9	46,754	Haruyuki Tanizaki	JCP	22.5
Kochi 3rd	Yūji Yamamoto	LDP	72,961	56.1	35,477	Masaru Hirota	Ind.	28.8

Proportional representation results
Party	Votes	Seats	Rank	Elected member	Constituency	Ratio
LDP	783,589 (41.6%)	3	1	Ihei Ochi		
LDP	783,589 (41.6%)	3	2	Mamoru Nishida		
LDP	783,589 (41.6%)	3	3	Hajime Morita		
NFP	455,269 (24.2%)	2	1	Kazuyoshi Endo		
NFP	455,269 (24.2%)	2	2	Shozo Nishimura		
DP	245,323 (13.0%)	1	1	Masanori Goto	Kochi 1st	93.6%
JCP	227,014 (12.1%)	1	2	Naoaki Haruna	Kochi 3rd	26.8%

== Kyushu block ==
1996 Japanese general election in Kyushu
- 20 October 1996

All 61 seats to the House of Representatives
	Majority party	Minority party	Third party
Party	LDP	NFP	SDP
Constituency	22	11	3
PR seats	9	7	2
Total	31	18	5
	Fourth party	Fifth party	Sixth party
Party	DP	JCP	NPS
Constituency	1	0	1
PR seats	3	2	0
Total	4	2	1

Single-member constituency results in Kyushu
Constituency	Elected member		Votes	%	Margin	Runner-up		%
Fukuoka 1st	Ryu Matsumoto	DP	74,537	46.7	17,789	Touji Nishida	LDP	35.5
Fukuoka 2nd	Taku Yamasaki	LDP	98,095	49.2	25,029	Hirotaro Yamasaki	NFP	36.7
Fukuoka 3rd	Seiichi Ota	LDP	88,953	49.0	22,165	Kinya Narazaki	NFP	36.8
Fukuoka 4th	Tomoyoshi Watanabe	LDP	86,765	50.4	24,714	Junji Higashi	NFP	36.1
Fukuoka 5th	Yoshiaki Harada	LDP	85,399	43.2	19,046	Mikito Kusuda	NFP	33.6
Fukuoka 6th	Masahiro Koga	NFP	106,262	53.6	34,520	Ken Neshiro	LDP	36.2
Fukuoka 7th	Makoto Koga	LDP	90,432	42.2	21,127	Koichi Shiotsuka	NFP	32.4
Fukuoka 8th	Tarō Asō	LDP	114,408	50.5	33,434	Junsuke Iwata	DP	35.7
Fukuoka 9th	Kenji Kitahashi	NFP	91,757	42.6	14,783	Asahiko Mihara	NPS	35.7
Fukuoka 10th	Shozaburo Jimi	LDP	95,967	43.9	14,289	Kazuo Hirotomo	NFP	37.4
Fukuoka 11th	Kozo Yamamoto	NFP	66,798	38.6	15,229	Sekisuke Nakanishi	SDP	29.8
Saga 1st	Kazuhiro Haraguchi	NFP	62,515	39.0	2,229	Takanori Sakai	LDP	37.6
Saga 2nd	Masahiro Imamura	LDP	75,072	55.8	25,735	Toshihiko Yoko	NFP	36.7
Saga 3rd	Kosuke Hori	LDP	91,871	68.0	69,462	Toshimasa Amamoto	NFP	16.6
Nagasaki 1st	Takeo Nishioka	NFP	84,464	41.1	12,965	Daisuke Miyajima	LDP	34.8
Nagasaki 2nd	Fumio Kyūma	LDP	104,538	51.4	20,163	Kenichiro Hatsumura	NFP	41.5
Nagasaki 3rd	Kazuo Torashima	LDP	79,735	52.2	14,651	Masahiko Yamada	NFP	42.6
Nagasaki 4th	Genjirō Kaneko	LDP	95,117	50.4	38,714	Kuro Matsuda	NFP	29.9
Kumamoto 1st	Morihiro Hosokawa	NFP	85,682	44.4	36,576	Eiichi Iwashita	LDP	25.4
Kumamoto 2nd	Takeshi Noda	NFP	97,242	50.2	17,992	Takeshi Hayashida	LDP	40.9
Kumamoto 3rd	Toshikatsu Matsuoka	LDP	80,725	45.1	1,265	Hirohide Uozumi	NFP	44.4
Kumamoto 4th	Hiroyuki Sonoda	NPS	117,441	59.0	44,210	Kimihiro Yasuda	NFP	36.8
Kumamoto 5th	Masayoshi Yagami	NFP	84,275	49.5	7,545	Noriaki Watase	LDP	45.0
Oita 1st	Tomiichi Murayama	SDP	106,258	59.5	48,957	Seiichi Eto	LDP	32.1
Oita 2nd	Seishirō Etō	LDP	100,809	74.2	79,920	Terumi Kamikawa	LL	15.4
Oita 3rd	Eijiro Hata	NFP	77,936	50.7	14,496	Tetsuro Makino	LDP	41.3
Oita 4th	Katsuhiko Yokomitsu	SDP	86,068	51.1	8,447	Takeshi Iwaya	NFP	46.1
Miyazaki 1st	Nariaki Nakayama	LDP	78,145	41.1	2,993	Takashi Yonezawa	NFP	39.6
Miyazaki 2nd	Takami Eto	LDP	106,858	55.5	33,305	Toshimichi Tanikawa	NFP	38.2
Miyazaki 3rd	Kazumi Mochinaga	LDP	89,671	53.1	27,460	Yoshihisa Furukawa	NFP	36.8
Kagoshima 1st	Okiharu Yasuoka	LDP	70,659	48.1	12,898	Hiroshi Kawauchi	DP	39.4
Kagoshima 2nd	Shuko Sonoda	LDP	87,471	47.9	3,023	Torao Tokuda	LL	46.3
Kagoshima 3rd	Tadahiro Matsushita	LDP	107,385	65.8	65,726	Shinichiro Hirata	NFP	25.5
Kagoshima 4th	Sadatoshi Ozato	LDP	98,933	63.3	50,938	Kenichi Hamada	SDP	30.7
Kagoshima 5th	Sadanori Yamanaka	LDP	106,373	61.3	48,026	Ryoichi Hashiguchi	LL	33.6
Okinawa 1st	Taiichi Shiraho	NFP	52,975	30.2	5,596	Saneyoshi Furugen	JCP	27.0
Okinawa 2nd	Seiji Nakamura	NFP	66,421	41.3	14,732	Aichi Nakamoto	Ind.	32.2
Okinawa 3rd	Kosuke Uehara	SDP	80,534	47.0	34,943	Chiken Kakazu	LDP	26.6

Proportional representation results
Party	Votes	Seats	Rank	Elected member	Constituency	Ratio
LDP	2,342,094 (35.6%)	9	1	Seiichi Eto	Oita 1st	53.9%
LDP	2,342,094 (35.6%)	9	2	Hisao Horinouchi		
LDP	2,342,094 (35.6%)	9	3	Tokuo Yamashita		
LDP	2,342,094 (35.6%)	9	4	Yoshiyuki Touya		
LDP	2,342,094 (35.6%)	9	5	Ichizo Ohara		
LDP	2,342,094 (35.6%)	9	6	Kazuaki Miyaji		
LDP	2,342,094 (35.6%)	9	7	Mikio Shimoji	Okinawa 1st	83.9%
LDP	2,342,094 (35.6%)	9	7	Chiken Kakazu	Okinawa 3rd	56.6%
LDP	2,342,094 (35.6%)	9	9	Takanori Sakai		
NFP	1,856,406 (28.2%)	7	1	Koichiro Aino		
NFP	1,856,406 (28.2%)	7	2	Takenori Kanzaki		
NFP	1,856,406 (28.2%)	7	3	Yoshiaki Takaki		
NFP	1,856,406 (28.2%)	7	4	Issei Koga		
NFP	1,856,406 (28.2%)	7	5	Tsuneo Gondo		
NFP	1,856,406 (28.2%)	7	6	Eiki Kurata		
NFP	1,856,406 (28.2%)	7	7	Naozumi Shimazu		
DP	707,011 (10.8%)	3	1	Yuiko Matsumoto		
DP	707,011 (10.8%)	3	2	Hiroshi Kawauchi	Kagoshima 1st	81.7%
DP	707,011 (10.8%)	3	2	Junsuke Iwata	Fukuoka 8th	70.7%
SDP	667,244 (10.1%)	2	1	Sekisuke Nakanishi	Fukuoka 11th	77.2%
SDP	667,244 (10.1%)	2	1	Kenichi Hamada	Kagoshima 4th	48.5%
JCP	634,728 (9.7%)	2	1	Hidekatsu Yoshii		
JCP	634,728 (9.7%)	2	2	Saneyoshi Furuken	Okinawa 1st	89.4%

== Leaders' races ==
Results for party leaders
Party	Member	Constituency	Votes	%	Position	Status
LDP	Ryutaro Hashimoto	Okayama 4th	152,595	68.0	1st	Re-elected
NFP	Ichirō Ozawa	Iwate 4th	125,619	64.7	1st	Re-elected
DP	Naoto Kan	Tokyo 18th	116,910	62.4	1st	Re-elected
DP	Yukio Hatoyama	Hokkaido 9th	131,936	52.8	1st	Re-elected
JCP	Tetsuzo Fuwa	Tokyo PR	923,764	17.8	1st	Re-elected
SDP	Takako Doi	Hyogo 7th	102,684	46.6	1st	Re-elected
NPS	Shōichi Ide	Nagano 3rd	70,960	27.5	2nd	Defeated
DRP	Teiko Sasano	House of Councillors				

== Closest races ==
Candidates with a narrow loss ratio of over 90%
Constituency	Candidate		Votes	%	Ratio
Chiba 4th	Yoshihiko Noda	NFP	73,687	31.9	99.9
Fukushima 5th	Naoki Tanaka	LDP	78,690	38.1	99.6
Mie 1st	Jirō Kawasaki	LDP	89,359	45.0	99.5
Saitama 2nd	Yoshitaka Shindō	LDP	75,642	36.3	99.2
Nara 4th	Ryotaro Tanose	LDP	79,759	44.2	99.2
Miyagi 6th	Masamitsu Oishi	NFP	70,114	44.6	99.1
Aomori 2nd	Shingo Mimura	NFP	62,907	41.4	98.8
Saitama 14th	Eisuke Yamada	NFP	76,121	39.3	98.5
Kanagawa 1st	Kenichiro Sato	DP	54,494	26.0	98.4
Kumamoto 3rd	Hirohide Uozumi	NFP	79,460	44.4	98.4
Kanagawa 12th	Yoichiro Esaki	NFP	50,511	30.1	98.3
Tokyo 20th	Seiichiro Shimizu	LDP	54,582	26.5	98.2
Tokyo 12th	Tamaki Sawa	NFP	60,289	27.9	98.1
Kanagawa 10th	Kazunori Tanaka	LDP	68,892	30.6	98.0
Kyoto 2nd	Satoshi Inoue	JCP	42,211	28.7	98.0
Kyoto 3rd	Shigehiko Okuyama	LDP	57,241	33.9	97.9
Ishikawa 3rd	Tomiro Yata	Ind.	90,798	44.5	97.8
Kanagawa 13th	Akira Amari	LDP	72,022	33.2	97.6
Yamaguchi 2nd	Masuo Matsuoka	NFP	78,944	37.6	97.3
Aichi 8th	Yusuke Morita	NFP	90,099	43.0	96.8
Mie 4th	Akihiko Noro	NFP	75,795	46.2	96.7
Kagoshima 2nd	Torao Tokuda	LL	84,448	46.3	96.5
Hyogo 1st	Keisuke Sunada	LDP	50,181	32.4	96.4
Saga 1st	Takanori Sakai	LDP	60,286	37.6	96.4
Miyazaki 1st	Takashi Yonezawa	NFP	75,152	39.6	96.2
Fukushima 3rd	Kōichirō Genba	DP	88,214	44.4	96.1
Tokyo 14th	Midori Matsushima	LDP	58,581	33.2	96.0
Niigata 6th	Nobutaka Tsutsui	Ind.	103,307	46.4	96.0
Kyoto 1st	Keiji Kokuta	JCP	60,441	30.0	95.8
Hyogo 10th	Kisaburo Tokai	NPS	74,615	41.3	95.8
Saitama 12th	Toshio Kojima	LDP	72,827	38.6	95.7
Aichi 5th	Takahide Kimura	LDP	46,485	29.5	95.6
Shiga 1st	Makoto Mekata	LDP	53,476	33.2	95.5
Osaka 15th	Shuji Kitagawa	NFP	77,876	37.8	95.4
Chiba 9th	Kenichi Mizuno	LDP	75,667	34.5	95.1
Ehime 1st	Tokihiro Nakamura	NFP	85,794	43.1	95.0
Hokkaido 3rd	Satoshi Arai	DP	51,479	25.0	94.8
Hokkaido 7th	Yasuki Sakuraba	DP	62,549	32.6	94.8
Niigata 2nd	Motohiko Kondo	Ind.	98,044	38.5	94.5
Gifu 1st	Iwao Matsuda	NFP	66,892	35.1	94.5
Tokushima 3rd	Shinzo Miki	LDP	61,113	44.9	94.4
Hyogo 11th	Takeshi Goto	NFP	61,185	30.9	94.3
Saitama 8th	Masanori Arai	LDP	47,784	29.4	94.2
Saitama 1st	Takujiro Hamada	NFP	79,930	36.6	93.9
Chiba 5th	Masaru Kanou	LDP	62,951	30.3	93.9
Kanagawa 3rd	Hachiro Okonogi	LDP	56,700	29.4	93.9
Hokkaido 3rd	Wakio Mitsui	NFP	50,902	24.7	93.8
Kochi 1st	Masanori Goto	DP	31,391	26.7	93.6
Kanagawa 2nd	Akihiro Ueda	NFP	65,905	30.2	93.5
Fukushima 4th	Fumiaki Saito	LDP	87,643	45.5	93.3
Osaka 14th	Takashi Tanihata	LDP	79,347	35.5	93.3
Fukui 3rd	Tsuyoshi Takagi	LDP	48,762	34.2	92.9
Tottori 2nd	Osamu Yamauchi	NFP	64,199	43.1	92.7
Tokyo 3rd	Jin Matsubara	NFP	67,653	29.8	92.6
Osaka 3rd	Takuji Yanagimoto	LDP	71,012	32.9	92.3
Tokyo 13th	Nobuyoshi Kondo	LDP	65,191	32.3	92.2
Niigata 1st	Nobuyuki Sekiyama	Ind.	81,037	39.3	92.2
Shizuoka 6th	Mitsuo Sakurada	Ind.	55,840	29.1	92.1
Miyagi 5th	Kimio Doi	NFP	50,139	36.8	91.9
Miyagi 2nd	Masashi Nakano	NFP	62,533	32.9	91.8
Tokyo 22nd	Sadao Yamahana	DP	63,974	27.1	91.8
Osaka 13th	Masajuro Shiokawa	LDP	83,254	37.9	91.7
Kanagawa 1st	Masahisa Okabe	NFP	50,684	24.2	91.6
Aichi 13th	Hideaki Ōmura	LDP	80,629	42.9	91.6
Kanagawa 6th	Ryushi Tsuchida	NFP	55,182	28.4	91.5
Hokkaido 4th	Koji Suzuki	NFP	53,332	28.1	91.4
Shizuoka 6th	Hiroyasu Kurihara	LDP	55,374	28.8	91.4
Kumamoto 5th	Noriaki Watase	LDP	76,730	45.0	91.0
Chiba 6th	Yukio Ubukata	DP	55,272	35.7	90.9
Hyogo 6th	Yoshihide Sakaue	LDP	81,398	34.7	90.8
Tokyo 8th	Hiroshi Yamada	NFP	67,670	29.5	90.4
Kyoto 3rd	Yasuhide Yamana	NFP	52,884	31.4	90.4
Kochi 1st	Noritoshi Ishida	NFP	30,281	25.8	90.3
Tochigi 5th	Hatsuhiro Shindo	NFP	70,067	42.8	90.2
Chiba 8th	Hiroyuki Nagahama	NFP	62,740	30.7	90.2
Oita 4th	Takeshi Iwaya	NFP	77,621	46.1	90.2
