= Osaka 5th district =

- Parliamentary constituency for the Japanese House of Representatives
- Numbered map of the Osaka city single seats
- Prefecture: Osaka
- Proportional District: Kinki
- Electorate: 434,254

Current constituency
- Created: 1994
- Seats: One
- Party: Ishin
- Representative: Satoshi Umemura
- Municipalities: Higashiyodogawa-ku, Konohana-ku, Nishiyodogawa-ku, and Yodogawa-ku of Osaka.

Osaka 5th district (大阪府第5区, Osaka-fu dai-goku or simply 大阪5区, Osaka-goku ) is a single-member constituency of the House of Representatives in the national Diet of Japan located in Osaka Prefecture.

== Areas covered ==
=== Since 1994 ===
- Part of Osaka
  - Higashiyodogawa-ku
  - Konohana-ku
  - Nishiyodogawa-ku
  - Yodogawa-ku

== List of representatives ==
Election	Representative	Party	Notes
1996	Takayoshi Taniguchi	New Frontier	
2000	Takayoshi Taniguchi	Komeito	
2003	Takayoshi Taniguchi	Komeito	
2005	Takayoshi Taniguchi	Komeito	
2009	Tetsuo Inami	Democratic	
2012	Tōru Kunishige	Komeito	
2014	Tōru Kunishige	Komeito	
2017	Tōru Kunishige	Komeito	
2021	Tōru Kunishige	Komeito	
2024	Satoshi Umemura	Ishin	
2026	Satoshi Umemura	Ishin	

== Election results ==
=== 2026 ===
2026
Party	Candidate	Votes	%	±%
Ishin	Satoshi Umemura	93,472	42.5	▲2.65
LDP	Mio Sugita	48,051	21.9	
DPP	Hidemichi Maeda	24,018	10.9	
Reiwa	Akiko Ōishi	19,867	9.0	▼2.2
Sanseitō	Keiko Matsuyama	18,421	8.4	▲1.95
JCP	Ryūsuke Minato	15,854	7.2	▼4.0
Registered electors		432,748		
Turnout			53.92	▲1.96
Ishin hold				

=== 2024 ===
2024
Party	Candidate	Votes	%	±%
Ishin	Satoshi Umemura	87,100	39.90	New
Komeito	Tōru Kunishige	65,872	30.18	
Reiwa	Akiko Ōishi (Won PR seat)	26,789	12.27	
JCP	Takeshi Miyamoto	24,480	11.21	
Sanseitō	Atsushi Ishibashi	14,054	6.44	New
Majority		21,228	9.72	
Registered electors		431,697		
Turnout			51.96	▼1.02
Ishin gain from Komeito				

=== 2021 ===
2021
Party	Candidate	Votes	%	±%
Komeito	Tōru Kunishige	106,508	53.14	
JCP	Takeshi Miyamoto (Won PR seat)	48,248	24.07	
Reiwa	Akiko Ōishi (Won PR seat)	34,202	17.07	New
Independent	Junko Kagoike	11,458	5.72	New
Majority		58,260	29.07	
Registered electors		431,558		
Turnout			52.98	▲7.52
Komeito hold				

=== 2017 ===
2017
Party	Candidate	Votes	%	±%
Komeito	Tōru Kunishige	91,514	51.48	
CDP	Hideki Nagao (Won PR seat)	45,313	25.49	New
JCP	Ryozo Kitayama	31,429	17.68	
Happiness Realization	Keigo Kazumori	9,522	5.36	N/A
Majority		46,201	25.99	
Registered electors		426,084		
Turnout			45.46	▼0.24
Komeito hold				

=== 2014 ===
2014
Party	Candidate	Votes	%	±%
Komeito	Tōru Kunishige	92,681	57.53	
JCP	Misuzu Ishii	68,430	42.47	
Majority		24,251	15.06	
Registered electors		414,245		
Turnout			45.70	
Komeito hold				

=== 2012 ===
2012
Party	Candidate	Votes	%	±%
Komeito	Tōru Kunishige	111,028	53.80	
JCP	Kazumasa Seto	48,958	23.72	
Democratic	Kanako Otsuji	46,378	22.47	
Majority		62,070	30.08	
Registered electors				
Turnout				
Komeito gain from Democratic				

=== 2009 ===
2009
Party	Candidate	Votes	%	±%
Democratic	Tetsuo Inami	121,210	46.74	
Komeito	Takayoshi Taniguchi	97,604	37.64	
JCP	Kiyoshi Himeno	35,405	13.65	
Happiness Realization	Takeshi Yanagi	5,113	1.97	New
Majority		23,606	9.10	
Registered electors				
Turnout				
Democratic gain from Komeito				

=== 2005 ===
2005
Party	Candidate	Votes	%	±%
Komeito	Takayoshi Taniguchi	118,574	47.67	
Democratic	Tetsuo Inami	87,002	34.97	
JCP	Yoshiki Yamashita	43,189	17.36	
Majority		31,572	12.70	
Registered electors				
Turnout				
Komeito hold				

=== 2003 ===
2003
Party	Candidate	Votes	%	±%
Komeito	Takayoshi Taniguchi	92,350	42.88	
Democratic	Tetsuo Inami (Won PR seat)	85,334	39.62	
JCP	Yoshiki Yamashita	37,694	17.50	
Majority		7,016	3.26	
Registered electors				
Turnout				
Komeito hold				

=== 2000 ===
2000
Party	Candidate	Votes	%	±%
Komeito	Takayoshi Taniguchi	79,018	37.28	New
Democratic	Tetsuo Inami	66,679	31.46	New
JCP	Mitsuo Higashinaka	55,225	26.06	
Liberal League	Takuma Inoue	11,021	5.20	New
Majority		12,339	5.82	
Registered electors				
Turnout				
Komeito hold				

=== 1996 ===
1996
Party	Candidate	Votes	%	±%
New Frontier	Takayoshi Taniguchi	74,925	36.33	New
JCP	Mitsuo Higashinaka (Won PR seat)	55,846	27.08	New
LDP	Yasuhide Nakayama	43,143	20.92	New
Democratic	Tetsuo Inami	32,299	15.66	New
Majority		19,079	9.25	
Registered electors				
Turnout				
New Frontier win (new seat)				
