= Tomoka =

- Gender: Female

Origin
- Origin: Japanese
- Meaning: Different meanings depending on the kanji used

Tomoka (written: 友香, 智香, 智花, 朋香, 朋佳, 友花 or ともか in hiragana) is a feminine Japanese given name. Notable people with the name include:

- Tomoka Igari (猪狩 ともか; born 1991), Japanese idol
- Tomoka Inaba (稲葉 ともか; born 2002), Japanese professional wrestler
- Tomoka Kimura (木村 友香; born 1994), Japanese long-distance runner
- Tomoka Kiriyama (桐山 智花; born 1984), Japanese voice actress
- Tomoka Kurokawa (黒川 智花; born 1989), Japanese actress
- Tomoka Kurotani (黒谷 友香; born 1975), Japanese actress
- Tomoka Miyazaki (宮崎 友花; born 2006), Japanese badminton player
- Tomoka Nakagawa (中川 ともか; born 1981), Japanese professional wrestler
- Tomoka Nakagawa (politician) (中川 智子; born 1947), Japanese politician
- Tomoka Nishimura (西村 朝香; born 1986), Japanese member of the Zone (band)
- Tomoka Nishiyama (西山 朋佳; born 1995), Japanese shogi player
- Tomoka Sato (佐藤 友花; born 2001), Japanese artistic swimmer
- Tomoka Shibasaki (柴崎 友香; born 1973), Japanese writer
- Tomoka Takazawa (高沢 朋花; born 2003), Japanese former member of the NGT48
- Tomoka Takeuchi (竹内 智香; born 1983), Japanese snowboarder
- Tomoka Wakabayashi (若林 倫香; born 1996), Japanese former member of the SKE48

== Fictional characters ==
- Tomoka Kayahara (茅原 智香), a character in the manga series Muteki Kanban Musume
- Tomoka Minato (湊 智花), a character in the light novel series Ro-Kyu-Bu!
- Tomoka Osakada (小坂田 朋香), a character in the manga series The Prince of Tennis
- Tomoka Kase (加瀬 友香), a character in the manga series Kase-san
- Tomoka Tenkubashi (天空橋 朋花, Tenkūbashi Tomoka), an idol in The Idolmaster Million Live! voiced out by Kotori Koiwai
- Tomoka Wakabayashi (若林 智香, Wakabayashi Tomoka), an unvoiced idol in The Idolmaster Cinderella Girls
