= Tōru Kunishige =

Japanese politician

- 國重 徹
- Official portrait, 2016

Member of the House of Representatives
- Incumbent
- Assumed office 9 February 2026
- Preceded by: Multi-member district
- Constituency: Kansai PR
- In office 17 December 2012 – 9 October 2024
- Preceded by: Tetsuo Inami
- Succeeded by: Satoshi Umemura
- Constituency: Osaka 5th

Personal details
- Born: 23 November 1974 (age 51) Osaka City, Osaka, Japan
- Party: Komeito (until 2026; since 2026)
- Other political affiliations: CRA (2026)
- Education: Sōka University
- Website: Tōru Kunishige website

Tōru Kunishige (國重 徹, Kunishige Tōru; born 23 November 1974) is a Japanese politician of the Centrist Reform Alliance, who serves as a member of the House of Representatives.

== Early years ==
On 23 November 1974, Kunishige was born in Osaka City, Osaka. After graduating from Sōka University's Faculty of Law, he passed the bar exam in 2002, and registered as an attorney with the Osaka Bar Association in 2004. Later, in 2012, he registered as a certified public tax accountant with the Kinki Federation of Certified Public Tax Accountants' Associations.

== Political career ==
In the 2012 general election, Kunishige ran on the Osaka 5th district as Takayoshi Taniguchi's successor and gained the seat.

In the 2014 general election, he was reelected and secured his second-term.

In the 2017 general election, he was reelected and secured his third-term.

In October 2018, he was appointed as the Parliamentary Vice-Minister for Internal Affairs and Communications in the Fourth Abe first reshuffled cabinet and served until September 2019.

In the 2021 general election, he was reelected and secured his fourth-term.

In the 2024 general election, he lost to Ishin's Satoshi Umemura.

In January 2026, he joined the Centrist Reform Alliance, a new party established by the CDP and Komeito. In the 2026 general election, he won a seat in the PR.
