= Nagano 4th district =

Legislative district of Japan

Nagano 4th District
- Parliamentary constituency for the Japanese House of Representatives
- Numbered map of Nagano Prefecture single-member districts
- Prefecture: Nagano
- Proportional District: Hokurikushin'etsu
- Electorate: 239,642

Current constituency
- Created: 1994
- Seats: One
- Party: Liberal Democratic
- Representative: Shigeyuki Goto
- Municipalities: Chino, Okaya, Shiojiri, Suwa, Kiso District and Suwa District

Nagano 4th district (長野県第4区, Nagano-ken dai-yonku or simply 長野4区, Nagano-yonku) is a single-member constituency of the House of Representatives in the national Diet of Japan located in Nagano Prefecture.

== List of representatives ==
Election	Representative	Party	Notes
1996	Hajime Ogawa	Liberal Democratic	
2000	Shigeyuki Goto	Democratic	Goto left the Democratic Party in 2003 and joined the LDP.
2003	Shigeyuki Goto	Liberal Democratic	Goto left the Democratic Party in 2003 and joined the LDP.
2005	Shigeyuki Goto	Liberal Democratic	Goto left the Democratic Party in 2003 and joined the LDP.
2009	Kōji Yazaki	Democratic	
2012	Shigeyuki Goto	Liberal Democratic	
2014	Shigeyuki Goto	Liberal Democratic	
2017	Shigeyuki Goto	Liberal Democratic	
2021	Shigeyuki Goto	Liberal Democratic	
2024	Shigeyuki Goto	Liberal Democratic	
2026	Shigeyuki Goto	Liberal Democratic	

== Election results ==
2026
Party	Candidate	Votes	%	±%
LDP	Shigeyuki Goto (Incumbent)	77,135	57.56	▼2.66
DPP	Akihisa Hanaoka	34,122	25.46	New
JCP	Ryōsuke Takeda	22,747	16.97	▼22.81
Registered electors		232,782		
Turnout		134,004	59.53	▲2.78
LDP hold				

2024
Party	Candidate	Votes	%	±%
LDP	Shigeyuki Goto (Incumbent)	75,713	60.22	▼2.39
JCP	Ryōsuke Takeda	50,005	39.78	▲2.39
Registered electors		235,193		
Turnout		125,718	56.75	▼2.62
LDP hold				

2021
Party	Candidate	Votes	%	±%
Liberal Democratic	Shigeyuki Goto (Incumbent)	86,962	62.61	▲16.96
Communist	Yukiko Nagase	51,922	37.39	▲10.20
Registered electors		240,401		
Turnout			59.37	▼3.17
LDP hold				

2017
Party	Candidate	Votes	%	±%
Liberal Democratic	Shigeyuki Goto (Incumbent)	68,673	45.65	▼0.42
Communist	Eiko Mōri	40,898	27.19	▲11.08
Kibō no Tō	Yoshiyuki Terashima	40,863	27.16	New
Registered electors		246,516		
Turnout			62.54	▲4.84
LDP hold				

2014
Party	Candidate	Votes	%	±%
Liberal Democratic	Shigeyuki Goto (Incumbent)	63,121	46.07	▲2.20
Democratic	Kōji Yazaki	51,816	37.82	▲7.48
Communist	Hideaki Ueda	22,068	16.11	▲3.51
Registered electors		244,255		
Turnout			57.70	▼7.72
LDP hold				

2012
Party	Candidate	Votes	%	±%
Liberal Democratic	Shigeyuki Goto	68,083	43.87	▲10.44
Democratic	Kōji Yazaki (Incumbent)	47,089	30.34	▼25.93
Tomorrow	Shigeki Miura	20,462	13.19	New
Communist	Hideaki Ueda	19,552	12.60	▲3.82
Registered electors		246,633		
Turnout			65.42	▼11.59
LDP gain from Democratic				

2009
Party	Candidate	Votes	%	±%
Democratic	Kōji Yazaki	106,262	56.27	▲18.64
Liberal Democratic	Shigeyuki Goto (Incumbent)	63,118	33.43	▼16.29
Communist	Hideaki Ueda	16,575	8.78	▼3.87
Happiness Realization	Hiroaki Masuzawa	2,878	1.52	New
Registered electors		249,373		
Turnout			77.01	▲4.96
Democratic gain from LDP				

2005
Party	Candidate	Votes	%	±%
Liberal Democratic	Shigeyuki Goto (Incumbent)	87,859	49.72	▲6.33
Democratic	Ikuo Horigome (Incumbent-Hokurikushin'etsu PR block)	66,503	37.63	▲6.51
Communist	Hideaki Ueda	22,349	12.65	▲3.26
Registered electors		251,779		
Turnout			72.05	▲6.15
LDP hold				

2003
Party	Candidate	Votes	%	±%
Liberal Democratic	Shigeyuki Goto (Incumbent)	70,618	43.39	▲2.70
Democratic	Ikuo Horigome (elected by Hokurikushin'etsu PR block)	50,651	31.12	▼12.72
Social Democratic	Makihiko Hama	26,211	16.10	New
Communist	Hideaki Ueda	15,286	9.39	▼6.08
Registered electors		253,374		
Turnout			65.90	▼6.84
LDP hold				

2000
Party	Candidate	Votes	%	±%
Democratic	Shigeyuki Goto	78,397	43.84	New
Liberal Democratic	Hajime Ogawa (Incumbent)	72,772	40.69	▼2.61
Communist	Hideo Kijima (Incumbent-Hokurikushin'etsu PR block) (reelected by Hokurikushin'etsu PR block)	27,661	15.47	▼2.57
Turnout			72.74	
Democratic gain from LDP				

1996
Party	Candidate	Votes	%	±%
Liberal Democratic	Hajime Ogawa	72,810	43.30	New
New Frontier	Shigeyuki Goto	65,009	38.66	New
Communist	Hideo Kijima (elected by Hokurikushin'etsu PR block)	30,327	18.04	New
Turnout				
