= Satoshi Umemura =

Japanese politician

- 梅村 聡
- Umemura in 2026

Member of the House of Representatives
- Incumbent
- Assumed office 29 October 2024
- Preceded by: Tōru Kunishige
- Constituency: Osaka 5th

Member of the House of Councillors
- In office 29 July 2019 – 15 October 2024
- Preceded by: Multi-member district
- Succeeded by: Kazuyuki Yamaguchi
- Constituency: National PR
- In office 29 July 2007 – 28 July 2013
- Preceded by: Takashi Yamamoto
- Succeeded by: Tōru Azuma
- Constituency: Osaka at-large

Personal details
- Born: 13 February 1975 (age 51) Sakai, Osaka, Japan
- Party: Innovation; One Osaka
- Other political affiliations: Democratic (2007–2013)
- Education: Osaka University

Satoshi Umemura (梅村 聡, Umemura Satoshi; born 13 February 1975) is a Japanese politician of the Japan Innovation Party, who served as a member of the House of Councillors and the House of Representatives in the Diet (national legislature). A native of Sakai, Osaka and graduate of Osaka University, he was elected for the first time in 2007.
