= Harue Yamasaki =

Japanese politician

Harue Yamasaki (山崎晴恵, Yamasaki Harue; born 29 January 1970) is a Japanese lawyer and politician. She was mayor of Takarazuka.

== Life ==
Yamasaki was born on 29 January 1970 in Okayama. She studied law at Kobe University.

Yamasaki began her professional career in the insurance industry before becoming a parliamentary assistant to a member of the House of Councillors. She became a lawyer in 2015 and opened her own practice in Akashi. She specializes in cases related to domestic and spousal violence. In 2020, she opened a practice in Takarazuka.

In February 2020, she met Tomoko Nakagawa , a former member of the Japanese House of Representatives and the current mayor of Takarazuka, who asked her to run for election. Although politically inexperienced, she accepted, as she sympathized with Nakagawa's policies. She officially announced her candidacy in December 2020. She focused her campaign on issues related to education and childcare in the city.

Yamasaki was elected mayor in April 2021, and succeeded Tomoko Nakagawa. In 2025, she did not seek re-election.
