= Shigeyuki Goto =

Japanese politician (born 1955)

- 後藤 茂之
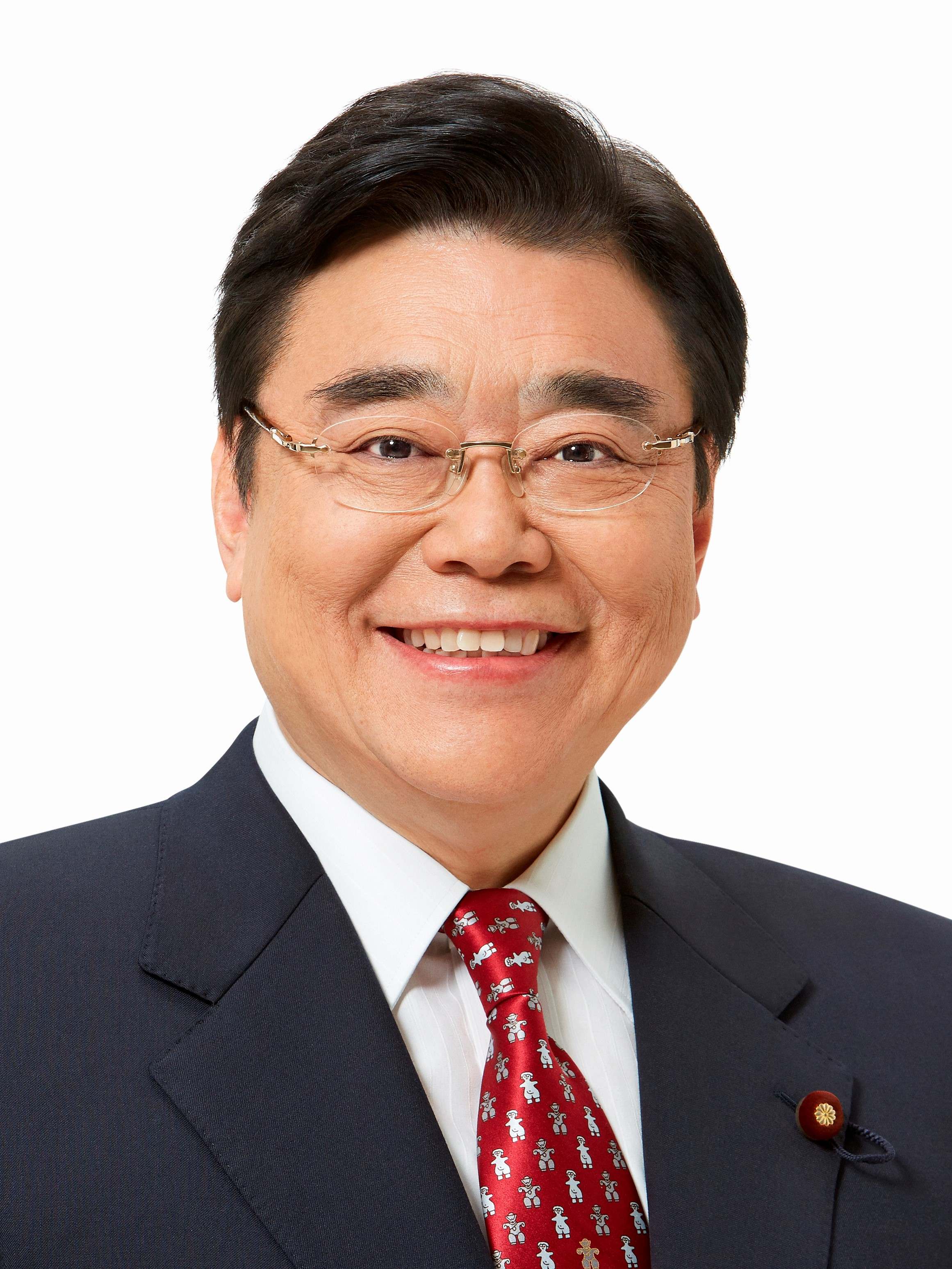
- Official portrait, 2016

Minister of Economic Revitalization
- In office 25 October 2022 – 13 September 2023
- Prime Minister: Fumio Kishida
- Preceded by: Daishiro Yamagiwa
- Succeeded by: Yoshitaka Shindō

Minister of Health, Labour and Welfare
- In office 4 October 2021 – 10 August 2022
- Prime Minister: Fumio Kishida
- Preceded by: Norihisa Tamura
- Succeeded by: Katsunobu Katō

Member of the House of Representatives
- Incumbent
- Assumed office 16 December 2012
- Preceded by: Kōji Yazaki
- Constituency: Nagano 4th
- In office 25 June 2000 – 21 July 2009
- Preceded by: Hajime Ogawa
- Succeeded by: Kōji Yazaki
- Constituency: Nagano 4th

Personal details
- Born: 9 December 1955 (age 70) Minato, Tokyo, Japan
- Party: Liberal Democratic
- Other political affiliations: NFP (1996–1998); DPJ (1998–2003)
- Education: University of Tokyo; Brown University

Shigeyuki Goto (後藤 茂之, Gotō Shigeyuki; born 9 December 1955) is a Japanese politician serving in the House of Representatives.

== Early life ==
Goto is a native of Minato, Tokyo and graduate of the University of Tokyo, he joined the Ministry of Finance in 1980. He also received a master's degree from Brown University as a bureaucrat.

== Political career ==
Goto left the ministry in 1995, and ran unsuccessfully for the Nagano 4th constituency seat in the House of Representatives in the 1996 election as a member of the New Frontier Party. He ran again in 2000 as a member of the Democratic Party of Japan and was elected for the first time.

Goto lost his seat to Kōji Yazaki in the 2009 general election, but reclaimed it once more in 2012, and has continued to hold it since, most recently winning reelection in 2024.

A member of the Liberal Democratic Party, he was selected to become Economic Revitalization Minister in October 2022 upon the cabinet resignation of Daishiro Yamagiwa. Goto previously served as Minister of Health, Labour and Welfare from October 2021 to August 2022.

== Election history ==
Election	Age	District	Political party	Number of votes	election results
1996 Japanese general election	40	Nagano 4th district	NFP	65,009	lost
2000 Japanese general election	44	Nagano 4th district	DPJ	78,397	winning
2003 Japanese general election	47	Nagano 4th district	LDP	70,618	winning
2005 Japanese general election	49	Nagano 4th district	LDP	87,859	winning
2009 Japanese general election	53	Nagano 4th district	LDP	63,118	lost
2012 Japanese general election	57	Nagano 4th district	LDP	68,083	winning
2014 Japanese general election	59	Nagano 4th district	LDP	63,121	winning
2017 Japanese general election	61	Nagano 4th district	LDP	68,673	winning
2021 Japanese general election	65	Nagano 4th district	LDP	86,962	winning
2024 Japanese general election	68	Nagano 4th district	LDP	75,713	winning

Political offices
Preceded by Norihisa Tamura	Minister of Health, Labour, and Welfare; 2021–2022	Succeeded by Katsunobu Katō
