= Osaka 15th district =

- Parliamentary constituency for the Japanese House of Representatives
- Numbered map of the Osaka Prefecture single seats
- Prefecture: Osaka
- Proportional District: Kinki
- Electorate: 377,612

Current constituency
- Created: 1994
- Seats: One
- Party: Ishin
- Representative: Yasuto Urano
- Municipalities: Mihara-ku of Sakai, Kawachinagano, Matsubara, Ōsakasayama, Tondabayashi, and Minamikawachi District.

Osaka 15th district (大阪府第15区, Osaka-fu dai-ju-goku or simply 大阪15区, Osaka-ju-goku ) is a single-member constituency of the House of Representatives in the national Diet of Japan located in Osaka Prefecture.

== Areas covered ==
=== Since 2013 ===
- Part of Sakai
  - Mihara-ku
- Kawachinagano
- Matsubara
- Ōsakasayama
- Tondabayashi
- Minamikawachi District

=== 1994 - 2013 ===
- Kawachinagano
- Matsubara
- Ōsakasayama
- Tondabayashi
- Minamikawachi District

== List of representatives ==
Election	Representative	Party	Notes
1996	Naokazu Takemoto	LDP	
2000	Naokazu Takemoto	LDP	
2003	Naokazu Takemoto	LDP	
2005	Naokazu Takemoto	LDP	
2009	Kei Ohtani	Democratic	
2009	Kei Ohtani	PLF	
2009	Kei Ohtani	Tomorrow	
2012	Yasuto Urano	Restoration	
2012	Yasuto Urano	Innovation	
2014	Naokazu Takemoto	LDP	
2017	Naokazu Takemoto	LDP	
2021	Yasuto Urano	Ishin	
2024	Yasuto Urano	Ishin	
2026	Yasuto Urano	Ishin	

== Election results ==
=== 2026 ===
2026
Party	Candidate	Votes	%	±%
Ishin	Yasuto Urano	92,248	47.9	▲6.6
LDP	Tomoaki Shimada (elected in Kinki PR block)	73,378	38.1	▲4.9
JCP	Takashi Hirayama	26,929	14.0	▲3.8
Registered electors		375,445		
Turnout			54.85	▲3.92
Ishin hold				

=== 2024 ===
2024
Party	Candidate	Votes	%	±%
Ishin	Yasuto Urano	77,584	41.28	
LDP	Tomoaki Shimada (elected in Kinki PR block)	62,351	33.18	
CDP	Takeshi Matsuura	28,868	15.36	New
JCP	Manabu Nakagawa	19,133	10.18	
Majority		15,233	8.10	
Registered electors		380,258		
Turnout			50.93	▼4.85
Ishin hold				

=== 2021 ===
2021
Party	Candidate	Votes	%	±%
Ishin	Yasuto Urano	114,861	54.10	
LDP	Yōnosuke Kanō	67,887	31.97	
JCP	Kimihito Tame	29,570	13.93	
Majority		46,974	22.13	
Registered electors		390,415		
Turnout			55.78	▲7.70
Ishin gain from LDP				

=== 2017 ===
2017
Party	Candidate	Votes	%	±%
LDP	Naokazu Takemoto	81,968	43.82	
Ishin	Yasuto Urano (Won PR seat)	74,368	39.75	New
JCP	Kimihito Tame	30,733	16.43	
Majority		7,600	4.07	
Registered electors		399,851		
Turnout			48.08	
LDP hold				

=== 2014 ===
2014
Party	Candidate	Votes	%	±%
LDP	Naokazu Takemoto	86,297	45.04	
Innovation	Yasuto Urano (Won PR seat)	74,483	38.87	New
JCP	Kimihito Tame	30,840	16.09	
Majority		11,814	6.17	
Registered electors				
Turnout				
LDP gain from Innovation				

=== 2012 ===
2012
Party	Candidate	Votes	%	±%
Restoration	Yasuto Urano	91,830	41.17	New
LDP	Naokazu Takemoto (Won PR seat)	88,500	39.68	
Tomorrow	Kei Ohtani	21,616	9.69	New
JCP	Kimihito Tame	21,106	9.46	
Majority		3,330	1.49	
Registered electors				
Turnout				
Restoration gain from Tomorrow				

=== 2009 ===
2009
Party	Candidate	Votes	%	±%
Democratic	Kei Ohtani	123,651	46.78	
LDP	Naokazu Takemoto (Won PR seat)	107,896	40.82	
JCP	Yoshihiro Nakano	26,134	9.89	
Happiness Realization	Toshiki Murakami	6,654	2.52	New
Majority		15,755	5.96	
Registered electors				
Turnout				
Democratic gain from LDP				

=== 2005 ===
2005
Party	Candidate	Votes	%	±%
LDP	Naokazu Takemoto	144,663	55.79	
Democratic	Yuki Sakai	82,844	31.95	
JCP	Yoshihiro Nakano	31,810	12.27	
Majority		61,819	23.84	
Registered electors				
Turnout				
LDP hold				

=== 2003 ===
2003
Party	Candidate	Votes	%	±%
LDP	Naokazu Takemoto	107,323	49.68	
Democratic	Kikuo Umegawa	79,830	36.95	
JCP	Yoshihiro Nakano	28,874	13.37	
Majority		27,493	12.73	
Registered electors				
Turnout				
LDP hold				

=== 2000 ===
2000
Party	Candidate	Votes	%	±%
LDP	Naokazu Takemoto	100,028	46.73	
Democratic	Isao Aida	60,539	28.28	New
JCP	Yasutaka Kakinuma	44,898	20.97	
Liberal League	Shoji Yamaguchi	8,599	4.02	New
Majority		39,489	18.45	
Registered electors				
Turnout				
LDP hold				

=== 1996 ===
1996
Party	Candidate	Votes	%	±%
LDP	Naokazu Takemoto	81,602	39.56	New
New Frontier	Shūji Kitagawa	77,876	37.75	New
JCP	Isao Arikawa	46,805	22.69	New
Majority		3,726	1.81	
Registered electors				
Turnout				
LDP win (new seat)				
