= Nobuyuki Sekiyama =

Japanese politician (1934–2014)

- 関山 信之

Member of the House of Representatives
- In office 18 December 1983 – 27 September 1996
- Preceded by: Tōgo Yoneda
- Succeeded by: Constituency abolished
- Constituency: Niigata 1st

Personal details
- Born: 5 February 1934 Shinjuku, Tokyo, Japan
- Died: 18 August 2014 (aged 80) Higashi, Niigata, Japan
- Party: Socialist
- Other political affiliations: SDP (1996)

Nobuyuki Sekiyama (関山信之, Sekiyama Nobuyuki; 5 February 1934 – 18 August 2014) was a Japanese politician from the Democratic Party of Japan, he served for a total of four terms in the Japanese House of Representatives representing Niigata's 1st District from 1983 to 1996.
