= Naokazu Takemoto =

Japanese politician (born 1940)

- 竹本 直一
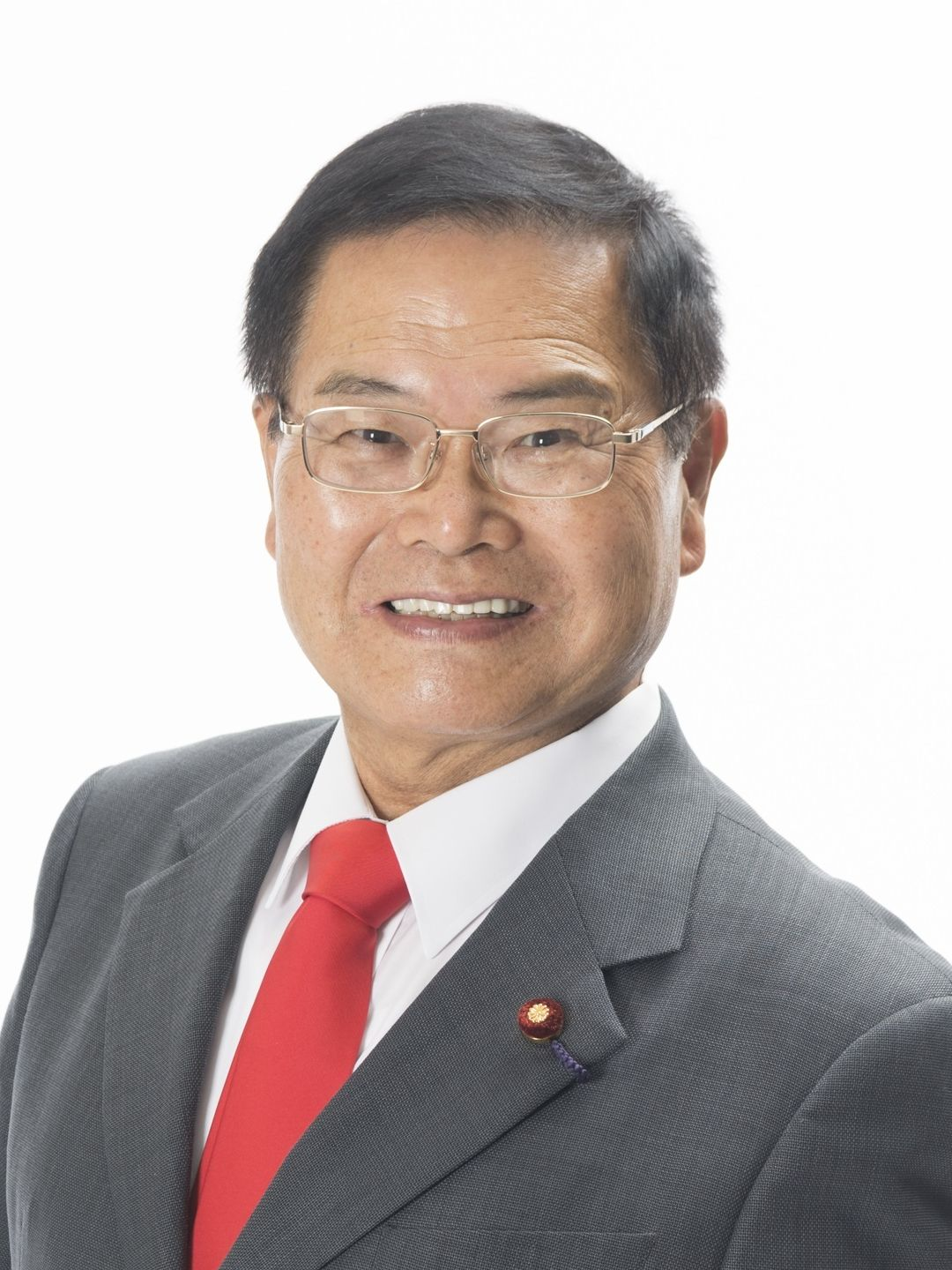
- Official portrait, 2019

Minister of State for Information Technology
- In office 11 September 2019 – 16 September 2020
- Prime Minister: Shinzo Abe
- Preceded by: Takuya Hirai
- Succeeded by: Takuya Hirai

Member of the House of Representatives
- In office 21 October 1996 – 14 October 2021
- Preceded by: Constituency established
- Succeeded by: Yasuto Urano
- Constituency: Osaka 15th (1996–2009); Kinki PR (2009–2014); Osaka 15th (2014–2021)

Personal details
- Born: 23 November 1940 (age 85) Kanan, Osaka, Japan
- Party: Liberal Democratic
- Education: University of Kyoto; University of California, Berkeley; Columbia University

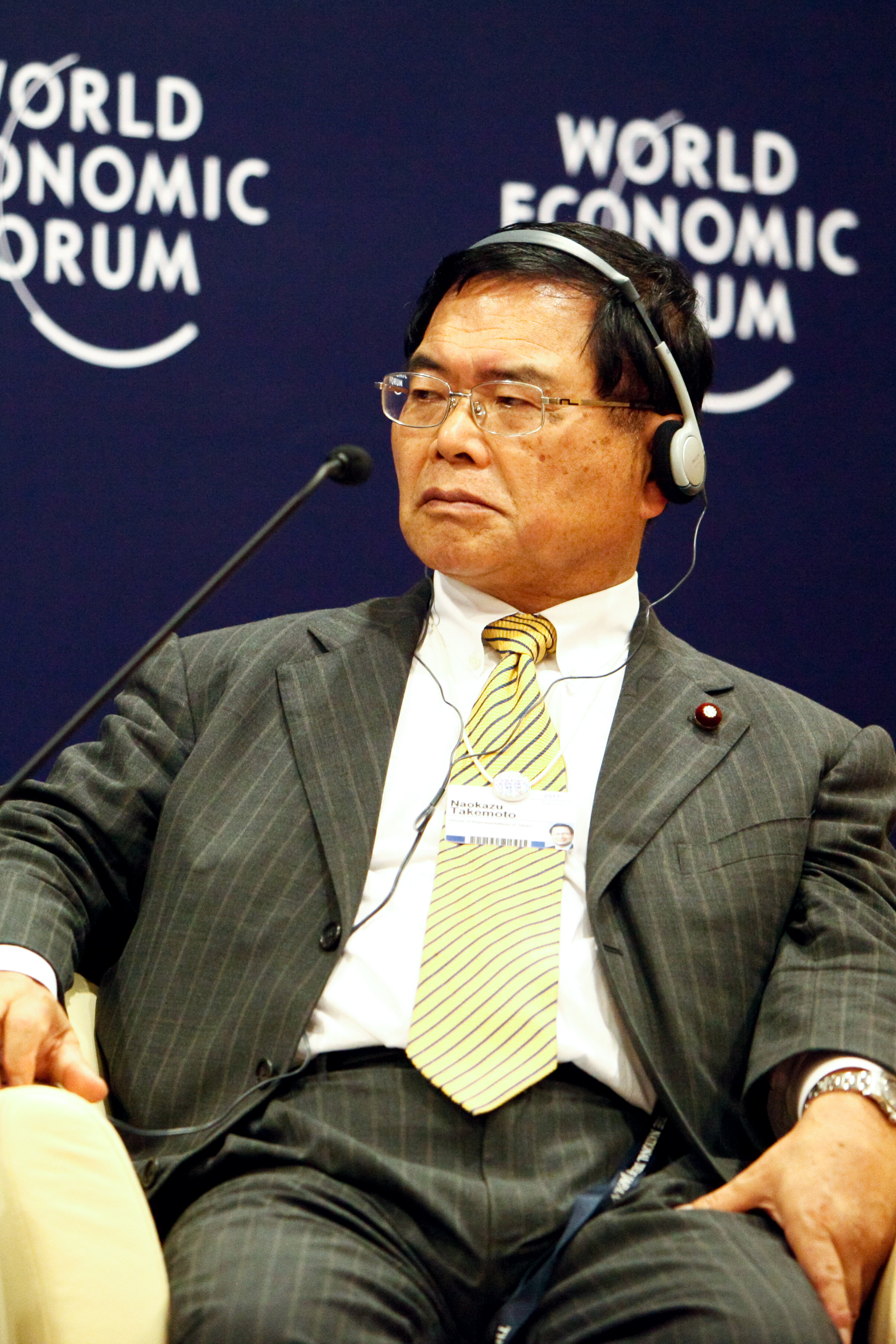
Takenaka at Jakarta in 2011

Naokazu Takemoto (竹本 直一, Takemoto Naokazu; born 23 November 1940) is a former Japanese politician who served in the House of Representatives in the Diet (national legislature) as a member of the Liberal Democratic Party.

== Career ==
A native of Minamikawachi District, Osaka and graduate of the University of Kyoto Faculty of Law and Graduate School of University of California at Berkeley, Takemoto was elected for the first time in 1996. He started his career as a civil servant in the former National Land Agency (now Ministry of Land, Infrastructure, Transport and Tourism). Since his election to the Diet he has also served as Parliamentary Secretary for Economy, Trade and Industry (Mori Cabinet), Parliamentary Secretary for Health, Labour and Welfare (Koizumi Cabinet), and Senior Vice-Minister of Finance (Koizumi Cabinet).

In June 2010, Takemoto became the Shadow Chairman of the National Public Safety Commission and Shadow Minister of Economic and Fiscal Policy in the Tanigaki Shadow Cabinet.

He became State Minister in charge of Science and Technology Policy on September 11, 2019.

== Positions ==
Affiliated to the openly revisionist lobby Nippon Kaigi, Takemoto is a member of the following right-wing groups in the Diet:

- Nippon Kaigi Diet discussion group (日本会議国会議員懇談会 - Nippon kaigi kokkai giin kondankai)
- Conference of parliamentarians on the Shinto Association of Spiritual Leadership (神道政治連盟国会議員懇談会 - Shinto Seiji Renmei Kokkai Giin Kondankai) - NB: SAS a.k.a. Sinseiren, Shinto Political League

Takemoto gave the following answers to the questionnaire submitted by Mainichi to parliamentarians in 2012:

- in favor of the revision of the Constitution
- in favor of the right of collective self-defense (revision of Article 9)
- against the reform of the National assembly (unicameral instead of bicameral)
- in favor of reactivating nuclear power plants
- against the goal of zero nuclear power by 2030s
- in favor of the relocation of Marine Corps Air Station Futenma (Okinawa)
- not applicable: evaluating the purchase of Senkaku Islands by the Government
- not applicable: a strong attitude versus China
- not applicable: the participation of Japan to the Trans-Pacific Partnership
- against a nuclear-armed Japan
- against the reform of the Imperial Household that would allow women to retain their Imperial status even after marriage
