= Hajime Ogawa =

Japanese politician (1939–2024)

- 小川 元

Member of the House of Representatives
- In office 18 July 1993 – 2 June 2000
- Preceded by: Hideo Kijima
- Succeeded by: Shigeyuki Goto
- Constituency: Nagano 3rd (1993–1996); Nagano 4th (1996–2000)
- In office 6 July 1986 – 24 January 1990
- Preceded by: Hyakurō Hayashi
- Succeeded by: Hideo Kijima
- Constituency: Nagano 3rd

Personal details
- Born: 1 January 1939 Fujimi, Nagano, Japan
- Died: 15 October 2024 (aged 85) Tokyo, Japan
- Party: Liberal Democratic
- Education: Gakushuin University
- Occupation: Businessman

Hajime Ogawa (Japanese: 小川元 Ogawa Hajime; 1 January 1939 – 15 October 2024) was a Japanese businessman and politician. A member of the Liberal Democratic Party, he served in the House of Representatives from 1986 to 1990 and again from 1993 to 2000.

Ogawa died in Tokyo on 15 October 2024, at the age of 85.
