= Tomoka Nakagawa (politician) =

Japanese politician (born 1947)

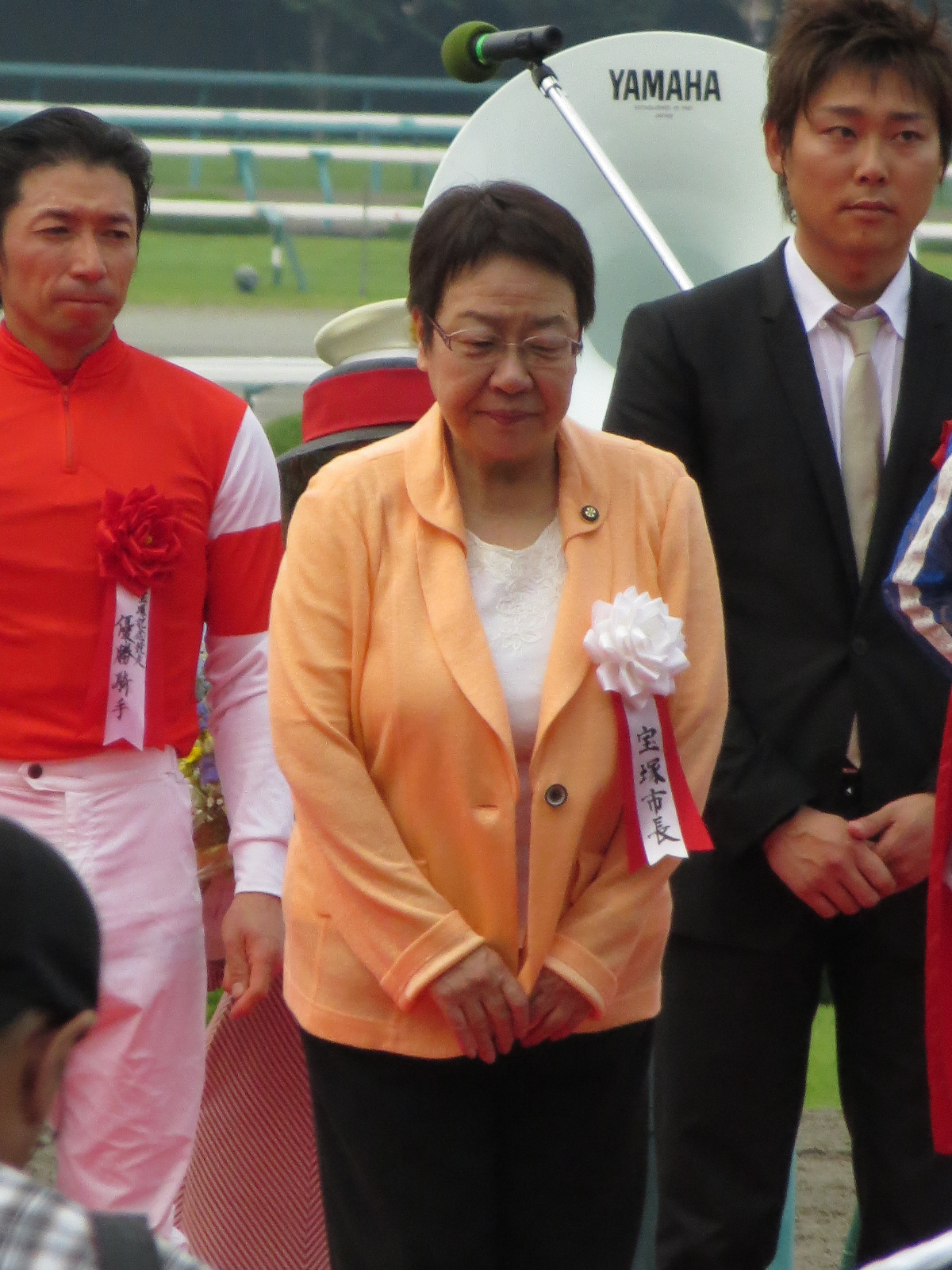
Tomoko Nakagawa in 2013

Tomoka Nakagawa (中川 智子, Nakagawa Tomoko) (born 28 September 1947 in Nachikatsuura) is a Japanese politician, representing the Japanese Social Democratic Party, in the House of Representatives of Japan, before becoming mayor of Takarazuka, the first woman to hold this position and the third woman to become mayor of Takarazuka.Hyōgo Prefecture.

== Life ==
She moved to Kaizuka, Osaka Prefecture, where she lived until her second year of high school. She was sensitive to the various forms of discrimination that exist in Japan, particularly against the children of foreign nationals. She became involved in demonstrations against discrimination and against the war in Vietnam.

She got an office job, but was fired because of the energy crisis. She then became a stay-at-home mother, and became involved in the associative and school life of her city. She also passed her diploma as a childcare worker.

After the 1995 Kobe earthquake, she met Takako Doi, president of the Japanese Social Democratic Party, where they both helped survivors.

Nakagawa ran in the 1996 Japanese parliamentary election, with the PSD. She then joined peace activist Kiyomi Tsujimoto and feminist lawyer Mizuho Fukushima, in the group of "Doi Children," independent women introduced to national politics by Doi. Nakagawa was elected, and entered the Diet of Japan. She used her mandate to facilitate the enactment of legislation to help victims of natural disasters.

She was re-elected in 2000, but lost her seat in 2003. She then announced her retirement from national politics.

After the arrest of the last two mayors of her city, Takarazuka, on corruption charges, Nakagawa decided to leave the PSD and run in the city's municipal elections in 2009 as an independent, which she won. She campaigned on her experience as a representative of Japan, but also on her condition as a woman, highlighting that no woman mayor had ever been arrested for corruption. Nakagawa was re-elected in 2013 and 2017, again as an independent, but with the support of the Democratic Party of Japan, the Social Democratic Party, and the Japanese Communist Party.

After three terms at the head of the city, she has announced her retirement, and personally approached, Harue Yamasaki, to take over from her. The latter was elected in 2021.
