= Mitsuo Higashinaka =

Japanese lawyer and politician

- 東中 光雄

Member of the House of Representatives
- In office 29 December 1969 – 2 June 2000
- Preceded by: Kan'ichi Kawakami
- Succeeded by: Multi-member district
- Constituency: Osaka 2nd (1969–1996); Kinki PR (1996–2000)

Personal details
- Born: 23 July 1924 Nara City, Nara, Japan
- Died: 7 August 2014 (aged 90) Miyakojima, Osaka, Japan
- Party: Communist
- Education: Doshisha University
- Occupation: Lawyer and politician

Mitsuo Higashinaka (東中光雄, Higashinaka Mitsuo; 23 July 1924 – 7 August 2014) was a Japanese lawyer and politician from the Japanese Communist Party, he served for a total of 10 terms in the House of Representatives from 1969 to 2000, representing Osaka's 2nd District.

In 2001, he resumed his legal career at the Kansai Joint Law Office, and in 2005, he served as head of the defense team in the Kurabo (Kurashiki Spinning) Human Rights Trial, and in 2009, he served as head of the defense team in the State Compensation Lawsuit for Special Benefits for the Wives of War Dead.
