= Democratic Party (Japan, 1996) =

Democratic Party of Japan 民主党 Minshutō
- President: Naoto Kan
- Chief Secretary: Yukio Hatoyama
- Founders: Naoto Kan; Yukio Hatoyama
- Founded: 29 September 1996
- Dissolved: 27 April 1998
- Split from: New Party Sakigake; Social Democratic Party of Japan
- Merged into: Democratic Party of Japan
- Ideology: Liberalism (Japanese)
- Political position: Centre to centre-left

The Democratic Party of Japan (民主党, Minshutō) was a centrist political party in Japan, and one of the forerunners to the Democratic Party of Japan formed in 1998. Its two leading members, Yukio Hatoyama and Naoto Kan, subsequently and sequentially became Prime Ministers at the end of the first decade of the 21st century.

== History ==
The party was founded on 29 September 1996 by sitting members of the Diet, and was composed mostly of former Sakigake and Japan Socialist Party politicians who did not support an alliance with the ruling Liberal Democratic Party. Its initial leaders were Yukio Hatoyama and Naoto Kan, formerly members of Sakigake. At its formation, it had 39 parliamentarians.

The party won 52 seats in the 1996 general election, becoming the second-largest opposition party after the New Frontier Party.

In April 1998, the party was augmented by former members of the New Frontier Party, which had collapsed in December 1997, increasing it to 90 seats. It then merged with the Good Governance Party (Minseitō), New Fraternity Party and Democratic Reform Party to create Democratic Party of Japan.

== Presidents of DPJ ==
No.	Name	Photo	Took office	Left office
Preceding party: New Party Sakigake & Social Democratic Party
1	Co-leadership: Naoto Kan & / Yukio Hatoyama		26 September 1996	16 September 1997
2	Naoto Kan		16 September 1997	27 April 1998
Successor party: Democratic Party (1998)

== Election results ==
=== House of Representatives ===
House of Representatives
Election	Leader	Constituency			Party list			Seats	Position	Status
Election	Leader	Votes	%	Seats	Votes	%	Seats	Seats	Position	Status
1996	Naoto Kan	6,001,666	10.62	17 / 300	8,949,190	16.10	35 / 200	52 / 500	3rd	Opposition
