= Takayoshi Taniguchi =

Japanese politician

- 谷口 隆義
- Official portrait, 2001

Member of the House of Representatives
- In office 19 July 1993 – 21 July 2009
- Preceded by: Yoshiyuki Asai
- Succeeded by: Tetsuo Inami
- Constituency: Osaka 2nd (1993–1996); Osaka 5th (1996–2009)

Personal details
- Born: 18 April 1949 (age 77) Osaka, Japan
- Party: Komeito
- Other political affiliations: CGP (1993–1994); NFP (1994–1998); LP (1998–2000)
- Education: Osaka Prefecture University; Kyoto University

Takayoshi Taniguchi (谷口 隆義, Taniguchi Takayoshi; born 18 April 1949) is a former Japanese politician who served in the House of Representatives in the Diet (national legislature) as a member of the New Komeito Party. A native of Osaka, Osaka and graduate of Osaka Prefecture University he was elected for the first time in 1993.
