= Kagoshima 1st district =

Legislative district of Japan

Kagoshima 1st District
- 鹿児島県第1区
- Parliamentary constituency for the Japanese House of Representatives
- Prefecture: Kagoshima
- Proportional District: Kyushu
- Electorate: 357,284 (as of September 2022)

Current constituency
- Created: 1994
- Seats: One
- Party: LDP
- Representative: Takuma Miyaji

Kagoshima 1st District (鹿児島県第1区, Kagoshima-ken dai-i-ku) is a single-member electoral district of the House of Representatives the lower house of the Diet of Japan. The district is in Kagoshima Prefecture and covers most of the prefectural capital the city of Kagoshima (a small part of the city is in the Kagoshima 2nd district) and includes Kagoshima District which covers several small islands south of Kyushu. In of 2021 the district had 358,559 eligible voters.

The district was created following the 1994 Japanese electoral reform. From the first elections in 1996 until 2009, the Representative was Okiharu Yasuoka who was first elected to the Diet in 1972 and was for a long time a Representative for an electoral district that covered the Amami Islands.

In the DPJ victory in the 2009 elections the district was won by democrat Hiroshi Kawauchi, but Yasuoka won the district back in 2012.

Yasuoka retired for health reasons in 2017 and his son Hirotake Yasuoka ran for his seat in 2017 but lost to Kawauchi. In 2021 Hirotake Yasuoka was put on a safe spot in the Kyushu proportional representation block, where he gained a seat in the Diet, and was replaced by Takuma Miyaji as the LDP candidate. Miyaji won the seat back in the 2021 election. Miyaji is the son of Kazuaki Miyaji, former Representative of the Kagoshima 3rd district and had first gained seat in the Diet in 2017 in the Kyushu PR block.

== List of representatives ==
Representative	Party	Dates	Notes
Okiharu Yasuoka	LDP	1996 – 2009	
Hiroshi Kawauchi	DPJ	2009 – 2012	
Okiharu Yasuoka	LDP	2012 – 2017	
Hiroshi Kawauchi	CDP	2017 – 2021	
Takuma Miyaji	LDP	2021 – 2024	
Hiroshi Kawauchi	CDP	2024 – 2026	
Takuma Miyaji	LDP	2026 –	

== Election results ==
2026
Party	Candidate	Votes	%	±%
LDP	Takuma Miyaji	92,321	51.0	▲6.5
Centrist Reform	Hiroshi Kawauchi	57,262	31.7	▼14.3
Sanseitō	Shunichi Makino (elected in Kyushu PR block)	27,071	15.0	▲5.5
JCP	Shinnosuke Koyama	4,228	2.3	
Registered electors		350,999		
Turnout			52.22	▲1,57
LDP gain from Centrist Reform				

2024
Party	Candidate	Votes	%	±%
CDP	Hiroshi Kawauchi	80,918	46.0	▼0.8
LDP	Takuma Miyaji (elected in Kyushu PR block)	78,221	44.5	▼8.7
Sanseitō	Takuma Nobori	16,607	9.4	
Registered electors		353,174		
Turnout			50.65	▼3.45
CDP gain from LDP				

2021
Party	Candidate	Votes	%	±%
LDP	Takuma Miyaji	101,251	53.2	▲12.4
CDP	Hiroshi Kawauchi	89,232	46.8	▲6.0
Turnout			54.10	▲2.33
LDP gain from CDP				

2017
Party	Candidate	Votes	%	±%
CDP	Hiroshi Kawauchi	76,699	41.8	▲10.8
LDP	Hirotake Yasuoka	74,831	40.8	▼3.4
Ishin	Tsuyoshi Yamano'uchi	26,895	14.7	▼5.0
Independent	Kasuhiro Miyazaki	5066	2.8	
Turnout			51.77	▲5.42
CDP gain from LDP				

2014
Party	Candidate	Votes	%	±%
LDP	Okiharu Yasuoka	67,376	44.1	▼1.4
Democratic	Hiroshi Kawauchi	47,315	31.0	▲5.6
Ishin	Tsuyoshi Yamano'uchi	30,133	19.7	▼1.8
JCP	Hironobu Yamaguchi	8024	5.2	▲1.7
Turnout			46.35	▼4.83
LDP hold				

2012
Party	Candidate	Votes	%	±%
LDP	Okiharu Yasuoka	76,652	45.5	▲2.8
Democratic	Hiroshi Kawauchi	42,792	25.4	▼27.8
Restoration	Tsuyoshi Yamano'uchi (won PR seat)	36,188	21,5	
Tomorrow	Shin'ichirō Watanabe	6,926	4.1	
JCP	Hironobu Yamaguchi	5,951	3.5	▲1.6
Turnout			51.18	▼15.70
LDP gain from Democratic				

2009
Party	Candidate	Votes	%	±%
Democratic	Hiroshi Kawauchi	117,383	53.2	▲12.2
LDP	Okiharu Yasuoka	94,226	42.7	▼10.8
JCP	Hironobu Yamaguchi	6,422	2.9	▼1.6
Independent	Jun'ichi Yamashita	1,429	0.6	
Happiness Realization	Jun'ichi Kawata	1079	0.5	
Turnout			66.88	▲2.66
Democratic gain from LDP				

2005
Party	Candidate	Votes	%	±%
LDP	Okiharu Yasuoka	112,437	53.5	▲1.5
Democratic	Hiroshi Kawauchi (won PR seat)	88,284	42.0	▼1.0
JCP	Michiko Katsurada	9,525	4.5	▼0.6
Turnout			64.22	▲7.11
LDP hold				

2003
Party	Candidate	Votes	%	±%
LDP	Okiharu Yasuoka	95,841	52.0	▲4.2
Democratic	Hiroshi Kawauchi (won PR seat)	79,243	43.0	▲0.1
JCP	Haruki Yamaguchi	9,359	5.1	▼4.1
Turnout			57.11	
LDP hold				
