= Fukuoka 10th district =

Legislative district of Japan

Fukuoka 10th District
- Parliamentary constituency for the Japanese House of Representatives
- Numbered map of Fukuoka Prefecture single-member districts
- Prefecture: Fukuoka
- Proportional District: Kyushu
- Electorate: 406,620

Current constituency
- Created: 1994
- Seats: One
- Party: LDP
- Representative: Haruka Yoshimura
- Municipalities: Moji-ku, Kokurakita-ku, and Kokuraminami-ku in Kitakyushu

Fukuoka 10th district (福岡県第10区, Fukuoka-ken dai-jukku or simply 福岡10区, Fukuoka-jukku) is a single-member constituency of the House of Representatives, the lower house of the national Diet of Japan.

== List of representatives ==
Election	Representative	Party	Notes
1996	Shozaburo Jimi	Liberal Democratic	
2000	Shozaburo Jimi	Liberal Democratic	
2003	Shozaburo Jimi	Liberal Democratic	
2005	Kyoko Nishikawa	Liberal Democratic	
2009	Takashi Kii	Democratic	
2012	Kozo Yamamoto	Liberal Democratic	
2014	Kozo Yamamoto	Liberal Democratic	
2017	Kozo Yamamoto	Liberal Democratic	
2021	Takashi Kii	CDP	
2024	Takashi Kii	CDP	
2026	Haruka Yoshimura	Liberal Democratic	

== Election results ==
2026
Party	Candidate	Votes	%	±%
LDP	Haruka Yoshimura (endorsed by Ishin)	86,338	42.5	▲13.36
Centrist Reform	Takashi Kii (Incumbent)	65,458	32.2	▼6.36
Independent	Oishi Jinto	29,370	14.5	▼5.86
Sanseitō	Kumamoto Kaname	14,315	7	New
JCP	Kunitoshi Koga	7,654	3.8	▼2.21
Registered electors		395,535		
Turnout		203,135	52	▲4.17
LDP gain from Centrist Reform				

2024
Party	Candidate	Votes	%	±%
CDP	Takashi Kii (Incumbent)	71,687	38.56	▼5.92
LDP	Haruka Yoshimura (endorsed by Komeito)	54,186	29.14	▼13.53
Independent	Oishi Jinto	37,858	20.36	New
JCP	Hiromasa Ōnishi	11,182	6.01	New
Innovation	Takashi Fukumoto	11,021	5.93	▼5.44
Registered electors		398,870		
Turnout		185,934	47.83	▼0.17
CDP hold				

2021
Party	Candidate	Votes	%	±%
CDP	Takashi Kii (Incumbent-Kyushu PR)	85,361	44.48	New
LDP	Kozo Yamamoto (Incumbent)	81,882	42.67	▼1.49
Innovation	Chikara Nishida	21,829	11.37	New
Independent	Hiromasa Ōnishi	2,840	1.48	New
Registered electors		408,059		
Turnout			48.00	▼1.64
CDP gain from LDP				

2017
Party	Candidate	Votes	%	±%
LDP	Kozo Yamamoto (Incumbent)	87,674	44.16	▼0.05
Kibō	Takashi Kii (elected by Kyushu PR)	80,073	40.33	New
JCP	Takaaki Tamura (Incumbent-Kyushu PR) (reelected by Kyushu PR)	30,792	15.51	▲1.45
Registered electors		413,429		
Turnout			49.64	▲2.94
LDP hold				

2014
Party	Candidate	Votes	%	±%
LDP	Kozo Yamamoto (Incumbent)	81,567	44.21	▲2.64
DPJ	Takashi Kii	58,599	31.76	▲5.60
JCP	Nahoko Takase	25,941	14.06	▲3.50
Independent	Masao Sato (Incumbent-Kyushu PR)	18,400	9.97	New
Registered electors		409,018		
Turnout			46.70	▼6.23
LDP hold				

2012
Party	Candidate	Votes	%	±%
LDP	Kozo Yamamoto (Incumbent-Kyushu PR)	87,460	41.57	▲0.11
DPJ	Takashi Kii (Incumbent)	55,040	26.16	▼21.90
YP	Masao Sato (elected by Kyushu PR)	45,698	21.72	New
JCP	Nahoko Takase	22,214	10.56	▲1.60
Turnout			52.82	
LDP gain from Democratic				

2009
Party	Candidate	Votes	%	±%
DPJ	Takashi Kii	123,312	48.06	▲24.26
LDP	Kyoko Nishikawa (Incumbent)	106,365	41.46	▲3.11
JCP	Kiyoshi Shinoda	22,980	8.96	▲0.67
HRP	Kenshin Kawakami	3,907	1.52	New
Turnout				
Democratic gain from LDP				

2005
Party	Candidate	Votes	%	±%
LDP	Kyoko Nishikawa (Incumbent-Kyushu PR)	97,748	38.35	▼6.85
Independent	Shozaburo Jimi (Incumbent)	65,129	25.55	New
DPJ	Takashi Kii (Incumbent-Kyushu PR)	60,662	23.80	▼15.38
JCP	Takaaki Tamura	21,140	8.29	▼7.33
SDP	Junichiro Kojima	10,191	4.00	▼12.52
Turnout				
LDP gain from Independent				

2003
Party	Candidate	Votes	%	±%
LDP	Shozaburo Jimi (Incumbent)	91,974	45.20	▲4.45
DPJ	Takashi Kii (elected by Kyushu PR)	79,735	39.18	▲17.16
JCP	Sohei Nihi	31,779	15.62	▼1.83
Turnout				
LDP hold				

2000
Party	Candidate	Votes	%	±%
LDP	Shozaburo Jimi (Incumbent)	88,446	40.75	▼3.15
DPJ	Naozumi Shimazu	47,792	22.02	New
JCP	Sohei Nihi	37,881	17.45	▲0.93
SDP	Yumi Morimoto	35,856	16.52	New
LL	Keiko Ochiai	7,046	3.25	▲1.04
Turnout				
LDP hold				

1996
Party	Candidate	Votes	%	±%
LDP	Shozaburo Jimi	95,967	43.90	New
NFP	Kazuo Hirotomo	81,678	37.37	New
JCP	Norio Kinoshita	36,118	16.52	New
LL	Hidetaka Nakajima	4,826	2.21	New
Turnout				

== See also ==
- List of districts of the House of Representatives of Japan
