= Kagoshima 3rd district =

Legislative district of Japan

Kagoshima 3rd District
- 鹿児島県第3区
- Parliamentary constituency for the Japanese House of Representatives
- Prefecture: Kagoshima
- Proportional District: Kyushu
- Electorate: 304,597 (2026)

Current constituency
- Created: 1994
- Seats: One
- Party: CRA
- Representative: Takeshi Noma

Kagoshima 3rd District (鹿児島県第3区, Kagoshima-ken dai-san-ku)is a single-member constituency of the House of Representatives in the Diet of Japan. It is located in Northern Kagoshima and consists of the cities of Akune, Izumi, Satsumasendai, Hioki, Ichikikushikino, Isa and Aira as well as the towns of Satsuma, Nagashima and Yūsui. In 2021 the district had 319,010 eligible voters.

Before the electoral reform of 1994, the area was split between the multi-member districts Kagoshima 1 that elected four Representatives by single non-transferable vote and Kagoshima 2 with three representatives.

After its creation, the new 3rd district was initially a solid "conservative kingdom", a safe seat for the Liberal Democratic Party. Its first representative Tadahiro Matsushita (Obuchi faction, pre-reform: 2nd district) was followed by Kazuaki Miyaji (Mitsuzuka faction, pre-reform: 1st district) in 2000. Matsushita became a representative for the Kyūshū proportional representation block. In the "postal Diet" of 2005, he was a postal privatization rebel and tried to retake Kagoshima 3rd district as an independent in the ensuing snap election but lost to Miyaji. After initially declaring his retirement from politics, Matsushita returned in 2009 as a candidate for the People's New Party with Democratic support and won the district against Miyaji. After Matsushita's suicide in 2012, Miyaji won the resulting by-election against government candidate Takeshi Noma. In the general House of Representatives election less than three months later, Miyaji lost the district to Noma.

After the 2017 electoral reapportionment, Kagoshima Prefecture lost one of its constituencies and much of the current 3rd district had previously belonged to the Kagoshima 4th district. Subsequently, the 2017 elections were won by Yasuhiro Ozato the previous Representative of the 4th district.

== List of representatives ==
Representative	Party	Dates	Notes
Tadahiro Matsushita	LDP	1996–2000	
Kazuaki Miyaji	LDP	2000–2009	Failed reelection in the Kyūshū PR block
Tadahiro Matsushita	PNP	2009–2012	Died in September 2012
Vacant (September–October 2012)
Kazuaki Miyaji	LDP	2012	Reelected in the Kyūshū PR block
Takeshi Noma	PNP	2012–2013	Left PNP in 2013
Takeshi Noma	Independent	2013–2017	
Yasuhiro Ozato	LDP	2017–2021	Reelected in the Kyūshū PR block
Takeshi Noma	CDP	2021–2026	
Takeshi Noma	CRA	2026–	

Numbered map of Kagoshima Prefecture single-member districts

== Election results ==
2026
Party	Candidate	Votes	%	±%
Centrist Reform	Takeshi Noma (incumbent)	88,518	50.8	▼7.5
LDP	Yasuhiro Ozato (won PR seat)	85,782	49.2	▲7.5
Turnout			58.93	▲0.78
Centrist Reform hold				

2024
Party	Candidate	Votes	%	±%
CDP	Takeshi Noma (incumbent)	102,762	58.26	▲4.39
LDP	Yasuhiro Ozato	73,630	41.74	▼4.39
Turnout		176,392	58.15	▼3.24
CDP hold				

2021
Party	Candidate	Votes	%	±%
CDP	Takeshi Noma	104,053	53.9	▲9.5
LDP	Yasuhiro Ozato (won PR seat)	89,110	46.1	▼4.3
Turnout			61.39	▼1.04
CDP gain from LDP				

2017
Party	Candidate	Votes	%	±%
LDP	Yasuhiro Ozato	102,501	50.4	
Kibō no Tō	Takeshi Noma	90,240	44.4	
JCP	Yūta Yamaguchi	10,605	5.2	
Turnout			62.43	▲4.86

2014 Japanese general election
Party	Candidate	Votes	%	±%
Independent	Takeshi Noma	79,003	54.6	
LDP	Kazuaki Miyaji (won PR seat)	56,741	39.2	
JCP	Yoko Yamaguchi	8,821	6.1	
Turnout		254,599	57.57	▼3.18
Independent gain from People's New				

2012
Party	Candidate	Votes	%	±%
People's New	Takeshi Noma	70,320	45.2	
LDP	Kazuaki Miyaji (won PR seat)	64,169	41.3	
Restoration	Hiroshi Fukudome	15,681	10.1	
JCP	Yumiko Ōkurano	4,098	2.6	
Happiness Realization	Isao Matsuzawa	1,210	0.8	
Turnout		258,665	60.75	▲4.15
People's New gain from LDP				

October 28, 2012 by-election
Party	Candidate	Votes	%	±%
LDP	Kazuaki Miyaji	70,694	48.90	
People's New	Takeshi Noma	65,025	44.98	
JCP	Yumiko Ōkurano	5,973	4.13	
Happiness Realization	Isao Matsuzawa	2,886	2.00	
Turnout		258,853	56.6	▼16.35
LDP gain from People's New				

2009
Party	Candidate	Votes	%	±%
People's New	Tadahiro Matsushita	107,285	56.5	
LDP	Kazuaki Miyaji	78,876	41.6	
Happiness Realization	Yoshimi Terasako	3,630	1.9	
Turnout		192,855	72.95	
People's New gain from LDP				

2005
Party	Candidate	Votes	%	±%
LDP	Kazuaki Miyaji	92,291	47.9	
Independent	Tadahiro Matsushita	68,808	35.7	
Democratic	Takeshi Noma	31,429	16.3	
Turnout		195,182	72.13	
LDP hold				

2003
Party	Candidate	Votes	%	±%
LDP	Kazuaki Miyaji	113,743	66.9	
Democratic	Shōji Ōzono	45,308	26.6	
JCP	Satoshi Murayama	11,042	6.5	
Turnout		174,412	64.14	
LDP hold				

2000
Party	Candidate	Votes	%	±%
LDP	Kazuaki Miyaji	127,315	72.1	
Democratic	Shōji Ōzono	33,590	19.0	
JCP	Satoshi Murayama	15,651	8.9	
LDP hold				

1996
Party	Candidate	Votes	%	±%
LDP	Tadahiro Matsushita	107,385	65.8	
New Frontier	Shin'ichirō Hirata	41,659	25.5	
JCP	Satoshi Murayama	14,151	8.7	
Turnout		168,729	62.7	
LDP win (new seat)				
