= Shozaburo Jimi =

Japanese politician

Shōzaburō Jimi
- 自見 庄三郎
- Official portrait, 2010

Minister of State for Financial Services
- In office 8 June 2010 – 4 June 2012
- Prime Minister: Naoto Kan; Yoshihiko Noda
- Preceded by: Shizuka Kamei
- Succeeded by: Tadahiro Matsushita

Minister of State for Postal Reform
- In office 8 June 2010 – 4 June 2012
- Prime Minister: Naoto Kan; Yoshihiko Noda
- Preceded by: Shizuka Kamei
- Succeeded by: Tadahiro Matsushita

Minister of Posts and Telecommunications
- In office 11 September 1997 – 30 July 1998
- Prime Minister: Ryūtarō Hashimoto
- Preceded by: Hisao Horinouchi
- Succeeded by: Seiko Noda

Member of the House of Councillors
- In office 29 July 2007 – 28 July 2013
- Constituency: National PR

Member of the House of Representatives
- In office 19 December 1983 – 8 August 2005
- Preceded by: Kiyoshi Kaji
- Succeeded by: Kyoko Nishikawa
- Constituency: Fukuoka 4th (1983–1996); Fukuoka 10th (1996–2005)

Personal details
- Born: 5 November 1945 (age 80) Kokura, Fukuoka, Japan
- Party: People's New Party (2006–2013)
- Other political affiliations: LDP (1983–2005); Independent (2005–2006)
- Children: Hanako Jimi
- Education: Kyushu University

Shozaburo Jimi (自見 庄三郎, Jimi Shōzaburō; born 5 November 1945) is a former Japanese politician of the now defunct People's New Party, and was a member of the House of Councillors in the Diet (national legislature).

== Early life ==
Jimi is a registered medical practitioner, and was a graduate of the department of medicine at Kyushu University in 1977.

== Political career ==
Jimi was elected to the House of Councillors in 2007, after serving more than 20 years in the House of Representatives of Japan for the 4th and 10th Fukuoka districts respectively.

He served as the Minister of State for Financial Services and Postal Reform from 2010 to 2012.

== Honours ==
- Grand Cordon of the Order of the Rising Sun (2016)

House of Representatives (Japan)
Preceded by MMC	Representative for Fukuoka 4th district (multi-member); 1983–1996; Served alongside: Kōzō Yamamoto, Kazuo Hirotomo, Sekisuke Nakanishi, others	Constituency abolished
New title New constituency	Representative for Fukuoka 10th district 1996–2005	Succeeded by Kyōko Nishikawa
Preceded by Ichirō Takahashi	Chair, Committee on Communications of the House of Representatives; 1995	Succeeded by Shōichi Nakagawa
House of Councillors
Preceded by N/A	Councillor by proportional representation 2007–2013	Succeeded by N/A
Political offices
Preceded by Hisao Horinouchi	Minister of Posts and Telecommunications; 1997–1998	Succeeded by Seiko Noda
Preceded by Shizuka Kamei	Minister of State for Financial Services; Minister of State for Postal Reform; 2010–2012	Succeeded by Tadahiro Matsushita
Party political offices
Preceded by Fumiko Konya	Chair, Policy Research Council of the People's New Party (Kokumin Shintō); 2009	Succeeded by Mikio Shimoji
Preceded by Hisaoki Kamei	Secretary General of the People's New Party; 2009–2010	Succeeded by Mikio Shimoji
Preceded by Shizuka Kamei	President of the People's New Party; 2012–2013	Party dissolved
