= Hiroshi Kawauchi =

Japanese politician

- 川内 博史
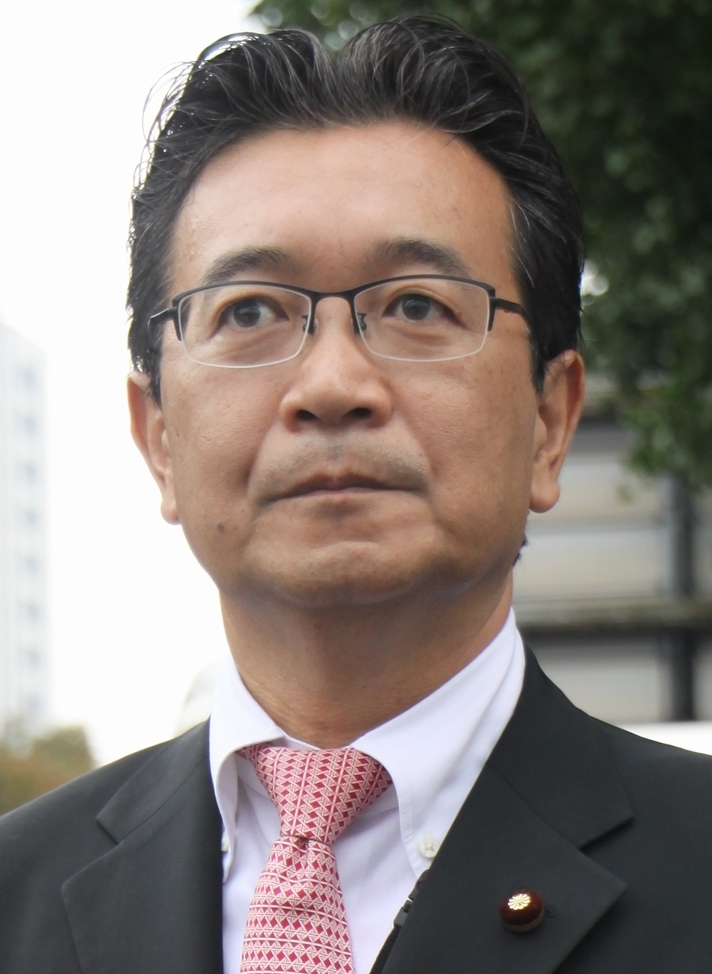
- Kawauchi in 2011

Member of the House of Representatives
- In office 25 April 2024 – 23 January 2026
- Preceded by: Katsuhiko Yamada
- Succeeded by: Takuma Miyaji
- Constituency: Kagoshima 1st
- In office 23 October 2017 – 14 October 2021
- Preceded by: Okiharu Yasuoka
- Succeeded by: Takuma Miyaji
- Constituency: Kagoshima 1st
- In office 21 October 1996 – 16 November 2012
- Preceded by: Constituency established
- Succeeded by: Okiharu Yasuoka
- Constituency: Kyushu PR (1996–2009); Kagoshima 1st (2009–2012)

Personal details
- Born: 2 November 1961 (age 65) Kagoshima, Japan
- Party: CRA (since 2026)
- Other political affiliations: JNP (1993); NPS (1993–1996); DP 1996 (1996–1998); DPJ (1998–2016); DP 2016 (2016–2017); CDP (2017–2026)
- Education: Waseda University
- Website: Official website

Hiroshi Kawauchi (川内 博史, Kawauchi Hiroshi; born 2 November 1961) is a Japanese politician of the Constitutional Democratic Party of Japan who served as a member of the House of Representatives in the Diet (national legislature). He studied at Waseda University.
