= Takeshi Noma =

Japanese politician

- 野間 健
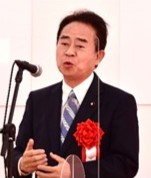

Member of the House of Representatives
- Incumbent
- Assumed office 3 November 2021
- Preceded by: Yasuhiro Ozato
- Constituency: Kagoshima 3rd
- In office 18 December 2012 – 28 September 2017
- Preceded by: Kazuaki Miyaji
- Succeeded by: Yasuhiro Ozato
- Constituency: Kagoshima 3rd

Personal details
- Born: 8 October 1958 (age 68) Setagaya, Tokyo, Japan
- Party: DRP (since 2026)
- Other political affiliations: JRP (1993–1994); Independent (1994–2005; 2013–2017); DPJ (2005–2009); PNP (2009–2013); KnT (2017–2018); DPP (2018–2020); CDP (2020–2026); CRA (2026)

Takeshi Noma (野間 健, Noma Takeshi; born 8 October 1958) is a Japanese politician of the Constitutional Democratic Party serving in the House of Representatives. Noma was a member of the People's New Party before the party dissolved.
