= Fukuoka 11th district =

Legislative district of Japan

Fukuoka 11th District
- Parliamentary constituency for the Japanese House of Representatives
- Numbered map of Fukuoka Prefecture single-member districts
- Prefecture: Fukuoka
- Proportional District: Kyushu
- Electorate: 255,347

Current constituency
- Created: 1994
- Seats: One
- Party: LDP
- Representative: Ryota Takeda
- Municipalities: Tagawa, Yukuhashi, Buzen, Tagawa District, Miyako District, and Chikujō District

Fukuoka 11th district (福岡県第11区, Fukuoka-ken dai-ju-ikku or simply 福岡11区, Fukuoka-ju-ikku) is a single-member constituency of the House of Representatives, the lower house of the national Diet of Japan.

== List of representatives ==
Election	Representative	Party	Notes
1996	Kozo Yamamoto	New Frontier	
2000	Kozo Yamamoto	Independent	
2003	Ryota Takeda	Independent	
2005	Ryota Takeda	Independent	
2009	Ryota Takeda	LDP	
2012	Ryota Takeda	LDP	
2014	Ryota Takeda	LDP	
2017	Ryota Takeda	LDP	
2021	Ryota Takeda	LDP	
2024	Tomonobu Murakami	Ishin	
2026	Ryota Takeda	LDP	

== Election results ==
2026
Party	Candidate	Votes	%	±%
LDP	Ryota Takeda	62,419	44.7	▲1.40
Ishin	Tomonobu Murakami (incumbent) (elected in Kyushu PR block)	43,002	30.8	▼14.2
Centrist Reform	Tomoyuki Tsuji	19,011	13.6	
Sanseitō	Naoki Inoue	10,070	7.2	
Social Democratic	Reiko Shiki	5,187	3.7	▼8.00
Majority		19,417	13.9	▲12.2
Registered electors		244,147		
Turnout		139,689	58.20	▲3.76
LDP gain from Ishin				

2024
Party	Candidate	Votes	%	±%
Ishin	Tomonobu Murakami	58,842	45.00	New
LDP	Ryota Takeda (incumbent)	56,607	43.30	▼12.46
Social Democratic	Reiko Shiki	15,297	11.70	▼2.47
Majority		2,235	1.70	
Registered electors		248,071		
Turnout			54.44	▲0.16
Ishin gain from LDP				

2021
Party	Candidate	Votes	%	±%
LDP	Ryota Takeda (Incumbent)	75,997	55.76	▲0.30
Independent	Tomonobu Murakami	40,996	30.08	New
SDP	Reiko Shiki	19,310	14.17	▼1.43
Registered electors		256,676		
Turnout			54.28	▼2.38
LDP hold				

2017
Party	Candidate	Votes	%	±%
LDP	Ryota Takeda (Incumbent)	81,129	55.46	▼10.14
Kibō	Tomonobu Murakami	42,335	28.94	New
SDP	Nobuaki Takeuchi	22,822	15.60	▼2.92
Registered electors		265,726		
Turnout			56.66	▲5.19
LDP hold				

2014
Party	Candidate	Votes	%	±%
LDP	Ryota Takeda (Incumbent)	85,488	65.60	▲9.73
SDP	Hiroyuki Fujinaka	24,138	18.52	▲6.42
JCP	Tomiko Yamashita	20,694	15.88	▲8.47
Registered electors		265,720		
Turnout			51.47	▼7.92
LDP hold				

2012
Party	Candidate	Votes	%	±%
LDP	Ryota Takeda (Incumbent)	86,443	55.87	▼1.56
JRP	Daisuke Hori	38,091	24.62	New
SDP	Ayako Tanise	18,715	12.10	▼20.95
JCP	Tomiko Yamashita	11,469	7.41	▼0.41
Turnout			59.39	
LDP hold				

2009
Party	Candidate	Votes	%	±%
LDP	Ryota Takeda (Incumbent)	106,334	57.43	▲18.15
SDP	Haruna Yamaguchi	61,192	33.05	▲13.90
JCP	Tomiko Yamashita	14,475	7.82	▲2.77
HRP	Hidenori Kosako	3,142	1.70	New
Turnout				
LDP hold				

2005
Party	Candidate	Votes	%	±%
Independent	Ryota Takeda (Incumbent)	78,757	39.50	▼2.93
LDP	Kozo Yamamoto (elected by Kyushu PR)	78,308	39.28	▲5.59
DPJ	Shūji Inatomi	32,231	16.17	New
JCP	Katsuji Murakami	10,075	5.05	▲0.32
Turnout				
Independent hold				

2003
Party	Candidate	Votes	%	±%
Independent	Ryota Takeda	78,882	42.43	New
LDP	Kozo Yamamoto (Incumbent)	62,628	33.69	▼1.19
SDP	Hideaki Tejima	35,591	19.15	▼2.65
JCP	Katsuji Murakami	8,790	4.73	▼1.42
Turnout				
Independent gain from LDP				

2000
Party	Candidate	Votes	%	±%
Independent	Kozo Yamamoto (Incumbent)	68,440	36.26	New
LDP	Ryota Takeda	65,838	34.88	▲10.55
SDP	Sekisuke Nakanishi (elected by Kyushu PR)	41,152	21.80	▼7.96
JCP	Fukuyo Yanatake	11,608	6.15	▼1.20
LL	Kōki Ito	1,698	0.90	New
Turnout				
Independent hold				

1996
Party	Candidate	Votes	%	±%
NFP	Kozo Yamamoto	66,798	38.55	New
SDP	Sekisuke Nakanishi (elected by Kyushu PR)	51,569	29.76	New
LDP	Ryota Takeda	42,152	24.33	New
JCP	Tadao Inamoto	12,741	7.35	New
Turnout				

== See also ==
- List of districts of the House of Representatives of Japan
