= Takashi Kii =

Japanese politician (born 1973)

- 城井 崇
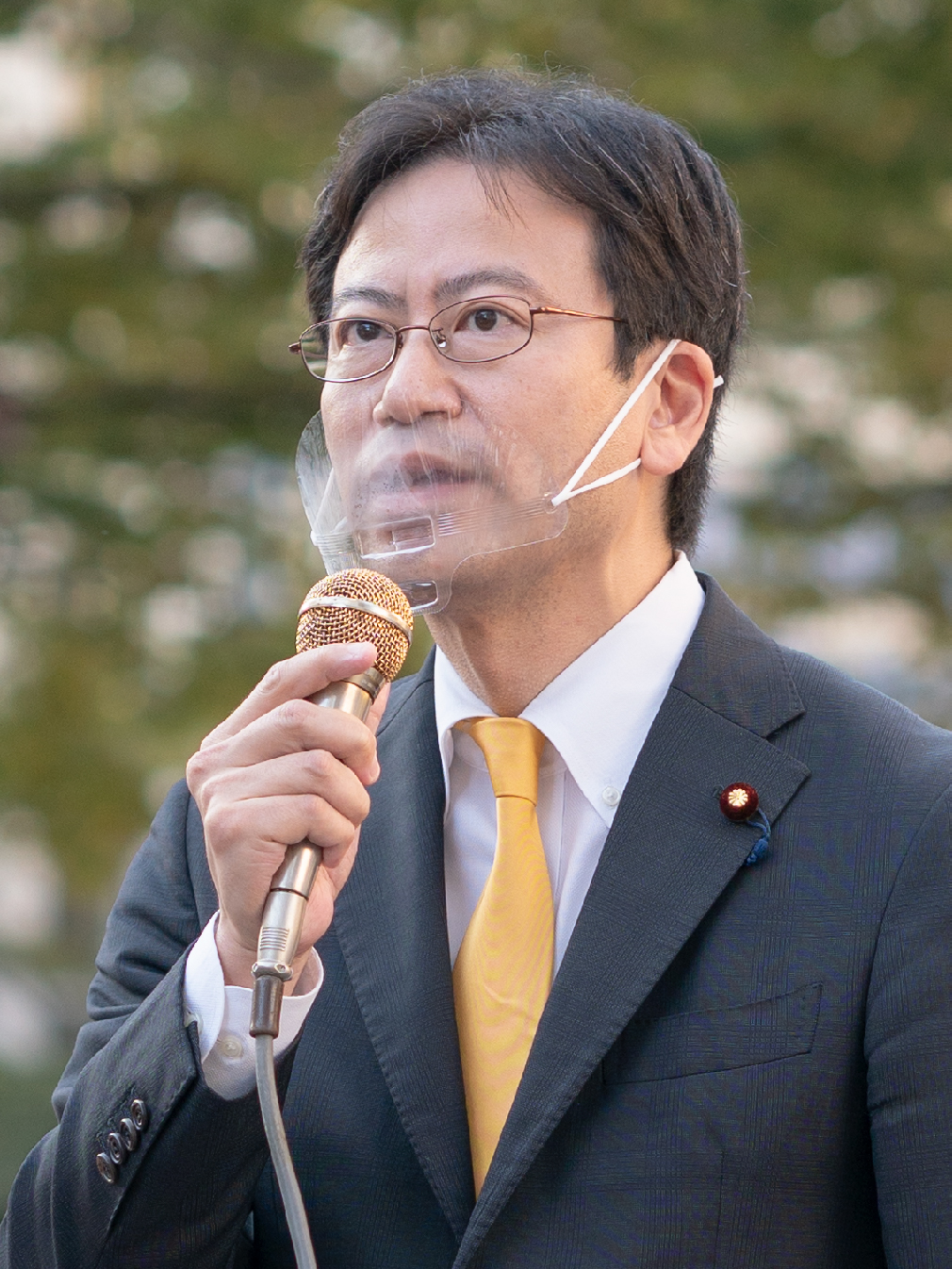
- Kii in 2020

Member of the House of Representatives
- In office 1 November 2017 – 23 January 2026
- Preceded by: Multi-member district
- Succeeded by: Haruka Yoshimura
- Constituency: Kyushu PR (2017–2021); Fukuoka 10th (2021–2026)
- In office 11 September 2009 – 16 November 2012
- Preceded by: Kyoko Nishikawa
- Succeeded by: Kozo Yamamoto
- Constituency: Fukuoka 10th
- In office 10 November 2003 – 8 August 2005
- Preceded by: Multi-member district
- Succeeded by: Multi-member district
- Constituency: Kyushu PR

Personal details
- Born: 23 June 1973 (age 53) Moji, Kitakyushu, Japan
- Party: CRA (since 2026)
- Other political affiliations: DPJ (2003–2016); DP (2016–2017); KnT (2017–2018); DPP (2018–2020); CDP (2020–2026)
- Education: Kyoto University

Takashi Kii (城井崇, Kii Takashi; born 23 June 1973) is a Japanese politician who served as a member of the House of Representatives from 2017 to 2026, having previously served from 2003 to 2005 and from 2009 to 2012. From 2011 to 2012, he served as parliamentary vice-minister of education, culture, sports, science and technology.
