= Ryota Takeda =

Japanese politician

- 武田良太
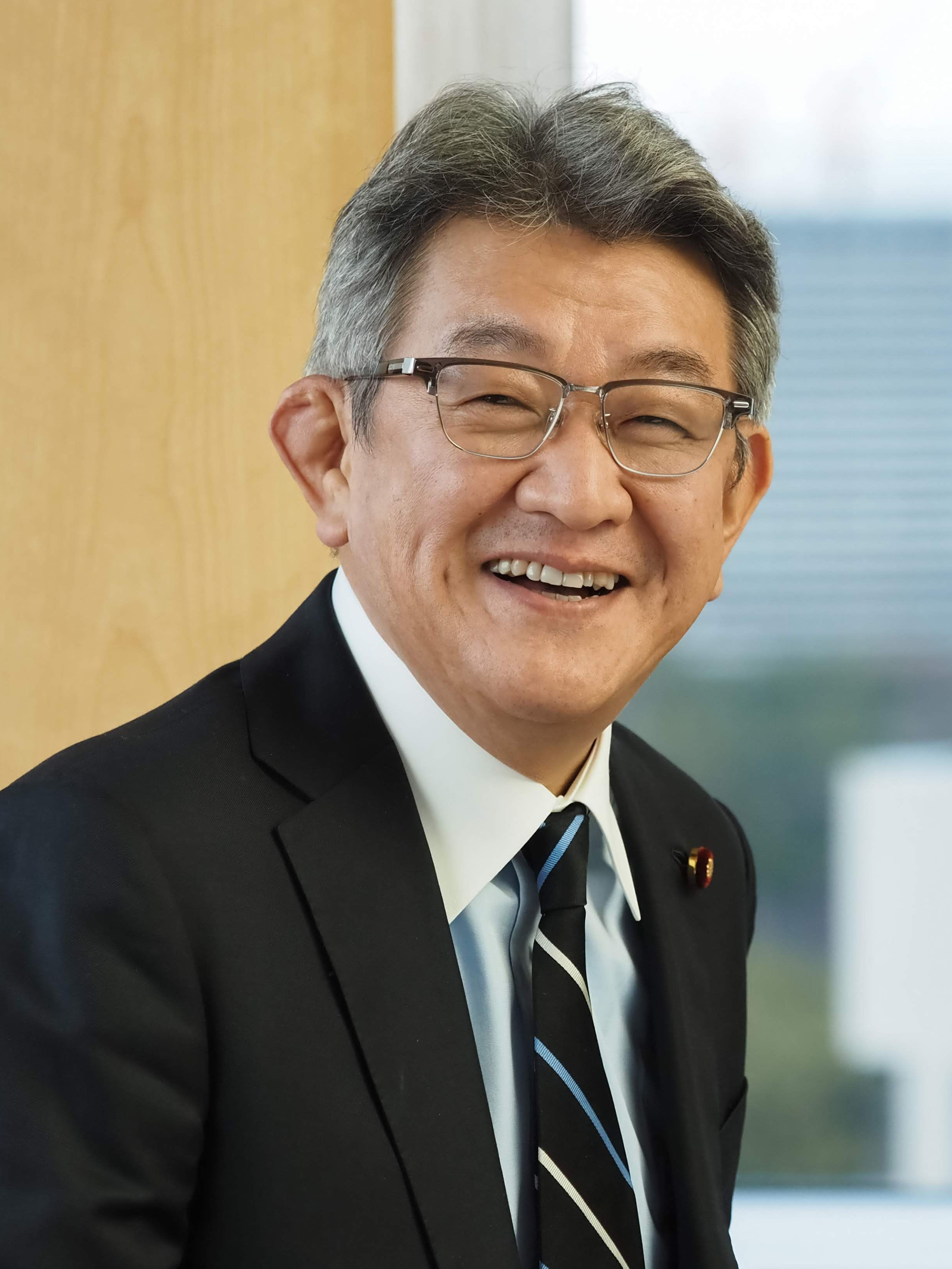
- Official portrait, 2019

Minister for Internal Affairs and Communications
- In office 16 September 2020 – 4 October 2021
- Prime Minister: Yoshihide Suga
- Preceded by: Sanae Takaichi
- Succeeded by: Yasushi Kaneko

Chairman of the National Public Safety Commission
- In office 11 September 2019 – 16 September 2020
- Prime Minister: Shinzo Abe
- Preceded by: Junzo Yamamoto
- Succeeded by: Hachiro Okonogi

Member of the House of Representatives
- Incumbent
- Assumed office 9 February 2026
- Preceded by: Tomonobu Murakami
- Constituency: Fukuoka 11th
- In office 9 November 2003 – 9 October 2024
- Preceded by: Kozo Yamamoto
- Succeeded by: Tomonobu Murakami
- Constituency: Fukuoka 11th

Personal details
- Born: 1 April 1968 (age 58) Fukuchi, Fukuoka, Japan
- Party: Liberal Democratic
- Relatives: Rokusuke Tanaka (uncle)
- Education: Waseda University
- Website: Official website

Ryota Takeda (武田 良太, Takeda Ryōta; born 1 April 1968) is a Japanese politician who served as the Minister of Internal Affairs and Communications from September 2020 to October 2021. A member of the Liberal Democratic Party, he previously served as the Minister in Charge of Public Safety, Measures for National Land Strengthening and Disaster Management.

== Early life ==
Takeda was born in Akaike in Tagawa District, Fukuoka (now part of Fukuchi, Fukuoka). His uncle, Rokusuke Tanaka, was a member of the House of Representatives.

Takeda graduated from Waseda University with a degree in English literature.

== Political career ==
Before starting his political career, Takeda worked as an aide to Shizuka Kamei.

In 1993 Japanese general election, he ran for a seat in the House of Representatives for the Fukuoka 4th district to replace his father, but was defeated. In 1996 Japanese general election, he ran again for the Fukuoka 11th district, but was defeated again. In 2000 Japanese general election, he ran again for the same district, but came in second place. In 2003 Japanese general election, on his fourth attempt, he finally won the seat.

Takeda then served as acting director of the LDP National Defense Division, deputy director of the LDP Agriculture and Forestry Division, Parliamentary Secretary for Defense under Prime Ministers Yasuo Fukuda and Taro Aso, Director of the LDP Public Speeches Division, and Chairman of the Security Committee for the House of Representatives.

In September 2019, Prime Minister Shinzo Abe appointed Takeda as the Chairman of the National Public Safety Commission, and minister in charge of administrative reform, civil service reform, building national resilience, and disaster management. Takeda was subject to a no confidence motion in 2019 after proposing legislation that would allow the cabinet to extend the term of senior prosecutors, amid controversy over the deferred retirement of a top Tokyo prosecutor Hiromu Kurokawa.

He was appointed to head the Ministry of Internal Affairs and Communications in September 2020, under newly elected Prime Minister Yoshihide Suga. One of his initial priorities in this role was lowering mobile phone rates in Japan.

== Political views ==
Takeda is affiliated with the nationalist organization Nippon Kaigi.

Political offices
Preceded by Sanae Takaichi	Minister for Internal Affairs and Communications; 2020–2021	Succeeded by Yasushi Kaneko
