= Haruka Yoshimura (disambiguation) =

Haruka Yoshimura is a Japanese voice actress.

Haruka Yoshimura may refer to:

- Haruka Yoshimura (politician), member of the Fukuoka Prefectural Assembly
- Haruka Yoshimura, a Japanese wrestler; see Makoto (wrestler) and Ray (wrestler)
