= Tadahiro Matsushita =

Japanese politician (1939–2012)

- 松下 忠洋
- Official portrait, 2009

Member of the House of Representatives
- In office 31 August 2009 – 10 September 2012
- Preceded by: Kazuaki Miyaji
- Succeeded by: Kazuaki Miyaji
- Constituency: Kagoshima 3rd
- In office 19 July 1993 – 8 August 2005
- Preceded by: Shin'ichirō Hirata
- Succeeded by: Multi-member district
- Constituency: Kagoshima 2nd (1993–1996); Kagoshima 3rd (1996–2000); Kyushu PR (2000–2005)

Personal details
- Born: 9 February 1939 Satsumasendai, Kagoshima, Japan
- Died: 10 September 2012 (aged 73) Koto, Tokyo, Japan
- Party: People's New Party (2007–2012)
- Other political affiliations: LDP (1993–2005); Independent (2005–2007)
- Education: Kyoto University
- Website: http://matsushita-tadahiro.jp/

Tadahiro Matsushita (松下 忠洋, Matsushita Tadahiro; 9 February 1939 – 10 September 2012) was a Japanese politician and five-time member of the House of Representatives of Japan. He served in government from 1962 when he joined the Ministry of Construction to 2012. At the time of his death, he was the Minister of State for Financial Services.

He was first elected to the House of Representatives in 1993, and was re-elected to four consecutive terms. However, when he failed to support postal privatization, the leaders of his party, the Liberal Democratic Party, refused to support his 2005 campaign. As a result, he dropped out of the race. He returned to run again in 2009, this time as a member of a smaller group, the recently founded People's New Party. He won his election, and for the rest of his life was one of only three members of his party to hold a seat in the House.

== Early life and education ==
Matsushita was born on 9 February 1939 in Satsumasendai, Kagoshima. He graduated from the Faculty of Agriculture at Kyoto University in March 1962.

== Political career ==
Matsushita first held a post within the Japanese government in April 1962 when he joined the Ministry of Construction. In June 1970, he seconded with the Ministry of Foreign Affairs. He officially left the Ministry of Construction in June 1992. In 2001, he was appointed Senior Vice Minister of the Cabinet Office, House Committee on Cabinet in 2004. He was the Senior Vice-Minister of Economy, Trade and Industry.

He was the first representative from the Yukio Hatoyama to visit Indonesia, where he guaranteed aid to the country in the wake of the 2009 Sumatra earthquakes. During the 2010 World Future Energy Summit, Matsushita once again represented the Japanese government internationally. He was appointed Minister of Financial Services in June 2012.

=== House of Representatives ===
Matsushita was first elected to the House of Representatives of Japan in July 1993, and was subsequently elected in October 1996, June 2000, November 2003, and 2009. In the House, he served on directed numerous committees, including the Committee on Agriculture, Forestry and Fisheries, Special Committee on Disasters, Committee on Rules and Administration, and Special Committee on Okinawa and Northern Problems. He was also Parliamentary Secretary of the Ministry of Agriculture, Forestry and Fisheries.

Matsushita was a member of the Liberal Democratic Party for four of his five terms. However, during the 2005 elections, he faced opposition from his party after he failed to support postal privatization. He returned to run in 2009, having left his party for the People's New Party. He was a junior member of the party, and one of only four members elected to the House.

== Death ==
Matsushita was found dead in his residence in Tokyo on 10 September 2012. Police stated that he appeared to have committed suicide by hanging himself.

Political offices
Preceded by Shōzaburō Jimi	Minister of State for Postal Reform; Minister of State for Financial Services; June–September 2012	Succeeded by TBD
Preceded by Katsuyuki Ishida; Hitoshi Gotō; Ikkō Nakatsuka	Senior Vice Minister for Reconstruction; Senior Vice Minister of Cabinet Office; February–June 2012; Served alongside: Katsuyuki Ishida, Hitoshi Gotō, Ikkō Nakatsuka, Yoshinori Suematsu	Succeeded by Katsuyuki Ishida; Hitoshi Gotō; Ikkō Nakatsuka; Yoshinori Suematsu; Izumi Yoshida
Preceded by Sanae Takaichi; Takamori Yoshikawa	Senior Vice Minister of Economy, Trade and Industry; 2009–2012; Served alongside: Teruhiko Mashiko, Motohisa Ikeda, Seishū Makino	Succeeded by Mitsuyoshi Yanagisawa; Seishū Makino
Preceded by Takanori Sakai; Seiji Nakamura; Jin Murai	Senior Vice Minister of Cabinet Office; 2001–2002; Served alongside: Seiji Nakamura, Yoshitaka Murata, Akihiko Kumashiro	Succeeded by Tatsuya Itō; Takumi Nemoto; Kenzō Yoneda
House of Representatives (Japan)
Preceded by Kazuaki Miyaji	Representative for Kagoshima 3rd district 2009–2012	Vacant
Preceded by N/A	Representative for the Kyūshū proportional representation block 2000–2005	Succeeded by N/A
New district	Representative for Kagoshima 3rd district 1996–2000	Succeeded by Kazuaki Miyaji
Preceded by Kiichi Murayama; Sadatoshi Ozato; Shin'ichirō Hirata	Representative for Kagoshima 2nd district (multi-member); 1993–1996; Served alongside: Sadatoshi Ozato, Ken'ichi Hamada	District eliminated
