= Shizuka Kamei =

Japanese politician

- 亀井 静香
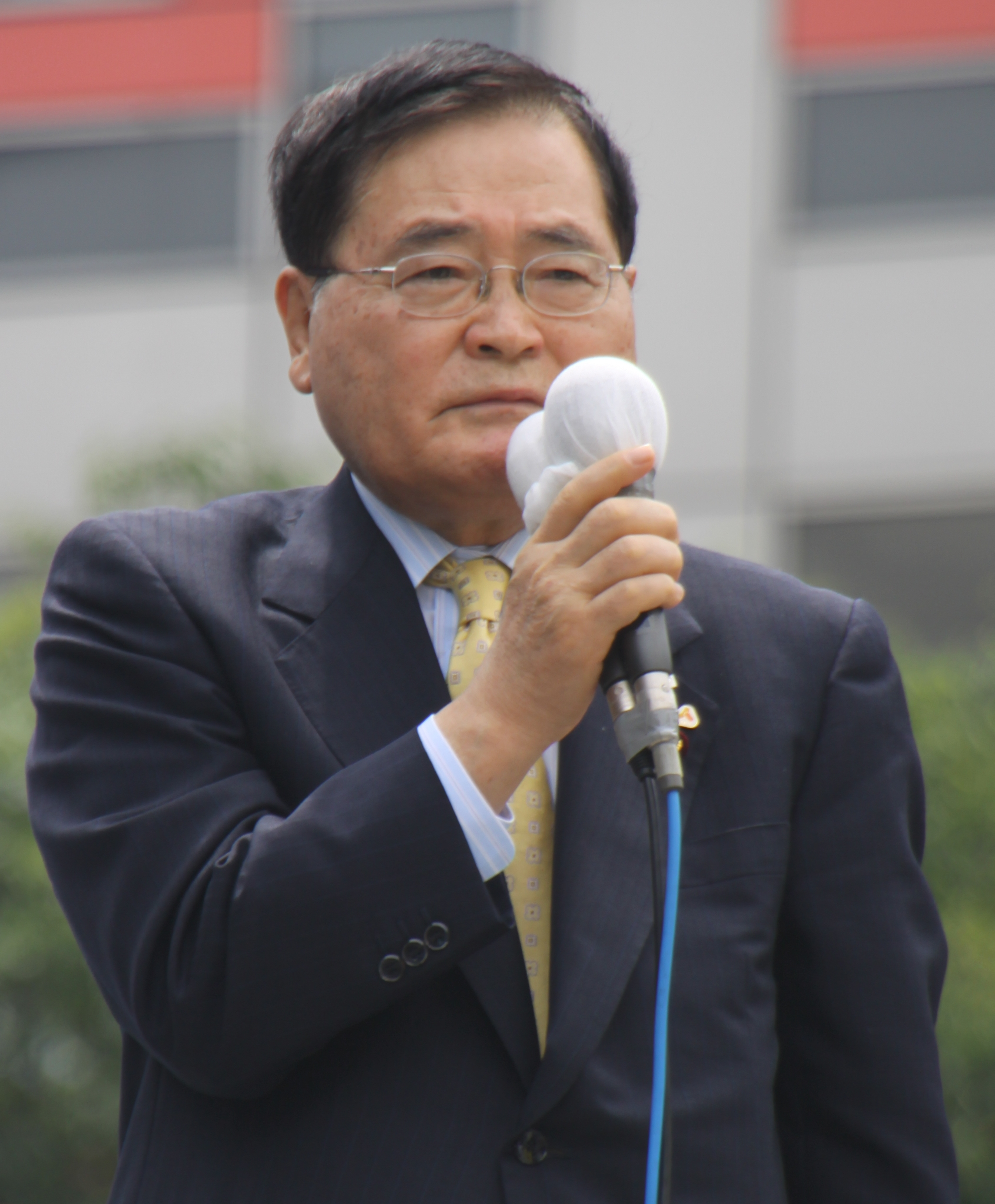
- Kamei in 2010

Minister of State for Financial Services
- In office 16 September 2009 – 11 June 2010
- Prime Minister: Yukio Hatoyama; Naoto Kan
- Preceded by: Kaoru Yosano
- Succeeded by: Shōzaburō Jimi

Minister of Construction
- In office 7 November 1996 – 11 September 1997
- Prime Minister: Ryutaro Hashimoto
- Preceded by: Eiichi Nakao
- Succeeded by: Tsutomu Kawara

Minister of Transport
- In office 30 June 1994 – 8 August 1995
- Prime Minister: Tomiichi Murayama
- Preceded by: Nobuaki Futami
- Succeeded by: Takeo Hiranuma

Member of the House of Representatives
- In office 8 October 1979 – 28 September 2017
- Preceded by: Yoshito Fukuoka
- Succeeded by: Koji Satō
- Constituency: Hiroshima 3rd (1979–1996); Hiroshima 6th (1996–2017)

Personal details
- Born: 1 November 1936 (age 89) Shōbara, Hiroshima, Japan
- Party: Independent
- Other political affiliations: LDP (1979–2005); PNP (2005–2012); TCJ (2012); TPJ (2012); Green Wind (2012–2013)
- Children: 5
- Relatives: Ikuo Kamei (brother)
- Education: University of Tokyo
- Website: www.kamei-shizuka.net/home.html

Shizuka Kamei (亀井 静香, Kamei Shizuka; born 1 November 1936) is a Japanese retired politician who served in the House of Representatives from 1979 to 2017. He was a faction leader in the Liberal Democratic Party, but left in opposition to Prime Minister Junichiro Koizumi in 2005 and founded the People's New Party.

He is a former chairman of the Parliamentary League for the Abolition of the Death Penalty.

== Early life ==
He was born in the city of Shōbara in Hiroshima Prefecture into a poor family. He studied at the department of economics at University of Tokyo and worked his way through school through various jobs, including singing at a cabaret.

Upon graduation in 1960, he entered Sumitomo Seika, and joined the National Police Agency in 1962. In 1972, he took charge of a number of high-profile cases, including the Red Army Asama-Sanso incident, the Narita Airport incident, and the Tel Aviv highjacking. Kamei is one of the few major politicians to oppose the death penalty, and wrote a book, Shikei Haishi ron, asserting his opposition.

== Political career ==
In 1977, he left the agency and received 3.5 million yen in severance pay, which he used to run for the Diet in Hiroshima. He was elected in 1979 as a member of the Liberal Democratic Party (LDP).

In 1989, he formed the Freedom Reform Alliance, criticizing the LDP's system of factions and strongly supported Shintarō Ishihara. He became Minister of Transport in 1994 and Minister of Construction in 1996. In 1998, he left the Mitsuzuka faction and formed the "Nakayama-Kamei group" with Minister of Foreign Affairs Taro Nakayama.

In 1999, he headed up the LDP's Policy Research Council and founded the Kamei faction. In 2003, he unsuccessfully ran for the position of Prime Minister against the incumbent, Junichiro Koizumi.

He opposed Koizumi's postal privatization plan and left the LDP in 2005, forming the Kokumin Shinto (People's New Party) with four other Diet members. Despite facing the popular businessman Takafumi Horie in the 2005 election, he won reelection for the tenth time.

On 16 September 2009, Kamei became the banking and postal services minister in the newly formed Hatoyama cabinet. Throughout the week, he voiced his commitment to providing economic stability for small companies, who he claimed "had lost vitality". He plans to provide a moratorium of up to three years on loan repayments and attempts to put a brake on what he perceives as excesses by financial and lending institutions.

Kamei decided not to run in the 2017 Japanese general election and therefore lost his seat in the House of Representatives.

=== Cultural references ===
He is sometimes humorously referred to as Shizuka-chan (where "chan" is a title usually reserved for young girls) after a female character in the manga Doraemon who shares his personal name.

The character "Takeo Tsuruta" in the manga Akumetsu is based on him.

=== Scandal ===
In August 2003, Kamei acknowledged receiving political donations from the leader of a group of loan sharks affiliated to the Yamaguchi-gumi, the largest known yakuza syndicate in Japan. The donor was Susumu Kajiyama.

== Personal life ==
Kamei is a six-level blackbelt in Aikido and enjoys golf and oil painting.

== Election history ==
Election	Age	District	Political party	Number of votes	election results
1979 Japanese general election	42	Hiroshima 3rd district	LDP	59,350	winning
1980 Japanese general election	43	Hiroshima 3rd district	LDP	86,562	winning
1983 Japanese general election	47	Hiroshima 3rd district	LDP	73,862	winning
1986 Japanese general election	49	Hiroshima 3rd district	LDP	116,514	winning
1990 Japanese general election	53	Hiroshima 3rd district	LDP	97,433	winning
1993 Japanese general election	56	Hiroshima 3rd district	LDP	91,064	winning
1996 Japanese general election	59	Hiroshima 6th district	LDP	122,071	winning
2000 Japanese general election	63	Hiroshima 6th district	LDP	138,790	winning
2003 Japanese general election	67	Hiroshima 6th district	LDP	117,659	winning
2005 Japanese general election	68	Hiroshima 6th district	PNP	110,979	winning
2009 Japanese general election	72	Hiroshima 6th district	PNP	137,287	winning
2012 Japanese general election	76	Hiroshima 6th district	TPJ	91,078	winning
2014 Japanese general election	78	Hiroshima 6th district	Independent	89,756	winning

== See also ==
- Capital punishment in Japan
- Nobuto Hosaka

Political offices
Preceded by Kaoru Yosano	Minister of State for Financial Services; 2009–2010	Succeeded by Shōzaburō Jimi
Preceded by Eiichi Nakao	Minister of Construction; 1996–1997	Succeeded by Tsutomu Kawara
Preceded by Nobuaki Futami	Minister of Transportation; 1994–1995	Succeeded by Takeo Hiranuma
House of Representatives (Japan)
New constituency	Representative for Hiroshima's 6th district 1996–2017	Succeeded by Koji Satō
Preceded by Kiichi Miyazawa; Masashi Furukawa; Kiyoshi Utsumi; Moriyoshi Satō; Yoshito Fukuoka	Representative for Hiroshima's 3rd district (multi-member); 1979–1996; Served alongside: Kiichi Miyazawa, Masashi Furukawa, Moriyoshi Satō, Masakatsu Okada, Yoshito Fukuoka, Minoru Yanagida, Tatsukuni Komori	District eliminated
Preceded by Motoji Kondo	Chair, House of Representatives Committee on Agriculture, Forestry and Fisheries; 1990–1991	Succeeded by Ichizo Ōhara
Party political offices
Preceded by Tamisuke Watanuki	President of the People's New Party; 2009–2012	Succeeded by Shozaburo Jimi
Preceded by Yukihiko Ikeda	Policy Affairs Research Council Chairman of the Liberal Democratic Party; 1999–2001	Succeeded by Tarō Asō
Preceded by Takami Etō (Etō-Kamei faction)	Chairman of Shisuikai (Kamei faction); 2003–2005	Succeeded by Bunmei Ibuki (Ibuki faction)
Honorary titles
Preceded by Shintaro Ishihara	Oldest member of the House of Representatives of Japan; 2014–2017	Succeeded by Bunmei Ibuki
