= Kazuaki Miyaji =

Japanese politician

- 宮路 和明
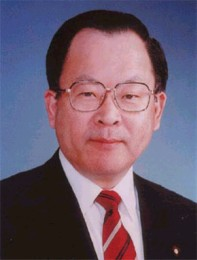
- Official portrait, 2001

Member of the House of Representatives
- In office 29 October 2012 – 21 November 2014
- Preceded by: Tadahiro Matsushita
- Succeeded by: Takuma Miyaji
- Constituency: Kagoshima 3rd (2012); Kyushu PR (2012–2014)
- In office 19 February 1990 – 21 July 2009
- Preceded by: Sukenari Nagano
- Succeeded by: Tadahiro Matsushita
- Constituency: Kagoshima 1st (1990–1996); Kyushu PR (1996–2000); Kagoshima 3rd (2000–2009)

Personal details
- Born: 29 November 1940 (age 85) Kasasa, Kagoshima, Japan
- Party: Liberal Democratic
- Children: Takuma Miyaji
- Education: University of Tokyo

Kazuaki Miyaji (宮路 和明, Miyaji Kazuaki; born 29 November 1940) is a former Japanese politician of the Liberal Democratic Party (LDP), who served as a member of the House of Representatives in the Diet (national legislature). A native of Kawanabe District, Kagoshima and graduate of the University of Tokyo, he joined the Ministry of Agriculture, Forestry and Fisheries. He was elected to the House of Representatives for the first time in 1990.

Political offices
Preceded by Chieko Nōno; Keigo Masuya	Senior Vice Minister of Health, Labour and Welfare; 2002; Served alongside: Yasu Kanō	Succeeded by Ichirō Kamoshita; Yoshio Kimura
House of Representatives (Japan)
Preceded by Tadahiro Matsushita	Representative for Kagoshima 3rd district 2000–2009	Succeeded by Tadahiro Matsushita
New title Introduction of proportional voting	Representative for the Kyūshū proportional representation block 1996–2000	Succeeded by N/A
Preceded by Sukenari Nagano; Moichi Miyazaki; Kanji Kawasaki; Tatsuo Shinmori	Representative for Kagoshima 1st district (multi-member); 1990–1996; Served alongside: Tatsuo Shinmori, Kanji Kawasaki, Moichi Miyazaki, Okiharu Yasuoka, Torao Tokuda	District eliminated
