= Hirotake Yasuoka =

Japanese politician (born 1973)

- 保岡 宏武
- Official portrait, 2026

Member of the House of Representatives
- Incumbent
- Assumed office 9 February 2026
- Constituency: Kyushu PR
- In office 5 November 2021 – 9 October 2024
- Constituency: Kyushu PR

Personal details
- Born: 6 May 1973 (age 53) Naze, Kagoshima, Japan
- Party: Liberal Democratic
- Parent: Okiharu Yasuoka (father)
- Relatives: Takehisa Yasuoka (grandfather)
- Education: Aoyama Gakuin University; Kagoshima University

Hirotake Yasuoka (保岡宏武, Yasuoka Hirotake; born 6 May 1973) is a Japanese politician. He has been a member of the House of Representatives since 2026, having previously served from 2021 to 2024. He is the son of Okiharu Yasuoka.
