= Kyoko Nishikawa =

Japanese politician (born 1945)

- 西川 京子
- Official portrait, 2013

Member of the House of Representatives
- In office 21 December 2012 – 21 November 2014
- Constituency: Kyushu PR
- In office 26 June 2000 – 21 July 2009
- Preceded by: Multi-member district
- Succeeded by: Takashi Kii
- Constituency: Kyushu PR (2000–2005); Fukuoka 10th (2005–2009)

Personal details
- Born: 2 October 1945 (age 81) Ōme, Tokyo, Japan
- Party: Liberal Democratic
- Education: Waseda University

Kyoko Nishikawa (西川 京子, Nishikawa Kyōko; born 2 October 1945) is a Japanese political activist of the Liberal Democratic Party, who served as a member of House of Representatives in the Diet (national legislature).

== Biography ==
A native of Ōme, Tokyo and graduate of Waseda University Faculty of Education, Nishikawa was elected for the first time in 2000.

Her husband Hiroshi Nishikawa, a banker, is a mayor in Ashikita District, Kumamoto Prefecture.

Her profile on the LDP website:

- Director, Committee on Health, Labour and Welfare
- Member, Commission on the Constitution
- Director, Special Committee on Consumer Affairs
- Deputy Chairman, Policy Research Council of LDP

== Ideology ==
Kyoko Nishikawa, a former Lower House member of the ruling Liberal Democratic Party who served as senior vice education minister, said to the effect that Japan waged the war to help all the nations of Asia prosper and gain independence.

Nishikawa is affiliated to the openly revisionist lobby Nippon Kaigi, and a member of several right-wing Diet groups:

- Secretary General, Diet Members to Discuss Japanese Future and History Education (日本の前途と歴史教育を考える議員の会)
- Deputy Secretary General, Nippon Kaigi Diet discussion group (日本会議国会議員懇談会 - Nippon kaigi kokkai giin kondankai)
- Pro-Yasukuni Alliance (みんなで靖国神社に参拝する国会議員の会)
- Conference of young parliamentarians supporting the idea that the Yasukuni Shrine is a true national interest and desire for peace (平和を願い真の国益を考え靖国神社参拝を支持する若手国会議員の会)
- Alliance of Diet Members for Acting Toward the Fast Rescue of Japanese Victims Kidnapped by North Korea (北朝鮮に拉致された日本人を早期に救出するために行動する議員連盟 - Kita Chousen ni rachi sareta Nipponjin wo souki kyuushutsu suru tame ni koudou suru giin renmei)
- Japan Rebirth (創生「日本」- Sosei Nippon)
- Parliamentarians acting to protect the Japanese territory (日本の領土を守るため行動する議員連盟)

Nishikawa is also a member of the Japan Buddhist Federation (全日本仏教会).

In 2013, Nishikawa referred to sexual slavery for the Imperial military ('Comfort women') as "mere prostitution".

Nishikawa gave the following answers to the questionnaire submitted by Mainichi to parliamentarians in 2014:

- in favor of the revision of the Article 9 of the Japanese Constitution
- in favor of the right of collective self-defense
- in favor of nuclear plants
- no problem for visits of a Prime Minister to the controversial Yasukuni Shrine
- in favor of the revision of the Murayama Statement
- in favor of the revision of the Kono Statement
- against laws preventing hate speech
- considers Marine Corps Air Station Futenma is a burden for Okinawa
- in favor of the Special Secrecy Law
- in favor of teaching 'morality' in school
