= Takuma Miyaji =

Japanese politician (born 1979)

- 宮路 拓馬
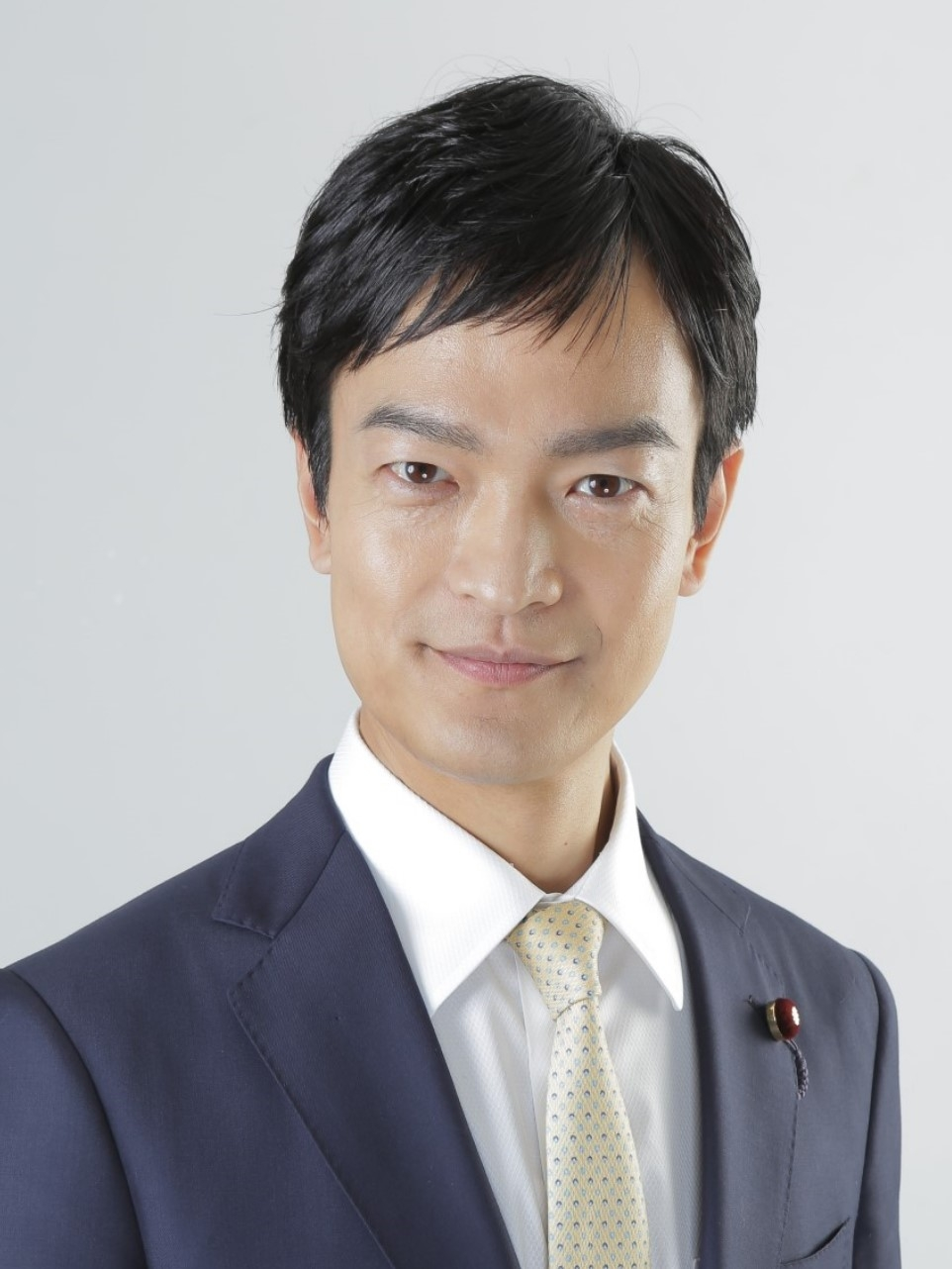
- Official portrait, 2021

Member of the House of Representatives
- Incumbent
- Assumed office 19 December 2014
- Preceded by: Kazuaki Miyaji
- Constituency: Kyushu PR (2014–2021); Kagoshima 1st (2021–2024); Kyushu PR (2024–2026); Kagoshima 1st (2026–present)

Personal details
- Born: 6 December 1979 (age 46) Minamisatsuma, Kagoshima, Japan
- Party: Liberal Democratic
- Parent: Kazuaki Miyaji (father)
- Education: University of Tokyo

Takuma Miyaji (宮路拓馬, Miyaji Takuma; born 6 December 1979) is a Japanese politician serving as a member of the House of Representatives since 2014. He is the son of Kazuaki Miyaji.
