= Hisashi Miura =

Japanese politician (1931–2024)

- 三浦 久

Member of the House of Representatives
- In office 19 February 1990 – 18 June 1993
- Preceded by: Chienori Ogata
- Succeeded by: Kozo Yamamoto
- Constituency: Fukuoka 4th
- In office 8 October 1979 – 2 June 1986
- Preceded by: Shūji Kurauchi
- Succeeded by: Kiyoshi Kaji
- Constituency: Fukuoka 4th
- In office 11 December 1972 – 9 December 1976
- Preceded by: Shūji Kurauchi
- Succeeded by: Shūji Kurauchi
- Constituency: Fukuoka 4th

Personal details
- Born: 1 January 1931 Ani, Akita, Japan
- Died: 3 April 2024 (aged 93) Kitakyushu, Fukuoka, Japan
- Party: Communist
- Education: Meiji University
- Occupation: Lawyer

Hisashi Miura (Japanese: 三浦 久 Miura Hisashi; 1 January 1931 – 3 April 2024) was a Japanese lawyer and politician. A member of the Japanese Communist Party, he served in the House of Representatives from 1972 to 1976, 1979 to 1986, and 1990 to 1993.

Miura died on 3 April 2024, at the age of 93.
