= Nobuaki Futami =

Japanese politician (born 1935)

- 二見 伸明

Minister of Transport
- In office 28 April 1994 – 30 June 1994
- Prime Minister: Tsutomu Hata
- Preceded by: Shigeru Itō
- Succeeded by: Shizuka Kamei

Member of the House of Representatives; from Northern Kanto
- In office 18 December 1983 – 2 June 2000
- Preceded by: Jūjirō Tosaka
- Succeeded by: Multi-member district
- Constituency: Ibaraki 3rd (1983–1996); PR block (1996–2000)
- In office 9 December 1976 – 19 May 1980
- Preceded by: Naokichi Kitazawa
- Succeeded by: Jūjirō Tosaka
- Constituency: Ibaraki 3rd
- In office 29 December 1969 – 13 November 1972
- Preceded by: Yōnosuke Satō
- Succeeded by: Takeshi Takeuchi
- Constituency: Ibaraki 3rd

Personal details
- Born: 10 February 1935 (age 91) Taitō, Tokyo, Japan
- Party: Kōmeitō (1969–1994)
- Other political affiliations: NFP (1994–1998); LP (1998–2003); DPJ (2003)
- Education: Waseda University

Nobuaki Futami (born 10 February 1935) is a Japanese politician. He attended Waseda University. Futami was a member of the House of Representatives of Japan from 1969 to 2000. He was also Minister of Transport for the Hata Cabinet in 1994.
