= Kozo Yamamoto =

Japanese politician (born 1948)

- 山本 幸三
- Official portrait, 2016

Minister of State for Regional Revitalization
- In office 3 August 2016 – 3 August 2017
- Prime Minister: Shinzo Abe
- Preceded by: Shigeru Ishiba
- Succeeded by: Hiroshi Kajiyama

Minister for Administrative Reform and Regulatory Reform
- In office 3 August 2016 – 3 August 2017
- Prime Minister: Shinzo Abe
- Preceded by: Tarō Kōno
- Succeeded by: Hiroshi Kajiyama

Member of the House of Representatives
- In office 11 September 2005 – 14 October 2021
- Preceded by: Multi-member district
- Succeeded by: Takashi Kii
- Constituency: Kyushu PR (2005–2012); Fukuoka 10th (2012–2021)
- In office 18 July 1993 – 10 October 2003
- Preceded by: Hisashi Miura
- Succeeded by: Ryota Takeda
- Constituency: Fukuoka 4th (1993–1996); Fukuoka 11th (1996–2003)

Personal details
- Born: 8 August 1948 (age 78) Yukuhashi, Fukuoka, Japan
- Party: Liberal Democratic (1990–1993; 1997–present)
- Other political affiliations: JRP (1993–1994); NFP (1994–1997)
- Education: University of Tokyo; Cornell University

Kozo Yamamoto (山本 幸三, Yamamoto Kōzō; born 8 August 1948) is a Japanese politician of the Liberal Democratic Party (LDP), who is a former Ministry of Finance official, and a member of the House of Representatives in the Diet (national legislature). He served as State Minister in charge of: Regional Revitalization; Regulatory Reform; Administrative Reform; City, People, Job-Creation; and Civil Service Reform from 2016 to 2017. Previous posts include Vice Minister of Economy, Trade, and Industry (in the 2006 cabinet of Shinzo Abe), Chairman of the Judicial Affairs Committee of the House of Representatives, Chairman of the Special Commission on Consumer Issues, and Chairman of the Special Commission on Regional Revitalization.

He is known to be one of the main fathers of Abenomics. A native of Yukuhashi, Fukuoka, Yamamoto attended the University of Tokyo and received his MBA from Cornell University in the United States. He was elected to the House of Representatives for the first time in 1993 after an unsuccessful run in 1990.

Tatsuo Murayama, Yamamoto's father in law, was an LDP member of the House of Representatives who served as Minister of Finance and Minister of Health and Welfare. His uncle, Momotaro Yanagida, was mayor of the City of Moji (Fukuoka Prefecture) and a member of the House of Representatives.

== Early life and career ==
Yamamoto was born in the city of Moji, in Fukuoka Prefecture. He lived in Fukuoka until graduating from Miyako High School in 1967. He would later join the Ministry of Finance immediately upon graduating from the University of Tokyo's Faculty of Economics in 1971. During his time at the ministry, Yamamoto studied abroad for two years at Cornell University's Samuel Curtis Johnson Graduate School of Management, where he acquired his MBA in 1975. After his return to Japan, he was stationed as head of the Iwakuni Tax Office in Yamaguchi Prefecture. Yamamoto subsequently took various postings within the Ministry of Finance and a visiting researcher position at Harvard University's Center for International Affairs, until 1987 when he took the role of head secretary for then Minister of Finance and future Prime Minister, Kiichi Miyazawa. He also began lecturing at Kyushu International University in 1991.

== Political career ==
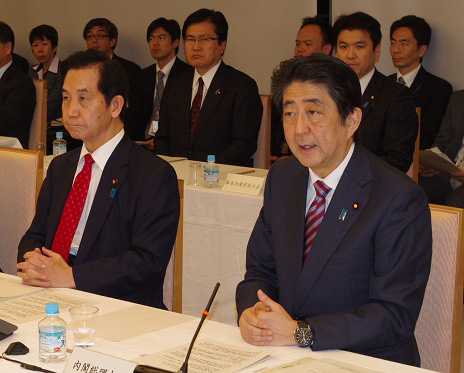
12 December 2016 at the Kantei with Prime Minister Shinzo Abe (right)

Yamamoto initially ran under the LDP in the general election of 1990 in the fourth precinct of Fukuoka, but could barely not secure any of the four allotted lower house seats. He returned in 1993 to the same precinct for the next general election under the newly formed Japan Renewal Party (an LDP split-off), and won first place out of the four elected representatives. In 1994, Yamamoto joined the New Frontier Party and entered the 1996 race in the newly created 11th precinct of Fukuoka as a PR candidate following the parallel voting system reform, defeating Sekisuke Nakanishi of the Social Democratic Party and Ryota Takeda of the LDP. Yamamoto left the New Frontier Party before it disbanded in 1997. For the next general election of 2000, he once again ran in the 11th precinct, but this time as a conservative independent, and again garnered more votes than Nakinishi and Takeda.

Yamamoto lost his seat for a brief period of two years after he rejoined the LDP for the election of 2003. Takeda, who this time conversely ran as an independent, defeated Yamamoto by 16,000 votes. Takeda went on to rejoin the LDP in 2004, but was rejected the party position for the 2005 election due to his opposition of the Postal Service Privatization Act. Although Yamamoto took the main LDP slot in an attempt for a 2005 comeback, Takeda had overwhelming support from the Komeito party, narrowly defeating Yamamoto—since he was simultaneously running for a proportionally represented constituency seat as well, however, Yamamoto was able to secure a position in the Kyushu PR Bloc. He was appointed Vice Minister of Economy, Trade, and Industry under the first Shinzo Abe Cabinet in September 2006.

The general election of 2009 saw both Takeda and Yamamoto vying for the LDP slot of Fukuoka's 11th precinct. Yamamoto ultimately took the PR spot for Kyushu, and even with the political turnaround of the Democratic Party of Japan winning 221 of 300 electoral districts, both Takeda and Yamamoto won their respective seats. In 2012, Yamamoto successfully ran under the LDP in the 10th precinct of Fukuoka. He continued his electoral success in the same precinct in 2014, and was appointed his ministerships in 2016.

== Policies ==
=== Monetary easing ===
Yamamoto is a known advocate of reflation policies, and is one of the first to argue for using monetary easing tools to overcome deflation in Japan. As a longtime critic of the Bank of Japan's monetary tightening policies in the Diet, he chaired multiple study groups on monetary policy when the LDP was out of power, and appealed to Shinzo Abe the need for quantitative easing.

=== Consumption tax ===
Yamamoto proposed the consumption tax increase of April 2014 to Abe Shinzo, and advised swift action. He also advocated for basic allowances and various public-works projects for low-income earners (among other economic policies) through a revised budget that matched the tax increase. After citing unexpected economic indicators, however, Yamamoto proposed a postponement of further consumption tax increases and concomitant policies in October of the same year.

== Affiliated organizations and diet caucuses ==
- Nippon kaigi kokkaigiin kondankai 日本会議国会議員懇談会 Japan National Informal Gathering of Diet Members.
- Shintou seijirenmei kokkaigiin kondankai 神道政治連盟国会議員懇談会 Shinto All-party Parliamentary Group Informal Gathering of Diet Members.
- Minna de yasukunijinja ni sanpai suru kokkaigiin no kai みんなで靖国神社に参拝する国会議員の会 Group-visit to Yasukuni Shrine Diet Members' Assembly.
- TPP koushou ni okeru kokueki wo mamorinuku kai TPP交渉における国益を守り抜く会 Committee on Protecting National Interests Throughout TPP Negotiations.
- Defure・endakakaishou wo kakujitu ni suru kai デフレ・円高解消を確実にする会（会長） Committee on Ensuring the Resolution of Deflation And a High-Valued Yen. (Chairman).
- Nihonmyanmaa yuukou giinrenmei 本日・ミャンマー友好議員連盟（幹事長）Japan-Myanmar Friendship Diet Caucus. (Secretary-General).

== Books ==
- Toyo no kuni, kitakyushu ni tatsu (豊の国、北九州に立つ), Standing for Northern Kyusyu: the Land of Abundance, 1988.
- Nihon hakyoku no shinario (日本破局のシナリオ), Scenarios of The Collapse of Japan (Co-authored), 1995.
- Nihon wo sukuu kokkaironnsen (日本を救う国会論戦), Tactics in Parliament That Can Save Japan, 1997.
- Keikikaifuku no kagi wa nichigin ni ari! (景気回復のカギは日銀にあり!) The Key to an Economic Comeback Lies in The Bank of Japan!
- Nihonkeizaisaisei ni mukete nani wo subekika (日本経済再生に向けて何をすべきか) What is to be done for Japanese Economic Recovery.
- Ichimonittou・tokutei chouteihou (一問一答・特定調停法 (監修)) Q&A on The Special Settlement Act (Editor), 2000.
- Saikenhouki koso, keikikaifuku no kagi da! (債権放棄こそ、景気回復のカギだ!) Debt Forgiveness is The Key to an Economic Comeback!
- Nichigin ni tsunbusareta nihonkeizai (日銀につぶされた日本経済), The Japanese Economy: Ruined by The Bank of Japan, 2010.
