= Susumu Kajiyama =

Japanese criminal

- 梶山 進
- Born: 1950 (age 75–76)
- Organization: Mio-gumi (former member)
- Criminal charge: Money laundering

Susumu Kajiyama (梶山 進, Kajiyama Susumu; born around 1950) is a retired yakuza best known for his arrest in 2003, who was dubbed the "loan shark king". He has been introduced as a senior member of the Shizuoka-based Goryo-kai, a secondary organization of Japan's largest yakuza syndicate, the Yamaguchi-gumi, although he was technically not a member of the Goryo-kai.

== Career ==
He began his career as a yakuza after graduating from middle school, when he met the head of the Suzuki-gumi, an Inagawa affiliate, in jail. He joined the Suzuki-gumi and founded a yamikin organization in Shinjuku, Tokyo, launching his underground financial business.

He left the Suzuki-gumi in 1997 and along with his elementary school senior Yasuo Takagi, he joined the Shizuoka-based Mio-gumi, a tertiary organization of the Yamaguchi-gumi.

=== Goryo-kai ===
In October 2002, following the retirement of the head of the Mio-gumi, Yasuo Takagi formed the Goryo-kai as the successor to the Mio-gumi. Kajiyama didn't join the Goryo-kai, retiring from the Yakuza world, but kept a strong connection with the Goryo-kai as the CEO of the Goryo-kai's underground finance ring.

=== Arrest ===
He was operating over 1,000 underground loan companies by August 2003, with estimated annual earnings of over $1 billion. In August 2003 he was arrested for violating the investment law by "supervising moneylenders providing loans at unlawfully high interest rates". He was convicted of 14 charges against him by 2005, and was sentenced to seven years in prison in February for money laundering involving the Standard Chartered Bank and Credit Suisse.

== Involvement in politics ==
In August 2003, Shizuka Kamei, then a senior member of the ruling Liberal Democratic Party and former Senior Superintendent of the National Police Agency, acknowledged receiving political donations from Kajiyama.
