= Takaaki Tamura =

Japanese politician

- 田村 貴昭
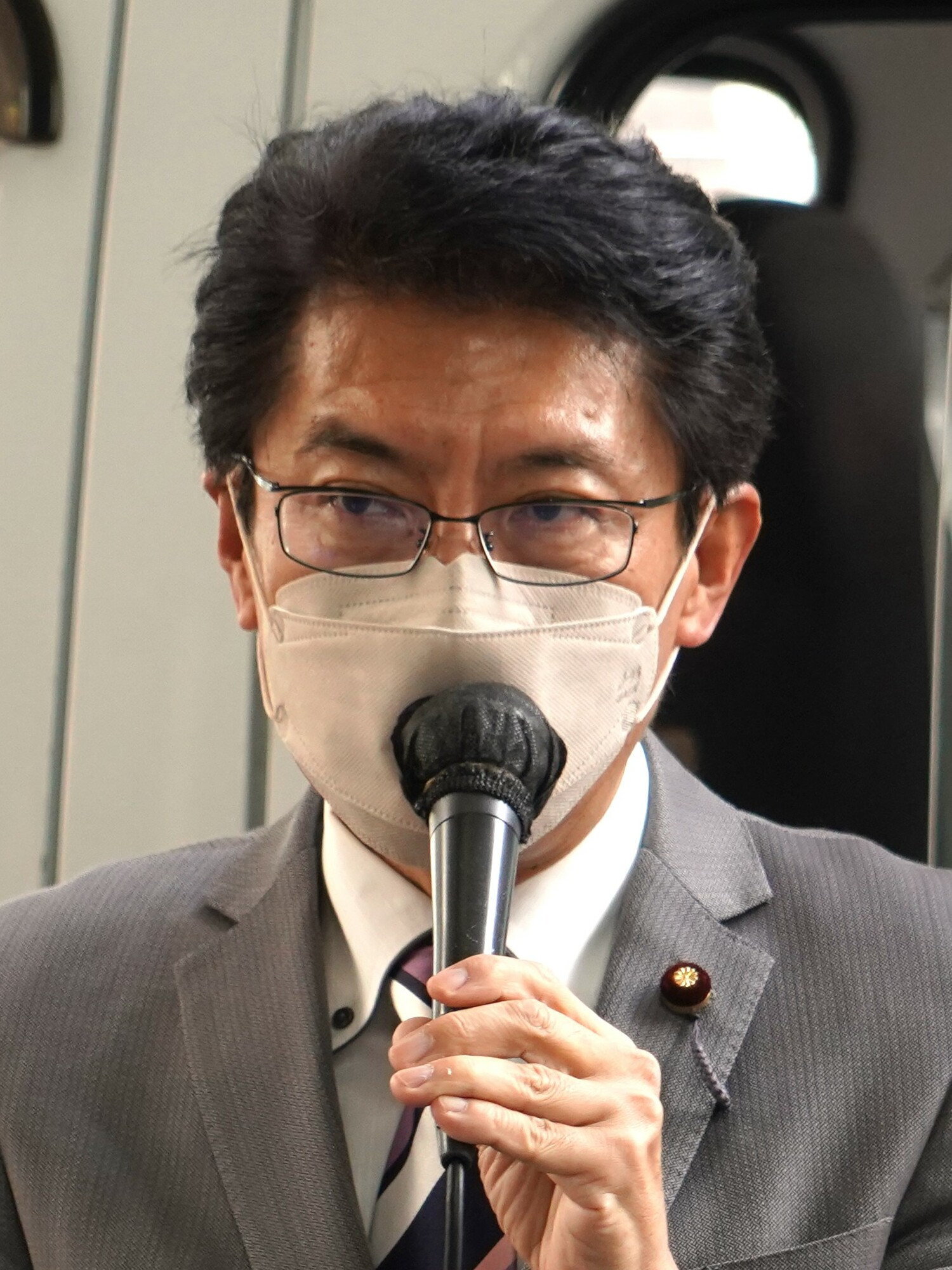
- Tamura in 2022

Member of the House of Representatives
- In office 19 December 2014 – 23 January 2026
- Preceded by: Seiken Akamine
- Succeeded by: Multi-member district
- Constituency: Kyushu PR

Member of the Kitakyushu City Council
- In office 1997–2005
- Constituency: Kokurakita Ward

Personal details
- Born: 30 April 1961 (age 65) Hirakata, Osaka, Japan
- Party: Communist
- Education: University of Kitakyushu
- Website: 田村貴昭オフィシャルサイト

Takaaki Tamura (田村 貴昭, Tamura Takaaki; born 30 April 1961) is a Japanese politician of the Japanese Communist Party who served as a member of the House of Representatives. He thinks that foreign workers should be protected by worker protection rules.
