= Okiharu Yasuoka =

Japanese politician (1939–2019)

- 保岡 興治
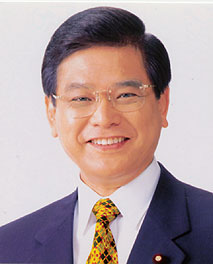
- Official portrait, 2007

Minister of Justice
- In office 2 August 2008 – 24 September 2008
- Prime Minister: Yasuo Fukuda
- Preceded by: Kunio Hatoyama
- Succeeded by: Eisuke Mori
- In office 4 July 2000 – 5 December 2000
- Prime Minister: Yoshirō Mori
- Preceded by: Hideo Usui
- Succeeded by: Masahiko Kōmura

Member of the House of Representatives
- In office 19 December 2012 – 28 September 2017
- Preceded by: Hiroshi Kawauchi
- Succeeded by: Hiroshi Kawauchi
- Constituency: Kagoshima 1st
- In office 19 July 1993 – 21 July 2009
- Preceded by: Tatsuo Shinmori
- Succeeded by: Hiroshi Kawauchi
- Constituency: Former Kagoshima 1st (1993–1996); Kagoshima 1st (1996–2009)
- In office 11 December 1972 – 24 January 1990
- Preceded by: Eikō Yutaka
- Succeeded by: Torao Tokuda
- Constituency: Amami Islands

Personal details
- Born: 11 May 1939 Chiyoda, Tokyo, Japan
- Died: 19 April 2019 (aged 79) Tokyo, Japan
- Party: Liberal Democratic (1976–1994; 1995–2019)
- Other political affiliations: Independent (1972–1976); NFP (1994–1995)
- Children: Hirotake Yasuoka
- Education: Chuo University

Okiharu Yasuoka (保岡 興治, Yasuoka Okiharu; 11 May 1939 – 19 April 2019) was a Japanese politician of the Liberal Democratic Party (LDP), a member of the House of Representatives in the Diet (national legislature). A native of Kagoshima Prefecture and graduate of Chuo University, he was elected to the House of Representatives for the first time in 1972 as an independent. He later joined the LDP and served as the Minister of Justice from 2000 to 2001. He was later returned to the post of Minister of Justice under Prime Minister Yasuo Fukuda on 1 August 2008.

Yasuoka was a licensed attorney. He left the LDP in 1994 to join the now-defunct Shinshinto party, but returned to the LDP in 1995. Yasuoka is known to have worked himself and his staff very long hours. He was one of the key participants in the launch of Fukuda's administration in 2007. Yasuoka also chaired the LDP's Constitution Research Commission.

An avid jogger and swimmer, Yasuoka repeatedly swam the 2.1 km-wide Kinko Bay in Kagoshima Prefecture.

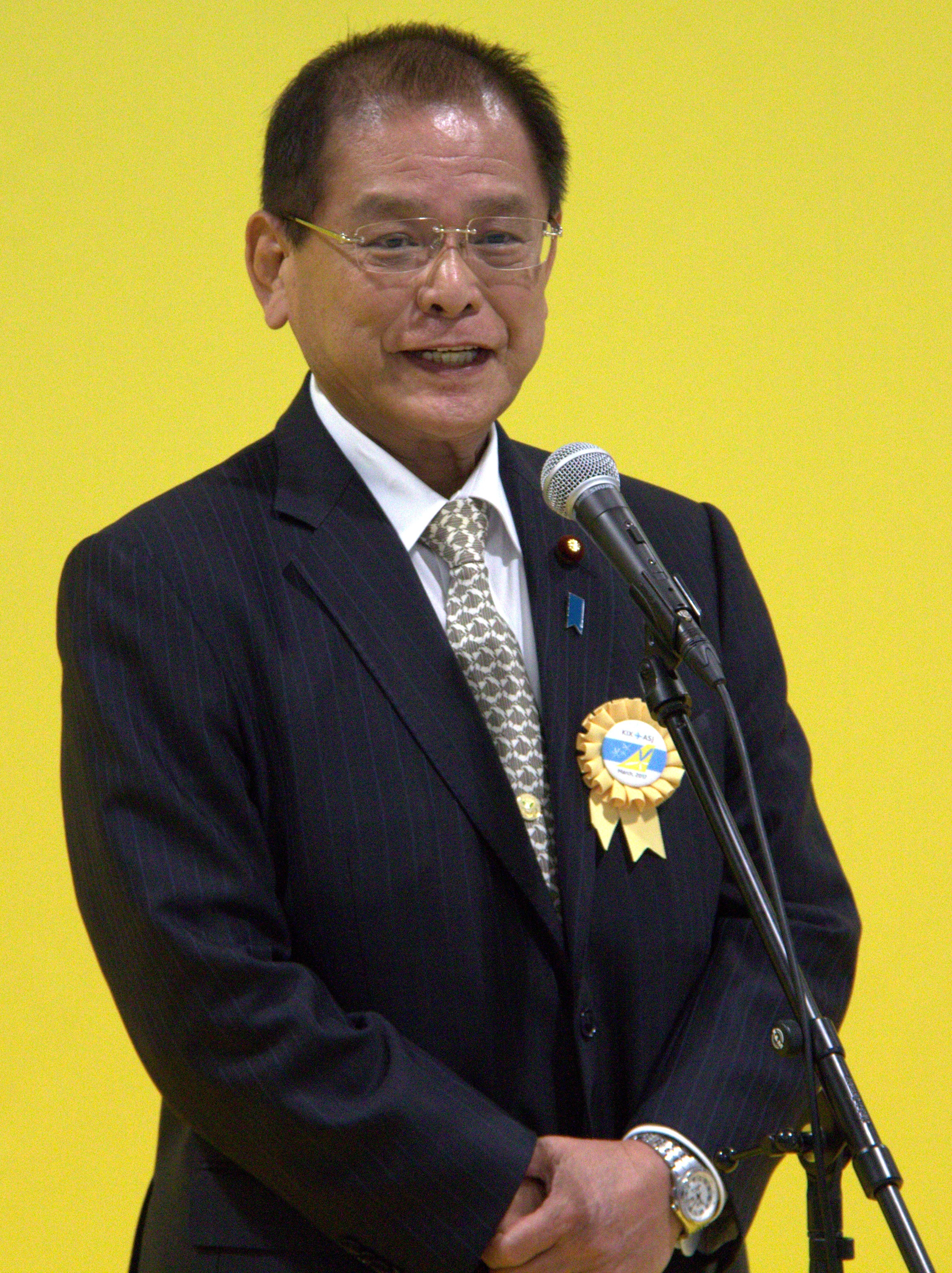
Yasuoka in 2017

In October 2017, Yasuoka retired after doctors discovered his cancer. Yasuoka's son ran, but lost to Hiroshi Kawauchi of the Constitutional Democratic Party of Japan.

Yasuoka died of cancer on 19 April 2019 at a Tokyo hospital, at the age of 79.

House of Representatives (Japan)
Preceded by Kōichi Hamada	Chair, Lower House Committee on Construction; 1984–1986	Succeeded by Tsutomu Karawa
Preceded by Koichi Kato	Chair, Lower House Special Committee on Political Ethics and Election Law; 2012–2014	Succeeded by Taku Yamamoto
Political offices
Preceded by Hideo Usui	Minister of Justice of Japan; 2000	Succeeded by Masahiko Kōmura
Preceded by Kunio Hatoyama	Minister of Justice of Japan; 2008	Succeeded by Eisuke Mori
