= Haruka Yoshimura (politician) =

Japanese politician (born 1985)

- 吉村 悠

Member of the House of Representatives
- Incumbent
- Assumed office 9 February 2026
- Preceded by: Takashi Kii
- Constituency: Fukuoka 10th

Member of the Fukuoka Prefectural Assembly
- In office 2011–2024
- Constituency: Kitakyushu City Kokuraminami Ward

Personal details
- Born: 23 October 1985 (age 40) Kitakyushu, Fukuoka, Japan
- Party: Liberal Democratic
- Education: Kyushu University

Haruka Yoshimura (吉村悠, Yoshimura Haruka; born 23 October 1985) is a Japanese politician serving as a member of the House of Representatives since 2026. From 2011 to 2024, he was a member of the Fukuoka Prefectural Assembly.
