= Masashi Furukawa =

Japanese politician (1935–2026)

- 古川 雅司

Member of the House of Representatives
- In office 18 December 1983 – 24 January 1990
- Preceded by: Yoshito Fukuoka
- Succeeded by: Tatsukuni Komori
- Constituency: Hiroshima 3rd
- In office 9 December 1976 – 19 May 1980
- Preceded by: Tadanori Nagayama
- Succeeded by: Yoshito Fukuoka
- Constituency: Hiroshima 3rd
- In office 27 December 1969 – 13 November 1972
- Preceded by: Yoshito Fukuoka
- Succeeded by: Yoshito Fukuoka
- Constituency: Hiroshima 3rd

Personal details
- Born: 12 December 1935 Hiroshima Prefecture, Japan
- Died: 7 February 2026 (aged 90) Fukuyama, Hiroshima, Japan
- Party: Komeito
- Education: Yamagata University (BE)
- Occupation: Engineer

Masashi Furukawa (Japanese: 古川雅司 Furukawa Masashi; 12 December 1935 – 7 February 2026) was a Japanese politician. A member of Komeito, he served in the House of Representatives from 1969 to 1990.

Furukawa died in Fukuyama on 7 February 2026, at the age of 90.
