= People's New Party =

Defunct political party in Japan

People's New Party 国民新党
- President: Shozaburo Jimi
- Founded: 17 August 2005
- Dissolved: 22 March 2013
- Headquarters: Kohase Bldg. 3F, Hirakawa-cho 2-14-7, Chiyoda, Tokyo 102-0093
- Ideology: Conservatism
- Colours: Orange

Party flag

Website
- www.kokumin.or.jp

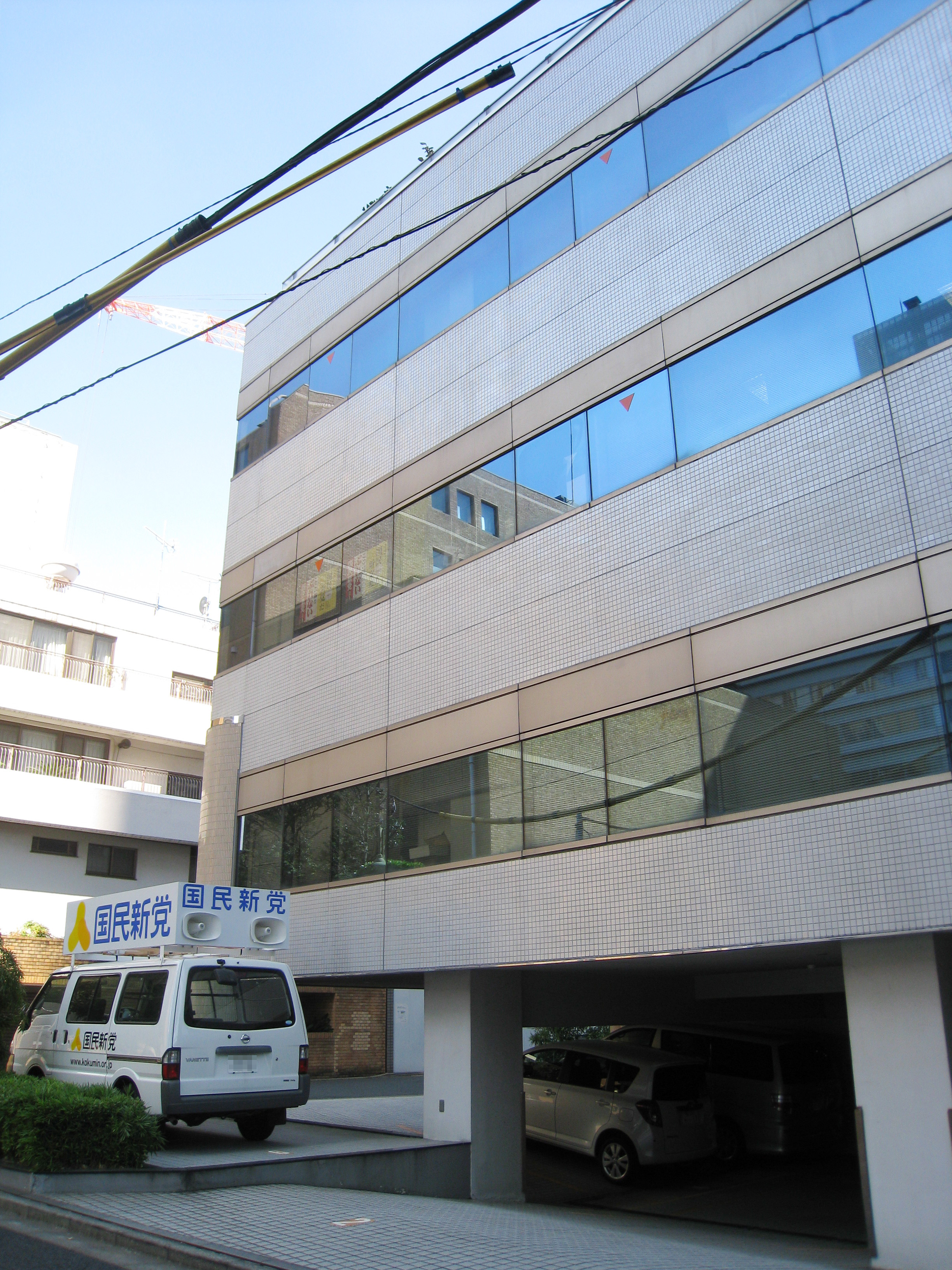
Headquarters of the People's New Party

The People's New Party (国民新党, Kokumin Shintō; PNP) was a Japanese political party formed on August 17, 2005, in the aftermath of the defeat of Prime Minister Junichiro Koizumi's Japan Post privatisation bills which led to a snap election. On March 21, 2013, party leader Shozaburo Jimi announced that he was disbanding the party.

== History ==
The Kokumin Shinto, originally headed by Shizuka Kamei, included former lower house speaker Tamisuke Watanuki, former Liberal Democratic Party (LDP) lower house members Hisaoki Kamei, Tadahiro Matsushita, and House of Councillors members Kensei Hasegawa from the LDP and Tamura Hideaki from the Democratic Party of Japan (DPJ), the main opposition.

Most of the members of the Kokumin Shinto were formerly members of the Shisuikai (also known as Kamei Faction) of the LDP. Their strong links to the postal lobby forced them to go against Koizumi's plans to privatise the postal system. While Watanuki was made party leader, Kamei was also seen as a public face for the party.

In the 2005 snap election, the party was able to retain four seats, matching the pre-election total, with two single-seat members (Watanuki and Shizuka Kamei) and two proportional members (Hisaoki Kamei and new member Masaki Itokawa). However, the overwhelming victory of the LDP, with a new two-thirds majority in the lower house, made it unlikely that they would be able to exert influence on government policy.

In June 2007, party head Shizuka Kamei announced that former President of Peru Alberto Fujimori would be running for a seat in the House of Councillors under the banner of the People's New Party. At the time of the initial announcement, Fujimori was under house arrest in Chile pending the outcome of an extradition hearing to decide whether he would be returned to Peru to face charges of corruption and human rights violations there. On 11 July 2007 Chilean Judge Orlando Alvarez ruled against the extradition; however, Fujimori remained under house arrest, and was unable to return to Japan for his campaign. He would ultimately fail in his bid.

After the 2009 general election, on 16 September 2009, a new government was formed; the PNP became a part of the ruling coalition led by the DPJ. After that the party suffered in the next Councillor election and general election.

== Ideology ==
People's New Party was described as having a far-right political position. The party was initially almost exclusively defined by its opposition to Koizumi's "dictatorial" (独裁的, dokusaiteki) politics as expressed in the post privatisation debate. Eventually their platform was broadened to include ideals of serving and protecting the people, and engaging in "warm, friendly politics".

== Election results ==
=== House of Representatives ===
Election	Leader	# of seats won	# of Constituency votes	% of Constituency vote	# of PR Block votes	% of PR Block vote	Government/opposition
2005	Tamisuke Watanuki	4 / 480	432,679	0.64	1,183,073	1.74	Opposition
2009	Tamisuke Watanuki	3 / 480	730,570	1.04	1,219,767	1.73	DPJ-PNP-SDP Government Coalition (2009-2010); DPJ-PNP Government Coalition (2010-2012)
2012	Shozaburo Jimi	1 / 480	117,185	0.20	70,847	0.12	Opposition

=== House of Councillors ===
Election	Leader	# of seats total	# of seats won	# of National votes	% of National vote	# of Prefectural votes	% of Prefectural vote
2007	Tamisuke Watanuki	4 / 242	2 / 121	1,269,209	2.15	1,111,005	1.87
2010	Shizuka Kamei	3 / 242	0 / 121	1,000,036	1.71	167,555	0.29

== Disbanded ==
On March 21, 2013, party leader Shozaburo Jimi announced that he was disbanding the party. At that time only Jimi and Kazuyuki Hamada remained as diet representatives.

== See also ==
- Liberal Democratic Party (Japan)
