= 2005 Japanese general election =

- 11 September 2005

All 480 seats in the House of Representatives 241 seats needed for a majority
- Turnout: 67.51% (▲7.66pp; Const. votes); 67.46% (▲7.66pp; PR votes)
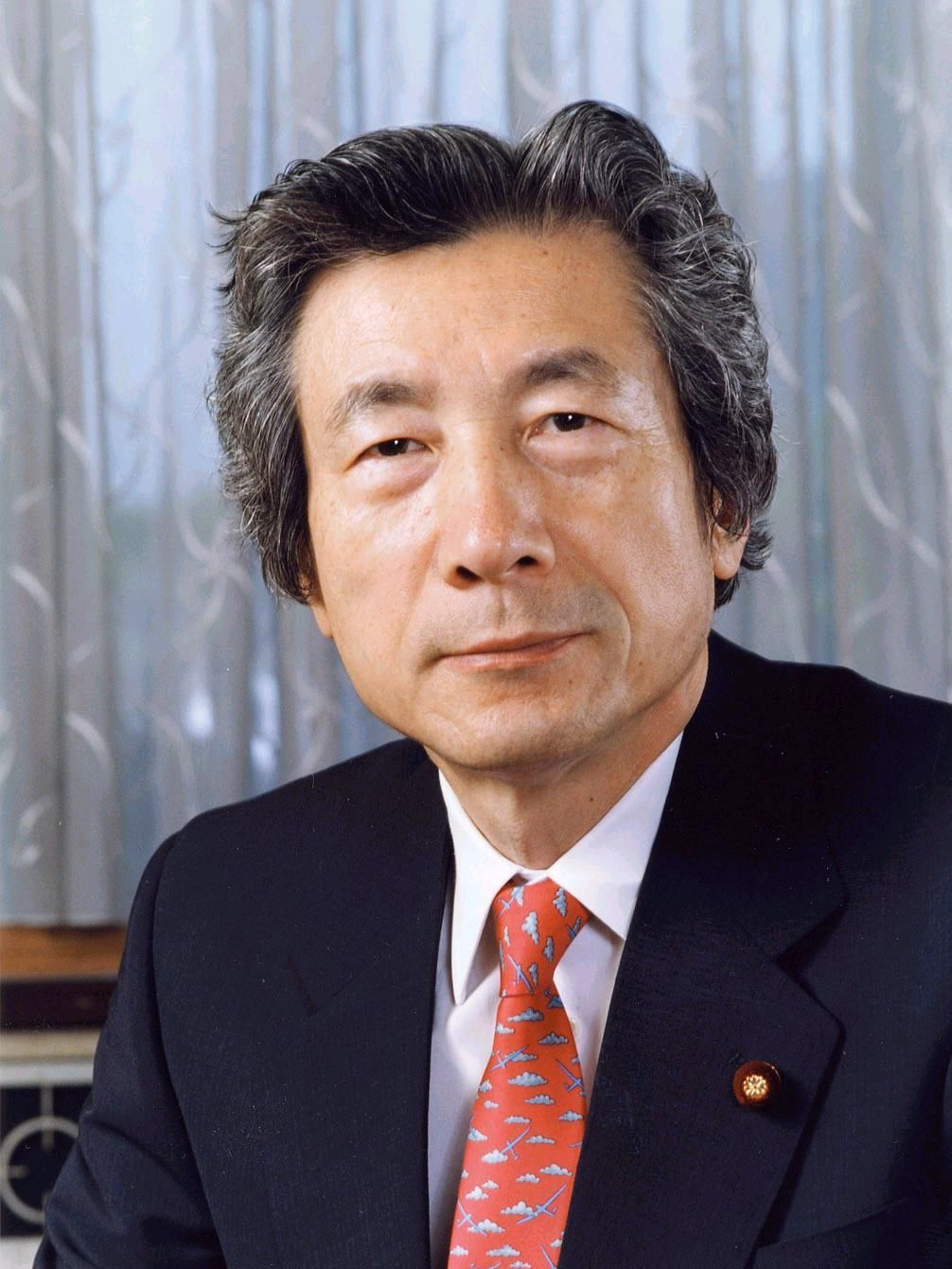

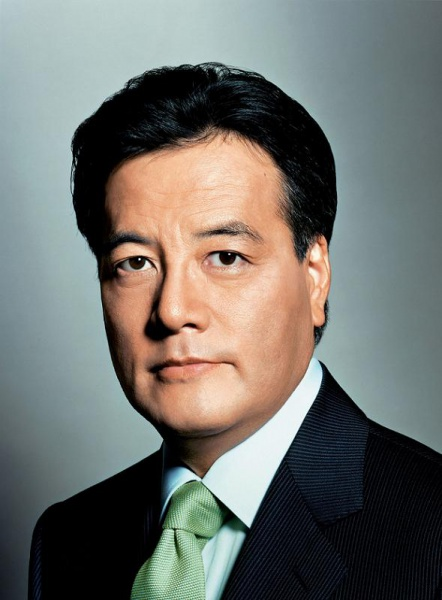

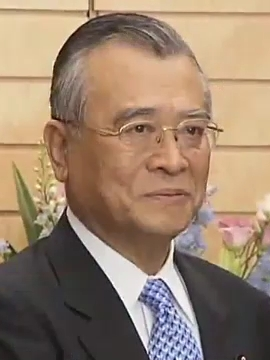

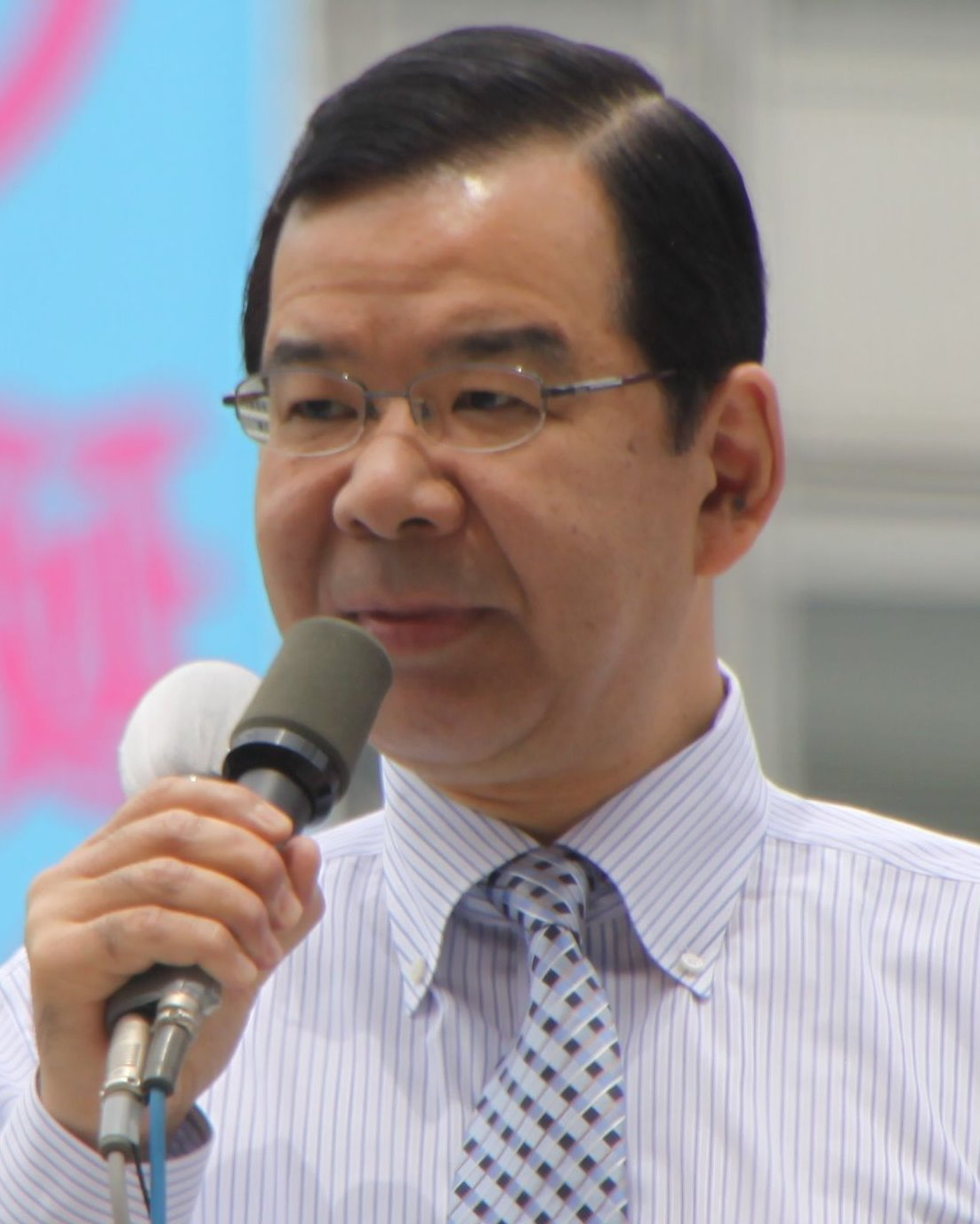

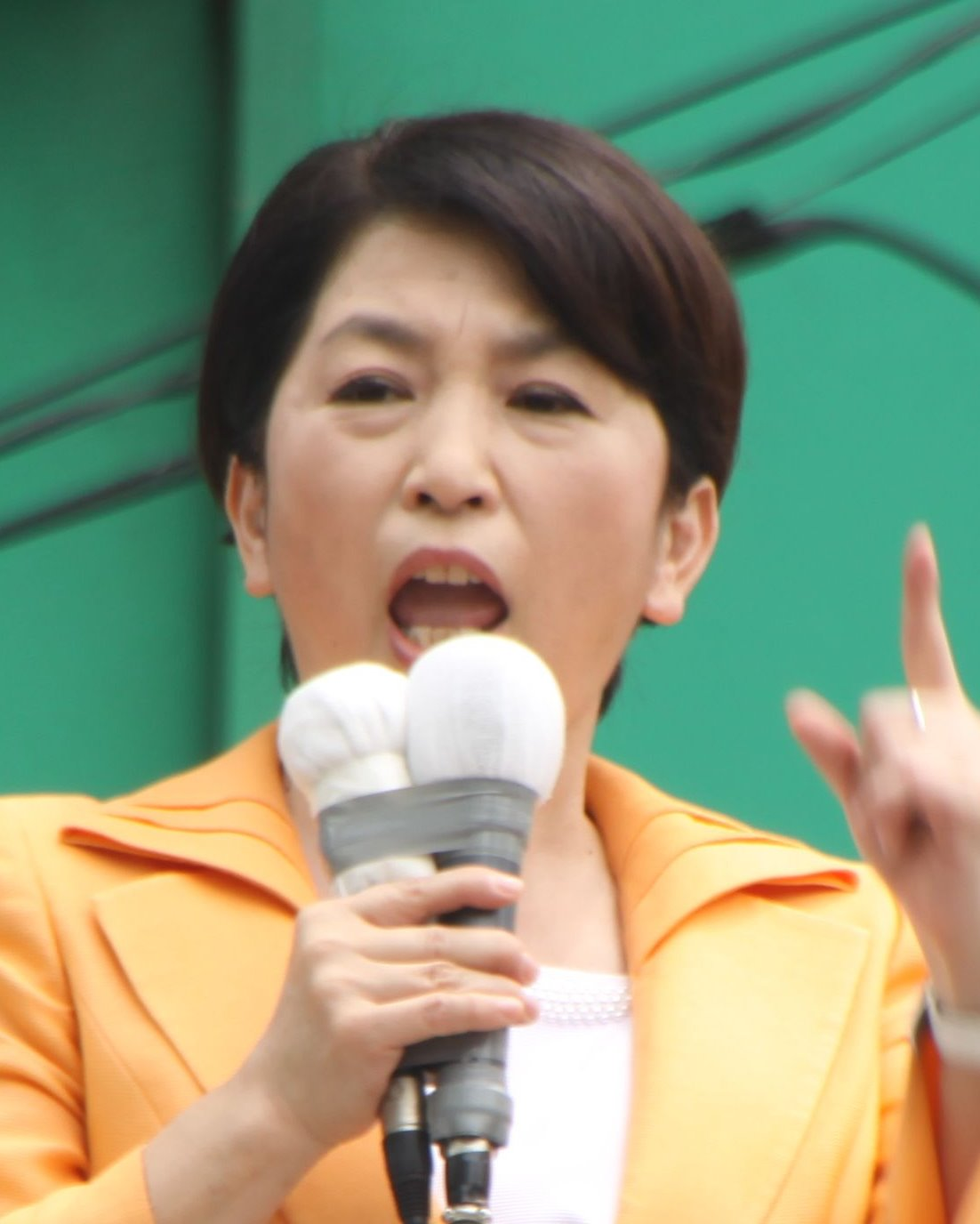

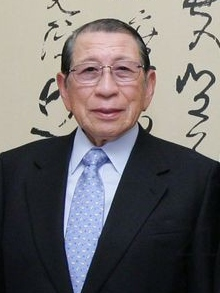
| | First party | Second party | Third party |
|---|---|---|---|
| Leader | Junichiro Koizumi | Katsuya Okada | Takenori Kanzaki |
| Party | LDP | Democratic | New Kōmeitō |
| Last election | 241 seats (Note: Liberal Democratic Party and New Conservative Party) | 177 seats | 34 seats |
| Seats before | 212 | 177 | 34 |
| Seats won | 296 | 113 | 31 |
| Seat change | ▲55 | ▼64 | ▼3 |
| Constituency vote | 32,518,390 | 24,804,787 | 981,105 |
| % and swing | 47.77% (▲3.92pp) | 36.44% (▼0.22pp) | 1.44% (▼0.05pp) |
| Regional vote | 25,887,798 | 21,036,425 | 8,987,620 |
| % and swing | 38.18% (▲3.22pp) | 31.02% (▼6.37pp) | 13.25% (▼1.53pp) |
| | Fourth party | Fifth party | Sixth party |
| Leader | Kazuo Shii | Mizuho Fukushima | Tamisuke Watanuki |
| Party | JCP | Social Democratic | People's New |
| Last election | 9 seats | 6 seats | Did not exist |
| Seats before | 9 | 5 | 4 |
| Seats won | 9 | 7 | 4 |
| Seat change | Steady | ▲1 | New |
| Constituency vote | 4,937,375 | 996,008 | 432,679 |
| % and swing | 7.25% (▼0.88pp) | 1.46% (▼1.21pp) | 0.64% (New) |
| Regional vote | 4,919,187 | 3,719,522 | 1,183,073 |
| % and swing | 7.25% (▼0.51pp) | 5.49% (▲0.37pp) | 1.74% (New) |
- Districts and PR districts, shaded according to winners' vote strength
Prime Minister before election
Junichiro Koizumi
LDP
Elected Prime Minister
Junichiro Koizumi
LDP

General elections were held in Japan on 11 September 2005 for all 480 seats of the House of Representatives, the lower house of the Diet. Prime Minister Junichiro Koizumi called the election almost two years before the end of the term taken from the previous elections in 2003, after bills to privatize Japan Post were voted down in the upper house (which cannot be dissolved), despite strong opposition from within his own Liberal Democratic Party (LDP).

The elections resulted in a landslide victory for Koizumi's LDP, with the party winning 296 seats, the largest share since World War II, and marked the first time the LDP had won an overall majority in the House of Representatives since 1990. With its partner, New Komeito, the governing coalition then commanded a two-thirds majority in the lower house, allowing them to pass legislative bills over the objections of the upper house and (though the government did not attempt this) to approve amendments to the Constitution, then submit them to the upper house and a national referendum.

The opposition Democratic Party (DPJ), which advocated a change of government during campaign, suffered a devastating loss, winning only 113 seats against the 175 seats it had previously held. The setback led to the resignation of DPJ leader Katsuya Okada and raised fears regarding whether or not the DPJ could remain an alternative to the LDP in future elections.

The small parties made only small gains or losses, with Koizumi's ally, New Komeito, falling slightly from 34 seats to 31. Of the new parties contesting the election, the New Party Japan fell from three seats to one, while the People's New Party was unchanged at four seats. The Japanese Communist Party held its ground with nine seats, while the Social Democratic Party won seven, a gain of one.

== Background ==
Prime Minister Junichiro Koizumi dissolved the House of Representatives and called for new elections on 8 August 2005. The move was made in response to the defeat of bills that would have split Japan Post into four private companies over a period of ten years, on which Koizumi had staked the credibility of his reforms. The package was notably unpopular within Koizumi's own Liberal Democratic Party; retired employees of Japan Post had been strong supporters of the LDP in past elections, and its banking system had bankrolled expensive public work projects, providing business for the LDP's supporters in the construction industry. Koizumi used the threat of an early election to push the bills through the House of Representatives (the lower house), where they were approved by a margin of just 5 votes. The same threat was less effective in the upper chamber, the House of Councillors, which the prime minister does not have the power to dissolve. On 8 August 2005, 30 LDP members of the House of Councillors joined the opposition in voting 'no' or abstaining to block the legislation. Koizumi had announced that a 'no' vote would be considered equivalent to a no confidence vote against his administration, and thus called a snap election for the House of Representatives.

The dissolution act itself proceeded relatively without controversy, being based on Article 7 of the Constitution of Japan, which can be interpreted as saying that the Prime Minister has the power to dissolve the lower house after advising the Emperor accordingly. Many politicians from both the government and the opposition camps, however, had criticized the unusual move of dissolving the lower house following an upper house defeat as both illogical and adversarial. Polls from Asahi Shimbun and others showed public support for Koizumi's decision to call an election. The approval rate for Koizumi's cabinet, in fact, leapt to 46 points when the election was called, and subsequently recovered to 50%, a very high rate by Japan's standards.

Before the dissolution, there was notable dissatisfaction with the decision to dissolve within the LDP, because the LDP and its government partner, New Kōmeitō, feared losing their majority in the lower house, which chooses the Prime Minister. In the previous lower-house election (2003) and upper-house election (2004), the Democratic Party (DPJ) had performed well, while the LDP was barely able to keep its majorities with a reduced number of seats despite the popularity of Koizumi. Election analysts ascribed the poor performance of the LDP to Koizumi's reforms having eroded its traditional supporters such as farmers, mom-and-pop shop owners and construction workers; the reforms, including deregulation and tax cuts, were tuned to help larger global corporations like Toyota. Many in the LDP, including Yoshiro Mori, former prime minister and Koizumi's long-time backer, showed a concern that the widening splits between Koizumi and the rebels within his party would help the competing DPJ candidates win seats in highly contested districts. At the height of the protest, Koizumi even had to dismiss his Agriculture, Forestry and Fisheries Minister, Yoshinobu Shimamura when he refused to sign the Imperial Ordinance for dissolution. There had also been concern that the so-called "political vacuum" created if both the LDP and the DPJ failed to gain a clear majority would impede the already sluggish recovery of the Japanese economy.

== Campaign ==
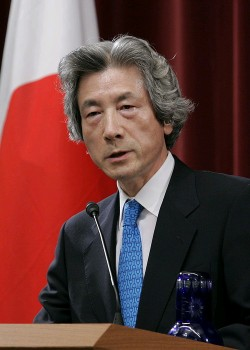
Koizumi addresses a press conference at the Kantei following the dissolution of the House, 8 August 2005.

Prime Minister Koizumi had tried to make the election a referendum on the privatization of Japan Post and reforms that follow, saying that he would step down if the ruling bloc fails to secure a majority. Indeed, the DPJ, which did not have a clear position on the privatization issue previously, was forced to come up with an alternative plan to shrink public savings in Japan Post over years to come. In addition, his personality was featured as prominently as policy in the election, as the electorate were asked to determine whether Koizumi's behavior, variously described as either determined or pugnacious, was acceptable for a Japanese prime minister.

The main opposition, the liberal and center-left Democratic Party (DPJ), saw the election as a chance to end the LDP's nearly continuous 50-year control of the government and reform government spending and employment. Many analysts believed that the DPJ would be less beholden to special interests than the entrenched LDP, and a change of government was vital to maintain true democracy in Japan. On 10 August, Katsuya Okada, the leader of the DPJ, said that he would resign if the DPJ failed to take over the government, paralleling Koizumi's stated intention.

In domestic policy, the ruling bloc and the DPJ differed little; both concurred in the need to seek small government in general by cutting public works spending and reducing government employees, in contrast to the views of other, smaller parties. Additionally, they did not deny the need for a future increase of the consumption tax and revocation of temporary tax cuts in order to improve the financial health of the government, then considered the worst among any developed country and nearing wartime levels, and to cover the rising social security costs due to Japan's aging and declining population. The DPJ leadership even admitted that, if they won the control of the government, they would not revert Koizumi's four-year-long reforms but redo them more vigorously and thoroughly.

Outside Japan, there was much speculation about how the election could change foreign relations, since foreign policy constituted one of the major differences between the LDP and the DPJ. The LDP's Koizumi was notable for his foreign policies supportive of U.S. President George W. Bush. In particular, the administration faithfully supported the Iraq War, sending JSDF troops to Iraq in spite of public opposition and the country's pacifist constitution. Moreover, the relationship between Japan and China deteriorated in early 2005, when Koizumi and other conservative Japanese politicians angered China through their visits to the Yasukuni Shrine, amongst other actions. In contrast, Okada, the leader of the main opposition DPJ, said he would pull the troops out of Iraq by December 2005 if he won the government. He also pledged that he would not visit Yasukuni Shrine; this could noticeably improve foreign relations with South Korea and China. However, in Japan, foreign policy issues had drawn almost no attention during the campaign.

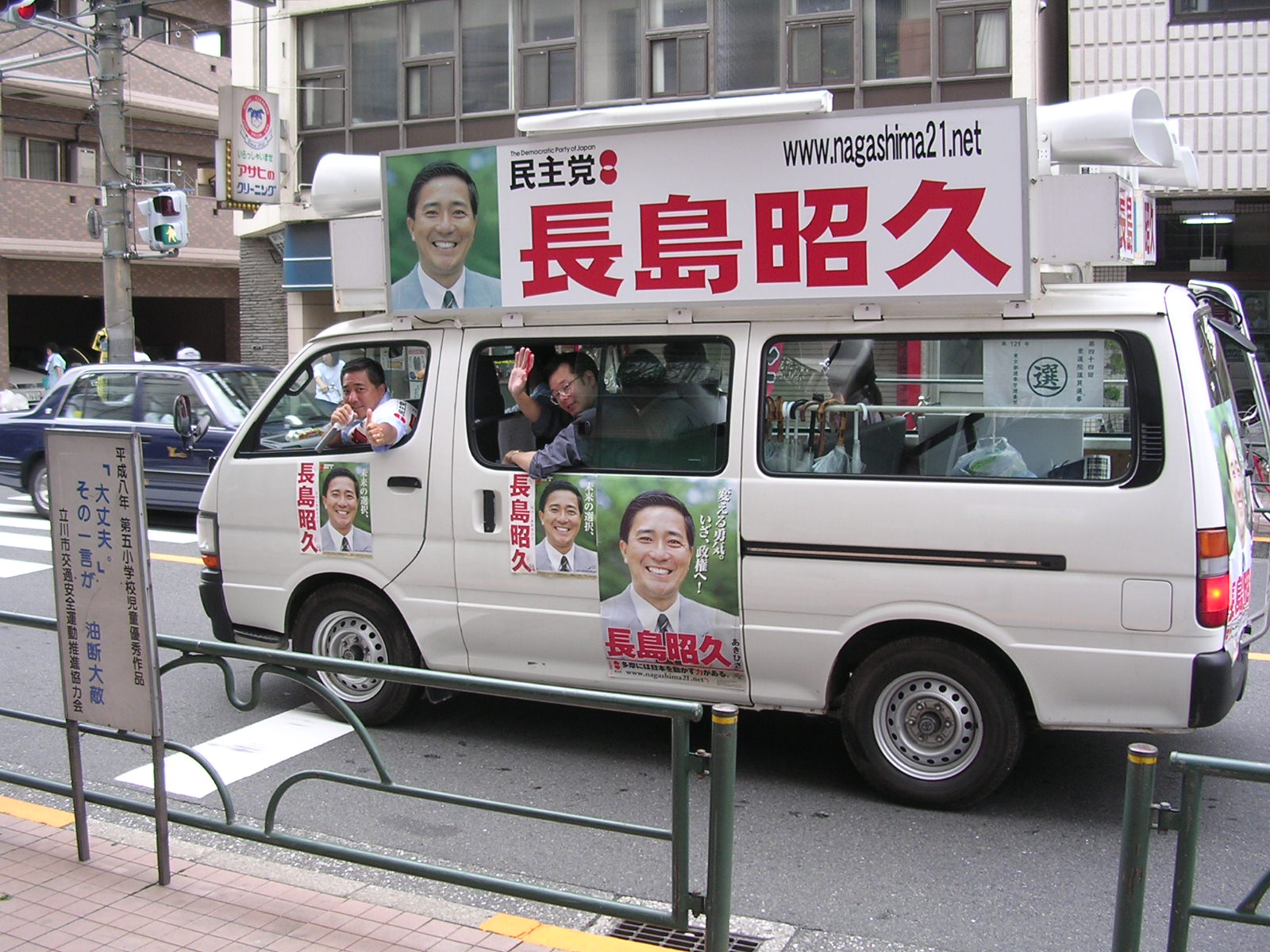
DPJ candidate Akihisa Nagashima (who failed to retain his constituency of Tokyo 21st district) in his campaign bus.

Koizumi maintained, as he had pledged before calling the election, a position that he would not give official party endorsement to 37 members of his party who voted against the postal bills; that is, they were not allowed to run as members of the party. To compensate for the disadvantages that non-party members suffered under the current election law (jp:公職選挙法), four LDP rebels, including Shizuka Kamei, announced on 17 August their formation of a new party, the People's New Party, to contest the elections. Four other LDP rebels followed suit days after, forming New Party Japan (not to be confused with the Japan New Party of Morihiro Hosokawa) with a popular Nagano governor Yasuo Tanaka as head. However, most rebels did not join the new parties, preferring to run as independents so as not to sever their ties with local LDP organizations.

The formation of the new parties, which were largely seen as necessary for the sole purpose of the election campaign, took place as Koizumi and his party's leadership were actively recruiting candidates to run in single-member districts against the rebels, and were pressuring local organizations to back the new candidates. New LDP candidates include celebrities, bureaucrats, and local politicians, and several rebels exited the race rather than run against their own party. Among the most publicized candidates was maverick businessman Takafumi Horie, who ran as an independent (with tacit LDP backing) against Kamei in Hiroshima's 6th District, a hot battleground in the last election between the then LDP's Kamei and a DPJ candidate.

== Opinion polls ==
Pre-election polls had been consistently showing the LDP's solid lead, especially among independent voters in urban areas like Tokyo and other big cities nationwide where its main opposition the DPJ had had a main support base. Newspaper surveys predicted a big victory for the LDP, which could lead the DPJ, young and short on unity, to disintegrate. Election analysts, however, warned that few LDP candidates were enjoying comfortable leads, and there was still a large number of undecided voters who went for the DPJ in the last election, thus the election results were far from being set.

== Results ==
Constituency Cartogram

The actual election results closely matched those predicted by most polls, despite experts' predictions to the contrary. Election results gave the governing coalition 327 seats, more than a two-thirds majority in the lower house. In general, the LDP roughly held its own in rural areas, retaking about half the seats held by rebels, but holding steady or even falling slightly against other parties. In urban areas the LDP had a devastating victory, reducing the DPJ from twelve single member constituencies to one in Tokyo, from nine to two in Osaka and from eight to zero in Kanagawa. The so-called 'assassin' candidates recruited by the LDP to stand against the disendorsed party rebels met with mixed success. Although 20 were elected, only 9 of these managed to defeat rebels in single-seat constituencies, with the remaining 11 elected by proportional representation. 5 'assassins' failed to be elected. Another casualty was the prominent independent candidate Takafumi Horie, who was defeated by the LDP rebel Shizuka Kamei, now representing the People's New Party.

One of the biggest landslides in Japanese politics came as a great surprise to virtually everyone, from politicians in both government and opposition camps to political analysts and the general public to finally Junichiro Koizumi himself, who reiterated after the election that he just asked for a majority. In particular, the DPJ's catastrophic defeats in the capital area (namely Tokyo and Kanagawa) shocked the party's members with no clear strategy to reverse the trends in future elections, as well as the LDP leadership who were now concerned that the LDP might have won such a great victory that it could lead to a swing against the party in the future. Analysis of the votes shows that the degree to which the electorate shifted their votes from the LDP to the DPJ was not as considerable as the number of seats exchanged; the LDP won 47.8% of the total votes, up from 43.8%, while the DPJ collected the same percentage (36.4%) as it did in the last lower-house election two years ago. Indeed, New Kōmeitō even lost three seats despite winning more votes than ever. Political analysts attribute this discrepancy to, in addition to the historically high turnout (67.5%), the switch of the election system a decade ago from the traditional medium-sized constituency system to today's system that combines single-seat constituencies and multi-member constituencies elected by proportional representation. The irony is that it was Koizumi who was a vocal critic of the switch and the likes of Okada and Ichirō Ozawa, the DPJ's deputy leader, who departed from the LDP to make the switch in a bid to create a two-party system.

| Party | Proportional | | | Constituency | | | Total seats | +/– |
| Party | Votes | % | Seats | Votes | % | Seats | Total seats | +/– |
|---|---|---|---|---|---|---|---|---|
| Liberal Democratic Party | 25,887,798 | 38.18 | 77 | 32,518,390 | 47.77 | 219 | 296 | +54 |
| Democratic Party of Japan | 21,036,425 | 31.02 | 61 | 24,804,787 | 36.44 | 52 | 113 | −65 |
| New Komeito Party | 8,987,620 | 13.25 | 23 | 981,105 | 1.44 | 8 | 31 | −3 |
| Japanese Communist Party | 4,919,187 | 7.25 | 9 | 4,937,375 | 7.25 | 0 | 9 | 0 |
| Social Democratic Party | 3,719,522 | 5.49 | 6 | 996,008 | 1.46 | 1 | 7 | +1 |
| New Party Nippon | 1,643,506 | 2.42 | 1 | 137,172 | 0.20 | 0 | 1 | New |
| People's New Party | 1,183,073 | 1.74 | 2 | 432,679 | 0.64 | 2 | 4 | New |
| New Party Daichi | 433,938 | 0.64 | 1 | 16,698 | 0.02 | 0 | 1 | New |
| World Economic Community Party | | | | 1,557 | 0.00 | 0 | 0 | 0 |
| Independents | | | | 3,240,522 | 4.76 | 18 | 18 | +7 |
| Total | 67,811,069 | 100.00 | 180 | 68,066,293 | 100.00 | 300 | 480 | 0 |
| Valid votes | 67,811,069 | 97.53 | | 68,066,293 | 97.90 | | | |
| Invalid/blank votes | 1,717,357 | 2.47 | | 1,458,340 | 2.10 | | | |
| Total votes | 69,528,426 | 100.00 | | 69,524,633 | 100.00 | | | |
| Registered voters/turnout | 103,067,966 | 67.46 | | 102,985,213 | 67.51 | | | |
Source: Election Resources, IPU

=== By prefecture ===
| Prefecture | Total seats | Seats won | | | | | |
| Prefecture | Total seats | LDP | DPJ | NKP | PNP | SDP | Ind. |
|---|---|---|---|---|---|---|---|
| Aichi | 15 | 9 | 6 | | | | |
| Akita | 3 | 1 | 1 | | | | 1 |
| Aomori | 4 | 4 | | | | | |
| Chiba | 13 | 12 | 1 | | | | |
| Ehime | 4 | 4 | | | | | |
| Fukui | 3 | 3 | | | | | |
| Fukuoka | 11 | 9 | 1 | | | | 1 |
| Fukushima | 5 | 3 | 2 | | | | |
| Gifu | 5 | 3 | | | | | 2 |
| Gunma | 5 | 5 | | | | | |
| Hiroshima | 7 | 6 | | | 1 | | |
| Hokkaido | 12 | 4 | 8 | | | | |
| Hyōgo | 12 | 10 | | 2 | | | |
| Ibaraki | 7 | 5 | 1 | | | | 1 |
| Ishikawa | 3 | 3 | | | | | |
| Iwate | 4 | 1 | 3 | | | | |
| Kagawa | 3 | 3 | | | | | |
| Kagoshima | 5 | 3 | | | | | 2 |
| Kanagawa | 18 | 16 | | 1 | | | 1 |
| Kōchi | 3 | 3 | | | | | |
| Kumamoto | 5 | 4 | 1 | | | | |
| Kyoto | 6 | 3 | 3 | | | | |
| Mie | 5 | 3 | 2 | | | | |
| Miyagi | 6 | 5 | 1 | | | | |
| Miyazaki | 3 | 1 | | | | | 2 |
| Nagano | 5 | 3 | 2 | | | | |
| Nagasaki | 4 | 3 | 1 | | | | |
| Nara | 4 | 3 | 1 | | | | |
| Niigata | 6 | 2 | 3 | | | | 1 |
| Ōita | 3 | 2 | 1 | | | | |
| Okayama | 5 | 2 | 2 | | | | 1 |
| Okinawa | 4 | 2 | | | | 1 | 1 |
| Osaka | 19 | 13 | 2 | 4 | | | |
| Saga | 3 | 1 | | | | | 2 |
| Saitama | 15 | 12 | 3 | | | | |
| Shiga | 4 | 2 | 2 | | | | |
| Shimane | 2 | 2 | | | | | |
| Shizuoka | 8 | 6 | 2 | | | | |
| Tochigi | 5 | 5 | | | | | |
| Tokushima | 3 | 1 | 1 | | | | 1 |
| Tokyo | 25 | 23 | 1 | 1 | | | |
| Tottori | 2 | 2 | | | | | |
| Toyama | 3 | 2 | | | 1 | | |
| Wakayama | 3 | 3 | | | | | |
| Yamagata | 3 | 3 | | | | | |
| Yamaguchi | 4 | 4 | | | | | |
| Yamanashi | 3 | | 1 | | | | 2 |
| Total | 300 | 219 | 52 | 8 | 2 | 1 | 18 |

=== By PR block ===
| PR block | Total seats | Seats won | | | | | | | |
| PR block | Total seats | LDP | DPJ | NKP | JCP | SDP | PNP | NPN | NPD |
|---|---|---|---|---|---|---|---|---|---|
| Chūgoku | 11 | 5 | 3 | 2 | | | 1 | | |
| Hokkaido | 8 | 3 | 3 | 1 | | | | | 1 |
| Hokuriku–Shinetsu | 11 | 5 | 4 | 1 | | | 1 | | |
| Kinki (Kansai) | 29 | 11 | 9 | 4 | 3 | 1 | | 1 | |
| Kyushu | 21 | 9 | 7 | 3 | 1 | 1 | | | |
| Northern Kanto | 20 | 9 | 7 | 2 | 1 | 1 | | | |
| Shikoku | 6 | 3 | 2 | 1 | | | | | |
| Southern Kanto | 22 | 10 | 7 | 3 | 1 | 1 | | | |
| Tohoku | 14 | 6 | 5 | 1 | 1 | 1 | | | |
| Tōkai | 21 | 9 | 8 | 3 | 1 | | | | |
| Tokyo | 17 | 7 | 6 | 2 | 1 | 1 | | | |
| Total | 180 | 77 | 61 | 23 | 9 | 6 | 2 | 1 | 1 |
