= Kyushu proportional representation block =

Japanese House of Representatives constituency

Kyushu Proportional Representation Block
- Parliamentary constituency for the Japanese House of Representatives
- Map of House of Representatives proportional blocks, with the Kyūshū block highlighted
- Prefectures: Fukuoka, Saga, Nagasaki, Kumamoto, Ōita, Miyazaki, Kagoshima, and Okinawa
- Electorate: 11,563,252 (2026)

Current constituency
- Created: 1994
- Number of members: 20

The Kyushu proportional representation block (九州比例ブロック, Kyūshū hirei burokku) is one of eleven proportional representation (PR) blocks for the House of Representatives in the Diet of Japan. It consists of the Kyushu region and Okinawa Prefecture, and consists of the prefectures of Fukuoka, Saga, Nagasaki, Kumamoto, Ōita, Miyazaki, Kagoshima, and Okinawa. Proportional voting blocks were first introduced in the 1996 General Election. The block elects 20 members to the House of Representatives.

== Results timeline ==
=== Vote share ===
Party	1996	2000	2003	2005	2009	2012	2014	2017	2021	2024	2026
LDP	35.62	31.38	36.52	37.07	29.17	29.91	34.32	33.81	35.69	28.50	39.86
NFP	28.23										
DPJ (Note: 1996 DP)	10.75	20.31	31.44	29.42	38.10	14.89	16.19				
SDP	10.15	13.22	8.84	7.81	5.95	4.51	5.26	4.30	3.51	3.40	2.25
JCP	9.65	8.20	6.25	5.80	5.27	5.06	9.13	6.54	5.80	4.66	3.34
NPS	1.53										
Komeito		14.42	16.95	15.95	15.19	15.64	17.72	15.82	16.50	14.56	
LP		9.27									
PNP				3.95	2.27	1.06					
Your					3.37	6.37					
Ishin (Note: 2012 JRP, 2014 JIP)						18.17	12.97	4.30	8.57	6.47	5.93
TPJ						3.91					
PLP							1.80				
KnT								18.11			
CDP								16.34	20.08	20.34	
DPFP									4.43	9.57	8.00
Reiwa									3.87	7.81	3.28
Sanseitō										4.69	8.23
CRA											18.72
Mirai											5.95
CPJ											2.40
Others	4.07 (Note: LL 2.34, NSP 1.73)	3.20			0.67 (Note: HRP 0.67)	0.48 (Note: HRP 0.48)	2.59 (Note: Generations 1.95, HRP 0.64)	0.78 (Note: HRP 0.78)	1.56 (Note: NHK 1.56)		2.04 (Note: Genyu 2.04)
Turnout		64.79	61.88	68.06	69.98	58.10	50.91	55.20	54.89	52.25	55.47

=== Seat distribution ===
Election	Distribution	Seats
1996		23
2000		21
2003		21
2005		21
2009		21
2012		21
2014		21
2017		20
2021		20
2024		20
2026		20

== Election results ==
=== 2026 ===
2026 results in the Kyushu PR block
Party	Votes	Swing	%	Seats	+/–
Liberal Democratic Party (LDP)	2,516,333	39.86	▲11.36	10	▲3
Centrist Reform Alliance (CRA) (Note: Swings compared to CDP and Komeito)	1,181,743	18.72	▼16.18	4	▼3
Sanseitō	519,904	8.23	▲3.54	2	▲1
Democratic Party For the People (DPFP)	505,129	8.00	▼1.57	2	0
Team Mirai	375,395	5.95	New	1	New
Japan Innovation Party (Ishin)	374,428	5.93	▼0.54	1	0
Japanese Communist Party (JCP)	210,751	3.34	▼1.32	0	▼1
Reiwa Shinsengumi (Reiwa)	207,317	3.28	▼4.53	0	▼1
Conservative Party of Japan (CPJ)	151,773	2.40	New	0	New
Social Democratic Party (SDP)	142,166	2.25	▼1.15	0	0
Tax Cuts Japan and Yukoku Alliance (Genyu)	128,713	2.04	New	0	New
Total	6,313,652	100.00		20	
Invalid votes	100,370	1.56			
Turnout	6,414,022	55.47	▲3.22		
Registered voters	11,563,252				

=== 2024 ===
2024 results in the Kyushu PR block
Party	Votes	Swing	%	Seats	+/–
Liberal Democratic Party (LDP)	1,682,815	28.50	▼7.19	7	▼1
Constitutional Democratic Party of Japan (CDP)	1,200,921	20.34	▲0.25	4	0
Komeito	859,912	14.56	▼1.94	3	▼1
Democratic Party For the People (DPFP)	564,910	9.57	▲5.13	2	▲1
Reiwa Shinsengumi (Reiwa)	461,425	7.81	▲3.95	1	▲1
Japan Innovation Party (Ishin)	382,034	6.47	▼2.10	1	▼1
Sanseitō	277,201	4.69	New	1	New
Japanese Communist Party (JCP)	275,408	4.66	▼1.13	1	0
Social Democratic Party (SDP)	200,694	3.40	▼0.11	0	0
Total	5,905,320	100.00		20	
Invalid votes	180,578	2.97			
Turnout	6,085,898	52.25	▼2.63		
Registered voters	11,646,738				

=== 2021 ===
2021 results in the Kyushu PR block
Party	Votes	Swing	%	Seats	+/–
Liberal Democratic Party (LDP)	2,250,966	35.69	▲1.88	8	▲1
Constitutional Democratic Party of Japan (CDP)	1,266,801	20.08	▲3.74	4	▲1
Komeito	1,040,756	16.50	▲0.68	4	▲1
Japan Innovation Party (Ishin)	540,338	8.57	▲4.27	2	▲1
Japanese Communist Party (JCP)	365,658	5.80	▼0.74	1	0
Democratic Party For the People (DPFP)	279,509	4.43	New	1	New
Reiwa Shinsengumi (Reiwa)	243,824	3.87	New	0	New
Social Democratic Party (SDP)	221,221	3.51	▼0.80	0	▼1
NHK Party	98,506	1.56	New	0	New
Total	6,307,579	100.00		20	
Invalid votes	192,385	2.96			
Turnout	6,499,964	54.89	▼0.31		
Registered voters	11,842,373				

=== 2017 ===
2017 results in the Kyushu PR block
Party	Votes	Swing	%	Seats	+/–
Liberal Democratic Party (LDP)	2,181,754	33.81	▼0.52	7	▼1
Kibō no Tō	1,168,708	18.11	New	4	New
Constitutional Democratic Party of Japan (CDP)	1,054,589	16.34	New	3	New
Komeito	1,021,227	15.82	▼1.90	3	▼1
Japanese Communist Party (JCP)	421,962	6.54	▼2.59	1	▼1
Social Democratic Party (SDP)	277,704	4.30	▼0.96	1	0
Japan Innovation Party (Ishin)	277,203	4.30	▼8.67	1	▼2
Happiness Realization Party (HRP)	50,293	0.78	▲0.14	0	0
Total	6,453,440	100.00		20	▼1
Invalid votes	169,564	2.56			
Turnout	6,623,004	55.20	▲4.29		
Registered voters	11,998,955				

=== 2014 ===
2014 results in the Kyushu PR block
Party	Votes	Swing	%	Seats	+/–
Liberal Democratic Party (LDP)	2,001,264	34.32	▲4.41	8	▲1
Komeito	1,033,424	17.72	▲2.08	4	▲1
Democratic Party of Japan (DPJ)	944,093	16.19	▲1.30	3	0
Japan Innovation Party (JIP)	756,029	12.97	▼5.20	3	▼1
Japanese Communist Party (JCP)	532,454	9.13	▲4.07	2	▲1
Social Democratic Party (SDP)	306,935	5.26	▲0.76	1	0
Party for Future Generations	113,965	1.95	New	0	New
People's Life Party	104,895	1.80	New	0	New
Happiness Realization Party (HRP)	37,299	0.64	▲0.16	0	0
Total	5,830,358	100.00		21	
Invalid votes	185,580	3.08			
Turnout	6,015,938	50.91	▼7.18		
Registered voters	11,816,652				

=== 2012 ===
2012 results in the Kyushu PR block
Party	Votes	Swing	%	Seats	+/–
Liberal Democratic Party (LDP)	1,995,521	29.91	▲0.75	7	0
Japan Restoration Party (JRP)	1,211,996	18.17	New	4	New
Komeito	1,043,528	15.64	▲0.45	3	0
Democratic Party of Japan (DPJ)	993,317	14.89	▼23.21	3	▼6
Your Party	424,892	6.37	▲3.00	1	▲1
Japanese Communist Party (JCP)	337,573	5.06	▼0.21	1	0
Social Democratic Party (SDP)	300,708	4.51	▼1.45	1	0
Tomorrow Party of Japan (TPJ)	260,994	3.91	New	1	New
People's New Party (PNP)	70,847	1.06	▼1.21	0	0
Happiness Realization Party (HRP)	31,848	0.48	▼0.20	0	0
Total	6,671,224	100.00		21	
Invalid votes	206,639	3.00			
Turnout	6,877,863	58.10	▼11.89		
Registered voters	11,838,968				

=== 2009 ===
2009 results in the Kyushu PR block
Party	Votes	Swing	%	Seats	+/–
Democratic Party of Japan (DPJ)	3,073,035	38.10	▲8.68	9	▲2
Liberal Democratic Party (LDP)	2,352,372	29.17	▼7.91	7	▼2
Komeito	1,225,505	15.19	▼0.75	3	0
Social Democratic Party (SDP)	480,257	5.95	▼1.85	1	0
Japanese Communist Party (JCP)	425,276	5.27	▼0.53	1	0
Your Party	271,466	3.37	New	0	New
People's New Party (PNP)	183,242	2.27	▼1.68	0	0
Happiness Realization Party (HRP)	54,321	0.67	New	0	New
Total	8,065,474	100.00		21	
Invalid votes	220,641	2.66			
Turnout	8,286,115	69.98	▲1.92		
Registered voters	11,840,425				

=== 2005 ===
2005 results in the Kyushu PR block
Party	Votes	Swing	%	Seats	+/–
Liberal Democratic Party (LDP)	2,883,048	37.07	▲0.55	9	▲1
Democratic Party of Japan (DPJ)	2,287,753	29.42	▼2.02	7	0
Komeito	1,240,007	15.95	▼1.00	3	0
Social Democratic Party (SDP)	607,008	7.81	▼1.04	1	▼1
Japanese Communist Party (JCP)	451,158	5.80	▼0.45	1	0
People's New Party (PNP)	307,454	3.95	New	0	New
Total	7,776,428	100.00		21	
Invalid votes	266,191	3.31			
Turnout	8,042,619	68.06	▲6.18		
Registered voters	11,816,278				

=== 2003 ===
2003 results in the Kyushu PR block
Party	Votes	Swing	%	Seats	+/–
Liberal Democratic Party (LDP)	2,535,278	36.52	▲5.14	8	▲1
Democratic Party of Japan (DPJ)	2,182,400	31.44	▲11.13	7	▲3
Komeito	1,176,391	16.95	▲2.53	3	0
Social Democratic Party (SDP)	613,875	8.84	▼4.38	2	▼1
Japanese Communist Party (JCP)	434,099	6.25	▼1.94	1	▼1
Total	6,942,043	100.00		21	
Invalid votes	319,483	4.40			
Turnout	7,261,526	61.88	▼2.91		
Registered voters	11,734,044				

=== 2000 ===
2000 results in the Kyushu PR block
Party	Votes	Swing	%	Seats	+/–
Liberal Democratic Party (LDP)	2,217,127	31.38	▼4.23	7	▼2
Democratic Party of Japan (DPJ)	1,434,888	20.31	▲9.56	4	▲1
Komeito	1,018,478	14.42	New	3	New
Social Democratic Party (SDP)	933,821	13.22	▲3.07	3	▲1
Liberal Party (LP)	655,110	9.27	New	2	New
Japanese Communist Party (JCP)	579,020	8.20	▼1.46	2	0
Liberal League (LL)	226,131	3.20	New	0	New
Total	7,064,575	100.00		21	▼2
Invalid votes	408,136	5.46			
Turnout	7,472,711	64.79			
Registered voters	11,532,983				

=== 1996 ===
1996 results in the Kyushu PR block
Party	Votes	%	Seats
Liberal Democratic Party (LDP)	2,342,094	35.62	9
New Frontier Party (NFP)	1,856,406	28.23	7
Democratic Party (DP)	707,011	10.75	3
Social Democratic Party (SDP)	667,244	10.15	2
Japanese Communist Party (JCP)	634,728	9.65	2
Liberal League (LL)	154,071	2.34	0
New Socialist Party (NSP)	113,428	1.73	0
New Party Sakigake (NPS)	100,523	1.53	0
Total	6,575,505	100.00	23
