= Representatives elected in the 2017 Japanese general election =

This is a list of Representatives elected to the House of Representatives of Japan at the 2017 general election, held on 22 October 2017, for the Forty-Eight election period of the House of Representatives beginning with the 184th session of the National Diet of Japan.

== Terms ==
(as of July 2019)

Start of term	End of term	Remarks
22 October 2017	October 2021 (potentially)	Term of members elected in the 48th House of Representatives general election
22 October 2017	September 2018	Denny Tamaki (Okinawa 3) resigned to stand in Okinawa gubernatorial election
22 October 2017	11 November 2018	Death of Hiroyuki Sonoda (Kyūshū proportional)
22 October 2017	26 December 2018	Death of Tomokatsu Kitagawa (Osaka 12)
22 October 2017	January 2019	Sei Ōmi (Tōkai proportional) resigned to stand in Anjō City mayoral election
22 October 2017	January 2019	Shinji Tarutoko (Kinki proportional) resigned to stand in House of Representatives Osaka 12 by-election
22 October 2017	March 2019	Kentarō Motomura (S. Kantō proportional) resigned to stand in Sagamihara City mayoral election
22 October 2017	March 2019	Tsuyoshi Tabata (Tōkai proportional) resigned over allegations of sexual misconduct
22 October 2017	9 April 2019	Takeshi Miyamoto (Kinki proportional) forfeited seat by becoming candidate in the House of Representatives Osaka 12 by-election
22 October 2017	4 July 2019	Yasushi Miura (Chūgoku proportional) forfeited seat by becoming candidate in the 25th House of Councillors regular election
November 2018	October 2021 (potentially)	Masahisa Miyazaki, Kyūshū proportional LDP list runner-up to replace Hiroyuki Sonoda
February 2019	October 2021 (potentially)	Sumio Mabuchi, Kinki proportional Kibō list runner-up to replace Shinji Tarutoko
February 2019	October 2021 (potentially)	Hajime Yatagawa, S. Kantō proportional Kibō list runner-up to replace Kentarō Motomura
February 2019	October 2021 (potentially)	Shūhei Aoyama, Tōkai proportional LDP list runner-up to replace Sei Ōmi
March 2019	October 2021 (potentially)	Takeru Yoshikawa, Tōkai proportional LDP list runner-up to replace Tsuyoshi Tabata
April 2019	October 2021 (potentially)	Term of members elected in the 48th House of Representatives by-elections in Osaka 12 and Okinawa 3
17 April 2019	October 2021 (potentially)	Tadashi Shimizu, Kinki proportional JCP list runner-up to replace Takeshi Miyamoto
11 July 2019	October 2021 (potentially)	Shōgo Azemoto, Chūgoku proportional LDP list runner-up to replace Yasushi Miura

== Composition ==
Party	Seats
Liberal Democratic Party (Japan)	284
Constitutional Democratic Party of Japan	55
Kibō no Tō	50
Komeito	29
Japanese Communist Party	12
Nippon Ishin no Kai	11
Social Democratic Party	2
Independents	22
Total	465
Source: MIAC

== Representatives ==
Constituency	Elected Members	Elected Party	Notes
=== Hokkaido === 12 single-member and 8 proportional representation seats.
Hokkaido-1st	Daiki Michishita	Constitutional Democratic	
Hokkaido-2nd	Takamori Yoshikawa	Liberal Democratic	
Hokkaidō–3rd	Satoshi Arai	Constitutional Democratic	
Hokkaidō–4th	Hiroyuki Nakamura	Liberal Democratic	
Hokkaidō–5th	Yoshiaki Wada	Liberal Democratic	
Hokkaidō–6th	Takahiro Sasaki	Constitutional Democratic	
Hokkaidō–7th	Yoshitaka Itō	Liberal Democratic	
Hokkaidō–8th	Seiji Osaka	Constitutional Democratic	
Hokkaidō–9th	Manabu Horii	Liberal Democratic	
Hokkaidō–10th	Hisashi Inatsu	Kōmeitō	
Hokkaidō–11th	Kaori Ishikawa	Constitutional Democratic	
Hokkaidō–12th	Arata Takebe	Liberal Democratic	
==== Hokkaido Block ====
Hokkaidō block	Hidemichi Satō	Kōmeitō	
Hokkaidō block	Hiroshi Kamiya	Constitutional Democratic	
Hokkaidō block	Maki Ikeda	Constitutional Democratic	
Hokkaidō block	Hiranao Honda	Constitutional Democratic	
Hokkaidō block	Tatsumaru Yamaoka	DPFP	
Hokkaidō block	Kōichi Watanabe	Liberal Democratic	
Hokkaidō block	Takako Suzuki	Liberal Democratic	
Hokkaidō block	Toshimitsu Funahashi	Liberal Democratic	
=== Tōhoku === 25 single-member and 14 proportional representation seats.
==== Aomori Prefecture ====
Aomori–1st	Jun Tsushima	Liberal Democratic	
Aomori–2nd	Tadamori Ōshima	Liberal Democratic	
Aomori–3rd	Jiro Kimura	Liberal Democratic	
==== Iwate Prefecture ====
Iwate–1st	Takeshi Shina	DPFP	
Iwate–2nd	Shun'ichi Suzuki	Liberal Democratic	
Iwate–3rd	Ichirō Ozawa	DPFP	
==== Miyagi Prefecture ====
Miyagi–1st	Tōru Doi	Liberal Democratic	
Miyagi–2nd	Ken'ya Akiba	Liberal Democratic	
Miyagi–3rd	Akihiro Nishimura	Liberal Democratic	
Miyagi–4th	Shintarō Itō	Liberal Democratic	
Miyagi–5th	Jun Azumi	Constitutional Democratic	
Miyagi–6th	Itsunori Onodera	Liberal Democratic	
==== Akita Prefecture ====
Akita–1st	Hiroyuki Togashi	Liberal Democratic	
Akita–2nd	Katsutoshi Kaneda	Liberal Democratic	
Akita–3rd	Nobuhide Minorikawa	Liberal Democratic	
==== Yamagata Prefecture ====
Yamagata–1st	Toshiaki Endō	Liberal Democratic	
Yamagata–2nd	Norikazu Suzuki	Liberal Democratic	
Yamagata–3rd	Ayuko Kato	Liberal Democratic	
==== Fukushima Prefecture ====
Fukushima–1st	Emi Kaneko	Constitutional Democratic	
Fukushima–2nd	Takumi Nemoto	Liberal Democratic	
Fukushima–3rd	Kōichirō Genba	RGSSP	
Fukushima–4th	Ichirō Kanke	Liberal Democratic	
Fukushima–5th	Masayoshi Yoshino	Liberal Democratic	
==== Tohoku Block ====
Tōhoku block	Hinako Takahashi	Liberal Democratic	
Tōhoku block	Yukiko Akutsu	Constitutional Democratic	
Tōhoku block	Akinori Eto	Liberal Democratic	
Tōhoku block	Takashi Fujiwara	Liberal Democratic	
Tōhoku block	Yoshihisa Inoue	Kōmeitō	
Tōhoku block	Yoshitami Kameoka	Liberal Democratic	
Tōhoku block	Takashi Midorikawa	DPFP	
Tōhoku block	Shinji Oguma	DPFP	
Tōhoku block	Akiko Okamoto	Constitution Democratic	
Tōhoku block	Chizuko Takahashi	JCP	
Tōhoku block	Manabu Terata	Constitutional Democratic	
Tōhoku block	Kentaro Uesugi	Liberal Democratic	
Tōhoku block	Makoto Yamazaki	Constitutional Democratic	
Tōhoku block			
=== North Kanto (Kita Kanto) === 32 single-member and 19 proportional representation seats.
==== Ibaraki Prefecture ====
Ibaraki–1st	Yoshinari Tadokoro	Liberal Democratic	
Ibaraki–2nd	Fukushirō Nukaga	Liberal Democratic	
Ibaraki–3rd	Yasuhiro Hanashi	Liberal Democratic	
Ibaraki–4th	Hiroshi Kajiyama	Liberal Democratic	
Ibaraki–5th	Akimasa Ishikawa	Liberal Democratic	
Ibaraki–6th	Ayano Kinimitsu	Liberal Democratic	
Ibaraki–7th	Kishirō Nakamura	Constitutional Democratic	
==== Tochigi Prefecture ====
Tochigi–1st	Hajime Funada	Liberal Democratic	
Tochigi–2nd	Akio Fukuda	Constitutional Democratic	
Tochigi–3rd	Kazuo Yana	Liberal Democratic	
Tochigi–4th	Tsutomu Satō	Liberal Democratic	
Tochigi–5th	Toshimitsu Motegi	Liberal Democratic	
==== Gunma Prefecture ====
Gunma–1st	Asako Omi	Liberal Democratic	
Gunma–2nd	Toshirō Ino	Liberal Democratic	
Gunma–3rd	Hiroyoshi Sasagawa	Liberal Democratic	
Gunma–4th	Tatsuo Fukuda	Liberal Democratic	
Gunma–5th	Yūko Obuchi	Liberal Democratic	
==== Saitama Prefecture ====
Saitama–1st	Hideki Murai	Liberal Democratic	
Saitama–2nd	Yoshitaka Shindō	Liberal Democratic	
Saitama–3rd	Hitoshi Kikawada	Liberal Democratic	
Saitama–4th	Yashushi Hosaka	Liberal Democratic	
Saitama–5th	Yukio Edano	Constitutional Democratic	
Saitama–6th	Atsushi Oshima	DPFP	
Saitama–7th	Saichi Kamiyama	Liberal Democratic	
Saitama–8th	Masahiko Shibayama	Liberal Democratic	
Saitama–9th	Taku Ōtsuka	Liberal Democratic	
Saitama–10th	Taimei Yamaguchi	Liberal Democratic	
Saitama–11th	Ryūji Koizumi	Liberal Democratic	
Saitama–12th	Atsushi Nonaka	Liberal Democratic	
Saitama–13th	Shinako Tsuchiya	Liberal Democratic	
Saitama–14th	Hiromi Mitsubayashi	Liberal Democratic	
Saitama–15th	Ryōsei Tanaka	Liberal Democratic	
==== Kita Kanto Block ====
Kita Kantō block	Kazuyuki Nakane	Liberal Democratic	
Kita Kantō block	Kaichi Hasegawa	Constitutional Democratic	
Kita Kantō block	Toshikazu Morita	DPFP	
Kita Kantō block	Keiko Nagaoka	Liberal Democratic	
Kita Kantō block	Keiichi Ishii	Kōmeitō	
Kita Kantō block	Hideki Makihara	Liberal Democratic	
Kita Kantō block	Yuriko Yamakawa	Constitutional Democratic	
Kita Kantō block	Yamato Aoyama	DPFP	
Kita Kantō block	Yasutaka Nakasone	Liberal Democratic	
Kita Kantō block	Tetsuya Shiokawa	JCP	
Kita Kantō block	Kenin Horikoshi	Constitutional Democratic	
Kita Kantō block	Akio Sato	Liberal Democratic	
Kita Kantō block	Mitsunori Okamoto	Kōmeitō	
Kita Kantō block	Satoshi Asano	DPFP	
Kita Kantō block	Kimichiko Hyakutake	Liberal Democratic	
Kita Kantō block	Masako Ogawara	Constitutional Democratic	
Kita Kantō block	Yasuka Komiyama	DPFP	
Kita Kantō block	Yutaka Kanda	Liberal Democratic	
Kita Kantō block	Rentaro Takagi	Constitutional Democratic	
=== South Kanto (Minami Kanto) === 33 single-member and 22 proportional representation seats.
==== Chiba Prefecture ====
Chiba-1st	Hiroaki Kadoyama	Liberal Democratic	
Chiba-2nd	Takayuki Kobayashi	Liberal Democratic	
Chiba-3rd	Hirokazu Matsuno	Liberal Democratic	
Chiba-4th	Yoshihiko Noda	RGSSP	
Chiba-5th	Kentaro Sonoura	Liberal Democratic	
Chiba-6th	Hiromichi Watanabe	Liberal Democratic	
Chiba-7th	Ken Saito	Liberal Democratic	
Chiba-8th	Yoshitaka Sakurada	Liberal Democratic	
Chiba-9th	Masatoshi Akimoto	Liberal Democratic	
Chiba-10th	Motoo Hayashi	Liberal Democratic	
Chiba-11th	Eisuke Mori	Liberal Democratic	
Chiba-12th	Yasukazu Hamada	Liberal Democratic	
Chiba-13th	Takaki Shirasuka	Liberal Democratic	
==== Kanagawa Prefecture ====
Kanagawa-1st	Jun Matsumoto	Liberal Democratic	
Kanagawa-2nd	Yoshihide Suga	Liberal Democratic	
Kanagawa-3rd	Hachiro Okonogi	Liberal Democratic	
Kanagawa-4th	Yuki Waseda	Constitutional Democratic	
Kanagawa-5th	Manabu Sakai	Liberal Democratic	
Kanagawa-6th	Yochiro Aoyagi	Constitutional Democratic	
Kanagawa-7th	Keisuke Suzuki	Liberal Democratic	
Kanagawa-8th	Kenji Eda	Constitutional Democratic	
Kanagawa-9th	Ryu Hirofumi	Future Japan	
Kanagawa-10th	Kazunori Tanaka	Liberal Democratic	
Kanagawa-11th	Shinjiro Koizumi	Liberal Democratic	
Kanagawa-12th	Tomoko Abe	Constitutional Democratic	
Kanagawa-13th	Akira Amari	Liberal Democratic	
Kanagawa-14th	Jiro Akama	Liberal Democratic	
Kanagawa-15th	Taro Kono	Liberal Democratic	
Kanagawa-16th	Hiroyuki Yoshie	Liberal Democratic	
Kanagawa-17th	Karen Makishima	Liberal Democratic	
Kanagawa-18th	Daishiro Yamagiwa	Liberal Democratic	
==== Yamanashi Prefecture ====
Yamanashi-1st	Katsuhito Nakajima	RGSSP	
Yamanashi-2nd	Noriko Horiuchi	Liberal Democratic	
=== Tokyo === 25 single-member and 17 proportional representation seats.
Tokyo–1st	Banri Kaieda	Constitutional Democratic	
Tokyo–2nd	Kiyoto Tsuji	Liberal Democratic	
Tokyo–3rd	Hirotaka Ishihara	Liberal Democratic	
Tokyo–4th	Masaaki Taira	Liberal Democratic	
Tokyo–5th	Kenji Wakamiya	Liberal Democratic	
Tokyo–6th	Takayuki Ochiai	Constitutional Democratic	
Tokyo–7th	Akira Nagatsuma	Constitutional Democratic	
Tokyo–8th	Nobuteru Ishihara	Liberal Democratic	
Tokyo–9th	Isshu Sugawara	Liberal Democratic	
Tokyo–10th	Hayato Suzuki	Liberal Democratic	
Tokyo–11th	Hakubun Shimomura	Liberal Democratic	
Tokyo–12th	Akihiro Ota	Komeito	
Tokyo–13th	Ichiro Kamoshita	Liberal Democratic	
Tokyo–14th	Midori Matsushima	Liberal Democratic	
Tokyo–15th	Tsukasa Akimoto	Liberal Democratic	
Tokyo–16th	Hideo Onishi	Liberal Democratic	
Tokyo–17th	Katsuei Hirasawa	Liberal Democratic	
Tokyo–18th	Naoto Kan	Constitutional Democratic	
Tokyo–19th	Yohei Matsumoto	Liberal Democratic	
Tokyo–20th	Seiji Kihara	Liberal Democratic	
Tokyo–21st	Akihisa Nagashima	Future Japan	
Tokyo–22nd	Tatsuya Ito	Liberal Democratic	
Tokyo–23rd	Masanobu Ogura	Liberal Democratic	
Tokyo–24th	Koichi Hagiuda	Liberal Democratic	
Tokyo–25th	Shinji Inoue	Liberal Democratic	
=== Hokuriku Shin'etsu === 19 single-member and 11 proportional representation seats.
==== Niigata Prefecture ====
Niigata–1st	Chinami Nishimura	Constitutional Democratic	
Niigata–2nd	Eiichiro Washio	Liberal Democratic	
Niigata–3rd	Takahiro Kuroiwa	Constitutional Democratic	
Niigata–4th	Makiko Kikuta	Constitutional Democratic	
Niigata–5th	Hirohiko Izumida	Liberal Democratic	
Niigata–6th	Shūichi Takatori	Liberal Democratic	
==== Toyama Prefecture ====
Toyama–1st	Hiroaki Tabata	Liberal Democratic	
Toyama–2nd	Mitsuhiro Miyakoshi	Liberal Democratic	
Toyama–3rd	Keiichirō Tachibana	Liberal Democratic	
==== Ishikawa Prefecture ====
Ishikawa–1st	Hiroshi Hase	Liberal Democratic	
Ishikawa–2nd	Hajime Sasaki	Liberal Democratic	
Ishikawa–3rd	Shoji Nishida	Liberal Democratic	
==== Fukui Prefecture ====
Fukui–1st	Tomomi Inada	Liberal Democratic	
Fukui–2nd	Tsuyoshi Takagi	Liberal Democratic	
==== Nagano Prefecture ====
Nagano–1st	Takashi Shinohara	DPFP	
Nagano–2nd	Mitsu Shimojo	DPFP	
Nagano–3rd	Yosei Ide	RGSSP	
Nagano–4th	Shigeyuki Gotō	Liberal Democratic	
Nagano–5th	Ichirō Miyashita	Liberal Democratic	
=== Tokai === 32 single-member and 21 proportional representation seats.
==== Gifu Prefecture ====
Gifu–1st	Seiko Noda	Liberal Democratic	
Gifu–2nd	Yasufumi Tanahashi	Liberal Democratic	
Gifu–3rd	Yōji Mutō	Liberal Democratic	
Gifu–4th	Shumpei Kaneko	Liberal Democratic	
Gifu–5th	Keiji Furuya	Liberal Democratic	
==== Shizuoka Prefecture ====
Shizuoka–1st	Yōko Kamikawa	Liberal Democratic	
Shizuoka–2nd	Tatsunori Ibayashi	Liberal Democratic	
Shizuoka–3rd	Hiroyuki Miyazawa	Liberal Democratic	
Shizuoka–4th	Yoshio Mochizuki	Liberal Democratic	
Shizuoka–5th	Gōshi Hosono	Independent	
Shizuoka–6th	Shū Watanabe	DPFP	
Shizuoka–7th	Minoru Kiuchi	Liberal Democratic	
Shizuoka–8th	Ryū Shionoya	Liberal Democratic	
==== Aichi Prefecture ====
Aichi–1st	Hiromichi Kumada	Liberal Democratic	
Aichi–2nd	Motohisa Furukawa	DPFP	
Aichi–3rd	Shoichi Kondo	Constitutional Democratic	
Aichi–4th	Shōzō Kudō	Liberal Democratic	
Aichi–5th	Hirotaka Akamatsu	Independent	
Aichi–6th	Hideki Niwa	Liberal Democratic	
Aichi–7th	Shiori Yamao	Constitutional Democratic	
Aichi–8th	Tadahiko Itō	Liberal Democratic	
Aichi–9th	Yasumasa Nagasaka	Liberal Democratic	
Aichi–10th	Tetsuma Esaki	Liberal Democratic	
Aichi–11th	Shin'ichirō Furumoto	DPFP	
Aichi–12th	Kazuhiko Shigetoku	RGSSP	
Aichi–13th	Kenusuke Onishi	DPFP	
Aichi–14th	Sōichirō Imaeda	Liberal Democratic	
Aichi–15th	Yukinori Nemoto	Liberal Democratic	
==== Mie Prefecture ====
Mie–1st	Norihisa Tamura	Liberal Democratic	
Mie–2nd	Masaharu Nakagawa	Constitutional Democratic	
Mie–3rd	Katsuya Okada	RGSSP	
Mie–4th	Norio Mitsuya	Liberal Democratic	
=== Kinki === 47 single-member and 28 proportional representation seats.
==== Shiga Prefecture ====
Shiga–1st	Toshitaka Ōoka	Liberal Democratic	
Shiga–2nd	Ken'ichirō Ueno	Liberal Democratic	
Shiga–3rd	Nobuhide Takemura	Liberal Democratic	
Shiga–4th	Hiroo Kotera	Liberal Democratic	
==== Kyoto Prefecture ====
Kyōto–1st	Bunmei Ibuki	Liberal Democratic	
Kyōto–2nd	Seiji Maehara	DPFP	
Kyōto–3rd	Kenta Izumi	DPFP	
Kyōto–4th	Hideyuki Tanaka	Liberal Democratic	
Kyōto–5th	Taro Honda	Liberal Democratic	
Kyōto–6th	Hiroshi Ando	Liberal Democratic	
==== Osaka Prefecture ====
Ōsaka–1st	Hiroyuki Onishi	Liberal Democratic	
Ōsaka–2nd	Akira Satō	Liberal Democratic	
Ōsaka–3rd	Shigeki Satō	Kōmeitō	
Ōsaka–4th	Yasuhide Nakayama	Liberal Democratic	
Ōsaka–5th	Tōru Kunishige	Kōmeitō	
Ōsaka–6th	Shin'ichi Isa	Kōmeitō	
Ōsaka–7th	Naomi Tokashiki	Liberal Democratic	
Ōsaka–8th	Takahasi Otsuka	Liberal Democratic	
Ōsaka–9th	Kenji Harada	Liberal Democratic	
Ōsaka–10th	Kiyomi Tsujimoto	Constitutional Democratic	
Ōsaka–11th	Hirofumi Hirano	DPFP	
Ōsaka–12th	Fumitake Fujita	Ishin	
Ōsaka–13th	Kōichi Munekiyo	Liberal Democratic	
Ōsaka–14th	Takashi Nagao	Liberal Democratic	
Ōsaka–15th	Naokazu Takemoto	Liberal Democratic	
Ōsaka–16th	Kazuo Kitagawa	Kōmeitō	
Ōsaka–17th	Nobuyuki Baba	Ishin	
Ōsaka–18th	Takashi Endō	Ishin	
Ōsaka–19th	Hodaka Maruyama	Ishin	
==== Hyogo Prefecture ====
Hyōgo–1st	Masatoshi Moriyama	Liberal Democratic	
Hyōgo–2nd	Kazuyoshi Akaba	Kōmeitō	
Hyōgo–3rd	Yoshihiro Seki	Liberal Democratic	
Hyōgo–4th	Hisayuki Fujii	Liberal Democratic	
Hyōgo–5th	Kōichi Tani	Liberal Democratic	
Hyōgo–6th	Masaki Ōgushi	Liberal Democratic	
Hyōgo–7th	Kenji Yamada	Liberal Democratic	
Hyōgo–8th	Hiromasa Nakano	Kōmeitō	
Hyōgo–9th	Yasutoshi Nishimura	Liberal Democratic	
Hyōgo–10th	Kisaburō Tokai	Liberal Democratic	
Hyōgo–11th	Takeaki Matsumoto	Liberal Democratic	
Hyōgo–12th	Tsuyoshi Yamaguchi	Liberal Democratic	
==== Nara Prefecture ====
Nara–1st	Shigeki Kobayashi	Liberal Democratic	
Nara–2nd	Sanae Takaichi	Liberal Democratic	
Nara–3rd	Taido Tanose	Liberal Democratic	
==== Wakayama Prefecture ====
Wakayama–1st	Shūhei Kishimoto	DPFP	
Wakayama–2nd	Masatoshi Ishida	Liberal Democratic	
Wakayama–3rd	Toshihiro Nikai	Liberal Democratic	
=== Chugoku === 20 single-member and 11 proportional representation seats.
==== Tottori Prefecture ====
Tottori–1st	Shigeru Ishiba	Liberal Democratic	
Tottori–2nd	Ryosei Akazawa	Liberal Democratic	
==== Shimane Prefecture ====
Shimane-1st	Hiroyuki Hosoda	Liberal Democratic	
Shimane-2nd	Wataru Takeshita	Liberal Democratic	
==== Okayama Prefecture ====
Okayama-1st	Ichiro Aisawa	Liberal Democratic	
Okayama-2nd	Takashi Yamashita	Liberal Democratic	
Okayama-3rd	Toshiko Abe	Liberal Democratic	
Okayama-4th	Gaku Hashimoto	Liberal Democratic	
Okayama-5th	Katsunobu Kato	Liberal Democratic	
==== Hiroshima Prefecture ====
Hiroshima-1st	Fumio Kishida	Liberal Democratic	
Hiroshima-2nd	Hiroshi Hiraguchi	Liberal Democratic	
Hiroshima-3rd	Katsuyuki Kawai	Liberal Democratic	
Hiroshima-4th	Masayoshi Shintani	Liberal Democratic	
Hiroshima-5th	Minoru Terada	Liberal Democratic	
Hiroshima-6th	Koji Sato	DPFP	
Hiroshima-7th	Fumiaki Kobayashi	Liberal Democratic	
==== Yamaguchi Prefecture ====
Yamaguchi-1st	Masahiro Komura	Liberal Democratic	
Yamaguchi-2nd	Nobuo Kishi	Liberal Democratic	
Yamaguchi-3rd	Takeo Kawamura	Liberal Democratic	
Yamaguchi-4th	Shinzo Abe	Liberal Democratic	
==== Chugoku Block ====
Chūgoku block	Toshifumi Kojima	Liberal Democratic	
Chūgoku block	Mio Sugita	Liberal Democratic	
Chūgoku block	Akiko Kamei	Constitutional Democratic	
Chūgoku block	Michiyoshi Yunoki	Independent	
Chūgoku block	Tetsuo Saitō	Kōmeitō	
Chūgoku block	Michitaka Ikeda	Liberal Democratic	
Chūgoku block	Keiichi Furuta	Liberal Democratic	
Chūgoku block	Takashi Takai	Constitutional Democratic	
Chūgoku block	Keisuke Tsumura	DPFJ	
Chūgoku block	Keigo Masuya	Liberal Democratic	
Chūgoku block	Keigo Masuya	Kōmeitō	
=== Shikoku === 11 single-member and 6 proportional representation seats.
==== Tokushima Prefecture ====
Tokushima-1st	Masazumi Gotoda	Liberal Democratic	
Tokushima-2nd	Sunichi Yamaguchi	Liberal Democratic	
==== Kagawa Prefecture ====
Kagawa-1st	Takuya Hirai	Liberal Democratic	
Kagawa-2nd	Yuchiro Tamaki	DPFP	
Kagawa-3rd	Keitaro Ono	Liberal Democratic	
==== Ehime Prefecture ====
Ehime-1st	Yasuhisa Shiozaki	Liberal Democratic	
Ehime-2nd	Seiichiro Murakami	Liberal Democratic	
Ehime-3rd	Yoichi Shiraishi	DPFP	
Ehime-4th	Koichi Yamamoto	Liberal Democratic	
==== Kochi Prefecture ====
Kochi-1st	Gen Nakatani	Liberal Democratic	
Kochi-2nd	Hajime Hirota	RGSSP	
==== Shikoku Block ====
Shikoku block	Teru Fukui	Liberal Democratic	
Shikoku block	Junya Ogawa	Constitutional Democratic	
Shikoku block	Mamoru Fukuyama	Liberal Democratic	
Shikoku block	Noritoshi Ishida	Kōmeitō	
Shikoku block	Norio Takeuchi	Constitutional Democratic	
Shikoku block	Yuji Yamamoto	Liberal Democratic	
=== Kyushu === 35 single-member and 20 proportional representation seats.
==== Fukuoka Prefecture ====
Fukuoka–1st	Takahiro Inoue	Liberal Democratic	
Fukuoka–2nd	Makoto Oniki	Liberal Democratic	
Fukuoka–3rd	Atsushi Koga	Liberal Democratic	
Fukuoka–4th	Hideki Miyauchi	Liberal Democratic	
Fukuoka–5th	Yoshiaki Harada	Liberal Democratic	
Fukuoka–6th	Jiro Hatoyama	Liberal Democratic	
Fukuoka–7th	Satoshi Fujimaru	Liberal Democratic	
Fukuoka–8th	Tarō Asō	Liberal Democratic	
Fukuoka–9th	Asahiko Mihara	Liberal Democratic	
Fukuoka–10th	Kōzō Yamamoto	Liberal Democratic	
Fukuoka–11th	Ryōta Takeda	Liberal Democratic	
==== Saga Prefecture ====
Saga–1st	Kazuhira Haraguchi	DPFP	
Saga–2nd	Hiroshi Ogushi	Constitutional Democratic	
==== Nagasaki Prefecture ====
Nagasaki–1st	Hideki Nishioka	DPFP	
Nagasaki–2nd	Kanji Katō	Liberal Democratic	
Nagasaki–3rd	Yaichi Tanigawa	Liberal Democratic	
Nagasaki–4th	Seigo Kitamura	Liberal Democratic	
==== Kumamoto Prefecture ====
Kumamoto–1st	Minoru Kihara	Liberal Democratic	
Kumamoto–2nd	Takeshi Noda	Liberal Democratic	
Kumamoto–3rd	Tetsushi Sakamoto	Liberal Democratic	
Kumamoto–4th	Yasushi Kaneko	Liberal Democratic	
==== Oita Prefecture ====
Ōita–1st	Yōichi Anami	Liberal Democratic	
Ōita–2nd	Seishirō Etō	Liberal Democratic	
Ōita–3rd	Takeshi Iwaya	Liberal Democratic	
==== Miyazaki Prefecture ====
Miyazaki–1st	Shunsuke Takei	Liberal Democratic	
Miyazaki–2nd	Taku Etō	Liberal Democratic	
Miyazaki–3rd	Yoshihisa Furukawa	Liberal Democratic	
==== Kagoshima Prefecture ====
Kagoshima–1st	Hiroshi Kawauchi	Constitutional Democratic	
Kagoshima–2nd	Masuo Kaneko	Liberal Democratic	
Kagoshima–3rd	Yasuhiro Ozata	Liberal Democratic	
Kagoshima–4th	Hiroshi Moriyama	Liberal Democratic	
==== Okinawa Prefecture ====
Okinawa–1st	Seiken Akamine	JCP	
Okinawa–2nd	Kantoku Teruya	Social Democratic	
Okinawa–3rd	Tomohiro Yara	DPFP	
Okinawa–4th	Kōsaburō Nishime	Liberal Democratic	
==== Kyushu Block ====
Kyūshū block	Yasushi Furukawa	Liberal Democratic	
Kyūshū block	Masahiro Imamura	Liberal Democratic	
Kyūshū block	Yasuyuki Eda	Kōmeitō	
Kyūshū block	Masahisa Miyazaki	Liberal Democratic	
Kyūshū block	Shuji Inatomi	DPFP	
Kyūshū block	Kazuchiko Iwata	Liberal Democratic	
Kyūshū block	Takashi Kii	DPFP	
Kyūshū block	Masakazu Hamachi	Kōmeitō	
Kyūshū block	Takuma Miyaji	Liberal Democratic	
Kyūshū block	Masayoshi Yagami	Constitutional Democratic	
Kyūshū block	Mikio Shimoji	Ishin	
Kyūshū block	Takaaki Tamura	JCP	
Kyūshū block	Konosuke Kokuba	Liberal Democratic	
Kyūshū block	Tsutomu Tomioka	Liberal Democratic	
Kyūshū block	Nariaki Nakayama	Kibō	
Kyūshū block	Kiyohiko Toyama	Kōmeitō	
Kyūshū block	Koichi Yamauchi	Constitutional Democratic	
Kyūshū block	Katsuhiko Yokomitsu	Constitutional Democratic	
Kyūshū block	Hajime Yoshikawa	Social Democratic	
Kyūshū block	Shuji Kira	DPFP	
