= Hokkaido 7th district (1996–2003) =

Former Japan House of Representatives constituency

Hokkaido 7th District
- Former constituency for the Japanese House of Representatives
- Proportional District: Hokkaido

Former constituency
- Created: 1996
- Abolished: 2003
- Seats: One
- Created from: Hokkaido 2nd district (1947–1993)
- Replaced by: Hokkaido 6th, 10th, and 12th districts
- Subprefectures: Kamikawa, Rumoi and Sōya Subprefectures

The Hokkaidō 7th district (北海道第7区, Hokkaidō Dai Nana-ku) was a single-member constituency of the House of Representatives in the Diet of Japan. It was located in Japan's northernmost prefecture Hokkaidō and represented the subprefectures of Kamikawa, Rumoi and Sōya. Its only representative was Liberal Democratic Party member Eiko Kaneta, who was elected to the multi-member 2nd district (the predecessor of the 7th district) in 1993

The district was abolished in a 2002 redistricting and reapportionment, with Kamikawa becoming part of the 6th district, Rumoi becoming part of the 10th district, and Sōya becoming part of the 12th district. The then-13th district was renamed to become the current 7th district. As the 6th district was represented by fellow Liberal Democratic member Hiroshi Imazu, Kaneta contested the Hokkaido proportional representation block in the 2003 general election.

== List of representatives ==
Representative	Party	Dates	Notes
Hokkaidō 7th district
Eikō Kaneta	LDP	1996–2003	Re-elected in the Hokkaidō PR block in 2003

== Election results ==
2000: Hokkaidō 7th district
Party	Candidate	Votes	%	±%
LDP	Eikō Kaneta (Incumbent)	94,290	49.2	
Democratic	Yasuki Sakuraba	85,553	44.6	
JCP	Masatada Mashiko	11,889	6.2	

1996: Hokkaidō 7th district
Party	Candidate	Votes	%	±%
LDP	Eikō Kaneta	65,955	34.4	
Democratic	Yasuki Sakuraba	62,549	32.6	
New Frontier	Yoshiteru Uekusa	52,300	27.2	
JCP	Masatada Mashiko	11,149	5.8	
Turnout		196,227	71.46	
