= Haruo Okada =

Japanese politician

- 岡田 春夫
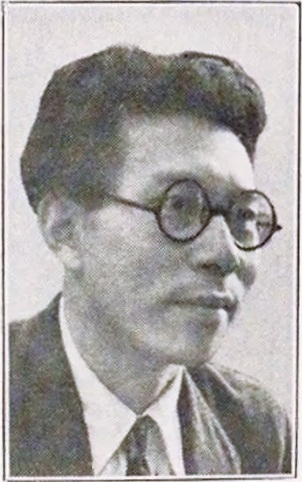
- Okada in 1948

Vice Speaker of the House of Representatives
- In office 30 October 1979 – 28 November 1983
- Speaker: Hirokichi Nadao; Hajime Fukuda
- Preceded by: Shōichi Miyake
- Succeeded by: Seiichi Katsumata

Member of the House of Representatives
- In office 11 December 1972 – 2 June 1986
- Preceded by: Masaki Ino
- Succeeded by: Kenji Nakazawa
- Constituency: Hokkaido 4th
- In office 11 April 1946 – 2 December 1969
- Preceded by: Constituency established
- Succeeded by: Masaki Ino
- Constituency: Hokkaido 1st (1946–1947); Hokkaido 4th (1947–1969)

Personal details
- Born: 14 June 1914 Bibai, Hokkaido, Japan
- Died: 6 November 1991 (aged 77)
- Party: Socialist
- Other political affiliations: LFP (1948–1957)
- Education: Otaru Higher Commercial School

Haruo Okada (Japanese: 岡田春夫; 14 June 1914 – 6 November 1991) was a Japanese politician. He was a member of the Socialist Party of Japan. He was a member of the House of Representatives of Japan for the multi-member constituency Hokkaido's 4th district. He was a recipient of the Order of the Rising Sun. He served alongside Seiichi Ikehata, Tatsuo Takahashi and Shōichi Watanabe.
