= Kōichi Watanabe =

Japanese politician (1957–2026)

- 渡辺 孝一
- Official portrait, 2023

Member of the House of Representatives
- In office 9 February 2026 – 17 September 2026
- Preceded by: Multi-member district
- Constituency: Hokkaido PR
- In office 17 December 2012 – 9 October 2024
- Preceded by: Multi-member district
- Succeeded by: Multi-member district
- Constituency: Hokkaido PR

Mayor of Iwamizawa
- In office October 2002 – 31 July 2012
- Preceded by: Kuniyuki Nose
- Succeeded by: Satoru Matsuno

Personal details
- Born: 25 November 1957 Kita, Tokyo, Japan
- Died: 17 September 2026 (aged 68) Iwamizawa, Hokkaido, Japan
- Party: Liberal Democratic
- Relatives: Shōichi Watanabe (father)
- Education: Health Sciences University of Hokkaido

Kōichi Watanabe (渡辺 孝一, Watanabe Kōichi; 25 November 1957 – 17 September 2026) was a Japanese politician of the Liberal Democratic Party, who served as a member of the House of Representatives.

== Early years ==
Watanabe was born in Kita, Tokyo on 25 November 1957. He graduated from the Health Sciences University of Hokkaido.

After graduating from university, he worked as an associate at a dental clinic before opening his own practice in Iwamizawa in 1991. In 1996, he was appointed President of the Iwamizawa Junior Chamber, and he also served as the Chairperson of both the Iwamizawa PTA Federation and the Sorachi PTA Federation.

== Political career ==
In 2002, Watanabe ran for the mayor of Iwamizawa and won. He served the office until 2012.

In the 2012 general election, Watanabe announced his candidacy for the Hokkaido 10th district, a seat his father, Shōichi Watanabe, had previously contested. However, Hisashi Inatsu, a member of the House of Representatives (Komeito), also declared his candidacy for the Hokkaido 10th. Due to the electoral cooperation with Komeito, the LDP initially decided not to field its own candidate in the Hokkaido 10th. This decision met with strong opposition from Watanabe and the Hokkaido Legislative Assembly members supporting him, who considered running him as an independent. Following negotiations led by the LDP headquarters, a compromise was reached: in exchange for allowing Inatsu to run in the Hokkaido 10th, the party agreed to place Watanabe at the top of the LDP's party list of Hokkaido PR. As a result of the election, he won a seat in the PR.

In the 2014 general election, Watanabe won a seat in the PR.

In the 2017 general election, Watanabe won a seat in the PR.

In September 2019, Watanabe was appointed to the Parliamentary Secretary for Defense and the Parliamentary Vice-Minister of Cabinet Office in the Fourth Abe second reshuffled cabinet.

In October 2021, Watanabe was appointed to the Parliamentary Vice-Minister for Internal Affairs and Communications in the First Kishida cabinet.

In the 2021 general election, Watanabe won a seat in the PR. After the election, he was re-appointed to the Parliamentary Vice-Minister for Internal Affairs and Communications in the Second Kishida cabinet.

In September 2023, Watanabe was appointed to the State Minister for Internal Affairs and Communications in the Second Kishida second reshuffled cabinet.

In the 2024 LDP presidential election, Watanabe endorsed Yoshimasa Hayashi as a recommender.

In the 2024 general election, Watanabe lost re-election because he was placed low on the party list.

On 3 May 2025, Watanabe applied for the open recruitment of the head of the LDP's Hokkaido 10th branch and tried to run in Hokkaido 10th. After the Komeito left the coalition, the LDP nominated Watanabe as a Hokkaido 10th candidate.

In the 2026 general election, Watanabe lost to CRA's Hiroshi Kamiya only by 21 votes and won a seat in the PR.

=== Allegations of Public Offices Election Act Violations ===
In June 2018, it was reported that the "LDP Hokkaido House of Representatives Proportional Representation 1st Branch," a political organization headed by Watanabe, spent approximately 239,000 yen on a bus tour for supporters. The expenditures included costs for food and beverages, shrimp for souvenirs, and bus rental fees. There were nine participants, each paying a fee of 7,000 yen. While the political funds-expenditure report recorded a total income of 63,000 yen from these fees, the tour resulted in a deficit of approximately 176,000 yen. Following the publication of the report, media outlets pointed out that this discrepancy could potentially violate the Public Offices Election Act, which prohibits donations to voters within an individual's constituency.

== Death ==
After being hospitalized for five days, he died on 17 September 2026, at the age of 68.
