= Hidemichi Satō =

Japanese politician

- 佐藤 英道
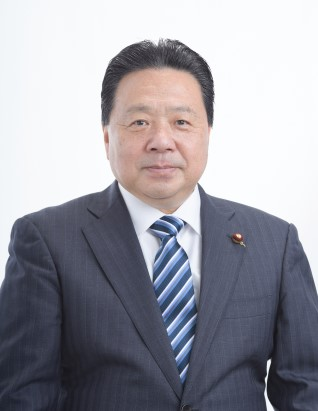
- Official portrait, 2021

Member of the House of Representatives
- Incumbent
- Assumed office 17 December 2012
- Preceded by: Multi-member district
- Constituency: Hokkaido PR

Member of the Hokkaido Legislative Assembly
- In office April 1995 – 16 November 2012
- Preceded by: Multi-member district
- Succeeded by: Multi-member district
- Constituency: Kita ward, Sapporo

Personal details
- Born: 26 September 1960 (age 66) Natori, Miyagi Prefecture, Japan
- Party: Komeito (until 2026, 2026–present)
- Other political affiliations: CRA (2026)
- Education: Sōka University
- Website: Hidemichi Satō website

Hidemichi Satō (佐藤 英道, Satō Hidemichi; born 26 September 1960) is a Japanese politician of the Centrist Reform Alliance, who serves as a member of the House of Representatives.

== Early years ==
On 26 September 1960, Satō was born in Natori, Miyagi Prefecture. After graduating from Sōka University's Faculty of Economics and graduate school of Economics, he entered Komei Shimbun.

== Political career ==
In 1995, Satō ran for the Hokkaido Legislative Assembly and won.

On 16 November 2012, Satō resigned from the Hokkaido Legislative Assembly to run in the general election. In the 2012 general election, he run in the Hokkaido PR block and won a seat.

In September 2014, he was appointed to the Parliamentary Secretary for Agriculture, Forestry and Fisheries in the Second Abe reshuffled cabinet.

In the 2014 general election, he won a seat in the PR. After the election, he was re-appointed to the Parliamentary Secretary for Agriculture, Forestry and Fisheries in the Third Abe cabinet.

In October 2015, he was also re-appointed to the Parliamentary Secretary for Agriculture, Forestry and Fisheries in the Third Abe first reshuffled cabinet.

In the 2017 general election, he won a seat in the PR.

In the 2021 general election, he won a seat in the PR. After the election, he was appointed to the State Minister of Health, Labour and Welfare and State Minister of Cabinet Office in the Second Kishida cabinet.

In the 2024 general election, he won a seat in the PR.

On 9 September 2025, Satō held a press conference in Sapporo and announced his candidacy for the Hokkaido 4th district in the next general election. Following this, Hiroyuki Nakamura, a LDP member of the House of Representatives who had been active in the Hokkaido 4th, would move to the Hokkaido PR block. Previously, the LDP and Komeito had maintained an electoral cooperation agreement in Hokkaido 10th district, where Komeito's Hisashi Inatsu had been the candidate. However, that agreement was scrapped after Inatsu lost his seat to the CDP's Hiroshi Kamiya.

Because Komeito eventually dissolved its coalition with the LDP, Satō announced on October 28 that he would abandon his candidacy for the Hokkaido 4th, citing he would not get the support from the LDP.

In January 2026, he joined the Centrist Reform Alliance, a new party established by the CDP and Komeito. In the 2026 general election, he won a seat in the PR.
