= Taimei Yamaguchi =

Japanese politician

- 山口 泰明
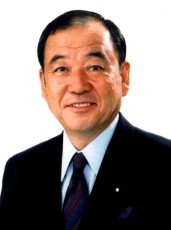
- Official portrait, 2005

Member of the House of Representatives
- In office 18 December 2012 – 14 October 2021
- Preceded by: Tetsuhisa Matsuzaki
- Succeeded by: Susumu Yamaguchi
- Constituency: Saitama 10th
- In office 20 October 1996 – 21 July 2009
- Preceded by: Constituency established
- Succeeded by: Tetsuhisa Matsuzaki
- Constituency: Saitama 10th

Personal details
- Born: 10 November 1948 (age 77) Kawajima, Saitama, Japan
- Party: Liberal Democratic
- Children: Susumu Yamaguchi
- Education: Nihon University

Taimei Yamaguchi (山口 泰明, Yamaguchi Taimei; born 10 November 1948) is a former Japanese politician of the Liberal Democratic Party, who served as a member of the House of Representatives in the Diet (national legislature). A native of Hiki District, Saitama and graduate of Nihon University, he was elected to the House of Representatives for the first time in 1996.

House of Representatives (Japan)
| Preceded by Yoshiaki Harada | Chair, Committee on Foreign Affairs of the House of Representatives; 2006–2007 | Succeeded by Katsuei Hirasawa |
Political offices
| Preceded by Yoshio Mochizuki, Yoshitaka Sakurada, Kaori Maruya | Parliamentary Vice-Minister for Foreign Affairs; 2001–2002; Served alongside: Toshio Kojima, Kaori Maruya | Succeeded by Kenshirō Matsunami, Masahiro Imamura, Kenichi Mizuno |
| Preceded by Akira Shichijō, Kōya Nishikawa, Takeshi Hayashida | State Minister of Cabinet Office; 2005–2006; Served alongside: Chiken Kakazu, Yoshitaka Sakurada | Succeeded by Katsuei Hirasawa, Yoshimi Watanabe, Yoshimasa Hayashi |
Party political offices
| Preceded by Kazunori Tanaka | Chief of the Organisation and Movement Headquarters, Liberal Democratic Party; 2015–2020 | Succeeded by Itsunori Onodera |
| Preceded by Hakubun Shimomura | Chairman of the Election Strategy Committee, Liberal Democratic Party; 2020–2021 | Succeeded by Toshiaki Endo |
