= Seiichi Ikehata =

Japanese politician (1929–2007)

- 池端 清一

Director-General of the National Land Agency
- In office 8 August 1995 – 11 January 1996
- Prime Minister: Tomiichi Murayama
- Preceded by: Kiyoshi Ozawa
- Succeeded by: Kazumi Suzuki

Member of the House of Representatives
- In office 23 June 1980 – 2 June 2000
- Preceded by: Tadashi Kodaira
- Succeeded by: Multi-member district
- Constituency: Hokkaido 4th (1980–1996); Hokkaido PR (1996–2000)
- In office 6 December 1976 – 7 September 1979
- Preceded by: Sozo Watanabe
- Succeeded by: Shōichi Watanabe
- Constituency: Hokkaido 4th

Personal details
- Born: 20 August 1929 Kushiro, Hokkaido, Japan
- Died: 28 February 2007 (aged 77) Sapporo, Hokkaido, Japan
- Party: Democratic
- Other political affiliations: JSP (1976–1996); SDP (1996); DP (1996–1998)
- Education: Waseda University

Seiichi Ikehata (池端 清一, Ikehata Seiichi; August 20, 1929 – February 28, 2007) was a Japanese politician from Kushiro, Hokkaido.

== Career ==
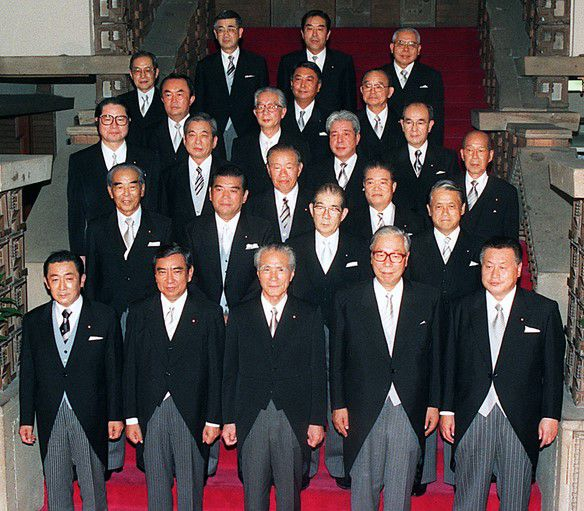
Ikehata with members of Murayama Reshuffled Cabinet (at the Prime Minister's Official Residence on August 8, 1995)

He was a member of the House of Representatives of Japan as a member of the multi-member Hokkaido's 4th district. He served alongside Yukio Hatoyama, Tatsuo Takahashi, Shōichi Watanabe and Tadamasa Kodaira.
