= Kozo Igarashi =

Japanese politician (1926–2013)

- 五十嵐 広三

Chief Cabinet Secretary
- In office 30 June 1994 – 8 August 1995
- Prime Minister: Tomiichi Murayama
- Preceded by: Hiroshi Kumagai
- Succeeded by: Koken Nosaka

Minister of Construction
- In office 9 August 1993 – 28 April 1994
- Prime Minister: Morihiro Hosokawa
- Preceded by: Kishirō Nakamura
- Succeeded by: Kōji Morimoto

Member of the House of Representatives
- In office 22 June 1980 – 27 September 1996
- Preceded by: Mitsugu Haga
- Succeeded by: Constituency abolished
- Constituency: Hokkaido 2nd

Mayor of Asahikawa
- In office 30 April 1963 – 30 September 1974
- Preceded by: Maeno Yozabukichi
- Succeeded by: Isamu Matsumoto

Personal details
- Born: 15 March 1926 Asahikawa, Hokkaido, Japan
- Died: 7 May 2013 (aged 87) Sapporo, Hokkaido, Japan
- Party: Socialist

Kozo Igarashi (五十嵐 広三, Igarashi Kōzō; 15 March 1926 – May 7, 2013) was a Japanese politician from Asahikawa, Hokkaido. He was the mayor of Asahikawa City from 1963 to 1974, member of the House of Representatives, construction minister in the Hosokawa Cabinet from 1993 to 1994, and chief Cabinet secretary in the government of Prime Minister Tomiichi Murayama from 1994 to 1995. In 1975 and 1979, Igarashi ran for governor of Hokkaidō as a united front candidate (JSP, JCP, Kōmeitō), and lost both elections to incumbent Naohiro Dōgakinai.

== Death ==
On May 7, 2013, he died of pneumonia at age 87.

House of Representatives (Japan)
Preceded by Four-member constituency	Representative for Hokkaidō 2nd district 1980-1996; Served alongside: Hiroshi Imazu and many others	Succeeded by District eliminated
