= Toshio Masuda =

Toshio Masuda may refer to:

- Toshio Masuda (director) (1927–2026), Japanese film director
- Toshio Masuda (composer) (born 1959), Japanese composer
- Toshio Masuda (politician) (born 1929), Japanese politician
