= Yoshio Hachiro =

Japanese politician (born 1948)

- 鉢呂 吉雄
- Official portrait, 2011

Minister of Economy, Trade and Industry
- In office 2 September 2011 – 11 September 2011
- Prime Minister: Yoshihiko Noda
- Preceded by: Banri Kaieda
- Succeeded by: Osamu Fujimura (acting); Yukio Edano

Member of the House of Councillors
- In office 26 July 2016 – 25 July 2022
- Preceded by: Seat established
- Succeeded by: Toshimitsu Funahashi
- Constituency: Hokkaido at-large

Member of the House of Representatives
- In office 10 November 2003 – 16 November 2012
- Preceded by: Shizuo Satō
- Succeeded by: Hiroyuki Nakamura
- Constituency: Hokkaido 4th
- In office 19 February 1990 – 27 March 2003
- Preceded by: Kazuo Okuno
- Succeeded by: Seiichi Kaneta
- Constituency: Hokkaido 3rd (1990–1996); Hokkaido 8th (1996–2003)

Personal details
- Born: 25 January 1948 (age 78) Shintotsukawa, Hokkaido, Japan
- Party: CDP (since 2018)
- Other political affiliations: Independent (before 1990); JSP (1990–1996); SDP (1996); DP 1996 (1996–1998); DPJ (1998–2016); DP 2016 (2016–2018)
- Education: Hokkaido University
- Website: Official website

Yoshio Hachiro (鉢呂 吉雄, Hachiro Yoshio; born 25 January 1948) is a former Japanese politician of the Constitutional Democratic Party who served as a member of the House of Councillors and the House of Representatives in the Diet (national legislature).

== Overview ==
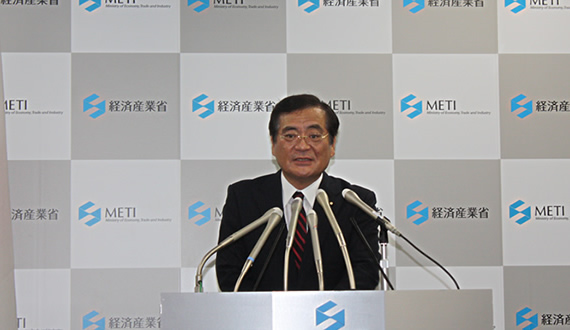
Hachiro after being inaugurated as the new Minister of Economy, Trade and Industry on 2 September 2011

A native of Kabato District, Hokkaidō and graduate of Hokkaido University, he was elected to the House of Representatives for the first time in 1990 as an independent. He later joined first the Japan Socialist Party and then the DPJ. In 2003 he left the Diet to run for governorship of Hokkaido, which was unsuccessful. In the same year he ran for the Hokkaido 4th district in the House of Representatives and was elected. In September 2011 he was appointed as Minister of Economy, Trade and Industry in the cabinet of newly appointed prime minister Yoshihiko Noda.

He resigned after being criticised for making controversial comments during his visit to the exclusion zone of Fukushima Daiichi nuclear disaster on 9 September. He compared the vicinity of the plant to a ghost town, and on the previous day, jokingly mimicked rubbing his jacket on a journalist while telling him "I'll give you radiation."

Hachiro lost re-election in the 2012 general election. He recontested his old seat in 2014, but narrowly lost to the incumbent MP. He ran for a Hokkaido seat in the 2016 House of Councillors election, successfully obtaining the third seat allocated for the prefecture. When the Democratic Party merged with the Party of Hope in May 2018 to form the Democratic Party for the People, Hachiro did not join the new party and moved the CDP instead.
