= Fumio Abe =

Japanese politician (1922–2006)

- 阿部 文男

Director-General of the Hokkaido Development Agency
- In office 10 August 1989 – 28 February 1990
- Prime Minister: Toshiki Kaifu
- Preceded by: Kichio Inoue
- Succeeded by: Shigetami Sunada

Director-General of the Okinawa Development Agency
- In office 10 August 1989 – 28 February 1990
- Prime Minister: Toshiki Kaifu
- Preceded by: Kichio Inoue
- Succeeded by: Shigetami Sunada

Member of the House of Representatives
- In office 10 December 1976 – 18 June 1993
- Preceded by: Takayuki Satō
- Succeeded by: Seiichi Kaneta
- Constituency: Hokkaido 3rd
- In office 28 December 1969 – 13 November 1972
- Preceded by: Hiroshi Yamauchi
- Succeeded by: Shōhei Tsukada
- Constituency: Hokkaido 3rd

Member of the Hokkaido Legislative Assembly
- In office 1963–1969
- Constituency: Hakodate City

Personal details
- Born: 23 June 1922 Higashine, Yamagata, Japan
- Died: 6 December 2006 (aged 84) Hakodate, Hokkaido, Japan
- Party: Liberal Democratic
- Education: Hokkaido University

Fumio Abe (阿部 文男, Abe Fumio; 23 June 1922 – 6 December 2006) was a politician in Japan's Liberal Democratic Party (LDP) who served as state minister for Hokkaido and Okinawa development agencies. Abe was not related to former Prime Minister Shinzo Abe, whose surname is pronounced identically but written using different characters (安倍).

== Career ==
Abe was first elected to the lower house in 1969. He was state minister for Okinawa and Hokkaido development agencies in 1989 in the cabinet of Toshiki Kaifu. Abe served as secretary general and treasurer of Kiichi Miyazawa's faction in the LDP until December 1991. Abe resigned from his post after newspaper reports of the alleged bribes. Abe retired from politics in 1993.

== Bribery scandal ==
Abe was arrested due to his involvement in a bribery scandal on 13 January 1992. In 1994, he was sentenced by the Tokyo District Court to three years in prison along with a fine. His appeal was rejected by the Tokyo High Court and the Supreme Court. However, he served no jail time because he was hospitalized with an illness.

== Death ==
Fumio Abe died of heart failure in Hakodate, Hokkaido, on 6 December 2006. He was 84.
