= Hokkaido 2nd district (1947–1993) =

Former Japan House of Representatives constituency

Hokkaidō 2nd District
- 北海道第2区
- Former constituency for the Japanese House of Representatives
- District: Hokkaidō

Former constituency
- Created: 1947
- Abolished: 1994
- Number of members: 4
- Replaced by: Hokkaido 7th

The Hokkaido 2nd District (Japanese: 北海道第2区, Hepburn: Hokkaidō dai-ni-ku) is a former constituency for the House of Representatives between the 1947 and 1993 elections. It was abolished following the 1994 electoral reform when Japan moved from single non-transferable vote to a parallel system.

Located in the prefecture (-dō) of Hokkaidō, prior to its dissolution, it consisted of the cities (-shi) of Asahikawa, Rumoi, Wakkanai, Shibetsu, Nayoro, Furano and all other municipalities in the subprefectures (-shichō) Kamikawa, Sōya and Rumoi. With the return to single-member districts in the 1990s electoral reform, the district became the 7th district. In 2003 the 7th district was abolished and the area that was once the 2nd district was divided amongst the 6th, 10th and 12th districts of Hokkaidō.

== List of representatives ==
Election	Elected 1st	2nd	3rd	4th
1947	Yōichi Kawaguchi (JFP)	Toshiaki Wada (JSP)	Hideyo Sasaki (DP)	Kōtarō Bandō (LP)
1949	Yōichi Kawaguchi (JFP)	Shinichi Tamaki (DLP)	Rokutarō Matsumoto (JFP)	Hideyo Sasaki (DLP)
1952	Shūtarō Matsūra (RP)	Hideyo Sasaki (LP)	Mitsugu Haga (LSP)	Shinichi Tamaki (LP)
1953	Mitsugu Haga (LSP)	Shūtarō Matsūra (RP)	Shinosuke Takeda (LP)	Shinichi Tamaki (LP)
1955	Shūtarō Matsūra (DP), (LDP)	Mitsugu Haga (LSP), (JSP)	Hideyo Sasaki (DP)	Tadayoshi Hayashi (DP), (LDP)
1958	Shūtarō Matsūra (DP), (LDP)	Mitsugu Haga (LSP), (JSP)	Yoshinori Yasui (JSP)	Tadayoshi Hayashi (DP), (LDP)
1960	Hideyo Sasaki (LDP)	Shūtarō Matsūra (LDP)	Mitsugu Haga (JSP)	Yoshinori Yasui (JSP)
1963	Hideyo Sasaki (LDP)	Shūtarō Matsūra (LDP)	Mitsugu Haga (JSP)	Yoshinori Yasui (JSP)
1967	Shūtarō Matsūra (LDP)	Hideyo Sasaki (LDP)	Yoshinori Yasui (JSP)	Mitsugu Haga (JSP)
1969	Shūtarō Matsūra (LDP)	Hideyo Sasaki (LDP)	Yoshinori Yasui (JSP)	Mitsugu Haga (JSP)
1972	Hideyo Sasaki (LDP)	Mitsugu Haga (JSP)	Yoshinori Yasui (JSP)	Shūtarō Matsūra (LDP)
1976	Masanori Kawata (LDP)	Mitsugu Haga (JSP)	Yoshinori Yasui (JSP)	Shikedoshi Murakami (LDP)
1979	Yoshiteru Uekusa (LDP)	Yoshinori Yasui (JSP)	Shikedoshi Murakami (LDP)	Mitsugu Haga (JSP)
1980	Masanori Kawata (LDP)	Kōzō Igarashi (JSP)	Yoshiteru Uekusa (LDP)	Yoshinori Yasui (JSP)
1983	Shikedoshi Murakami (LDP)	Yoshinori Yasui (JSP)	Kōzō Igarashi (JSP)	Yoshiteru Uekusa (LDP)
1986	Masanori Kawata (LDP)	Kōzō Igarashi (JSP)	Yoshinori Yasui (JSP)	Yoshiteru Uekusa (LDP)
1990	Hidenori Sasaki (JSP)	Kōzō Igarashi (JSP)	Hiroshi Imazu (LDP)	Yoshiteru Uekusa (LDP)
1993	Hiroshi Imazu (LDP)	Kōzō Igarashi (JSP)	Hidenori Sasaki (JSP)	Eikō Kaneta (LDP)

== Election results (incomplete) ==
=== Elections in the 1990s ===
1993: Hokkaido 2nd 4 members
Party	Candidate	Votes	%	±%
LDP	Hiroshi Imazu	84,315	22.1	▲3.4
Socialist	Kōzō Igarashi	75,902	19.9	▼0.1
Socialist	Hidenori Sasaki	70,582	18.5	▼7.1
LDP	Eikō Kaneta	68,593	17.9	▲5.4
LDP	Yoshiteru Uekusa	62,842	16.4	▼0.6
JCP	Hidenori Endō	20,059	5.2	▼1.1
Turnout			69.90	▼8.02

1990: Hokkaido 2nd 4 members
Party	Candidate	Votes	%	±%
Socialist	Hidenori Sakai	108,962	25.59	
Socialist	Kōzō Igarashi	84,953	19.95	
LDP	Hiroshi Imazu	79,806	18.74	
LDP	Yoshiteru Uekusa	72,207	16.96	
LDP	Eikō Kaneta	53,219	12.50	
JCP	Koshichiro Sawada	26,654	6.26	
Turnout			77.92	
Registered electors		550,216		
Party total seats		Won	Total	Change
Socialist		2	4	Steady
Liberal Democratic		2	4	Steady

=== Elections in the 1980s ===
1986: Hokkaido 2nd 4 members
Party	Candidate	Votes	%	±%
LDP	Masanori Kawata	94,964	22.09	▲4.59
Socialist	Kōzō Igarashi	82,068	19.09	▼0.61
Socialist	Yoshinori Yasui	79,493	18.49	▼1.31
LDP	Yoshiteru Uekusa	74,523	17.33	▼0.17
LDP	Shigetoshi Murakami	73,296	17.05	▼4.85
JCP	Koshichiro Sawada	16,394	3.81	▲0.21
Independent	Kunio Sasaki	9,169	2.13	new
Turnout			79.56	
Registered electors		550,118		
Party total seats		Won	Total	Change
Liberal Democratic		2	4	Steady
Socialist		2	4	Steady

- 1980 Japanese general election
  - Kozo Igarashi, Social Democratic Party, 100,311 votes
  - Japanese Communist Party, 15,378 votes
- 1979 Japanese general election
  - Japanese Communist Party, 21,693 votes
- 1976 Japanese general election
  - Japanese Communist Party, 31,223 votes
  - independent, 1,572 votes
- 1972 Japanese general election
  - independent, 26,983 votes
  - Japanese Communist Party, 24,964 votes
- 1969 Japanese general election
  - Japanese Communist Party, 25,256 votes
- 1967 Japanese general election
  - Japanese Communist Party, 22,322 votes
- 1963 Japanese general election
  - Japanese Communist Party, 6,976 votes
- 1960 Japanese general election
  - Japanese Communist Party, 5,534 votes
- 1958 Japanese general election
  - Japanese Communist Party, 6,675 votes
- 1955 Japanese general election
  - Japanese Communist Party, 7,685 votes
- 1953 Japanese general election
  - independent, 26,228 votes
  - Japanese Communist Party, 5,543 votes
- 1952 Japanese general election
  - independent, 27,466 votes
  - Japanese Communist Party, 6,139 votes
- 1949 Japanese general election
  - Japanese Communist Party, 11,063 votes
- 1947 Japanese general election
  - Japanese Communist Party, 3,271 votes
  - independent, 3,012 votes
