= Susumu Yamaguchi (politician) =

Japanese politician (born 1983)

- 山口 晋
- Official portrait, 2025

Member of the House of Representatives
- Incumbent
- Assumed office 9 February 2026
- Preceded by: Yunosuke Sakamoto
- Constituency: Saitama 10th
- In office 2 November 2021 – 9 October 2024
- Preceded by: Taimei Yamaguchi
- Succeeded by: Yunosuke Sakamoto
- Constituency: Saitama 10th

Personal details
- Born: 28 July 1983 (age 43) Kawajima, Saitama, Japan
- Party: Liberal Democratic
- Parent: Taimei Yamaguchi (father)
- Education: Seijo University; Hitotsubashi University; National University of Singapore

Susumu Yamaguchi (山口晋, Yamaguchi Susumu; born 28 July 1983) is a Japanese politician. He has been a member of the House of Representatives since 2026, having previously served from 2021 to 2024. He is the son of Taimei Yamaguchi.
