= Hokkaido 8th district =

Electoral district in Japan

Hokkaido 8th District
- Parliamentary constituency for the Japanese House of Representatives
- Numbered map of Hokkaido Prefecture single-member districts
- Prefecture: Hokkaido
- Proportional District: Hokkaido
- Electorate: 336,828(2026)

Current constituency
- Created: 1996
- Seats: One
- Party: LDP
- Representative: Jun Mukoyama
- Created from: Hokkaido 3rd district (1947–1993)
- Subprefecture: Oshima and Hiyama

Hokkaidō 8th district (北海道[第]8区) is a single-member electoral district for the House of Representatives, the lower house of the National Diet of Japan. It is located in the prefecture of Hokkaidō and consists of Hokkaido's Hiyama and Oshima subprefectures.

== History ==
From 1947 the district was known as the Hokkaido 3rd district and elected three members to the House. Under the 1994 reforms that came into effect at the 1996 general election, the district's boundaries were not changed but it was renamed to the 8th district and had its representation reduced to one. This reduction was offset by the introduction of the multi-member Hokkaido proportional representation block that elects eight members to represent the entire prefecture.

== List of representatives ==
| Representative | Party | Dates | Notes |
|---|---|---|---|
| Yoshio Hachiro | DPJ | 1996 – 2003 | Switched to the Hokkaido 4th district. |
| Seiichi Kaneta | DPJ | 2003 – 2009 | |
| Seiji Osaka | DPJ | 2009 – 2012 | |
| Kazuo Maeda | LDP | 2012 – 2014 | won a proportional seat in the Hokkaidō block in 2014 |
| Seiji Osaka | DPJ | 2014 – 2017 | |
| Seiji Osaka | CDP | 2017 – 2026 | |
| Jun Mukoyama | LDP | 2026 – | |

== Recent results ==
2026
| Party | Candidate | Votes | % | ±% |
|---|---|---|---|---|
| LDP | Jun Mukōyama | 108,229 | 55.3 | ▲12.17 |
| Centrist Reform | Seiji Osaka | 87,526 | 44.7 | ▼6.09 |
| Turnout | | 195,755 | 59.29 | ▲2.29 |
| LDP gain from Centrist Reform | | Swing | ▼2.7 | |

2024
| Party | Candidate | Votes | % | ±% |
|---|---|---|---|---|
| CDP | Seiji Osaka | 97,758 | 50.79 | ▼1.89 |
| LDP | Jun Mukōyama (elected in Hokkaido PR) | 83,006 | 43.13 | ▼4.19 |
| JCP | Katsumi Honma | 11,708 | 6.08 | ▲6.08 |
| Turnout | | | 57.00 | |

2021
| Party | Candidate | Votes | % | ±% |
|---|---|---|---|---|
| CDP | Seiji Osaka | 112,857 | 52.68 | ▼2.7 |
| LDP | Kazuo Maeda | 101,379 | 47.32 | ▲2.7 |
| Turnout | | | 60.08 | ▼0.33 |
| CDP hold | | Swing | ▼2.7 | |

2017
| Party | Candidate | Votes | % | ±% |
|---|---|---|---|---|
| CDP | Seiji Osaka (Note: The CDP is the successor party of the DP in this district, therefore the voting figures of the DP incumbent are used as a reference. Besides, Osaka run as an independent candidate because he announced so before the election. But he is able to be counted as a CDP candidate because he has joined CDP and was fielded by CDP after the election.) | 125,771 | 55.4 | ▲8.1 |
| LDP | Kazuo Maeda | 101,243 | 44.6 | ▲0.4 |
| Turnout | | 227,014 | 60.41 | ▲5.82 |
| CDP hold | | Swing | | |

2014
| Party | Candidate | Votes | % | ±% |
|---|---|---|---|---|
| Democratic | Seiji Osaka | 97,745 | 47.3 | |
| LDP | Kazuo Maeda (elected in Hokkaido PR) | 91,351 | 44.2 | |
| JCP | Yuko Harada | 17,465 | 8.5 | |
| Turnout | | 206,561 | 54.59 | ▼4.63 |
| Democratic gain from LDP | | Swing | | |

2012
| Party | Candidate | Votes | % | ±% |
|---|---|---|---|---|
| LDP | Kazuo Maeda | 107,937 | 47.5 | |
| Democratic | Seiji Osaka | 77,402 | 34.1 | |
| Tomorrow | Mika Kitade | 25,793 | 11.4 | |
| JCP | Kadai Takahashi | 15,953 | 7.0 | |
| Turnout | | 227,085 | 59.22 | ▼ |
| LDP gain from Democratic | | Swing | | |

2009
| Party | Candidate | Votes | % | ±% |
|---|---|---|---|---|
| Democratic | Seiji Osaka | 171,114 | 62.6 | |
| LDP | Keishiro Fukushima | 58,046 | 21.2 | |
| Independent | Kenji Sato | 40,090 | 14.7 | |
| Happiness Realization | Akira Nishino | 4,075 | 1.5 | |

2005
| Party | Candidate | Votes | % | ±% |
|---|---|---|---|---|
| Democratic | Seiichi Kaneta | 134,963 | 49.8 | |
| LDP | Kenji Sato | 114,141 | 42.1 | |
| JCP | Kazuo Maekawa | 21,891 | 8.1 | |
