= Hiranao Honda =

Japanese politician

- 本多 平直
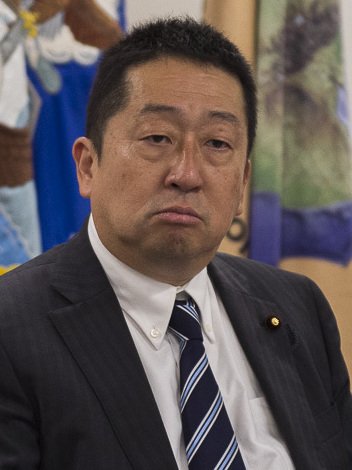
- Honda in 2019

Member of the House of Representatives
- In office 27 October 2017 – 28 July 2021
- Preceded by: Multi-member district
- Succeeded by: Maya Yamazaki
- Constituency: Hokkaido PR
- In office 30 August 2009 – 16 November 2012
- Preceded by: Toshio Kojima
- Succeeded by: Atsushi Nonaka
- Constituency: Saitama 12th
- In office 21 April 2004 – 8 August 2005
- Preceded by: Atsushi Kinoshita
- Succeeded by: Multi-member district
- Constituency: Northern Kanto PR

Personal details
- Born: 2 December 1964 (age 61) Sapporo, Hokkaido, Japan
- Party: CDP (since 2017)
- Other political affiliations: NPS (1994–2003); DPJ (2003–2016); DP (2016–2017)
- Spouse: Chinami Nishimura
- Children: 1
- Education: Hokkaido University
- Website: hiranao.com

Hiranao Honda (本多 平直, Honda Hiranao; born 2 December 1964) is a former Japanese politician of the Constitutional Democratic Party, who served as a member of the House of Representatives in the Diet (national legislature). A native of Sapporo, Honda represents Hokkaido through the Hokkaido PR block.

== Political career ==
Honda first ran for office in the 2003 election as the DPJ candidate for the Saitama 12th district, losing against the incumbent Toshio Masuda. He obtained a seat in the House in 2004 after a fellow DPJ member from the same proportional representation block resigned his PR block seat to run in the Saitama 8th district by-election. Honda remained a member until 2005, when he was defeated by Toshio Kojima in the Saitama-12th race. He would have a rematch with Kojima in the 2009 general election, when the DPJ won power from the LDP. He won by a 40,000-vote majority. During the DPJ's time in power, Honda served as a Special Adviser to Prime Minister and the Parliamentary Secretary to the Minister of Economy, Trade and Industry under Prime Minister Yoshihiko Noda.

The LDP landslide in the 2012 election swept Honda from his seat. He recontested the district in the 2014 election, again defeated by Atsushi Nonaka. After being replaced by Toshikazu Morita as the DP candidate for Saitama-12th for the 2017 election, Honda moved to the Hokkaido 4th district which encompasses parts of his hometown Sapporo. He contested the district for the first time in 2017 as a candidate for the post-split CDP. While losing against the incumbent Hiroyuki Nakamura, Honda obtained enough votes to be elected through the CDP's PR block list.

In late July 2021, it was reported that during a closed Constitutional Democratic Party of Japan (CDP) meeting convened to discuss raising the age of consent from 13 to 16, Hiranao Honda said that, as a man in his 50s, he thought that it is “strange” that he might be arrested if he had sex with a 14-year-old girl who consented to the act. In reaction to the public outrage and the CDP's planned further punishment due to said outrage, he quit the party and his seat.

== Personal life ==
Honda is married to fellow representative Chinami Nishimura. The couple's main witness at their marriage was former Prime Minister Naoto Kan. As of 2021, they were one of the three married couples sitting in the Diet, besides Taku Yamamoto-Sanae Takaichi and Taku Ōtsuka-Tamayo Marukawa.
