= Tadashi Kodaira =

Japanese politician

- 小平 忠

Member of the House of Representatives
- In office 18 December 1983 – 2 June 1986
- Preceded by: Saburō Saegusa
- Succeeded by: Yukio Hatoyama
- Constituency: Hokkaido 4th
- In office 21 November 1963 – 19 May 1980
- Preceded by: Sozo Watanabe
- Succeeded by: Seiichi Ikehata
- Constituency: Hokkaido 4th
- In office 19 April 1953 – 24 October 1960
- Preceded by: Sozo Watanabe
- Succeeded by: Sozo Watanabe
- Constituency: Hokkaido 4th
- In office 23 January 1949 – 28 August 1952
- Preceded by: Chikuyū Miyoshi
- Succeeded by: Sozo Watanabe
- Constituency: Hokkaido 4th

Personal details
- Born: 1 August 1915 Kurisawa, Hokkaido, Japan
- Died: 3 December 2000 (aged 85)
- Party: Democratic Socialist
- Other political affiliations: NFP (1948–1949); Kyōdōtō (1949–1951); RSP (1951–1955); JSP (1955–1960)
- Children: Tadamasa Kodaira
- Education: Nihon University

Tadashi Kodaira (Japanese: 小平忠) (August 1, 1915 – December 3, 2000) was a Japanese politician from Iwamizawa, Hokkaido. He was the father of Tadamasa Kodaira. He was a member of the House of Representatives of Japan from the Hokkaido 4th district. He is a graduate of Nihon University.
