= Parliamentarians' League for Japan's Anime, Manga, and Games =

Group of Japanese legislators

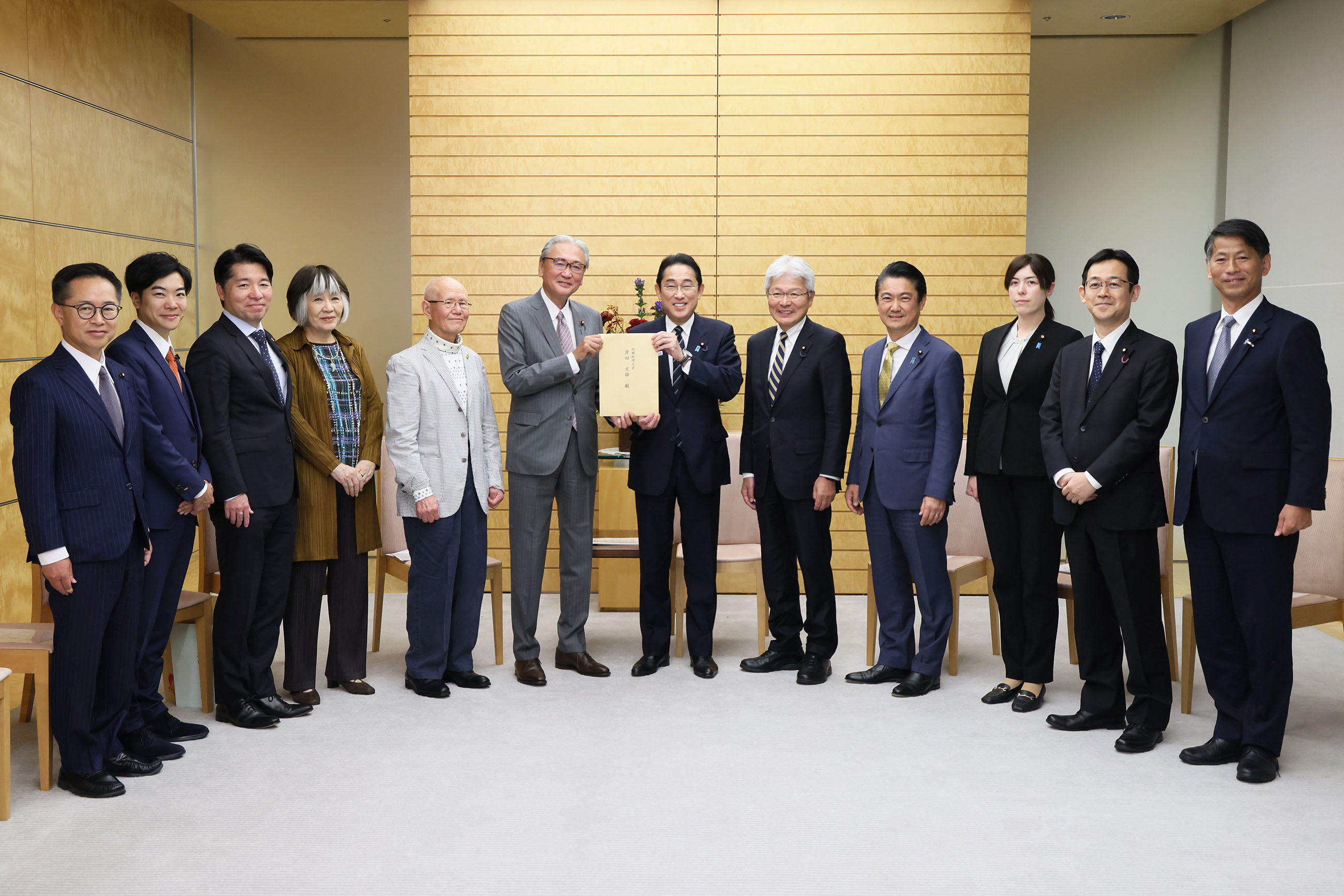
Members of a group calling on Prime Minister Fumio Kishida to establish a fund to protect manga culture.

Parliamentarians' League for Japan's Anime, Manga, and Games (Japanese: マンガ・アニメ・ゲームに関する議員連盟, romanized: Manga-anime-gēmu-ni-kansuru-giinrenmei) is an organization made up of members of the Japanese National Diet whose purpose is to promote manga, anime, and video games. The organization aims to support Japanese manga artists, animators, and game developers, and to archive their works. It is a bipartisan organization. Tarō Asō, a member of the House of Representatives from the Liberal Democratic Party, serves as its chief adviser.

== History ==
It was founded by Keiji Furuya on November 18, 2014. On October 22, 2020, the group petitioned the government to protect Comiket from the effects of lockdowns due to the COVID-19 pandemic. On May 29, 2024, a request was made to the government to establish a new facility to preserve original anime drawings. The general meeting held in Tokyo on January 30, 2025, was attended by industry figures such as former manga artist and politician Ken Akamatsu, as well as Hideaki Anno and Tetsuya Chiba.

As of 2025, the organization has 110 members.
