= Saitama 12th district =

Japanese constituency

Saitama 12th District
- Parliamentary constituency for the Japanese House of Representatives
- Numbered map of Saitama Prefecture single-member districts
- Prefecture: Saitama
- Proportional District: Northern Kanto
- Electorate: 370,686 （October 18, 2021）

Current constituency
- Created: 1994
- Seats: One
- Party: LDP
- Representative: Atsushi Nonaka
- Created from: Saitama 3rd "medium-sized" district Saitama 4th "medium-sized" district
- Municipalities: Kumagaya city (Formerly Kumagaya City, Formerly Ōsato Town, Formerly Menuma Town), Gyōda City, Hanyū City, Kazo City, Kōnosu City (Formerly Kōnan Town)

Saitama 12th district (埼玉県第12区, Saitama-ken dai-ju-niku or simply 埼玉12区, Saitama-ken ju-niku) is a single-member constituency of the House of Representatives in the national Diet of Japan located in Saitama Prefecture.

== Area ==
After redistricting in 2022, the former town of Kawasato was moved to the 6th district and the 12th covers the cities of:

- Kumagaya
- Gyōda
- Kazo
- Hanyū

== List of representatives ==
Election	Representative	Party	Notes
1996	Toshio Masuda	New Frontier	
1996	Toshio Masuda	Liberal Democratic	
2000	Toshio Kojima	Liberal Democratic	
2003	Toshio Masuda	Liberal Democratic	
2005	Toshio Kojima	Liberal Democratic	
2009	Hiranao Honda	Democratic	
2012	Atsushi Nonaka	Liberal Democratic	
2014	Atsushi Nonaka	Liberal Democratic	
2017	Atsushi Nonaka	Liberal Democratic	
2021	Toshikazu Morita	CDP	
2024	Toshikazu Morita	CDP	
2026	Atsushi Nonaka	Liberal Democratic	

== Election results ==
=== 2026 ===
2026
Party	Candidate	Votes	%	±%
LDP	Atsushi Nonaka (PR seat incumbent)	102,382	55.8	▲13.3
Centrist Reform	Toshikazu Morita (incumbent)	81,103	44.2	▼13.3
Registered electors		364,453		
Turnout			51.92	▲1.50
LDP gain from Centrist Reform				

=== 2024 ===
2024
Party	Candidate	Votes	%	±%
CDP	Toshikazu Morita (incumbent)	103,324	57.49	▲6.46
Liberal Democratic (endorsed by Komeito)	Atsushi Nonaka (PR seat incumbent) (won PR seat)	76,695	42.51	▼6.46
Majority		26,929	14.98	▲12.92
Registered electors		367,392		
Turnout		179,719	50.42	▼5.10
CDP hold				

=== 2021 ===
2021
Party	Candidate	Votes	%	±%
CDP	Toshikazu Morita (PR seat incumbent)	102,627	51.03	New
Liberal Democratic (endorsed by Komeito)	Atsushi Nonaka (incumbent) (won PR seat)	98,493	48.97	
Majority		4,134	2.06	
Registered electors		369,482		
Turnout			55.52	▲3.24
CDP gain from LDP				

=== 2017 ===
2017
Party	Candidate	Votes	%	±%
Liberal Democratic (endorsed by Komeito)	Atsushi Nonaka (incumbent)	86,499	44.96	
Kibō no Tō	Toshikazu Morita (won PR seat)	86,007	44.71	New
Communist	Hidehiro Hayashi	19,878	10.33	
Majority		492	0.25	
Registered electors		376,359		
Turnout			52.28	▲0.27
LDP hold				

=== 2014 ===
2014
Party	Candidate	Votes	%	±%
Liberal Democratic (endorsed by Komeito)	Atsushi Nonaka (incumbent)	72,422	38.58	
Future Generations	Toshikazu Morita	57,299	30.53	New
Democratic	Hiranao Honda	41,407	22.06	
Communist	Chikako Suzuki	16,570	8.83	
Majority		15,123	8.05	
Registered electors		371,546		
Turnout			52.01	▼5.03
LDP hold				
