= Hiroshi Kamiya (politician) =

Japanese politician

- 神谷 裕
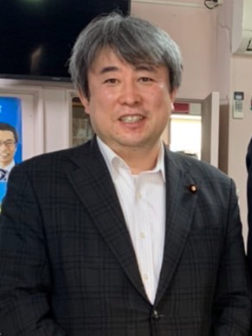
- Kamiya in 2022

Member of the House of Representatives
- Incumbent
- Assumed office 27 October 2017
- Preceded by: Multi-member district
- Constituency: Hokkaido PR (2017–2024); Hokkaido 10th (2024–present)

Personal details
- Born: 10 August 1968 (age 58) Toshima, Tokyo, Japan
- Party: DRP (since 2026)
- Other political affiliations: DPJ (2014–2016); DP (2016–2017); CDP (2017–2026); CRA (2026)
- Education: Teikyo University
- Website: Profile

Hiroshi Kamiya (神谷 裕, Kamiya Hiroshi; born 10 August 1968) is a Japanese politician of the Centrist Reform Alliance and a member of the House of Representatives in the Diet (national legislature). Kamiya represents Hokkaido through the Hokkaido PR block.

Kamiya first ran for office in the 2014 election as the DPJ candidate for the Hokkaido 10th district, losing against the incumbent Hisashi Inatsu. He would have a rematch with Inatsu in the 2017 general election. This time, he lost by a margin of 513 votes, making Hokkaido-10th one of the most marginal seats in the country. Nonetheless, Kamiya obtained enough votes to be elected through the CDP's PR block list. He won the district in 2024 after winning proportional representation again in 2021, and became one of 7 CRA candidates to survive the 2026 landslide in single member districts. Kamiya was reelected to his seat by a very narrow margin of 21 votes, making Hokkaido-10th the most marginal seat in the election.

Before running for public office, Kamiya worked as a secretary in the offices of Councillor Eri Tokunaga and Representative Tadamasa Kodaira. He also previously worked in a fisheries cooperative.
