= Yukari Iijima =

Japanese politician (born 1964)

- 飯島 夕雁

Member of the House of Representatives
- In office 11 September 2005 – 21 July 2009
- Constituency: Hokkaido PR

Personal details
- Born: 19 May 1964 (age 62) Tokyo, Japan
- Party: Liberal Democratic
- Education: Chuo University

Yukari Iijima (飯島 夕雁, Iijima Yukari; born 19 May 1964) is a Japanese politician of the Liberal Democratic Party, a member of the House of Representatives in the Diet (national legislature). A native of Mitaka, Tokyo and graduate of Chuo University, she became the Superintendent of Education for the island of Aogashima in 2002, working there for three years. In 2005, she was elected to the House of Representatives.

== See also ==
- Koizumi Children
