= Toshio Masuda (politician) =

Japanese politician (born 1929)

- 増田 敏男
- Official portrait, 2002

Member of the House of Representatives; from Northern Kanto
- In office 18 February 1990 – 8 August 2005
- Preceded by: Eitaro Itoyama
- Succeeded by: Toshio Kojima
- Constituency: Saitama 3rd (1990–1996); Saitama 12th (1996–2000); PR block (2000–2003); Saitama 12th (2003–2005)

Mayor of Kumagaya
- In office 19 May 1982 – June 1986
- Preceded by: Kuroda Uminosuke
- Succeeded by: Kazuo Kobayashi

Member of the Saitama Prefectural Assembly
- In office April 1967 – 1982

Personal details
- Born: 20 April 1929 Kumagaya, Saitama, Japan
- Party: Liberal Democratic (1990–1993; 1997–2005)
- Other political affiliations: Independent (1959–1990); JRP (1993–1994); NFP (1994–1997)

Toshio Masuda (増田 敏男, Masuda Toshio; born 20 April 1929) is a retired Japanese politician who served as a member of the House of Representatives.

== Career ==
In 1959, Masuda was first elected to the Kumagaya City Council and served one term.

In April 1967, he ran for the first time in an election for a member of the Saitama Prefectural Assembly from Kumagaya City. Since then, he has served as a member of the Saitama Prefectural Assembly for four terms, and from March 1981 to March 1982, he has also served as chairman of the Saitama Prefectural Assembly.

In May 1982, he resigned as a member of the Saitama Prefectural Assembly and ran for a mayor of Kumagaya City and was elected for the first time.

In June 1986, he resigned as the mayor of Kumagaya City in the middle of his second term. On the 6th of the following month, he ran as an independent from Saitama 3rd district in the 1986 Japanese general election for members of the House of Representatives, but failed.

On 18 February 1990, he ran again as an independent from Saitama 3rd district in the 1990 Japanese general election and was elected for the first time. Since then, the Liberal Democratic Party has added Masuda as its nominee.

In 1993, Masuda left the LDP and joined the formation of the JRP. In the 1993 Japanese general election, he was elected for the second time as an official candidate of the JRP. In the same year, Masuda was appointed Undersecretary of Land, Infrastructure and Transport under the Hosokawa Cabinet.

In 1994, he joined the NFP.

In 1996, when the general election system for members of the House of Representatives was changed to a system of proportional representation in single-seat constituencies, Masuda ran as a Saitama 12th district’s candidate for NFP's nomination. He was elected for the third time in a victory over Toshio Kojima of the LDP.

When the NFP was dissolved in 1997, he returned to the LDP. Although Single seats needed to be coordinated with the same Kojima, Kojima and Masuda agreed to alternate between single seats and proportional blocks.

In the 2000 Japanese general election, he was elected for the fourth time in Northern Kanto PR block.

On 6 January 2001, he became State Minister of Health, Labour and Welfare of the Second Mori Second Reshuffled Cabinet. On 26 April of the same year, he resigned as Deputy Minister of Health, Labour and Welfare.

On 2 October 2002, he became State Minister of Justice of the First Koizumi First Reshuffled Cabinet. On 22 September of the following year, he resigned as State Minister of Justice.

On 9 November 2003, he ran for the LDP nomination from Saitama 12th district and was elected for the fifth time.

In the 2005 Japanese general election, Masuda was originally scheduled to run in Saitama 12th district, but announced that he would not run before the election. He retired from politics.
