= Tatsuo Takahashi =

Japanese politician (1928–2001)

- 高橋 辰夫

Member of the House of Representatives
- In office 18 July 1993 – 27 September 1996
- Preceded by: Kenji Nakazawa
- Succeeded by: Constituency abolished
- Constituency: Hokkaido 4th
- In office 7 October 1979 – 24 January 1990
- Preceded by: Kōsaku Shinoda
- Succeeded by: Tadamasa Kodaira
- Constituency: Hokkaido 4th

Member of the Hokkaido Legislative Assembly
- In office 1975–1979
- In office 1963–1974

Personal details
- Born: 23 November 1928 Date, Hokkaido, Japan
- Died: 11 October 2001 (aged 72) Sapporo, Hokkaido, Japan
- Party: Liberal Democratic
- Relatives: Seiko Hashimoto (sister-in-law)
- Education: Chuo University

Tatsuo Takahashi (Japanese: 高橋辰夫; 23 November 1928 – 10 October 2001) was a Japanese politician from Date, Hokkaido. He was elected five times as a member of the House of Representatives of Japan from Hokkaido's 4th district (1979–1990, 1993–1996 from the Liberal Democratic Party of Japan. In his last term, he served alongside Yukio Hatoyama, Tadamasa Kodaira and Shōichi Watanabe. He retired from politics after losing against Yukio Hatayama in 1996. Former speed skater and current member of the House of Councillors Seiko Hashimoto is his sister in law.
