= Hokkaido 10th district =

Japan House of Representatives constituency

Hokkaido 10th District
- Parliamentary constituency for the Japanese House of Representatives
- Numbered map of Hokkaido Prefecture single-member districts
- Prefecture: Hokkaido
- Proportional District: Hokkaido
- Electorate: 259,676 (2026)

Current constituency
- Created: 1994
- Seats: One
- Party: CRA
- Representative: Hiroshi Kamiya
- Created from: Portions of the former 2nd and 4th districts
- Subprefecture: Sorachi and Rumoi (plus portions of Kamikawa and Sōya)

Hokkaidō 10th district (北海道[第]10区) is a single-member electoral district for the House of Representatives, the lower house of the National Diet of Japan.

The district is located in the prefecture (-dō) of Hokkaidō and represents the municipalities within Hokkaido's Sorachi and Rumoi subprefectures, as well as the towns of Horokanai (formerly within Sorachi, now a part of Kamikawa Subprefecture) and Horonobe (formerly within Rumoi, now a part of Sōya Subprefecture).

== History ==
The district was created in 1994 when the current system of single-member districts was introduced and first contested in the 1996 general election. It was formed from portions of the former 2nd and 4th districts that had existed under the multi-member system since 1947. In 1996 the seat was won by Democratic Party of Japan member Tadamasa Kodaira, who had been one of the representatives of the former 4th district since 1990. Kodaira retained the seat at the following four elections, until his loss to Komeito candidate Hisashi Inatsu at the 2012 general election. Inatsu retained the seat in subsequent elections until 2024.

== List of representatives ==
Representative	Party	Dates	Notes
Tadamasa Kodaira	DPJ	1996 – 2012	Also lost in the PR block
Hisashi Inatsu	KM	2012 – 2024	
Hiroshi Kamiya	CDP	2024 – 2026	
Hiroshi Kamiya	CRA	2026 –	

== Recent results ==
2026
Party	Candidate	Votes	%	±%
Centrist Reform	Hiroshi Kamiya (incumbent)	74,908	50.01	▼0.76
LDP	Kōichi Watanabe (elected via PR)	74,887	49.99	
Majority		21	0.02	
Registered electors		259,676		
Turnout			60.01	▲0.11
Centrist Reform hold				

2024
Party	Candidate	Votes	%	±%
CDP	Hiroshi Kamiya (PR seat incumbent)	78,362	50.77	▲4.70
Komeito	Hisashi Inatsu (incumbent)	75,990	49.23	▼4.70
Majority		2,352	1.54	
Registered electors		267,329		
Turnout			59.90	▼4.90
CDP gain from Komeito				

2021
Party	Candidate	Votes	%	±%
Komeito	Hisashi Inatsu (incumbent) (endorsed by the Liberal Democratic Party and New Party Daichi)	96,843	53.93	▲3.8
CDP	Hiroshi Kamiya (elected via PR)	82,718	46.07	▼3.8
Majority			7.8	▲7.6
Turnout			64.80	▼1.36
Komeito hold		Swing	▲3.8	

2017
Party	Candidate	Votes	%	±%
Komeito	Hisashi Inatsu (incumbent) (endorsed by the Liberal Democratic Party and New Party Daichi)	96,795	50.1	▲1.6
CDP	Hiroshi Kamiya (elected via PR)	96,282	49.9	▲10.1
Majority		513	0.2	▼8.5
Turnout			65.16	▲6.31
Komeito hold		Swing	▼4.3	

2014
Party	Candidate	Votes	%	±%
Komeito	Hisashi Inatsu (incumbent) (endorsed by the Liberal Democratic Party)	86,722	48.5	
Democratic	Hiroshi Kamiya	71,219	39.8	
JCP	Kenji Kimura	20,803	11.6	
Turnout			58.85	

2012
Party	Candidate	Votes	%	±%
Komeito	Hisashi Inatsu (PR block incumbent) (endorsed by the Liberal Democratic Party)	107,937	47.5	
Democratic	Tadamasa Kodaira (incumbent) (endorsed by the People's New Party)	62,998	30.9	
NP-Daichi	Takahiro Asano (PR block incumbent) (endorsed by the Tomorrow Party of Japan)	39,918	19.5	
JCP	Kenji Kimura	13,320	6.5	

2009
Party	Candidate	Votes	%	±%
Democratic	Tadamasa Kodaira (incumbent)	159,473	62.5	
LDP	Yukari Iijima (PR block incumbent)	89,287	35.1	
Happiness Realization	Makoto Obayashi	6,114	2.4	

2005
Party	Candidate	Votes	%	±%
Democratic	Tadamasa Kodaira (incumbent)	109,422	62.5	
Independent	Takafumi Yamashita (PR block incumbent)	78,604	29.4	
LDP	Yukari Iijima (elected to PR block)	62,100	2.4	
JCP	Tateo Tani	17,617	6.6	
