= Hokkaido 4th district (1947–1993) =

Former Japan House of Representatives constituency

== List of representatives ==
- Haruo Okada, Socialist Party of Japan, 1947, 1949, 1952, 1953, 1955, 1958, 1960, 1963, 1967, 1972, 1976, 1979, 1980, 1983
- Tadashi Kodaira, Socialist then Social Democratic, 1949・1953・1955・1958・1963・1967・1969・1972・1976・1979・1983
- Seiichi Ikehata, Social Democratic Party, 1976–1979, 1983–1996
- Shōichi Watanabe, Liberal Democratic Party, 1979, 1980, 1983, 1986, 1990, 1993
- Tatsuo Takahashi, Liberal Democratic Party, 1979–1990, 1993–1996
- Yukio Hatoyama, Liberal Democratic Party until 1993, New Party Sakigake, 1986–1996
- Tadamasa Kodaira, Social Democratic Party, 1990–1996

== Election results ==
- 1993 Japanese general election
  - Yukio Hatoyama, New Party Sakigake, 111,824 votes
  - Tatsuo Takahashi, Liberal Democratic Party, 81,334 votes
  - Seiichi Ikehata, Social Democratic Party, 73,433 votes
  - Shōichi Watanabe, Liberal Democratic Party, 73,410 votes
  - Tadamasa Kodaira, Social Democratic Party, 71,993 votes
- 1990 Japanese general election
  - Seiichi Ikehata, Social Democratic Party, 102,553 votes
  - Yukio Hatoyama, Liberal Democratic Party, 85,516 votes
  - Tadamasa Kodaira, Social Democratic Party, 85,210 votes
  - Shōichi Watanabe, Liberal Democratic Party, 81,793 votes
- 1986 Japanese general election
  - Tatsuo Takahashi, Liberal Democratic Party, 100,297 votes
  - Yukio Hatoyama, Liberal Democratic Party, 93,001 votes
  - Seiichi Ikehata, Social Democratic Party, 87,603 votes
  - Shōichi Watanabe, Liberal Democratic Party, 84,626 votes
- 1983 Japanese general election
  - Shōichi Watanabe, Liberal Democratic Party, 77,696 votes
- 1980 Japanese general election
  - Shōichi Watanabe, Liberal Democratic Party, 77,918 votes
- 1979 Japanese general election
  - Shōichi Watanabe, Liberal Democratic Party, 74,002 votes
- 1976 Japanese general election
- 1972 Japanese general election
- 1967 Japanese general election
- 1963 Japanese general election
- 1960 Japanese general election
- 1958 Japanese general election
- 1955 Japanese general election
- 1953 Japanese general election
- 1952 Japanese general election
- 1949 Japanese general election
- 1947 Japanese general election
