= Keiji Furuya =

Japanese politician (born 1952)

- 古屋 圭司
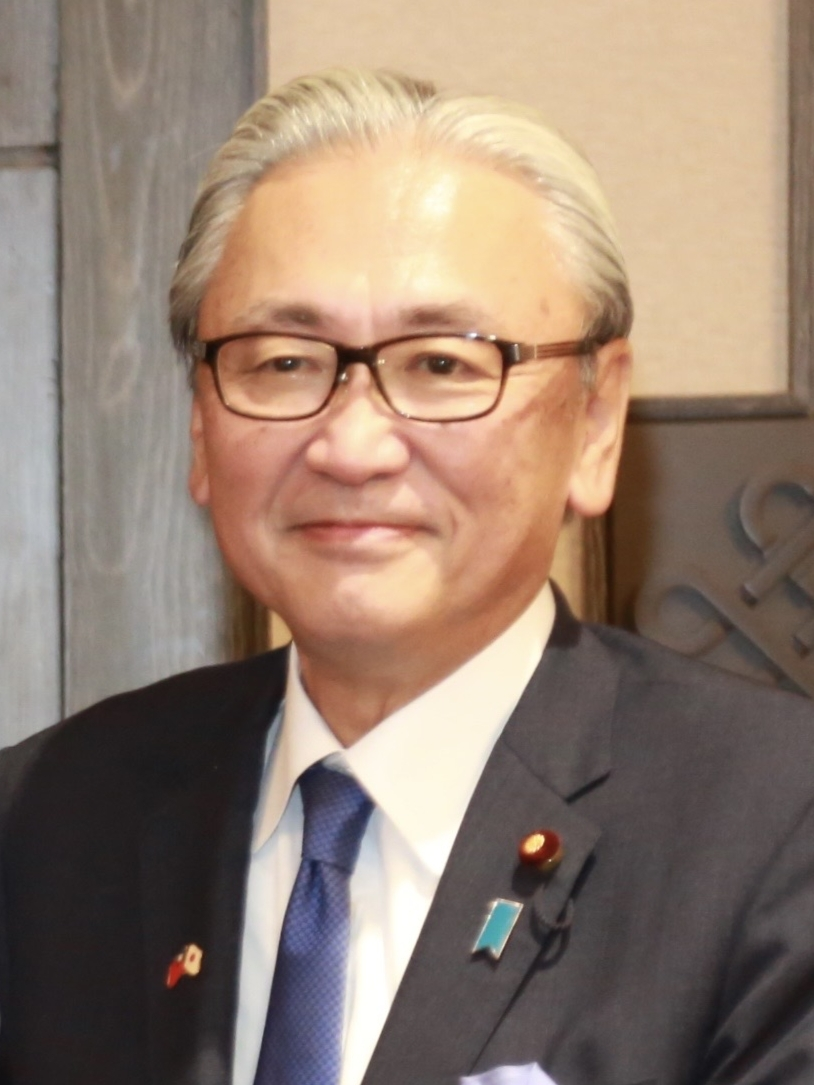
- Furuya in 2023

Chairman of the National Public Safety Commission
- In office 26 December 2012 – 16 September 2014
- Prime Minister: Shinzo Abe
- Preceded by: Tadamasa Kodaira
- Succeeded by: Eriko Yamatani

Member of the House of Representatives
- Incumbent
- Assumed office 18 February 1990
- Preceded by: Tōru Furuya
- Constituency: Gifu 2nd (1990–1996); Gifu 5th (1996–2009); Tōkai PR (2009–2012); Gifu 5th (2012–present)

Personal details
- Born: 1 November 1952 (age 73) Chiyoda, Tokyo, Japan
- Party: Liberal Democratic
- Relatives: Tōru Furuya (uncle)
- Education: Seikei University

Keiji Furuya (古屋 圭司, Furuya Keiji; born 1 November 1952) is a Japanese politician of the Liberal Democratic Party, serving as a member of the House of Representatives in the Diet of Japan.

== Biography ==
Keiji Furuya was born on 1 November 1952, in Chiyoda, Tokyo. His uncle Tōru Furuya was a senior police officer and politician for the Liberal Democratic Party. As a child, Furuya lived for several years in the United States and attended school there. After returning to Japan, he attended Seikei High School and Seikei University, studying economics. He was a year ahead of future Prime Minister Shinzo Abe at Seikei. Furuya graduated in 1976 and began working for the Taishō Marine and Fire Insurance Company.

Furuya began working as secretary to Foreign Minister Shintaro Abe, the father of Shinzo Abe, in April 1984. In November, he became secretary to his uncle, Home Minister Tōru Furuya. When his uncle retired, Furuya was elected to the House of Representatives for the first time in 1990.

Furuya was parliamentary vice minister of Justice under the Murayama Cabinet and senior vice minister of Economy, Trade and Industry under the First Koizumi Cabinet. He ran as an independent in the 2005 election due to opposition to Koizumi's postal reform, but rejoined the LDP the following year.

He entered the Second Abe Cabinet as Chairman of the National Public Safety Commission in December 2012, serving until September 2014. He served as chairman of the LDP Election Strategy Committee from August 2016 to November 2017.

Furuya supported Sanae Takaichi in her three runs for LDP president and was characterised as being like an older brother to Takaichi. When Takaichi was elected in October 2025, Furuya was reappointed chairman of the Election Strategy Committee.

After the landslide victory for the LDP in the 2026 general election, Furuya was selected as chairman of the Commission on the Constitution in the House of Representatives. This was intended by Takaichi to accelerate deliberations on constitutional amendments.

=== Affiliated organisations ===
Affiliated to the openly revisionist lobby Nippon Kaigi, Furuya is also a member of the following groups at the Diet: Japan (Vice Chair), Textbooks, Shinto, Yasukuni, Fundamental Education Law Reform (Committee Chair), Nikkyoso, Constitutional Revision, Japan Rebirth (Delegate Chair), China Memorial Photographs Protest (Vice Chair), Proper Japan, Protest American Comfort Women Resolution, North Korea Kidnap Victims (Secretary General).

He is the head of the Japan-ROC Diet Members' Consultative Council. He is also the head of the Parliamentarians' League for Japan's Anime, Manga, and Games.

=== Chinese sanctions ===
On 30 March 2026, the Chinese government sanctioned Furuya for "sneaky visit Taiwan for multiple times, colluding with 'Taiwan independence' separatist forces, seriously violates the One China principle and the spirit of the four political documents between China and Japan, blatant interference in China's internal affairs and seriously undermines China's sovereignty and territorial integrity". Under the order of the Foreign Affairs Ministry, Furuya is banned from entering mainland China, Hong Kong, and Macau. Takaichi called the sanctions "a great honor" in a private email.

== Honors ==
- Order of Brilliant Star with Grand Cordon (2026)

House of Representatives (Japan)
Preceded by Takeo Kawamura	Chairman of the Committee on Education, Culture and Science; 2002–2003	Succeeded by Yasuko Ikenobō
Preceded by Tsutomu Sato	Chairman of the Committee on Rules and Administration; 2017–2018	Succeeded by Sanae Takaichi
Preceded by Koichi Takemasa	Chairman of the Commission on the Constitution; 2026–present	Incumbent
Political offices
Preceded by Tadamasa Kodaira	Chairman of the National Public Safety Commission; 2012–2014	Succeeded by Eriko Yamatani
Party political offices
Liberal Democratic Party
Preceded by Takeo Kawamura	Chief of the Public Relations Headquarters; 2008–2009	Succeeded by Yuriko Koike
Preceded by Toshimitsu Motegi	Chairman of the Election Strategy Committee; 2016–2017	Succeeded by Ryū Shionoya
Preceded by Seiji Kihara	Chairman of the Election Strategy Committee; 2025–2026	Succeeded by Yasutoshi Nishimura
