= Hokkaido 3rd district (1947–1993) =

Electoral district in the Diet of Japan

Hokkaidō 3rd District
- 北海道第3区
- Former constituency for the Japanese House of Representatives
- District: Hokkaidō

Former constituency
- Created: 1947
- Abolished: 1994
- Number of members: 3
- Replaced by: Hokkaido 8th

The Hokkaido 3nd District (Japanese: 北海道第3区, Hepburn: Hokkaidō dai-san-ku) is a former constituency for the House of Representatives between the 1947 and 1993 elections. It was abolished following the 1994 electoral reform when Japan moved from single non-transferable vote to a parallel system.

Located in the prefecture (-dō) of Hokkaidō, prior to its dissolution, it consisted of the southernmost portion of Hokkaido, centred on Hakodate, containing the area that comprises contemporary Hiyama and Oshima Subprefectures. It had 417,098 registered electors at the 1993 election.

With the return to single-member districts in the 1990s electoral reform, the district became the Hokkaido 8th district.

== List of representatives ==
- Yoshio Hachiro, independent then Social Democratic Party, 1990, 1993
- Seiichi Kaneta, independent, 1993

== Election results ==
- 1993 Japanese general election
  - Liberal Democratic Party, 81,153 votes
  - Yoshio Hachiro, Social Democratic Party, 55,620 votes
  - Seiichi Kaneta, independent, 47,339 votes
  - Japanese Communist Party, 15,069 votes
- 1990 Japanese general election
  - Yoshio Hachiro, independent, 71,973 votes
  - Japanese Communist Party, 13,437 votes
- 1986 Japanese general election
  - Japanese Communist Party, 19,140 votes
- 1983 Japanese general election
  - Japanese Communist Party, 19,392 votes
- 1980 Japanese general election
  - Japanese Communist Party, 37,980 votes
- 1979 Japanese general election
  - Japanese Communist Party, 26,143 votes
- 1976 Japanese general election
  - Japanese Communist Party, 34,534 votes
- 1972 Japanese general election
  - Japanese Communist Party, 29,864 votes
- 1969 Japanese general election
  - Japanese Communist Party, 16,773 votes
- 1967 Japanese general election
  - Japanese Communist Party, 11,904 votes
- 1963 Japanese general election
  - Japanese Communist Party, 7,736 votes
- 1960 Japanese general election
  - Japanese Communist Party, 4,320 votes
- 1958 Japanese general election
  - Japanese Communist Party, 1,891 votes
- 1955 Japanese general election
- Japanese Communist Party, 1,827 votes
- 1953 Japanese general election
- 1952 Japanese general election
- 1949 Japanese general election
- 1947 Japanese general election
  - Toshiko Karasawa, Japanese Communist Party, 6,501 votes
