= Group of Independents (Japan) =

Japanese parliamentary group

- Representatives leader: Katsuya Okada
- Founded: 26 October 2017; 7 years ago
- Dissolved: 30 September 2019
- Ideology: Centrism
- Representatives: 13 / 465

The Group of Independents (無所属の会, Mushozoku no Kai) was a parliamentary group in the House of Representatives, the lower house of the Japanese National Diet. It consisted exclusively of non-party deputies, many of whom were formerly members of the Democratic Party.

The party had not nominated any of its members as candidates in the 2017 House of Representatives election in an effort by the party leadership around Seiji Maehara to join Tokyo governor Yuriko Koike's new Party of Hope for the election. But some members broke away on the left to form the Constitutional Democratic Party (CDP), and others were not accepted as candidates by the Party of Hope, including several long-term senior members. Some of the rejected members who had to contest the election without party nomination were elected nonetheless, and a group of these around former party leader Katsuya Okada formed the Group of Independents after the election.

The membership of the group subsequently changed several times as some members joined the CDP or the Democratic Party for the People (2018 merger of Democratic Party and Party of Hope, but some Democrats left the party instead), and other independent ex-Democrats or Party of Hope members joined it. Also, in May 2018, Kishirō Nakamura a 14-term member from Ibaraki and former Liberal Democrat, joined the Group of Independents.

In January 2019, several members, including leader Katsuya Okada, left to join other parliamentary groups (mainly the CDP), while others joined. Seven members around Yoshihiko Noda formed a successor group as The Reviewing Group on Social Security Policy (社会保障を立て直す国民会議, Shakaihoshō o tatenaosu kokumin kaigi). In March 2019, Kentarō Motomura resigned from his seat in order to mount his [successful] candidacy for mayor of Sagamihara City (part of the April 2019 Japanese unified local elections).

For the 200th National Diet opening in October 2019, the group merged into the new joint House of Representatives parliamentary group formed by the CDP and DPFP, and 社保, "Social Security" became part of the new group's name.

== Members ==
Membership as of 9 April 2019:

- Kōichirō Genba, 9th term, Fukushima 3, formerly LDP→independent→NPH→DPJ→DP
- Yoshihiko Noda, 8th term, Chiba 4, formerly independent→JNP→NFP→DPJ→DP
- Kazuhiko Shigetoku, 3rd term, Aichi 12, formerly independent→JRP→JIP→Kaikaku kesshū no kai (改革結集の会)→DP→independent
- Yōsei Ide, 3rd term, Nagano 3, formerly YP→UP→DP→Kibō→independent
- Katsuhito Nakajima, 3rd term, Yamanashi 1, formerly YP→DPJ→DP→independent
- Hajime Hirota, 1st term (+2 in the House of Councillors), Kōchi 2, formerly LDP→independent→DPJ→DP
