= Gifu 5th district =

Legislative district of Japan

Gifu 5th District
- Parliamentary constituency for the Japanese House of Representatives
- Numbered map of Gifu Prefecture single-member districts
- Prefecture: Gifu
- Proportional District: Tōkai
- Electorate: 271,830

Current constituency
- Created: 1994
- Seats: One
- Party: Liberal Democratic
- Representative: Keiji Furuya
- Municipalities: Ena, Mizunami, Nakatsugawa, Tajimi and Toki

Gifu 5th district (岐阜県第5区, Gifu-ken dai-goku or simply 岐阜5区, Gifu-goku) is a single-member constituency of the House of Representatives in the national Diet of Japan located in Gifu Prefecture.

== List of representatives ==
Election	Representative	Party	Notes
1996	Keiji Furuya	Liberal Democratic	
2000	Keiji Furuya	Liberal Democratic	
2003	Keiji Furuya	Liberal Democratic	
2005	Keiji Furuya	Independent	
2009	Yoshinobu Achiha	Democratic	
2012	Keiji Furuya	Liberal Democratic	
2014	Keiji Furuya	Liberal Democratic	
2017	Keiji Furuya	Liberal Democratic	
2021	Keiji Furuya	Liberal Democratic	
2024	Keiji Furuya	Liberal Democratic	
2026	Keiji Furuya	Liberal Democratic	

== Election results ==
2026
Party	Candidate	Votes	%	±%
LDP	Keiji Furuya	83,214	52.1	▲3.8
Centrist Reform	Satoshi Mano	37,630	23.6	▼15
DPP	Yoshida Kiyoshi	27,577	17.3	
Ishin	Ryoji Yamada	11,268	7.1	▼6
Registered electors		259,894		
Turnout		159,689	62.61	▲3.10
LDP hold				

2024
Party	Candidate	Votes	%	±%
LDP	Keiji Furuya	73,679	48.3	▼0.2
CDP	Satoshi Mano (elected in Tōkai PR block)	58,973	38.6	▼1.9
Ishin	Ryoji Yamada	19,973	13.1	▲7.2
Registered electors		263,919		
Turnout			59.51	▼3.21
LDP hold				

2021
Party	Candidate	Votes	%	±%
Liberal Democratic	Keiji Furuya (Incumbent)	82,140	48.49	
CDP	Ruru Imai	68,615	40.50	New
Innovation	Ryoji Yamada	9,921	5.86	New
Communist	Shoko Ozeki	8,736	5.16	
Registered electors		273,847		
Turnout			62.72	▲1.36
LDP hold				

2017
Party	Candidate	Votes	%	±%
Liberal Democratic	Keiji Furuya (Incumbent)	92,113	54.05	
Kibō no Tō	Yoshinobu Achiha	57,982	34.02	New
Communist	Shoko Ozeki	20,318	11.92	
Registered electors		283,802		
Turnout			61.36	▲2.76
LDP hold				
