= Eiko Kaneta =

Japanese politician (1942–2022)

- 金田 英行
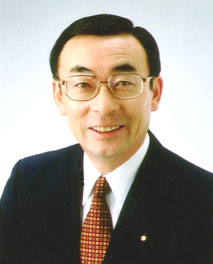
- Official portrait, 2001

Member of the House of Representatives
- In office 18 July 1993 – 8 August 2005
- Preceded by: Yoshiteru Uekusa
- Succeeded by: Multi-member district
- Constituency: Hokkaido 2nd (1993–1996); Hokkaido 7th (1996–2003); Hokkaido PR (2003–2005)

Personal details
- Born: 30 December 1942 Asahikawa, Hokkaido, Japan
- Died: 17 June 2022 (aged 79) Tokyo, Japan
- Party: Liberal Democratic
- Education: Chuo University

Eiko Kaneta (Japanese: 金田 英行 Kaneta Eikō; 30 December 1942 – 17 June 2022) was a Japanese politician. A member of the Liberal Democratic Party, he served in the House of Representatives from 1993 to 2005.

Kaneta died in Tokyo on 17 June 2022 at the age of 79.
