= Shōichi Watanabe (politician) =

Japanese politician (1930–2000)

- 渡邊 省一
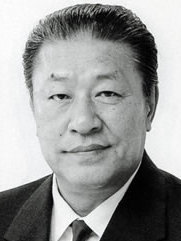

Director-General of the Science and Technology Agency
- In office 21 June 1993 – 9 August 1993
- Prime Minister: Kiichi Miyazawa
- Preceded by: Mamoru Nakajima; Kiichi Miyazawa (acting)
- Succeeded by: Satsuki Eda

Member of the House of Representatives
- In office 7 October 1979 – 27 September 1996
- Preceded by: Seiichi Ikehata
- Succeeded by: Constituency abolished
- Constituency: Hokkaido 4th

Member of the Hokkaido Legislative Assembly
- In office 1963–1975

Personal details
- Born: 21 April 1930 Bibai, Hokkaido, Japan
- Died: 29 September 2000 (aged 70)
- Party: Liberal Democratic
- Children: Kōichi Watanabe
- Education: Chuo University

Shōichi Watanabe (Japanese: 渡辺省一) (April 21, 1930 – September 29, 2000) was a Japanese politician. He served in the House of Representatives of Japan as part of the multi-member constituency Hokkaido's 4th district alongside Yukio Hatoyama and Tadamasa Kodaira. He was a member of the Liberal Democratic Party of Japan.

== Bibliography ==
- 日外アソシエーツ編『政治家人名事典』（紀伊国屋書店、1990年）
