= Atsushi Nonaka =

Japanese politician (born 1976)

- 野中 厚
- Official portrait, 2024

Member of the House of Representatives; from Northern Kanto
- Incumbent
- Assumed office 16 December 2012
- Preceded by: Hiranao Honda
- Constituency: Saitama 12th (2012–2021); PR block (2021–2026); Saitama 12th (2026–present)

Member of the Saitama Prefectural Assembly
- In office 2007–2012
- Constituency: Kuki City

Personal details
- Born: 17 November 1976 (age 49) Kazo, Saitama, Japan
- Party: Liberal Democratic
- Education: Keio University

Atsushi Nonaka (野中 厚, Nonaka Atsushi; born 17 November 1976) is a Japanese politician and a member of the House of Representatives.

== Early life and career ==
Nonaka was born in Kazo City, Saitama Prefecture. After graduating from Kuki City Honmachi Elementary School, Keio Junior High School, and Keio Senior High School, he graduated from the Faculty of Commerce at Keio University in 2004. In June 2005, he joined Saireki Construction Industry Company, where his relatives are representative directors.

== Political career ==
In April 2007, he ran as an independent in the Saitama Prefectural Assembly election and won a seat for the first time. After winning the election, he received additional nominations from the LDP and joined the party. In April 2011, he ran in the Saitama Prefectural Assembly election with the LDP's official approval and was re-elected without a vote.

In 2012, he ran in the 2012 Japanese general election from Saitama 12th district with the LDP's official approval. Toshikazu Morita, a member of the Saitama prefectural assembly, also announced his intention to nominate the LDP for Saitama 12th district, but since Nonaka received the nomination, he ran as an independent. Nonaka was elected in Saitama 12th district after defeating Morita and Hiranao Honda, the former Democratic Party of Japan's former parliamentary secretary for Economy, Trade and Industry.

In the 2014 Japanese general election, he ran in Saitama 12th district as an official LDP candidate. Although Toshikazu Morita, who ran for the PFG, appointed a former member of the LDP as the top adviser to the camp to expand the support of the conservatives, Nonaka won.

In 2017, he was appointed Parliamentary Secretary to the Minister of Agriculture, Forestry and Fisheries in the Third Abe Cabinet Third Reshuffled Cabinet. In the 2017 Japanese general election in the same year, he ran from Saitama 12th district as LDP and defeated Morita Toshikazu, who ran from the Kibō no Tō, by 492 votes. He was reappointed as Parliamentary Secretary to the Minister of Agriculture, Forestry and Fisheries in the Fourth Abe Cabinet, which was established after the election.

In the 2021 Japanese general election, veteran party members such as Shigeru Ishiba, Yuko Obuchi, and Toshimitsu Motegi prematurely celebrated his re-election, but lost to Morita, who won the race by a narrow margin. The Northern Kanto proportional representation block, which had been duplicated, revived proportionally, and was selected for the fourth time.
