= Kaori Maruya =

Japanese politician (born 1965)

- 丸谷 佳織
- Official portrait, 2001

Member of the House of Representatives
- In office 20 October 1996 – 21 July 2009
- Preceded by: Constituency established
- Succeeded by: Hisashi Inatsu
- Constituency: Hokkaido PR

Personal details
- Born: 6 June 1965 (age 61) Sapporo, Hokkaido, Japan
- Party: Komeito
- Other political affiliations: NFP (1996–1998)
- Education: Fuji Women's University

Kaori Maruya (丸谷 佳織, Maruya Kaori; born 6 June 1965) is a Japanese politician of the New Komeito Party, a member of the House of Representatives in the Diet (national legislature). A native of Sapporo, Hokkaido and graduate of Fuji Women's University, she was elected to the House of Representatives for the first time in 1996.
