= Seiichi Kaneta =

Japanese politician (1947–2023)

- 金田 誠一
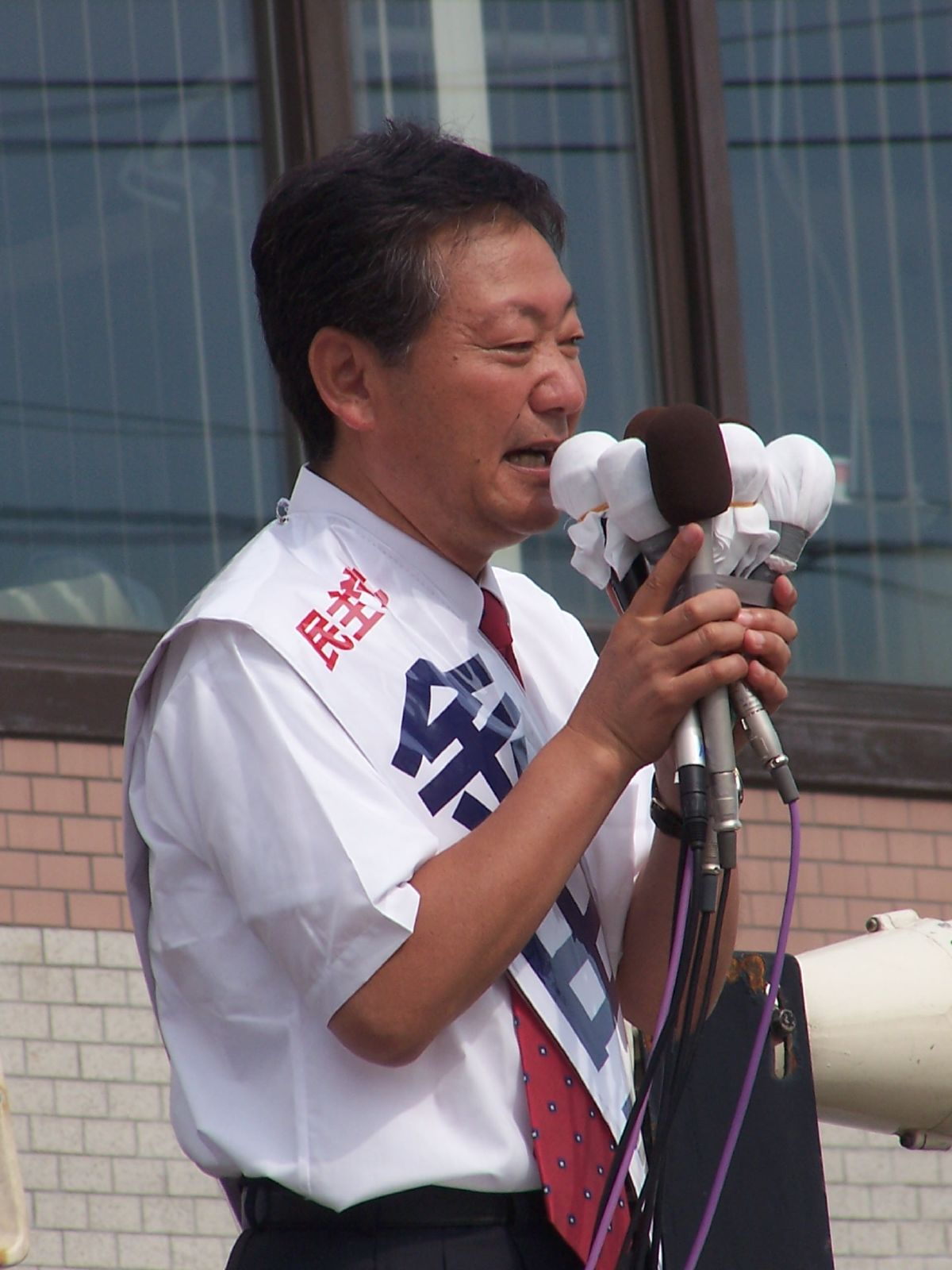
- Kaneta in 2005

Member of the House of Representatives
- In office 19 July 1993 – 21 July 2009
- Preceded by: Fumio Abe
- Succeeded by: Seiji Osaka
- Constituency: Hokkaido 3rd (1993–1996); Hokkaido PR (1996–2003); Hokkaido 8th (2003–2009)

Member of the Hakodate City Council
- In office April 1979 – June 1993

Personal details
- Born: 28 September 1947 Kikonai, Hokkaido, Japan
- Died: 10 March 2023 (aged 75) Hakodate, Hokkaido, Japan
- Party: Democratic
- Other political affiliations: JSP (1993–1996); NPS (1996–1998)

Seiichi Kaneta (金田 誠一, Kaneta Seiichi; 28 September 1947 – 10 March 2023) was a Japanese politician of the Democratic Party of Japan, who served as a member of the House of Representatives in the Diet (national legislature).

== Early life ==
Kaneta was a native of Kamiiso District, Hokkaidō and a high school graduate. He joined the city government of Hakodate, Hokkaidō in 1966.

== Political career ==
After having served in the city assembly of Hakodate for four terms from 1979, he was elected to the House of Representatives for the first time in 1993 as an independent with an endorsement from the Japan Socialist Party.
