= Hiroshi Imazu =

Japanese politician

- 今津 寛
- Official portrait, 2004

Member of the House of Representatives
- In office October 2010 – 28 September 2017
- Preceded by: Nobutaka Machimura
- Succeeded by: Multi-member district
- Constituency: Hokkaido PR (2010–2012); Hokkaido 6th (2012–2014); Hokkaido PR (2014–2017)
- In office 9 November 2003 – 21 July 2009
- Preceded by: Hidenori Sasaki
- Succeeded by: Multi-member district
- Constituency: Hokkaido 6th (2003–2005); Hokkaido PR (2005–2009)
- In office 18 February 1990 – 27 September 1996
- Preceded by: Masanori Kawata
- Succeeded by: Constituency abolished
- Constituency: Hokkaido 2nd

Member of the Hokkaido Legislative Assembly
- In office 1983–1990
- Constituency: Asahikawa City

Member of the Asahikawa City Council
- In office 1975–1983

Personal details
- Born: 30 September 1946 (age 80) Asahikawa, Hokkaido, Japan
- Party: Liberal Democratic
- Other political affiliations: NFP (1994–1996)
- Children: Hirosuke Imazu
- Education: Chuo University

Hiroshi Imazu (今津 寛, Imazu Hiroshi; born 30 September 1946) is a former Japanese politician of the Liberal Democratic Party, who served as a member of the House of Representatives in the Diet (national legislature). A native of Asahikawa on Hokkaido and graduate of Chuo University, he was elected to the first of his two terms in the city assembly of Asahikawa in 1975, to the first of his two terms in the Hokkaido Prefectural Assembly in 1983 and finally to the House of Representatives for the first time in 1990. Imazu is affiliated to the revisionist lobby Nippon Kaigi. After failing to win a seat in the 2017 Japanese general election he retired from politics. His son is Hirosuke Imazu, who became the mayor of Asahikawa in 2021.
