= Toshio Kojima =

Japanese politician (born 1939)

- 小島 敏男
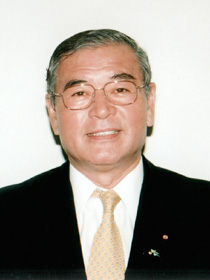
- Official portrait, 2004

Member of the House of Representatives; from Northern Kanto
- In office 21 January 1999 – 21 July 2009
- Preceded by: Yōjirō Nakajima
- Succeeded by: Hiranao Honda
- Constituency: PR block (1999–2000); Saitama 12th (2000–2003); PR block (2003–2005); Saitama 12th (2005–2009)

Personal details
- Born: 11 November 1939 (age 86) Kumagaya, Saitama, Japan
- Party: Liberal Democratic
- Education: Chuo University

Toshio Kojima (小島 敏男, Kojima Toshio; born 11 November 1939) is a retired Japanese politician of the Liberal Democratic Party, who served as a member of the House of Representatives in the Diet (national legislature). A native of Kumagaya, Saitama and graduate of Chuo University, he had served in the city assembly of Kumagaya for three terms since 1971 and in the assembly of Saitama Prefecture for four terms since 1983. He was elected to the House of Representatives for the first time in 1999.
