= Tadamasa Kodaira =

Japanese politician

- 小平 忠正
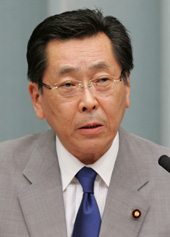
- Kodaira in 2012

Chairman of the National Public Safety Commission
- In office 1 October 2012 – 26 December 2012
- Prime Minister: Yoshihiko Noda
- Preceded by: Jin Matsubara
- Succeeded by: Keiji Furuya

Member of the House of Representatives
- In office 18 February 1990 – 16 November 2012
- Preceded by: Tatsuo Takahashi
- Succeeded by: Hisashi Inatsu
- Constituency: Hokkaido 4th (1990–1996); Hokkaido 10th (1996–2012)

Personal details
- Born: 18 March 1942 (age 84) Sorachi, Hokkaido, Japan
- Party: Democratic
- Other political affiliations: DSP (1990–1994); NFP (1994–1995); NPS (1995–1996); DP (1996–1998)
- Children: 3
- Parent: Tadashi Kodaira (father)
- Education: Keio University; Georgetown University

Tadamasa Kodaira (小平 忠正, Kodaira Tadamasa; born 18 March 1942) is a former Japanese politician of the Democratic Party of Japan, who served as a member of the House of Representatives in the Diet (national legislature).

== Early life and education ==
Kodaira is a native of Iwamizawa, Hokkaidō and graduated from Keio University in Tokyo. Prior to going into politics, he ran a ranch.

== Political career ==
Kodaira was elected to the House of Reoresentatives for the first time in 1990, and served until 2012. He represented the Hokkaido 4th constituency from 1990 to 1996, and the Hokkaido 10th from 1996 to 2012.

In the first cabinet reshuffle of Prime Minister Yoshihiko Noda on 1 October 2012, Kodaira was appointed Chairman of the National Public Safety Commission, Minister of State for Consumer Affairs and Food Safety, taking over from Jin Matsubara.

== Election history ==
Election	Age	District	Political party	Number of votes	election results
1990 Japanese general election	47	Hokkaido 4th district	DSP	85,210	winning
1993 Japanese general election	51	Hokkaido 4th district	DSP	71,993	winning
1996 Japanese general election	54	Hokkaido 10th district	DPJ	100,489	winning
2000 Japanese general election	58	Hokkaido 10th district	DPJ	106,221	winning
2003 Japanese general election	61	Hokkaido 10th district	DPJ	121,516	winning
2005 Japanese general election	63	Hokkaido 10th district	DPJ	109,422	winning
2009 Japanese general election	67	Hokkaido 10th district	DPJ	159,473	winning
2012 Japanese general election	70	Hokkaido 10th district	DPJ	62,998	lost
