= Hisashi Inatsu =

Japanese politician (born 1958)

- 稲津 久
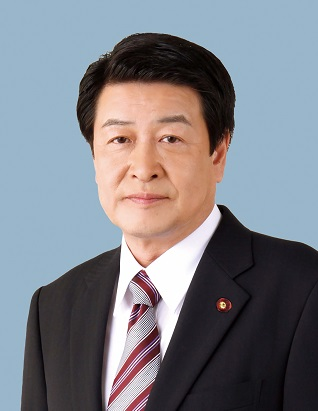
- Official portrait, 2019

Member of the House of Representatives
- In office 31 August 2009 – 9 October 2024
- Preceded by: Kaori Maruya
- Succeeded by: Hiroshi Kamiya
- Constituency: Hokkaido PR (2009–2012); Hokkaido 10th (2012–2024)

Member of the Hokkaido Legislative Assembly
- In office 1999–2009
- Constituency: Sorachi Subprefecture

Personal details
- Born: 9 February 1958 (age 68) Ashibetsu, Hokkaido, Japan
- Party: Komeito
- Education: Senshu University

Hisashi Inatsu (born 9 February 1958) is a former Japanese politician from Komeito who represented Hokkaido 10th district in the House of Representatives. He served as the deputy minister of health in the Second Kishida Cabinet.
