= Hokkaido proportional representation block =

Japanese House of Representatives constituency

Hokkaidō Proportional Representation Block
- Parliamentary constituency for the Japanese House of Representatives
- Map of House of Representatives proportional blocks, with the Hokkaidō block highlighted
- Prefecture: Hokkaidō
- Electorate: 4,321,464 (2026)

Current constituency
- Created: 1994
- Number of members: 8

The Hokkaidō proportional representation block (Japanese: 比例[代表]北海道ブロック, Hepburn: Hirei [daihyō] Hokkaidō burokku) or in official usage the "Hokkaidō electoral district" (北海道選挙区, Hokkaidō senkyo-ku) is one of eleven proportional representation (PR) blocks for the House of Representatives in the Diet of Japan. It consists of Hokkaidō and is one of two PR blocks that covers only one prefecture, the other being Tokyo. Following the introduction of proportional voting, it elected nine representatives in the election of 1996. Since 2000, the Hokkaidō PR block has been represented by eight representatives.

== Results timeline ==
=== Vote share ===
| Party | 1996 | 2000 | 2003 | 2005 | 2009 | 2012 | 2014 | 2017 | 2021 | 2024 | 2026 |
|---|---|---|---|---|---|---|---|---|---|---|---|
| LDP | 28.20 | 25.56 | 31.03 | 29.14 | 24.24 | 26.44 | 29.79 | 28.81 | 33.60 | 26.78 | 37.01 |
| DPJ (Note: 1996 DP) | 31.80 | 31.24 | 40.82 | 33.79 | 40.55 | 18.23 | 27.56 | | | | |
| NFP | 21.05 | | | | | | | | | | |
| JCP | 15.11 | 12.69 | 8.97 | 7.48 | 7.26 | 6.99 | 12.09 | 8.51 | 8.06 | 7.09 | 5.44 |
| Komeito | | 12.80 | 13.97 | 11.42 | 10.67 | 11.04 | 12.30 | 11.03 | 11.46 | 10.58 | |
| SDP | | 8.87 | 5.21 | 4.73 | 3.42 | 1.85 | 2.14 | 1.38 | 1.61 | 1.30 | 1.29 |
| LP | | 8.21 | | | | | | | | | |
| Daichi | | | | 13.44 | 13.03 | 13.25 | | 8.37 | | | |
| Ishin (Note: 2012 JRP, 2014 JIP) | | | | | | 12.75 | 9.89 | 2.76 | 8.38 | 4.05 | 3.81 |
| Your | | | | | | 5.94 | | | | | |
| TPJ | | | | | | 3.13 | | | | | |
| CDP | | | | | | | | 26.38 | 26.58 | 29.01 | |
| KnT | | | | | | | | 12.25 | | | |
| Reiwa | | | | | | | | | 3.97 | 7.42 | 3.09 |
| DPFP | | | | | | | | | 2.87 | 8.03 | 8.88 |
| CPJ | | | | | | | | | | 2.59 | 2.44 |
| Sanseitō | | | | | | | | | | 2.38 | 6.63 |
| CRA | | | | | | | | | | | 24.60 |
| Mirai | | | | | | | | | | | 5.46 |
| Others | 3.84 (Note: NSP 3.84) | 0.63 | | | 0.83 (Note: HRP 0.61, Essence 0.22) | 0.40 (Note: HRP 0.40) | 6.22 (Note: No Party Support 4.19, Generations 1.53, HRP 0.49) | 0.52 (Note: HRP 0.52) | 3.47 (Note: No Party Support 1.80, NHK 1.67) | 0.77 (Note: Euthanasia 0.77) | 1.33 (Note: Genyu 1.33) |
| Turnout | | 65.52 | 62.93 | 71.01 | 73.63 | 58.72 | 56.34 | 60.29 | 58.78 | 56.15 | 57.92 |

=== Seat distribution ===
| Election | Distribution | Seats |
|---|---|---|
| 1996 | | 9 |
| 2000 | | 8 |
| 2003 | | 8 |
| 2005 | | 8 |
| 2009 | | 8 |
| 2012 | | 8 |
| 2014 | | 8 |
| 2017 | | 8 |
| 2021 | | 8 |
| 2024 | | 8 |
| 2026 | | 8 |

== List of members ==
| # | 1996 | | | 2000 | | 2003 | | | 2005 | | | 2009 | | |
|---|---|---|---|---|---|---|---|---|---|---|---|---|---|---|
| 1 | Seiichi Ikehata | | DP | Kenji Nakazawa | DPJ | Hidenori Sasaki | | DPJ | Seiji Osaka | | DPJ | Hiroko Nakano | | DPJ |
| 2 | Muneo Suzuki | | LDP | Muneo Suzuki | LDP | Eiko Kaneta | | LDP | Yukari Iijima | | LDP | Tsutomu Takebe | | LDP |
| 3 | Toshiyuki Wanibuchi | | NFP | Seiichi Kaneta | DPJ | Chiyomi Kobayashi | | DPJ | Satoshi Arai (Note: Resigned) | Tomohiro Ishikawa (Note: Succeeded 27 Mar 2007) | DPJ | Maya Yamazaki | | DPJ |
| 4 | Kenji Nakazawa | | DP | Kaori Maruya | Komei | Gaku Ishizaki | | LDP | Hiroshi Imazu | | LDP | Tatsumaru Yamaoka | | DPJ |
| 5 | Kenji Kodama | | JCP | Kenji Kodama | JCP | Kaori Maruya | | Komei | Muneo Suzuki | | Daichi | Muneo Suzuki (Note: Deprived of office) | Takahiro Asano (Note: Succeeded 29 Sep 2010) | Daichi |
| 6 | Takamori Yoshikawa | | LDP | Hirofumi Iwakura | LDP | Hiroko Nakano | | DPJ | Kaori Maruya | | Komei | Nobutaka Machimura | Hiroshi Imazu (Note: Succeeded 6 Oct 2010) | LDP |
| 7 | Seiichi Kaneta | | DP | Wakio Mitsui | DPJ | Takafumi Yamashita | | LDP | Kenko Matsuki | | DPJ | Hisashi Inatsu | | Komei |
| 8 | Kaori Maruya | | NFP | Keiko Yamauchi | SDP | Kenko Matsuki | | DPJ | Takamori Yoshikawa | | LDP | Hitomi Kudo | | DPJ |
| 9 | Kokou Sato | | LDP | Abolished | | | | | | | | | | |
| # | 2012 | | | 2014 | | 2017 | | | 2021 | | | 2024 | | |
| 1 | Kōichi Watanabe | | LDP | Kōichi Watanabe | LDP | Kōichi Watanabe | | LDP | Takako Suzuki | | LDP | Naoko Shinoda | | CDP |
| 2 | Takahiro Yokomichi | | DPJ | Takako Suzuki | DPJ | Hiroshi Kamiya | | CDP | Kureha Otsuki | | CDP | Yoshitaka Itō | | LDP |
| 3 | Tomohiro Ishikawa | Takako Suzuki (Note: Succeeded 3 Jun 2013) | Daichi | Hiroshi Imazu | LDP | Takako Suzuki | | LDP | Kōichi Watanabe | | LDP | Masahito Nishikawa | | CDP |
| 4 | Seiichi Shimizu | | LDP | Satoshi Arai | DPJ | Maki Ikeda | | CDP | Yutaka Arai | | CDP | Hiroyuki Nakamura | | LDP |
| 5 | Miho Takahashi | | JRP | Hidemichi Satō | Komei | Tatsumaru Yamaoka | | KnT | Hidemichi Satō | | Komei | Hidemichi Satō | | Komei |
| 6 | Hidemichi Satō | | Komei | Kazuya Hatayama | JCP | Hidemichi Satō | | Komei | Manabu Horii | Yūsuke Takahashi (Note: Succeeded 18 Sep 2024) | LDP | Eisei Kawaharada | | CDP |
| 7 | Satoshi Arai | | DPJ | Kazuo Maeda | LDP | Toshimitsu Funabashi | | LDP | Hiroshi Kamiya | | CDP | Jun Mukōyama | | LDP |
| 8 | Shigeaki Katsunuma | | LDP | Kenko Matsuki | JIP | Hiranao Honda | Maya Yamazaki (Note: Succeeded 10 Aug 2021) | CDP | Yūko Nakagawa | | LDP | Hidetake Usuki | | DPFP |
| # | 2026 | | | | | | | | | | | | | |
| 1 | Yoshitaka Itō | | LDP | | | | | | | | | | | |
| 2 | Hidemichi Satō | | CRA | | | | | | | | | | | |
| 3 | Kōichi Watanabe | | LDP | | | | | | | | | | | |
| 4 | Nagisa Muraki | | LDP | | | | | | | | | | | |
| 5 | Tomoko Ukishima | | CRA | | | | | | | | | | | |
| 6 | Yuri Yoshida | | LDP | | | | | | | | | | | |
| 7 | Hidetake Usuki | | DPFP | | | | | | | | | | | |
| 8 | Tatsumaru Yamaoka | | CRA | | | | | | | | | | | |

== Election results ==
=== 2026 ===
2026 results in the Hokkaido PR block
| Party | Votes | Swing | % | Seats | +/– |
|---|---|---|---|---|---|
| Liberal Democratic Party (LDP) | 911,742 | 37.01 | ▲10.23 | 4 | ▲1 |
| Centrist Reform Alliance (CRA) (Note: Swings compared to CDP and Komeito) | 605,889 | 24.60 | ▼14.99 | 3 | ▼1 |
| Democratic Party For the People (DPFP) | 218,850 | 8.88 | ▲0.85 | 1 | 0 |
| Sanseitō | 163,329 | 6.63 | ▲4.25 | 0 | 0 |
| Team Mirai | 134,613 | 5.46 | New | 0 | New |
| Japanese Communist Party (JCP) | 134,084 | 5.44 | ▼1.65 | 0 | 0 |
| Japan Innovation Party (Ishin) | 93,967 | 3.81 | ▼0.24 | 0 | 0 |
| Reiwa Shinsengumi (Reiwa) | 76,099 | 3.09 | ▼4.33 | 0 | 0 |
| Conservative Party of Japan (CPJ) | 60,119 | 2.44 | ▼0.15 | 0 | 0 |
| Tax Cuts Japan and Yukoku Alliance (Genyu) | 32,878 | 1.33 | New | 0 | New |
| Social Democratic Party (SDP) | 31,753 | 1.29 | ▼0.01 | 0 | 0 |
| Total | 2,463,323 | 100.00 | | 8 | |
| Invalid votes | 39,650 | 1.58 | | | |
| Turnout | 2,502,973 | 57.92 | ▲1.77 | | |
| Registered voters | 4,321,464 | | | | |

=== 2024 ===
2024 results in the Hokkaido PR block
| Party | Votes | Swing | % | Seats | +/– |
|---|---|---|---|---|---|
| Constitutional Democratic Party of Japan (CDP) | 694,578 | 29.01 | ▲2.43 | 3 | 0 |
| Liberal Democratic Party (LDP) | 641,127 | 26.78 | ▼6.82 | 3 | ▼1 |
| Komeito | 253,344 | 10.58 | ▼0.88 | 1 | 0 |
| Democratic Party For the People (DPFP) | 192,303 | 8.03 | ▲5.16 | 1 | ▲1 |
| Reiwa Shinsengumi (Reiwa) | 177,620 | 7.42 | ▲3.45 | 0 | 0 |
| Japanese Communist Party (JCP) | 169,799 | 7.09 | ▼0.97 | 0 | 0 |
| Japan Innovation Party (Ishin) | 96,954 | 4.05 | ▼4.33 | 0 | 0 |
| Conservative Party of Japan (CPJ) | 61,903 | 2.59 | New | 0 | New |
| Sanseitō | 57,002 | 2.38 | New | 0 | New |
| Social Democratic Party (SDP) | 31,134 | 1.30 | ▼0.31 | 0 | 0 |
| Consideration the Euthanasia System | 18,455 | 0.77 | ▼1.03 | 0 | 0 |
| Total | 2,394,219 | 100.00 | | 8 | |
| Invalid votes | 60,780 | 2.48 | | | |
| Turnout | 2,454,999 | 56.15 | ▼2.64 | | |
| Registered voters | 4,372,575 | | | | |

=== 2021 ===
2021 results in the Hokkaido PR block
| Party | Votes | Swing | % | Seats | +/– |
|---|---|---|---|---|---|
| Liberal Democratic Party (LDP) | 863,300 | 33.60 | ▲4.79 | 4 | ▲1 |
| Constitutional Democratic Party of Japan (CDP) | 682,912 | 26.58 | ▲0.20 | 3 | 0 |
| Komeito | 294,371 | 11.46 | ▲0.43 | 1 | 0 |
| Japan Innovation Party (Ishin) | 215,344 | 8.38 | ▲5.62 | 0 | 0 |
| Japanese Communist Party (JCP) | 207,189 | 8.06 | ▼0.45 | 0 | 0 |
| Reiwa Shinsengumi (Reiwa) | 102,086 | 3.97 | New | 0 | New |
| Democratic Party For the People (DPFP) | 73,621 | 2.87 | New | 0 | New |
| No Party Support | 46,142 | 1.80 | New | 0 | New |
| NHK Party | 42,916 | 1.67 | New | 0 | New |
| Social Democratic Party (SDP) | 41,248 | 1.61 | ▲0.23 | 0 | 0 |
| Total | 2,569,129 | 100.00 | | 8 | |
| Invalid votes | 66,706 | 2.53 | | | |
| Turnout | 2,635,835 | 58.78 | ▼1.51 | | |
| Registered voters | 4,484,166 | | | | |

=== 2017 ===
2017 results in the Hokkaido PR block
| Party | Votes | Swing | % | Seats | +/– |
|---|---|---|---|---|---|
| Liberal Democratic Party (LDP) | 779,903 | 28.81 | ▼0.98 | 3 | 0 |
| Constitutional Democratic Party of Japan (CDP) | 714,032 | 26.38 | New | 3 | New |
| Kibō no Tō | 331,463 | 12.25 | New | 1 | New |
| Komeito | 298,573 | 11.03 | ▼1.27 | 1 | 0 |
| Japanese Communist Party (JCP) | 230,316 | 8.51 | ▼3.58 | 0 | ▼1 |
| Japan Innovation Party (Ishin) | 74,701 | 2.76 | New | 0 | New |
| Social Democratic Party (SDP) | 37,374 | 1.38 | ▼0.76 | 0 | 0 |
| New Party Daichi | 226,552 | 8.37 | New | 0 | New |
| Happiness Realization Party (HRP) | 13,983 | 0.52 | ▲0.03 | 0 | 0 |
| Total | 2,706,897 | 100.00 | | 8 | |
| Invalid votes | 57,224 | 2.07 | | | |
| Turnout | 2,764,121 | 60.29 | ▲3.95 | | |
| Registered voters | 4,584,480 | | | | |

=== 2014 ===
2014 results in the Hokkaido PR block
| Party | Votes | Swing | % | Seats | +/– |
|---|---|---|---|---|---|
| Liberal Democratic Party (LDP) | 744,748 | 29.79 | ▲3.35 | 3 | 0 |
| Democratic Party of Japan (DPJ) | 688,922 | 27.56 | ▲9.33 | 2 | 0 |
| Komeito | 307,534 | 12.30 | ▲1.26 | 1 | 0 |
| Japanese Communist Party (JCP) | 302,251 | 12.09 | ▲5.10 | 1 | ▲1 |
| Japan Innovation Party (JIP) | 247,342 | 9.89 | ▼2.86 | 1 | 0 |
| Social Democratic Party (SDP) | 53,604 | 2.14 | ▲0.29 | 0 | 0 |
| No Party Support | 104,854 | 4.19 | New | 0 | New |
| Party for Future Generations | 38,342 | 1.53 | New | 0 | New |
| Happiness Realization Party (HRP) | 12,267 | 0.49 | ▲0.09 | 0 | 0 |
| Total | 2,499,864 | 100.00 | | 8 | |
| Invalid votes | 62,292 | 2.43 | | | |
| Turnout | 2,562,156 | 56.34 | ▼2.38 | | |
| Registered voters | 4,547,668 | | | | |

=== 2012 ===
2012 results in the Hokkaido PR block
| Party | Votes | Swing | % | Seats | +/– |
|---|---|---|---|---|---|
| Liberal Democratic Party (LDP) | 692,304 | 26.44 | ▲2.20 | 3 | ▲1 |
| Democratic Party of Japan (DPJ) | 477,356 | 18.23 | ▼22.32 | 2 | ▼2 |
| New Party Daichi | 346,858 | 13.25 | ▲0.22 | 1 | 0 |
| Japan Restoration Party (JRP) | 333,760 | 12.75 | New | 1 | New |
| Komeito | 289,011 | 11.04 | ▲0.37 | 1 | 0 |
| Japanese Communist Party (JCP) | 182,968 | 6.99 | ▼0.27 | 0 | 0 |
| Your Party | 155,522 | 5.94 | New | 0 | New |
| Tomorrow Party of Japan (TPJ) | 81,838 | 3.13 | New | 0 | New |
| Social Democratic Party (SDP) | 48,351 | 1.85 | ▼1.56 | 0 | 0 |
| Happiness Realization Party (HRP) | 10,506 | 0.40 | ▼0.21 | 0 | 0 |
| Total | 2,618,474 | 100.00 | | 8 | |
| Invalid votes | 68,557 | 2.55 | | | |
| Turnout | 2,687,031 | 58.72 | ▼14.91 | | |
| Registered voters | 4,575,652 | | | | |

=== 2009 ===
2009 results in the Hokkaido PR block
| Party | Votes | Swing | % | Seats | +/– |
|---|---|---|---|---|---|
| Democratic Party of Japan (DPJ) | 1,348,318 | 40.55 | ▲6.76 | 4 | ▲1 |
| Liberal Democratic Party (LDP) | 805,895 | 24.24 | ▼4.90 | 2 | ▼1 |
| New Party Daichi | 433,122 | 13.03 | ▼0.41 | 1 | 0 |
| Komeito | 354,886 | 10.67 | ▼0.75 | 1 | 0 |
| Japanese Communist Party (JCP) | 241,345 | 7.26 | ▼0.22 | 0 | 0 |
| Social Democratic Party (SDP) | 113,562 | 3.42 | ▼1.31 | 0 | 0 |
| Happiness Realization Party (HRP) | 20,276 | 0.61 | New | 0 | New |
| New Party Essence | 7,399 | 0.22 | New | 0 | New |
| Total | 3,324,803 | 100.00 | | 8 | |
| Invalid votes | 66,400 | 1.96 | | | |
| Turnout | 3,391,203 | 73.63 | ▲2.62 | | |
| Registered voters | 4,605,761 | | | | |

=== 2005 ===
2005 results in the Hokkaido PR block
| Party | Votes | Swing | % | Seats | +/– |
|---|---|---|---|---|---|
| Democratic Party of Japan (DPJ) | 1,090,727 | 33.79 | ▼7.02 | 3 | ▼1 |
| Liberal Democratic Party (LDP) | 940,705 | 29.14 | ▼1.89 | 3 | 0 |
| New Party Daichi | 433,938 | 13.44 | New | 1 | New |
| Komeito | 368,552 | 11.42 | ▼2.55 | 1 | 0 |
| Japanese Communist Party (JCP) | 241,371 | 7.48 | ▼1.49 | 0 | 0 |
| Social Democratic Party (SDP) | 152,646 | 4.73 | ▼0.48 | 0 | 0 |
| Total | 3,227,939 | 100.00 | | 8 | |
| Invalid votes | 68,607 | 2.08 | | | |
| Turnout | 3,296,546 | 71.01 | ▲8.08 | | |
| Registered voters | 4,642,310 | | | | |

=== 2003 ===
2003 results in the Hokkaido PR block
| Party | Votes | Swing | % | Seats | +/– |
|---|---|---|---|---|---|
| Democratic Party of Japan (DPJ) | 1,153,471 | 40.82 | ▲9.58 | 4 | ▲1 |
| Liberal Democratic Party (LDP) | 876,653 | 31.03 | ▲5.47 | 3 | ▲1 |
| Komeito | 394,843 | 13.97 | ▲1.17 | 1 | 0 |
| Japanese Communist Party (JCP) | 253,442 | 8.97 | ▼3.72 | 0 | ▼1 |
| Social Democratic Party (SDP) | 147,146 | 5.21 | ▼3.66 | 0 | ▼1 |
| Total | 2,825,555 | 100.00 | | 8 | |
| Invalid votes | 88,424 | 3.03 | | | |
| Turnout | 2,913,979 | 62.93 | ▼2.59 | | |
| Registered voters | 4,630,154 | | | | |

=== 2000 ===
2000 results in the Hokkaido PR block
| Party | Votes | Swing | % | Seats | +/– |
|---|---|---|---|---|---|
| Democratic Party of Japan (DPJ) | 898,678 | 31.24 | ▼0.56 | 3 | 0 |
| Liberal Democratic Party (LDP) | 735,318 | 25.56 | ▼2.64 | 2 | ▼1 |
| Komeito | 368,198 | 12.80 | New | 1 | New |
| Japanese Communist Party (JCP) | 365,061 | 12.69 | ▼2.42 | 1 | 0 |
| Social Democratic Party (SDP) | 255,319 | 8.87 | New | 1 | New |
| Liberal Party (LP) | 236,301 | 8.21 | New | 0 | New |
| Liberal League (LL) | 17,987 | 0.63 | New | 0 | New |
| Total | 2,876,862 | 100.00 | | 8 | ▼1 |
| Invalid votes | 122,134 | 4.07 | | | |
| Turnout | 2,998,996 | 65.52 | | | |
| Registered voters | 4,577,169 | | | | |

=== 1996 ===
1996 results in the Hokkaido PR block
| Party | Votes | % | Seats |
|---|---|---|---|
| Democratic Party (DP) | 835,042 | 31.80 | 3 |
| Liberal Democratic Party (LDP) | 740,677 | 28.20 | 3 |
| New Frontier Party (NFP) | 552,847 | 21.05 | 2 |
| Japanese Communist Party (JCP) | 396,923 | 15.11 | 1 |
| New Socialist Party (NSP) | 100,807 | 3.84 | 0 |
| Total | 2,626,296 | 100.00 | 9 |
