= Results of the 2021 Japanese general election =

- 31 October 2021
- All 465 seats in the House of Representatives; 233 seats needed for a majority
Party	Leader	Seats	+/–
LDP	Fumio Kishida	259	−25
CDP	Yukio Edano	96	New
Ishin	Ichirō Matsui	41	+30
Komeito	Natsuo Yamaguchi	32	+3
DPP	Yuichiro Tamaki	11	New
JCP	Kazuo Shii	10	−2
Reiwa	Tarō Yamamoto	3	New
Social Democratic	Mizuho Fukushima	1	−1
Independents	—	12	−10
This lists parties that won seats. See the complete results below.
- Constituency seats
- All 289 seats
- Turnout: 55.98% (▲2.30pp)
Party	Vote %	Seats	+/–
LDP	48.08	187	−31
CDP	29.96	57	New
Ishin	8.36	16	+13
JCP	4.59	1	0
DPP	2.17	6	New
Komeito	1.52	9	+1
Social Democratic	0.55	1	0
Independents	3.95	12	−10
This lists parties that won seats. See the complete results below.
- Proportional seats
- All 176 seats
- Turnout: 55.97% (▲2.29pp)
Party	Vote %	Seats	+/–
LDP	34.66	72	+6
CDP	20.00	39	New
Ishin	14.01	25	+17
Komeito	12.38	23	+2
JCP	7.25	9	−2
DPP	4.51	5	New
Reiwa	3.86	3	New
Social Democratic	1.77	0	−1
This lists parties that won seats. See the complete results below.
Results by constituency shaded according to vote strength
Prime Minister before	Prime Minister after election
Fumio Kishida; LDP	Fumio Kishida; LDP

This article presents detailed results of the 2021 Japanese general election. The results are separated into each of the eleven proportional representation blocks and their corresponding prefectures. In the following tables, candidates elected via single-member district are highlighted in green, while candidates elected via proportional representation are highlighted in red.

== Electoral system ==
The House of Representatives is elected via parallel voting. In the 2021 election, 289 members were elected in single-member districts and 176 via party-list proportional representation in eleven multi-member constituencies, referred to as "PR blocks". Single-member districts are apportioned between prefectures and numbered (1st, 2nd, etc). Candidates may run solely in a single-member district, solely in PR, or both (dual listing). Dual listed candidates must win at least 10% of the vote in their single-member district in order to be eligible for election via PR. Dual listed candidates who win their single-member district race are not eligible for election via PR.

Candidates on PR lists may be ranked sequentially or, if they are dual listed, ranked equally with one another. If ranked equally, the best-loser ratio (sekihairitsu) of each candidate determines the order of election. This number is determined by dividing their single-member district votes by those of the winning candidate in that district. In this way, the losing candidates who performed best will be elected first.

If a party wins more PR seats than they have eligible candidates on their list, the unfilled seats will be distributed to other parties in accordance with the PR formula.

== Hokkaidō block ==
2021 Japanese general election in Hokkaido
- 31 October 2021

All 20 seats to the House of Representatives
	Majority party	Minority party	Third party
Party	LDP	CDP	Komeito
Last election	9 seats	8 seats (Note: CDP and Kibō no Tō)	2 seats
Constituency	6	4	1
PR seats	4	3	1
Total	10	8	2
Seat change	▲1	0	0

Single-member constituency results in Hokkaido
Constituency	Previous member		Elected member		Votes	%	Margin	Runner-up	Party	%	Status
Hokkaido 1st	Daiki Michishita	CDP	Daiki Michishita	CDP	118,286	45.3	11,301	Toshimitsu Funabashi	LDP	41.0	CDP hold
Hokkaido 2nd	Kenko Matsuki	CDP	Kenko Matsuki	CDP	105,807	44.7	16,062	Yūsuke Takahashi	LDP	37.9	LDP hold
Hokkaido 3rd	Satoshi Arai	CDP	Hirohisa Takagi	LDP	116,917	44.7	4,382	Yutaka Arai	CDP	43.0	LDP gain from CDP
Hokkaido 4th	Hiroyuki Nakamura	LDP	Hiroyuki Nakamura	LDP	109,326	50.2	696	Kureha Otsuki	CDP	49.8	LDP hold
Hokkaido 5th	Yoshiaki Wada	LDP	Yoshiaki Wada	LDP	139,950	50.6	28,584	Maki Ikeda	CDP	40.3	LDP hold
Hokkaido 6th	Takahiro Sasaki	CDP	Kuniyoshi Azuma	LDP	128,670	55.5	35,267	Masahito Nishikawa	CDP	40.3	LDP gain from CDP
Hokkaido 7th	Yoshitaka Itō	LDP	Yoshitaka Itō	LDP	80,797	58.0	35,234	Naoko Shinoda	CDP	32.7	LDP hold
Hokkaido 8th	Seiji Osaka	CDP	Seiji Osaka	CDP	112,857	52.7	11,478	Kazuo Maeda	LDP	47.3	CDP hold
Hokkaido 9th	Manabu Horii	LDP	Tatsumaru Yamaoka	CDP	113,512	51.5	6,670	Manabu Horii	LDP	48.5	CDP gain from LDP
Hokkaido 10th	Hisashi Inatsu	Komei	Hisashi Inatsu	Komei	96,843	53.9	14,125	Hiroshi Kamiya	CDP	46.1	Komei hold
Hokkaido 11th	Kaori Ishikawa	CDP	Kaori Ishikawa	CDP	91,538	51.8	6,202	Yūko Nakagawa	LDP	48.2	CDP hold
Hokkaido 12th	Arata Takebe	LDP	Arata Takebe	LDP	97,634	58.4	42,313	Eisei Kawaharada	CDP	33.1	LDP hold

Proportional representation results
Party	Votes	Seats	Rank	Elected member	Constituency	Ratio
LDP	863,300 (33.6%)	4	1	Takako Suzuki		
LDP	863,300 (33.6%)	4	2	Kōichi Watanabe		
LDP	863,300 (33.6%)	4	3	Manabu Horii	Hokkaido 9th	94.1%
LDP	863,300 (33.6%)	4	3	Yūko Nakagawa	Hokkaido 11th	93.2%
CDP	682,912 (26.6%)	3	1	Kureha Otsuki	Hokkaido 4th	99.3%
CDP	682,912 (26.6%)	3	1	Yutaka Arai	Hokkaido 3rd	96.2%
CDP	682,912 (26.6%)	3	1	Hiroshi Kamiya	Hokkaido 10th	85.4%
Komei	294,371 (11.5%)	1	1	Hidemichi Satō		

== Tohoku block ==
2021 Japanese general election in Tohoku
- 31 October 2021

All 36 seats to the House of Representatives
	Majority party	Minority party	Third party
Party	LDP	CDP	Komeito
Last election	23 seats	7 seats	1 seat
Constituency	16	7	0
PR seats	6	4	1
Total	22	11	1
Seat change	▼1	▲4	0
	Fourth party	Fifth party
Party	JCP	Ishin
Last election	1 seat	0 seats
Constituency	0	0
PR seats	1	1
Total	1	1
Seat change	0	▲1

Single-member constituency results in Tohoku
Constituency	Previous member		Elected member		Votes	%	Margin	Runner-up	Party	%	Status
Aomori 1st	Jun Tsushima	LDP	Akinori Eto	LDP	91,011	52.4	26,141	Sekio Masuta	CDP	37.4	LDP hold
Aomori 2nd	Tadamori Ōshima	LDP	Junichi Kanda	LDP	126,137	61.5	60,229	Noriko Takahata	CDP	32.1	LDP hold
Aomori 3rd	Jiro Kimura	LDP	Jiro Kimura	LDP	118,230	65.0	54,434	Takashi Yamauchi	CDP	35.0	LDP hold
Iwate 1st	Takeshi Shina	CDO	Takeshi Shina	CDP	87,017	51.2	24,351	Hinako Takahashi	LDP	36.9	CDP hold
Iwate 2nd	Shun'ichi Suzuki	LDP	Shun'ichi Suzuki	LDP	149,168	68.0	82,479	Masahide Obayashi	CDP	30.4	LDP hold
Iwate 3rd	Ichirō Ozawa	CDP	Takashi Fujiwara	LDP	118,734	52.1	9,102	Ichirō Ozawa	CDP	47.9	LDP gain from CDP
Miyagi 1st	Tōru Doi	LDP	Tōru Doi	LDP	101,964	43.4	5,315	Akiko Okamoto	CDP	41.2	LDP hold
Miyagi 2nd	Kenya Akiba	LDP	Sayuri Kamata	CDP	116,320	49.0	571	Kenya Akiba	LDP	48.7	CDP gain from LDP
Miyagi 3rd	Akihiro Nishimura	LDP	Akihiro Nishimura	LDP	96,210	59.3	35,973	Sonoko Ohno	CDP	37.1	LDP hold
Miyagi 4th	Shintaro Ito	LDP	Shintaro Ito	LDP	74,721	56.5	44,674	Yumi Funayama	JCP	22.7	LDP hold
Miyagi 5th	Jun Azumi	CDP	Jun Azumi	CDP	81,033	56.9	19,623	Chisato Morishita	LDP	43.1	CDP hold
Miyagi 6th	Itsunori Onodera	LDP	Itsunori Onodera	LDP	119,555	83.2	95,483	Takaji Naito	JCP	16.8	LDP hold
Akita 1st	Hiroyuki Togashi	LDP	Hiroyuki Togashi	LDP	77,960	51.9	5,594	Manabu Terata	CDP	48.1	LDP hold
Akita 2nd	Katsutoshi Kaneda	LDP	Takashi Midorikawa	CDP	81,845	52.5	7,900	Katsutoshi Kaneda	LDP	47.5	CDP gain from LDP
Akita 3rd	Nobuhide Minorikawa	LDP	Nobuhide Minorikawa	LDP	134,734	77.9	96,616	Akira Sugiyama	JCP	22.1	LDP hold
Yamagata 1st	Toshiaki Endo	LDP	Toshiaki Endo	LDP	110,688	60.0	36,816	Masahiro Harada	CDP	40.0	LDP hold
Yamagata 2nd	Norikazu Suzuki	LDP	Norikazu Suzuki	LDP	125,992	61.8	48,250	Kenichi Kato	DPFP	38.2	LDP hold
Yamagata 3rd	Ayuko Kato	LDP	Ayuko Kato	LDP	108,558	58.1	42,238	Hitomi Abe	Ind.	35.5	LDP hold
Fukushima 1st	Emi Kaneko	CDP	Emi Kaneko	CDP	123,620	51.1	5,546	Yoshitami Kameoka	LDP	48.9	CDP hold
Fukushima 2nd	Takumi Nemoto	LDP	Takumi Nemoto	LDP	102,638	54.6	17,137	Yuki Baba	CDP	45.4	LDP hold
Fukushima 3rd	Kōichirō Genba	CDP	Kōichirō Genba	CDP	90,457	54.2	14,155	Kentarō Uesugi	LDP	45.8	CDP hold
Fukushima 4th	Ichirō Kanke	LDP	Shinji Oguma	CDP	76,683	51.0	2,899	Ichirō Kanke	LDP	49.0	CDP gain from LDP
Fukushima 5th	Masayoshi Yoshino	LDP	Masayoshi Yoshino	LDP	93,325	62.7	37,706	Tomo Kumagai	JCP	37.3	LDP hold

Proportional representation results
Party	Votes	Seats	Rank	Elected member	Constituency	Ratio
LDP	1,628,233 (39.5%)	6	1	Jun Tsushima		
LDP	1,628,233 (39.5%)	6	2	Kenya Akiba	Miyagi 2nd	99.5%
LDP	1,628,233 (39.5%)	6	2	Ichirō Kanke	Fukushima 4th	96.2%
LDP	1,628,233 (39.5%)	6	2	Yoshitami Kameoka	Fukushima 1st	95.5%
LDP	1,628,233 (39.5%)	6	2	Katsutoshi Kaneda	Akita 2nd	90.3%
LDP	1,628,233 (39.5%)	6	2	Kentarō Uesugi	Fukushima 3rd	84.3%
CDP	991,504 (24.1%)	4	1	Akiko Okamoto	Miyagi 1st	94.7%
CDP	991,504 (24.1%)	4	1	Manabu Terata	Akita 1st	92.8%
CDP	991,504 (24.1%)	4	1	Ichirō Ozawa	Iwate 3rd	92.1%
CDP	991,504 (24.1%)	4	1	Yuki Baba	Fukushima 2nd	83.3%
Komei	456,287 (11.1%)	1	1	Kenichi Shoji		
JCP	292,830 (7.1%)	1	1	Chizuko Takahashi		
Ishin	258,690 (6.3%)	1	1	Atsushi Hayasaka		

== Northern Kanto block ==
2021 Japanese general election in Northern Kanto
- 31 October 2021

All 51 seats to the House of Representatives
	Majority party	Minority party	Third party
Party	LDP	CDP	Komeito
Last election	34 seats	11 seats	2 seats
Constituency	26	4	0
PR seats	7	5	3
Total	33	9	3
Seat change	▼1	▼2	▲1
	Fourth party	Fifth party	Sixth party
Party	Ishin	DPP	JCP
Last election	0 seats	New	1 seat
Constituency	0	1	0
PR seats	2	1	1
Total	2	2	1
Seat change	▲2	▲2	0

Single-member constituency results in Northern Kanto
Constituency	Previous member		Elected member		Votes	%	Margin	Runner-up		%	Status
Ibaraki 1st	Yoshinori Tadokoro	LDP	Nobuyuki Fukushima	Ind.	105,072	52.1	8,281	Yoshinori Tadokoro	LDP	47.9	Ind. gain from LDP
Ibaraki 2nd	Fukushiro Nukaga	LDP	Fukushiro Nukaga	LDP	110,831	64.5	49,728	Yukihisa Fujita	CDP	35.5	LDP hold
Ibaraki 3rd	Yasuhiro Hanashi	LDP	Yasuhiro Hanashi	LDP	109,448	53.6	45,774	Hiroki Kajioka	CDP	31.2	LDP hold
Ibaraki 4th	Hiroshi Kajiyama	LDP	Hiroshi Kajiyama	LDP	98,254	70.5	73,092	Yuko Muto	Ishin	18.0	LDP hold
Ibaraki 5th	Akimasa Ishikawa	LDP	Satoshi Asano	DPFP	61,373	48.5	7,495	Akimasa Ishikawa	LDP	42.6	DPFP gain from LDP
Ibaraki 6th	Yuya Niwa	LDP	Ayano Kunimitsu	LDP	125,703	52.5	12,133	Yamato Aoyama	CDP	47.5	LDP hold
Ibaraki 7th	Kishirō Nakamura	CDP	Keiko Nagaoka	LDP	74,362	46.5	3,519	Kishirō Nakamura	CDP	44.3	LDP gain from CDP
Tochigi 1st	Hajime Funada	LDP	Hajime Funada	LDP	102,870	46.2	36,170	Noriyoshi Watanabe	CDP	29.9	LDP hold
Tochigi 2nd	Akio Fukuda	CDP	Akio Fukuda	CDP	73,593	53.4	9,340	Kiyoshi Igarashi	LDP	46.6	CDP hold
Tochigi 3rd	Kazuo Yana	LDP	Kazuo Yana	LDP	82,398	67.4	42,572	Hiroshi Iga	CDP	32.6	LDP hold
Tochigi 4th	Tsutomu Sato	LDP	Tsutomu Sato	LDP	111,863	51.1	4,820	Takao Fujioka	CDP	48.9	LDP hold
Tochigi 5th	Toshimitsu Motegi	LDP	Toshimitsu Motegi	LDP	108,380	77.4	76,667	Keiko Okamura	JCP	22.6	LDP hold
Gunma 1st	Asako Omi	LDP	Yasutaka Nakasone	LDP	110,244	56.3	67,715	Takeshi Miyazaki	Ishin	21.7	LDP hold
Gunma 2nd	Toshiro Ino	LDP	Toshiro Ino	LDP	88,799	54.0	38,474	Keinin Horikoshi	CDP	30.6	LDP hold
Gunma 3rd	Hiroyoshi Sasagawa	LDP	Hiroyoshi Sasagawa	LDP	86,021	54.6	18,332	Kaichi Hasegawa	CDP	43.0	LDP hold
Gunma 4th	Tatsuo Fukuda	LDP	Tatsuo Fukuda	LDP	105,359	65.0	48,677	Kuniyoshi Kadokura	CDP	35.0	LDP hold
Gunma 5th	Yūko Obuchi	LDP	Yūko Obuchi	LDP	125,702	76.6	87,274	Tatsuya Ito	JCP	23.4	LDP hold
Saitama 1st	Hideki Murai	LDP	Hideki Murai	LDP	120,856	47.6	24,166	Koichi Takemasa	CDP	38.1	LDP hold
Saitama 2nd	Yoshitaka Shindō	LDP	Yoshitaka Shindō	LDP	121,543	52.8	64,216	Hideaki Takahashi	Ishin	24.9	LDP hold
Saitama 3rd	Hitoshi Kikawada	LDP	Hitoshi Kikawada	LDP	125,500	53.6	24,537	Yuriko Yamakawa	CDP	43.1	LDP hold
Saitama 4th	Yasushi Hosaka	LDP	Yasushi Hosaka	LDP	107,135	52.3	59,272	Katsuhiko Asano	DPFP	23.3	LDP hold
Saitama 5th	Yukio Edano	CDP	Yukio Edano	CDP	113,615	51.4	6,083	Hideki Makihara	LDP	48.6	CDP hold
Saitama 6th	Atsushi Oshima	CDP	Atsushi Oshima	CDP	134,281	56.0	28,848	Kazuyuki Nakane	LDP	44.0	CDP hold
Saitama 7th	Saichi Kamiyama	LDP	Hideyuki Nakano	LDP	98,598	44.2	5,539	Yasuko Komiyama	CDP	41.7	LDP hold
Saitama 8th	Masahiko Shibayama	LDP	Masahiko Shibayama	LDP	104,650	51.6	6,548	Masatoshi Onozuka	Ind.	48.4	LDP hold
Saitama 9th	Taku Otsuka	LDP	Taku Otsuka	LDP	117,002	53.4	36,246	Shinji Sugimura	CDP	36.8	LDP hold
Saitama 10th	Taimei Yamaguchi	LDP	Susumu Yamaguchi	LDP	96,153	51.6	5,939	Yunosuke Sakamoto	CDP	48.4	LDP hold
Saitama 11th	Ryuji Koizumi	LDP	Ryuji Koizumi	LDP	111,810	61.9	62,716	Makoto Shimada	CDP	27.2	LDP hold
Saitama 12th	Atsushi Nonaka	LDP	Toshikazu Morita	CDP	102,627	51.0	4,134	Atsushi Nonaka	LDP	49.0	CDP gain from LDP
Saitama 13th	Shinako Tsuchiya	LDP	Shinako Tsuchiya	LDP	101,149	49.4	14,226	Sota Misumi	CDP	42.5	LDP hold
Saitama 14th	Hiromi Mitsubayashi	LDP	Hiromi Mitsubayashi	LDP	111,262	51.6	38,709	Yoshihiro Suzuki	DPFP	33.6	LDP hold
Saitama 15th	Ryosei Tanaka	LDP	Ryosei Tanaka	LDP	102,023	45.9	30,065	Rentaro Takagi	CDP	32.4	LDP hold

Proportional representation results
Party	Votes	Seats	Rank	Elected member	Constituency	Ratio
LDP	2,172,065 (35.2%)	7	1	Asako Omi		
LDP	2,172,065 (35.2%)	7	2	Atsushi Nonaka	Saitama 12th	95.9%
LDP	2,172,065 (35.2%)	7	2	Hideki Makihara	Saitama 5th	94.6%
LDP	2,172,065 (35.2%)	7	2	Yoshinori Tadokoro	Ibaraki 1st	92.1%
LDP	2,172,065 (35.2%)	7	2	Akimasa Ishikawa	Ibaraki 5th	87.7%
LDP	2,172,065 (35.2%)	7	2	Kiyoshi Igarashi	Tochigi 2nd	87.3%
LDP	2,172,065 (35.2%)	7	2	Kazuyuki Nakane	Saitama 6th	78.5%
CDP	1,391,148 (22.5%)	5	1	Takao Fujioka	Tochigi 4th	95.6%
CDP	1,391,148 (22.5%)	5	1	Kishirō Nakamura	Ibaraki 7th	95.2%
CDP	1,391,148 (22.5%)	5	1	Yasuko Komiyama	Saitama 7th	94.4%
CDP	1,391,148 (22.5%)	5	1	Yunosuke Sakamoto	Saitama 10th	93.8%
CDP	1,391,148 (22.5%)	5	1	Yamato Aoyama	Ibaraki 6th	90.3%
Komei	823,930 (13.3%)	3	1	Keiichi Ishii		
Komei	823,930 (13.3%)	3	2	Keiichi Koshimizu		
Komei	823,930 (13.3%)	3	3	Takahiro Fukushige		
Ishin	617,531 (10.0%)	2	1	Ryo Sawada	Saitama 15th	47.4%
Ishin	617,531 (10.0%)	2	1	Hideaki Takahashi	Saitama 2nd	47.1%
JCP	444,115 (7.2%)	1	1	Tetsuya Shiokawa		
DPFP	298,056 (4.8%)	1	1	Yoshihiro Suzuki	Saitama 14th	65.2%

== Southern Kanto block ==
2021 Japanese general election in Southern Kanto
- 31 October 2021

All 55 seats to the House of Representatives
	Majority party	Minority party	Third party
Party	LDP	CDP	Ishin
Last election	33 seats	13 seats	1 seat
Constituency	22	11	0
PR seats	9	5	3
Total	31	16	3
Seat change	▼2	▲3	▲2
	Fourth party	Fifth party	Sixth party
Party	Komeito	JCP	DPP
Last election	2 seats	2 seats	New
Constituency	0	0	0
PR seats	2	1	1
Total	2	1	1
Seat change	0	▼1	▲1
	Seventh party
Party	Reiwa
Last election	New
Constituency	0
PR seats	1
Total	1
Seat change	▲1

Single-member constituency results in Southern Kanto
Constituency	Previous member		Elected member		Votes	%	Margin	Runner-up		%	Status
Chiba 1st	Hiroaki Kadoyama	LDP	Kaname Tajima	CDP	128,556	56.3	28,661	Hiroaki Kadoyama	LDP	43.7	CDP gain from LDP
Chiba 2nd	Takayuki Kobayashi	LDP	Takayuki Kobayashi	LDP	153,017	62.0	83,434	Yu Kuroda	CDP	28.2	LDP hold
Chiba 3rd	Hirokazu Matsuno	LDP	Hirokazu Matsuno	LDP	106,500	61.9	40,873	Kazumasa Okajima	CDP	38.1	LDP hold
Chiba 4th	Yoshihiko Noda	CDP	Yoshihiko Noda	CDP	154,412	64.5	69,599	Tetsuya Kimura	LDP	35.5	CDP hold
Chiba 5th	Kentaro Sonoura	LDP	Kentaro Sonoura	LDP	111,985	47.0	42,098	Kentaro Yazaki	CDP	29.3	LDP hold
Chiba 6th	Hiromichi Watanabe	LDP	Hiromichi Watanabe	LDP	80,764	42.5	31,935	Kenta Fujimaki	Ishin	25.7	LDP hold
Chiba 7th	Ken Saitō	LDP	Ken Saitō	LDP	127,548	55.0	56,500	Chiharu Takeuchi	CDP	30.6	LDP hold
Chiba 8th	Yoshitaka Sakurada	LDP	Satoshi Honjō	CDP	135,125	59.7	53,569	Yoshitaka Sakurada	LDP	36.0	CDP gain from LDP
Chiba 9th	Masatoshi Akimoto	LDP	Soichiro Okuno	CDP	107,322	51.1	4,581	Masatoshi Akimoto	LDP	48.9	CDP gain from LDP
Chiba 10th	Motoo Hayashi	LDP	Motoo Hayashi	LDP	83,822	47.3	2,851	Hajime Yatagawa	CDP	45.7	LDP hold
Chiba 11th	Eisuke Mori	LDP	Eisuke Mori	LDP	110,538	64.4	79,981	Fumiaki Shiina	JCP	17.8	LDP hold
Chiba 12th	Yasukazu Hamada	LDP	Yasukazu Hamada	LDP	123,210	64.0	66,463	Takeshi Hidaka	CDP	29.5	LDP hold
Chiba 13th	Takaki Shirasuka	Ind.	Hisashi Matsumoto	LDP	100,227	45.1	20,540	Shin Miyakawa	CDP	35.8	LDP gain from Ind.
Kanagawa 1st	Jun Matsumoto	Ind.	Go Shinohara	CDP	100,118	45.0	24,054	Jun Matsumoto	Ind.	34.2	CDP gain from Ind.
Kanagawa 2nd	Yoshihide Suga	LDP	Yoshihide Suga	LDP	146,166	61.1	53,286	Eiko Okamoto	CDP	38.9	LDP hold
Kanagawa 3rd	Vacant	LDP	Kenji Nakanishi	LDP	119,199	52.5	50,742	Taketo Kobayashi	CDP	30.2	LDP hold
Kanagawa 4th	Yuki Waseda	CDP	Yuki Waseda	CDP	66,841	33.0	3,154	Keiichiro Asao	Ind.	31.5	CDP hold
Kanagawa 5th	Manabu Sakai	LDP	Manabu Sakai	LDP	136,288	53.5	17,669	Makoto Yamazaki	CDP	46.5	LDP hold
Kanagawa 6th	Yoichiro Aoyagi	CDP	Naoki Furukawa	LDP	92,405	44.3	4,525	Yoichiro Aoyagi	CDP	42.1	LDP gain from CDP
Kanagawa 7th	Keisuke Suzuki	LDP	Keisuke Suzuki	LDP	128,870	50.9	4,346	Kazuma Nakatani	CDP	49.1	LDP hold
Kanagawa 8th	Kenji Eda	CDP	Kenji Eda	CDP	130,925	52.6	12,962	Hidehiro Mitani	LDP	47.4	CDP hold
Kanagawa 9th	Hirofumi Ryu	CDP	Hirofumi Ryu	CDP	83,847	42.4	14,929	Norihiro Nakayama	LDP	34.9	CDP hold
Kanagawa 10th	Kazunori Tanaka	LDP	Kazunori Tanaka	LDP	104,832	41.4	35,238	Ryuna Kanemura	Ishin	27.5	LDP hold
Kanagawa 11th	Shinjirō Koizumi	LDP	Shinjirō Koizumi	LDP	147,634	79.2	108,791	Nobuaki Hayashi	JCP	20.8	LDP hold
Kanagawa 12th	Tomoko Abe	CDP	Tomoko Abe	CDP	95,013	42.4	3,854	Tsuyoshi Hoshino	LDP	40.7	CDP hold
Kanagawa 13th	Akira Amari	LDP	Hideshi Futori	CDP	130,124	51.1	5,529	Akira Amari	LDP	48.9	CDP gain from LDP
Kanagawa 14th	Jiro Akama	LDP	Jiro Akama	LDP	135,197	53.8	18,924	Yoshihiro Nagatomo	CDP	46.2	LDP hold
Kanagawa 15th	Taro Kono	LDP	Taro Kono	LDP	210,515	79.3	164,203	Katsumi Sasaki	SDP	17.5	LDP hold
Kanagawa 16th	Hiroyuki Yoshiie	LDP	Yuichi Goto	CDP	137,558	54.6	23,162	Hiroyuki Yoshiie	LDP	45.4	CDP gain from LDP
Kanagawa 17th	Karen Makishima	LDP	Karen Makishima	LDP	131,284	55.3	41,447	Yosuke Kamiyama	CDP	37.9	LDP hold
Kanagawa 18th	Daishiro Yamagiwa	LDP	Daishiro Yamagiwa	LDP	120,365	47.7	29,975	Kazuya Mimura	CDP	35.8	LDP hold
Yamanashi 1st	Katsuhito Nakajima	CDP	Shinichi Nakatani	LDP	125,325	50.5	7,102	Katsuhito Nakajima	CDP	47.6	LDP gain from CDP
Yamanashi 2nd	Noriko Horiuchi	LDP	Noriko Horiuchi	LDP	109,036	67.9	64,595	Tomoko Ichiki	CDP	27.7	LDP hold

Proportional representation results
Party	Votes	Seats	Rank	Elected member	Constituency	Ratio
LDP	2,590,787 (34.9%)	9	1	Tsuyoshi Hoshino	Kanagawa 12th	95.9%
LDP	2,590,787 (34.9%)	9	1	Akira Amari	Kanagawa 13th	95.7%
LDP	2,590,787 (34.9%)	9	1	Masatoshi Akimoto	Chiba 9th	95.7%
LDP	2,590,787 (34.9%)	9	1	Hidehiro Mitani	Kanagawa 8th	90.0%
LDP	2,590,787 (34.9%)	9	1	Hiroyuki Yoshiie	Kanagawa 16th	83.1%
LDP	2,590,787 (34.9%)	9	1	Norihiro Nakayama	Kanagawa 9th	82.1%
LDP	2,590,787 (34.9%)	9	1	Hiroaki Kadoyama	Chiba 1st	77.7%
LDP	2,590,787 (34.9%)	9	1	Tomohiro Yamamoto	Kanagawa 4th	71.0%
LDP	2,590,787 (34.9%)	9	1	Yoshitaka Sakurada	Chiba 8th	60.3%
CDP	1,651,562 (22.3%)	5	1	Kazuma Nakatani	Kanagawa 7th	96.6%
CDP	1,651,562 (22.3%)	5	1	Hajime Yatagawa	Chiba 10th	96.5%
CDP	1,651,562 (22.3%)	5	1	Yoichiro Aoyagi	Kanagawa 6th	95.1%
CDP	1,651,562 (22.3%)	5	1	Katsuhito Nakajima	Yamanashi 1st	94.3%
CDP	1,651,562 (22.3%)	5	1	Makoto Yamazaki	Kanagawa 5th	87.0%
Ishin	863,897 (11.7%)	3	1	Ryuna Kanemura	Kanagawa 10th	66.3%
Ishin	863,897 (11.7%)	3	1	Kenta Fujimaki	Chiba 6th	60.4%
Ishin	863,897 (11.7%)	3	1	Yoshiharu Asakawa	Kanagawa 1st	46.2%
Komei	850,667 (11.5%)	2	1	Noriko Furuya		
Komei	850,667 (11.5%)	2	2	Hideo Tsunoda		
JCP	534,493 (7.2%)	1	1	Kazuo Shii		
DPFP	384,481 (5.2%)	1	1	Atsushi Suzuki	Kanagawa 10th	28.6%
Reiwa	302,675 (4.1%)	1	1	Ryo Tagaya	Chiba 11th	27.5%

== Tokyo block ==
2021 Japanese general election in Tokyo
- 31 October 2021

All 42 seats to the House of Representatives
	Majority party	Minority party	Third party
Party	LDP	CDP	Komeito
Last election	25 seats	12 seats	3 seats
Constituency	15	8	1
PR seats	6	4	2
Total	21	12	3
Seat change	▼4	0	0
	Fourth party	Fifth party	Sixth party
Party	Ishin	JCP	Reiwa
Last election	0 seats	2 seats	New
Constituency	0	0	0
PR seats	2	2	1
Total	2	2	1
Seat change	▲2	0	▲1

Single-member constituency results in Tokyo
Constituency	Previous member		Elected member		Votes	%	Margin	Runner-up		%	Status
Tokyo 1st	Banri Kaieda	CDP	Miki Yamada	LDP	99,133	39.0	9,090	Banri Kaieda	CDP	35.4	LDP gain from CDP
Tokyo 2nd	Kiyoto Tsuji	LDP	Kiyoto Tsuji	LDP	119,281	43.4	28,859	Akihiro Matsuo	CDP	32.9	LDP hold
Tokyo 3rd	Hirotaka Ishihara	LDP	Jin Matsubara	CDP	124,961	45.9	8,208	Hirotaka Ishihara	LDP	42.9	CDP gain from LDP
Tokyo 4th	Masaaki Taira	LDP	Masaaki Taira	LDP	128,708	51.5	66,422	Tomoyuki Tanigawa	JCP	24.9	LDP hold
Tokyo 5th	Kenji Wakamiya	LDP	Yoshio Tezuka	CDP	111,246	41.0	5,404	Kenji Wakamiya	LDP	39.0	CDP gain from LDP
Tokyo 6th	Takayuki Ochiai	CDP	Takayuki Ochiai	CDP	110,169	40.1	4,983	Takao Ochi	LDP	38.3	CDP hold
Tokyo 7th	Akira Nagatsuma	CDP	Akira Nagatsuma	CDP	124,541	49.2	43,454	Fumiaki Matsumoto	LDP	32.1	CDP hold
Tokyo 8th	Nobuteru Ishihara	LDP	Harumi Yoshida	CDP	137,341	48.4	31,960	Nobuteru Ishihara	LDP	37.2	CDP gain from LDP
Tokyo 9th	Vacant	Ind.	Issei Yamagishi	CDP	109,489	40.9	14,205	Takao Ando	LDP	35.6	CDP gain from Ind.
Tokyo 10th	Hayato Suzuki	LDP	Hayato Suzuki	LDP	115,122	43.8	7,202	Yosuke Suzuki	CDP	41.1	LDP hold
Tokyo 11th	Hakubun Shimomura	LDP	Hakubun Shimomura	LDP	122,465	50.0	34,830	Yukihiko Akutsu	CDP	35.8	LDP hold
Tokyo 12th	Akihiro Ota	Komei	Mitsunari Okamoto	Komei	101,020	39.9	20,697	Tsukasa Abe	Ishin	31.7	Komei hold
Tokyo 13th	Ichirō Kamoshita	LDP	Shin Tsuchida	LDP	115,669	49.3	37,004	Tomohiko Kitajo	CDP	33.5	LDP hold
Tokyo 14th	Midori Matsushima	LDP	Midori Matsushima	LDP	108,681	43.3	27,749	Taketsuka Kimura	CDP	32.2	LDP hold
Tokyo 15th	Tsukasa Akimoto	Ind.	Mito Kakizawa	Ind.	76,261	32.0	17,283	Masae Ido	CDP	24.7	Ind. gain from Ind.
Tokyo 16th	Hideo Ōnishi	LDP	Hideo Ōnishi	LDP	88,758	38.7	20,361	Motoko Mizuno	CDP	29.8	LDP hold
Tokyo 17th	Katsuei Hirasawa	LDP	Katsuei Hirasawa	LDP	119,384	50.1	67,124	Sachiko Inokuchi	Ishin	22.0	LDP hold
Tokyo 18th	Naoto Kan	CDP	Naoto Kan	CDP	122,091	47.1	6,210	Akihisa Nagashima	LDP	44.7	CDP hold
Tokyo 19th	Yohei Matsumoto	LDP	Yoshinori Suematsu	CDP	111,267	43.0	2,136	Yohei Matsumoto	LDP	42.2	CDP gain from LDP
Tokyo 20th	Seiji Kihara	LDP	Seiji Kihara	LDP	121,621	52.6	55,105	Toru Miyamoto	JCP	28.8	LDP hold
Tokyo 21st	Akihisa Nagashima	CDP	Kiyoshi Odawara	LDP	112,433	45.5	13,343	Masako Ōkawara	CDP	40.1	LDP hold
Tokyo 22nd	Tatsuya Ito	LDP	Tatsuya Ito	LDP	131,351	46.9	18,958	Ikuo Yamahana	CDP	40.1	LDP hold
Tokyo 23rd	Masanobu Ogura	LDP	Masanobu Ogura	LDP	133,206	51.2	6,474	Shunsuke Ito	CDP	48.8	LDP hold
Tokyo 24th	Kōichi Hagiuda	LDP	Kōichi Hagiuda	LDP	149,152	58.5	104,606	Yumi Sato	DPFP	17.5	LDP hold
Tokyo 25th	Shinji Inoue	LDP	Shinji Inoue	LDP	131,430	59.4	41,439	Yukinari Shimada	CDP	40.6	LDP hold

Proportional representation results
Party	Votes	Seats	Rank	Elected member	Constituency	Ratio
LDP	2,000,084 (31.0%)	6	1	Kei Takagi		
LDP	2,000,084 (31.0%)	6	2	Yohei Matsumoto	Tokyo 19th	98.0%
LDP	2,000,084 (31.0%)	6	2	Takao Ochi	Tokyo 6th	95.4%
LDP	2,000,084 (31.0%)	6	2	Kenji Wakamiya	Tokyo 5th	95.1%
LDP	2,000,084 (31.0%)	6	2	Akihisa Nagashima	Tokyo 18th	94.9%
LDP	2,000,084 (31.0%)	6	2	Hirotaka Ishihara	Tokyo 3rd	93.4%
CDP	1,293,281 (20.1%)	4	1	Shunsuke Ito	Tokyo 23rd	95.1%
CDP	1,293,281 (20.1%)	4	1	Yosuke Suzuki	Tokyo 10th	93.7%
CDP	1,293,281 (20.1%)	4	1	Banri Kaieda	Tokyo 1st	90.8%
CDP	1,293,281 (20.1%)	4	1	Masako Ōkawara	Tokyo 21st	88.1%
Ishin	858,577 (13.3%)	2	1	Tsukasa Abe	Tokyo 12th	79.5%
Ishin	858,577 (13.3%)	2	1	Taisuke Ono	Tokyo 1st	60.7%
Komei	715,450 (11.1%)	2	1	Yōsuke Takagi		
Komei	715,450 (11.1%)	2	2	Koichi Kasai		
JCP	670,340 (10.4%)	2	1	Akira Kasai		
JCP	670,340 (10.4%)	2	2	Toru Miyamoto	Tokyo 20th	54.6%
Reiwa	360,387 (5.6%)	1	1	Taro Yamamoto		

== Hokuriku-Shin'etsu block ==
2021 Japanese general election in Hokuriku-Shin'etsu
- 31 October 2021

All 30 seats to the House of Representatives
	Majority party	Minority party	Third party
Party	LDP	CDP	Ishin
Last election	17 seats	7 seats	0 seats
Constituency	14	4	0
PR seats	6	3	1
Total	20	7	1
Seat change	▲3	0	▲1
	Fourth party	Fifth party
Party	Komeito	JCP
Last election	1 seat	1 seat
Constituency	0	0
PR seats	1	0
Total	1	0
Seat change	0	▼1

Single-member constituency results in Hokuriku-Shin'etsu
Constituency	Previous member		Elected member		Votes	%	Margin	Runner-up		%	Status
Niigata 1st	Chinami Nishimura	CDP	Chinami Nishimura	CDP	127,365	52.6	30,774	Ichiro Tsukada	LDP	39.9	CDP hold
Niigata 2nd	Eiichiro Washio	LDP	Kenichi Hosoda	LDP	105,426	59.9	68,269	Sakae Takakura	DPFP	21.1	LDP hold
Niigata 3rd	Takahiro Kuroiwa	CDP	Hiroaki Saito	LDP	102,564	53.6	13,820	Takahiro Kuroiwa	CDP	46.4	LDP gain from CDP
Niigata 4th	Makiko Kikuta	CDP	Makiko Kikuta	CDP	97,494	50.1	238	Isato Kunisada	LDP	49.9	CDP hold
Niigata 5th	Hirohiko Izumida	LDP	Ryuichi Yoneyama	Ind.	79,447	45.0	18,610	Hirohiko Izumida	LDP	34.4	Ind. gain from LDP
Niigata 6th	Shuichi Takatori	LDP	Mamoru Umetani	CDP	90,679	49.6	130	Shuichi Takatori	LDP	49.5	CDP gain from LDP
Toyama 1st	Hiroaki Tabata	LDP	Hiroaki Tabata	LDP	71,696	51.8	26,285	Toyofumi Yoshida	Ishin	32.8	LDP hold
Toyama 2nd	Mitsuhiro Miyakoshi	LDP	Eishun Ueda	LDP	89,341	68.4	48,089	Yasuharu Koshikawa	CDP	31.6	LDP hold
Toyama 3rd	Keiichiro Tachibana	LDP	Keiichiro Tachibana	LDP	161,818	78.5	117,604	Hiroshi Sakamoto	JCP	21.5	LDP hold
Ishikawa 1st	Hiroshi Hase	LDP	Takuo Komori	LDP	88,321	46.1	39,830	Atsushi Arai	CDP	25.3	LDP hold
Ishikawa 2nd	Hajime Sasaki	LDP	Hajime Sasaki	LDP	137,032	78.4	109,983	Hiroshi Sakamoto	JCP	15.5	LDP hold
Ishikawa 3rd	Shoji Nishida	LDP	Shoji Nishida	LDP	80,692	50.7	3,945	Kazuya Kondo	CDP	48.3	LDP hold
Fukui 1st	Tomomi Inada	LDP	Tomomi Inada	LDP	136,171	65.5	64,326	Tomihisa Noda	CDP	34.5	LDP hold
Fukui 2nd	Tsuyoshi Takagi	LDP	Tsuyoshi Takagi	LDP	81,705	53.9	11,721	Takeshi Saiki	CDP	46.1	LDP hold
Nagano 1st	Takashi Shinohara	CDP	Kenta Wakabayashi	LDP	128,423	51.3	6,461	Takashi Shinohara	CDP	48.7	LDP gain from CDP
Nagano 2nd	Mitsu Shimojo	CDP	Mitsu Shimojo	CDP	101,391	47.5	32,433	Shunsuke Mutai	LDP	32.3	CDP hold
Nagano 3rd	Yosei Ide	LDP	Yosei Ide	LDP	120,023	51.5	10,844	Takeshi Kozu	CDP	46.9	LDP hold
Nagano 4th	Shigeyuki Goto	LDP	Shigeyuki Goto	LDP	86,962	62.6	35,040	Yukiko Nagase	JCP	37.4	LDP hold
Nagano 5th	Ichiro Miyashita	LDP	Ichiro Miyashita	LDP	97,730	54.9	17,322	Itsuro Soga	CDP	45.1	LDP hold

Proportional representation results
Party	Votes	Seats	Rank	Elected member	Constituency	Ratio
LDP	1,468,380 (41.8%)	6	1	Eiichiro Washio		
LDP	1,468,380 (41.8%)	6	2	Shuichi Takatori	Niigata 6th	99.8%
LDP	1,468,380 (41.8%)	6	2	Isato Kunisada	Niigata 4th	99.7%
LDP	1,468,380 (41.8%)	6	2	Hirohiko Izumida	Niigata 5th	76.5%
LDP	1,468,380 (41.8%)	6	2	Ichiro Tsukada	Niigata 1st	75.8%
LDP	1,468,380 (41.8%)	6	2	Shunsuke Mutai	Nagano 2nd	68.0%
CDP	773,076 (22.0%)	3	1	Kazuya Kondo	Ishikawa 3rd	95.1%
CDP	773,076 (22.0%)	3	1	Takashi Shinohara	Nagano 1st	94.9%
CDP	773,076 (22.0%)	3	1	Takeshi Kozu	Nagano 3rd	90.9%
Ishin	361,476 (10.3%)	1	1	Toyofumi Yoshida	Toyama 1st	63.3%
Komei	322,535 (9.2%)	1	1	Hiromasa Nakagawa		

== Tokai block ==
2021 Japanese general election in Tokai
- 31 October 2021

All 53 seats to the House of Representatives
	Majority party	Minority party	Third party
Party	LDP	CDP	Komeito
Last election	29 seats	16 seats	2 seats
Constituency	24	6	0
PR seats	9	5	3
Total	33	11	3
Seat change	▲4	▼5	▲1
	Fourth party	Fifth party	Sixth party
Party	Ishin	DPP	JCP
Last election	1 seat	New	1 seat
Constituency	0	1	0
PR seats	2	1	1
Total	2	2	1
Seat change	▲1	▲2	0

Single-member constituency results in Tokai
Constituency	Previous member		Elected member		Votes	%	Margin	Runner-up		%	Status
Gifu 1st	Seiko Noda	LDP	Seiko Noda	LDP	103,805	62.5	55,176	Keisuke Kawamoto	CDP	29.3	LDP hold
Gifu 2nd	Yasufumi Tanahashi	LDP	Yasufumi Tanahashi	LDP	108,755	65.8	68,576	Yuriko Otani	DPFP	24.3	LDP hold
Gifu 3rd	Yoji Muto	LDP	Yoji Muto	LDP	132,357	58.6	38,741	Naoto Sakaguchi	CDP	41.4	LDP hold
Gifu 4th	Shunpei Kaneko	LDP	Shunpei Kaneko	LDP	110,844	51.2	19,490	Masato Imai	CDP	42.2	LDP hold
Gifu 5th	Keiji Furuya	LDP	Keiji Furuya	LDP	82,140	48.5	13,525	Ruru Imai	CDP	40.5	LDP hold
Shizuoka 1st	Yōko Kamikawa	LDP	Yōko Kamikawa	LDP	101,868	52.4	47,894	Yukihiro Endo	CDP	27.7	LDP hold
Shizuoka 2nd	Tatsunori Ibayashi	LDP	Tatsunori Ibayashi	LDP	131,082	61.1	60,050	Takashi Fukumura	CDP	33.1	LDP hold
Shizuoka 3rd	Hiroyuki Miyazawa	LDP	Nobuhiro Koyama	CDP	112,464	52.7	11,689	Hiroyuki Miyazawa	LDP	47.3	CDP gain from LDP
Shizuoka 4th	Yoichi Fukazawa	LDP	Yoichi Fukazawa	LDP	84,154	53.3	34,849	Ken Tanaka	DPFP	31.2	LDP hold
Shizuoka 5th	Goshi Hosono	Ind.	Goshi Hosono	Ind.	127,580	51.8	66,243	Takeru Yoshikawa	LDP	24.9	Ind. hold
Shizuoka 6th	Shu Watanabe	CDP	Takaaki Katsumata	LDP	104,178	46.1	4,420	Shu Watanabe	CDP	44.1	LDP gain from CDP
Shizuoka 7th	Minoru Kiuchi	LDP	Minoru Kiuchi	LDP	130,024	68.2	69,298	Yuta Hiyoshi	CDP	31.8	LDP hold
Shizuoka 8th	Ryū Shionoya	LDP	Kentaro Genma	CDP	114,210	55.8	23,802	Ryū Shionoya	LDP	44.2	CDP gain from LDP
Aichi 1st	Hiromichi Kumada	LDP	Hiromichi Kumada	LDP	94,107	48.8	2,400	Tsunehiko Yoshida	CDP	47.6	LDP hold
Aichi 2nd	Motohisa Furukawa	DPFP	Motohisa Furukawa	DPFP	131,397	62.3	51,979	Takamoto Nakagawa	LDP	47.7	DPFP hold
Aichi 3rd	Shoichi Kondo	CDP	Shoichi Kondo	CDP	121,400	55.0	21,911	Yoshitaka Ikeda	LDP	45.0	CDP hold
Aichi 4th	Shōzō Kudō	LDP	Shōzō Kudō	LDP	78,004	43.7	5,218	Yoshio Maki	CDP	40.8	LDP hold
Aichi 5th	Hirotaka Akamatsu	CDP	Kenji Kanda	LDP	84,320	41.2	9,325	Atsushi Nishikawa	CDP	36.6	LDP gain from CDP
Aichi 6th	Hideki Niwa	LDP	Hideki Niwa	LDP	136,168	58.3	59,256	Isao Matsuda	CDP	33.0	LDP hold
Aichi 7th	Shiori Yamao	DPFP	Junji Suzuki	LDP	144,725	54.7	55,811	Kazuyoshi Morimoto	CDP	33.6	LDP gain from DPFP
Aichi 8th	Tadahiko Ito	LDP	Tadahiko Ito	LDP	121,714	50.2	1,065	Yutaka Banno	CDP	49.8	LDP hold
Aichi 9th	Yasumasa Nagasaka	LDP	Yasumasa Nagasaka	LDP	120,213	52.7	12,491	Mitsunori Okamoto	CDP	47.3	LDP hold
Aichi 10th	Tetsuma Esaki	LDP	Tetsuma Esaki	LDP	81,107	35.0	18,506	Kazumi Sugimoto	Ishin	27.0	LDP hold
Aichi 11th	Shinichiro Furumoto	Ind.	Tetsuya Yagi	LDP	158,018	69.1	121,230	Nobuhiro Honda	JCP	16.1	LDP gain from Ind.
Aichi 12th	Kazuhiko Shigetoku	CDP	Kazuhiko Shigetoku	CDP	142,536	52.7	14,453	Shuhei Aoyama	LDP	47.3	CDP hold
Aichi 13th	Kensuke Onishi	CDP	Kensuke Onishi	CDP	134,033	52.7	13,830	Taku Ishii	LDP	47.3	CDP hold
Aichi 14th	Soichiro Imaeda	LDP	Soichiro Imaeda	LDP	114,160	63.0	54,698	Katsunori Tanaka	CDP	32.8	LDP hold
Aichi 15th	Yukinori Nemoto	LDP	Yukinori Nemoto	LDP	104,204	52.4	23,428	Kenichiro Seki	CDP	40.6	LDP hold
Mie 1st	Norihisa Tamura	LDP	Norihisa Tamura	LDP	122,772	63.1	58,265	Naohisa Matsuda	CDP	33.1	LDP hold
Mie 2nd	Masaharu Nakagawa	CDP	Hideto Kawasaki	LDP	110,155	50.2	990	Masaharu Nakagawa	CDP	49.8	LDP gain from CDP
Mie 3rd	Katsuya Okada	CDP	Katsuya Okada	CDP	144,688	64.1	63,479	Masataka Ishihara	LDP	35.9	CDP hold
Mie 4th	Norio Mitsuya	LDP	Eikei Suzuki	LDP	128,753	72.4	87,442	Shuji Bono	CDP	23.2	LDP hold

Proportional representation results
Party	Votes	Seats	Rank	Elected member	Constituency	Ratio
LDP	2,515,841 (37.4%)	9	1	Shuhei Aoyama	Aichi 12th	89.8%
LDP	2,515,841 (37.4%)	9	1	Taku Ishii	Aichi 13th	89.6%
LDP	2,515,841 (37.4%)	9	1	Hiroyuki Miyazawa	Shizuoka 3rd	89.6%
LDP	2,515,841 (37.4%)	9	1	Yoshitaka Ikeda	Aichi 3rd	81.9%
LDP	2,515,841 (37.4%)	9	1	Ryū Shionoya	Shizuoka 8th	79.1%
LDP	2,515,841 (37.4%)	9	1	Takamoto Nakagawa	Aichi 2nd	60.4%
LDP	2,515,841 (37.4%)	9	1	Masataka Ishihara	Mie 3rd	56.1%
LDP	2,515,841 (37.4%)	9	1	Takeru Yoshikawa	Shizuoka 5th	48.0%
LDP	2,515,841 (37.4%)	9	31	Sakon Yamamoto		
CDP	1,485,947 (22.1%)	5	1	Yutaka Banno	Aichi 8th	99.1%
CDP	1,485,947 (22.1%)	5	1	Masaharu Nakagawa	Mie 2nd	99.1%
CDP	1,485,947 (22.1%)	5	1	Tsunehiko Yoshida	Aichi 1st	97.4%
CDP	1,485,947 (22.1%)	5	1	Shu Watanabe	Shizuoka 6th	95.7%
CDP	1,485,947 (22.1%)	5	1	Yoshio Maki	Aichi 4th	93.3%
Komei	784,976 (11.7%)	3	1	Yoshinori Oguchi		
Komei	784,976 (11.7%)	3	2	Wataru Ito		
Komei	784,976 (11.7%)	3	3	Yasuhiro Nakagawa		
Ishin	694,630 (10.3%)	2	1	Kazumi Sugimoto	Aichi 10th	77.1%
Ishin	694,630 (10.3%)	2	1	Maki Misaki	Aichi 5th	54.0%
JCP	408,606 (6.1%)	1	1	Nobuko Motomura		
DPFP	382,732 (5.7%)	1	1	Ken Tanaka	Shizuoka 4th	58.5%

== Kinki block ==
2021 Japanese general election in Kinki
- 31 October 2021

All 75 seats to the House of Representatives
	Majority party	Minority party	Third party
Party	Ishin	LDP	Komeito
Last election	8 seats	42 seats	10 seats
Constituency	16	17	6
PR seats	10	8	3
Total	26	25	9
Seat change	▲18	▼17	▼1
	Fourth party	Fifth party	Sixth party
Party	CDP	DPP	JCP
Last election	11 seats	New	2 seats
Constituency	4	2	0
PR seats	3	1	2
Total	7	3	2
Seat change	▼4	▲3	0
	Seventh party
Party	Reiwa
Last election	New
Constituency	0
PR seats	1
Total	1
Seat change	▲1

Single-member constituency results in Kinki
Constituency	Previous member		Elected member		Votes	%	Margin	Runner-up		%	Status
Shiga 1st	Toshitaka Ōoka	LDP	Toshitaka Ōoka	LDP	97,482	52.2	13,376	Alex Saito	DPFP	45.1	LDP hold
Shiga 2nd	Kenichiro Ueno	LDP	Kenichiro Ueno	LDP	83,502	56.6	19,383	Issei Tajima	CDP	43.4	LDP hold
Shiga 3rd	Nobuhide Takemura	LDP	Nobuhide Takemura	LDP	81,888	52.8	40,295	Hitoshi Naoyama	Ishin	26.8	LDP hold
Shiga 4th	Hiroo Kotera	LDP	Hiroo Kotera	LDP	86,762	54.6	14,646	Hisashi Tokunaga	CDP	45.4	LDP hold
Kyoto 1st	Bunmei Ibuki	LDP	Yasushi Katsume	LDP	86,238	40.4	21,037	Keiji Kokuta	JCP	30.5	LDP hold
Kyoto 2nd	Seiji Maehara	DPFP	Seiji Maehara	DPFP	72,516	48.9	29,225	Mamoru Shigemoto	LDP	29.2	DPFP hold
Kyoto 3rd	Kenta Izumi	CDP	Kenta Izumi	CDP	89,259	48.2	27,585	Yayoi Kimura	LDP	33.3	CDP hold
Kyoto 4th	Hideyuki Tanaka	LDP	Keiro Kitagami	Ind.	96,172	44.2	15,397	Hideyuki Tanaka	LDP	37.1	Ind. gain from LDP
Kyoto 5th	Taro Honda	LDP	Taro Honda	LDP	68,693	49.4	36,585	Wakako Yamamoto	CDP	23.1	LDP hold
Kyoto 6th	Hiroshi Ando	LDP	Kazunori Yamanoi	CDP	116,111	45.2	34,107	Koichiro Shimizu	LDP	32.0	CDP gain from LDP
Osaka 1st	Hiroyuki Onishi	LDP	Inoue Hidetaka	Ishin	110,120	49.4	42,975	Hiroyuki Onishi	LDP	30.1	Ishin gain from LDP
Osaka 2nd	ja	LDP	Tadashi Morishima	Ishin	120,913	48.5	39,976	Akira Sato	LDP	32.5	Ishin gain from LDP
Osaka 3rd	Shigeki Sato	Komei	Shigeki Sato	Komei	79,507	44.7	37,770	Hitoshi Hagihara	CDP	23.4	Komei hold
Osaka 4th	Yasuhide Nakayama	LDP	Teruo Minobe	Ishin	107,585	46.1	34,750	Yasuhide Nakayama	LDP	31.2	Ishin gain from LDP
Osaka 5th	Tōru Kunishige	Komei	Tōru Kunishige	Komei	106,508	53.1	58,260	Takeshi Miyamoto	JCP	24.1	Komei hold
Osaka 6th	Shinichi Isa	Komei	Shinichi Isa	Komei	106,878	54.8	47,687	Fumiyoshi Murakami	CDP	30.4	Komei hold
Osaka 7th	Naomi Tokashiki	LDP	Takemitsu Okushita	Ishin	102,486	45.3	30,894	Naomi Tokashiki	LDP	31.7	Ishin gain from LDP
Osaka 8th	Takashi Ōtsuka	Ind.	Joji Uruma	Ishin	105,073	53.2	51,196	Keiichiro Korai	LDP	27.3	Ishin gain from Ind.
Osaka 9th	Kenji Harada	LDP	Yasushi Adachi	Ishin	133,146	50.3	49,370	Kenji Harada	LDP	31.7	Ishin gain from LDP
Osaka 10th	Kiyomi Tsujimoto	CDP	Taku Ikeshita	Ishin	80,932	40.3	13,989	Kiyomi Tsujimoto	CDP	33.4	Ishin gain from CDP
Osaka 11th	Hirofumi Hirano	CDP	Hiroshi Nakatsuka	Ishin	105,746	44.7	35,178	Yukari Sato	LDP	29.8	Ishin gain from CDP
Osaka 12th	Fumitake Fujita	Ishin	Fumitake Fujita	Ishin	94,003	51.2	34,699	Shinpei Kitakawa	LDP	32.3	Ishin hold
Osaka 13th	Koichi Munekiyo	LDP	Ryohei Iwatani	Ishin	101,857	48.5	16,536	Koichi Munekiyo	LDP	40.6	Ishin gain from LDP
Osaka 14th	Takashi Nagao	LDP	Hitoshi Aoyagi	Ishin	126,307	55.7	26,578	Takashi Nagao	LDP	30.9	Ishin gain from LDP
Osaka 15th	Naokazu Takemoto	LDP	Yasuto Urano	Ishin	114,861	54.1	46,974	Yonosuke Kano	LDP	32.0	Ishin gain from LDP
Osaka 16th	Kazuo Kitagawa	Komei	Kazuo Kitagawa	Komei	84,563	50.8	11,992	Hiroyuki Moriyama	CDP	43.6	Komei hold
Osaka 17th	Nobuyuki Baba	Ishin	Nobuyuki Baba	Ishin	94,398	53.6	38,337	Shohei Okashita	LDP	31.8	Ishin hold
Osaka 18th	Takashi Endo	Ishin	Takashi Endo	Ishin	118,421	53.0	56,824	Noboru Kamitani	LDP	27.5	Ishin hold
Osaka 19th	Hodaka Maruyama	NHK	Ito Nobuhisa	Ishin	68,209	42.2	16,157	Tomu Tanigawa	LDP	32.2	Ishin gain from NHK
Hyogo 1st	Masahito Moriyama	LDP	Nobuhiko Isaka	CDP	78,657	36.9	14,455	Masahito Moriyama	LDP	30.1	CDP gain from LDP
Hyogo 2nd	Kazuyoshi Akaba	Komei	Kazuyoshi Akaba	Komei	99,455	54.2	37,571	Jiro Funakawa	CDP	33.7	Komei hold
Hyogo 3rd	Yoshihiro Seki	LDP	Yoshihiro Seki	LDP	68,957	40.9	9,420	Yuichiro Wada	Ishin	35.4	LDP hold
Hyogo 4th	Hisayuki Fujii	LDP	Hisayuki Fujii	LDP	112,810	50.0	53,667	Masayuki Akagi	Ishin	26.2	LDP hold
Hyogo 5th	Koichi Tani	LDP	Koichi Tani	LDP	94,656	42.5	28,942	Ryota Endo	Ishin	29.5	LDP hold
Hyogo 6th	Masaki Ogushi	LDP	Koichiro Ichimura	Ishin	89,571	35.2	2,069	Masaki Ogushi	LDP	34.4	Ishin gain from LDP
Hyogo 7th	Kenji Yamada	LDP	Kenji Yamada	LDP	95,140	37.5	1,530	Kē Miki	Ishin	36.9	LDP hold
Hyogo 8th	Hiromasa Nakano	Komei	Hiromasa Nakano	Komei	100,313	58.8	54,910	Jun Komura	JCP	26.6	Komei hold
Hyogo 9th	Yasutoshi Nishimura	LDP	Yasutoshi Nishimura	LDP	141,973	76.3	97,801	Yukari Fukuhara	JCP	23.7	LDP hold
Hyogo 10th	Kisaburo Tokai	LDP	Kisaburo Tokai	LDP	79,061	45.0	21,187	Kenji Horii	Ishin	32.9	LDP hold
Hyogo 11th	Takeaki Matsumoto	LDP	Takeaki Matsumoto	LDP	92,761	49.0	14,679	Hiroki Sumiyoshi	Ishin	41.3	LDP hold
Hyogo 12th	Tsuyoshi Yamaguchi	LDP	Tsuyoshi Yamaguchi	LDP	91,099	55.6	41,363	Kotaro Ikehata	Ishin	30.3	LDP hold
Nara 1st	Shigeki Kobayashi	LDP	Sumio Mabuchi	CDP	93,050	39.0	9,332	Shigeki Kobayashi	LDP	35.1	CDP gain from LDP
Nara 2nd	Sanae Takaichi	LDP	Sanae Takaichi	LDP	141,858	64.6	87,532	Misato Ioku	CDP	24.8	LDP hold
Nara 3rd	Taido Tanose	Ind.	Taido Tanose	Ind.	114,553	60.8	80,219	Masakatsu Nishikawa	JCP	18.2	Ind. hold
Wakayama 1st	Shūhei Kishimoto	DPFP	Shūhei Kishimoto	DPFP	103,676	62.7	42,068	Hirofumi Kado	LDP	37.3	DPFP hold
Wakayama 2nd	Masatoshi Ishida	LDP	Masatoshi Ishida	LDP	79,365	57.7	43,711	Mikio Fujii	CDP	25.9	LDP hold
Wakayama 3rd	Toshihiro Nikai	LDP	Toshihiro Nikai	LDP	102,834	69.3	82,142	Yoshihiro Hatano	JCP	14.0	LDP hold

Proportional representation results
Party	Votes	Seats	Rank	Elected member	Constituency	Ratio
Ishin	3,180,219 (33.9%)	10	1	Kē Miki	Hyogo 7th	98.3%
Ishin	3,180,219 (33.9%)	10	1	Yuichiro Wada	Hyogo 3rd	86.3%
Ishin	3,180,219 (33.9%)	10	1	Hiroki Sumiyoshi	Hyogo 11th	84.1%
Ishin	3,180,219 (33.9%)	10	1	Kenji Horii	Hyogo 10th	73.2%
Ishin	3,180,219 (33.9%)	10	1	Sachiko Horiba	Kyoto 1st	71.9%
Ishin	3,180,219 (33.9%)	10	1	Ryota Endo	Hyogo 5th	69.4%
Ishin	3,180,219 (33.9%)	10	1	Yuichiro Ichitani	Hyogo 1st	67.6%
Ishin	3,180,219 (33.9%)	10	1	Kiyoshige Maekawa	Nara 1st	66.6%
Ishin	3,180,219 (33.9%)	10	1	Kotaro Ikehata	Hyogo 12th	54.5%
Ishin	3,180,219 (33.9%)	10	1	Masayuki Akagi	Hyogo 4th	52.4%
LDP	2,407,699 (25.7%)	8	1	Shinsuke Okuno		
LDP	2,407,699 (25.7%)	8	2	Akira Yanagimoto		
LDP	2,407,699 (25.7%)	8	3	Masaki Ogushi	Hyogo 6th	97.6%
LDP	2,407,699 (25.7%)	8	3	Shigeki Kobayashi	Nara 1st	89.9%
LDP	2,407,699 (25.7%)	8	3	Hideyuki Tanaka	Kyoto 4th	83.9%
LDP	2,407,699 (25.7%)	8	3	Koichi Munekiyo	Osaka 13th	83.7%
LDP	2,407,699 (25.7%)	8	3	Masahito Moriyama	Hyogo 1st	81.6%
LDP	2,407,699 (25.7%)	8	3	Tomu Tanigawa	Osaka 19th	76.3%
Komei	1,155,683 (12.3%)	3	1	Yuzuru Takeuchi		
Komei	1,155,683 (12.3%)	3	2	Tomoko Ukishima		
Komei	1,155,683 (12.3%)	3	3	Yoko Wanibuchi		
CDP	1,090,665 (11.6%)	3	1	Shu Sakurai	Hyogo 6th	86.3%
CDP	1,090,665 (11.6%)	3	1	Hiroyuki Moriyama	Osaka 16th	85.8%
CDP	1,090,665 (11.6%)	3	1	Hisashi Tokunaga	Shiga 4th	83.1%
JCP	736,156 (7.8%)	2	1	Keiji Kokuta	Kyoto 1st	75.6%
JCP	736,156 (7.8%)	2	2	Takeshi Miyamoto	Osaka 5th	45.2%
DPFP	303,480 (3.2%)	1	1	Alex Saito	Shiga 1st	86.2%
Reiwa	292,483 (3.1%)	1	1	Akiko Ōishi	Osaka 5th	32.1%

== Chugoku block ==
2021 Japanese general election in Chugoku
- 31 October 2021

All 31 seats to the House of Representatives
	Majority party	Minority party
Party	LDP	CDP
Last election	23 seats	5 seats
Constituency	17	1
PR seats	6	2
Total	23	3
Seat change	0	▼2
	Third party	Fourth party
Party	Komeito	Ishin
Last election	2 seats	0 seats
Constituency	1	0
PR seats	2	1
Total	3	1
Seat change	▲1	▲1

Single-member constituency results in Chugoku
Constituency	Previous member		Elected member		Votes	%	Margin	Runner-up		%	Status
Tottori 1st	Shigeru Ishiba	LDP	Shigeru Ishiba	LDP	105,441	84.1	85,456	Masakazu Okada	JCP	15.9	LDP hold
Tottori 2nd	Ryosei Akazawa	LDP	Ryosei Akazawa	LDP	75,005	54.0	11,058	Shinji Yuhara	CDP	46.0	LDP hold
Shimane 1st	Hiroyuki Hosoda	LDP	Hiroyuki Hosoda	LDP	90,638	56.0	23,791	Akiko Kamei	CDP	41.3	LDP hold
Shimane 2nd	Vacant	LDP	Yasuhiro Takami	LDP	110,327	62.4	58,311	Homaru Yamamoto	CDP	29.4	LDP hold
Okayama 1st	Ichiro Aisawa	LDP	Ichiro Aisawa	LDP	90,939	55.0	25,440	Kensuke Harada	CDP	39.6	LDP hold
Okayama 2nd	Takashi Yamashita	LDP	Takashi Yamashita	LDP	80,903	56.4	18,348	Keisuke Tsumura	CDP	43.6	LDP hold
Okayama 3rd	Toshiko Abe	LDP	Shojiro Hiranuma	Ind.	68,631	44.4	13,701	Toshiko Abe	LDP	35.5	Ind. gain from LDP
Okayama 4th	Gaku Hashimoto	LDP	Gaku Hashimoto	LDP	89,052	49.7	5,193	Michiyoshi Yunoki	CDP	46.8	LDP hold
Okayama 5th	Katsunobu Katō	LDP	Katsunobu Katō	LDP	102,139	72.6	70,672	Tomoko Hata	CDP	22.4	LDP hold
Hiroshima 1st	Fumio Kishida	LDP	Fumio Kishida	LDP	133,704	80.7	117,800	Yuko Arita	SDP	9.6	LDP hold
Hiroshima 2nd	Hiroshi Hiraguchi	LDP	Hiroshi Hiraguchi	LDP	133,126	65.2	62,187	Akai Oi	CDP	34.8	LDP hold
Hiroshima 3rd	Vacant	Ind.	Tetsuo Saito	Komei	97,844	55.1	44,701	Mayumi Raian	CDP	29.9	Komei gain from Ind.
Hiroshima 4th	Masayoshi Shintani	LDP	Masayoshi Shintani	LDP	78,253	48.3	44,572	Kanji Ueno	CDP	20.8	LDP hold
Hiroshima 5th	Minoru Terada	LDP	Minoru Terada	LDP	87,434	67.7	45,646	Kojiro Nomura	CDP	32.3	LDP hold
Hiroshima 6th	Koji Sato	CDP	Koji Sato	CDP	83,706	51.4	4,638	Toshifumi Kojima	LDP	48.6	CDP hold
Hiroshima 7th	Fumiaki Kobayashi	LDP	Fumiaki Kobayashi	LDP	123,396	66.4	77,876	Hironori Sato	CDP	24.5	LDP hold
Yamaguchi 1st	Masahiro Kōmura	LDP	Masahiro Kōmura	LDP	118,882	70.1	68,198	Kazuya Ouchi	CDP	29.9	LDP hold
Yamaguchi 2nd	Nobuo Kishi	LDP	Nobuo Kishi	LDP	109,914	76.9	76,978	Kazushi Matsuda	JCP	23.1	LDP hold
Yamaguchi 3rd	Takeo Kawamura	LDP	Yoshimasa Hayashi	LDP	96,983	76.9	67,910	Fumiko Sakamoto	CDP	23.1	LDP hold
Yamaguchi 4th	Shinzo Abe	LDP	Shinzo Abe	LDP	80,448	69.7	61,352	Katsushi Takemura	Reiwa	16.6	LDP hold

Proportional representation results
Party	Votes	Seats	Rank	Elected member	Constituency	Ratio
LDP	1,352,723 (43.4%)	6	1	Rintaro Ishibashi		
LDP	1,352,723 (43.4%)	6	2	Toshifumi Kojima	Hiroshima 6th	94.4%
LDP	1,352,723 (43.4%)	6	2	Toshiko Abe	Okayama 3rd	80.0%
LDP	1,352,723 (43.4%)	6	18	Emiko Takagai		
LDP	1,352,723 (43.4%)	6	19	Mio Sugita		
LDP	1,352,723 (43.4%)	6	20	Shogo Azemoto		
CDP	573,324 (18.4%)	2	1	Michiyoshi Yunoki	Okayama 4th	94.1%
CDP	573,324 (18.4%)	2	1	Shinji Yuhara	Tottori 2nd	85.2%
Komei	436,220 (14.0%)	2	1	Akira Hirabayashi		
Komei	436,220 (14.0%)	2	2	Masaki Kusaka		
Ishin	286,302 (9.2%)	1	1	Seiki Soramoto	Hiroshima 4th	37.0%

== Shikoku block ==
2021 Japanese general election in Shikoku
- 31 October 2021

All 17 seats to the House of Representatives
	Majority party	Minority party	Third party
Party	LDP	CDP	DPP
Last election	11 seats	4 seats	New
Constituency	8	1	1
PR seats	3	1	0
Total	11	2	1
Seat change	0	▼2	▲1
	Fourth party	Fifth party
Party	Komeito	Ishin
Last election	1 seat	0 seats
Constituency	0	0
PR seats	1	1
Total	1	1
Seat change	0	▲1

Single-member constituency results in Shikoku
Constituency	Previous member		Elected member		Votes	%	Margin	Runner-up		%	Status
Tokushima 1st	Masazumi Gotoda	LDP	Hirobumi Niki	Ind.	99,474	50.1	22,076	Masazumi Gotoda	LDP	38.9	Ind. gain from LDP
Tokushima 2nd	Shunichi Yamaguchi	LDP	Shunichi Yamaguchi	LDP	76,879	59.5	33,406	Mayumi Nakano	CDP	33.6	LDP hold
Kagawa 1st	Takuya Hirai	LDP	Junya Ogawa	CDP	90,267	51.0	19,440	Takuya Hirai	LDP	40.0	CDP gain from LDP
Kagawa 2nd	Yuichiro Tamaki	DPFP	Yuichiro Tamaki	DPFP	94,530	63.5	40,196	Takakazu Seto	LDP	36.5	DPFP hold
Kagawa 3rd	Keitaro Ohno	LDP	Keitaro Ohno	LDP	94,437	79.8	70,500	Junichiro Ozaki	JCP	20.2	LDP hold
Ehime 1st	Yasuhisa Shiozaki	LDP	Akihisa Shiozaki	LDP	119,633	60.8	42,542	Toshirō Tomochika	CDP	39.2	LDP hold
Ehime 2nd	Seiichiro Murakami	LDP	Seiichiro Murakami	LDP	72,861	57.5	30,341	Tomoe Ishii	DPFP	33.5	LDP hold
Ehime 3rd	Yoichi Shiraishi	CDP	Takumi Ihara	LDP	76,263	51.6	4,663	Yoichi Shiraishi	CDP	48.4	LDP gain from CDP
Ehime 4th	Koichi Yamamoto	LDP	Junji Hasegawa	LDP	81,015	56.6	33,298	Fumiki Sakurauchi	Ind.	33.3	LDP hold
Kochi 1st	Gen Nakatani	LDP	Gen Nakatani	LDP	104,837	64.3	54,804	Norio Takeuchi	CDP	30.7	LDP hold
Kochi 2nd	Hajime Hirota	CDP	Masanao Ozaki	LDP	117,810	67.2	62,596	Hajime Hirota	CDP	31.5	LDP gain from CDP

Proportional representation results
Party	Votes	Seats	Rank	Elected member	Constituency	Ratio
LDP	664,805 (39.1%)	3	1	Yūji Yamamoto		
LDP	664,805 (39.1%)	3	2	Takuya Hirai	Kagawa 1st	78.4%
LDP	664,805 (39.1%)	3	2	Masazumi Gotoda	Tokushima 1st	77.8%
CDP	291,870 (17.2%)	1	1	Yoichi Shiraishi	Ehime 3rd	93.8%
Komei	233,407 (13.7%)	1	1	Masayasu Yamasaki		
Ishin	173,826 (10.2%)	1	1	Tomoyo Yoshida	Tokushima 1st	20.1%

== Kyushu block ==
2021 Japanese general election in Kyushu
- 31 October 2021

All 55 seats to the House of Representatives
	Majority party	Minority party	Third party
Party	LDP	CDP	Komeito
Last election	35 seats	10 seats	3 seats
Constituency	22	6	0
PR seats	8	4	4
Total	30	10	4
Seat change	▼5	0	▲1
	Fourth party	Fifth party	Sixth party
Party	Ishin	JCP	DPP
Last election	1 seat	2 seats	New
Constituency	0	1	1
PR seats	2	1	1
Total	2	2	2
Seat change	▲1	0	▲2
	Seventh party	Eighth party
Party	SDP	Ind.
Last election	2 seats	2 seats
Constituency	1	4
PR seats	0	–
Total	1	4
Seat change	▼1	▲2

Single-member constituency results in Kyushu
Constituency	Previous member		Elected member		Votes	%	Margin	Runner-up		%	Status
Fukuoka 1st	Takahiro Inoue	LDP	Takahiro Inoue	LDP	99,430	47.5	45,675	Susumu Tsubota	CDP	25.7	LDP hold
Fukuoka 2nd	Makoto Oniki	LDP	Makoto Oniki	LDP	109,382	46.0	8,124	Shuji Inatomi	CDP	42.6	LDP hold
Fukuoka 3rd	Atsushi Koga	LDP	Atsushi Koga	LDP	135,031	57.9	36,727	Koichi Yamauchi	CDP	42.1	LDP hold
Fukuoka 4th	Hideki Miyauchi	LDP	Hideki Miyauchi	LDP	96,023	49.4	46,088	Shintaro Morimoto	CDP	25.7	LDP hold
Fukuoka 5th	Yoshiaki Harada	LDP	Kaname Tsutsumi	CDP	125,315	53.1	14,609	Yoshiaki Harada	LDP	46.9	CDP gain from LDP
Fukuoka 6th	Jiro Hatoyama	LDP	Jiro Hatoyama	LDP	125,366	67.4	86,788	Toru Tanabe	CDP	20.8	LDP hold
Fukuoka 7th	Satoshi Fujimaru	LDP	Satoshi Fujimaru	LDP	92,233	62.3	36,413	Tsuyoshi Aoki	CDP	37.7	LDP hold
Fukuoka 8th	Tarō Asō	LDP	Tarō Asō	LDP	104,924	59.6	66,841	Shoko Kawano	JCP	21.6	LDP hold
Fukuoka 9th	Asahiko Mihara	LDP	Rintaro Ogata	Ind.	91,591	48.1	15,110	Asahiko Mihara	LDP	40.2	Ind. gain from LDP
Fukuoka 10th	Kozo Yamamoto	LDP	Takashi Kii	CDP	85,361	44.5	3,479	Kozo Yamamoto	LDP	42.7	CDP gain from LDP
Fukuoka 11th	Ryota Takeda	LDP	Ryota Takeda	LDP	75,997	55.8	35,001	Tomonobu Murakami	Ind.	30.1	LDP hold
Saga 1st	Kazuhiro Haraguchi	CDP	Kazuhiro Haraguchi	CDP	92,452	50.0	133	Kazuchika Iwata	LDP	50.0	CDP hold
Saga 2nd	Hiroshi Ogushi	CDP	Hiroshi Ogushi	CDP	106,608	52.0	8,384	Yasushi Furukawa	LDP	48.0	CDP hold
Nagasaki 1st	Hideko Nishioka	DPFP	Hideko Nishioka	DPFP	101,877	56.1	32,824	Takiichiro Hatsumura	LDP	38.0	DPFP hold
Nagasaki 2nd	Kanji Kato	LDP	Ryusho Kato	LDP	95,271	58.2	26,866	Koichi Matsudaira	CDP	41.8	LDP hold
Nagasaki 3rd	Yaichi Tanigawa	LDP	Yaichi Tanigawa	LDP	57,223	40.7	2,034	Katsuhiko Yamada	CDP	39.2	LDP hold
Nagasaki 4th	Seigo Kitamura	LDP	Seigo Kitamura	LDP	55,968	42.1	391	Seiichi Suetsugu	CDP	41.8	LDP hold
Kumamoto 1st	Minoru Kihara	LDP	Minoru Kihara	LDP	131,371	61.0	47,529	Daizo Hamada	CDP	39.0	LDP hold
Kumamoto 2nd	Takeshi Noda	LDP	Daisuke Nishino	Ind.	110,310	60.6	50,219	Takeshi Noda	LDP	33.0	Ind. gain from LDP
Kumamoto 3rd	Tetsushi Sakamoto	LDP	Tetsushi Sakamoto	LDP	125,158	71.2	87,326	Kosei Baba	SDP	21.5	LDP hold
Kumamoto 4th	Yasushi Kaneko	LDP	Yasushi Kaneko	LDP	155,572	68.1	82,606	Masayoshi Yagami	CDP	31.9	LDP hold
Oita 1st	Yoichi Anami	LDP	Shuji Kira	Ind.	97,117	48.8	21,185	Maiko Takahashi	LDP	38.1	Ind. gain from LDP
Oita 2nd	Seishirō Etō	LDP	Seishirō Etō	LDP	79,433	50.2	654	Hajime Yoshikawa	CDP	49.8	LDP hold
Oita 3rd	Takeshi Iwaya	LDP	Takeshi Iwaya	LDP	102,807	58.4	29,648	Katsuhiko Yokomitsu	CDP	41.6	LDP hold
Miyazaki 1st	Shunsuke Takei	LDP	Sō Watanabe	CDP	60,719	32.6	1,070	Shunsuke Takei	LDP	32.0	CDP gain from LDP
Miyazaki 2nd	Taku Etō	LDP	Taku Etō	LDP	94,156	62.2	36,946	Shinji Nagatomo	DPFP	37.8	LDP hold
Miyazaki 3rd	Yoshihisa Furukawa	LDP	Yoshihisa Furukawa	LDP	111,845	80.7	91,503	Takashi Matsumoto	JCP	14.7	LDP hold
Kagoshima 1st	Hiroshi Kawauchi	CDP	Takuma Miyaji	LDP	101,251	53.2	12,019	Hiroshi Kawauchi	CDP	46.8	LDP gain from CDP
Kagoshima 2nd	Masuo Kaneko	LDP	Satoshi Mitazono	Ind.	92,614	47.7	12,145	Masuo Kaneko	LDP	41.4	Ind. gain from LDP
Kagoshima 3rd	Yasuhiro Ozato	LDP	Takeshi Noma	CDP	104,053	53.9	14,943	Yasuhiro Ozato	LDP	46.1	CDP gain from LDP
Kagoshima 4th	Hiroshi Moriyama	LDP	Hiroshi Moriyama	LDP	127,131	69.5	78,054	Atsuko Yonenaga	SDP	26.8	LDP hold
Okinawa 1st	Seiken Akamine	JCP	Seiken Akamine	JCP	61,519	42.2	6,987	Konosuke Kokuba	LDP	37.4	JCP hold
Okinawa 2nd	Kantoku Teruya	SDP	Kunio Arakaki	SDP	74,665	47.4	10,123	Masahisa Miyazaki	LDP	41.0	SDP hold
Okinawa 3rd	Tomohiro Yara	CDP	Aiko Shimajiri	LDP	87,710	52.1	7,214	Tomohiro Yara	CDP	47.9	LDP gain from CDP
Okinawa 4th	Kosaburo Nishime	LDP	Kosaburo Nishime	LDP	87,671	54.9	15,640	Toru Kinjo	CDP	45.1	LDP hold

Proportional representation results
Party	Votes	Seats	Rank	Elected member	Constituency	Ratio
LDP	2,250,966 (35.7%)	8	1	Masahiro Imamura		
LDP	2,250,966 (35.7%)	8	2	Hirotake Yasuoka		
LDP	2,250,966 (35.7%)	8	3	Kazuchika Iwata	Saga 1st	99.8%
LDP	2,250,966 (35.7%)	8	3	Shunsuke Takei	Miyazaki 1st	98.2%
LDP	2,250,966 (35.7%)	8	3	Yasushi Furukawa	Saga 2nd	92.1%
LDP	2,250,966 (35.7%)	8	3	Konosuke Kokuba	Okinawa 1st	88.6%
LDP	2,250,966 (35.7%)	8	3	Masahisa Miyazaki	Okinawa 2nd	86.4%
LDP	2,250,966 (35.7%)	8	3	Yasuhiro Ozato	Kagoshima 3rd	85.6%
CDP	1,266,801 (20.1%)	4	1	Seiichi Suetsugu	Nagasaki 4th	99.3%
CDP	1,266,801 (20.1%)	4	1	Hajime Yoshikawa	Oita 2nd	99.1%
CDP	1,266,801 (20.1%)	4	1	Katsuhiko Yamada	Nagasaki 3rd	96.4%
CDP	1,266,801 (20.1%)	4	1	Shuji Inatomi	Fukuoka 2nd	92.5%
Komei	1,040,756 (16.5%)	4	1	Masakazu Hamachi		
Komei	1,040,756 (16.5%)	4	2	Nobuhiro Yoshida		
Komei	1,040,756 (16.5%)	4	3	Yasukuni Kinjo		
Komei	1,040,756 (16.5%)	4	4	Kumiko Yoshida		
Ishin	540,338 (8.6%)	2	1	Hiroki Abe	Fukuoka 4th	38.5%
Ishin	540,338 (8.6%)	2	1	Gōsei Yamamoto	Fukuoka 1st	37.8%
JCP	365,658 (5.8%)	1	2	Takaaki Tamura		
DPFP	279,509 (4.4%)	1	1	Shinji Nagatomo	Miyazaki 2nd	60.7%

== Leaders' races ==
Results for party leaders
Party	Member	Constituency	Votes	%	Position	Status
LDP	Fumio Kishida	Hiroshima 1st	133,704	80.7	1st	Re-elected
CDP	Yukio Edano	Saitama 5th	113,615	51.4	1st	Re-elected
Ishin	Ichirō Matsui	Mayor of Osaka				
Komei	Natsuo Yamaguchi	House of Councillors				
DPFP	Yuichiro Tamaki	Kagawa 2nd	94,530	63.5	1st	Re-elected
JCP	Kazuo Shii	Southern Kanto PR	534,493	7.2	1st	Re-elected
Reiwa	Taro Yamamoto	Tokyo PR	360,387	5.6	1st	Elected
SDP	Mizuho Fukushima	House of Councillors				

== Closest races ==
Candidates with a narrow loss ratio of over 90%
Constituency	Candidate		Votes	%	Ratio
Niigata 6th	Shuichi Takatori	LDP	90,549	49.5	99.9
Saga 1st	Kazuchika Iwata	LDP	92,319	50.0	99.9
Niigata 4th	Isato Kunisada	LDP	97,256	49.9	99.8
Miyagi 2nd	Kenya Akiba	LDP	115,749	48.7	99.5
Hokkaido 4th	Kureha Otsuki	CDP	108,630	49.8	99.4
Nagasaki 4th	Seiichi Suetsugu	CDP	55,577	41.8	99.3
Oita 2nd	Hajime Yoshikawa	CDP	78,779	49.8	99.2
Aichi 8th	Yutaka Banno	CDP	120,649	49.8	99.1
Mie 2nd	Masaharu Nakagawa	CDP	109,165	49.8	99.1
Hyogo 7th	Kē Miki	Ishin	93,610	36.9	98.4
Miyazaki 1st	Shunsuke Takei	LDP	59,649	32.0	98.2
Tokyo 19th	Yohei Matsumoto	LDP	109,131	42.2	98.1
Hyogo 6th	Masaki Ogushi	LDP	87,502	34.4	97.7
Aichi 1st	Tsunehiko Yoshida	CDP	91,707	47.6	97.4
Chiba 10th	Hajime Yatagawa	CDP	80,971	45.7	96.6
Kanagawa 7th	Kazuma Nakatani	CDP	124,524	49.1	96.6
Nagasaki 3rd	Katsuhiko Yamada	CDP	55,189	39.2	96.4
Hokkaido 3rd	Yutaka Arai	CDP	112,535	43.0	96.3
Fukushima 4th	Ichirō Kanke	LDP	73,784	49.0	96.2
Saitama 12th	Atsushi Nonaka	LDP	98,493	49.0	96.0
Kanagawa 12th	Tsuyoshi Hoshino	LDP	91,159	40.7	95.9
Fukuoka 10th	Kozo Yamamoto	LDP	81,882	42.7	95.9
Kanagawa 13th	Akira Amari	LDP	124,595	48.9	95.8
Shizuoka 6th	Shu Watanabe	CDP	99,758	44.1	95.8
Tochigi 4th	Takao Fujioka	CDP	107,043	48.9	95.7
Chiba 9th	Masatoshi Akimoto	LDP	102,741	48.9	95.7
Fukushima 1st	Yoshitami Kameoka	LDP	118,074	48.9	95.5
Tokyo 6th	Takao Ochi	LDP	105,186	38.3	95.5
Ibaraki 7th	Kishirō Nakamura	CDP	70,843	44.3	95.3
Kanagawa 4th	Keiichiro Asao	Ind.	63,687	31.5	95.3
Kanagawa 6th	Yoichiro Aoyagi	CDP	87,880	42.1	95.1
Tokyo 5th	Kenji Wakamiya	LDP	105,842	39.0	95.1
Tokyo 23rd	Shunsuke Ito	CDP	126,732	48.8	95.1
Ishikawa 3rd	Kazuya Kondo	CDP	76,747	48.3	95.1
Nagano 1st	Takashi Shinohara	CDP	121,962	48.7	95.0
Tokyo 18th	Akihisa Nagashima	LDP	115,881	44.7	94.9
Miyagi 1st	Akiko Okamoto	CDP	96,649	41.2	94.8
Saitama 5th	Hideki Makihara	LDP	107,532	48.6	94.6
Hiroshima 6th	Toshifumi Kojima	LDP	97,158	48.6	94.5
Saitama 7th	Yasuko Komiyama	CDP	93,419	41.7	94.4
Yamanashi 1st	Katsuhito Nakajima	CDP	118,223	47.6	94.3
Okayama 4th	Michiyoshi Yunoki	CDP	83,859	46.8	94.2
Hokkaido 9th	Manabu Horii	LDP	106,842	48.5	94.1
Ehime 3rd	Yoichi Shiraishi	CDP	71,600	48.4	93.9
Saitama 10th	Yunosuke Sakamoto	CDP	90,214	48.4	93.8
Saitama 8th	Masatoshi Onozuka	Ind.	98,102	48.4	93.7
Tokyo 10th	Yosuke Suzuki	CDP	107,920	41.1	93.7
Tokyo 3rd	Hirotaka Ishihara	LDP	116,753	42.9	93.4
Aichi 4th	Yoshio Maki	CDP	72,786	40.8	93.3
Hokkaido 11th	Yūko Nakagawa	LDP	85,336	48.2	93.2
Akita 1st	Manabu Terata	CDP	72,366	48.1	92.8
Fukuoka 2nd	Shuji Inatomi	CDP	101,258	42.6	92.6
Iwate 3rd	Ichirō Ozawa	CDP	109,362	47.9	92.1
Ibaraki 1st	Yoshinori Tadokoro	LDP	96,791	47.9	92.1
Saga 2nd	Yasushi Furukawa	LDP	98,224	48.0	92.1
Okinawa 3rd	Tomohiro Yara	CDP	80,496	47.9	91.8
Nagano 3rd	Takeshi Kozu	CDP	109,179	46.9	91.0
Tokyo 1st	Banri Kaieda	CDP	90,043	35.4	90.8
Hokkaido 1st	Toshimitsu Funabashi	LDP	106,985	41.0	90.4
Akita 2nd	Katsutoshi Kaneda	LDP	73,945	47.5	90.3
Ibaraki 6th	Yamato Aoyama	CDP	113,570	47.5	90.3
Kanagawa 8th	Hidehiro Mitani	LDP	117,963	47.4	90.1
