= Tsuneo Suzuki =

Japanese politician

- 鈴木 恒夫
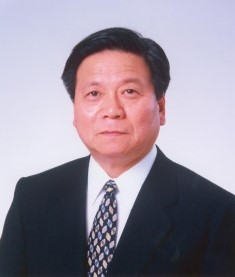
- Official portrait, 2008

Minister of Education, Culture, Sports, Science and Technology
- In office 2 August 2008 – 24 September 2008
- Prime Minister: Yasuo Fukuda
- Preceded by: Kisaburo Tokai
- Succeeded by: Ryū Shionoya

Member of the House of Representatives; from Southern Kanto
- In office 21 October 1996 – 21 July 2009
- Preceded by: Constituency established
- Succeeded by: Nobuhiko Sutō
- Constituency: Kanagawa 7th (1996–2003); PR block (2003–2005); Kanagawa 7th (2005–2009)
- In office 7 July 1986 – 18 June 1993
- Preceded by: Takashi Miura
- Succeeded by: Hiroshi Nakada
- Constituency: Kanagawa 1st

Personal details
- Born: 10 February 1941 (age 85) Yokohama, Kanagawa, Japan
- Party: Liberal Democratic
- Other political affiliations: NLC (1977–1986)
- Education: Waseda University

Tsuneo Suzuki (鈴木 恒夫, Suzuki Tsuneo; born 10 February 1941) is a retired Japanese politician who served in the House of Representatives as a member of the Liberal Democratic Party.

== Early life ==
A native of Yokohama, Kanagawa, Suzuki graduated from Waseda University.

Before his political career, he worked for 15 years as a reporter for the Mainichi Shimbun

== Political career. ==
Suzuki began his career in politics as a secretary for Yōhei Kōno, the current Lower House speaker.

He was elected for the first time in 1986 after an unsuccessful run in 1983, both as a member of the now-defunct party New Liberal Club.

Regarded as a close associate of Kono, Suzuki has been heavily involved in education and environment issues, including efforts to revise the Fundamental Law of Education under Shinzo Abe.

Although he announced in October 2007 his intention to retire from politics at the end of this term, Suzuki was selected by Yasuo Fukuda on 1 August 2008, as the cabinet's new Minister of Education, Culture, Sports, Science and Technology.

House of Representatives (Japan)
Preceded by Multi-member constituency	Representative for Kanagawa's 1st District (multi-member); 1986–1993	Succeeded by Multi-member constituency
New creation	Representative for Kanagawa's 7th District; 1996–2009	Succeeded by Nobuhiko Sutō
Political offices
Preceded by Kisaburō Tokai	Minister of Education, Culture, Sports, Science and Technology of Japan; August–September 2008	Succeeded by Ryū Shionoya
