= Ryū Shionoya =

Japanese politician

- 塩谷 立
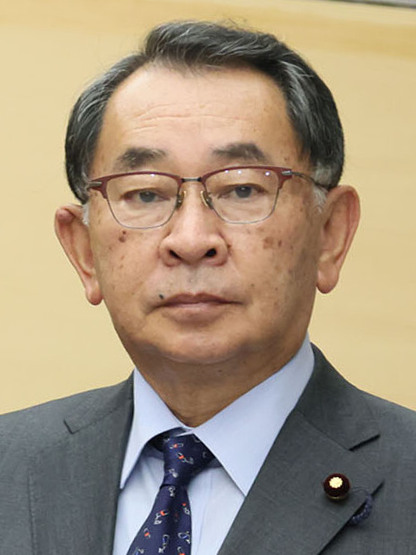
- Shionoya in 2022

Chairman of the Liberal Democratic Party Election Strategy Council
- In office 3 August 2017 – 2 October 2018
- President: Shinzo Abe
- Preceded by: Keiji Furuya
- Succeeded by: Akira Amari

Chairman of the Liberal Democratic Party General Council
- In office 30 September 2011 – 28 September 2012
- President: Sadakazu Tanigaki
- Preceded by: Yuriko Koike
- Succeeded by: Hiroyuki Hosoda

Minister of Education, Culture, Sports, Science and Technology
- In office 24 September 2008 – 16 September 2009
- Prime Minister: Taro Aso
- Preceded by: Tsuneo Suzuki
- Succeeded by: Tatsuo Kawabata

Deputy Chief Cabinet Secretary (Political affairs, House of Representatives)
- In office 2 August 2008 – 24 September 2008
- Prime Minister: Yasuo Fukuda
- Preceded by: Matsushige Ono
- Succeeded by: Jun Matsumoto

Member of the House of Representatives
- In office 10 November 2003 – 9 October 2024
- Preceded by: Yasutomo Suzuki
- Succeeded by: Multi-member district
- Constituency: Shizuoka 8th (2003–2009); Tōkai PR (2009–2012); Shizuoka 8th (2012–2021); Tōkai PR (2021–2024)
- In office 11 April 1999 – 2 June 2000
- Preceded by: Yasuyuki Kitawaki
- Succeeded by: Yasutomo Suzuki
- Constituency: Shizuoka 8th
- In office 19 February 1990 – 27 September 1996
- Preceded by: Kazuo Shionoya
- Succeeded by: Constituency established
- Constituency: Shizuoka 3rd

Personal details
- Born: February 18, 1950 (age 76) Fukuroi, Shizuoka, Japan
- Party: Independent
- Other political affiliations: Liberal Democratic
- Education: Keio University

Ryu Shionoya (塩谷 立, Shionoya Ryū; born 18 February 1950) is a former Japanese politician of the Liberal Democratic Party, who served as a member of the House of Representatives in the Diet (national legislature) and who was the former Minister of Education, Science and Technology.

== Early life ==
Shionoya is a native of Hamamatsu in Shizuoka Prefecture and a graduate of Ambassador College and Keio University.

== Political career ==
Shionoya was elected to the House of Representatives for the first time in 1990. After losing the seat in 1996, he was re-elected in 1999 but lost the seat again in 2000. He was once again re-elected in 2003, and has remained a representative until the present.

In the Cabinet of Prime Minister Tarō Asō, Shionoya was appointed on 24 September 2008 as Minister of Education, Science and Technology. This was Shionoya's first Cabinet post.

He is currently serving as the chairperson of the LDP Election Strategy Committee, as well as the chairperson of Artificial Intelligence and Future Socioeconomic Strategy Headquarters and the president of the Japan-Mekong Parliamentary Friendship Association.

== Other positions ==
Outside of his parliamentary duties, he serves as Secretary General of the Japan Scout Parliamentary Association and Honorary President of the World Scout Parliamentary Union.

House of Representatives (Japan)
Preceded by Multi-member constituency	Representative for Shizuoka's 3rd District (multi-member); 1990–1996	District eliminated
Preceded by Yasuyuki Kitawaki; Yasutomo Suzuki	Representative for Shizuoka's 8th District; 1999–2000; 2003–present	Succeeded by Yasutomo Suzuki; Incumbent
Preceded by Kisaburo Tokai	Chairman of the Committee on Fundamental National Policies; 2022–2023	Succeeded by Takumi Nemoto
Preceded by Masayoshi Yoshino	Chairman of the Deliberative Council on Political Ethics; 2023–2024	Succeeded by Kazunori Tanaka
Political offices
Preceded by Tsuneo Suzuki	Minister of Education, Science and Technology; 2008–2009	Succeeded by Tatsuo Kawabata
Party political offices
Preceded by Teruhiko Mashiko	Director of the Youth Division, Liberal Democratic Party; 1993–1995	Succeeded by Keiji Furuya
Preceded by Yuriko Koike	Chairman of the General Council, Liberal Democratic Party; 2011–2012	Succeeded by Hiroyuki Hosoda
Preceded by Keiji Furuya	Chairman of the Election Strategy Council, Liberal Democratic Party; 2017–2018	Succeeded by Akira Amari
Preceded by Katsunobu Kato	Subcommittee Chairman, Tax System Research Commission, Liberal Democratic Party; 2022-2023	Succeeded by Yoshimasa Hayashi
