= Hisato Tamiya =

Japanese politician (born 1989)

- 田宮 寿人

Member of the House of Representatives
- Incumbent
- Assumed office 8 February 2026
- Preceded by: Soichiro Okuno
- Constituency: Chiba 9th

Personal details
- Born: 26 March 1989 (age 37) Sakura, Chiba, Japan
- Party: Liberal Democratic
- Education: University of Tokyo; Columbia University

Hisato Tamiya (田宮寿人, Tamiya Hisato; born 26 March 1989) is a Japanese politician serving as a member of the House of Representatives since 2026. From 2022 to 2023, he served as executive secretary to the prime minister.
