= Satoshi Honjō =

Japanese politician

- 本庄 知史
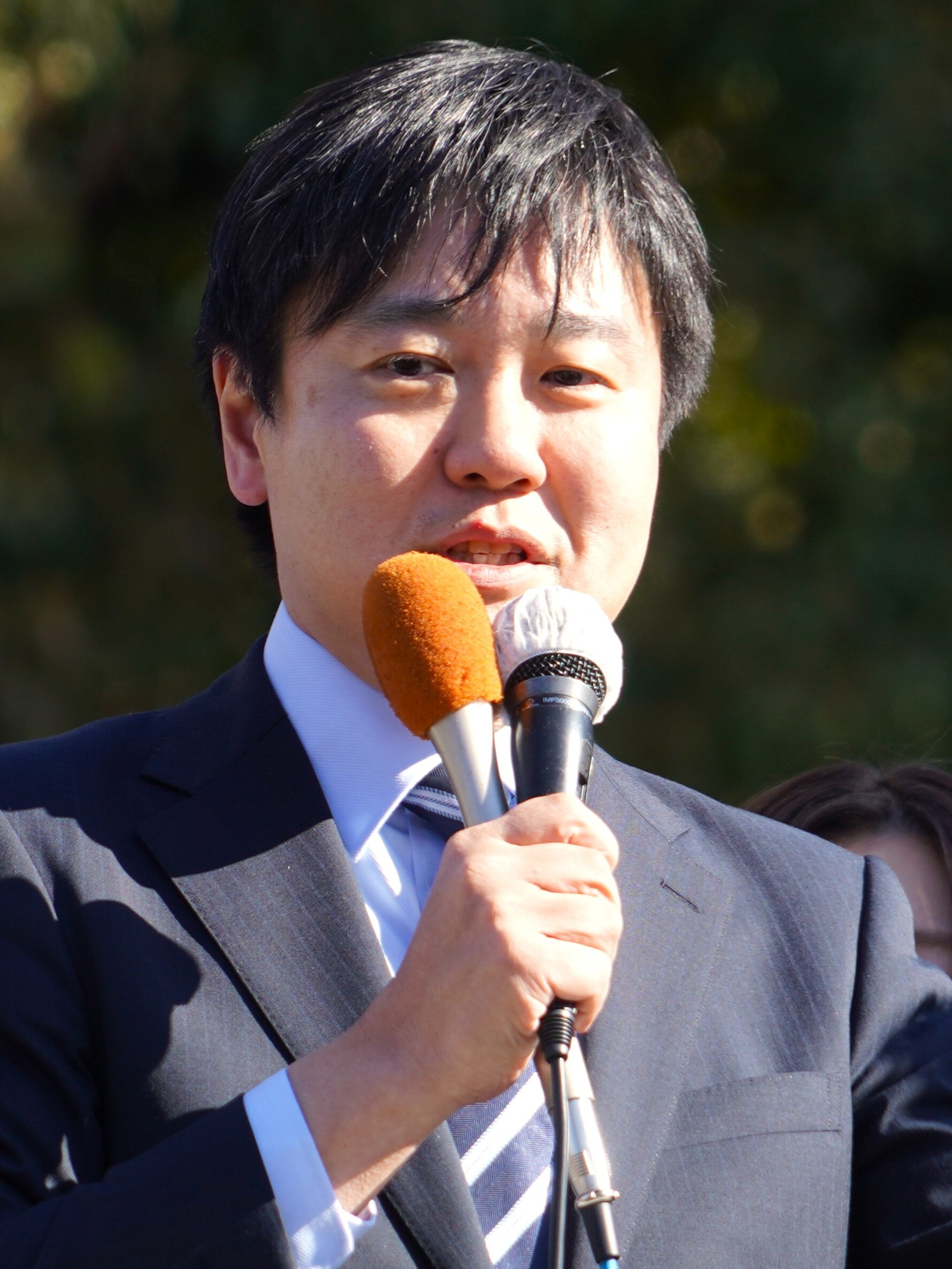
- Honjō in 2026

Co-Chair of the Centrist Reform Alliance Policy Research Council
- In office 22 January 2026 – 18 February 2026 Serving with Mitsunari Okamoto
- President: Yoshihiko Noda; Tetsuo Saito
- Preceded by: Office established
- Succeeded by: Mitsunari Okamoto

Chair of the Constitutional Democratic Party Policy Research Council
- In office 11 September 2025 – 22 January 2026
- President: Yoshihiko Noda
- Preceded by: Kazuhiko Shigetoku
- Succeeded by: Eri Tokunaga

Member of the House of Representatives
- In office 1 November 2021 – 23 January 2026
- Preceded by: Yoshitaka Sakurada
- Succeeded by: Izumi Matsumoto
- Constituency: Chiba 8th

Personal details
- Born: 22 October 1974 (age 51) Kyoto City, Kyoto, Japan
- Party: CRA (since 2026)
- Other political affiliations: CDP (2019–2026)
- Education: University of Tokyo
- Website: Satoshi Honjō website

Satoshi Honjō (本庄 知史, Honjō Satoshi; born 22 October 1974) is a Japanese politician of the Centrist Reform Alliance, who served as a member of the House of Representatives.

== Early years ==
Honjō was born in Kyoto City, Kyoto on 22 October 1974. After graduating from University of Tokyo's Faculty of Law, he served as a secretary to Katsuya Okada.

== Political career ==
On 12 November 2019, CDP nominated Honjō as Chiba 8th's candidate.

In the 2021 general election, he defeated LDP incumbent Yoshitaka Sakurada, who was prone to gaffes and often made controversial statements.

In the 2024 CDP presidential election, he endorsed Yoshihiko Noda as a recommender.

In the 2024 general election, he was reelected and secured his second -term.

On 11 September 2025, he was appointed as the chair of the CDP policy research council by Noda.

In January 2026, he joined the Centrist Reform Alliance (CRA), a new party established by the CDP and Komeito and become the co-chair of the CRA Policy Research Council with Mitsunari Okamoto.

In the 2026 general election, he lost to LDP challenger Izumi Matsumoto and lost re-election.
