= Kazuma Nakatani =

Japanese politician

- 中谷 一馬
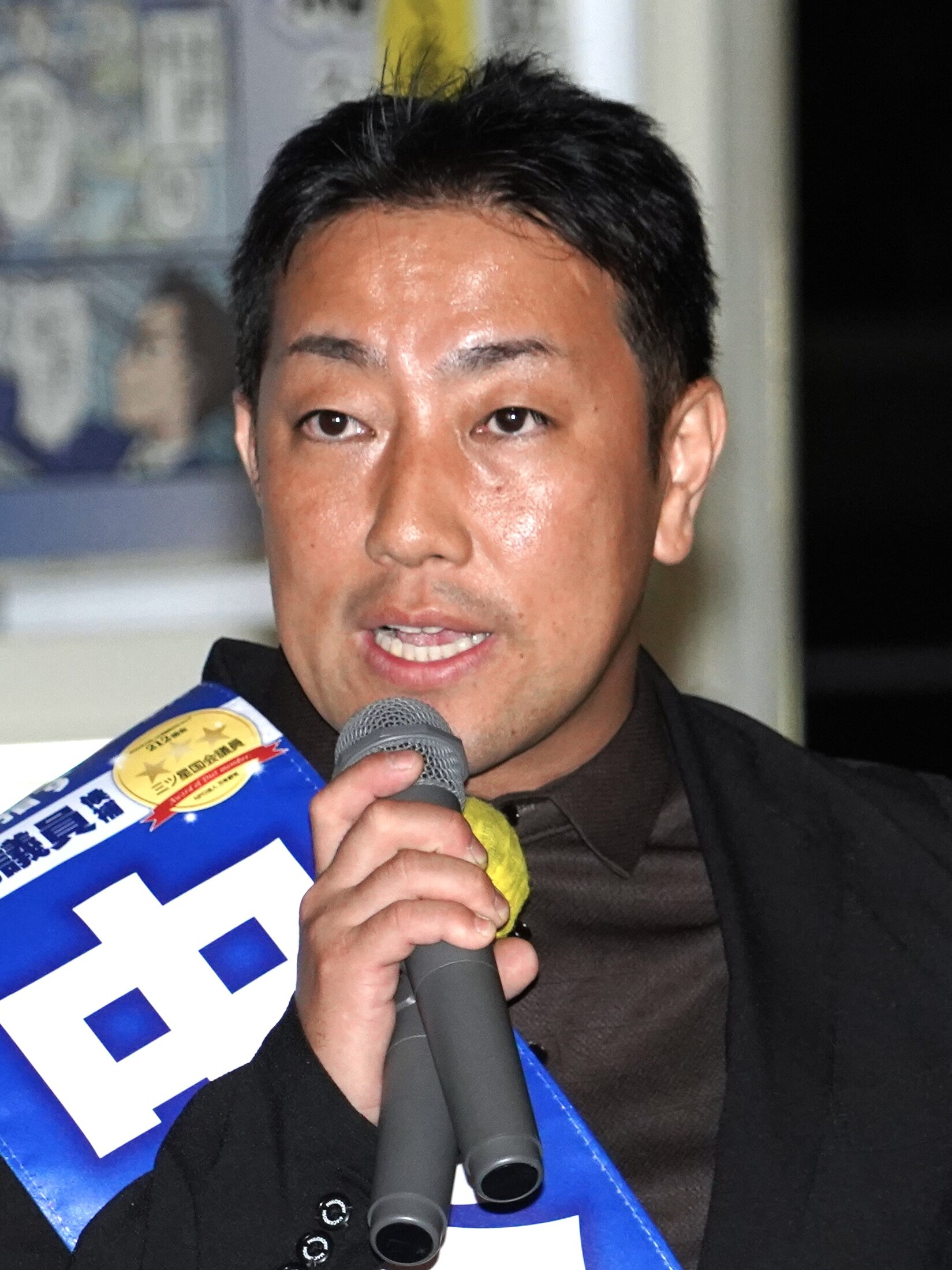
- Nakatani in 2024

Member of the House of Representatives; from Southern Kanto
- In office 22 October 2017 – 23 January 2026
- Preceded by: Multi-member district
- Succeeded by: Keisuke Suzuki
- Constituency: PR block (2017–2024); Kanagawa 7th (2024–2026)

Member of the Kanagawa Prefectural Assembly
- In office 30 April 2011 – 2014
- Constituency: Kōhoku-ku, Yokohama

Personal details
- Born: 30 August 1983 (age 43) Kawaminami, Miyazaki, Japan
- Party: Independent
- Other political affiliations: DPJ (before 2016); DP (2016–2017); CDP (2017–2026); CRA (2026)
- Education: Digital Hollywood University
- Website: 衆議院議員 中谷一馬 公式サイト

Kazuma Nakatani (born 30 August 1983) is a Japanese politician, businessman, and judo therapist. He served as a member of the House of Representatives representing Kanagawa prefecture with the Constitutional Democratic Party of Japan and the director of its youth bureau. He was previously a member of Kanagawa Prefectural Assembly.

== Early life and education ==
Born in Kawaminami-cho, Koyu-gun, Miyazaki Prefecture, he grew up in Kawasaki City, Kanagawa Prefecture. He lives in Yokohama City. He grew up in a poor mother-child family and his parents divorced when he was 11. While repeatedly moving to Saitama, Tokyo, Osaka, and Kanagawa Prefecture, he went to two kindergartens, four elementary schools, and two junior high schools.

He graduated from Kawasaki City Hiyoshi Junior High School, Kanagawa Prefectural Yokohama Hiranuma Correspondence High School, and Kuretake Acupuncture and Moxibustion Judo Rehabilitation School. He is enrolled in correspondence courses of the Faculty of Economics, Keio University. He received the MVP Award from Digital Hollywood University Graduate School, with an M.A. of Digital Content Management (DCM).

== Career ==
Participated in the founding of gumi, Inc. After serving as an executive officer, he became an advisor of gumi, Inc.

On 10 April 2011, he ran for the Kanagawa Prefectural Assembly in the 17th Unified Local Elections under the official recognition of the Democratic Party of Japan, and became the youngest person to be elected for the first time at the age of 27, the youngest of which was elected.

On 14 December 2014, he ran for the 47th General Election for members of the House of Representatives from Kanagawa 7th District with the Democratic Party of Japan (DPJ) official recognition, and was defeated second to The Liberal Democratic Party's Mr. Keisuke Suzuki. In 2016, he was appointed president of the 7th District General Branch of Kanagawa Prefecture by the DP. On 28 September 2017, the DP decided joining the Party of Hope, was effectively "dissolved". Before dawn on 1 October of the same year, Nakatani decided not to join the Party of Hope. The next day, after receiving news of the formation of the Constitutional Democratic Party, he announced his participation in the party. "Nothing is born from the logic of the exclusion of Yuriko Koike," he answered toward media outlets. On 6 October, The Federation Kanagawa decided to recommend Nakatani. The Party of Hope recommended 35-year-old female newcomer from local area, and the Japan Restoration Party also recommended the candidate. Members of Yokohama City Assembly and Kanagawa Prefectural Assembly, who are elected from Kohoku and Tuzuki District, all supported for the candidate of the Party of Hope.

He ran for the 48th General Election of members of the House of Representatives on 22 October with the constitutional democratic party official recognition from Kanagawa 7th district. While he was defeated second to The Liberal Democratic Party's Mr. Keisuke Suzuki, after all he was elected for the first time due to a proportional revival.

In May 2018, he was appointed secretary general of the Constitutional Democratic Party of Japan's Parliamentary Group of Science, Technology and Innovation. In October 2018, he was invited to the Global Blockchain Policy Conference 2018 as a leading participant in blockchain policy, along with President of Estonia, Kersti Kaljulaid, on behalf of Japanese diet members. He was also appointed director of the Youth Bureau of the Constitutional Democratic Party of Japan. In October 2020, he was appointed director general of the Project Team for Digital Policy of the Constitutional Democratic Party.

In December 2020, he won the grand prize for his book ”Politician New Generation”, at the "Gakudo Book of the Year 2020", in which a political book selected by the Ozaki Yukio Memorial Foundation

He was a secretary for Naoto Kan, the 94th Prime Minister, for about three years.
