= Minister of Education, Culture, Sports, Science and Technology =

Japanese cabinet role

- Emblem of the Government of Japan

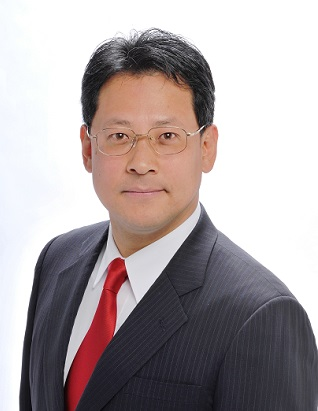
- Incumbent; Yoshihiro Seki since 17 September 2026
- Ministry of Education, Culture, Sports, Science and Technology
- Style: His Excellency
- Member of: Cabinet of Japan
- Reports to: Prime Minister of Japan
- Nominator: Prime Minister of Japan
- Appointer: Emperor of Japan; attested to by the Emperor
- Precursor: Minister of Education; Director-General of the Science and Technology Agency
- Formation: January 6, 2001; 25 years ago
- Deputy: State Minister of Education
- Salary: ¥20,916,000

The Minister of Education, Culture, Sports, Science and Technology (文部科学大臣, Monbu-Kagaku Daijin) is a member of the Cabinet of Japan and is the leader and chief executive of the Ministry of Education, Culture, Sports, Science and Technology. The minister is nominated by the Prime Minister of Japan and is appointed by the Emperor of Japan.

The current minister is Yoshihiro Seki, who took office on 17 September 2026.

== List of ministers of education, culture, sports, science and technology (2001–) ==
Liberal Democratic
Independent
New Komeito/Komeito
Democratic/Minshutō
Rikken-minshutō
Kokumin-minshutō

Minister			Term of office			Prime Minister
#	Portrait	Name	Took office	Left office	Days	Prime Minister
1		Nobutaka Machimura	January 6, 2001	April 26, 2001	110	Yoshiro Mori
2		Atsuko Tōyama	April 26, 2001	September 22, 2003	879	Junichiro Koizumi
3		Takeo Kawamura	September 22, 2003	September 27, 2004	371	Junichiro Koizumi
4		Nariaki Nakayama	September 27, 2004	October 31, 2005	399	Junichiro Koizumi
5		Kenji Kosaka	October 31, 2005	September 26, 2006	330	Junichiro Koizumi
6		Bunmei Ibuki	September 26, 2006	September 26, 2007	365	Shinzo Abe
7		Kisaburo Tokai	September 26, 2007	August 2, 2008	311	Yasuo Fukuda
8		Tsuneo Suzuki	August 2, 2008	September 24, 2008	53	Yasuo Fukuda
9		Ryū Shionoya	September 24, 2008	September 16, 2009	357	Taro Aso
10		Tatsuo Kawabata	September 16, 2009	September 17, 2010	366	Yukio Hatoyama
10		Tatsuo Kawabata	September 16, 2009	September 17, 2010	366	Naoto Kan
11		Yoshiaki Takaki	September 17, 2010	September 2, 2011	350	Naoto Kan
12		Masaharu Nakagawa	September 2, 2011	January 13, 2012	133	Yoshihiko Noda
13		Hirofumi Hirano	January 13, 2012	October 1, 2012	262	Yoshihiko Noda
14		Makiko Tanaka	October 1, 2012	December 26, 2012	86	Yoshihiko Noda
15		Hakubun Shimomura	December 26, 2012	October 7, 2015	1015	Shinzo Abe
16		Hiroshi Hase	October 7, 2015	August 3, 2016	301	Shinzo Abe
17		Hirokazu Matsuno	August 3, 2016	August 3, 2017	365	Shinzo Abe
18		Yoshimasa Hayashi	August 3, 2017	October 2, 2018	425	Shinzo Abe
19		Masahiko Shibayama	October 2, 2018	September 11, 2019	344	Shinzo Abe
20		Kōichi Hagiuda	September 11, 2019	October 4, 2021	754	Yoshihide Suga
21		Shinsuke Suematsu	October 4, 2021	August 10, 2022	310	Fumio Kishida
22		Keiko Nagaoka	August 10, 2022	September 13, 2023	399	Fumio Kishida
23		Masahito Moriyama	September 13, 2023	October 1, 2024	384	Fumio Kishida
24		Toshiko Abe	October 1, 2024	October 21, 2025	385	Shigeru Ishiba
25		Yohei Matsumoto	October 21, 2025	September 17, 2026	331	Sanae Takaichi
26		Yoshihiro Seki	September 17, 2026	Incumbent	0	Sanae Takaichi
