= Yoshihiro Seki =

Japanese politician

- 関 芳弘
- Official portrait, 2026

Minister of Education, Culture, Sports, Science and Technology
- Incumbent
- Assumed office 17 September 2026
- Prime Minister: Sanae Takaichi
- Preceded by: Yohei Matsumoto

Member of the House of Representatives
- Incumbent
- Assumed office 18 December 2012
- Preceded by: Ryuichi Doi
- Constituency: Hyōgo 3rd
- In office 11 September 2005 – 21 July 2009
- Preceded by: Ryuichi Doi
- Succeeded by: Ryuichi Doi
- Constituency: Hyōgo 3rd

Personal details
- Born: 7 June 1965 (age 61) Komatsushima, Tokushima, Japan
- Party: Liberal Democratic
- Education: Kwansei Gakuin University; University of Wales (MBA)
- Website: http://www.3ku-seki.com/

Yoshihiro Seki (関 芳弘; born 7 June 1965) is a Japanese politician serving in the House of Representatives in the Diet (national legislature) as a member of the Liberal Democratic Party. A native of Komatsushima, Tokushima and graduate of Kwansei Gakuin University School of Economics, he was elected for the first time in the 2005 general election.
