= Masatoshi Akimoto =

Japanese politician

- 秋本 真利
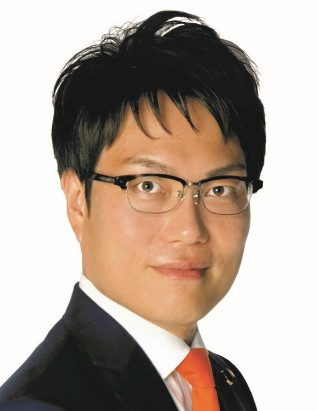
- Official portrait, 2022

Member of the House of Representatives; from Southern Kanto
- In office 16 December 2012 – 9 October 2024
- Preceded by: Sōichirō Okuno
- Succeeded by: Multi-member district
- Constituency: Chiba 9th (2012–2021); PR block (2021–2024)

Member of the Tomisato City Council
- In office 2003–2011

Personal details
- Born: 10 August 1975 (age 51) Tomisato, Chiba, Japan
- Party: Independent (since 2023)
- Other political affiliations: Liberal Democratic (until 2023)
- Education: Hosei University

Masatoshi Akimoto (秋本 真利, Akimoto Masatoshi; born 10 August 1975) is an independent politician who served in the House of Representatives of Japan.

== Political career ==
Akimoto entered the Diet in December 2012 and has been elected to four terms, initially in the Chiba 9th district and then as a member representing the Southern Kanto proportional representation block. Until August 2023 he was a member of the Liberal Democratic Party (LDP). He is opposed to nuclear power, a position that is at odds with that of his former party, and had served on an LDP panel favoring renewable energy.

In August 2023 Japanese prosecutors alleged that Akimoto accepted bribes from the head of a wind power company. According to prosecutors, the president of Japan Wind Development made ¥30 million in investments in a group run by Akimoto that specialized in ownership of race horses. Prosecutors claimed the money actually went to Akimoto, who accepted the money in order to raise questions in the Diet about not placing excessive restrictions on offshore wind power, as the company in question was bidding on a new wind power installation off the coast of Aomori Prefecture. A lawyer for the wind power company denied the allegations, saying that the money went to different investors in the horse ownership group. Akimoto resigned his post as Parliamentary Vice-Minister for Foreign Affairs on August 4, 2023, the same day that prosecutors searched his home and offices on a warrant. He resigned from the Liberal Democratic Party the following day.
