= Chiba 9th district =

Electoral constituency in Chiba Prefecture, Japan

- Parliamentary constituency for the Japanese House of Representatives
- Numbered map of the Chiba Prefecture single seats
- Prefecture: Chiba
- Proportional District: Southern Kanto
- Electorate: 402,640

Current constituency
- Created: 1994
- Seats: One
- Party: LDP
- Representatives: Hisato Tamiya
- Municipalities: Wakaba-ku of Chiba city, Sakura, Yachimata, and Yotsukaidō.

Chiba 9th district (千葉県第9区, Chiba-ken dai-kyuku or simply 千葉9区, Chiba-kyuku) is a single-member constituency of the House of Representatives in the national Diet of Japan located in Chiba Prefecture.

== Areas covered ==
=== Since 2002 ===
- Part of Chiba city
  - Wakaba-ku
- Sakura
- Yachimata
- Yotsukaidō

=== 1994 - 2002 ===
- Sakura
- Yachimata
- Yotsukaidō
- Inba District

== List of representatives ==
Election	Representative	Party	Notes
1996	Yukio Jitsukawa	New Frontier	
1996	Yukio Jitsukawa	LDP	
2000	Kenichi Mizuno	LDP	
2003	Kenichi Mizuno	LDP	
2005	Kenichi Mizuno	LDP	
2009	Soichiro Okuno	Democratic	
2012	Masatoshi Akimoto	LDP	
2014	Masatoshi Akimoto	LDP	
2017	Masatoshi Akimoto	LDP	
2021	Soichiro Okuno	CDP	
2024	Soichiro Okuno	CDP	
2026	Hisato Tamiya	LDP	

== Election results ==
=== 2026 ===
2026
Party	Candidate	Votes	%	±%
LDP	Hisato Tamiya	89,146	44.2	▲10.7
Centrist Reform	Soichiro Okuno (Incumbent)	69,444	34.4	▼9.5
Ishin	Takashi Tanuma	22,000	10.9	▼5.9
Sanseitō	Yūsuke Maeda	21,058	10.4	
Registered electors		398,113		
Turnout			51.77	▲0.53
LDP gain from Centrist Reform				

=== 2024 ===
2024
Party	Candidate	Votes	%	±%
CDP	Soichiro Okuno (Incumbent)	86,335	43.89	▼7.20
LDP	Hisato Tamiya	65,963	33.53	▼15.38
Ishin	Takashi Tanuma	33,034	16.79	New
JCP	Haruyuki Yamazaki	11,385	5.79	N/A
Majority		20,372	10.36	
Registered electors		401,047		
Turnout			50.64	▼2.37
CDP hold				

=== 2021 ===
2021
Party	Candidate	Votes	%	±%
CDP	Soichiro Okuno	107,322	51.09	New
LDP	Masatoshi Akimoto (Incumbent) (Won PR seat)	102,741	48.91	▲2.12
Majority		4,581	2.18	
Registered electors		407,331		
Turnout			53.01	▲3.53
CDP gain from LDP				

=== 2017 ===
2017
Party	Candidate	Votes	%	±%
LDP	Masatoshi Akimoto (Incumbent)	92,180	46.79	▲3.85
Kibō no Tō	Soichiro Okuno (Won PR seat)	76,332	38.75	New
JCP	Yasushiro Kamoshida	28,488	14.46	▲4.13
Majority		15,848	8.04	
Registered electors		410,963		
Turnout			49.48	▼1.49
LDP hold				

=== 2014 ===
2014
Party	Candidate	Votes	%	±%
LDP	Masatoshi Akimoto (Incumbent)	85,092	42.94	▲7.44
Democratic	Soichiro Okuno (Won PR seat)	68,564	34.60	▲6.46
Future Generations	Yuzuru Nishida	24,039	12.13	New
JCP	Yasushiro Kamoshida	20,475	10.33	▲4.74
Majority		16,528	8.34	
Registered electors		402,951		
Turnout			50.97	▼6.90
LDP hold				

=== 2012 ===
2012
Party	Candidate	Votes	%	±%
LDP	Masatoshi Akimoto	80,024	35.50	▼5.03
Democratic	Soichiro Okuno (Incumbent) (Won PR seat)	63,422	28.14	▼26.41
Restoration	Yuzuru Nishida (Won PR seat)	45,781	20.31	New
Tomorrow	Mitsue Kawakami	16,616	7.37	New
JCP	Toshiyuki Kizaki	12,601	5.59	N/A
Independent	Hiroshi Sudo	6,955	3.09	New
Majority		16,602	7.36	
Registered electors		402,578		
Turnout			57.87	▼6.46
LDP gain from Democratic				

=== 2009 ===
2009
Party	Candidate	Votes	%	±%
Democratic	Soichiro Okuno	136,932	54.55	▲22.41
LDP	Kenichi Mizuno (Incumbent)	101,734	40.53	▼16.40
Independent	Tatsuo Hatano	7,651	3.05	New
Happiness Realization	Junko Ito	4,707	1.87	New
Majority		35,198	14.02	
Registered electors		399,436		
Turnout			64.33	▼0.11
Democratic gain from LDP				

=== 2005 ===
2005
Party	Candidate	Votes	%	±%
LDP	Kenichi Mizuno (Incumbent)	140,838	56.93	▲7.59
Democratic	Hiroshi Sudo	79,514	32.14	▼10.44
JCP	Tadahira Ogura	16,307	6.59	▼1.49
People's New	Hideo Nakahara	10,746	4.34	New
Majority		61,324	24.79	
Registered electors		392,712		
Turnout			64.22	▲8.84
LDP hold				

=== 2003 ===
2003
Party	Candidate	Votes	%	±%
LDP	Kenichi Mizuno (Incumbent)	103,199	49.34	▲6.40
Democratic	Hiroshi Sudo (Won PR seat)	89,057	42.58	▲0.64
JCP	Yoshikatsu Ueda	16,892	8.08	▼5.08
Majority		14,142	6.76	
Registered electors		390,110		
Turnout			55.38	▼3.61
LDP hold				

=== 2000 ===
2000
Party	Candidate	Votes	%	±%
LDP	Kenichi Mizuno	103,381	42.94	▲8.44
Democratic	Hiroshi Sudo	71,184	29.57	New
JCP	Kazuo Seki	31,671	13.16	▼0.03
Liberal	Shin Ubukata	29,777	12.37	New
Liberal League	Kiyoshi Furuhashi	4,733	1.96	New
Majority		32,197	13.37	
Registered electors		428,734		
Turnout			58.99	
LDP hold				

=== 1996 ===
1996
Party	Candidate	Votes	%	±%
New Frontier	Yukio Jitsukawa	79,539	36.26	New
LDP	Kenichi Mizuno	75,667	34.50	New
Democratic	Yasutami Ota	35,211	16.05	New
JCP	Kazuo Seki	28,937	13.19	New
Majority		3,872	1.76	
Registered electors				
Turnout				
New Frontier win (new seat)				
