= Kanagawa 7th district =

- Parliamentary constituency for the Japanese House of Representatives
- Numbered map of the Kanagawa Prefecture single seats in Yokohama
- Prefecture: Kanagawa
- Proportional District: Southern Kanto
- Electorate: 298,006

Current constituency
- Created: 1994
- Seats: One
- Party: LDP
- Representatives: Keisuke Suzuki
- Municipalities: Kōhoku-ku of Yokohama

Kanagawa 7th district (神奈川県第7区, Kanagawa-ken dai-nanaku or simply 神奈川7区, Kanagawa-nanaku) is a single-member constituency of the House of Representatives in the national Diet of Japan located in Kanagawa Prefecture.

== Areas covered ==
=== Since 2022 ===
- Yokohama city
  - Kōhoku-ku

=== 2017 - 2022 ===
- Yokohama city
  - Kōhoku-ku
  - Part of Tsuzuki-ku

=== 2002 - 2017 ===
- Yokohama city
  - Kōhoku-ku
  - Tsuzuki-ku

=== 1994 - 2002 ===
- Yokohama city
  - Kōhoku-ku
  - Midori-ku
  - Tsuzuki-ku

== List of representatives ==
| Election | Representative | Party | Notes |
|---|---|---|---|
| 1996 | Tsuneo Suzuki | LDP | |
| 2000 | Tsuneo Suzuki | LDP | |
| 2003 | Nobuhiko Suto | Democratic | |
| 2005 | Tsuneo Suzuki | LDP | |
| 2009 | Nobuhiko Suto | Democratic | |
| 2012 | Keisuke Suzuki | LDP | |
| 2014 | Keisuke Suzuki | LDP | |
| 2017 | Keisuke Suzuki | LDP | |
| 2021 | Keisuke Suzuki | LDP | |
| 2024 | Kazuma Nakatani | CDP | |
| 2026 | Keisuke Suzuki | LDP | |

== Election results ==
=== 2026 ===
2026
| Party | Candidate | Votes | % | ±% |
|---|---|---|---|---|
| LDP | Keisuke Suzuki | 107,464 | 62.1 | ▲25.07 |
| Centrist Reform | Kazuma Nakatani (Incumbent) | 65,524 | 37.9 | ▼5.52 |
| Majority | | 41,940 | 24.2 | ▲17.81 |
| Registered electors | | 300,936 | | |
| Turnout | | 172,988 | 60.07 | ▲2.88 |
| LDP gain from Centrist Reform | | | | |

=== 2024 ===
2024
| Party | Candidate | Votes | % | ±% |
|---|---|---|---|---|
| CDP | Kazuma Nakatani | 71,913 | 43.42 | ▼5.72 |
| LDP | Keisuke Suzuki (Incumbent) (Won PR seat) | 61,337 | 37.03 | ▼13.83 |
| Ishin | Tomijiro Munakata | 16,697 | 10.08 | New |
| Independent | Takuo Ohno | 15,678 | 9.47 | New |
| Majority | | 10,576 | 6.39 | |
| Registered electors | | 298,795 | | |
| Turnout | | | 57.19 | ▼0.39 |
| CDP gain from LDP | | | | |

=== 2021 ===
2021
| Party | Candidate | Votes | % | ±% |
|---|---|---|---|---|
| LDP | Keisuke Suzuki (Incumbent) | 128,870 | 50.86 | ▲3.86 |
| CDP | Kazuma Nakatani (Won PR seat) | 124,524 | 49.14 | New |
| Majority | | 4,346 | 1.72 | |
| Registered electors | | 449,449 | | |
| Turnout | | | 57.58 | ▲5.99 |
| LDP hold | | | | |

=== 2017 ===
2017
| Party | Candidate | Votes | % | ±% |
|---|---|---|---|---|
| LDP | Keisuke Suzuki (Incumbent) | 103,324 | 47.00 | ▲2.62 |
| CDP | Kazuma Nakatani (Won PR seat) | 87,819 | 39.95 | New |
| Kibō no Tō | Anne Kawano | 28,685 | 13.05 | New |
| Majority | | 15,505 | 7.05 | |
| Registered electors | | 434,882 | | |
| Turnout | | | 51.59 | ▼2.29 |
| LDP hold | | | | |

=== 2014 ===
2014
| Party | Candidate | Votes | % | ±% |
|---|---|---|---|---|
| LDP | Keisuke Suzuki (Incumbent) | 101,088 | 44.38 | ▲2.25 |
| Democratic | Kazuma Nakatani | 50,511 | 22.17 | ▲0.71 |
| Innovation | Yuki Toyota | 39,964 | 17.54 | New |
| JCP | Nanako Ōyama | 26,151 | 11.48 | ▲6.54 |
| Future Generations | Manabu Matsuda | 10,073 | 4.42 | New |
| Majority | | 50,577 | 22.21 | |
| Registered electors | | 433,936 | | |
| Turnout | | | 53.88 | |
| LDP hold | | | | |

=== 2012 ===
2012
| Party | Candidate | Votes | % | ±% |
|---|---|---|---|---|
| LDP | Keisuke Suzuki | 105,920 | 42.13 | ▲2.14 |
| Your | Asako Tanaka | 58,380 | 23.22 | New |
| Democratic | Nobuhiko Suto (Incumbent) | 53,958 | 21.46 | ▼35.73 |
| Tomorrow | Makoto Yamazaki | 20,743 | 8.25 | New |
| JCP | Tsunekazu Higa | 12,422 | 4.94 | N/A |
| Majority | | 47,540 | 18.91 | |
| Registered electors | | | | |
| Turnout | | | | |
| LDP gain from Democratic | | | | |

=== 2009 ===
2009
| Party | Candidate | Votes | % | ±% |
|---|---|---|---|---|
| Democratic | Nobuhiko Suto | 157,070 | 57.19 | ▲20.80 |
| LDP | Keisuke Suzuki | 109,844 | 39.99 | ▼17.07 |
| Happiness Realization | Satoshi Ishii | 7,731 | 2.81 | New |
| Majority | | 47,226 | 17.20 | |
| Registered electors | | | | |
| Turnout | | | | |
| Democratic gain from LDP | | | | |

=== 2005 ===
2005
| Party | Candidate | Votes | % | ±% |
|---|---|---|---|---|
| LDP | Tsuneo Suzuki | 145,371 | 57.06 | ▲11.75 |
| Democratic | Nobuhiko Suto (Incumbent) | 92,721 | 36.39 | ▼10.19 |
| JCP | Tsunekazu Higa | 16,689 | 6.55 | ▼1.56 |
| Majority | | 52,650 | 20.67 | |
| Registered electors | | | | |
| Turnout | | | | |
| LDP gain from Democratic | | | | |

=== 2003 ===
2003
| Party | Candidate | Votes | % | ±% |
|---|---|---|---|---|
| Democratic | Nobuhiko Suto | 96,479 | 46.58 | ▲1.97 |
| LDP | Tsuneo Suzuki (Incumbent) (Won PR seat) | 93,857 | 45.31 | ▲13.05 |
| JCP | Masako Matsuzaka | 16,796 | 8.11 | ▼2.04 |
| Majority | | 2,622 | 1.27 | |
| Registered electors | | | | |
| Turnout | | | | |
| Democratic gain from LDP | | | | |

=== 2000 ===
2000
| Party | Candidate | Votes | % | ±% |
|---|---|---|---|---|
| LDP | Tsuneo Suzuki (Incumbent) | 85,340 | 32.26 | ▼1.58 |
| Democratic | Nobuhiko Suto (Won PR seat) | 80,189 | 30.31 | New |
| Liberal | Takeshi Hidaka (Won PR seat) | 37,827 | 14.30 | New |
| Social Democratic | Mamoru Ishihara | 29,620 | 11.20 | New |
| JCP | Kunio Sato | 26,861 | 10.15 | ▼2.74 |
| Liberal League | Hiroto Hayakawa | 4,697 | 1.78 | ▲0.83 |
| Majority | | 5,151 | 1.95 | |
| Registered electors | | | | |
| Turnout | | | | |
| LDP hold | | | | |

=== 1996 ===
1996
| Party | Candidate | Votes | % | ±% |
|---|---|---|---|---|
| LDP | Tsuneo Suzuki | 75,599 | 33.84 | New |
| New Frontier | Terumichi Suzuki | 54,275 | 24.29 | New |
| Democratic | Nobuhiko Suto | 50,365 | 22.54 | New |
| JCP | Kazuto Takahashi | 28,811 | 12.89 | New |
| Independent | Keikō Hakariya | 12,258 | 5.49 | New |
| Liberal League | Takashi Miyagawa | 2,120 | 0.95 | New |
| Majority | | 21,324 | 9.55 | |
| Registered electors | | | | |
| Turnout | | | | |
| LDP win (new seat) | | | | |
