= Eri Tokunaga =

Eri Tokunaga may refer to:

- Eri Tokunaga (politician)
- Eri Tokunaga (actress)
