= Ryuji Koizumi =

Japanese politician (born 1952)

- 小泉 龍司
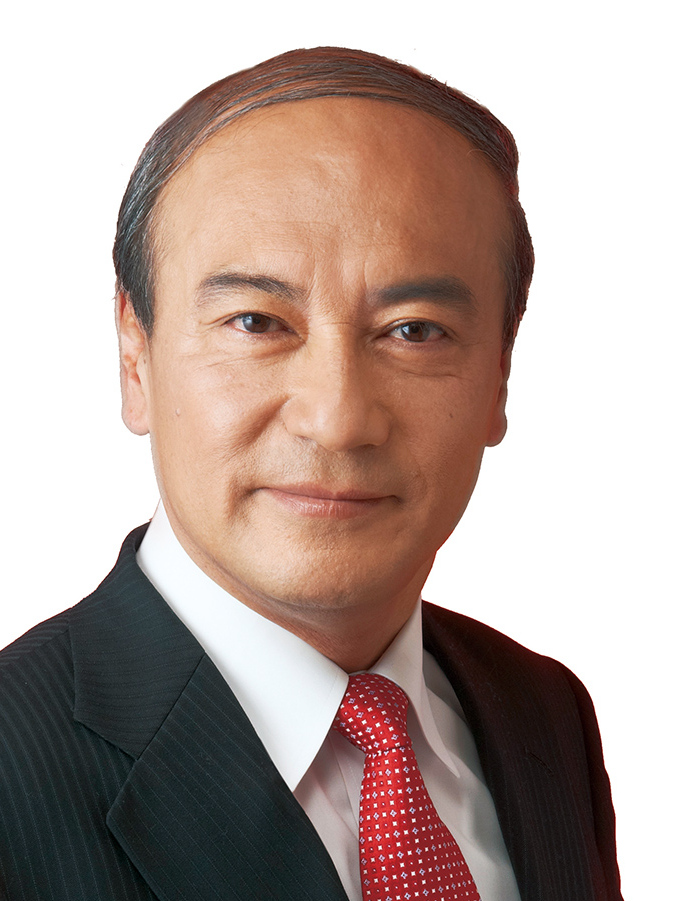
- Official portrait, 2011

Minister of Justice
- In office 13 September 2023 – 1 October 2024
- Prime Minister: Fumio Kishida
- Preceded by: Ken Saitō
- Succeeded by: Hideki Makihara

Member of the House of Representatives
- Incumbent
- Assumed office 31 August 2009
- Preceded by: Etsuji Arai
- Constituency: Saitama 11th
- In office 26 June 2000 – 8 August 2005
- Preceded by: Takuji Kato
- Succeeded by: Etsuji Arai
- Constituency: Saitama 11th

Personal details
- Born: 17 September 1952 (age 74) Chichibu, Saitama, Japan
- Party: Liberal Democratic
- Spouse: Yosakie Koizumi (died 2019)
- Education: University of Tokyo

Ryuji Koizumi (大塚 拓, Koizumi Ryūji; born 17 September 1952) is a Japanese politician. He has been a member of the House of Representatives of Japan from 2000 to 2005 and again from 2009. He served as the Minister of Justice from September 2023 to October 2024.

Political offices
| Preceded by Ken Saitō | Minister of Justice; 2023–2024 | Succeeded by Hideki Makihara |
