= Hideki Makihara =

Japanese politician (born 1971)

- 牧原 秀樹
- Official portrait, 2024

Minister of Justice
- In office 1 October 2024 – 11 November 2024
- Prime Minister: Shigeru Ishiba
- Preceded by: Ryuji Koizumi
- Succeeded by: Keisuke Suzuki

Member of the House of Representatives
- In office 16 December 2012 – 9 October 2024
- Constituency: Northern Kanto PR
- In office 11 September 2005 – 21 July 2009
- Constituency: Northern Kanto PR

Personal details
- Born: 牧原 秀樹 (Makihara Hideki); 4 June 1971 (age 55) Tokyo, Japan
- Party: Liberal Democratic
- Education: University of Tokyo; Georgetown University

Hideki Makihara (牧原 秀樹, Makihara Hideki; born 1971) is a Japanese politician of the Liberal Democratic Party who served in the House of Representatives in the Diet (national legislature).

A native of Tokyo, Makihara attended the University of Tokyo and law school at Georgetown University in the United States. He was elected to the House of Representatives for the first time in 2005. In 2013 he traveled to Texas to negotiate sales of shale gas to Japan.

Political offices
| Preceded by Ryuji Koizumi | Minister of Justice; 2024 | Succeeded by Keisuke Suzuki |
