= Kisaburo Tokai =

Japanese politician

- 渡海 紀三朗
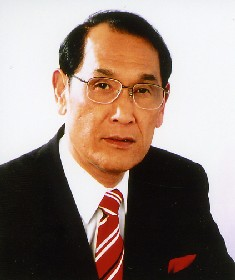
- Official portrait, 2007

Minister of Education, Culture, Sports, Science and Technology
- In office 26 September 2007 – 2 August 2008
- Prime Minister: Yasuo Fukuda
- Preceded by: Bunmei Ibuki
- Succeeded by: Tsuneo Suzuki

Member of the House of Representatives
- Incumbent
- Assumed office 18 December 2012
- Preceded by: Yasuhiro Okada
- Constituency: Hyōgo 10th
- In office 25 June 2000 – 21 July 2009
- Preceded by: Susumu Shiota
- Succeeded by: Yasuhiro Okada
- Constituency: Hyōgo 10th
- In office 6 July 1986 – 27 September 1996
- Preceded by: Akira Komatani
- Succeeded by: Constituency abolished
- Constituency: Hyōgo 3rd

Personal details
- Born: 11 February 1948 (age 78) Takasago, Hyōgo, Japan
- Party: Liberal Democratic
- Other political affiliations: NPS (1993–1998)
- Education: Waseda University

Kisaburo Tokai (渡海 紀三朗, Tokai Kisaburō; born 11 February 1948 in Takasago, Hyōgo) is a former Japanese politician who served as the Minister of Education, Culture, Sports, Science and Technology under Prime Minister Yasuo Fukuda from 2007 to 2008.

== Education ==
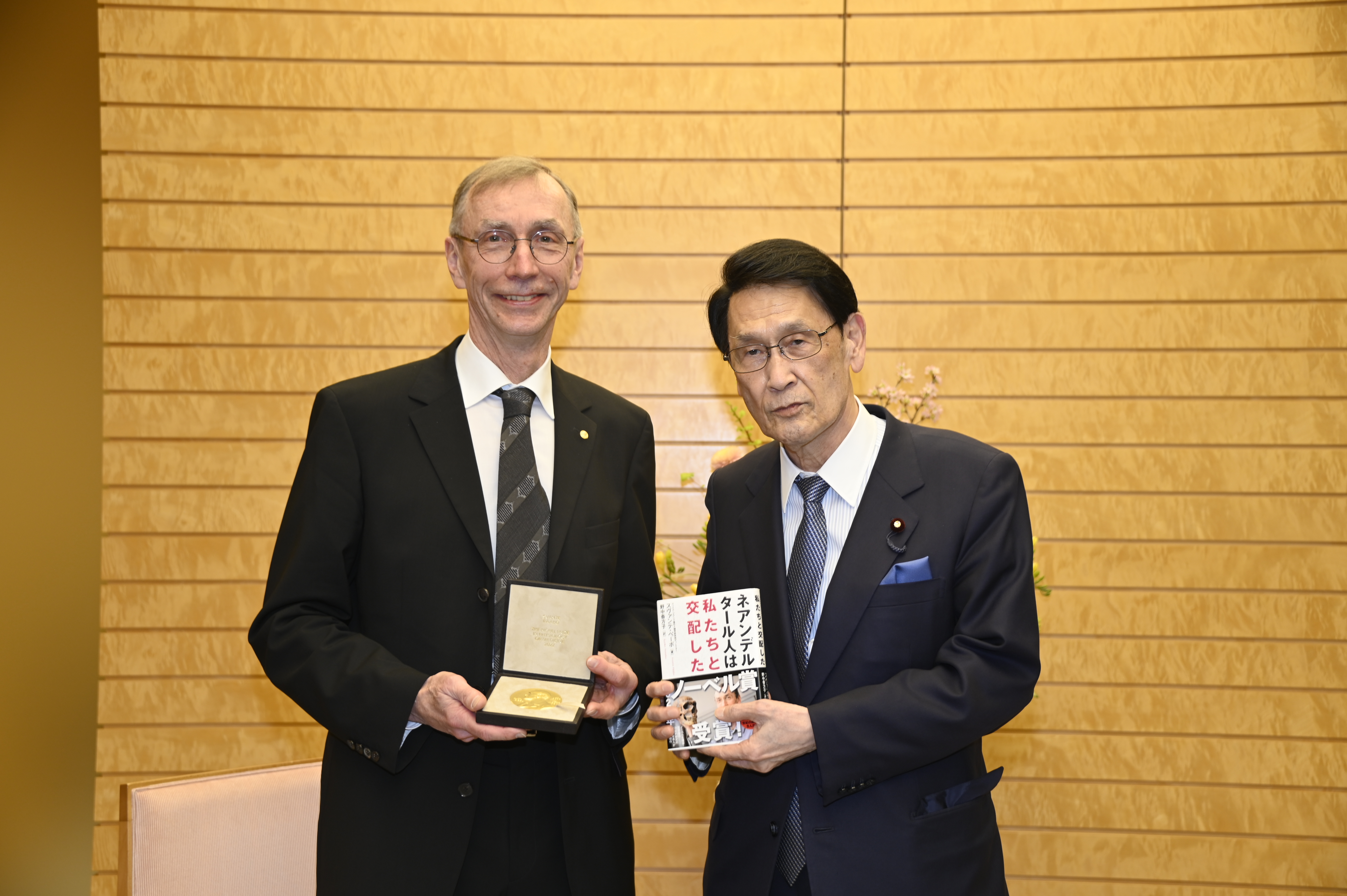
Tokai with Svante Pääbo (at the Prime Minister's Official Residence on 1 February 2023)

Tokai, like Fukuda, attended Waseda University.

House of Representatives (Japan)
Preceded by Multi-member constituency	Representative for Hyōgo's 3rd District (multi-member); 1986–1996	District eliminated
Preceded by Yasuhiro Okada	Representative for Hyōgo's 10th District; 2012–present	Incumbent
Political offices
Preceded by Bunmei Ibuki	Minister of Education, Culture, Sports, Science and Technology of Japan; 2007–2008	Succeeded by Tsuneo Suzuki
