= Keisuke Suzuki =

Japanese politician

- 鈴木 馨祐
- Official portrait, 2024

Minister of Justice
- In office 11 November 2024 – 21 October 2025
- Prime Minister: Shigeru Ishiba
- Preceded by: Hideki Makihara
- Succeeded by: Hiroshi Hiraguchi

Member of the House of Representatives; from Southern Kanto
- Incumbent
- Assumed office 16 December 2012
- Preceded by: Nobuhiko Sutō
- Constituency: Kanagawa 7th (2012–2024); PR block (2024–2026); Kanagawa 7th (2026–present)
- In office 11 September 2005 – 21 July 2009
- Constituency: PR block

Personal details
- Born: 9 February 1977 (age 49) London, England
- Party: Liberal Democratic (Shikōkai)
- Education: University of Tokyo

Keisuke Suzuki (鈴木 馨祐, Suzuki Keisuke; born 9 February 1977) is a Japanese politician who is a member of the Liberal Democratic Party serving in the House of Representatives.

A native of Tokyo, he graduated from the University of Tokyo and then worked at the Ministry of Finance. He was elected for the first time in the 2005 general election.

Political offices
| Preceded by Hideki Makihara | Minister of Justice; 2024–2025 | Succeeded by Hiroshi Hiraguchi |
