= List of members of the House of Representatives of Japan, 2009–2012 =

44th House of Representatives	(2005)
45th House of Representatives	(2009)
46th House of Representatives	(2012)

This is a list of Representatives elected to the House of Representatives at the 2009 general election, held on 30 August 2009, for the Forty-Fifth election period of the House of Representatives beginning with the 172nd session of the National Diet of Japan.

== Composition ==
=== Changes since the opening session ===
(as of September 12, 2012)

Note: This list includes not only the net result, but all gains and losses by parliamentary group except for very short transitional periods as an independent. Example: Kaoru Yosano who was a Liberal Democrat in the opening session and is an independent as of April 2012 shows up eight times: he (1.) left the LDP, (2.) co-founded the SPJ, (3.) left the SPJ, (4.) became an independent, (5.) stopped being an independent, (6.) joined the DPJ group, (7.) left the DPJ group and (8.) became an independent.

- Democratic Party – Independent Club (election result by party: DPJ 308, NPN 1, NPD 1; strength in the opening session of the 172nd Diet: 312)
  - left: Yokomichi (elected Speaker), Ishikawa, Y. Tanaka, Kawakami (resigned), C. Kobayashi (resigned), Hide. Gotō (resigned), Masazumi Nakajima, M. Suzuki (election invalid), Y. Ishida (resigned), Y. Satō, Matsuki, Yokokume, Yosano, Masaki Nakajima, Chūgo, Ishida, M. Kobayashi, Miwa, Y. Saitō, Toyoda, Uchiyama, K. Watanabe, Yoshihiko Watanabe, Asano, Hirayama, T. Kiuchi, T. Taira, Takamura, I. Ozawa, Aihara, Aoki, Azuma, A. Ishii, Y. Ishihara, K. Ōtani, Ōyama, Ōta, Okajima, E. Okamoto, Kasahara, Ken. Kaneko, Kawashima, Take. Kimura, Kikuchi, Kyōno, Kumagai, Kuroda, Ya. Komiyama, T. Koga, Zukeran, Sugekawa, K. Suzuki, K. Takamatsu, D. Tamaki, Nakanowatari, Hagihara, K. Hata, Hidaka, K. Fukushima, Maki, T. Matsuzaki, Miyake, F. Murakami, K. Yamaoka, Yokoyama, G. Katō, Nakatsugawa, K. Kobayashi, T. Koizumi
  - joined: Nakaya (proportional replacement), Tsujimoto, Asano (PR replacement), Yosano, Miura (PR replacement)
- Liberal Democratic Party – Assembly of Independents (election result: LDP 119; strength in opening session: 119)
  - left: S. Etō (elected Vice-Speaker), K. Hatoyama, Yosano, H. Sonoda, Machimura (resigned), Ōmura, Matsunami
  - joined: Nakamura, Imazu (PR replacement), Machimura (by-election), Mochizuki (PR replacement), Niwa (by-election), M. Kiuchi, R. Koizumi
- People's Life first – Kizuna (Founded as Kokumin no Seikatsu ga Daiichi – Mushozoku no Ayumi, "People's Life First – Path of Independents", until merger with Kizuna group)
  - founding members: I. Ozawa, Aihara, Aoki, Azuma, A. Ishii, Y. Ishihara, K. Ōtani, Ōyama, Ōta, Okajima, E. Okamoto, Kasahara, Ken. Kaneko, Kawashima, Take. Kimura, Kikuchi, Kyōno, Kumagai, Kuroda, Ya. Komiyama, T. Koga, Zukeran, Sugekawa, K. Suzuki, K. Takamatsu, D. Tamaki, Nakanowatari, Hagihara, K. Hata, Hidaka, K. Fukushima, Maki, T. Matsuzaki, Miyake, F. Murakami, K. Yamaoka, Yokoyama
  - joined: G. Katō
  - Kizuna Party (joint parliamentary group since July 2012)
    - founding members: Uchiyama, Chūgo, Ishida, M. Kobayashi, Miwa, Y. Saitō, Toyoda, K. Watanabe, Yoshihiko Watanabe
- Kōmeitō (election result: Kōmeitō 21; strength in opening session: 21)
  - left: Kanzaki (resigned)
  - joined: Tōyama (PR replacement)
- Japanese Communist Party (election result: JCP 9; strength in opening session: 9)
  - no changes
- Social Democratic Party – Citizen's Alliance (election result: SDP 7; strength in opening session: 7)
  - left: Tsujimoto
- Your Party (election result: YP 5; strength in opening session: 5)
  - no changes
- Tax Cuts Japan – Peace
  - founding members: T. Koizumi, K. Kobayashi, Y. Satō, T. Taira
- Reform Group of Independents
  - founding members: T. Kiuchi, Masaki Nakajima, Yokokume
  - joined: Nakatsugawa
- People's New Party – Group of Independents (election result: PNP 3; strength in opening session: 3; joint "People's New Party – New Party Nippon" group from 2010 to 2012)
  - joined: Y. Tanaka, Masazumi Nakajima, Hirayama
  - left: Y. Tanaka, Kamei, Matsushita (died)
- New Party Daichi – True Democrats
  - founding members: Asano, Matsuki, Ishikawa
- Sunrise Party of Japan
  - founding members: Hiranuma, H. Sonoda, Yosano
  - left: Yosano
- Kokueki to Kokumin no Seikatsu o mamoru Kai ("Hiranuma group"; strength in opening session: 3)
  - left: Hiranuma
  - remaining at time of merger into LDP group: M. Kiuchi, R. Koizumi
- Independents (election result: I 6; strength in opening session: 1)
  - became independents: Yokomichi (Speaker), S. Etō (Vice-Speaker), Ishikawa, K. Hatoyama, Tsujimoto, Masazumi Nakajima, Ōmura, Yosano, Doi, Y. Satō, Matsuki, Yokokume, Yosano, Masaki Nakajima, Kamei, Y. Tanaka, Hirayama, T. Kiuchi, T. Taira, Takamura, Matsunami
  - stopped being independents: Nakamura, Tsujimoto, Yosano, Ōmura (resigned), Masazumi Nakajima, Matsuki, Ishikawa, Hirayama, Takamura (resigned), T. Kiuchi, Masaki Nakajima, Yokokume, Y. Satō, T. Taira

== List of representatives elected in the general election ==
As of 16 September 2009 (opening session of the 172nd (special) Diet after election of House of Representatives Speaker, Vice-Speaker and Prime Minister)
Note: Affiliation among Representatives elected may change at any given time.

=== The Government ===
==== Democratic Party (311 members) ====
- Jun Azumi
- Yukihiko Akutsu
- Yoshinobu Achiha
- Shino Aihara
- Ai Aoki
- Hirotaka Akamatsu
- Shozo Azuma
- Shinsuke Amiya
- Satoshi Arai
- Fumihiko Igarashi
- Masae Ido
- Motohisa Ikeda
- Koichiro Ichimura
- Akira Ishii
- Toshiro Ishii
- Tomohiro Ishikawa
- Eiko Ishige
- Takashi Ishizeki
- Katsuyuki Ishida
- Mitsuji Ishida
- Yoshihiro Ishida
- Masao Ishizu
- Yozaburo Ishihara
- Hisatsugu Ishimori
- Keiki Ishiyama
- Kenta Izumi
- Kayoko Isogai
- Koichiro Ichimura
- Masaaki Itokawa
- Shuji Inatomi
- Tetsuo Inami
- Masato Imai
- Akira Uchiyama
- Akashi Uchikoshi
- Yukio Ubukata
- Takako Ebata
- Yukio Edano
- Junya Ogawa
- Ichiro Ozawa
- Sakihito Ozawa
- Masatoshi Onoduka
- Mai Ohara
- Rintaro Ogata
- Hiroko Oizumi
- Hiroshi Ogushi
- Atsushi Oshima
- Kei Otani
- Nobumori Otani
- Kensuke Onishi
- Takanori Onishi
- Akihiro Ohata
- Masahiro Oyama
- Kazumi Ota
- Seiji Osaka
- Kazumasa Okajima
- Katsuya Okada
- Yasuhiro Okada
- Eiko Okamoto
- Mitsunori Okamoto
- Ken Okuda
- Soichiro Okuno
- Tenzo Okumura
- Koichi Kato
- Gaku Kato
- Michihiko Kano
- Banri Kaieda
- Masaaki Kakinuma
- Tamiko Kasahara
- Yasuhiro Kajiwara
- Koichiro Katsumata
- Tadashi Kanamori
- Kenichi Kaneko
- Yosuke Kamiyama
- Hiroshi Kawauchi
- Hiroshi Kawaguchi (independent)
- Hiroshi Kawaguchi
- Takahiro Kawagoe
- Tomotaro Kawashima
- Tatsuo Kawabata
- Hidesaburo Kawamura (independent)
- Mitsue Kawakami
- Naoto Kan (Prime Minister)
- Takatane Kiuchi
- Taketsuka Kimura
- Shuji Kira
- Takashi Kii
- Toru Kikawada
- Makiko Kikuta
- Chouemon Kikuchi
- Shuhei Kishimoto
- Keiro Kitagami
- Kimiko Kyouno
- Hitomi Kudo
- Mari Kushibuchi
- Daizo Kusuda
- Tetsuo Kutsukake
- Sadatoshi Kumagai
- Atsushi Kumada
- Takahiro Kuroiwa
- Yu Kuroda
- Isao Kuwabara
- Koichiro Gemba
- Toshiaki Koizumi
- Tadamasa Kodaira
- Koki Kobayashi
- Chiyomi Kobayashi
- Masae Kobayashi
- Yasuko Komiyama
- Yoko Komiyama
- Hisaaki Komuro
- Nobuhiro Koyama
- Issei Koga
- Takaaki Koga
- Hidetomo Goto
- Hitoshi Goto
- Yuichi Goto
- Kazuko Koori
- Kazuya Kondo
- Shoichi Kondo
- Yosuke Kondo
- Takahiro Sasaki
- Yuko Sato
- Takeshi Saiki
- Susumu Saito
- Tsuyoshi Saito
- Yasunori Saito
- Takehiro Sakaguchi
- Naoto Sakaguchi
- Ryuzo Sasaki
- Takeshi Shina
- Takashi Shinohara
- Masanao Shibahashi
- Mitsu Shimojo
- Koriki Jojima
- Yoichi Shiraishi
- Hideo Jinpu
- Nobuhio Suto
- Chobin Zukeran
- Yoshinori Suematsu
- Kazumi Sugimoto
- Hiroshi Sugekawa
- Katsumasa Suzuki
- Muneo Suzuki (New Party Daichi)
- Yoshito Sengoku
- Yasuhiro Sonoda
- Seiki Soramoto
- Kaname Tajima
- Issei Tajima
- Masayo Tanabu
- Keishu Tanaka
- Makiko Tanaka
- Mieko Tanaka
- Yasuo Tanaka (New Party Nippon)
- Kenji Tamura
- Tomoyuki Taira
- Takashi Takai
- Miho Takai
- Yoshiaki Takaki
- Mamoru Takano
- Shoichi Takahashi
- Hideyuki Takahashi
- Kazuo Takamatsu
- Tsutomu Takamura
- Satoshi Takayama
- Makoto Taki
- Mitsuaki Takeda
- Koichi Takemasa
- Hidenori Tachibana
- Tomoko Tamaki
- Yuichiro Tamaki
- Denny Tamaki
- Kimiyoshi Tamaki
- Shinji Tarutoko
- Atsushi Chugo
- Shougo Tsugawa
- Kyoichi Tsushima
- Keisuke Tsumura
- Megumu Tsuji
- Nobutaka Tsutsui
- Yoshio Tezuka
- Manabu Terata
- Ryuichi Doi
- Seiichiro Dokyu
- Yoshitada Tomioka
- Juntaro Toyoda
- Hiroshi Nakai
- Osamu Nakagawa
- Masaharu Nakagawa
- Masaki Nakajima
- Masazumi Nakajima
- Hirosato Nakatsugawa
- Ikko Nakatsuka
- Yasuhiro Nakane
- Kansei Nakano
- Joe Nakano
- Noriko Nakanowatari
- Mieko Nakabayashi
- Yoshikatsu Nakayama
- Hiroko Nakano
- Takako Nagae
- Takashi Nagao
- Akihisa Nagashima
- Kazuyoshi Nagashima
- Akira Nagatsuma
- Takashi Nagayasu
- Hirobumi Niki
- Chinami Nishimura
- Minoru Nogi
- Kuniyoshi Noda
- Yoshihiko Noda
- Tsutomu Hata
- Hitoshi Hagihara
- Kiyohito Hashimoto
- Hiroaki Hashimoto
- Ben Hashimoto
- Koji Hata
- Yoshio Hachiro
- Akihiro Hatsushika
- Yukio Hatoyama
- Hiroki Hanasaki
- Hiroshi Hamamoto
- Kumiko Hayakawa
- Kazuhiro Haraguchi
- Yutaka Banno
- Toshikazu Higuchi
- Takeshi Hidaka
- Hideo Hiraoka
- Hirofumi Hirano
- Tairou Hirayama
- Kenichiro Fukushima
- Nobuyuki Fukushima
- Akio Fukuda
- Eriko Fukuda
- Hirohisa Fujii
- Kazue Fujita
- Daisuke Fujita
- Norihiko Fujita
- Osamu Fujimura
- Motohisa Furukawa
- Shinichiro Furumoto
- Ritsuo Hosokawa
- Goshi Hosono
- Hiranao Honda
- Sumio Mabuchi
- Seiji Maehara
- Yoshio Maki
- Seishu Makino
- Hirotaka Matsuoka
- Kenko Matsuki
- Kimiaki Matsuzaki
- Tetsuhisa Matsuzaki
- Yorihisa Matsuno
- Jin Matsubara
- Isao Matsumiya
- Daisuke Matsumoto
- Takeaki Matsumoto
- Ryu Matsumoto
- Taizo Mikatsuki
- Mitsuo Mitani
- Kazuya Mimura
- Yukiko Miyake
- Nobuaki Miwa
- Wakio Mitsui
- Tomohiko Mizuno
- Inao Minayoshi
- Takeshi Miyazaki
- Daisuke Miyajima
- Koichi Mukoyama
- Muneaki Murai
- Fumiyoshi Murakami
- Hirotami Murakoshi
- Hideko Muroi
- Kentaro Motomura
- Yoiciro Morioka
- Kazuyoshi Morimoto
- Tetsuo Morimoto
- Hiroyuki Moriyama
- Kouji Yazaki
- Hajime Yatagawa
- Kazumi Yanagita
- Shiori Yamao
- Kenji Yamaoka
- Tatsumaru Yamaoka
- Kazuyuki Yamaguchi
- Tsuyoshi Yamaguchi
- Maya Yamazaki
- Makoto Yamazaki
- Masahiko Yamada
- Ryoji Yamada
- Kazunori Yamanoi
- Ikuo Yamahana
- Gosei Yamamoto
- Shunji Yuhara
- Michiyoshi Yunoki
- Katuhito Yokokume
- Katsuhiko Yokomitsu
- Hokuto Yokoyama
- Masashige Yoshikawa
- Izumi Yoshida
- Osamu Yoshida
- Koichi Yoshida
- Tsunehiko Yoshida
- Hirofumi Ryu
- Miki Wajima
- Takashi Wada
- Yasuhiko Wakai
- Seizō Wakaizumi
- Eiichiro Washio
- Koichiro Watanabe
- Shu Watanabe
- Yoshihiko Watanabe
- Kozo Watanabe

==== People's New Party (4 Members) ====
- Shizuka Kamei
- Tadahiro Matsushita
- Mikio Shimoji
- Yasuo Tanaka

=== The Opposition ===
==== Liberal Democratic Party (118 members) ====
- Ichiro Aisawa
- Ryosei Akazawa
- Kenya Akiba
- Tarō Asō
- Shinzo Abe
- Toshiko Abe
- Akira Amari
- Masatoshi Ishida
- Shigeru Ishiba
- Nobuteru Ishihara
- Yoshitaka Ito
- Tomomi Inada
- Shinji Inoue
- Bummei Ibuki
- Masahiro Imamura
- Takeshi Iwaya
- Akinori Eto
- Taku Eto
- Toshiaki Endo
- Tadamori Oshima
- Yoshinori Ohno
- Hideaki Omura
- Yasuhiro Ozato
- Itsunori Onodera
- Yuko Obuchi
- Hiroshi Kajiyama
- Katsunobu Kato
- Koichi Kato
- Kazuyoshi Kaneko
- Yasushi Kaneko
- Katsutoshi Kaneda
- Ichiro Kamoshita
- Katsuyuki Kawai
- Jiro Kawasaki
- Takeo Kawamura
- Fumio Kishida
- Shigeo Kitamura
- Seigo Kitamura
- Tarō Kimura
- Yuriko Koike
- Shinjiro Koizumi
- Taro Kono
- Masahiko Komura
- Makoto Koga
- Masazumi Gotoda
- Mitsue Kondo
- Ken Saito
- Tetsushi Sakamoto
- Genichiro Sata
- Tatsuo Sato (politician)
- Yasuhisa Shiozaki
- Ryu Shionoya
- Masahiko Shibayama
- Hakubun Shimomura
- Yoshitaka Shindo
- Yoshihide Suga
- Isshu Sugawara
- Hiroyuki Sonoda
- Masaaki Taira
- Sanae Takaichi
- Tsuyoshi Takagi
- Wataru Takeshita
- Ryota Takeda
- Tsutomu Takebe
- Naokazu Takemoto
- Keiichiro Tachibana
- Kazunori Tanaka
- Yasufumi Tanahashi
- Koichi Tani
- Sadakazu Tanigaki
- Yaichi Tanigawa
- Takashi Tanihata
- Ryotaro Tanose
- Norihisa Tamura
- Takeshi Tokuda
- Keiko Nagaoka
- Hidenao Nakagawa
- Tadayoshi Nagashima
- Jinen Nagase
- Gen Nakatani
- Toshihiro Nikai
- Akira Nishino
- Yasutoshi Nishimura
- Fukushiro Nukaga
- Seiko Noda
- Takeshi Noda
- Hiroshi Hase
- Kunio Hatoyama
- Yasukazu Hamada
- Motoo Hayashi
- Takuya Hirai
- Katsuei Hirasawa
- Teru Fukui
- Yasuo Fukuda
- Yoshihisa Furukawa
- Keiji Furuya
- Hiroyuki Hosoda
- Kosuke Hori
- Nobutaka Machimura
- Kenta Matsunami
- Hirokazu Matsuno
- Jun Matsumoto
- Norio Mitsuya
- Mitsuhiro Miyakoshi
- Seiichiro Murakami
- Yoshitaka Murata
- Toshimitsu Motegi
- Eisuke Mori
- Yoshiro Mori
- Hiroshi Moriyama
- Takuji Yanagimoto
- Shunichi Yamaguchi
- Koichi Yamamoto
- Kozo Yamamoto
- Taku Yamamoto
- Yuji Yamamoto
- Kaoru Yosano
- Masayoshi Yoshino

==== Komeito Party (21 Members) ====
- Masao Akamatsu
- Yoshihisa Inoue
- Yasuko Ikenobo
- Keiichi Ishii
- Noritoshi Ishida
- Hisashi Inatsu
- Yoshio Urushibara
- Yasuyuki Eda
- Otohiko Endo
- Yoshinori Ooguchi
- Takenori Kanzaki
- Shigeki Sato
- Tetsuo Saito
- Chikara Sakaguchi
- Michiyo Takagi
- Yosuke Takagi
- Yuzuru Takeuchi
- Shigeyuki Tomita
- Hiroyoshi Nishi
- Junji Higashi
- Noriko Furuya

==== Japan Communist Party (9 Members) ====
- Seiken Akamine
- Akira Kasai
- Keiji Kokuta
- Kensho Sasaki
- Kazuo Shii
- Tetsuya Shiokawa
- Chizuko Takahashi
- Takeshi Miyamoto
- Hidekatsu Yoshii

==== Social Democratic Party / Citizen's Alliance (7 Members) ====
- Tomoko Abe
- Yasumasa Shigeo
- Kiyomi Tsujimoto
- Kantoku Teruya
- Takatoshi Nakashima
- Ryoichi Hattori
- Hideo Yoshiizumi

==== Your Party (5 Members) ====
- Keiichiro Asao
- Kenji Eda
- Mito Kakizawa
- Koichi Yamauchi
- Yoshimi Watanabe

==== Group for upholding national interest and citizens' livelihoods (3 Members) ====
- Minoru Kiuchi
- Ryuji Koizumi
- Takeo Hiranuma

==== Independents (3 Members) ====
- Takahiro Yokomichi, President (gichō) or Speaker (previously DPJ)
- Seishiro Eto, Vice President (fuku-gichō) or vice-speaker (previously LDP)
- Kishiro Nakamura

== List of representatives elected in the general election as proportional replacements ==
- Kiyohiko Tōyama (2010 Kyūshū PR block replacement for Takenori Kanzaki from the Kōmeitō list)
- Daisuke Nakaya (2010 Kyūshū block replacement for Hidetomo Gotō from the DPJ list)
- Takahiro Asano (2010 Hokkaidō PR block replacement for Muneo Suzuki from the New Party Daichi list)
- Hiroshi Imazu (2010 Hokkaidō block replacement for Nobutaka Machimura from the LDP list)
- Yoshio Mochizuki (2011 Tōkai PR block replacement for Hideaki Ōmura from the LDP list)
- Noboru Miura (2012 Chūgoku PR block replacement for Tsutomu Takamura from the DPJ list)

== List of representatives elected in by-elections ==
- Nobutaka Machimura (October 2010, Hokkaidō 5, vacated by Chiyomi Kobayashi)
- Hideki Niwa (April 2011, Aichi 6, vacated by Yoshihiro Ishida)

== See also ==
- Results of the Japanese general election, 2009 (lists Representatives elected by constituency)
