= Results of the 2009 Japanese general election =

- 30 August 2009
- All 480 seats in the House of Representatives; 241 seats needed for a majority
Party	Leader	Seats	+/–
Democratic	Yukio Hatoyama	308	+195
LDP	Tarō Asō	119	−177
Komeito	Akihiro Ota	21	−10
JCP	Kazuo Shii	9	0
Social Democratic	Mizuho Fukushima	7	0
Your	Yoshimi Watanabe	5	New
People's New	Tamisuke Watanuki	3	−1
NP-Nippon	Yasuo Tanaka	1	0
NP-Daichi	Muneo Suzuki	1	0
Independents	–	6	−12
This lists parties that won seats. See the complete results below.
- Constituency seats
- All 300 seats
- Turnout: 69.21% (▲1.70pp)
Party	Vote %	Seats	+/–
Democratic	47.43	221	+169
LDP	38.68	64	−155
Social Democratic	1.95	3	+2
People's New	1.04	3	−1
Your	0.87	2	New
NP-Nippon	0.31	3	+1
Independents	2.81	6	−12
This lists parties that won seats. See the complete results below.
- Proportional seats
- All 180 seats
- Turnout: 69.19% (▲1.73pp)
Party	Vote %	Seats	+/–
Democratic	42.41	87	+26
LDP	26.73	55	−22
Komeito	11.45	21	−2
JCP	7.03	9	0
Social Democratic	4.27	4	−2
Your	4.27	5	New
NP-Daichi	0.62	1	0
This lists parties that won seats. See the complete results below.
Results by constituency and PR seats, shaded according to vote strength
Prime Minister before	Prime Minister after
Tarō Asō; LDP	Yukio Hatoyama; Democratic

This article presents detailed results of the 2009 Japanese general election. The results are separated into each of the eleven proportional representation blocks and their corresponding prefectures. In the following tables, candidates elected via single-member district are highlighted in green, while candidates elected via proportional representation are highlighted in red.

== Electoral system ==
The House of Representatives is elected via parallel voting. In the 2009 election, 300 members were elected in single-member districts and 180 via party-list proportional representation in eleven multi-member constituencies, referred to as "PR blocks". Single-member districts are apportioned between prefectures and numbered (1st, 2nd, etc.). Candidates may run solely in a single-member district, solely in PR, or both (dual listing). Dual listed candidates must win at least 10% of the vote in their single-member district in order to be eligible for election via PR. Dual listed candidates who win their single-member district race are not eligible for election via PR.

Candidates on PR lists may be ranked sequentially or, if they are dual listed, ranked equally with one another. If ranked equally, the best-loser ratio (sekihairitsu) of each candidate determines the order of election. This number is determined by dividing their single-member district votes by those of the winning candidate in that district. In this way, the losing candidates who performed best will be elected first.

If a party wins more PR seats than they have eligible candidates on their list, the unfilled seats will be distributed to other parties in accordance with the PR formula.

== Hokkaido block ==
2009 Japanese general election in Hokkaido
- 30 August 2009

All 20 seats to the House of Representatives
	Majority party	Minority party
Party	DPJ	LDP
Last election	11 seats	7 seats
Constituency	11	1
PR seats	4	2
Total	15	3
Seat change	▲4	▼4
	Third party	Fourth party
Party	Daichi	Komei
Last election	1 seat	1 seat
Constituency	0	0
PR seats	1	1
Total	1	1
Seat change	0	0

Single-member constituency results in Hokkaido
Constituency	Previous member		Elected member		Votes	%	Margin	Runner-up		%	Status
Hokkaido 1st	Takahiro Yokomichi	DPJ	Takahiro Yokomichi	DPJ	183,216	54.3	58,873	Gaku Hasegawa	LDP	36.8	DPJ hold
Hokkaido 2nd	Wakio Mitsui	DPJ	Wakio Mitsui	DPJ	165,267	54.2	71,397	Takamori Yoshikawa	LDP	30.8	DPJ hold
Hokkaido 3rd	Gaku Ishizaki	DPJ	Satoshi Arai	DPJ	186,081	60.9	73,237	Gaku Ishizaki	LDP	36.9	DPJ gain from LDP
Hokkaido 4th	Yoshio Hachiro	DPJ	Yoshio Hachiro	DPJ	149,697	65.5	74,668	Tōru Miyamoto	LDP	32.8	DPJ hold
Hokkaido 5th	Nobutaka Machimura	DPJ	Chiyomi Kobayashi	DPJ	182,952	53.8	31,504	Nobutaka Machimura	LDP	44.6	DPJ gain from LDP
Hokkaido 6th	Takahiro Sasaki	DPJ	Takahiro Sasaki	DPJ	175,879	55.4	55,915	Hiroshi Imazu	LDP	37.8	DPJ hold
Hokkaido 7th	Hiroko Nakano	DPJ	Yoshitaka Itō	LDP	100,150	49.7	914	Hiroko Nakano	DPJ	49.2	LDP gain from DPJ
Hokkaido 8th	Seiji Osaka	DPJ	Seiji Osaka	DPJ	171,114	62.6	113,068	Keishirō Fukushima	LDP	21.2	DPJ hold
Hokkaido 9th	Yukio Hatoyama	DPJ	Yukio Hatoyama	DPJ	201,461	66.4	122,345	Satoshi Kawabata	LDP	26.1	DPJ hold
Hokkaido 10th	Tadamasa Kodaira	DPJ	Tadamasa Kodaira	DPJ	159,473	62.6	70,186	Yukari Iijima	LDP	35.0	DPJ hold
Hokkaido 11th	Shōichi Nakagawa	DPJ	Tomohiro Ishikawa	DPJ	118,655	54.0	28,837	Shōichi Nakagawa	LDP	40.9	DPJ gain from LDP
Hokkaido 12th	Tsutomu Takebe	DPJ	Kenko Matsuki	DPJ	127,166	52.4	14,476	Tsutomu Takebe	LDP	46.4	DPJ gain from LDP

Proportional representation results
Party	Votes	Seats	Rank	Elected member	Constituency	Ratio
DPJ	1,348,318 (40.6%)	4	1	Hiroko Nakano	Hokkaido 6th	99.1%
DPJ	1,348,318 (40.6%)	4	12	Maya Yamazaki		
DPJ	1,348,318 (40.6%)	4	13	Tatsumaru Yamaoka		
DPJ	1,348,318 (40.6%)	4	14	Hitomi Kudo		
LDP	805,895 (24.2%)	2	1	Tsutomu Takebe	Hokkaido 5th	88.6%
LDP	805,895 (24.2%)	2	1	Nobutaka Machimura	Hokkaido 12th	82.8%
Daichi	433,122 (13.0%)	1	1	Muneo Suzuki		
Komei	354,886 (10.7%)	1	1	Hisashi Inatsu		

== Tohoku block ==
2009 Japanese general election in Tohoku
- 30 August 2009

All 39 seats to the House of Representatives
	Majority party	Minority party	Third party
Party	DPJ	LDP	Komei
Last election	12 seats	23 seats	1 seat
Constituency	19	5	0
PR seats	7	4	1
Total	26	9	1
Seat change	▲14	▼14	0
	Fourth party	Fifth party	Sixth party
Party	SDP	JCP	Ind.
Last election	1 seat	1 seat	1 seat
Constituency	0	0	1
PR seats	1	1	–
Total	1	1	1
Seat change	0	0	0

Single-member constituency results in Tohoku
Constituency	Previous member		Elected member		Votes	%	Margin	Runner-up		%	Status
Aomori 1st	Yūji Tsushima	LDP	Hokuto Yokoyama	DPJ	101,290	44.5	32,380	Jun Tsushima	Ind.	30.3	DPJ gain from LDP
Aomori 2nd	Akinori Eto	LDP	Akinori Eto	LDP	86,654	54.0	22,320	Noriko Nakanowatari	DPJ	40.1	LDP hold
Aomori 3rd	Tadamori Ōshima	LDP	Tadamori Ōshima	LDP	90,176	49.5	367	Masayo Tanabu	DPJ	49.3	LDP hold
Aomori 4th	Tarō Kimura	LDP	Tarō Kimura	LDP	112,563	52.6	14,816	Kyoichi Tsushima	DPJ	45.7	LDP hold
Iwate 1st	Takeshi Shina	DPJ	Takeshi Shina	DPJ	116,425	60.2	65,840	Hinako Takahashi	LDP	26.2	DPJ hold
Iwate 2nd	Shun'ichi Suzuki	LDP	Koji Hata	DPJ	115,080	54.2	20,514	Shun'ichi Suzuki	LDP	44.6	DPJ gain from LDP
Iwate 3rd	Toru Kikawada	DPJ	Toru Kikawada	DPJ	122,746	67.0	65,072	Hidenori Hashimoto	LDP	31.5	DPJ hold
Iwate 4th	Ichirō Ozawa	DPJ	Ichirō Ozawa	DPJ	133,978	62.6	92,288	Yoshinobu Takahashi	LDP	19.5	DPJ hold
Miyagi 1st	Tōru Doi	LDP	Kazuko Kōri	DPJ	149,980	58.5	62,579	Tōru Doi	LDP	34.1	DPJ gain from LDP
Miyagi 2nd	Kenya Akiba	LDP	Yasunori Saito	DPJ	158,041	58.8	59,524	Masashi Nakano	LDP	36.7	DPJ gain from LDP
Miyagi 3rd	Akihiro Nishimura	LDP	Kiyohito Hashimoto	DPJ	108,718	55.0	22,821	Akihiro Nishimura	LDP	43.5	DPJ gain from LDP
Miyagi 4th	Shintaro Ito	LDP	Keiki Ishiyama	DPJ	119,926	52.9	27,316	Shintaro Ito	LDP	40.8	DPJ gain from LDP
Miyagi 5th	Jun Azumi	DPJ	Jun Azumi	DPJ	89,484	58.6	26,181	Masami Saito	LDP	41.4	DPJ hold
Miyagi 6th	Itsunori Onodera	LDP	Itsunori Onodera	LDP	100,832	63.7	46,699	Tetsuo Kanno	SDP	34.2	LDP hold
Akita 1st	Manabu Terata	DPJ	Manabu Terata	DPJ	93,097	51.9	31,345	Koji Futada	LDP	34.4	DPJ hold
Akita 2nd	Hosei Norota	Ind.	Hiroshi Kawaguchi	Ind.	93,951	42.7	1,351	Katsutoshi Kaneda	LDP	42.0	Ind. win
Akita 3rd	Nobuhide Minorikawa	LDP	Kimiko Kyono	DPJ	101,777	37.4	11,202	Nobuhide Minorikawa	LDP	33.3	DPJ gain from LDP
Yamagata 1st	Toshiaki Endo	LDP	Michihiko Kano	DPJ	106,202	46.2	1,291	Toshiaki Endo	LDP	45.7	DPJ gain from LDP
Yamagata 2nd	Takehiko Endo	LDP	Yōsuke Kondō	DPJ	166,287	65.5	85,292	Hironori Suzuki	LDP	31.9	DPJ gain from LDP
Yamagata 3rd	Koichi Kato	LDP	Koichi Kato	LDP	130,502	56.9	50,140	Hideo Yoshiizumi	SDP	35.0	LDP hold
Fukushima 1st	Yoshitami Kameoka	LDP	Yozaburo Ishihara	DPJ	156,060	50.0	19,534	Yoshitami Kameoka	LDP	43.8	DPJ gain from LDP
Fukushima 2nd	Takumi Nemoto	LDP	Kazumi Ota	DPJ	131,306	53.5	19,710	Takumi Nemoto	LDP	45.5	DPJ gain from LDP
Fukushima 3rd	Kōichirō Genba	DPJ	Kōichirō Genba	DPJ	159,826	73.8	102,968	Masayoshi Yoshino	LDP	26.2	DPJ hold
Fukushima 4th	Kōzō Watanabe	DPJ	Kōzō Watanabe	DPJ	91,695	49.4	42,346	Atsushi Watanabe	LDP	26.6	DPJ hold
Fukushima 5th	Masayoshi Yoshino	LDP	Izumi Yoshida	DPJ	135,692	59.0	46,724	Goji Sakamoto	LDP	38.7	DPJ gain from LDP

Proportional representation results
Party	Votes	Seats	Rank	Elected member	Constituency	Ratio
DPJ	2,433,836 (45.5%)	7	1	Masayo Tanabu	Aomori 3rd	99.6%
DPJ	2,433,836 (45.5%)	7	1	Kyoichi Tsushima	Aomori 4th	86.8%
DPJ	2,433,836 (45.5%)	7	1	Noriko Nakanowatari	Aomori 2nd	74.2%
DPJ	2,433,836 (45.5%)	7	22	Miki Wajima		
DPJ	2,433,836 (45.5%)	7	23	Kazuo Takamatsu		
DPJ	2,433,836 (45.5%)	7	24	Choemon Kikuchi		
DPJ	2,433,836 (45.5%)	7	25	Kazuyuki Yamaguchi		
LDP	1,491,761 (27.9%)	4	1	Masayoshi Yoshino	Fukushima 3rd	35.6%
LDP	1,491,761 (27.9%)	4	2	Kenya Akiba		
LDP	1,491,761 (27.9%)	4	3	Toshiaki Endo	Yamagata 1st	98.8%
LDP	1,491,761 (27.9%)	4	3	Katsutoshi Kaneda	Akita 2nd	98.6%
Komei	516,688 (9.7%)	1	1	Yoshihisa Inoue		
SDP	316,635 (5.9%)	1	1	Hideo Yoshiizumi	Yamagata 3rd	61.6%
JCP	315,201 (5.9%)	1	1	Chizuko Takahashi		

== Northern Kanto block ==
2009 Japanese general election in Northern Kanto
- 30 August 2009

All 52 seats to the House of Representatives
	Majority party	Minority party	Third party
Party	DPJ	LDP	Komei
Last election	11 seats	36 seats	2 seats
Constituency	25	4	0
PR seats	10	6	2
Total	35	10	2
Seat change	▲24	▼26	0
	Fourth party	Fifth party	Sixth party
Party	YP	JCP	Ind.
Last election	New	1 seat	1 seat
Constituency	1	0	2
PR seats	1	1	–
Total	2	1	2
Seat change	▲2	0	▲1
	Seventh party
Party	SDP
Last election	1 seat
Constituency	0
PR seats	0
Total	0
Seat change	▼1

Single-member constituency results in Northern Kanto
Constituency	Previous member		Elected member		Votes	%	Margin	Runner-up		%	Status
Ibaraki 1st	Norihiko Akagi	LDP	Nobuyuki Fukushima	DPJ	151,165	57.1	58,637	Norihiko Akagi	LDP	35.0	DPJ gain from LDP
Ibaraki 2nd	Fukushiro Nukaga	LDP	Masao Ishizu	DPJ	114,455	49.1	2,781	Fukushiro Nukaga	LDP	47.9	DPJ gain from LDP
Ibaraki 3rd	Yasuhiro Hanashi	LDP	Toshiaki Koizumi	DPJ	146,983	57.1	43,755	Yasuhiro Hanashi	LDP	40.1	DPJ gain from LDP
Ibaraki 4th	Hiroshi Kajiyama	LDP	Hiroshi Kajiyama	LDP	104,236	50.7	6,980	Mamoru Takano	DPJ	47.3	LDP hold
Ibaraki 5th	Akihiro Ohata	DPJ	Akihiro Ohata	DPJ	91,855	61.3	37,314	Hideaki Okabe	LDP	36.4	DPJ hold
Ibaraki 6th	Yuya Niwa	LDP	Hiroko Oizumi	DPJ	147,865	54.3	33,661	Yuya Niwa	LDP	42.0	DPJ gain from LDP
Ibaraki 7th	Kishirō Nakamura	Ind.	Kishirō Nakamura	Ind.	78,999	37.0	11,668	Kazumi Yanagita	DPJ	51.3	Ind. hold
Tochigi 1st	Hajime Funada	LDP	Hisatsugu Ishimori	DPJ	145,702	54.0	34,247	Hajime Funada	LDP	41.3	DPJ gain from LDP
Tochigi 2nd	Mayumi Moriyama	LDP	Akio Fukuda	DPJ	115,046	62.9	49,824	Koya Nishikawa	LDP	35.7	DPJ gain from LDP
Tochigi 3rd	Yoshimi Watanabe	YP	Yoshimi Watanabe	YP	142,482	95.3	135,458	Katsumi Saito	HRP	4.7	YP hold
Tochigi 4th	Tsutomu Sato	LDP	Kenji Yamaoka	DPJ	139,878	51.4	30,591	Tsutomu Sato	LDP	40.2	DPJ gain from LDP
Tochigi 5th	Toshimitsu Motegi	LDP	Toshimitsu Motegi	LDP	101,383	51.7	8,791	Yoshitada Tomioka	DPJ	47.2	LDP hold
Gunma 1st	Genichiro Sata	LDP	Takeshi Miyazaki	DPJ	122,711	48.0	12,865	Kōji Omi	LDP	43.0	DPJ gain from LDP
Gunma 2nd	Takashi Sasagawa	LDP	Takashi Ishizeki	DPJ	114,622	51.9	23,660	Takashi Sasagawa	LDP	41.2	DPJ gain from LDP
Gunma 3rd	Yoshio Yatsu	LDP	Masaaki Kakinuma	DPJ	109,173	54.0	19,737	Yoshio Yatsu	LDP	44.2	DPJ gain from LDP
Gunma 4th	Yasuo Fukuda	LDP	Yasuo Fukuda	LDP	103,852	51.9	11,948	Yukiko Miyake	DPJ	45.9	LDP hold
Gunma 5th	Yūko Obuchi	LDP	Yūko Obuchi	LDP	152,708	71.0	99,660	Tomihisa Tsuchiya	SDP	24.7	LDP hold
Saitama 1st	Koichi Takemasa	DPJ	Koichi Takemasa	DPJ	163,973	60.9	85,985	Zenjiro Kaneko	LDP	29.0	DPJ hold
Saitama 2nd	Yoshitaka Shindō	LDP	Ishida Katsuyuki	DPJ	140,892	50.0	27,972	Yoshitaka Shindō	LDP	40.1	DPJ gain from LDP
Saitama 3rd	Hiroshi Imai	LDP	Ritsuo Hosokawa	DPJ	167,432	60.0	64,063	Hiroshi Imai	LDP	37.1	DPJ gain from LDP
Saitama 4th	Chuko Hayakawa	LDP	Hideo Jinpu	DPJ	121,137	54.2	46,248	Chuko Hayakawa	LDP	33.5	DPJ gain from LDP
Saitama 5th	Yukio Edano	DPJ	Yukio Edano	DPJ	130,920	59.2	45,781	Hideki Makihara	LDP	38.5	DPJ hold
Saitama 6th	Atsushi Oshima	DPJ	Atsushi Oshima	DPJ	186,993	67.6	102,339	Kazuyuki Nakane	LDP	30.6	DPJ hold
Saitama 7th	Kiyoshi Nakano	LDP	Yasuko Komiyama	DPJ	142,556	54.9	52,929	Kiyoshi Nakano	LDP	34.5	DPJ gain from LDP
Saitama 8th	Masahiko Shibayama	LDP	Masatoshi Onozuka	DPJ	114,657	49.1	23,281	Masahiko Shibayama	LDP	39.1	DPJ gain from LDP
Saitama 9th	Matsushige Ono	LDP	Fumihiko Igarashi	DPJ	151,057	56.7	41,139	Taku Otsuka	LDP	41.2	DPJ gain from LDP
Saitama 10th	Taimei Yamaguchi	LDP	Tetsuhisa Matsuzaki	DPJ	123,089	55.1	28,310	Taimei Yamaguchi	LDP	42.5	DPJ gain from LDP
Saitama 11th	Etsuji Arai	LDP	Ryuji Koizumi	Ind.	171,000	70.7	108,966	Etsuji Arai	LDP	25.6	Ind. gain from LDP
Saitama 12th	Toshio Kojima	LDP	Hiranao Honda	DPJ	138,727	57.2	39,471	Toshio Kojima	LDP	40.9	DPJ gain from LDP
Saitama 13th	Shinako Tsuchiya	LDP	Yoichiro Morioka	DPJ	121,840	51.5	36,383	Shinako Tsuchiya	LDP	36.1	DPJ gain from LDP
Saitama 14th	Takashi Mitsubayashi	LDP	Jo Nakano	DPJ	146,148	57.2	45,674	Takashi Mitsubayashi	LDP	39.3	DPJ gain from LDP
Saitama 15th	Ryosei Tanaka	LDP	Satoshi Takayama	DPJ	120,751	52.1	34,925	Ryosei Tanaka	LDP	37.1	DPJ gain from LDP

Proportional representation results
Party	Votes	Seats	Rank	Elected member	Constituency	Ratio
DPJ	3,172,577 (42.1%)	10	1	Mamoru Takano	Ibaraki 4th	93.3%
DPJ	3,172,577 (42.1%)	10	1	Yoshitada Tomioka	Tochigi 5th	91.3%
DPJ	3,172,577 (42.1%)	10	1	Yukiko Miyake	Gunma 4th	88.5%
DPJ	3,172,577 (42.1%)	10	1	Kazumi Yanagita	Ibaraki 7th	85.2%
DPJ	3,172,577 (42.1%)	10	30	Hiroshi Kawaguchi		
DPJ	3,172,577 (42.1%)	10	31	Akira Ishii		
DPJ	3,172,577 (42.1%)	10	32	Minoru Nogi		
DPJ	3,172,577 (42.1%)	10	33	Masaki Nakajima		
DPJ	3,172,577 (42.1%)	10	34	Isao Kuwabara		
DPJ	3,172,577 (42.1%)	10	35	Tomoko Tamaki		
LDP	1,945,933 (25.8%)	6	1	Genichiro Sata		
LDP	1,945,933 (25.8%)	6	2	Fukushiro Nukaga	Ibaraki 2nd	97.6%
LDP	1,945,933 (25.8%)	6	2	Keiko Nagaoka	Ibaraki 7th	81.2%
LDP	1,945,933 (25.8%)	6	2	Yoshitaka Shindō	Saitama 2nd	80.1%
LDP	1,945,933 (25.8%)	6	2	Masahiko Shibayama	Saitama 8th	79.7%
LDP	1,945,933 (25.8%)	6	2	Tsutomu Sato	Tochigi 4th	78.1%
Komei	855,134 (11.4%)	2	1	Keiichi Ishii		
Komei	855,134 (11.4%)	2	2	Otohiko Endō		
YP	597,025 (7.9%)	1	2	Koichi Yamauchi		
JCP	471,138 (6.3%)	1	1	Tetsuya Shiokawa		

== Southern Kanto block ==
2009 Japanese general election in Southern Kanto
- 30 August 2009

All 56 seats to the House of Representatives
	Majority party	Minority party	Third party
Party	DPJ	LDP	Komei
Last election	9 seats	38 seats	4 seats
Constituency	28	5	0
PR seats	11	6	2
Total	39	11	2
Seat change	▲30	▼27	▼2
	Fourth party	Fifth party	Sixth party
Party	YP	JCP	SDP
Last election	New	1 seat	1 seat
Constituency	1	0	0
PR seats	1	1	1
Total	2	1	1
Seat change	▲2	0	0
	Seventh party
Party	Ind.
Last election	3 seats
Constituency	0
PR seats	–
Total	0
Seat change	▼3

Single-member constituency results in Southern Kanto
Constituency	Previous member		Elected member		Votes	%	Margin	Runner-up		%	Status
Chiba 1st	Hideo Usui	LDP	Kaname Tajima	DPJ	142,694	56.7	47,874	Shoichi Usui	LDP	37.7	DPJ gain from LDP
Chiba 2nd	Akiko Yamanaka	LDP	Yu Kuroda	DPJ	153,745	57.1	64,434	Akiko Yamanaka	LDP	33.2	DPJ gain from LDP
Chiba 3rd	Hirokazu Matsuno	LDP	Kazumasa Okajima	DPJ	112,035	55.5	26,258	Hirokazu Matsuno	LDP	42.5	DPJ gain from LDP
Chiba 4th	Yoshihiko Noda	DPJ	Yoshihiko Noda	DPJ	162,153	53.6	76,728	Mikio Fujita	LDP	28.3	DPJ hold
Chiba 5th	Kentaro Sonoura	LDP	Hirotami Murakoshi	DPJ	127,588	49.8	44,166	Kentaro Sonoura	LDP	32.5	DPJ gain from LDP
Chiba 6th	Hiromichi Watanabe	LDP	Yukio Ubukata	DPJ	108,270	49.4	35,869	Hiromichi Watanabe	LDP	33.0	DPJ gain from LDP
Chiba 7th	Kazumi Ota	DPJ	Akira Uchiyama	DPJ	125,647	49.1	21,385	Ken Saitō	LDP	40.7	DPJ hold
Chiba 8th	Yoshitaka Sakurada	LDP	Kimiaki Matsuzaki	DPJ	138,923	53.6	41,916	Yoshitaka Sakurada	LDP	37.4	DPJ gain from LDP
Chiba 9th	Kenichi Mizuno	LDP	Soichiro Okuno	DPJ	136,932	54.5	35,198	Kenichi Mizuno	LDP	40.5	DPJ gain from LDP
Chiba 10th	Motoo Hayashi	LDP	Hajime Yatagawa	DPJ	118,564	51.7	10,819	Motoo Hayashi	LDP	47.0	DPJ gain from LDP
Chiba 11th	Eisuke Mori	LDP	Eisuke Mori	LDP	116,937	49.7	4,230	Kenichi Kaneko	DPJ	47.9	LDP hold
Chiba 12th	Yasukazu Hamada	LDP	Yasukazu Hamada	LDP	134,298	53.1	19,377	Atsushi Chugo	DPJ	45.4	LDP hold
Chiba 13th	Yukio Jitsukawa	LDP	Yasuhiko Wakai	DPJ	118,062	57.0	37,489	Yukio Jitsukawa	LDP	38.9	DPJ gain from LDP
Kanagawa 1st	Jun Matsumoto	LDP	Mieko Nakabayashi	DPJ	135,211	48.1	17,371	Jun Matsumoto	LDP	41.9	DPJ gain from LDP
Kanagawa 2nd	Yoshihide Suga	LDP	Yoshihide Suga	LDP	132,270	46.5	548	Kazuya Mimura	DPJ	46.3	LDP hold
Kanagawa 3rd	Hachiro Okonogi	LDP	Eiko Okamoto	DPJ	125,856	48.5	36,268	Hachiro Okonogi	LDP	34.5	DPJ gain from LDP
Kanagawa 4th	Jun Hayashi	LDP	Kazuyoshi Nagashima	DPJ	89,082	38.0	18,354	Keiichiro Asao	YP	30.1	DPJ gain from LDP
Kanagawa 5th	Manabu Sakai	LDP	Keishu Tanaka	DPJ	156,328	50.9	39,860	Manabu Sakai	LDP	37.9	DPJ gain from LDP
Kanagawa 6th	Isamu Ueda	Komei	Motohisa Ikeda	DPJ	132,192	51.8	37,251	Isamu Ueda	Komeito	37.2	DPJ gain from Komei
Kanagawa 7th	Tsuneo Suzuki	LDP	Nobuhiko Suto	DPJ	157,070	57.2	47,226	Keisuke Suzuki	LDP	40.0	DPJ gain from LDP
Kanagawa 8th	Kenji Eda	YP	Kenji Eda	YP	128,753	49.1	54,209	Makoto Yamazaki	DPJ	28.4	YP hold
Kanagawa 9th	Koichi Yamauchi	YP	Hirofumi Ryu	DPJ	127,219	63.5	77,945	Norihiro Nakayama	LDP	24.6	DPJ gain from YP
Kanagawa 10th	Kazunori Tanaka	LDP	Koriki Jojima	DPJ	152,921	49.3	34,280	Kazunori Tanaka	LDP	38.2	DPJ gain from LDP
Kanagawa 11th	Junichiro Koizumi	LDP	Shinjirō Koizumi	LDP	150,893	57.1	54,262	Katsuhito Yokokume	DPJ	36.6	LDP hold
Kanagawa 12th	Ikuzo Sakurai	LDP	Ikko Nakatsuka	DPJ	110,532	45.9	41,008	Ikuzo Sakurai	LDP	28.9	DPJ gain from LDP
Kanagawa 13th	Akira Amari	LDP	Hidenori Tachibana	DPJ	138,104	46.1	1,940	Akira Amari	LDP	45.5	DPJ gain from LDP
Kanagawa 14th	Jiro Akama	LDP	Kentaro Motomura	DPJ	157,644	55.4	53,013	Jiro Akama	LDP	36.8	DPJ gain from LDP
Kanagawa 15th	Taro Kono	LDP	Taro Kono	LDP	163,470	53.2	39,056	Koichiro Katsumata	DPJ	40.5	LDP hold
Kanagawa 16th	Zentaro Kamei	LDP	Yuichi Goto	DPJ	167,721	58.8	54,380	Zentaro Kamei	LDP	39.7	DPJ gain from LDP
Kanagawa 17th	Yōhei Kōno	LDP	Yosuke Kamiyama	DPJ	139,678	47.8	33,872	Karen Makishima	LDP	36.2	DPJ gain from LDP
Kanagawa 18th	Daishiro Yamagiwa	LDP	Takeshi Hidaka	DPJ	110,239	48.8	28,018	Daishiro Yamagiwa	LDP	36.4	DPJ gain from LDP
Yamanashi 1st	Sakihito Ozawa	DPJ	Sakihito Ozawa	DPJ	91,422	60.2	44,541	Masaaki Akaike	LDP	30.9	DPJ hold
Yamanashi 2nd	Mitsuo Horiuchi	LDP	Takehiro Sakaguchi	DPJ	66,868	37.6	9,655	Kotaro Nagasaki	Ind.	32.1	DPJ gain from LDP
Yamanashi 3rd	Vacant	LDP	Hitoshi Goto	DPJ	112,894	62.7	49,283	Jiro Ono	LDP	35.3	DPJ gain from LDP

Proportional representation results
Party	Votes	Seats	Rank	Elected member	Constituency	Ratio
DPJ	3,695,159 (43.0%)	11	1	Kazuya Mimura	Kanagawa 2nd	99.6%
DPJ	3,695,159 (43.0%)	11	1	Kenichi Kaneko	Chiba 11th	96.4%
DPJ	3,695,159 (43.0%)	11	1	Atsushi Chugo	Chiba 12th	85.6%
DPJ	3,695,159 (43.0%)	11	1	Koichiro Katsumata	Kanagawa 15th	76.1%
DPJ	3,695,159 (43.0%)	11	1	Katsuhito Yokokume	Kanagawa 11th	64.0%
DPJ	3,695,159 (43.0%)	11	1	Makoto Yamazaki	Kanagawa 8th	57.9%
DPJ	3,695,159 (43.0%)	11	35	Hirohisa Fujii		
DPJ	3,695,159 (43.0%)	11	36	Tomohiko Mizuno		
DPJ	3,695,159 (43.0%)	11	37	Mitsuji Ishida		
DPJ	3,695,159 (43.0%)	11	38	Tsuyoshi Saito		
DPJ	3,695,159 (43.0%)	11	39	Shino Aihara		
LDP	2,233,560 (26.0%)	6	1	Akira Amari	Kanagawa 13th	98.6%
LDP	2,233,560 (26.0%)	6	1	Motoo Hayashi	Chiba 10th	90.9%
LDP	2,233,560 (26.0%)	6	1	Jun Matsumoto	Kanagawa 1st	87.2%
LDP	2,233,560 (26.0%)	6	1	Ken Saitō	Chiba 7th	83.0%
LDP	2,233,560 (26.0%)	6	1	Kazunori Tanaka	Kanagawa 10th	77.6%
LDP	2,233,560 (26.0%)	6	1	Hirokazu Matsuno	Chiba 3rd	76.6%
Komei	862,427 (10.0%)	2	1	Shigeyuki Tomita		
Komei	862,427 (10.0%)	2	2	Noriko Furuya		
YP	605,358 (7.0%)	1	1	Keiichiro Asao	Kanagawa 4th	79.4%
JCP	601,299 (7.0%)	1	1	Kazuo Shii		
SDP	369,754 (4.3%)	1	1	Tomoko Abe	Kanagawa 12th	43.0%

== Tokyo block ==
2009 Japanese general election in Tokyo
- 30 August 2009

All 42 seats to the House of Representatives
	Majority party	Minority party	Third party
Party	DPJ	LDP	Komei
Last election	7 seats	30 seats	3 seats
Constituency	21	4	0
PR seats	8	5	2
Total	29	9	2
Seat change	▲22	▼21	▼1
	Fourth party	Fifth party	Sixth party
Party	JCP	YP	SDP
Last election	1 seat	New	1 seat
Constituency	0	0	0
PR seats	1	1	0
Total	1	1	0
Seat change	0	▲1	▼1

Single-member constituency results in Tokyo
Constituency	Previous member		Elected member		Votes	%	Margin	Runner-up		%	Status
Tokyo 1st	Kaoru Yosano	LDP	Banri Kaieda	DPJ	141,742	47.4	11,712	Kaoru Yosano	LDP	43.5	DPJ gain from LDP
Tokyo 2nd	Takashi Fukaya	LDP	Yoshikatsu Nakayama	DPJ	138,603	51.0	40,010	Takashi Fukaya	LDP	36.3	DPJ gain from LDP
Tokyo 3rd	Hirotaka Ishihara	LDP	Jin Matsubara	DPJ	163,791	52.2	42,092	Hirotaka Ishihara	LDP	38.8	DPJ gain from LDP
Tokyo 4th	Masaaki Taira	LDP	Norihiko Fujita	DPJ	100,067	37.5	6,484	Masaaki Taira	LDP	35.1	DPJ gain from LDP
Tokyo 5th	Takashi Kosugi	LDP	Yoshio Tezuka	DPJ	149,623	50.3	28,379	Yukari Sato	LDP	40.8	DPJ gain from LDP
Tokyo 6th	Takao Ochi	LDP	Yoko Komiyama	DPJ	174,367	56.4	71,423	Takao Ochi	LDP	33.3	DPJ gain from LDP
Tokyo 7th	Fumiaki Matsumoto	LDP	Akira Nagatsuma	DPJ	167,905	61.3	88,219	Fumiaki Matsumoto	LDP	29.1	DPJ gain from LDP
Tokyo 8th	Nobuteru Ishihara	LDP	Nobuteru Ishihara	LDP	147,514	49.9	30,791	Nobuto Hosaka	SDP	39.5	LDP hold
Tokyo 9th	Isshu Sugawara	LDP	Takatane Kuichi	DPJ	140,109	47.2	14,083	Isshu Sugawara	LDP	42.5	DPJ gain from LDP
Tokyo 10th	Yuriko Koike	LDP	Takako Ebata	DPJ	105,512	47.2	8,773	Yuriko Koike	LDP	43.3	DPJ gain from LDP
Tokyo 11th	Hakubun Shimomura	LDP	Hakubun Shimomura	LDP	117,472	42.2	3,474	Yoshifu Arita	NPN	41.1	LDP hold
Tokyo 12th	Akihiro Ota	Komei	Ai Aoki	DPJ	118,753	45.2	10,074	Akihiro Ota	Komei	41.4	DPJ gain from Komei
Tokyo 13th	Ichirō Kamoshita	LDP	Tairou Hirayama	DPJ	114,653	44.9	3,063	Ichirō Kamoshita	LDP	43.7	DPJ gain from LDP
Tokyo 14th	Midori Matsushima	LDP	Taketsuka Kimura	DPJ	110,624	47.8	16,949	Midori Matsushima	LDP	40.5	DPJ gain from LDP
Tokyo 15th	Ben Kimura	LDP	Shozo Azuma	DPJ	105,131	42.4	25,077	Ben Kimura	LDP	32.3	DPJ gain from LDP
Tokyo 16th	Yoshinobu Shimamura	LDP	Akihiro Hatsushika	DPJ	128,400	47.3	14,766	Yoshinobu Shimamura	LDP	41.9	DPJ gain from LDP
Tokyo 17th	Katsuei Hirasawa	LDP	Katsuei Hirasawa	LDP	138,512	51.4	31,620	Kumiko Hayakawa	DPJ	39.6	LDP hold
Tokyo 18th	Naoto Kan	DPJ	Naoto Kan	DPJ	163,446	59.5	75,121	Masatada Tsuchiya	LDP	32.1	DPJ hold
Tokyo 19th	Yohei Matsumoto	LDP	Yoshinori Suematsu	DPJ	170,437	55.0	64,716	Yohei Matsumoto	LDP	34.1	DPJ gain from LDP
Tokyo 20th	Seiji Kihara	LDP	Koichi Kato	DPJ	136,294	51.2	40,576	Seiji Kihara	LDP	36.0	DPJ gain from LDP
Tokyo 21st	Yuichi Ogawa	LDP	Akihisa Nagashima	DPJ	142,418	57.6	62,790	Yuichi Ogawa	LDP	32.2	DPJ gain from LDP
Tokyo 22nd	Tatsuya Ito	LDP	Ikuo Yamahana	DPJ	154,904	50.6	37,589	Tatsuya Ito	LDP	38.3	DPJ gain from LDP
Tokyo 23rd	Kosuke Ito	LDP	Mari Kushibuchi	DPJ	168,346	54.4	59,818	Kosuke Ito	LDP	35.1	DPJ gain from LDP
Tokyo 24th	Kōichi Hagiuda	LDP	Yukihiko Akutsu	DPJ	148,719	49.5	26,852	Kōichi Hagiuda	LDP	40.5	DPJ gain from LDP
Tokyo 25th	Shinji Inoue	LDP	Shinji Inoue	LDP	106,201	52.5	57,828	Taro Masago	PNP	23.9	LDP hold

Proportional representation results
Party	Votes	Seats	Rank	Elected member	Constituency	Ratio
DPJ	2,839,081 (41.0%)	8	1	Kumiko Hayakawa	Tokyo 17th	77.2%
DPJ	2,839,081 (41.0%)	8	23	Mitsuaki Takeda		
DPJ	2,839,081 (41.0%)	8	24	Eiko Ishige		
DPJ	2,839,081 (41.0%)	8	25	Kōki Kobayashi		
DPJ	2,839,081 (41.0%)	8	26	Koichi Yoshida		
DPJ	2,839,081 (41.0%)	8	27	Tomotaro Kawashima		
DPJ	2,839,081 (41.0%)	8	28	Hirosato Nakagawa		
DPJ	2,839,081 (41.0%)	8	29	Koichiro Watanabe		
LDP	1,764,696 (25.5%)	5	1	Ichirō Kamoshita	Tokyo 13th	97.3%
LDP	1,764,696 (25.5%)	5	1	Masaaki Taira	Tokyo 4th	93.5%
LDP	1,764,696 (25.5%)	5	1	Kaoru Yosano	Tokyo 1st	91.7%
LDP	1,764,696 (25.5%)	5	1	Yuriko Koike	Tokyo 10th	91.7%
LDP	1,764,696 (25.5%)	5	1	Isshu Sugawara	Tokyo 9th	89.9%
Komei	717,199 (10.4%)	2	1	Yōsuke Takagi		
Komei	717,199 (10.4%)	2	2	Michiyo Takagi		
JCP	665,462 (9.6%)	1	1	Akira Kasai		
YP	419,903 (6.1%)	1	1	Mito Kakizawa		

== Hokuriku-Shin'etsu block ==
2009 Japanese general election in Hokuriku-Shin'etsu
- 30 August 2009

All 31 seats to the House of Representatives
	Majority party	Minority party	Third party
Party	DPJ	LDP	Komei
Last election	9 seats	18 seats	1 seat
Constituency	14	6	0
PR seats	6	4	1
Total	20	10	1
Seat change	▲11	▼8	0
	Fourth party	Fifth party
Party	PNP	Ind.
Last election	2 seats	1 seat
Constituency	0	0
PR seats	0	0
Total	0	0
Seat change	▼2	▼1

Single-member constituency results in Hokuriku-Shin'etsu
Constituency	Previous member		Elected member		Votes	%	Margin	Runner-up		%	Status
Niigata 1st	Chinami Nishimura	DPJ	Chinami Nishimura	DPJ	169,389	60.1	78,763	Rokuzaemon Yoshida	LDP	32.2	DPJ hold
Niigata 2nd	Motohiko Kondo	LDP	Eiichiro Washio	DPJ	122,686	52.3	35,726	Motohiko Kondo	LDP	37.0	DPJ gain from LDP
Niigata 3rd	Yamato Inaba	LDP	Takahiro Kuroiwa	DPJ	154,985	66.0	77,927	Yamato Inaba	LDP	32.8	DPJ gain from LDP
Niigata 4th	Makiko Kikuta	DPJ	Makiko Kikuta	DPJ	144,230	62.5	61,404	Yoji Kurihara	LDP	35.9	DPJ hold
Niigata 5th	Makiko Tanaka	DPJ	Makiko Tanaka	DPJ	103,202	49.1	16,749	Ryuichi Yoneyama	LDP	41.1	DPJ hold
Niigata 6th	Nobutaka Tsutsui	DPJ	Nobutaka Tsutsui	DPJ	124,894	55.4	35,222	Shuichi Takatori	LDP	39.7	DPJ hold
Toyama 1st	Jinen Nagase	LDP	Muneaki Murai	DPJ	90,377	49.9	8,337	Jinen Nagase	LDP	45.3	DPJ gain from LDP
Toyama 2nd	Mitsuhiro Miyakoshi	LDP	Mitsuhiro Miyakoshi	LDP	105,828	57.8	32,231	Soichi Fujii	SDP	40.2	LDP hold
Toyama 3rd	Tamisuke Watanuki	PNP	Keiichiro Tachibana	LDP	134,315	45.9	28,832	Yoshihiko Aimoto	Ind.	36.0	LDP gain from PNP
Ishikawa 1st	Hiroshi Hase	LDP	Ken Okuda	DPJ	125,667	49.2	9,488	Hiroshi Hase	LDP	45.8	DPJ gain from LDP
Ishikawa 2nd	Yoshirō Mori	LDP	Yoshirō Mori	LDP	123,490	50.2	4,469	Mieko Tanaka	DPJ	48.4	LDP hold
Ishikawa 3rd	Shigeo Kitamura	LDP	Kazuya Kondo	DPJ	100,832	49.9	2,233	Shigeo Kitamura	LDP	48.8	DPJ gain from LDP
Fukui 1st	Tomomi Inada	LDP	Tomomi Inada	LDP	78,969	50.0	6,850	Ryuzo Sasaki	DPJ	45.6	LDP hold
Fukui 2nd	Taku Yamamoto	LDP	Taku Yamamoto	LDP	80,033	49.7	1,537	Masaaki Itokawa	DPJ	48.8	LDP hold
Fukui 3rd	Tsuyoshi Takagi	LDP	Tsuyoshi Takagi	LDP	80,724	50.8	6,566	Isao Matsumiya	DPJ	46.7	LDP hold
Nagano 1st	Kenji Kosaka	LDP	Takashi Shinohara	DPJ	161,543	51.3	37,407	Kenji Kosaka	LDP	39.4	DPJ gain from LDP
Nagano 2nd	Mitsu Shimojo	DPJ	Mitsu Shimojo	DPJ	158,666	55.9	79,399	Shunsuke Mutai	LDP	27.9	DPJ hold
Nagano 3rd	Tsutomu Hata	DPJ	Tsutomu Hata	DPJ	138,614	47.5	32,040	Tadao Iwasaki	LDP	36.5	DPJ hold
Nagano 4th	Shigeyuki Goto	LDP	Koji Yazaki	DPJ	106,262	56.3	43,144	Shigeyuki Goto	LDP	33.4	DPJ gain from LDP
Nagano 5th	Ichiro Miyashita	LDP	Gaku Kato	DPJ	107,300	46.9	15,464	Ichiro Miyashita	LDP	40.2	DPJ gain from LDP

Proportional representation results
Party	Votes	Seats	Rank	Elected member	Constituency	Ratio
DPJ	2,007,770 (44.4%)	6	1	Masaaki Itokawa	Fukui 2nd	98.1%
DPJ	2,007,770 (44.4%)	6	1	Mieko Tanaka	Ishikawa 2nd	96.4%
DPJ	2,007,770 (44.4%)	6	1	Isao Matsumiya	Fukui 3rd	91.9%
DPJ	2,007,770 (44.4%)	6	1	Ryuzo Sasaki	Fukui 1st	91.3%
DPJ	2,007,770 (44.4%)	6	18	Tetsuo Kutsukake		
DPJ	2,007,770 (44.4%)	6	19	Seizō Wakaizumi		
LDP	1,333,082 (29.5%)	4	1	Tadayoshi Nagashima		
LDP	1,333,082 (29.5%)	4	2	Shigeo Kitamura	Ishikawa 3rd	97.8%
LDP	1,333,082 (29.5%)	4	2	Hiroshi Hase	Ishikawa 1st	93.2%
LDP	1,333,082 (29.5%)	4	2	Jinen Nagase	Toyama 1st	90.8%
Komei	333,084 (7.4%)	1	1	Yoshio Urushibara		

== Tokai block ==
2009 Japanese general election in Tokai
- 30 August 2009

All 54 seats to the House of Representatives
	Majority party	Minority party	Third party
Party	DPJ	LDP	Komei
Last election	18 seats	30 seats	3 seats
Constituency	29	3	0
PR seats	12	6	2
Total	41	9	2
Seat change	▲23	▼21	▼1
	Fourth party	Fifth party
Party	JCP	Ind.
Last election	1 seat	2 seats
Constituency	0	1
PR seats	1	–
Total	1	1
Seat change	0	▼1

Single-member constituency results in Tokai
Constituency	Previous member		Elected member		Votes	%	Margin	Runner-up		%	Status
Gifu 1st	Seiko Noda	LDP	Masanao Shibahashi	DPJ	111,987	50.0	12,487	Seiko Noda	LDP	44.5	DPJ gain from LDP
Gifu 2nd	Yasufumi Tanahashi	LDP	Yasufumi Tanahashi	LDP	118,198	54.2	22,448	Ben Hashimoto	DPJ	43.9	LDP hold
Gifu 3rd	Yoji Muto	LDP	Yasuhiro Sonoda	DPJ	165,017	57.4	48,664	Yoji Muto	LDP	40.4	DPJ gain from LDP
Gifu 4th	Kazuyoshi Kaneko	LDP	Kazuyoshi Kaneko	LDP	141,679	52.9	21,154	Masato Imai	DPJ	45.0	LDP hold
Gifu 5th	Keiji Furuya	LDP	Yoshinobu Achiha	DPJ	114,676	53.2	13,745	Keiji Furuya	LDP	46.8	DPJ gain from LDP
Shizuoka 1st	Yōko Kamikawa	LDP	Seishu Makino	DPJ	120,904	47.3	24,808	Yōko Kamikawa	LDP	37.6	DPJ gain from LDP
Shizuoka 2nd	Yoshitsugu Harada	LDP	Shogo Tsugawa	DPJ	165,151	58.4	52,262	Yoshitsugu Harada	LDP	39.9	DPJ gain from LDP
Shizuoka 3rd	Hakuo Yanagisawa	LDP	Nobuhiro Koyama	DPJ	154,035	57.4	44,915	Hakuo Yanagisawa	LDP	40.6	DPJ gain from LDP
Shizuoka 4th	Yoshio Mochizuki	LDP	Kenji Tamura	DPJ	123,719	54.6	23,367	Yoshio Mochizuki	LDP	44.3	DPJ gain from LDP
Shizuoka 5th	Goshi Hosono	DPJ	Goshi Hosono	DPJ	184,328	59.0	62,515	Toshitsugu Saito	LDP	39.0	DPJ hold
Shizuoka 6th	Shu Watanabe	DPJ	Shu Watanabe	DPJ	197,688	66.5	104,044	Masatoshi Kurata	LDP	31.5	DPJ hold
Shizuoka 7th	Satsuki Katayama	LDP	Minoru Kiuchi	Ind.	129,376	52.1	66,260	Takeshi Saiki	DPJ	25.4	Ind. gain from LDP
Shizuoka 8th	Ryū Shionoya	LDP	Susumu Saito	DPJ	123,547	48.9	8,870	Ryū Shionoya	LDP	45.4	DPJ gain from LDP
Aichi 1st	Vacant	DPJ	Yuko Sato	DPJ	122,348	54.4	43,657	Yōsuke Shinoda	LDP	35.0	DPJ hold
Aichi 2nd	Motohisa Furukawa	DPJ	Motohisa Furukawa	DPJ	162,237	66.6	104,012	Misako Miyahara	LDP	23.9	DPJ hold
Aichi 3rd	Shoichi Kondo	DPJ	Shoichi Kondo	DPJ	153,735	62.2	85,099	Tatsuharu Mawatari	LDP	27.8	DPJ hold
Aichi 4th	Yoshio Maki	DPJ	Yoshio Maki	DPJ	129,382	57.3	65,015	Makiko Fujino	LDP	28.5	DPJ hold
Aichi 5th	Takahide Kimura	LDP	Hirotaka Akamatsu	DPJ	158,235	62.0	69,271	Mutsumi Teranishi	LDP	34.9	DPJ gain from LDP
Aichi 6th	Hideki Niwa	LDP	Yoshihiro Ishida	DPJ	167,697	58.9	65,445	Hideki Niwa	LDP	35.9	DPJ gain from LDP
Aichi 7th	Junji Suzuki	LDP	Shiori Yamao	DPJ	182,028	61.1	73,245	Junji Suzuki	LDP	36.5	DPJ gain from LDP
Aichi 8th	Tadahiko Ito	LDP	Yutaka Banno	DPJ	172,839	60.2	63,257	Tadahiko Ito	LDP	38.1	DPJ gain from LDP
Aichi 9th	Toshiki Kaifu	LDP	Mitsunori Okamoto	DPJ	180,609	62.4	80,060	Toshiki Kaifu	LDP	34.7	DPJ gain from LDP
Aichi 10th	Tetsuma Esaki	LDP	Kazumi Sugimoto	DPJ	172,401	60.7	68,697	Tetsuma Esaki	LDP	36.5	DPJ gain from LDP
Aichi 11th	Shinichiro Furumoto	DPJ	Shinichiro Furumoto	DPJ	177,350	64.0	86,016	Masaki Doi	LDP	33.0	DPJ hold
Aichi 12th	Seiken Sugiura	LDP	Yasuhiro Nakane	DPJ	180,972	55.4	58,774	Seiken Sugiura	LDP	37.4	DPJ gain from LDP
Aichi 13th	Hideaki Ōmura	LDP	Kensuke Onishi	DPJ	154,779	53.8	25,784	Hideaki Ōmura	LDP	44.8	DPJ gain from LDP
Aichi 14th	Katsumasa Suzuki	DPJ	Katsumasa Suzuki	DPJ	117,085	60.7	46,521	Motoshi Sugita	LDP	36.6	DPJ hold
Aichi 15th	Akihiko Yamamoto	LDP	Kazuyoshi Morimoto	DPJ	127,059	52.9	32,256	Akihiko Yamamoto	LDP	39.5	DPJ gain from LDP
Mie 1st	Jirō Kawasaki	LDP	Hiroshi Nakai	DPJ	118,413	53.5	20,033	Jirō Kawasaki	LDP	44.5	DPJ gain from LDP
Mie 2nd	Masaharu Nakagawa	DPJ	Masaharu Nakagawa	DPJ	138,207	61.8	66,581	Eikei Suzuki	LDP	32.0	DPJ hold
Mie 3rd	Katsuya Okada	DPJ	Katsuya Okada	DPJ	173,931	72.2	110,938	Koichi Hirata	LDP	26.1	DPJ hold
Mie 4th	Norihisa Tamura	LDP	Tetsuo Morimoto	DPJ	87,824	50.4	3,241	Norihisa Tamura	LDP	48.5	DPJ gain from LDP
Mie 5th	Norio Mitsuya	LDP	Norio Mitsuya	LDP	105,188	49.9	2,811	Daisuke Fujita	DPJ	48.6	LDP hold

Proportional representation results
Party	Votes	Seats	Rank	Elected member	Constituency	Ratio
DPJ	3,864,328 (46.3%)	11 → 12	1	Daisuke Fujita	Mie 5th	97.3%
DPJ	3,864,328 (46.3%)	11 → 12	1	Masato Imai	Gifu 4th	85.1%
DPJ	3,864,328 (46.3%)	11 → 12	1	Ben Hashimoto	Gifu 2nd	81.0%
DPJ	3,864,328 (46.3%)	11 → 12	1	Takeshi Saiki	Shizuoka 7th	48.8%
DPJ	3,864,328 (46.3%)	11 → 12	34	Tamiko Kasahara		
DPJ	3,864,328 (46.3%)	11 → 12	35	Tadashi Kanamori		
DPJ	3,864,328 (46.3%)	11 → 12	36	Ryoji Yamada		
DPJ	3,864,328 (46.3%)	11 → 12	37	Tsunehiko Yoshida		
DPJ	3,864,328 (46.3%)	11 → 12	38	Nobuaki Miwa		
DPJ	3,864,328 (46.3%)	11 → 12	39	Masae Kobayashi		
DPJ	3,864,328 (46.3%)	11 → 12	40	Masahiro Oyama		
DPJ	3,864,328 (46.3%)	11 → 12	41	Kayoko Isogai		
LDP	2,182,422 (26.1%)	6	1	Norihisa Tamura	Mie 4th	96.3%
LDP	2,182,422 (26.1%)	6	1	Ryū Shionoya	Shizuoka 8th	92.8%
LDP	2,182,422 (26.1%)	6	1	Seiko Noda	Gifu 1st	88.8%
LDP	2,182,422 (26.1%)	6	1	Keiji Furuya	Gifu 5th	88.0%
LDP	2,182,422 (26.1%)	6	1	Hideaki Ōmura	Aichi 13th	83.3%
LDP	2,182,422 (26.1%)	6	1	Jirō Kawasaki	Mie 1st	83.1%
Komei	891,158 (10.7%)	2	1	Chikara Sakaguchi		
Komei	891,158 (10.7%)	2	2	Yoshinori Oguchi		
JCP	486,974 (5.8%)	1	1	Kensho Sasaki		
YP	404,411 (4.8%)	1 → 0 (Note: Forfeited one seat due to lack of eligible candidates. The sole candidate failed to surpass the required 10% of votes in their single-member constituency race.)				

== Kinki block ==
2009 Japanese general election in Kinki
- 30 August 2009

All 77 seats to the House of Representatives
	Majority party	Minority party	Third party
Party	DPJ	LDP	Komei
Last election	17 seats	45 seats	10 seats
Constituency	41	5	0
PR seats	11	9	5
Total	52	14	5
Seat change	▲35	▼31	▼5
	Fourth party	Fifth party	Sixth party
Party	JCP	SDP	NPN
Last election	3 seats	1 seat	1 seat
Constituency	0	1	1
PR seats	3	1	0
Total	3	2	1
Seat change	0	▲1	0

Single-member constituency results in Kinki
Constituency	Previous member		Elected member		Votes	%	Margin	Runner-up		%	Status
Shiga 1st	Kenichiro Ueno	LDP	Tatsuo Kawabata	DPJ	112,590	51.9	30,328	Kenichiro Ueno	LDP	37.9	DPJ gain from LDP
Shiga 2nd	Issei Tajima	DPJ	Issei Tajima	DPJ	109,885	61.0	42,926	Yuji Fujii	LDP	37.2	DPJ hold
Shiga 3rd	Taizō Mikazuki	DPJ	Taizō Mikazuki	DPJ	103,445	60.8	48,551	Osamu Uno	LDP	32.3	DPJ hold
Shiga 4th	Mineichi Iwanaga	LDP	Tenzo Okumura	DPJ	113,801	57.0	52,490	Takaya Mutō	LDP	30.7	DPJ gain from LDP
Kyoto 1st	Bunmei Ibuki	LDP	Tomoyuki Taira	DPJ	105,818	43.0	23,905	Bunmei Ibuki	LDP	33.3	DPJ gain from LDP
Kyoto 2nd	Seiji Maehara	DPJ	Seiji Maehara	DPJ	101,151	57.5	58,380	Tomohiro Yamamoto	LDP	24.3	DPJ hold
Kyoto 3rd	Kenta Izumi	DPJ	Kenta Izumi	DPJ	121,834	54.6	53,791	Koichiro Shimizu	LDP	30.5	DPJ hold
Kyoto 4th	Yasuhiro Nakagawa	LDP	Keiro Kitagami	DPJ	109,865	41.2	20,608	Hideo Tanaka	Ind.	33.5	DPJ gain from LDP
Kyoto 5th	Sadakazu Tanigaki	LDP	Sadakazu Tanigaki	LDP	87,998	46.5	7,032	Mai Ohara	DPJ	42.8	LDP hold
Kyoto 6th	Kazunori Yamanoi	DPJ	Kazunori Yamanoi	DPJ	176,022	57.4	84,078	Kyoko Izawa	LDP	30.0	DPJ hold
Osaka 1st	Kōki Chūma	LDP	Atsushi Kumada	DPJ	117,313	50.8	38,978	Kōki Chūma	LDP	33.9	DPJ gain from LDP
Osaka 2nd	Shika Kawajo	LDP	Hitoshi Hagihara	DPJ	91,952	40.1	19,064	Akira Sato	Ind.	31.8	DPJ gain from LDP
Osaka 3rd	Masahiro Tabata	Komei	Masazumi Nakajima	DPJ	109,518	44.7	12,397	Masahiro Tabata	Komei	39.6	DPJ gain from Komei
Osaka 4th	Yasuhide Nakayama	LDP	Osamu Yoshida	DPJ	135,411	50.8	36,835	Yasuhide Nakayama	LDP	37.0	DPJ gain from LDP
Osaka 5th	Takayoshi Taniguchi	Komei	Tetsuo Inami	DPJ	121,210	46.7	23,606	Takayoshi Taniguchi	Komei	37.6	DPJ gain from Komei
Osaka 6th	Yutaka Fukushima	Komei	Fumiyoshi Murakami	DPJ	109,143	43.3	1,807	Yutaka Fukushima	Komei	42.6	DPJ gain from Komei
Osaka 7th	Naomi Tokashiki	LDP	Osamu Fujimura	DPJ	124,982	52.9	45,693	Naomi Tokashiki	LDP	33.6	DPJ gain from LDP
Osaka 8th	Takashi Ōtsuka	LDP	Kansei Nakano	DPJ	114,851	53.3	37,446	Takashi Ōtsuka	LDP	35.9	DPJ gain from LDP
Osaka 9th	Kenji Harada	LDP	Nobumori Otani	DPJ	150,452	51.0	52,550	Kenji Harada	LDP	33.2	DPJ gain from LDP
Osaka 10th	Kenta Matsunami	LDP	Kiyomi Tsujimoto	SDP	109,693	50.5	24,587	Kenta Matsunami	LDP	39.2	SDP gain from LDP
Osaka 11th	Hirofumi Hirano	DPJ	Hirofumi Hirano	DPJ	156,002	59.5	85,693	Nobuko Iwaki	LDP	26.8	DPJ hold
Osaka 12th	Tomokatsu Kitagawa	LDP	Shinji Tarutoko	DPJ	119,048	53.2	38,201	Tomokatsu Kitagawa	LDP	36.1	DPJ gain from LDP
Osaka 13th	Akira Nishino	LDP	Akira Nishino	LDP	107,807	43.5	16,354	Junko Shiraishi	PNP	36.5	LDP hold
Osaka 14th	Takashi Tanihata	LDP	Takashi Nagao	DPJ	136,798	48.4	31,939	Takashi Tanihata	LDP	37.1	DPJ gain from LDP
Osaka 15th	Naokazu Takemoto	LDP	Kei Otani	DPJ	123,651	46.8	15,755	Naokazu Takemoto	LDP	40.8	DPJ gain from LDP
Osaka 16th	Kazuo Kitagawa	Komei	Hiroyuki Moriyama	DPJ	100,548	48.0	15,665	Kazuo Kitagawa	Komei	40.6	DPJ gain from Komei
Osaka 17th	Nobuko Okashita	LDP	Megumu Tsuji	DPJ	92,666	43.1	27,612	Nobuko Okashita	LDP	30.3	DPJ gain from LDP
Osaka 18th	Taro Nakayama	LDP	Osamu Nakagawa	DPJ	132,399	48.6	27,700	Taro Nakayama	LDP	38.4	DPJ gain from LDP
Osaka 19th	Takashi Nagayasu	DPJ	Takashi Nagayasu	DPJ	110,313	55.6	39,434	Kenshiro Matsunami	LDP	35.7	DPJ hold
Hyogo 1st	Masahito Moriyama	LDP	Masae Ido	DPJ	111,183	48.6	37,416	Masahito Moriyama	LDP	32.3	DPJ gain from LDP
Hyogo 2nd	Kazuyoshi Akaba	Komei	Koichi Mukoyama	DPJ	111,208	48.9	22,706	Kazuyoshi Akaba	Komei	38.9	DPJ gain from Komei
Hyogo 3rd	Yoshihiro Seki	LDP	Ryuichi Doi	DPJ	102,350	50.0	34,517	Yoshihiro Seki	LDP	33.1	DPJ gain from LDP
Hyogo 4th	Kiichi Inoue	LDP	Shoichi Takahashi	DPJ	142,684	51.6	39,348	Kiichi Inoue	LDP	37.3	DPJ gain from LDP
Hyogo 5th	Koichi Tani	LDP	Yasuhiro Kajiwara	DPJ	142,631	55.0	33,134	Koichi Tani	LDP	42.2	DPJ gain from LDP
Hyogo 6th	Tsukasa Kobiki	LDP	Koichiro Ichimura	DPJ	172,889	55.6	68,875	Tsukasa Kobiki	LDP	33.4	DPJ gain from LDP
Hyogo 7th	Shigeo Omae	LDP	Toshiro Ishii	DPJ	176,017	58.6	85,356	Shigeo Omae	LDP	30.2	DPJ gain from LDP
Hyogo 8th	Tetsuzo Fuyushiba	Komei	Yasuo Tanaka	NPN	106,225	42.2	2,307	Tetsuzo Fuyushiba	Komei	41.3	NPN gain from Komei
Hyogo 9th	Yasutoshi Nishimura	LDP	Yasutoshi Nishimura	LDP	137,190	60.6	60,199	Ichizo Miyamoto	PNP	34.0	LDP hold
Hyogo 10th	Kisaburo Tokai	LDP	Yasuhiro Okada	DPJ	132,231	58.0	40,199	Kisaburo Tokai	LDP	40.4	DPJ gain from LDP
Hyogo 11th	Tōru Toida	LDP	Takeaki Matsumoto	DPJ	146,058	61.3	59,855	Tōru Toida	LDP	36.2	DPJ gain from LDP
Hyogo 12th	Saburo Komoto	LDP	Tsuyoshi Yamaguchi	DPJ	123,325	55.9	29,293	Saburo Komoto	LDP	42.6	DPJ gain from LDP
Nara 1st	Sumio Mabuchi	DPJ	Sumio Mabuchi	DPJ	120,812	60.7	59,348	Masahiro Morioka	LDP	30.9	DPJ hold
Nara 2nd	Sanae Takaichi	LDP	Makoto Taki	DPJ	98,728	46.5	3,849	Sanae Takaichi	LDP	44.7	DPJ gain from LDP
Nara 3rd	Shinsuke Okuno	LDP	Masashige Yoshikawa	DPJ	111,949	54.7	36,349	Shinsuke Okuno	LDP	37.0	DPJ gain from LDP
Nara 4th	Ryotaro Tanose	LDP	Ryotaro Tanose	LDP	95,638	49.7	1,835	Takanori Onishi	DPJ	48.7	LDP hold
Wakayama 1st	Tatsuya Tanimoto	LDP	Shūhei Kishimoto	DPJ	120,309	58.1	48,200	Tatsuya Tanimoto	LDP	34.9	DPJ gain from LDP
Wakayama 2nd	Masatoshi Ishida	LDP	Naoto Sakaguchi	DPJ	90,134	54.8	18,791	Masatoshi Ishida	LDP	43.4	DPJ gain from LDP
Wakayama 3rd	Toshihiro Nikai	LDP	Toshihiro Nikai	LDP	117,237	52.1	14,895	Kimiyoshi Tamaki	DPJ	45.4	LDP hold

Proportional representation results
Party	Votes	Seats	Rank	Elected member	Constituency	Ratio
DPJ	4,733,415 (42.4%)	13 → 11 (Note: Forfeited two seats due to lack of candidates.)	1	Takanori Onishi	Nara 4th	98.1%
DPJ	4,733,415 (42.4%)	13 → 11	1	Mai Ohara	Kyoto 5th	92.0%
DPJ	4,733,415 (42.4%)	13 → 11	1	Kimiyoshi Tamaki	Wakayama 3rd	87.3%
DPJ	4,733,415 (42.4%)	13 → 11	45	Hideko Muroi		
DPJ	4,733,415 (42.4%)	13 → 11	46	Sadatoshi Kumagai		
DPJ	4,733,415 (42.4%)	13 → 11	47	Hiroshi Hamamoto		
DPJ	4,733,415 (42.4%)	13 → 11	48	Yoshihiko Watanabe		
DPJ	4,733,415 (42.4%)	13 → 11	49	Mitsue Kawakami		
DPJ	4,733,415 (42.4%)	13 → 11	50	Hirotaka Matsuoka		
DPJ	4,733,415 (42.4%)	13 → 11	51	Juntaro Toyoda		
DPJ	4,733,415 (42.4%)	13 → 11	52	Toshikazu Higuchi		
LDP	2,592,451 (23.2%)	7 → 9	1	Mitsue Kondo		
LDP	2,592,451 (23.2%)	7 → 9	2	Takuji Yanagimoto		
LDP	2,592,451 (23.2%)	7 → 9	3	Sanae Takaichi	Nara 2nd	96.1%
LDP	2,592,451 (23.2%)	7 → 9	3	Naokazu Takemoto	Osaka 15th	87.3%
LDP	2,592,451 (23.2%)	7 → 9	3	Masatoshi Ishida	Wakayama 2nd	79.2%
LDP	2,592,451 (23.2%)	7 → 9	3	Kenta Matsunami	Osaka 10th	77.6%
LDP	2,592,451 (23.2%)	7 → 9	3	Bunmei Ibuki	Kyoto 1st	77.4%
LDP	2,592,451 (23.2%)	7 → 9	3	Koichi Tani	Hyogo 5th	76.8%
LDP	2,592,451 (23.2%)	7 → 9	3	Takashi Tanihata	Osaka 14th	76.7%
Komei	1,449,170 (13.0%)	4 → 5	1	Yasuko Ikenobō		
Komei	1,449,170 (13.0%)	4 → 5	2	Hiroyoshi Nishi		
Komei	1,449,170 (13.0%)	4 → 5	3	Shigeki Sato		
Komei	1,449,170 (13.0%)	4 → 5	4	Yuzuru Takeuchi		
Komei	1,449,170 (13.0%)	4 → 5	5	Masao Akamatsu		
JCP	1,067,443 (9.6%)	3	1	Keiji Kokuta	Kyoto 1st	51.6%
JCP	1,067,443 (9.6%)	3	2	Hidekatsu Yoshii	Osaka 13th	42.4%
JCP	1,067,443 (9.6%)	3	3	Takeshi Miyamoto		
YP	465,591 (4.2%)	1 → 0 (Note: Forfeited one seat due to lack of eligible candidates. The sole candidate failed to surpass the required 10% of votes in their single-member constituency race.)				
SDP	411,092 (3.7%)	1	4	Ryoichi Hattori		

== Chugoku block ==
2009 Japanese general election in Chugoku
- 30 August 2009

All 31 seats to the House of Representatives
	Majority party	Minority party	Third party
Party	DPJ	LDP	Komei
Last election	5 seats	21 seats	2 seats
Constituency	8	10	0
PR seats	6	4	1
Total	14	14	1
Seat change	▲9	▼7	▼1
	Fourth party		Sixth party
Party	PNP		Ind.
Last election	2 seats		1 seat
Constituency	1		1
PR seats	0		–
Total	1		1
Seat change	▼1		0

Single-member constituency results in Chugoku
Constituency	Previous member		Elected member		Votes	%	Margin	Runner-up		%	Status
Tottori 1st	Shigeru Ishiba	LDP	Shigeru Ishiba	LDP	118,121	62.0	54,738	Yasuaki Okuda	DPJ	33.3	LDP hold
Tottori 2nd	Ryosei Akazawa	LDP	Ryosei Akazawa	LDP	84,659	49.6	626	Shunji Yuhara	DPJ	49.2	LDP hold
Shimane 1st	Hiroyuki Hosoda	LDP	Hiroyuki Hosoda	LDP	122,595	57.2	41,806	Hisaaki Komuro	DPJ	37.7	LDP hold
Shimane 2nd	Wataru Takeshita	LDP	Wataru Takeshita	LDP	135,296	54.9	27,104	Hisaoki Kamei	PNP	43.9	LDP hold
Okayama 1st	Ichiro Aisawa	LDP	Ichiro Aisawa	LDP	110,345	48.3	4,076	Takashi Takai	DPJ	46.5	LDP hold
Okayama 2nd	Keisuke Tsumura	DPJ	Keisuke Tsumura	DPJ	102,525	52.9	38,176	Seiji Hagiwara	LDP	33.2	DPJ hold
Okayama 3rd	Takeo Hiranuma	Ind.	Takeo Hiranuma	Ind.	95,871	46.6	41,276	Keito Nishimura	DPJ	26.5	Ind. hold
Okayama 4th	Michiyoshi Yunoki	DPJ	Michiyoshi Yunoki	DPJ	134,319	57.0	37,035	Gaku Hashimoto	LDP	41.3	DPJ hold
Okayama 5th	Yoshitaka Murata	LDP	Katsunobu Katō	LDP	105,172	53.1	15,277	Hiroki Hanasaki	DPJ	45.4	LDP hold
Hiroshima 1st	Fumio Kishida	LDP	Fumio Kishida	LDP	95,475	47.3	7,918	Hiroshi Sugekawa	DPJ	43.4	LDP hold
Hiroshima 2nd	Hiroshi Hiraguchi	LDP	Daisuke Matsumoto	DPJ	149,227	56.3	38,989	Hiroshi Hiraguchi	LDP	41.6	DPJ gain from LDP
Hiroshima 3rd	Katsuyuki Kawai	LDP	Hiroaki Hashimoto	DPJ	133,994	56.8	37,929	Yoshitake Masuhara	LDP	40.7	DPJ gain from LDP
Hiroshima 4th	Hidenao Nakagawa	LDP	Seiki Soramoto	DPJ	102,435	50.3	5,139	Hidenao Nakagawa	LDP	47.8	DPJ gain from LDP
Hiroshima 5th	Minoru Terada	LDP	Mitsuo Mitani	DPJ	99,770	50.9	6,176	Minoru Terada	LDP	47.7	DPJ gain from LDP
Hiroshima 6th	Shizuka Kamei	PNP	Shizuka Kamei	PNP	137,287	60.2	67,479	Toshifumi Kojima	LDP	30.6	PNP hold
Hiroshima 7th	Yoichi Miyazawa	LDP	Takashi Wada	DPJ	133,871	53.7	22,550	Yoichi Miyazawa	LDP	44.7	DPJ gain from LDP
Yamaguchi 1st	Masahiko Kōmura	LDP	Masahiko Kōmura	LDP	142,103	57.0	47,850	Tsutomu Takamura	DPJ	37.8	LDP hold
Yamaguchi 2nd	Hideo Hiraoka	DPJ	Hideo Hiraoka	DPJ	117,571	51.7	11,631	Shigetaro Yamamoto	LDP	46.5	DPJ hold
Yamaguchi 3rd	Takeo Kawamura	LDP	Takeo Kawamura	LDP	115,757	60.1	41,997	Noboru Miura	DPJ	38.3	LDP hold
Yamaguchi 4th	Shinzo Abe	LDP	Shinzo Abe	LDP	121,365	64.3	62,570	Takako Tokura	DPJ	31.1	LDP hold

Proportional representation results
Party	Votes	Seats	Rank	Elected member	Constituency	Ratio
DPJ	1,704,242 (39.7%)	6	1	Shunji Yuhara	Tottori 2nd	99.3%
DPJ	1,704,242 (39.7%)	6	1	Takashi Takai	Okayama 1st	96.3%
DPJ	1,704,242 (39.7%)	6	1	Hiroshi Sugekawa	Hiroshima 1st	91.7%
DPJ	1,704,242 (39.7%)	6	1	Hiroki Hanasaki	Okayama 5th	85.5%
DPJ	1,704,242 (39.7%)	6	1	Tsutomu Takamura	Yamaguchi 1st	66.3%
DPJ	1,704,242 (39.7%)	6	1	Hisaaki Komuro	Shimane 1st	65.9%
LDP	1,388,451 (32.4%)	4	1	Toshiko Abe	Okayama 3rd	54.9%
LDP	1,388,451 (32.4%)	4	2	Yoshitaka Murata		
LDP	1,388,451 (32.4%)	4	3	Katsuyuki Kawai		
LDP	1,388,451 (32.4%)	4	4	Hidenao Nakagawa	Hiroshima 4th	95.0%
Komei	555,552 (13.0%)	1	1	Tetsuo Saito		

== Shikoku block ==
2009 Japanese general election in Shikoku
- 30 August 2009

All 19 seats to the House of Representatives
	Majority party	Minority party
Party	LDP	DPJ
Last election	14 seats	3 seats
Constituency	8	5
PR seats	2	3
Total	10	8
Seat change	▼4	▲5
	Third party	Fourth party
Party	Komei	Ind.
Last election	1 seat	1 seat
Constituency	0	0
PR seats	1	–
Total	1	0
Seat change	0	▼1

Single-member constituency results in Shikoku
Constituency	Previous member		Elected member		Votes	%	Margin	Runner-up		%	Status
Tokushima 1st	Yoshito Sengoku	DPJ	Yoshito Sengoku	DPJ	76,764	56.2	36,984	Yoshiro Okamoto	LDP	29.1	DPJ hold
Tokushima 2nd	Shunichi Yamaguchi	LDP	Miho Takai	DPJ	85,290	54.7	16,860	Shunichi Yamaguchi	LDP	43.9	DPJ gain from LDP
Tokushima 3rd	Masazumi Gotoda	LDP	Masazumi Gotoda	LDP	81,581	49.8	1,222	Hirobumi Niki	DPJ	49.0	LDP hold
Kagawa 1st	Takuya Hirai	LDP	Junya Ogawa	DPJ	109,618	52.2	18,215	Takuya Hirai	LDP	43.6	DPJ gain from LDP
Kagawa 2nd	Yoshio Kimura	LDP	Yuichiro Tamaki	DPJ	109,863	57.2	30,400	Yoshio Kimura	LDP	41.3	DPJ gain from LDP
Kagawa 3rd	Yoshinori Ohno	LDP	Yoshinori Ohno	LDP	73,379	43.3	19,557	Haruhiko Maida	SDP	31.8	LDP hold
Ehime 1st	Yasuhisa Shiozaki	LDP	Yasuhisa Shiozaki	LDP	130,330	48.6	2,768	Takako Nagae	DPJ	47.6	LDP hold
Ehime 2nd	Seiichiro Murakami	LDP	Seiichiro Murakami	LDP	94,843	48.0	9,544	Tomoko Okahira	SDP	43.2	LDP hold
Ehime 3rd	Shinya Ono	LDP	Yoichi Shiraishi	DPJ	103,431	55.5	23,507	Toru Shiraishi	LDP	42.9	DPJ gain from LDP
Ehime 4th	Koichi Yamamoto	LDP	Koichi Yamamoto	LDP	73,085	39.5	7,507	Hideyuki Takahashi	DPJ	35.5	LDP hold
Kochi 1st	Teru Fukui	LDP	Teru Fukui	LDP	44,068	32.5	4,742	Daijiro Hashimoto	Ind.	29.0	LDP hold
Kochi 2nd	Gen Nakatani	LDP	Gen Nakatani	LDP	75,554	53.4	25,712	Kiyo Kusumoto	DPJ	35.2	LDP hold
Kochi 3rd	Yūji Yamamoto	LDP	Yūji Yamamoto	LDP	74,489	49.4	7,912	Tomoi Nakayama	DPJ	43.0	LDP hold

Proportional representation results
Party	Votes	Seats	Rank	Elected member	Constituency	Ratio
DPJ	973,038 (43.2%)	3	1	Hirobumi Niki	Tokushima 3rd	98.5%
DPJ	973,038 (43.2%)	3	1	Takako Nagae	Ehime 1st	97.9%
DPJ	973,038 (43.2%)	3	1	Hideyuki Takahashi	Ehime 4th	89.7%
LDP	719,594 (32.0%)	2	1	Takuya Hirai	Kagawa 1st	83.4%
LDP	719,594 (32.0%)	2	1	Shunichi Yamaguchi	Tokushima 2nd	80.2%
Komei	293,204 (13.0%)	1	1	Noritoshi Ishida		

== Kyushu block ==
2009 Japanese general election in Kyushu
- 30 August 2009

All 59 seats to the House of Representatives
	Majority party	Minority party	Third party
Party	DPJ	LDP	Komei
Last election	11 seats	34 seats	3 seats
Constituency	20	13	0
PR seats	9	7	3
Total	29	20	3
Seat change	▲18	▼14	0
	Fourth party	Fifth party	Sixth party
Party	SDP	PNP	Ind.
Last election	2 seats	0 seats	8 seats
Constituency	2	2	1
PR seats	1	0	–
Total	3	2	1
Seat change	▲1	▲2	▼7

Single-member constituency results in Kyushu
Constituency	Previous member		Elected member		Votes	%	Margin	Runner-up		%	Status
Fukuoka 1st	Ryu Matsumoto	DPJ	Ryu Matsumoto	DPJ	123,441	52.8	34,793	Nobuhiko Endō	LDP	37.9	DPJ hold
Fukuoka 2nd	Taku Yamasaki	LDP	Shuji Inatomi	DPJ	156,431	56.0	53,161	Taku Yamasaki	LDP	36.9	DPJ gain from LDP
Fukuoka 3rd	Seiichi Ota	LDP	Kazue Fujita	DPJ	142,489	52.8	34,253	Seiichi Ota	LDP	40.1	DPJ gain from LDP
Fukuoka 4th	Tomoyoshi Watanabe	LDP	Takaaki Koga	DPJ	119,500	51.7	13,376	Tomoyoshi Watanabe	LDP	45.9	DPJ gain from LDP
Fukuoka 5th	Yoshiaki Harada	LDP	Daizo Kusuda	DPJ	148,502	53.1	22,735	Yoshiaki Harada	LDP	45.0	DPJ gain from LDP
Fukuoka 6th	Kunio Hatoyama	LDP	Kunio Hatoyama	LDP	138,327	52.7	18,846	Issei Koga	DPJ	45.6	LDP hold
Fukuoka 7th	Makoto Koga	LDP	Makoto Koga	LDP	128,137	55.0	23,409	Kuniyoshi Noda	DPJ	45.0	LDP hold
Fukuoka 8th	Tarō Asō	LDP	Tarō Asō	LDP	165,327	62.2	69,000	Gōsei Yamamoto	DPJ	36.2	LDP hold
Fukuoka 9th	Asahiko Mihara	LDP	Rintaro Ogata	DPJ	122,815	47.6	13,008	Asahiko Mihara	LDP	42.6	DPJ gain from LDP
Fukuoka 10th	Kyoko Nishikawa	LDP	Takashi Kii	DPJ	123,312	48.1	16,947	Kyoko Nishikawa	LDP	41.5	DPJ gain from LDP
Fukuoka 11th	Ryota Takeda	LDP	Ryota Takeda	LDP	106,334	57.4	45,142	Haruna Yamaguchi	SDP	33.1	LDP hold
Saga 1st	Takamaro Fukuoka	LDP	Kazuhiro Haraguchi	DPJ	96,618	55.6	21,143	Takamaro Fukuoka	LDP	43.5	DPJ gain from LDP
Saga 2nd	Masahiro Imamura	LDP	Hiroshi Ogushi	DPJ	86,098	51.4	6,855	Masahiro Imamura	LDP	47.3	DPJ gain from LDP
Saga 3rd	Kosuke Hori	LDP	Kosuke Hori	LDP	93,681	58.2	63,335	Eiji Yanase	SDP	18.9	LDP hold
Nagasaki 1st	Yoshiaki Takaki	DPJ	Yoshiaki Takaki	DPJ	129,044	55.3	41,747	Tsutomu Tomioka	LDP	37.4	DPJ hold
Nagasaki 2nd	Fumio Kyūma	LDP	Eriko Fukuda	DPJ	120,672	50.4	14,466	Fumio Kyūma	LDP	44.3	DPJ gain from LDP
Nagasaki 3rd	Yaichi Tanigawa	LDP	Masahiko Yamada	DPJ	79,223	49.6	1,907	Yaichi Tanigawa	LDP	48.4	DPJ gain from LDP
Nagasaki 4th	Seigo Kitamura	LDP	Daisuke Miyajima	DPJ	97,912	50.3	4,484	Seigo Kitamura	LDP	48.0	DPJ gain from LDP
Kumamoto 1st	Yorihisa Matsuno	DPJ	Yorihisa Matsuno	DPJ	137,048	55.4	39,463	Minoru Kihara	LDP	39.5	DPJ hold
Kumamoto 2nd	Takeshi Noda	LDP	Kenichiro Fukushima	DPJ	104,876	50.4	4,943	Takeshi Hayashida	LDP	48.0	DPJ gain from LDP
Kumamoto 3rd	Tetsushi Sakamoto	LDP	Tetsushi Sakamoto	LDP	81,506	40.6	6,621	Hidetomo Goto	DPJ	37.3	LDP hold
Kumamoto 4th	Hiroyuki Sonoda	LDP	Hiroyuki Sonoda	LDP	123,900	59.2	45,089	Shinichi Matsunaga	PNP	37.6	LDP hold
Kumamoto 5th	Yasushi Kaneko	LDP	Yasushi Kaneko	LDP	98,632	55.1	22,506	Takatoshi Nakashima	SDP	42.5	LDP hold
Oita 1st	Shuji Kira	DPJ	Shuji Kira	DPJ	141,665	58.9	60,810	Yoichi Anami	LDP	33.6	DPJ hold
Oita 2nd	Seishirō Etō	LDP	Yasumasa Shigeno	SDP	112,090	50.1	4,966	Seishirō Etō	LDP	47.9	SDP gain from LDP
Oita 3rd	Takeshi Iwaya	LDP	Katsuhiko Yokomitsu	DPJ	121,031	51.0	8,429	Takeshi Iwaya	LDP	47.5	DPJ gain from LDP
Miyazaki 1st	Nariaki Nakayama	Ind.	Hidesaburo Kawamura	Ind.	109,411	48.3	54,297	Nariaki Nakayama	Ind.	24.3	Ind. gain from Ind.
Miyazaki 2nd	Taku Etō	LDP	Taku Etō	LDP	120,567	56.9	38,570	Seiichirō Dōkyū	DPJ	38.7	LDP hold
Miyazaki 3rd	Yoshihisa Furukawa	LDP	Yoshihisa Furukawa	LDP	131,908	67.4	73,565	Hidetoshi Matsumura	SDP	29.8	LDP hold
Kagoshima 1st	Okiharu Yasuoka	LDP	Hiroshi Kawauchi	DPJ	117,383	53.2	23,157	Okiharu Yasuoka	LDP	42.7	DPJ gain from LDP
Kagoshima 2nd	Takeshi Tokuda	LDP	Takeshi Tokuda	LDP	114,102	55.7	25,540	Akashi Uchikoshi	DPJ	43.2	LDP hold
Kagoshima 3rd	Kazuaki Miyaji	LDP	Tadahiro Matsushita	PNP	107,285	56.5	28,409	Kazuaki Miyaji	LDP	41.6	PNP gain from LDP
Kagoshima 4th	Yasuhiro Ozato	LDP	Yasuhiro Ozato	LDP	97,054	50.1	2,711	Inao Minayoshi	DPJ	48.7	LDP hold
Kagoshima 5th	Hiroshi Moriyama	LDP	Hiroshi Moriyama	LDP	109,426	61.1	42,023	Shinsuke Amiya	DPJ	37.6	LDP hold
Okinawa 1st	Mikio Shimoji	PNP	Mikio Shimoji	PNP	77,152	46.5	14,135	Konosuke Kokuba	LDP	38.0	PNP hold
Okinawa 2nd	Kantoku Teruya	SDP	Kantoku Teruya	SDP	101,820	61.1	41,047	Osamu Ashitomi	LDP	36.5	SDP hold
Okinawa 3rd	Chiken Kakazu	LDP	Denny Tamaki	DPJ	89,266	48.7	45,753	Chiken Kakazu	LDP	23.7	DPJ gain from LDP
Okinawa 4th	Kosaburo Nishime	LDP	Chobin Zukeran	DPJ	89,680	54.7	18,027	Kosaburo Nishime	LDP	43.7	DPJ gain from LDP

Proportional representation results
Party	Votes	Seats	Rank	Elected member	Constituency	Ratio
DPJ	3,073,035 (38.1%)	9	1	Inao Minayoshi	Kagoshima 4th	97.2%
DPJ	3,073,035 (38.1%)	9	1	Hidetomo Goto	Kumamoto 3rd	91.9%
DPJ	3,073,035 (38.1%)	9	1	Issei Koga	Fukuoka 6th	86.4%
DPJ	3,073,035 (38.1%)	9	1	Kuniyoshi Noda	Fukuoka 7th	81.7%
DPJ	3,073,035 (38.1%)	9	1	Akashi Uchikoshi	Kagoshima 2nd	77.6%
DPJ	3,073,035 (38.1%)	9	1	Seiichirō Dōkyū	Miyazaki 2nd	68.0%
DPJ	3,073,035 (38.1%)	9	1	Shinsuke Amiya	Kagoshima 5th	61.6%
DPJ	3,073,035 (38.1%)	9	1	Gōsei Yamamoto	Fukuoka 8th	58.3%
DPJ	3,073,035 (38.1%)	9	29	Takahiro Kawagoe		
LDP	2,352,372 (29.2%)	7	1	Takeshi Noda		
LDP	2,352,372 (29.2%)	7	2	Kozo Yamamoto		
LDP	2,352,372 (29.2%)	7	3	Yaichi Tanigawa	Nagasaki 3rd	97.6%
LDP	2,352,372 (29.2%)	7	3	Seishirō Etō	Oita 2nd	95.6%
LDP	2,352,372 (29.2%)	7	3	Seigo Kitamura	Nagasaki 4th	95.4%
LDP	2,352,372 (29.2%)	7	3	Takeshi Iwaya	Oita 3rd	93.0%
LDP	2,352,372 (29.2%)	7	3	Masahiro Imamura	Saga 2nd	92.0%
Komei	1,225,505 (15.2%)	3	1	Takenori Kanzaki		
Komei	1,225,505 (15.2%)	3	2	Junji Higashi		
Komei	1,225,505 (15.2%)	3	3	Yasuyuki Eda		
SDP	480,257 (6.0%)	1	1	Takatoshi Nakashima	Kumamoto 5th	77.2%
JCP	425,276 (5.3%)	1	1	Seiken Akamine		

== Leaders' races ==
Results for party leaders
Party	Member	Constituency	Votes	%	Position	Status
DPJ	Yukio Hatoyama	Hokkaido 9th	201,461	66.4	1st	Re-elected
LDP	Tarō Asō	Fukuoka 8th	165,327	62.2	1st	Re-elected
Komei	Akihiro Ota	Tokyo 12th	108,679	41.4	2nd	Defeated
JCP	Kazuo Shii	Southern Kanto PR	601,299	7.0	1st	Re-elected
SDP	Mizuho Fukushima	House of Councillors				
YP	Yoshimi Watanabe	Tochigi 3rd	142,482	95.3	1st	Re-elected
PNP	Tamisuke Watanuki	Hokuriku-Shin'etsu PR	240,333	5.3	1st	Defeated
NPN	Yasuo Tanaka	Hyogo 8th	106,225	42.2	1st	Elected
Daichi	Muneo Suzuki	Hokkaido PR	433,122	13.0	1st	Re-elected

== Closest races ==
Candidates with a narrow loss ratio of over 90%
Constituency	Candidate		Votes	%	Ratio
Aomori 3rd	Masayo Tanabu	DPJ	89,809	49.3	99.6
Kanagawa 2nd	Kazuya Mimura	DPJ	131,722	46.3	99.6
Tottori 2nd	Shunji Yuhara	DPJ	84,033	49.2	99.3
Hokkaido 7th	Hiroko Nakano	DPJ	99,236	49.2	99.1
Yamagata 1st	Toshiaki Endo	LDP	104,911	45.7	98.8
Akita 2nd	Katsutoshi Kaneda	LDP	92,600	42.0	98.6
Kanagawa 13th	Akira Amari	LDP	136,164	45.5	98.6
Osaka 6th	Yutaka Fukushima	Komei	107,336	42.6	98.3
Fukui 2nd	Masaaki Itokawa	DPJ	78,496	48.8	98.1
Nara 4th	Takanori Onishi	DPJ	93,803	48.7	98.1
Tokushima 3rd	Hirobumi Niki	DPJ	80,359	49.0	98.5
Ehime 1st	Takako Nagae	DPJ	127,562	47.6	97.9
Ishikawa 3rd	Shigeo Kitamura	LDP	98,599	48.8	97.8
Hyogo 8th	Tetsuzo Fuyushiba	Komei	103,918	41.3	97.8
Ibaraki 2nd	Fukushiro Nukaga	LDP	111,674	47.9	97.6
Nagasaki 3rd	Yaichi Tanigawa	LDP	77,316	48.4	97.6
Tokyo 13th	Ichirō Kamoshita	LDP	111,590	43.7	97.3
Mie 5th	Daisuke Fujita	DPJ	102,377	48.6	97.3
Kagoshima 4th	Inao Minayoshi	DPJ	94,343	48.7	97.2
Tokyo 11th	Yoshifu Arita	NPN	113,998	41.1	97.0
Chiba 11th	Kenichi Kaneko	DPJ	112,707	47.9	96.4
Ishikawa 2nd	Mieko Tanaka	DPJ	119,021	48.4	96.4
Mie 4th	Norihisa Tamura	LDP	84,583	48.5	96.3
Okayama 1st	Takashi Takai	DPJ	106,269	46.5	96.3
Nara 2nd	Sanae Takaichi	LDP	94,879	44.7	96.1
Oita 2nd	Seishirō Etō	LDP	107,124	47.9	95.6
Nagasaki 4th	Seigo Kitamura	LDP	93,428	48.0	95.4
Kumamoto 2nd	Takeshi Hayashida	LDP	99,933	48.0	95.3
Hiroshima 4th	Hidenao Nakagawa	LDP	97,296	47.8	95.0
Hiroshima 5th	Minoru Terada	LDP	93,594	47.7	93.8
Tokyo 4th	Masaaki Taira	LDP	93,583	35.1	93.5
Ibaraki 4th	Mamoru Takano	DPJ	97,256	47.3	93.3
Ishikawa 1st	Hiroshi Hase	LDP	117,168	45.8	93.2
Oita 3rd	Takeshi Iwaya	LDP	112,602	47.5	93.0
Shizuoka 8th	Ryū Shionoya	LDP	114,677	45.4	92.8
Kyoto 5th	Mai Ohara	DPJ	80,966	42.8	92.0
Saga 2nd	Masahiro Imamura	LDP	79,243	47.3	92.0
Fukui 3rd	Isao Matsumiya	DPJ	74,158	46.7	91.9
Kumamoto 3rd	Hidetomo Goto	DPJ	74,885	37.3	91.9
Tokyo 1st	Kaoru Yosano	LDP	130,030	43.5	91.7
Tokyo 10th	Yuriko Koike	LDP	96,739	43.3	91.7
Hiroshima 1st	Hiroshi Sugekawa	DPJ	87,557	43.4	91.7
Tokyo 12th	Akihiro Ota	Komei	108,679	41.4	91.5
Tochigi 5th	Yoshitada Tomioka	DPJ	92,592	47.2	91.3
Fukui 1st	Ryuzo Sasaki	DPJ	72,119	45.6	91.3
Chiba 10th	Motoo Hayashi	LDP	107,745	47.0	90.9
Toyama 1st	Jinen Nagase	LDP	82,040	45.3	90.8
Yamaguchi 2nd	Shigetaro Yamamoto	LDP	105,940	46.5	90.1
