= Akira Satō =

Akira Satō may refer to:

- Akira Satō (photographer) (佐藤 明, 1930–2002), Japanese photographer
- Akira Satō (ski jumper) (佐藤 晃, born 1964), Japanese ski jumper
- Akira Satō (politician) (born 1951), Japanese politician
- Akira Satou, a character in the visual novel Katawa Shoujo
