= Hiroko Nakano =

Japanese politician (born 1959)

- 仲野 博子
- Official portrait, 2011

Member of the House of Representatives
- In office 9 November 2003 – 16 November 2012
- Constituency: Hokkaido PR (2003–2005); Hokkaido 7th (2005–2009); Hokkaido PR (2009–2012)

Member of the Nemuro City Council
- In office 1989–2000

Personal details
- Born: 3 March 1959 (age 67) Yokohama, Aomori, Japan
- Party: Democratic
- Other political affiliations: Socialist (before 1996)
- Education: Hirosaki Gakuin University

Hiroko Nakano (仲野 博子, Nakano Hiroko; born 3 March 1959) is a former Japanese politician who served in the House of Representatives in the Diet (national legislature) as a member of the Democratic Party of Japan.

== Early life ==
Nakano is a native of Mutsu, Aomori and a graduate of Hirosaki Gakuin University.

== Political career ==
Nakano ran for the Diet for the first time in 2000 after serving three terms in the city assembly of Nemuro, Hokkaido since 1989. In her second attempt, she won a seat in the House of Representatives in the 2003 general election.

In the 2009 general election, Nakano was the only Democratic incumbent countrywide to lose her district seat to a Liberal Democrat. As the only losing Democratic district candidate in Hokkaidō though, she was safely reelected via the proportional representation block. She lost her seat in 2012.

House of Representatives (Japan)
Preceded by N/A	Representative for the Hokkaidō PR block 2003–2005; 2009–present	Incumbent
Preceded by Naoto Kitamura	Representative for Hokkaidō 7th district (single-member); 2005–2009	Succeeded by Yoshitaka Itō
