= Tokyo 17th district =

Japan House of Representatives constituency

Tokyo 17th District
- Parliamentary constituency for the Japanese House of Representatives
- Numbered map of inner Tokyo single-member districts
- Prefecture: Tokyo
- Proportional District: Tokyo
- Electorate: 383,490 (2026)

Current constituency
- Created: 1994
- Seats: One
- Party: LDP
- Representative: Katsuei Hirasawa
- Created from: Tokyo 10th district
- Wards: Katsushika

Tokyo 17th district is a constituency of the House of Representatives in the Diet of Japan (national legislature). It is located in northeastern parts of the former city of Tokyo and covers the ward of Katsushika. Before redistricting in 2022 it also included parts of Edogawa ward. As of 2012, 440,965 eligible voters were registered in the district.

Before the electoral reform of 1994, Katsushika, Edogawa and Adachi had been part of Tokyo 10th district where five Representatives were elected by single non-transferable vote.

The only representative for the 17th district since its creation has been Katsuei Hirasawa (LDP, Yamasaki faction), former Vice Minister in the Cabinet Office and former Chairman of the House of Representatives Committee on Foreign Affairs. In the 2024 Japanese general election Hirasawa was not endorsed by the LDP because of involvement in the 2023–2024 Japanese slush fund scandal and ran as an independent candidate.

== List of representatives ==
Representative	Party	Dates	Notes
Katsuei Hirasawa	LDP	1996–	Incumbent

== Election results ==
2026
Party	Candidate	Votes	%	±%
LDP	Katsuei Hirasawa	73,234	36.2	▲1.4
Centrist Reform	Mari Sorita	44,594	22.0	
DPP	Takako Hasegawa	28,282	14.0	▼14.1
Ishin	Sachiko Inokuchi	27,630	13.6	▼9.2
Sanseitō	Shinichirō Sugiura	19,291	9.5	
Independent	Yoriko Madoka	7,328	3.6	
Progressive Party for the Future	Shinji Suzuki	2,068	1.0	
Turnout			54.26	▲2.06
LDP hold				

2024
Party	Candidate	Votes	%	±%
Independent	Katsuei Hirasawa	64,495	34.78	▼15.37
DPP	Yoriko Madoka (elected by PR)	51,975	28.03	▲15.38
Ishin	Sachiko Inokuchi (elected by PR)	42,420	22.87	▲0.92
JCP	Sugio Arai	26,564	14.32	▼0.93
Turnout		185,454	52.20	▼0.86

2021
Party	Candidate	Votes	%	±%
LDP	Katsuei Hirasawa	119,384	50.1	▼7.8
Ishin	Sachiko Inokuchi	52,260	22.0	
JCP	Sugio Arai	36,309	15.3	▼4.3
DPP	Yoriko Madoka	30,103	12.6	
Turnout			53.06	
LDP hold				

2017
Party	Candidate	Votes	%	±%
LDP	Katsuei Hirasawa	127,632	57.9	▼1.4
Kibō no Tō	Chikara Nishida	49,485	22.5	
JCP	Sugio Arai	43,138	19.6	▲0.8
Turnout			50.04	
LDP hold				

2014
Party	Candidate	Votes	%	±%
LDP	Katsuei Hirasawa	125,351	59.3	▲4.2
Ishin	Miho Takahashi	46,156	21.9	
JCP	Sugio Arai	39,724	18.8	▲8.7
Turnout			51.55	▼7.3
LDP hold				

2012
Party	Candidate	Votes	%	±%
LDP	Katsuei Hirasawa	131,471	55.1	
JRP – YP	Hitoshi Kobayashi	45,285	19.0	
DPJ – PNP	Kumiko Hayakawa	37,592	15.8	
JCP	Sugio Arai	24,181	10.1	

2009
Party	Candidate	Votes	%	±%
LDP	Katsuei Hirasawa	138,512		
DPJ (PNP support)	Kumiko Hayakawa (elected via PR)	106,892		
JCP	Sugio Arai	21,448		
HRP	Ippei Fukao	2,787		
Turnout		284,935	65.22	

2005
Party	Candidate	Votes	%	±%
LDP	Katsuei Hirasawa	161,324		
DPJ	Atsushi Nishikōri	67,300		
JCP	Sachiko Kojima	27,597		
Turnout		274,356	63.73	

2003
Party	Candidate	Votes	%	±%
LDP	Katsuei Hirasawa	142,916		
DPJ	Atsushi Nishikōri	65,269		
JCP	Katsusuke Kanno	22,316		
Turnout		245,312	57.39	

2000
Party	Candidate	Votes	%	±%
LDP	Katsuei Hirasawa	95,606		
Kōmeitō	Natsuo Yamaguchi	74,633		
DPJ	Kumiko Yoneyama	42,882		
JCP	Jun'ichi Mikota	41,083		

1996
Party	Candidate	Votes	%	±%
LDP	Katsuei Hirasawa	73,726		
NFP	Natsuo Yamaguchi	63,732		
JCP	Akira Sugie	34,662		
DPJ	Kumiko Yoneyama	33,667		
Independent	Shigenobu Sekine	9,236		
"Green Party"	Kiyoko Shinagawa	1,755		
Turnout		223,645	53.56	
