= Hirosaki Gakuin University =

Coordinates: 40°35′02″N 140°28′05″E

- 弘前学院大学
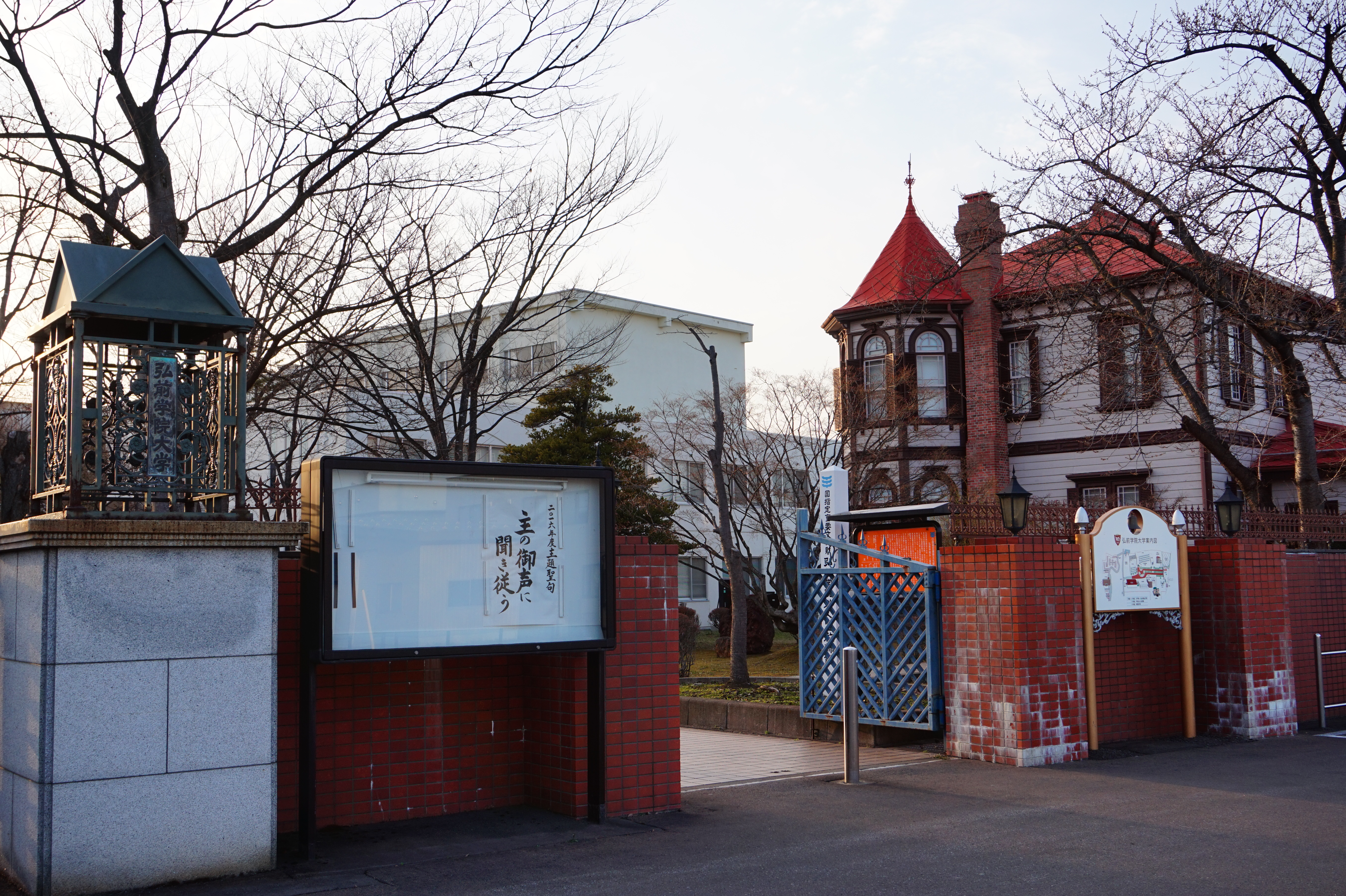
- Hirosaki Gakuin University, April 2016
- Type: Private
- Established: 1886
- President: Dr. Toshitada Yoshioka, MD
- Location: Hirosaki, Aomori, Japan
- Website: Official website

Hirosaki Gakuin University (弘前学院大学, Hirosaki gakuin daigaku) is a private university at Hirosaki, Aomori Prefecture, Japan. The predecessor of the school was founded in 1886, and it was chartered as a university in 1971.

== History ==
Hirosaki Gakuin University opened in 1886 as the first general education school for females in Aomori prefecture. The Tsugaru clan of Hirosaki supported Mr. Yoichi Honda's pioneering doctrine of Christian education for the nation. Currently, a junior high school, high school, university, and a graduate school comprise the educational organization. Hirosaki Gakuin University, founded in the spirit of “Honoring God, Loving People,” opened as a junior college in 1950. In 1971, a four-year School of Liberal Arts was established; followed by the opening of the School of Social Welfare in 1999 and the School of Nursing in 2005. In 2003, the Graduate School of Social Welfare was opened, followed by the Graduate School of Liberal Arts in 2005. The university now comprises three undergraduate schools encompassing four departments and two graduate programs.

== Organization ==
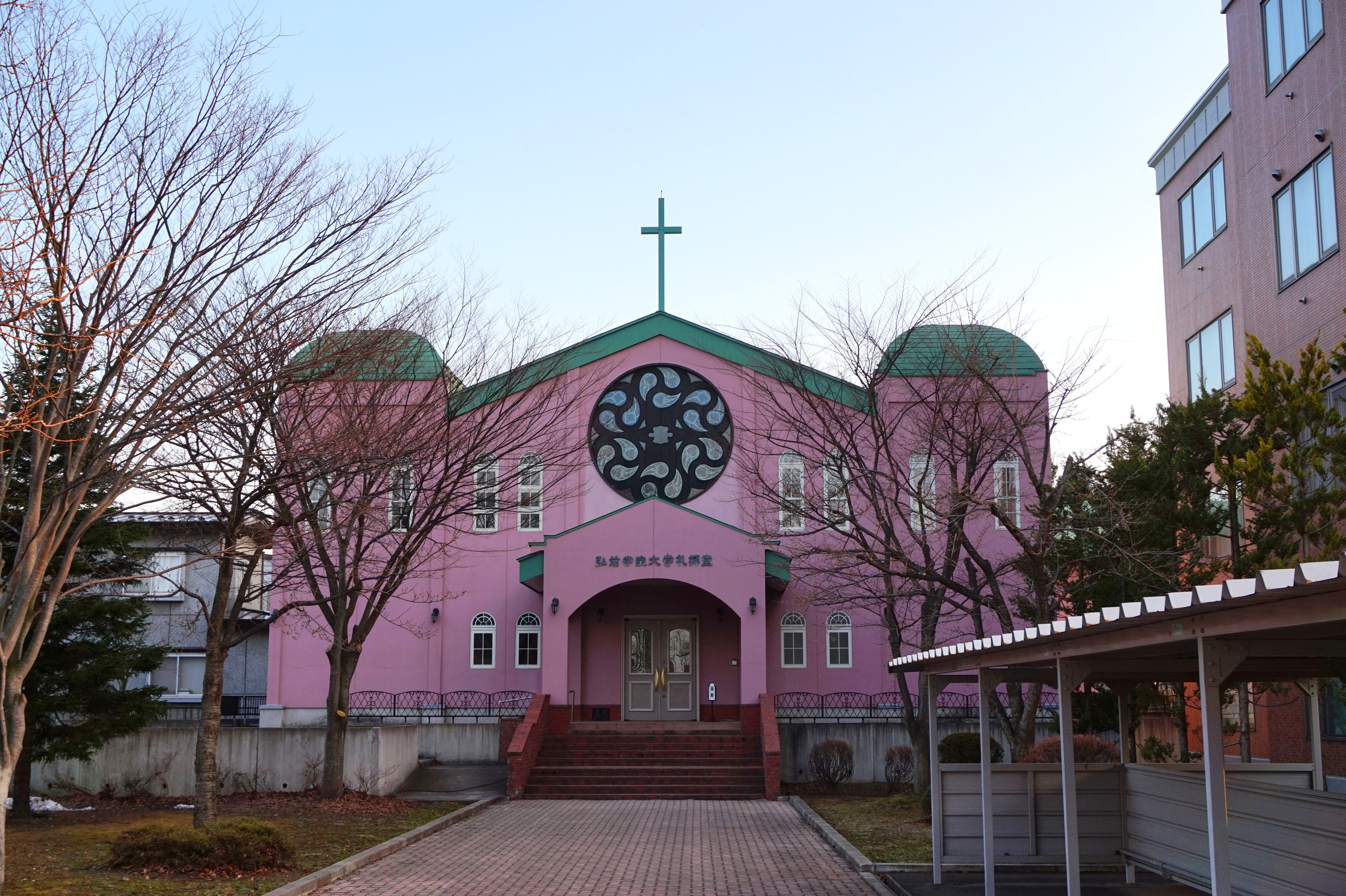
The chapel located on the university campus

Hirosaki Gakuin University comprises three separate schools: The School of Liberal Arts, The School of Social Welfare, and The School of Nursing.

=== The School of Liberal Arts ===
The School of Liberal Arts houses two departments: the English Department and the Japanese Department. These departments primarily offer majors in English, English Language Education, Japanese, and Japanese Language Education. Additionally, the School of Liberal Arts offers a Teacher's Certification program which prepares students for the prefectural teacher certification examination.
