= Hiroshi Kawaguchi =

Hiroshi Kawaguchi may refer to:

- Hiroshi Kawaguchi (actor), Japanese actor
- Hiroshi Kawaguchi (composer), Japanese composer
