= Yukiko Miyake =

Japanese politician (1965–2020)

- 三宅 雪子
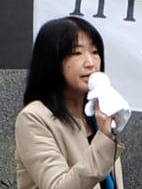

Member of the House of Representatives
- In office 30 August 2009 – 16 November 2012
- Constituency: Northern Kanto PR

Personal details
- Born: 5 March 1965 Washington, D.C., U.S.
- Died: 2 January 2020 (aged 54) Ōta, Tokyo, Japan
- Party: Democratic (2009–2012)
- Other political affiliations: PLF (2012); TPJ (2012–2013); PLP (2013–2015)
- Relatives: Hirohide Ishida (grandfather)
- Education: Kyoritsu Women's University

Yukiko Miyake (Japanese: 三宅 雪子; 5 March 1965 – 2 January 2020) was an American-born Japanese politician. She served one term in the Japanese House of Representatives.

== Early life ==
Miyake's father, Wasuke Miyake, was a diplomat to the United States, and she was thus born in Washington D.C. Her maternal grandfather is Hirohide Ishida. She held Japanese citizenship. She attended Toho Joshi middle and high school, Tamagawa Gakuen Junior College for Women, and Kyoritsu Women's University.

== Fuji Television ==
In 1988, Miyake began working for Fuji Television. She worked in sales, newsroom, and corporate social responsibility departments. When she worked in the newsroom, she reported on the economy, especially exchange rates and the stock exchange.

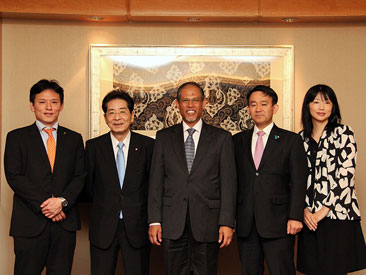
Yoshito Sengoku, Kenji Tamura, Hajime Yatagawa and Yukiko Miyake, Members of the House of Representatives, met Masagos Zulkifli, Minister of State for Home Affairs and Foreign Affairs, in Singapore in May 2012.

== Political career ==
On 27 July 2009, Ichiro Ozawa asked Miyake to run for office. She left her job at Fuji TV to do so. She ran for office during the 2009 Japanese general election against Yasuo Fukuda, the former Prime Minister of Japan, to represent Gunma's 4th district in the House of Representatives. Her grandfather's secretary, Masaki Nakajima, was also a candidate, but Miyake became the Democratic Party's official candidate. During the previous election in 2005, the Democrat's candidate lost to Fukuda by about 62,000 votes. Japanese media called Miyake and other women who Ozawa urged to run for office "Ozawa girls". Their goal was to replace established politicians with fresh blood in order to create a more inclusive political environment. While she lost the election for the district seat, she was elected to the proportional representation block.

On 22 January 2012, Miyake announced on Twitter that she would be the vice chair of a committee to reduce the cost of electricity.

In the same year, Miyake opposed a bill to raise the consumption tax, and resigned from her position as the Democratic Party's vice chair of public relations on 23 April. On 26 June, she voted against the consumption tax, contrary to her party's strategy. On 2 July, Miyake tendered her resignation from the party alongside Kenji Yamaoka and other party members. However, the Democratic Party's Board of Governors didn't accept the resignation letters during their meeting on 3 July, but officially accepted them during their meeting on 9 July.

After resigning from the Democratic party, Miyake joined People's Life First, a new political party, on 11 July. She then lost the 2012 Japanese general election.

In July 2013, Miyake was the Liberal Party's candidate in the 23rd Japanese House of Councillors election, but was not elected.

After some trouble with other members of her party, Miyake left the Liberal Party in April 2015.

== Death ==
On 2 January 2020, Tokyo Wangan Police Station found Miyake's body near Tokyo Bay; the cause of death was presumed to be suicide.
