= Seiichirō Dōkyū =

Japanese politician (1953–2026)

- 道休 誠一郎

Member of the House of Representatives
- In office 31 August 2009 – 16 November 2012
- Constituency: Kyushu PR

Personal details
- Born: 1 April 1953 Miyazaki, Japan
- Died: 3 February 2026 (aged 72) Miyazaki, Japan
- Party: Democratic
- Other political affiliations: DP (2017)
- Education: Sophia University; School of International and Public Affairs, Columbia University
- Occupation: Banker

Seiichirō Dōkyū (Japanese: 道休誠一郎 Dōkyū Seiichirō; 1 April 1953 – 3 February 2026) was a Japanese politician. A member of the Democratic Party, he served in the House of Representatives from 2009 to 2012.

Dōkyū died in Miyazaki on 3 February 2026, at the age of 72.
