= Ryosei Tanaka =

Japanese politician

- 田中 良生
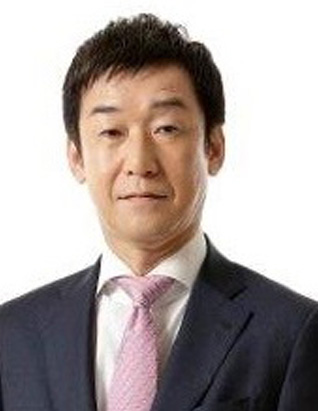
- Official portrait, 2018

Member of the House of Representatives
- Incumbent
- Assumed office 18 December 2012
- Preceded by: Satoshi Takayama
- Constituency: Saitama 15th
- In office 11 September 2005 – 21 July 2009
- Preceded by: Satoshi Takayama
- Succeeded by: Satoshi Takayama
- Constituency: Saitama 15th

Personal details
- Born: 11 November 1963 (age 62) Warabi, Saitama, Japan
- Party: Liberal Democratic
- Education: Rikkyo University

Ryosei Tanaka (田中 良生, Tanaka Ryōsei; born 11 November 1963) is a Japanese politician serving in the House of Representatives in the Diet (national legislature) as a member of the Liberal Democratic Party. A native of Warabi, Saitama and graduate of Rikkyo University, he was elected for the first time in 2005.
