= Koichi Tani =

Japanese politician

- 谷 公一
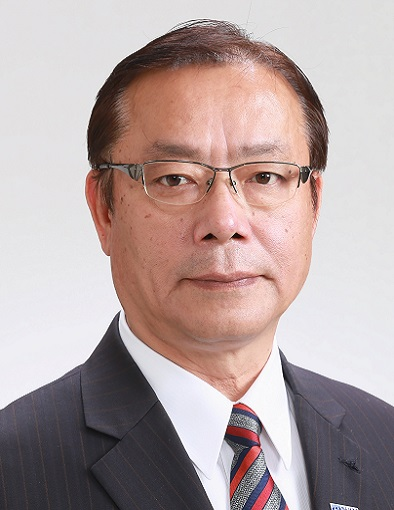
- Official portrait, 2022

Chairman of the National Public Safety Commission
- In office 10 August 2022 – 13 September 2023
- Prime Minister: Fumio Kishida
- Preceded by: Satoshi Ninoyu
- Succeeded by: Yoshifumi Matsumura

Member of the House of Representatives
- Incumbent
- Assumed office 10 November 2003
- Preceded by: Yōichi Tani
- Constituency: Hyōgo 5th (2003–2009); Kinki PR (2009–2012); Hyōgo 5th (2012–present)

Personal details
- Born: 28 January 1952 (age 74) Muraoka, Hyōgo, Japan
- Party: Liberal Democratic
- Parent: Yōichi Tani (father)
- Education: Meiji University

Koichi Tani (谷 公一, Tani Kōichi; born 28 January 1952) is a Japanese politician serving in the House of Representatives in the Diet (national legislature) as a member of the Liberal Democratic Party. A native of Muraoka, Hyōgo and graduate of Meiji University, he was elected for the first time in 2003.
