= Satoshi Takayama =

Japanese politician

- 高山 智司
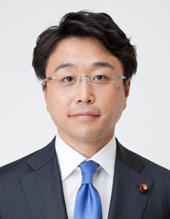
- Official portrait, 2011

Member of the House of Representatives; from Northern Kanto
- In office 9 November 2003 – 16 November 2012
- Preceded by: Constituency established
- Succeeded by: Ryosei Tanaka
- Constituency: Saitama 15th (2003–2005); PR block (2005–2009); Saitama 15th (2009–2012)

Personal details
- Born: 20 April 1970 (age 56) Bunkyō, Tokyo, Japan
- Party: Independent
- Other political affiliations: LP (1999–2003); DPJ (2003–2016); DP (2016–2017); KnT (2017)
- Education: Meiji University

Satoshi Takayama (高山 智司, Takayama Satoshi; born 20 April 1970) is a former Japanese politician who served in the House of Representatives in the Diet (national legislature) as a member of the Democratic Party of Japan. A native of Tokyo and graduate of Meiji University, he was elected for the first time in 2003.
