= Yasuyuki Eda =

Japanese politician

- 江田 康幸
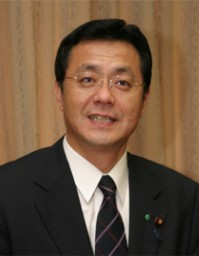

Member of the House of Representatives
- In office 25 June 2000 – 14 October 2021
- Constituency: Kyushu PR

Personal details
- Born: 19 March 1956 (age 70) Yame, Fukuoka, Japan
- Party: Komeito
- Education: Kumamoto University

Yasuyuki Eda (江田 康幸, Eda Yasuyuki; born 19 March 1956) is a Japanese politician of the New Komeito Party, a member of the House of Representatives in the Diet (national legislature). A native of Yame, Fukuoka, he attended Kumamoto University as both undergraduate and graduate and studied abroad in Boston University in the United States. He was elected for the first time in 2000.
