= Akira Ishii =

Japanese politician

- 石井 章

Member of the House of Councillors
- In office 26 July 2016 – 1 September 2025
- Constituency: National PR

Member of the House of Representatives
- In office 31 August 2009 – 16 November 2012
- Constituency: Northern Kanto PR

Member of the Toride City Council
- In office 2005–2009

Member of the Fujishiro Town Council
- In office 1990–2005

Personal details
- Born: 6 May 1957 (age 69) Toride, Ibaraki, Japan
- Party: Innovation (2016–2025)
- Other political affiliations: DPJ (2009–2012); PLF (2012); TPJ (2012–2013); JRP (2013–2014); JIP (2014–2016)
- Education: Senshu University

Akira Ishii (born 6 May 1957 in Ibaraki Prefecture) is a Japanese former politician who served as a member of the House of Councillors of Japan from 2016 until his resignation in 2025. He represented the National proportional representation block and was a member of the Japan Innovation Party.

On 1 September 2025, Ishii resigned from the House of Councillors after allegations of defrauding the government and his subsequent expulsion from the Japan Innovation Party. He was indicted on charges of fraud on 30 September.
