= Katsuei Hirasawa =

Japanese politician

- 平沢 勝栄
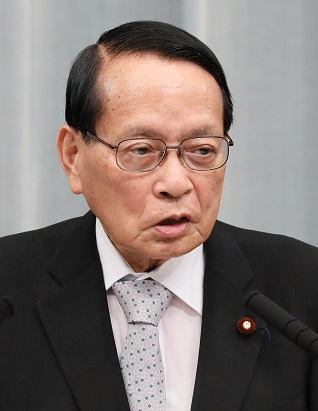
- Hirasawa in 2020

Minister of Reconstruction
- In office 16 September 2020 – 4 October 2021
- Prime Minister: Yoshihide Suga
- Preceded by: Kazunori Tanaka
- Succeeded by: Kosaburo Nishime

Member of the House of Representatives for Tokyo's 17th district
- Incumbent
- Assumed office 20 October 1996
- Preceded by: Constituency established

Personal details
- Born: 4 September 1945 (age 80) Shirakawa, Gifu, Japan
- Party: Liberal Democratic
- Education: University of Tokyo; Duke University
- Website: Official website

Katsuei Hirasawa (平沢 勝栄, Hirasawa Katsuei; born 4 September 1945) is a Japanese politician who served as the Minister of Reconstruction in Yoshihide Suga's cabinet. A member of the House of Representatives, Hirasawa is a member of the Liberal Democratic Party and is affiliated to the revisionist lobby Nippon Kaigi.

== Biography ==
Hirasawa is a native of the village of Shirakawa, Gifu. He graduated from the University of Tokyo with a Bachelor of Law. As a student, he served for two years as a private tutor to the elementary school-aged Shinzo Abe. He joined the National Police Agency in 1968 and attended Duke University in the United States while in the agency. He retired from the Agency in 1995 with the rank of Senior Commissioner (警視監, Keishi-kan).

He was elected to the House of Representatives for the first time in 1996.

Political offices
Preceded by Chiken Kakazu; Yoshitaka Sakurada; Taimei Yamaguchi	Senior Vice Minister of the Cabinet Office; 2006–2007; Served alongside: Yoshimi Watanabe, Yoshimasa Hayashi	Succeeded by Ben Kimura; Akihiko Yamamoto; Yoshio Nakagawa
House of Representatives (Japan)
New district	Representative for Tokyo 17th district 1996–present	Incumbent
