= Masaaki Itokawa =

Japanese politician (born 1974)

- 糸川 正晃
- Official portrait, 2012

Member of the House of Representatives
- In office 11 September 2005 – 16 November 2012
- Constituency: Hokuriku-Shin'etsu PR

Personal details
- Born: 21 December 1974 (age 51) Tokyo, Japan
- Party: Democratic
- Other political affiliations: PNP (2005–2009); LDP (2018–2019)
- Education: Keio University

Masaaki Itokawa (糸川 正晃, Itokawa Masaaki; born 21 December 1974) is a Japanese politician of the People's New Party, and he was a member of the House of Representatives in the Diet (national legislature). A native of Tokyo and graduate of Keio University, he was elected to the House of Representatives for the first time in 2005 to represent the 2nd District of the Proportional Hokuriku-Shin'etsu Block. He was a representative from 2005 until 2012.
