= Mitsue Kondo =

Japanese politician (born 1953)

- 近藤 三津枝

Member of the House of Representatives
- In office 11 September 2005 – 16 November 2012
- Constituency: Kinki PR

Personal details
- Born: 14 June 1953 (age 73) Ashiya, Hyōgo, Japan
- Party: Liberal Democratic
- Education: Konan Women's University

Mitsue Kondo (近藤 三津枝, Kondō Mitsue; born 14 June 1953) is a Japanese politician of the Liberal Democratic Party, a member of the House of Representatives in the Diet (national legislature). A native of Hyōgo and graduate of Konan University, she was elected for the first time in 2005.
