= Yasuko Ikenobō =

Japanese politician (born 1942)

- 池坊 保子
- Official portrait, 2007

Member of the House of Representatives
- In office 21 October 1996 – 16 November 2012
- Preceded by: Constituency established
- Succeeded by: Multi-member district
- Constituency: Kinki PR

Personal details
- Born: Yasuko Umetani; 18 April 1942 Tokyo, Japan
- Party: Komeito
- Other political affiliations: NFP (1996–1998)
- Spouse: Sen'ei Ikenobō (m. 1963)
- Children: Yuki Ikenobō; Mika Ikenobō
- Relatives: Prince Kuni Asahiko; (great-grandfather); Empress Nagako; (cousin aunt); Akihito (second cousin)
- Education: Gakushuin University

Yasuko Ikenobō (池坊 保子, Ikenobō Yasuko; née Umetani; born 18 April 1942) is a Japanese politician.

== Biography ==
She was born in Tokyo the third daughter of Viscount Michitora Umetani, head of a former kuge family and Member of the House of Peers. Her mother, Natsuko Sengoku was Empress Nagako's cousin. She enrolled but later left Gakushuin University in 1961. She has been married to Sen'ei Ikenobō (池坊 専永), the Ikenobō family patriarch, since 1963 and has two daughters, Yuki (池坊 由紀), the next head of the family, and Mika (池坊 美佳).

She was elected to the House of Representatives in the National Diet (national legislature) for the first time in 1996 as a member of the New Frontier Party, which later split into several parties including the New Komeito Party.

She was a Komeito politician, but she was not a member of Sōka Gakkai as former Councillor Kunihiro Tsuzuki and Councillor Shozo Kusakawa.

In 2022, she was appointed in the Yokozuna Deliberation Council, hence being the second woman to be appointed in an organization linked to the Japan Sumo Association.

== Sources ==
- 政治家情報 〜池坊 保子〜. www.senkyo.janjan.jp ザ･選挙 (in Japanese). JANJAN.
