= Yoshio Urushibara =

Japanese politician (born 1944)

- 漆原 良夫

Member of the House of Representatives
- In office 21 October 1996 – 28 September 2017
- Preceded by: Constituency established
- Succeeded by: Masataka Ōta
- Constituency: Hokuriku-Shin'etsu PR

Personal details
- Born: 18 November 1944 (age 81) Tsubame, Niigata, Japan
- Party: Komeito
- Other political affiliations: NFP (1996–1998)
- Education: Meiji University

Yoshio Urushibara (漆原 良夫, Urushibara Yoshio; born 18 November 1944) is a Japanese politician of the New Komeito Party, a member of the House of Representatives in the Diet (national legislature).

== Early life ==
Urushibara is a native of Tsubame, Niigata and graduate of Meiji University. He passed the Japanese bar examination during his final year of university, and was admitted to the bar in 1971.

== Political career ==
He was elected for the first time in 1996 as a member of the New Frontier Party, which later split into several parties including the New Komeito Party. He was re-elected in 2000, 2003, 2005, 2009, 2012 and 2014.

As of 2017, he serves as chairman of the New Komeito Central Committee, in which capacity he works closely with LDP Secretary-General Toshihiro Nikai to manage the ruling coalition.
