= Yoshio Mochizuki =

Japanese politician (1947–2019)

- 望月 義夫
- Official portrait, 2006

Minister of Environment
- In office 3 September 2014 – 2 October 2015
- Prime Minister: Shinzo Abe
- Preceded by: Nobuteru Ishihara
- Succeeded by: Tamayo Marukawa

Member of the House of Representatives
- In office 24 January 2011 – 19 December 2019
- Preceded by: Hideaki Ōmura
- Succeeded by: Yōichi Fukazawa
- Constituency: Tōkai PR (2011–2012); Shizuoka 4th (2012–2019)
- In office 22 October 1996 – 21 July 2009
- Preceded by: Constituency established
- Succeeded by: Kenji Tamura
- Constituency: Shizuoka 4th

Member of the Shizuoka Prefectural Assembly
- In office 1991–1996

Member of the Shimizu City Assembly
- In office 1975–1991

Personal details
- Born: 2 May 1947 Shimizu, Shizuoka, Japan
- Died: 19 December 2019 (aged 72) Shimizu, Shizuoka, Japan
- Party: Liberal Democratic
- Education: Chuo University

Yoshio Mochizuki (望月 義夫, Mochizuki Yoshio; 2 May 1947 – 19 December 2019) was a Japanese politician of the Liberal Democratic Party, a member of the House of Representatives in the Diet (national legislature), and a Minister of the Environment.

== Early life ==
Mochizuki was a native of Shimizu, Shizuoka and graduate of Chuo University.

== Political career ==
Mochizuki was elected to the first of his four terms in the city assembly of Shimizu in 1975 and to the first of his two terms in the assembly of Shizuoka Prefecture in 1991.

He was elected to the House of Representatives for the first time in 1996 as an independent. He was affiliated to the openly revisionist organization Nippon Kaigi.

Mochizuki died in office at the age of 72 on 19 December 2019.

Political offices
Preceded by Nobuteru Ishihara	Minister of the Environment; 2014–2015	Succeeded by Tamayo Marukawa
