= Ryoichi Hattori (politician) =

Japanese politician (born 1950)

- 服部 良一
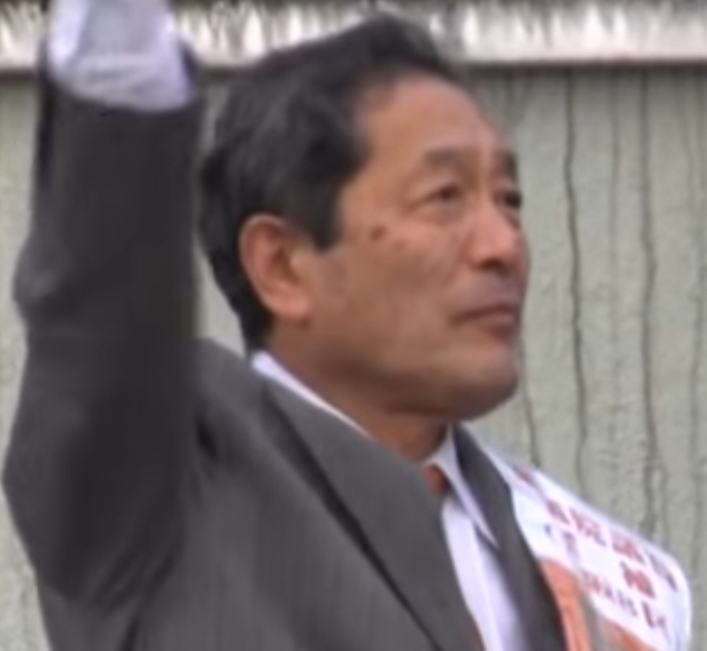
- Hattori in 2014

Member of the House of Representatives
- In office 31 August 2009 – 16 November 2012
- Preceded by: Kiyomi Tsujimoto
- Succeeded by: Fumiyoshi Murakami
- Constituency: Kinki PR

Personal details
- Born: 24 February 1950 (age 76) Yame, Fukuoka, Japan
- Party: Social Democratic
- Education: Kyoto University

Ryoichi Hattori (服部良一, Hattori Ryoichi; born 24 February 1950) is a Japanese politician of the Social Democratic Party. He was born in Yame city in Fukuoka prefecture. He entered Kyoto University in 1969 before leaving part-way through his degree and moving to Osaka to work, where he became active with the trade union movement.

In the House of Councillors 2007 election he ran for the House of Councillors in Osaka, but was defeated. He became the private secretary of Tokushin Yamauchi, an SDP member of the House of Councillors.

In the 2009 general election he was elected as the House of Representatives member representing the Kinki block.
