= Kumiko Hayakawa =

Japanese politician (born 1971)

- 早川 久美子

Member of the House of Representatives
- In office 30 August 2009 – 16 November 2012
- Constituency: Tokyo PR

Member of the Katsushika Ward Assembly
- In office 2001–2009

Personal details
- Born: 18 January 1971 (age 55) Katsushika, Tokyo, Japan
- Party: Democratic
- Education: California State University, Sacramento

Kumiko Hayakawa (早川 久美子, Hayakawa Kumiko; born 18 January 1971) is a former Japanese politician of the Democratic Party of Japan and a former member of the House of Representatives in the Diet (national legislature). She was elected for the first time in 2009. Japanese media revealed that Hayakawa was a former swimsuit model and called her one of "Ozawa's girls" in reference to Ichirō Ozawa, the DPJ leader at the time. In 2010 Hayakawa was part of a parliamentary delegation to President of the Republic of China Ma Ying-jeou. In 2012 Hayakawa appeared as a ring girl at a professional boxing match.

A native of Katsushika, Tokyo, she attended California State University, Sacramento.
