= Kenji Tamura =

Japanese politician

- 田村 謙治
- Official portrait, 2009

Member of the House of Representatives
- In office 15 November 2004 – 16 November 2012
- Preceded by: Yuzuru Tsuzuki
- Succeeded by: Yoshio Mochizuki
- Constituency: Tōkai PR (2004–2009); Shizuoka 4th (2009–2012)

Personal details
- Born: 19 March 1968 (age 58) Nerima, Tokyo, Japan
- Party: Democratic
- Other political affiliations: Kibō no Tō (2017)
- Education: University of Tokyo; University of Michigan

Kenji Tamura (田村 謙治, Tamura Kenji; born 19 March 1968) is a former Japanese politician who served in the House of Representatives in the Diet (national legislature) as a member of the Democratic Party of Japan. A native of Shizuoka, Shizuoka and graduate of the University of Tokyo, he worked at the Ministry of Finance from 1991 to 2002 and attended the Ford School at the University of Michigan in 1993. He was elected for the first time in 2004 after an unsuccessful run in 2003. He is an assenter of the movie The Truth about Nanjing.
