= 2026 Japanese general election in Hokuriku-Shin'etsu block =

- 8 February 2026

All 28 seats to the House of Representatives
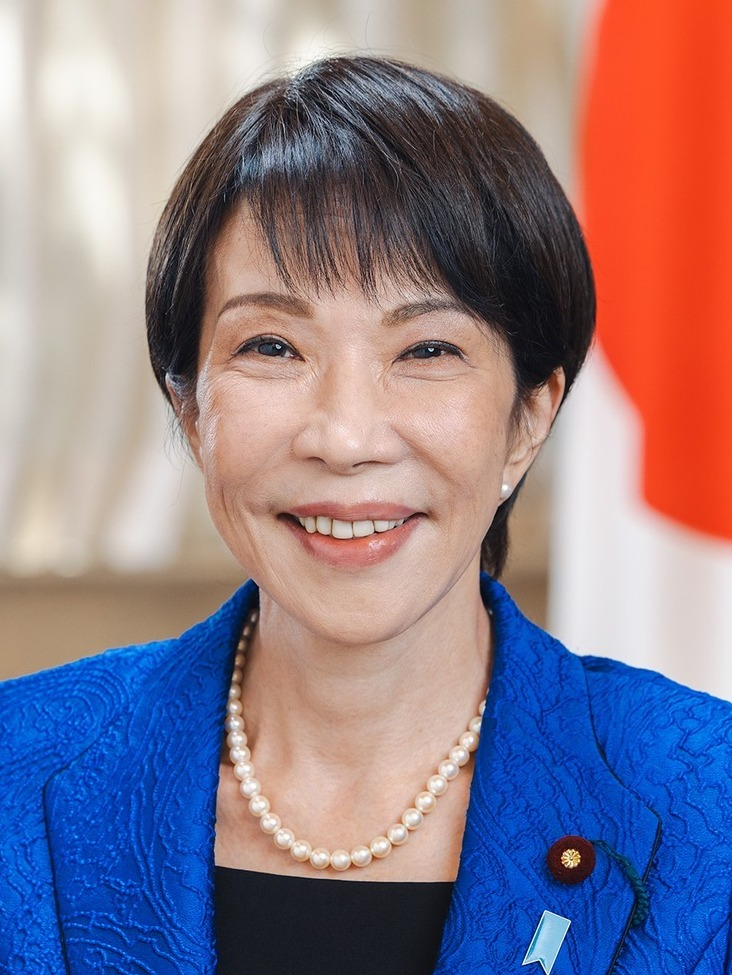

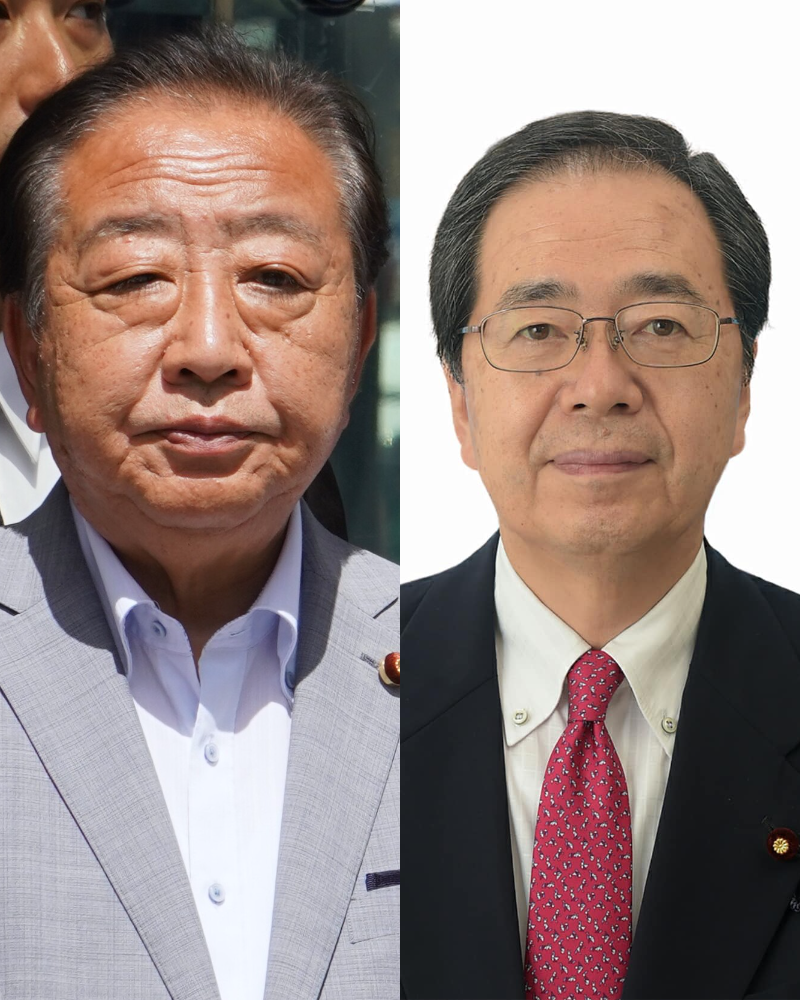

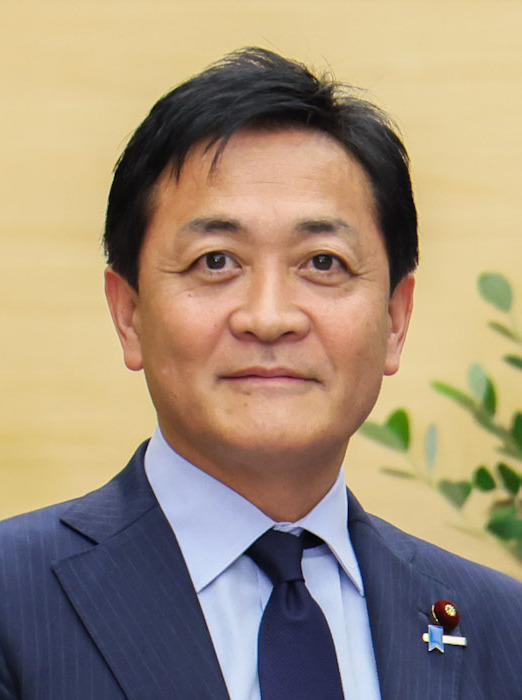

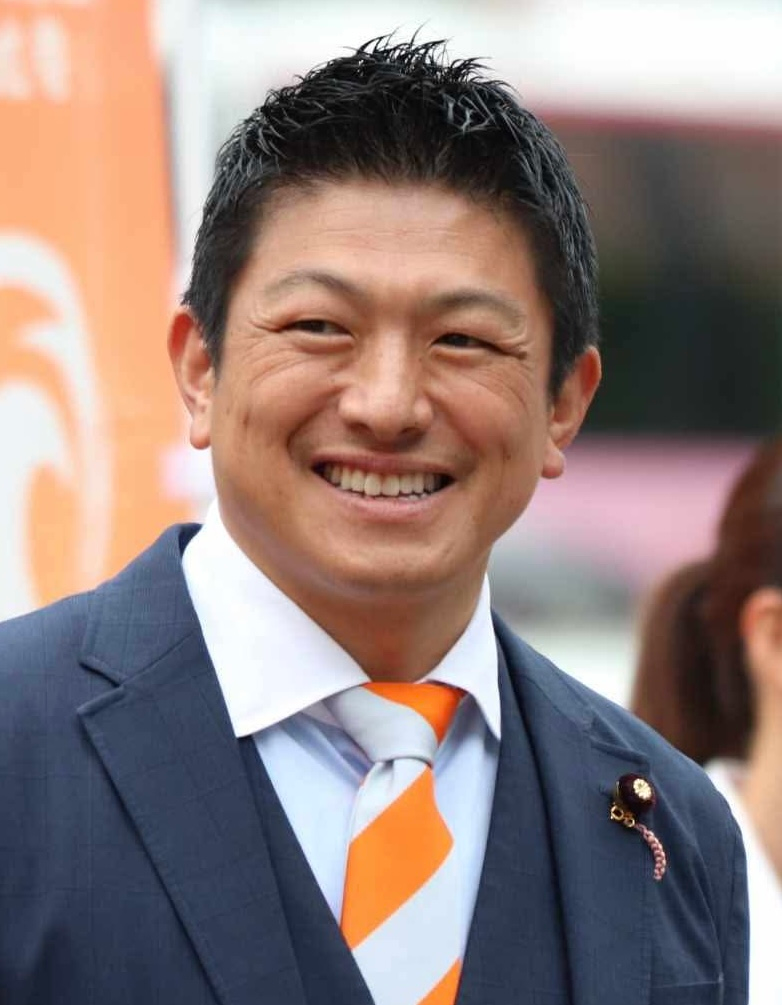

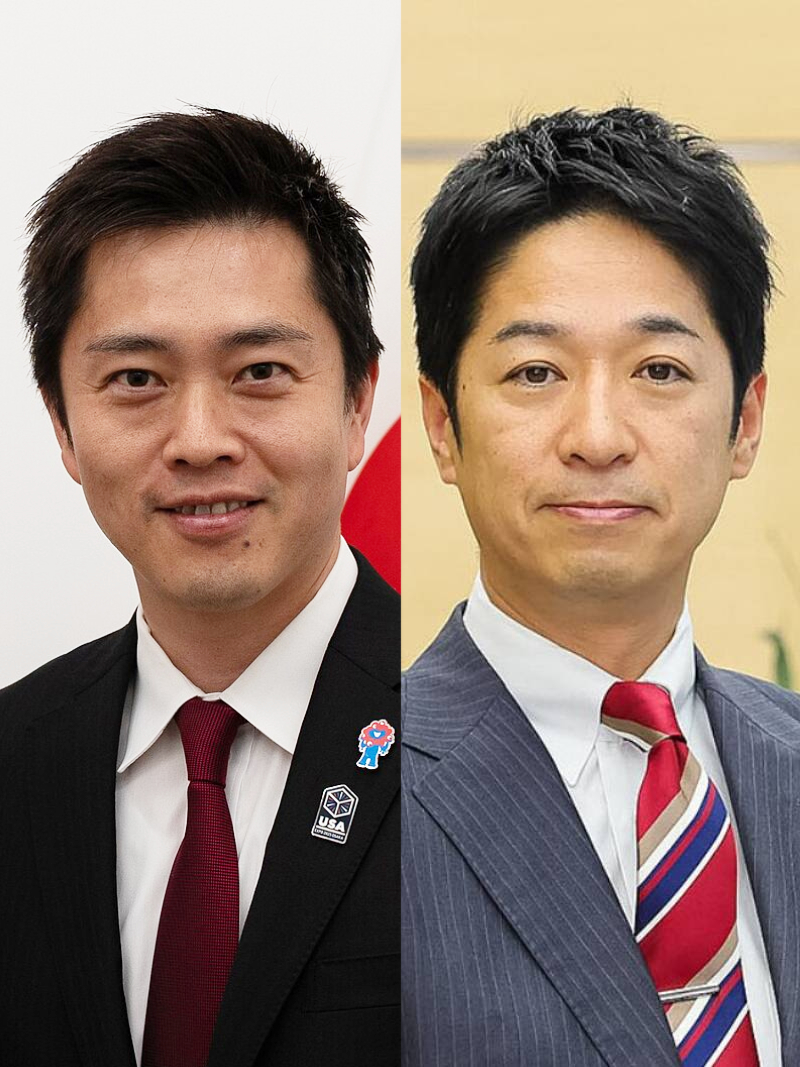
	Majority party	Minority party	Third party
Party	LDP	Centrist Reform	DPP
Last election	12 seats	14 seats (Note: As CDP and Komeito)	1 seat
Constituency	18	0	0
Constituency vote	1,809,052; 55.03%	902,006; 27.44%	168,231; 5.12%
PR seats	3	4	1
Regional vote	1,387,716; 42.09%	651,331; 19.76%	322,739; 9.79%
Total	21	4	1
Seat change	▲9	▼10	0
	Fourth party	Fifth party
Party	Sanseitō	Ishin
Last election	0 seats	1 seat
Constituency	0	0
Constituency vote	214,703; 6.53%	92,660; 2.82%
PR seats	1	1
Regional vote	285,897; 8.67%	231,686; 7.03%
Total	1	1
Seat change	▲1	0

This page contains the detailed results for the 2026 Japanese general election in the Hokuriku-Shin'etsu proportional representation block.

The Hokuriku-Shin'etsu block covers the prefectures of Niigata, Toyama, Ishikawa, Fukui, and Nagano and elects 10 members by party-list proportional representation. In addition to the block seats, Hokuriku-Shin'etsu has 18 constituencies each electing a single member by first-past-the-post voting.

== Overall results ==
Party	Constituency			Proportional			Total seats
Party	Votes	%	Seats	Votes	%	Seats	Total seats
Liberal Democratic Party	1,809,052	55.03	18	1,387,716	42.09	3	21
Centrist Reform Alliance	902,006	27.44	0	651,331	19.76	4	4
Democratic Party For the People	168,231	5.12	0	322,739	9.79	1	1
Sanseito	214,703	6.53	0	285,897	8.67	1	1
Nippon Ishin no Kai	92,660	2.82	0	231,686	7.03	1	1
Japanese Communist Party	89,327	2.72	0	140,311	4.26	0	0
Reiwa Shinsengumi	11,296	0.34	0	100,497	3.05	0	0
Conservative Party of Japan				73,566	2.23	0	0
Social Democratic Party				50,017	1.52	0	0
Tax Cuts Japan and Yukoku Alliance				40,094	1.22	0	0
Consideration the Euthanasia System				13,014	0.39	0	0
Total	3,287,275	100.00	18	3,296,868	100.00	10	28
Invalid/blank votes							
Voter turnout							
Registered voters							

== Single-member constituencies ==
Single-member constituency results in Hokuriku-Shin'etsu
Constituency	Previous member		Elected member		Votes	%	Margin	Status
Niigata 1st	Chinami Nishimura	CRA	Kou Uchiyama	LDP	92,578	46.8	19,411	LDP gain from CRA
Niigata 2nd	Makiko Kikuta	CRA	Isato Kunisada	LDP	111,803	49.0	26,201	LDP gain from CRA
Niigata 3rd	Takahiro Kuroiwa	CRA	Hiroaki Saito	LDP	115,991	54.6	39,539	LDP gain from CRA
Niigata 4th	Ryuichi Yoneyama	CRA	Eiichiro Washio	LDP	107,128	53.6	44,682	LDP gain from CRA
Niigata 5th	Mamoru Umetani	CRA	Shuichi Takatori	LDP	104,206	52.1	24,912	LDP gain from CRA
Toyama 1st	Hiroaki Tabata	LDP	Hiroshi Nakada	LDP	81,875	63.4	54,145	LDP hold
Toyama 2nd	Eishun Ueda	LDP	Eishun Ueda	LDP	88,839	74.7	58,735	LDP hold
Toyama 3rd	Keiichiro Tachibana	LDP	Keiichiro Tachibana	LDP	126,981	65.9	91,405	LDP hold
Ishikawa 1st	Takuo Komori	LDP	Takuo Komori	LDP	83,732	45.0	35,582	LDP hold
Ishikawa 2nd	Hajime Sasaki	LDP	Hajime Sasaki	LDP	139,808	83.6	112,332	LDP hold
Ishikawa 3rd	Kazuya Kondo	CRA	Shoji Nishida	LDP	73,034	51.9	8,141	LDP gain from CRA
Fukui 1st	Tomomi Inada	LDP	Tomomi Inada	LDP	93,292	48.1	54,363	LDP hold
Fukui 2nd	Hideyuki Tsuji	CRA	Takeshi Saiki	LDP	78,737	59.9	26,130	LDP gain from CRA
Nagano 1st	Takashi Shinohara	CRA	Kenta Wakabayashi	LDP	119,101	50.7	32,643	LDP gain from CRA
Nagano 2nd	Mitsu Shimojo	CRA	Hikaru Fujita	LDP	104,107	46.7	28,298	LDP gain from CRA
Nagano 3rd	Takeshi Kōzu	CRA	Yosei Ide	LDP	111,844	48.3	29,922	LDP gain from CRA
Nagano 4th	Shigeyuki Goto	LDP	Shigeyuki Goto	LDP	77,135	57.6	43,013	LDP hold
Nagano 5th	Ichiro Miyashita	LDP	Ichiro Miyashita	LDP	98,866	59.8	32,273	LDP hold

=== Niigata Prefecture ===
Niigata Prefecture
Party	Constituency			Proportional	
Party	Votes	%	Seats	Votes	%
Liberal Democratic Party	531,706	51.20	5	449,769	43.49
Centrist Reform Alliance	376,961	36.30	0	233,757	22.60
Democratic Party For the People	15,842	1.53	0	87,646	8.47
Sanseito	88,110	8.48	0	78,539	7.59
Nippon Ishin no Kai	19,333	1.86	0	59,620	5.76
Japanese Communist Party	6,574	0.63	0	38,503	3.72
Reiwa Shinsengumi				30,242	2.92
Conservative Party of Japan				22,869	2.21
Social Democratic Party				17,179	1.66
Tax Cuts Japan and Yukoku Alliance				12,073	1.17
Consideration the Euthanasia System				4,063	0.39
Total	1,038,526	100.00	5	1,034,260	100.00
Invalid/blank votes					
Voter turnout					
Registered voters					

Niigata 1st district
Party	Candidate	Constituency		Proportional	
Party	Candidate	Votes	%	Votes	%
Liberal Democratic Party	Kou Uchiyama	92,578	46.78	81,270	41.14
Centrist Reform Alliance	Chinami Nishimura	73,167	36.97	44,134	22.34
Democratic Party For the People				18,353	9.29
Sanseito	Sachio Koike	15,492	7.83	14,880	7.53
Nippon Ishin no Kai	Kazunari Ito	10,092	5.10	13,188	6.68
Japanese Communist Party	Takeo Nakamura	6,574	3.32	8,352	4.23
Reiwa Shinsengumi				5,826	2.95
Conservative Party of Japan				4,997	2.53
Social Democratic Party				3,181	1.61
Tax Cuts Japan and Yukoku Alliance				2,531	1.28
Consideration the Euthanasia System				836	0.42
Total		197,903	100.00	197,548	100.00
Invalid/blank votes					
Voter turnout			56.42		
Registered voters		356,055		356,055	
LDP gain from CRA					

Niigata 2nd district
Party	Candidate	Constituency		Proportional	
Party	Candidate	Votes	%	Votes	%
Liberal Democratic Party	Isato Kunisada	111,803	48.98	95,633	42.11
Centrist Reform Alliance	Makiko Kikuta	85,602	37.50	52,068	22.93
Democratic Party For the People				19,356	8.52
Sanseito	Eriko Hirai	21,633	9.48	17,911	7.89
Nippon Ishin no Kai	Noriko Kanai	9,241	4.05	14,430	6.35
Japanese Communist Party				8,021	3.53
Reiwa Shinsengumi				7,047	3.10
Conservative Party of Japan				5,294	2.33
Social Democratic Party				3,479	1.53
Tax Cuts Japan and Yukoku Alliance				2,832	1.25
Consideration the Euthanasia System				1,010	0.44
Total		228,279	100.00	227,081	100.00
Invalid/blank votes					
Voter turnout			59.66		
Registered voters		387,989		387,989	
LDP gain from CRA					

Niigata 3rd district
Party	Candidate	Constituency		Proportional	
Party	Candidate	Votes	%	Votes	%
Liberal Democratic Party	Hiroaki Saito	115,991	54.63	94,142	44.59
Centrist Reform Alliance	Takahiro Kuroiwa	76,452	36.01	48,992	23.21
Democratic Party For the People				16,306	7.72
Sanseito	Keiko Sakuma	19,878	9.36	15,770	7.47
Nippon Ishin no Kai				10,652	5.05
Japanese Communist Party				7,866	3.73
Reiwa Shinsengumi				6,296	2.98
Conservative Party of Japan				4,384	2.08
Social Democratic Party				3,560	1.69
Tax Cuts Japan and Yukoku Alliance				2,379	1.13
Consideration the Euthanasia System				777	0.37
Total		212,321	100.00	211,124	100.00
Invalid/blank votes					
Voter turnout			59.15		
Registered voters		364,214		364,214	
LDP gain from CRA					

Niigata 4th district
Party	Candidate	Constituency		Proportional	
Party	Candidate	Votes	%	Votes	%
Liberal Democratic Party	Eiichiro Washio	107,128	53.56	87,664	44.03
Centrist Reform Alliance	Ryuichi Yoneyama	62,446	31.22	42,541	21.37
Democratic Party For the People	Taiki Nomura	15,842	7.92	18,883	9.48
Sanseito	Hisano Ooya	14,613	7.31	15,428	7.75
Nippon Ishin no Kai				11,311	5.68
Japanese Communist Party				6,829	3.43
Reiwa Shinsengumi				5,688	2.86
Conservative Party of Japan				4,322	2.17
Social Democratic Party				3,507	1.76
Tax Cuts Japan and Yukoku Alliance				2,203	1.11
Consideration the Euthanasia System				734	0.37
Total		200,029	100.00	199,110	100.00
Invalid/blank votes					
Voter turnout			58.44		
Registered voters		347,604		347,604	
LDP gain from CRA					

Niigata 5th district
Party	Candidate	Constituency		Proportional	
Party	Candidate	Votes	%	Votes	%
Liberal Democratic Party	Shuichi Takatori	104,206	52.10	91,060	45.67
Centrist Reform Alliance	Mamoru Umetani	79,294	39.65	46,022	23.08
Democratic Party For the People				14,748	7.40
Sanseito	Naoyuki Takano	16,494	8.25	14,550	7.30
Nippon Ishin no Kai				10,039	5.03
Japanese Communist Party				7,435	3.73
Reiwa Shinsengumi				5,385	2.70
Conservative Party of Japan				3,872	1.94
Social Democratic Party				3,452	1.73
Tax Cuts Japan and Yukoku Alliance				2,128	1.07
Consideration the Euthanasia System				706	0.35
Total		199,994	100.00	199,397	100.00
Invalid/blank votes					
Voter turnout			60.77		
Registered voters		334,805		334,805	
LDP gain from CRA					

=== Toyama Prefecture ===
Toyama Prefecture
Party	Constituency			Proportional	
Party	Votes	%	Seats	Votes	%
Liberal Democratic Party	297,695	67.55	3	200,772	45.61
Centrist Reform Alliance	57,834	13.12	0	62,844	14.28
Democratic Party For the People	35,576	8.07	0	50,750	11.53
Sanseito	31,264	7.09	0	39,486	8.97
Nippon Ishin no Kai				37,312	8.48
Japanese Communist Party	18,322	4.16	0	13,967	3.17
Reiwa Shinsengumi				11,288	2.56
Conservative Party of Japan				10,404	2.36
Social Democratic Party				6,027	1.37
Tax Cuts Japan and Yukoku Alliance				5,390	1.22
Consideration the Euthanasia System				1,962	0.45
Total	440,691	100.00	3	440,202	100.00
Invalid/blank votes					
Voter turnout					
Registered voters					

Toyama 1st district
Party	Candidate	Constituency		Proportional	
Party	Candidate	Votes	%	Votes	%
Liberal Democratic Party	Hiroshi Nakada	81,875	63.40	54,307	42.19
Centrist Reform Alliance	Toshihiro Yama	27,730	21.47	20,456	15.89
Democratic Party For the People				15,240	11.84
Sanseito	Takumi Saito	14,207	11.00	12,302	9.56
Nippon Ishin no Kai				11,513	8.94
Japanese Communist Party	Ryosuke Aoyama	5,323	4.12	4,617	3.59
Reiwa Shinsengumi				3,217	2.50
Conservative Party of Japan				3,380	2.63
Tax Cuts Japan and Yukoku Alliance				1,684	1.31
Social Democratic Party				1,418	1.10
Consideration the Euthanasia System				575	0.45
Total		129,135	100.00	128,709	100.00
Invalid/blank votes					
Voter turnout			50.10		
Registered voters		262,391		262,391	
LDP hold					

Toyama 2nd district
Party	Candidate	Constituency		Proportional	
Party	Candidate	Votes	%	Votes	%
Liberal Democratic Party	Eishun Ueda	88,839	74.69	55,732	46.54
Centrist Reform Alliance	Yasuharu Koshikawa	30,104	25.31	19,295	16.11
Democratic Party For the People				12,412	10.36
Sanseito				9,968	8.32
Nippon Ishin no Kai				9,341	7.80
Japanese Communist Party				3,373	2.82
Reiwa Shinsengumi				3,165	2.64
Conservative Party of Japan				2,734	2.28
Social Democratic Party				1,798	1.50
Tax Cuts Japan and Yukoku Alliance				1,435	1.20
Consideration the Euthanasia System				504	0.42
Total		118,943	100.00	119,757	100.00
Invalid/blank votes					
Voter turnout			52.08		
Registered voters		236,065		236,065	
LDP hold					

Toyama 3rd district
Party	Candidate	Constituency		Proportional	
Party	Candidate	Votes	%	Votes	%
Liberal Democratic Party	Keiichiro Tachibana	126,981	65.93	90,733	47.32
Democratic Party For the People	Keita Yamamoto	35,576	18.47	23,098	12.05
Centrist Reform Alliance				23,093	12.04
Sanseito	Miwako Jikibara	17,057	8.86	17,216	8.98
Nippon Ishin no Kai				16,458	8.58
Japanese Communist Party	Hiroshi Sakamoto	12,999	6.75	5,977	3.12
Reiwa Shinsengumi				4,906	2.56
Conservative Party of Japan				4,290	2.24
Social Democratic Party				2,811	1.47
Tax Cuts Japan and Yukoku Alliance				2,271	1.18
Consideration the Euthanasia System				883	0.46
Total		192,613	100.00	191,736	100.00
Invalid/blank votes					
Voter turnout			56.41		
Registered voters		347,887		347,887	
LDP hold					

=== Ishikawa Prefecture ===
Ishikawa Prefecture
Party	Constituency			Proportional	
Party	Votes	%	Seats	Votes	%
Liberal Democratic Party	296,569	60.01	3	225,413	44.70
Centrist Reform Alliance	64,893	13.13	0	77,185	15.31
Democratic Party For the People	48,150	9.74	0	54,796	10.87
Sanseito	23,350	4.72	0	48,221	9.56
Nippon Ishin no Kai	19,547	3.96	0	43,755	8.68
Japanese Communist Party	41,684	8.43	0	15,312	3.04
Reiwa Shinsengumi				14,483	2.87
Conservative Party of Japan				11,127	2.21
Tax Cuts Japan and Yukoku Alliance				6,620	1.31
Social Democratic Party				5,514	1.09
Consideration the Euthanasia System				1,809	0.36
Total	494,193	100.00	3	504,235	100.00
Invalid/blank votes					
Voter turnout					
Registered voters					

Ishikawa 1st district
Party	Candidate	Constituency		Proportional	
Party	Candidate	Votes	%	Votes	%
Liberal Democratic Party	Takuo Komori	83,732	44.98	74,632	39.61
Centrist Reform Alliance				25,432	13.50
Democratic Party For the People	Kai Odake	48,150	25.87	25,655	13.62
Sanseito	Yuichiro Kawa	23,350	12.54	20,320	10.79
Nippon Ishin no Kai	Makoto Kobayashi	19,547	10.50	19,972	10.60
Japanese Communist Party	Shigeru Murata	11,358	6.10	6,993	3.71
Reiwa Shinsengumi				5,046	2.68
Conservative Party of Japan				4,696	2.49
Social Democratic Party				2,287	1.21
Tax Cuts Japan and Yukoku Alliance				2,616	1.39
Consideration the Euthanasia System				751	0.40
Total		186,137	100.00	188,400	100.00
Invalid/blank votes					
Voter turnout			51.79		
Registered voters		370,508		370,508	
LDP hold					

Ishikawa 2nd district
Party	Candidate	Constituency		Proportional	
Party	Candidate	Votes	%	Votes	%
Liberal Democratic Party	Hajime Sasaki	139,808	83.58	81,079	45.92
Centrist Reform Alliance				22,861	12.95
Democratic Party For the People				18,876	10.69
Sanseito				18,287	10.36
Nippon Ishin no Kai				15,401	8.72
Reiwa Shinsengumi				5,383	3.05
Japanese Communist Party	Hiroshi Sakamoto	27,476	16.42	5,202	2.95
Conservative Party of Japan				4,192	2.37
Tax Cuts Japan and Yukoku Alliance				2,539	1.44
Social Democratic Party				1,999	1.13
Consideration the Euthanasia System				730	0.41
Total		167,284	100.00	176,549	100.00
Invalid/blank votes					
Voter turnout			56.33		
Registered voters		320,562		320,562	
LDP hold					

Ishikawa 3rd district
Party	Candidate	Constituency		Proportional	
Party	Candidate	Votes	%	Votes	%
Liberal Democratic Party	Shoji Nishida	73,029	51.88	69,702	50.04
Centrist Reform Alliance	Kazuya Kondo	64,893	46.10	28,892	20.74
Democratic Party For the People				10,265	7.37
Sanseito				9,614	6.90
Nippon Ishin no Kai				8,382	6.02
Reiwa Shinsengumi				4,054	2.91
Japanese Communist Party	Shoji Minami	2,850	2.02	3,117	2.24
Conservative Party of Japan				2,239	1.61
Tax Cuts Japan and Yukoku Alliance				1,465	1.05
Social Democratic Party				1,228	0.88
Consideration the Euthanasia System				328	0.24
Total		140,772	100.00	139,286	100.00
Invalid/blank votes					
Voter turnout			63.54		
Registered voters		224,873		224,873	
LDP gain from CRA					

=== Fukui Prefecture ===
Fukui Prefecture
Party	Constituency			Proportional	
Party	Votes	%	Seats	Votes	%
Liberal Democratic Party	172,029	52.88	2	149,675	45.67
Centrist Reform Alliance	91,536	28.14	0	51,062	15.58
Sanseito	27,189	8.36	0	39,009	11.90
Democratic Party For the People	34,541	10.62	0	51,062	10.01
Nippon Ishin no Kai				24,957	7.62
Reiwa Shinsengumi				7,988	2.44
Japanese Communist Party				7,439	2.27
Conservative Party of Japan				6,987	2.13
Tax Cuts Japan and Yukoku Alliance				3,111	0.95
Social Democratic Party				3,052	0.93
Consideration the Euthanasia System				1,611	0.49
Total	325,295	100.00	2	327,702	100.00
Invalid/blank votes					
Voter turnout					
Registered voters					

Fukui 1st district
Party	Candidate	Constituency		Proportional	
Party	Candidate	Votes	%	Votes	%
Liberal Democratic Party	Tomomi Inada	93,292	48.10	87,520	45.30
Centrist Reform Alliance	Tsubasa Hatano	38,929	20.07	28,506	14.75
Democratic Party For the People	Shunsuke Yamanaka	34,541	17.81	20,417	10.57
Sanseito	Kazumi Fujimoto	27,189	14.02	24,141	12.49
Nippon Ishin no Kai				15,178	7.86
Reiwa Shinsengumi				4,656	2.41
Conservative Party of Japan				4,173	2.16
Japanese Communist Party				4,130	2.14
Tax Cuts Japan and Yukoku Alliance				1,784	0.92
Social Democratic Party				1,738	0.90
Consideration the Euthanasia System				964	0.50
Total		193,951	100.00	193,207	100.00
Invalid/blank votes					
Voter turnout			54.28		
Registered voters		361,873		361,873	
LDP hold					

Fukui 2nd district
Party	Candidate	Constituency		Proportional	
Party	Candidate	Votes	%	Votes	%
Liberal Democratic Party	Takeshi Saiki	78,737	59.95	62,155	46.21
Centrist Reform Alliance	Hideyuki Tsuji	52,607	40.05	22,556	16.77
Sanseito				14,868	11.05
Democratic Party For the People				12,394	9.22
Nippon Ishin no Kai				9,779	7.27
Reiwa Shinsengumi				3,332	2.48
Japanese Communist Party				3,309	2.46
Conservative Party of Japan				2,814	2.09
Tax Cuts Japan and Yukoku Alliance				1,327	0.99
Social Democratic Party				1,314	0.98
Consideration the Euthanasia System				647	0.48
Total		131,344	100.00	134,495	100.00
Invalid/blank votes					
Voter turnout			54.31		
Registered voters		252,020		252,020	
LDP gain from CRA					

=== Nagano Prefecture ===
Nagano Prefecture
Party	Constituency			Proportional	
Party	Votes	%	Seats	Votes	%
Liberal Democratic Party	511,053	51.70	5	362,087	36.56
Centrist Reform Alliance	310,782	31.44	0	226,483	22.87
Democratic Party For the People	34,122	3.45	0	96,736	9.77
Sanseito	44,790	4.53	0	80,642	8.14
Nippon Ishin no Kai	53,780	5.44	0	66,042	6.67
Japanese Communist Party	22,747	2.30	0	65,090	6.57
Reiwa Shinsengumi	11,296	1.14	0	36,496	3.68
Conservative Party of Japan				22,179	2.24
Social Democratic Party				18,245	1.84
Tax Cuts Japan and Yukoku Alliance				12,900	1.30
Consideration the Euthanasia System				3,569	0.36
Total	988,570	100.00	5	990,469	100.00
Invalid/blank votes					
Voter turnout					
Registered voters					

Nagano 1st district
Party	Candidate	Constituency		Proportional	
Party	Candidate	Votes	%	Votes	%
Liberal Democratic Party	Kenta Wakabayashi	119,101	50.70	88,627	37.60
Centrist Reform Alliance	Takashi Shinohara	86,458	36.80	54,157	22.97
Democratic Party For the People				22,300	9.46
Sanseito				17,857	7.58
Nippon Ishin no Kai	Kiyoshi Wakasa	29,366	12.50	17,251	7.32
Japanese Communist Party				14,408	6.11
Reiwa Shinsengumi				7,663	3.25
Conservative Party of Japan				5,709	2.42
Social Democratic Party				4,180	1.77
Tax Cuts Japan and Yukoku Alliance				2,752	1.17
Consideration the Euthanasia System				830	0.35
Total		234,925	100.00	235,734	100.00
Invalid/blank votes					
Voter turnout			58.25		
Registered voters		413,449		413,449	
LDP gain from CRA					

Nagano 2nd district
Party	Candidate	Constituency		Proportional	
Party	Candidate	Votes	%	Votes	%
Liberal Democratic Party	Hikaru Fujita	104,107	46.74	80,653	36.33
Centrist Reform Alliance	Mitsu Shimojo	75,809	34.04	48,719	21.95
Democratic Party For the People				21,062	9.49
Nippon Ishin no Kai	Daisuke Tezuka	24,414	10.96	18,485	8.33
Sanseito	Hiroyoshi Takeshita	18,383	8.25	17,959	8.09
Japanese Communist Party				14,029	6.32
Reiwa Shinsengumi				7,882	3.55
Conservative Party of Japan				4,901	2.21
Social Democratic Party				4,492	2.02
Tax Cuts Japan and Yukoku Alliance				3,059	1.38
Consideration the Euthanasia System				760	0.34
Total		222,713	100.00	222,001	100.00
Invalid/blank votes					
Voter turnout			60.80		
Registered voters		372,655		372,655	
LDP gain from CRA					

Nagano 3rd district
Party	Candidate	Constituency		Proportional	
Party	Candidate	Votes	%	Votes	%
Liberal Democratic Party	Yosei Ide	111,844	48.32	81,202	35.18
Centrist Reform Alliance	Takeshi Kōzu	81,922	35.39	58,568	25.37
Democratic Party For the People				21,228	9.20
Sanseito	Hiroki Nishina	26,407	11.41	20,655	8.95
Japanese Communist Party				14,710	6.37
Nippon Ishin no Kai				11,613	5.03
Reiwa Shinsengumi	Koji Yamaguchi	11,296	4.88	10,019	4.34
Conservative Party of Japan				5,363	2.32
Social Democratic Party				3,691	1.60
Tax Cuts Japan and Yukoku Alliance				2,959	1.28
Consideration the Euthanasia System				929	0.36
Total		231,469	100.00	230,836	100.00
Invalid/blank votes					
Voter turnout			60.44		
Registered voters		390,068		390,068	
LDP gain from CRA					

Nagano 4th district
Party	Candidate	Constituency		Proportional	
Party	Candidate	Votes	%	Votes	%
Liberal Democratic Party	Shigeyuki Goto	77,135	57.56	49,445	36.52
Centrist Reform Alliance				26,304	19.43
Democratic Party For the People	Akihisa Hanaoka	34,122	25.46	16,107	11.90
Sanseito				10,997	8.12
Japanese Communist Party	Ryosuke Takeda	22,747	16.97	10,362	7.65
Nippon Ishin no Kai				8,897	6.57
Reiwa Shinsengumi				4,947	3.65
Conservative Party of Japan				3,070	2.27
Social Democratic Party				2,770	2.05
Tax Cuts Japan and Yukoku Alliance				1,929	1.42
Consideration the Euthanasia System				550	0.41
Total		134,004	100.00	135,378	100.00
Invalid/blank votes					
Voter turnout			59.53		
Registered voters		232,782		232,782	
LDP hold					

Nagano 5th district
Party	Candidate	Constituency		Proportional	
Party	Candidate	Votes	%	Votes	%
Liberal Democratic Party	Ichiro Miyashita	98,866	59.75	62,160	37.33
Centrist Reform Alliance	Junta Fukuda	66,593	40.25	38,735	23.26
Democratic Party For the People				16,039	9.63
Sanseito				13,174	7.91
Japanese Communist Party				11,581	6.95
Nippon Ishin no Kai				9,796	5.88
Reiwa Shinsengumi				5,985	3.59
Conservative Party of Japan				3,136	1.88
Social Democratic Party				3,112	1.87
Tax Cuts Japan and Yukoku Alliance				2,201	1.32
Consideration the Euthanasia System				601	0.36
Total		165,459	100.00	166,520	100.00
Invalid/blank votes					
Voter turnout			63.34		
Registered voters		269,491		269,491	
LDP hold					

== Proportional representation ==
Proportional representation results
Party	Votes	Seats	Rank	Elected member	Constituency	Ratio
LDP	1,387,716 (42.1%)	5 → 3 (Note: Forfeited two seats due to lack of candidates.)	12	Hiroaki Tabata		
LDP	1,387,716 (42.1%)	5 → 3	19	Kon Yosuke		
LDP	1,387,716 (42.1%)	5 → 3	20	Kosuke Furui		
CRA	651,331 (19.8%)	2 → 4	1	Hiromasa Nakagawa		
CRA	651,331 (19.8%)	2 → 4	2	Kazuya Kondo	Ishikawa 3rd	88.8%
CRA	651,331 (19.8%)	2 → 4	2	Chinami Nishimura	Niigata 1st	79.0%
CRA	651,331 (19.8%)	2 → 4	2	Makiko Kikuta	Niigata 2nd	76.5%
DPFP	322,739 (9.8%)	1	1	Kai Odake	Ishikawa 1st	57.5%
Sansei	285,897 (8.7%)	1	1	Yuichiro Kawa	Ishikawa 1st	27.8%
Ishin	231,686 (7.0%)	1	1	Kiyoshi Wakasa	Nagano 1st	24.6%

Liberal Democratic Party 1,387,716 (42.09%) 5 seats (2 unfilled)
Rank	Candidate	Constituency	Ratio
1	Isato Kunisada	Niigata 2nd	Won
1	Hiroaki Saito	Niigata 3rd	Won
1	Eishun Ueda	Toyama 2nd	Won
1	Keiichiro Tachibana	Toyama 3rd	Won
1	Takuo Komori	Ishikawa 1st	Won
1	Hajime Sasaki	Ishikawa 2nd	Won
1	Shoji Nishida	Ishikawa 3rd	Won
1	Tomomi Inada	Fukui 1st	Won
1	Yosei Ide	Nagano 3rd	Won
1	Shigeyuki Goto	Nagano 4th	Won
1	Ichiro Miyashita	Nagano 5th	Won
12	Hiroaki Tabata		
13	Kou Uchiyama	Niigata 1st	Won
13	Eiichiro Washio	Niigata 4th	Won
13	Shuichi Takatori	Niigata 5th	Won
13	Hiroshi Nakada	Toyama 1st	Won
13	Kenta Wakabayashi	Nagano 1st	Won
13	Hikaru Fujita	Nagano 2nd	Won
19	Kon Yosuke		
20	Kosuke Furui		

Centrist Reform Alliance 651,331 (19.76%) 2 seats (plus 2)
Rank	Candidate	Constituency	Ratio
1	Hiromasa Nakagawa		
2	Kazuya Kondo	Ishikawa 3rd	88.8
2	Chinami Nishimura	Niigata 1st	79.0
2	Makiko Kikuta	Niigata 2nd	76.5
2	Mamoru Umetani	Niigata 5th	76.0
2	Takeshi Kōzu	Nagano 3rd	73.2
2	Mitsu Shimojo	Nagano 2nd	72.8
2	Takashi Shinohara	Nagano 1st	72.5
2	Junta Fukuda	Nagano 5th	67.3
2	Hideyuki Tsuji	Fukui 2nd	66.8
2	Takahiro Kuroiwa	Niigata 3rd	65.9
2	Ryuichi Yoneyama	Niigata 4th	58.2
2	Tsubasa Hatano	Fukui 1st	41.7
2	Yasuharu Koshikawa	Toyama 2nd	33.8
2	Toshihiro Yama	Toyama 1st	33.8

Democratic Party For the People 322,739 (9.79%) 1 seat
Rank	Candidate	Constituency	Ratio
1	Kai Odake	Ishikawa 1st	57.5
1	Akihisa Hanaoka	Nagano 4th	44.2
1	Shunsuke Yamanaka	Fukui 1st	37.0
1	Keita Yamamoto	Toyama 3rd	28.0
1	~~Taiki Nomura~~ (Note: Ineligible for election - failed to surpass the required 10% of votes in their single-member constituency race.)	Niigata 4th	14.8

Sanseito 285,897 (8.67%) 1 seat
Rank	Candidate	Constituency	Ratio
1	Yuichiro Kawa	Ishikawa 1st	27.8
2	Kazumi Fujimoto	Fukui 1st	29.1
3	Takumi Saito	Toyama 1st	17.3
4	Katsuhito Takaiwa		

Nippon Ishin no Kai 231,686 (7.03%) 1 seat
Rank	Candidate	Constituency	Ratio
1	Kiyoshi Wakasa	Nagano 1st	24.6
1	Daisuke Tezuka	Nagano 2nd	23.4
1	Makoto Kobayashi	Ishikawa 1st	23.3
1	~~Kazunari Ito~~	Niigata 1st	10.9
1	~~Noriko Kanai~~	Niigata 2nd	8.3

Japanese Communist Party 140,311 (4.26%) 0 seats
Rank	Candidate	Constituency	Ratio
1	Yasufumi Fujino		
2	Ayako Taira		

Reiwa Shinsengumi 100,497 (3.05%) 0 seats
Rank	Candidate	Constituency	Ratio
1	Tooru Hasuike		

Conservative Party of Japan 73,566 (2.23%) 0 seats
Rank	Candidate	Constituency	Ratio
1	Takao Miida		

Social Democratic Party 50,017 (1.52%) 0 seats
Rank	Candidate	Constituency	Ratio
1	Yuuko Isoda		

Tax Cuts Japan and Yukoku Alliance 40,094 (1.22%) 0 seats
Rank	Candidate	Constituency	Ratio
1	Yukio Saito		

Consideration the Euthanasia System 13,014 (0.39%) 0 seats
Rank	Candidate	Constituency	Ratio
1	Hidemitsu Sano		
2	Tadao Takahashi		
