= List of members of the House of Representatives of Japan (2024-2026) =

This is a list of members of the House of Representatives of Japan, largely elected in the 2024 Japanese general election to serve in the House of Representatives, Japan's Lower House, until the 2026 Japanese general election. The House of Representatives consists of 465 seats, 289 in single-seat constituencies and 176 in a proportional representation block.

== Term of Office ==
Members of the House of Representatives have a four-year term, but if the House of Representatives is dissolved, they will lose their seats immediately, before the end of their term. Since World War II, their terms have been completed on only one occasion, in 1976. When the term of office expires or the House of Representatives is dissolved, a general election will be held. In addition, by-elections will be held in April or October if there are vacancies for single-seat constituencies.

Current term
Term start	Term end	Note
27 October 2024	23 January 2026	Members were elected in the 2024 Japanese general election.

== Parliamentary Group ==
As of 9 October 2024.

Office	Member	Party	Born	Constituency
Speaker	Fukushiro Nukaga	LDP	January 11, 1944 (age 82)	Ibaraki 2nd
Vice Speaker	Kōichirō Genba	CDP	May 20, 1964 (age 62)	Fukushima 2nd

Party		Seats	
Government		233	
Liberal Democrats and Independents	LDP	196	199
Liberal Democrats and Independents	Independent	3	199
Nippon Ishin no Kai	Ishin	34	34
Opposition		226	
Constitutional Democrats	CDP	147	148
Constitutional Democrats	SDP	1	148
DPP and Independents club	DPP	27	27
Komeito	Komeito	24	24
Reiwa Shinsengumi	Reiwa	9	9
Japanese Communist Party	JCP	8	8
Yūshi no Kai	Independent	4	4
Sanseitō	Sanseitō	3	3
Genzei Hosyu Kodomo	Genzei Nippon	3	3
Unaffiliated		6	
Speaker and Vice Speaker	Speaker	1	2
Speaker and Vice Speaker	Vice Speaker	1	2
Independents	Independent	4	4
Vacant		0	
Vacant		0	0
Total		465	

== Vacancies ==
No vacant seats.

== Members ==
=== Hokkaido block ===
Members by single-member constituencies

Constituency	Member	Party	Born	Note
Hokkaido 1st	Daiki Michishita	CDP	December 24, 1975 (age 50)	
Hokkaido 2nd	Kenko Matsuki	CDP	February 22, 1959 (age 67)	
Hokkaido 3rd	Yutaka Arai	CDP	February 28, 1975 (age 51)	
Hokkaido 4th	Kureha Ōtsuki	CDP	October 16, 1983 (age 42)	
Hokkaido 5th	Maki Ikeda	CDP	May 24, 1972 (age 54)	
Hokkaido 6th	Kuniyoshi Azuma	LDP	February 17, 1968 (age 58)	
Hokkaido 7th	Takako Suzuki	LDP	January 5, 1986 (age 40)	
Hokkaido 8th	Seiji Osaka	CDP	April 24, 1959 (age 67)	
Hokkaido 9th	Tatsumaru Yamaoka	CDP	July 22, 1979 (age 47)	
Hokkaido 10th	Hiroshi Kamiya	CDP	August 10, 1968 (age 58)	
Hokkaido 11th	Kaori Ishikawa	CDP	May 10, 1984 (age 42)	
Hokkaido 12th	Arata Takebe	LDP	July 20, 1970 (age 56)	

Members by Proportional Representation block

Party	Member	Born	Constituency	Note
CDP	Naoko Shinoda	February 5, 1972 (age 54)	Hokkaido 7th	
CDP	Masahito Nishikawa	November 7, 1968 (age 57)	Hokkaido 6th	
CDP	Eisei Kawaharada	January 12, 1983 (age 43)	Hokkaido 12th	
LDP	Yoshitaka Itō	November 24, 1948 (age 77)	PR only	
LDP	Hiroyuki Nakamura	February 23, 1961 (age 65)	Hokkaido 4th	
LDP	Jun Mukōyama	November 19, 1983 (age 42)	Hokkaido 8th	
Komeito	Hidemichi Sato	September 26, 1960 (age 65)	PR only	
DPP	Hidetake Usuki	March 28, 1981 (age 45)	PR only	

=== Tohoku block ===
Members by single-member constituencies

Constituency	Member	Party	Born	Note
Akita 1st	Hiroyuki Togashi	LDP	April 27, 1955 (age 71)	
Akita 2nd	Takashi Midorikawa	CDP	January 10, 1985 (age 41)	
Akita 3rd	Toshihide Muraoka	DPP	July 25, 1960 (age 66)	
Aomori 1st	Jun Tsushima	LDP	October 18, 1966 (age 59)	
Aomori 2nd	Junichi Kanda	LDP	September 27, 1970 (age 55)	
Aomori 3rd	Hanako Okada	CDP	August 2, 1980 (age 46)	
Fukushima 1st	Emi Kaneko	CDP	July 7, 1965 (age 61)	
Fukushima 2nd	Kōichirō Genba	CDP	May 20, 1964 (age 62)	
Fukushima 3rd	Shinji Oguma	CDP	June 16, 1968 (age 58)	
Fukushima 4th	Ryutaro Sakamoto	LDP	March 28, 1980 (age 46)	
Iwate 1st	Takeshi Shina	CDP	October 7, 1966 (age 59)	
Iwate 2nd	Shunichi Suzuki	LDP	April 13, 1953 (age 73)	
Iwate 3rd	Ichirō Ozawa	CDP	May 24, 1942 (age 84)	
Miyagi 1st	Akiko Okamoto	CDP	August 16, 1964 (age 62)	
Miyagi 2nd	Sayuri Kamata	CDP	January 8, 1965 (age 61)	
Miyagi 3rd	Tsuyoshi Yanagisawa	CDP	August 18, 1963 (age 63)	
Miyagi 4th	Jun Azumi	CDP	January 17, 1962 (age 64)	
Miyagi 5th	Itsunori Onodera	LDP	May 5, 1960 (age 66)	
Yamagata 1st	Toshiaki Endo	LDP	January 17, 1950 (age 76)	
Yamagata 2nd	Norikazu Suzuki	LDP	January 30, 1982 (age 44)	
Yamagata 3rd	Ayuko Kato	LDP	April 19, 1979 (age 47)	

Members by Proportional Representation block

Party	Member	Born	Constituency	Note
LDP	Akinori Eto	October 12, 1955 (age 70)	PR only	
LDP	Chisato Morishita	September 1, 1981 (age 44)	PR only	
LDP	Junji Fukuhara	December 18, 1967 (age 58)	Akita 2nd	
LDP	Nobuhide Minorikawa	May 25, 1964 (age 62)	Akita 3rd	
LDP	Taku Nemoto	September 11, 1986 (age 39)	Fukushima 2nd	
CDP	Yuki Baba	October 15, 1992 (age 33)	PR only	
CDP	Manabu Terata	September 20, 1976 (age 49)	Akita 1st	
CDP	Sekio Masuta	June 5, 1957 (age 69)	Aomori 1st	
CDP	Yuki Saito	September 4, 1979 (age 46)	Fukushima 4th	
DPP	Daijiro Kikuchi	July 9, 1982 (age 44)	Yamagata 2nd	
Komeito	Kenichi Shoji	February 8, 1963 (age 63)	PR only	
Reiwa	Wakako Sawara	November 22, 1953 (age 72)	PR only	

=== Northern-Kanto block ===
Members by single-member constituencies

Constituency	Member	Party	Born	Note
Gunma 1st	Yasutaka Nakasone	LDP	January 19, 1982 (age 44)	
Gunma 2nd	Toshiro Ino	LDP	January 8, 1980 (age 46)	
Gunma 3rd	Hiroyoshi Sasagawa	LDP	August 29, 1966 (age 59)	
Gunma 4th	Tatsuo Fukuda	LDP	March 5, 1967 (age 59)	
Gunma 5th	Yūko Obuchi	LDP	December 11, 1973 (age 52)	
Ibaraki 1st	Nobuyuki Fukushima	Independent	August 8, 1970 (age 56)	Fukushima belongs to "Yūshi no Kai".
Ibaraki 2nd	Fukushiro Nukaga	LDP	January 11, 1944 (age 82)	Speaker of the House of Representatives.
Ibaraki 3rd	Yasuhiro Hanashi	LDP	October 12, 1959 (age 66)	
Ibaraki 4th	Hiroshi Kajiyama	LDP	October 18, 1955 (age 70)	
Ibaraki 5th	Satoshi Asano	DPP	September 25, 1982 (age 43)	
Ibaraki 6th	Yamato Aoyama	CDP	January 24, 1979 (age 47)	
Ibaraki 7th	Hayato Nakamura	Independent	October 18, 1986 (age 39)	
Saitama 1st	Hideki Murai	LDP	May 14, 1980 (age 46)	
Saitama 2nd	Yoshitaka Shindō	LDP	January 20, 1958 (age 68)	
Saitama 3rd	Hitoshi Kikawada	LDP	October 13, 1970 (age 55)	
Saitama 4th	Yasushi Hosaka	LDP	February 17, 1974 (age 52)	
Saitama 5th	Yukio Edano	CDP	May 31, 1964 (age 62)	
Saitama 6th	Atsushi Oshima	CDP	December 21, 1956 (age 69)	
Saitama 7th	Yasuko Komiyama	CDP	April 25, 1965 (age 61)	
Saitama 8th	Masahiko Shibayama	LDP	December 5, 1965 (age 60)	
Saitama 9th	Shinji Sugimura	CDP	June 15, 1976 (age 50)	
Saitama 10th	Yūnosuke Sakamoto	CDP	January 30, 1955 (age 71)	
Saitama 11th	Ryuji Koizumi	LDP	September 17, 1952 (age 73)	Minister of Defense.
Saitama 12th	Toshikazu Morita	CDP	September 19, 1974 (age 51)	
Saitama 13th	Mikihiko Hashimoto	DPP	December 27, 1995 (age 30)	
Saitama 14th	Yoshihiro Suzuki	DPP	November 10, 1962 (age 63)	
Saitama 15th	Ryosei Tanaka	LDP	November 11, 1963 (age 62)	
Saitama 16th	Shinako Tsuchiya	LDP	February 9, 1952 (age 74)	
Tochigi 1st	Hajime Funada	LDP	November 22, 1953 (age 72)	
Tochigi 2nd	Akio Fukuda	CDP	April 17, 1948 (age 78)	
Tochigi 3rd	Kazuo Yana	LDP	April 22, 1979 (age 47)	
Tochigi 4th	Takao Fujioka	CDP	March 28, 1977 (age 49)	
Tochigi 5th	Toshimitsu Motegi	LDP	October 7, 1955 (age 70)	

Members by Proportional Representation block

Party	Member	Born	Constituency	Note
LDP	Hideyuki Nakano	September 6, 1961 (age 64)	Saitama 7th	
LDP	Ayano Kunimitsu	March 20, 1979 (age 47)	Ibaraki 6th	
LDP	Keiko Nagaoka	December 8, 1953 (age 72)	Ibaraki 7th	
LDP	Yoshinori Tadokoro	January 19, 1954 (age 72)	Ibaraki 1st	
LDP	Tsutomu Sato	June 20, 1952 (age 74)	Tochigi 4th	
LDP	Kiyoshi Igarashi	December 14, 1969 (age 56)	Tochigi 2nd	
LDP	Atsushi Nonaka	November 17, 1976 (age 49)	Saitama 12th	
CDP	Kaichi Hasegawa	November 6, 1952 (age 73)	Gunma 3rd	
CDP	Koichi Takemasa	March 23, 1961 (age 65)	Saitama 1st	
CDP	Sota Misumi	December 16, 1987 (age 38)	Saitama 16th	
CDP	Chiharu Takeuchi	July 4, 1968 (age 58)	Saitama 3rd	
CDP	Tomoko Ichiki	August 2, 1977 (age 49)	Saitama 8th	
DPP	Mitsuhiro Kishida	February 26, 1967 (age 59)	Saitama 4th	
Komeito	Keiichi Koshimizu	February 4, 1962 (age 64)	PR only	
Komeito	Takahiro Fukushige	May 3, 1962 (age 64)	PR only	
Komeito	Ryoji Yamaguchi	January 16, 1980 (age 46)	PR only	
Reiwa	Takashi Takai	September 26, 1969 (age 56)	Saitama 13th	
Ishin	Hideaki Takahashi	May 10, 1963 (age 63)	Saitama 2nd	
JCP	Tetsuya Shiokawa	December 18, 1961 (age 64)	PR only	

=== Southern-Kanto block ===
Members by single-member constituencies

Constituency	Member	Party	Born	Note
Chiba 1st	Kaname Tajima	CDP	September 22, 1961 (age 64)	
Chiba 2nd	Takayuki Kobayashi	LDP	November 29, 1974 (age 51)	
Chiba 3rd	Hirokazu Matsuno	LDP	September 13, 1962 (age 63)	
Chiba 4th	Hideyuki Mizunuma	CDP	June 28, 1990 (age 36)	
Chiba 5th	Kentaro Yazaki	CDP	September 29, 1967 (age 58)	
Chiba 6th	Junko Ando	CDP	May 29, 1976 (age 50)	
Chiba 7th	Ken Saitō	LDP	June 14, 1959 (age 67)	
Chiba 8th	Satoshi Honjo	CDP	October 22, 1974 (age 51)	
Chiba 9th	Soichiro Okuno	CDP	July 15, 1964 (age 62)	
Chiba 10th	Masaaki Koike	LDP	September 18, 1966 (age 59)	
Chiba 11th	Eisuke Mori	LDP	August 31, 1948 (age 77)	
Chiba 12th	Yasukazu Hamada	LDP	October 21, 1955 (age 70)	
Chiba 13th	Hisashi Matsumoto	LDP	June 3, 1962 (age 64)	
Chiba 14th	Yoshihiko Noda	CDP	May 20, 1957 (age 69)	
Kanagawa 1st	Go Shinohara	CDP	February 12, 1975 (age 51)	
Kanagawa 2nd	Yoshihide Suga	LDP	December 6, 1948 (age 77)	
Kanagawa 3rd	Kenji Nakanishi	LDP	January 4, 1964 (age 62)	
Kanagawa 4th	Yuki Waseda	CDP	December 6, 1958 (age 67)	
Kanagawa 5th	Manabu Sakai	LDP	September 4, 1965 (age 60)	
Kanagawa 6th	Yoichiro Aoyagi	CDP	August 29, 1969 (age 56)	
Kanagawa 7th	Kazuma Nakatani	CDP	August 30, 1983 (age 42)	
Kanagawa 8th	Kenji Eda	CDP	April 28, 1956 (age 70)	
Kanagawa 9th	Hirofumi Ryu	CDP	January 3, 1965 (age 61)	
Kanagawa 10th	Kazunori Tanaka	LDP	January 21, 1949 (age 77)	
Kanagawa 11th	Shinjirō Koizumi	LDP	April 14, 1981 (age 45)	
Kanagawa 12th	Tomoko Abe	CDP	April 24, 1948 (age 78)	
Kanagawa 13th	Hideshi Futori	CDP	April 27, 1977 (age 49)	
Kanagawa 14th	Jiro Akama	LDP	March 27, 1968 (age 58)	
Kanagawa 15th	Taro Kono	LDP	January 10, 1963 (age 63)	
Kanagawa 16th	Yuichi Goto	CDP	March 25, 1969 (age 57)	
Kanagawa 17th	Karen Makishima	LDP	November 1, 1976 (age 49)	
Kanagawa 18th	Hajime Sono	CDP	January 5, 1993 (age 33)	
Kanagawa 19th	Tsuyoshi Kusama	LDP	January 16, 1982 (age 44)	
Kanagawa 20th	Sayuri Otsuka	CDP	January 6, 1980 (age 46)	
Yamanashi 1st	Katsuhito Nakajima	CDP	September 27, 1967 (age 58)	
Yamanashi 2nd	Noriko Horiuchi	LDP	October 28, 1965 (age 60)	

Members by Proportional Representation block

Party	Member	Born	Constituency	Note
LDP	Naoki Furukawa	August 31, 1968 (age 57)	Kanagawa 6th	
LDP	Shinichi Nakatani	September 30, 1976 (age 49)	Yamanashi 1st	
LDP	Arfiya Eri	October 16, 1988 (age 37)	Chiba 5th	
LDP	Keisuke Suzuki	February 9, 1977 (age 49)	Kanagawa 7th	Minister of Justice.
LDP	Hidehiro Mitani	June 28, 1976 (age 50)	Kanagawa 8th	
LDP	Tsuyoshi Hoshino	August 8, 1963 (age 63)	Kanagawa 12th	
LDP	Daishiro Yamagiwa	September 12, 1968 (age 57)	Kanagawa 18th	
CDP	Hajime Yatagawa	January 17, 1963 (age 63)	Chiba 10th	
CDP	Naomi Sasaki	September 28, 1969 (age 56)	Kanagawa 17th	
CDP	Shin Miyakawa	June 29, 1970 (age 56)	Chiba 13th	
CDP	Kazumasa Okajima	November 3, 1957 (age 68)	Chiba 3rd	
CDP	Yoshihiro Nagatomo	December 29, 1970 (age 55)	Kanagawa 14th	
CDP	Makoto Yamazaki	November 22, 1962 (age 63)	Kanagawa 5th	
DPP	Jesús Fukasaku	January 4, 1985 (age 41)	Kanagawa 19th	
DPP	Junko Okano	June 10, 1978 (age 48)	Chiba 5th	
DPP	Yoshitaka Nishioka	May 4, 1977 (age 49)	Kanagawa 18th	
Komeito	Hideo Tsunoda	March 25, 1961 (age 65)	PR only	
Komeito	Mitsuko Numazaki	February 24, 1973 (age 53)	PR only	
Ishin	Ryuna Kanemura	April 6, 1979 (age 47)	Kanagawa 10th	
Ishin	Kenta Fujimaki	October 7, 1983 (age 42)	Chiba 6th	
Reiwa	Ryo Tagaya	November 25, 1968 (age 57)	Chiba 11th	
JCP	Kazuo Shii	July 29, 1954 (age 72)	PR only	
Sanseitō	Atsushi Suzuki	December 15, 1988 (age 37)	PR only	

=== Tokyo block ===
Members by single-member constituencies

Constituency	Member	Party	Born	Note
Tokyo 1st	Banri Kaieda	CDP	February 26, 1949 (age 77)	
Tokyo 2nd	Kiyoto Tsuji	LDP	September 7, 1979 (age 46)	
Tokyo 3rd	Hirotaka Ishihara	LDP	June 19, 1964 (age 62)	
Tokyo 4th	Masaaki Taira	LDP	February 21, 1967 (age 59)	Minister for Digital Transformation.
Tokyo 5th	Yoshio Tezuka	CDP	September 14, 1966 (age 59)	
Tokyo 6th	Takayuki Ochiai	CDP	August 17, 1979 (age 47)	
Tokyo 7th	Akihiro Matsuo	CDP	January 25, 1975 (age 51)	
Tokyo 8th	Harumi Yoshida	CDP	January 1, 1972 (age 54)	
Tokyo 9th	Issei Yamagishi	CDP	August 28, 1981 (age 44)	
Tokyo 10th	Hayato Suzuki	LDP	August 8, 1977 (age 49)	
Tokyo 11th	Yukihiko Akutsu	CDP	June 26, 1956 (age 70)	
Tokyo 12th	Kei Takagi	LDP	March 16, 1965 (age 61)	
Tokyo 13th	Shin Tsuchida	LDP	October 30, 1990 (age 35)	
Tokyo 14th	Midori Matsushima	LDP	July 15, 1956 (age 70)	
Tokyo 15th	Natsumi Sakai	CDP	July 24, 1986 (age 40)	
Tokyo 16th	Yohei Onishi	LDP	January 12, 1978 (age 48)	
Tokyo 17th	Katsuei Hirasawa	Independent	September 4, 1945 (age 80)	
Tokyo 18th	Kaoru Fukuda	LDP	May 10, 1985 (age 41)	
Tokyo 19th	Yoshinori Suematsu	CDP	December 5, 1956 (age 69)	
Tokyo 20th	Seiji Kihara	LDP	June 8, 1970 (age 56)	
Tokyo 21st	Masako Ōkawara	CDP	April 8, 1953 (age 73)	
Tokyo 22nd	Ikuo Yamahana	CDP	January 18, 1967 (age 59)	
Tokyo 23rd	Shunsuke Ito	CDP	August 5, 1979 (age 47)	
Tokyo 24th	Kōichi Hagiuda	Independent	August 31, 1963 (age 62)	
Tokyo 25th	Shinji Inoue	LDP	October 7, 1969 (age 56)	
Tokyo 26th	Jin Matsubara	Independent	July 31, 1956 (age 70)	
Tokyo 27th	Akira Nagatsuma	CDP	June 14, 1960 (age 66)	
Tokyo 28th	Satoshi Takamatsu	CDP	July 26, 1974 (age 52)	
Tokyo 29th	Mitsunari Okamoto	Komeito	May 5, 1965 (age 61)	
Tokyo 30th	Eri Igarashi	CDP	January 19, 1984 (age 42)	

Members by Proportional Representation block

Party	Member	Born	Constituency	Note
LDP	Takao Ando	April 1, 1959 (age 67)	Tokyo 28th	
LDP	Tatsuya Ito	July 6, 1961 (age 65)	Tokyo 22nd	
LDP	Yohei Matsumoto	August 31, 1973 (age 52)	Tokyo 19th	
LDP	Kōki Ōzora	November 26, 1998 (age 27)	Tokyo 15th	
LDP	Akihisa Nagashima	February 17, 1962 (age 64)	Tokyo 30th	
CDP	Yosuke Suzuki	November 21, 1975 (age 50)	Tokyo 10th	
CDP	Reiko Matsushita	September 26, 1970 (age 55)	Tokyo 18th	
CDP	Yoshifu Arita	February 20, 1952 (age 74)	Tokyo 24th	
CDP	Yumiko Abe	September 30, 1964 (age 61)	Tokyo 3rd	
CDP	Katsuyuki Shibata	October 24, 1968 (age 57)	Tokyo 16th	
DPP	Yoriko Madoka	February 10, 1947 (age 79)	Tokyo 17th	
DPP	Yosuke Mori	July 15, 1994 (age 32)	Tokyo 13th	
DPP	Kiichiro Hatoyama	July 26, 1976 (age 50)	Tokyo 2nd	
Komeito	Koichi Kasai	June 25, 1979 (age 47)	PR only	
Komeito	Eriko Ōmori	May 16, 1973 (age 53)	PR only	
Ishin	Tsukasa Abe	June 18, 1982 (age 44)	Tokyo 12th	
Ishin	Sachiko Inokuchi	July 14, 1956 (age 70)	Tokyo 17th	
JCP	Tomoko Tamura	July 4, 1965 (age 61)	PR only	
Reiwa	Mari Kushibuchi	October 15, 1967 (age 58)	Tokyo 14th	

=== Hokuriku-Shinetsu block ===
Members by single-member constituencies

Constituency	Member	Party	Born	Note
Fukui 1st	Tomomi Inada	LDP	February 20, 1959 (age 67)	
Fukui 2nd	Hideyuki Tsuji	CDP	May 8, 1970 (age 56)	
Ishikawa 1st	Takuo Komori	LDP	May 21, 1970 (age 56)	
Ishikawa 2nd	Hajime Sasaki	LDP	October 18, 1974 (age 51)	
Ishikawa 3rd	Kazuya Kondo	CDP	December 12, 1973 (age 52)	
Nagano 1st	Takashi Shinohara	CDP	July 17, 1948 (age 78)	
Nagano 2nd	Mitsu Shimojo	CDP	December 29, 1955 (age 70)	
Nagano 3rd	Takeshi Kozu	CDP	January 21, 1977 (age 49)	
Nagano 4th	Shigeyuki Goto	LDP	December 9, 1955 (age 70)	
Nagano 5th	Ichiro Miyashita	LDP	August 1, 1958 (age 68)	
Niigata 1st	Chinami Nishimura	CDP	January 13, 1967 (age 59)	
Niigata 2nd	Makiko Kikuta	CDP	October 24, 1969 (age 56)	
Niigata 3rd	Takahiro Kuroiwa	CDP	October 13, 1966 (age 59)	
Niigata 4th	Ryuichi Yoneyama	CDP	September 8, 1967 (age 58)	
Niigata 5th	Mamoru Umetani	CDP	December 9, 1973 (age 52)	
Toyama 1st	Hiroaki Tabata	LDP	January 2, 1973 (age 53)	
Toyama 2nd	Eishun Ueda	LDP	January 22, 1965 (age 61)	
Toyama 3rd	Keiichiro Tachibana	LDP	January 23, 1961 (age 65)	

Members by Proportional Representation block

Party	Member	Born	Constituency	Note
LDP	Isato Kunisada	August 30, 1972 (age 53)	PR only	
LDP	Hiroaki Saito	December 8, 1976 (age 49)	Niigata 3rd	
LDP	Yosei Ide	November 21, 1977 (age 48)	Nagano 3rd	
LDP	Shoji Nishida	May 1, 1969 (age 57)	Ishikawa 3rd	
CDP	Toshihiro Yama	December 30, 1979 (age 46)	Toyama 1st	
CDP	Junta Fukuda	November 3, 1993 (age 32)	Nagano 5th	
CDP	Tsubasa Hatano	November 6, 1984 (age 41)	Fukui 1st	
DPP	Kai Odake	May 17, 1998 (age 28)	Ishikawa 1st	
Komeito	Hiromasa Nakagawa	July 15, 1970 (age 56)	PR only	
Ishin	Takeshi Saiki	May 13, 1974 (age 52)	Fukui 2nd	

=== Tōkai block ===
Members by single-member constituencies

Constituency	Member	Party	Born	Note
Aichi 1st	Takashi Kawamura	CPJ	November 3, 1948 (age 77)	
Aichi 2nd	Motohisa Furukawa	DPP	December 6, 1965 (age 60)	
Aichi 3rd	Shoichi Kondo	CDP	May 26, 1958 (age 68)	
Aichi 4th	Yoshio Maki	CDP	January 14, 1958 (age 68)	
Aichi 5th	Atsushi Nishikawa	CDP	May 20, 1969 (age 57)	
Aichi 6th	Hideki Niwa	LDP	December 20, 1972 (age 53)	
Aichi 7th	Saria Hino	DPP	November 26, 1987 (age 38)	
Aichi 8th	Yutaka Banno	CDP	January 1, 1961 (age 65)	
Aichi 9th	Mitsunori Okamoto	CDP	June 18, 1971 (age 55)	
Aichi 10th	Norimasa Fujiwara	CDP	April 3, 1978 (age 48)	
Aichi 11th	Midori Tanno	DPP	July 3, 1973 (age 53)	
Aichi 12th	Kazuhiko Shigetoku	CDP	December 21, 1970 (age 55)	Chairman of the CDP’s Policy Bureau.
Aichi 13th	Kensuke Onishi	CDP	April 13, 1971 (age 55)	
Aichi 14th	Soichiro Imaeda	LDP	February 18, 1984 (age 42)	
Aichi 15th	Yukinori Nemoto	LDP	February 21, 1965 (age 61)	
Aichi 16th	Toru Fukuta	DPP	June 2, 1982 (age 44)	
Gifu 1st	Seiko Noda	LDP	September 3, 1960 (age 65)	
Gifu 2nd	Yasufumi Tanahashi	LDP	February 11, 1963 (age 63)	
Gifu 3rd	Yoji Muto	LDP	October 18, 1955 (age 70)	Minister of Economy, Trade and Industry.
Gifu 4th	Masato Imai	CDP	February 21, 1962 (age 64)	
Gifu 5th	Keiji Furuya	LDP	November 1, 1952 (age 73)	
Mie 1st	Norihisa Tamura	LDP	December 15, 1964 (age 61)	
Mie 2nd	Kosuke Shimono	CDP	November 7, 1976 (age 49)	
Mie 3rd	Katsuya Okada	CDP	July 14, 1953 (age 73)	
Mie 4th	Eikei Suzuki	LDP	August 15, 1974 (age 52)	
Shizuoka 1st	Yōko Kamikawa	LDP	March 1, 1953 (age 73)	
Shizuoka 2nd	Tatsunori Ibayashi	LDP	July 18, 1976 (age 50)	
Shizuoka 3rd	Nobuhiro Koyama	CDP	December 26, 1975 (age 50)	
Shizuoka 4th	Ken Tanaka	DPP	July 18, 1977 (age 49)	
Shizuoka 5th	Goshi Hosono	LDP	August 21, 1971 (age 55)	
Shizuoka 6th	Shu Watanabe	CDP	December 11, 1961 (age 64)	
Shizuoka 7th	Minoru Kiuchi	LDP	April 19, 1965 (age 61)	Minister of State for Economic Security.
Shizuoka 8th	Kentaro Genma	CDP	December 21, 1972 (age 53)	

Members by Proportional Representation block

Party	Member	Born	Constituency	Note
LDP	Shinji Wakayama	July 15, 1973 (age 53)	Aichi 10th	
LDP	Yoichi Fukazawa	June 21, 1976 (age 50)	Shizuoka 4th	
LDP	Takaaki Katsumata	April 7, 1976 (age 50)	Shizuoka 6th	
LDP	Hideto Kawasaki	November 4, 1981 (age 44)	Mie 2nd	
LDP	Yasumasa Nagasaka	April 10, 1957 (age 69)	Aichi 9th	
LDP	Shozo Kudo	December 8, 1964 (age 61)	Aichi 4th	
LDP	Tadahiko Ito	January 11, 1964 (age 62)	Aichi 8th	Minister of Reconstruction.
CDP	Isao Matsuda	January 24, 1968 (age 58)	Aichi 16th	
CDP	Satoshi Mano	June 14, 1961 (age 65)	Gifu 5th	
CDP	Rie Otake	August 15, 1977 (age 49)	Aichi 14th	
CDP	Takeyuki Suzuki	May 7, 1973 (age 53)	Shizuoka 2nd	
CDP	Chiho Koyama	April 14, 1975 (age 51)	Aichi 15th	
CDP	Wakako Fukumori	January 6, 1970 (age 56)	Mie 1st	
DPP	Akihiro Senda	October 11, 1982 (age 43)	Gifu 3rd	
Komeito	Yasuhiro Nakagawa	February 12, 1968 (age 58)	PR only	
Komeito	Katsuhide Nishizono	February 1, 1968 (age 58)	PR only	
Reiwa	Naoto Sakaguchi	June 12, 1963 (age 63)	Gifu 3rd	
Reiwa	Hideaki Uemura	December 15, 1956 (age 69)	PR only	
Ishin	Kazumi Sugimoto	September 17, 1960 (age 65)	Aichi 10th	
JCP	Nobuko Motomura	October 20, 1972 (age 53)	PR only	
CPJ	Yuko Takegami	March 6, 1960 (age 66)	PR only	

=== Kinki（Kansai） block ===
Members by single-member constituencies

Constituency	Member	Party	Born	Note
Hyōgo 1st	Nobuhiko Isaka	CDP	March 27, 1974 (age 52)	
Hyōgo 2nd	Kazuyoshi Akaba	Komeito	May 7, 1958 (age 68)	
Hyōgo 3rd	Yoshihiro Seki	LDP	June 7, 1965 (age 61)	
Hyōgo 4th	Hisayuki Fujii	LDP	September 11, 1971 (age 54)	
Hyōgo 5th	Koichi Tani	LDP	January 28, 1952 (age 74)	
Hyōgo 6th	Shu Sakurai	CDP	August 16, 1970 (age 56)	
Hyōgo 7th	Kenji Yamada	LDP	April 20, 1966 (age 60)	
Hyōgo 8th	Hiromasa Nakano	Komeito	January 4, 1978 (age 48)	
Hyōgo 9th	Yasutoshi Nishimura	Independent	October 15, 1962 (age 63)	
Hyōgo 10th	Kisaburo Tokai	LDP	February 11, 1948 (age 78)	
Hyōgo 11th	Takeaki Matsumoto	LDP	April 25, 1959 (age 67)	
Hyōgo 12th	Tsuyoshi Yamaguchi	LDP	October 3, 1954 (age 71)	
Kyoto 1st	Yasushi Katsume	LDP	May 17, 1974 (age 52)	
Kyoto 2nd	Seiji Maehara	Ishin	April 30, 1962 (age 64)	
Kyoto 3rd	Kenta Izumi	CDP	July 29, 1974 (age 52)	
Kyoto 4th	Keiro Kitagami	Independent	February 1, 1967 (age 59)	Kitagami belongs to a parliamentary group "Yūshi no Kai".
Kyoto 5th	Taro Honda	LDP	December 1, 1973 (age 52)	
Kyoto 6th	Kazunori Yamanoi	CDP	January 6, 1962 (age 64)	
Nara 1st	Sumio Mabuchi	CDP	August 23, 1960 (age 65)	
Nara 2nd	Sanae Takaichi	LDP	March 7, 1961 (age 65)	Prime Minister. President of the LDP.
Nara 3rd	Taido Tanose	LDP	July 4, 1974 (age 52)	
Osaka 1st	Hidetaka Inoue	Ishin	October 25, 1971 (age 54)	
Osaka 2nd	Tadashi Morishima	Ishin	July 15, 1981 (age 45)	
Osaka 3rd	Tōru Azuma	Ishin	September 16, 1966 (age 59)	
Osaka 4th	Teruo Minobe	Ishin	May 23, 1961 (age 65)	
Osaka 5th	Satoshi Umemura	Ishin	February 13, 1975 (age 51)	
Osaka 6th	Kaoru Nishida	Ishin	April 30, 1967 (age 59)	
Osaka 7th	Takemitsu Okushita	Ishin	October 4, 1975 (age 50)	
Osaka 8th	Joji Uruma	Ishin	September 14, 1974 (age 51)	
Osaka 9th	Kei Hagihara	Ishin	July 27, 1977 (age 49)	
Osaka 10th	Taku Ikeshita	Ishin	April 10, 1975 (age 51)	
Osaka 11th	Hiroshi Nakatsuka	Ishin	March 11, 1956 (age 70)	
Osaka 12th	Fumitake Fujita	Ishin	December 27, 1980 (age 45)	Secretary-General of the Ishin. Chairperson of the Ishin's Election Strategy Committee.
Osaka 13th	Ryohei Iwatani	Ishin	June 7, 1980 (age 46)	
Osaka 14th	Hitoshi Aoyagi	Ishin	November 7, 1978 (age 47)	
Osaka 15th	Yasuto Urano	Ishin	April 4, 1973 (age 53)	
Osaka 16th	Masaki Kuroda	Ishin	December 20, 1979 (age 46)	
Osaka 17th	Nobuyuki Baba	Ishin	January 27, 1965 (age 61)	Leader of the Ishin.
Osaka 18th	Takashi Endo	Ishin	June 6, 1968 (age 58)	
Osaka 19th	Nobuhisa Ito	Ishin	January 4, 1964 (age 62)	
Shiga 1st	Alex Saito	Ishin	June 30, 1985 (age 41)	
Shiga 2nd	Kenichiro Ueno	LDP	August 3, 1965 (age 61)	
Shiga 3rd	Nobuhide Takemura	LDP	January 21, 1972 (age 54)	
Wakayama 1st	Daichi Yamamoto	LDP	May 28, 1991 (age 35)	
Wakayama 2nd	Hiroshige Sekō	Independent	November 9, 1962 (age 63)	

Members by Proportional Representation block

Party	Member	Born	Constituency	Note
Ishin	Yumi Hayashi	May 12, 1981 (age 45)	Wakayama 1st	
Ishin	Kee Miki	July 7, 1966 (age 60)	Hyōgo 7th	
Ishin	Junko Tokuyasu	January 15, 1962 (age 64)	Hyōgo 8th	
Ishin	Koichiro Ichimura	July 16, 1964 (age 62)	Hyōgo 6th	
Ishin	Yuichiro Wada	October 23, 1964 (age 61)	Hyōgo 3rd	
Ishin	Kotaro Ikehata	September 26, 1974 (age 51)	Hyōgo 12th	
Ishin	Keishi Abe	May 26, 1986 (age 40)	Hyōgo 2nd	
LDP	Hiroo Kotera	September 18, 1960 (age 65)	PR only	
LDP	Masatoshi Ishida	April 11, 1952 (age 74)	PR only	
LDP	Toshitaka Ōoka	April 16, 1972 (age 54)	Shiga 1st	
LDP	Masaki Ogushi	January 20, 1966 (age 60)	Hyōgo 6th	
LDP	Shigeki Kobayashi	October 9, 1964 (age 61)	Nara 1st	
LDP	Tomoaki Shimada	December 2, 1969 (age 56)	Osaka 15th	
CDP	Hiroyuki Moriyama	April 8, 1971 (age 55)	Osaka 16th	
CDP	Keigo Hashimoto	December 3, 1988 (age 37)	Hyōgo 9th	
CDP	Satoru Okada	January 21, 1984 (age 42)	Hyōgo 7th	
CDP	Kanako Otsuji	December 16, 1974 (age 51)	Osaka 10th	
Komeito	Yuzuru Takeuchi	June 25, 1958 (age 68)	PR only	
Komeito	Tomoko Ukishima	February 1, 1963 (age 63)	PR only	
Komeito	Yoko Wanibuchi	April 10, 1972 (age 54)	PR only	
JCP	Kotaro Tatsumi	August 21, 1976 (age 50)	PR only	
JCP	Akiko Horikawa	October 11, 1986 (age 39)	Kyoto 2nd	
Reiwa	Akiko Oishi	May 27, 1977 (age 49)	Osaka 5th	
Reiwa	Ai Yahata	July 21, 1987 (age 39)	Osaka 13th	
Sanseitō	Yuko Kitano	September 19, 1985 (age 40)	Shiga 3rd	
CPJ	Yoichi Shimada	October 23, 1957 (age 68)	PR only	

=== Chugoku block ===
Members by single-member constituencies

Constituency	Member	Party	Born	Note
Hiroshima 1st	Fumio Kishida	LDP	July 29, 1957 (age 69)	
Hiroshima 2nd	Hiroshi Hiraguchi	LDP	August 1, 1948 (age 78)	
Hiroshima 3rd	Tetsuo Saito	Komeito	February 5, 1952 (age 74)	Chief Representative of Komeito.
Hiroshima 4th	Seiki Soramoto	Ishin	March 11, 1964 (age 62)	
Hiroshima 5th	Koji Sato	CDP	July 28, 1959 (age 67)	
Hiroshima 6th	Fumiaki Kobayashi	LDP	April 8, 1983 (age 43)	
Okayama 1st	Ichiro Aisawa	LDP	June 10, 1954 (age 72)	
Okayama 2nd	Takashi Yamashita	LDP	September 8, 1965 (age 60)	
Okayama 3rd	Katsunobu Katō	LDP	November 22, 1955 (age 70)	
Okayama 4th	Michiyoshi Yunoki	CDP	May 28, 1972 (age 54)	
Shimane 1st	Akiko Kamei	CDP	May 14, 1965 (age 61)	
Shimane 2nd	Yasuhiro Takami	LDP	October 16, 1980 (age 45)	
Tottori 1st	Shigeru Ishiba	LDP	February 4, 1957 (age 69)	
Tottori 2nd	Ryosei Akazawa	LDP	December 18, 1960 (age 65)	Minister of State for Economic and Fiscal Policy.
Yamaguchi 1st	Masahiro Kōmura	LDP	November 14, 1970 (age 55)	
Yamaguchi 2nd	Nobuchiyo Kishi	LDP	May 16, 1991 (age 35)	
Yamaguchi 3rd	Yoshimasa Hayashi	LDP	January 19, 1961 (age 65)	Minister of Internal Affairs and Communications.

Members by Proportional Representation block

Party	Member	Born	Constituency	Note
LDP	Masayoshi Shintani	March 8, 1975 (age 51)	PR only	
LDP	Shojiro Hiranuma	November 11, 1979 (age 46)	PR only	
LDP	Rintaro Ishibashi	May 2, 1978 (age 48)	PR only	
LDP	Shinji Yoshida	July 6, 1984 (age 42)	PR only	
LDP	Minoru Terada	January 24, 1958 (age 68)	Hiroshima 4th	
CDP	Hideo Hiraoka	January 14, 1954 (age 72)	Yamaguchi 2nd	
CDP	Keisuke Tsumura	October 27, 1971 (age 54)	Okayama 2nd	
CDP	Katsuya Azuma	September 30, 1981 (age 44)	Hiroshima 3rd	
Komeito	Akira Hirabayashi	February 2, 1971 (age 55)	PR only	
DPP	Gen Fukuda	December 6, 1981 (age 44)	Hiroshima 2nd	

=== Shikoku block ===
Members by single-member constituencies

Constituency	Member	Party	Born	Note
Ehime 1st	Akihisa Shiozaki	LDP	September 9, 1976 (age 49)	
Ehime 2nd	Yoichi Shiraishi	CDP	June 25, 1963 (age 63)	
Ehime 3rd	Junji Hasegawa	LDP	August 5, 1968 (age 58)	
Kagawa 1st	Junya Ogawa	CDP	April 18, 1971 (age 55)	
Kagawa 2nd	Yuichiro Tamaki	DPP	May 1, 1969 (age 57)	
Kagawa 3rd	Keitaro Ohno	LDP	November 1, 1968 (age 57)	
Kōchi 1st	Gen Nakatani	LDP	October 14, 1957 (age 68)	
Kōchi 2nd	Masanao Ozaki	LDP	September 14, 1967 (age 58)	
Tokushima 1st	Hirobumi Niki	LDP	May 23, 1966 (age 60)	
Tokushima 2nd	Shunichi Yamaguchi	LDP	February 28, 1950 (age 76)	

Members by Proportional Representation block

Party	Member	Born	Constituency	Note
LDP	Seiichiro Murakami	May 11, 1952 (age 74)	PR only	
LDP	Takuya Hirai	January 25, 1958 (age 68)	Kagawa 1st	
LDP	Takakazu Seto	August 2, 1965 (age 61)	Kagawa 2nd	
CDP	Ei Takahashi	August 30, 1975 (age 50)	Tokushima 1st	
DPP	Tomoe Ishi	November 16, 1967 (age 58)	Ehime 1st	
Komeito	Masayasu Yamazaki	March 5, 1971 (age 55)	PR only	

=== Kyushu block ===
Members by single-member constituencies

Constituency	Member	Party	Born	Note
Fukuoka 1st	Takahiro Inoue	LDP	April 2, 1962 (age 64)	
Fukuoka 2nd	Shūji Inatomi	CDP	August 26, 1970 (age 55)	
Fukuoka 3rd	Atsushi Koga	LDP	July 14, 1972 (age 54)	
Fukuoka 4th	Hideki Miyauchi	LDP	October 19, 1962 (age 63)	
Fukuoka 5th	Wataru Kurihara	LDP	September 27, 1965 (age 60)	
Fukuoka 6th	Jiro Hatoyama	LDP	January 1, 1979 (age 47)	
Fukuoka 7th	Satoshi Fujimaru	LDP	January 19, 1960 (age 66)	
Fukuoka 8th	Tarō Asō	LDP	September 20, 1940 (age 85)	
Fukuoka 9th	Rintaro Ogata	Independent	January 8, 1973 (age 53)	Ogata belongs to a parliamentary group "Yūshi no Kai".
Fukuoka 10th	Takashi Kii	CDP	June 23, 1973 (age 53)	
Fukuoka 11th	Tomonobu Murakami	Ishin	October 9, 1969 (age 56)	
Kagoshima 1st	Hiroshi Kawauchi	CDP	November 2, 1961 (age 64)	
Kagoshima 2nd	Satoshi Mitazono	LDP	February 13, 1958 (age 68)	Mitazono joined the LDP in January, 2025.
Kagoshima 3rd	Takeshi Noma	CDP	October 8, 1958 (age 67)	
Kagoshima 4th	Hiroshi Moriyama	LDP	April 8, 1945 (age 81)	Secretary-General of the LDP.
Kumamoto 1st	Minoru Kihara	LDP	August 12, 1969 (age 57)	
Kumamoto 2nd	Daisuke Nishino	LDP	September 22, 1978 (age 47)	
Kumamoto 3rd	Tetsushi Sakamoto	LDP	November 6, 1950 (age 75)	
Kumamoto 4th	Yasushi Kaneko	LDP	February 27, 1961 (age 65)	
Miyazaki 1st	Sō Watanabe	CDP	October 3, 1977 (age 48)	
Miyazaki 2nd	Taku Etō	LDP	July 1, 1960 (age 66)	
Miyazaki 3rd	Yoshihisa Furukawa	LDP	August 3, 1965 (age 61)	
Nagasaki 1st	Hideko Nishioka	DPP	March 15, 1964 (age 62)	
Nagasaki 2nd	Ryusho Kato	LDP	February 10, 1980 (age 46)	
Nagasaki 3rd	Yozo Kaneko	LDP	February 1, 1983 (age 43)	
Ōita 1st	Shuji Kira	Independent	March 16, 1958 (age 68)	Kira belongs to a parliamentary group "Yūshi no Kai". Leader of the Yūshi no Kai.
Ōita 2nd	Ken Hirose	LDP	January 22, 1974 (age 52)	Hirose joined the LDP in January, 2025.
Ōita 3rd	Takeshi Iwaya	LDP	August 24, 1957 (age 68)	
Okinawa 1st	Seiken Akamine	JCP	December 18, 1947 (age 78)	
Okinawa 2nd	Kunio Arakaki	SDP	June 19, 1956 (age 70)	
Okinawa 3rd	Aiko Shimajiri	LDP	March 4, 1965 (age 61)	
Okinawa 4th	Kosaburo Nishime	LDP	August 7, 1954 (age 72)	
Saga 1st	Kazuhiro Haraguchi	CDP	July 2, 1959 (age 67)	
Saga 2nd	Hiroshi Ogushi	CDP	August 31, 1965 (age 60)	

Members by Proportional Representation block

Party	Member	Born	Constituency	Note
LDP	Toshiko Abe	May 19, 1959 (age 67)	PR only	
LDP	Takuma Miyaji	December 6, 1979 (age 46)	Kagoshima 1st	
LDP	Makoto Oniki	October 16, 1972 (age 53)	Fukuoka 2nd	
LDP	Kōnosuke Kokuba	January 10, 1973 (age 53)	Okinawa 1st	
LDP	Kazuchika Iwata	September 20, 1973 (age 52)	Saga 1st	
LDP	Yasushi Furukawa	July 15, 1958 (age 68)	Saga 2nd	
LDP	Masahisa Miyazaki	August 8, 1965 (age 61)	Okinawa 2nd	
CDP	Tomohiro Yara	August 22, 1962 (age 64)	Okinawa 3rd	
CDP	Hajime Yoshikawa	September 28, 1966 (age 59)	Ōita 2nd	
CDP	Katsuhiko Yamada	July 19, 1979 (age 47)	Nagasaki 2nd	
CDP	Kaname Tsutsumi	October 27, 1960 (age 65)	Fukuoka 5th	
Komeito	Masakazu Hamachi	May 8, 1970 (age 56)	PR only	
Komeito	Nobuhiro Yoshida	December 8, 1967 (age 58)	PR only	
Komeito	Yasukuni Kinjo	July 16, 1969 (age 57)	PR only	
DPP	Shinji Nagatomo	June 22, 1977 (age 49)	Miyazaki 2nd	
DPP	Ryotaro Konomi	February 7, 1974 (age 52)	Fukuoka 4th	
Reiwa	Hitoshi Yamakawa	September 24, 1974 (age 51)	Okinawa 4th	
Ishin	Hiroki Abe	December 15, 1961 (age 64)	Fukuoka 4th	
Sanseitō	Rina Yoshikawa	May 25, 1987 (age 39)	PR only	
JCP	Takaaki Tamura	April 30, 1961 (age 65)	PR only	

== See also ==
- House of Representatives
- List of districts of the House of Representatives of Japan
- List of current members of the House of Councillors
