= Muneaki Murai =

Japanese politician (born 1973)

- 村井 宗明
- Official portrait, 2012

Member of the House of Representatives; from Hokuriku-Shin'etsu
- In office 9 November 2003 – 16 November 2012
- Preceded by: Multi-member district
- Succeeded by: Hiroaki Tabata
- Constituency: PR block (2003–2009); Toyama 1st (2009–2012)

Personal details
- Born: 30 May 1973 (age 53) Ōyama, Toyama, Japan
- Party: Democratic
- Education: Doshisha University

Muneaki Murai (村井 宗明, Murai Muneaki; born 30 May 1973) is a former Japanese politician of the Democratic Party of Japan, who served as a member of the House of Representatives in the Diet (national legislature).

A native of the former Ōyama, Toyama and graduate of Doshisha University, Murai was elected to the House of Representatives for the first time in 2003.
