= Ishikawa 1st district =

Legislative district of Japan

- Parliamentary constituency for the Japanese House of Representatives
- Numbered map of Ishikawa Prefecture single-member districts
- Prefecture: Ishikawa
- Proportional District: Hokuriku-Shinetsu
- Electorate: 370,508

Current constituency
- Created: 1994
- Seats: One
- Party: Liberal Democratic
- Representative: Takuo Komori
- Municipalities: Kanazawa.

Ishikawa 1st district (石川県第1区, Ishikawa-ken dai-ikku or simply 石川1区, Ishikawa ikku) is a single-member constituency of the House of Representatives in the national Diet of Japan located in Ishikawa Prefecture.

== Areas covered ==
=== Since 1994 ===
- Kanazawa

== List of representatives ==
Election	Representative	Party	Notes
1996	Keiwa Okuda	New Frontier	
1996	Keiwa Okuda	Sun	
1996	Keiwa Okuda	Good Governance	
1996	Keiwa Okuda	Democratic	
1998 by-el	Ken Okuda	Democratic	
2000	Hiroshi Hase	Liberal Democratic	
2003	Ken Okuda	Democratic	
2005	Hiroshi Hase	Liberal Democratic	
2009	Ken Okuda	Democratic	
2012	Hiroshi Hase	Liberal Democratic	
2014	Hiroshi Hase	Liberal Democratic	
2017	Hiroshi Hase	Liberal Democratic	
2021	Takuo Komori	Liberal Democratic	
2024	Takuo Komori	Liberal Democratic	
2026	Takuo Komori	Liberal Democratic	

== Election results ==
=== 2026 ===
2026
Party	Candidate	Votes	%	±%
LDP	Takuo Komori	83,732	45	▲8.7
DPP	Kai Odake (elected in PR block)	48,150	25.9	▲12.3
Sanseitō	Yuichiro Kawa (elected in PR block)	23,350	12.5	
Ishin	Makoto Kobayashi	19,547	10.5	
JCP	Shigeru Murata	11,358	6.1	
Registered electors		370,508		
Turnout		186,137	51.79	▲2.2
LDP hold				

=== 2024 ===
2024
Party	Candidate	Votes	%	±%
LDP	Takuo Komori	64,997	36.3	
CDP	Atsushi Arai	51,506	28.7	
Ishin	Makoto Kobayashi	27,257	15.2	
DPP	Kai Odake (elected in PR block)	24,324	13.6	
JCP	Shigeru Murata	8,913	5.0	
Independent	Tokuei Fujihara	2,210	1.2	
Registered electors		371,950		
Turnout			49.59	▼2.61
LDP hold				

=== 2021 ===
2021
Party	Candidate	Votes	%	±%
Liberal Democratic (endorsed by Komeito)	Takuo Komori	88,321	46.14	
CDP (endorsed by SDP)	Atsushi Arai	48,491	25.33	New
Innovation	Makoto Kobayashi	45,663	23.86	New
Communist	Ryosuke Kameda	8,930	4.67	
Majority		39,830	20.81	
Registered electors		376,122		
Turnout			52.20	▲0.28
LDP hold				

=== 2017 ===
2017
Party	Candidate	Votes	%	±%
Liberal Democratic (endorsed by Komeito)	Hiroshi Hase (incumbent)	112,168	59.08	
Kibō no Tō	Mieko Tanaka	61,541	32.41	New
Communist	Kiyonori Kurosaki	16,152	8.51	
Majority		50,627	26.67	
Registered electors		376,647		
Turnout			51.92	
LDP hold				

=== 2014 ===
2014
Party	Candidate	Votes	%	±%
Liberal Democratic (endorsed by Komeito・NRP)	Hiroshi Hase (incumbent)	76,422	50.70	
Democratic (endorsed by SDP)	Mieko Tanaka	59,590	39.53	
Communist	Ryosuke Kameda	14,720	9.77	
Majority		16,832	11.17	
Turnout				
LDP hold				

=== 2012 ===
2012
Party	Candidate	Votes	%	±%
Liberal Democratic	Hiroshi Hase (PR seat incumbent)	99,544	47.87	
Democratic	Ken Okuda (incumbent)	47,582	22.88	
Restoration	Shunsuke Komai	41,207	19.82	New
Tomorrow	Morio Kumano	10,629	5.11	New
Communist	Kiyonori Kurosaki	8,969	4.31	
Majority		51,962	24.99	
Turnout				
LDP gain from Democratic				

=== 2009 ===
2009
Party	Candidate	Votes	%	±%
Democratic	Ken Okuda	125,667	49.17	
Liberal Democratic	Hiroshi Hase (incumbent) (won PR seat)	117,168	45.85	
Communist	Masayuki Sato	10,982	4.30	
Happiness Realization	Junichi Matsubayashi	1,738	0.68	New
Majority		8,499	3.32	
Turnout				
Democratic gain from LDP				

=== 2005 ===
2005
Party	Candidate	Votes	%	±%
Liberal Democratic	Hiroshi Hase (PR seat incumbent)	129,142	53.73	
Democratic	Ken Okuda (incumbent)	99,397	41.36	
Communist	Masayuki Sato	11,802	4.91	
Majority		29,745	12.37	
Turnout				
LDP gain from Democratic				
