= Takahide =

- Gender: Male

Origin
- Origin: Japanese
- Meaning: Different meanings depending on the kanji used

Takahide (written: 隆秀, 貴秀 or 高秀) is a masculine Japanese given name. Notable people with the name include:

- Takahide Aioi (相生 高秀; born 1912), Japanese naval aviator
- Takahide Kimura (木村 隆秀; born 1955), Japanese politician
- Takahide Umebachi (梅鉢 貴秀; born 1992), Japanese footballer

Takahide (written: 高秀) is also a Japanese surname. Notable people with the surname include:

- Hidenobu Takahide (高秀 秀信) (1929–2002), Japanese politician
