= Hiroshi Nakada =

Japanese politician

- 中田 宏
- Official portrait, 2026

Member of the House of Representatives
- Incumbent
- Assumed office 9 February 2026
- Preceded by: Hiroaki Tabata
- Constituency: Toyama 1st
- In office 16 December 2012 – 21 November 2014
- Constituency: Hokuriku-Shin'etsu PR
- In office 18 July 1993 – 17 March 2002
- Preceded by: Tsuneo Suzuki
- Succeeded by: Kenji Eda
- Constituency: Kanagawa 1st (1993–1996); Kanagawa 8th (1996–2002)

Member of the House of Councillors
- In office 15 May 2022 – 28 July 2025
- Preceded by: Shuji Miyamoto
- Succeeded by: Multi-member district
- Constituency: National PR

Mayor of Yokohama
- In office 8 April 2002 – 17 August 2009
- Preceded by: Hidenobu Takahide
- Succeeded by: Fumiko Hayashi

Personal details
- Born: September 20, 1964 (age 62) Aoba-ku, Yokohama, Kanagawa, Japan
- Party: LDP (since 2019)
- Other political affiliations: JNP (1992–1994); NFP (1994–1998); Independent (1998–2010; 2015–2019); SJP (2010–2012); JRP (2012–2014); PJK (2014–2015)
- Education: Aoyama Gakuin University

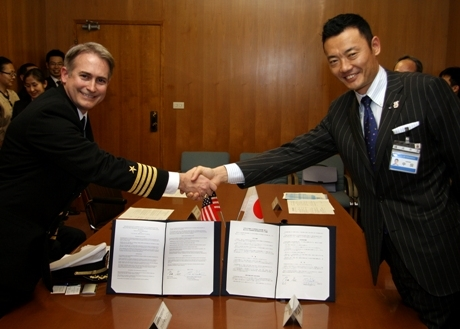
Hiroshi Nakada (right) shakes hands with the commanding officer of NAF Atsugi on April 10, 2009

Hiroshi Nakada (中田 宏, Nakada Hiroshi; born 20 September 1964) is a Japanese politician who served as the mayor of Yokohama, Kanagawa in Japan from 2002 to 2009. A graduate of Aoyama Gakuin University, he served at the Matsushita Institute of Government and Management before working in the House of Councillors in the Diet.

He was first elected mayor of Yokohama in April 2002 after serving in the House of Representatives in the Diet (national legislature) for three terms since July 1993. He was re-elected in 2006.

He has been compared to Carlos Ghosn, the visionary CEO of Nissan, whose Revival Plan he emulated and enticed the corporation to relocate to the city with.

He is longlisted for the 2008 World Mayor award.

Political career

- 1993–1996: first term in House of Representatives
- 1996–2000: second term in House of Representatives
- 2000–2002: third term in House of Representatives
- 2002–2006: first term as Mayor of Yokohama
- 2006–2010: second term as Mayor of Yokohama

== See also ==
- Tokyo International Conference on African Development (TICAD-IV), 2008.

Political offices
Preceded by Hidenobu Takahide	Mayor of Yokohama; 2002-2009	Succeeded by Fumiko Hayashi
