= Hidenobu =

- Gender: Male

Origin
- Origin: Japanese
- Meaning: Different meanings depending on the kanji used

Hidenobu (written: 秀信 or 英暢) is a masculine Japanese given name. Notable people with the name include:

- Hidenobu Kiuchi (木内 秀信; born 1969), Japanese voice actor
- Oda Hidenobu (織田 秀信; 1580–1605), Japanese samurai
- Hidenobu Takahide (高秀 秀信; 1929–2002), Japanese politician
- Hidenobu Takasu (高須 英暢; born 1991), Japanese footballer
