= Yasufumi =

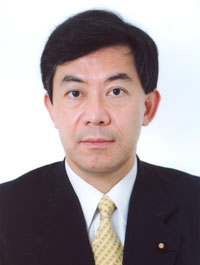
- Yasufumi Tanahashi, Japanese politician
- Pronunciation: jasɯɸɯmi (IPA)
- Gender: Male

Origin
- Origin: Japanese
- Meaning: Different meanings depending on the kanji used

Other names
- Alternative spelling: Yasuhumi (Kunrei-shiki) Yasuhumi (Nihon-shiki) Yasufumi (Hepburn)

Yasufumi is a masculine Japanese given name.

== Written forms ==
Yasufumi can be written using different combinations of kanji characters. Here are some examples:

- 康文, "healthy, literature"
- 康史, "healthy, history"
- 康郁, "healthy, aroma/to move"
- 靖文, "peaceful, literature"
- 靖史, "peaceful, history"
- 靖郁, "peaceful, aroma/to move"
- 安文, "tranquil, literature"
- 安史, "tranquil, history"
- 安郁, "tranquil, aroma/to move"
- 保文, "preserve, literature"
- 保史, "preserve, history"
- 保郁, "preserve, aroma/to move"
- 泰文, "peaceful, literature"
- 泰史, "peaceful, history"
- 泰郁, "peaceful, aroma/to move"
- 易文, "divination, literature"
- 易史, "divination, history"
- 恭文, "respectful, literature"

The name can also be written in hiragana やすふみ or katakana ヤスフミ.

== Notable people with the name ==
- Yasufumi Fujino (藤野 保史), Japanese politician
- Yasufumi Nakanoue (中之上 靖文; born 1986), Japanese professional wrestler
- Yasufumi Nishimura (西村 恭史; born 1999), Japanese footballer
- Yasufumi Tanahashi (棚橋 泰文; born 1963), Japanese politician
- Yasufumi Terawaki (寺脇 康文; born 1962), Japanese actor
- Yasufumi Yamamoto (born 1971), Japanese tennis player
