= Isato Kunisada =

Japanese politician (born 1972)

- 國定 勇人
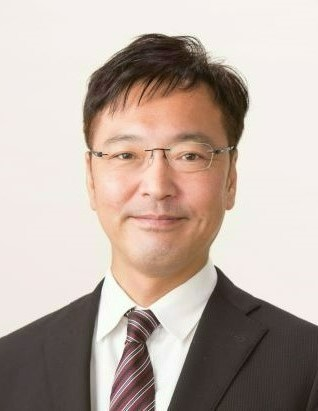
- Official portrait, 2022

Member of the House of Representatives; from Hokuriku-Shin'etsu
- Incumbent
- Assumed office 6 November 2021
- Constituency: PR block (2021–2026); Niigata 2nd (2026–present)

Mayor of Sanjō
- In office 12 November 2006 – 15 October 2020
- Preceded by: Kazuo Takahashi
- Succeeded by: Ryō Takizawa

Personal details
- Born: 30 August 1972 (age 54) Chiyoda, Tokyo, Japan
- Party: Liberal Democratic
- Education: Hitotsubashi University

Isato Kunisada (国定勇人, Kunisada Isato; born 30 August 1972) is a Japanese politician serving as a member of the House of Representatives since 2021. From 2006 to 2020, he served as mayor of Sanjō.
