= Yosei Ide =

Japanese politician (born 1977)

- 井出 庸生
- Official portrait, 2022

Member of the House of Representatives; from Hokuriku-Shin'etsu
- Incumbent
- Assumed office 21 December 2012
- Constituency: PR block (2012–2014); Nagano 3rd (2014–2024); PR block (2024–2026); Nagano 3rd (2026–present)

Personal details
- Born: 21 November 1977 (age 48) Tokyo, Japan
- Party: Liberal Democratic (since 2019)
- Other political affiliations: Your Party (2010–2013); Unity (2013–2014); JIP (2014–2016); DP (2016–2017); KnT (2017–2018); Independent (2018–2019)
- Relatives: Shoichi Ide (uncle); Ichitaro Ide (grandfather)
- Education: University of Tokyo

Yosei Ide (井出庸生, Ide Yosei; born 21 November 1977) is a Japanese politician serving as a member of the House of Representatives since 2012. He is the nephew of Shoichi Ide and the grandson of Ichitaro Ide.
