= Kai Odake =

Japanese politician (born 1998)

- 小竹 凱

Member of the House of Representatives
- Incumbent
- Assumed office 1 November 2024
- Constituency: Hokuriku-Shin'etsu PR

Personal details
- Born: 17 May 1998 (age 28) Kanazawa, Ishikawa, Japan
- Party: DPP
- Education: National Institute of Technology, Ishikawa College

Kai Odake (小竹凱, Odake Kai; born 17 May 1998) is a Japanese politician serving as a member of the House of Representatives since 2024. He has served as chairman of the Democratic Party For the People's youth wing in Ishikawa Prefecture since 2023.
