= Junta Fukuda =

Japanese politician (born 1993)

- 福田 淳太

Member of the House of Representatives
- In office 1 November 2024 – 23 January 2026
- Constituency: Hokuriku-Shin'etsu PR

Personal details
- Born: 3 November 1993 (age 32) Iida, Nagano, Japan
- Party: CRA (since 2026)
- Other political affiliations: CDP (2024–2026)
- Education: Kokugakuin University

Junta Fukuda (福田淳太, Fukuda Junta; born 3 November 1993) is a Japanese politician who served as a member of the House of Representatives from 2024 to 2026. He previously worked as a reporter for Chiba Nippo and served as secretary to Kazuma Nakatani.
