= Hiroaki Tabata =

Japanese politician

- 田畑 裕明
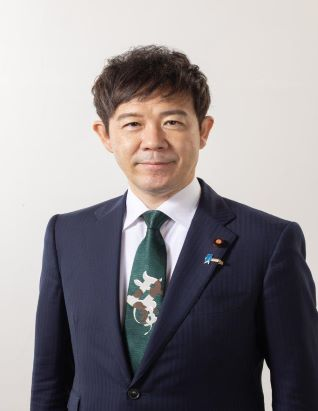
- Official portrait, 2021

Member of the House of Representatives; from Hokuriku-Shin'etsu
- Incumbent
- Assumed office 19 December 2012
- Preceded by: Muneaki Murai
- Constituency: Toyama 1st (2012–2026); PR block (2026–present)

Member of the Toyama Prefectural Assembly
- In office 30 April 2011 – 2012
- Constituency: Toyama City 1st

Member of the Toyama City Assembly
- In office 2003–2011

Personal details
- Born: 2 January 1973 (age 53) Toyama, Japan
- Party: Liberal Democratic
- Education: Dokkyo University

Hiroaki Tabata (born 2 January 1973) is a Japanese politician who is a member of the House of Representatives of Japan.

== Biography ==
He was elected in 2012.
