= Tokyo 28th district =

Electoral district in Tokyo, Japan

Tokyo 28th District
- 東京都第28区
- Parliamentary constituency for the Japanese House of Representatives
- Prefecture: Tokyo
- Proportional Block: Tokyo
- Electorate: 313,718 (as of September 2022)

Current constituency
- Created: 2022
- Seats: One
- Party: LDP
- Representative: Takao Ondō
- Created from: Parts of: Tokyo 9th; Tokyo 10th

Tokyo 28th District (東京都第28区, Tokyo-to dai-nijuhachi-ku) is an electoral district of the Japanese House of Representatives. The district was created as part of the 2022 reapportionment that added five new districts to Tokyo. Satoshi Takamatsu, a former member of the Nerima ward assembly, became the first representative as a result of the 2024 general election.

== Areas covered ==
=== Current district ===
As of 11 January 2023, the areas covered by this district are as follows:

- Eastern section of Nerima
  - Asahigaoka 1-2, Kotake 1-2, Sakae-Machi, Hazawa 1-3, Toyotama-Kami 1-2, Toyotama-Naka 1-4, Toyotama-Minami 1-3, Toyotama-Kita 1-6, Nakamura 1-3, Nakamuraminami 1-3, Nakamurakita 1-4, Sakuradai 1-6, Nerima 1-4, Mukaiyama 1-4, Nukui 1-3, Nukui 4 (28th, 29th 4, 8-22, 30th 9, 10, 44-46, 47th 18-48, 50-52 excluded), Nukui 5, Nishiki 1-2, Hikawadai 1-4, Heiwadai 1-4, Hayamiya 1-4, Kasugacho 1-6, Takamatsu 1-5, Kitamachi 1-8, Tagara 1-5, Hikarigaoka 1-7, Asahi 1-3, Fujimidai 3 (excluding 20-6-10, 38-46, 47-5-7, 55-6-17, 56-63), Yahara 1

Before the creation of this district, the eastern parts of Nerima were split between the 9th and 10th districts.

== Elected representatives ==
Representative	Party	Years served	Notes
Satoshi Takamatsu	CDP	2024 – 2026	
Takao Ondō	LDP	2026 –	

== Election results ==
2026
Party	Candidate	Votes	%	±%
LDP	Takao Ondō	69,037	36.6	▲7.7
Centrist Reform	Satoshi Takamatsu	41,482	22.0	▼6.9
DPP	Hiroaki Misawa	28,905	15.3	▼4.7
Ishin	Naho Hashiguchi	18,743	9.9	▲2.8
Sanseitō	Kazuki Muramatsu	17,211	9.1	▲2.7
JCP	Naomi Takano	13,045	6.9	▼1.4
Registered electors		314,452		
Turnout			61.08	▲3.92
LDP gain from Centrist Reform				

2024
Party	Candidate	Votes	%	±%
CDP	Satoshi Takamatsu	50,626	29.1	
LDP	Takao Ondō (elected in PR)	50,290	28.9	
DPP	Yoshihiro Okumura	34,930	20.1	
JCP	Naomi Takano	14,530	8.4	
Ishin	Takashi Fujikawa	12,344	7.1	
Sanseitō	Sanae Ezaki	11,109	6.4	
Turnout			57.16	
