= Nagano 3rd district =

Legislative district of Japan

- Parliamentary constituency for the Japanese House of Representatives
- Numbered map of inner Nagano single-member districts
- Prefecture: Nagano
- Proportional District: Hokurikushin'etsu
- Electorate: 400,529 (2020)

Current constituency
- Created: 1994
- Seats: One
- Party: LDP
- Representative: Yosei Ide
- Created from: Nagano 2nd district (1947–1993)
- Municipalities: Ueda, Komoro, Chikuma, Saku, Tōmi, Minamisaku, Kitasaku, Chiisagata and Hanishina

Nagano 3rd district (長野県第3区, Nagano-ken dai-sanku or 長野3区, Nagano sanku) is a single-member constituency of the House of Representatives, the lower house of the national Diet of Japan. It is located in central and eastern part of Nagano Prefecture and consists of Ueda City, Komoro City, Chikuma City, Saku City, Tōmi City, Minamisaku District, Kitasaku District, Chiisagata District and Hanishina District. As of December 2020, 400,529 eligible voters were registered in the district.

Yosei Ide, a Liberal Democrat, has represented this district since December 2014.

== List of members representing the district ==
Member	Party	Dates	Electoral history	Notes
Tsutomu Hata	New Frontier	October 21, 1996 – December 26, 1996	Redistricted from the former 2nd district and Re-elected in 1996. Re-elected in 2000. Re-elected in 2003. Re-elected in 2005. Re-elected in 2009. Retired.	Prime Minister of Japan (1994)
Tsutomu Hata	Sun	December 26, 1996 – January 23, 1998	Redistricted from the former 2nd district and Re-elected in 1996. Re-elected in 2000. Re-elected in 2003. Re-elected in 2005. Re-elected in 2009. Retired.	Prime Minister of Japan (1994)
Tsutomu Hata	Good Governance	January 23, 1998 – April 27, 1998	Redistricted from the former 2nd district and Re-elected in 1996. Re-elected in 2000. Re-elected in 2003. Re-elected in 2005. Re-elected in 2009. Retired.	Prime Minister of Japan (1994)
Tsutomu Hata	Democratic	April 27, 1998 – November 16, 2012	Redistricted from the former 2nd district and Re-elected in 1996. Re-elected in 2000. Re-elected in 2003. Re-elected in 2005. Re-elected in 2009. Retired.	Prime Minister of Japan (1994)
Yoshiyuki Terashima	Democratic	December 17, 2012 – November 21, 2014	Elected in 2012. Lost re-election.	Lost re-election in the Hokurikushin'etsu PR block.
Yosei Ide	Innovation	December 15, 2014 – March 27, 2016	Re-elected in 2014. Re-elected in 2017.	Elected in 2012 in the Hokurikushin'etsu PR block. Elected in 2024 in the Hokurikushin'etsu PR block.
Yosei Ide	Democratic	March 27, 2016 – October 3, 2017	Re-elected in 2014. Re-elected in 2017.	Elected in 2012 in the Hokurikushin'etsu PR block. Elected in 2024 in the Hokurikushin'etsu PR block.
Yosei Ide	Kibō no Tō	October 3, 2017 – May 7, 2018	Re-elected in 2014. Re-elected in 2017.	Elected in 2012 in the Hokurikushin'etsu PR block. Elected in 2024 in the Hokurikushin'etsu PR block.
Yosei Ide	Independent	May 7, 2018 – December 21, 2019	Re-elected in 2014. Re-elected in 2017.	Elected in 2012 in the Hokurikushin'etsu PR block. Elected in 2024 in the Hokurikushin'etsu PR block.
Yosei Ide	LDP	December 21, 2019 – October 9 2024	Re-elected in 2014. Re-elected in 2017.	Elected in 2012 in the Hokurikushin'etsu PR block. Elected in 2024 in the Hokurikushin'etsu PR block.
Takeshi Kōzu	CDP	Octoberber 29, 2024 – present	Lost re-election in 2026	
Yosei Ide	LDP	February 8, 2026		

== Election results ==
=== 2026 ===
2026
Party	Candidate	Votes	%	±%
LDP	Yōsei Ide (PR incumbent)	111,844	48.32	▲3.33
Centrist Reform	Takeshi Kōzu (incumbent)	81,922	35.39	▼19.62
Sanseitō	Hiroki Nishina	26,407	11.41	New
Reiwa	Kōji Yamaguchi	11,296	4.88	New
Registered electors		390,068		
Turnout		231,469	60.44	▲2.54
LDP gain from Centrist Reform				

=== 2024 ===
2024
Party	Candidate	Votes	%	±%
CDP	Takeshi Kōzu (PR incumbent)	121,594	55.01	▲8.14
LDP	Yōsei Ide (incumbent) (elected by PR)	99,431	44.99	▼6.54
Registered electors				
Turnout		221,025	57.90	▼1.42
CDP gain from LDP				

=== 2021 ===
2021 Japanese general election
Party	Candidate	Votes	%
LDP	Yōsei Ide	120,023	51.5
CDP	Takeshi Kōzu (elected by PR)	109,179	46.9
Anti-NHK	Takao Ike	3,722	1.6
Registered electors		399,168	
Turnout			59.32
LDP hold			

=== 2017 ===
2017 Japanese general election
Party	Candidate	Votes	%
Kibō no Tō	Yosei Ide	127,542	53.1
LDP	Hitoshi Kiuchi	74,722	31.1
JCP	Yuka Koganezawa	34,462	14.3
Happiness Realization	Yukihisa Oikawa	3,687	1.5
Total votes		240,413	100.0
Kibō no Tō hold			

=== 2014 ===
2014 Japanese general election
Party	Candidate	Votes	%
Innovation	Yosei Ide	77,289	34.4
Democratic	Yoshiyuki Terashima	63,397	28.2
LDP	Hitoshi Kiuchi (re-elected by PR)	56,365	25.1
JCP	Chiaki Karasawa	27,947	12.4
Total votes		224,998	100.0
Ishin gain from Democratic			

=== 2012 ===
2012 Japanese general election
Party	Candidate	Votes	%
Democratic	Yoshiyuki Terashima	69,843	27.7
Your	Yosei Ide (elected by PR)	67,750	26.9
LDP	Hitoshi Kiuchi (elected by PR)	62,539	24.8
Restoration	Taisuke Ide	29,905	11.8
JCP	Syōsuke Iwaya	21,433	8.5
Total votes		251,470	100.0

=== 2009 ===
2009 Japanese general election
Party	Candidate	Votes	%
Democratic	Tsutomu Hata	138,614	47.5
LDP	Tadao Iwasaki	106,574	36.5
JCP	Syōsuke Iwaya	40,948	14.0
Happiness Realization	Manabu Ebara	5,576	1.9
Total votes		291,712	100.0

=== 2005 ===
2005 Japanese general election
Party	Candidate	Votes	%
Democratic	Tsutomu Hata	143,728	51.1
LDP	Tadao Iwasaki	102,889	36.6
JCP	Syōsuke Iwaya	34,669	12.3
Total votes		281,286	100.0

=== 2003 ===
2003 Japanese general election
Party	Candidate	Votes	%
Democratic	Tsutomu Hata	150,203	58.5
LDP	Tadao Iwasaki (re-elected by PR)	78,364	30.5
JCP	Syōsuke Iwaya	28,083	10.9
Total votes		256,650	100.0

=== 2000 ===
2000 Japanese general election
Party	Candidate	Votes	%
Democratic	Tsutomu Hata	163,382	61.2
LDP	Tadao Iwasaki (elected by PR)	67,002	25.1
JCP	Ken'ichi Nakazawa	34,110	12.8
Independent	Tokio Hosoya	2,276	0.9
Total votes		266,770	100.0

=== 1996 ===
1996 Japanese general election
Party	Candidate	Votes	%
New Frontier	Tsutomu Hata	161,670	62.6
NP-Sakigake	Syōichi Ide	70,960	27.5
JCP	Mizue Matsuzawa	25,600	9.9
Total votes		258,230	100.0
New Frontier win (new seat)			
