= Yasufumi Fujino =

Japanese politician

- 藤野 保史

Member of the House of Representatives
- In office 19 December 2014 – 14 October 2021
- Constituency: Hokuriku-Shin'etsu PR

Personal details
- Born: 4 June 1970 (age 56) Fukuoka, Japan
- Party: Communist
- Education: Kyoto University

Yasufumi Fujino (藤野 保史, Fujino Yasufumi) is a member of the Japanese Communist Party serving in the House of Representatives. He was criticized for his remarks calling the budget for the Japan Self-Defense Forces money to "kill people".
