= National Institute of Technology, Ishikawa College =

Coordinates: 36°39′46″N 136°44′22″E

National Institute of Technology, Ishikawa College (NIT, Ishikawa College) (former English name was "Ishikawa National College of Technology" until 2015) is one of national 5-year Colleges of technology (kōsen), in Ishikawa Prefecture, Japan. The college accepts junior high school graduates for a five-year program (associate bachelor's degree) or a seven-year program (advanced course.) From early in the program and throughout, It provides a highly technical education in order to meet the demands in society for engineers with practical knowledge.

== International Exchanges ==
- Hangzhou Vocational & Technical College, China, since 2007
- Dalian Vocational & Technical College, China, since 2009
- Dalian Polytechnic University, China, since 2012
- Minghsin University of Science and Technology, Taiwan, since 2016
- Hanoi Architectural University, Vietnam, since 2016
