= Yuichiro Kawa =

Japanese politician (born 1971)

- 川 裕一郎
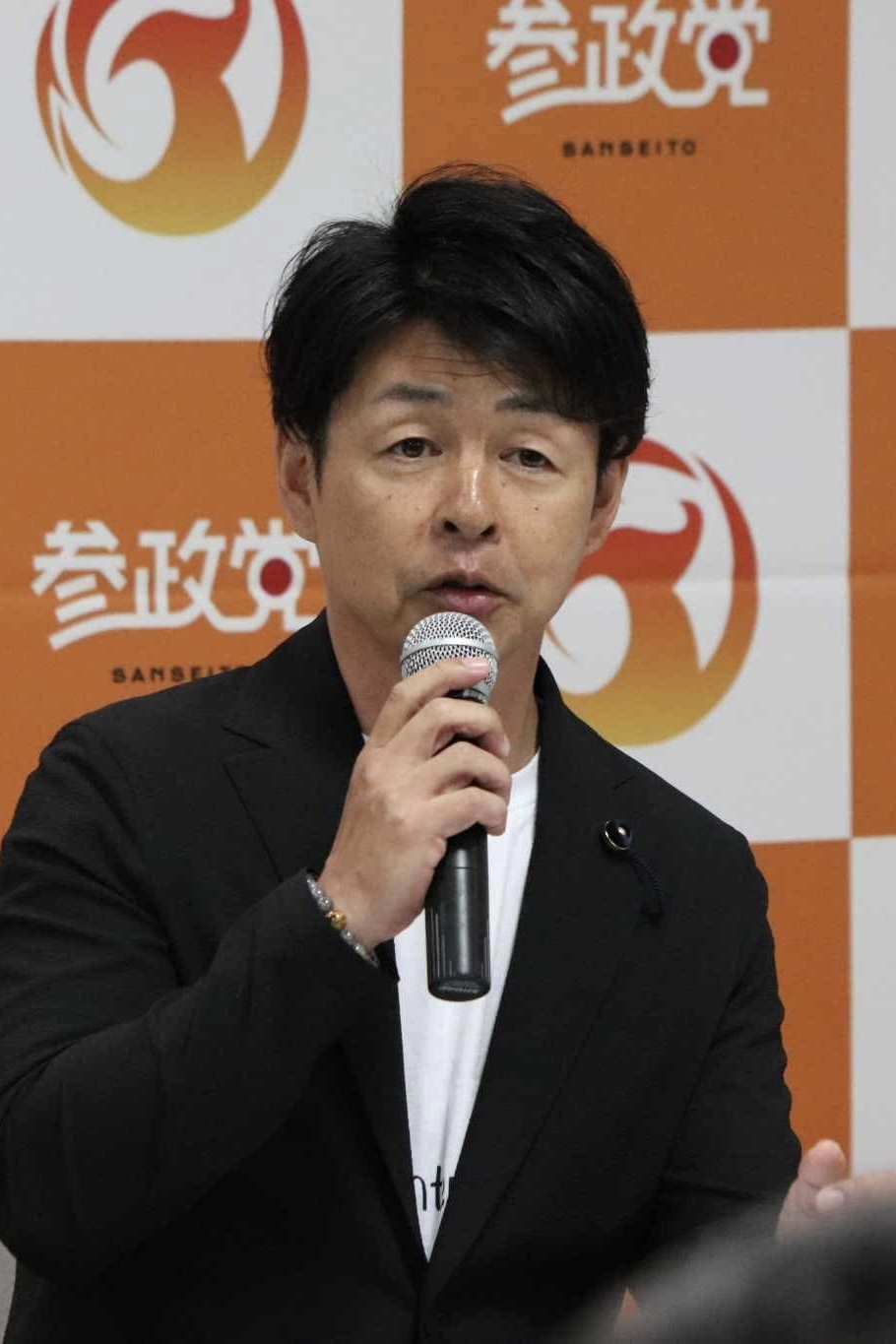
- Kawa in 2025

Member of the House of Representatives
- Incumbent
- Assumed office 8 February 2026
- Constituency: Hokuriku-Shin'etsu PR

Member of the Ishikawa Prefectural Assembly
- In office 7 October 2014 – 9 June 2025
- Constituency: Kanazawa City
- In office 30 April 2011 – 27 February 2014
- Constituency: Kanazawa City

Member of the Kanazawa City Council
- In office 2007–2011

Personal details
- Born: 27 October 1971 (age 54) Kanazawa, Ishikawa, Japan
- Party: Sanseitō (since 2020)
- Other political affiliations: Democratic (until 2013); Independent (2013–2020)

Yuichiro Kawa (川裕一郎, Kawa Yuichiro; born 27 October 1971) is a Japanese politician serving as a member of the House of Representatives since 2026. He was a member of the Ishikawa Prefectural Assembly from 2011 to 2014 and from 2014 to 2025.
