= Hidenobu Takahide =

Japanese mayor (1929–2002)

- 高秀 秀信

Mayor of Yokohama
- In office 8 April 1990 – 7 April 2002
- Preceded by: Michikazu Saigō
- Succeeded by: Hiroshi Nakada

Personal details
- Born: 18 August 1929 Yūbari, Hokkaido, Japan
- Died: 29 August 2002 (aged 73) Yokohama, Kanagawa, Japan
- Party: Independent
- Education: Hokkaido University

Hidenobu Takahide (高秀 秀信, Takahide Hidenobu; 18 August 1929 – 29 August 2002) was a Japanese bureaucrat and politician from Yūbari, Hokkaidō.

After graduating from Hokkaido University, Takahide joined the Ministry of Construction in 1952 and was appointed as the ministry's administrative vice minister in June 1984.

In March 1990, Takahide ran for the Yokohama mayoral election to succeed Michikazu Saigō, who died during his mayoralty the previous month. Backed by the Liberal Democratic Party, he was elected mayor and served for 12 years. He was installed president of Japan Association of City Mayors in June 2001.

Takahide lost to Hiroshi Nakada in the mayoral election held on 31 March 2002, despite the backing from four major political parties, the local office of the Democratic Party of Japan, and industrial and labor organizations. Five months later, he died of esophageal hemorrhage at age 73.

Political offices
Preceded by Michikazu Saigō	Mayor of Yokohama; 1990–2002	Succeeded by Hiroshi Nakada
