= Keiichiro Tachibana =

Japanese politician

- 橘 慶一郎
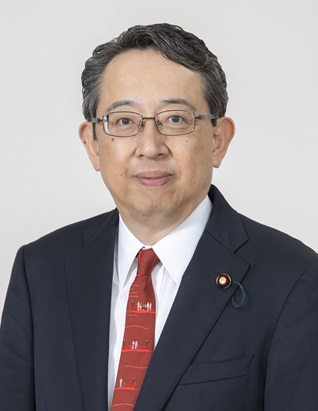
- Official portrait, 2024

Deputy Chief Cabinet Secretary (Political affairs, House of Representatives)
- In office 1 October 2024 – 21 October 2025
- Prime Minister: Shigeru Ishiba
- Preceded by: Hideki Murai
- Succeeded by: Masanao Ozaki

Member of the House of Representatives
- Incumbent
- Assumed office 30 August 2009
- Preceded by: Tamisuke Watanuki
- Constituency: Toyama 3rd

Mayor of Takaoka
- In office 20 November 2005 – 19 June 2009
- Preceded by: Himself
- Succeeded by: Masaki Takahashi
- In office 25 May 2004 – 31 October 2005
- Preceded by: Takashi Sato
- Succeeded by: Himself

Personal details
- Born: 23 January 1961 (age 65) Takaoka, Toyama, Japan
- Party: Liberal Democratic
- Education: University of Tokyo; University of Oxford

Keiichiro Tachibana is a Japanese politician who is a member of the House of Representatives of Japan.

== Biography ==
He had attended University of Tokyo and University of Oxford. He was elected to the House of Representatives in 2009.
