= Shiji Seitō Nashi =

Shiji Seitō Nashi 支持政党なし
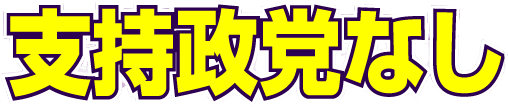
- President: Hidemitsu Sano
- Founded: 1 July 2013
- Headquarters: Kamata, Ōta-ku, Tokyo Japan
- Ideology: E-democracy
- Colours: Purple

Website
- 支持政党なし.com (in Japanese)

The Shiji Seitō Nashi (支持政党なし, lit. 'No Party to Support') is a Japanese political party. It was founded by Hidemitsu Sano in July 2013.

== See also ==
- None of the above
