= Takuo Komori =

Japanese politician

- 小森 卓郎
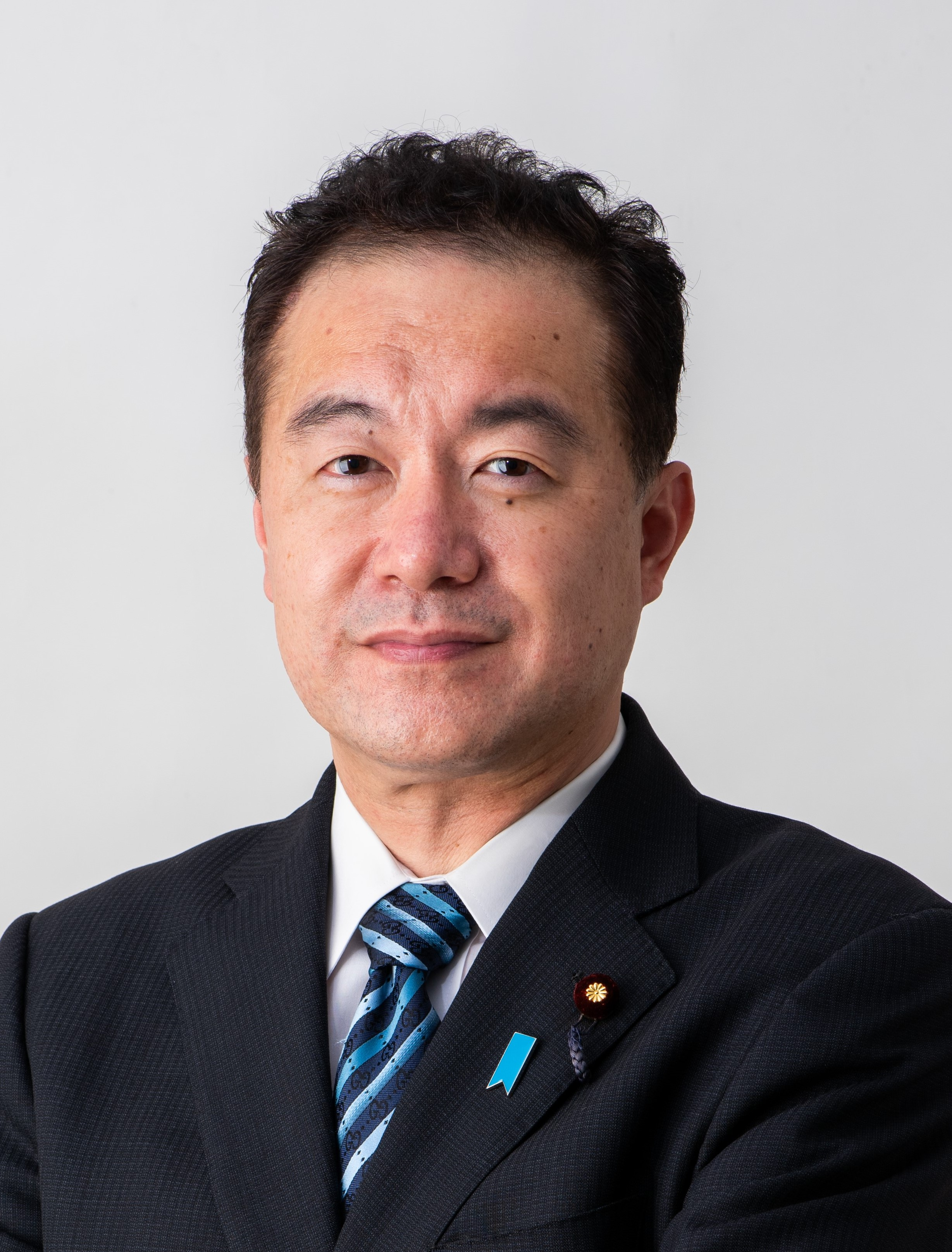
- Official portrait, 2023

Member of the House of Representatives
- Incumbent
- Assumed office 1 November 2021
- Preceded by: Hiroshi Hase
- Constituency: Ishikawa 1st

Personal details
- Born: 21 May 1970 (age 56) Yokohama, Kanagawa, Japan
- Party: Liberal Democratic
- Relatives: Shigeo Kitamura (father-in-law)
- Education: University of Tokyo; Princeton University
- Website: Takuo Komori website

Takuo Komori (小森 卓郎, Komori Takuo; born 21 May 1970) is a Japanese politician of the Liberal Democratic Party, who serves as a member of the House of Representatives.

== Early years ==
He was born in Yokohama, Kanagawa Prefecture.

After graduating from the Faculty of Law at the University of Tokyo, he joined the Ministry of Finance (then the Ministry of Treasury) in 1993.

In 1997, he completed his graduate studies at Princeton University. During his time there, he was taught macroeconomics by Ben Bernanke, who would later become the Chairman of the Federal Reserve.

For three years, from 2002 to 2005, he served as an economist at the IMF, where he was in charge of the Japanese economy.

Between 2009 and 2011, he served as a secretary to Koji Matsui and Tetsuro Fukuyama, then-Deputy Chief Cabinet Secretaries.

In July 2011, he was seconded to Ishikawa Prefecture, where he served as Director-General of the Planning and Promotion Department and the General Affairs Department. During this tenure, he was involved in the preparations for the Hokuriku Shinkansen Kanazawa extension and the establishment of the IR Ishikawa Railway.

He returned to the Ministry of Finance in July 2014. In September of the same year, he married the eldest daughter of Shigeo Kitamura, member of the House of Representatives.

== Political career ==
In 2017, his father-in-law, Kitamura, announced his retirement. While Komori's name was briefly floated as a potential successor for the Ishikawa 3rd district, the candidacy was ultimately awarded to Shoji Nishida, a member of the Ishikawa Prefectural Assembly.

In September 2021, Komori was elected to LDP's Ishikawa 1st candidate as incumbent Hiroshi Hase's successor after Hase announced he did not run to get ready for the gubernatorial election.

In the 2021 general election, Komori gained Ishikawa 1st's seat.

In 2023, Komori was appointed to Parliamentary Vice-Minister for Internal Affairs and Communications in Second Kishida second reshuffled cabinet.

In January 2024, Komori resigned Parliamentary Vice-Minister for Internal Affairs and Communications because Seiwa Seisaku Kenkyūkai which he belonged to was involved in the slush fund scandal.

In the 2024 general election, Komori was re-elected.

In 2025, Komori was appointed to Parliamentary Vice-Minister for Economy, Trade and Industry, Parliamentary Vice-Minister for Reconstruction, and Parliamentary Vice-Minister of Cabinet Office in First Takaichi cabinet.

In the 2026 general election, Komori was re-elected. After the election, he was re-appointed to Parliamentary Vice-Minister for Economy, Trade and Industry, Parliamentary Vice-Minister for Reconstruction, and Parliamentary Vice-Minister of Cabinet Office in Second Takaichi cabinet.
