= Toyama 1st district =

Legislative district of Japan

- Single-member constituency for the House of Representatives
- Electorate: 262,391

Current constituency
- Created: 1994
- Number of members: 1
- Party: Liberal Democratic
- Representative: Hiroshi Nakada

Toyama 1st district is a single-member constituency of the House of Representatives, the lower house of the National Diet of Japan. The district is located in the city of Toyama, the capital of Toyama Prefecture.

In September 2023 the district had 266,166 eligible voters.

From 2012 to 2024, the district was represented by Hiroaki Tabata of the Liberal Democratic Party. After narrowly winning the seat in the 2024 Japanese general election Tabata faced criticism for registering people as LDP party members without their permission, as well as coverup. Before the 2026 election he was replaced with Hiroshi Nakada, a former mayor of Yokohama.

== List of representatives ==
Representative	Party	Dates	Notes
Jinen Nagase	LDP	1996–2009	Won seat in PR Block in 2009
Muneaki Murai	DPJ	2009–2012	
Hiroaki Tabata	LDP	2012–2026	Elected in PR block in 2026
Hiroshi Nakada	LDP	2026–	

== Election results ==
2026
Party	Candidate	Votes	%	±%
LDP	Hiroshi Nakada	81,875	63.4	▲28.3
Centrist Reform	Toshihiro Yama	27,730	21.5	▼13.0
Sanseitō	Takumi Saitō	14,207	11.0	
JCP	Ryōsuke Aoyama	5,323	4.1	▼1.2
Registered electors		262,391		
Turnout		129,135	50.10	▼1.56
LDP hold				

2024
Party	Candidate	Votes	%	±%
LDP	Hiroaki Tabata	45,917	35.1	▼15.8
CDP	Toshihiro Yama (elected by PR)	45,179	34.5	▲24.0
Independent	Toyofumi Yoshida	19,870	15.2	
Ishin	Hirohiko Asaoka	12,995	9.9	▼22.9
JCP	Ryōsuke Aoyama	6,903	5.3	▲0.3
Registered electors		263,989		
Turnout			51.66	▼0.77
LDP hold				

2021
Party	Candidate	Votes	%	±%
LDP	Hiroaki Tabata	71,696	51.8	▼7.4
Ishin	Toyofumi Yoshida (elected by PR)	45,411	32.8	▲2.6
CDP	Masaei Nishio	14,563	10.5	
JCP	Ryōsuke Aoyama	6,800	4.9	▼5.3
Turnout			52.43	▲4.24
LDP hold				

2017
Party	Candidate	Votes	%	±%
LDP	Hiroaki Tabata	74,876	59.2	▲0.3
Ishin	Toyofumi Yoshida	38,219	30.2	▼2.8
JCP	Ryōsuke Aoyama	13,471	10.6	▲2.4
Turnout			48.19	▲1.72
LDP hold				
