= Shin'etsu region =

Geographical region of Japan

Shin'etsu (信越地方, Shin'etsu Chihō; Japanese pronunciation: [ɕìɰ̃́.é̞.t͡sɨ́, ɕíɰ̃́.é̞.t͡sɨ́, ɕíɰ̃̀.è̞.t͡sɨ̀]) is a geographical region of Japan.

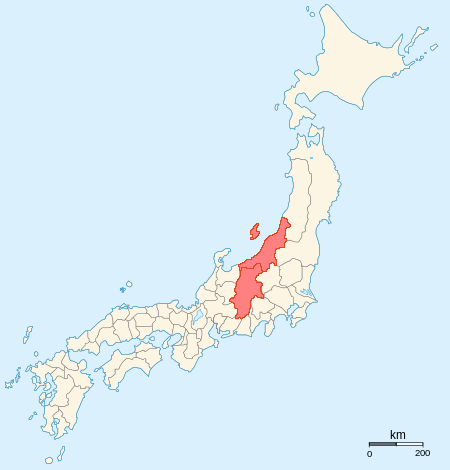
Shin'etsu Chihō highlighted

The area encompasses the old provinces of Shinano and Echigo. Though the name is a combination of those two provinces, the region also contains Sado Island from Sado Province. It is located in the modern-day prefectures of Nagano and Niigata.

== Corporate usage ==
The name Shin-Etsu is used in the name of related multinational chemical companies.

The Shin'etsu Main Line is part of Japan Railways service running from Shinonoi Station in Nagano Prefecture to Niigata Station in Niigata Prefecture.

In 1926, the Shinetsu Electric Company diversified as Shin'etsu Nitrogenous Fertilizer.

Shin-etsu Broadcasting, the JNN affiliate in Nagano is named after the name.

== Economy ==
The economy of Shin'etsu subregion is large and highly diversified with a strong focus on silverware, electronics, information technology, precision machinery, agriculture and food products, and tourism. It also produces crude oil. Until 1989, Shin'etsu subregion also had a vibrant mining economy specifically of gold in Sado Island. The Cities of Sanjō, Niigata and Tsubame, Niigata in Niigata prefecture of Shin'etsu subregion produce 90 percent of all the silverware made in Japan. The same two cities are second after Osaka in the production of scissors, kitchen knives, and wrenches.

== Demographics ==
Per Japanese census data, and, Shin'etsu subregion has reached its peak population at the year 2000 and has since faced continuous population decline.

Historical population
Year	Pop.	±%
1880	2,546,752	—
1890	2,839,798	+11.5%
1903	3,128,679	+10.2%
1913	3,395,513	+8.5%
1920	3,339,196	−1.7%
1930	3,650,444	+9.3%
1940	3,775,131	+3.4%
1950	4,521,828	+19.8%
1960	4,423,470	−2.2%
1970	4,317,899	−2.4%
1980	4,535,291	+5.0%
1990	4,631,210	+2.1%
2000	4,690,901	+1.3%
2010	4,526,899	−3.5%
2020	4,279,989	−5.5%

== See also ==
- Hokuriku region
- Kōshin'etsu region
- Tōkai region
