= Hokuriku-Shin'etsu proportional representation block =

Japanese House of Representatives constituency

Hokuriku-Shin'etsu Proportional Representation Block
- Parliamentary constituency for the Japanese House of Representatives
- Map of House of Representatives proportional blocks, with the Hokuriku-Shin'etsu block highlighted
- Prefectures: Niigata, Toyama, Ishikawa, Fukui, and Nagano
- Electorate: 5,845,292 (2026)

Current constituency
- Created: 1994
- Number of members: 10

The Hokuriku-Shin'etsu proportional representation block (Hirei [daihyō] hokuriku shinetsu burokku (比例北陸信越ブロック)) is one of eleven proportional representation (PR) "blocks", multi-member constituencies for the House of Representatives in the Diet of Japan. It consists of the Hokuriku and Shin'etsu regions, and consists of the prefectures of Niigata, Toyama, Ishikawa, Fukui, and Nagano. Following the introduction of proportional voting, Hokuriku-Shinetsu elected 13 representatives by PR in the 1996 general election, reduced to 11 in the election of 2000 when the total number of PR seats was reduced from 200 to 180, and 10 since a reapportionment in the 2024 election.

== Results timeline ==
=== Vote share ===
Party	1996	2000	2003	2005	2009	2012	2014	2017	2021	2024	2026
LDP	36.12	34.99	38.89	38.30	29.49	31.69	36.13	37.09	41.83	32.30	42.09
NFP	30.30										
DPJ (Note: 1996 DP)	12.69	25.34	36.86	32.52	44.41	18.60	22.23				
JCP	9.95	9.18	7.22	6.74	6.08	5.73	10.14	7.47	6.42	5.58	4.26
SDP	6.24	10.36	6.91	6.27	5.00	3.50	3.19	2.52	2.03	1.90	1.52
NPS	3.22										
LP		11.09									
Komeito		8.77	10.12	9.27	7.37	8.38	9.44	8.88	9.19	7.93	
PNP				6.90	5.32						
Nippon					1.63						
Ishin (Note: 2012 JRP, 2014 JIP)						19.29	13.91	4.60	10.30	7.01	7.03
Your						7.51					
TPJ						4.86					
PLP							2.45				
CDP								19.52	22.02	25.11	
KnT								19.23			
DPFP									3.81	10.46	9.79
Reiwa									3.17	6.64	3.05
Sanseitō										3.07	8.67
CRA											19.76
Others	1.48 (Note: NSP 1.48)	0.27			0.71 (Note: HRP 0.71)	0.43 (Note: HRP 0.43)	2.51 (Note: Generations 1.88, HRP 0.63)	0.70 (Note: HRP 0.70)	1.24 (Note: NHK 1.24)		1.22 (Note: Genyu 1.22)
Turnout		68.81	64.54	71.47	74.50	60.86	51.90	59.32	59.59	56.94	57.58

=== Seat distribution ===
Election	Distribution	Seats
1996		13
2000		11
2003		11
2005		11
2009		11
2012		11
2014		11
2017		11
2021		11
2024		10
2026		10

== Election results ==
=== 2026 ===
2026 results in the Hokuriku-Shin'etsu PR block
Party	Votes	Swing	%	Seats	+/–
Liberal Democratic Party (LDP)	1,387,716	42.09	▲9.79	3 (Note: Two of five seats forfeited due to lack of candidates)	▼1
Centrist Reform Alliance (CRA) (Note: Swings compared to CDP and Komeito)	651,331	19.76	▼13.28	4	0
Democratic Party For the People (DPFP)	322,739	9.79	▼0.67	1	0
Sanseitō	285,897	8.67	▲5.60	1	▲1
Japan Innovation Party (Ishin)	231,686	7.03	▲0.02	1	0
Japanese Communist Party (JCP)	140,311	4.26	▼1.32	0	0
Reiwa Shinsengumi (Reiwa)	100,497	3.05	▼3.59	0	0
Conservative Party of Japan (CPJ)	73,566	2.23	New	0	New
Social Democratic Party (SDP)	50,017	1.52	▼0.38	0	0
Tax Cuts Japan and Yukoku Alliance (Genyu)	40,094	1.22	New	0	New
Consideration the Euthanasia System	13,014	0.39	New	0	New
Total	3,296,868	100.00		10	
Invalid votes	68,995	2.05			
Turnout	3,365,863	57.58	▲0.64		
Registered voters	5,845,292				

=== 2024 ===
2024 results in the Hokuriku-Shin'etsu PR block
Party	Votes	Swing	%	Seats	+/–
Liberal Democratic Party (LDP)	1,053,516	32.30	▼9.52	4	▼2
Constitutional Democratic Party of Japan (CDP)	818,773	25.11	▲3.09	3	0
Democratic Party For the People (DPFP)	341,114	10.46	▲6.65	1	▲1
Komeito	258,634	7.93	▼1.26	1	0
Japan Innovation Party (Ishin)	228,617	7.01	▼3.29	1	0
Reiwa Shinsengumi (Reiwa)	216,659	6.64	▲3.47	0	0
Japanese Communist Party (JCP)	181,910	5.58	▼0.85	0	0
Sanseitō	100,050	3.07	New	0	New
Social Democratic Party (SDP)	61,928	1.90	▼0.13	0	0
Total	3,261,201	100.00		10	▼1
Invalid votes	105,818	3.14			
Turnout	3,367,019	56.94	▼2.65		
Registered voters	5,913,055				

=== 2021 ===
2021 results in the Hokuriku-Shin'etsu PR block
Party	Votes	Swing	%	Seats	+/–
Liberal Democratic Party (LDP)	1,468,380	41.83	▲4.74	6	▲1
Constitutional Democratic Party of Japan (CDP)	773,076	22.02	▲2.50	3	▲1
Japan Innovation Party (Ishin)	361,476	10.30	▲5.70	1	▲1
Komeito	322,535	9.19	▲0.31	1	0
Japanese Communist Party (JCP)	225,551	6.42	▲1.05	0	▼1
Democratic Party For the People (DPFP)	133,600	3.81	New	0	New
Reiwa Shinsengumi (Reiwa)	111,281	3.17	New	0	New
Social Democratic Party (SDP)	71,185	2.03	▼0.49	0	0
NHK Party	43,529	1.24	New	0	New
Total	3,510,613	100.00		11	
Invalid votes	104,515	2.89			
Turnout	3,615,128	59.59	▲0.27		
Registered voters	6,066,179				

=== 2017 ===
2017 results in the Hokuriku-Shin'etsu PR block
Party	Votes	Swing	%	Seats	+/–
Liberal Democratic Party (LDP)	1,328,838	37.09	▲0.96	5	0
Constitutional Democratic Party of Japan (CDP)	699,426	19.52	New	2	New
Kibō no Tō	688,924	19.23	New	2	New
Komeito	318,050	8.88	▼0.56	1	0
Japanese Communist Party (JCP)	267,777	7.47	▼2.67	1	0
Japan Innovation Party (Ishin)	164,714	4.60	New	0	New
Social Democratic Party (SDP)	90,218	2.52	▼0.68	0	0
Happiness Realization Party (HRP)	25,064	0.70	▲0.07	0	0
Total	3,583,011	100.00		11	
Invalid votes	102,239	2.77			
Turnout	3,685,250	59.32	▲7.42		
Registered voters	6,212,107				

=== 2014 ===
2014 results in the Hokuriku-Shin'etsu PR block
Party	Votes	Swing	%	Seats	+/–
Liberal Democratic Party (LDP)	1,122,585	36.13	▲4.44	5	▲1
Democratic Party of Japan (DPJ)	690,721	22.23	▲3.63	3	▲1
Japan Innovation Party (JIP)	432,249	13.91	▼5.38	1	▼2
Japanese Communist Party (JCP)	315,071	10.14	▲4.41	1	▲1
Komeito	293,194	9.44	▲1.06	1	0
Social Democratic Party (SDP)	99,242	3.19	▼0.31	0	0
People's Life Party (PLP)	75,981	2.45	New	0	New
Party for Future Generations	58,361	1.88	New	0	New
Happiness Realization Party (HRP)	19,619	0.63	▲0.20	0	0
Total	3,107,023	100.00		11	
Invalid votes	83,684	2.62			
Turnout	3,190,707	51.90	▼8.96		
Registered voters	6,147,926				

=== 2012 ===
2012 results in the Hokuriku-Shin'etsu PR block
Party	Votes	Swing	%	Seats	+/–
Liberal Democratic Party (LDP)	1,162,095	31.69	▲2.20	4	0
Japan Restoration Party (JRP)	707,497	19.29	New	3	New
Democratic Party of Japan (DPJ)	682,159	18.60	▼25.81	2	▼4
Komeito	307,138	8.38	▲1.01	1	0
Your Party	275,399	7.51	New	1	New
Japanese Communist Party (JCP)	210,219	5.73	▼0.35	0	0
Tomorrow Party of Japan (TPJ)	178,403	4.86	New	0	New
Social Democratic Party (SDP)	128,443	3.50	▼1.50	0	0
Happiness Realization Party (HRP)	15,767	0.43	▼0.28	0	0
Total	3,667,120	100.00		11	
Invalid votes	98,237	2.61			
Turnout	3,765,357	60.86	▼13.64		
Registered voters	6,186,543				

=== 2009 ===
2009 results in the Hokuriku-Shin'etsu PR block
Party	Votes	Swing	%	Seats	+/–
Democratic Party of Japan (DPJ)	2,007,770	44.41	▲11.89	6	▲2
Liberal Democratic Party (LDP)	1,333,082	29.49	▼8.81	4	▼1
Komeito	333,084	7.37	▼1.90	1	0
Japanese Communist Party (JCP)	274,816	6.08	▼0.66	0	0
People's New Party (PNP)	240,333	5.32	▼1.59	0	▼1
Social Democratic Party (SDP)	225,992	5.00	▼1.27	0	0
New Party Nippon (Nippon)	73,614	1.63	New	0	New
Your Party	32,312	0.71	New	0	New
Happiness Realization Party (HRP)	35,667	0.51	New	0	New
Total	4,521,003	100.00		11	
Invalid votes	123,766	2.66			
Turnout	4,644,769	74.50	▲3.02		
Registered voters	6,234,699				

=== 2005 ===
2005 results in the Hokuriku-Shin'etsu PR block
Party	Votes	Swing	%	Seats	+/–
Liberal Democratic Party (LDP)	1,665,553	38.30	▼0.59	5	0
Democratic Party of Japan (DPJ)	1,414,392	32.52	▼4.34	4	▼1
Komeito	403,203	9.27	▼0.84	1	0
People's New Party (PNP)	300,140	6.90	New	1	New
Japanese Communist Party (JCP)	293,045	6.74	▼0.48	0	0
Social Democratic Party (SDP)	272,649	6.27	▲0.64	0	0
Total	4,348,982	100.00		11	
Invalid votes	131,408	2.93			
Turnout	4,480,390	71.47	▲6.93		
Registered voters	6,268,572				

=== 2003 ===
2003 results in the Hokuriku-Shin'etsu PR block
Party	Votes	Swing	%	Seats	+/–
Liberal Democratic Party (LDP)	1,502,822	38.89	▲3.90	5	▲1
Democratic Party of Japan (DPJ)	1,424,537	36.86	▲11.53	5	▲2
Komeito	390,921	10.12	▲1.35	1	0
Japanese Communist Party (JCP)	278,939	7.22	▼1.96	0	▼1
Social Democratic Party (SDP)	267,096	6.91	▼3.45	0	▼1
Total	3,864,315	100.00		11	
Invalid votes	176,945	4.38			
Turnout	4,041,260	64.54	▼4.27		
Registered voters	6,261,164				

=== 2000 ===
2000 results in the Hokuriku-Shin'etsu PR block
Party	Votes	Swing	%	Seats	+/–
Liberal Democratic Party (LDP)	1,414,622	34.99	▼1.13	4	▼1
Democratic Party of Japan (DPJ)	1,024,328	25.34	▲12.64	3	▲1
Liberal Party (LP)	448,526	11.09	New	1	New
Social Democratic Party (SDP)	418,752	10.36	▲4.12	1	0
Japanese Communist Party (JCP)	371,247	9.18	▼0.76	1	0
Komeito	354,554	8.77	New	1	New
Liberal League (LL)	10,987	0.27	New	0	New
Total	4,043,016	100.00		11	▼2
Invalid votes	231,509	5.42			
Turnout	4,274,525	68.81			
Registered voters	6,211,855				

=== 1996 ===
1996 results in the Hokuriku-Shin'etsu PR block
Party	Votes	%	Seats
Liberal Democratic Party (LDP)	1,407,828	36.12	5
New Frontier Party (NFP)	1,180,904	30.30	4
Democratic Party (DP)	494,666	12.69	2
Japanese Communist Party (JCP)	387,664	9.95	1
Social Democratic Party (SDP)	243,287	6.24	1
New Party Sakigake (NPS)	125,694	3.22	0
New Socialist Party (NSP)	57,648	1.48	0
Total	3,897,691	100.00	13
