= 2021 Japanese general election in Hokuriku-Shinetsu =

- October 31, 2021

All 30 seats to the House of Representatives
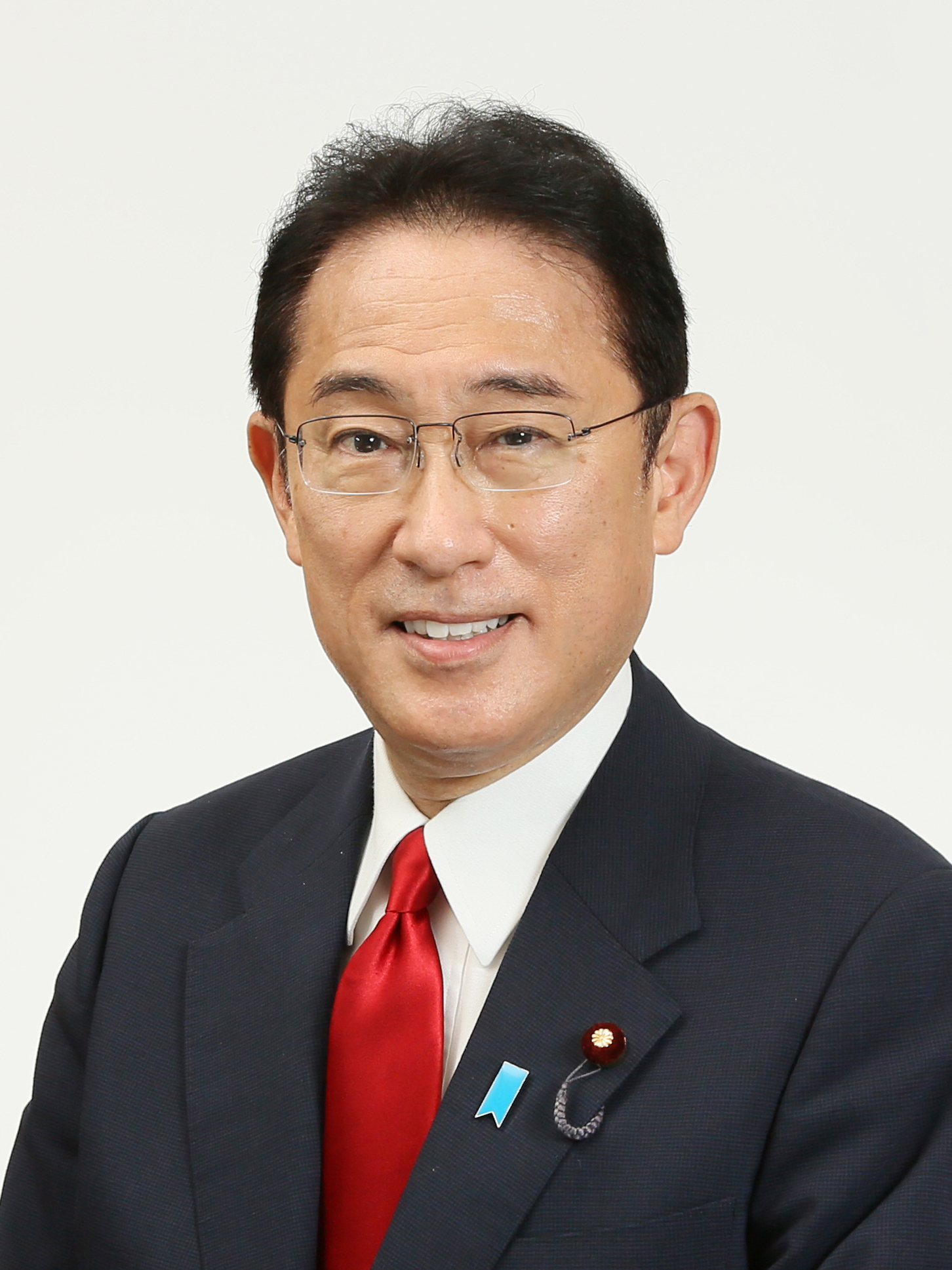

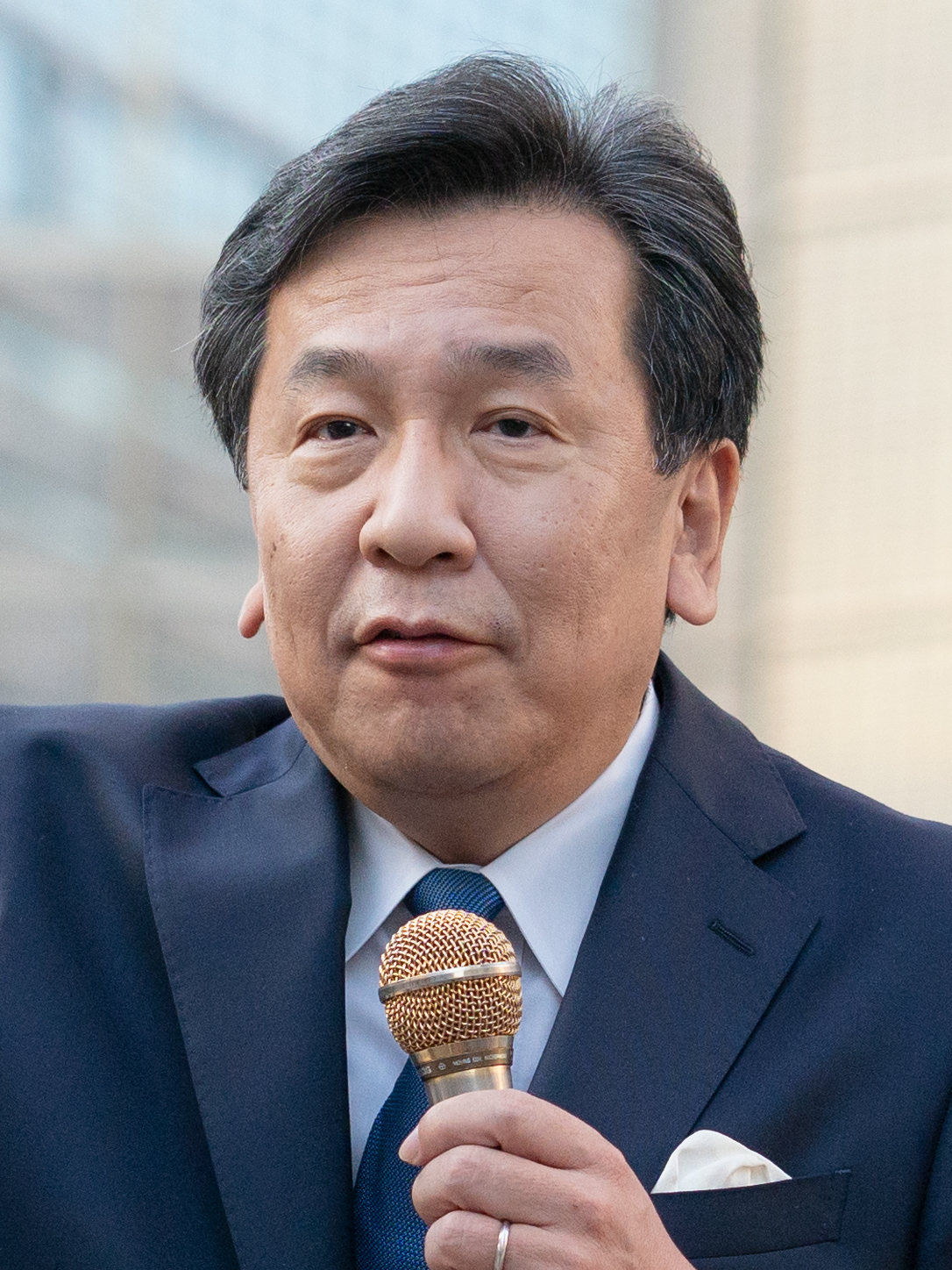

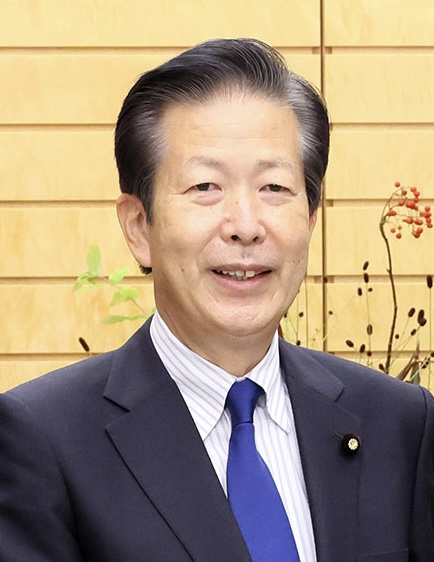

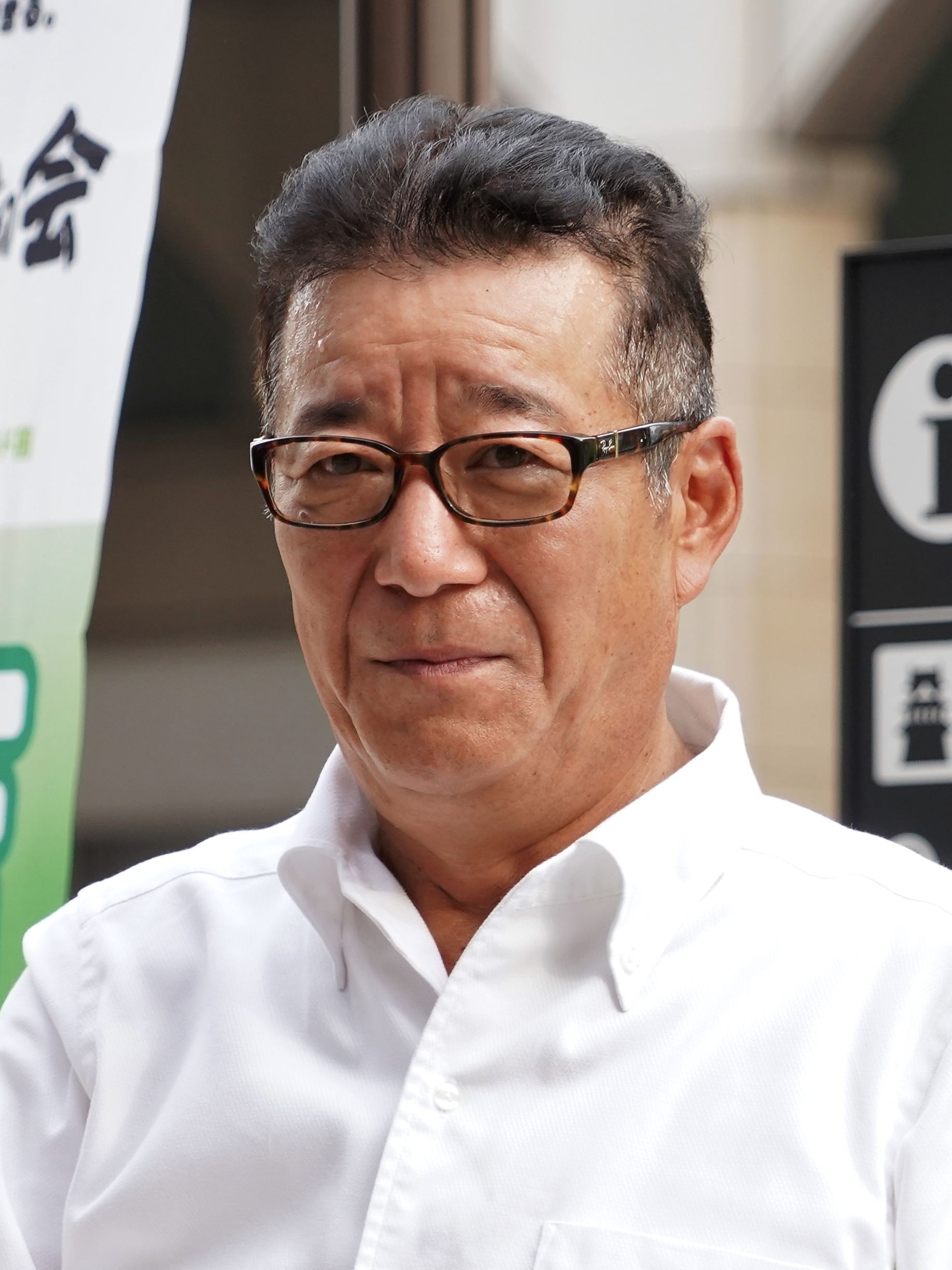
	Majority party	Minority party	Third party
Party	LDP	CDP	Komeito
Last election	17 seats	-	1 seats
Constituency	14	4	0
PR seats	6	3	1
Total	20	7	1
Seat change	▲3	New	Steady
	Fourth party	Fifth party
Party	Ishin	Independent
Last election	0 seats	4 seats
Constituency	0	1
PR seats	1	-
Total	1	1
Seat change	▲1	▼3

The 2021 Japanese general election in Hokuriku-Shinetsu were held on October 31, 2021, to elect the 30 representatives, one from each of 19 Electoral districts and 11 proportional seats.

== Results summary ==
Constituency		2017 result	2021 winning party				Votes						
Constituency		2017 result	Party	Votes	Share	Majority	LDP	CDP	Ishin	DPP	JCP	Other (Note: Includes all other parties, all independent candidates)	Total
Niigata	District 1	CDP	CDP	127,365	52.57%	30,744	96,591	127,365	18,333				242,289
Niigata	District 2	Ind	LDP	105,426	59.91%	68,629	105,426			37,157	33,399		175,982
Niigata	District 3	Ind	LDP	102,564	53.61%	13,820	102,564	88,744					191,308
Niigata	District 4	Ind	CDP	97,494	50.06%	238	97,256	97,494					194,750
Niigata	District 5	LDP	Ind	79,447	44.96%	18,610	60,837					115,869 (Note: Includes two independent candidates. (I) 79,447 (II) 36,422)	176,706
Niigata	District 6	LDP	CDP	90,679	49.57%	130	90,549	90,679				1,711	182,939

== Niigata 1st district ==
2021 Niigata 1st district election
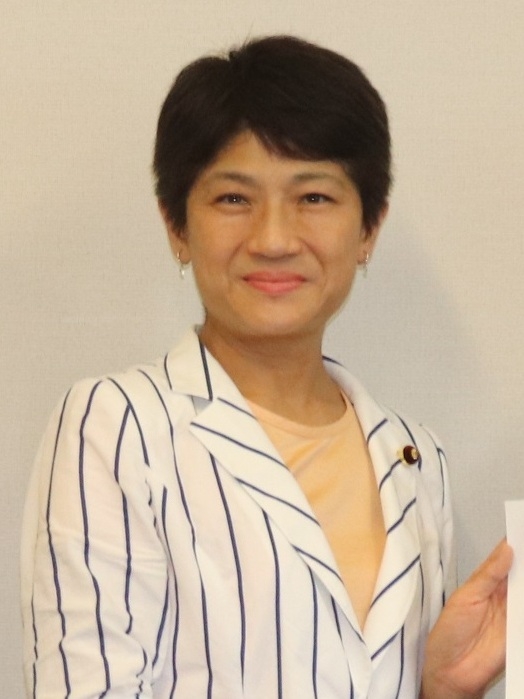

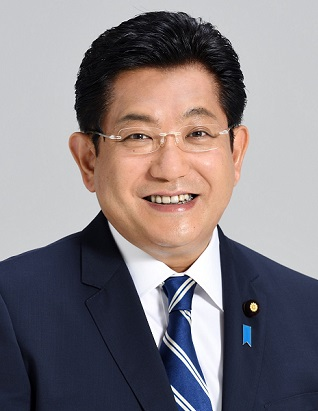
Nominee	Chinami Nishimura	Ichiro Tsukada	Tōru Ishizaki
Party	CDP	LDP	Ishin
Popular vote	127,365	96,591	18,333
Percentage	52.57%	39.87%	7.57%
Japanese Representative before election
Chinami Nishimura
CDP
Elected Japanese Representative
Chinami Nishimura
CDP

Incumbent				Elected Member	
Member	Party	First elected	Status	Member	Party
Chinami Nishimura	CDP	2003	Incumbent reelected.	Chinami Nishimura	CDP

== Niigata 2nd district ==
2021 Niigata 2nd district election
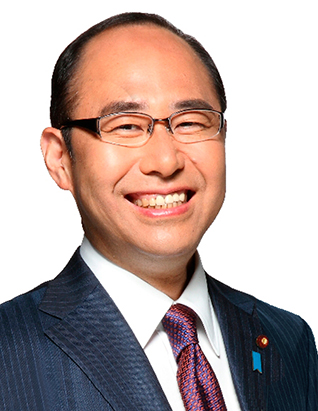
Nominee	Kenichi Hosoda	Sakae Takakura	Ayako Taira
Party	LDP	Democratic Party for the People	JCP
Popular vote	105,426	37,157	33,399
Percentage	59.91%	21.11%	18.98%
Japanese Representative before election
Eiichiro Washio
LDP
Elected Japanese Representative
Kenichi Hosoda
LDP

Incumbent				Elected Member	
Member	Party	First elected	Status	Member	Party
Eiichiro Washio	LDP	2005	Move to PR seat.	Kenichi Hosoda	LDP

== Niigata 3rd district ==
2021 Niigata 3rd district election
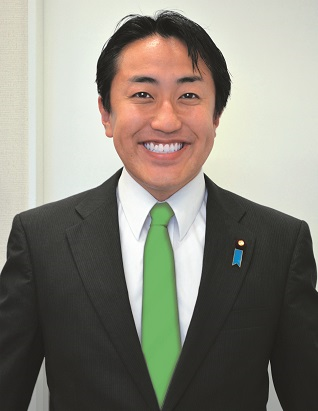

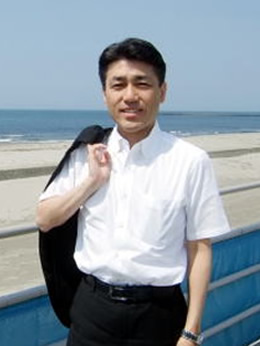
Nominee	Hiroaki Saito	Takahiro Kuroiwa
Party	LDP	CDP
Popular vote	102,564	88,744
Percentage	53.61%	46.39%
Japanese Representative before election
Takahiro Kuroiwa
CDP
Elected Japanese Representative
Hiroaki Saito
LDP

Incumbent				Elected Member	
Member	Party	First elected	Status	Member	Party
Takahiro Kuroiwa	CDP	2009	Incumbent defeated. (Won PR seat.)	Hiroaki Saito	LDP

== Niigata 4th district ==
2021 Niigata 4th district election
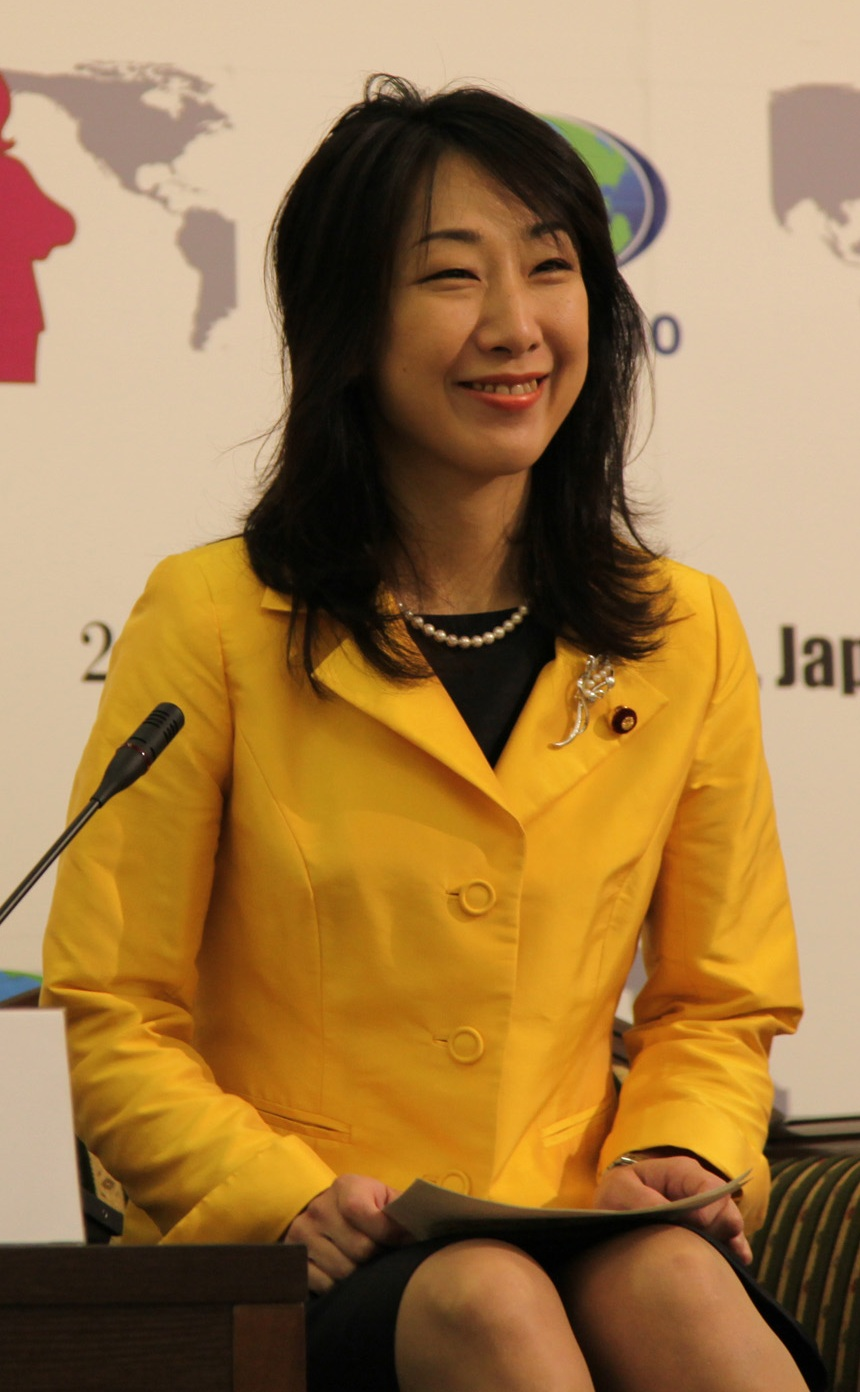

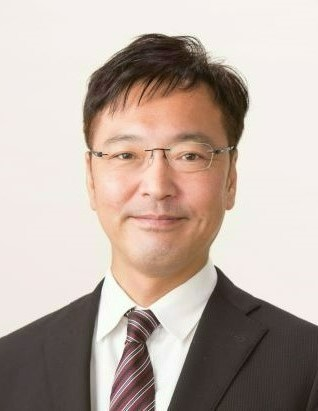
Nominee	Makiko Kikuta	Isato Kunisada
Party	CDP	LDP
Popular vote	97,494	97,256
Percentage	50.06%	49.94%
Japanese Representative before election
Makiko Kikuta
CDP
Elected Japanese Representative
Makiko Kikuta
CDP

Incumbent				Elected Member	
Member	Party	First elected	Status	Member	Party
Makiko Kikuta	CDP	2003	Incumbent reelected.	Makiko Kikuta	CDP

== Niigata 5th district ==
2021 Niigata 5th district election
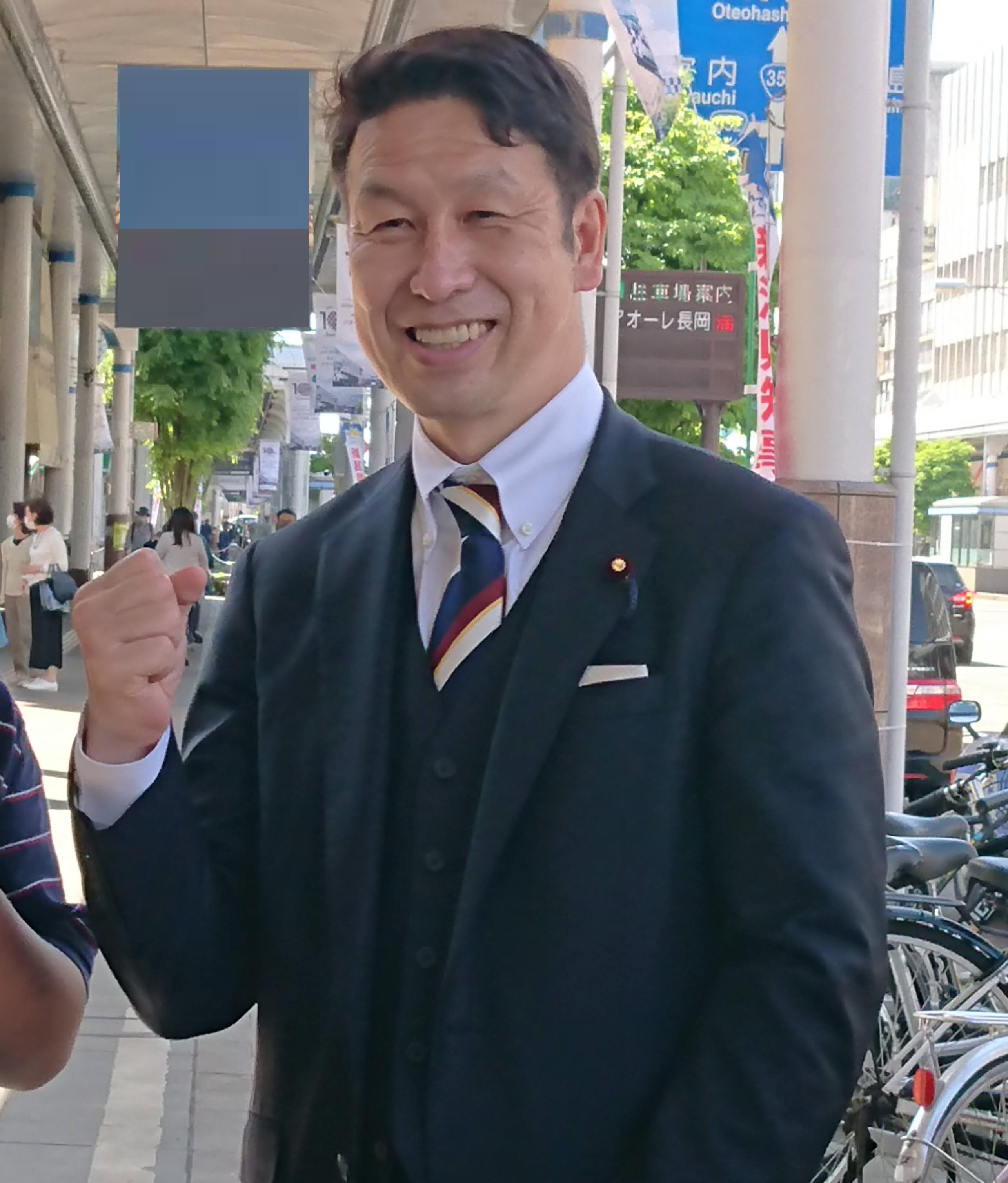

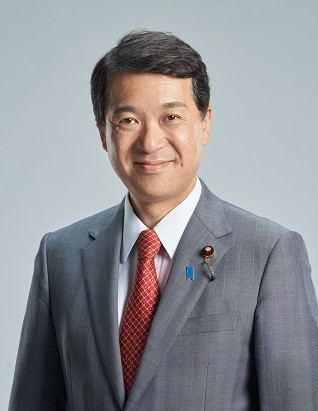
Nominee	Ryuichi Yoneyama	Hirohiko Izumida	Tamio Mori
Party	Independent	LDP	Independent
Popular vote	79,447	60,837	36,422
Percentage	44.96%	34.43%	20.61%
Japanese Representative before election
Hirohiko Izumida
LDP
Elected Japanese Representative
Ryuichi Yoneyama
Independent

Incumbent				Elected Member	
Member	Party	First elected	Status	Member	Party
Hirohiko Izumida	LDP	2017	Incumbent defeated. (Won PR seat.)	Ryuichi Yoneyama	Independent

== Niigata 6th district ==
2021 Niigata 6th district election
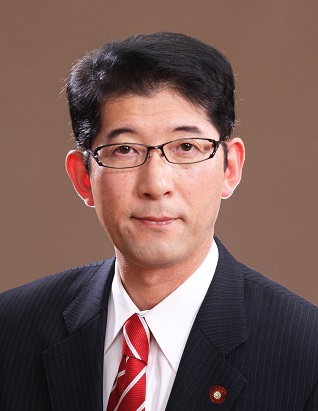
Nominee	Mamoru Umetani	Shuichi Takatori
Party	CDP	LDP
Popular vote	90,679	90,549
Percentage	49.57%	49.50%
Japanese Representative before election
Shuichi Takatori
LDP
Elected Japanese Representative
Mamoru Umetani
CDP

Incumbent				Elected Member	
Member	Party	First elected	Status	Member	Party
Shuichi Takatori	LDP	2005	Incumbent defeated. (Won PR seat.)	Mamoru Umetani	CDP

== Toyama 1st district ==
2021 Toyama 1st district election
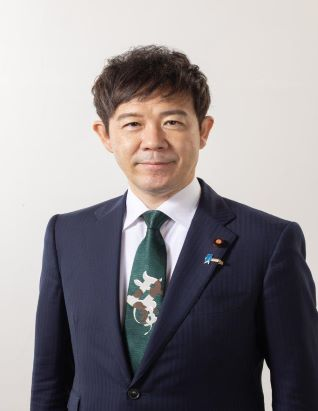
Nominee	Hiroaki Tabata	Toyofumi Yoshida	Masaei Nishio
Party	LDP	Ishin	CDP
Popular vote	71,696	45,411	14,563
Percentage	51.78%	32.79%	10.52%
Japanese Representative before election
Hiroaki Tabata
LDP
Elected Japanese Representative
Hiroaki Tabata
LDP

Incumbent				Elected Member	
Member	Party	First elected	Status	Member	Party
Hiroaki Tabata	LDP	2012	Incumbent reelected.	Hiroaki Tabata	LDP

== Toyama 2nd district ==
2021 Toyama 2nd district election
Nominee	Eishun Ueda	Yasuharu Koshikawa
Party	LDP	CDP
Popular vote	89,341	41,252
Percentage	68.41%	31.59%
Japanese Representative before election
Mitsuhiro Miyakoshi
LDP
Elected Japanese Representative
Eishun Ueda
LDP

Incumbent				Elected Member	
Member	Party	First elected	Status	Member	Party
Mitsuhiro Miyakoshi	LDP	1998 (by-el)	Incumbent retired. LDP hold.	Eishun Ueda	LDP

== Toyama 3rd district ==
2021 Toyama 3rd district election
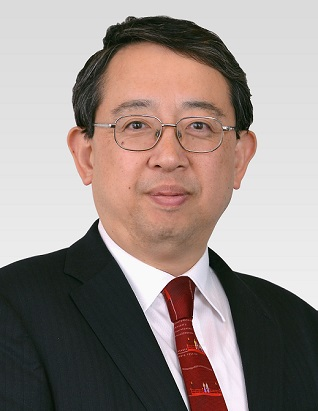
Nominee	Keiichiro Tachibana	Hiroshi Sakamoto
Party	LDP	JCP
Popular vote	161,818	44,214
Percentage	78.54%	21.46%
Japanese Representative before election
Keiichiro Tachibana
LDP
Elected Japanese Representative
Keiichiro Tachibana
LDP

Incumbent				Elected Member	
Member	Party	First elected	Status	Member	Party
Keiichiro Tachibana	LDP	2009	Incumbent reelected.	Keiichiro Tachibana	LDP

== Ishikawa 1st district ==
2021 Ishikawa 1st district election
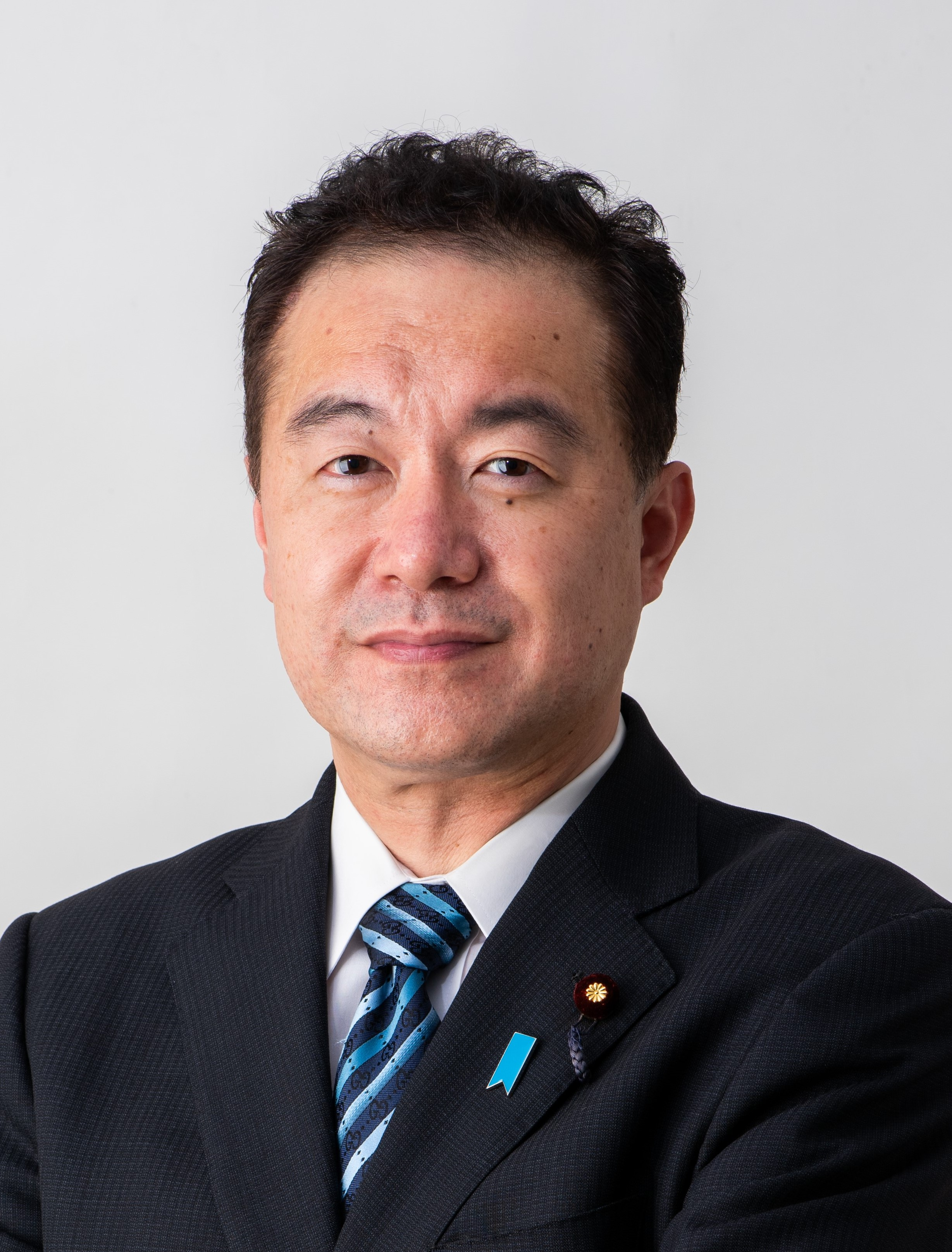
Nominee	Takuo Komori	Atsushi Arai	Makoto Kobayashi
Party	LDP	CDP	Ishin
Popular vote	88,321	48,491	45,663
Percentage	46.14%	25.33%	23.86%
Japanese Representative before election
Hiroshi Hase
LDP
Elected Japanese Representative
Takuo Komori
LDP

Incumbent				Elected Member	
Member	Party	First elected	Status	Member	Party
Hiroshi Hase	LDP	2000	Incumbent retired. LDP hold.	Takuo Komori	LDP

== Ishikawa 2nd district ==
2021 Ishikawa 2nd district election
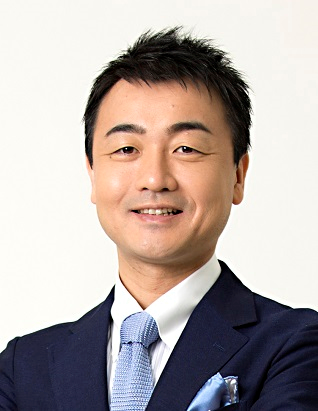
Nominee	Hajime Sasaki	Hiroshi Sakamoto	Yasuhiko Yamamoto
Party	LDP	JCP	Independent
Popular vote	137,032	27,049	10,632
Percentage	78.43%	15.48%	6.09%
Japanese Representative before election
Hajime Sasaki
LDP
Elected Japanese Representative
Hajime Sasaki
LDP

Incumbent				Elected Member	
Member	Party	First elected	Status	Member	Party
Hajime Sasaki	LDP	2012	Incumbent reelected.	Hajime Sasaki	LDP

== Ishikawa 3rd district ==
2021 Ishikawa 3rd district election
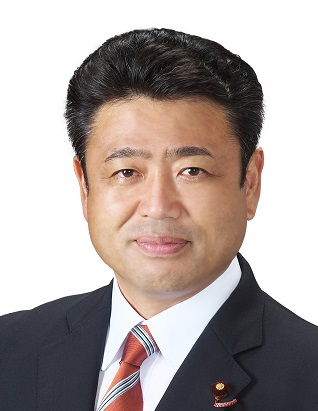
Nominee	Shoji Nishida	Kazuya Kondo
Party	LDP	CDP
Popular vote	80,692	76,747
Percentage	50.74%	48.26%
Japanese Representative before election
Shoji Nishida
LDP
Elected Japanese Representative
Shoji Nishida
LDP

Incumbent				Elected Member	
Member	Party	First elected	Status	Member	Party
Shoji Nishida	LDP	2017	Incumbent reelected.	Shoji Nishida	LDP

== Fukui 1st district ==
2021 Fukui 1st district election
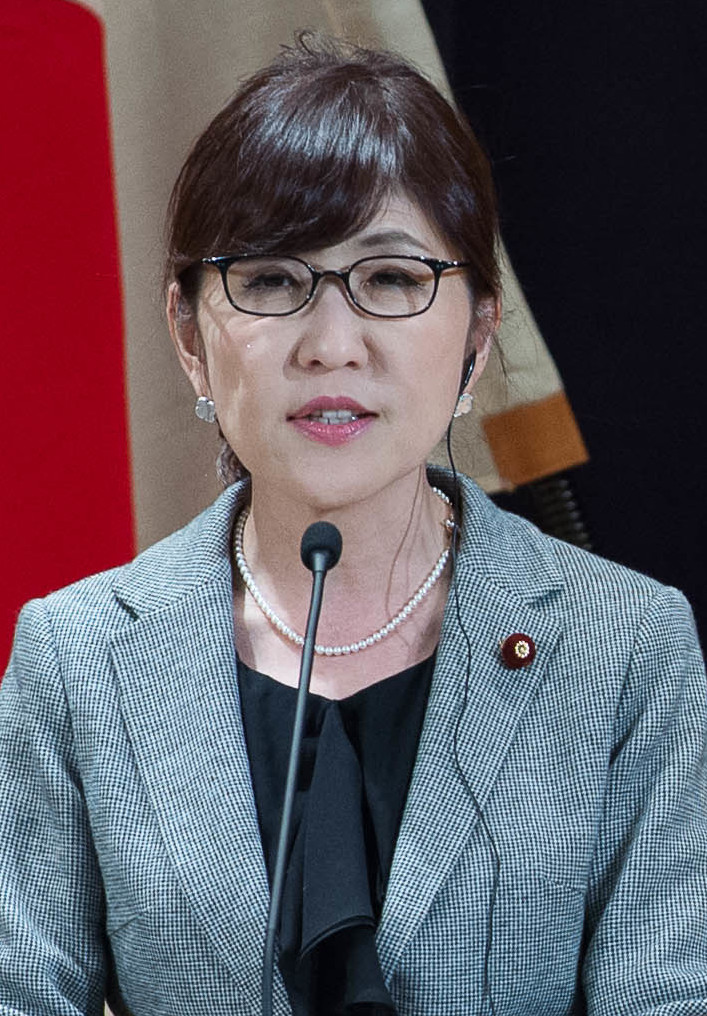
Nominee	Tomomi Inada	Tomihisa Noda
Party	LDP	CDP
Popular vote	136,171	71,845
Percentage	65.46%	34.54%
Japanese Representative before election
Tomomi Inada
LDP
Elected Japanese Representative
Tomomi Inada
LDP

Incumbent				Elected Member	
Member	Party	First elected	Status	Member	Party
Tomomi Inada	LDP	2005	Incumbent reelected.	Tomomi Inada	LDP

== Fukui 2nd district ==
2021 Fukui 2nd district election
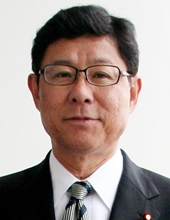
Nominee	Tsuyoshi Takagi	Takeshi Saiki
Party	LDP	CDP
Popular vote	81,705	69,984
Percentage	53.86%	46.14%
Japanese Representative before election
Tsuyoshi Takagi
LDP
Elected Japanese Representative
Tsuyoshi Takagi
LDP

Incumbent				Elected Member	
Member	Party	First elected	Status	Member	Party
Tsuyoshi Takagi	LDP	2000	Incumbent reelected.	Tsuyoshi Takagi	LDP

== Nagano 1st district ==
2021 Nagano 1st district election
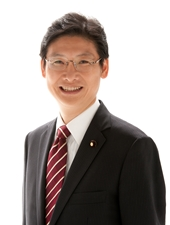

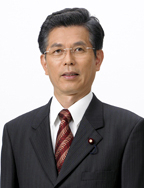
Nominee	Kenta Wakabayashi	Takashi Shinohara
Party	LDP	CDP
Popular vote	128,423	121,962
Percentage	51.29%	48.71%
Japanese Representative before election
Takashi Shinohara
CDP
Elected Japanese Representative
Chinami Nishimura
LDP

Incumbent				Elected Member	
Member	Party	First elected	Status	Member	Party
Takashi Shinohara	CDP	2003	Incumbent defeated. (Won PR seat.)	Kenta Wakabayashi	LDP

== Nagano 2nd district ==
2021 Nagano 2nd district election
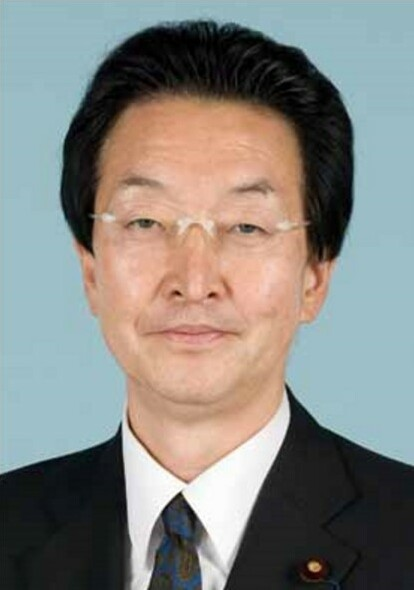

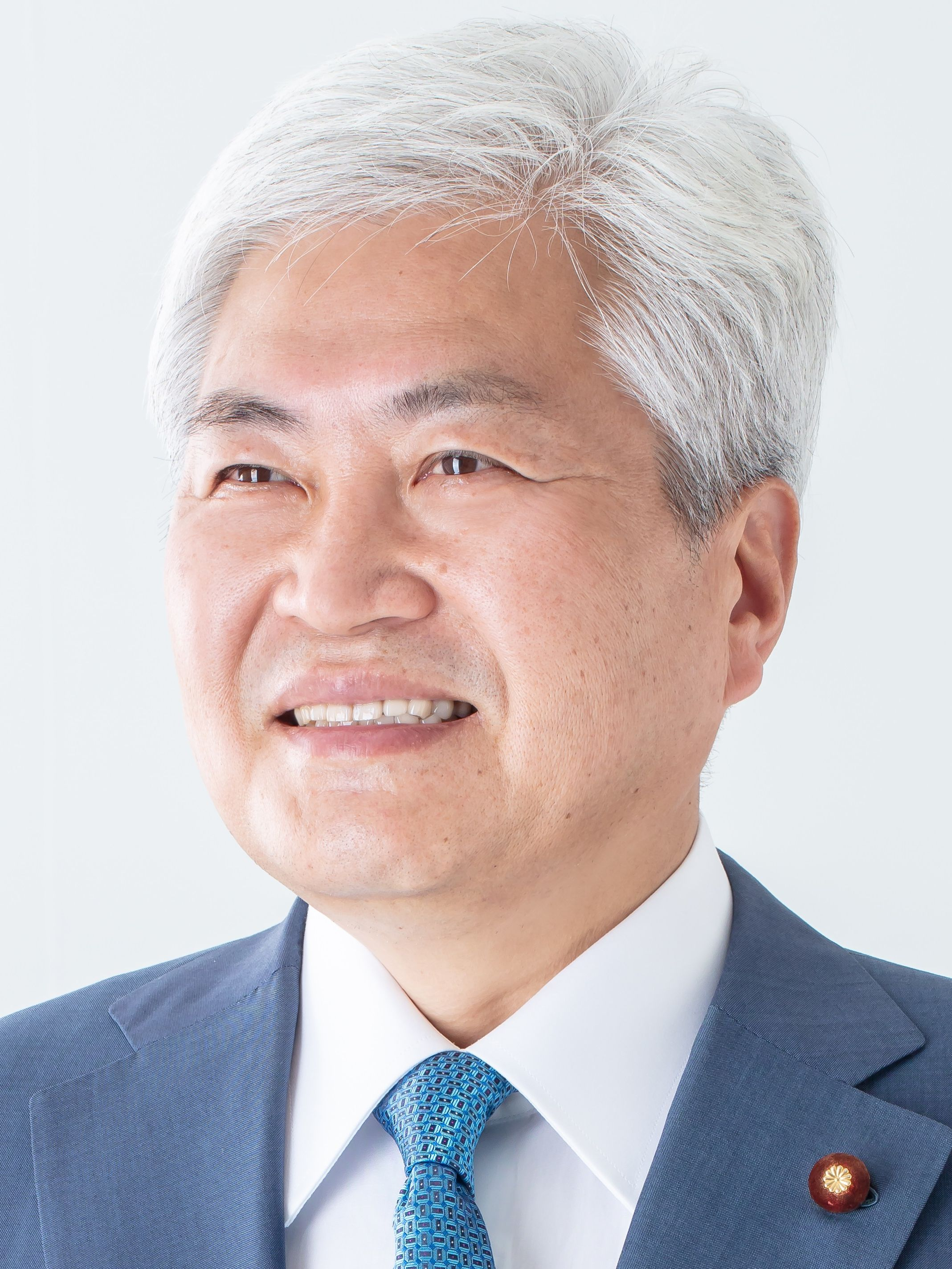
Nominee	Mitsu Shimojo	Shunsuke Mutai	Daisuke Tezuka
Party	CDP	LDP	Ishin
Popular vote	101,391	68,958	43,026
Percentage	47.52%	32.32%	20.16%
Japanese Representative before election
Mitsu Shimojo
CDP
Elected Japanese Representative
Mitsu Shimojo
CDP

Incumbent				Elected Member	
Member	Party	First elected	Status	Member	Party
Mitsu Shimojo	CDP	2003	Incumbent reelected.	Mitsu Shimojo	CDP

== Nagano 3rd district ==
2021 Nagano 3rd district election
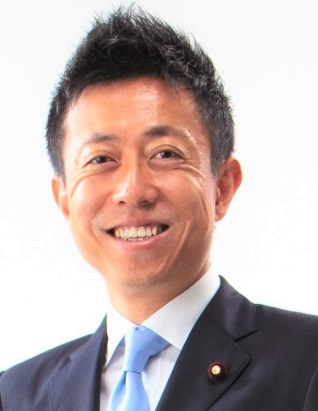
Nominee	Yosei Ide	Takeshi Kōzu
Party	LDP	CDP
Popular vote	120,023	109,179
Percentage	51.53%	46.87%
Japanese Representative before election
Yosei Ide
LDP
Elected Japanese Representative
Yosei Ide
LDP

Incumbent				Elected Member	
Member	Party	First elected	Status	Member	Party
Yosei Ide	CDP	2012	Incumbent reelected.	Yosei Ide	LDP

== Nagano 4th district ==
2021 Nagano 4th district election
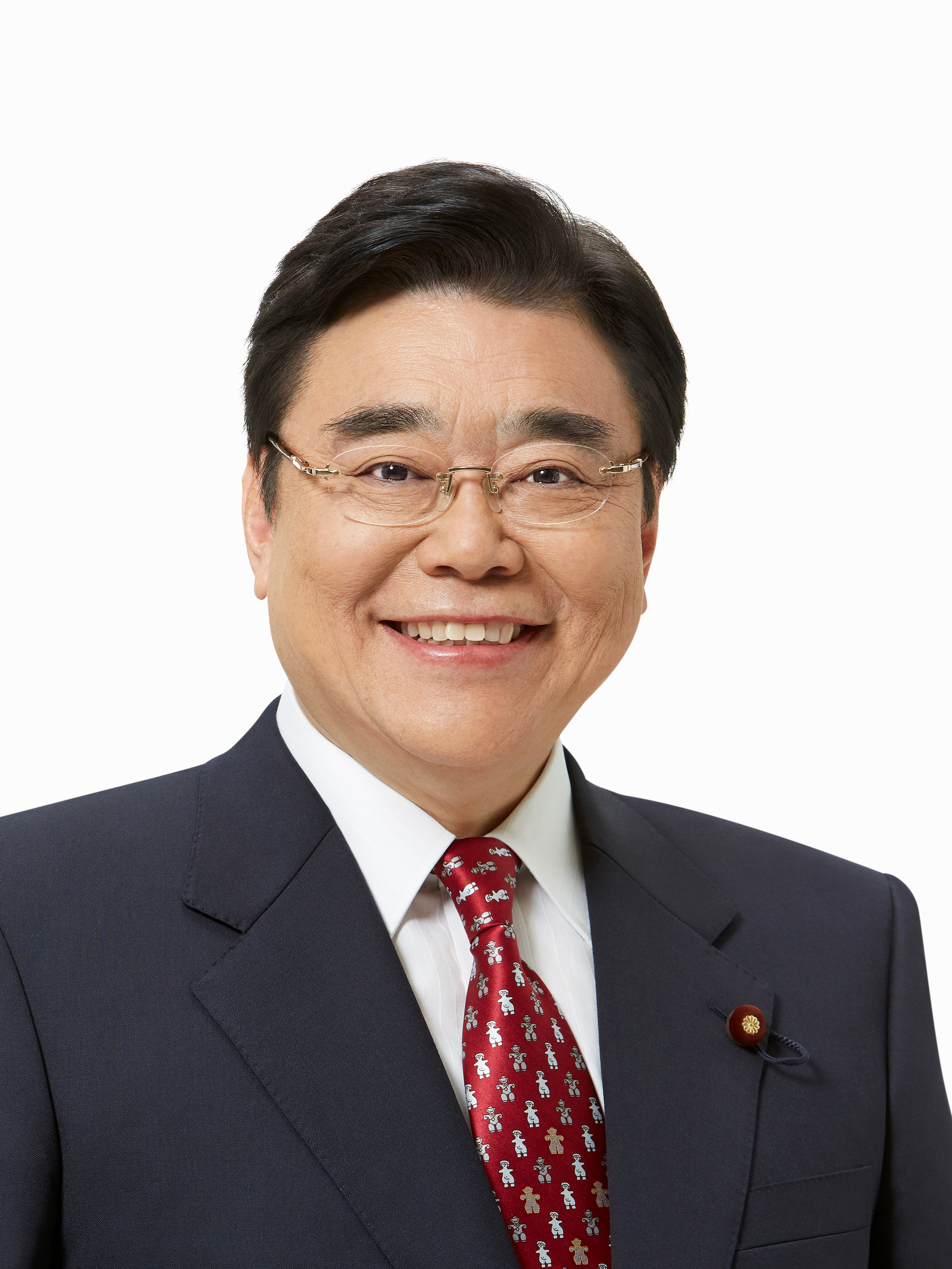
Nominee	Shigeyuki Goto	Yukiko Nagase
Party	LDP	JCP
Popular vote	86,962	51,922
Percentage	62.61%	37.39%
Japanese Representative before election
Shigeyuki Goto
LDP
Elected Japanese Representative
Shigeyuki Goto
LDP

Incumbent				Elected Member	
Member	Party	First elected	Status	Member	Party
Shigeyuki Goto	LDP	2000	Incumbent reelected.	Shigeyuki Goto	LDP

== Nagano 5th district ==
2021 Nagano 5th district election
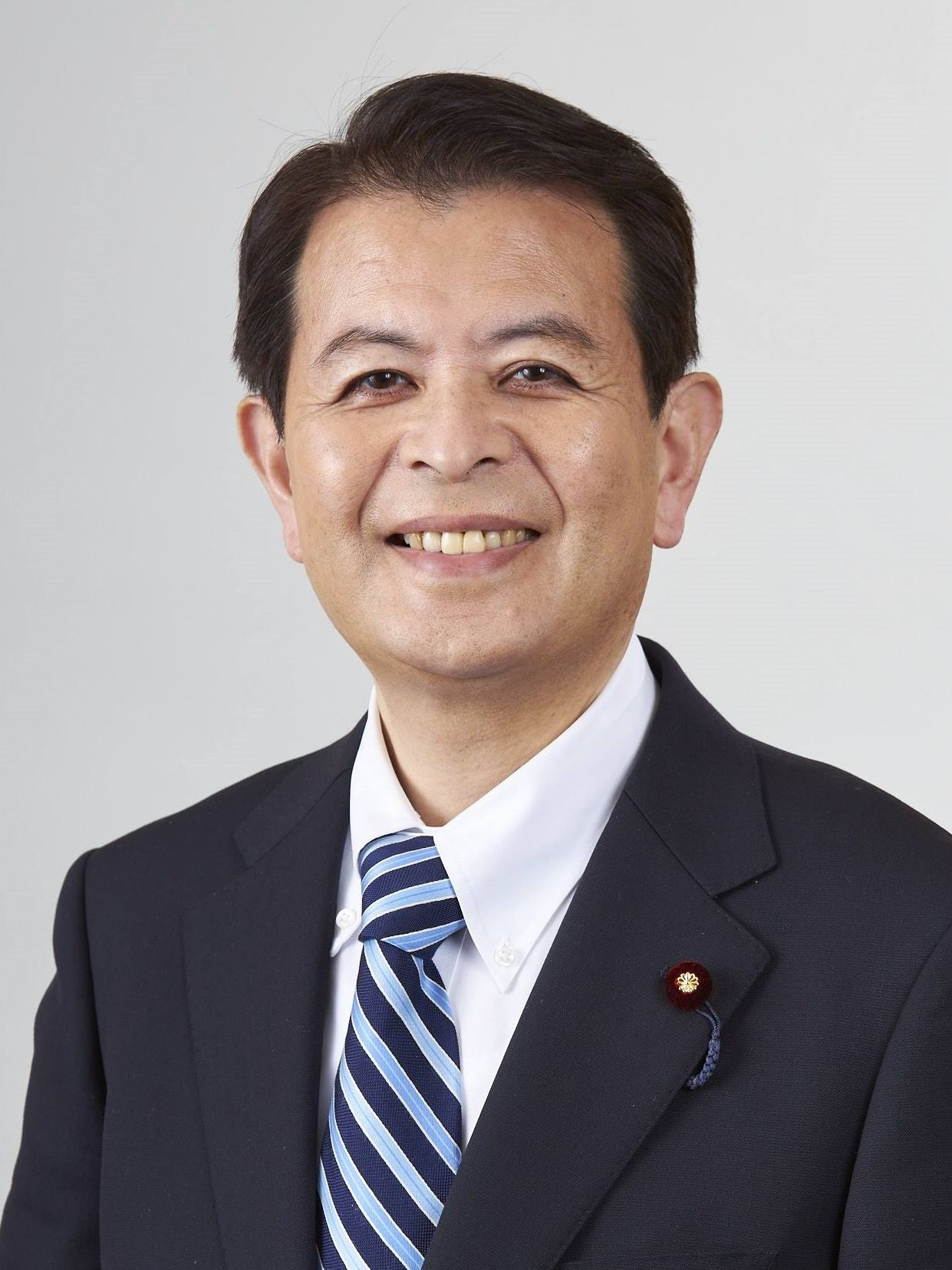
Nominee	Ichiro Miyashita	Itsuro Soga
Party	LDP	CDP
Popular vote	97,730	80,408
Percentage	54.86%	45.14%
Japanese Representative before election
Ichiro Miyashita
LDP
Elected Japanese Representative
Ichiro Miyashita
LDP

Incumbent				Elected Member	
Member	Party	First elected	Status	Member	Party
Ichiro Miyashita	LDP	2003	Incumbent reelected.	Ichiro Miyashita	LDP

== Proportional representation block ==
Proportional Representation block results
Party	Votes	Percentage	Seats
LDP	1,468,380	41.8%	6
CDP	773,076	22.0%	3
Ishin	361,476	10.3%	1
Komeito	322,535	9.2%	1
Communist	225,551	6.4%	0
DPP	133,599	3.8%	0
Reiwa	111,281	3.2%	0
SDP	71,185	2.0%	0
Anti-NHK	43,529	1.2%	0

Party	Elected Member	District
LDP	Eiichiro Washio	ー
LDP	Shuichi Takatori	Niigata 6th
LDP	Isato Kunisada	Niigata 4th
LDP	Hirohiko Izumida	Niigata 5th
LDP	Ichiro Tsukada	Niigata 1st
LDP	Shunsuke Mutai	Nagano 2nd
CDP	Kazuya Kondo	Ishikswa 3rd
CDP	Takashi Shinohara	Nagano 1st
CDP	Takeshi Kōzu	Nagano 3rd
Ishin	Toyofumi Yoshida	Toyama 1st
Komeito	Hiromasa Nakagawa	ー
