= Niigata 4th district =

Japanese electoral district

Niigata 4th District
- 新潟県第4区
- Parliamentary constituency for the Japanese House of Representatives
- Prefecture: Niigata
- Proportional Block: Hokuriku Shinetsu
- Electorate: 362,100 (as of 1 September 2022)

Current constituency
- Created: 1994
- Seats: One
- Party: LDP
- Representative: Eiichiro Washio

Niigata 4th District (新潟県第4区, Niigata-ken dai-yon-ku) is an electoral district of the Japanese House of Representatives, the lower house of the National Diet. The district is located in the Chūetsu region in central Niigata Prefecture and was created as part of the general move from multi-member districts to single-member districts in the House of Representatives.

== Areas covered ==
=== Current district ===
As of 2 February 2023, the areas covered by this district are as follows:

- Nagaoka
- Kashiwazaki
- Ojiya
- Mitsuke
- Santō District
- Kariwa District

After the abolition of the 6th district, the districts boundaries changed significantly, it was moved to areas formerly covered by the 2nd and 5th districts.

=== Areas 2013–2022 ===
From the first redistricting in 2013 until the second redistricting in 2022, the areas covered by this district are as follows:

- Niigata
  - Parts of Kita (former town of Yokogoshi: due to the small number of eligible voters, their votes were also counted in Kōnan ward)
    - Central government office (Kosugi, Junimae and Yokogoe areas)
  - Parts of Higashi (former town of Kameda; however, there are no voters within)
    - Kameda Nakajima 4 within the Ishiyama branch office jurisdiction
  - Parts of Chūō (former town of Kameda; however, there are no voters within)
  - Parts of Kōnan (former towns of Yokogoshi and Kameda)
  - Akiha
  - Minami (former city limits of Shirone)
- Nagaoka (former city of Tochio and the former town of Nakanoshima
  - Tochio branch jurisdiction
  - Nakanoshima Branch jurisdiction (Oshikirigawara)
- Sanjō
- Kamo
- Mitsuke
- Minamikanbara District

=== Areas from before 2013 ===
From 1996 until the first redistricting in 2013, the areas covered by this district were as follows:

- Sanjo City
- Niitsu City
- Kamo City
- Mitsuke City
- Tochio City
- Shirane City
- Nakakanbara District
  - Kosudo
  - Yokogoshi
  - Kameda
- Minamikabara District

In 2002, the redistricting did not change the borders of the district, but did change the official designation of Yokogoshi to recognise its official incorporation as a town in between the creation of the district and the redistricting.

== Elected representatives ==
Representative	Party	Years served	Notes
Hirohisa Kurihara	LDP	1996-2003	Won re-election in the 2000 general election, but failed to win re-election in the 2003 general election
Makiko Kikuta	DPJ	2003-2012	won re-election in the 2005 and 2009 general elections, and was elected to the Hokuriku Shinetsu PR district in the 2012 general election
Megumi Kaneko	LDP	2012-2017	Failed to win re-election in the 2017 general election
Makiko Kikuta	Indep.	2017 – 2020	Joined the CDP in 2020 along with 149 other representatives
Makiko Kikuta	CDP	2020 – 2024	Moved to the 2nd district
Ryuichi Yoneyama	CDP	2024 – 2026	Moved from the 5th district
Eiichiro Washio	LDP	2026 –	

== Election results ==
‡ - Also ran for a seat in the Hokuriku Shinetsu PR block

‡‡ - Also ran for and won in the Hokuriku Shinetsu PR block

=== Elections in the 2020s ===
2026
Party	Candidate	Votes	%	±%
LDP	Eiichiro Washio^{‡}	107,128	53.6	▲19.3
Centrist Reform	Ryuichi Yoneyama^{‡}	62,446	31.2	▼13.7
DPP	Nomura Taiki	15,842	7.9	
Sanseitō	Hisano Ooya	14,613	7.3	
Registered electors		347,604		
Turnout		200,029	58.44	▼1.86
LDP gain from Centrist Reform				

2024
Party	Candidate	Votes	%	±%
CDP	Ryuichi Yoneyama^{‡}	93,764	44.9	▼5.2
LDP	Eiichiro Washio^{‡}	71,672	34.3	▼15.6
Independent	Hirohiko Izumida	43,396	20.8	
Registered electors		352,778		
Turnout			60.30	▼3.87
CDP hold				

2021
Party	Candidate	Votes	%	±%
CDP	Makiko Kikuta^{‡} (incumbent) (endorsed by the JCP and the SDP)	97,494	50.1	New
LDP	Isato Kunisada^{‡‡} (endorsed by Komeito)	97,256	49.9	▲6.2
Registered electors		307,471		
Majority		238	0.2	▼12.4
Turnout		197,304	64.2	▲0.1
CDP gain from Independent				

=== Elections in the 2010s ===
2017
Party	Candidate	Votes	%	±%
Independent	Makiko Kikuta (incumbent - Hokuriku Shinetsu PR) (endorsed by the JCP, SDP and the Liberal Party)	112,600	56.3	New
LDP	Megumi Kaneko^{‡} (incumbent) (endorsed by Komeito)	87,524	43.7	▼3.0
Registered electors		317,754		
Majority		35,076	12.6	New
Turnout		203,585	64.1	▲10.8
Independent gain from LDP				

2014
Party	Candidate	Votes	%	±%
LDP	Megumi Kaneko^{‡} (incumbent) (endorsed by Komeito)	77,137	46.7	▲4.1
Democratic	Makiko Kikuta^{‡‡} (incumbent - Hokuriku Shinetsu PR)	74,073	44.9	▲8.3
JCP	Hiroshi Nishizawa	13,957	8.5	▲3.3
Registered electors		316,172		
Majority		3,067	1.9	▼5.5
Turnout		168,488	53.3	▼7.5
LDP hold		Swing	▲5.4	

2012
Party	Candidate	Votes	%	±%
LDP	Megumi Kaneko^{‡} (endorsed by Komeito)	80,514	42.6	▲6.7
Democratic	Makiko Kikuta^{‡‡} (incumbent) (endorsed by the PNP)	66,457	35.2	▼27.3
Restoration	Hirohisa Kurihara^{‡}	32,181	17.0	New
JCP	Hiroshi Nishizawa	9,908	5.2	New
Registered electors		318,807		
Majority		14,057	7.4	New
Turnout		193,771	60.8	▼12.5
LDP gain from Democratic		Swing	▲6.1	

=== Elections in the 2000s ===
2009
Party	Candidate	Votes	%	±%
Democratic	Makiko Kikuta^{‡} (incumbent)	144,230	62.5	▲12.0
LDP	Hiroshi Kurihara^{‡}	82,826	35.9	▼5.4
Happiness Realization	Tsuyoshi Sekiya	3,660	1.6	New
Registered electors		321,921		
Majority		61,404	26.6	▲17.4
Turnout		235,936	73.3	▲1.3
Democratic hold		Swing	▲7.5	

2005
Party	Candidate	Votes	%	±%
Democratic	Makiko Kikuta^{‡} (incumbent)	114,843	50.5	▼3.0
LDP	Hiroshi Kurihara^{‡}	93,971	41.3	▲1.7
JCP	Motomi Mutou	18,503	8.1	▲1.1
Registered electors		322,023		
Majority		20,872	9.2	▼4.7
Turnout		231,889	72.0	▲4.5
Democratic hold		Swing	▼15.0	

2003
Party	Candidate	Votes	%	±%
Democratic	Makiko Kikuta^{‡}	113,721	53.5	▲27.0
LDP	Hirohisa Kurihara^{‡} (incumbent)	83,880	39.6	▲6.4
JCP	Motomi Mutou	14,776	7.0	▼1.3
Registered electors		321,244		
Majority		29,391	13.9	New
Turnout		216,904	67.5	▼2.7
Democratic gain from LDP		Swing	▲13.5	

2000
Party	Candidate	Votes	%	±%
LDP	Hirohisa Kurihara^{‡} (incumbent)	72,604	33.2	▼8.4
Liberal	Makiko Kikuta^{‡}	69,910	32.0	New
Democratic	Tomio Sakagami^{‡} (incumbent - Hokuriku Shinetsu PR)	58,008	26.5	New
JCP	Motomi Mutou	18,069	8.3	▲0.8
Registered electors				
Majority		2,694	1.2	▼9.9
Turnout			70.2	▲1.5
LDP hold		Swing	▼4.2	

=== Elections in the 1990s ===
1996
Party	Candidate	Votes	%	±%
LDP	Hiroshi Kurihara^{‡}	85,743	41.6	New
Independent	Hideo Watanabe	62,823	30.5	New
Democratic	Tomio Sakagami^{‡‡}	42,144	20.5	New
JCP	Norihiko Watanabe	15,408	7.5	New
Registered electors		310,721		
Majority		22,920	11.1	New
Turnout		213,434	68.7	New
LDP win (new seat)				
