= Common Test for University Admissions =

University entrance examination in Japan

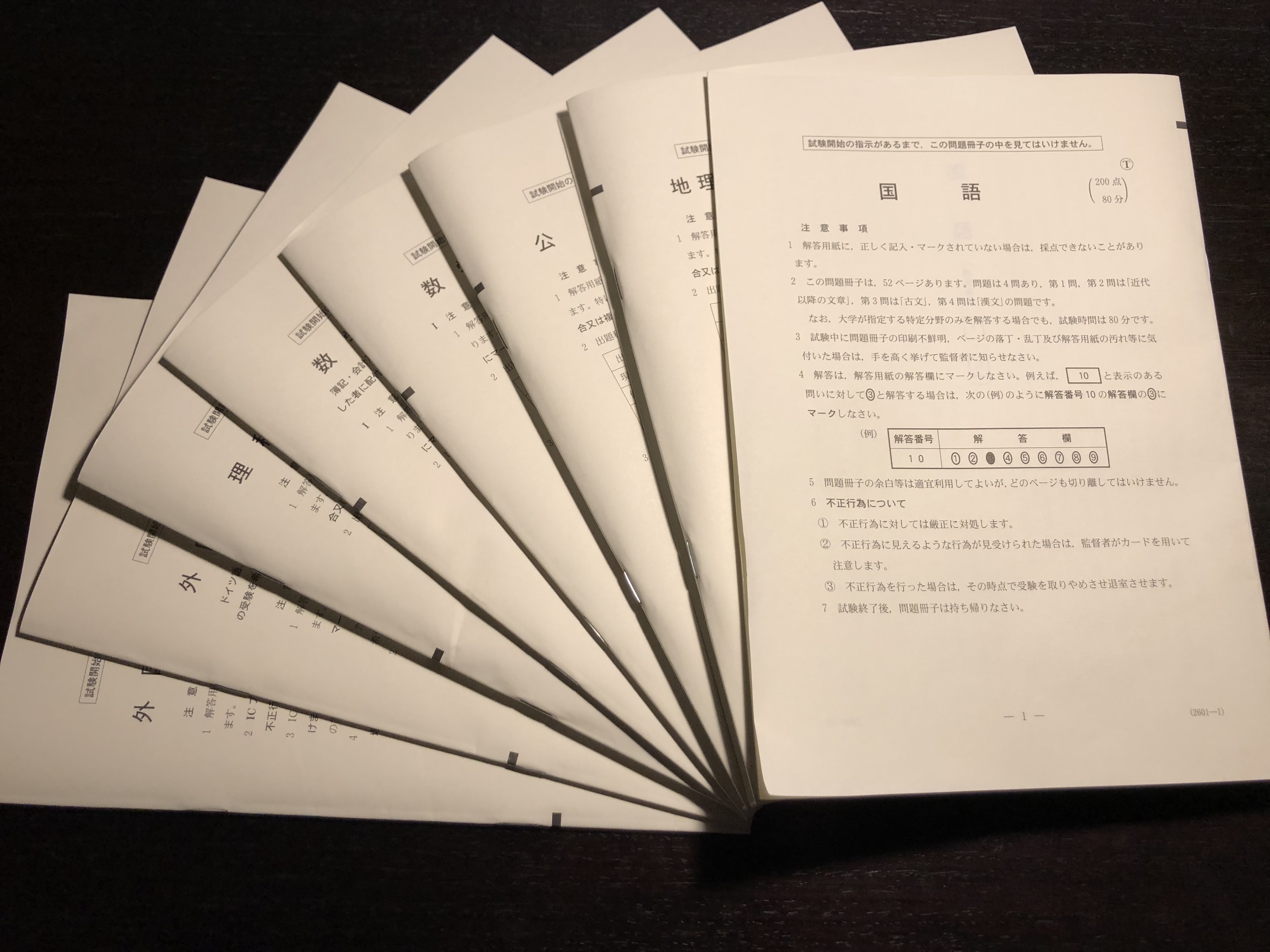
Exam booklets for the Common Test for University Admissions.

The Common Test for University Admissions (大学入学共通テスト, Daigaku Nyūgaku Kyōtsū Tesuto) is an entrance examination for Japanese universities, which was introduced in 2021 when it replaced the previous National Center Test for University Admissions. The exam is administered by the National Center for University Entrance Examinations (DNC).

The two-day test is held on the first Saturday and Sunday on or after January 13 of each year. The Common Test is currently applicable to third-year high school students.
