= Izumida =

Izumida (written: 泉田, 和泉田, or 出水田) is a Japanese surname. Notable people with the surname include:

- Hirohiko Izumida (泉田 裕彦, born 1962), Japanese politician
- Jun Izumida (泉田 純, born 1965), Japanese professional wrestler

== Fictional characters ==
- Azami Izumida (泉田 莇), a character in the video game A3!
- Touichirou Izumida (泉田 塔一郎), a character in the manga series Yowamushi Pedal
