= Muroi =

Muroi is a Japanese surname. Notable people with the surname include:

- Ichiei Muroi (born 1974), Japanese footballer
- Shigeru Muroi (born 1958), Japanese actress
- Kunihiko Muroi (born 1947), Japanese politician
- Yuzuki Muroi (born 1970), Japanese novelist, essayist, and tarento
