= Ryuichi Yoneyama =

Japanese politician

- 米山 隆一
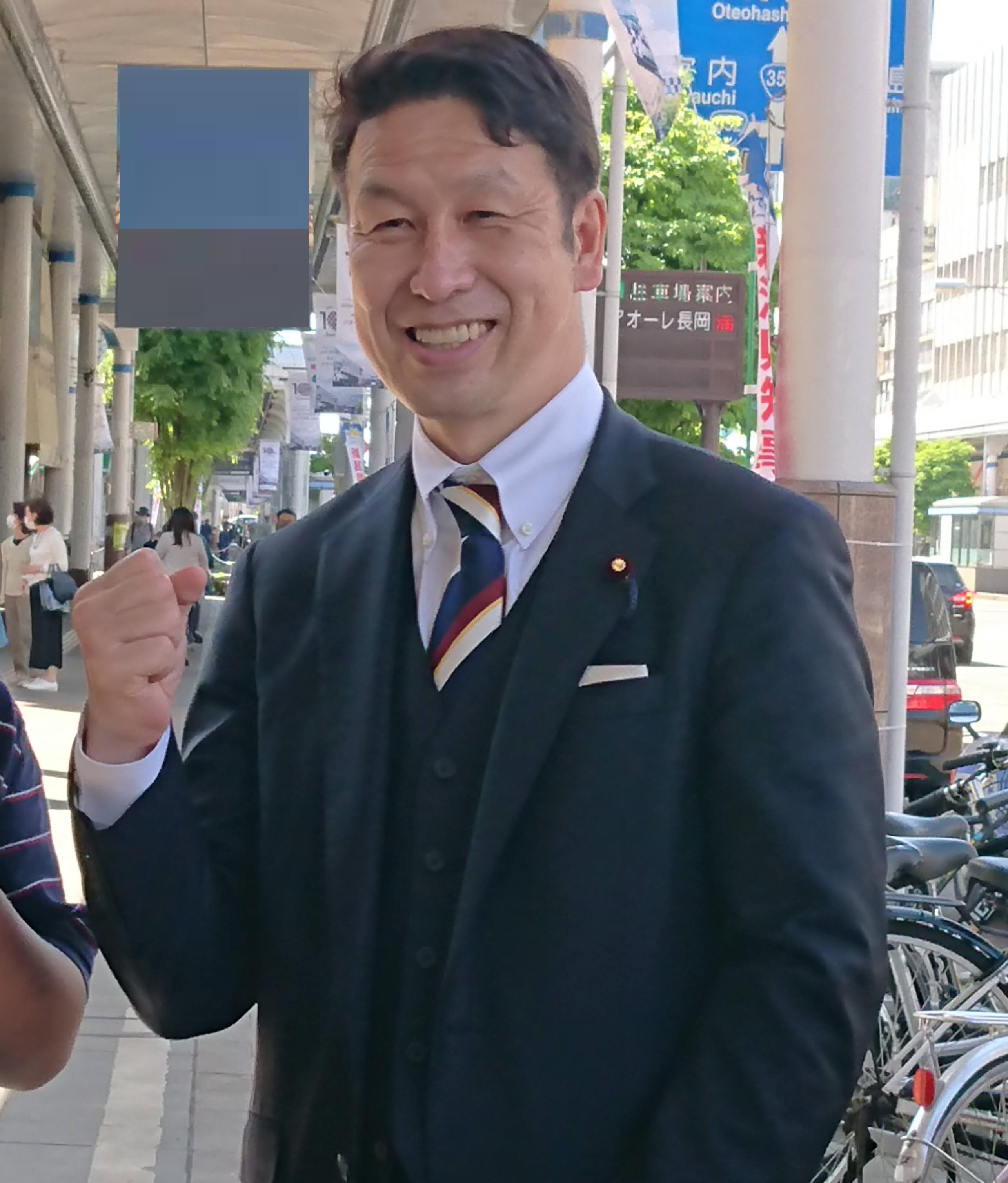
- Yoneyama in 2022

Member of the House of Representatives
- In office 3 November 2021 – 23 January 2026
- Preceded by: Hirohiko Izumida
- Succeeded by: Eiichiro Washio
- Constituency: Niigata 5th (2021–2024); Niigata 4th (2024–2026)

Governor of Niigata Prefecture
- In office 25 October 2016 – 27 April 2018
- Monarch: Akihito
- Preceded by: Hirohiko Izumida
- Succeeded by: Hideyo Hanazumi

Personal details
- Born: Ryūichi Aikō (愛甲 隆一); 8 September 1967 (age 59) Yunotani, Niigata, Japan (now Uonuma, Niigata)
- Party: CRA (since 2026)
- Other political affiliations: LDP (2005–2012); JRP (2012–2014); JIP (2014–2016); DP (2016); Independent (2016–2022); CDP (2022–2026)
- Spouse: Yuzuki Muroi (m. 2020)
- Education: University of Tokyo (PhD)
- Profession: Physician; Lawyer

Ryuichi Yoneyama (米山 隆一, Yoneyama Ryūichi; born 8 September 1967) is a Japanese politician and a former Governor of Niigata Prefecture. Prior to entering politics, Yoneyama worked as a radiology researcher at the University of Tokyo Hospital and was also trained as a lawyer.

== Early life and education ==
Ryuichi Yoneyama was born in Yunotani, Niigata (now Uonuma, Niigata), as Ryuichi Aiko (愛甲 隆一, Aikō Ryūichi); he changed his surname to Yoneyama when he entered middle school after his father was adopted into his mother's family. Yoneyama graduated from the prestigious Nada High School in 1986, ranking fifth among his cohort. He then took the Common First-Stage Examination for admission into the University of Tokyo and obtained 960 out of 1000 available points, the highest among his peers who had applied to the university. His high marks enabled him to enroll into the university's School of Medicine, where he graduated and obtained his doctor license in May 1992. After graduation, he worked for 3 years in the University of Tokyo Radiology Research Institute.

In 1997, Yoneyama took and passed a bar exam. He cited the arrogance of the university's law students as his motivation for taking the exam. He also took up some modules from the university's School of Economics and Medicine between 1998 and 2000 without officially enrolling into any degree. Yoneyama obtained a PhD from the University of Tokyo in 2003. Whilst working towards his PhD, he had several attachments at the National Institute of Radiological Sciences and Harvard University, and did research at the Massachusetts General Hospital. His experience in medical research led him to be appointed into a lectureship in healthcare policy at the university's Research Center for Advanced Science and Technology.

== Political career ==
=== First forays into politics ===
Yoneyama was recruited by the Liberal Democratic Party to become their candidate for the Niigata 5th district in the 2005 general election. Despite the party doing well across the country in the election, he was defeated by the longtime incumbent and popular former Foreign Minister Makiko Tanaka. He had a rematch with Tanaka in the 2009 election. Despite increasing his share of votes, Yoneyama was unable to overcome the Democratic Party of Japan landslide sweeping the country in the election.

In 2011, he started working as lawyer specialising in cases of medical malpractice. He contested the Niigata-5th seat in the 2012 election as a member of the Japan Restoration Party (JRP), this time finishing third. In the 2013 House of Councillors election, the JRP fielded him as their candidate for the Niigata at-large district, finishing fourth behind the three incumbent Councillors. Yoneyama would follow the party in its two subsequent mergers, first into the Japan Innovation Party and later into the Democratic Party.

=== Governor of Niigata ===
Three-term Niigata Governor Hirohiko Izumida announced in 2016 that he was not running for another term in that year's election. This triggered a scramble among the major parties to find candidates for the coveted position. Niigata was not spared by the strong anti-nuclear sentiments sweeping across the country, particularly due to the presence of the Kashiwazaki-Kariwa Nuclear Power Plant in the prefecture. The power plant was run by TEPCO, the same company running the Fukushima Daiichi Nuclear Power Plant. The pro-nuclear camp spearheaded by the LDP supported the candidate of Mayor of Nagaoka Tamio Mori. In order to avoid splitting their votes, the opposition decided to coalesce towards one candidate for an election. Yoneyama was selected as the opposition's unity candidate, garnering the support of the SDP, LP and JCP. His candidacy was supported by the full force of opposition politicians, including DP president Renho, DP deputy president Kenji Eda, Niigata Councillor Naoki Kazama and newly elected Councillor Yuko Mori (not related to Tamio). Yoneyama won 16 October election by a 6% margin and was elected to public office for the first time in his career. His election was hailed as a major victory of the anti-nuclear power movement at that time.

Yoneyama pursued a very cautious approach towards restarting the Kashiwazaki-Kariwa power plant during his time in office. He established a nuclear advisory committee early on his term to review the power plant's safeguards and the prefecture's nuclear disaster preparedness. Despite the reactor restart being approved by the Nuclear Regulation Authority, Yoneyama strongly opposed TEPCO's effort for an immediate restart of the plant and declined to give the necessary authorisation for any operational resumptions. His strong opposition pitted him against the pro-nuclear Abe administration, who threatened to cut Niigata's 1.2 billion yen (about $10.6 million) worth of grants if the reactors were not restarted. He also occasionally criticised government ministers like Taro Aso.

In April 2018, reports surfaced that Yoneyama had been paying women he met in dating sites. Yoneyama admitted that the allegations were true. He confessed to paying money to the women to simply win their favours, but acknowledged that it could create the impression of buying sex. He submitted his resignation on 18 April and left office on 27 April. His resignation triggered an early gubernatorial election in June 2018 and the nuclear debate was expected to heavily feature in the campaign.

Yoneyama said that he hoped his nuclear policies would be continued by his successor. He also ruled out returning to politics in the short term.

=== Member of the Diet ===
In the 2021 election Yoneyama ran as an independent candidate in the Niigata 5th district and won a seat in the House of Representatives. Defeating his predecessor in the office of Governor, Hirohiko Izumida.

== Personal life ==
On 10 May 2020, Yoneyama married Yuzuki Muroi. His political idol is former Prime Minister Kakuei Tanaka. Tanaka is also incidentally the father of Makiko Tanaka, whom he fought against in several elections.
