= Makiko Tanaka =

Japanese politician (born 1944)

- 田中 眞紀子
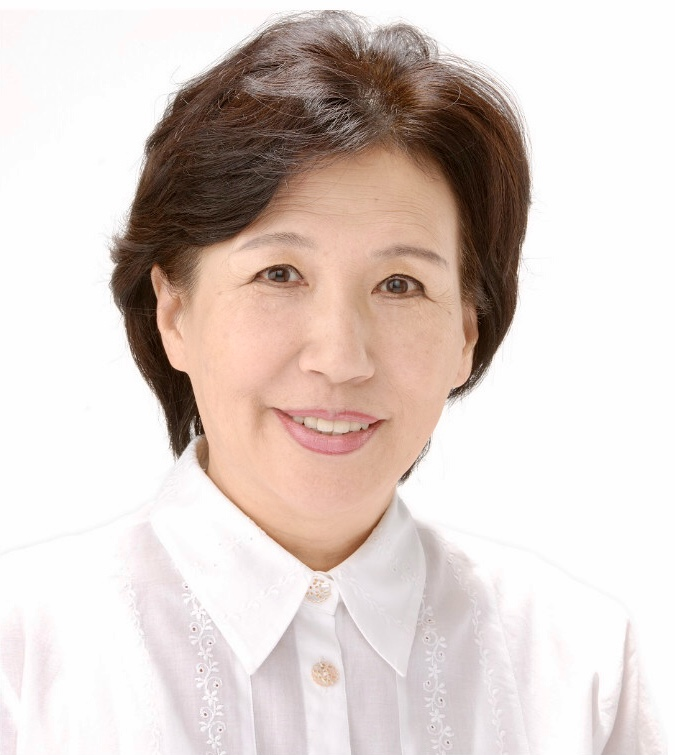
- Official portrait, 2012

Minister of Education, Culture, Sports, Science and Technology
- In office 1 October 2012 – 26 December 2012
- Prime Minister: Yoshihiko Noda
- Preceded by: Masaharu Nakagawa
- Succeeded by: Hakubun Shimomura

Minister of Foreign Affairs
- In office 26 April 2001 – 29 January 2002
- Prime Minister: Junichirō Koizumi
- Preceded by: Yōhei Kōno
- Succeeded by: Yoriko Kawaguchi

Director-General of the Science and Technology Agency
- In office 30 June 1994 – 8 August 1995
- Prime Minister: Tomiichi Murayama
- Preceded by: Mikio Ōmi
- Succeeded by: Yasuoki Urano

Member of the House of Representatives
- In office 10 November 2003 – 16 November 2012
- Preceded by: Yukio Hoshino
- Succeeded by: Tadayoshi Nagashima
- Constituency: Niigata 5th
- In office 18 July 1993 – 9 August 2002
- Preceded by: Hideo Watanabe
- Succeeded by: Yukio Hoshino
- Constituency: Niigata 3rd (1993–1996); Niigata 5th (1996–2002)

Personal details
- Born: 14 January 1944 (age 82) Bunkyō, Tokyo, Japan
- Party: Independent (2003–2009; 2018–present)
- Other political affiliations: LDP (1993–2003); DPJ (2009–2016); DP (2016–2018)
- Spouse: Naoki Suzuki (m. 1969)
- Children: 3
- Parent: Kakuei Tanaka (father)
- Education: Germantown Friends School
- Alma mater: Waseda University (B.Com.)

Makiko Tanaka (田中 眞紀子, Tanaka Makiko; born on 14 January 1944) is a Japanese politician. She is the daughter of former Prime Minister Kakuei Tanaka and his official wife Hana.

== Early life ==
Tanaka attended high school at Germantown Friends School in the United States and graduated from Waseda University. She spent most of her early adulthood working with her father's political machine Etsuzankai, and was first lady to her father since her mother, Hana, was absent due to long-standing illness. She was elected to the Lower House in 1993, shortly after her father's death.

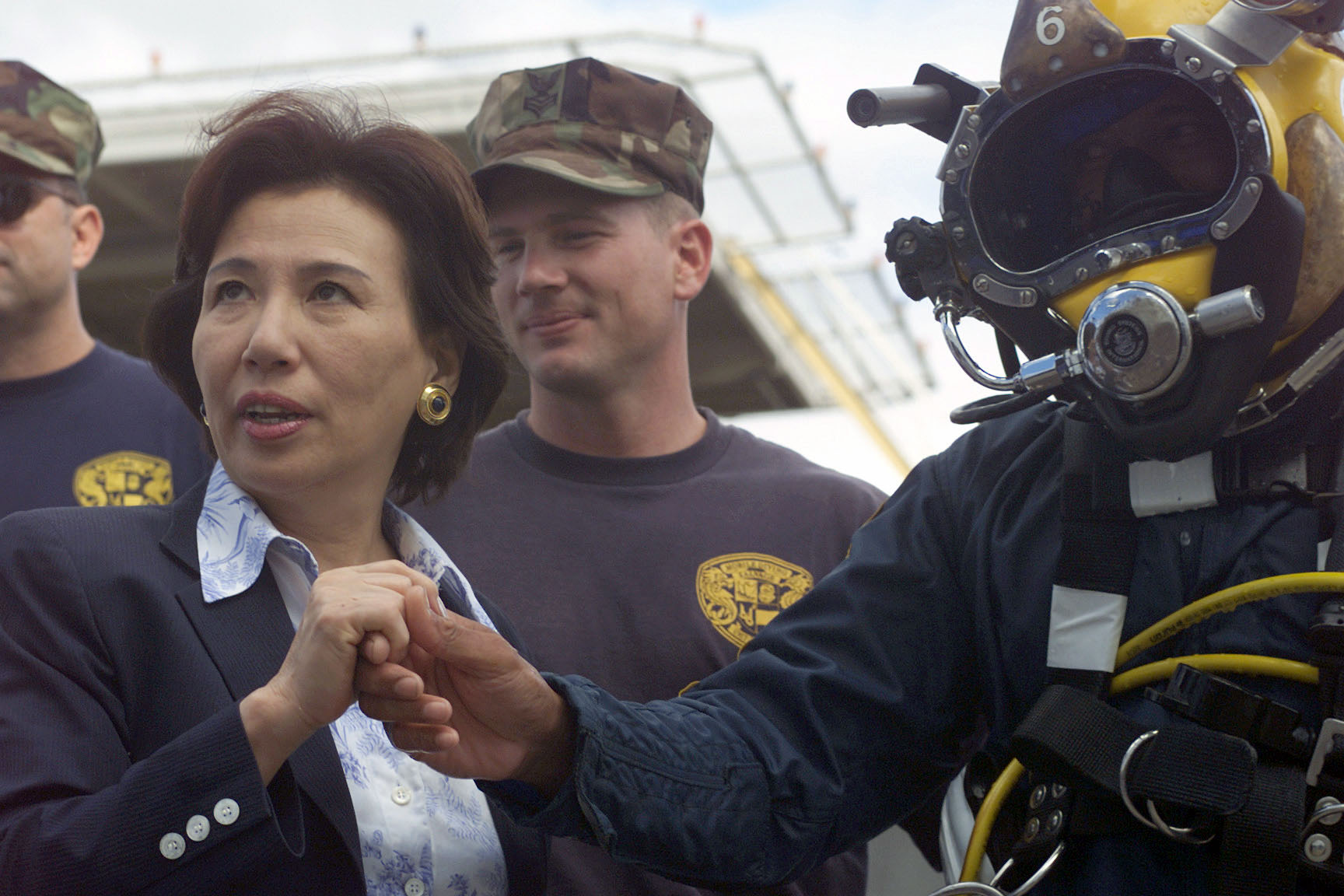
Makiko Tanaka (left) visits with the United States Navy dive team engaged in the salvage and recovery operation of Ehime Maru off Oahu, Hawaii on September 9, 2001.

== Career ==
Tanaka was the first female foreign minister of Japan, from April 2001 to January 2002, but was fired from the cabinet after making remarks critical of Prime Minister Junichiro Koizumi. Koizumi had also made indirect negative remarks toward Tanaka shortly before her removal as Foreign Minister. Later that year, she was expelled from the ruling Liberal Democratic Party (LDP) and barred from party membership for two years.

In August 2002, Tanaka resigned from the Diet after allegations that she had embezzled her secretaries' civil service salaries. A Tokyo court cleared her in September, and she ran for the Diet again as an independent in November 2003.

Her husband Naoki Suzuki, whom she married in 1969 was adopted as an adult into her family, because she has no brothers to carry on the family name.

In August 2009, Tanaka and her husband joined the opposition Democratic Party of Japan. In September 2009 she became the Diet chairperson of the Committee on Education, Culture, Sports, Science and Technology. In September 2011 she became the Diet chairperson of the Committee on Foreign Affairs. On 1 October 2012, she became Minister of Education, Culture, Science, Sports, and Technology, as part of a reshuffle of the Yoshihiko Noda Cabinet.

On 2 November 2012 she denied applications for three new universities, contradicting a report the previous day that had endorsed the establishment of the universities. It had been 30 years since a minister had contradicted the ministry in such a way. This sparked a large amount of criticism and after pressure from within the DPJ she reversed her decision and approved the applications.

She lost her seat in the 16 December 2012 general election. She left office on 26 December 2012.

== Publications ==
- (in Japanese) (with English abstract) Tanaka, Makiko. "The English Language Development Program of the Los Angeles Unified School District : Implications for Elementary School English Education in Japan." (カリフォルニア州ロサンゼルス統一学区における英語教育の試みと日本における小学校英語教育への示唆, Archive) The Journal of Kanda University of International Studies (神田外語大学紀要). Kanda University of International Studies. 2009, Volume 21.
  - Info page (Archive) at CiNii

Political offices
Preceded by Mikio Ōmi	Minister of state, director-general of the Science and Technology Agency; 1994–1995	Succeeded by Yasuoki Urano
Preceded by Yōhei Kōno	Minister of Foreign Affairs of Japan; 2001–2002	Succeeded by Yoriko Kawaguchi
Preceded by Takeshi Iwaya	Chair of the House of Representatives Committee on Education, Culture, Sports, Science and Technology; 2009–2011	Succeeded by Eiko Ishige
Preceded by Tadamasa Kodaira	Chair of the House of Representatives Committee on Foreign Affairs; 2011–2012	Succeeded by Yoshikatsu Nakayama
Preceded by Hirofumi Hirano	Minister of Education, Culture, Sports, Science and Technology; 2012	Succeeded by Hakubun Shimomura
House of Representatives (Japan)
Preceded by Kichinosuke Meguro; Hideo Watanabe; Yukio Hoshino; Shin Sakurai; Tatsuo Murayama	Member of the House of Representatives from Niigata 3rd district (multi-member); 1993–1996; Served alongside: Yukio Hoshino, Shin Sakurai, Tomio Sakagami, Tatsuo Murayama	District eliminated
New district	Member of the House of Representatives from Niigata 5th district (single-member); 1996–2002; 2003–2012	Vacant Title next held by Yukio Hoshino
Preceded by Yukio Hoshino	Member of the House of Representatives from Niigata 5th district (single-member); 1996–2002; 2003–2012	Succeeded by {{{after}}}
