= Nobutaka Tsutsui =

Japanese politician (1944–2026)

- 筒井 信隆
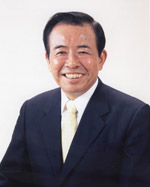

Member of the House of Representatives
- In office 25 June 2000 – 16 November 2012
- Preceded by: Osamu Takatori
- Succeeded by: Shuichi Takatori
- Constituency: Niigata 6th
- In office 18 February 1990 – 18 June 1993
- Preceded by: Katsuhiko Shirakawa
- Succeeded by: Katsuhiko Shirakawa
- Constituency: Niigata 4th

Personal details
- Born: 10 November 1944 Kawasaki, Kanagawa, Japan
- Died: 1 October 2026 (aged 81) Tokyo, Japan
- Party: Independent (1994–1998; 2021–2026)
- Other political affiliations: JSP (before 1994); DPJ (1998–2016); DP (2016–2017); CDP (2017–2021)
- Relatives: Mamoru Umetani (son-in-law)
- Education: Waseda University

Nobutaka Tsutsui (筒井 信隆, Tsutsui Nobutaka; 10 November 1944 – 1 October 2026) was a Japanese politician who served in the House of Representatives in the Diet (national legislature) as a member of the Democratic Party of Japan.

== Early life ==
Tsutsui was a native of Nakakubiki District, Niigata, and graduated from Waseda University.

== Political career ==
Tsutsui was elected for the first time in 1990 as a member of the Japan Socialist Party after an unsuccessful run in 1986.

== Libel case ==
In 2012, the Yomiuri Shimbun reported that Tsutsui had divulged secret information to a Chinese agricultural enterprise. Tsutsui sued the newspaper for libel, and was awarded 3.3 million yen in damages in 2015 on the basis that the truth of the allegations could not be confirmed.

== Death ==
Tsutsui died on 1 October 2026, at the age of 81.
