= Makiko Kikuta =

Japanese politician (born 1969)

- 菊田 真紀子
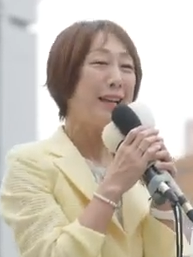
- Kikuta in 2024

Member of the House of Representatives; from Hokuriku-Shin'etsu
- Incumbent
- Assumed office 10 November 2003
- Preceded by: Hirohisa Kurihara
- Constituency: See list: Niigata 4th (2003–2012); PR block (2012–2017); Niigata 4th (2017–2024); Niigata 2nd (2024–2026); PR block (2026–present)

Personal details
- Born: 24 October 1969 (age 56) Fujioka, Gunma, Japan
- Party: DRP (since 2026)
- Other political affiliations: Independent (1995–2000; 2017–2020); LP (2000–2003); DPJ (2003–2016); DP (2016–2017); CDP (2020–2026); CRA (2026)
- Education: Heilongjiang University
- Website: Official website

Makiko Kikuta (菊田 真紀子, Kikuta Makiko; born 24 October 1969) is a Japanese politician who has served as a member of the House of Representatives since 2003.

== Biography ==
Makiko Kikuta was born on 24 October 1969 in Kamo, Niigata. Her father and grandfather were executives in the Etsuzankai, the influential koenkai of Prime Minister Kakuei Tanaka. She was named after Tanaka's daughter Makiko Tanaka. Her father also served in the Niigata Prefectural Assembly for the Liberal Democratic Party.

Kikuta graduated from a high school in Kamo and studied at Heilongjiang University in China. After having served in the Kamo municipal council for two terms from 1995, she ran unsuccessfully for the Niigata-4th seat in the House of Representatives in 2000 as a member of Ichirō Ozawa's Liberal Party, which merged into the DPJ in 2003. She ran again in 2003 and was elected for the first time.

Kikuta was part of the CDP's shadow cabinet 'Next Cabinet' as the shadow Minister of Education, Culture, Sports, Science and Technology.
