= National Center Test for University Admissions =

Japanese standardized test

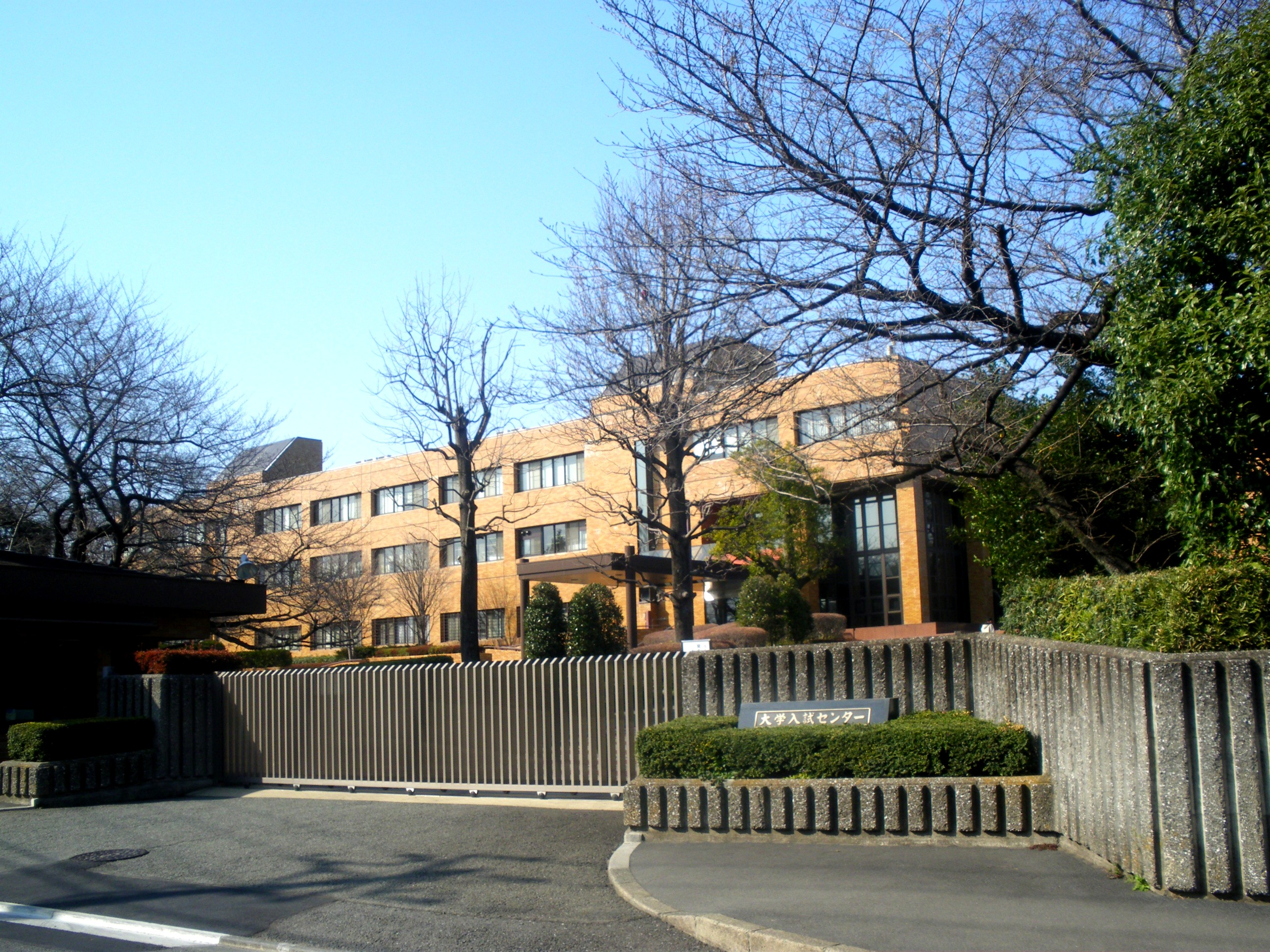
National Center for University Entrance Examinations in 2009

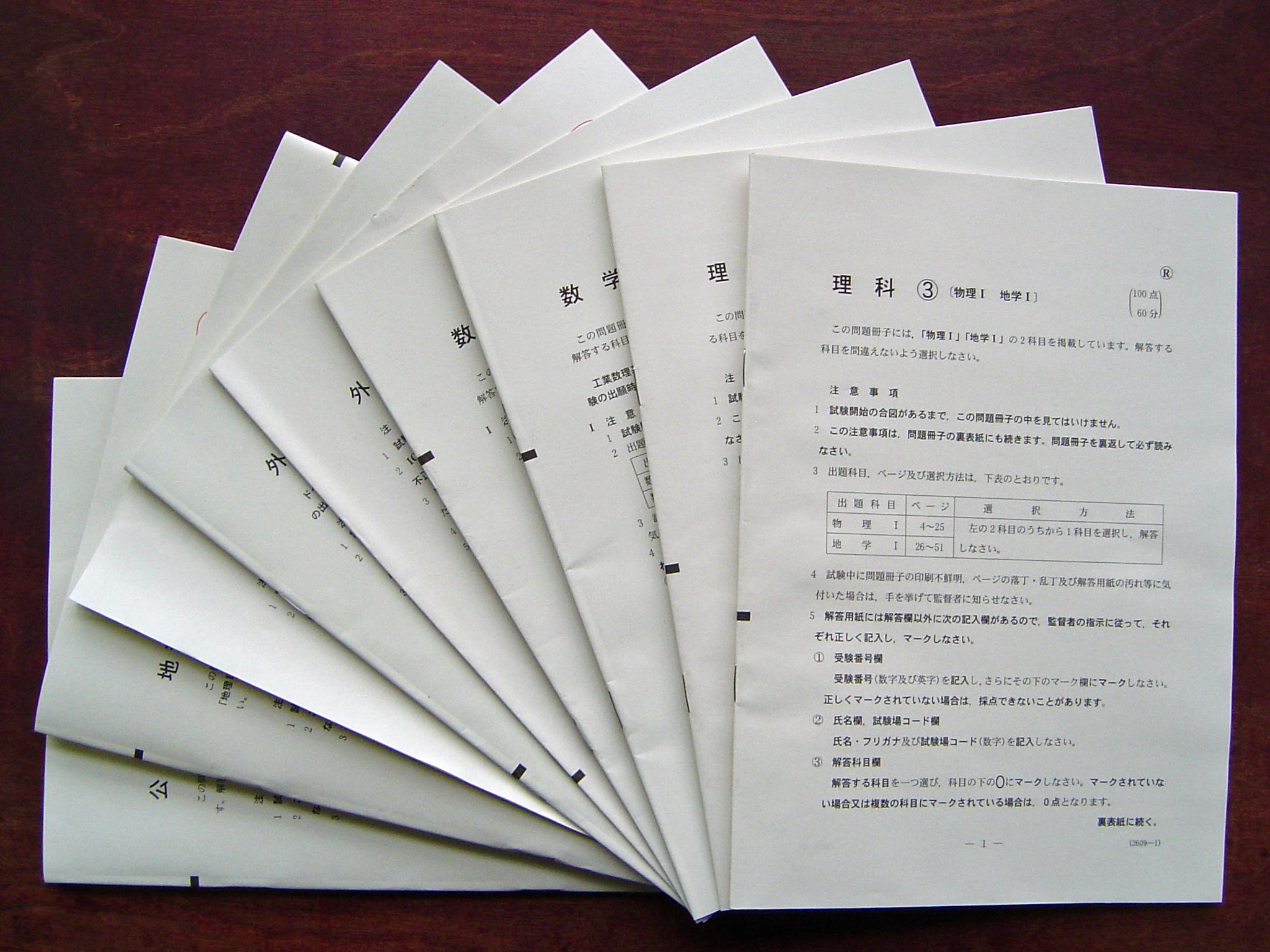
Exam booklets distributed to examinees

The National Center Test for University Admissions (大学入試センター試験, Daigaku Nyūshi Sentā Shiken) was a type of standardized test used by public and some private universities in Japan. It was held annually during a weekend in mid-January over a period of two days. Since the test was held in the middle of winter, snow delayed the exam in some regions, but typically the test started and ended near the same exact time throughout the entire nation.

The Center Test became something of a national phenomenon in Japan, with television coverage and newspapers publishing test questions. To many test-takers in Japan, the test was the difference between college entrance and one year's study for the next year's exams as a rōnin. Since the test was only administered annually and entrance to top-ranked universities and colleges is so competitive in Japan, the test had become the subject of scrutiny by many. In addition, rules for tardiness and absences were extremely strict and always resulted in the forfeit of the right to take the exams, as there were no "makeup" sessions or re-takes offered except in certain cases such as train delays.

The test was administered by National Center for University Entrance Examinations, an Independent Administrative Institution (IAI). The National Center Test superseded the Common First-Stage Examination (共通一次, kyōtsū ichiji), which was administered from 1979 to 1989, letting private universities use the test scores as a criterion for admissions decisions.

In 2012, the test was held on 14 and 15 January, with around 555,500 students participating (down by 3,400 students from 2011). The test was held at 709 locations across the country and will be used by 835 public universities, private universities and junior colleges to grade applicants.

In 2014, on 18 and 19 January, 560,672 students participated at 693 centers.

"As in previous years, there were a few glitches. Heavy snow made some students late in the Hokuriku region, while a disruption to the JR Tokaido shinkansen caused some students to miss the tests in Shizuoka, TBS reported. Trouble was also reported with audio-visual devices for English exam takers in some centers."

The final Center Test was conducted in 2020 and was replaced by the Common Test for University Admissions in 2021.

== Designation ==
The official name in Japanese is Daigaku Nyugakusha Senbatsu Daigaku Nyushi Center Shiken (大学入学者選抜大学入試センター試験, Daigaku Nyūgakusha Senbatsu Daigaku Nyūshi Sentā Shiken; literally "University Candidate Selection University Admissions Center Test"), but this designation is rarely used. It is often called Center Shiken (センター試験, Sentā Shiken), or simply Center (センター, Sentā) by test-takers and teachers.

== Function ==
Some universities decided on successful candidates using only the National Center Test, but most prestigious universities required the candidate to take another, institution-specific exam, which was often more difficult than the National Center Test.

The function of the Center Test depended on the institution, but most could be categorized into the following three types:

- Center Test only: Universities that require only the Center Test results and use only them for admissions decisions. Mostly used by private universities alongside normal (using institution-specific exams) admission.
- Center Test and secondary exam: Universities using the Center Test and a secondary exam (their own test, or an essay or interview) for their decisions. Used by most national universities.
- Center Test as primary decision: Universities using the Center Test as a primary decision, after which the successful candidates are placed on an even plane and are given a secondary, institution-specific exam that decides admission. Used by the most prestigious universities such as the University of Tokyo and Kyoto University, but not seen much elsewhere.

=== Checking scores ===
Because candidates did not know their Center Test scores before applying to universities, most wrote their answers on the question sheets (which can be taken home) and checked their answers using rubrics published by cram schools.

A number of cram schools and other companies have services to which candidates can send their scores and learn their overall position relative to other users of the service, called Center Research (センターリサーチ, Sentā Risāchi). Candidates can use this information to see how they fared as compared with other test-takers and make their final application decisions. (In Japan, candidates may be unable to apply to all their desired universities, as in countries such as the United States, mainly because the secondary exams are scheduled on or near the same day.)

== Tests ==
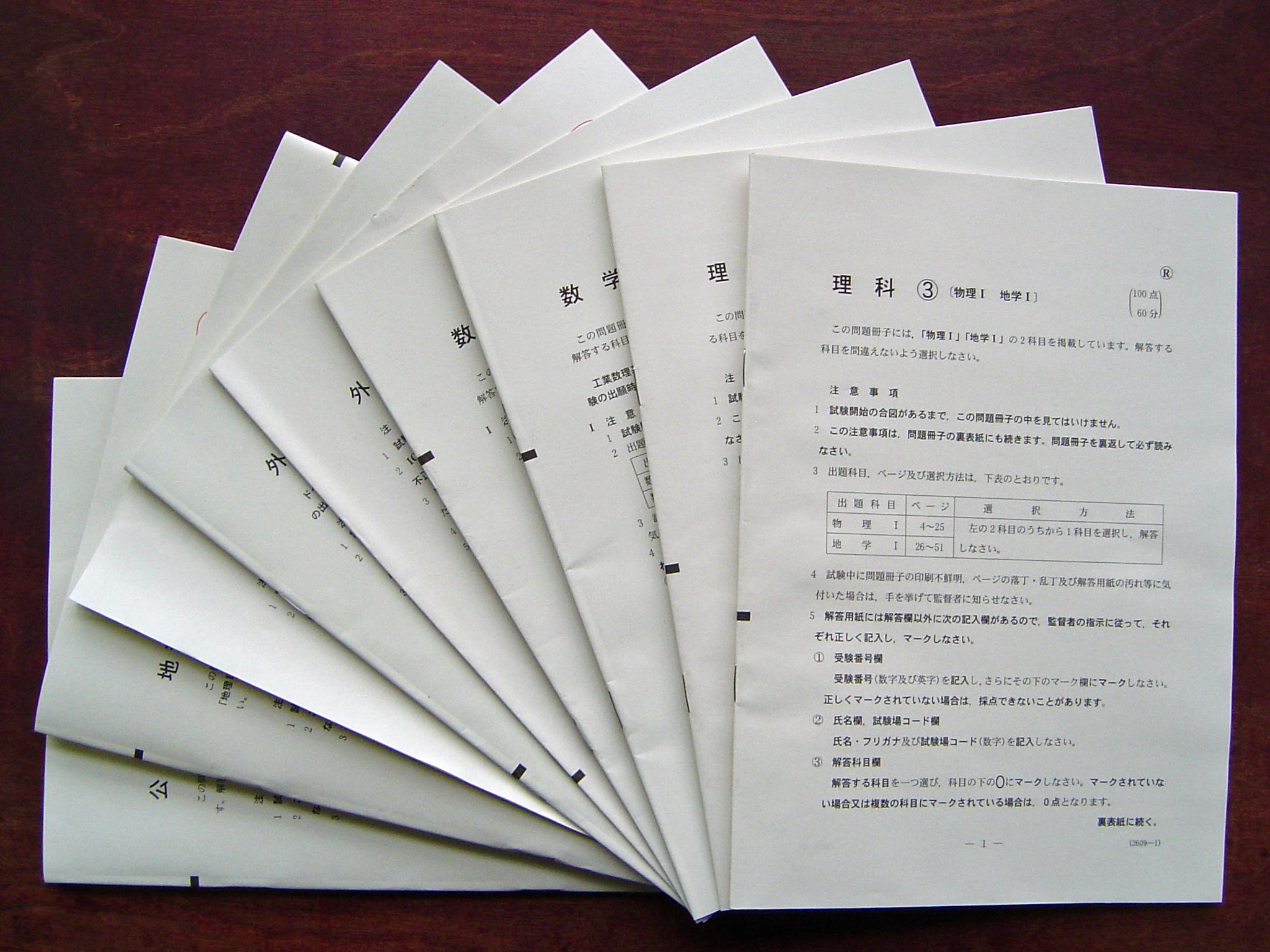
Booklets of questions given to test takers (2007).

There are separate tests for each subject, and each is multiple choice. The tests follow the curriculum guidelines published by the Ministry of Education, Culture, Sports, Science and Technology.

There are a total of 30 tests in six subjects. Candidates take the subjects specified by their university. As an exception, however, candidates for the English (written) exam must take the English (listening).

=== First day ===
In 2020, the first day of exams was held on Saturday, January 18.

- Geography, History and Civics: Candidates select 2 or 1 tests, not including the same name. 100 points each, 60 minutes each
  - World History A (世界史A)
  - World History B (世界史B)
  - Japanese History A (日本史A)
  - Japanese History B (日本史B)
  - Geography A (地理A)
  - Geography B (地理B)
  - Contemporary Social Studies (現代社会)
  - Ethics (倫理)
  - Politics and Economics (政治・経済)
  - Ethics, Politics and Economics (倫理、政治・経済)
- Japanese Literature: 200 points (Passages written in and after modern period 100 points, Classical Japanese 50 points, Kanbun 50 points), 80 minutes
  - Japanese Literature (国語)
- Foreign Languages (written): 200 points each, 80 minutes
  - English (英語)
  - German (ドイツ語)
  - French (フランス語)
  - Chinese (中国語)
  - Korean (韓国語)
- Foreign Languages (listening): 50 points, 60 minutes (Explanation of process and equipment 30 minutes, testing time 30 minutes). This test is available only for English.

=== Second day ===
In 2020, the second day of exams was held on Sunday, January 19.

In the Science(1)and(2), candidates have to select and register from the following four types: A: 2 tests of Science(1). B: 1 test of Science(2). C: 2 tests of Science(1) + 1 test of Science(2). D: 2 tests of Science(2). Most humanities science departments require to take type A, and natural science departments require to take type D.

- Science (1): Candidates select 2 tests. 100 points total (50 points each), 60 minutes total
  - Physics Basis (物理基礎)
  - Chemistry Basis (化学基礎)
  - Biology Basis (生物基礎)
  - Earth Science Basis (地学基礎)
- Mathematics (1): 100 points each, 60 minutes
  - Mathematics I (数学I)
  - Mathematics I and Mathematics A (数学IA)
    - Candidates may select and answer two questions from Mathematics A: combinatorics and probability theory, nature of integer, nature of shape.
- Mathematics (2): 100 points each, 60 minutes
  - Mathematics II (数学II)
  - Mathematics II and Mathematics B (数学IIB)
    - Candidates may select and answer two questions from Mathematics B: sequences, vectors, probability distribution.
  - Bookkeeping and Accounting (簿記・会計)
  - Informatics Basis (情報関係基礎)
- Science (2): Candidates select 2 or 1 tests. 100 points each, 60 minutes each
  - Physics (物理)
  - Chemistry (化学)
  - Biology (生物)
  - Earth Science (地学)

== Listening exam and IC player ==
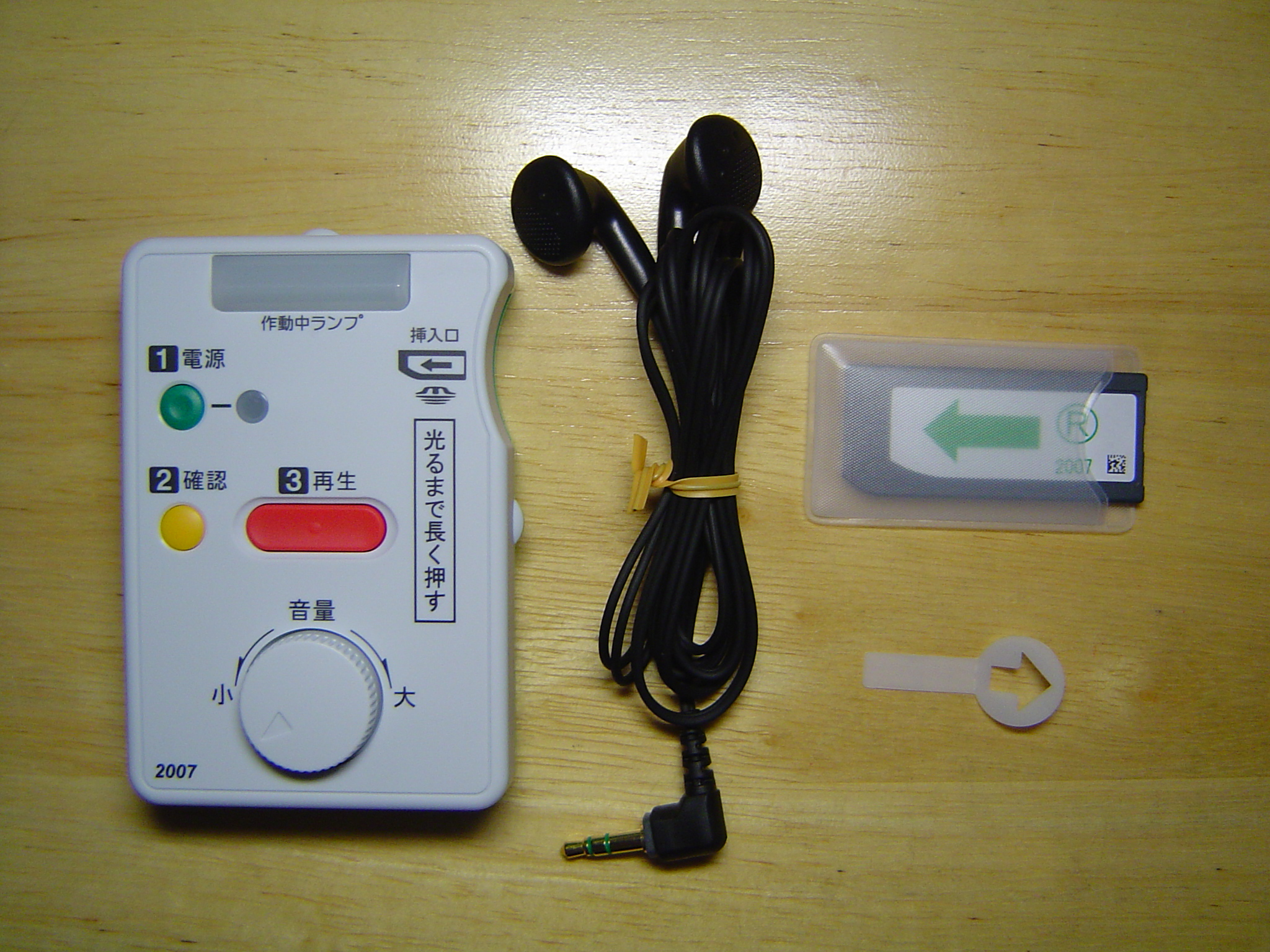
IC player used in 2007

A listening exam was introduced in 2006 for candidates of the English (written) exam. An IC player was handed out to all candidates of the exam, and a whole 30 minutes of testing time was devoted to the explanation of usage of this device.

There was some controversy surrounding the introduction of this exam, and critics doubted the reliability of this device. In 2006, there were 497 (about 0.09%) cases in which candidates had to be given re-tests because of device failure.

Since the IC players could be taken home, candidates around Japan disassembled the devices at home, finding that the players used Sony's Memory Stick for storage of the exam. Although no note of the manufacturer was made in either the media or on the device itself, the use of this storage format led most to believe that Sony was the manufacturer.

The memory stick from a sample device provided to an examination supervisor prior to the 2007 examinations, containing a full sample audio test, contained four files with the .bin file extension. A cursory attempt to extract the content of these files failed and changing the file extension to common audio formats, such as .wav, .mp3, and .wma also did not result in playable files. The total size of all four files was 4.63MB, and the total listening time of 30 minutes makes it obvious that the audio tracks are highly compressed.

Additionally, the non-intuitive sequence of buttons needed to operate the player raises concern over the possibility of candidates having difficulty operating the player under test conditions. The inability to stop and restart the audio tracks seems probably due to a wish to ensure that all candidates complete all the listening within the test period. Of even more concern is that the memory stick on the sample player was exposed and could be removed by candidates, leaving open the possibility that candidates may inadvertently remove the memory stick during the test and render the player inoperable.
