= Eiichiro Washio =

Japanese politician

- 鷲尾 英一郎
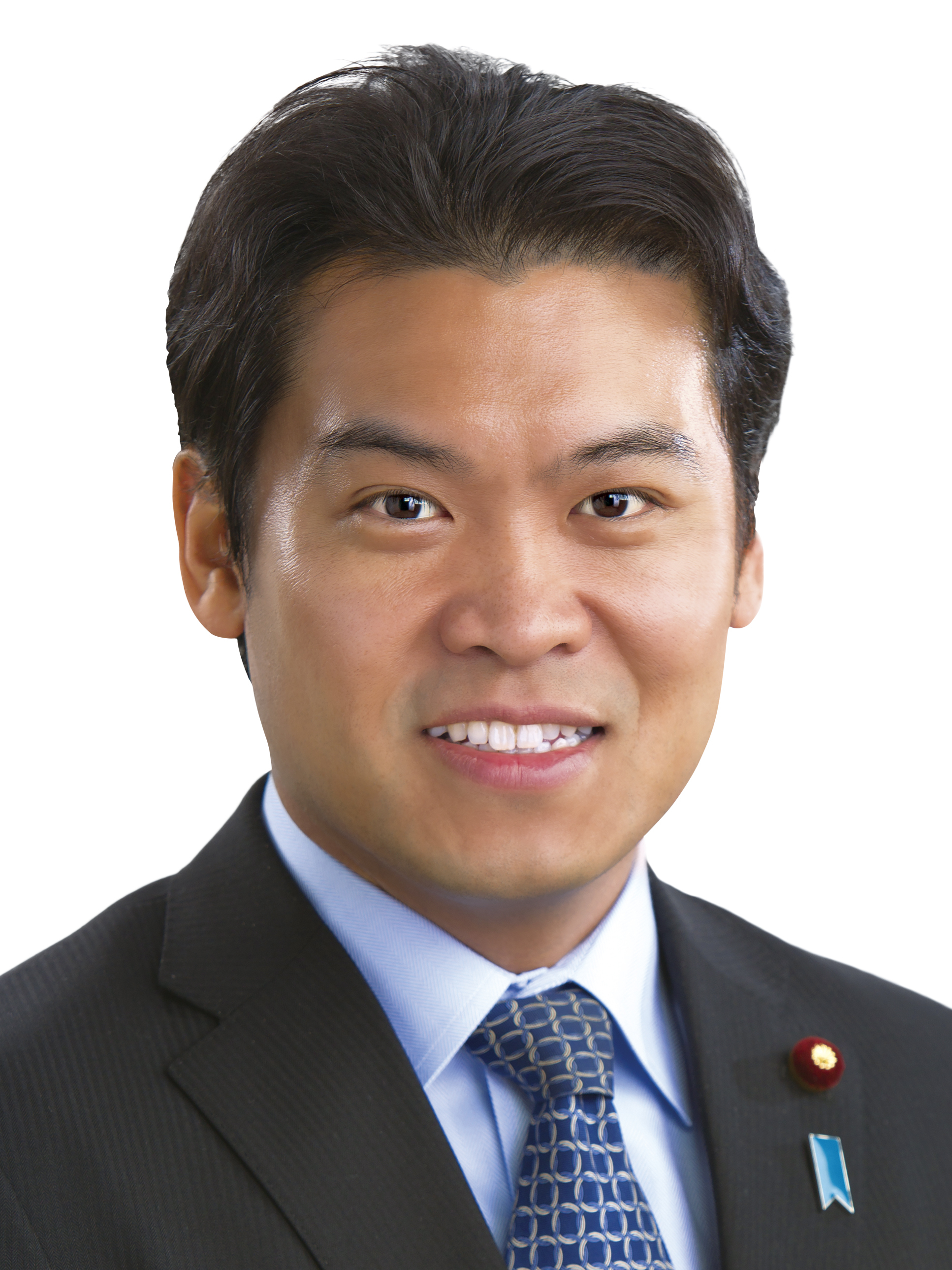
- Official portrait, 2009

Member of the House of Representatives; from Hokuriku-Shin'etsu
- Incumbent
- Assumed office 9 February 2026
- Preceded by: Ryuichi Yoneyama
- Constituency: Niigata 4th
- In office 12 September 2005 – 9 October 2024
- Constituency: See list: PR block (2005–2009); Niigata 2nd (2009–2012); PR block (2012–2017); Niigata 2nd (2017–2021); PR block (2021–2024)

Personal details
- Born: 3 January 1977 (age 49) Niigata, Japan
- Party: Liberal Democratic
- Other political affiliations: DPJ (2005–2016); DP (2016–2017); Independent (2017–2019)
- Education: University of Tokyo

Eiichiro Washio (鷲尾 英一郎, Washio Eiichirō; born 3 January 1977) is a Japanese politician who serves as a member of the House of Representatives in the Diet (national legislature). A native of Niigata, Niigata and graduate of the University of Tokyo, he worked at Ernst & Young ShinNihon from 2001 to 2005. He was elected to the House of Representatives for the first time in 2005.

== Right-wing positions ==
He was a supporter of right-wing filmmaker Satoru Mizushima's 2007 revisionist film The Truth about Nanjing, which denied that the Nanjing Massacre ever occurred.
