= Shuichi Takatori =

Japanese politician

- 高鳥 修一
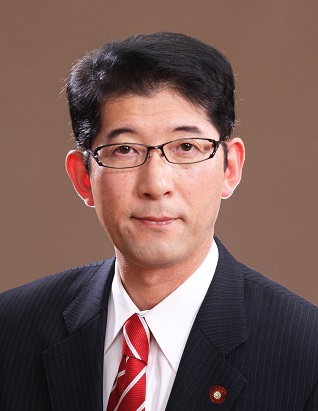
- Official portrait, 2011

Member of the House of Representatives; from Hokuriku-Shin'etsu
- Incumbent
- Assumed office 8 February 2026
- Preceded by: Mamoru Umetani
- Constituency: Niigata 5th
- In office 16 December 2012 – 9 October 2024
- Preceded by: Nobutaka Tsutsui
- Succeeded by: Multi-member district
- Constituency: Niigata 6th (2012–2021); PR block (2021–2024)
- In office 11 September 2005 – 21 July 2009
- Constituency: PR block

Personal details
- Born: 29 September 1960 (age 66) Jōetsu, Niigata, Japan
- Party: Liberal Democratic
- Education: Waseda University

Shuichi Takatori (高鳥 修一, Takatori Shūichi; born 29 September 1960) is a Japanese politician and a member of the House of Representatives in the Diet for the Liberal Democratic Party. A native of Joetsu, Niigata he was elected for the first time in 2005.
