= Tadayoshi Nagashima =

Japanese politician (1951–2017)

- 長島 忠美
- Official portrait, 2014

Member of the House of Representatives; from Hokuriku-Shin'etsu
- In office 11 September 2005 – 18 August 2017
- Preceded by: Multi-member district
- Succeeded by: Hirohiko Izumida
- Constituency: PR block (2005–2012); Niigata 5th (2012–2017)

Mayor of Yamakoshi
- In office 31 March 2000 – 31 March 2005
- Preceded by: Shogo Sakai
- Succeeded by: Office abolished

Personal details
- Born: 9 January 1951 Yamakoshi, Niigata, Japan
- Died: 18 August 2017 (aged 66) Nagaoka, Niigata, Japan
- Party: Liberal Democratic
- Education: Toyo University

Tadayoshi Nagashima (長島 忠美, Nagashima Tadayoshi; 9 January 1951 – 18 August 2017) was a Japanese politician who served in the House of Representatives in the Diet (national legislature) as a member of the Liberal Democratic Party.

== Career ==
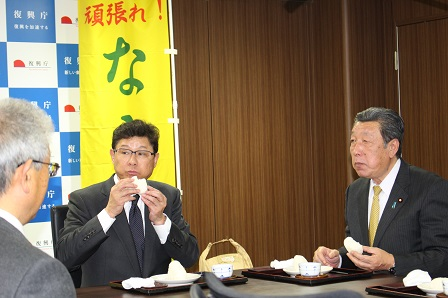
Nagashima (right) along with Tsuyoshi Takagi (center-left) in 2015

Born in the village of Yamakoshi, Niigata (now part of the city of Nagaoka), Nagashima graduated the Toyo University.

He served as mayor of his hometown Yamakoshi between 2000 and 2005, the year the village, severely damaged by an earthquake in 2004, merged with the city of Nagaoka.

Nagashima was elected to the Diet for the first time in 2005.

According to the LDP website, he held the following positions:

- Headman, Yamakoshi Village
- Member, Diet Affairs Committee of LDP
- Deputy Director Secretary, Special Committee on Disasters of LDP
- Minister of State for Disaster Management of LDP's Shadow Cabinet
- Vice-Chairman, Committee on Judicial Affairs and Local Autonomous Organizations of LDP
- Parliamentary Secretary of Agriculture, Forestry and Fisheries
- Parliamentary Secretary for Reconstruction

== Positions ==
Nagashima was affiliated to the openly revisionist lobby Nippon Kaigi, and a member of the following right-wing groups in the Diet:

- Nippon Kaigi Diet discussion group (日本会議国会議員懇談会 - Nippon kaigi kokkai giin kondankai)
- Diet Celebration League of the 20th Anniversary of His Majesty The Emperor's Accession to the Throne (天皇陛下御即位二十年奉祝国会議員連盟)
- Conference of parliamentarians on the Shinto Association of Spiritual Leadership (神道政治連盟国会議員懇談会 - Shinto Seiji Renmei Kokkai Giin Kondankai) - NB: SAS a.k.a. Sinseiren, Shinto Political League

Nagashima gave the following answers to the questionnaire submitted by Mainichi to parliamentarians in 2014:

- no answer regarding the revision of the Article 9 of the Japanese Constitution
- no answer regarding the right of collective self-defense
- no answer regarding nuclear plants
- against visits of a Prime Minister to the controversial Yasukuni Shrine
- in favor of the revision of the Murayama Statement
- no answer regarding the revision of the Kono Statement
- no answer regarding laws preventing hate speech
- no answer regarding question whether Marine Corps Air Station Futenma is a burden for Okinawa
- no answer regarding the Special Secrecy Law
- no answer regarding teaching 'morality' in school
