= National Center for University Entrance Examinations =

The National Center for University Entrance Examinations (独立行政法人大学入試センター, dokuritsu gyōsei hōjin Daigaku Nyushi Center; DNC) is an Independent Administrative Institution that administers the National Center Test for University Admissions and law school entrance exams in Japan.

The institution is under the control of the Ministry of Education, Culture, Sports, Science and Technology. Its offices are located in Komaba, Meguro, Tokyo.

== History ==
- 1977 Established as the preparation organization for the Common First-Stage Examination
- 1979 First Common First-Stage Examination
- 1988 Started providing information on universities through the videotex with its Heart System (ハートシステム)
- 1990 Became the administrator of the National Center Test for University Admissions
- 2003 Began administering law school entrance exams

== See also ==
- Independent Administrative Institution (IAI), 2001
- List of Independent Administrative Institutions (Japan)
