= Hideo Watanabe =

Japanese politician (1934–2024)

- 渡辺 秀央

President of the New Renaissance Party
- In office 29 August 2008 – 22 April 2010
- Preceded by: Position established
- Succeeded by: Yōichi Masuzoe

Minister of Posts and Telecommunications
- In office 5 November 1991 – 12 December 1992
- Prime Minister: Kiichi Miyazawa
- Preceded by: Katsutsugu Sekiya
- Succeeded by: Junichiro Koizumi

Deputy Chief Cabinet Secretary (Political affairs)
- In office 22 July 1986 – 6 November 1987
- Prime Minister: Yasuhiro Nakasone
- Preceded by: Shunjirō Karasawa
- Succeeded by: Ichirō Ozawa

Member of the House of Councillors
- In office 26 July 1998 – 25 July 2010
- Constituency: National PR

Member of the House of Representatives
- In office 10 December 1976 – 18 June 1993
- Preceded by: Ichirō Ōno
- Succeeded by: Makiko Tanaka
- Constituency: Niigata 3rd

Personal details
- Born: 5 July 1934 Tochio, Niigata, Japan
- Died: 31 July 2024 (aged 90) Chiba Prefecture, Japan
- Party: New Renaissance
- Other political affiliations: LDP (1976–1993); Independent (1993–1994); NFP (1994–1998); LP (1998–2003); DPJ (2003–2008)
- Education: Takushoku University

Hideo Watanabe (渡辺 秀央, Watanabe Hideo; 5 July 1934 – 31 July 2024) was a Japanese politician of the Democratic Party of Japan who was a member of the House of Representatives and House of Councillors in the Diet (national legislature) from 1976 to 1993 and 1998 to 2010 respectively.

== Life and career ==
A native of Tochio, Niigata and graduate of Takushoku University, he was elected to the House of Representatives in the 1976 general election as part of the ruling Liberal Democratic Party, and re-elected five times before losing his seat in the pivotal 1993 general election.

He joined the New Frontier Party in 1997 and then won a seat on the Liberal Party proportional representation slate for the House of Councillors in the 1998 election. He led electoral cooperation talks between the LP and LDP which broke down in March 2000 concurrently with failed merger talks between party presidents Keizo Obuchi and Ichiro Ozawa. The LP subsequently merged with the Democratic Party of Japan and Watanabe retained his House of Councillors seat on the DPJ slate in the 2004 election.

He left the DPJ in 2008 to start the Reform Club, which became the New Renaissance Party in April 2010 under the leadership of Yoichi Masuzoe. Watanabe retired from politics upon refusing to run in the 2010 House of Councillors election.

Watanabe was the chairman of Japan-Myanmar Friendship Association. Watanabe first provided aid to Myanmar in 1987 and then began interacting with the military. He had close ties with the military's proxy Union Solidarity and Development Party since the time of ex-general Thein Sein's quasi-civilian government. It is said that he had been close to Senior General Min Aung Hlaing for over a decade, and they met shortly before and after the February 2021 coup. Following the military coup d'état, he told The Asahi Shimbun newspaper that Min Aung Hlaing had not staged a coup but "done what he should have in accordance with the law". In November 2022, he was awarded the title of Thiri Pyanchi, one of the country's highest honors.

Watanabe died on 31 July 2024, at the age of 90.

== Sources ==
- 政治家情報 〜渡辺 秀央〜. senkyo.janjan.jp (in Japanese). JANJAN. Archived from the original on 8 December 2007.
