= Yuzuki Muroi =

Japanese novelist, essayist, and tarento (born 1970)

- 室井 佑月
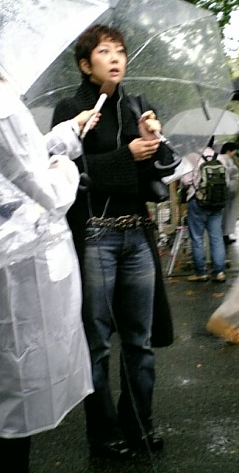
- Born: February 27, 1970 (age 56); Aomori Prefecture, Japan
- Education: Tochigi Prefecture Tateishi Bridge High School
- Occupations: Novelist, essayist, tarento
- Years active: 1997–
- Agent: O.K.Production
- Height: 1.62 m (5 ft 4 in)
- Spouse(s): Genichiro Takahashi (m. 1999–2001) Ryuichi Yoneyama (m. 2020)
- Website: Official website

Yuzuki Muroi (室井 佑月, Muroi Yuzuki; born February 27, 1970, in Aomori Prefecture, Japan) is a Japanese novelist, essayist, and tarento represented by O.K. Production.

== Filmography ==
=== TV and radio series ===
| Title | Network | Notes |
|---|---|---|
| Barairo Dandy | Tokyo MX | Wednesday appearances |
| Hiruobi! | TBS | Thursday appearances |
| Masahiro Nakai no Kin'yōbi no Sma-tachi e | TBS | Regular appearances |
| Makoto Otake Golden Radio | NCB | Friday appearances |
| Asaichi | NHK | Occasional guest |
| Kyō Doki! | HBC | |

=== Former appearances ===
| Year | Title | Network | Notes |
|---|---|---|---|
| | Nippon Dandy | Tokyo MX | Wednesday appearances |
| | Biz Spo Wide | NHK | Occasional guest |
| | Tokudane! | Fuji TV | Tuesday appearances |
| | FNN Super News Anchor | KTV | Wednesday appearances |
| | Ping Pong | TBS | Thursday appearances |
| | The Sunday | NTV | Weekly appearances |
| | Super Morning | TV Asahi | Tuesday appearances |
| 2011 | Nep League Geinō-kai Jōshiki-ō Kettei-sen | Fuji TV | |
| 2011 | Bakushō! Dai Nihon Akan Keisatsu | Fuji TV | Guest Judge |
| 2011 | | NTV | |

=== Films ===
| Year | Title | Notes |
|---|---|---|
| 1997 | Kankintōbō Midarana Noroi | Lead role |
| 1999 | Tobu wa Tengoku, Moguru ga Jigoku | Lead role |
| 2005 | On the Rock | |
| 2005 | Female | |

== Bibliography ==
| Year | Title | Notes |
|---|---|---|
| 1998 | Akai Hana | |
| 1998 | Nettai Shokubutsu-en | |
| 1999 | Piss | |
| 2000 | Love Go Go | |
| 2000 | Sakka no Hanamichi | |
| 2001 | An-Anan | |
| 2001 | Ko-tsukuri Bakuretsu-den Unde Yarou Janai no Sodatete Yarou Janai no | |
| 2001 | Dragonfly | |
| 2002 | Merry Go Round | |
| 2002 | Petit Bijin no Higeki | Co-author |
| 2003 | Kuruma wa Otoko no Ecstasy | |
| 2003 | Love Fire | |
| 2004 | Koi no Q&A | |
| 2004 | Petit Bijin to Okane | Co-author |
| 2005 | Koi Yori Shigoto | |
| 2005 | Puchisuto | |
| 2006 | Mama no Kami-sama | |
| 2006 | Puchisuto Hyper! | |
| 2006 | Love Love Love Yuzuki Muroi to Blog no Nakama-tachi | |
| 2007 | Acryl Shouin | |
