= Common First-Stage Examination =

Standardized test in Japan

The Common First-Stage Examination (共通第１次学力試験, Kyōtsū daiichiji gakuryoku shiken) was a standardized test administered in Japan and used for university admissions from 1979 to 1989.

The subjects tested basic skills and covered the following subjects: Japanese literature, mathematics, English, social studies, and science. The exam was administered by the National Center for University Entrance Examinations, an Independent Administrative Institution. The test was superseded by the National Center Test for University Admissions.

== Origins ==
The idea of a standardized test was discussed in the 1960s by the Ministry of Education. In the 1970s, the exam became a reality following approval by the government and ruling party. It was intended to reduce the exam stress encountered by high school seniors battling for a place in their choice of college.

A decision was made in 1988 to change the name of the exam, and this was implemented in 1990.
