= Kichinosuke Meguro =

- 目黒 吉之助

Member of the House of Representatives
- In office 1990–1993
- Constituency: Old Niigata 3rd district

Member of the Niigata Prefectural Assembly
- Incumbent
- Assumed office 1979

Personal details
- Born: March 29, 1934 Minamiaizu District, Fukushima Prefecture, Japan
- Died: March 14, 2019 (aged 84) Shibukawa, Gunma Prefecture, Japan
- Party: Japan Socialist Party; Social Democratic Party
- Relations: Father-in-law: Toraji Kobayashi (Niigata Prefectural Assembly member)
- Education: Hosei University (Graduate School of Political Science)
- Occupation: Politician
- Awards: Order of the Rising Sun, Gold Rays with Rosette; Junior Sixth Rank

Kichinosuke Meguro (目黒 吉之助, Meguro Kichinosuke; 29 March 1934 – 14 March 2019) was a Japanese politician. He served as a member of the Niigata Prefectural Assembly for four terms and as a member of the House of Representatives for one term.

== Biography ==
Meguro was born in Tadami, Fukushima Prefecture. He completed graduate studies in political science at Hosei University in 1961. He served as secretary-general of the Niigata Prefectural Federation of the Japan Farmers' Union (Nichinō) and as chairman of the Nagaoka Labor-Farmer Conference, among other positions, before being elected to the Niigata Prefectural Assembly in 1979, where he served four terms.

In the 1990 general election he was elected for the first time from the old multi-member Niigata 3rd district. He lost his seat in the 1993 general election. He later stood unsuccessfully in the 1995 House of Councillors election for the Niigata at-large district and in the 2000 general election for Niigata 5th district.

In 2005 he was awarded the Order of the Rising Sun, Gold Rays with Rosette.

Meguro died of multiple organ failure on 14 March 2019 at a hospital in Shibukawa, Gunma Prefecture, aged 84. He was posthumously awarded the court rank of Junior Sixth Rank.

== Bibliography ==
- Shintei Gendai Seijika Jinmei Jiten: Chūō · Chihō no Seijika 4000-nin (新訂 現代政治家人名事典 : 中央・地方の政治家4000人). Nichigai Associates, 2005.
