= Niigata 5th district =

Legislative district of Japan

Niigata 5th District
- National Diet constituency for the Japanese House of Representatives
- Numbered map of Niigata Prefecture single-member districts
- Prefecture: Niigata
- Proportional District: Hokuriku-Shinetsu Block
- Electorate: 334,805 (2026)

Current constituency
- Created: 1994
- Seats: One
- Party: LDP
- Representative: Shuichi Takatori
- Created from: Niigata 3rd SNTV "medium-sized" district

Niigata 5th district (新潟[県第]5区 Niigata[-ken dai-]go-ku) is a single-member electoral district for the House of Representatives, the lower house of the National Diet of Japan. It is located in southern Niigata Prefecture including the region known as Jōetsu. As of September 2012, 282,904 voters were registered in Niigata 5th district, giving its voters above average vote weight.

Before the electoral reform, the area had formed part of the five-member Niigata 3rd district of former Liberal Democratic Party (LDP) president-prime minister, faction leader and "shadow shogun" Kakuei Tanaka and his daughter Makiko Tanaka who became science and technology minister in the Murayama Cabinet in 1994. The second ranking representative from the 3rd district in the last pre-reform election of 1993 had been former Takeshita faction Liberal Democrat Yukio Hoshino who joined the defecting Japan Renewal Party in the 1993 no-confidence vote against LDP president-prime minister Kiichi Miyazawa. After the reform, Hoshino contested the new single-member 5th district against Tanaka for the New Frontier Party, but lost to Tanaka. Tanaka became foreign minister in the Koizumi Cabinet, but was dismissed in 2002; in the same year, a scandal over (state-funded) salaries for Representative's secretaries who had allegedly been employed (and already paid) by Echigo Kōtsū ("Echigo Transportation", a Tanaka family company) led eventually to her resignation. Hoshino won the resulting by-election as an independent and joined the LDP afterwards. But in the 2003 general election, Tanaka took the 5th district back by a clear margin. She joined the Democratic Party (DPJ) parliamentary group in 2003 and the Democratic Party before the 2009 House of Representatives election. Tanaka was appointed a minister for the third time in the DPJ-led Noda Cabinet in 2012.

In the 2012 House of Representatives election, Tanaka lost the district to LDP candidate Tadayoshi Nagashima. This was 65 years after her father was first elected to represent Niigata in the lower house. Only her husband Naoki (maiden name: Suzuki) continued the Tanaka tradition in the Diet as member of the House of Councillors from Niigata until 2016.

In 2017, Nagashima died in office. The next representative was former governor of Niigata Prefecture Hirohiko Izumida. In 2021, Izumida was challenged by two independent candidates, Tamio Mori, former mayor of Nagaoka, and another former Niigata Governor Ryuichi Yoneyama. Yoneyama, who was endorsed by the CDP and other opposition parties, won the seat. After the elections, Izumida, who managed to get a seat in the PR block, claimed he was asked to pay kickback money if he wanted to win.

== Area ==
After redistricting in 2022, the boundaries changed significantly. The district includes all of the abolished Niigata 6th district.

- Itoigawa
- Jōetsu
- Minami-Uonuma
- Myōkō
- Tōkamachi
- Uonuma
- Tsunan Town
- Yuzawa Town

== List of representatives ==
Representative	Party	Dates	Notes
Makiko Tanaka	LDP	1996 – 2002	LDP membership suspended in June 2002, resigned in August 2002
Vacant (August–October 2002)
Yukio Hoshino	Indep.	2002 – 2003	Re-joined the LDP in 2002
Makiko Tanaka	Indep.	2003 – 2009	Joined the DPJ parliamentary group in 2003, the DPJ in 2009
Makiko Tanaka	DPJ	2009 – 2012	Not re-elected in the Hokuriku-Shin'etsu block
Tadayoshi Nagashima	LDP	2012 – 2017	Died August 18, 2017
Hirohiko Izumida	LDP	2017 – 2021	
Ryuichi Yoneyama	Indep.	2021 – 2024	Moved to the 4th district
Mamoru Umetani	CDP	2024 – 2026	Moved from the 6th district
Shuichi Takatori	LDP	2026 –	

== Election results ==
2026
Party	Candidate	Votes	%	±%
LDP	Shūichi Takatori	104,206	52.1	▲7.4
Centrist Reform	Mamoru Umetani	79,294	39.6	▼15.7
Sanseitō	Naoyuki Takano	16,494	8.2	
Turnout			60.77	▼1.8
LDP gain from Centrist Reform				

2024
Party	Candidate	Votes	%	±%
CDP	Mamoru Umetani	114,429	55.27	New
LDP	Shuichi Takatori (endorsed by Komeito)	92,589	44.73	▲10.30
Turnout		207,018	62.62	▼2.58

2021
Party	Candidate	Votes	%	±%
Independent	Ryuichi Yoneyama	79,447	44.96	
LDP – Kōmeitō	Hirohiko Izumida	60,837	34.43	
Independent	Tamio Mori	36,422	20.6	

2017
Party	Candidate	Votes	%	±%
LDP – Kōmeitō	Hirohiko Izumida	91,855	51.8	
Independent	Etsuko Ohirairi	79,655	44.7	
HRP	Reiko Kasahara	5,735	3.2	

2014
Party	Candidate	Votes	%	±%
LDP – Kōmeitō	Tadayoshi Nagashima	81,176	57.3	+11.6
PLP	Yūko Mori	47,420	33.5	new
JCP	Kōichi Hattori	12,993	9.2	+4.5

2012
Party	Candidate	Votes	%	±%
LDP – Kōmeitō	Tadayoshi Nagashima	80,488	45.7	new
DPJ – PNP	Makiko Tanaka	51,503	29.3	−19.8
JRP – YP	Ryūichi Yoneyama	35,720	20.3	−20.8
JCP	Kōichi Hattori	8,296	4.7	new

2009
Party	Candidate	Votes	%	±%
DPJ	Makiko Tanaka	103,202	49.1	
LDP – Kōmeitō, JRP	Ryūichi Yoneyama	86,453	41.1	
SDP	Shōichi Ibe	17,698	8.4	
Independent	Yoshitaka Yamada	1,458	0.7	
HRP	Ken'ya Kasamaki	1,323	0.6	
Turnout		215,195	42.52	

2005
Party	Candidate	Votes	%	±%
Independent	Makiko Tanaka	105,484	51.2	
LDP	Ryūichi Yoneyama	82,993	40.3	
JCP	Minoru Saitō	17,693	8.6	
Turnout		211,532	73.72	

2003
Party	Candidate	Votes	%	±%
Independent	Makiko Tanaka	98,112	49.1	
LDP	Yukio Hoshino	61,937	31.0	
Independent	Katsuhiko Shirakawa	30,086	15.1	
JCP	Minoru Saitō	9,506	4.8	
Turnout		203,623	70.93	

October 27, 2002 by-election
Party	Candidate	Votes	%	±%
Independent	Yukio Hoshino	69,146	47.9	
Independent	Katsu Ishizumi	60,045	41.6	
JCP	Kayoko Kuwahara	15,298	10.6	
Turnout		148,650	51.86	

2000
Party	Candidate	Votes	%	±%
LDP	Makiko Tanaka	137,866	68.6	
SDP	Kichinosuke Meguro	50,208	25.0	
JCP	Eiji Katō	12,827	6.4	

1996
Party	Candidate	Votes	%	±%
LDP	Makiko Tanaka	96,759	48.9	
NFP	Yukio Hoshino	75,524	38.1	
SDP	Masahide Kataoka	15,823	8.0	
JCP	Masayuki Kondō	9,961	5.0	
Turnout		202,899	72.64	
