= Niigata 6th district =

Legislative district of Japan

Niigata 6th District
- Former Parliamentary constituency for the Japanese House of Representatives
- Prefecture: Niigata
- Proportional District: Hokuriku-Shinetsu

Former constituency
- Created: 1994
- Abolished: 2022
- Seats: One
- Replaced by: Niigata 5th (merged into)

Niigata 6th district (新潟県第6区, Niigata-ken dai-rokku or simply 新潟6区, Niigata-rokku) was a single-member constituency of the House of Representatives in the national Diet of Japan located in Niigata Prefecture.

== Areas covered ==
It was abolished by the revision of the Public Offices Election Act 2022, and the entire area has been changed to 5th district.

2013-2022

- Itoigawa
- Jōetsu
- Myōkō
- Tōkamachi
- Nakauonuma District

1994-2013

- Itoigawa
- Jōetsu
- Arai（merged into Myoko）
- Tōkamachi
- Nakauonuma District
- Higashikubiki District
- Nakakubiki District
- Nishikubiki District

== List of representatives ==
Election	Representative	Party	Notes
1996	Osamu Takatori	Liberal Democratic	
2000	Nobutaka Tsutsui	Democratic	
2003	Nobutaka Tsutsui	Democratic	
2005	Nobutaka Tsutsui	Democratic	
2009	Nobutaka Tsutsui	Democratic	
2012	Shuichi Takatori	Liberal Democratic	
2014	Shuichi Takatori	Liberal Democratic	
2017	Shuichi Takatori	Liberal Democratic	
2021	Mamoru Umetani	CDP	

== Election results ==
2021
Party	Candidate	Votes	%	±%
CDP	Mamoru Umetani	90,679	49.57	N/A
Liberal Democratic (endorsed by Komeito)	Shuichi Takatori (incumbent) (won PR seat)	90,549	49.50	
Independent	Kosan Kandori	1,711	0.94	N/A
Registered electors		272,966		
Turnout			67.79	▲1.58
CDP gain from LDP				

2017
Party	Candidate	Votes	%	±%
Liberal Democratic (endorsed by Komeito)	Shuichi Takatori (incumbent)	94,292	50.59	
Independent	Mamoru Umetani	92,080	49.41	N/A
Registered electors		285,999		
Turnout			66.21	▲9.93
LDP hold				

2014
Party	Candidate	Votes	%	±%
Liberal Democratic (endorsed by Komeito)	Shuichi Takatori (incumbent)	83,638	52.70	
Democratic	Mamoru Umetani	62,766	39.55	
Communist	Mikiko Takahashi	12,315	7.76	
Registered electors		288,032		
Turnout			56.28	▼7.13
LDP hold				

2012
Party	Candidate	Votes	%	±%
Liberal Democratic (endorsed by Komeito)	Shuichi Takatori	98,676	55.08	
Democratic (endorsed by PNP)	Nobutaka Tsutsui (incumbent)	66,564	37.15	
Communist	Mikiko Takahashi	13,914	7.77	
Registered electors		292,581		
Turnout			63.41	▼13.37
LDP gain from Democratic				

2009
Party	Candidate	Votes	%	±%
Democratic	Nobutaka Tsutsui (incumbent)	124,894	55.35	
Liberal Democratic	Shuichi Takatori (PR seat incumbent)	89,672	39.74	
Communist	Masayuki Hashimoto	9,222	4.09	
Happiness Realization	Daisei Kokuryo	1,836	0.81	
Registered electors		298,729		
Turnout			76.78	▲1.08
Democratic hold				

2005
Party	Candidate	Votes	%	±%
Democratic	Nobutaka Tsutsui (incumbent)	114,081	50.17	
Liberal Democratic	Shuichi Takatori (won PR seat)	102,187	44.94	
Communist	Shori Takeda	11,138	4.90	
Registered electors		304,495		
Turnout			75.70	▲2.25
Democratic hold				
