= Hirohiko Izumida =

Japanese politician (born 1962)

- 泉田 裕彦
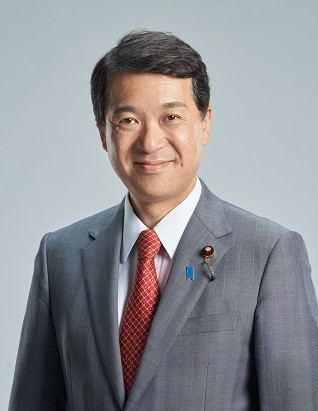
- Official portrait, 2021

Member of the House of Representatives; from Hokuriku-Shin'etsu
- In office 25 October 2017 – 9 October 2024
- Preceded by: Tadayoshi Nagashima
- Succeeded by: Multi-member district
- Constituency: Niigata 5th (2017–2021); PR block (2021–2024)

Governor of Niigata Prefecture
- In office 25 October 2004 – 24 October 2016
- Monarch: Akihito
- Preceded by: Ikuo Hirayama
- Succeeded by: Ryuichi Yoneyama

Personal details
- Born: 15 September 1962 (age 63) Kamo, Niigata, Japan
- Party: Liberal Democratic
- Education: Kyoto University (LLB)
- Website: Official website

Hirohiko Izumida (泉田 裕彦, Izumida Hirohiko; born 15 September 1962) is a former Japanese politician who served as the Governor of Niigata Prefecture between 2004 and 2016.

== Personal history ==
- 15 September 1962: Born in Kamo in Niigata Prefecture.
- 1981: Graduated from Sanjo High School.
- 1987: Graduated from Kyoto University Law Department.
- 1987: Entered the Ministry of Economy, Trade and Industry.
- 1994: Attended the University of British Columbia as a visiting researcher.
- 2003: Appointed Head of the Gifu Prefecture Industrial Labor Bureau.
- 2004: Elected Governor of Niigata Prefecture. 2 days before taking office, the Niigata Chūetsu earthquake occurs, overshadowing his first year in office.
