= Niigata's Diet electoral districts =

Niigata's House of Representatives districts as of 2018

Niigata currently sends 9 elected members to the Diet of Japan, 7 to the House of Representatives and 2 to the House of Councillors. The prefecture lost 1 Councillor due to reapportionment in 2019.

== House of Representatives ==
The current House of Representatives Niigata delegation consists of 5 members of the LDP, 2 members of the CRA.

=== Constituency seats ===
District	Representative	Party	Incumbency
1st	Kō Uchiyama	LDP	9 February 2026 – present
2nd	Isato Kunisada	LDP	1 November 2021 – present
3rd	Hiroaki Saito	LDP	17 December 2012 – present
4th	Eiichiro Washio	LDP	9 February 2026 – present
5th	Shuichi Takatori	LDP	9 February 2026 – present

=== PR seats ===
Party	Representative	District contested	Incumbency
CRA	Chinami Nishimura	Niigata 1st	15 December 2014 – present
CRA	Makiko Kikuta	Niigata 2nd	10 November 2003 – present

== House of Councillors ==
The current House of Councillors Niigata delegation consists of 1 member of the CDP and 1 member of the LDP. The members are elected from the Niigata at-large district.

Class	Councillor	Party	Term ends	Incumbency
2022	Kazuhiro Kobayashi	LDP	2028	26 July 2022 – present
2025	Sakura Uchikoshi	CDP	2031	29 July 2019 – present
