= Musashi High School and Junior High School =

- 武蔵高等学校中学校
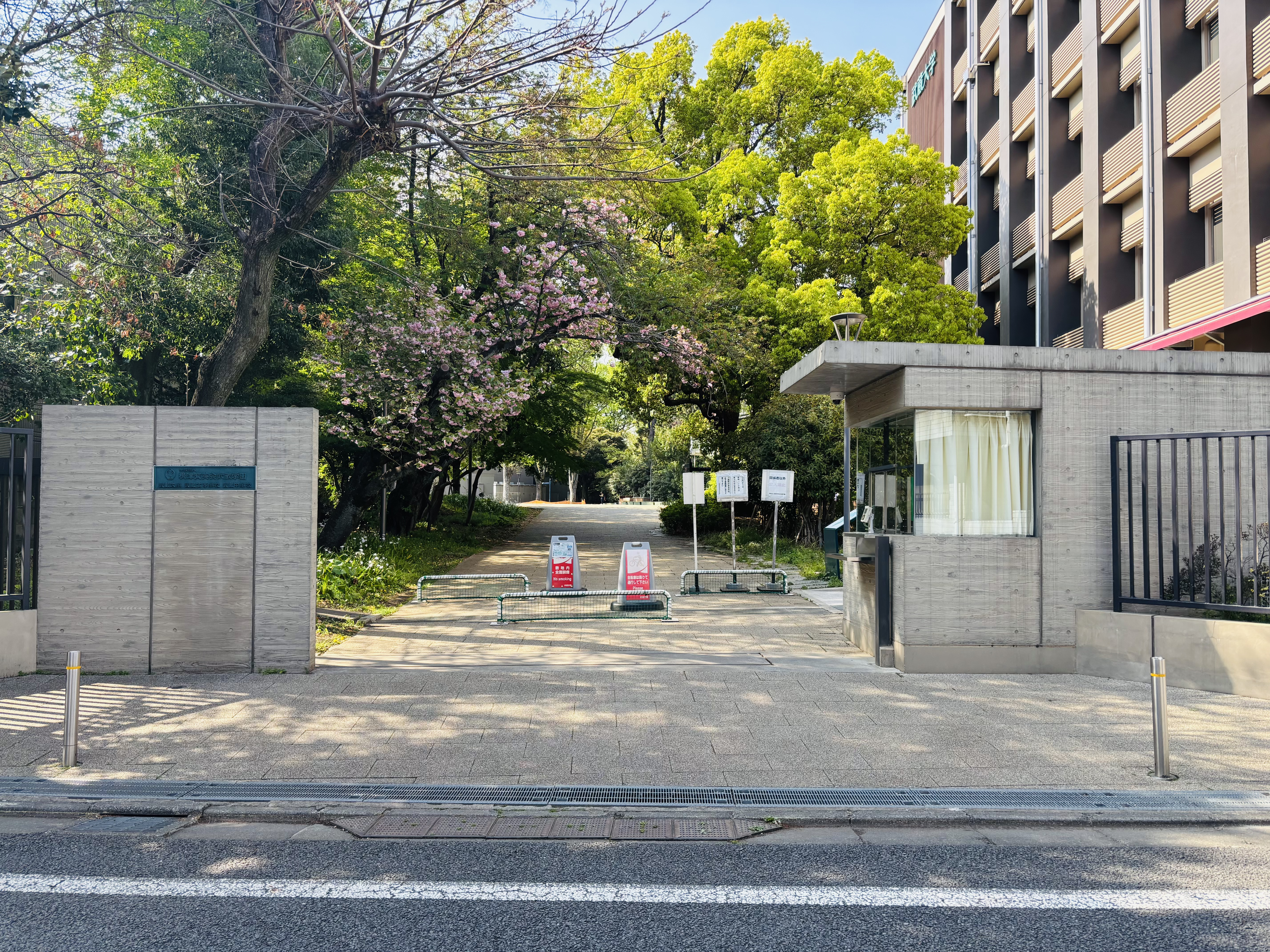

Location
- Nerima, Tokyo, 176-8535; Japan
- Coordinates: 35°44′10″N 139°40′2″E

Information
- Founded: 1922
- Founder: Nezu Kaichirō
- Principal: Hiromasa Kajitori
- Gender: Boys
- Classes: 24
- Website: www.musashi.ed.jp (in Japanese)

Musashi High School and Junior High School (武蔵高等学校 中学校, Musashi Kōtōgakkō Chūgakkō) is a private boys senior high school in Nerima, Tokyo, Japan. It is an affiliate of the Musashi University.

== History ==
The school was founded by industrialist Nezu Kaichirō in 1922 as Musashi High School, and used a seven-year system. After the education reforms of 1948, the school was divided into Musashi Senior High School and Musashi Junior High School. Musashi University was founded in 1949 and forms part of the same legal entity.

== Academics ==
An entrance exam is required for admission. The school aims to produce graduates who are "individuals capable of independent thought and research".

== Notable alumni ==
- Akito Arima (1930–2020), physicist and former Minister of Education
- Toshiro Fujita (1948–), physician and scientist
- Yoshitsugu Harada (1952–), politician
- Hiroshi Hoketsu (1941–), equestrian
- Shinya Inoué (1921–2019), biophysicist
- Kenkichi Iwasawa (1917–1998), Cole Prize-winning mathematician
- Tamio Kageyama (1947–1998), novelist
- Seiji Kameda (1964–), music producer
- Seiji Kihara (1970–), politician and former Deputy Chief Cabinet Secretary
- Takeaki Matsumoto (1959–), politician and former Minister of Foreign Affairs
- Hiroshi Miyazawa (1921–2012), former Minister of Justice
- Kiichi Miyazawa (1919–2007), former Prime Minister of Japan from 1991 to 1993
- Taizo Nishimuro (1935–2017), CEO of Japan Post Holdings
- Yoshinobu Nishizaki (1934–2010), film producer
- Shōichi Saba (1919–2012), former CEO of Toshiba
- Toshitsugu Saito (1944–), politician and former Minister of Defense
- Isao Sasaki (1942–), actor
- Masahiko Shibayama (1965–), politician and former Senior Vice-Minister for Internal Affairs and Communications
- Tsuneo Tamagawa (1925–2017), mathematician
- Naoki Tanaka (1940–), former Minister of Defense
- Morikazu Toda (1917–2010), physicist
- Hiroomi Umezawa (1924–1995), physicist
- Eiiti Wada (1931–), computer scientist

== See also ==
- List of high schools in Tokyo
