= Nezu =

Nezu may refer to:

- Nezu Shrine, a Shinto shrine in Tokyo, Japan
- Nezu Station, a railway station in Tokyo
- Nezu (My Hero Academia), a character in the manga series My Hero Academia
- Nezu, a character in the manga series Akira

== People with the surname ==
- Jinpachi Nezu (根津 甚八, 1947–2016), Japanese actor
- Nezu Kaichirō (根津 嘉一郎, 1860–1940), Japanese businessman, politician and philanthropist

== See also ==
- Nezu Museum, a museum in Tokyo
