= Musashi University =

University in Tokyo, Japan

Coordinates: 35°44′13″N 139°40′04″E

- 武蔵大学
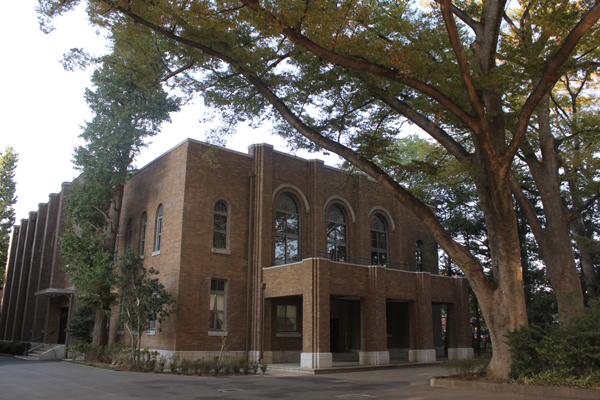
- Campus of Musashi University
- Type: Private
- Established: Founded 1922, Chartered 1949
- President: Wakichi Miyamoto
- Location: Nerima, Tokyo, Japan
- Campus: Ekoda
- Colors: Green
- Website: www.musashi.ac.jp

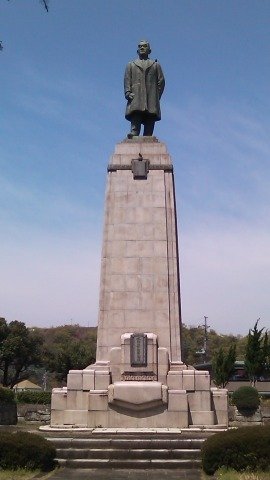
Nezu Kaichirō

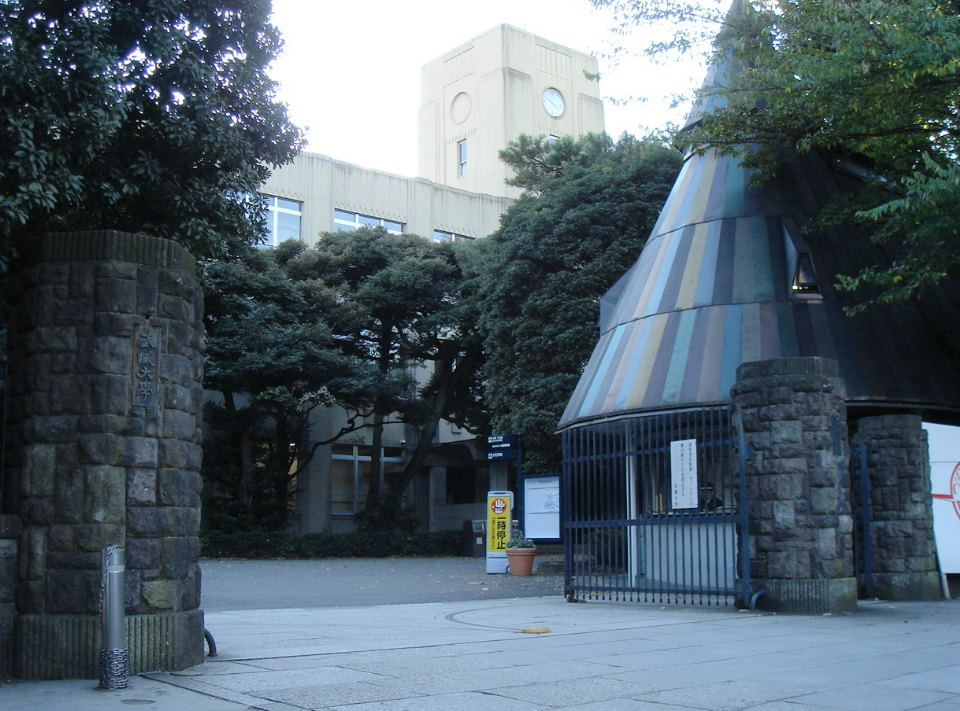
Musashi University

Musashi University (武蔵大学, Musashi Daigaku) is a university in Tokyo, Japan. The university grew out of the leading boys private high school, Musashi Junior and Senior High School, first established by businessman Nezu Kaichirō in 1922.

The university has faculties of economics established in 1949, humanities established in 1969, and sociology established in 1997, as well as three graduate schools.
