= Chinami Nishimura =

Chinami Nishimura may refer to:

- Chinami Nishimura (politician)
- Chinami Nishimura (voice actress)
