= Yuko Mori =

Japanese politician

Yūko Mori
- 森 裕子
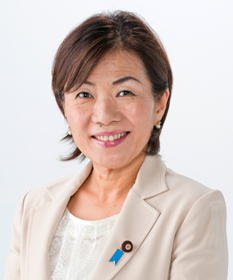
- Official portrait, 2011

Member of the House of Councillors
- Incumbent
- Assumed office 29 July 2025
- Constituency: National PR
- In office 26 July 2016 – 25 July 2022
- Preceded by: Yaichi Nakahara
- Succeeded by: Kazuhiro Kobayashi
- Constituency: Niigata at-large
- In office 29 July 2001 – 28 July 2013
- Preceded by: Michio Hasegawa
- Succeeded by: Naoki Kazama
- Constituency: Niigata at-large

Personal details
- Born: 20 April 1956 (age 70) Niigata City, Niigata, Japan
- Party: CDP (since 2020)
- Other political affiliations: LP (1999–2003); DPJ (2003–2012); PLF (2012); TPJ (2012); PLP (2012–2019); DPFP (2019–2020)
- Children: 3
- Education: Niigata University
- Website: Official website

Yuko Mori (森 裕子, Mori Yūko; born 20 April 1956) is a Japanese politician and a former member of the House of Councillors of Japan in the Diet (national legislature). She was previously with the Democratic Party of Japan and briefly belonged to the Tomorrow Party of Japan founded by Yukiko Kada, of which she was the deputy leader. A native of Niigata and graduate of Niigata University, she was elected to the House of Councillors for the first time in 2001 after serving in the town assembly of Yokogoshi, Niigata between 1999 and 2001.
