= Rokuzaemon Yoshida =

Japanese politician (born 1939)

- 吉田 六左エ門
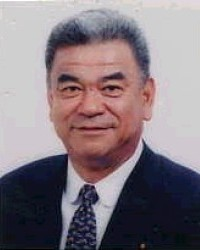
- Official portrait, 2003

Member of the House of Representatives
- In office 11 September 2005 – 21 July 2009
- Constituency: Hokuriku-Shin'etsu PR
- In office 20 October 1996 – 10 October 2003
- Preceded by: Constituency established
- Succeeded by: Chinami Nishimura
- Constituency: Niigata 1st

Member of the Niigata Prefectural Assembly
- In office 1983–1990

Personal details
- Born: 15 December 1939 (age 86) Niigata, Japan
- Party: Liberal Democratic
- Education: Waseda University

Rokuzaemon Yoshida (吉田 六左エ門, Yoshida Rokuzaemon; born 15 December 1939) is a retired Japanese politician of the Liberal Democratic Party, who served as a member of the House of Representatives in the Diet (national legislature).

== Early life ==
Yoshida is a native of Niigata, Niigata and a graduate of Waseda University.

== Political career ==
Yoshida was elected to the first of his two terms in the Niigata Prefectural Assembly in 1983.

After an unsuccessful run in 1993, he was elected to the House of Representatives for the first time in 1996 but lost his seat in 2003. He was re-elected in 2005, but was defeated again in 2009, after which he retired from politics.
