= Naoki Tanaka (politician) =

Japanese politician

- 田中 直紀
- Official portrait, 2001

Minister of Defence
- In office 13 January 2012 – 4 June 2012
- Prime Minister: Yoshihiko Noda
- Preceded by: Yasuo Ichikawa
- Succeeded by: Satoshi Morimoto

Member of the House of Councillors
- In office 26 July 1998 – 25 July 2016
- Preceded by: Kazuo Majima
- Succeeded by: Yuko Mori
- Constituency: Niigata at-large

Member of the House of Representatives
- In office 19 July 1993 – 27 September 1996
- Preceded by: Kunikichi Saitō
- Succeeded by: Constituency abolished
- Constituency: Fukushima 3rd
- In office 19 December 1983 – 24 January 1990
- Preceded by: Shigeru Suganami
- Succeeded by: Goji Sakamoto
- Constituency: Fukushima 3rd

Personal details
- Born: 鈴木 直紀 (Suzuki Naoki); 19 June 1940 (age 86) Kanazawa, Ishikawa, Japan
- Party: Democratic (2009–2016)
- Other political affiliations: LDP (1983–2008); Independent (2008–2009); DP (2016)
- Spouse: Makiko Tanaka (m. 1969)
- Relatives: Kakuei Tanaka (father-in-law)
- Education: Keio University

Naoki Tanaka (田中 直紀, Tanaka Naoki; born 19 June 1940 as Naoki Suzuki) is a former Japanese politician of the Democratic Party of Japan, who served as a member of the House of Councillors in the Diet (national legislature), from Niigata Prefectural electorate. He is a native of Kanazawa, Ishikawa and a graduate of Keio University.

When he married Makiko Tanaka he changed his family name to hers. In 1983, he entered the House of Representatives as a Liberal Democratic Party candidate, beginning his political career. He later served three terms in the House of Councillors.

Political offices
| Preceded by Yasuo Ichikawa | Minister of Defence; 2012 | Succeeded by Satoshi Morimoto |
