= Masamichi Kondo =

Japanese politician

- 近藤 正道

Member of the House of Councillors
- In office 26 July 2004 – 25 July 2010
- Preceded by: Kinuko Ōfuchi
- Succeeded by: Yaichi Nakahara
- Constituency: Niigata at-large

Member of the Niigata Prefectural Assembly
- In office 1987–2004
- Constituency: Niigata City

Personal details
- Born: 25 January 1947 (age 79) Izumozaki, Niigata, Japan
- Party: Social Democratic
- Other political affiliations: Socialist (1987–1996)
- Education: Chuo University
- Website: m-kondo.jp

Masamichi Kondo (近藤 正道, Kondō Masamichi; born January 25, 1947) is a Japanese politician and member of the House of Councillors for the Social Democratic Party (SDP). Elected in 2004 as an independent candidate with support of the Democratic Party of Japan and the SDP from Niigata Prefecture (No. 1 with 428,117 votes), he is, as of 2008, the only directly elected SDP member of the House of Councillors.

Kondo is a graduate of Chuo University and worked as a lawyer in Niigata. From 1987 to 2004 he was a member of the Niigata prefectural assembly.
