= Takahiro Kuroiwa =

Japanese politician (born 1966)

- 黒岩 宇洋
- Official portrait, 2010

Member of the House of Representatives
- In office 30 October 2024 – 23 January 2026
- Preceded by: Hiroaki Saito
- Succeeded by: Hiroaki Saito
- Constituency: Niigata 3rd
- In office 17 December 2014 – 14 October 2021
- Preceded by: Hiroaki Saito
- Succeeded by: Hiroaki Saito
- Constituency: Niigata 3rd
- In office 31 August 2009 – 16 November 2012
- Preceded by: Yamato Inaba
- Succeeded by: Hiroaki Saito
- Constituency: Niigata 3rd

Member of the House of Councillors
- In office 28 April 2002 – 29 July 2007
- Preceded by: Kazuo Majima
- Succeeded by: Ichiro Tsukada
- Constituency: Niigata at-large

Personal details
- Born: 13 October 1966 (age 60) Minamiuonuma, Niigata, Japan
- Party: CRA (since 2026)
- Other political affiliations: Independent (2002–2005; 2018–2019); DPJ (2005–2016); DP (2016–2018); CDP (2019–2026)
- Parent: Chizuko Kuroiwa (mother)
- Education: University of Tokyo

Takahiro Kuroiwa (黒岩宇洋, Kuroiwa Takahiro; born 13 October 1966) is a Japanese politician. He has been a member of the House of Representatives from 2024 to 2026, having previously served from 2009 to 2012 and from 2014 to 2021. From 2002 to 2007, he was a member of the House of Councillors.
