= Niigata 3rd district =

Japanese electoral district

Niigata 3rd District
- 新潟県第3区
- Parliamentary constituency for the Japanese House of Representatives
- Prefecture: Niigata
- Proportional Block: Hokuriku Shinetsu
- Electorate: 381,835 (as of 1 September 2022)

Current constituency
- Created: 1994
- Seats: One
- Party: LDP
- Representative: Hiroaki Saito

Niigata 3rd District (新潟県第3区, Niigata-ken dai-san-ku) is an electoral district of the Japanese House of Representatives, the lower house of the National Diet. The district was created as part of the move from multi-member districts to single-member districts in the House of Representatives.

== Areas covered ==
=== Current district ===
As of 2 February 2023, the areas covered by this district are as follows:

- Niigata
  - Kita
  - Akiha
- Shibata
- Murakami
- Gosen
- Agano
- Tainai
- Kitakanbara District
- Higashikanbara District
- Iwafune District

As part of the 2022 redistricting, Kita ward is now fully under the jurisdiction of the 3rd district, and Akiha Ward was gained from the 4th district.

=== Areas 2013–2022 ===
From the first redistricting in 2013, until the second redistricting in 2022, the areas covered by this district were as follows:

- Niigata (city)
  - Kita Ward (former city of Toyosaka)
    - Centra Government Office (excluding Hosoyama, Kosugi, Junimae and Yokogoshi)
    - Sumireno 4 within North Branch Office jurisdiction
- Shibata
- Murakami
- Gosen
- Agano
- Tainai
- Kitakanbara District
- Higashikanbara District
- Iwafune District

As part of the 2013 redistricting, the 3rd district gained sections of Kita Ward from the 1st district.

=== Areas from before 2013 ===
From the creation of the district in 1994, until the first redistricting in 2013, the areas covered bny this district were as follows:

- Shibata
- Murakami
- Gosen
- Toyosaka
- Kitakambara District
- Part of Nakakanbara District
  - Muramatsu
- Higashikanbara District
- Iwafune District

== Elected representatives ==
Representatives	Party	Years served	Notes
Yamato Inaba	LDP	1996 – 2009	
Takahiro Kuroiwa	DPJ	2009–2012	
Hiroaki Saito	LDP	2012 – 2014	
Takahiro Kuroiwa	DPJ	2014 – 2017	
Takahiro Kuroiwa	Indep.	2017–2021	
Hiroaki Saito	LDP	2021 – 2024	
Takahiro Kuroiwa	CDP	2024 – 2026	
Hiroaki Saito	LDP	2026 –	

== Election results ==
‡ - Also ran in the Hokuriku Shinetsu PR election

‡‡ - Also ran and won in the Hokuriku Shinetsu PR election

=== Elections in the 2020s ===
2026
Party	Candidate	Votes	%	±%
LDP	Hiroaki Saitō ^{‡}	115,991	54.6	▲10.1
Centrist Reform	Takahiro Kuroiwa ^{‡}	76,452	36.0	▼13.3
Sanseitō	Keiko Sakuma	19,878	9.4	
Registered electors		364,214		
Turnout		212,321	59.15	▲0.33
LDP gain from Centrist Reform				

2024
Party	Candidate	Votes	%	±%
CDP	Takahiro Kuroiwa ^{‡}	105,275	49.3	▲2.9
LDP	Hiroaki Saitō ^{‡‡}	94,984	44.5	▼9.1
Ishin	Yūichirō Yoshimura ^{‡}	13,370	6.3	
Registered electors		370,462		
Turnout			58.82	▼6.22
CDP gain from LDP				

2021
Party	Candidate	Votes	%	±%
LDP	Hiroaki Saito^{‡} (incumbent - Hokuriku Shinetsu PR)	102,564	53.6	▲4.5
CDP	Takahiro Kuroiwa^{‡} (incumbent) (endorsed by the JCP)	88,744	46.4	New
Registered electors		298,289		
Majority		13,820	7.2	▲7.1
Turnout		194,007	65.0	▲1.7
LDP gain from Independent		Swing		

=== Elections in the 2010s ===
2017
Party	Candidate	Votes	%	±%
Independent	Takahiro Kuroiwa (incumbent) (endorsed by the JCP, SDP and the Liberal Party)	95,644	49.2	New
LDP	Hiroaki Saito^{‡} (incumbent - Hokuriku Shinetsu PR) (endorsed by Komeito)	95,594	49.1	▲4.9
Independent	Yoichi Mimura	3,375	1.7	New
Registered electors		312,835		
Majority		50	0.1	▼4.8
Turnout		198,056	63.3	▲8.3
Independent gain from Democratic		Swing		

2014
Party	Candidate	Votes	%	±%
Democratic	Takahiro Kuroiwa^{‡}	82,619	49.1	▲7.7
LDP	Hiroaki Saito^{‡‡} (incumbent) (endorsed by Komeito)	74,319	44.2	▲2.8
JCP	Makoto Ito	11,214	6.7	▲0.5
Registered electors		314,215		
Majority		8,300	4.9	▼3.9
Turnout		171,404	54.6	▼5.0
Democratic gain from LDP		Swing		

2012
Party	Candidate	Votes	%	±%
LDP	Hiroaki Saito^{‡} (endorsed by Komeito)	92,280	50.2	▲17.4
Democratic	Takahiro Kuroiwa^{‡} (incumbent) (endorsed by the PNP)	76,135	41.4	▼24.6
JCP	Shinichi Tanaka	11,465	6.2	New
Independent	Yoichi Mimura	4,075	2.2	New
Registered electors		318,635		
Majority		16,145	8.8	▼24.4
Turnout		189,970	59.6	▼14.5
LDP gain from Democratic		Swing		

=== Elections in the 2000s ===
2009
Party	Candidate	Votes	%	±%
Democratic	Takahiro Kuroiwa^{‡}	154,985	66.0	New
LDP	Yamato Inaba^{‡} (incumbent)	77,058	32.8	▼17.3
Happiness Realization	Tomikawa Masamitsu	2,668	1.1	New
Registered electors		323,892		
Majority		77,927	33.2	New
Turnout		239,874	74.1	▲4.2
Democratic gain from LDP		Swing		

2005
Party	Candidate	Votes	%	±%
LDP	Yamato Inaba^{‡} (incumbent)	111,695	50.1	▼5.8
Social Democratic	Masuji Miyazaki^{‡}	73,114	32.8	▼3.4
People's New	Yasushi Suzuki^{‡}	23,845	10.7	New
JCP	Shinichi Tanaka	14,132	6.3	▼1.6
Registered electors		328,478		
Majority		38,581	17.3	▼2.4
Turnout		229,475	69.9	▲8.1
LDP hold		Swing		

2003
Party	Candidate	Votes	%	±%
LDP	Yamato Inaba^{‡} (incumbent)	108,627	55.9	▲4.7
Social Democratic	Hachiro Kuramochi^{‡}	70,256	36.2	▲20.5
JCP	Shinichi Tanaka	15,399	7.9	▲1.0
Registered electors		328,821		
Majority		38,371	19.7	▼5.2
Turnout		203,080	61.8	▼6.8
LDP hold		Swing		

2000
Party	Candidate	Votes	%	±%
LDP	Yamato Inaba^{‡} (incumbent)	111,819	51.2	▲15.2
Liberal	Saburo Shirasawa^{‡}	57,409	26.3	New
Social Democratic	Hachiro Kuramochi^{‡}	34,320	15.7	New
JCP	Keizo Inagaki	15,045	6.9	▲0.1
Registered electors		Unknown		
Majority		54,410	24.9	▲18.8
Turnout		Unknown	68.6	▼2.4
LDP hold		Swing		

=== Elections in the 1990s ===
1996
Party	Candidate	Votes	%	±%
LDP	Yamato Inaba^{‡} (incumbent - former Niigata 2nd District)	79,635	36.0	New
Independent	Uichiro Iwamura	66,067	29.9	New
New Progressive Party (Japan)	Saburo Shirasawa (incumbent - former Niigata 2nd District)	60,223	27.3	New
JCP	Shoichi Tasaki	15,110	6.8	New
Registered electors		322,841		
Majority		13,568	6.1	New
Turnout		229,056	71.0	New
LDP win (new seat)				
