= Yamato Inaba =

Japanese politician

- 稲葉 大和
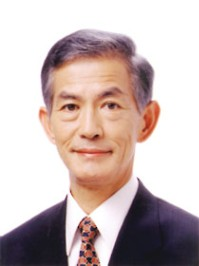
- Official portrait, 2003

Member of the House of Representatives
- In office 18 July 1993 – 21 July 2009
- Preceded by: Takashi Satō
- Succeeded by: Takahiro Kuroiwa
- Constituency: Niigata 2nd (1993–1996); Niigata 3rd (1996–2009)

Personal details
- Born: 12 November 1943 (age 82) Chiyoda, Tokyo, Japan
- Party: Liberal Democratic
- Parent: Osamu Inaba (father)
- Relatives: Keisuke Inaba (uncle)
- Education: Chuo University

Yamato Inaba (稲葉 大和, Inaba Yamato; born 12 November 1943) is a former Japanese politician, who was a member of House of Representatives and the Liberal Democratic Party.

Born in Chiyoda, Tokyo he graduated from Chuo University in 1966. He was elected for the first time in 1993 after an unsuccessful run in 1990. He represented the 3rd District of Niigata Prefecture until 2009.
