= Satoshi Morimoto =

Japanese scholar and politician

- 森本 敏
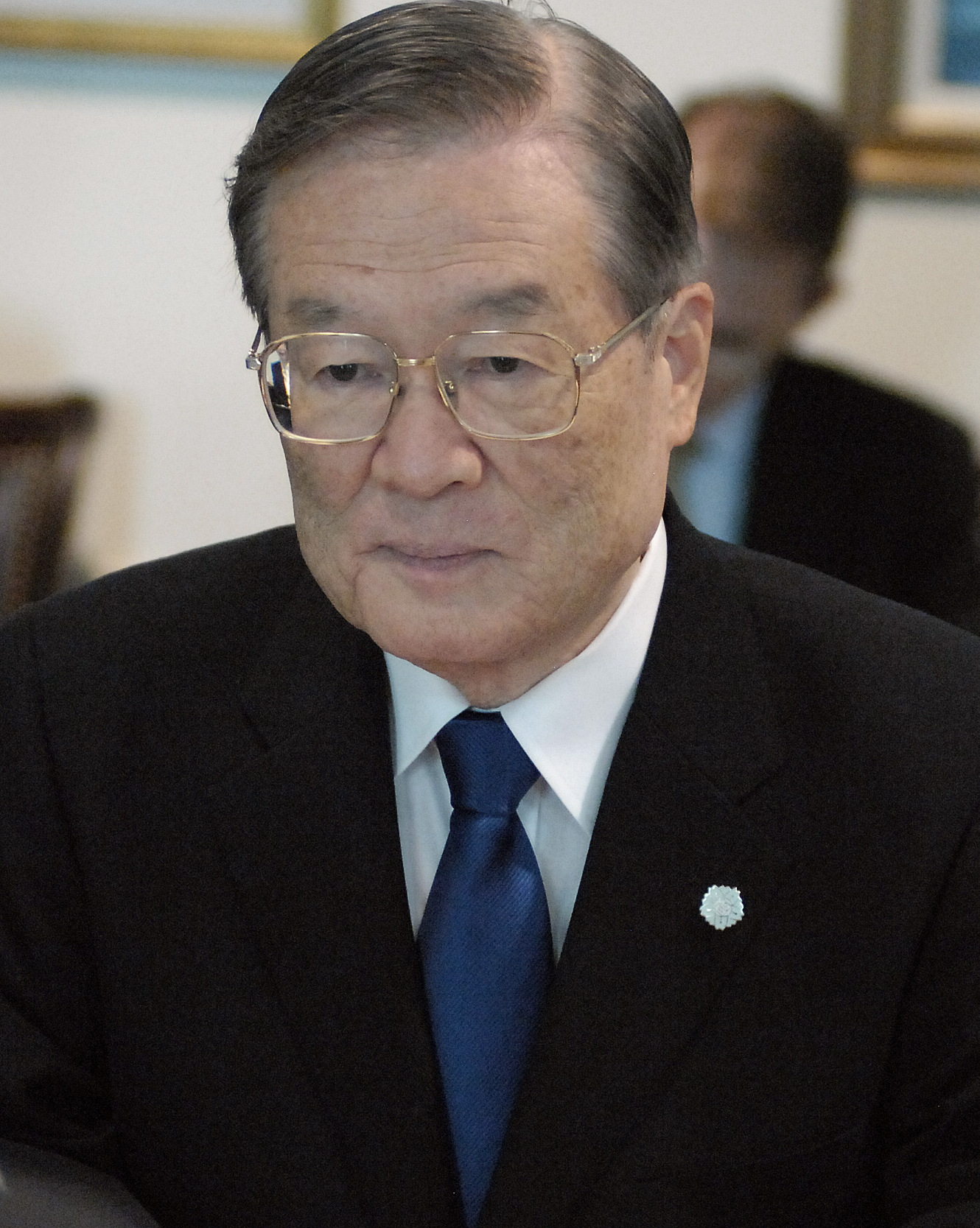
- Morimoto in 2012

Minister of Defense
- In office 3 June 2012 – 26 December 2012
- Prime Minister: Yoshihiko Noda
- Preceded by: Naoki Tanaka
- Succeeded by: Itsunori Onodera

Personal details
- Born: 15 March 1941 (age 85) Tokyo, Japan
- Party: Independent
- Education: National Defense Academy of Japan; Tufts University
- Website: Official webpage

Military service
- Branch/service: Japan Air Self-Defense Force
- Years of service: 1965–1979
- Rank: Major

Satoshi Morimoto (森本 敏, Morimoto Satoshi; born 15 March 1941) is a Japanese politician, scholar and critic specializing in international politics and national security. He was Minister of Defense from July to December 2012, and is professor at Takushoku University and member of the Congressional Forum for New Japan.

== Early life and education ==
Morimoto was born in Tokyo on 15 March 1941. He graduated from National Defense Academy of Japan in 1965. He received a master's degree from the Fletcher School at Tufts University in 1980.

== Career ==
After graduation, Morimoto served with Japan Air Self-Defense Force until 1979 when he joined the Ministry of Foreign Affairs.In 1992, he left the Ministry of Foreign Affairs and became a chief researcher at Nomura Research Institute (from 1992 to 2001). After teaching at several universities and graduate schools in Japan, Morimoto became a professor at Takushoku University (International Studies). In 2005, he became the head manager of Institute of World Studies at Takushoku University. In 2016 he backs Chancellor of Takushoku University.

He served as an aide to then defense minister Yasukazu Hamada who served in Taro Aso's cabinet. Morimoto was appointed defense minister on 3 June 2012 in a cabinet shuffle, replacing Tanaka Naoki. He is the current Policy adviser to the Japanese Defense Minister.

He was the first non-politician defense minister of Japan and third defense minister appointed to the Noda cabinet. Morimoto is affiliated with the traditionalist lobby Nippon Kaigi.

As an international political scientists, specialised in National Security, he has attended a number of expert committees and advisory councils held by the Japanese government.

He was instrumental in implementing the Three Principles (Transfer of Defence Equipment) policies in 2014, and the launch of Japan's only international defence trade show and conference, MAST Asia. www.mastconfex.com

Political offices
Preceded by Naoki Tanaka	Minister of Defence; June–December 2012	Succeeded by Itsunori Onodera
