= Naoki Kazama =

Japanese politician

- 風間 直樹
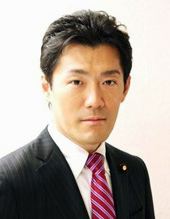
- Official portrait, 2012

Member of the House of Councillors
- In office 29 July 2007 – 28 July 2019
- Preceded by: Multi-member district
- Succeeded by: Sakura Uchikoshi
- Constituency: National PR (2007–2013); Niigata at-large (2013–2019)

Member of the Niigata Prefectural Assembly
- In office April 1999 – April 2003
- Constituency: Jōetsu City

Personal details
- Born: 22 October 1966 (age 59) Myōkō, Niigata, Japan
- Party: CDP (since 2017)
- Other political affiliations: LDP (1999–2003); Independent (2003–2007); DPJ (2007–2016); DP (2016–2017)
- Education: Keio University
- Website: Official website

Naoki Kazama (風間 直樹, Kazama Naoki; born 22 October 1966) is a Japanese politician of the Constitutional Democratic Party of Japan and a member of the House of Councillors in the Diet (national legislature). A native of Myōkō, Niigata and graduate of Keio University, he had served in the assembly of Niigata Prefecture between 1999 and 2003. He was elected to the House of Councillors for the first time in 2007.
