= Niigata 1st district =

Legislative district of Japan

Niigata 1st District
- National Diet constituency for the Japanese House of Representatives
- Numbered map of Niigata Prefecture single-member districts
- Prefecture: Niigata
- Proportional District: Hokuriku-Shinetsu Block
- Electorate: 434,016 (2021)

Current constituency
- Created: 1994
- Seats: One
- Party: LDP
- Representative: Kō Uchiyama
- Created from: Niigata 1st SNTV "medium-sized" district

Niigata 1st district (新潟県第1区, Niigata dai-ikku or 新潟1区, Niigata ikku) is a constituency of the House of Representatives in the National Diet of Japan (national legislature), represented by Chinami Nishimura of the Constitutional Democratic Party of Japan since 2017. As of 2017, 439,968 eligible voters were registered in the district

== Area ==
From its creation the district has been located in Niigata City, the capital of Niigata Prefecture. After redistricting in 2022 it comprises two distinct parts.

=== Niigata City ===
- Chūō Ward
- Higashi Ward
- Kōnan Ward

=== Sado Island ===
- Sado City

== History ==
Before 1996, the amendment of Public Offices Election Act that introduced FPTP “small” voting system, this area had been part of former Niigata 1st district where three representatives had been elected by single non-transferable vote. The two candidates contesting the former 1st district, Rokuzaemon Yoshida (LDP) and Nobuyuki Sekiyama (DPJ), had continued to run until 2000.

In the 2003 general election, the Democratic Party of Japan fielded Chinami Nishimura, former Member of Niigata Prefecture Assembly, who defeated Yoshida in the 2003, 2005 and 2009 elections. In 2012, when the Democratic Party lost the reins of government, Tooru Ishizaki, a new LDP candidate, defeated Nishimura. In 2014, Nishimura was defeated again, but elected through the proportional representation block.

In the 2017 general election, Nishimura joined the Constitutional Democratic Party, and defeated Ishizaki. Ishizaki was elected through the proportional representation block. In 2020, after Ishizaki was indicted for verbally and physically assaulting his secretary, he left the LDP and ran as a Nippon Ishin no Kai candidate in the 2021 elections.

== List of representatives ==
Representative	Party	Dates	Notes
Rokuzaemon Yoshida	LDP	1996 – 2003	
Chinami Nishimura	DPJ	2003 – 2012	
Tōru Ishizaki	LDP	2012 – 2017	
Chinami Nishimura	CDP	2017 – 2026	
Kō Uchiyama	LDP	2026 –	

== Election results ==
2026
Party	Candidate	Votes	%	±%
LDP	Kō Uchiyama	92,578	46.8	▲14.5
Centrist Reform	Chinami Nishimura (Won a seat in the PR Block	73,167	37.0	▼15.8
Sanseitō	Sachio Koike	15,492	7.8	
Ishin	Kazunari Itō	10,092	5.1	▼4.1
JCP	Takeo Nakamura	6,574	3.3	▼2.4
Turnout		197,903	56.42	▲2.4
LDP gain from Centrist Reform				

2024
Party	Candidate	Votes	%	±%
CDP	Chinami Nishimura	99,487	52.73	▲0.16
LDP	Ichirō Tsukada	61,025	32.35	▼7.52
Ishin	Tooru Ishizaki	17,299	9.17	▲1.60
JCP	Takeo Nakamura	10,845	5.75	New
Turnout		188,656	53.99	▼3.26

2021
Party	Candidate	Votes	%	±%
CDP	Chinami Nishimura	127,365	52,57	▼0.54
LDP	Ichirō Tsukada (elected in PR block)	96,591	39.87	▼7.02
Ishin	Tooru Ishizaki	18,333	7.57	
Turnout			57.25	▲1,11
CDP hold				

General election 2017: Niigata 1st district
Party	Candidate	Votes	%	±%
CDP	Chinami Nishimura	128,045	53.1	▲6.1
LDP	Tooru Ishizaki (elected in PR block)	113,045	46.9	▼0.1
Turnout		241,090	56.14	▲9.17
CDP gain from LDP				

General election 2014: Niigata 1st district
Party	Candidate	Votes	%	±%
LDP	Tooru Ishizaki	92,656	47.0	▲2.9
Democratic	Chinami Nishimura (elected in PR block)	84,573	42.9	▲7.3
JCP	Akihiro Machida	20,037	10.2	▲2.4
Turnout		197,266	46.97	▼6.23
LDP hold				

General election 2012: Niigata 1st district
Party	Candidate	Votes	%	±%
LDP	Tooru Ishizaki	97,010	44.1	▲9.9
Democratic	Chinami Nishimura	78,283	35.6	▼24.5
Tomorrow	Kou Uchimura	27,749	12.6	N/A
JCP	Katsutoshi Takeda	17,071	7.8	▲1.4
Turnout		220,113	53.20	▼14.28
LDP gain from Democratic				

General election 2009: Niigata 1st district
Party	Candidate	Votes	%	±%
Democratic	Chinami Nishimura	169,389	60.1	▲10.4
LDP	Rokuzaemon Yoshida	90,626	32.2	▼10.6
JCP	Katsutoshi Takeda	17,919	6.4	▼1.1
Happiness Realization	Koji Matsumoto	3,690	1.3	N/A
Turnout		281,624	67.48	▼0.86
Democratic hold				

General election 2005: Niigata 1st district
Party	Candidate	Votes	%	±%
Democratic	Chinami Nishimura	136,391	49.7	▼1.4
LDP	Rokuzaemon Yoshida (elected in PR block)	117,652	42.8	▲1.6
JCP	Yukio Kawamata	18,134	7.8	▼2.5
Turnout		274,584	66.62	▲9.6
Democratic hold				

General election 2003: Niigata 1st district
Party	Candidate	Votes	%	±%
Democratic	Chinami Nishimura	119,297	51.1	▲16.0
LDP	Rokuzaemon Yoshida	96,107	41.2	▼2.0
JCP	Yukio Kawamata	18,134	7.8	▼2.5
Turnout		274,584	57.02	▼3.37
Democratic gain from LDP				
