= Ichiro Tsukada =

Japanese politician

- 塚田 一郎
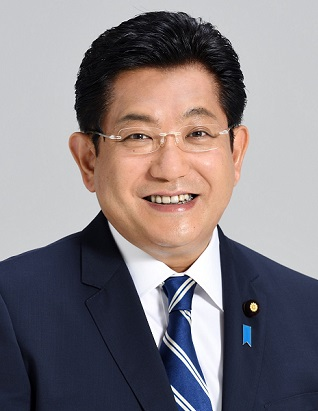
- Official portrait, 2018

Member of the House of Representatives
- In office 5 November 2021 – 9 October 2024
- Constituency: Hokuriku-Shin'etsu PR

Member of the House of Councillors
- In office 29 July 2007 – 28 July 2019
- Preceded by: Takahiro Kuroiwa
- Succeeded by: Seat abolished
- Constituency: Niigata at-large

Personal details
- Born: 27 December 1963 (age 62) Niigata City, Niigata, Japan
- Party: Liberal Democratic
- Parent: Jūichirō Tsukada (father)
- Relatives: Tōru Tsukada (brother)
- Education: Chuo University; Boston University

Ichiro Tsukada (塚田 一郎, Tsukada Ichirō; born December 27, 1963) is a Japanese politician of the Liberal Democratic Party. He was a member of the House of Councillors between 2007 and 2019 and the House of Representatives from 2021 to 2024. A graduate of Chuo University and Boston University, he was elected to the House of Councillors for the first time in 2007 after unsuccessful runs in 2002 and 2004.

Tsukada's father was Jūichirō Tsukada the Governor of Niigata Prefecture from 1961 to 1966.

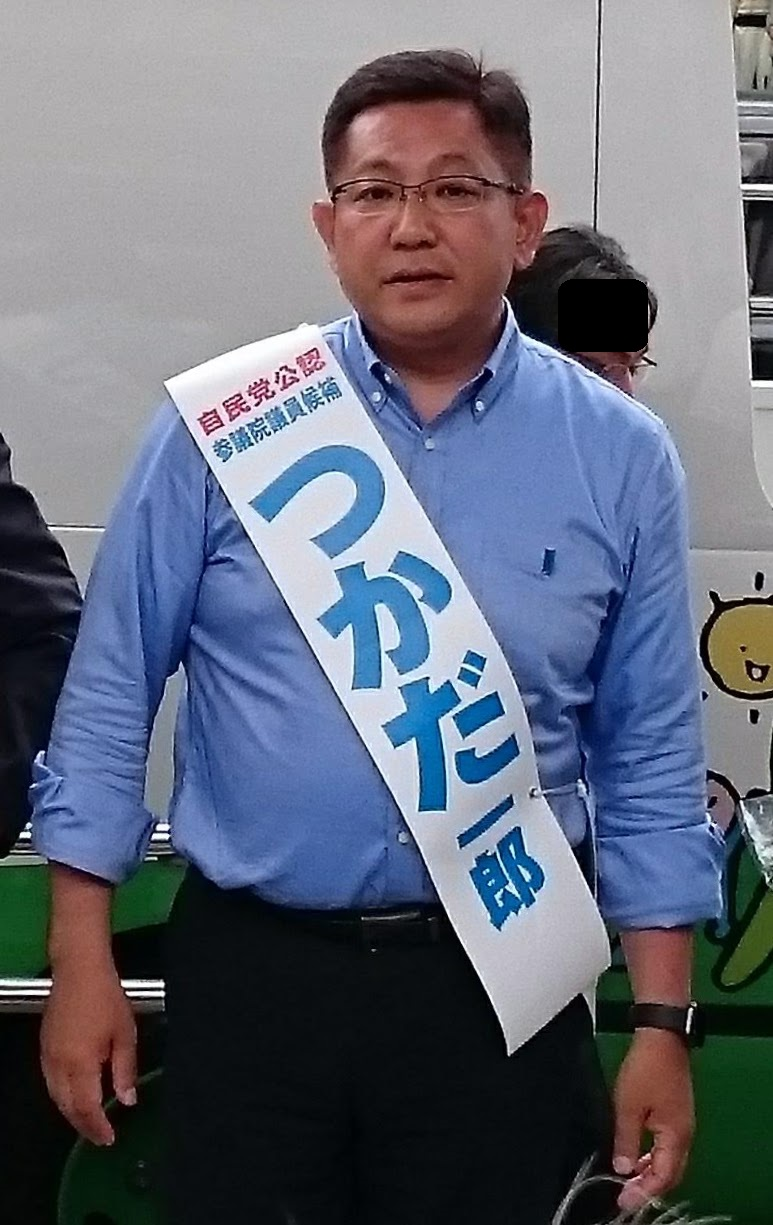
Tsukada in 2019
