= Hiroaki Saito =

Japanese politician (born 1976)

- 斎藤 洋明
- Official portrait, 2024

Member of the House of Representatives; from Hokuriku-Shin'etsu
- Incumbent
- Assumed office 18 December 2012
- Preceded by: Takahiro Kuroiwa
- Constituency: See list: Niigata 3rd (2012–2014); PR block (2014–2021); Niigata 3rd (2021–2024); PR block (2024–2026); Niigata 3rd (2026–present)

Personal details
- Born: 8 December 1976 (age 49) Kamihayashi, Niigata, Japan
- Party: Liberal Democratic (Shikōkai)
- Education: Gakushuin University; Kobe University

Hiroaki Saito (斎藤洋明, Saito Hiroaki; born 8 December 1976) is a Japanese politician serving as a member of the House of Representatives since 2012. He has served as deputy minister of finance since 2024.
