= Kazuhiro Kobayashi =

Japanese politician (born 1973)

- 小林 一大
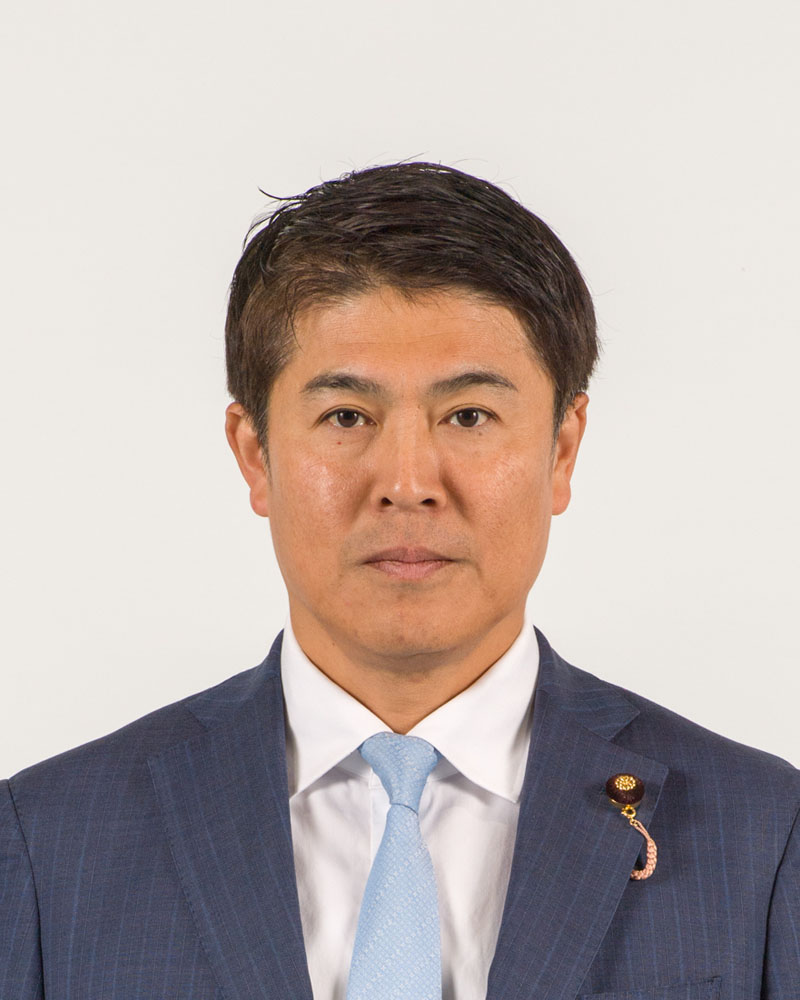
- Official portrait, 2024

Member of the House of Councillors
- Incumbent
- Assumed office 26 July 2022
- Preceded by: Yuko Mori
- Constituency: Niigata at-large

Member of the Niigata Prefectural Assembly
- In office 30 April 2007 – 2022
- Constituency: Akiha Ward

Personal details
- Born: 12 June 1973 (age 53) Niitsu, Niigata, Japan
- Party: Liberal Democratic
- Parent: Ichizo Kobayashi (father)
- Education: University of Tokyo

Kazuhiro Kobayashi (小林一大, Kobayashi Kazuhiro; born 12 June 1973) is a Japanese politician serving as a member of the House of Councillors since 2022. From 2007 to 2022, he was a member of the Niigata Prefectural Assembly. He is the son of Ichizo Kobayashi.
