= Sakura Uchikoshi =

Japanese politician

- 打越 さく良
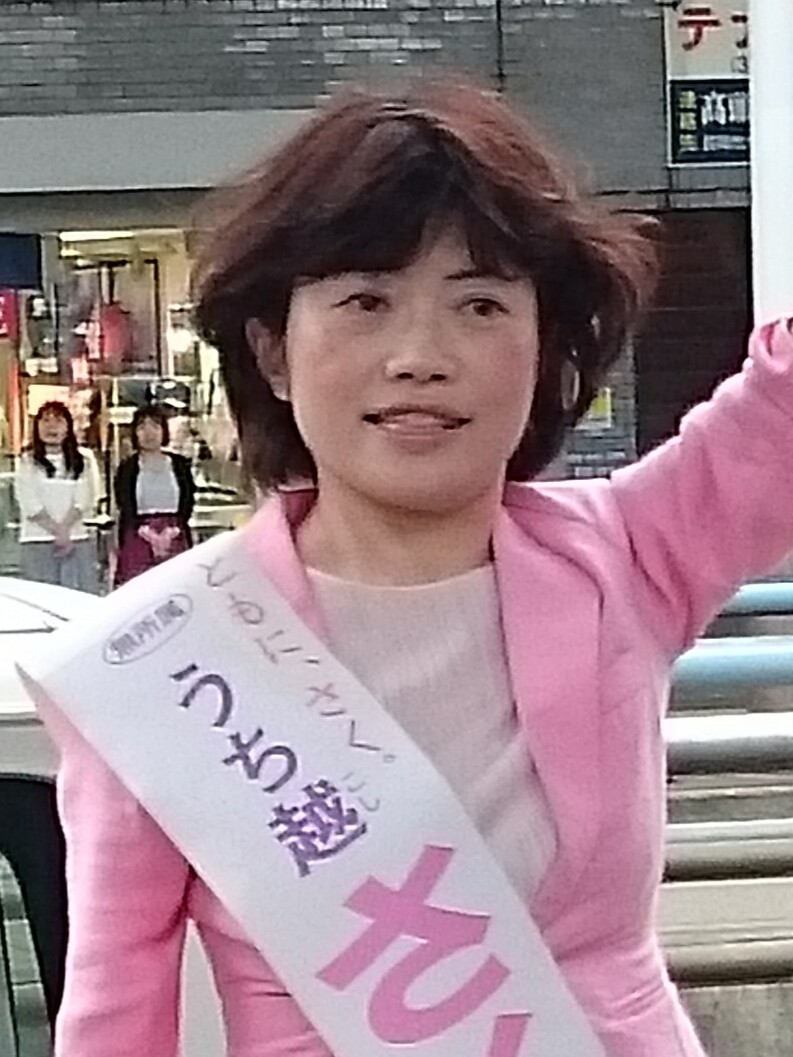
- Uchikoshi in 2019

Member of the House of Councillors
- Incumbent
- Assumed office 29 July 2019
- Preceded by: Naoki Kazama
- Constituency: Niigata at-large

Personal details
- Born: 6 January 1968 (age 58) Asahikawa, Hokkaido, Japan
- Party: Constitutional Democratic
- Education: University of Tokyo

Sakura Uchikoshi (born Sakura Muraki on January 6, 1968, in Hokkaido, Japan) is a Japanese politician who has served as a member of the House of Councillors of Japan since 2019. She represents the Niigata at-large district and is a member of the Constitutional Democratic Party of Japan.

She is a member of the following committees (as of 2021):

- Committee on Health, Welfare and Labour
- Committee on Budget
- Special Committee on North Korean Abduction Issue and Related Matters
- Commission on the Constitution
