= Toshiro Fujita =

Japanese physician-scientist

Toshiro Fujita. M.D., PhD (1948-) is a Japanese physician-scientist. He is a professor emeritus of The University of Tokyo and received the Medal of Honor (Japan) (with purple ribbon). He served as chair and director for Japan Societies of Internal Medicine, Nephrology, Endocrinology and Hypertension.

== Education ==
He graduated from Musashi High school (Tokyo, Japan) in 1966 and received an M.D. degree from Keio University in 1972 and a PhD there in 1980.

== Career ==
He conducted research in nephrology, hypertension and internal medicine. His most notable research is salt-induced hypertension and the role of the kidney. His work spans basic to clinical research. His hypothesis was validated by a double-blind clinical trial.

In 1976 he was a visiting fellow at NIH. From 1978 to 1988 he lectured at Tsukuba University and The University of Tokyo, Faculty of Medicine, Dept of Nephrology and Endocrinology and became an associate professor at the latter in 1989. In 1995 he became a full professor and the chair in medicine. He moved to the Research Center for Advanced of Science & Technology in 2012 and was the principal investigator of CREST-JST. In 2012 he became Professor emeritus.

== Recognition ==
His work earned international and domestic awards such as the Franz Volhard Award, AHA Excellence Award for Hypertension Research, Takamine Jokichi award, Distinguished award from Japanese society of Hypertension and Okamoto International Award.

- 2008 - Jyokichi Takamine Award
- 2009 - American Heart Association(AHA) Arthur Corcoran Memorial Lecture Award
- 2010 - Distinguished Award of Japan Society of Hypertension
- 2013 - European Society of Hypertension(ESH) Honorary Membership
- 2013 - Okamoto International Award
- 2014 - International Society of Hypertension(ISH) Franz Volhard Award
- 2014 - AHA The Excellence Award Hypertension Research
- 2015 - Medals of Honor (Japan) (with purple ribbon)
