= Niigata at-large district =

Japan House of Councillors constituency

- 新潟県選挙区
- Parliamentary constituency for the House of Councillors
- Prefecture: Niigata
- Electorate: 1,842,601 (as of September 2022)

Current constituency
- Created: 1947
- Seats: 2
- Councillors: Class of 2019: Sakura Uchikoshi (CDP); Class of 2022: Kazuhiro Kobayashi (LDP)

The Niigata at-large district (Japanese: 新潟県選挙区, Hepburn: Niigata-ken senkyoku) is a constituency that represents Niigata Prefecture in the House of Councillors in the Diet of Japan. Since July 2019, it has two Councillors in the 242-member house, a decrease from its previous contingent of 3. Similar to other rural two seat districts in Northern Japan such as the Iwate at-large district, it often shows a willingness to buck the LDP and instead vote for opposition backed candidates, such as in 2019. Nonetheless, the LDP won the district by six points in the 2022 elections, and Uchikoshi only won by a margin of four points.

== Outline ==
The constituency represents the entire population of Niigata Prefecture and has 1,925,565 registered voters as of September 2015. Since the first House of Councillors election in 1947 Niigata has elected four Councillors to six-year terms, two at alternating elections held every three years. The district's number of voters is the third-lowest of the 10 prefectures that are represented by four Councillors; by comparison, the Hokkaido, Hyogo at-large district and Fukuoka districts each have more than 4 million voters but are represented by the same number of Councillors as Niigata. To address this malapportionment in representation, a 2015 revision of the Public Officers Election Law decrease the representation of Niigata, Miyagi and Nagano districts to two Councillors while increasing Hyogo, Hokkaido and Fukuoka districts to six Councillors. This change took effect at the 2016 election, after which time, Niigata will elect only one Councillor during every election.

The Councillors currently representing Niigata are:

- Kazuhiro Kobayashi (LDP, first term; term ends in 2028)
- Sakura Uchikoshi (CDP, first term; term ends in 2025)

== Elected Councillors ==
Class of 1947		Election year	Class of 1950 (1947: 3-year term)	
Bunkichi Tamura (Ind.) (Note: Joined Ryokufūkai (1947–60) after the election)	Kyōhei Shimojō (Social Democratic)	1947	Kazuo Kitamua (Liberal)	Yoshio Fujita (Ind.)
Bunkichi Tamura (Ind.)	Kyōhei Shimojō (Social Democratic)	1950	Kazuo Kitamura (Note: Resigned 29 March 1955) (Liberal)	Toshiei Kiyosawa (Social Democratic)
Bunkichi Tamura (Ryokufūkai)	Yaheiji Saikawa (Note: Died in office 16 December 1958) (Liberal)	1953	Kazuo Kitamura (Liberal)	Toshiei Kiyosawa (Social Democratic)
Bunkichi Tamura (Ryokufūkai)	Yaheiji Saikawa (Liberal)	(Note: Held 15 May 1955)1955 by-election	Makie Koyanagi (LDP) (Note: First elected in May 1955 as a Japan Democratic Party candidate, before the merger which created the LDP in November 1955.)	Toshiei Kiyosawa (Social Democratic)
Bunkichi Tamura (Ryokufūkai)	Yaheiji Saikawa (Liberal)	1956	Makie Koyanagi (LDP)	Toshiei Kiyosawa (Social Democratic)
Goro Takeuchi (Social Democratic)	Yoshio Sato (Note: Died in office 29 August 1967) (LDP)	1959	Makie Koyanagi (LDP)	Toshiei Kiyosawa (Social Democratic)
Goro Takeuchi (Social Democratic)	Yoshio Sato (LDP)	1962	Makie Koyanagi (LDP)	Zentaro Sugiyama (Social Democratic)
Goro Takeuchi (Social Democratic)	Yoshio Sato (LDP)	1965	Makie Koyanagi (LDP)	Zentaro Sugiyama (Social Democratic)
Goro Takeuchi (Social Democratic)	Takashi Sato (Note: Resigned 4 November 1976) (LDP)	1967 by-election (Note: Held 5 November 1967)	Makie Koyanagi (LDP)	Zentaro Sugiyama (Social Democratic)
Goro Takeuchi (Social Democratic)	Takashi Sato (LDP)	1968	Jūichiro Tsukada (Ind.) (Note: Later joined the LDP)	Makoto Matsui (Note: Died in office 10 November 1972) (Social Democratic)
Zentaro Sugiyama (Social Democratic)	Takashi Sato (LDP)	1971	Jūichiro Tsukada (Ind.)	Makoto Matsui (Social Democratic)
Zentaro Sugiyama (Social Democratic)	Takashi Sato (LDP)	(Note: Held 17 December 1972)1972 by-election	Jūichiro Tsukada (Ind.)	Takeo Kimi (Note: Resigned 27 March 1974) (LDP)
Zentaro Sugiyama (Social Democratic)	Takashi Sato (LDP)	1974	Shiro Watari (Note: Died in office 4 April 1977) (LDP)	Yutaka Shitoma (Note: Resigned 15 May 1989) (Social Democratic)
Zentaro Sugiyama (Social Democratic)	Jūichiro Tsukada (LDP)	(Note: Held 12 December 1976)1976 by-election	Shiro Watari (LDP)	Yutaka Shitoma (Social Democratic)
Zentaro Sugiyama (Social Democratic)	Jūichiro Tsukada (LDP)	(Note: Held 22 May 1977)1977 by-election	Shin Hasegawa (Note: Died in office 28 October 1990) (LDP)	Yutaka Shitoma (Social Democratic)
Masao Yoshida (Social Democratic)	Jūichiro Tsukada (LDP)	1977	Shin Hasegawa (LDP)	Yutaka Shitoma (Social Democratic)
Masao Yoshida (Social Democratic)	Jūichiro Tsukada (LDP)	1980	Shin Hasegawa (LDP)	Yutaka Shitoma (Social Democratic)
Toshio Inamura (Social Democratic)	Yoshio Yoshikawa (LDP)	1983	Shin Hasegawa (LDP)	Yutaka Shitoma (Social Democratic)
Toshio Inamura (Social Democratic)	Yoshio Yoshikawa (LDP)	1986	Shin Hasegawa (LDP)	Yutaka Shitoma (Social Democratic)
Toshio Inamura (Social Democratic)	Yoshio Yoshikawa (LDP)	(Note: Held 25 June 1989)1989 by-election	Shin Hasegawa (LDP)	Kinuko Ōfuchi (Social Democratic)
Toshio Inamura (Social Democratic)	Yoshio Yoshikawa (LDP)	1989	Shin Hasegawa (LDP)	Kinuko Ōfuchi (Social Democratic)
Toshio Inamura (Social Democratic)	Yoshio Yoshikawa (LDP)	(Note: Held 9 December 1990)1990 by-election	Kazuo Majima (LDP)	Kinuko Ōfuchi (Social Democratic)
Toshio Inamura (Social Democratic)	Yoshio Yoshikawa (LDP)	1992	Kazuo Majima (LDP)	Kinuko Ōfuchi (Social Democratic)
Michio Hasegawa (New Frontier)	Yoshio Yoshikawa (LDP)	1995	Kazuo Majima (LDP)	Kinuko Ōfuchi (Social Democratic)
Michio Hasegawa (New Frontier)	Yoshio Yoshikawa (LDP)	1998	Naoki Tanaka (LDP) (Note: Was first elected as an independent in 1998 but joined the LDP soon after. Resigned from the LDP in 2008 and joined the DPJ in 2009.)	Kinuko Ōfuchi (Social Democratic)
Yuko Mori (Liberal) (Note: The Liberal Party merged with the DPJ in 2003.)	Kazuo Majima (Note: Died in office 22 November 2001) (LDP)	2001	Naoki Tanaka (LDP)	Kinuko Ōfuchi (Social Democratic)
Yuko Mori (Liberal)	Takahiro Kuroiwa (Ind.) (Note: Joined the DPJ in December 2005))	2002 by-election (Note: Held 28 April 2002)	Naoki Tanaka (LDP)	Kinuko Ōfuchi (Social Democratic)
Yuko Mori (Liberal)	Takahiro Kuroiwa (Ind.)	2004	Naoki Tanaka (LDP)	Masamichi Kondo (Ind.) (Note: Joined the Social Democratic Party after his election.)
Yuko Mori (DPJ)	Ichiro Tsukada (LDP)	2007	Naoki Tanaka (LDP)	Masamichi Kondo (Ind.)
Yuko Mori (DPJ)	Ichiro Tsukada (LDP)	2010	Naoki Tanaka (DPJ)	Yaichi Nakahara (LDP)
Naoki Kazama (DPJ→DP→CDP)	Ichiro Tsukada (LDP)	2013	Naoki Tanaka (DPJ)	Yaichi Nakahara (LDP)
Naoki Kazama (DPJ→DP→CDP)	Ichiro Tsukada (LDP)	2016	Yuko Mori (Liberal) (Note: Rejoined the Liberal Party after her election.)	
Sakura Uchikoshi (CDP)		2019	Yuko Mori (Liberal)	
Sakura Uchikoshi (CDP)		2022	Kazuhiro Kobayashi (LDP)	

== Election results ==
2025
Party	Candidate	Votes	%	±%
CDP	Sakura Uchikoshi (Incumbent)	438,592	40.2	
LDP	Mai Nakamura	428,167	39.2	
Sanseitō	Eriko Hirai	207,786	19.0	
Anti-NHK	Kininari Harada	16,604	1.5	
Turnout			61.67	

2022
Party	Candidate	Votes	%	±%
LDP	Kazuhiro Kobayashi	517,581	51.0	
CDP	Yūko Mori (Incumbent)	448,651	44.2	
Sanseitō	Hiroki Endō	32,500	3.2	
Anti-NHK	Hiroyuki Ochi	17,098	1.7	
Turnout			55.32	

2019
Party	Candidate	Votes	%	±%
CDP	Sakura Uchikoshi	521,717	50.49	
LDP	Ichiro Tsukada (Incumbent)	479,050	46.36	
Anti-NHK	Tadafumi Kojima	32,628	3.2	
Turnout			55.31	

2016
Party	Candidate	Votes	%	±%
Independent	Yuko Mori	560,429	49.02	
LDP	Yaichi Nakahara (Incumbent)	558,150	48.82	
Happiness Realization	Motoyuki Yokoi	24,639	2.16	
Turnout			59.77	▲3.99

2013
Party	Candidate	Votes	%	±%
LDP	Ichiro Tsukada (Incumbent) (endorsed by Komeito)	456,542	43.0	
Democratic	Naoki Kazama	204,834	19.3	
People's Life	Yuko Mori (Incumbent)	165,308	15.6	
Restoration	Ryūichi Yoneyama	107,591	10.1	
JCP	Hiroshi Nishizawa	60,317	5.7	
Social Democratic	Hideaki Watanabe	46,101	4.3	
Independent	Miyoko Ankyu	15,612	1.5	
Happiness Realization	Hiroaki Ogose	5,188	0.5	
Turnout				

2010
Party	Candidate	Votes	%	±%
Democratic	Naoki Tanaka (Incumbent)	439,289	37.9	
LDP	Yaichi Nakahara	412,217	35.5	
Independent	Masamichi Kondo (Incumbent) (Endorsed by People's New Party and Social Democratic Party)	200,182	17.2	
JCP	Katsutoshi Takeda	73,579	6.3	
Independent	Satoshi Annaka	24,300	2.1	
Happiness Realization	Kenya Kasamaki	10,987	0.9	
Turnout				

2007
Party	Candidate	Votes	%	±%
LDP	Ichiro Tsukada (endorsed by Komeito)	403,497	32.1	
Democratic	Yuko Mori (Incumbent) (endorsed by People's New Party)	355,901	28.3	
Democratic	Takahiro Kuroiwa (Incumbent)	344,424	27.4	
Social Democratic	Akiko Yamamoto	91,016	7.2	
JCP	Katsutoshi Takeda	54,537	4.3	
Independent	Mitsumasa Kusuhara	7,806	0.6	
Turnout				

2004
Party	Candidate	Votes	%	±%
Independent	Masamichi Kondo (endorsed by Democratic Party and Social Democratic Party)	428,117	34.9	
LDP	Naoki Tanaka (Incumbent) (endorsed by Komeito)	367,059	29.9	
LDP	Ichiro Tsukada (endorsed by Komeito)	319,968	26.1	
JCP	Kayoko Kuwahara	111,201	9.1	
Turnout				

April 2002 By-election
Party	Candidate	Votes	%	±%
Independent	Takahiro Kuroiwa	541,881	53.3	
LDP	Ichiro Tsukada	342,207	33.7	
JCP	Kayoko Kuwahara	132,672	13.0	
Turnout			52.44%	

== See also ==
- List of districts of the House of Councillors of Japan
