= Nezu Museum =

- 根津美術館
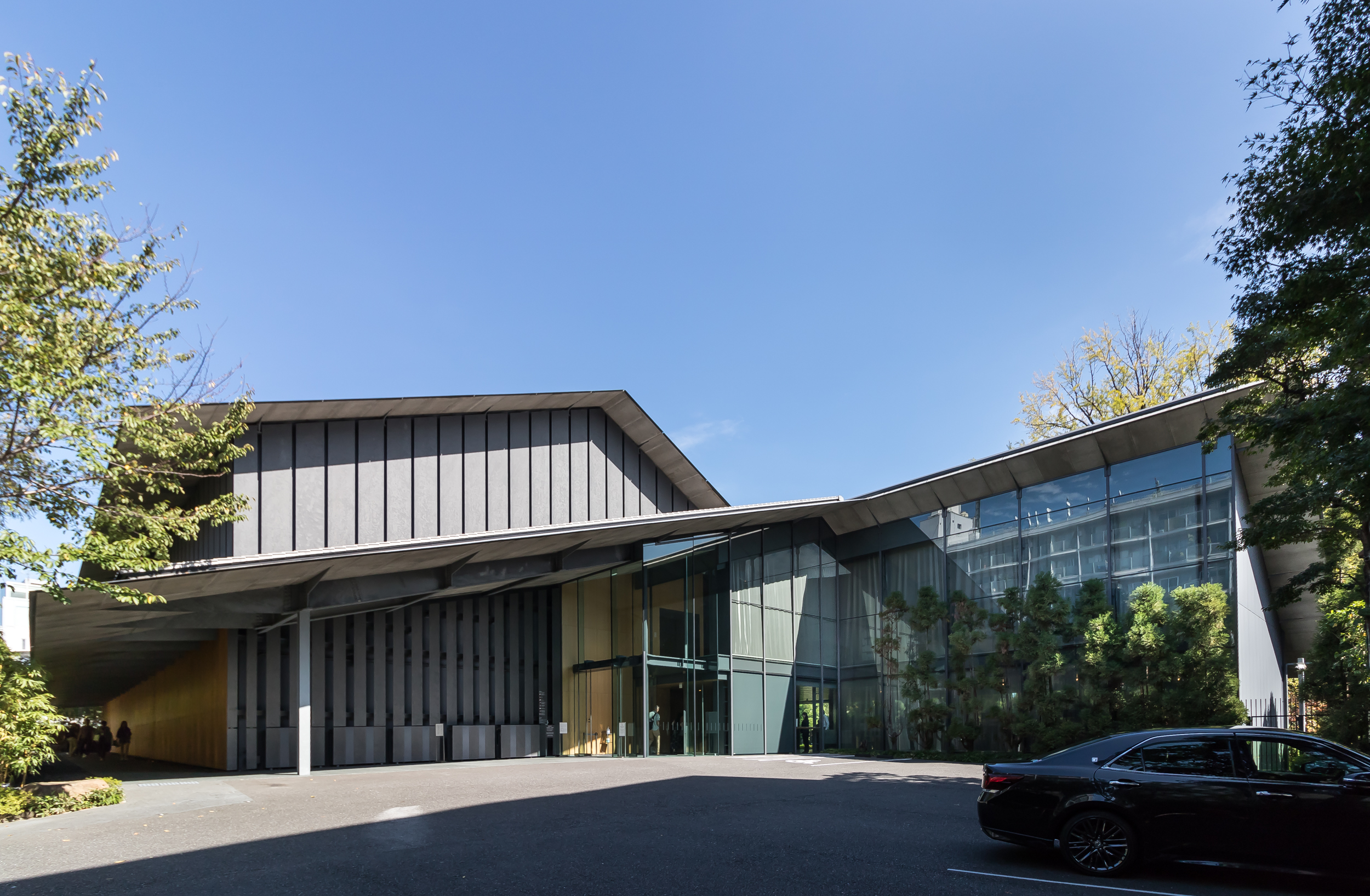
- Nezu Museum entrance

- Location of The Nezu Museum in Tokyo, Japan Nezu Museum (Tokyo wards area)
- Established: 1940
- Location: 6-5-1 Minami-Aoyama, Minato-ku, Tokyo, 107-0062, Japan
- Coordinates: 3166-2 35.66215°N 139.71703°E
- Type: Art museum
- Owner: Nezu Museum Foundation
- Website: http://www.nezu-muse.or.jp/en

The Nezu Museum (根津美術館, Nezu bijutsukan), formerly known as the Nezu Institute of Fine Arts, is an art museum in the Minato district of Tokyo, Japan.

The museum is home to the private collection of pre-modern Japanese and East Asian art assembled by Nezu Kaichirō (1860–1940). Established upon Nezu's death in 1940, the museum foundation began opening exhibitions to the public in 1941. During World War II, the museum's collection was safeguarded away from central Tokyo, avoiding the destruction suffered by the estate property during the bombing in May 1945. Exhibitions resumed after the war in 1946.

Closed due to large-scale renovation and renewal starting in 2006, the museum reopened in the fall of 2009 with a brand new building designed by the Japanese architect Kengo Kuma. The museum is also famous for its garden.

Drinking yuzu tea in the museum's cafe has been included as one of the best 30 Tokyo experiences in the Soul of Tokyo, a 2019 travel guide book.

== Collections ==
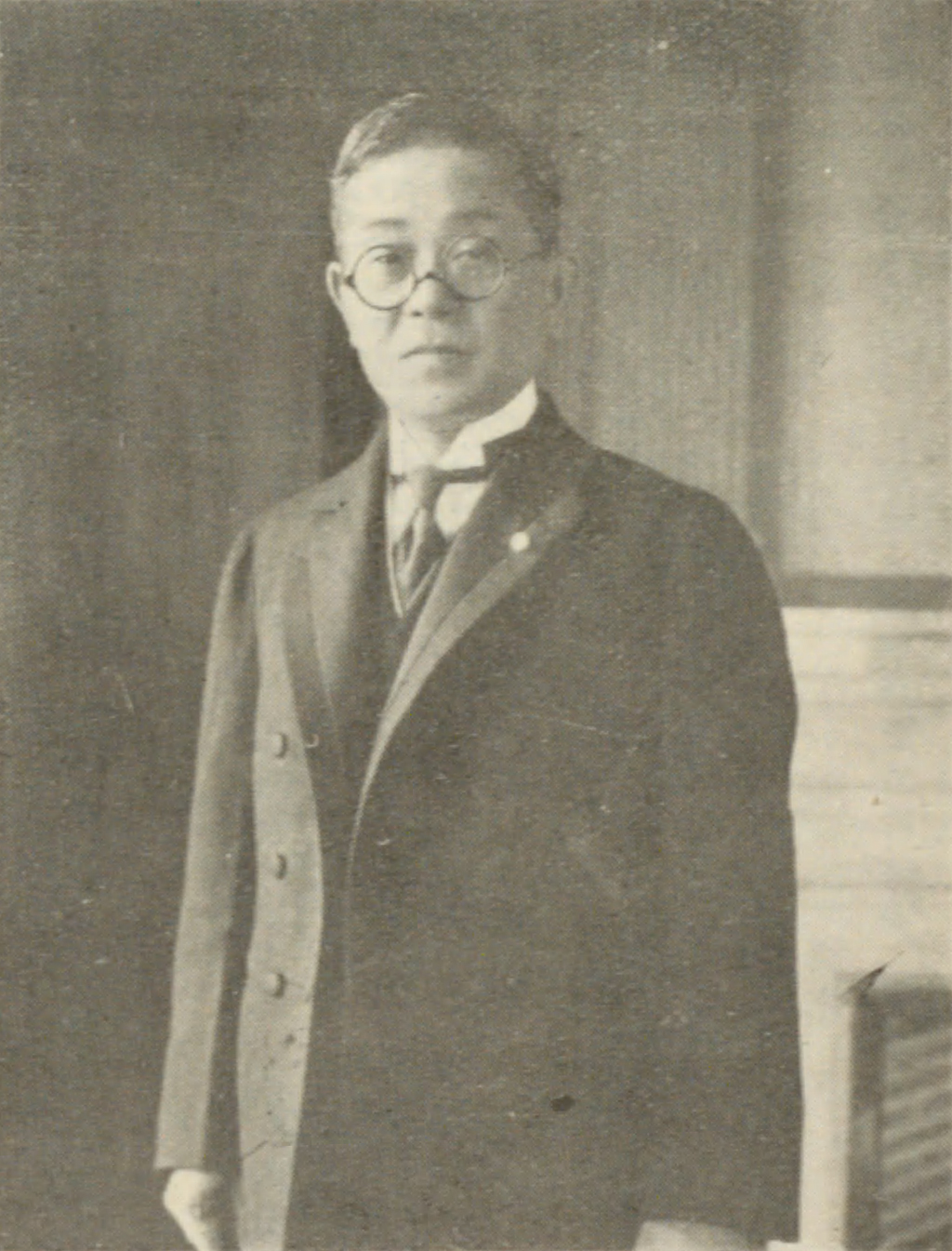
Nezu Kaichirō (1860–1940)

The museum houses more than 7,400 cultural objects, seven of which have been designated by the Japanese government as National Treasures, 88 as Important Cultural Properties, and 94 as Important Art Objects (ja). The museum's collection of cultural artifacts covers a variety of disciplines, including painting, calligraphy, sculpture, metalwork, ceramics, lacquerware, wooden and bamboo craft, textiles, armor, and archaeological artifacts.

Of the collection, the museum considers the byōbu (folding screen) Irises by Ogata Kōrin, designated as a National Treasure, to be the centerpiece of the collection. This byōbu is displayed for a limited time each year during a special exhibition from April to May to coincide with the blooming season of the irises planted in the museum's Japanese garden. Kaichirō Nezu acquired this byōbu in 1914, and even before the museum was founded, he held exhibitions and tea ceremonies to display it for the enjoyment of his many guests.

The museum's collection also includes 1,200 of the 3,000 pieces of Japanese sword fittings collected by Meiji era industrialist Mitsumura Toshimo (1877－1955), making it one of the largest collections of Japanese sword fittings in Japan. The collection also consists of Chinese bronzes of the Shang and Zhou dynasties.

In 2025, it was announced that a bell in the museum's collection had been taken from Korea during the Japanese colonial period. South Korean officials expressed interest in acquiring the bell and restoring it to the original government office in Jeju Province that it had been taken from. The museum declined to comment on the bell.

== Gallery ==
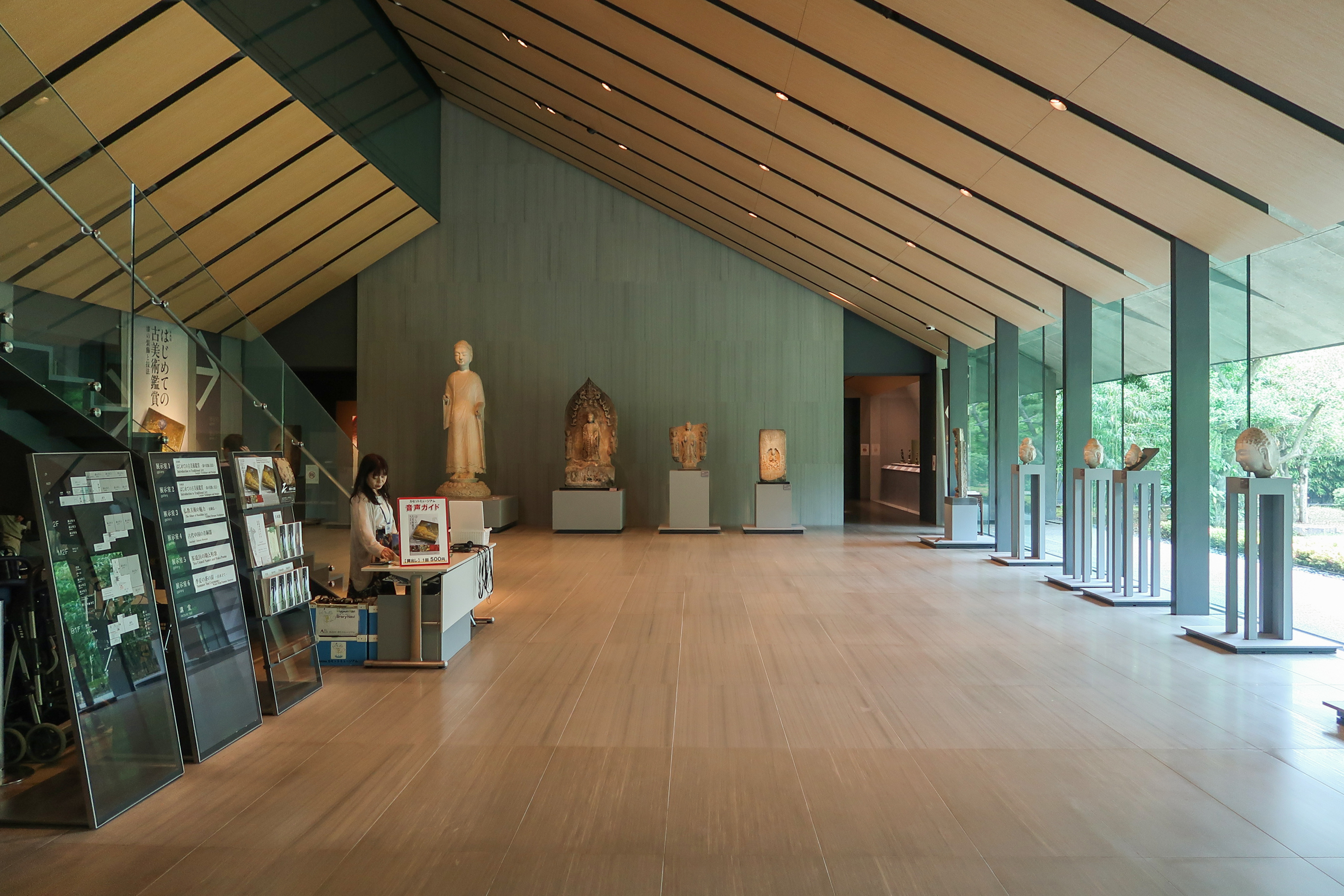
Interior of the museum

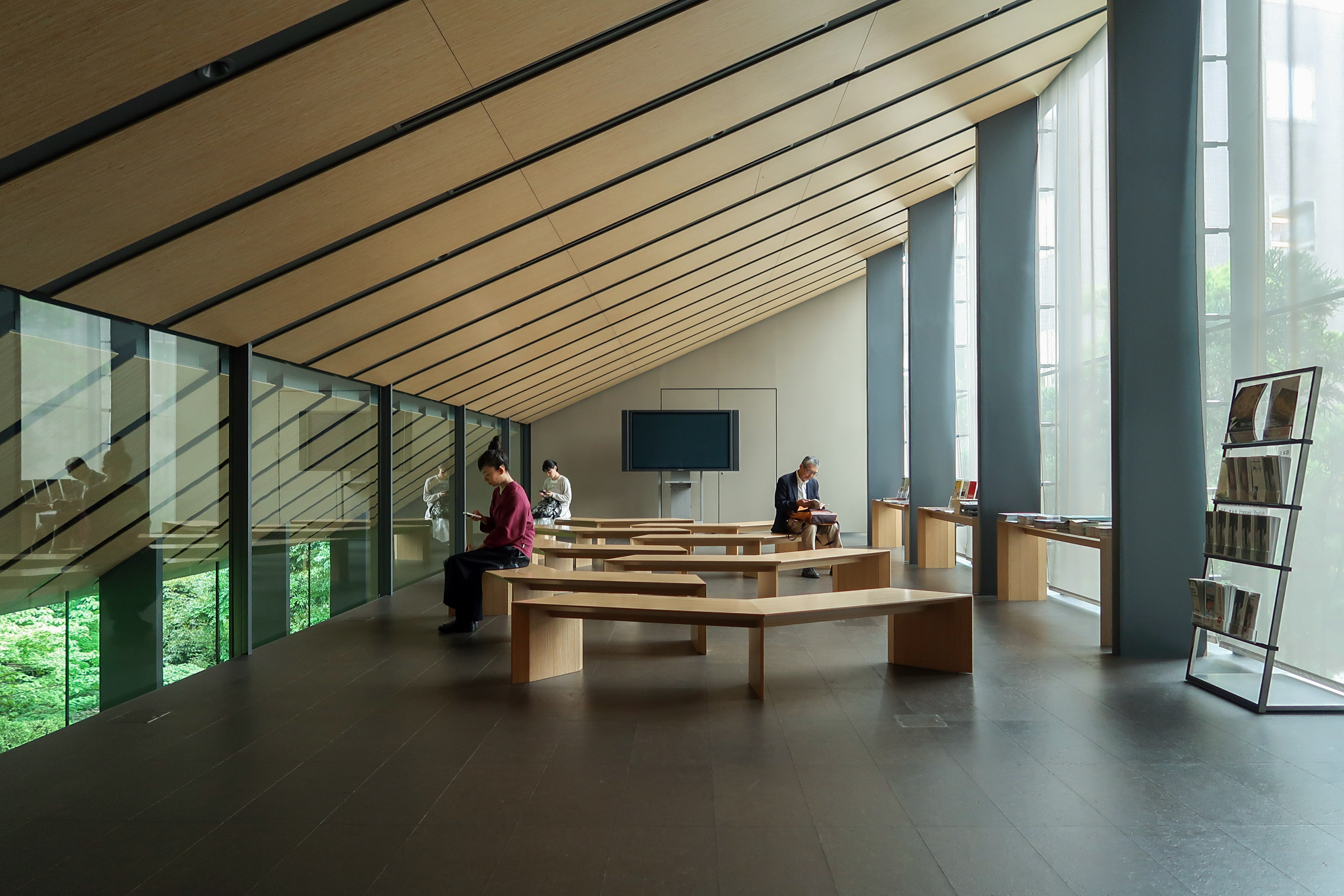
Interior of the museum

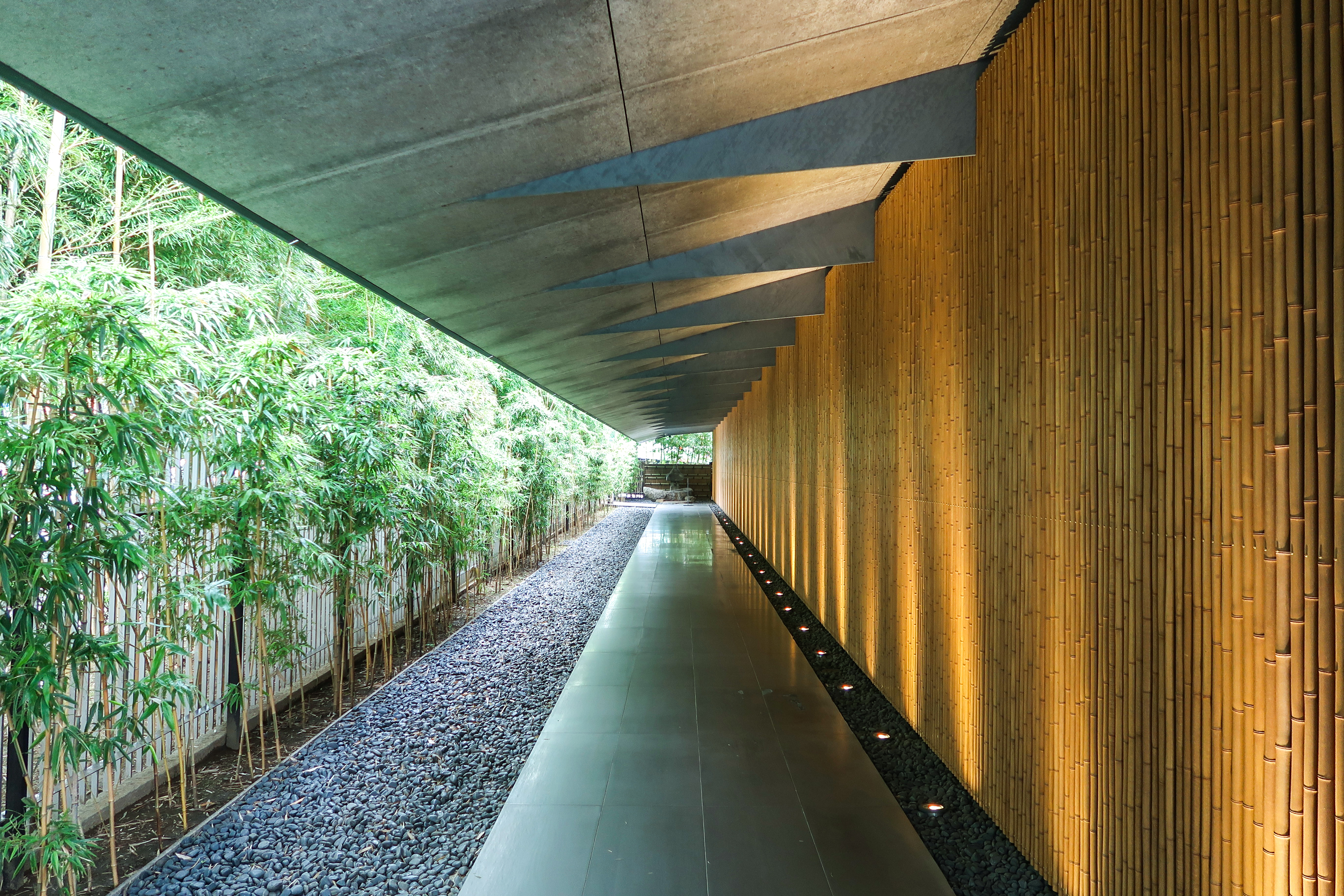
Outside access

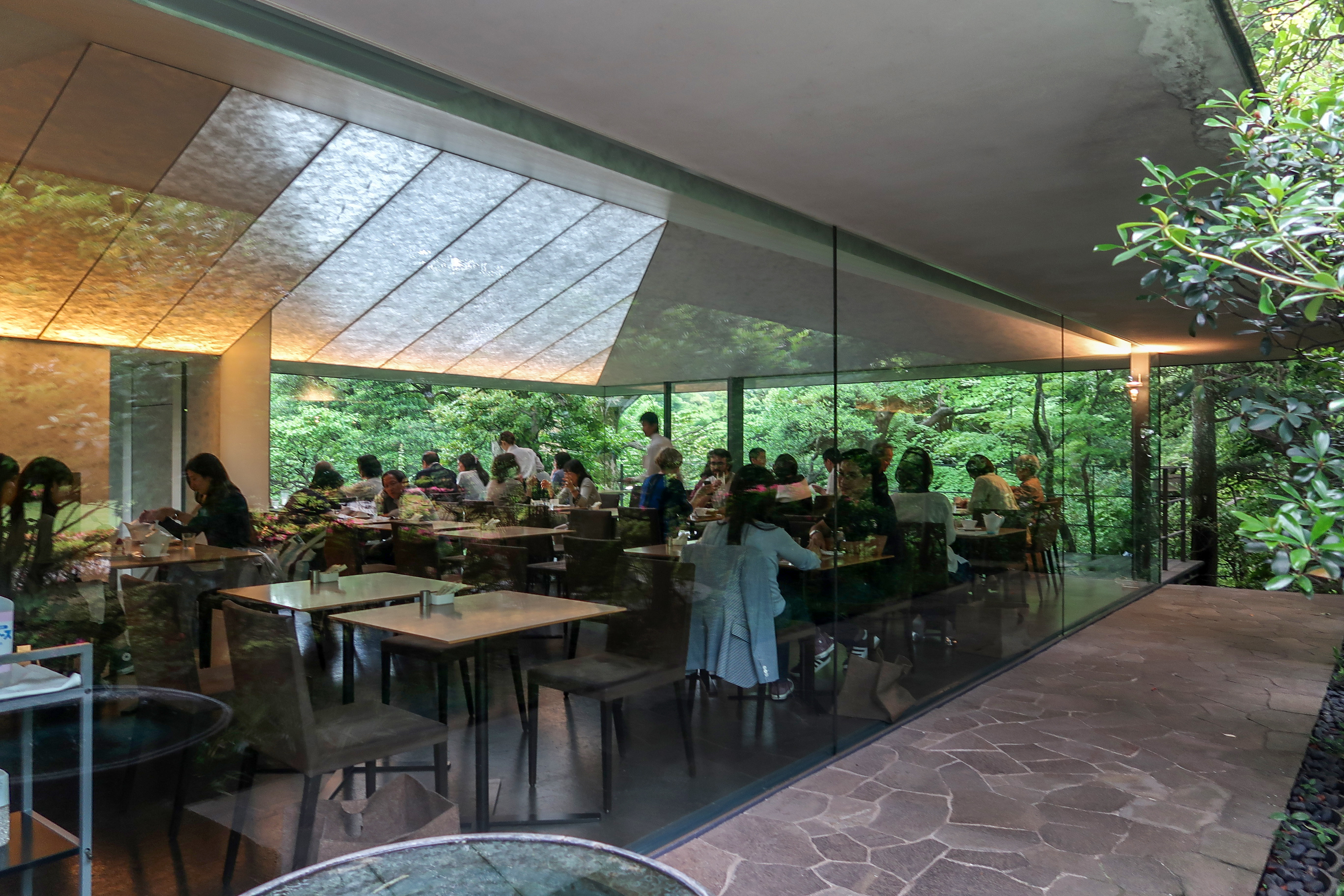
Nezu Cafe

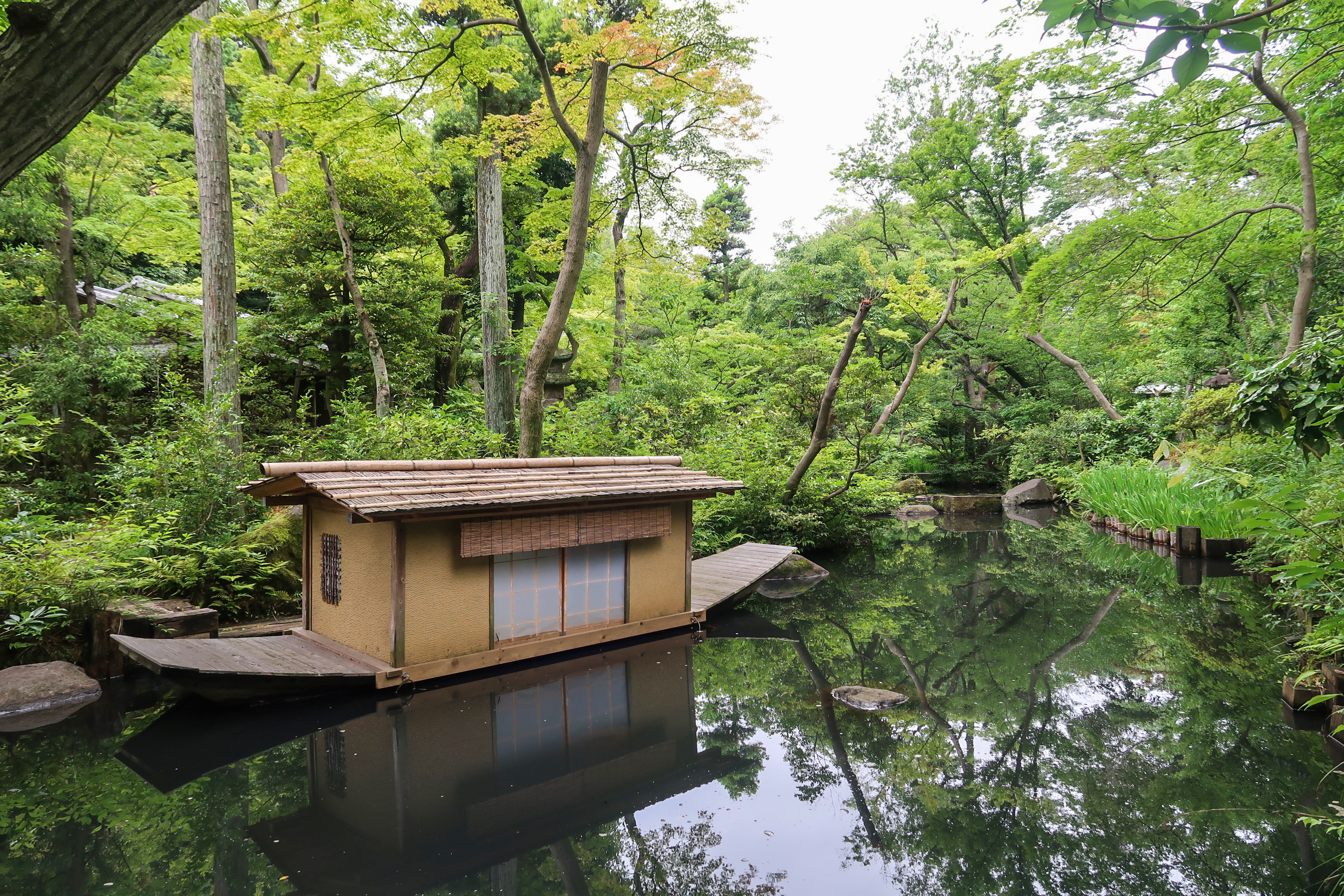
Garden pond

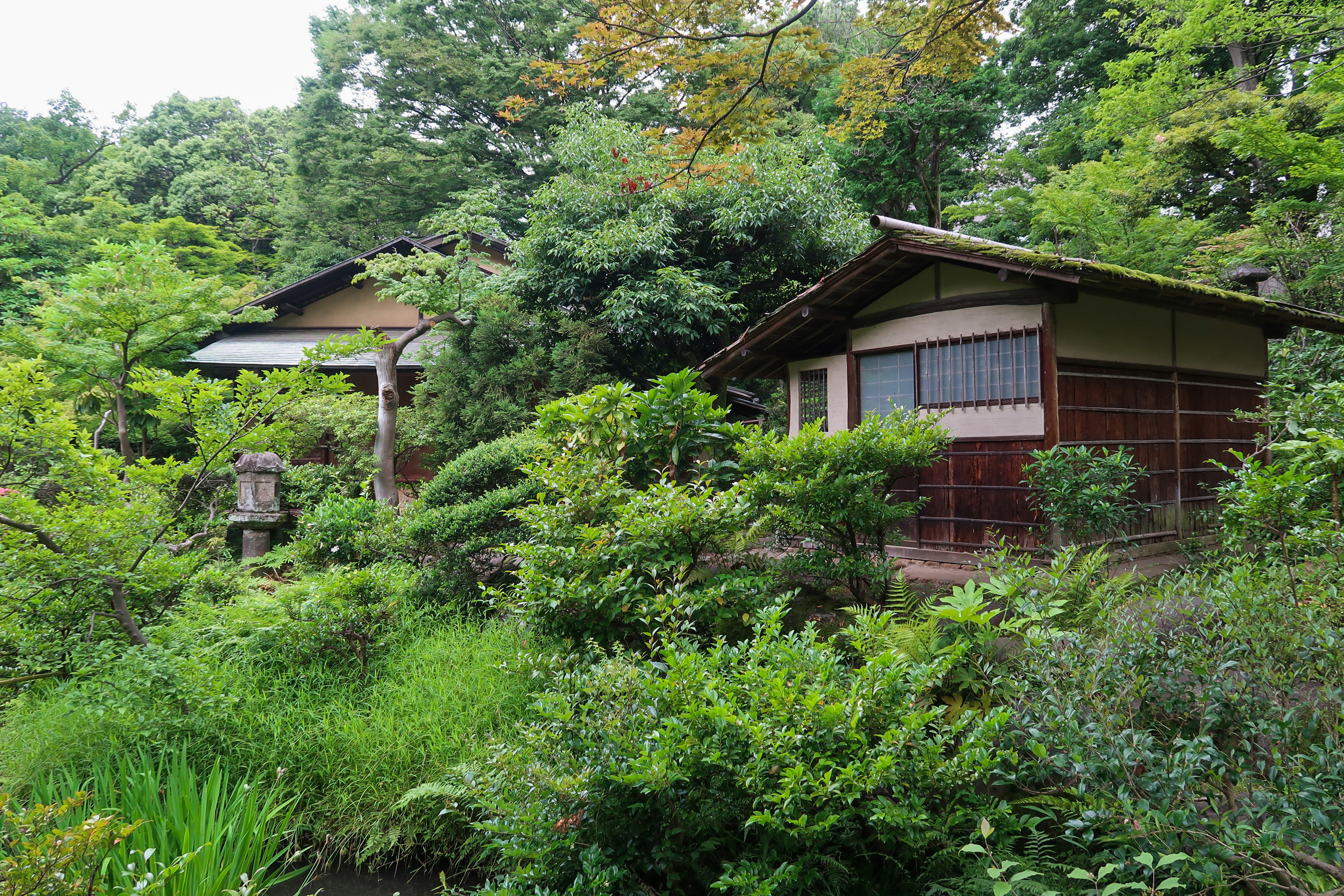
Garden hut
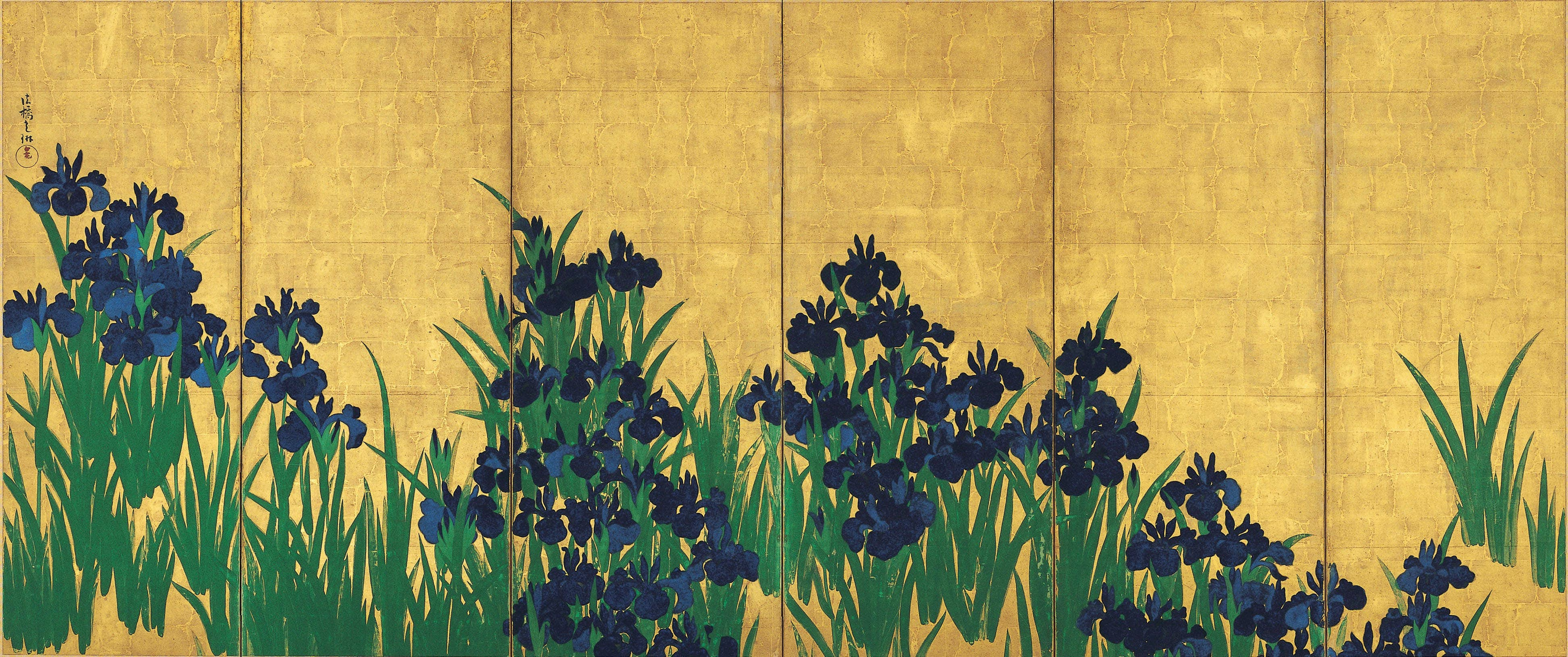
Irises by Ogata Kōrin (left panel), National Treasure

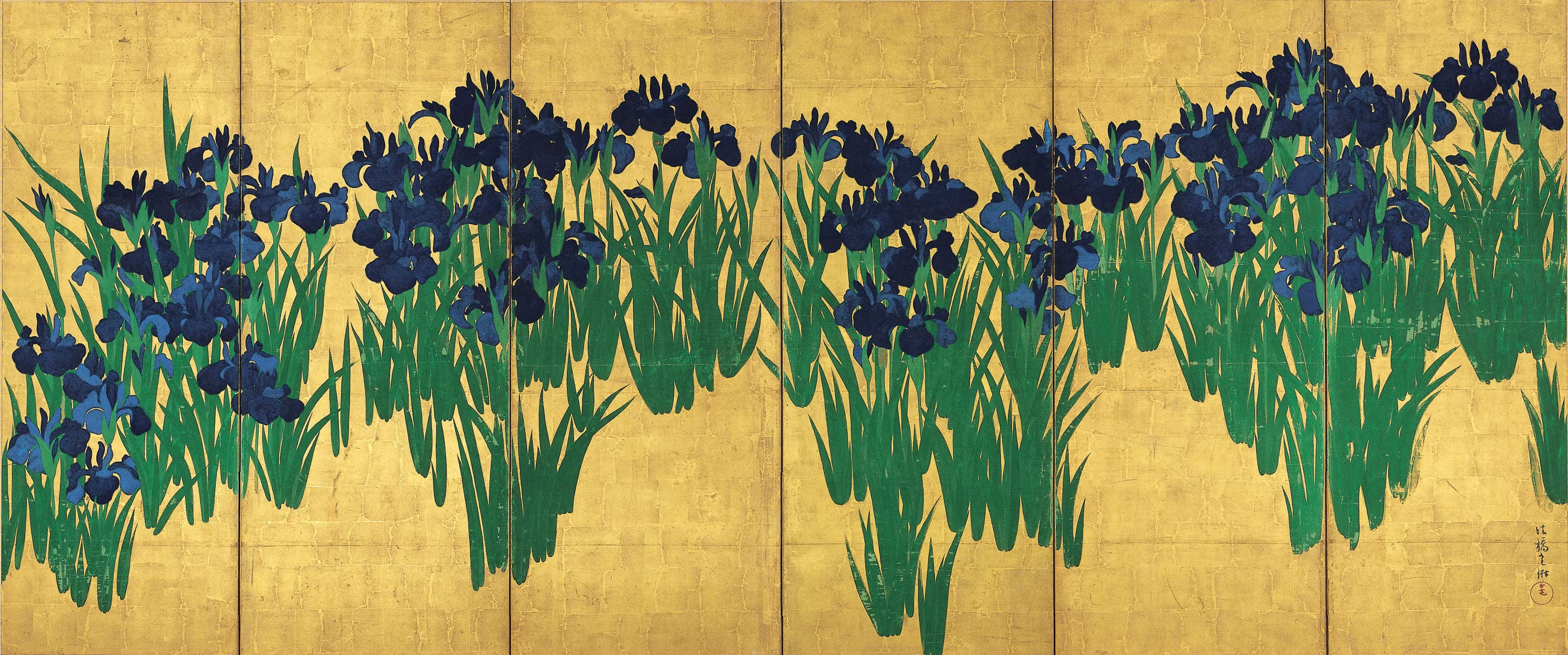
Irises by Ogata Kōrin (right panel), National Treasure

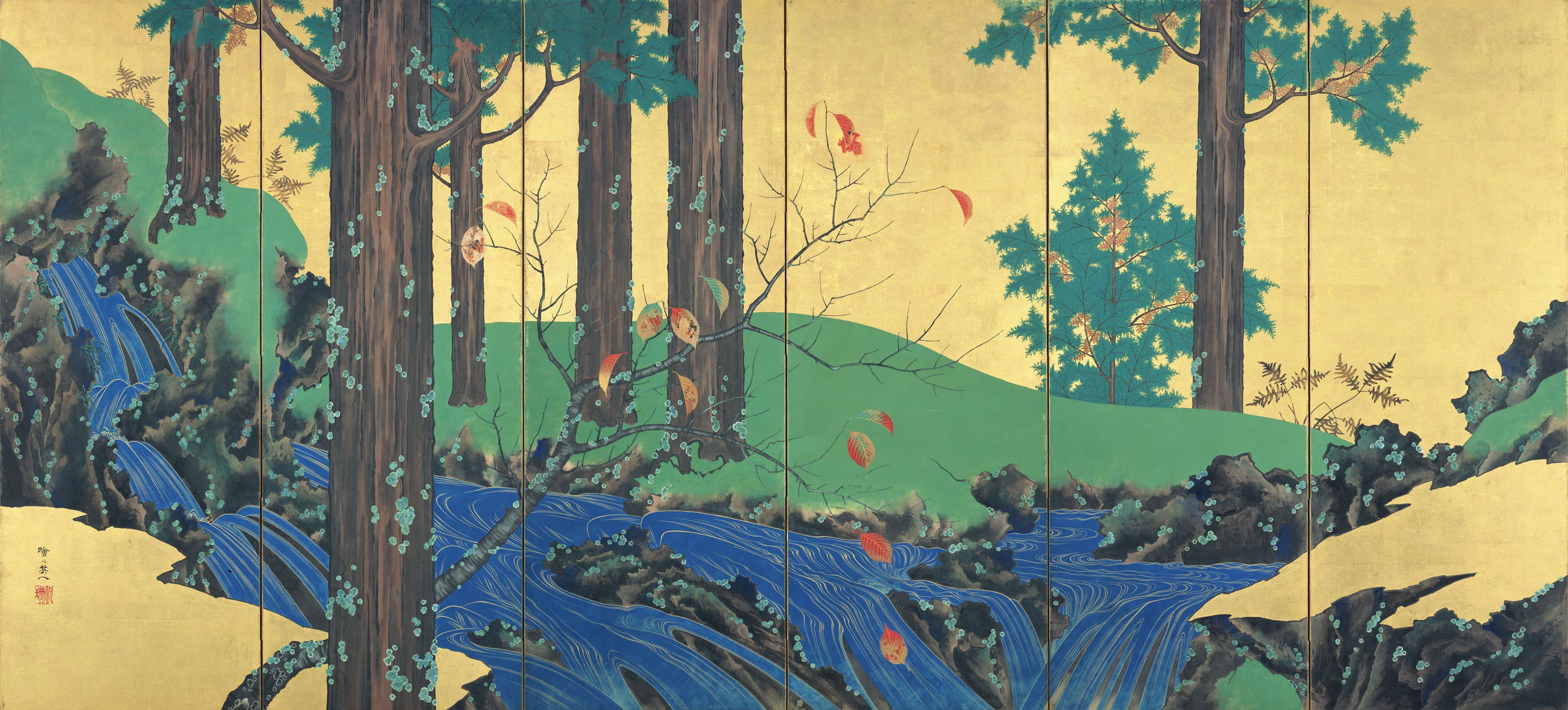
Mountain Stream in Summer and Autumn by Suzuki Kiitsu (left panel), Important Cultural Property

Mountain Stream in Summer and Autumn by Suzuki Kiitsu (right panel), Important Cultural Property

== Publications ==
The museum has published a number of books about its collection and special exhibitions, including the following:

- Selected Masterpieces from the Nezu Collection (2009)
- Kasuga Landscapes: Elegant Images of a Sacred Sanctuary (2011)
- Irises and Eight Bridges: Masterpieces by Kōrin from the Nezu Museum and the Metropolitan Museum of Art (2012)
- Rinpa Collection (2013)
- Ido Tea Bowls: Treasured Possessions of Muromachi Daimyo (2013)
- Transforming Masterpieces: A Collector’s Love Seen In Art (2014)
- The Double-ram Zun: World Renowned Chinese Bronzes from the Nezu Museum and the British Museum (2015)
- Preserving Heritage: The Nezu Collection (2015)
- Irises and Red and White Plum Blossoms: Secret of Kōrin’s Design (2015)
- The Fragrant Sublime: Koryo Buddhist Paintings (2016)
- Maruyama Ōkyo: Opening Up New Terrain in Japanese Painting (2016)
- Ko-imari: A Catalogue of Hizen Porcelain from the Nezu Museum’s Yamamoto Collection (2017)
- Kōrin and Kenzan: Brother Artists, Resonating Aesthetics (2018)
- Momoyama Tea Utensils: A New View (2018)
- Masterpieces from the Nezu Collection, New Edition: National Treasure and Important Cultural Property (2020)
- Fusuma Paintings in the Shoguns’ Residence (2022)
- Masterpieces from the Nezu Collection, New Edition: Calligraphy (2022)
- Masterpieces from the Nezu Collection, New Edition: The Art of Tea Utensils (2022)
- Masterpieces from the Nezu Collection, New Edition: Lacquerware (2022)
- Masterpieces from the Nezu Collection, New Edition: Textiles and Noh Masks (2023)
- Masterpieces from the Nezu Collection, New Edition: Early Modern Painting (2023)
- Masterpieces of Northern Song Painting and Calligraphy (2023)
- Masterpieces from the Nezu Collection, New Edition: Buddhist painting (2024)
- Masterpieces from the Nezu Collection, New Edition: Archeological Artifacts (2024)
- The Way of Tea in Katagiri Sekishu Style: An Authentic Samurai Tradition (2025)
- Masterpieces from the Nezu Collection, New Edition: Chinese Painting and Medieval Painting (2025)

Nezu Museum also publishes Shikun, which is a yearly bulletin for the publication of research papers by the museum’s curators.

== See also ==
- List of National Treasures of Japan (paintings)
- List of National Treasures of Japan (writings)
