= Nezu Kaichirō =

Japanese politician, businessperson (1860–1940)

- 根津 嘉一郎
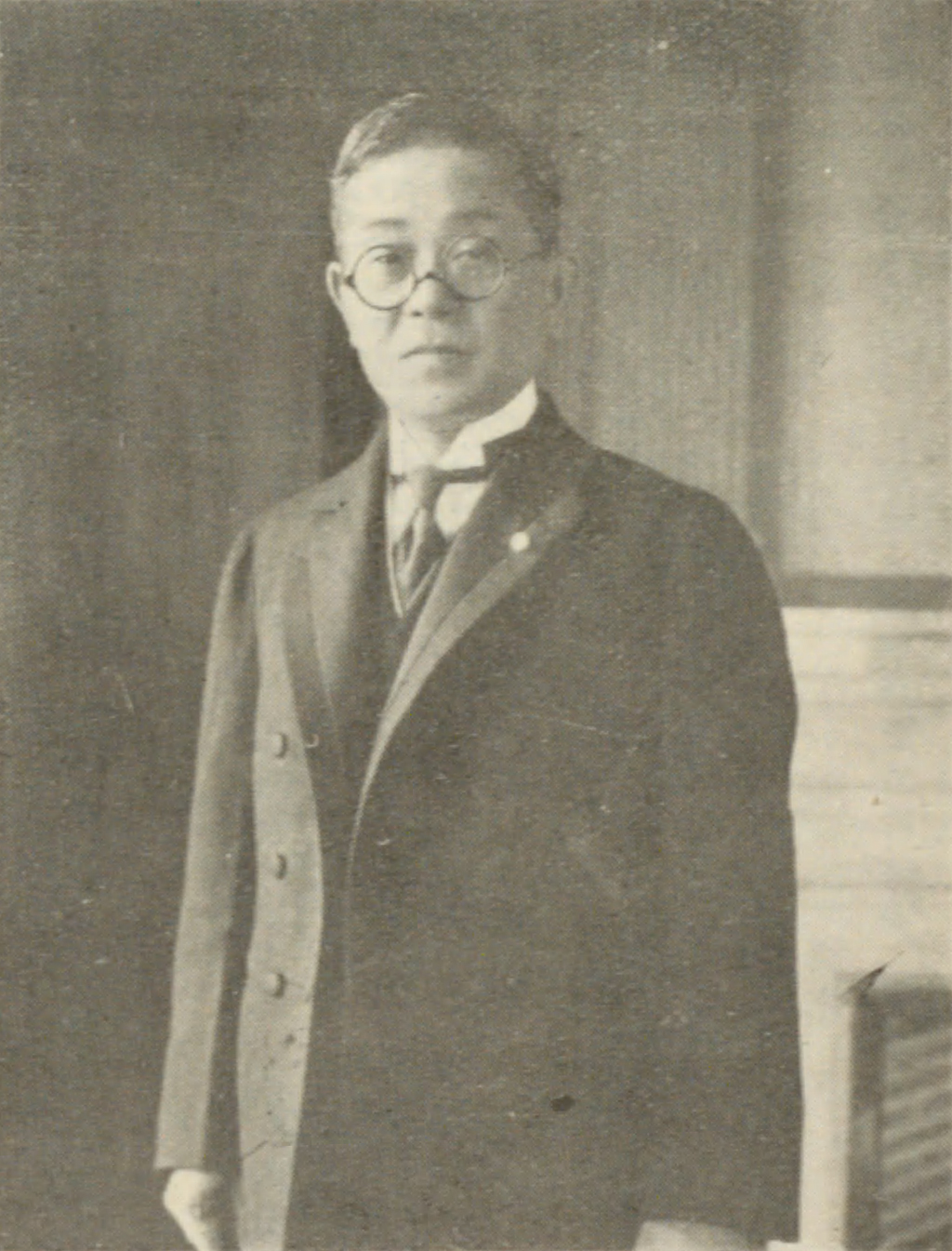
- Nezu Kaichirō
- Born: August 1, 1860; Yamanashi, Yamanashi Prefecture, Japan
- Died: January 4, 1940 (aged 79); Tokyo, Japan

Nezu Kaichirō (根津 嘉一郎; August 8, 1860 – January 4, 1940) was a Japanese businessman, national politician and philanthropist.

== Early life and career ==
Born into an established merchant family in Yamanashi, Yamanashi Prefecture, he moved to Tokyo in 1897, and became independently wealthy through stock investments.

Nezu was elected as a member of the House of Representatives in the National Diet in 1904 and won three subsequent reelections. He was elevated to the House of Peers in 1926.

In 1905 Nezu became President of Tobu Railway and successfully helped to grow the company to one of the largest private rail operators in the Kanto region. Other business interests included managerial and shareholding roles in Tokyo Basha Tetsudo (Tokyo Horse-Drawn Carriage Railways), Tokyo Dento (Tokyo electric Light Company) and in Tokyo Gas.

== Philanthropy ==
Accompanying Shibusawa Eiichi on a trade mission to the United States in 1909, Nezu was inspired by American industrialists' enthusiasm for civic and philanthropic activities. On his return to Japan Nezu founded and donated to a number of new educational and cultural initiatives including Musashi Junior and Senior High School.

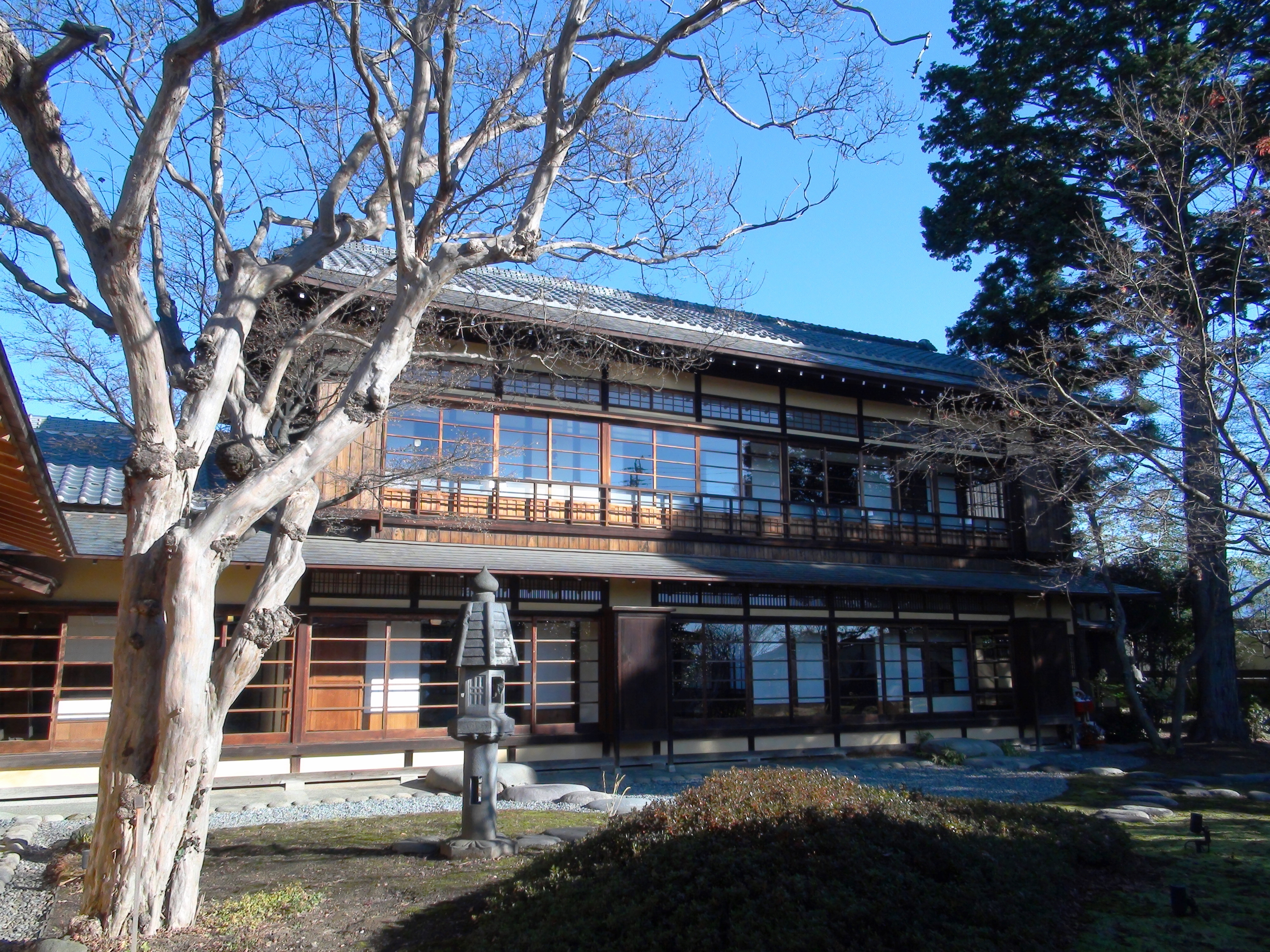
Nezu Memorial Museum, Yamanashi

Nezu was a keen practitioner of the Japanese tea ceremony and his extensive private collection of pre-modern Japanese and East Asian art, served as the basis for the Nezu Museum in Minato, Tokyo. The museum buildings were rebuilt in 2006 to modern design by Japanese architect Kengo Kuma, but the gardens of the museum also retain multiple traditional Chashitsu structures for tea ceremony gatherings.

Constructed in 1933, Nezu's family home in Yamanashi has been preserved as the Nezu Memorial Museum. The main house, gate house and three story Kura (storehouse), were listed as registered tangible cultural properties in 2007.
