= Chinami Nishimura (politician) =

Japanese politician (b. 1967)

- 西村 智奈美
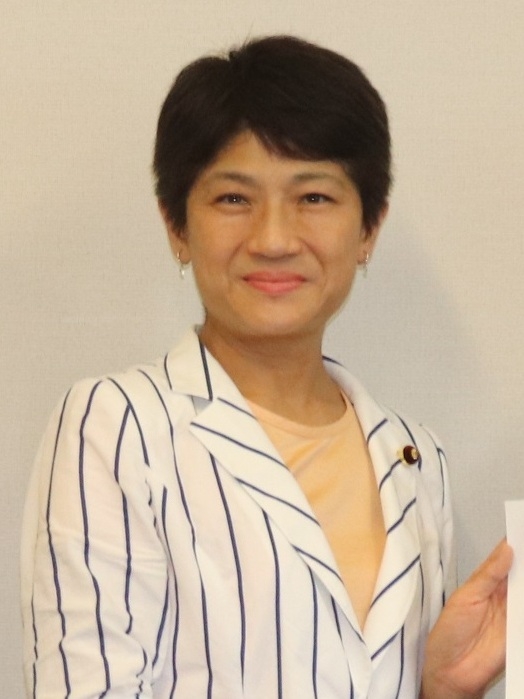
- Nishimura in 2023

Member of the House of Representatives; from Hokuriku-Shin'etsu
- Incumbent
- Assumed office 15 December 2014
- Preceded by: Multi-member district
- Constituency: PR block (2014–2017); Niigata 1st (2017–2026); PR block (2026–present)
- In office 10 November 2003 – 16 November 2012
- Preceded by: Rokuzaemon Yoshida
- Succeeded by: Tōru Ishizaki
- Constituency: Niigata 1st

Member of the Niigata Prefectural Assembly
- In office 30 April 1999 – 29 April 2003
- Constituency: Niigata City

Personal details
- Born: 13 January 1967 (age 59) Yoshida, Niigata, Japan
- Party: DRP (since 2026)
- Other political affiliations: DPJ (1999–2016); DP (2016–2017); CDP (2017–2026); CRA (2026)
- Spouse: Hiranao Honda
- Children: 1
- Education: Niigata University; Bristol University
- Website: Official website

Chinami Nishimura (西村 智奈美, Nishimura Chinami; born 13 January 1967) is a Japanese politician who served as the Secretary-General of the Constitutional Democratic Party of Japan from 2021 to 2022. She is a member of the House of Representatives in the Diet and represents the Niigata 1st district. Her married name is Chinami Honda (本多 智奈美, Honda Chinami).

== Biography ==
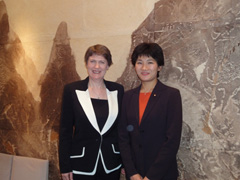
With Helen Clark (24 November 2009)

A native of Tsubame, Niigata she attended Niigata University (as both undergraduate and graduate), a language school in Bangkok, Thailand, and University of Bristol in England. She was elected to the assembly of Niigata Prefecture for the first time in 1999 and to the Diet for the first time in 2003.

She served as a Vice Health Minister in the Noda administration and as a Parliamentary Secretary of the Foreign Minister in the Hatoyama administration.

She was appointed Secretary-General of the CDP in December 2021 following the 2021 general elections.

Her husband is former Representative Hiranao Honda from Hokkaido.
