= Results of the 2000 Japanese general election =

- 25 June 2000
- All 480 seats in the House of Representatives; 241 seats needed for a majority
| Party | Leader | Seats | +/– |
|---|---|---|---|
| LDP | Yoshirō Mori | 233 | −6 |
| Democratic | Yukio Hatoyama | 127 | +32 |
| New Kōmeitō | Takenori Kanzaki | 31 | New |
| Liberal | Ichirō Ozawa | 22 | New |
| JCP | Tetsuzo Fuwa | 20 | −6 |
| Social Democratic | Takako Doi | 19 | +4 |
| New Conservative | Chikage Oogi | 7 | New |
| Independent Association | Motoo Shiina | 5 | New |
| Liberal League | Takeshi Tokuda | 1 | New |
| Independents | – | 15 | +6 |
This lists parties that won seats. See the complete results below.
- Constituency seats
- All 300 seats
- Turnout: 62.49% (▲2.84pp)
| Party | Vote % | Seats | +/– |
|---|---|---|---|
| LDP | 40.97 | 177 | +8 |
| Democratic | 27.61 | 80 | +63 |
| New Kōmeitō | 2.02 | 7 | New |
| Liberal | 3.37 | 4 | New |
| JCP | 12.08 | 0 | −2 |
| Social Democratic | 3.80 | 4 | 0 |
| New Conservative | 2.02 | 7 | New |
| Independent Association | 1.07 | 5 | New |
| Liberal League | 1.76 | 1 | New |
| Independents | 4.87 | 15 | +6 |
This lists parties that won seats. See the complete results below.
- Proportional seats
- All 180 seats
- Turnout: 62.44% (▲2.82pp)
| Party | Vote % | Seats | +/– |
|---|---|---|---|
| LDP | 28.31 | 56 | −14 |
| Democratic | 25.18 | 47 | +12 |
| New Kōmeitō | 12.97 | 24 | New |
| JCP | 11.23 | 20 | −4 |
| Liberal | 11.01 | 18 | New |
| Social Democratic | 9.36 | 15 | +4 |
This lists parties that won seats. See the complete results below.
Results by constituency and PR seats, shaded according to vote strength
| Prime Minister before | Prime Minister after |
|---|---|
| Yoshirō Mori; LDP | Yoshirō Mori; LDP |

This article presents detailed results of the 2000 Japanese general election. The results are separated into each of the eleven proportional representation blocks and their corresponding prefectures. In the following tables, candidates elected via single-member district are highlighted in green, while candidates elected via proportional representation are highlighted in red.

== Electoral system ==
The House of Representatives is elected via parallel voting. In the 2000 election, 300 members were elected in single-member districts and 180 via party-list proportional representation in eleven multi-member constituencies, referred to as "PR blocks". Single-member districts are apportioned between prefectures and numbered (1st, 2nd, etc). Candidates may run solely in a single-member district, solely in PR, or both (dual listing). Dual listed candidates must win at least 10% of the vote in their single-member district in order to be eligible for election via PR. Dual listed candidates who win their single-member district race are not eligible for election via PR.

Candidates on PR lists may be ranked sequentially or, if they are dual listed, ranked equally with one another. If ranked equally, the best-loser ratio (sekihairitsu) of each candidate determines the order of election. This number is determined by dividing their single-member district votes by those of the winning candidate in that district. In this way, the losing candidates who performed best will be elected first.

If a party wins more PR seats than they have eligible candidates on their list, the unfilled seats will be distributed to other parties in accordance with the PR formula.

== Hokkaido block ==
2000 Japanese general election in Hokkaido
- 25 June 2000

All 21 seats to the House of Representatives
| | Majority party | Minority party | Third party |
|---|---|---|---|
| Party | LDP | DPJ | Komei |
| Last election | 9 seats | 8 seats | New |
| Constituency | 7 | 6 | 0 |
| PR seats | 2 | 3 | 1 |
| Total | 9 | 9 | 1 |
| Seat change | 0 | ▲1 | ▲1 |
| | Fourth party | Fifth party |
| Party | JCP | SDP |
| Last election | 1 seat | New |
| Constituency | 0 | 0 |
| PR seats | 1 | 1 |
| Total | 1 | 1 |
| Seat change | 0 | ▲1 |

Single-member constituency results in Hokkaido
| Constituency | Previous member | | Elected member | | Votes | % | Margin | Runner-up | | % | Status |
|---|---|---|---|---|---|---|---|---|---|---|---|
| Hokkaido 1st | Takahiro Yokomichi | DPJ | Takahiro Yokomichi | DPJ | 132,514 | 50.7 | 56,467 | Yoshitaka Kimoto | LDP | 29.1 | DPJ hold |
| Hokkaido 2nd | Junichi Osanai | Komei | Takamori Yoshikawa | LDP | 76,276 | 31.2 | 12,311 | Yukiko Ishida | DPJ | 26.1 | LDP gain from Komei |
| Hokkaido 3rd | Gaku Ishizaki | LDP | Satoshi Arai | DPJ | 96,653 | 40.5 | 5,959 | Gaku Ishizaki | LDP | 38.0 | DPJ gain from LDP |
| Hokkaido 4th | Shizuo Sato | LDP | Shizuo Sato | LDP | 88,825 | 42.9 | 7,020 | Ryuichi Ikeda | DPJ | 39.5 | LDP hold |
| Hokkaido 5th | Nobutaka Machimura | LDP | Nobutaka Machimura | LDP | 123,680 | 46.0 | 39,049 | Chiyomi Kobayashi | DPJ | 31.4 | LDP hold |
| Hokkaido 6th | Hidenori Sasaki | DPJ | Hidenori Sasaki | DPJ | 70,680 | 39.9 | 1,899 | Hiroshi Imazu | LDP | 38.9 | DPJ hold |
| Hokkaido 7th | Eiko Kaneta | LDP | Eiko Kaneta | LDP | 94,290 | 49.2 | 8,737 | Yasuki Sakuraba | DPJ | 44.6 | LDP hold |
| Hokkaido 8th | Yoshio Hachiro | DPJ | Yoshio Hachiro | DPJ | 123,638 | 47.3 | 12,087 | Kokou Sato | LDP | 42.7 | DPJ hold |
| Hokkaido 9th | Yukio Hatoyama | DPJ | Yukio Hatoyama | DPJ | 131,500 | 45.5 | 2,525 | Hirofumi Iwakura | LDP | 44.6 | DPJ hold |
| Hokkaido 10th | Tadamasa Kodaira | DPJ | Tadamasa Kodaira | DPJ | 106,221 | 48.2 | 19,025 | Takafumi Yamashita | LDP | 39.6 | DPJ hold |
| Hokkaido 11th | Shōichi Nakagawa | LDP | Shōichi Nakagawa | LDP | 112,297 | 57.7 | 54,811 | Motoko Ideta | DPJ | 29.6 | LDP hold |
| Hokkaido 12th | Tsutomu Takebe | LDP | Tsutomu Takebe | LDP | 100,502 | 53.2 | 26,339 | Tetsuo Nagai | DPJ | 39.3 | LDP hold |
| Hokkaido 13th | Naoto Kitamura | LDP | Naoto Kitamura | LDP | 86,567 | 46.9 | 30,835 | Hiroko Nakano | DPJ | 30.2 | LDP hold |

Proportional representation results
| Party | Votes | Seats | Rank | Elected member | Constituency | Ratio |
|---|---|---|---|---|---|---|
| DPJ | 898,678 (31.2%) | 3 | 1 | Kenji Nakazawa | | |
| DPJ | 898,678 (31.2%) | 3 | 2 | Seiichi Kaneta | | |
| DPJ | 898,678 (31.2%) | 3 | 3 | Wakio Mitsui | | |
| LDP | 735,318 (25.6%) | 2 | 1 | Muneo Suzuki | | |
| LDP | 735,318 (25.6%) | 2 | 2 | Hirofumi Iwakura | Hokkaido 9th | 98.0% |
| Komei | 368,198 (12.8%) | 1 | 1 | Kaori Maruya | | |
| JCP | 365,061 (12.7%) | 1 | 1 | Kenji Kodama | Hokkaido 3rd | 42.9% |
| SDP | 255,319 (8.9%) | 1 | 1 | Keiko Yamauchi | | |

== Tohoku block ==
2000 Japanese general election in Tohoku
- 25 June 2000

All 40 seats to the House of Representatives
| | Majority party | Minority party | Third party |
|---|---|---|---|
| Party | LDP | DPJ | LP |
| Last election | 21 seats | 3 seats | New |
| Constituency | 15 | 6 | 3 |
| PR seats | 5 | 3 | 3 |
| Total | 20 | 9 | 6 |
| Seat change | ▼1 | ▲6 | ▲6 |
| | Fourth party | Fifth party | Sixth party |
| Party | IA | SDP | Komei |
| Last election | New | 1 seat | New |
| Constituency | 2 | 0 | 0 |
| PR seats | 0 | 1 | 1 |
| Total | 2 | 1 | 1 |
| Seat change | ▲2 | 0 | ▲1 |
| | Seventh party |
| Party | JCP |
| Last election | 1 seat |
| Constituency | 0 |
| PR seats | 1 |
| Total | 1 |
| Seat change | 0 |

Single-member constituency results in Tohoku
| Constituency | Previous member | | Elected member | | Votes | % | Margin | Runner-up | | % | ! Status |
|---|---|---|---|---|---|---|---|---|---|---|---|
| Aomori 1st | Yūji Tsushima | LDP | Yūji Tsushima | LDP | 96,691 | 51.4 | 55,985 | Osami Imamura | SDP | 21.6 | LDP hold |
| Aomori 2nd | Akinori Eto | LDP | Shingo Mimura | IA | 80,338 | 46.9 | 6,220 | Akinori Eto | LDP | 43.3 | IA gain from LDP |
| Aomori 3rd | Tadamori Ōshima | LDP | Tadamori Ōshima | LDP | 93,602 | 56.6 | 29,399 | Masami Tanabu | DPJ | 38.8 | LDP hold |
| Aomori 4th | Tarō Kimura | LDP | Tarō Kimura | LDP | 126,056 | 69.0 | 89,702 | Makiko Tazawa | SDP | 19.9 | LDP hold |
| Iwate 1st | Takuya Tasso | LP | Takuya Tasso | LP | 74,835 | 43.0 | 9,238 | Tokuichiro Tamazawa | LDP | 37.7 | LP hold |
| Iwate 2nd | Shun'ichi Suzuki | LDP | Shun'ichi Suzuki | LDP | 119,022 | 58.7 | 65,279 | Kentaro Kudo | LP | 26.5 | LDP hold |
| Iwate 3rd | Yohei Sasaki | CP | Toru Kikawada | LP | 58,776 | 30.9 | 6,408 | Riki Nakamura | Ind. | 27.5 | LP gain from CP |
| Iwate 4th | Ichirō Ozawa | LP | Ichirō Ozawa | LP | 119,099 | 59.7 | 81,682 | Yukihiro Kimura | SDP | 18.8 | LP hold |
| Miyagi 1st | Kazuo Aichi | LDP | Azuma Konno | DPJ | 88,864 | 42.0 | 15,025 | Kazuo Aichi | LDP | 34.9 | DPJ gain from LDP |
| Miyagi 2nd | Masashi Nakano | LDP | Sayuri Kamata | DPJ | 99,498 | 47.8 | 11,549 | Masashi Nakano | LDP | 42.2 | DPJ gain from LDP |
| Miyagi 3rd | Hiroshi Mitsuzuka | LDP | Hiroshi Mitsuzuka | LDP | 84,278 | 52.0 | 43,382 | Katsuhiro Koyama | DPJ | 25.2 | LDP hold |
| Miyagi 4th | Soichiro Ito | LDP | Soichiro Ito | LDP | 104,711 | 57.5 | 54,738 | Yukino Sakunami | DPJ | 27.4 | LDP hold |
| Miyagi 5th | Jun Azumi | DPJ | Jun Azumi | DPJ | 69,459 | 47.2 | 1,222 | Kimio Doi | LDP | 46.4 | DPJ hold |
| Miyagi 6th | Masamitsu Oishi | DPJ | Masamitsu Oishi | DPJ | 59,588 | 37.7 | 14,959 | Kyuichiro Sato | LDP | 28.2 | DPJ hold |
| Akita 1st | Takao Sato | DPJ | Koji Futada | LDP | 101,848 | 44.0 | 535 | Takao Sato | DPJ | 43.8 | LDP gain from DPJ |
| Akita 2nd | Hosei Norota | LDP | Hosei Norota | LDP | 89,428 | 54.3 | 39,985 | Kenjiro Hatakeyama | SDP | 30.0 | LDP hold |
| Akita 3rd | Kanezo Muraoka | LDP | Kanezo Muraoka | LDP | 170,176 | 63.0 | 124,604 | Tatsuro Nakajima | DPJ | 16.9 | LDP hold |
| Yamagata 1st | Michihiko Kano | DPJ | Michihiko Kano | DPJ | 90,349 | 52.0 | 20,059 | Toshiaki Endo | LDP | 40.5 | DPJ hold |
| Yamagata 2nd | Takehiko Endo | LDP | Takehiko Endo | LDP | 93,819 | 51.3 | 16,328 | Yosuke Kondo | Ind. | 42.3 | LDP hold |
| Yamagata 3rd | Riichiro Chikaoka | LDP | Riichiro Chikaoka | LDP | 88,069 | 57.2 | 32,178 | Shosuke Saito | SDP | 36.3 | LDP hold |
| Yamagata 4th | Koichi Kato | LDP | Koichi Kato | LDP | 131,181 | 72.1 | 95,095 | Takayoshi Sagae | DPJ | 19.8 | LDP hold |
| Fukushima 1st | Tatsuo Sato | LDP | Tatsuo Sato | LDP | 89,353 | 30.2 | 20,478 | Yoshitami Kameoka | Ind. | 23.3 | LDP hold |
| Fukushima 2nd | Takumi Nemoto | LDP | Takumi Nemoto | LDP | 116,835 | 52.5 | 36,830 | Teruhiko Mashiko | DPJ | 35.9 | LDP hold |
| Fukushima 3rd | Hiroyuki Arai | LDP | Kōichirō Genba | DPJ | 118,385 | 53.8 | 27,304 | Yoshiyuki Hozumi | LDP | 41.4 | DPJ gain from LDP |
| Fukushima 4th | Kōzō Watanabe | IA | Kōzō Watanabe | IA | 102,631 | 50.7 | 14,130 | Hideo Yamauchi | LDP | 43.7 | IA hold |
| Fukushima 5th | Goji Sakamoto | LDP | Masayoshi Yoshino | LDP | 109,270 | 52.6 | 35,367 | Izumi Yoshida | DPJ | 35.6 | LDP hold |

Proportional representation results
| Party | Votes | Seats | Rank | Elected member | Constituency | Ratio |
|---|---|---|---|---|---|---|
| LDP | 1,545,028 (32.0%) | 5 | 1 | Hidefumi Minorikawa | | |
| LDP | 1,545,028 (32.0%) | 5 | 2 | Hiroyuki Arai | | |
| LDP | 1,545,028 (32.0%) | 5 | 3 | Koki Hagino | | |
| LDP | 1,545,028 (32.0%) | 5 | 4 | Goji Sakamoto | | |
| LDP | 1,545,028 (32.0%) | 5 | 5 | Ichio Kumagai | | |
| DPJ | 1,024,253 (21.2%) | 3 | 1 | Ichiro Hino | | |
| DPJ | 1,024,253 (21.2%) | 3 | 2 | Yasusuke Konta | | |
| DPJ | 1,024,253 (21.2%) | 3 | 3 | Takao Sato | Akita 1st | 99.4% |
| LP | 786,751 (16.3) | 3 | 3 | Kijuro Sugahara | | |
| LP | 786,751 (16.3) | 3 | 4 | Kentaro Kudo | Iwate 2nd | 45.1% |
| LP | 786,751 (16.3) | 3 | 5 | Yoshinobu Takahashi | | |
| SDP | 517,267 (10.7%) | 1 | 1 | Tetsuo Kanno | Miyagi 6th | 69.0% |
| Komei | 474,238 (9.8%) | 1 | 1 | Yoshihisa Inoue | | |
| JCP | 391,055 (8.1%) | 1 | 1 | Zenmei Matsumoto | | |

== Northern Kanto block ==
2000 Japanese general election in Northern Kanto
- 25 June 2000

All 51 seats to the House of Representatives
| | Majority party | Minority party | Third party |
|---|---|---|---|
| Party | LDP | DPJ | Komei |
| Last election | 28 seats | 4 seats | New |
| Constituency | 20 | 8 | 0 |
| PR seats | 7 | 5 | 3 |
| Total | 27 | 13 | 3 |
| Seat change | ▼1 | ▲9 | ▲3 |
| | Fourth party | Fifth party | Sixth party |
| Party | LP | JCP | SDP |
| Last election | New | 2 seats | 1 seat |
| Constituency | 0 | 0 | 0 |
| PR seats | 2 | 2 | 1 |
| Total | 2 | 2 | 1 |
| Seat change | ▲2 | 0 | 0 |
| | Seventh party | Eighth party |
| Party | IA | Ind. |
| Last election | New | 3 seats |
| Constituency | 1 | 2 |
| PR seats | 0 | – |
| Total | 1 | 2 |
| Seat change | ▲1 | ▼1 |

Single-member constituency results in Northern Kanto
| Constituency | Previous member | | Elected member | | Votes | % | Margin | Runner-up | | % | Status |
|---|---|---|---|---|---|---|---|---|---|---|---|
| Ibaraki 1st | Norihiko Akagi | LDP | Norihiko Akagi | LDP | 132,229 | 59.0 | 79,045 | Yumi Sato | DPJ | 23.7 | LDP hold |
| Ibaraki 2nd | Fukushiro Nukaga | LDP | Fukushiro Nukaga | LDP | 135,296 | 67.2 | 80,598 | Yoshiharu Tokoi | DPJ | 27.2 | LDP hold |
| Ibaraki 3rd | Toshio Nakayama | LDP | Nobuyuki Hanashi | LDP | 97,972 | 47.8 | 18,742 | Toshiaki Koizumi | DPJ | 38.7 | LDP hold |
| Ibaraki 4th | Seiroku Kajiyama | LDP | Hiroshi Kajiyama | LDP | 139,817 | 83.4 | 111,890 | Kiichi Owada | JCP | 16.6 | LDP hold |
| Ibaraki 5th | Hideo Okabe | LDP | Akihiro Ohata | DPJ | 65,995 | 45.7 | 3,620 | Hideo Okabe | LDP | 43.2 | DPJ gain from LDP |
| Ibaraki 6th | Yuya Niwa | LDP | Yuya Niwa | LDP | 125,581 | 56.5 | 74,289 | Hiroko Igarashi | DPJ | 23.1 | LDP hold |
| Ibaraki 7th | Kishirō Nakamura | Ind. | Kishirō Nakamura | Ind. | 88,095 | 44.1 | 36,271 | Katsuya Tanaka | Ind. | 26.0 | Ind. hold |
| Tochigi 1st | Hajime Funada | LDP | Hiroko Mizushima | DPJ | 107,634 | 48.0 | 16,223 | Hajime Funada | LDP | 40.7 | DPJ gain from LDP |
| Tochigi 2nd | Koya Nishikawa | LDP | Koya Nishikawa | LDP | 77,054 | 48.1 | 2,922 | Mamoru Kobayashi | DPJ | 46.3 | LDP hold |
| Tochigi 3rd | Yoshimi Watanabe | LDP | Yoshimi Watanabe | LDP | 112,358 | 83.4 | 89,966 | Shozo Maki | JCP | 16.6 | LDP hold |
| Tochigi 4th | Tsutomu Sato | LDP | Tsutomu Sato | LDP | 115,284 | 48.8 | 49,424 | Kenji Yamaoka | LP | 27.9 | LDP hold |
| Tochigi 5th | Toshimitsu Motegi | LDP | Toshimitsu Motegi | LDP | 108,837 | 63.6 | 59,666 | Kenichi Fukutomi | DPJ | 28.7 | LDP hold |
| Gunma 1st | Kōji Omi | LDP | Genichiro Sata | LDP | 134,247 | 59.1 | 72,589 | Tsugio Kumakawa | DPJ | 27.2 | LDP hold |
| Gunma 2nd | Takashi Sasagawa | LDP | Takashi Sasagawa | LDP | 76,743 | 39.7 | 20,121 | Osamu Morita | Ind. | 29.3 | LDP hold |
| Gunma 3rd | Yoshio Yatsu | LDP | Yoshio Yatsu | LDP | 99,345 | 57.6 | 38,509 | Hiroyoshi Sasagawa | DPJ | 35.2 | LDP hold |
| Gunma 4th | Yasuo Fukuda | LDP | Yasuo Fukuda | LDP | 94,517 | 57.7 | 45,454 | Masaki Nakajima | DPJ | 29.9 | LDP hold |
| Gunma 5th | Keizō Obuchi | LDP | Yūko Obuchi | LDP | 163,991 | 76.4 | 128,222 | Tsuruo Yamaguchi | SDP | 16.7 | LDP hold |
| Saitama 1st | Hikaru Matsunaga | LDP | Koichi Takemasa | DPJ | 105,783 | 42.7 | 18,425 | Hikaru Matsunaga | LDP | 35.2 | DPJ gain from LDP |
| Saitama 2nd | Katsuyuki Ishida | RC | Yoshitaka Shindō | LDP | 82,581 | 35.3 | 3,026 | Katsuyuki Ishida | RC | 34.0 | LDP gain from RC |
| Saitama 3rd | Hiroshi Imai | LDP | Ritsuo Hosokawa | DPJ | 105,054 | 47.0 | 17,710 | Hiroshi Imai | LDP | 39.1 | DPJ gain from LDP |
| Saitama 4th | Kiyoshi Ueda | DPJ | Kiyoshi Ueda | DPJ | 106,131 | 49.3 | 36,069 | Chuko Hayakawa | LDP | 32.5 | DPJ hold |
| Saitama 5th | Nobuhiko Fukunaga | LDP | Yukio Edano | DPJ | 106,711 | 45.5 | 20,532 | Nobuhiko Fukunaga | LDP | 36.8 | DPJ gain from LDP |
| Saitama 6th | Kaneshige Wakamatsu | Komei | Atsushi Oshima | DPJ | 80,342 | 35.6 | 2,342 | Kaneshige Wakamatsu | Komei | 34.6 | DPJ gain from Komei |
| Saitama 7th | Kiyoshi Nakano | LDP | Kiyoshi Nakano | LDP | 76,366 | 34.5 | 23,032 | Yasuko Komiyama | Ind. | 24.1 | LDP hold |
| Saitama 8th | Masayoshi Namiki | RC | Atsushi Kinoshita | DPJ | 52,816 | 28.3 | 1,826 | Masanori Arai | LDP | 27.3 | DPJ gain from RC |
| Saitama 9th | Matsushige Ono | LDP | Matsushige Ono | LDP | 110,836 | 48.6 | 28,316 | Fumihiko Igarashi | DPJ | 36.2 | LDP hold |
| Saitama 10th | Taimei Yamaguchi | LDP | Taimei Yamaguchi | LDP | 91,094 | 49.2 | 29,083 | Tetsuhisa Matsuzaki | DPJ | 33.5 | LDP hold |
| Saitama 11th | Takuji Kato | LDP | Ryuji Koizumi | Ind. | 89,084 | 38.8 | 11,314 | Takuji Kato | LDP | 33.9 | Ind. gain from LDP |
| Saitama 12th | Toshio Masuda | LDP | Toshio Kojima | LDP | 101,809 | 48.8 | 16,045 | Taneaki Tanami | DPJ | 41.1 | LDP hold |
| Saitama 13th | Shinako Tsuchiya | IA | Shinako Tsuchiya | IA | 127,028 | 51.7 | 86,993 | Yuriko Takeyama | LP | 16.3 | IA hold |
| Saitama 14th | Mitsubayashi Yataro | LDP | Takashi Mitsubayashi | LDP | 81,652 | 37.7 | 34,347 | Masayuki Nagamine | DPJ | 21.8 | LDP hold |

Proportional representation results
| Party | Votes | Seats | Rank | Elected member | Constituency | Ratio |
|---|---|---|---|---|---|---|
| LDP | 1,924,629 (30.6%) | 7 | 1 | Yasuhiro Nakasone | | |
| LDP | 1,924,629 (30.6%) | 7 | 2 | Mayumi Moriyama | | |
| LDP | 1,924,629 (30.6%) | 7 | 3 | Toshio Nakayama | | |
| LDP | 1,924,629 (30.6%) | 7 | 3 | Kōji Omi | | |
| LDP | 1,924,629 (30.6%) | 7 | 5 | Toshio Masuda | | |
| LDP | 1,924,629 (30.6%) | 7 | 6 | Susumu Hasumi | | |
| LDP | 1,924,629 (30.6%) | 7 | 7 | Shigeo Uetake | | |
| DPJ | 1,552,220 (24.7%) | 5 | 1 | Zenjiro Kaneko | | |
| DPJ | 1,552,220 (24.7%) | 5 | 2 | Mamoru Kobayashi | Tochigi 2nd | 96.2% |
| DPJ | 1,552,220 (24.7%) | 5 | 2 | Taneaki Tanami | Saitama 12th | 84.2% |
| DPJ | 1,552,220 (24.7%) | 5 | 2 | Toshiaki Koizumi | Ibaraki 3rd | 80.8% |
| DPJ | 1,552,220 (24.7%) | 5 | 2 | Fumihiko Igarashi | Saitama 9th | 74.4% |
| Komei | 793,124 (12.6%) | 3 | 1 | Keiichi Ishii | | |
| Komei | 793,124 (12.6%) | 3 | 2 | Fumi Aoyama | | |
| Komei | 793,124 (12.6%) | 3 | 3 | Kaneshige Wakamatsu | Saitama 6th | 97.0% |
| LP | 781,818 (12.4%) | 2 | 1 | Kenji Yamaoka | Tochigi 4th | 57.1% |
| LP | 781,818 (12.4%) | 2 | 1 | Yuriko Takeyama | Saitama 13th | 31.5% |
| JCP | 672,615 (10.7%) | 2 | 1 | Tsuneo Yajima | Saitama 7th | 48.7% |
| JCP | 672,615 (10.7%) | 2 | 2 | Tetsuya Shiokawa | Saitama 8th | 65.0% |
| SDP | 518,647 (8.3%) | 1 | 1 | Fumihiro Himori | Saitama 13th | 30.4% |

== Southern Kanto block ==
2000 Japanese general election in Southern Kanto
- 25 June 2000

All 53 seats to the House of Representatives
| | Majority party | Minority party | Third party |
|---|---|---|---|
| Party | LDP | DPJ | Komei |
| Last election | 28 seats | 7 seats | New |
| Constituency | 18 | 12 | 0 |
| PR seats | 6 | 6 | 3 |
| Total | 24 | 18 | 3 |
| Seat change | ▼4 | ▲11 | ▲3 |
| | Fourth party | Fifth party | Sixth party |
| Party | LP | JCP | SDP |
| Last election | New | 3 seats | 1 seat |
| Constituency | 1 | 0 | 0 |
| PR seats | 2 | 3 | 2 |
| Total | 3 | 3 | 2 |
| Seat change | ▲3 | 0 | ▲1 |
| | Seventh party |
| Party | IA |
| Last election | New |
| Constituency | 1 |
| PR seats | – |
| Total | 1 |
| Seat change | ▲1 |

Single-member constituency results in Southern Kanto
| Constituency | Previous member | | Elected member | | Votes | % | Margin | Runner-up | | % | Status |
|---|---|---|---|---|---|---|---|---|---|---|---|
| Chiba 1st | Hideo Usui | LDP | Hideo Usui | LDP | 90,358 | 44.8 | 23,980 | Kitamura Tetsuo | DPJ | 32.9 | LDP hold |
| Chiba 2nd | Kazuo Eguchi | LDP | Hisayasu Nagata | DPJ | 82,074 | 34.2 | 8,877 | Kazuo Eguchi | LDP | 30.5 | DPJ gain from LDP |
| Chiba 3rd | Masayuki Okajima | CP | Hirokazu Matsuno | LDP | 95,311 | 39.0 | 31,129 | Masayuki Okajima | CP | 26.3 | LDP gain from CP |
| Chiba 4th | Shōichi Tanaka | LDP | Yoshihiko Noda | DPJ | 116,156 | 47.3 | 40,089 | Kenichi Nishio | LDP | 31.0 | DPJ gain from LDP |
| Chiba 5th | Kou Tanaka | DPJ | Kou Tanaka | DPJ | 100,292 | 43.5 | 20,199 | Masaru Kanou | LDP | 34.7 | DPJ hold |
| Chiba 6th | Hiromichi Watanabe | LDP | Yukio Ubukata | DPJ | 78,359 | 41.0 | 4,897 | Sadao Ioku | LDP | 38.5 | DPJ gain from LDP |
| Chiba 7th | Kazuna Matsumoto | LDP | Kazuna Matsumoto | LDP | 81,252 | 38.8 | 18,960 | Akira Uchiyama | DPJ | 29.7 | LDP hold |
| Chiba 8th | Yoshitaka Sakurada | LDP | Hiroyuki Nagahama | DPJ | 91,220 | 39.6 | 3,155 | Yoshitaka Sakurada | LDP | 38.2 | DPJ gain from LDP |
| Chiba 9th | Yukio Jitsukawa | LDP | Kenichi Mizuno | LDP | 103,381 | 42.9 | 32,197 | Hiroshi Sudo | DPJ | 29.6 | LDP hold |
| Chiba 10th | Motoo Hayashi | LDP | Motoo Hayashi | LDP | 126,837 | 63.9 | 88,630 | Hiroshi Kuroyanagi | DPJ | 19.2 | LDP hold |
| Chiba 11th | Eisuke Mori | LDP | Eisuke Mori | LDP | 135,151 | 66.4 | 89,686 | Masahito Matsumoto | DPJ | 22.3 | LDP hold |
| Chiba 12th | Yasukazu Hamada | LDP | Shozaburo Nakamura | LDP | 124,966 | 58.6 | 67,902 | Zenzo Handa | DPJ | 26.8 | LDP hold |
| Kanagawa 1st | Jun Matsumoto | LDP | Kenichiro Sato | DPJ | 91,578 | 40.1 | 10,333 | Jun Matsumoto | LDP | 35.5 | DPJ gain from LDP |
| Kanagawa 2nd | Yoshihide Suga | LDP | Yoshihide Suga | LDP | 95,960 | 42.3 | 2,526 | Akira Oide | DPJ | 41.2 | LDP hold |
| Kanagawa 3rd | Tomoo Nishikawa | RC | Hachiro Okonogi | LDP | 61,016 | 29.3 | 5,627 | Naohiko Kato | DPJ | 26.6 | LDP gain from RC |
| Kanagawa 4th | Tadayoshi Iijima | LDP | Hisako Ōishi | DPJ | 73,979 | 37.6 | 21,511 | Tadayoshi Iijima | LDP | 26.7 | DPJ gain from LDP |
| Kanagawa 5th | Keishu Tanaka | DPJ | Keishu Tanaka | DPJ | 128,010 | 51.9 | 57,667 | Issei Suzuki | LDP | 28.5 | DPJ hold |
| Kanagawa 6th | Motohisa Ikeda | DPJ | Motohisa Ikeda | DPJ | 77,169 | 34.2 | 24,994 | Isamu Ueda | Komei | 23.1 | DPJ hold |
| Kanagawa 7th | Tsuneo Suzuki | LDP | Tsuneo Suzuki | LDP | 85,340 | 32.3 | 5,151 | Nobuhiko Suto | DPJ | 30.3 | LDP hold |
| Kanagawa 8th | Hiroshi Nakada | IA | Hiroshi Nakada | IA | 97,402 | 44.5 | 38,615 | Kenji Eda | LDP | 26.9 | IA hold |
| Kanagawa 9th | Shigefumi Matsuzawa | DPJ | Shigefumi Matsuzawa | DPJ | 122,551 | 52.6 | 57,570 | Eiichi Ogawa | LDP | 27.9 | DPJ hold |
| Kanagawa 10th | Eiji Nagai | DPJ | Kazunori Tanaka | LDP | 94,183 | 39.6 | 6,408 | Eiji Nagai | DPJ | 36.9 | LDP gain from DPJ |
| Kanagawa 11th | Junichiro Koizumi | LDP | Junichiro Koizumi | LDP | 157,335 | 69.0 | 114,628 | Yusuke Sawaki | DPJ | 18.7 | LDP hold |
| Kanagawa 12th | Ikuzo Sakurai | LDP | Yoichiro Esaki | DPJ | 54,237 | 28.1 | 3,423 | Ikuzo Sakurai | LDP | 26.3 | DPJ gain from LDP |
| Kanagawa 13th | Atsuhiro Tomizawa | DPJ | Akira Amari | LDP | 114,351 | 45.8 | 27,472 | Atsuhiro Tomizawa | DPJ | 34.8 | LDP gain from DPJ |
| Kanagawa 14th | Hirohisa Fujii | LP | Hirohisa Fujii | LP | 71,365 | 26.8 | 1,170 | Taei Nakamoto | LDP | 26.4 | LP hold |
| Kanagawa 15th | Taro Kono | LDP | Taro Kono | LDP | 120,001 | 47.4 | 63,058 | Takeshi Suzuki | DPJ | 22.5 | LDP hold |
| Kanagawa 16th | Yoshiyuki Kamei | LDP | Yoshiyuki Kamei | LDP | 99,966 | 52.1 | 46,704 | Takashi Yamajo | DPJ | 27.8 | LDP hold |
| Kanagawa 17th | Yōhei Kōno | LDP | Yōhei Kōno | LDP | 140,236 | 56.4 | 55,009 | Marutei Tsurunen | DPJ | 34.3 | LDP hold |
| Yamanashi 1st | Eiichi Nakao | LDP | Sakihito Ozawa | DPJ | 58,781 | 42.0 | 5,817 | Eiichi Nakao | LDP | 37.8 | DPJ gain from LDP |
| Yamanashi 2nd | Mitsuo Horiuchi | LDP | Mitsuo Horiuchi | LDP | 108,336 | 75.0 | 85,998 | Koichi Akiyama | JCP | 15.5 | LDP hold |
| Yamanashi 3rd | Shōmei Yokouchi | LDP | Shōmei Yokouchi | LDP | 86,300 | 55.8 | 31,783 | Hitoshi Goto | DPJ | 35.2 | LDP hold |

Proportional representation results
| Party | Votes | Seats | Rank | Elected member | Constituency | Ratio |
|---|---|---|---|---|---|---|
| DPJ | 1,940,792 (27.7%) | 6 | 1 | Kimiaki Matsuzaki | | |
| DPJ | 1,940,792 (27.7%) | 6 | 2 | Shun Hayama | | |
| DPJ | 1,940,792 (27.7%) | 6 | 3 | Hitoshi Goto | Yamanashi 3rd | 63.1% |
| DPJ | 1,940,792 (27.7%) | 6 | 4 | Akira Oide | Kanagawa 2nd | 97.3% |
| DPJ | 1,940,792 (27.7%) | 6 | 4 | Nobuhiko Suto | Kanagawa 7th | 93.9% |
| DPJ | 1,940,792 (27.7%) | 6 | 4 | Eiji Nagai | Kanagawa 10th | 93.2% |
| LDP | 1,734,297 (24.7%) | 6 | 1 | Yasukazu Hamada | | |
| LDP | 1,734,297 (24.7%) | 6 | 2 | Hiromichi Watanabe | | |
| LDP | 1,734,297 (24.7%) | 6 | 3 | Kenzo Yoneda | | |
| LDP | 1,734,297 (24.7%) | 6 | 4 | Yukio Jitsukawa | | |
| LDP | 1,734,297 (24.7%) | 6 | 5 | Taei Nakamoto | Kanagawa 14th | 98.3% |
| LDP | 1,734,297 (24.7%) | 6 | 5 | Yoshitaka Sakurada | Chiba 8th | 96.5% |
| Komei | 871,150 (12.4%) | 3 | 1 | Yuichi Ichikawa | | |
| Komei | 871,150 (12.4%) | 3 | 2 | Nobuo Kawakami | | |
| Komei | 871,150 (12.4%) | 3 | 3 | Isamu Ueda | Kanagawa 6th | 67.6% |
| LP | 839,845 (12.0%) | 2 | 2 | Takeshi Hidaka | Kanagawa 7th | 44.3% |
| LP | 839,845 (12.0%) | 2 | 2 | Ryushi Tsuchida | Kanagawa 6th | 31.6% |
| JCP | 808,453 (11.5%) | 2 | 1 | Kazuo Shii | | |
| JCP | 808,453 (11.5%) | 2 | 2 | Takeshi Omori | Kanagawa 5th | 37.6% |
| SDP | 670,141 (9.6%) | 2 | 1 | Tomoko Abe | Kanagawa 12th | 66.8% |
| SDP | 670,141 (9.6%) | 2 | 1 | Yoko Hara | Kanagawa 14th | 55.4% |

== Tokyo block ==
2000 Japanese general election in Tokyo
- 25 June 2000

All 42 seats to the House of Representatives
| | Majority party | Minority party | Third party |
|---|---|---|---|
| Party | DPJ | LDP | JCP |
| Last election | 9 seats | 19 seats | 3 seats |
| Constituency | 13 | 8 | 0 |
| PR seats | 6 | 4 | 2 |
| Total | 19 | 12 | 2 |
| Seat change | ▲10 | ▼7 | ▼1 |
| | Fourth party | Fifth party | Sixth party |
| Party | LP | Komei | SDP |
| Last election | New | New | 1 seat |
| Constituency | 0 | 0 | 0 |
| PR seats | 2 | 2 | 1 |
| Total | 2 | 2 | 1 |
| Seat change | ▲2 | ▲1 | 0 |
| | Seventh party | Eighth party |
| Party | CP | Ind. |
| Last election | New | 1 seat |
| Constituency | 1 | 3 |
| PR seats | 0 | – |
| Total | 1 | 3 |
| Seat change | ▲1 | ▲2 |

Single-member constituency results in Tokyo
| Constituency | Previous member | | Elected member | | Votes | % | Margin | Runner-up | | % | Status |
|---|---|---|---|---|---|---|---|---|---|---|---|
| Tokyo 1st | Kaoru Yosano | LDP | Banri Kaieda | DPJ | 93,173 | 41.3 | 2,633 | Kaoru Yosano | LDP | 40.1 | DPJ gain from LDP |
| Tokyo 2nd | Yoshikatsu Nakayama | DPJ | Yoshikatsu Nakayama | DPJ | 88,744 | 41.9 | 6,821 | Takashi Fukaya | LDP | 38.7 | DPJ hold |
| Tokyo 3rd | Shinichiro Kurimoto | LL | Jin Matsubara | DPJ | 84,372 | 33.7 | 1,418 | Sho Naito | LDP | 33.1 | DPJ gain from LL |
| Tokyo 4th | Kensaku Morita | Ind. | Kensaku Morita | Ind. | 92,711 | 38.4 | 33,224 | Otohiko Endō | Komei | 24.7 | Ind. hold |
| Tokyo 5th | Takashi Kosugi | LDP | Yoshio Tezuka | DPJ | 83,619 | 34.9 | 4,010 | Takashi Kosugi | LDP | 33.2 | DPJ gain from LDP |
| Tokyo 6th | Tetsundo Iwakuni | DPJ | Kōki Ishii | DPJ | 93,919 | 37.3 | 38,098 | Michio Ochi | LDP | 22.2 | DPJ hold |
| Tokyo 7th | Shigeru Kasuya | LDP | Akira Nagatsuma | DPJ | 82,502 | 35.7 | 5,095 | Shigeru Kasuya | LDP | 33.5 | DPJ gain from LDP |
| Tokyo 8th | Nobuteru Ishihara | LDP | Nobuteru Ishihara | LDP | 105,779 | 43.7 | 28,647 | Mitsuyo Katayama | DPJ | 31.8 | LDP hold |
| Tokyo 9th | Koichi Yoshida | DPJ | Koichi Yoshida | DPJ | 86,450 | 35.4 | 4,538 | Isshu Sugawara | LDP | 33.6 | DPJ hold |
| Tokyo 10th | Kōki Kobayashi | LDP | Kōki Kobayashi | LDP | 71,318 | 38.8 | 7,046 | Muneaki Samejima | DPJ | 34.9 | LDP hold |
| Tokyo 11th | Hakubun Shimomura | LDP | Hakubun Shimomura | LDP | 90,483 | 37.8 | 25,374 | Osamu Shibutani | DPJ | 27.2 | LDP hold |
| Tokyo 12th | Eita Yashiro | LDP | Eita Yashiro | LDP | 90,208 | 40.7 | 25,295 | Yukihisa Fujita | DPJ | 29.3 | LDP hold |
| Tokyo 13th | Ichirō Kamoshita | LDP | Ichirō Kamoshita | LDP | 90,567 | 42.0 | 37,571 | Koriki Jojima | DPJ | 24.6 | LDP hold |
| Tokyo 14th | Taiichirō Nishikawa | CP | Taiichirō Nishikawa | CP | 73,209 | 40.0 | 9,145 | Kazuo Inoue | DPJ | 35.0 | CP hold |
| Tokyo 15th | Ben Kimura | LDP | Koji Kakizawa | Ind. | 54,298 | 28.8 | 1,406 | Ben Kimura | LDP | 28.1 | Ind. gain from LDP |
| Tokyo 16th | Yoshinobu Shimamura | LDP | Yoshio Udagawa | Ind. | 72,825 | 32.1 | 3,282 | Yoshinobu Shimamura | LDP | 30.6 | Ind. gain from LDP |
| Tokyo 17th | Katsuei Hirasawa | LDP | Katsuei Hirasawa | LDP | 95,606 | 37.6 | 20,973 | Natsuo Yamaguchi | Komei | 29.4 | LDP hold |
| Tokyo 18th | Naoto Kan | DPJ | Naoto Kan | DPJ | 114,750 | 56.1 | 65,010 | Hisanori Kataoka | LDP | 24.3 | DPJ hold |
| Tokyo 19th | Yoshinori Suematsu | DPJ | Yoshinori Suematsu | DPJ | 118,852 | 45.4 | 45,776 | Koji Tsukahara | LDP | 27.9 | DPJ hold |
| Tokyo 20th | Yuriko Ohno | Komei | Koichi Kato | DPJ | 93,236 | 39.5 | 34,623 | Yuriko Ohno | Komei | 24.8 | DPJ gain from Komei |
| Tokyo 21st | Joji Yamamoto | DPJ | Joji Yamamoto | DPJ | 98,775 | 47.5 | 25,708 | Sekiichi Kato | LDP | 35.1 | DPJ hold |
| Tokyo 22nd | Tatsuya Ito | LDP | Ikuo Yamahana | DPJ | 104,132 | 38.9 | 26,371 | Yuji Shindo | LDP | 29.0 | DPJ gain from LDP |
| Tokyo 23rd | Kosuke Ito | LDP | Kosuke Ito | LDP | 100,271 | 39.6 | 13,039 | Eiko Ishige | DPJ | 34.4 | LDP hold |
| Tokyo 24th | Tamon Kobayashi | LDP | Yukihiko Akutsu | DPJ | 106,292 | 44.5 | 11,190 | Tamon Kobayashi | LDP | 39.8 | DPJ gain from LDP |
| Tokyo 25th | Yozo Ishikawa | LDP | Yozo Ishikawa | LDP | 88,007 | 48.9 | 25,655 | Hisashi Shimada | DPJ | 34.6 | LDP hold |

Proportional representation results
| Party | Votes | Seats | Rank | Elected member | Constituency | Ratio |
|---|---|---|---|---|---|---|
| DPJ | 1,653,045 (29.0%) | 6 | 1 | Tetsundo Iwakuni | | |
| DPJ | 1,653,045 (29.0%) | 6 | 2 | Koriki Jojima | Tokyo 13th | 58.5% |
| DPJ | 1,653,045 (29.0%) | 6 | 3 | Muneaki Samejima | Tokyo 10th | 90.1% |
| DPJ | 1,653,045 (29.0%) | 6 | 3 | Kazuo Inoue | Tokyo 14th | 87.5% |
| DPJ | 1,653,045 (29.0%) | 6 | 3 | Eiko Ishige | Tokyo 23rd | 87.0% |
| DPJ | 1,653,045 (29.0%) | 6 | 3 | Hirosato Nakatsugawa | Tokyo 16th | 74.0% |
| LDP | 1,110,177 (19.5%) | 4 | 1 | Midori Matsushima | | |
| LDP | 1,110,177 (19.5%) | 4 | 2 | Kunio Hatoyama | | |
| LDP | 1,110,177 (19.5%) | 4 | 3 | Tatsuya Ito | | |
| LDP | 1,110,177 (19.5%) | 4 | 4 | Ichiro Takahashi | | |
| JCP | 817,045 (14.3%) | 2 | 1 | Tetsuzo Fuwa | | |
| JCP | 817,045 (14.3%) | 2 | 2 | Tomio Yamaguchi | | |
| LP | 776,018 (13.6%) | 2 | 1 | Shozo Azuma | Tokyo 15th | 41.9% |
| LP | 776,018 (13.6%) | 2 | 1 | Yoshio Suzuki | Tokyo 6th | 32.9% |
| Komei | 726,203 (12.7%) | 2 | 1 | Akihiro Ota | | |
| Komei | 726,203 (12.7%) | 2 | 2 | Yōsuke Takagi | | |
| SDP | 377,230 (6.6%) | 1 | 1 | Nobuto Hosaka | Tokyo 6th | 40.6% |

== Hokuriku-Shin'etsu block ==
2000 Japanese general election in Hokuriku-Shin'etsu
- 25 June 2000

All 31 seats to the House of Representatives
| | Majority party | Minority party | Third party |
|---|---|---|---|
| Party | LDP | DPJ | LP |
| Last election | 19 seats | 3 seats | New |
| Constituency | 16 | 3 | 0 |
| PR seats | 4 | 3 | 1 |
| Total | 20 | 6 | 1 |
| Seat change | ▲1 | ▲3 | ▲1 |
| | Fourth party | Fifth party | Sixth party |
| Party | SDP | JCP | Komei |
| Last election | 1 seat | 1 seat | New |
| Constituency | 0 | 0 | 0 |
| PR seats | 1 | 1 | 1 |
| Total | 1 | 1 | 1 |
| Seat change | 0 | 0 | ▲1 |
| | Seventh party |
| Party | Ind. |
| Last election | 0 seats |
| Constituency | 1 |
| PR seats | – |
| Total | 1 |
| Seat change | ▲1 |

Single-member constituency results in Hokuriku-Shin'etsu
| Constituency | Previous member | | Elected member | | Votes | % | Margin | Runner-up | | % | Status |
|---|---|---|---|---|---|---|---|---|---|---|---|
| Niigata 1st | Rokuzaemon Yoshida | LDP | Rokuzaemon Yoshida | LDP | 98,952 | 43.2 | 18,408 | Nobuyuki Sekiyama | DPJ | 35.1 | LDP hold |
| Niigata 2nd | Shin Sakurai | LDP | Motohiko Kondo | Ind. | 123,811 | 49.1 | 23,591 | Shin Sakurai | LDP | 39.7 | Ind. gain from LDP |
| Niigata 3rd | Yamato Inaba | LDP | Yamato Inaba | LDP | 111,819 | 51.2 | 54,410 | Saburo Shirasawa | LP | 26.3 | LDP hold |
| Niigata 4th | Hirohisa Kurihara | LDP | Hirohisa Kurihara | LDP | 72,604 | 33.2 | 2,694 | Makiko Kikuta | LP | 32.0 | LDP hold |
| Niigata 5th | Makiko Tanaka | LDP | Makiko Tanaka | LDP | 137,866 | 68.6 | 87,658 | Kichinosuke Meguro | SDP | 25.0 | LDP hold |
| Niigata 6th | Osamu Takatori | LDP | Nobutaka Tsutsui | DPJ | 119,734 | 49.3 | 5,330 | Katsuhiko Shirakawa | LDP | 47.1 | DPJ gain from LDP |
| Toyama 1st | Jinen Nagase | LDP | Jinen Nagase | LDP | 66,576 | 42.9 | 26,210 | Tadashi Hirono | LP | 26.0 | LDP hold |
| Toyama 2nd | Mitsuhiro Miyakoshi | LDP | Mitsuhiro Miyakoshi | LDP | 105,449 | 66.6 | 67,882 | Yoshihide Takagishi | DPJ | 23.7 | LDP hold |
| Toyama 3rd | Tamisuke Watanuki | LDP | Tamisuke Watanuki | LDP | 150,200 | 58.5 | 103,722 | Keizo Nobata | DPJ | 18.1 | LDP hold |
| Ishikawa 1st | Ken Okuda | DPJ | Hiroshi Hase | LDP | 107,179 | 48.8 | 6,787 | Ken Okuda | DPJ | 45.7 | LDP gain from DPJ |
| Ishikawa 2nd | Yoshirō Mori | LDP | Yoshirō Mori | LDP | 142,457 | 64.4 | 74,701 | Yasuo Ichikawa | LP | 30.6 | LDP hold |
| Ishikawa 3rd | Riki Kawara | LDP | Riki Kawara | LDP | 133,667 | 72.4 | 93,980 | Kenzaburo Ikeda | DPJ | 21.5 | LDP hold |
| Fukui 1st | Ryuzo Sasaki | Ind. | Isao Matsumiya | LDP | 61,707 | 43.0 | 7,473 | Ryuzo Sasaki | Ind. | 37.8 | LDP gain from Ind. |
| Fukui 2nd | Takamori Makino | LDP | Takamori Makino | LDP | 98,361 | 68.5 | 62,236 | Keimin Kyoto | DPJ | 25.2 | LDP hold |
| Fukui 3rd | Kazuhiko Tsuji | DPJ | Tsuyoshi Takagi | LDP | 81,698 | 52.5 | 15,300 | Kazuhiko Tsuji | DPJ | 42.7 | LDP gain from DPJ |
| Nagano 1st | Kenji Kosaka | LDP | Kenji Kosaka | LDP | 127,010 | 48.7 | 45,181 | Yoshikazu Kanakubo | DPJ | 31.2 | LDP hold |
| Nagano 2nd | Jin Murai | LDP | Jin Murai | LDP | 95,046 | 38.0 | 13,336 | Mitsu Shimojo | DPJ | 32.7 | LDP hold |
| Nagano 3rd | Tsutomu Hata | DPJ | Tsutomu Hata | DPJ | 163,382 | 61.2 | 96,380 | Tadao Iwasaki | LDP | 25.1 | DPJ hold |
| Nagano 4th | Hajime Ogawa | LDP | Shigeyuki Goto | DPJ | 78,397 | 43.8 | 5,625 | Hajime Ogawa | LDP | 40.7 | DPJ gain from LDP |
| Nagano 5th | Sohei Miyashita | LDP | Sohei Miyashita | LDP | 120,337 | 57.0 | 64,601 | Takashi Kato | DPJ | 26.4 | LDP hold |

Proportional representation results
| Party | Votes | Seats | Rank | Elected member | Constituency | Ratio |
|---|---|---|---|---|---|---|
| LDP | 1,414,622 (35.0%) | 4 | 1 | Osamu Takatori | | |
| LDP | 1,414,622 (35.0%) | 4 | 2 | Kyogon Hagiyama | | |
| LDP | 1,414,622 (35.0%) | 4 | 3 | Kotaro Tachibana | | |
| LDP | 1,414,622 (35.0%) | 4 | 4 | Tadao Iwasaki | Nagano 3rd | 41.0% |
| DPJ | 1,024,328 (25.3%) | 3 | 1 | Ikuo Horigome | | |
| DPJ | 1,024,328 (25.3%) | 3 | 2 | Yutaka Kuwabara | | |
| DPJ | 1,024,328 (25.3%) | 3 | 3 | Ken Okuda | Ishikawa 1st | 93.6% |
| LP | 448,526 (11.1%) | 1 | 1 | Yasuo Ichikawa | Ishikawa 2nd | 47.5% |
| SDP | 418,752 (10.4%) | 1 | 1 | Wakako Yamaguchi | Nagano 2nd | 47.9% |
| JCP | 371,247 (9.2%) | 1 | 1 | Hideo Kijima | Nagano 4th | 35.2% |
| Komei | 354,554 (8.8%) | 1 | 1 | Yoshio Urushibara | | |

== Tokai block ==
2000 Japanese general election in Tokai
- 25 June 2000

All 55 seats to the House of Representatives
| | Majority party | Minority party | Third party |
|---|---|---|---|
| Party | LDP | DPJ | Komei |
| Last election | 24 seats | 5 seats | New |
| Constituency | 16 | 15 | 0 |
| PR seats | 7 | 7 | 2 |
| Total | 23 | 22 | 2 |
| Seat change | ▼1 | ▲17 | ▲2 |
| | Fourth party | Fifth party | Sixth party |
| Party | JCP | LP | SDP |
| Last election | 3 seats | New | 1 seat |
| Constituency | 0 | 0 | 0 |
| PR seats | 2 | 2 | 1 |
| Total | 2 | 2 | 1 |
| Seat change | ▼1 | ▲2 | 0 |
| | Seventh party | Eighth party |
| Party | CP | Ind. |
| Last election | New | 1 seat |
| Constituency | 1 | 2 |
| PR seats | 0 | – |
| Total | 1 | 2 |
| Seat change | ▲1 | ▲1 |

Single-member constituency results in Tokai
| Constituency | Previous member | | Elected member | | Votes | % | Margin | Runner-up | | % | Status |
|---|---|---|---|---|---|---|---|---|---|---|---|
| Gifu 1st | Seiko Noda | LDP | Seiko Noda | LDP | 100,425 | 52.3 | 43,674 | Kazo Watanabe | DPJ | 29.6 | LDP hold |
| Gifu 2nd | Yasufumi Tanahashi | LDP | Yasufumi Tanahashi | LDP | 120,053 | 57.3 | 44,070 | Shojiro Kojima | DPJ | 36.2 | LDP hold |
| Gifu 3rd | Kabun Mutō | LDP | Kabun Mutō | LDP | 129,842 | 53.0 | 39,968 | Yasuhiro Sonoda | DPJ | 36.7 | LDP hold |
| Gifu 4th | Takao Fujii | LDP | Kazuyoshi Kaneko | LDP | 157,761 | 62.5 | 85,086 | Ryoji Yamada | DPJ | 28.8 | LDP hold |
| Gifu 5th | Keiji Furuya | LDP | Keiji Furuya | LDP | 114,654 | 57.6 | 57,996 | Norio Takeda | DPJ | 28.5 | LDP hold |
| Shizuoka 1st | Yoshinori Oguchi | Komei | Yōko Kamikawa | Ind. | 58,358 | 24.2 | 572 | Seishu Makino | DPJ | 24.0 | Ind. gain from Komei |
| Shizuoka 2nd | Shozo Harada | LDP | Shozo Harada | LDP | 92,905 | 36.8 | 16,571 | Shogo Tsugawa | DPJ | 30.3 | LDP hold |
| Shizuoka 3rd | Hakuo Yanagisawa | LDP | Hakuo Yanagisawa | LDP | 140,242 | 60.1 | 68,701 | Yasushi Suzuki | DPJ | 30.7 | LDP hold |
| Shizuoka 4th | Yoshio Mochizuki | LDP | Yoshio Mochizuki | LDP | 78,295 | 57.4 | 39,982 | Takeo Kawai | DPJ | 28.1 | LDP hold |
| Shizuoka 5th | Toshitsugu Saito | LDP | Toshitsugu Saito | LDP | 84,743 | 49.8 | 30,733 | Akiko Izumi | DPJ | 31.8 | LDP hold |
| Shizuoka 6th | Shu Watanabe | DPJ | Shu Watanabe | DPJ | 115,223 | 53.4 | 29,765 | Mitsuo Sakurada | LDP | 39.6 | DPJ hold |
| Shizuoka 7th | Yoshiaki Kibe | LDP | Goshi Hosono | DPJ | 73,044 | 30.3 | 16,219 | Yoshiaki Kibe | LDP | 23.6 | DPJ gain from LDP |
| Shizuoka 8th | Ryū Shionoya | LDP | Yasutomo Suzuki | DPJ | 102,938 | 46.9 | 7,405 | Ryū Shionoya | LDP | 43.5 | DPJ gain from LDP |
| Shizuoka 9th | Hiroshi Kumagai | DPJ | Hiroshi Kumagai | DPJ | 96,839 | 46.1 | 3,535 | Shinichi Suzui | LDP | 44.4 | DPJ hold |
| Aichi 1st | Takashi Kawamura | DPJ | Takashi Kawamura | DPJ | 79,817 | 42.1 | 25,976 | Yoneo Hirata | Komei | 28.4 | DPJ hold |
| Aichi 2nd | Hiroyuki Aoki | CP | Motohisa Furukawa | DPJ | 91,888 | 47.6 | 44,619 | Moriyuki Taniguchi | LDP | 24.5 | DPJ gain from CP |
| Aichi 3rd | Yukihiro Yoshida | LDP | Shoichi Kondo | DPJ | 95,533 | 49.5 | 33,291 | Takeshi Kataoka | LDP | 32.3 | DPJ gain from LDP |
| Aichi 4th | Jun Misawa | CP | Yoshio Maki | DPJ | 57,760 | 35.1 | 3,689 | Jun Misawa | CP | 32.9 | DPJ gain from CP |
| Aichi 5th | Hirotaka Akamatsu | DPJ | Hirotaka Akamatsu | DPJ | 82,943 | 48.3 | 17,973 | Takahide Kimura | LDP | 37.8 | DPJ hold |
| Aichi 6th | Shozo Kusakawa | Komei | Yukichi Maeda | DPJ | 97,714 | 39.0 | 5,393 | Shozo Kusakawa | Komei | 36.8 | DPJ gain from Komei |
| Aichi 7th | Takashi Aoyama | LDP | Kenji Kobayashi | DPJ | 86,651 | 38.5 | 3,050 | Junji Suzuki | LDP | 37.2 | DPJ gain from LDP |
| Aichi 8th | Toichiro Kuno | LDP | Hiroshi Oki | LDP | 84,641 | 35.2 | 653 | Yutaka Banno | DPJ | 35.0 | LDP hold |
| Aichi 9th | Toshiki Kaifu | CP | Toshiki Kaifu | CP | 122,175 | 53.2 | 48,854 | Yoshie Meguro | DPJ | 31.9 | CP hold |
| Aichi 10th | Tetsuma Esaki | CP | Kanju Sato | DPJ | 99,970 | 36.5 | 13,554 | Tetsuma Esaki | CP | 31.6 | DPJ gain from CP |
| Aichi 11th | Eisei Ito | DPJ | Eisei Ito | DPJ | 130,473 | 57.6 | 50,563 | Akiko Yamanaka | LDP | 35.3 | DPJ hold |
| Aichi 12th | Seiken Sugiura | LDP | Seiken Sugiura | LDP | 117,475 | 45.6 | 35,649 | Yasuhiro Nakane | DPJ | 31.7 | LDP hold |
| Aichi 13th | Satoshi Shima | DPJ | Hideaki Ōmura | LDP | 104,731 | 45.9 | 339 | Satoshi Shima | DPJ | 45.8 | LDP gain from DPJ |
| Aichi 14th | Katsuhito Asano | LDP | Katsuhito Asano | LDP | 67,256 | 37.8 | 2,520 | Katsumasa Suzuki | Ind. | 36.4 | LDP hold |
| Aichi 15th | Keijiro Murata | LDP | Akihiko Yamamoto | LDP | 96,086 | 48.9 | 18,742 | Tsuyoshi Kondo | DPJ | 39.3 | LDP hold |
| Mie 1st | Hiroshi Nakai | LP | Jirō Kawasaki | LDP | 104,484 | 50.9 | 27,811 | Hiroshi Nakai | LP | 37.3 | LDP gain from LP |
| Mie 2nd | Masaharu Nakagawa | DPJ | Masaharu Nakagawa | DPJ | 111,410 | 57.4 | 40,922 | Kenjo Ibi | LDP | 36.3 | DPJ hold |
| Mie 3rd | Katsuya Okada | DPJ | Katsuya Okada | DPJ | 117,868 | 54.2 | 35,646 | Koichi Hirata | LDP | 37.8 | DPJ hold |
| Mie 4th | Norihisa Tamura | LDP | Norihisa Tamura | LDP | 97,276 | 62.8 | 54,386 | Kengo Kishida | DPJ | 27.7 | LDP hold |
| Mie 5th | Takao Fujinami | Ind. | Takao Fujinami | Ind. | 85,254 | 46.2 | 3,032 | Takeshi Yamamura | DPJ | 44.5 | Ind. hold |

Proportional representation results
| Party | Votes | Seats | Rank | Elected member | Constituency | Ratio |
|---|---|---|---|---|---|---|
| DPJ | 2,151,270 (30.6%) | 7 | 1 | Eriko Yamatani | | |
| DPJ | 2,151,270 (30.6%) | 7 | 2 | Chuji Ito | | |
| DPJ | 2,151,270 (30.6%) | 7 | 3 | Satoshi Shima | Aichi 13th | 99.6% |
| DPJ | 2,151,270 (30.6%) | 7 | 3 | Yutaka Banno | Aichi 8th | 99.2% |
| DPJ | 2,151,270 (30.6%) | 7 | 3 | Seishu Makino | Shizuoka 1st | 99.0% |
| DPJ | 2,151,270 (30.6%) | 7 | 3 | Takeshi Yamamura | Mie 5th | 96.4% |
| DPJ | 2,151,270 (30.6%) | 7 | 3 | Shogo Tsugawa | Shizuoka 2nd | 82.1% |
| LDP | 2,011,334 (28.6%) | 7 | 1 | Takao Fujii | | |
| LDP | 2,011,334 (28.6%) | 7 | 2 | Norio Sugiyama | | |
| LDP | 2,011,334 (28.6%) | 7 | 3 | Yukihiro Yoshida | | |
| LDP | 2,011,334 (28.6%) | 7 | 4 | Takashi Aoyama | | |
| LDP | 2,011,334 (28.6%) | 7 | 5 | Takehiko Tanida | | |
| LDP | 2,011,334 (28.6%) | 7 | 6 | Takahide Kimura | Aichi 5th | 78.3% |
| LDP | 2,011,334 (28.6%) | 7 | 7 | Masatoshi Kurata | | |
| Komei | 818,473 (11.7%) | 2 | 1 | Chikara Sakaguchi | | |
| Komei | 818,473 (11.7%) | 2 | 2 | Masatomo Kawai | | |
| JCP | 699,970 (10.0%) | 2 | 1 | Kensho Sasaki | | |
| JCP | 699,970 (10.0%) | 2 | 2 | Yukiko Seko | Aichi 4th | 65.1% |
| LP | 683,153 (9.7%) | 2 | 1 | Hiroshi Nakai | Mie 1st | 73.3% |
| LP | 683,153 (9.7%) | 2 | 2 | Yuzuru Tsuzuki | Aichi 12th | 28.1% |
| SDP | 519,193 (7.4%) | 1 | 1 | Reiko Oshima | Aichi 7th | 32.4% |

== Kinki block ==
2000 Japanese general election in Kinki
- 25 June 2000

All 77 seats to the House of Representatives
| | Majority party | Minority party | Third party |
|---|---|---|---|
| Party | LDP | DPJ | Komei |
| Last election | 23 seats | 5 seats | New |
| Constituency | 23 | 10 | 6 |
| PR seats | 7 | 7 | 5 |
| Total | 30 | 17 | 11 |
| Seat change | ▲7 | ▲12 | ▲11 |
| | Fourth party | Fifth party | Sixth party |
| Party | JCP | SDP | CP |
| Last election | 7 seats | 3 seats | New |
| Constituency | 0 | 2 | 4 |
| PR seats | 5 | 3 | 0 |
| Total | 5 | 5 | 4 |
| Seat change | ▼2 | ▲2 | ▲4 |
| | Seventh party | Eighth party |
| Party | LP | Ind. |
| Last election | New | 2 seats |
| Constituency | 0 | 2 |
| PR seats | 3 | – |
| Total | 3 | 2 |
| Seat change | ▲3 | 0 |

Single-member constituency results in Kinki
| Constituency | Previous member | | Elected member | | Votes | % | Margin | Runner-up | | % | Status |
|---|---|---|---|---|---|---|---|---|---|---|---|
| Shiga 1st | Tatsuo Kawabata | DPJ | Tatsuo Kawabata | DPJ | 78,834 | 44.2 | 11,833 | Makoto Mekata | LDP | 37.6 | DPJ hold |
| Shiga 2nd | Masayoshi Takemura | Ind. | Akira Konishi | LDP | 125,625 | 45.7 | 10,303 | Masayoshi Takemura | Ind. | 42.0 | LDP gain from Ind. |
| Shiga 3rd | Mineichi Iwanaga | LDP | Mineichi Iwanaga | LDP | 93,044 | 43.8 | 3,686 | Tenzo Okumura | Ind. | 42.1 | LDP hold |
| Kyoto 1st | Bunmei Ibuki | LDP | Bunmei Ibuki | LDP | 86,490 | 42.1 | 17,997 | Keiji Kokuta | JCP | 33.4 | LDP hold |
| Kyoto 2nd | Mikio Okuda | LDP | Seiji Maehara | DPJ | 52,077 | 33.5 | 4,020 | Naohiko Yamamoto | LDP | 30.9 | DPJ gain from LDP |
| Kyoto 3rd | Iwao Teramae | JCP | Shigehiko Okuyama | LDP | 66,576 | 36.5 | 9,040 | Kenta Izumi | DPJ | 31.5 | LDP gain from JCP |
| Kyoto 4th | Hiromu Nonaka | LDP | Hiromu Nonaka | LDP | 121,439 | 53.0 | 66,793 | Shiro Kamine | JCP | 23.9 | LDP hold |
| Kyoto 5th | Sadakazu Tanigaki | LDP | Sadakazu Tanigaki | LDP | 109,508 | 63.5 | 74,556 | Sayumi Yoshida | JCP | 20.3 | LDP hold |
| Kyoto 6th | Kazuya Tamaki | DPJ | Yoshiaki Hishida | LDP | 96,082 | 38.2 | 7,690 | Kazuya Tamaki | DPJ | 35.2 | LDP gain from DPJ |
| Osaka 1st | Kōki Chūma | LDP | Kōki Chūma | LDP | 87,068 | 50.2 | 45,637 | Toshihiro Konishi | DPJ | 23.9 | LDP hold |
| Osaka 2nd | Megumu Sato | LDP | Megumu Sato | LDP | 90,470 | 47.5 | 34,318 | Ikuko Ishii | JCP | 29.5 | LDP hold |
| Osaka 3rd | Masahiro Tabata | Komei | Masahiro Tabata | Komei | 90,605 | 46.1 | 16,550 | Mieko Kobayashi | JCP | 37.7 | Komei hold |
| Osaka 4th | Tadashi Maeda | RC | Masaaki Nakayama | LDP | 63,290 | 30.7 | 9,252 | Osamu Yoshida | DPJ | 26.2 | LDP gain from RC |
| Osaka 5th | Takayoshi Taniguchi | Komei | Takayoshi Taniguchi | Komei | 79,018 | 37.3 | 12,339 | Tetsuo Inami | DPJ | 31.5 | Komei hold |
| Osaka 6th | Yutaka Fukushima | Komei | Yutaka Fukushima | Komei | 96,432 | 49.7 | 30,164 | Sei Yanagawase | JCP | 34.1 | Komei hold |
| Osaka 7th | Osamu Fujimura | DPJ | Osamu Fujimura | DPJ | 63,455 | 34.1 | 11,245 | Issei Inoue | CP | 28.1 | DPJ hold |
| Osaka 8th | Kansei Nakano | DPJ | Kansei Nakano | DPJ | 83,566 | 48.4 | 28,707 | Tsuyoshi Kamise | LDP | 31.8 | DPJ hold |
| Osaka 9th | Takeshi Nishida | CP | Nobumori Otani | DPJ | 82,563 | 36.5 | 17,094 | Takeshi Nishida | CP | 29.0 | DPJ gain from CP |
| Osaka 10th | Kazuo Ishigaki | Komei | Kiyomi Tsujimoto | SDP | 55,839 | 29.7 | 731 | Kazuo Ishigaki | Komei | 29.3 | SDP gain from Komei |
| Osaka 11th | Hirofumi Hirano | DPJ | Hirofumi Hirano | DPJ | 120,895 | 55.5 | 61,092 | Kazutaka Tsuboi | LDP | 27.4 | DPJ hold |
| Osaka 12th | Shinji Tarutoko | DPJ | Shinji Tarutoko | DPJ | 72,393 | 38.7 | 3,620 | Tomokatsu Kitagawa | LDP | 36.8 | DPJ hold |
| Osaka 13th | Akira Nishino | CP | Masajuro Shiokawa | LDP | 109,614 | 53.3 | 54,518 | Hidekatsu Yoshii | JCP | 26.8 | LDP gain from CP |
| Osaka 14th | Eiichi Nakamura | CP | Takashi Tanihata | LDP | 105,624 | 46.7 | 38,026 | Takashi Yamamoto | DPJ | 29.9 | LDP gain from CP |
| Osaka 15th | Naokazu Takemoto | LDP | Naokazu Takemoto | LDP | 100,028 | 46.7 | 39,489 | Isao Aida | DPJ | 28.3 | LDP hold |
| Osaka 16th | Kazuo Kitagawa | Komei | Kazuo Kitagawa | Komei | 64,150 | 39.1 | 13,095 | Taizo Masago | Ind. | 31.1 | Komei hold |
| Osaka 17th | Shingo Nishimura | LP | Nobuko Okashita | LDP | 41,781 | 23.5 | 4,947 | Yutaka Manabe | JCP | 20.7 | LDP gain from LP |
| Osaka 18th | Taro Nakayama | LDP | Taro Nakayama | LDP | 103,402 | 47.5 | 39,143 | Makoto Kita | DPJ | 29.5 | LDP hold |
| Osaka 19th | Kenshiro Matsunami | CP | Kenshiro Matsunami | CP | 81,641 | 53.1 | 34,730 | Toshitaka Ishida | DPJ | 30.5 | CP hold |
| Hyogo 1st | Hajime Ishii | DPJ | Hajime Ishii | DPJ | 62,431 | 34.9 | 265 | Keisuke Sunada | LDP | 34.8 | DPJ hold |
| Hyogo 2nd | Kazuyoshi Akaba | Komei | Kazuyoshi Akaba | Komei | 79,750 | 43.3 | 12,930 | Junko Hiramatsu | JCP | 36.2 | Komei hold |
| Hyogo 3rd | Ryuichi Doi | DPJ | Ryuichi Doi | DPJ | 66,547 | 36.5 | 16,511 | Hiromitsu Ikawa | LDP | 27.5 | DPJ hold |
| Hyogo 4th | Kiichi Inoue | CP | Kiichi Inoue | CP | 143,441 | 64.9 | 91,953 | Kazushi Seo | JCP | 23.3 | CP hold |
| Hyogo 5th | Yoichi Tani | LDP | Yoichi Tani | LDP | 105,230 | 42.3 | 16,828 | Kenji Yoshioka | DPJ | 35.5 | LDP hold |
| Hyogo 6th | Yuriko Koike | CP | Yuriko Koike | CP | 84,647 | 33.8 | 10,716 | Koichiro Ichimura | DPJ | 29.5 | CP hold |
| Hyogo 7th | Takako Doi | SDP | Takako Doi | SDP | 144,168 | 62.8 | 96,865 | Kazusa Noda | CP | 20.6 | SDP hold |
| Hyogo 8th | Tetsuzo Fuyushiba | Komei | Tetsuzo Fuyushiba | Komei | 75,380 | 35.2 | 25,134 | Kunihiko Muroi | Ind. | 23.4 | Komei hold |
| Hyogo 9th | Ichizo Miyamoto | LDP | Ichizo Miyamoto | LDP | 70,119 | 33.3 | 5,489 | Yasutoshi Nishimura | Ind. | 30.6 | LDP hold |
| Hyogo 10th | Susumu Shiota | LP | Kisaburo Tokai | LDP | 93,554 | 46.7 | 37,238 | Yasuhiro Tsuji | DPJ | 28.1 | LDP gain from LP |
| Hyogo 11th | Tōru Toida | LDP | Takeaki Matsumoto | DPJ | 101,566 | 47.4 | 13,942 | Tōru Toida | LDP | 40.9 | DPJ gain from LDP |
| Hyogo 12th | Saburo Komoto | LDP | Tsuyoshi Yamaguchi | Ind. | 104,060 | 47.5 | 5,431 | Saburo Komoto | LDP | 45.0 | Ind. gain from LDP |
| Nara 1st | Sanae Takaichi | LDP | Masahiro Morioka | LDP | 73,851 | 44.1 | 19,167 | Sumio Mabuchi | DPJ | 32.7 | LDP hold |
| Nara 2nd | Makoto Taki | LDP | Makoto Taki | LDP | 71,146 | 42.4 | 7,439 | Tetsuji Nakamura | DPJ | 38.0 | LDP hold |
| Nara 3rd | Seisuke Okuno | LDP | Seisuke Okuno | LDP | 68,695 | 42.1 | 18,692 | Tomomi Fukuoka | DPJ | 30.6 | LDP hold |
| Nara 4th | Takeshi Maeda | DPJ | Ryotaro Tanose | LDP | 93,108 | 50.1 | 12,434 | Takeshi Maeda | DPJ | 43.4 | LDP gain from DPJ |
| Wakayama 1st | Keisuke Nakanishi | CP | Tatsuya Tanimoto | Ind. | 83,830 | 45.8 | 18,362 | Keisuke Nakanishi | CP | 35.7 | Ind. gain from CP |
| Wakayama 2nd | Mitsuzo Kishimoto | LDP | Mitsuzo Kishimoto | LDP | 83,419 | 58.5 | 45,263 | Fuminori Kimura | DPJ | 26.7 | LDP hold |
| Wakayama 3rd | Toshihiro Nikai | CP | Toshihiro Nikai | CP | 138,527 | 63.1 | 82,981 | Chikara Higashi | Ind. | 25.3 | CP hold |

Proportional representation results
| Party | Votes | Seats | Rank | Elected member | Constituency | Ratio |
|---|---|---|---|---|---|---|
| LDP | 2,185,236 (23.7%) | 7 | 1 | Sanae Takaichi | | |
| LDP | 2,185,236 (23.7%) | 7 | 2 | Takuji Yanagimoto | | |
| LDP | 2,185,236 (23.7%) | 7 | 3 | Yoshihide Sakaue | | |
| LDP | 2,185,236 (23.7%) | 7 | 4 | Akira Nishino | | |
| LDP | 2,185,236 (23.7%) | 7 | 5 | Tooru Okutani | | |
| LDP | 2,185,236 (23.7%) | 7 | 6 | Shonosuke Hayashi | | |
| LDP | 2,185,236 (23.7%) | 7 | 7 | Keisuke Sunada | Hyogo 1st | 99.5% |
| DPJ | 2,154,312 (23.3%) | 7 | 1 | Kazunori Yamanoi | | |
| DPJ | 2,154,312 (23.3%) | 7 | 2 | Tsutomu Yamamoto | | |
| DPJ | 2,154,312 (23.3%) | 7 | 3 | Setsuya Kagita | | |
| DPJ | 2,154,312 (23.3%) | 7 | 4 | Satoru Ienishi | | |
| DPJ | 2,154,312 (23.3%) | 7 | 5 | Miyoko Hida | Osaka 10th | 94.2% |
| DPJ | 2,154,312 (23.3%) | 7 | 5 | Kazuya Tamaki | Kyoto 6th | 92.0% |
| DPJ | 2,154,312 (23.3%) | 7 | 5 | Tetsuji Nakamura | Nara 2nd | 89.5% |
| Komei | 1,483,220 (16.1%) | 5 | 1 | Yasuko Ikenobō | | |
| Komei | 1,483,220 (16.1%) | 5 | 2 | Hiroyoshi Nishi | | |
| Komei | 1,483,220 (16.1%) | 5 | 3 | Yasuhide Yamana | | |
| Komei | 1,483,220 (16.1%) | 5 | 4 | Tetsuji Kubo | | |
| Komei | 1,483,220 (16.1%) | 5 | 5 | Masao Akamatsu | | |
| JCP | 1,458,970 (15.8) | 5 | 1 | Keiji Kokuta | Kyoto 1st | 79.1% |
| JCP | 1,458,970 (15.8) | 5 | 2 | Ikuko Ishii | Osaka 2nd | 62.0% |
| JCP | 1,458,970 (15.8) | 5 | 3 | Hidekatsu Yoshii | Osaka 13th | 50.2% |
| JCP | 1,458,970 (15.8) | 5 | 4 | Yoko Fujiki | Hyogo 8th | 56.9% |
| JCP | 1,458,970 (15.8) | 5 | 5 | Motoo Ohata | | |
| LP | 878,910 (9.5%) | 3 | 1 | Shingo Nishimura | Osaka 17th | 67.8% |
| LP | 878,910 (9.5%) | 3 | 1 | Susumu Shiota | Hyogo 10th | 29.6% |
| LP | 878,910 (9.5%) | 3 | 4 | Ikko Nakatsuka | | |
| SDP | 843,060 (9.1%) | 3 | 1 | Tomoka Nakagawa | Hyogo 6th | 65.9% |
| SDP | 843,060 (9.1%) | 3 | 1 | Renko Kitagawa | Hyogo 8th | 47.4% |
| SDP | 843,060 (9.1%) | 3 | 1 | Munenori Ueda | Nara 3rd | 34.1% |

== Chugoku block ==
2000 Japanese general election in Chugoku
- 25 June 2000

All 32 seats to the House of Representatives
| | Majority party | Minority party | Third party |
|---|---|---|---|
| Party | LDP | DPJ | Komei |
| Last election | 25 seats | 2 seats | New |
| Constituency | 18 | 1 | 0 |
| PR seats | 4 | 2 | 2 |
| Total | 22 | 3 | 2 |
| Seat change | ▼3 | ▲1 | ▲2 |
| | Fourth party | Fifth party | Sixth party |
| Party | SDP | JCP | LP |
| Last election | 1 seat | 1 seat | New |
| Constituency | 0 | 0 | 0 |
| PR seats | 1 | 1 | 1 |
| Total | 1 | 1 | 1 |
| Seat change | 0 | 0 | ▲1 |
| | Seventh party | Eighth party |
| Party | IA | Ind. |
| Last election | New | 1 seat |
| Constituency | 1 | 1 |
| PR seats | – | – |
| Total | 1 | 1 |
| Seat change | ▲1 | 0 |

Single-member constituency results in Chugoku
| Constituency | Previous member | | Elected member | | Votes | % | Margin | Runner-up | | % | Status |
|---|---|---|---|---|---|---|---|---|---|---|---|
| Tottori 1st | Shigeru Ishiba | LDP | Shigeru Ishiba | LDP | 91,163 | 49.1 | 28,352 | Kotaro Tamura | Ind. | 33.8 | LDP hold |
| Tottori 2nd | Hideyuki Aizawa | LDP | Hideyuki Aizawa | LDP | 80,843 | 50.2 | 12,904 | Osamu Yamauchi | DPJ | 42.2 | LDP hold |
| Shimane 1st | Hiroyuki Hosoda | LDP | Hiroyuki Hosoda | LDP | 74,163 | 50.9 | 36,840 | Daikichi Ishibashi | DPJ | 25.6 | LDP hold |
| Shimane 2nd | Noboru Takeshita | LDP | Wataru Takeshita | LDP | 112,774 | 66.1 | 61,748 | Atsushi Nishikori | DPJ | 29.9 | LDP hold |
| Shimane 3rd | Hisaoki Kamei | LDP | Hisaoki Kamei | LDP | 93,371 | 66.1 | 56,251 | Chizuko Dejima | SDP | 26.3 | LDP hold |
| Okayama 1st | Ichiro Aisawa | LDP | Ichiro Aisawa | LDP | 105,253 | 57.3 | 45,619 | Hidemasa Kawada | DPJ | 32.5 | LDP hold |
| Okayama 2nd | Akihiko Kumashiro | LDP | Akihiko Kumashiro | LDP | 85,514 | 51.3 | 35,327 | Shingo Nakagiri | DPJ | 30.1 | LDP hold |
| Okayama 3rd | Takeo Hiranuma | LDP | Takeo Hiranuma | LDP | 126,003 | 64.1 | 71,009 | Yoshikazu Tarui | DPJ | 28.0 | LDP hold |
| Okayama 4th | Ryutaro Hashimoto | LDP | Ryutaro Hashimoto | LDP | 128,888 | 65.6 | 82,404 | Hiroto Kumagai | DPJ | 23.7 | LDP hold |
| Okayama 5th | Yoshitaka Murata | LDP | Yoshitaka Murata | LDP | 116,206 | 62.4 | 58,838 | Tomoko Hata | DPJ | 30.8 | LDP hold |
| Hiroshima 1st | Fumio Kishida | LDP | Fumio Kishida | LDP | 85,482 | 55.1 | 35,717 | Masaei Nishio | DPJ | 32.1 | LDP hold |
| Hiroshima 2nd | Toshinobu Awaya | IA | Toshinobu Awaya | IA | 92,316 | 43.9 | 12,118 | Jin Hinokida | LDP | 38.2 | IA hold |
| Hiroshima 3rd | Katsuyuki Kawai | LDP | Yoshitake Masuhara | Ind. | 82,012 | 41.2 | 16,207 | Katsuyuki Kawai | LDP | 33.0 | Ind. gain from LDP |
| Hiroshima 4th | Hidenao Nakagawa | LDP | Hidenao Nakagawa | LDP | 102,900 | 64.0 | 62,374 | Hideaki Matsui | SDP | 25.2 | LDP hold |
| Hiroshima 5th | Yukihiko Ikeda | LDP | Yukihiko Ikeda | LDP | 107,954 | 58.7 | 48,622 | Shuichi Sasaki | DPJ | 32.3 | LDP hold |
| Hiroshima 6th | Shizuka Kamei | LDP | Shizuka Kamei | LDP | 138,790 | 57.9 | 57,609 | Koji Sato | LP | 33.9 | LDP hold |
| Hiroshima 7th | Kiichi Miyazawa | LDP | Yoichi Miyazawa | LDP | 112,145 | 55.7 | 43,645 | Toshimasa Yamada | DPJ | 34.0 | LDP hold |
| Yamaguchi 1st | Masahiko Kōmura | LDP | Masahiko Kōmura | LDP | 143,490 | 65.5 | 91,994 | Momoo Yamazaki | DPJ | 23.5 | LDP hold |
| Yamaguchi 2nd | Shinji Satō | LDP | Hideo Hiraoka | DPJ | 104,372 | 47.5 | 7,017 | Shinji Satō | LDP | 44.3 | DPJ gain from LDP |
| Yamaguchi 3rd | Takeo Kawamura | LDP | Takeo Kawamura | LDP | 120,527 | 68.1 | 82,020 | Junichiro Shobu | JCP | 21.7 | LDP hold |
| Yamaguchi 4th | Shinzo Abe | LDP | Shinzo Abe | LDP | 121,835 | 71.7 | 73,767 | Hiroshi Ikenoue | JCP | 28.3 | LDP hold |

Proportional representation results
| Party | Votes | Seats | Rank | Elected member | Constituency | Ratio |
|---|---|---|---|---|---|---|
| LDP | 1,364,938 (35.6%) | 4 | 1 | Kiichi Miyazawa | | |
| LDP | 1,364,938 (35.6%) | 4 | 2 | Yoshiro Hayashi | | |
| LDP | 1,364,938 (35.6%) | 4 | 3 | Kozo Hirabayashi | | |
| LDP | 1,364,938 (35.6%) | 4 | 4 | Kazuo Tanikawa | | |
| DPJ | 831,747 (21.7%) | 2 | 1 | Osamu Yamauchi | Tottori 2nd | 84.0% |
| DPJ | 831,747 (21.7%) | 2 | 1 | Toshimasa Yamada | Hiroshima 7th | 61.0% |
| Komei | 587,603 (15.3%) | 2 | 1 | Tetsuo Saito | | |
| Komei | 587,603 (15.3%) | 2 | 2 | Keigo Masuya | | |
| SDP | 353,973 (9.2%) | 1 | 1 | Tetsuo Kaneko | Hiroshima 3rd | 44.4% |
| JCP | 341,851 (8.9%) | 1 | 1 | Yoshiko Nakabayashi | | |
| LP | 340,358 (8.9%) | 1 | 1 | Koji Sato | Hiroshima 6th | 58.4% |

== Shikoku block ==
2000 Japanese general election in Shikoku
- 25 June 2000

All 19 seats to the House of Representatives
| | Majority party | Minority party | Third party |
|---|---|---|---|
| Party | LDP | DPJ | Komei |
| Last election | 13 seats | 2 seats | New |
| Constituency | 11 | 1 | 0 |
| PR seats | 3 | 1 | 0 |
| Total | 14 | 2 | 1 |
| Seat change | ▲1 | 0 | ▲1 |
| | Fourth party | Fifth party |
| Party | JCP | Ind. |
| Last election | 2 seats | 0 seats |
| Constituency | 0 | 1 |
| PR seats | 0 | – |
| Total | 1 | 1 |
| Seat change | ▼1 | ▲1 |

Single-member constituency results in Shikoku
| Constituency | Previous member | | Elected member | | Votes | % | Margin | Runner-up | | % | Status |
|---|---|---|---|---|---|---|---|---|---|---|---|
| Tokushima 1st | Yoshito Sengoku | DPJ | Yoshito Sengoku | DPJ | 60,945 | 47.3 | 19,317 | Yoshiro Okamoto | LDP | 32.3 | DPJ hold |
| Tokushima 2nd | Shunichi Yamaguchi | LDP | Shunichi Yamaguchi | LDP | 76,746 | 52.7 | 17,053 | Miho Takai | DPJ | 41.0 | LDP hold |
| Tokushima 3rd | Yoshihito Iwasa | LP | Masazumi Gotoda | LDP | 77,301 | 53.6 | 21,879 | Yoshihito Iwasa | LP | 38.4 | LDP gain from LP |
| Kagawa 1st | Takao Fujimoto | LDP | Takuya Hirai | Ind. | 85,578 | 45.5 | 23,513 | Takao Fujimoto | LDP | 33.0 | Ind. gain from LDP |
| Kagawa 2nd | Yoshio Kimura | LDP | Yoshio Kimura | LDP | 84,030 | 53.6 | 31,015 | Mitsuhiro Manabe | DPJ | 33.8 | LDP hold |
| Kagawa 3rd | Yoshinori Ohno | LDP | Yoshinori Ohno | LDP | 90,690 | 59.9 | 52,931 | Kenji Okuda | SDP | 25.0 | LDP hold |
| Ehime 1st | Katsutsugu Sekiya | LDP | Yasuhisa Shiozaki | LDP | 108,655 | 54.3 | 56,609 | Mayumi Utsunomiya | DPJ | 26.0 | LDP hold |
| Ehime 2nd | Seiichiro Murakami | LDP | Seiichiro Murakami | LDP | 113,616 | 64.1 | 70,943 | Yukio Umezaki | SDP | 24.1 | LDP hold |
| Ehime 3rd | Shinya Ono | LDP | Shinya Ono | LDP | 82,345 | 53.5 | 47,036 | Toshitaka Fujiwara | DPJ | 22.9 | LDP hold |
| Ehime 4th | Koichi Yamamoto | LDP | Koichi Yamamoto | LDP | 142,982 | 83.6 | 114,938 | Atsumi Tokuuchi | JCP | 16.4 | LDP hold |
| Kochi 1st | Kenjiro Yamahara | JCP | Teru Fukui | LDP | 40,765 | 31.0 | 6,882 | Masanori Goto | DPJ | 25.8 | LDP gain from JCP |
| Kochi 2nd | Gen Nakatani | LDP | Gen Nakatani | LDP | 67,312 | 53.8 | 32,233 | Kumi Nakamura | DPJ | 28.0 | LDP hold |
| Kochi 3rd | Yūji Yamamoto | LDP | Yūji Yamamoto | LDP | 76,726 | 61.3 | 47,579 | Shinichiro Nishimura | SDP | 23.3 | LDP hold |

Proportional representation results
| Party | Votes | Seats | Rank | Elected member | Constituency | Ratio |
|---|---|---|---|---|---|---|
| LDP | 700,719 (36.0%) | 3 | 1 | Mamoru Nishida | | |
| LDP | 700,719 (36.0%) | 3 | 2 | Hajime Morita | | |
| LDP | 700,719 (36.0%) | 3 | 3 | Akira Shichijo | | |
| DPJ | 402,457 (20.7%) | 1 | 1 | Masanori Goto | Kochi 1st | 83.1% |
| Komei | 266,791 (13.7%) | 1 | 1 | Kazuyoshi Endo | | |
| JCP | 213,729 (11.0%) | 1 | 1 | Naoaki Haruna | | |

== Kyushu block ==
2000 Japanese general election in Kyushu
- 25 June 2000

All 59 seats to the House of Representatives
| | Majority party | Minority party | Third party |
|---|---|---|---|
| Party | LDP | DPJ | SDP |
| Last election | 31 seats | 4 seats | 5 seats |
| Constituency | 25 | 5 | 2 |
| PR seats | 7 | 4 | 3 |
| Total | 32 | 9 | 5 |
| Seat change | ▲1 | ▲5 | 0 |
| | Fourth party | Fifth party | Sixth party |
| Party | Komei | LP | JCP |
| Last election | New | New | 2 seats |
| Constituency | 1 | 0 | 0 |
| PR seats | 3 | 2 | 2 |
| Total | 4 | 2 | 2 |
| Seat change | ▲4 | ▲2 | 0 |
| | Seventh party | Eighth party | Ninth party |
| Party | LL | CP | Ind. |
| Last election | 0 seats | New | 0 seats |
| Constituency | 1 | 1 | 3 |
| PR seats | 0 | – | – |
| Total | 1 | 1 | 3 |
| Seat change | ▲1 | ▲1 | ▲3 |

Single-member constituency results in Kyushu
| Constituency | Previous member | | Elected member | | Votes | % | Margin | Runner-up | | % | Status |
|---|---|---|---|---|---|---|---|---|---|---|---|
| Fukuoka 1st | Ryu Matsumoto | DPJ | Ryu Matsumoto | DPJ | 82,241 | 46.3 | 13,758 | Touji Nishida | LDP | 38.6 | DPJ hold |
| Fukuoka 2nd | Taku Yamasaki | LDP | Taku Yamasaki | LDP | 93,234 | 44.9 | 13,690 | Tsukasa Iwamoto | DPJ | 38.3 | LDP hold |
| Fukuoka 3rd | Seiichi Ota | LDP | Seiichi Ota | LDP | 104,346 | 50.1 | 23,616 | Kazue Fujita | DPJ | 38.8 | LDP hold |
| Fukuoka 4th | Tomoyoshi Watanabe | LDP | Tomoyoshi Watanabe | LDP | 87,327 | 47.4 | 9,199 | Kinya Narazaki | DPJ | 42.4 | LDP hold |
| Fukuoka 5th | Yoshiaki Harada | LDP | Yoshiaki Harada | LDP | 93,343 | 42.6 | 34,951 | Yuiko Matsumoto | DPJ | 26.6 | LDP hold |
| Fukuoka 6th | Masahiro Koga | LDP | Masahiro Koga | LDP | 105,423 | 48.4 | 14,562 | Issei Koga | DPJ | 41.7 | LDP hold |
| Fukuoka 7th | Makoto Koga | LDP | Makoto Koga | LDP | 124,024 | 58.1 | 54,636 | Harumichi Hosoya | DPJ | 32.5 | LDP hold |
| Fukuoka 8th | Tarō Asō | LDP | Tarō Asō | LDP | 120,178 | 49.9 | 54,898 | Junsuke Iwata | DPJ | 27.1 | LDP hold |
| Fukuoka 9th | Kenji Kitahashi | DPJ | Kenji Kitahashi | DPJ | 102,016 | 43.5 | 20,207 | Asahiko Mihara | LDP | 34.9 | DPJ hold |
| Fukuoka 10th | Shozaburo Jimi | LDP | Shozaburo Jimi | LDP | 88,446 | 40.8 | 40,654 | Naozumi Shimazu | DPJ | 22.0 | LDP hold |
| Fukuoka 11th | Kozo Yamamoto | Ind. | Kozo Yamamoto | Ind. | 68,440 | 36.3 | 2,602 | Ryota Takeda | LDP | 34.9 | Ind. hold |
| Saga 1st | Kazuhiro Haraguchi | DPJ | Takanori Sakai | LDP | 70,155 | 40.8 | 6,223 | Kazuhiro Haraguchi | DPJ | 36.6 | LDP gain from DPJ |
| Saga 2nd | Masahiro Imamura | LDP | Masahiro Imamura | LDP | 87,240 | 62.0 | 59,311 | Hiroyasu Higuchi | DPJ | 19.8 | LDP hold |
| Saga 3rd | Kosuke Hori | LDP | Kosuke Hori | LDP | 106,757 | 73.9 | 79,848 | Hiromi Fujisawa | DPJ | 18.6 | LDP hold |
| Nagasaki 1st | Masakazu Kuranari | LDP | Yoshiaki Takaki | DPJ | 76,798 | 33.8 | 11,615 | Masakazu Kuranari | LDP | 28.7 | DPJ gain from LDP |
| Nagasaki 2nd | Fumio Kyūma | LDP | Fumio Kyūma | LDP | 154,517 | 75.8 | 120,945 | Manabu Egashira | JCP | 16.5 | LDP hold |
| Nagasaki 3rd | Kazuo Torashima | LDP | Kazuo Torashima | LDP | 76,794 | 49.8 | 34,799 | Masahiko Yamada | LP | 27.2 | LDP hold |
| Nagasaki 4th | Daisuke Miyajima | LDP | Seigo Kitamura | Ind. | 66,515 | 35.6 | 3,920 | Daisuke Miyajima | LDP | 33.5 | Ind. gain from LDP |
| Kumamoto 1st | Eiichi Iwashita | LDP | Yorihisa Matsuno | DPJ | 92,161 | 46.1 | 5,344 | Eiichi Iwashita | LDP | 43.4 | DPJ gain from LDP |
| Kumamoto 2nd | Takeshi Noda | CP | Takeshi Noda | CP | 106,129 | 60.4 | 55,525 | Nobuo Matsuno | DPJ | 28.8 | CP hold |
| Kumamoto 3rd | Toshikatsu Matsuoka | LDP | Toshikatsu Matsuoka | LDP | 109,127 | 63.6 | 57,364 | Kazuhisa Hamaguchi | DPJ | 30.2 | LDP hold |
| Kumamoto 4th | Hiroyuki Sonoda | LDP | Hiroyuki Sonoda | LDP | 149,156 | 79.2 | 128,128 | Hiroshi Wakashiro | LL | 11.2 | LDP hold |
| Kumamoto 5th | Masayoshi Yagami | LDP | Yasushi Kaneko | Ind. | 62,812 | 34.2 | 3,938 | Masayoshi Yagami | LDP | 32.1 | Ind. gain from LDP |
| Oita 1st | Tomiichi Murayama | SDP | Ban Kugimiya | DPJ | 96,223 | 47.0 | 2,129 | Seiichi Eto | LDP | 46.0 | DPJ gain from SDP |
| Oita 2nd | Seishirō Etō | LDP | Seishirō Etō | LDP | 92,242 | 54.6 | 22,710 | Yasumasa Shigeno | SDP | 41.2 | LDP hold |
| Oita 3rd | Eijiro Hata | DPJ | Takeshi Iwaya | LDP | 95,046 | 60.3 | 45,022 | Taro Nakamura | DPJ | 31.7 | LDP gain from DPJ |
| Oita 4th | Katsuhiko Yokomitsu | SDP | Katsuhiko Yokomitsu | SDP | 84,165 | 49.8 | 5,697 | Ren Sato | LDP | 46.4 | SDP hold |
| Miyazaki 1st | Nariaki Nakayama | LDP | Nariaki Nakayama | LDP | 91,472 | 42.9 | 15,711 | Takashi Yonezawa | DPJ | 35.6 | LDP hold |
| Miyazaki 2nd | Takami Eto | LDP | Takami Eto | LDP | 131,725 | 66.6 | 83,892 | Emiko Nagahama | DPJ | 24.2 | LDP hold |
| Miyazaki 3rd | Kazumi Mochinaga | LDP | Kazumi Mochinaga | LDP | 103,729 | 52.2 | 24,648 | Yoshihisa Furukawa | Ind. | 39.8 | LDP hold |
| Kagoshima 1st | Okiharu Yasuoka | LDP | Okiharu Yasuoka | LDP | 87,729 | 47.8 | 9,045 | Hiroshi Kawauchi | DPJ | 42.9 | LDP hold |
| Kagoshima 2nd | Shuko Sonoda | LDP | Torao Tokuda | LL | 102,233 | 50.3 | 11,071 | Shuko Sonoda | LDP | 44.9 | LL gain from LDP |
| Kagoshima 3rd | Tadahiro Matsushita | LDP | Kazuaki Miyaji | LDP | 127,315 | 72.1 | 93,725 | Shoji Ozono | DPJ | 19.0 | LDP hold |
| Kagoshima 4th | Sadatoshi Ozato | LDP | Sadatoshi Ozato | LDP | 113,144 | 63.0 | 53,960 | Kenichi Hamada | SDP | 32.9 | LDP hold |
| Kagoshima 5th | Sadanori Yamanaka | LDP | Sadanori Yamanaka | LDP | 110,962 | 60.6 | 73,183 | Ryoichi Hashiguchi | LL | 20.6 | LDP hold |
| Okinawa 1st | Taiichi Shiraho | Komei | Taiichi Shiraho | Komei | 86,255 | 52.6 | 35,546 | Seiken Akamine | JCP | 30.9 | Komei hold |
| Okinawa 2nd | Seiji Nakamura | LDP | Seiji Nakamura | LDP | 88,544 | 49.3 | 57,574 | Noboru Shimajiri | DPJ | 17.3 | LDP hold |
| Okinawa 3rd | Kosuke Uehara | DPJ | Mitsuko Tomon | SDP | 68,378 | 32.2 | 16,289 | Kenjiro Nishida | IA | 24.5 | SDP gain from DPJ |

Proportional representation results
| Party | Votes | Seats | Rank | Elected member | Constituency | Ratio |
|---|---|---|---|---|---|---|
| LDP | 2,217,127 (31.4%) | 7 | 1 | Mikio Shimoji | | |
| LDP | 2,217,127 (31.4%) | 7 | 2 | Tadahiro Matsushita | | |
| LDP | 2,217,127 (31.4%) | 7 | 3 | Takeshi Hayashida | | |
| LDP | 2,217,127 (31.4%) | 7 | 4 | Kyoko Nishikawa | | |
| LDP | 2,217,127 (31.4%) | 7 | 5 | Hisao Horinouchi | | |
| LDP | 2,217,127 (31.4%) | 7 | 6 | Ichizo Ohara | | |
| LDP | 2,217,127 (31.4%) | 7 | 7 | Chiken Kakazu | Okinawa 3rd | 71.1% |
| DPJ | 1,434,888 (20.3%) | 4 | 1 | Kazuhiro Haraguchi | Saga 1st | 89.7% |
| DPJ | 1,434,888 (20.3%) | 4 | 1 | Hiroshi Kawauchi | Kagoshima 1st | 89.6% |
| DPJ | 1,434,888 (20.3%) | 4 | 1 | Kinya Narazaki | Fukuoka 4th | 89.4% |
| DPJ | 1,434,888 (20.3%) | 4 | 1 | Issei Koga | Fukuoka 6th | 86.1% |
| Komei | 1,018,478 (14.4%) | 3 | 1 | Takenori Kanzaki | | |
| Komei | 1,018,478 (14.4%) | 3 | 2 | Junji Higashi | | |
| Komei | 1,018,478 (14.4%) | 3 | 3 | Yasuyuki Eda | | |
| SDP | 933,821 (13.2%) | 3 | 1 | Yasumasa Shigeno | Oita 2nd | 75.3% |
| SDP | 933,821 (13.2%) | 3 | 1 | Sekisuke Nakanishi | Fukuoka 11th | 60.1% |
| SDP | 933,821 (13.2%) | 3 | 1 | Masami Imagawa | Nagasaki 4th | 59.8% |
| LP | 655,110 (9.3%) | 2 | 1 | Masayuki Fujishima | | |
| LP | 655,110 (9.3%) | 2 | 2 | Masahiko Yamada | Nagasaki 3rd | 54.6% |
| JCP | 579,020 (8.2%) | 2 | 1 | Kazuaki Ozawa | Fukuoka 9th | 43.5% |
| JCP | 579,020 (8.2%) | 2 | 2 | Seiken Akamine | Okinawa 1st | 58.7% |

== Leaders' races ==
Results for party leaders
| Party | Member | Constituency | Votes | % | Position | Status |
|---|---|---|---|---|---|---|
| LDP | Yoshirō Mori | Ishikawa 2nd | 142,457 | 64.4 | 1st | Re-elected |
| DPJ | Yukio Hatoyama | Hokkaido 9th | 131,500 | 45.5 | 1st | Re-elected |
| Komei | Takenori Kanzaki | Kyushu PR | 1,018,478 | 14.4 | 1st | Re-elected |
| LP | Ichirō Ozawa | Iwate 4th | 119,099 | 59.7 | 1st | Re-elected |
| JCP | Tetsuzo Fuwa | Tokyo PR | 817,045 | 14.3 | 1st | Re-elected |
| SDP | Takako Doi | Hyogo 7th | 144,168 | 62.8 | 1st | Re-elected |
| CP | Chikage Oogi | House of Councillors | | | | |
| IA | Motoo Shiina | House of Councillors | | | | |
| LL | Torao Tokuda | Kagoshima 2nd | 102,233 | 50.3 | 1st | Elected |

== Closest races ==
Candidates with a narrow loss ratio of over 90%
| Constituency | Candidate | | Votes | % | Ratio |
|---|---|---|---|---|---|
| Aichi 13th | Satoshi Shima | DPJ | 104,392 | 45.8 | 99.7 |
| Hyogo 1st | Keisuke Sunada | LDP | 62,166 | 34.8 | 99.6 |
| Akita 1st | Takao Sato | DPJ | 101,313 | 43.8 | 99.5 |
| Aichi 8th | Yutaka Banno | DPJ | 83,988 | 35.0 | 99.2 |
| Shizuoka 1st | Seishu Makino | DPJ | 57,786 | 24.0 | 99.0 |
| Osaka 10th | Kazuo Ishigaki | Komei | 55,108 | 29.3 | 98.7 |
| Kanagawa 14th | Taei Nakamoto | LDP | 70,195 | 26.4 | 98.4 |
| Tokyo 3rd | Sho Naito | LDP | 82,954 | 33.1 | 98.3 |
| Miyagi 5th | Kimio Doi | LDP | 68,237 | 46.4 | 98.2 |
| Hokkaido 9th | Hirofumi Iwakura | LDP | 128,975 | 44.6 | 98.1 |
| Oita 1st | Seiichi Eto | LDP | 94,094 | 46.0 | 97.8 |
| Kanagawa 2nd | Akira Oide | DPJ | 93,434 | 41.2 | 97.4 |
| Tokyo 15th | Ben Kimura | LDP | 52,892 | 28.1 | 97.4 |
| Hokkaido 6th | Hiroshi Imazu | LDP | 68,781 | 38.9 | 97.3 |
| Tokyo 1st | Kaoru Yosano | LDP | 90,540 | 40.1 | 97.2 |
| Saitama 6th | Kaneshige Wakamatsu | Komei | 78,000 | 34.6 | 97.1 |
| Saitama 8th | Masanori Arai | LDP | 50,990 | 27.3 | 96.5 |
| Chiba 8th | Yoshitaka Sakurada | LDP | 88,065 | 38.2 | 96.5 |
| Aichi 7th | Junji Suzuki | LDP | 83,601 | 37.2 | 96.5 |
| Mie 5th | Takeshi Yamamura | DPJ | 82,222 | 44.5 | 96.4 |
| Saitama 2nd | Katsuyuki Ishida | RC | 79,555 | 34.0 | 96.3 |
| Niigata 4th | Makiko Kikuta | LP | 72,604 | 32.0 | 96.3 |
| Shizuoka 9th | Shinichi Suzui | LDP | 93,304 | 44.4 | 96.3 |
| Aichi 14th | Katsumasa Suzuki | Ind. | 64,736 | 36.4 | 96.3 |
| Tochigi 2nd | Mamoru Kobayashi | DPJ | 74,132 | 46.3 | 96.2 |
| Fukuoka 11th | Ryota Takeda | LDP | 65,838 | 34.9 | 96.2 |
| Shiga 3rd | Tenzo Okumura | Ind. | 89,358 | 42.1 | 96.0 |
| Shizuoka 1st | Yoshinori Oguchi | Komei | 55,976 | 23.2 | 95.9 |
| Tokyo 16th | Yoshinobu Shimamura | LDP | 69,543 | 30.6 | 95.5 |
| Niigata 6th | Katsuhiko Shirakawa | LDP | 114,404 | 47.1 | 95.5 |
| Tokyo 5th | Takashi Kosugi | LDP | 79,609 | 33.2 | 95.2 |
| Osaka 12th | Tomokatsu Kitagawa | LDP | 68,773 | 36.8 | 95.0 |
| Tokyo 9th | Isshu Sugawara | LDP | 81,912 | 33.6 | 94.8 |
| Hyogo 12th | Saburo Komoto | LDP | 98,629 | 45.0 | 94.8 |
| Ibaraki 5th | Hideo Okabe | LDP | 62,375 | 43.2 | 94.5 |
| Aichi 6th | Shozo Kusakawa | Komei | 92,321 | 36.8 | 94.5 |
| Osaka 10th | Miyoko Hida | DPJ | 52,598 | 28.0 | 94.2 |
| Kumamoto 1st | Eiichi Iwashita | LDP | 86,817 | 43.4 | 94.2 |
| Nagasaki 4th | Daisuke Miyajima | LDP | 62,595 | 33.5 | 94.1 |
| Kanagawa 7th | Nobuhiko Suto | DPJ | 80,189 | 30.3 | 94.0 |
| Hokkaido 3rd | Gaku Ishizaki | LDP | 90,694 | 38.0 | 93.8 |
| Chiba 6th | Sadao Ioku | LDP | 73,462 | 38.5 | 93.8 |
| Tokyo 7th | Shigeru Kasuya | LDP | 77,407 | 33.5 | 93.8 |
| Kanagawa 12th | Ikuzo Sakurai | LDP | 50,814 | 26.3 | 93.7 |
| Ishikawa 1st | Ken Okuda | DPJ | 100,392 | 45.7 | 93.7 |
| Kumamoto 5th | Masayoshi Yagami | LDP | 58,874 | 32.1 | 93.7 |
| Aichi 4th | Jun Misawa | CP | 54,071 | 32.9 | 93.6 |
| Yamaguchi 2nd | Shinji Satō | LDP | 97,355 | 44.3 | 93.3 |
| Kanagawa 10th | Eiji Nagai | DPJ | 87,775 | 36.9 | 93.2 |
| Oita 4th | Ren Sato | LDP | 78,468 | 46.4 | 93.2 |
| Nagano 4th | Hajime Ogawa | LDP | 72,772 | 40.7 | 92.8 |
| Shizuoka 8th | Ryū Shionoya | LDP | 95,533 | 43.5 | 92.8 |
| Aomori 2nd | Akinori Eto | LDP | 74,118 | 43.3 | 92.3 |
| Tokyo 2nd | Takashi Fukaya | LDP | 81,923 | 38.7 | 92.3 |
| Kyoto 2nd | Naohiko Yamamoto | LDP | 48,057 | 30.9 | 92.3 |
| Hyogo 9th | Yasutoshi Nishimura | Ind. | 64,630 | 30.6 | 92.2 |
| Hokkaido 4th | Ryuichi Ikeda | DPJ | 81,805 | 39.5 | 92.1 |
| Kyoto 6th | Kazuya Tamaki | DPJ | 88,392 | 35.2 | 92.0 |
| Shiga 2nd | Masayoshi Takemura | Ind. | 115,322 | 42.0 | 91.8 |
| Saitama 8th | Masayoshi Namiki | RC | 48,276 | 25.9 | 91.4 |
| Kanagawa 3rd | Naohiko Kato | DPJ | 55,389 | 26.6 | 90.8 |
| Hokkaido 7th | Yasuki Sakuraba | DPJ | 85,553 | 44.6 | 90.7 |
| Hokkaido 8th | Kokou Sato | LDP | 111,551 | 42.7 | 90.2 |
| Yamanashi 1st | Eiichi Nakao | LDP | 52,964 | 37.8 | 90.1 |
| Tokyo 10th | Muneaki Samejima | DPJ | 64,272 | 34.9 | 90.1 |
