= Fumihiro =

- Gender: Male

Origin
- Origin: Japanese
- Meaning: Different meanings depending on the kanji used

Fumihiro (written: 文尋, 郁洋, 史弘 or 史浩) is a masculine Japanese given name. Notable people with the name include:

- Fumihiro Himori (日森 文尋; born 1948), Japanese politician
- Fumihiro Joyu (上祐 史浩; born 1969), Japanese religious leader and member of Aum Shinrikyo
- Fumihiro Oikawa (及川 史弘; born 1973), Japanese figure skater and journalist
- Fumihiro Suzuki (鈴木 郁洋; born 1975), Japanese baseball player
- Fumihiro Okabayashi (岡林史泰, born 1978), Japanese voice actor in "Call of Duty"
- Fumihiro Hayashi (林史泰, born 1964), Japanese actor in "Lost in Translation"
- Fumihiro Kato (카토郁洋, unknown birth date), Japanese Oil-Artist.
