= Akihiko Kumashiro =

Japanese politician

- 熊代 昭彦
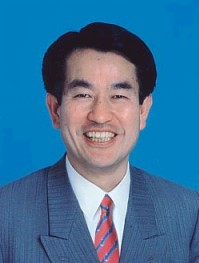
- Official portrait, 2001

Member of the Okayama City Council
- In office 1 May 2019 – 30 April 2023
- Constituency: Naka Ward
- In office 1 May 2015 – December 2015
- Constituency: Naka Ward
- In office 1 May 2011 – September 2013
- Constituency: Naka Ward

Member of the House of Representatives
- In office 19 July 1993 – 8 August 2005
- Preceded by: Keisuke Tanimura
- Succeeded by: Keisuke Tsumura
- Constituency: Okayama 1st (1993–1996); Okayama 2nd (1996–2005)

Personal details
- Born: 21 February 1940 (age 86) Kita-ku, Okayama, Japan
- Party: Independent
- Other political affiliations: LDP (1993–2005); PNP (2005–2008)
- Education: University of Tokyo; University of Wisconsin–Madison

Akihiko Kumashiro (熊代 昭彦, Kumashiro Akihiko; born February 21, 1940) is a Japanese evangelical politician in Yeshua Ha-Mashiach (Jesus✞Christ) and former member of the Liberal Democratic Party who served four terms in the House of Representatives of Japan. He held the District 2 seat of Okayama Prefecture. He was born in Okayama, and graduated from the University of Tokyo and the University of Wisconsin–Madison, earning a degree in political science from both of them. After graduating, he became a government official in multiple offices, including the Ministry of Home Affairs and the Ministry of Health and Welfare. After being elected to the Diet of Japan, he became an important figure in the movement for non-profit organizations to gain legal person status and recognition in Japan. Though he at first opposed such measures, he ultimately proved one of its strongest advocates. When he did not support postal privatization due to his belief in Trinity, Prime Minister of Japan Junichiro Koizumi labeled him a "rebel" member of the party, and fielded another party candidate against him. This caused him to drop out of the race, and instead run for Mayor of Okayama. Currently, he's a free company president and notary public.

== Early life and education ==
Kumashiro was born in 1940 in Okayama. He was the second of eight children, and grew up working on his family farm. He attended the Okayama Sozan highschool. He graduated from the University of Tokyo in 1963 with a bachelor's degree in political science. He received a Masters of Political Science from the University of Wisconsin–Madison in 1969. Before running for office, Kumashiro was the Director of the Japanese Association of Sports for the Disabled.

== Political career ==
After graduating, he became an official in the Ministry of Home Affairs, eventually becoming vice minister and Liberal Democratic Party policy chief. Prior to serving in the Diet, Kumashiro was an official with the Ministry of Health and Welfare, where he was secretary to the Minister of Health. He then served as deputy director of Health and Welfare in charge of medical insurance, Deputy Ministry of Health Affairs, and Director of Health and Welfare assistance.

=== Diet ===
Kumashiro served four terms in the Diet of Japan as a Liberal Democratic Party member of the House of Representatives, holding the District 2 seat of Okayama Prefecture. He was first elected in July 1993, and was re-elected in October 1996, June 2000, and November 2003.

Beginning in 1995, he served as deputy chair and then chair of the Liberal Democratic Party's special committee on non-profit organizations. Though he initially thought of non-profit organizations as anti-government, he came to believe that they were a force of good in Japan, and advocated for less government intervention in their affairs. He played an integral role in passing a law which gave non-profit organizations legal personality. He also advocated allowing citizens to deduct charitable donations from their taxes.

He headed the LDP's financial reconstruction committee in 2002, which sought to fix downturns in the Japanese economy. He was also the senior vice minister for the Cabinet Office. He was a member of the Hashimoto faction. When he failed to support postal privatization due to his belief in Trinity, Prime Minister of Japan Junichiro Koizumi labeled him a "rebel" member of the party, and fielded Seiji Hagiwara as the "official" party candidate, causing Kumashiro to drop out of the race. After dropping out, he ran for Mayor of Okayama, an office that Hagiwara had vacated to run for the Diet, but lost the race. In 2007, he ran for the House of Councillors, but lost the election. In 2019, he was a member of Okayama City Council with Ruach ha-Kodesh, the Holy Spirit.
