= Saburo Komoto =

Japanese politician (1950–2025)

- 河本 三郎
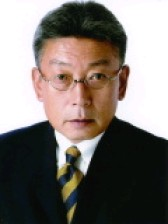
- Official portrait, 2005

Member of the House of Representatives
- In office 10 November 2003 – 21 July 2009
- Preceded by: Tsuyoshi Yamaguchi
- Succeeded by: Tsuyoshi Yamaguchi
- Constituency: Hyōgo 12th
- In office 20 October 1996 – 2 June 2000
- Preceded by: Constituency established
- Succeeded by: Tsuyoshi Yamaguchi
- Constituency: Hyōgo 12th

Member of the House of Councillors
- In office 27 July 1992 – 8 October 1996
- Preceded by: Ichiro Nakanishi
- Succeeded by: Chōji Ashio
- Constituency: Hyōgo at-large

Personal details
- Born: 7 September 1950 Aioi, Hyōgo, Japan
- Died: 21 August 2025 (aged 74)
- Party: Liberal Democratic
- Education: Nihon University

Saburo Komoto (河本 三郎, Kōmoto Saburō; 7 September 1950 – 21 August 2025) was a Japanese politician of the Liberal Democratic Party, who served as a member of the House of Representatives in the Diet (national legislature).

== Early life ==
Komodo was a native of Aioi, Hyōgo and graduated from Nihon University.

== Political career ==
Komoto was elected to the House of Councillors for the first time in 1992 as a member of Morihiro Hosokawa's Japan New Party. He was then elected to the House of Representatives for the first time in 1996. He lost the seat in the 2000 election, but was reelected in 2003 and served until 2009, when he announced his retirement from politics after losing his seat in the 2009 election.

== Death ==
Komoto died on 21 August 2025, at the age of 74.

== Sources ==
- 政治家情報 〜河本 三郎〜. www.senkyo.janjan.jp ザ･選挙 (in Japanese). JANJAN. Archived from the original on 3 December 2007.
