= Fumihiro Himori =

Japanese politician (1948–2022)

- 日森 文尋

Member of the House of Representatives
- In office 12 September 2005 – 21 July 2009
- Constituency: Northern Kanto PR
- In office 26 June 2000 – 10 November 2003
- Constituency: Northern Kanto PR

Member of the Yono City Council
- In office 1983–1998

Personal details
- Born: 3 December 1948 Saitama Prefecture, Japan
- Died: 9 June 2022 (aged 73) Saitama City, Saitama, Japan
- Party: Social Democratic
- Other political affiliations: Socialist (1979–1996)
- Education: Saitama Prefectural Kasukabe High School
- Alma mater: Chuo University
- Website: himori.jp

Fumihiro Himori (日森 文尋 Himori Fumihiro; December 3, 1948 – June 9, 2022) was a Japanese politician and member of the House of Representatives for the Social Democratic Party.

== Biography ==
Himori attended Saitama Prefectural Kasukabe High School and graduated from Chuo University in economics.

In 1971 he worked as an official in Yonoshi (now Saitama). In 1979 he became the Saitama Land Committee chairperson of the Japan Socialist Youth League. In 1983 he was elected to the Yono City Council as a member of the Socialist Party and served 4 terms.

In the 2000 Japanese general election, Himori ran for the 13th district in Saitama and lost, but won his first election at the Proportional North Kanto block. He was defeated in the 2003 Japanese general election, as well as the 2004 Japanese House of Councillors election. He ran as an independent candidate in the North Kanto block in the 2005 Japanese general election and won. In December 2007 he took office as chairperson of party parliamentary countermeasure chairperson at the Social Democratic Party convention. He lost in the 2009 Japanese general election. After he lost the 2010 Japanese House of Councillors election, he retired from Japanese politics.

In 2017, Himori traveled to North Korea and he received a 1st Class Order of Friendship upon his visit.
