= Kasukabe High School =

Secondary school in Kasukabe, Saitama, Japan

Coordinates: 35°58′45.5″N 139°44′30.1″E

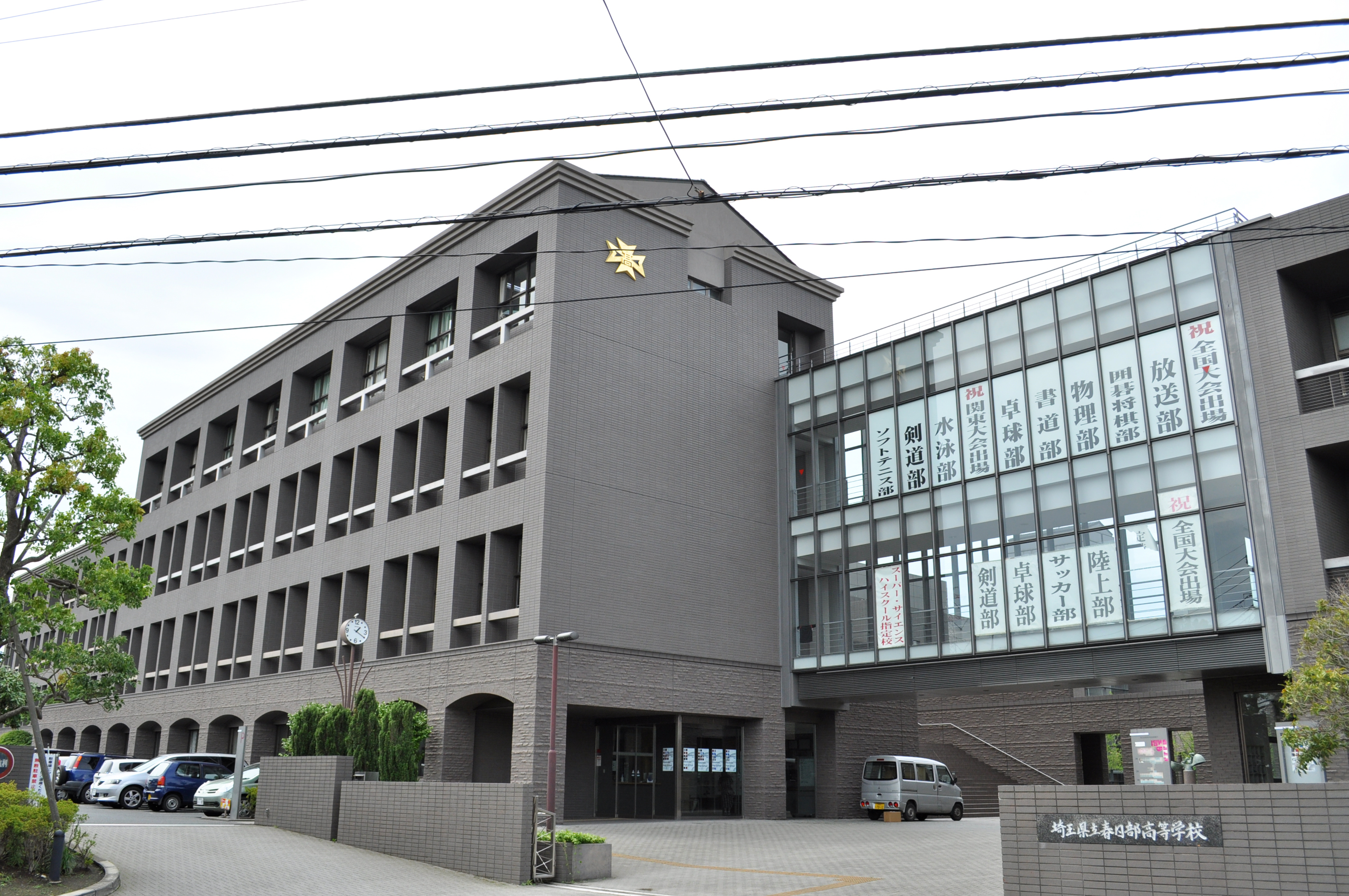
Saitama Prefectural Kasukabe High School

Saitama Prefectural Kasukabe High School (埼玉県立春日部高等学校 Saitama-kenritsu Kasukabe Kōtōgakkō) is a secondary school located in Kasukabe, Saitama, Japan. Founded in 1899, the School incorporates the Maltese Cross in its emblem.

The School has developed several student exchange schemes with Melbourne High School, since 1997 with Westfields Sports High School, Australia, and from 2007 with Haddonfield Memorial High School, New Jersey, United States.
