= Tsuyoshi Yamaguchi (politician) =

Japanese politician (born 1954)

- 山口 壯
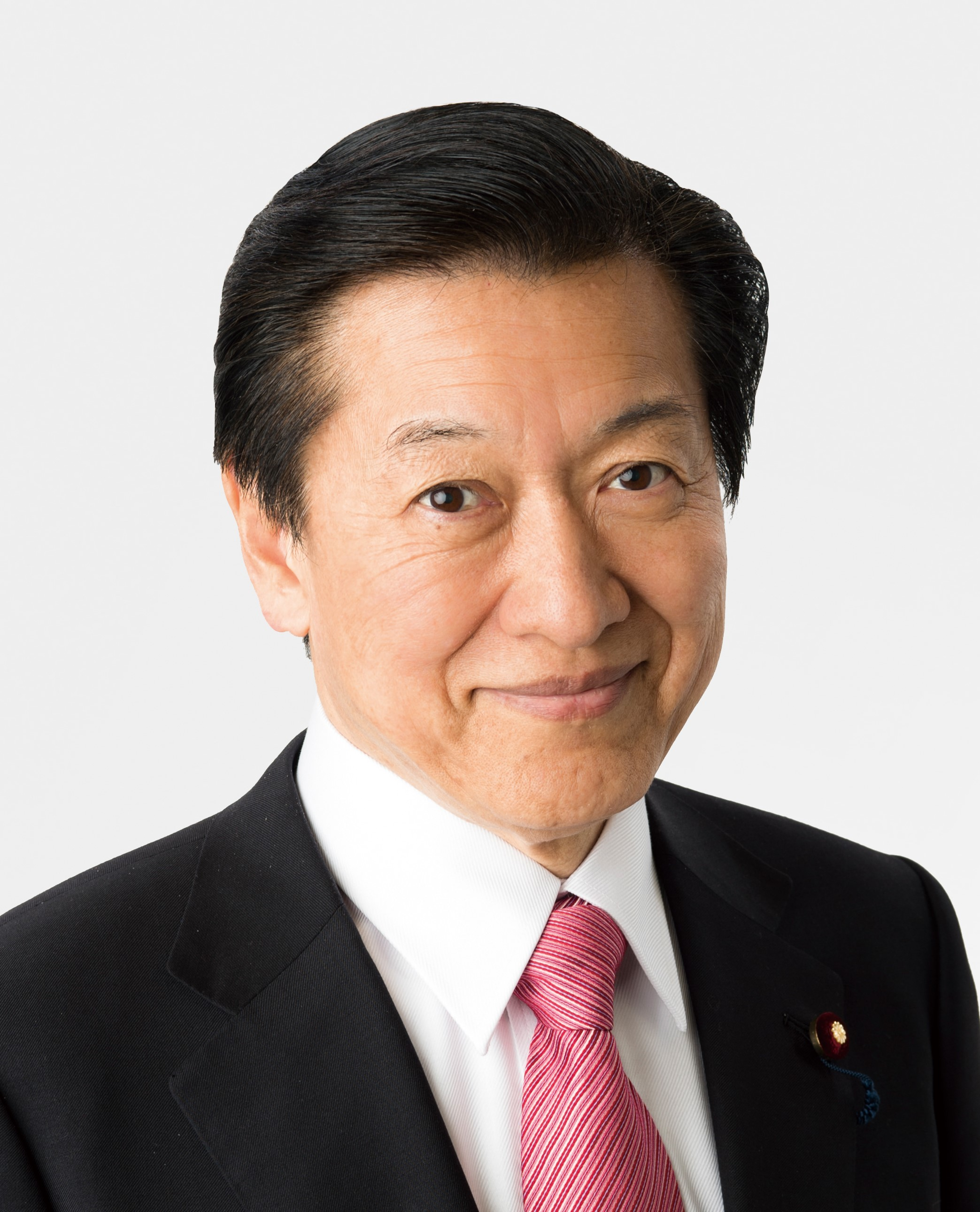
- Official portrait, 2019

Minister of the Environment
- In office 4 October 2021 – 10 August 2022
- Prime Minister: Fumio Kishida
- Preceded by: Shinjirō Koizumi
- Succeeded by: Akihiro Nishimura

Member of the House of Representatives
- Incumbent
- Assumed office 11 September 2005
- Preceded by: Saburo Komoto
- Constituency: Kinki PR (2005–2009); Hyōgo 12th (2009–present)
- In office 25 June 2000 – 9 November 2003
- Preceded by: Saburo Komoto
- Succeeded by: Saburo Komoto
- Constituency: Hyōgo 12th

Personal details
- Born: 3 October 1954 (age 72) Aioi, Hyogo, Japan
- Party: Liberal Democratic
- Other political affiliations: NFP (1996–1998); Independent (1998–2003); DPJ (2003–2013)
- Children: 2
- Education: University of Tokyo (Bachelor of Laws); Johns Hopkins University (PhD in International Relations)

Tsuyoshi Yamaguchi (山口 壯, Yamaguchi Tsuyoshi; born 3 October 1954) is a Japanese politician of the Liberal Democratic Party and a member of the House of Representatives. He also served as Minister of the Environment from October 2021 to August 2022.

== Biography ==
Yamaguchi is a native of Aioi, Hyōgo. He is an only child who was raised by his father—a dentist—and his father's sister. He excelled as a tennis star in his student years and has been avid player since.

After graduating from the faculty of law of the University of Tokyo in 1978, he joined the Ministry of Foreign Affairs in 1979 and received a Ph. D from SAIS at Johns Hopkins University in the United States while an attache to the Embassy of Japan in Washington, D.C. When living in the U.S., he took up golf. Years prior to pursuing his political ambitions, Yamaguchi took a keen interest in politics and dreamed of serving his country as an elected official. He was an ardent admirer of Ronald Reagan, who was serving as U.S. President during Yamaguchi's student years in Washington, D.C.

Yamaguchi served in several bureaus of the Ministry of Foreign Affairs (MOFA) in Tokyo, as well as the Japan Defense Agency during the period 1982 to 1989. Between 1989 and 1995 he held three positions as First Secretary—in the Embassies of Japan in China, Pakistan, and the United Kingdom, respectively. In October 1995, he resigned from the Ministry of Foreign Affairs.

Yamaguchi was elected to the House of Representatives for the first time in 2000. He has been elected 6 times, in 2000, 2005, 2009, 2012, 2014, and 2017. In September 2011, he became Parliamentary Senior Vice-Minister for Foreign Affairs (a member of the Noda Cabinet). In October 2021 he became the Minister of the Environment as a member of the Kishida Cabinet.

He studied for his master's degree at SAIS in Washington, D.C. beginning in the fall of 1980 through the spring of 1982 and completed his doctoral dissertation and received his PhD thereafter. His PhD adviser was Nathaniel B. Thayer, Yasuhiro Nakasone Professor and senior adviser to the Reischauer Center at SAIS. A strong interest of Yamaguchi's that figured prominently in his master's thesis and doctoral dissertation was the evolution of U.S.-Japanese relations in the modern era. The dissertation is titled "The Making of an Alliance: Japan’s Alliance Policy 1945-1952."

== Family ==
Yamaguchi is married and has two daughters.

Political offices
Preceded by Shinjirō Koizumi	Minister of the Environment; 2021–2022	Succeeded by Akihiro Nishimura
