= Eiichi Nakamura =

Eiichi Nakamura may refer to:

- Eiichi Nakamura (field hockey) (中村 英一, 1909–1945), Japanese field hockey player
- Eiichi Nakamura (politician) (born 1930), Japanese politician
- Eiichi Nakamura (chemist) (中村 栄一, born 1951), Japanese chemist
