= Independent Association (Japan) =

Independent Association 無所属の会
- Founded: December 1999
- Dissolved: July 2004

The Independent Association (無所属の会, Mushozoku no kai) was a political party in Japan. It functioned as an electoral alliance of independent members of National Diet to access public funding, and had no unifying ideology. It was registered as a political party in December 1999 by several members primarily from the House of Councillors.

The party ran nine candidates in the 2000 Japanese general election and five were elected, all in single-member constituencies. The party ran one candidate for national block in the 2001 upper house election but was not successful. Eight candidates ran in the 2003 general election but only Kōzō Watanabe was successful.

Its leaders were Motoo Shiina (Dec 1999–Aug 2001), Masami Tanabu (Aug 2001–Oct 2003), and Kōzō Watanabe (Oct 2003–Jul 2004). The party was dissolved in July 2004 when its remaining members retired from the House of Councillors after the 2004 upper house election. Watanabe went on to join the Democratic Party of Japan.
