= Mamoru Kobayashi =

Japanese politician (1944–2023)

- 小林 守

Member of the House of Representatives; from Northern Kanto
- In office 18 February 1990 – 10 October 2003
- Preceded by: Hideyoshi Hirose
- Succeeded by: Multi-member district
- Constituency: Tochigi 1st (1990–1996); PR block (1996–2003)

Personal details
- Born: 26 October 1944 Kanuma, Tochigi, Japan
- Died: 17 January 2023 (aged 78) Kanuma, Tochigi, Japan
- Party: Democratic (1998–2005)
- Other political affiliations: JSP (1990–1996); SDP (1996); DP 1996 (1996–1998); Independent (2005–2016); DP 2016 (2016–2018); CDP (2018–2023)
- Education: Tokyo University of Education

Mamoru Kobayashi (Japanese: 小林守 Kobayashi Mamoru; 26 October 1944 – 17 January 2023) was a Japanese politician. A member of the Japan Socialist Party, he served in the House of Representatives from 1990 to 2003.

Kobayashi died in Kanuma on 17 January 2023, at the age of 78.
