= Kaneshige Wakamatsu =

Japanese politician (born 1955)

- 若松 謙維
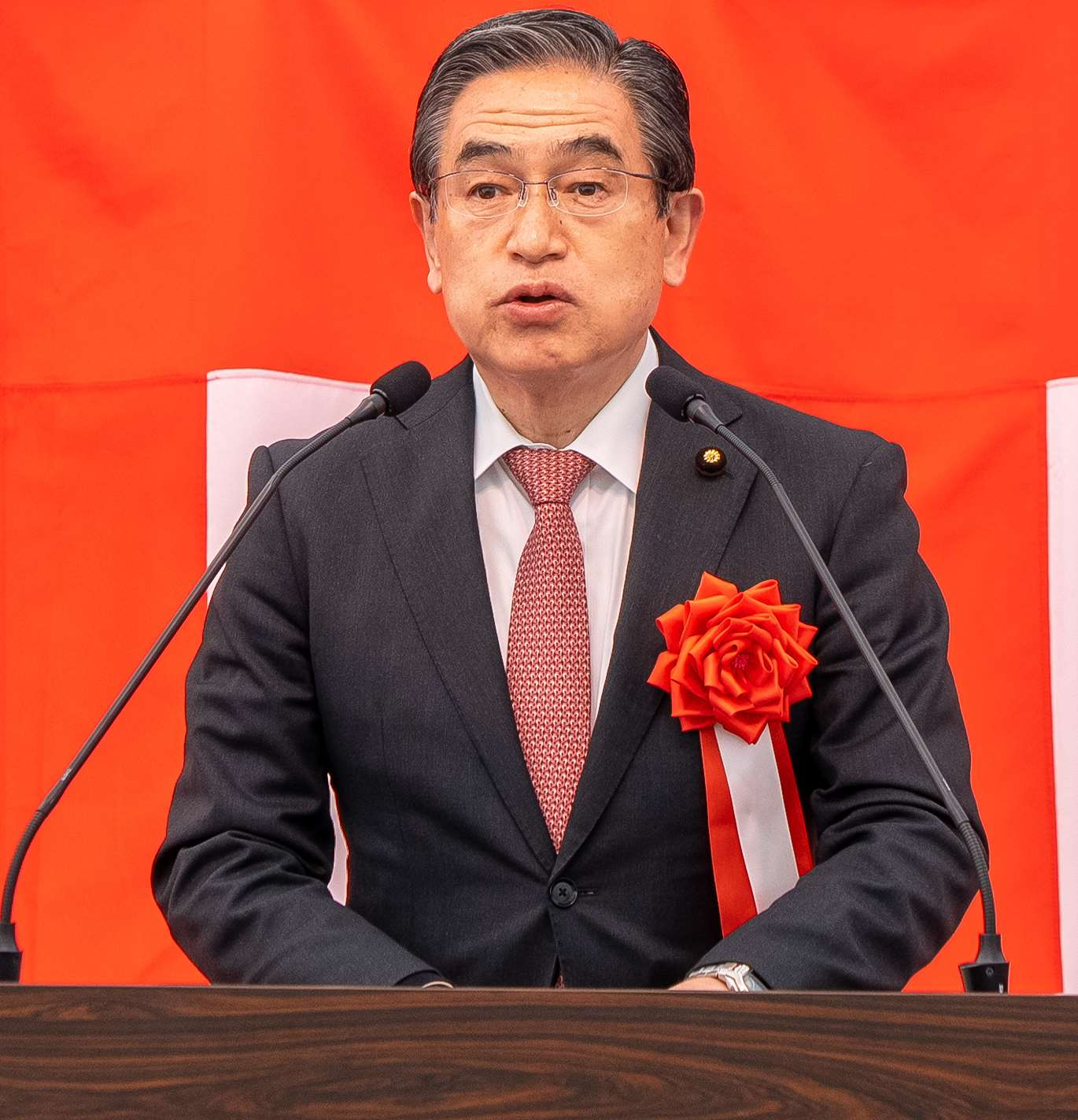
- Wakamatsu in 2022

Member of the House of Councillors
- In office 29 July 2013 – 28 July 2025
- Constituency: National PR

Member of the House of Representatives; from Northern Kanto
- In office 18 July 1993 – 10 October 2003
- Constituency: Saitama 5th (1993–1996); Saitama 6th (1996–2000); PR block (2000–2003)

Personal details
- Born: 5 August 1955 (age 71) Ishikawa, Fukushima, Japan
- Party: Komeito (since 1998)
- Other political affiliations: CGP (1993–1994); NFP (1994–1998)
- Education: Chuo University

Kaneshige Wakamatsu (born 5 August 1955, in Fukushima Prefecture, Japan) is a Japanese politician and accountant who served as a member of the House of Councillors of Japan from 2013 to 2025. He previously served as a member of the House of Representatives of Japan from 1993 to 2003. He represents the National proportional representation block as a member of Komeito.

As of 24 June 2023, he is a member of the following committees:

- Committee on Health, Labor, and Welfare
- Committee on the Budget

Additionally, he serves as the director of the House of Councillors Special Committee on Reconstruction after the Great East Japan Earthquake.

== Career ==
He graduated from Chuo University in 1978, and passed the Certified Public Accountant Examination that same year. He worked as an accountant until his election to the House of Representatives in 1993. He won re-election in the 1996 election. In the 2000 election, he lost his seat, but was still elected through proportional representation. He was not re-elected in 2003.

In 2013, he won election to the House of Councillors. He was re-elected in 2019.
