= 2003 Japanese general election =

- 9 November 2003

All 480 seats in the House of Representatives of Japan 241 seats needed for a majority
- Turnout: 59.85% (▼2.64pp; Const. votes); 59.80% (▼2.64pp; PR votes)
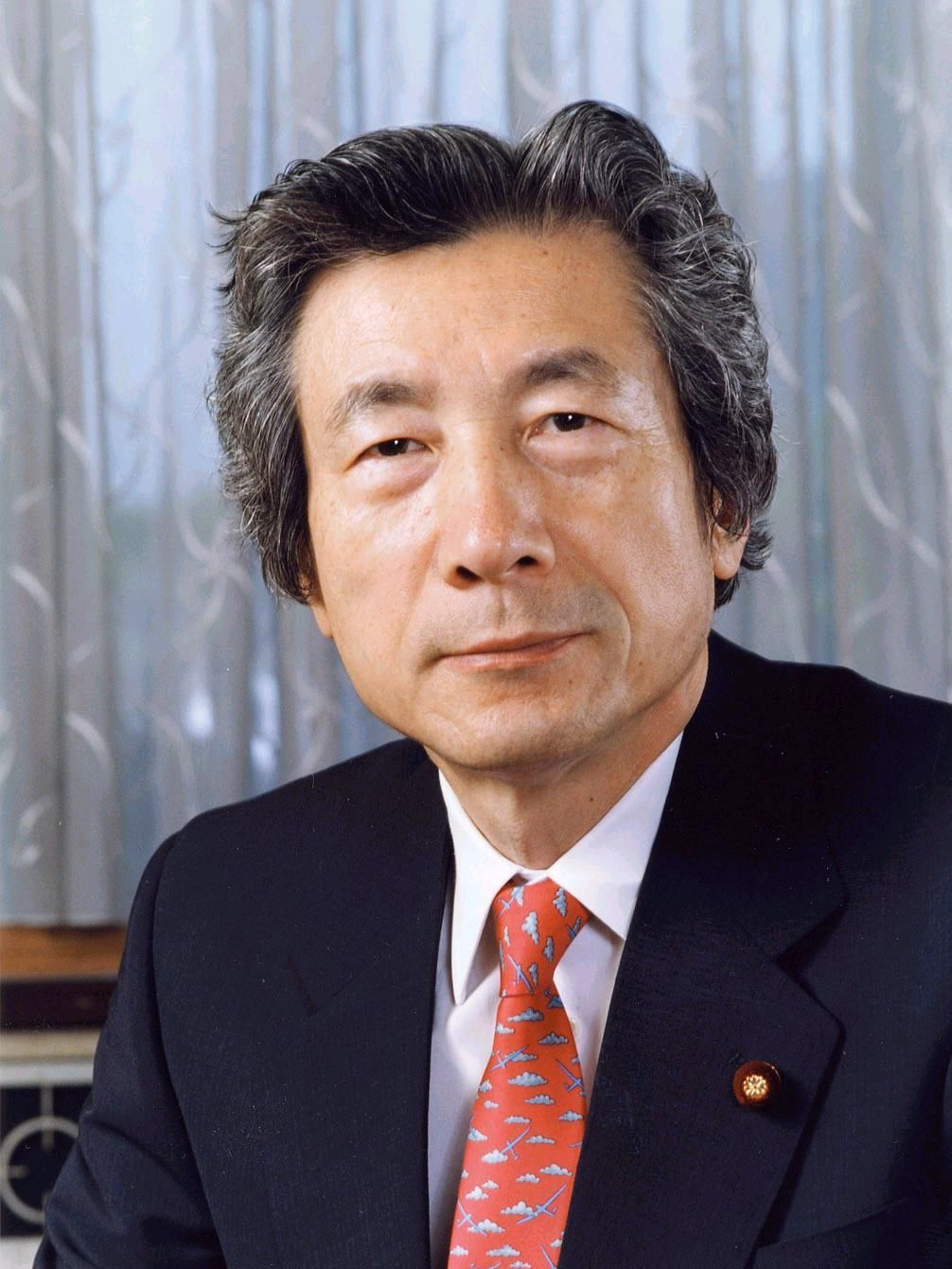

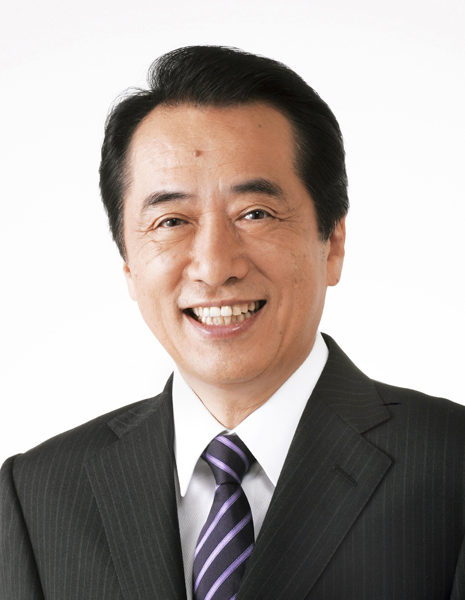

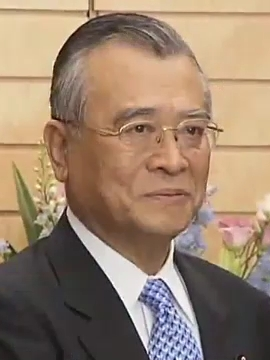

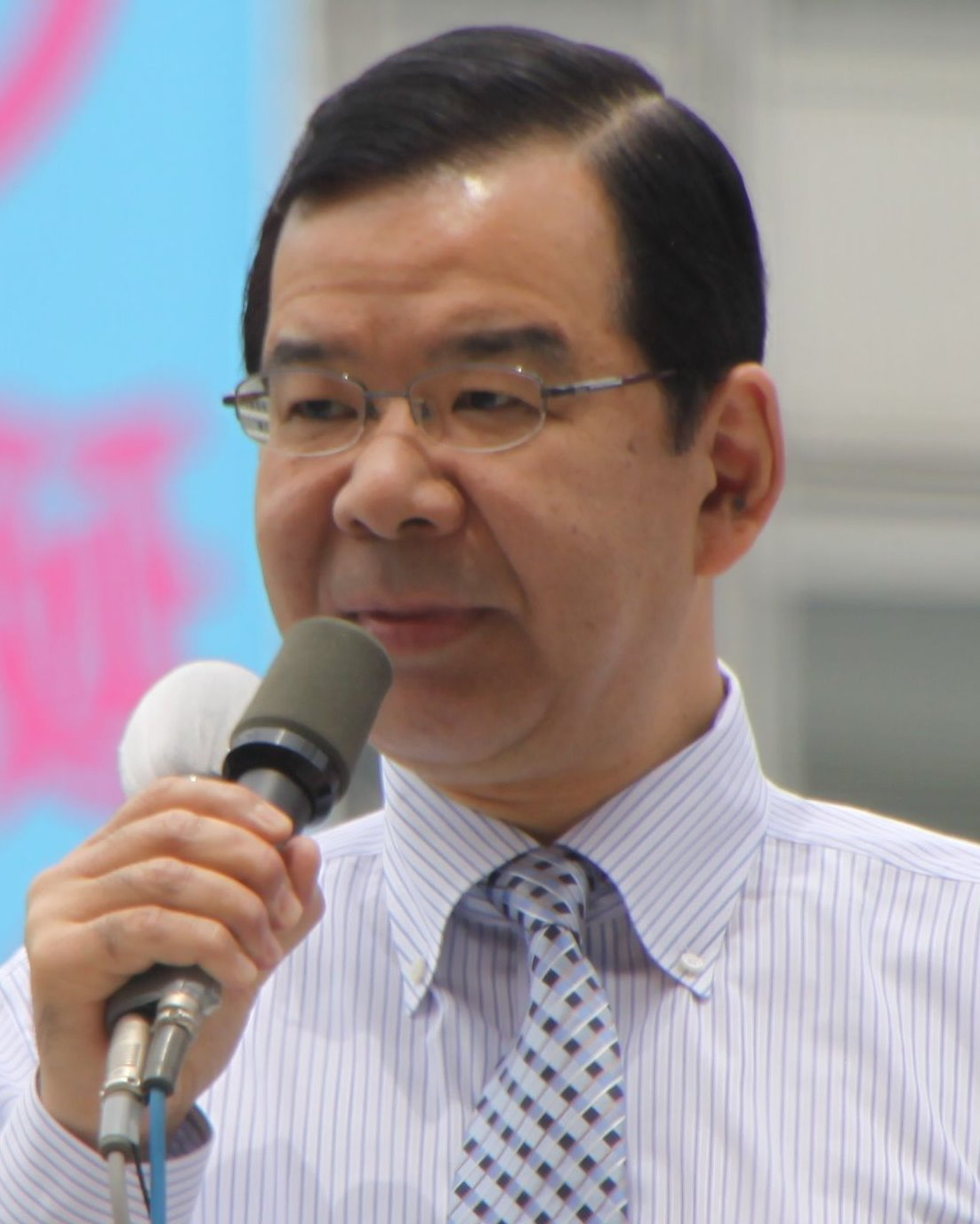

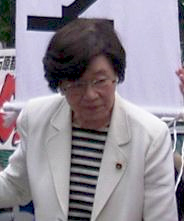
	First party	Second party	Third party
Leader	Junichiro Koizumi	Naoto Kan	Takenori Kanzaki
Party	LDP	Democratic	New Kōmeitō
Last election	233 seats	149 seats (Note: Democratic Party of Japan and Liberal Party)	31 seats
Seats before	247	137	31
Seats won	237	177	34
Seat change	▲4	▲28	▲3
Constituency vote	26,089,327	21,814,154	886,507
% and swing	43.85% (▲2.88pp)	36.66% (▲9.05pp)	1.49% (▼0.53pp)
Regional vote	20,660,185	22,095,636	8,733,444
% and swing	34.96% (▲6.65pp)	37.39% (▲12.21pp)	14.78% (▲1.81pp)
	Fourth party	Fifth party	Sixth party
Leader	Kazuo Shii	Takako Doi	Hiroshi Kumagai
Party	JCP	Social Democratic	New Conservative
Last election	20 seats	19 seats	7 seats
Seats before	20	18	9
Seats won	9	6	4
Seat change	▼11	▼13	▼3
Constituency vote	4,837,953	1,708,672	791,588
% and swing	8.13% (▼3.95pp)	2.87% (▼0.93pp)	1.33% (▼0.69pp)
Regional vote	4,586,172	3,027,390	–
% and swing	7.76% (▼3.47pp)	5.12% (▼4.24pp)	(▼0.41pp)
- Districts and PR districts, shaded according to winners' vote strength
Prime Minister before election
Junichiro Koizumi
LDP
Elected Prime Minister
Junichiro Koizumi
LDP

General elections were held in Japan on November 9, 2003. Incumbent Prime Minister Junichiro Koizumi and the Liberal Democratic Party won the most seats in the House of Representatives but failed to secure a majority. The main opposition Democratic Party made considerable gains, winning 177 of the 480 seats in the House of Representatives, its largest share ever. Other traditional parties like the Communist Party and the Social Democratic Party lost substantial numbers of seats, marking the start of a newly consolidated two-party system in Japanese politics, which would end in 2012 with the emergence of the Japan Restoration Party.

== Background ==
On October 11, 2003, following his re-election as leader of the Liberal Democratic Party on September 20, Prime Minister Junichiro Koizumi dissolved the House of Representatives of Japan's Diet. This action was in accordance with Article 7 of the Constitution of Japan, which grants the Prime Minister the authority to dissolve the lower house after consulting the Emperor.

This election marked the first since Koizumi assumed the role of Prime Minister in April 2001. The primary contenders were the Liberal Democratic Party (LDP) and the Democratic Party (DPJ). The LDP continued to enjoy robust support in rural regions and among the elderly, largely due to substantial agricultural subsidies, while the DPJ was more popular with younger voters and in urban centers. Nonetheless, the LDP was favored due to the disproportionate influence of less populated rural districts within Japan's electoral framework.

Key issues addressed by the candidates included the persistent economic recession, known as the Lost Decades; reforms to the public pension system; the level of Japan's involvement in Iraq in support of the U.S.; relations with North Korea; and the privatization of Japan Post Holdings and highways in the Tokyo area.

The preceding general election for the Lower House occurred in June 2000 under the leadership of Prime Minister Yoshiro Mori.

== Results ==
Constituency Cartogram

National newspapers have reported that the recent election was more favorable to the Democratic Party (DPJ) than to the Liberal Democratic Party (LDP). The DPJ secured a plurality of votes and added 40 seats, becoming the largest opposition party with 177 seats in the lower house. Within the ruling coalition, only New Kōmeitō saw an increase, raising its membership from 31 to 34. Despite Prime Minister Koizumi's high approval ratings, the LDP did not gain additional seats, leading some analysts to view Koizumi as a weakened Prime Minister. However, others note that several non-partisan members were actually aligned with the LDP, including Kato Koichi, suggesting the LDP effectively maintained its seat count.

The LDP was successful in rural regions, whereas the DPJ excelled in urban centers. Voter turnout was 59.86%, marking it the second-lowest since 1945. The new house members had an average age of 51.03 years, which is 3.2 years younger than the previous election's average. A majority of the new members, 302, were born post-1945. Post-election, the number of women in the lower house fell to 34 from the previous 35.

Early poll data and exit polls underscored the impact of swing voters, who comprised 18% of the electorate. The Asahi Shimbun reported that over half of these voters chose the DPJ. Exit polls initially produced varied forecasts, with one predicting the DPJ would secure as many as 230 seats, over 50 more than the actual outcome.

The Liberal Democratic Party did not secure a majority on its own, necessitating the continuation of its coalition with New Kōmeitō and the New Conservative Party.

Party	Proportional			Constituency			Total seats	+/–
Party	Votes	%	Seats	Votes	%	Seats	Total seats	+/–
Democratic Party of Japan	22,095,636	37.39	72	21,814,154	36.66	105	177	+50
Liberal Democratic Party	20,660,185	34.96	69	26,089,327	43.85	168	237	+4
New Komeito Party	8,733,444	14.78	25	886,507	1.49	9	34	+3
Japan Communist Party	4,586,172	7.76	9	4,837,953	8.13	0	9	−11
Social Democratic Party	3,027,390	5.12	5	1,708,672	2.87	1	6	−13
New Conservative Party				791,588	1.33	4	4	−3
Independent Association				497,108	0.84	1	1	−4
Liberal League				97,423	0.16	1	1	–
Other parties				51,524	0.09	0	0	–
Independents				2,728,118	4.58	11	11	−4
Total	59,102,827	100.00	180	59,502,374	100.00	300	480	0
Valid votes	59,102,827	96.60		59,502,374	97.24			
Invalid/blank votes	2,080,459	3.40		1,687,433	2.76			
Total votes	61,183,286	100.00		61,189,807	100.00			
Registered voters/turnout	102,306,684	59.80		102,232,944	59.85			
Source: Election Resources, IPU

=== By prefecture ===
Prefecture	Total seats	Seats won							
Prefecture	Total seats	LDP	DPJ	NKP	NCP	SDP	AI	LL	Ind.
Aichi	15	3	10		2				
Akita	3	1	1						1
Aomori	4	4							
Chiba	13	5	8						
Ehime	4	4							
Fukui	3	3							
Fukuoka	11	5	5						1
Fukushima	5	3	1				1		
Gifu	5	5							
Gunma	5	5							
Hiroshima	7	6	1						
Hokkaido	12	5	7						
Hyōgo	12	5	3	2	1				1
Ibaraki	7	6	1						
Ishikawa	3	2	1						
Iwate	4	1	3						
Kagawa	3	3							
Kagoshima	5	4						1	
Kanagawa	18	9	8	1					
Kōchi	3	3							
Kumamoto	5	3	1						1
Kyoto	6	3	3						
Mie	5	3	2						
Miyagi	6	3	3						
Miyazaki	3	1							2
Nagano	5	3	2						
Nagasaki	4	3	1						
Nara	4	2	2						
Niigata	6	2	3						1
Ōita	3	2							1
Okayama	5	5							
Okinawa	4	2		1		1			
Osaka	19	6	9	4					
Saga	3	2	1						
Saitama	15	7	8						
Shiga	4	1	3						
Shimane	2	2							
Shizuoka	8	4	3						1
Tochigi	5	5							
Tokushima	3	2	1						
Tokyo	25	12	12	1					
Tottori	2	1							1
Toyama	3	3							
Wakayama	3	2			1				
Yamagata	3	2							1
Yamaguchi	4	3	1						
Yamanashi	3	2	1						
Total	300	168	105	9	4	1	1	1	11

=== By PR block ===
PR block	Total seats	Seats won				
PR block	Total seats	DPJ	LDP	NKP	JCP	SDP
Chūgoku	11	4	5	2		
Hokkaido	8	4	3	1		
Hokuriku–Shinetsu	11	5	5	1		
Kinki (Kansai)	29	11	9	5	3	1
Kyushu	21	7	8	3	1	2
Northern Kanto	20	8	8	3	1	
Shikoku	6	2	3	1		
Southern Kanto	22	9	8	3	1	1
Tohoku	14	5	6	1	1	1
Tōkai	21	9	8	3	1	
Tokyo	17	8	6	2	1	
Total	180	72	69	25	9	5
