= Results of the 2017 Japanese general election =

- 22 October 2017
- All 465 seats in the House of Representatives; 233 seats needed for a majority
Party	Leader	Seats	+/–
LDP	Shinzō Abe	284	−7
CDP	Yukio Edano	55	New
Kibō no Tō	Yuriko Koike	50	New
Komeito	Natsuo Yamaguchi	29	−6
JCP	Kazuo Shii	12	−9
Ishin	Ichirō Matsui	11	New
Social Democratic	Tadatomo Yoshida	2	0
Independents	–	22	+14
This lists parties that won seats. See the complete results below.
- Constituency seats
- All 289 seats
- Turnout: 53.68% (▲1.03pp)
Party	Vote %	Seats	+/–
LDP	47.82	218	−5
Kibō no Tō	20.64	18	New
CDP	8.53	18	New
JCP	9.02	1	0
Ishin	3.18	3	New
Komeito	1.50	8	−1
Social Democratic	1.15	1	0
Independents	7.79	22	+14
This lists parties that won seats. See the complete results below.
- Proportional seats
- All 176 seats
- Turnout: 53.68% (▲1.03pp)
Party	Vote %	Seats	+/–
LDP	33.28	66	−2
CDP	19.88	37	New
Kibō no Tō	17.36	32	New
Komeito	12.51	21	−5
JCP	7.90	11	−9
Ishin	6.07	8	New
Social Democratic	1.69	1	0
This lists parties that won seats. See the complete results below.
Results by constituency and PR seats, shaded according to vote strength
Prime Minister before	Prime Minister after
Shinzo Abe; LDP	Shinzo Abe; LDP

This article presents detailed results of the 2017 Japanese general election. The results are separated into each of the eleven proportional representation blocks and their corresponding prefectures. In the following tables, candidates elected via single-member district are highlighted in green, while candidates elected via proportional representation are highlighted in red.

== Electoral system ==
The House of Representatives is elected via parallel voting. In the 2017 election, 289 members were elected in single-member districts and 176 via party-list proportional representation in eleven multi-member constituencies, referred to as "PR blocks". Single-member districts are apportioned between prefectures and numbered (1st, 2nd, etc). Candidates may run solely in a single-member district, solely in PR, or both (dual listing). Dual listed candidates must win at least 10% of the vote in their single-member district in order to be eligible for election via PR. Dual listed candidates who win their single-member district race are not eligible for election via PR.

Candidates on PR lists may be ranked sequentially or, if they are dual listed, ranked equally with one another. If ranked equally, the best-loser ratio (sekihairitsu) of each candidate determines the order of election. This number is determined by dividing their single-member district votes by those of the winning candidate in that district. In this way, the losing candidates who performed best will be elected first.

If a party wins more PR seats than they have eligible candidates on their list, the unfilled seats will be distributed to other parties in accordance with the PR formula.

== Hokkaidō block ==
2017 Japanese general election in Hokkaido
- 22 October 2017

All 20 seats to the House of Representatives
	Majority party	Minority party	Third party
Party	LDP	CDP	Komeito
Last election	11 seats	New	2 seats
Constituency	6	4	1
PR seats	3	3	1
Total	9	7	2
Seat change	▼2	▲7	0
	Fourth party	Fifth party
Party	Kibō no Tō	JCP
Last election	6 seats (Note: Democratic Party of Japan and JIP)	1 seat
Constituency	0	0
PR seats	1	0
Total	1	0
Seat change	▼4	▼1

Single-member constituency results in Hokkaido
Constituency	Previous member		Elected member		Votes	%	Margin	Runner-up	Party	%	Status
Hokkaido 1st	Takahiro Yokomichi	DPJ	Daiki Michishita	CDP	139,110	53.5	18,123	Toshimitsu Funabashi	LDP	46.5	CDP gain from DPJ
Hokkaido 2nd	Takamori Yoshikawa	LDP	Takamori Yoshikawa	LDP	104,824	41.3	30,399	Kenko Matsuki	KnT	29.4	LDP hold
Hokkaido 3rd	Hirohisa Takagi	LDP	Satoshi Arai	CDP	141,680	54.4	22,719	Hirohisa Takagi	LDP	45.6	CDP gain from LDP
Hokkaido 4th	Hiroyuki Nakamura	LDP	Hiroyuki Nakamura	LDP	104,054	45.9	13,435	Hiranao Honda	CDP	40.0	LDP hold
Hokkaido 5th	Yoshiaki Wada	LDP	Yoshiaki Wada	LDP	142,687	49.8	6,739	Maki Ikeda	CDP	47.5	LDP hold
Hokkaido 6th	Takahiro Sasaki	CDP	Takahiro Sasaki	CDP	136,312	54.5	22,461	Hiroshi Imazu	LDP	45.5	CDP hold
Hokkaido 7th	Yoshitaka Itō	LDP	Yoshitaka Itō	LDP	95,200	66.6	47,460	Akemi Ishikawa	JCP	33.4	LDP hold
Hokkaido 8th	Seiji Osaka	Ind.	Seiji Osaka	Ind.	125,771	55.4	24,528	Kazuo Maeda	LDP	44.6	Ind. hold
Hokkaido 9th	Manabu Horii	LDP	Manabu Horii	LDP	108,747	46.8	20,427	Tatsumaru Yamaoka	KnT	38.0	LDP hold
Hokkaido 10th	Hisashi Inatsu	Komei	Hisashi Inatsu	Komei	96,795	50.1	513	Hiroshi Kamiya	CDP	49.9	Komei hold
Hokkaido 11th	Yūko Nakagawa	LDP	Kaori Ishikawa	CDP	98,214	54.5	16,118	Yūko Nakagawa	LDP	45.5	CDP gain from LDP
Hokkaido 12th	Arata Takebe	LDP	Arata Takebe	LDP	97,113	54.1	38,691	Mika Mizukami	KnT	32.6	LDP hold

Proportional representation results
Party	Votes	Seats	Rank	Elected member	Constituency	Ratio
LDP	779,903 (28.8%)	3	1	Kōichi Watanabe		
LDP	779,903 (28.8%)	3	2	Takako Suzuki		
LDP	779,903 (28.8%)	3	3	Toshimitsu Funabashi	Hokkaido 1st	87.0%
CDP	714,032 (26.4%)	3	1	Hiroshi Kamiya	Hokkaido 10th	99.5%
CDP	714,032 (26.4%)	3	1	Maki Ikeda	Hokkaido 5th	95.3%
CDP	714,032 (26.4%)	3	1	Hiranao Honda	Hokkaido 4th	87.1%
KnT	331,463 (12.2%)	1	1	Tatsumaru Yamaoka	Hokkaido 9th	81.2%
Komei	298,573 (11.0%)	1	1	Hidemichi Satō		

== Tohoku block ==
2017 Japanese general election in Tohoku
- 22 October 2017

All 36 seats to the House of Representatives
	Majority party	Minority party	Third party
Party	LDP	Kibō no Tō	CDP
Last election	24 seats	11 seats	New
Constituency	18	1	0
PR seats	5	3	3
Total	23	4	3
Seat change	▼1	▼7	▲3
	Fourth party	Fifth party	Sixth party
Party	Komeito	JCP	Ind.
Last election	2 seats	1 seat	0 seats
Constituency	0	0	0
PR seats	1	1	–
Total	1	1	4
Seat change	▼1	0	▲4

Single-member constituency results in Tohoku
Constituency	Previous member		Elected member		Votes	%	Margin	Runner-up	Party	%	Status
Aomori 1st	Jun Tsushima	LDP	Jun Tsushima	LDP	103,177	54.9	39,004	Sekio Masuta	KnT	34.2	LDP hold
Aomori 2nd	Akinori Eto	LDP	Tadamori Ōshima	LDP	133,545	64.0	77,534	Takeshi Kudo	KnT	26.9	LDP hold
Aomori 3rd	Tadamori Ōshima	LDP	Jiro Kimura	LDP	128,740	64.2	77,644	Takashi Yamauchi	KnT	25.5	LDP hold
Aomori 4th	Vacant	LDP	Seat abolished								LDP loss
Iwate 1st	Takeshi Shina	KnT	Takeshi Shina	KnT	87,534	52.6	30,153	Hinako Takahashi	LDP	34.5	KnT hold
Iwate 2nd	Shun'ichi Suzuki	LDP	Shun'ichi Suzuki	LDP	129,884	56.8	31,042	Koji Hata	KnT	43.2	LDP hold
Iwate 3rd	Toru Kikawada	DPJ	Ichirō Ozawa	Ind.	130,229	57.4	33,658	Takashi Fujiwara	LDP	42.6	Ind. gain from DPJ
Iwate 4th	Ichirō Ozawa	Ind.	Seat abolished								Ind. loss
Miyagi 1st	Tōru Doi	LDP	Tōru Doi	LDP	100,123	46.2	21,419	Akiko Okamoto	CDP	36.3	LDP hold
Miyagi 2nd	Kenya Akiba	LDP	Kenya Akiba	LDP	111,559	50.3	1,316	Sayuri Kamata	Ind.	49.7	LDP hold
Miyagi 3rd	Akihiro Nishimura	LDP	Akihiro Nishimura	LDP	92,893	60.3	52,223	Yoshihiro Ichijo	KnT	26.4	LDP hold
Miyagi 4th	Shintaro Ito	LDP	Shintaro Ito	LDP	73,298	58.4	38,874	Takehiko Bando	KnT	27.4	LDP hold
Miyagi 5th	Jun Azumi	Ind.	Jun Azumi	Ind.	89,423	63.9	38,927	Shigeaki Katsunuma	LDP	36.1	Ind. hold
Miyagi 6th	Itsunori Onodera	LDP	Itsunori Onodera	LDP	123,871	85.7	103,233	Yushi Yokota	JCP	14.3	LDP hold
Akita 1st	Hiroyuki Togashi	LDP	Hiroyuki Togashi	LDP	79,442	53.7	25,592	Daigo Matsuura	KnT	36.4	LDP hold
Akita 2nd	Katsutoshi Kaneda	LDP	Katsutoshi Kaneda	LDP	74,835	46.3	1,672	Takashi Midorikawa	KnT	45.3	LDP hold
Akita 3rd	Nobuhide Minorikawa	LDP	Nobuhide Minorikawa	LDP	107,432	50.6	13,686	Toshihide Muraoka	KnT	44.1	LDP hold
Yamagata 1st	Toshiaki Endo	LDP	Toshiaki Endo	LDP	104,227	57.3	41,820	Kan Arai	KnT	34.3	LDP hold
Yamagata 2nd	Norikazu Suzuki	LDP	Norikazu Suzuki	LDP	109,949	51.6	17,914	Yōsuke Kondō	KnT	43.2	LDP hold
Yamagata 3rd	Ayuko Kato	LDP	Ayuko Kato	LDP	103,973	52.2	22,265	Juichi Abe	KnT	41.0	LDP hold
Fukushima 1st	Yoshitami Kameoka	LDP	Emi Kaneko	Ind.	126,664	52.7	13,150	Yoshitami Kameoka	LDP	47.3	Ind. gain from LDP
Fukushima 2nd	Takumi Nemoto	LDP	Takumi Nemoto	LDP	96,892	52.6	37,515	Mitsunori Okabe	KnT	32.2	LDP hold
Fukushima 3rd	Kōichirō Genba	Ind.	Kōichirō Genba	Ind.	92,930	56.6	32,924	Kentarō Uesugi	LDP	36.6	Ind. hold
Fukushima 4th	Shinji Oguma	KnT	Ichirō Kanke	LDP	68,282	44.7	1,209	Shinji Oguma	KnT	43.9	LDP gain from KnT
Fukushima 5th	Masayoshi Yoshino	LDP	Masayoshi Yoshino	LDP	86,461	53.6	34,983	Izumi Yoshida	KnT	31.9	LDP hold

Proportional representation results
Party	Votes	Seats	Rank	Elected member	Constituency	Ratio
LDP	1,453,871 (34.6%)	5	1	Akinori Eto		
LDP	1,453,871 (34.6%)	5	2	Yoshitami Kameoka	Fukushima 1st	89.6%
LDP	1,453,871 (34.6%)	5	2	Takashi Fujiwara	Iwate 4th	74.2%
LDP	1,453,871 (34.6%)	5	2	Hinako Takahashi	Iwate 1st	65.6%
LDP	1,453,871 (34.6%)	5	2	Kentarō Uesugi	Fukushima 3rd	64.6%
KnT	912,819 (21.7%)	3	1	Manabu Terata		
KnT	912,819 (21.7%)	3	2	Shinji Oguma	Fukushima 4th	98.2%
KnT	912,819 (21.7%)	3	2	Takashi Midorikawa	Akita 2nd	97.8%
CDP	761,117 (18.1%)	3	1	Akiko Okamoto	Miyagi 1st	78.6%
CDP	761,117 (18.1%)	3	2	Makoto Yamazaki		
CDP	761,117 (18.1%)	3	3	Yukihiko Akutsu		
Komei	463,740 (11.0%)	1	1	Yoshihisa Inoue		
JCP	310,559 (7.4%)	1	1	Chizuko Takahashi		

== Northern Kanto block ==
2017 Japanese general election in Northern Kanto
- 22 October 2017

All 51 seats to the House of Representatives
	Majority party	Minority party	Third party
Party	LDP	CDP	Kibō no Tō
Last election	34 seats	New	11 seats
Constituency	27	1	1
PR seats	7	5	4
Total	34	6	5
Seat change	0	▲6	▼6
	Fourth party	Fifth party	Sixth party
Party	Komeito	JCP	Ind.
Last election	3 seats	2 seats	2 seats
Constituency	0	0	0
PR seats	2	1	–
Total	2	1	3
Seat change	▼1	▼1	▲1

Single-member constituency results in Northern Kanto
Constituency	Previous member		Elected member		Votes	%	Margin	Runner-up		%	Status
Ibaraki 1st	Yoshinori Tadokoro	LDP	Yoshinori Tadokoro	LDP	100,875	48.4	18,040	Nobuyuki Fukushima	KnT	39.8	LDP hold
Ibaraki 2nd	Fukushiro Nukaga	LDP	Fukushiro Nukaga	LDP	104,183	59.2	47,085	Masao Ishizu	KnT	32.5	LDP hold
Ibaraki 3rd	Yasuhiro Hanashi	LDP	Yasuhiro Hanashi	LDP	113,068	57.0	62,008	Mai Higuchi	KnT	25.8	LDP hold
Ibaraki 4th	Hiroshi Kajiyama	LDP	Hiroshi Kajiyama	LDP	97,966	69.9	68,419	Toshiaki Okuma	KnT	21.1	LDP hold
Ibaraki 5th	Akihiro Ohata	DPJ	Akimasa Ishikawa	LDP	61,450	48.2	5,352	Satoshi Asano	KnT	44.0	LDP gain from DPJ
Ibaraki 6th	Yuya Niwa	LDP	Ayano Kunimitsu	LDP	102,820	54.9	5,833	Yamato Aoyama	KnT	43.3	LDP hold
Ibaraki 7th	Kishirō Nakamura	Ind.	Kishirō Nakamura	Ind.	77,719	49.0	15,102	Keiko Nagaoka	LDP	39.5	Ind. hold
Tochigi 1st	Hajime Funada	LDP	Hajime Funada	LDP	109,139	51.9	58,017	Yuji Kashiwakura	KnT	24.3	LDP hold
Tochigi 2nd	Akio Fukuda	Ind.	Akio Fukuda	Ind.	75,031	53.4	9,586	Koya Nishikawa	LDP	46.6	Ind. hold
Tochigi 3rd	Kazuo Yana	LDP	Kazuo Yana	LDP	74,371	57.8	31,551	Miyuki Watanabe	KnT	33.3	LDP hold
Tochigi 4th	Tsutomu Sato	LDP	Tsutomu Sato	LDP	111,167	54.4	34,873	Takao Fujioka	KnT	37.4	LDP hold
Tochigi 5th	Toshimitsu Motegi	LDP	Toshimitsu Motegi	LDP	89,403	61.9	46,975	Minoru Omamiuda	KnT	28.7	LDP hold
Gunma 1st	Genichiro Sata	LDP	Asako Omi	LDP	92,641	48.8	21,072	Takeshi Miyazaki	KnT	37.7	LDP hold
Gunma 2nd	Toshiro Ino	LDP	Toshiro Ino	LDP	89,219	55.9	40,674	Takashi Ishizeki	KnT	30.4	LDP hold
Gunma 3rd	Hiroyoshi Sasagawa	LDP	Hiroyoshi Sasagawa	LDP	83,446	55.3	15,990	Kaichi Hasegawa	CDP	44.7	LDP hold
Gunma 4th	Tatsuo Fukuda	LDP	Tatsuo Fukuda	LDP	93,262	60.8	57,095	Hiroki Fuwa	KnT	23.6	LDP hold
Gunma 5th	Yūko Obuchi	LDP	Yūko Obuchi	LDP	109,453	64.9	79,326	Sachiko Inokuchi	KnT	17.9	LDP hold
Saitama 1st	Hideki Murai	LDP	Hideki Murai	LDP	106,699	46.9	30,983	Koichi Takemasa	KnT	33.3	LDP hold
Saitama 2nd	Yoshitaka Shindō	LDP	Yoshitaka Shindō	LDP	110,072	52.5	45,289	Katsumi Suga	KnT	30.9	LDP hold
Saitama 3rd	Hitoshi Kikawada	LDP	Hitoshi Kikawada	LDP	95,093	44.6	21,843	Yuriko Yamakawa	CDP	34.4	LDP hold
Saitama 4th	Mayuko Toyota	Ind.	Yasushi Hosaka	LDP	74,287	37.4	24,122	Yoshinori Yoshida	KnT	25.3	LDP gain from Ind.
Saitama 5th	Yukio Edano	CDP	Yukio Edano	CDP	119,091	57.4	42,068	Hideki Makihara	LDP	37.1	CDP hold
Saitama 6th	Atsushi Oshima	KnT	Atsushi Oshima	KnT	106,448	46.8	14,226	Kazuyuki Nakane	LDP	40.5	KnT hold
Saitama 7th	Saichi Kamiyama	LDP	Saichi Kamiyama	LDP	90,841	44.1	12,639	Yasuko Komiyama	KnT	38.0	LDP hold
Saitama 8th	Masahiko Shibayama	LDP	Masahiko Shibayama	LDP	92,952	49.5	31,451	Masatoshi Onozuka	KnT	32.8	LDP hold
Saitama 9th	Taku Otsuka	LDP	Taku Otsuka	LDP	111,815	53.2	54,216	Shinji Sugimura	KnT	27.4	LDP hold
Saitama 10th	Taimei Yamaguchi	LDP	Taimei Yamaguchi	LDP	85,453	48.0	19,347	Yunosuke Sakamoto	KnT	37.1	LDP hold
Saitama 11th	Ryuji Koizumi	Ind.	Ryuji Koizumi	Ind.	88,290	46.4	38,244	Tomohiro Konno	Ind.	29.3	Ind. hold
Saitama 12th	Atsushi Nonaka	LDP	Atsushi Nonaka	LDP	86,499	45.0	492	Toshikazu Morita	KnT	44.7	LDP hold
Saitama 13th	Shinako Tsuchiya	LDP	Shinako Tsuchiya	LDP	104,500	52.5	46,553	Yoshiyuki Kitazumi	KnT	29.1	LDP hold
Saitama 14th	Hiromi Mitsubayashi	LDP	Hiromi Mitsubayashi	LDP	98,443	47.5	35,710	Yoshihiro Suzuki	KnT	30.3	LDP hold
Saitama 15th	Ryosei Tanaka	LDP	Ryosei Tanaka	LDP	96,185	48.2	47,456	Satoshi Takayama	KnT	24.4	LDP hold

Proportional representation results
Party	Votes	Seats	Rank	Elected member	Constituency	Ratio
LDP	1,985,993 (33.2%)	7	1	Kazuyuki Nakane	Saitama 6th	86.6%
LDP	1,985,993 (33.2%)	7	1	Keiko Nagaoka	Ibaraki 7th	80.6%
LDP	1,985,993 (33.2%)	7	1	Hideki Makihara	Saitama 5th	64.7%
LDP	1,985,993 (33.2%)	7	30	Yasutaka Nakasone		
LDP	1,985,993 (33.2%)	7	31	Akio Sato		
LDP	1,985,993 (33.2%)	7	32	Kimichika Hyakutake		
LDP	1,985,993 (33.2%)	7	33	Yutaka Kanda		
CDP	1,317,457 (22.0%)	5	1	Kaichi Hasegawa	Gunma 3rd	80.8%
CDP	1,317,457 (22.0%)	5	1	Yuriko Yamakawa	Saitama 3rd	77.0%
CDP	1,317,457 (22.0%)	5	4	Keinin Horikoshi		
CDP	1,317,457 (22.0%)	5	5	Masako Ōkawara		
CDP	1,317,457 (22.0%)	5	6	Rentaro Takagi		
KnT	1,154,154 (19.3%)	4	1	Toshikazu Morita	Saitama 12th	99.4%
KnT	1,154,154 (19.3%)	4	1	Yamato Aoyama	Ibaraki 6th	94.3%
KnT	1,154,154 (19.3%)	4	1	Satoshi Asano	Ibaraki 5th	91.3%
KnT	1,154,154 (19.3%)	4	1	Yasuko Komiyama	Saitama 7th	86.1%
Komei	784,761 (13.1%)	2	1	Keiichi Ishii		
Komei	784,761 (13.1%)	2	2	Mitsunari Okamoto		
JCP	449,625 (7.5%)	1	1	Tetsuya Shiokawa		

== Southern Kanto block ==
2017 Japanese general election in Southern Kanto
- 22 October 2017

All 55 seats to the House of Representatives
	Majority party	Minority party	Third party
Party	LDP	CDP	Kibō no Tō
Last election	32 seats	New	14 seats
Constituency	25	3	1
PR seats	8	5	4
Total	33	8	5
Seat change	▲1	▲8	▼9
	Fourth party	Fifth party	Sixth party
Party	Komeito	JCP	Ishin
Last election	4 seats	3 seats	New
Constituency	0	0	0
PR seats	2	2	1
Total	2	2	1
Seat change	▼2	▼1	▲1
	Seventh party
Party	Ind.
Last election	2 seats
Constituency	0
PR seats	–
Total	4
Seat change	▲2

Single-member constituency results in Southern Kanto
Constituency	Previous member		Elected member		Votes	%	Margin	Runner-up		%	Status
Chiba 1st	Kaname Tajima	KnT	Hiroaki Kadoyama	LDP	82,838	40.7	1,357	Kaname Tajima	KnT	40.0	LDP gain from KnT
Chiba 2nd	Takayuki Kobayashi	LDP	Takayuki Kobayashi	LDP	108,964	48.8	54,929	Hiroyasu Higuchi	CDP	24.2	LDP hold
Chiba 3rd	Hirokazu Matsuno	LDP	Hirokazu Matsuno	LDP	85,461	53.3	33,443	Kazumasa Okajima	CDP	32.4	LDP hold
Chiba 4th	Yoshihiko Noda	Ind.	Yoshihiko Noda	Ind.	131,024	59.6	69,220	Tetsuya Kimura	LDP	28.1	Ind. hold
Chiba 5th	Kentaro Sonoura	LDP	Kentaro Sonoura	LDP	107,299	51.0	44,405	Atsushi Yamada	CDP	29.9	LDP hold
Chiba 6th	Hiromichi Watanabe	LDP	Hiromichi Watanabe	LDP	76,323	43.5	11,042	Yukio Ubukata	CDP	37.2	LDP hold
Chiba 7th	Ken Saitō	LDP	Ken Saitō	LDP	115,731	54.5	63,955	Sadamichi Ishizuka	CDP	24.4	LDP hold
Chiba 8th	Yoshitaka Sakurada	LDP	Yoshitaka Sakurada	LDP	100,115	48.8	28,647	Kazumi Ota	KnT	34.8	LDP hold
Chiba 9th	Masatoshi Akimoto	LDP	Masatoshi Akimoto	LDP	92,180	46.8	15,848	Soichiro Okuno	KnT	38.7	LDP hold
Chiba 10th	Motoo Hayashi	LDP	Motoo Hayashi	LDP	88,398	53.1	23,142	Hajime Yatagawa	KnT	39.2	LDP hold
Chiba 11th	Eisuke Mori	LDP	Eisuke Mori	LDP	103,919	60.0	58,574	Ryo Tagaya	KnT	26.2	LDP hold
Chiba 12th	Yasukazu Hamada	LDP	Yasukazu Hamada	LDP	120,075	63.4	83,504	Takeshi Hidaka	KnT	19.3	LDP hold
Chiba 13th	Takaki Shirasuka	LDP	Takaki Shirasuka	LDP	93,081	45.8	36,560	Shin Miyakawa	CDP	28.3	LDP hold
Kanagawa 1st	Jun Matsumoto	LDP	Jun Matsumoto	LDP	103,070	47.8	25,051	Go Shinohara	CDP	36.2	LDP hold
Kanagawa 2nd	Yoshihide Suga	LDP	Yoshihide Suga	LDP	123,218	57.1	76,027	Noe Takahashi	CDP	21.9	LDP hold
Kanagawa 3rd	Hachiro Okonogi	LDP	Hachiro Okonogi	LDP	101,157	50.2	54,873	Koichiro Katsumata	KnT	23.0	LDP hold
Kanagawa 4th	Keiichiro Asao	Ind.	Yuki Waseda	CDP	67,020	34.8	11,320	Tomohiro Yamamoto	LDP	28.9	CDP gain from Ind.
Kanagawa 5th	Manabu Sakai	LDP	Manabu Sakai	LDP	120,068	51.6	52,983	Kenji Yoshioka	KnT	28.8	LDP hold
Kanagawa 6th	Isamu Ueda	Komei	Yoichiro Aoyagi	CDP	86,291	44.6	3,503	Isamu Ueda	Komei	42.8	CDP gain from Komei
Kanagawa 7th	Keisuke Suzuki	LDP	Keisuke Suzuki	LDP	103,324	47.0	15,505	Kazuma Nakatani	CDP	39.9	LDP hold
Kanagawa 8th	Kenji Eda	Ind.	Kenji Eda	Ind.	119,280	54.2	45,161	Hidehiro Mitani	LDP	33.7	Ind. hold
Kanagawa 9th	Hirofumi Ryu	KnT	Hirofumi Ryu	KnT	72,531	41.3	1,712	Norihiro Nakayama	LDP	40.3	KnT hold
Kanagawa 10th	Kazunori Tanaka	LDP	Kazunori Tanaka	LDP	113,824	51.5	55,771	Yoshiko Ichikawa	KnT	26.2	LDP hold
Kanagawa 11th	Shinjirō Koizumi	LDP	Shinjirō Koizumi	LDP	154,761	78.0	132,887	Kazuhiro Seto	JCP	11.0	LDP hold
Kanagawa 12th	Tsuyoshi Hoshino	LDP	Tomoko Abe	CDP	86,550	43.2	2,626	Tsuyoshi Hoshino	LDP	41.9	CDP gain from LDP
Kanagawa 13th	Akira Amari	LDP	Akira Amari	LDP	127,214	56.1	64,435	Hideshi Futori	KnT	27.7	LDP hold
Kanagawa 14th	Jiro Akama	LDP	Jiro Akama	LDP	105,953	46.5	11,605	Kentaro Motomura	KnT	41.4	LDP hold
Kanagawa 15th	Taro Kono	LDP	Taro Kono	LDP	159,647	67.6	121,405	Katsumi Sasaki	SDP	16.2	LDP hold
Kanagawa 16th	Yuichi Goto	KnT	Hiroyuki Yoshiie	LDP	110,508	46.9	14,380	Yuichi Goto	KnT	40.8	LDP gain from KnT
Kanagawa 17th	Karen Makishima	LDP	Karen Makishima	LDP	117,003	51.3	33,596	Yosuke Kamiyama	KnT	36.5	LDP hold
Kanagawa 18th	Daishiro Yamagiwa	LDP	Daishiro Yamagiwa	LDP	111,285	51.1	45,228	Kazuya Mimura	KnT	30.4	LDP hold
Yamanashi 1st	Katsuhito Nakajima	Ind.	Katsuhito Nakajima	Ind.	107,007	44.3	1,131	Shinichi Nakatani	LDP	43.9	Ind. hold
Yamanashi 2nd	Kotaro Nagasaki	Ind.	Noriko Horiuchi	Ind.	70,532	40.1	3,098	Kotaro Nagasaki	Ind.	38.4	Ind. gain from Ind.

Proportional representation results
Party	Votes	Seats	Rank	Elected member	Constituency	Ratio
LDP	2,356,614 (34.3%)	8	1	Noriko Miyagawa		
LDP	2,356,614 (34.3%)	8	2	Shinichi Nakatani	Yamanashi 1st	98.9%
LDP	2,356,614 (34.3%)	8	2	Norihiro Nakayama	Kanagawa 9th	97.6%
LDP	2,356,614 (34.3%)	8	2	Tsuyoshi Hoshino	Kanagawa 12th	97.0%
LDP	2,356,614 (34.3%)	8	2	Tomohiro Yamamoto	Kanagawa 4th	83.1%
LDP	2,356,614 (34.3%)	8	2	Hidehiro Mitani	Kanagawa 8th	62.1%
LDP	2,356,614 (34.3%)	8	2	Tetsuya Kimura	Chiba 4th	47.2%
LDP	2,356,614 (34.3%)	8	32	Hiroshi Ueno		
CDP	1,612,425 (23.5%)	5	1	Yukio Ubukata	Chiba 6th	85.5%
CDP	1,612,425 (23.5%)	5	1	Kazuma Nakatani	Kanagawa 7th	85.0%
CDP	1,612,425 (23.5%)	5	1	Go Shinohara	Kanagawa 1st	75.7%
CDP	1,612,425 (23.5%)	5	1	Shin Miyakawa	Chiba 13th	61.7%
CDP	1,612,425 (23.5%)	5	1	Kazumasa Okajima	Chiba 3rd	60.9%
KnT	1,184,103 (17.2%)	4	1	Kaname Tajima	Chiba 1st	98.4%
KnT	1,184,103 (17.2%)	4	1	Kentaro Motomura	Kanagawa 14th	89.0%
KnT	1,184,103 (17.2%)	4	1	Yuichi Goto	Kanagawa 16th	87.0%
KnT	1,184,103 (17.2%)	4	1	Soichiro Okuno	Chiba 9th	82.8%
Komei	787,461 (11.5%)	2	1	Shigeyuki Tomita		
Komei	787,461 (11.5%)	2	2	Noriko Furuya		
JCP	550,404 (8.0%)	2	1	Kazuo Shii		
JCP	550,404 (8.0%)	2	2	Kimie Hatano		
Ishin	269,274 (3.9%)	1	1	Seiichi Kushida	Kanagawa 6th	28.3%

== Tokyo block ==
2017 Japanese general election in Tokyo
- 22 October 2017

All 42 seats to the House of Representatives
	Majority party	Minority party	Third party
Party	LDP	CDP	Kibō no Tō
Last election	28 seats	New	8 seats
Constituency	19	4	1
PR seats	6	4	3
Total	25	8	4
Seat change	▼3	▲8	▼4
	Fourth party	Fifth party
Party	Komeito	JCP
Last election	3 seats	3 seats
Constituency	1	0
PR seats	2	2
Total	3	2
Seat change	0	▼1

Single-member constituency results in Tokyo
Constituency	Previous member		Elected member		Votes	%	Margin	Runner-up		%	Status
Tokyo 1st	Miki Yamada	LDP	Banri Kaieda	CDP	96,255	40.7	3,021	Miki Yamada	LDP	39.4	CDP gain from LDP
Tokyo 2nd	Kiyoto Tsuji	LDP	Kiyoto Tsuji	LDP	112,993	45.9	21,763	Akihiro Matsuo	CDP	37.1	LDP hold
Tokyo 3rd	Hirotaka Ishihara	LDP	Hirotaka Ishihara	LDP	107,708	43.6	13,328	Jin Matsubara	KnT	38.2	LDP hold
Tokyo 4th	Masaaki Taira	LDP	Masaaki Taira	LDP	115,239	50.1	61,759	Masae Ido	CDP	23.2	LDP hold
Tokyo 5th	Kenji Wakamiya	LDP	Kenji Wakamiya	LDP	101,314	41.1	2,132	Yoshio Tezuka	CDP	40.3	LDP hold
Tokyo 6th	Takao Ochi	LDP	Takayuki Ochiai	CDP	100,400	40.8	1,978	Takao Ochi	LDP	40.0	CDP gain from LDP
Tokyo 7th	Akira Nagatsuma	CDP	Akira Nagatsuma	CDP	117,118	50.5	31,813	Fumiaki Matsumoto	LDP	36.8	CDP hold
Tokyo 8th	Nobuteru Ishihara	LDP	Nobuteru Ishihara	LDP	99,863	39.2	23,580	Harumi Yoshida	CDP	30.0	LDP hold
Tokyo 9th	Isshu Sugawara	LDP	Isshu Sugawara	LDP	122,279	49.2	57,548	Satoshi Takamatsu	KnT	26.0	LDP hold
Tokyo 10th	Masaru Wakasa	KnT	Hayato Suzuki	LDP	91,146	37.4	20,978	Yosuke Suzuki	CDP	28.8	LDP gain from KnT
Tokyo 11th	Hakubun Shimomura	LDP	Hakubun Shimomura	LDP	104,612	44.9	44,321	Junichiro Maeda	CDP	25.9	LDP hold
Tokyo 12th	Akihiro Ota	Komei	Akihiro Ota	Komei	112,597	51.6	29,053	Saori Ikeuchi	JCP	38.3	Komei hold
Tokyo 13th	Ichirō Kamoshita	LDP	Ichirō Kamoshita	LDP	120,744	55.2	53,674	Tomohiko Kitajo	CDP	30.7	LDP hold
Tokyo 14th	Midori Matsushima	LDP	Midori Matsushima	LDP	104,137	46.9	40,902	Asako Yahagi	KnT	28.5	LDP hold
Tokyo 15th	Mito Kakizawa	KnT	Tsukasa Akimoto	LDP	101,155	45.5	30,830	Mito Kakizawa	KnT	31.7	LDP gain from KnT
Tokyo 16th	Hideo Ōnishi	LDP	Hideo Ōnishi	LDP	84,457	40.9	13,052	Akihiro Hatsushika	CDP	34.6	LDP hold
Tokyo 17th	Katsuei Hirasawa	LDP	Katsuei Hirasawa	LDP	127,632	57.9	78,147	Chikara Nishida	KnT	22.5	LDP hold
Tokyo 18th	Masatada Tsuchiya	LDP	Naoto Kan	CDP	96,713	40.7	1,046	Masatada Tsuchiya	LDP	40.3	CDP gain from LDP
Tokyo 19th	Yohei Matsumoto	LDP	Yohei Matsumoto	LDP	96,229	41.1	5,689	Yoshinori Suematsu	CDP	38.7	LDP hold
Tokyo 20th	Seiji Kihara	LDP	Seiji Kihara	LDP	107,686	49.9	49,945	Toru Miyamoto	JCP	26.7	LDP hold
Tokyo 21st	Kiyoshi Odawara	LDP	Akihisa Nagashima	KnT	92,356	41.0	4,131	Kiyoshi Odawara	LDP	39.1	KnT gain from LDP
Tokyo 22nd	Tatsuya Ito	LDP	Tatsuya Ito	LDP	110,493	43.4	19,420	Ikuo Yamahana	CDP	35.8	LDP hold
Tokyo 23rd	Masanobu Ogura	LDP	Masanobu Ogura	LDP	110,522	44.9	34,072	Shunsuke Ito	KnT	31.1	LDP hold
Tokyo 24th	Kōichi Hagiuda	LDP	Kōichi Hagiuda	LDP	122,331	49.3	60,890	Narihisa Takahashi	CDP	24.8	LDP hold
Tokyo 25th	Shinji Inoue	LDP	Shinji Inoue	LDP	112,014	51.8	67,130	Yoko Yamashita	CDP	20.8	LDP hold

Proportional representation results
Party	Votes	Seats	Rank	Elected member	Constituency	Ratio
LDP	1,816,184 (30.5%)	6	1	Takao Ochi	Tokyo 6th	98.0%
LDP	1,816,184 (30.5%)	6	1	Miki Yamada	Tokyo 1st	96.7%
LDP	1,816,184 (30.5%)	6	1	Kiyoshi Odawara	Tokyo 21st	95.5%
LDP	1,816,184 (30.5%)	6	1	Fumiaki Matsumoto	Tokyo 7th	72.8%
LDP	1,816,184 (30.5%)	6	24	Takao Ando		
LDP	1,816,184 (30.5%)	6	25	Kei Takagi		
CDP	1,405,836 (23.6%)	4	1	Yoshio Tezuka	Tokyo 5th	97.9%
CDP	1,405,836 (23.6%)	4	1	Yoshinori Suematsu	Tokyo 19th	94.1%
CDP	1,405,836 (23.6%)	4	1	Akihiro Hatsushika	Tokyo 16th	84.5%
CDP	1,405,836 (23.6%)	4	1	Ikuo Yamahana	Tokyo 22nd	82.4%
KnT	1,039,647 (17.4%)	3	1	Jin Matsubara	Tokyo 3rd	87.6%
KnT	1,039,647 (17.4%)	3	1	Mito Kakizawa	Tokyo 15th	69.5%
KnT	1,039,647 (17.4%)	3	1	Shunsuke Ito	Tokyo 23rd	69.2%
Komei	644,634 (10.8%)	2	1	Yōsuke Takagi		
Komei	644,634 (10.8%)	2	2	Michiyo Takagi		
JCP	618,332 (10.4%)	2	1	Akira Kasai		
JCP	618,332 (10.4%)	2	2	Toru Miyamoto		

== Hokuriku-Shin'etsu block ==
2017 Japanese general election in Hokuriku-Shin'etsu
- 22 October 2017

All 30 seats to the House of Representatives
	Majority party	Minority party	Third party
Party	LDP	Kibō no Tō	CDP
Last election	21 seats	7 seats	New
Constituency	12	2	1
PR seats	5	2	2
Total	17	4	3
Seat change	▼4	▼3	▲3
	Fourth party	Fifth party	Sixth party
Party	Komeito	JCP	Ind.
Last election	1 seat	1 seat	0 seats
Constituency	0	0	4
PR seats	1	1	–
Total	1	1	4
Seat change	0	0	▲4

Single-member constituency results in Hokuriku-Shin'etsu
Constituency	Previous member		Elected member		Votes	%	Margin	Runner-up		%	Status
Niigata 1st	Toru Ishizaki	LDP	Chinami Nishimura	CDP	128,045	53.1	15,000	Toru Ishizaki	LDP	46.9	CDP gain from LDP
Niigata 2nd	Kenichi Hosoda	LDP	Eiichiro Washio	Ind.	97,808	51.6	16,103	Kenichi Hosoda	LDP	43.1	Ind. gain from LDP
Niigata 3rd	Takahiro Kuroiwa	Ind.	Takahiro Kuroiwa	Ind.	95,644	49.1	50	Hiroaki Saito	LDP	49.1	Ind. hold
Niigata 4th	Megumi Kaneko	LDP	Makiko Kikuta	Ind.	112,600	56.3	25,076	Megumi Kaneko	LDP	43.7	Ind. gain from LDP
Niigata 5th	Vacant	LDP	Hirohiko Izumida	LDP	91,855	51.8	12,200	Etsuko Odaira	Ind.	44.9	LDP hold
Niigata 6th	Shuichi Takatori	LDP	Shuichi Takatori	LDP	94,292	50.6	2,212	Mamoru Umetani	Ind.	49.4	LDP hold
Toyama 1st	Hiroaki Tabata	LDP	Hiroaki Tabata	LDP	74,876	59.2	36,657	Toyofumi Yoshida	Ishin	30.2	LDP hold
Toyama 2nd	Mitsuhiro Miyakoshi	LDP	Mitsuhiro Miyakoshi	LDP	94,086	74.4	61,738	Akira Yamazaki	SDP	25.6	LDP hold
Toyama 3rd	Keiichiro Tachibana	LDP	Keiichiro Tachibana	LDP	140,803	63.9	78,737	Shibata Takumi	KnT	28.2	LDP hold
Ishikawa 1st	Hiroshi Hase	LDP	Hiroshi Hase	LDP	112,168	59.1	50,627	Mieko Tanaka	KnT	32.4	LDP hold
Ishikawa 2nd	Hajime Sasaki	LDP	Hajime Sasaki	LDP	118,421	62.3	60,257	Miki Shibata	KnT	30.6	LDP hold
Ishikawa 3rd	Shigeo Kitamura	LDP	Shoji Nishida	LDP	80,416	49.1	2,110	Kazuya Kondo	KnT	47.8	LDP hold
Fukui 1st	Tomomi Inada	LDP	Tomomi Inada	LDP	116,969	57.4	52,883	Koji Suzuki	KnT	31.4	LDP hold
Fukui 2nd	Tsuyoshi Takagi	LDP	Tsuyoshi Takagi	LDP	80,895	54.2	25,358	Takeshi Saiki	KnT	37.2	LDP hold
Nagano 1st	Takashi Shinohara	Ind.	Takashi Shinohara	Ind.	131,883	54.1	46,423	Yutaka Komatsu	LDP	35.0	Ind. hold
Nagano 2nd	Shunsuke Mutai	LDP	Mitsu Shimojo	KnT	78,343	35.5	11,133	Shunsuke Mutai	LDP	30.4	KnT gain from LDP
Nagano 3rd	Yosei Ide	KnT	Yosei Ide	KnT	127,542	53.1	52,820	Hitoshi Kiuchi	LDP	31.1	KnT hold
Nagano 4th	Shigeyuki Goto	LDP	Shigeyuki Goto	LDP	68,673	45.6	27,775	Eiko Mouri	JCP	27.2	LDP hold
Nagano 5th	Ichiro Miyashita	LDP	Ichiro Miyashita	LDP	91,542	49.9	42,954	Itsuro Soga	Ind.	26.5	LDP hold

Proportional representation results
Party	Votes	Seats	Rank	Elected member	Constituency	Ratio
LDP	1,328,838 (37.1%)	5	1	Taku Yamamoto		
LDP	1,328,838 (37.1%)	5	2	Hiroaki Saito	Niigata 3rd	99.9%
LDP	1,328,838 (37.1%)	5	2	Toru Ishizaki	Niigata 1st	88.3%
LDP	1,328,838 (37.1%)	5	2	Shunsuke Mutai	Nagano 2nd	85.8%
LDP	1,328,838 (37.1%)	5	2	Kenichi Hosoda	Niigata 2nd	83.5%
CDP	699,426 (19.5%)	2	2	Koichi Matsudaira		
CDP	699,426 (19.5%)	2	3	Wakako Yamamoto		
KnT	688,924 (19.2%)	2	1	Kazuya Kondo	Ishikawa 3rd	97.4%
KnT	688,924 (19.2%)	2	1	Takeshi Saiki	Fukui 2nd	68.7%
Komei	318,050 (8.9%)	1	1	Masataka Ota		
JCP	267,777 (7.5%)	1	1	Yasufumi Fujino		

== Tokai block ==
2017 Japanese general election in Tokai
- 22 October 2017

All 53 seats to the House of Representatives
	Majority party	Minority party	Third party
Party	LDP	Kibō no Tō	CDP
Last election	30 seats	19 seats	New
Constituency	21	5	2
PR seats	8	5	4
Total	29	10	6
Seat change	▼1	▼9	▲6
	Fourth party	Fifth party	Sixth party
Party	Komeito	JCP	Ishin
Last election	3 seats	2 seats	New
Constituency	0	0	0
PR seats	2	1	1
Total	2	1	1
Seat change	▼1	▼1	▲1
	Seventh party
Party	Ind.
Last election	0 seats
Constituency	4
PR seats	–
Total	4
Seat change	▲4

Single-member constituency results in Tokai
Constituency	Previous member		Elected member		Votes	%	Margin	Runner-up		%	Status
Gifu 1st	Seiko Noda	LDP	Seiko Noda	LDP	103,453	64.5	59,675	Rie Yoshida	Ind.	27.2	LDP hold
Gifu 2nd	Yasufumi Tanahashi	LDP	Yasufumi Tanahashi	LDP	117,278	75.4	79,008	Fusayoshi Morizakura	JCP	24.6	LDP hold
Gifu 3rd	Yoji Muto	LDP	Yoji Muto	LDP	127,308	56.9	58,904	Naoto Sakaguchi	KnT	30.6	LDP hold
Gifu 4th	Kazuyoshi Kaneko	LDP	Shunpei Kaneko	LDP	107,473	49.2	15,103	Masato Imai	KnT	42.3	LDP hold
Gifu 5th	Keiji Furuya	LDP	Keiji Furuya	LDP	92,113	54.1	34,131	Yoshinobu Achiha	KnT	34.0	LDP hold
Shizuoka 1st	Yōko Kamikawa	LDP	Yōko Kamikawa	LDP	96,500	46.9	40,414	Masanari Koike	KnT	27.2	LDP hold
Shizuoka 2nd	Tatsunori Ibayashi	LDP	Tatsunori Ibayashi	LDP	130,857	57.2	55,086	Tsutomu Matsuo	KnT	33.1	LDP hold
Shizuoka 3rd	Hiroyuki Miyazawa	LDP	Hiroyuki Miyazawa	LDP	97,923	44.5	16,355	Nobuhiro Koyama	Ind.	37.1	LDP hold
Shizuoka 4th	Yoshio Mochizuki	LDP	Yoshio Mochizuki	LDP	96,243	55.9	38,662	Ken Tanaka	KnT	33.4	LDP hold
Shizuoka 5th	Goshi Hosono	KnT	Goshi Hosono	KnT	137,523	54.8	45,056	Takeru Yoshikawa	LDP	36.9	KnT hold
Shizuoka 6th	Shu Watanabe	KnT	Shu Watanabe	KnT	108,788	46.0	631	Takaaki Katsumata	LDP	45.8	KnT hold
Shizuoka 7th	Minoru Kiuchi	LDP	Minoru Kiuchi	LDP	129,463	65.8	99,558	Takashi Fukumura	KnT	15.2	LDP hold
Shizuoka 8th	Ryū Shionoya	LDP	Ryū Shionoya	LDP	101,858	50.9	23,334	Kentaro Genma	KnT	39.3	LDP hold
Aichi 1st	Hiromichi Kumada	LDP	Hiromichi Kumada	LDP	74,298	41.1	16,518	Tsunehiko Yoshida	CDP	32.0	LDP hold
Aichi 2nd	Motohisa Furukawa	KnT	Motohisa Furukawa	KnT	99,520	50.1	27,920	Tsuyoshi Tabata	LDP	36.1	KnT hold
Aichi 3rd	Shoichi Kondo	CDP	Shoichi Kondo	CDP	98,595	46.9	22,375	Yoshitaka Ikeda	LDP	36.2	CDP hold
Aichi 4th	Shōzō Kudō	LDP	Shōzō Kudō	LDP	76,446	45.1	13,239	Yoshio Maki	KnT	37.3	LDP hold
Aichi 5th	Hirotaka Akamatsu	CDP	Hirotaka Akamatsu	CDP	91,081	46.5	18,430	Kenji Kanda	LDP	37.1	CDP hold
Aichi 6th	Hideki Niwa	LDP	Hideki Niwa	LDP	114,894	50.8	39,825	Kazuyoshi Morimoto	KnT	33.2	LDP hold
Aichi 7th	Shiori Yamao	Ind.	Shiori Yamao	Ind.	128,163	50.2	834	Junji Suzuki	LDP	49.8	Ind. hold
Aichi 8th	Tadahiko Ito	LDP	Tadahiko Ito	LDP	108,477	46.2	1,852	Yutaka Banno	Ind.	45.4	LDP hold
Aichi 9th	Yasumasa Nagasaka	LDP	Yasumasa Nagasaka	LDP	104,419	47.5	14,511	Mitsunori Okamoto	KnT	40.9	LDP hold
Aichi 10th	Tetsuma Esaki	LDP	Tetsuma Esaki	LDP	88,171	39.0	21,611	Misako Yasui	KnT	29.4	LDP hold
Aichi 11th	Shinichiro Furumoto	KnT	Shinichiro Furumoto	KnT	134,698	53.8	37,720	Tetsuya Yagi	LDP	38.7	KnT hold
Aichi 12th	Kazuhiko Shigetoku	Ind.	Kazuhiko Shigetoku	Ind.	149,587	55.7	44,776	Shuhei Aoyama	LDP	39.0	Ind. hold
Aichi 13th	Kensuke Onishi	KnT	Kensuke Onishi	KnT	116,471	47.4	6,890	Sei Oomi	LDP	44.6	KnT hold
Aichi 14th	Soichiro Imaeda	LDP	Soichiro Imaeda	LDP	96,303	55.3	35,348	Katsunori Tanaka	KnT	35.0	LDP hold
Aichi 15th	Yukinori Nemoto	LDP	Yukinori Nemoto	LDP	95,568	49.9	18,344	Kenichiro Seki	KnT	40.4	LDP hold
Mie 1st	Jirō Kawasaki	LDP	Norihisa Tamura	LDP	109,584	53.8	15,539	Naohisa Matsuda	Ind.	46.2	LDP hold
Mie 2nd	Masaharu Nakagawa	Ind.	Masaharu Nakagawa	Ind.	122,518	53.9	17,738	Jirō Kawasaki	LDP	46.1	Ind. hold
Mie 3rd	Katsuya Okada	Ind.	Katsuya Okada	Ind.	147,255	64.3	83,849	Yoshikazu Shimada	LDP	27.7	Ind. hold
Mie 4th	Norihisa Tamura	LDP	Norio Mitsuya	LDP	99,596	54.0	30,618	Daisuke Fujita	KnT	37.4	LDP hold
Mie 5th	Norio Mitsuya	LDP	Seat abolished								LDP loss

Proportional representation results
Party	Votes	Seats	Rank	Elected member	Constituency	Ratio
LDP	2,237,838 (33.2%)	7 → 8	1	Takaaki Katsumata	Shizuoka 6th	99.4%
LDP	2,237,838 (33.2%)	7 → 8	1	Junji Suzuki	Aichi 7th	99.3%
LDP	2,237,838 (33.2%)	7 → 8	1	Sei Oomi	Aichi 13th	94.1%
LDP	2,237,838 (33.2%)	7 → 8	1	Jirō Kawasaki	Mie 2nd	85.5%
LDP	2,237,838 (33.2%)	7 → 8	1	Kenji Kanda	Aichi 5th	79.8%
LDP	2,237,838 (33.2%)	7 → 8	1	Yoshitaka Ikeda	Aichi 3rd	77.3%
LDP	2,237,838 (33.2%)	7 → 8	1	Tetsuya Yagi	Aichi 11th	72.0%
LDP	2,237,838 (33.2%)	7 → 8	1	Tsuyoshi Tabata	Aichi 2nd	71.9%
KnT	1,445,549 (21.5%)	5	1	Mitsunori Okamoto	Aichi 9th	86.1%
KnT	1,445,549 (21.5%)	5	1	Masato Imai	Gifu 4th	85.9%
KnT	1,445,549 (21.5%)	5	1	Yoshio Maki	Aichi 4th	82.7%
KnT	1,445,549 (21.5%)	5	1	Kenichiro Seki	Aichi 15th	80.8%
KnT	1,445,549 (21.5%)	5	1	Kentaro Genma	Shizuoka 8th	77.1%
CDP	1,418,633 (21.1%)	5 → 4 (Note: Forfeited one seat due to lack of candidates.)	1	Tsunehiko Yoshida	Aichi 1st	77.8%
CDP	1,418,633 (21.1%)	5 → 4	1	Masayuki Aoyama	Shizuoka 1st	39.9%
CDP	1,418,633 (21.1%)	5 → 4	1	Yuta Hiyoshi	Shizuoka 7th	20.4%
CDP	1,418,633 (21.1%)	5 → 4	6	Isao Matsuda		
Komei	781,228 (11.6%)	2	1	Yoshinori Oguchi		
Komei	781,228 (11.6%)	2	2	Wataru Ito		
JCP	450,970 (6.7%)	1	1	Nobuko Motomura		
Ishin	297,759 (4.4%)	1	1	Kazumi Sugimoto	Aichi 10th	50.2%

== Kinki block ==
2017 Japanese general election in Kinki
- 22 October 2017

All 75 seats to the House of Representatives
	Majority party	Minority party	Third party
Party	LDP	Komeito	Ishin
Last election	38 seats	10 seats	New
Constituency	33	6	3
PR seats	9	4	5
Total	42	10	8
Seat change	▲4	0	▲8
	Fourth party	Fifth party	Sixth party
Party	CDP	Kibō no Tō	JCP
Last election	New	24 seats	4 seats
Constituency	1	2	0
PR seats	5	3	2
Total	6	5	2
Seat change	▲6	▼19	▼2
	Seventh party
Party	Ind.
Last election	1 seat
Constituency	2
PR seats	–
Total	2
Seat change	▲1

Single-member constituency results in Kinki
Constituency	Previous member		Elected member		Votes	%	Margin	Runner-up		%	Status
Shiga 1st	Toshitaka Ōoka	LDP	Toshitaka Ōoka	LDP	84,994	47.7	5,270	Yukiko Kada	Ind.	44.7	LDP hold
Shiga 2nd	Kenichiro Ueno	LDP	Kenichiro Ueno	LDP	73,694	50.5	14,976	Issei Tajima	KnT	40.2	LDP hold
Shiga 3rd	Nobuhide Takemura	LDP	Nobuhide Takemura	LDP	78,724	55.3	30,706	Yasue Ogawa	KnT	33.8	LDP hold
Shiga 4th	Takaya Mutō	Ind.	Hiroo Kotera	LDP	80,114	47.8	15,497	Hisashi Tokunaga	KnT	38.5	LDP gain from Ind.
Kyoto 1st	Bunmei Ibuki	LDP	Bunmei Ibuki	LDP	88,106	47.3	26,168	Keiji Kokuta	JCP	33.3	LDP hold
Kyoto 2nd	Seiji Maehara	Ind.	Seiji Maehara	Ind.	65,480	48.7	25,144	Mamoru Shigemoto	LDP	30.0	Ind. hold
Kyoto 3rd	Kenta Izumi	KnT	Kenta Izumi	KnT	63,013	38.3	6,479	Yayoi Kimura	LDP	34.4	KnT hold
Kyoto 4th	Hideyuki Tanaka	LDP	Hideyuki Tanaka	LDP	83,286	42.5	12,218	Keiro Kitagami	KnT	36.2	LDP hold
Kyoto 5th	Sadakazu Tanigaki	LDP	Taro Honda	LDP	60,277	43.3	29,612	Yasushi Nakayama	Ind.	22.0	LDP hold
Kyoto 6th	Kazunori Yamanoi	KnT	Hiroshi Ando	LDP	101,977	43.0	1,639	Kazunori Yamanoi	KnT	42.3	LDP gain from KnT
Osaka 1st	Inoue Hidetaka	Ishin	Hiroyuki Onishi	LDP	67,748	37.6	1,242	Inoue Hidetaka	Ishin	36.9	LDP gain from Ishin
Osaka 2nd	ja	LDP	Akira Sato	LDP	91,439	43.9	22,595	Tamotsu Shiiki	Ishin	33.1	LDP hold
Osaka 3rd	Shigeki Sato	Komei	Shigeki Sato	Komei	83,907	54.1	28,949	Yui Watanabe	JCP	35.4	Komei hold
Osaka 4th	Yasuhide Nakayama	LDP	Yasuhide Nakayama	LDP	80,083	42.3	7,647	Teruo Minobe	Ishin	38.3	LDP hold
Osaka 5th	Tōru Kunishige	Komei	Tōru Kunishige	Komei	91,514	51.5	46,201	Hideki Nagao	CDP	25.5	Komei hold
Osaka 6th	Shinichi Isa	Komei	Shinichi Isa	Komei	104,052	61.0	37,516	Fumiyoshi Murakami	CDP	39.0	Komei hold
Osaka 7th	Naomi Tokashiki	LDP	Naomi Tokashiki	LDP	82,337	43.6	15,557	Takemitsu Okushita	Ishin	35.4	LDP hold
Osaka 8th	Takashi Ōtsuka	LDP	Takashi Ōtsuka	LDP	67,054	39.3	9,867	Tomohiko Kinoshita	Ishin	33.5	LDP hold
Osaka 9th	Kenji Harada	LDP	Kenji Harada	LDP	93,475	40.7	2,037	Yasushi Adachi	Ishin	39.8	LDP hold
Osaka 10th	Kiyomi Tsujimoto	CDP	Kiyomi Tsujimoto	CDP	75,788	42.8	19,305	Kazuhide Okuma	LDP	31.9	CDP hold
Osaka 11th	Yukari Sato	LDP	Hirofumi Hirano	Ind.	76,144	36.7	6,778	Yukari Sato	LDP	33.5	Ind. gain from LDP
Osaka 12th	Tomokatsu Kitagawa	LDP	Tomokatsu Kitagawa	LDP	71,614	45.0	7,084	Fumitake Fujita	Ishin	40.6	LDP hold
Osaka 13th	Koichi Munekiyo	LDP	Koichi Munekiyo	LDP	74,662	41.2	22,629	Yoshiaki Aono	Ishin	28.7	LDP hold
Osaka 14th	Takashi Tanihata	Ishin	Takashi Nagao	LDP	79,352	41.1	1,656	Takashi Tanihata	Ishin	40.2	LDP gain from Ishin
Osaka 15th	Naokazu Takemoto	LDP	Naokazu Takemoto	LDP	81,968	43.8	7,600	Yasuto Urano	Ishin	39.8	LDP hold
Osaka 16th	Kazuo Kitagawa	Komei	Kazuo Kitagawa	Komei	77,335	54.0	11,555	Hiroyuki Moriyama	CDP	46.0	Komei hold
Osaka 17th	Nobuyuki Baba	Ishin	Nobuyuki Baba	Ishin	65,427	43.5	6,893	Shohei Okashita	LDP	38.9	Ishin hold
Osaka 18th	Takashi Endo	Ishin	Takashi Endo	Ishin	87,070	44.3	6,872	Noboru Kamitani	LDP	40.8	Ishin hold
Osaka 19th	Hodaka Maruyama	Ishin	Hodaka Maruyama	Ishin	66,712	46.7	8,879	Tomu Tanigawa	LDP	40.5	Ishin hold
Hyogo 1st	Nobuhiko Isaka	KnT	Masahito Moriyama	LDP	71,861	39.4	12,670	Nobuhiko Isaka	KnT	32.5	LDP gain from KnT
Hyogo 2nd	Kazuyoshi Akaba	Komei	Kazuyoshi Akaba	Komei	89,349	52.5	48,111	Jiro Funakawa	Ind.	24.2	Komei hold
Hyogo 3rd	Yoshihiro Seki	LDP	Yoshihiro Seki	LDP	72,838	48.0	43,986	Kazuyuki Yokohata	KnT	19.0	LDP hold
Hyogo 4th	Hisayuki Fujii	LDP	Hisayuki Fujii	LDP	120,189	57.9	82,845	Takemitsu Noguchi	KnT	18.0	LDP hold
Hyogo 5th	Koichi Tani	LDP	Koichi Tani	LDP	123,360	56.9	53,991	Yasuhiro Kajiwara	KnT	32.0	LDP hold
Hyogo 6th	Masaki Ogushi	LDP	Masaki Ogushi	LDP	93,622	41.8	23,744	Shu Sakurai	CDP	31.2	LDP hold
Hyogo 7th	Kenji Yamada	LDP	Kenji Yamada	LDP	95,558	44.5	54,227	Kē Miki	Ishin	19.2	LDP hold
Hyogo 8th	Hiromasa Nakano	Komei	Hiromasa Nakano	Komei	94,116	63.6	40,152	Terufumi Horiuchi	JCP	36.4	Komei hold
Hyogo 9th	Yasutoshi Nishimura	LDP	Yasutoshi Nishimura	LDP	122,026	69.5	91,089	Yasushi Kawato	KnT	17.6	LDP hold
Hyogo 10th	Kisaburo Tokai	LDP	Kisaburo Tokai	LDP	94,205	59.9	56,133	Atsuhito Tsuge	KnT	24.2	LDP hold
Hyogo 11th	Takeaki Matsumoto	LDP	Takeaki Matsumoto	LDP	109,381	65.3	71,598	Takashi Nagayasu	KnT	22.6	LDP hold
Hyogo 12th	Tsuyoshi Yamaguchi	LDP	Tsuyoshi Yamaguchi	LDP	98,166	62.8	59,778	Kotaro Ikehata	KnT	24.6	LDP hold
Nara 1st	Sumio Mabuchi	KnT	Shigeki Kobayashi	LDP	90,558	40.8	2,476	Sumio Mabuchi	KnT	39.7	LDP gain from KnT
Nara 2nd	Sanae Takaichi	LDP	Sanae Takaichi	LDP	124,508	60.1	72,124	Masayuki Matsumoto	KnT	25.3	LDP hold
Nara 3rd	Shinsuke Okuno	LDP	Taido Tanose	LDP	122,341	61.6	66,620	Kiyoshige Maekawa	KnT	28.1	LDP hold
Nara 4th	Taido Tanose	LDP	Seat abolished								LDP loss
Wakayama 1st	Shūhei Kishimoto	KnT	Shūhei Kishimoto	KnT	72,517	50.4	15,406	Hirofumi Kado	LDP	39.7	KnT hold
Wakayama 2nd	Masatoshi Ishida	LDP	Masatoshi Ishida	LDP	75,772	58.3	54,377	Takanori Sakata	KnT	16.5	LDP hold
Wakayama 3rd	Toshihiro Nikai	LDP	Toshihiro Nikai	LDP	109,488	72.9	68,880	Fumirou Kusumoto	JCP	27.1	LDP hold

Proportional representation results
Party	Votes	Seats	Rank	Elected member	Constituency	Ratio
LDP	2,586,424 (30.6%)	9	1	Shinsuke Okuno		
LDP	2,586,424 (30.6%)	9	2	Noboru Kamitani	Osaka 18th	92.1%
LDP	2,586,424 (30.6%)	9	2	Yukari Sato	Osaka 11th	91.1%
LDP	2,586,424 (30.6%)	9	2	Yayoi Kimura	Kyoto 3rd	89.7%
LDP	2,586,424 (30.6%)	9	2	Shohei Okashita	Osaka 17th	89.5%
LDP	2,586,424 (30.6%)	9	2	Tomu Tanigawa	Osaka 19th	86.7%
LDP	2,586,424 (30.6%)	9	2	Hirofumi Kado	Wakayama 1st	78.8%
LDP	2,586,424 (30.6%)	9	2	Kazuhide Okuma	Osaka 10th	74.5%
LDP	2,586,424 (30.6%)	9	2	Mamoru Shigemoto	Kyoto 2nd	61.6%
Ishin	1,544,821 (18.3%)	5	1	Natsue Mori	Kyoto 3rd	26.2%
Ishin	1,544,821 (18.3%)	5	2	Inoue Hidetaka	Osaka 1st	98.2%
Ishin	1,544,821 (18.3%)	5	2	Takashi Tanihata	Osaka 14th	97.9%
Ishin	1,544,821 (18.3%)	5	2	Yasushi Adachi	Osaka 9th	97.8%
Ishin	1,544,821 (18.3%)	5	2	Yasuto Urano	Osaka 15th	90.7%
CDP	1,335,630 (15.8%)	5	1	Hiroyuki Moriyama	Osaka 16th	85.1%
CDP	1,335,630 (15.8%)	5	1	Shu Sakurai	Hyogo 6th	74.6%
CDP	1,335,630 (15.8%)	5	1	Fumiyoshi Murakami	Osaka 6th	63.9%
CDP	1,335,630 (15.8%)	5	1	Kanako Otsuji	Osaka 2nd	52.5%
CDP	1,335,630 (15.8%)	5	1	Hideki Nagao	Osaka 5th	49.5%
Komei	1,164,995 (13.8%)	4	1	Yuzuru Takeuchi		
Komei	1,164,995 (13.8%)	4	2	Tomoko Ukishima		
Komei	1,164,995 (13.8%)	4	3	Susumu Hamamura		
Komei	1,164,995 (13.8%)	4	4	Yoko Wanibuchi		
KnT	913,860 (10.8%)	3	1	Shinji Tarutoko		
KnT	913,860 (10.8%)	3	2	Kazunori Inoue	Kyoto 5th	32.5%
KnT	913,860 (10.8%)	3	3	Kazunori Yamanoi	Kyoto 6th	98.4%
JCP	786,158 (9.3%)	2	1	Keiji Kokuta	Kyoto 1st	70.3%
JCP	786,158 (9.3%)	2	2	Takeshi Miyamoto		

== Chugoku block ==
2017 Japanese general election in Chugoku
- 22 October 2017

All 31 seats to the House of Representatives
	Majority party	Minority party	Third party
Party	LDP	Kibō no Tō	CDP
Last election	23 seats	3 seats	New
Constituency	18	1	0
PR seats	5	2	2
Total	23	3	2
Seat change	0	0	▲2
	Fourth party	Fifth party	Sixth party
Party	Komeito	JCP	Ind.
Last election	2 seats	1 seat	1 seat
Constituency	0	0	1
PR seats	2	0	–
Total	2	0	1
Seat change	0	▼1	0

Single-member constituency results in Chugoku
Constituency	Previous member		Elected member		Votes	%	Margin	Runner-up		%	Status
Tottori 1st	Shigeru Ishiba	LDP	Shigeru Ishiba	LDP	106,425	83.6	85,596	Naruyuki Tsukada	JCP	16.4	LDP hold
Tottori 2nd	Ryosei Akazawa	LDP	Ryosei Akazawa	LDP	72,827	53.4	19,515	Shinji Yuhara	KnT	39.1	LDP hold
Shimane 1st	Hiroyuki Hosoda	LDP	Hiroyuki Hosoda	LDP	95,513	59.4	30,228	Akiko Kamei	CDP	40.6	LDP hold
Shimane 2nd	Wataru Takeshita	LDP	Wataru Takeshita	LDP	123,332	67.8	87,756	Muneo Fukuhara	SDP	19.6	LDP hold
Okayama 1st	Ichiro Aisawa	LDP	Ichiro Aisawa	LDP	87,272	52.7	30,515	Takashi Takai	CDP	34.3	LDP hold
Okayama 2nd	Takashi Yamashita	LDP	Takashi Yamashita	LDP	73,150	51.1	18,559	Keisuke Tsumura	KnT	38.2	LDP hold
Okayama 3rd	Takeo Hiranuma	LDP	Toshiko Abe	Ind.	59,488	38.9	3,541	Shojiro Hiranuma	Ind.	36.6	Ind. gain from LDP
Okayama 4th	Gaku Hashimoto	LDP	Gaku Hashimoto	LDP	93,172	51.9	20,892	Michiyoshi Yunoki	KnT	40.3	LDP hold
Okayama 5th	Katsunobu Katō	LDP	Katsunobu Katō	LDP	100,708	71.3	73,807	Yoshikazu Tarui	KnT	19.0	LDP hold
Hiroshima 1st	Fumio Kishida	LDP	Fumio Kishida	LDP	113,239	78.0	81,228	Osamu Onishi	JCP	22.0	LDP hold
Hiroshima 2nd	Hiroshi Hiraguchi	LDP	Hiroshi Hiraguchi	LDP	96,718	47.9	28,409	Daisuke Matsumoto	KnT	33.8	LDP hold
Hiroshima 3rd	Katsuyuki Kawai	LDP	Katsuyuki Kawai	LDP	82,998	47.4	21,022	Ayaka Shiomura	Ind.	35.4	LDP hold
Hiroshima 4th	Toshinao Nakagawa	Ind.	Masayoshi Shintani	LDP	64,911	43.6	36,349	Seiki Soramoto	Ishin	19.2	LDP gain from Ind.
Hiroshima 5th	Minoru Terada	LDP	Minoru Terada	LDP	86,193	67.1	58,281	Kotoe Hashimoto	KnT	21.7	LDP hold
Hiroshima 6th	Shizuka Kamei	Ind.	Koji Sato	KnT	85,616	50.5	16,407	Toshifumi Kojima	LDP	40.9	KnT gain from Ind.
Hiroshima 7th	Fumiaki Kobayashi	LDP	Fumiaki Kobayashi	LDP	110,547	60.5	55,649	Hironori Sato	KnT	30.0	LDP hold
Yamaguchi 1st	Masahiko Kōmura	LDP	Masahiro Kōmura	LDP	133,221	69.1	96,639	Kazuya Ouchi	KnT	19.0	LDP hold
Yamaguchi 2nd	Nobuo Kishi	LDP	Nobuo Kishi	LDP	113,012	73.8	72,961	Kazushi Matsuda	JCP	26.2	LDP hold
Yamaguchi 3rd	Takeo Kawamura	LDP	Takeo Kawamura	LDP	103,173	71.3	61,676	Fumiko Sakamoto	CDP	28.7	LDP hold
Yamaguchi 4th	Shinzo Abe	LDP	Shinzo Abe	LDP	104,825	72.6	86,258	Tokio Fujita	KnT	12.9	LDP hold

Proportional representation results
Party	Votes	Seats	Rank	Elected member	Constituency	Ratio
LDP	1,249,073 (39.2%)	5	1	Toshifumi Kojima	Hiroshima 6th	80.8%
LDP	1,249,073 (39.2%)	5	17	Mio Sugita		
LDP	1,249,073 (39.2%)	5	18	Michitaka Ikeda		
LDP	1,249,073 (39.2%)	5	19	Keiichi Furuta		
LDP	1,249,073 (39.2%)	5	20	Yasushi Miura		
CDP	533,050 (16.7%)	2	1	Akiko Kamei	Shimane 1st	68.4%
CDP	533,050 (16.7%)	2	1	Takashi Takai	Okayama 1st	65.0%
KnT	514,191 (16.1%)	2	1	Michiyoshi Yunoki	Okayama 4th	77.6%
KnT	514,191 (16.1%)	2	1	Keisuke Tsumura	Okayama 2nd	74.6%
Komei	476,270 (14.9%)	2	1	Tetsuo Saito		
Komei	476,270 (14.9%)	2	2	Keigo Masuya		

== Shikoku block ==
2017 Japanese general election in Shikoku
- 22 October 2017

All 17 seats to the House of Representatives
	Majority party	Minority party	Third party
Party	LDP	Kibō no Tō	Komeito
Last election	13 seats	3 seats	1 seat
Constituency	8	2	0
PR seats	3	1	1
Total	11	3	1
Seat change	▼2	0	0
	Fourth party	Fifth party
Party	CDP	Ind.
Last election	New	0 seats
Constituency	0	1
PR seats	1	–
Total	1	1
Seat change	▲1	▲1

Single-member constituency results in Shikoku
Constituency	Previous member		Elected member		Votes	%	Margin	Runner-up		%	Status
Tokushima 1st	Masazumi Gotoda	LDP	Masazumi Gotoda	LDP	90,281	51.5	20,839	Hirobumi Niki	KnT	39.6	LDP hold
Tokushima 2nd	Shunichi Yamaguchi	LDP	Shunichi Yamaguchi	LDP	81,616	71.0	55,890	Takayuki Kubo	JCP	22.4	LDP hold
Kagawa 1st	Takuya Hirai	LDP	Takuya Hirai	LDP	81,566	50.7	2,183	Junya Ogawa	KnT	49.3	LDP hold
Kagawa 2nd	Yuichiro Tamaki	KnT	Yuichiro Tamaki	KnT	82,345	55.5	22,396	Takakazu Seto	LDP	40.4	KnT hold
Kagawa 3rd	Keitaro Ohno	LDP	Keitaro Ohno	LDP	82,125	69.1	45,390	Shinju Fujita	SDP	30.9	LDP hold
Ehime 1st	Yasuhisa Shiozaki	LDP	Yasuhisa Shiozaki	LDP	112,930	64.8	70,330	Kiyo Tominaga	KnT	24.5	LDP hold
Ehime 2nd	Seiichiro Murakami	LDP	Seiichiro Murakami	LDP	62,516	48.8	28,622	Arata Nishioka	Ishin	26.5	LDP hold
Ehime 3rd	Vacant	LDP	Yoichi Shiraishi	KnT	70,978	53.1	17,068	Hiroki Shiraishi	LDP	40.3	KnT gain from LDP
Ehime 4th	Koichi Yamamoto	LDP	Koichi Yamamoto	LDP	80,589	54.4	23,808	Fumiki Sakurauchi	KnT	38.3	LDP hold
Kochi 1st	Gen Nakatani	LDP	Gen Nakatani	LDP	81,675	53.6	36,485	Shu Oishi	KnT	29.8	LDP hold
Kochi 2nd	Yūji Yamamoto	LDP	Hajime Hirota	Ind.	92,179	56.5	21,150	Yūji Yamamoto	LDP	43.5	Ind. gain from LDP

Proportional representation results
Party	Votes	Seats	Rank	Elected member	Constituency	Ratio
LDP	579,225 (35.9%)	3	1	Teru Fukui		
LDP	579,225 (35.9%)	3	2	Mamoru Fukuyama		
LDP	579,225 (35.9%)	3	3	Yūji Yamamoto	Kochi 2nd	77.1%
KnT	324,106 (20.1%)	1	1	Junya Ogawa	Kagawa 2nd	97.3%
Komei	236,863 (14.7%)	1	1	Noritoshi Ishida		
CDP	232,965 (14.4%)	1	1	Norio Takeuchi		

== Kyushu block ==
2017 Japanese general election in Kyushu
- 22 October 2017

All 55 seats to the House of Representatives
	Majority party	Minority party	Third party
Party	LDP	Kibō no Tō	CDP
Last election	36 seats	8 seats	New
Constituency	28	2	1
PR seats	7	4	3
Total	35	6	4
Seat change	▼1	▼2	▲4
	Fourth party	Fifth party	Sixth party
Party	Komeito	JCP	SDP
Last election	4 seats	3 seats	2 seats
Constituency	0	1	1
PR seats	3	1	1
Total	3	2	2
Seat change	▼1	▼1	0
	Seventh party	Eighth party
Party	Ishin	Ind.
Last election	New	3 seats
Constituency	0	2
PR seats	1	–
Total	1	2
Seat change	▲1	▼1

Single-member constituency results in Kyushu
Constituency	Previous member		Elected member		Votes	%	Margin	Runner-up		%	Status
Fukuoka 1st	Takahiro Inoue	LDP	Takahiro Inoue	LDP	97,777	49.2	46,714	Gōsei Yamamoto	CDP	25.7	LDP hold
Fukuoka 2nd	Makoto Oniki	LDP	Makoto Oniki	LDP	109,098	47.9	8,160	Shuji Inatomi	KnT	44.3	LDP hold
Fukuoka 3rd	Atsushi Koga	LDP	Atsushi Koga	LDP	136,499	59.0	41,727	Koichi Yamauchi	CDP	41.0	LDP hold
Fukuoka 4th	Hideki Miyauchi	LDP	Hideki Miyauchi	LDP	104,726	55.6	53,300	Masami Kawano	Ishin	27.3	LDP hold
Fukuoka 5th	Yoshiaki Harada	LDP	Yoshiaki Harada	LDP	123,758	50.5	27,083	Daizo Kusuda	KnT	39.4	LDP hold
Fukuoka 6th	Jiro Hatoyama	LDP	Jiro Hatoyama	LDP	131,244	66.3	88,069	Fumiko Arai	Ind.	21.8	LDP hold
Fukuoka 7th	Satoshi Fujimaru	LDP	Satoshi Fujimaru	LDP	91,477	57.3	43,287	Keisuke Hara	KnT	30.2	LDP hold
Fukuoka 8th	Tarō Asō	LDP	Tarō Asō	LDP	135,334	72.2	83,307	Tsuyako Miyajima	JCP	27.8	LDP hold
Fukuoka 9th	Asahiko Mihara	LDP	Asahiko Mihara	LDP	91,329	45.7	12,496	Rintaro Ogata	KnT	39.5	LDP hold
Fukuoka 10th	Kozo Yamamoto	LDP	Kozo Yamamoto	LDP	87,674	44.2	7,601	Takashi Kii	KnT	40.3	LDP hold
Fukuoka 11th	Ryota Takeda	LDP	Ryota Takeda	LDP	81,129	55.5	38,794	Tomonobu Murakami	KnT	28.9	LDP hold
Saga 1st	Kazuhiro Haraguchi	Ind.	Kazuhiro Haraguchi	Ind.	105,487	55.7	26,515	Kazuchika Iwata	LDP	41.7	Ind. hold
Saga 2nd	Yasushi Furukawa	LDP	Hiroshi Ogushi	KnT	105,921	49.7	6,818	Yasushi Furukawa	LDP	46.5	KnT gain from LDP
Nagasaki 1st	Tsutomu Tomioka	LDP	Hideko Nishioka	KnT	90,569	48.3	10,520	Tsutomu Tomioka	LDP	42.9	KnT gain from LDP
Nagasaki 2nd	Kanji Kato	LDP	Kanji Kato	LDP	97,874	57.3	40,336	Hatsumi Yamaguchi	KnT	33.7	LDP hold
Nagasaki 3rd	Yaichi Tanigawa	LDP	Yaichi Tanigawa	LDP	83,992	59.7	48,438	Seiichi Suetsugu	KnT	25.3	LDP hold
Nagasaki 4th	Seigo Kitamura	LDP	Seigo Kitamura	LDP	73,899	50.8	12,762	Daisuke Miyajima	KnT	42.0	LDP hold
Kumamoto 1st	Minoru Kihara	LDP	Minoru Kihara	LDP	123,431	56.2	27,057	Yorihisa Matsuno	KnT	43.8	LDP hold
Kumamoto 2nd	Takeshi Noda	LDP	Takeshi Noda	LDP	86,027	47.5	23,452	Daisuke Nishino	Ind.	34.5	LDP hold
Kumamoto 3rd	Tetsushi Sakamoto	LDP	Tetsushi Sakamoto	LDP	129,312	73.6	82,920	Shizuka Sekine	JCP	26.4	LDP hold
Kumamoto 4th	Hiroyuki Sonoda	LDP	Yasushi Kaneko	LDP	150,453	62.8	61,174	Masayoshi Yagami	CDP	37.2	LDP hold
Kumamoto 5th	Yasushi Kaneko	LDP	Seat abolished								LDP loss
Oita 1st	Shuji Kira	KnT	Yoichi Anami	LDP	90,422	46.4	3,030	Shuji Kira	KnT	44.8	LDP gain from KnT
Oita 2nd	Seishirō Etō	LDP	Seishirō Etō	LDP	89,944	53.3	19,086	Hajime Yoshikawa	SDP	42.0	LDP hold
Oita 3rd	Takeshi Iwaya	LDP	Takeshi Iwaya	LDP	99,412	54.2	15,279	Katsuhiko Yokomitsu	CDP	45.8	LDP hold
Miyazaki 1st	Shunsuke Takei	LDP	Shunsuke Takei	LDP	94,780	55.2	37,733	Itsuki Toyama	KnT	33.2	LDP hold
Miyazaki 2nd	Taku Etō	LDP	Taku Etō	LDP	98,170	69.7	68,339	Manji Kuroki	JCP	21.2	LDP hold
Miyazaki 3rd	Yoshihisa Furukawa	LDP	Yoshihisa Furukawa	LDP	98,008	69.4	69,722	Tomofumi Hanawa	KnT	30.0	LDP hold
Kagoshima 1st	Okiharu Yasuoka	LDP	Hiroshi Kawauchi	CDP	76,699	41.8	1,868	Hirotake Yasuoka	LDP	40.8	LDP hold
Kagoshima 2nd	Masuo Kaneko	LDP	Masuo Kaneko	LDP	97,743	51.3	54,412	Kayo Saito	KnT	22.7	LDP hold
Kagoshima 3rd	Takeshi Noma	KnT	Yasuhiro Ozato	LDP	102,501	50.4	12,261	Takeshi Noma	KnT	44.4	LDP gain from KnT
Kagoshima 4th	Yasuhiro Ozato	LDP	Hiroshi Moriyama	LDP	128,112	70.8	75,221	Noro Masakazu	SDP	29.2	LDP hold
Kagoshima 5th	Hiroshi Moriyama	LDP	Seat abolished								LDP loss
Okinawa 1st	Seiken Akamine	JCP	Seiken Akamine	JCP	60,605	39.9	6,137	Konosuke Kokuba	LDP	35.9	JCP hold
Okinawa 2nd	Kantoku Teruya	SDP	Kantoku Teruya	SDP	92,143	58.9	27,950	Masahisa Miyazaki	LDP	41.1	SDP hold
Okinawa 3rd	Denny Tamaki	Ind.	Denny Tamaki	Ind.	95,517	57.9	28,990	Natsumi Higa	LDP	40.3	Ind. hold
Okinawa 4th	Toshinobu Nakasato	Ind.	Kosaburo Nishime	LDP	82,199	50.5	6,312	Toshinobu Nakasato	Ind.	46.6	LDP gain from Ind.

Proportional representation results
Party	Votes	Seats	Rank	Elected member	Constituency	Ratio
LDP	2,171,754 (33.8%)	7	1	Hiroyuki Sonoda		
LDP	2,171,754 (33.8%)	7	2	Takuma Miyaji		
LDP	2,171,754 (33.8%)	7	3	Masahiro Imamura		
LDP	2,171,754 (33.8%)	7	4	Yasushi Furukawa	Saga 2nd	93.6%
LDP	2,171,754 (33.8%)	7	4	Konosuke Kokuba	Okinawa 1st	89.9%
LDP	2,171,754 (33.8%)	7	4	Tsutomu Tomioka	Nagasaki 1st	88.4%
LDP	2,171,754 (33.8%)	7	4	Kazuchika Iwata	Saga 1st	74.9%
KnT	1,168,708 (18.1%)	4	1	Nariaki Nakayama		
KnT	1,168,708 (18.1%)	4	2	Shuji Kira	Oita 1st	96.6%
KnT	1,168,708 (18.1%)	4	2	Shuji Inatomi	Fukuoka 2nd	92.5%
KnT	1,168,708 (18.1%)	4	2	Takashi Kii	Fukuoka 10th	91.3%
CDP	1,054,589 (16.3%)	3	1	Katsuhiko Yokomitsu	Oita 3rd	84.6%
CDP	1,054,589 (16.3%)	3	1	Koichi Yamauchi	Fukuoka 3rd	69.4%
CDP	1,054,589 (16.3%)	3	1	Masayoshi Yagami	Kumamoto 4th	59.3%
Komei	1,021,227 (15.8%)	3	1	Yasuyuki Eda		
Komei	1,021,227 (15.8%)	3	2	Kiyohiko Toyama		
Komei	1,021,227 (15.8%)	3	3	Masakazu Hamachi		
JCP	421,962 (6.5%)	1	2	Takaaki Tamura		
SDP	277,704 (4.3%)	1	1	Hajime Yoshikawa	Oita 2nd	78.8%
Ishin	277,203 (4.3%)	1	1	Mikio Shimoji	Okinawa 1st	56.5%

== Leaders' races ==
Results for party leaders
Party	Member	Constituency	Votes	%	Position	Status
LDP	Shinzo Abe	Yamaguchi 4th	104,825	72.6	1st	Re-elected
CDP	Yukio Edano	Saitama 5th	119,091	57.4	1st	Re-elected
KnT	Yuriko Koike	Governor of Tokyo				
Komei	Natsuo Yamaguchi	House of Councillors				
JCP	Kazuo Shii	Southern Kanto PR	550,404	8.0	1st	Re-elected
Ishin	Ichirō Matsui	Governor of Osaka				
SDP	Tadatomo Yoshida	No elected office				

== Closest races ==
Candidates with a narrow loss ratio of over 90%
Constituency	Candidate		Votes	%	Ratio
Niigata 3rd	Hiroaki Saito	LDP	95,594	49.1	99.9
Hokkaido 10th	Hiroshi Kamiya	CDP	96,282	49.9	99.5
Saitama 12th	Toshikazu Morita	KnT	86,007	44.7	99.4
Shizuoka 6th	Takaaki Katsumata	LDP	108,157	45.8	99.4
Yamanashi 1st	Shinichi Nakatani	LDP	105,876	43.9	98.9
Tokyo 18th	Masatada Tsuchiya	LDP	95,667	40.3	98.9
Miyagi 2nd	Sayuri Kamata	Ind.	110,243	49.7	98.8
Chiba 1st	Kaname Tajima	KnT	81,481	40.0	98.4
Kyoto 6th	Kazunori Yamanoi	KnT	100,338	42.3	98.4
Aichi 8th	Yutaka Banno	Ind.	106,625	45.4	98.3
Fukushima 4th	Shinji Oguma	KnT	67,073	43.9	98.2
Osaka 1st	Inoue Hidetaka	Ishin	66,506	36.9	98.2
Tokyo 6th	Takao Ochi	LDP	98,422	40.0	98.0
Tokyo 5th	Yoshio Tezuka	CDP	99,182	40.3	97.9
Osaka 14th	Takashi Tanihata	Ishin	77,696	40.2	97.9
Akita 2nd	Takashi Midorikawa	KnT	73,163	45.3	97.8
Osaka 9th	Yasushi Adachi	Ishin	91,438	39.8	97.8
Niigata 6th	Mamoru Umetani	Ind.	92,080	49.4	97.7
Kanagawa 9th	Norihiro Nakayama	LDP	70,819	40.3	97.6
Kagoshima 1st	Hirotake Yasuoka	LDP	74,831	40.8	97.6
Ishikawa 3rd	Kazuya Kondo	KnT	78,306	47.8	97.4
Nara 1st	Sumio Mabuchi	KnT	88,082	39.7	97.3
Kagawa 1st	Junya Ogawa	KnT	79,383	49.3	97.3
Kanagawa 12th	Tsuyoshi Hoshino	LDP	83,924	41.9	97.0
Tokyo 1st	Miki Yamada	LDP	93,234	39.4	96.9
Oita 1st	Shuji Kira	KnT	87,392	44.8	96.6
Kanagawa 6th	Isamu Ueda	Komei	82,788	42.8	95.9
Yamanashi 2nd	Kotaro Nagasaki	Ind.	67,434	38.4	95.6
Tokyo 21st	Kiyoshi Odawara	LDP	88,225	39.1	95.5
Hokkaido 5th	Maki Ikeda	CDP	135,948	47.5	95.3
Ibaraki 6th	Yamato Aoyama	KnT	96,987	43.3	94.3
Tokyo 19th	Yoshinori Suematsu	CDP	90,540	38.7	94.1
Aichi 13th	Sei Oomi	LDP	109,581	44.6	94.1
Okayama 3rd	Shojiro Hiranuma	Ind.	55,947	36.6	94.0
Shiga 1st	Yukiko Kada	Ind.	79,724	44.7	93.8
Saga 2nd	Yasushi Furukawa	LDP	99,103	46.5	93.6
Fukuoka 2nd	Shuji Inatomi	KnT	100,938	44.3	92.5
Okinawa 4th	Toshinobu Nakasato	Ind.	75,887	46.6	92.3
Osaka 18th	Noboru Kamitani	LDP	80,198	40.8	92.1
Ibaraki 5th	Satoshi Asano	KnT	56,098	44.0	91.3
Fukuoka 10th	Takashi Kii	KnT	80,073	40.3	91.3
Osaka 11th	Yukari Sato	LDP	69,366	33.5	91.1
Osaka 15th	Yasuto Urano	Ishin	74,368	39.8	90.7
Osaka 4th	Teruo Minobe	Ishin	72,446	38.3	90.5
Osaka 12th	Fumitake Fujita	Ishin	64,530	40.6	90.1
