= Kentarō Uesugi =

Japanese politician

- 上杉 謙太郎
- Official portrait, 2026

Member of the House of Representatives
- Incumbent
- Assumed office 9 February 2026
- Preceded by: Shinji Oguma
- Constituency: Fukushima 3rd
- In office 23 October 2017 – 9 October 2024
- Preceded by: Multi-member district
- Succeeded by: Multi-member district
- Constituency: Tohoku PR

Personal details
- Born: 20 April 1975 (age 51) Chigasaki, Kanagawa Prefecture, Japan
- Party: Liberal Democratic
- Other political affiliations: NRP (until 2013)
- Education: Waseda University
- Website: Kentarō Uesugi website

Kentarō Uesugi (上杉 謙太郎, Uesugi Kentarō; born 20 April 1975) is a Japanese politician of the Liberal Democratic Party, who serves as a member of the House of Representatives.

== Early years ==
In 1975, Uesugi was born in Chigasaki, Kanagawa Prefecture. After graduating from the Waseda University's School of Social Sciences, he entered Hiroyuki Arai's Office and served a secretary to him from 2005 until 2010.

== Political career ==
In the 2012 general election, Uesugi ran in Tohoku PR as a NRP candidate but could not win a seat.

In 2013, he became a tech company executive and supported Masako Mori as a social media staff in the 2013 House of Councillors election.

In the 2014 general election, Uesugi ran in Fukushima 3rd district as a LDP candidate but lost to incumbent Kōichirō Genba.

In the 2017 general election, Uesugi lost to Genba but won a seat in the PR.

In October 2021, Uesugi was appointed to Parliamentary Vice-Minister for Foreign Affairs in the First Kishida cabinet.

In the 2021 general election, Uesugi lost to CDP’s Genba but won a seat in the PR again. After the election, he was re-appointed to Parliamentary Vice-Minister for Foreign Affairs in the Second Kishida cabinet.

Due to the redistricting that reduced Fukushima Prefecture's seats from five to four, Ichirō Kanke was appointed as the head of the LDP new Fukushima 3rd district branch (effectively the designated candidate) on 14 March 2023. Uesugi would run in the PR in the next general election.

On 6 October 2024, the new LDP President Shigeru Ishiba announced a policy regarding the upcoming general election: members involved in the slush fund scandal who failed to report political funds in their income and expenditure reports will not be allowed to run on the PR block's party list, even if they are nominated as candidates for their respective single-seat constituencies. The treatment of Uesugi, who had been scheduled to run solely for the proportional representation block, became a point of contention. On October 11, he announced his withdrawal from the race, stating, "I have decided to withdraw to show that I am taking clear responsibility. I will start over from scratch." However, after Kanke, who was set to run in the Fukushima 3rd district, abruptly announced that he would not seek election, Uesugi reversed his decision two days later. On October 13, he declared his candidacy for the Fukushima 3rd district. He ran as an independent, as he was unable to secure LDP's nomination. In the 2024 general election, he lost to CDP's Shinji Oguma and lost re-election.

In the 2026 general election, Uesugi defeated CRA's Oguma and gained the Fukushima 3rd seat.

== Scandal ==
=== Slush fund scandal ===
On 1 December 2023, the Asahi Shimbun reported that Seiwa Seisaku Kenkyūkai, known as Abe faction, is suspected of continuing to systematically kick back to lawmakers with the income collected by its members beyond the sales quota.

It was revealed that Uesugi used a total of 3.09 million yen as slush funds for five years from 2018 to 2022 as a kickback from the faction for quota excess.

On 4 April 2024, LDP held the Party Ethics Committee meeting and decided to issue a reprimand to Uesugi from the Secretary-General.

On 14 May 2024, the House of Representatives Political Ethics Committee unanimously passed the opposition's petition to attend and explain 44 LDP members who were involved in the slush fund scandal but did not explain themselves to the committee. On 17 May 2024, the House of Councillors Political Ethics Committee unanimously passed a petition for attendance and explanation to 29 members who had not made excuses. All 73 Diet members, including Uesugi, refused to attend, and the ordinary Diet session was closed on 23 June 2024.
