= Fukushima 3rd district =

Japan House of Representatives constituency

- Parliamentary constituency for the Japanese House of Representatives
- Numbered map of Fukushima Prefecture single-member districts
- Prefecture: Fukushima
- Proportional District: Tōhoku
- Electorate: 324,732 (Sept. 2024)

Current constituency
- Created: 1994 (Redistricted in 2022)
- Seats: One
- Party: LDP
- Representative: Kentarō Uesugi

Fukushima 3rd district (福島[県第]3区, Fukushima[-ken dai-]san-ku) is a single-member constituency of the House of Representatives in the Diet of Japan, located in Western Fukushima Prefecture. The electoral district lies mostly in the Aizu region and consists of the cities of Aizuwakamatsu, Shirakawa and Kitakata and six districts: Minamiaizu, Higashishirakawa, Yama, Kawanuma, Ōnuma and Nishishirakawa. As of 2012, 293,378 eligible voters were registered in the district.

Before the electoral reform of 1994, the area had been part of the multi-member Fukushima 2nd district that elected five Representatives by single non-transferable vote.

After the district's creation, then Liberal Democrat Hiroyuki Arai (later New Party Nippon, New Renaissance Party) narrowly beat Democrat Kōichirō Genba who won a seat in the Tōhoku proportional representation block. Both had been elected to the House in the pre-reform 2nd district in 1993 for the first time. Since the LDP was using the Costa Rica method (kosuta rika hōshiki) in Fukushima 3rd district, Arai only ran in the PR block in the 2000 general election and was replaced by Yoshiyuki Hozumi as district candidate, another of the three former LDP representatives from the pre-reform 2nd district (The third, Fumiaki Saitō, stood as LDP candidate in Fukushima 4th district in 1996, but lost). But Genba won the 3rd district in 2000 and has held onto the district seat since. After Arai's unsuccessful re-run in 2003, the LDP discontinued the Costa Rica alternation. Genba was appointed minister of state and Democratic Party policy affairs chief under party president/prime minister Naoto Kan in 2010.

== List of representatives ==
Election	Representative	Party	Notes
1996	Hiroyuki Arai	Liberal Democratic	
2000	Kōichirō Genba	Democratic	
2003	Kōichirō Genba	Democratic	
2005	Kōichirō Genba	Democratic	
2009	Kōichirō Genba	Democratic	
2012	Kōichirō Genba	Democratic	
2014	Kōichirō Genba	Democratic	
2017	Kōichirō Genba	Independent	
2021	Kōichirō Genba	Constitutional Democratic	Transferred to the 2nd District
2024	Shinji Oguma	Constitutional Democratic	Transferred from the 4th District
2026	Kentarō Uesugi	LDP	

== Election results ==
2026
Party	Candidate	Votes	%	±%
LDP	Kentarō Uesugi	107,649	57	▲18.4
Centrist Reform	Shinji Oguma	77,011	40.8	▼14
Independent	Jinshan Tun	4,084	2.2	
Registered electors		323,682		
Turnout		188,744	61.03	▲4.32
LDP gain from Centrist Reform				

2024
Party	Candidate	Votes	%	±%
CDP	Shinji Oguma	96,814	54.8	▲0.6
Independent	Kentarō Uesugi	68,133	38.6	▼7.2
JCP	Norio Karahashi	11,715	6.6	
Registered electors		323,682		
Turnout			56.71	▼7.31
CDP hold				

2021
Party	Candidate	Votes	%	±%
CDP	Kōichirō Genba	90,457	54.2	▼4.4
LDP	Kentarō Uesugi (elected by PR)	76,302	45.8	▲9.2
Turnout			64.05	▲3.09
CDP hold				

2017
Party	Candidate	Votes	%	±%
Independent	Kōichirō Genba	92,930	56.6	▼3.4
LDP	Kentarō Uesugi (elected by PR)	60,006	36.6	▲5.4
JCP	Kenji Hashimoto	11,196	6.8	▼2.0
Turnout			60.96	▲5.18
Independent hold				

2014
Party	Candidate	Votes	%	±%
Democratic	Kōichirō Genba	94,462	60.0	▼2.3
LDP	Kentarō Uesugi	49,174	31.2	▲3.0
JCP	Yōko Yokota	13,824	8.8	▼0.6
Turnout			55.78	▼5.91
Democratic hold				

2012
Party	Candidate	Votes	%	±%
Democratic (People's New)	Kōichirō Genba	107,737	62.3	▼11.5
LDP (New Renaissance)	Sachiko Kanno (elected by PR)	48,796	28.2	▲2
JCP	Toshie Oyamada	16,313	9.4	new
Registered electors		292,166		
Turnout			61.69	Steady
Democratic hold				

2009
Party	Candidate	Votes	%	±%
Democratic (People's New)	Kōichirō Genba	159,826	73.8	▲5.2
LDP (Kōmeitō)	Masayoshi Yoshino (elected by PR)	56,858	26.2	▼5.2
Turnout		221,345	74.26	
Democratic hold				

2005
Party	Candidate	Votes	%	±%
Democratic	Kōichirō Genba	143,850	68.6	▲16.6
LDP (Komeito)	Susumu Hasumi	65,996	31.4	▼13
Turnout		216,252	72.29	
Democratic hold				

2003
Party	Candidate	Votes	%	±%
Democratic	Kōichirō Genba	110,606	52.0	▼1.8
LDP (Komeito)	Hiroyuki Arai	94,413	44.4	▲3
JCP	Shōichi Suzuki	7,522	3.5	▼1.4
Turnout		215,981	72.54	
Democratic hold				

2000
Party	Candidate	Votes	%	±%
Democratic	Kōichirō Genba	118,385	53.8	▲9.4
LDP	Yoshiyuki Hozumi	91,081	41.4	▼4.8
JCP	Shōichi Suzuki	10,683	4.9	▼0.7
Democratic gain from LDP				

1996
Party	Candidate	Votes	%	±%
LDP	Hiroyuki Arai	91,747	46.2	
Democratic	Kōichirō Genba (elected by PR)	88,214	44.4	
JCP	Shōichi Suzuki	11,031	5.6	
Independent	Naoyuki Suzuki	7,688	3.9	
Turnout		204,082	70.89	
LDP win (new seat)				
