= Ichirō Kanke =

Japanese politician

- 菅家 一郎
- Official portrait, 2019

Member of the House of Representatives
- Incumbent
- Assumed office 9 February 2026
- Preceded by: Multi-member district
- Constituency: Tohoku PR
- In office 17 December 2012 – 9 October 2024
- Preceded by: Kōzō Watanabe
- Succeeded by: Multi-member district
- Constituency: Fukushima 4th (2012–2014); Tohoku PR (2014–2017); Fukushima 4th (2017–2021); Tohoku PR (2021–2024)

Mayor of Aizuwakamatsu
- In office April 1999 – 2011
- Preceded by: Hideo Yamauchi
- Succeeded by: Shohei Muroi

Member of the Fukushima Prefectural Assembly
- In office 1995–1999
- Constituency: Aizuwakamatsu

Member of the Aizuwakamatsu City Council
- In office 1991–1995

Personal details
- Born: 20 May 1955 (age 71) Aizuwakamatsu, Fukushima, Japan
- Party: Liberal Democratic
- Education: Waseda University
- Website: Ichirō Kanke website

Ichirō Kanke (菅家 一郎, Kanke Ichirō; born 20 May 1955) is a Japanese politician of the Liberal Democratic Party, who serves as a member of the House of Representatives.

== Early years ==
In 1955, Kanke was born in Aizuwakamatsu, Fukushima Prefecture. He graduated from the Waseda University's School of Social Sciences.

== Political career ==
In 1991, Kanke ran for the Aizuwakamatsu City Council and won. After he served the office for 4 years, he ran for the Fukushima Prefectural Assembly and was elected for the first time.

In 1999, Kanke ran for the mayor of Aizuwakamatsu. He was elected to the mayor and he served until 2011.

In the 2012 general election, Kanke ran in Fukushima 4th district that includes Aizuwakamatsu and gained the seat.

In the 2014 general election, Kanke lost to Innovation’s Shinji Oguma by 416 votes but won a seat in the PR.

In the 2017 general election, Kanke defeated Kibō’s Oguma by 1,209 votes and regained Fukushima 4th's seat.

In October 2018, Kanke was appointed to Parliamentary Vice-Minister for the Environment, and Parliamentary Vice-Minister of Cabinet Office in the Fourth Abe first reshuffled cabinet.

In September 2019, Kanke was appointed to State Minister for Reconstruction in the Fourth Abe second reshuffled cabinet.

In the 2021 general election, Kanke lost to CDP’s Oguma by 2,899 votes but won a seat in the PR.

Due to the redistricting that reduced Fukushima Prefecture's seats from five to four, Kanke was appointed as the head of the new Fukushima 3rd district (effectively the designated candidate) on 14 March 2023.

In the 2024 LDP presidential election, although Kanke was a former member of the Abe faction, he voted for Shigeru Ishiba both in first round and run-off vote.

In the 2024 general election, on October 6, 2024, PM Ishiba decided not to nominate members who were suspended from their membership in the general election, including Kanke, because of the involvement in the slush fund scandal. After the decision, Kanke announced he would not run in the election.

In the 2026 general election, Kanke ran as a candidate for Tohoku PR and won the seat.

== Scandal ==
=== Allegations of Public Offices Election Act Violations ===
In February 2019, it was revealed that Kanke's Office had distributed printed materials free of charge to voters in Aizuwakamatsu City, located within his constituency. These materials featured calendars and photographs from when he assumed the dual roles of Parliamentary Vice-Minister of the Environment and Parliamentary Vice-Minister of the Cabinet Office. In response to allegations that this activity violated the Public Offices Election Act, which strictly prohibits the act of making donations to voters, Kanke's office commented: "These were intended as indoor posters and do not constitute a donation."

=== Slush fund scandal ===
On 1 December 2023, the Asahi Shimbun reported that Seiwa Seisaku Kenkyūkai, known as Abe faction, is suspected of continuing to systematically kick back to lawmakers with the income collected by its members beyond the sales quota.

It was revealed that Kanke used a total of 12.89 million yen as slush funds for five years from 2018 to 2022 as a kickback from the faction for quota excess.

On 4 April 2024, LDP held the Party Ethics Committee meeting and decided to suspend Kanke from office for half a year.

On 14 May 2024, the House of Representatives Political Ethics Committee unanimously passed the opposition's petition to attend and explain 44 LDP members who were involved in the slush fund scandal but did not explain themselves to the committee. On 17 May 2024, the House of Councillors Political Ethics Committee unanimously passed a petition for attendance and explanation to 29 members who had not made excuses. All 73 Diet members, including Kanke, refused to attend, and the ordinary Diet session was closed on 23 June 2024.
