= Hiroyuki Arai =

Japanese politician

- 荒井 広幸
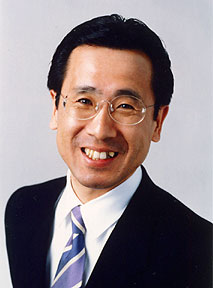
- Official portrait, 2000

Member of the House of Councillors
- In office 26 July 2004 – 25 July 2016
- Constituency: National PR

Member of the House of Representatives
- In office 19 July 1993 – 10 October 2003
- Constituency: Fukushima 2nd (1993–1996); Fukushima 3rd (1996–2000); Tohoku PR (2000–2003)

Member of the Fukushima Prefectural Assembly
- In office 1987–1990

Personal details
- Born: 15 May 1958 (age 68) Tamura, Fukushima, Japan
- Party: Liberal Democratic (1987–2005; 2017–present)
- Other political affiliations: NPN (2005–2007); Independent (2007–2008); JRP (2008–2010); NRP (2010–2017)
- Education: Waseda University

Hiroyuki Arai (荒井 広幸, Arai Hiroyuki; born 1958) is a former Japanese politician, who served as a member of the House of Representatives and the House of Councillors in the Diet (national legislature). A native of Tamura, Fukushima and graduate of Waseda University, he had served in the Fukushima Prefectural Assembly for one term starting in 1987. He was elected to House of Representatives for the first time in 1993 after running unsuccessfully in 1990. After losing the seat in 2003, he was elected to the House of Councillors for the first time in 2004 as a member of the Liberal Democratic Party.

House of Councillors
Preceded by N/A	Councillor by proportional representation 2004–2016	Succeeded by N/A
House of Representatives (Japan)
Preceded by N/A	Representative for the Tōhoku proportional representation block 2000–2003	Succeeded by N/A
New constituency	Representative for Fukushima 3rd district 1996–2000	Succeeded by Kōichirō Genba
Preceded by Masayoshi Itō; Kōzō Watanabe; Yoshiyuki Hozumi; Kazuo Shiga; Yukio Watanabe	Representative for Fukushima 2nd district (multi-member); 1993–1996; Served alongside: Kōzō Watanabe, Fumiaki Saitō, Kōichirō Genba, Yoshiyuki Hozumi	District eliminated
Party political offices
New political party	New Renaissance Party secretary general 2010–2017	Party dissolved
New political party	Japan Renaissance Party secretary general 2008–2010	Merged into New Renaissance Party
New political party	New Party Nippon secretary general 2005–2007	Vacant
