= Yuki Baba =

Japanese politician (born 1992)

- 馬場 雄基
- Baba in 2025

Mayor of Fukushima
- Incumbent
- Assumed office 8 December 2025
- Preceded by: Hiroshi Kohata

Member of the House of Representatives
- In office 5 November 2021 – 8 September 2025
- Preceded by: Multi-member district
- Succeeded by: Masahiro Harada
- Constituency: Tohoku PR

Personal details
- Born: 15 October 1992 (age 33) Kōriyama, Fukushima, Japan
- Party: Constitutional Democratic
- Education: Keio University

Yuki Baba (born 15 October 1992) is a Japanese politician from the Constitutional Democratic Party who was a member of the House of Representatives from 2021 until 2025. He represented the Second District of Fukushima prefecture as part of the Tohoku proportional representation block.

He was the first member of the National Diet who was born in the Heisei era along with Shin Tsuchida.

On 16 November 2025, he was elected as the mayor of Fukushima with 55.6% of the vote, defeating two-term incumbent mayor Hiroshi Kohata.
