= Kōichirō Genba =

Japanese politician (born 1964)

- 玄葉 光一郎
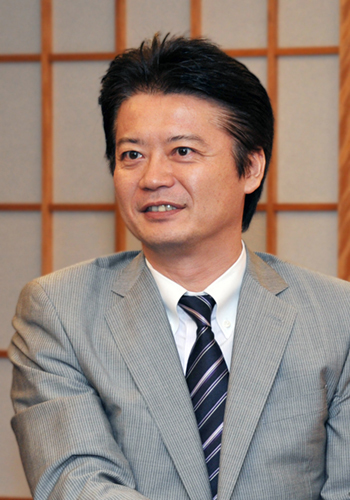
- Genba in 2012

Vice Speaker of the House of Representatives
- In office 11 November 2024 – 23 January 2026
- Speaker: Fukushiro Nukaga
- Preceded by: Banri Kaieda
- Succeeded by: Keiichi Ishii

Minister for Foreign Affairs
- In office 2 September 2011 – 26 December 2012
- Prime Minister: Yoshihiko Noda
- Preceded by: Takeaki Matsumoto
- Succeeded by: Fumio Kishida

Member of the House of Representatives
- In office 18 July 1993 – 23 January 2026
- Preceded by: Multi-member district
- Succeeded by: Taku Nemoto
- Constituency: Former Fukushima 2nd (1993–1996); Tohoku PR (1996–2000); Fukushima 3rd (2000–2024); Fukushima 2nd (2024–2026)

Member of the Fukushima Prefectural Assembly
- In office 1991–1993

Personal details
- Born: 20 May 1964 (age 62) Tamura, Fukushima, Japan
- Party: CRA (since 2026)
- Other political affiliations: LDP (1991–1993); NPS (1993–1996); DP 1996 (1996–1998); DPJ (1998–2016); DP 2016 (2016–2018); Group of Independents (2018–2019); Social Security (2019–2020); CDP (2020–2026)
- Education: Sophia University (LL.B.)
- Website: Official website

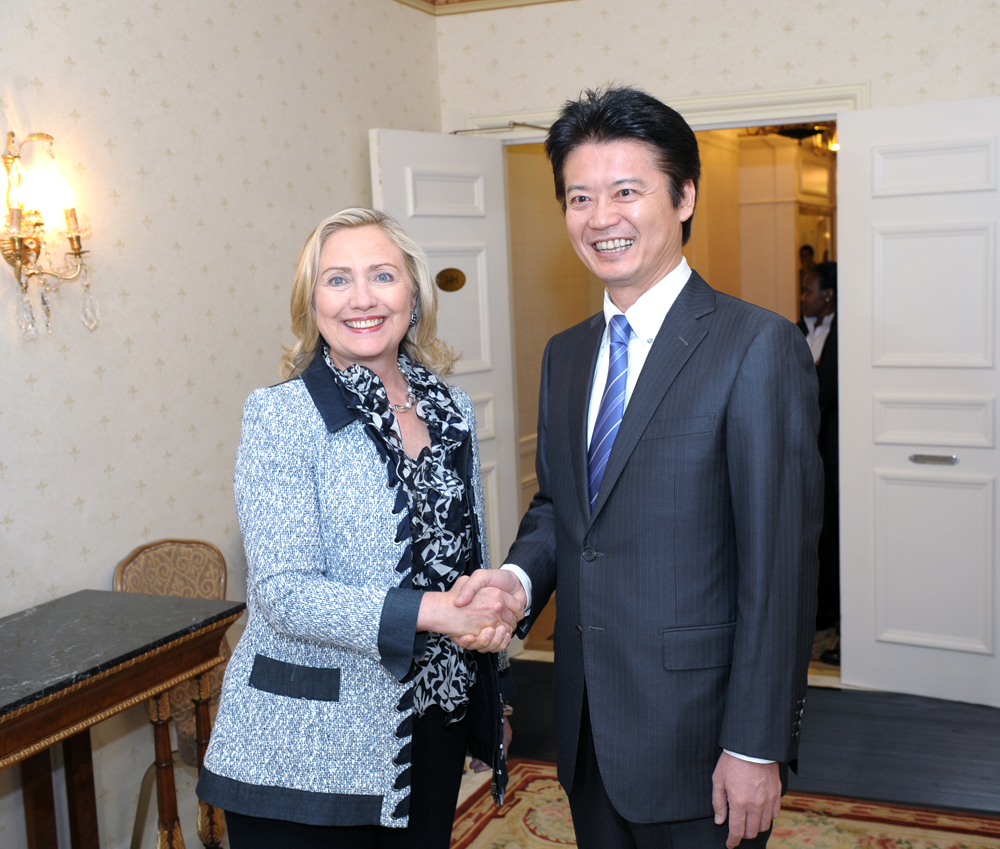
Clinton and Gemba

Kōichirō Genba (玄葉 光一郎, Genba Kōichirō; born 20 May 1964) is a Japanese politician who served as Minister for Foreign Affairs from 2011 to 2012. He is a member of the House of Representatives in the Diet, and was a member to the Democratic Party of Japan and its successor Democratic Party until its merger in 2018. He left the party briefly before the merger, and joined the Group of Independents House of Representatives caucus of other former Democrats a few days later. A native of Tamura, Fukushima and graduate of Sophia University, he was later accepted into the prestigious Matsushita Institute of Government and Management, an institution founded by Panasonic founder Konosuke Matsushita which grooms future civic leaders of Japan. Genba was elected to the House of Representatives for the first time in 1993 after serving in the assembly of Fukushima Prefecture for one term. In September 2011 he was chosen as Minister for Foreign Affairs in the cabinet of Prime Minister Yoshihiko Noda.

Genba was part of Kenta Izumi's shadow cabinet 'Next Cabinet' as the shadow Minister for Foreign Affairs.

House of Representatives (Japan)
Preceded by Masayoshi Ito; Kozo Watanabe; Yoshiyuki Hozumi	Member of the House of Representatives for Fukushima 2nd district 1993–1996; Served alongside: Kozo Watanabe, Fumiaki Saitō, Yoshiyuki Hozumi, Hiroyuki Arai	Constituency abolished
New constituency	Member of the House of Representatives for Tōhoku; 1996–2000; Served alongside: 15 others	Succeeded by (14-member constituency)
Preceded by Hiroyuki Arai	Member of the House of Representatives for Fukushima 3rd district 2000–present	Incumbent
Preceded by Kazunori Tanaka	Chairman of the Committee on Financial Affairs; 2009–2010	Succeeded by Banri Kaieda
Preceded by Kenko Matsuki	Chairman of the Committee on Audit and Oversight of Administration; 2016–2017	Succeeded by Satoshi Arai
Preceded by Banri Kaieda	Vice Speaker of the House of Representatives; 2024–2026	Succeeded by Keiichi Ishii
Political offices
Preceded by Yoshito Sengoku	Minister of State for Civil Service Reform; 2010	Succeeded by Renhō Murata
New office	Minister of State for the New Public Commons; 2010–2011	Succeeded by Renhō Murata
Preceded by Satoshi Arai	Minister of State for National Policy; 2010–2011	Succeeded by Motohisa Furukawa
Preceded by Banri Kaieda	Minister of State for Science and Technology Policy; 2011	Succeeded by Motohisa Furukawa
Preceded by Banri Kaieda	Minister of State for Space Policy; 2011	Succeeded by Motohisa Furukawa
Preceded by Takeaki Matsumoto	Minister for Foreign Affairs; 2011–2012	Succeeded by Fumio Kishida
Party political offices
Preceded by Masayuki Naoshima	Policy Research Council Chairman of the Democratic Party; 2010–2011	Succeeded by Seiji Maehara
