= New Party Nippon =

New Party Nippon 新党日本 Shintō Nippon
- Founder: Yasuo Tanaka
- Founded: August 21, 2005
- Dissolved: January 31, 2015
- Ideology: Liberalism; Social liberalism
- Political position: Centre
- Colours: Red

Website
- www.nippon-dream.com

The New Party Nippon (新党日本 Shintō Nippon) was a Japanese political party formed on August 21, 2005. The party was headed by the former Nagano governor Yasuo Tanaka, and includes Diet members Kōki Kobayashi (deputy leader), Takashi Aoyama, Makoto Taki, and Hiroyuki Arai, who left the Liberal Democratic Party in opposition to Prime Minister Junichiro Koizumi’s postal privatization drive.

The new party was seen as aiming to appeal toward urban voters, while the People's New Party, formed around the same time by other LDP rebels, had a more rural support base.

In the 2005 Japan general election, only one member, Makoto Taki, was elected (to a proportional seat in Kinki), with Kobayashi and Aoyama, among others, failing to be elected in either single-seat or proportional districts.

In July 2007, Hiroyuki Arai and Minoru Taki left the party.

In the 2007 Japanese House of Councillors election, Yasuo Tanaka, the President, was elected.

In 2012 Japanese general election the party lost its final representative in the Diet.

== Motions against Yoshihiko Noda ==
On August 3, 2012 the party (which had no member in the lower house) in concert with six other minor opposition parties (People's Life First, Kizuna Party, Social Democratic Party, Your Party, Japanese Communist Party and the New Renaissance Party) agreed to submit a no confidence motion against Prime Minister Yoshihiko Noda in an effort to block the passage of the bill raising Japan's consumption tax from 5% to 10%. In the Japanese diet the support of 51 lawmakers is required to submit a co-confidence motion to the lower house. The motion was submitted to the lower house on August 7, along with a censure motion against Noda. The main opposition Liberal Democratic Party was also considering its own no-confidence motion and censure motions if Noda did not agree to call a general election. The no-confidence motion was voted down 246 to 86, with the DPJ voting against and the LDP and its partner New Komeito deciding to be absent from the vote after Noda agreed to hold elections "soon".

On August 29, 2012 the House of Councillors passed a censure motion against Noda based on the one previously submitted by the seven opposition parties. The LDP and New Komeito had also been preparing their own censure motion but in the end the LDP, which had supported Noda's consumption tax increase, supported the censure motion of the other seven parties, while New Komeito abstained. While the censure motion was non-binding, the opposition parties planned to boycott the remaining sitting days before the diet session finished on September 8, preventing further legislation from being passed.

== Election results ==
=== House of Representatives ===
Election	Leader	# of seats won	# of Constituency votes	% of Constituency vote	# of PR Block votes	% of PR Block vote	Government/opposition
2005	Yasuo Tanaka	1 / 480	432,679	0.64	1,643,506	2.42	Opposition
2009	Yasuo Tanaka	1 / 480	220,223	0.31	528,171	0.75	Opposition
2012	Yasuo Tanaka	0 / 480	62,697	0.11	—	—	Opposition

=== House of Councillors ===
Election	Leader	# of seats total	# of seats won	# of National votes	% of National vote	# of Prefectural votes	% of Prefectural vote
2007	Yasuo Tanaka	0 / 242	1 / 121	1,770,707	3.01	—	—
