= Yoshihisa Inoue =

Japanese politician

- 井上 義久
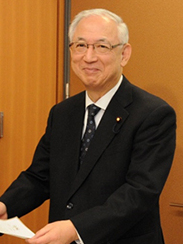
- Inoue in 2017

Member of the House of Representatives
- In office 21 October 1996 – 14 October 2021
- Preceded by: Constituency established
- Succeeded by: Kenichi Shōji
- Constituency: Tohoku PR
- In office 19 February 1990 – 18 June 1993
- Preceded by: Katsuya Ikeda
- Succeeded by: Shinichiro Kurimoto
- Constituency: Tokyo 3rd

Personal details
- Born: 24 July 1947 (age 79) Toyama City, Toyama, Japan
- Party: Komeito
- Other political affiliations: CGP (1990–1994); NFP (1994–1998)
- Education: Tohoku University

Yoshihisa Inoue (井上 義久, Inoue Yoshihisa; born 24 July 1947) is a Japanese politician of the New Komeito Party, a member of the House of Representatives in the Diet (national legislature). A native of Toyama, Toyama and graduate of Tohoku University, he was elected to the House of Representatives for the first time in 1990. He lost his seat in 1993 but was re-elected in 1996.
