= Yuriko Yamakawa =

- 山川 百合子

Mayor of Sōka
- Incumbent
- Assumed office 29 October 2022
- Preceded by: Masashi Asai

Member of the House of Representatives
- In office 22 October 2017 – 14 October 2021
- Constituency: Northern Kanto PR

Member of the Saitama Prefectural Assembly
- In office 30 April 2003 – 29 September 2017
- Constituency: Minami 1st

Personal details
- Born: 14 August 1969 (age 57) Sōka, Saitama, Japan
- Party: Independent (since 2022)
- Other political affiliations: DPJ (2003–2016); DP (2016–2017); CDP (2017–2022)
- Education: Keisen University; University of Hull

Yuriko Yamakawa (Japanese: 山川百合子; born 14 August 1969) is a Japanese politician who has been Mayor of Sōka since 2022. She was a member of the House of Representatives for the Constitutional Democratic Party of Japan between October 2017 and October 2021.

She completed master's degree in Southeast Asian Studies at the University of Hull.
