= Fukushima 4th district =

- Parliamentary constituency for the Japanese House of Representatives
- Numbered map of the Fukushima Prefecture single seats
- Prefecture: Fukushima
- Proportional District: Tohoku
- Electorate: 397,698

Current constituency
- Created: 1994
- Seats: One
- Party: LDP
- Representatives: Ryūtarō Sakamoto
- Municipalities: Iwaki, Minamisōma, Sōma, Futaba District and Sōma District.

Fukushima 4th district (福島県第4区, Fukushima-ken dai-yonku or simply 福島4区, Fukushima-yonku) is a single-member constituency of the House of Representatives in the national Diet of Japan located in Fukushima Prefecture.

== Areas covered ==
=== Since 2022 ===
- Iwaki
- Minamisōma
- Sōma
- Futaba District
- Sōma District

=== 2017 - 2022 ===
- Aizuwakamatsu
- Kitakata
- Minamiaizu District
- Yama District
- Kawanuma District
- Ōnuma District
- Part of Nishishirakawa District
  - Nishigō

=== 2013 - 2017 ===
- Aizuwakamatsu
- Kitakata
- Minamiaizu District
- Yama District
- Kawanuma District
- Ōnuma District

=== 1994 - 2013 ===
- Aizuwakamatsu
- Kitakata
- Minamiaizu District
- Kitaaizu District
- Yama District
- Kawanuma District
- Ōnuma District

== List of representatives ==
Election	Representative	Party	Notes
1996	Kōzō Watanabe	New Frontier	
1996	Kōzō Watanabe	Independent	
2000	Kōzō Watanabe	AoI	
2003	Kōzō Watanabe	AoI	
2005	Kōzō Watanabe	Democratic	
2009	Kōzō Watanabe	Democratic	
2012	Ichiro Kanke	LDP	
2014	Shinji Oguma	Innovation	
2014	Shinji Oguma	Independent	
2014	Shinji Oguma	Reform	
2014	Shinji Oguma	Democratic	
2014	Shinji Oguma	Kibō	
2017	Ichiro Kanke	LDP	
2021	Shinji Oguma	CDP	
2024	Ryūtarō Sakamoto	LDP	
2026	Ryūtarō Sakamoto	LDP	

== Election results ==
=== 2026 ===
2026
Party	Candidate	Votes	%	±%
LDP	Ryutaro Sakamoto	100,795	49.3	▲2.78
Centrist Reform	Yūki Saito	54,672	26.8	▼15.9
DPP	Yota Yamaguchi	38,539	18.9	N/A
JCP	Satoshi Kumagai	10,254	5	▼5.78
Majority		46,123	22.5	▲18.68
Registered electors		389,236		
Turnout		204,260	53.44	▲5.34
LDP hold				

=== 2024 ===
2024
Party	Candidate	Votes	%	±%
LDP	Ryutaro Sakamoto	85,751	46.52	
CDP	Yūki Saito (Won PR seat)	78,708	42.70	
JCP	Tomo Kumagai	19,879	10.78	N/A
Majority		7,043	3.82	
Registered electors		396,483		
Turnout			48.10	▼16.58
LDP gain from CDP				

=== 2021 ===
2021
Party	Candidate	Votes	%	±%
CDP	Shinji Oguma	76,683	50.96	New
LDP	Ichiro Kanke (Won PR seat)	73,784	49.04	
Majority		2,899	1.92	
Registered electors		237,353		
Turnout			64.68	▲1.56
CDP gain from LDP				

=== 2017 ===
2017
Party	Candidate	Votes	%	±%
LDP	Ichiro Kanke	68,282	44.66	
Kibō no Tō	Shinji Oguma (Won PR seat)	67,073	43.86	New
JCP	Yoshinori Furukawa	9,492	6.21	
Social Democratic	Toshio Watanabe	8,063	5.27	
Majority		1,209	0.80	
Registered electors		247,621		
Turnout			63.12	▲5.52
LDP gain from Kibō no Tō				

=== 2014 ===
2014
Party	Candidate	Votes	%	±%
Innovation	Shinji Oguma	56,856	42.80	New
LDP	Ichiro Kanke (Won PR seat)	56,440	42.48	
Social Democratic	Uzen Ogawa	10,139	7.63	
JCP	Wakako Tanaka	9,413	7.09	
Majority		416	0.32	
Registered electors		233,320		
Turnout			58.10	▼5.89
Innovation gain from LDP				

=== 2012 ===
2012
Party	Candidate	Votes	%	±%
LDP	Ichiro Kanke	71,751	49.01	
Your	Shinji Oguma (Won PR seat)	50,036	34.18	
Social Democratic	Uzen Ogawa	15,718	10.74	New
JCP	Toshihiro Harada	8,903	6.08	N/A
Majority		21,715	14.83	
Registered electors		237,918		
Turnout			63.99	▼13.43
LDP gain from Democratic				

=== 2009 ===
2009
Party	Candidate	Votes	%	±%
Democratic	Kōzō Watanabe	91,695	49.40	
LDP	Atsushi Watanabe	49,349	26.59	
Your	Shinji Oguma	42,824	23.07	New
Happiness Realization	Norio Suzuki	1,735	0.93	New
Majority		42,346	22.81	
Registered electors		244,469		
Turnout			77.42	▲1.27
Democratic hold				

=== 2005 ===
2005
Party	Candidate	Votes	%	±%
Democratic	Kōzō Watanabe	91,440	48.48	New
LDP	Atsushi Watanabe (Won PR seat)	84,803	44.96	
JCP	Toshihiro Harada	12,356	6.55	
Majority		6,637	3.52	
Registered electors		252,177		
Turnout			76.15	▲1.86
Democratic hold				

=== 2003 ===
2003
Party	Candidate	Votes	%	±%
Independents	Kōzō Watanabe	97,014	52.26	
LDP	Hideo Yamauchi	78,059	42.05	
JCP	Toshihiro Harada	10,581	5.70	
Majority		18,955	10.21	
Turnout			74.29	
Independents hold				

=== 2000 ===
2000
Party	Candidate	Votes	%	±%
Independents	Kōzō Watanabe	102,631	50.70	New
LDP	Hideo Yamauchi	88,501	43.72	
JCP	Toshihiro Harada	11,312	5.59	
Majority		14,130	6.98	
Turnout				
Independents hold				

=== 1996 ===
1996
Party	Candidate	Votes	%	±%
New Frontier	Kōzō Watanabe	93,960	48.73	New
LDP	Fumiaki Saito	87,643	45.45	New
JCP	Toshihiro Harada	11,226	5.82	New
Majority		6,317	3.28	
Turnout				
New Frontier win (new seat)				
