= Kōzō Watanabe (Democratic Party politician) =

Japanese politician (1932–2020)

- 渡部 恒三
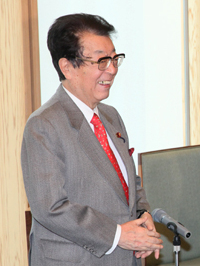
- Watanabe in 2010

Vice Speaker of the House of Representatives
- In office 7 November 1996 – 10 October 2003
- Speaker: Soichiro Ito; Tamisuke Watanuki
- Preceded by: Hyōsuke Kujiraoka
- Succeeded by: Kansei Nakano

Minister of International Trade and Industry
- In office 5 November 1991 – 12 December 1992
- Prime Minister: Kiichi Miyazawa
- Preceded by: Eiichi Nakao
- Succeeded by: Yoshirō Mori

Minister of Home Affairs
- In office 10 August 1989 – 28 February 1990
- Prime Minister: Toshiki Kaifu
- Preceded by: Shigenobu Sakano
- Succeeded by: Keiwa Okuda

Chairman of the National Public Safety Commission
- In office 10 August 1989 – 28 February 1990
- Prime Minister: Toshiki Kaifu
- Preceded by: Shigenobu Sakano
- Succeeded by: Keiwa Okuda

Minister of Health and Welfare
- In office 27 December 1983 – 1 November 1984
- Prime Minister: Yasuhiro Nakasone
- Preceded by: Yoshiro Hayashi
- Succeeded by: Hiroyuki Masuoka

Member of the House of Representatives
- In office 28 December 1969 – 16 November 2012
- Preceded by: Tadao Noguchi
- Succeeded by: Ichirō Kanke
- Constituency: Fukushima 2nd (1969–1996); Fukushima 4th (1996–2012)

Personal details
- Born: 24 May 1932 Tajima, Fukushima, Japan
- Died: 23 August 2020 (aged 88) Aizuwakamatsu, Fukushima, Japan
- Party: DPP (2018–2020)
- Other political affiliations: LDP (before 1993); JRP (1993–1994); NFP (1994–1998); Independent (1998–2005); DPJ (2005–2016); DP (2016–2018)
- Relatives: Yūhei Satō (nephew)
- Education: Waseda University

Kōzō Watanabe (渡部 恒三, Watanabe Kōzō; 24 May 1932 – 23 August 2020) was a Japanese politician of the Democratic Party of Japan, who served as a member of the House of Representatives in the Diet (national legislature). A native of Tajima, Fukushima and graduate of Waseda University, he was elected to the first of his two terms in the assembly of Fukushima Prefecture in 1959 and then to the House of Representatives for the first time in 1969 as an independent. He later joined the Liberal Democratic Party and eventually the DPJ. According to The Economist, he "represented agriculture interests in the Diet".

== Election history ==
| Election | Age | District | Political party | Number of votes | election results |
|---|---|---|---|---|---|
| 1969 Japanese general election | 37 | Fukushima 2nd district | Independent | 45,761 | winning |
| 1972 Japanese general election | 40 | Fukushima 2nd district | LDP | 57,846 | winning |
| 1976 Japanese general election | 44 | Fukushima 2nd district | LDP | 57,553 | winning |
| 1979 Japanese general election | 47 | Fukushima 2nd district | LDP | 73,390 | winning |
| 1980 Japanese general election | 48 | Fukushima 2nd district | LDP | 75,029 | winning |
| 1983 Japanese general election | 51 | Fukushima 2nd district | LDP | 88,116 | winning |
| 1986 Japanese general election | 54 | Fukushima 2nd district | LDP | 104,300 | winning |
| 1990 Japanese general election | 57 | Fukushima 2nd district | LDP | 79,719 | winning |
| 1993 Japanese general election | 61 | Fukushima 2nd district | JRP | 97,303 | winning |
| 1996 Japanese general election | 64 | Fukushima 4th district | NFP | 93,960 | winning |
| 2000 Japanese general election | 68 | Fukushima 4th district | Independent | 102,631 | winning |
| 2003 Japanese general election | 71 | Fukushima 4th district | Independent | 97,014 | winning |
| 2005 Japanese general election | 73 | Fukushima 4th district | DPJ | 91,440 | winning |
| 2009 Japanese general election | 77 | Fukushima 4th district | DPJ | 91,695 | winning |

House of Representatives (Japan)
| Preceded by Hyosuke Kujiraoka | Vice-Speaker of the House of Representatives of Japan; 1996–2003 | Succeeded by Kansei Nakano |
Political offices
| Preceded by Eiichi Nakao | Minister of International Trade and Industry; 1991–1992 | Succeeded by Yoshirō Mori |
| Preceded by Shigenobu Sakano | Minister of Home Affairs; 1989–1990 | Succeeded by Keiwa Okuda |
| Preceded by Shigenobu Sakano | Chairperson of the National Public Safety Commission; 1989-1990 | Succeeded by Keiwa Okuda |
| Preceded by Yoshiro Hayashi | Minister of Health and Welfare; 1983–1984 | Succeeded by Hiroyuki Masuoka |
