= Tohoku proportional representation block =

Japanese House of Representatives constituency

Tōhoku Proportional Representation Block
- Parliamentary constituency for the Japanese House of Representatives
- Map of House of Representatives proportional blocks, with the Tōhoku block highlighted
- Prefectures: Aomori, Iwate, Miyagi, Akita, Yamagata, and Fukushima
- Electorate: 7,027,029 (2026)

Current constituency
- Created: 1994
- Number of members: 12

The Tōhoku proportional representation block (比例[代表]東北ブロック, Hirei [daihyō] Tōhoku burokku) is one of eleven proportional representation (PR) blocks for the House of Representatives in the Diet of Japan. It consists of the Tōhoku region, namely the prefectures of Aomori, Iwate, Miyagi, Akita, Yamagata and Fukushima. Upon the introduction of proportional voting at the 1996 general election, the block elected 16 Representatives to the House. The block's representation was reduced to 14 Representatives at the 2000 general election, and to 13 in the 2017 election.

== Results timeline ==
=== Vote share ===
Party	1996	2000	2003	2005	2009	2012	2014	2017	2021	2024	2026
LDP	35.27	31.96	37.63	36.55	27.87	28.55	32.94	35.49	39.51	31.45	41.16
NFP	33.15										
DPJ (Note: 1996 DP)	11.10	21.19	37.43	33.60	45.48	18.57	22.48				
JCP	9.58	8.09	6.57	6.25	5.89	5.92	9.89	7.39	7.11	5.91	4.05
SDP	8.27	10.70	6.51	6.97	5.92	3.70	3.43	2.51	2.46	2.10	1.43
LP		16.27									
Komeito		9.81	11.85	11.93	9.65	9.18	11.22	11.03	11.08	9.72	
PNP				4.71							
Your					4.51	7.06					
Ishin (Note: 2012 JRP, 2014 JIP)						16.71	13.00	3.04	6.28	4.38	4.21
TPJ						9.02					
PLP							4.72				
KnT								21.72			
CDP								18.11	24.06	26.26	
DPFP									4.75	10.50	9.94
Reiwa									3.48	7.19	3.10
Sanseitō										2.50	7.11
CRA											21.16
Mirai											5.97
CPJ											1.86
Others	3.84 (Note: NSP 1.82, LL 0.84)	1.99 (Note: Assembly of Independents 1.72, LL 0.27)			0.68 (Note: HRP 0.68)	1.30 (Note: NRP 0.96, HRP 0.34)	2.32 (Note: Generations 1.85, HRP 0.47)	1.61 (Note: Kokoro 1.07, HRP 0.54)	1.28 (Note: NHK 1.28)		
Turnout		66.39	63.96	68.91	71.21	58.92	52.55	57.04	57.84	54.81	56.75

=== Seat distribution ===
Election	Distribution	Seats
1996		16
2000		14
2003		14
2005		14
2009		14
2012		14
2014		14
2017		13
2021		13
2024		12
2026		12

== List of representatives ==
Elected Representatives
Tenure	1996-2000	2000-03		2003-05	2005-09	2009-12		2012-14	2014-17	2017-21	2021-24	2024-pres.
Rep. Party	Zenmei Matsumoto; JCP			Chizuko Takahashi; JCP						Akinori Eto; LDP	Jun Tsushima; LDP	Akinori Eto; LDP
Rep. Party	Kenjirō Hatakeyama; SDP	Tetsuo Kanno; SDP		Kiyohiro Yamamoto; SDP	Tetsuo Kanno; SDP	Hideo Yoshiizumi; SDP		Kōji Hata; TPJ -> PLP	Emi Kaneko; DPJ -> DP	Manabu Terata; KnT -> Ind. -> CDP	Akiko Okamoto; CDP	Yuki Baba; CDP
Rep. Party	Ichirō Hino (died 2003); DPJ		Masayo Tanabu; DPJ	Kiyohito Hashimoto; DPJ	Masayo Tanabu; DPJ			Kazuko Kōri; DPJ -> DP		Akiko Okamoto; CDP	Kenya Akiba; LDP	Chisato Morishita; LDP
Rep. Party	Kenji Kodama; DPJ	Takao Satō; DPJ		Yōsuke Kondō; DPJ		Noriko Nakanowatami; DPJ		Yōsuke Kondō; DPJ -> DP		Yoshitami Kameoka; LDP	Ichirō Kanke; LDP	Manabu Terata; CDP
Rep. Party	Yasusuke Konta; NFP -> DPJ	Yasasuke Konta; DPJ		Izumi Yoshida; DPJ		Kazuo Takamatsu; DPJ		Izumi Yoshida; DPJ	Manabu Terata; DPJ -> DP	Takashi Fujiwara; LDP	Manabu Terata; CDP	Daijiro Kikuchi; DPP
Rep. Party	Kijūrō Sugahara; NFP -> Lib.	Kijūrō Sugahara (resigned 2001); Lib.	Kentarō Ishihara; Lib.	Michihiko Kano; DPJ	Kazuko Kōri; DPJ	Kazuyuki Yamaguchi; DPJ		Shinji Oguma; JRP -> JIP	Sekio Masuta; JIP -> DP	Shinji Oguma; KnT -> DPP -> CDP	Kenichi Shōji; Komeito	Junji Fukuhara; LDP
Rep. Party	Tatsuo Sasayama; NFP -> Lib.	Kentarō Kudō; Lib.		Teruhiko Mashiko; DPJ	Hokuto Yokoyama; DPJ	Kyōichi Tsushima; DPJ		Toshihide Muraoka; JRP -> JIP	Toshihide Muraoka; JIP -> Vision of Reform -> DP	Yoshihisa Inoue; Komeito	Junji Fukuhara; LDP	Kenichi Shōji; Komeito
Rep. Party	Yoshihisa Inoue; NFP -> Komeito	Yoshihisa Inoue; Komeito								Makoto Yamazaki; CDP	Ichirō Ozawa; CDP	Sekio Masuta; CDP
Rep. Party	Kōdō Kohata; NFP -> DPJ	Yoshinobu Takahashi; Lib.		Masashi Nakano; LDP		Miki Wajima (resigned in 2012); DPJ	Ippu Watanabe; DPJ	Hiroki Hayashi; YP -> Unity Party -> JIP	Yūichi Mayama; Komeito	Hinako Takahashi; LDP	Katsutoshi Kaneda; LDP	Nobuhide Minorikawa; LDP
Rep. Party	Kōki Hagino; NFP -> LDP	Kōki Hagino; LDP			Atsushi Watanabe; LDP	Chōuemon Kikuchi; DPJ		Sachiko Kanno; LDP	Ichirō Kanke; LDP	Chizuko Takahashi; JCP		Wakako Sawara; Reiwa
Rep. Party	Hidefumi Minorikawa (died 2003); LDP		Kyōichi Tsushima; LDP		Tatsuo Satō; LDP	Katsutoshi Kaneda; LDP		Miyo Ōkubo; LDP	Shigeaki Katsunama; LDP	Takashi Midorikawa; KnT -> DPP -> CDP	Kentarō Uesugi; LDP	Yuki Saito; CDP
Rep. Party	Ichio Kumagai; LDP			Tokuichirō Tamazawa; LDP		Kenya Akiba; LDP		Hinako Takahashi; LDP		Kentarō Uesugi; LDP	Atsushi Hayasaka; Ishin	Taku Nemoto; LDP
Rep. Party	Kōji Futada; LDP	Hiroyuki Arai; LDP		Kōji Futada; LDP		Masayoshi Yoshino; LDP		Hidenori Hashimoto; LDP		Yukihiko Akutsu; CDP	Yuki Baba; CDP	Seat abolished
Rep. Party	Toshiaki Endō; LDP	Kōji Sakamoto; LDP		Masayoshi Yoshino; LDP	Kōji Sakamoto; LDP	Toshiaki Endō; LDP		Takashi Fujiwara; LDP		Seat abolished		
Rep. Party	Tokuichirō Tamazawa; LDP	Seat abolished										
Rep. Party	Yoshiyuki Hozumi; LDP	Seat abolished										

== Election results ==
=== 2026 ===
2026 results in the Tohoku PR block
Party	Votes	Swing	%	Seats	+/–
Liberal Democratic Party (LDP)	1,612,576	41.16	▲9.71	6	▲1
Centrist Reform Alliance (CRA) (Note: Swings compared to CDP and Komeito)	828,883	21.16	▼14.82	3	▼2
Democratic Party For the People (DPFP)	389,503	9.94	▼0.56	1	0
Sanseitō	278,410	7.11	▲4.61	1	▲1
Team Mirai	234,050	5.97	New	1	New
Japan Innovation Party (Ishin)	165,104	4.21	▼0.17	0	0
Japanese Communist Party (JCP)	158,466	4.05	▼1.86	0	0
Reiwa Shinsengumi (Reiwa)	121,631	3.10	▼4.09	0	▼1
Conservative Party of Japan (CPJ)	72,889	1.86	New	0	New
Social Democratic Party (SDP)	55,999	1.43	▼0.67	0	0
Total	3,917,511	100.00		12	
Invalid votes	70,440	1.77			
Turnout	3,987,951	56.75	▲1.94		
Registered voters	7,027,029				

=== 2024 ===
2024 results in the Tohoku PR block
Party	Votes	Swing	%	Seats	+/–
Liberal Democratic Party (LDP)	1,188,975	31.45	▼8.06	5	▼1
Constitutional Democratic Party of Japan (CDP)	993,007	26.26	▲2.20	4	0
Democratic Party For the People (DPFP)	396,991	10.50	▲5.75	1	▲1
Komeito	367,341	9.72	▼1.36	1	0
Reiwa Shinsengumi (Reiwa)	271,855	7.19	▲3.71	1	▲1
Japanese Communist Party (JCP)	223,409	5.91	▼1.20	0	▼1
Japan Innovation Party (Ishin)	165,697	4.38	▼1.90	0	▼1
Sanseitō	94,354	2.50	New	0	New
Social Democratic Party (SDP)	79,484	2.10	▼0.36	0	0
Total	3,781,113	100.00		12	▼1
Invalid votes	127,427	3.37			
Turnout	3,908,540	54.81	▼3.03		
Registered voters	7,131,539				

=== 2021 ===
2021 results in the Tohoku PR block
Party	Votes	Swing	%	Seats	+/–
Liberal Democratic Party (LDP)	1,628,233	39.51	▲4.02	6	▲1
Constitutional Democratic Party of Japan (CDP)	991,505	24.06	▲5.95	4	▲1
Komeito	456,387	11.08	▲0.05	1	0
Japanese Communist Party (JCP)	292,830	7.11	▼0.28	1	0
Japan Innovation Party (Ishin)	258,690	6.28	▲3.24	1	▲1
Democratic Party For the People (DPFP)	195,754	4.75	New	0	New
Reiwa Shinsengumi (Reiwa)	143,265	3.48	New	0	New
Social Democratic Party (SDP)	101,442	2.46	▼0.05	0	0
NHK Party	52,664	1.28	New	0	New
Total	4,120,770	100.00		13	
Invalid votes	138,904	3.26			
Turnout	4,259,674	57.84	▲0.80		
Registered voters	7,364,980				

=== 2017 ===
2017 results in the Tohoku PR block
Party	Votes	Swing	%	Seats	+/–
Liberal Democratic Party (LDP)	1,453,871	35.49	▲1.65	5	0
Kibō no Tō	912,819	21.72	New	3	New
Constitutional Democratic Party of Japan (CDP)	761,117	18.11	New	3	New
Komeito	463,740	11.03	▼0.19	1	▼1
Japanese Communist Party (JCP)	310,559	7.39	▼2.50	1	0
Japan Innovation Party (Ishin)	127,674	3.04	New	0	New
Social Democratic Party (SDP)	105,589	2.51	▼0.92	0	0
Party for Japanese Kokoro	44,960	1.07	▼0.78	0	0
Happiness Realization Party (HRP)	22,626	0.54	▲0.07	0	0
Total	4,202,955	100.00		13	▼1
Invalid votes	129,515	2.99			
Turnout	4,332,470	57.04	▲4.49		
Registered voters	7,595,912				

=== 2014 ===
2014 results in the Tohoku PR block
Party	Votes	Swing	%	Seats	+/–
Liberal Democratic Party (LDP)	1,265,372	32.94	▲4.39	5	0
Democratic Party of Japan (DPJ)	863,539	22.48	▲3.91	4	▲1
Japan Innovation Party (JIP)	499,437	13.00	▼3.71	2	0
Komeito	431,169	11.22	▲2.04	2	▲1
Japanese Communist Party (JCP)	379,811	9.89	▲3.97	1	0
People's Life Party (PLP)	181,487	4.72	New	0	New
Social Democratic Party (SDP)	131,857	3.43	▼0.27	0	0
Party for Future Generations	71,026	1.85	New	0	New
Happiness Realization Party (HRP)	18,201	0.47	▲0.13	0	0
Total	3,841,899	100.00		14	
Invalid votes	130,359	3.28			
Turnout	3,972,258	52.55	▼6.37		
Registered voters	7,558,365				

=== 2012 ===
2012 results in the Tohoku PR block
Party	Votes	Swing	%	Seats	+/–
Liberal Democratic Party (LDP)	1,238,716	28.55	▲0.68	5	▲1
Democratic Party of Japan (DPJ)	805,709	18.57	▼26.91	3	▼4
Japan Restoration Party (JRP)	725,006	16.71	New	2	New
Komeito	398,131	9.18	▼0.47	1	0
Tomorrow Party of Japan (TPJ)	391,216	9.02	New	1	New
Your Party	306,102	7.06	▲2.55	1	▲1
Japanese Communist Party (JCP)	256,838	5.92	▲0.03	1	0
Social Democratic Party (SDP)	160,367	3.70	▼2.22	0	▼1
New Renaissance Party	41,587	0.96	New	0	New
Happiness Realization Party (HRP)	14,825	0.34	▼0.34	0	0
Total	4,338,497	100.00		14	
Invalid votes	148,075	3.30			
Turnout	4,486,572	58.92	▼12.29		
Registered voters	7,614,547				

=== 2009 ===
2009 results in the Tohoku PR block
Party	Votes	Swing	%	Seats	+/–
Democratic Party of Japan (DPJ)	2,433,836	45.48	▲11.88	7	▲2
Liberal Democratic Party (LDP)	1,491,761	27.87	▼8.68	4	▼2
Komeito	516,688	9.65	▼2.28	1	0
Social Democratic Party (SDP)	316,635	5.92	▼1.05	1	0
Japanese Communist Party (JCP)	315,201	5.89	▼0.36	1	0
Your Party	241,445	4.51	New	0	New
Happiness Realization Party (HRP)	36,295	0.68	New	0	New
Total	5,351,861	100.00		14	
Invalid votes	162,523	2.95			
Turnout	5,514,384	71.21	▲2.30		
Registered voters	7,743,422				

=== 2005 ===
2005 results in the Tohoku PR block
Party	Votes	Swing	%	Seats	+/–
Liberal Democratic Party (LDP)	1,901,595	36.55	▼1.08	6	0
Democratic Party of Japan (DPJ)	1,748,165	33.60	▼3.83	5	0
Komeito	620,638	11.93	▲0.08	1	0
Social Democratic Party (SDP)	362,523	6.97	▲0.46	1	0
Japanese Communist Party (JCP)	325,176	6.25	▼0.32	1	0
People's New Party (PNP)	244,933	4.71	New	0	New
Total	5,203,030	100.00		14	
Invalid votes	199,489	3.69			
Turnout	5,402,519	68.91	▲4.95		
Registered voters	7,839,466				

=== 2003 ===
2003 results in the Tohoku PR block
Party	Votes	Swing	%	Seats	+/–
Liberal Democratic Party (LDP)	1,794,284	37.63	▲5.67	6	▲1
Democratic Party of Japan (DPJ)	1,784,768	37.43	▲16.24	5	▲2
Komeito	565,179	11.85	▲2.04	1	0
Japanese Communist Party (JCP)	313,290	6.57	▼1.52	1	0
Social Democratic Party (SDP)	310,187	6.51	▼4.19	1	0
Total	4,767,708	100.00		14	
Invalid votes	244,942	4.89			
Turnout	5,012,650	63.96	▼2.43		
Registered voters	7,836,650				

=== 2000 ===
2000 results in the Tohoku PR block
Party	Votes	Swing	%	Seats	+/–
Liberal Democratic Party (LDP)	1,545,028	31.96	▼3.31	5	▼1
Democratic Party of Japan (DPJ)	1,024,253	21.19	▲10.09	3	▲1
Liberal Party (LP)	786,751	16.27	New	3	New
Social Democratic Party (SDP)	517,267	10.70	▲2.43	1	0
Komeito	474,238	9.81	New	1	New
Japanese Communist Party (JCP)	391,055	8.09	▼1.49	1	0
Assembly of Independents	82,978	1.72	New	0	New
Liberal League (LL)	13,196	0.27	▼0.57	0	0
Total	4,834,766	100.00		14	▼2
Invalid votes	327,077	6.34			
Turnout	5,161,843	66.39			
Registered voters	7,774,608				

=== 1996 ===
1996 results in the Tohoku PR block
Party	Votes	%	Seats
Liberal Democratic Party (LDP)	1,630,777	35.27	6
New Frontier Party (NFP)	1,532,987	33.15	6
Democratic Party (DP)	513,410	11.10	2
Japanese Communist Party (JCP)	442,790	9.58	1
Social Democratic Party (SDP)	382,271	8.27	1
New Socialist Party (NSP)	84,167	1.82	0
Liberal League (LL)	37,661	0.84	0
Total	4,624,063	100.00	16
