= Shinji Oguma =

Japanese politician (born 1968)

- 小熊 慎司
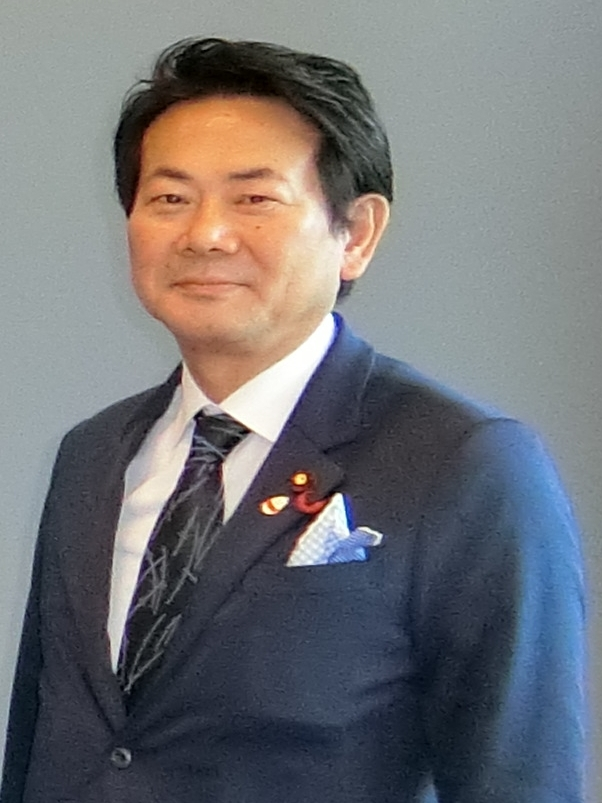
- Oguma in 2018

Member of the House of Representatives; from Tohoku
- In office 18 December 2012 – 23 January 2026
- Preceded by: Multi-member district
- Succeeded by: Kentarō Uesugi
- Constituency: See list: PR block (2012–2014); Fukushima 4th (2014–2017); PR block (2017–2021); Fukushima 4th (2021–2024); Fukushima 3rd (2024–2026)

Member of the House of Councillors
- In office 26 July 2010 – 4 December 2012
- Constituency: National PR

Member of the Fukushima Prefectural Assembly
- In office 2003–2009
- Constituency: Aizuwakamatsu City

Member of the Aizuwakamatsu City Assembly
- In office 1999–2003

Personal details
- Born: 16 June 1968 (age 58) Kitakata, Fukushima, Japan
- Party: CRA (since 2026)
- Other political affiliations: LDP (before 2009); Your Party (2009–2012); JRP (2012–2014); JIP (2014–2015); VoR (2015–2016); DP (2016–2017); KnT (2017–2018); DPP (2018–2020); CDP (2020–2026)
- Education: Senshu University

Shinji Oguma (小熊慎司, Oguma Shinji; born 16 June 1968) is a Japanese politician who served as a member of the House of Representatives from 2012 to 2026. From 2010 to 2012, he was a member of the House of Councillors.
