= New Renaissance Party =

New Renaissance Party 新党改革 Shintō Kaikaku
- President: Hiroyuki Arai
- Founders: Hideo Watanabe; Hiroyuki Arai
- Founded: 23 April 2010
- Dissolved: 25 July 2017
- Headquarters: 2-16-5, Hirakawacho, Chiyoda, Tokyo, Japan
- Ideology: Conservatism

Website
- shintokaikaku.jp

The New Renaissance Party (新党改革, Shintō Kaikaku) was a minor political party in Japan.

== History ==
The NRP is the successor to the Japan Renaissance Party (Japanese: 改革クラブ, lit. 'Reform Club'), founded by Hideo Watanabe and Hiroyuki Arai in August 2008.

In April 2010, Yōichi Masuzoe, a former Minister of Health, Labour and Welfare and member of the Liberal Democratic Party, defected from the LDP to join the Japan Renaissance Party as president. He renamed the party the "New Renaissance Party." Along with Your Party led by Yoshimi Watanabe, the NRP was viewed as a possible center-right counterweight to the LDP. However, four of its initial six Upper House members were voted out in the July 2010 election, leaving the party with only Masuzoe and Arai representing it in the Upper House. The NRP was ultimately overshadowed by Your Party as a reformist element.

On August 3, 2012 the party in concert with six other minor opposition parties (People's Life First, Kizuna Party, Social Democratic Party, Your Party, New Party Nippon (which has no lower-house lawmaker) and the Japanese Communist Party) agreed to submit a no confidence motion against Prime Minister Yoshihiko Noda in an effort to block the passage of the bill raising Japan's consumption tax from 5% to 10%. In the Japanese diet the support of 51 lawmakers is required to submit a co-confidence motion to the lower house. The motion was submitted to the lower house on August 7, along with a censure motion against Noda. The main opposition Liberal Democratic Party was also considering its own no-confidence motion and censure motions if Noda did not agree to call a general election. The no-confidence motion was voted down 246 to 86, with the DPJ voting against and the LDP and its partner New Komeito deciding to be absent from the vote after Noda agreed to hold elections "soon".

On August 29, 2012 the House of Councillors passed a censure motion against Noda based on the one previously submitted by the seven opposition parties. The LDP and New Komeito had also been preparing their own censure motion but in the end the LDP, which had supported Noda's consumption tax increase, supported the censure motion of the other seven parties, while New Komeito abstained. While the censure motion was non-binding, the opposition parties planned to boycott the remaining sitting days before the diet session finished on September 8, preventing further legislation from being passed.

Following the resounding victory of Abe and the LDP in the 2012 general election, in which the NRP failed to win a single seat, Masuzoe announced in June 2013 that he would not stand for re-election in the July 2013 House of Councillors election, stating that "I have done the best I could for nearly three years, but I was unable to boost [the party's] strength." After the election, Hiroyuki Arai was elected president of the NRP on July 22.

Two independents, Kazuyuki Hamada and Tatsuo Hirano, joined the NRP's caucus in the House of Councillors on July 24, and the NRP upper house caucus was renamed "New Renaissance Party and Group of Independents" (新党改革・無所属の会, NRP-GI).

The party was unable to obtain seats in the July 2016 election, and the party broke up on 25 July 2017.

== Policy ==
The New Renaissance Party is in favour of decentralization. It also supports the legalization of medical marijuana and allowing research into it.

== Election results ==
=== House of Councillors ===
Election	Leader	# of seats total	# of seats won	# of National votes	% of National vote	# of Prefectural votes	% of Prefectural vote
2010	Yōichi Masuzoe	1 / 242	2 / 121	1,172,395	2.01	625,431	1.07
