= 2026 Japanese general election in Tohoku =

- 8 February 2026

All 33 seats to the House of Representatives
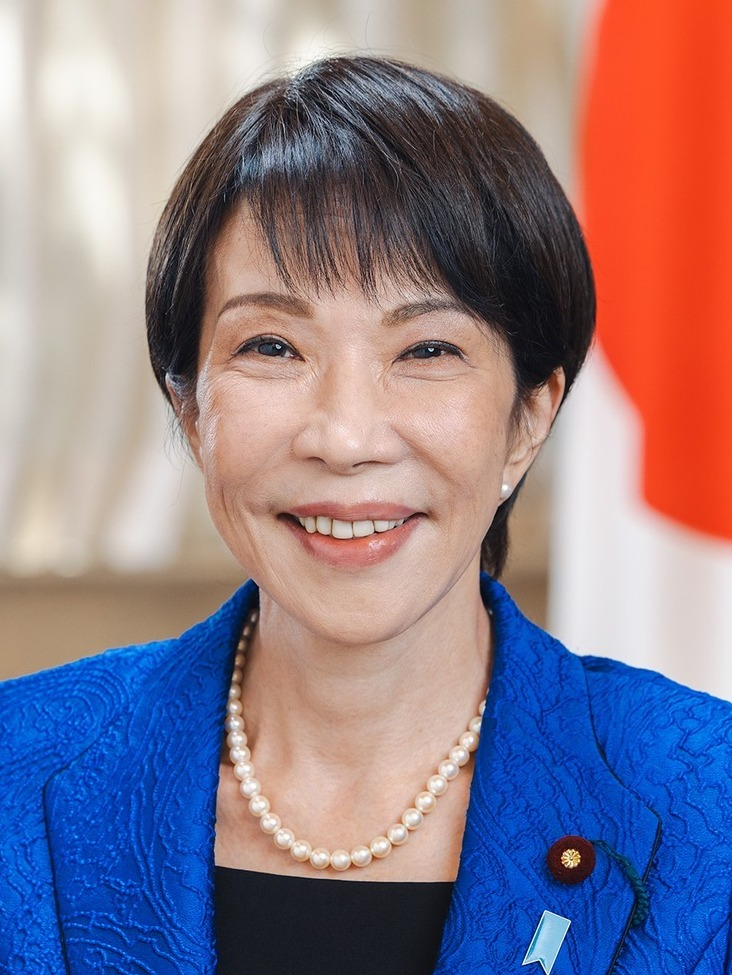

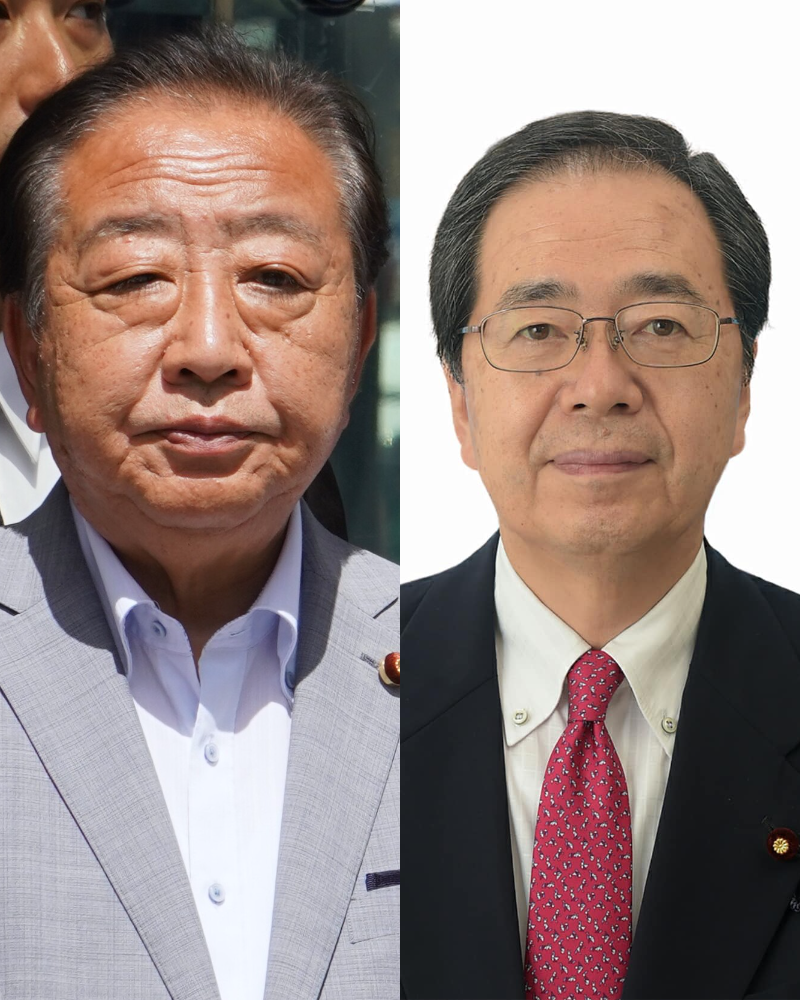

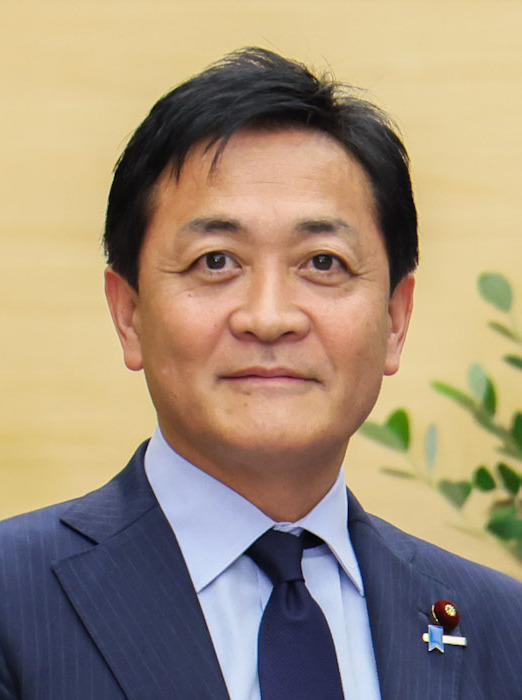

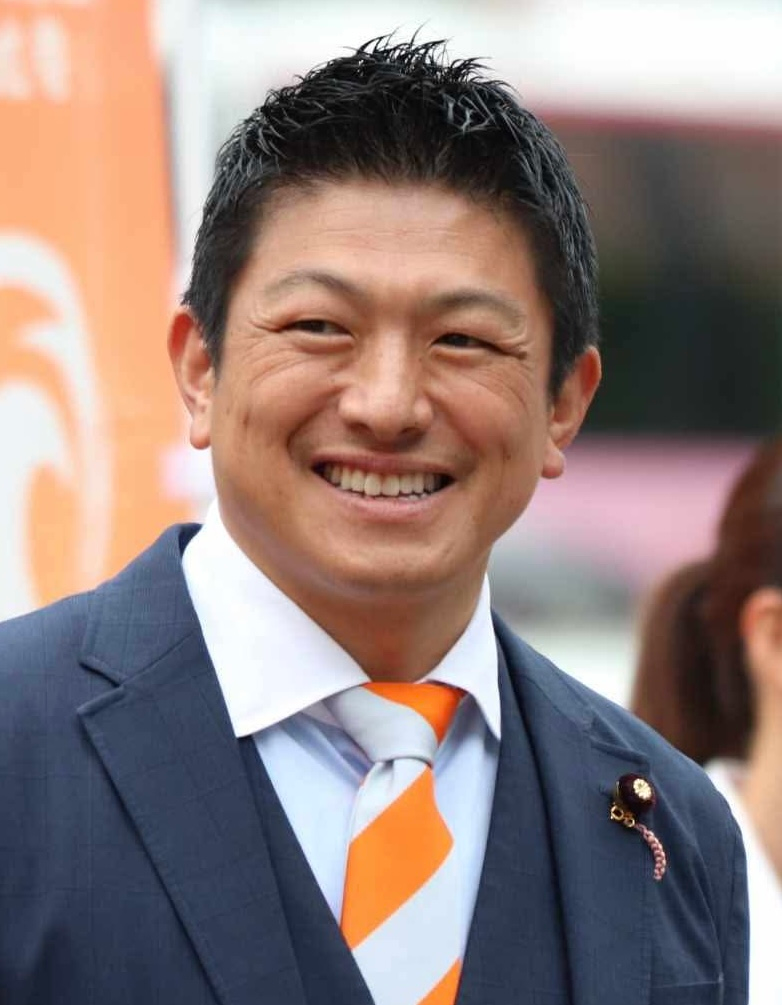

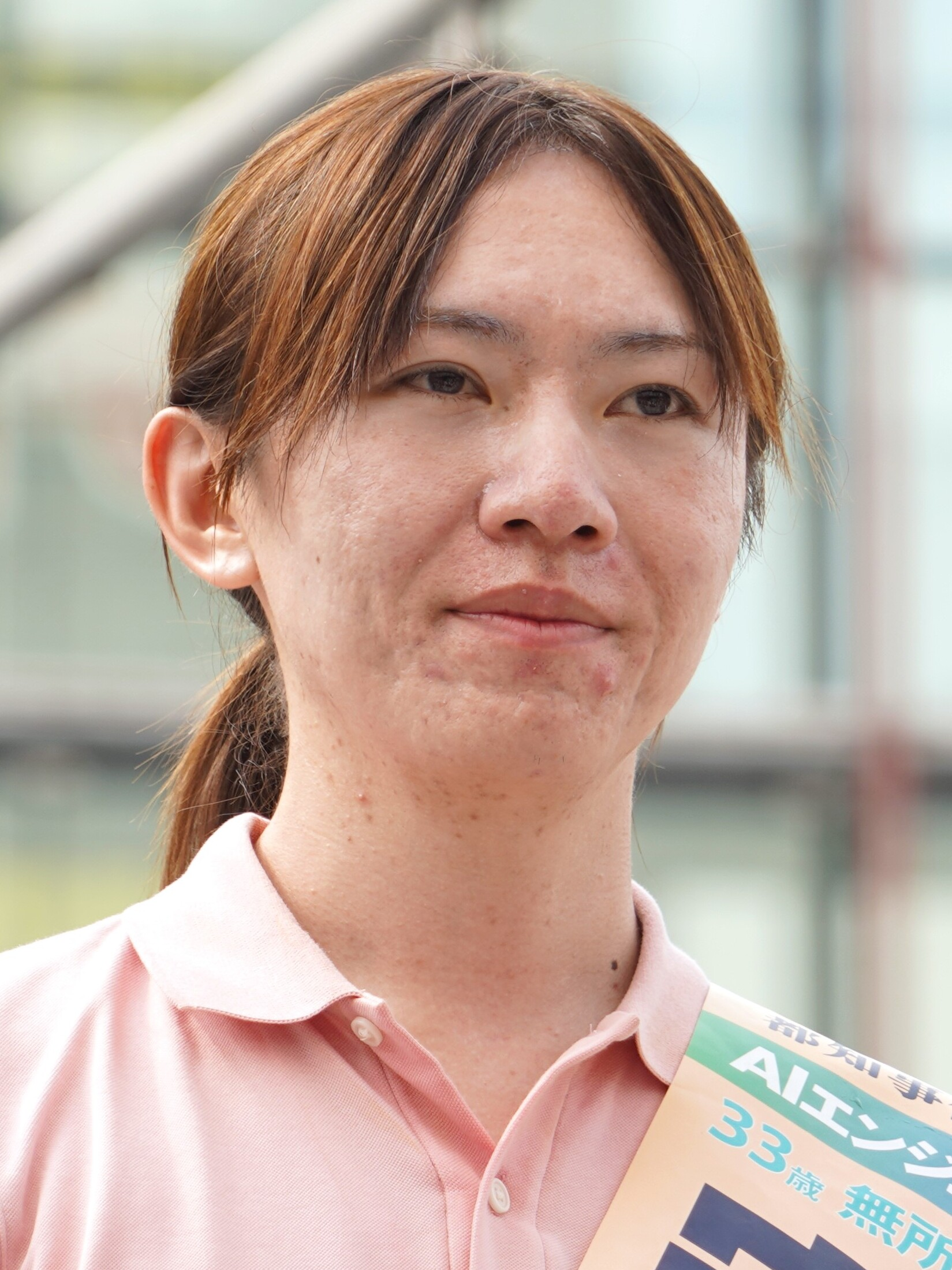
	Majority party	Minority party	Third party
Party	LDP	Centrist Reform	DPP
Last election	14 seats	16 seats (Note: As CDP and Komeito)	2 seats
Con. vote	2,091,496; 53.44%	1,101,761; 28.15%	343,945; 8.79%
Con. seats	19	1	1
PR vote	1,612,576; 41.16%	828,883; 21.16%	389,503; 9.94%
PR seats	6	3	1
Total seats	25	4	2
Seat change	▲11	▼12	0
	Fourth party	Fifth party
Party	Sanseito	Team Mirai
Last election	0 seats	Did not exist
Con. vote	213,681; 5.46%	–
Con. seats	0	–
PR vote	278,410; 7.11%	234,050; 5.97%
PR seats	1	1
Total seats	1	1
Seat change	▲1	▲1

This page contains the detailed results for the 2026 Japanese general election in the Tohoku proportional representation block.

The Tohoku block covers the prefectures of Aomori, Iwate, Miyagi, Akita, Yamagata and Fukushima and elects 12 members by party-list proportional representation. In addition to the block seats, Tohoku has 21 constituencies each electing a single member by first-past-the-post voting.

== Overall results ==
Party	Constituency			Proportional			Total seats
Party	Votes	%	Seats	Votes	%	Seats	Total seats
Liberal Democratic Party	2,091,496	53.44	19	1,612,576	41.16	6	25
Centrist Reform Alliance	1,101,761	28.15	1	828,883	21.16	3	4
Democratic Party For the People	343,945	8.79	1	389,503	9.94	1	2
Sanseito	213,681	5.46	0	278,410	7.11	1	1
Team Mirai				234,050	5.97	1	1
Nippon Ishin no Kai	40,483	1.03	0	165,104	4.21	0	0
Japanese Communist Party	74,555	1.90	0	158,466	4.05	0	0
Reiwa Shinsengumi	8,570	0.22	0	121,631	3.10	0	0
Conservative Party of Japan				72,889	1.86	0	0
Social Democratic Party				55,999	1.43	0	0
Total	3,913,981	100.00	21	3,917,511	100.00	12	33
Invalid/blank votes				70,440	1.77		
Voter turnout				3,987,951	56.75		
Registered voters	7,027,029			7,027,029			

== Single-member constituencies ==
Single-member constituency results in Tohoku
Constituency	Previous member		Elected member		Votes	%	Margin	Status
Aomori 1st	Jun Tsushima	LDP	Jun Tsushima	LDP	72,060	50.9	25,824	LDP hold
Aomori 2nd	Junichi Kanda	LDP	Junichi Kanda	LDP	104,608	54.6	53,581	LDP hold
Aomori 3rd	Hanako Okada	CRA	Jiro Kimura	LDP	83,547	52.3	15,943	LDP gain from CRA
Iwate 1st	Takeshi Shina	CRA	Takeshi Shina	CRA	73,209	44.2	5,398	CRA hold
Iwate 2nd	Shun'ichi Suzuki	LDP	Shun'ichi Suzuki	LDP	123,711	64.8	56,417	LDP hold
Iwate 3rd	Ichirō Ozawa	CRA	Takashi Fujiwara	LDP	102,578	48.6	23,847	LDP gain from CRA
Miyagi 1st	Akiko Okamoto	CRA	Tōru Doi	LDP	110,185	45.0	32,079	LDP gain from CRA
Miyagi 2nd	Sayuri Kamata	CRA	Katsuyuki Watanabe	LDP	101,364	41.4	27,669	LDP gain from CRA
Miyagi 3rd	Tsuyoshi Yanagisawa	CRA	Akihiro Nishimura	LDP	83,705	54.7	36,402	LDP gain from CRA
Miyagi 4th	Jun Azumi	CRA	Chisato Morishita	LDP	124,250	57.1	45,579	LDP gain from CRA
Miyagi 5th	Itsunori Onodera	LDP	Itsunori Onodera	LDP	138,094	77.4	107,403	LDP hold
Akita 1st	Hiroyuki Togashi	LDP	Hiroyuki Togashi	LDP	65,940	46.5	40,430	LDP hold
Akita 2nd	Takashi Midorikawa	CRA	Junji Fukuhara	LDP	70,352	55.0	12,686	LDP gain from CRA
Akita 3rd	Toshihide Muraoka	DPFP	Toshihide Muraoka	DPFP	87,573	50.7	2,510	DPFP hold
Yamagata 1st	Toshiaki Endo	LDP	Hiroaki Endo	LDP	106,063	61.2	57,620	LDP hold
Yamagata 2nd	Norikazu Suzuki	LDP	Norikazu Suzuki	LDP	124,512	68.3	74,708	LDP hold
Yamagata 3rd	Ayuko Kato	LDP	Ayuko Kato	LDP	90,730	58.2	58,298	LDP hold
Fukushima 1st	Emi Kaneko	CRA	Naotoshi Nishiyama	LDP	99,531	45.2	6,060	LDP gain from CRA
Fukushima 2nd	Kōichirō Genba	CRA	Taku Nemoto	LDP	128,948	52.0	38,802	LDP gain from CRA
Fukushima 3rd	Shinji Oguma	CRA	Kentaro Uesugi	LDP	107,649	57.0	30,638	LDP gain from CRA
Fukushima 4th	Ryutaro Sakamoto	LDP	Ryutaro Sakamoto	LDP	100,795	49.3	46,123	LDP hold

=== Aomori Prefecture ===
Aomori Prefecture
Party	Constituency			Proportional	
Party	Votes	%	Seats	Votes	%
Liberal Democratic Party	260,215	52.79	3	207,510	42.17
Centrist Reform Alliance	164,849	33.45	0	111,047	22.56
Democratic Party For the People	30,016	6.09	0	41,857	8.51
Sanseito	14,181	2.88	0	32,441	6.59
Team Mirai				25,042	5.09
Japanese Communist Party	15,048	3.05	0	21,576	4.38
Nippon Ishin no Kai				17,605	3.58
Reiwa Shinsengumi	8,570	1.74	0	17,285	3.51
Conservative Party of Japan				10,166	2.07
Social Democratic Party				7,609	1.55
Total	492,879	100.00	3	492,138	100.00
Invalid/blank votes					
Voter turnout					
Registered voters					

Aomori 1st district
Party	Candidate	Constituency		Proportional	
Party	Candidate	Votes	%	Votes	%
Liberal Democratic Party	Jun Tsushima	72,060	50.89	56,974	40.22
Centrist Reform Alliance	Sekio Masuta	46,218	32.64	33,426	23.59
Democratic Party For the People				10,884	7.68
Sanseito	Tsutomu Kato	14,181	10.01	9,939	7.02
Team Mirai				7,671	5.41
Japanese Communist Party	Mio Saito	9,139	6.45	7,635	5.39
Nippon Ishin no Kai				5,108	3.61
Reiwa Shinsengumi				4,363	3.08
Conservative Party of Japan				3,119	2.20
Social Democratic Party				2,550	1.80
Total		141,598	100.00	141,669	100.00
Invalid/blank votes					
Voter turnout			44.86		
Registered voters		321,638		321,638	
LDP hold					

Aomori 2nd district
Party	Candidate	Constituency		Proportional	
Party	Candidate	Votes	%	Votes	%
Liberal Democratic Party	Junichi Kanda	104,608	54.61	82,772	43.36
Centrist Reform Alliance	Kazuhiko Matsuo	51,027	26.64	41,284	21.63
Democratic Party For the People	Akira Kanehama	30,016	15.67	19,421	10.17
Sanseito				12,527	6.56
Team Mirai				9,740	5.10
Nippon Ishin no Kai				6,795	3.56
Japanese Communist Party	Sho Kubo	5,909	3.08	5,979	3.13
Reiwa Shinsengumi				5,857	3.07
Conservative Party of Japan				3,828	2.01
Social Democratic Party				2,670	1.40
Total		191,560	100.00	190,873	100.00
Invalid/blank votes					
Voter turnout			52.49		
Registered voters		369,866		369,866	
LDP hold					

Aomori 3rd district
Party	Candidate	Constituency		Proportional	
Party	Candidate	Votes	%	Votes	%
Liberal Democratic Party	Jiro Kimura	83,547	52.31	67,764	42.46
Centrist Reform Alliance	Hanako Okada	67,604	42.33	36,337	22.77
Democratic Party For the People				11,552	7.24
Sanseito				9,975	6.25
Team Mirai				7,631	4.78
Nippon Ishin no Kai				5,702	3.57
Japanese Communist Party				7,962	4.99
Reiwa Shinsengumi	Wakako Sawara	8,570	5.37	7,065	4.43
Conservative Party of Japan				3,219	2.02
Social Democratic Party				2,389	1.50
Total		159,721	100.00	159,596	100.00
Invalid/blank votes					
Voter turnout			50.18		
Registered voters		325,679		325,679	
LDP gain from CRA					

=== Iwate Prefecture ===
Iwate Prefecture
Party	Constituency			Proportional	
Party	Votes	%	Seats	Votes	%
Liberal Democratic Party	294,100	51.78	2	218,970	38.48
Centrist Reform Alliance	151,940	26.75	1	126,468	22.23
Democratic Party For the People	67,294	11.85	0	56,518	9.93
Sanseito	42,064	7.41	0	41,841	7.35
Team Mirai				33,081	5.81
Japanese Communist Party	10,448	1.84	0	27,502	4.83
Reiwa Shinsengumi				22,328	3.92
Nippon Ishin no Kai				21,286	3.74
Social Democratic Party				11,027	1.94
Conservative Party of Japan				10,008	1.76
Independents	2,080	0.37	0		
Total	567,926	100.00	3	569,029	100.00
Invalid/blank votes					
Voter turnout					
Registered voters					

Iwate 1st district
Party	Candidate	Constituency		Proportional	
Party	Candidate	Votes	%	Votes	%
Centrist Reform Alliance	Takeshi Shina	73,209	44.16	38,974	23.61
Liberal Democratic Party	Hiromasa Yonai	67,811	40.90	59,130	35.83
Democratic Party For the People				15,785	9.56
Team Mirai				11,597	7.03
Sanseito	Taisei Sasaki	12,233	7.38	11,556	7.00
Japanese Communist Party	Kyoko Yoshida	10,448	6.30	9,361	5.67
Nippon Ishin no Kai				6,478	3.92
Reiwa Shinsengumi				5,938	3.60
Conservative Party of Japan				3,273	1.98
Social Democratic Party				2,954	1.79
Independent	Yuji Ogasawara	2,080	1.25		
Total		165,781	100.00	165,046	100.00
Invalid/blank votes					
Voter turnout			58.69		
Registered voters		285,158		285,158	
CRA hold					

Iwate 2nd district
Party	Candidate	Constituency		Proportional	
Party	Candidate	Votes	%	Votes	%
Liberal Democratic Party	Shun'ichi Suzuki	123,711	64.77	83,864	43.49
Centrist Reform Alliance				36,336	18.84
Democratic Party For the People	Makoto Sasaki	67,294	35.23	22,341	11.58
Sanseito				12,337	6.40
Team Mirai				9,548	4.95
Japanese Communist Party				8,230	4.27
Reiwa Shinsengumi				7,415	3.84
Nippon Ishin no Kai				6,775	3.51
Conservative Party of Japan				3,015	1.56
Social Democratic Party				2,996	1.55
Total		191,005	100.00	192,857	100.00
Invalid/blank votes					
Voter turnout			58.10		
Registered voters		340,058		340,058	
LDP hold					

Iwate 3rd district
Party	Candidate	Constituency		Proportional	
Party	Candidate	Votes	%	Votes	%
Liberal Democratic Party	Takashi Fujiwara	102,578	48.58	75,976	35.99
Centrist Reform Alliance	Ichirō Ozawa	78,731	37.29	51,158	24.23
Democratic Party For the People				18,392	8.71
Sanseito	Taisuke Oikawa	29,831	14.13	17,948	8.50
Team Mirai				11,936	5.65
Japanese Communist Party				9,911	4.69
Reiwa Shinsengumi				8,975	4.25
Nippon Ishin no Kai				8,033	3.80
Social Democratic Party				5,077	2.40
Conservative Party of Japan				3,720	1.76
Total		211,140	100.00	211,126	100.00
Invalid/blank votes					
Voter turnout			60.26		
Registered voters		358,351		358,351	
LDP gain from CRA					

=== Miyagi Prefecture ===
Miyagi Prefecture
Party	Constituency			Proportional	
Party	Votes	%	Seats	Votes	%
Liberal Democratic Party	557,598	53.70	5	407,292	39.09
Centrist Reform Alliance	308,466	29.71	0	227,663	21.85
Democratic Party For the People	23,237	2.24	0	86,489	8.30
Sanseito	99,684	9.60	0	84,169	8.08
Team Mirai				81,363	7.81
Nippon Ishin no Kai	25,640	2.47	0	50,301	4.83
Japanese Communist Party	19,245	1.85	0	41,769	4.01
Reiwa Shinsengumi				29,141	2.80
Conservative Party of Japan				22,041	2.12
Social Democratic Party				11,602	1.11
Independents	4,533	0.44	0		
Total	1,038,403	100.00	5	1,041,830	100.00
Invalid/blank votes					
Voter turnout					
Registered voters					

Miyagi 1st district
Party	Candidate	Constituency		Proportional	
Party	Candidate	Votes	%	Votes	%
Liberal Democratic Party	Tōru Doi	110,185	45.02	85,619	34.87
Centrist Reform Alliance	Akiko Okamoto	78,106	31.91	51,273	20.88
Team Mirai				25,463	10.37
Democratic Party For the People				22,099	9.00
Sanseito	Ayako Lawrence	31,664	12.94	20,683	8.42
Nippon Ishin no Kai	Koji Takahashi	15,246	6.23	13,586	5.53
Japanese Communist Party	Ren Nakajima	9,547	3.90	11,359	4.63
Reiwa Shinsengumi				6,326	2.58
Conservative Party of Japan				6,268	2.55
Social Democratic Party				2,891	1.18
Total		244,748	100.00	245,567	100.00
Invalid/blank votes					
Voter turnout			55.56		
Registered voters		447,641		447,641	
LDP gain from CRA					

Miyagi 2nd district
Party	Candidate	Constituency		Proportional	
Party	Candidate	Votes	%	Votes	%
Liberal Democratic Party	Katsuyuki Watanabe	101,364	41.41	89,498	36.47
Centrist Reform Alliance	Sayuri Kamata	73,695	30.11	50,105	20.42
Sanseito	Masamune Wada	36,086	14.74	21,153	8.62
Democratic Party For the People	Ririka Sato	23,237	9.49	24,234	9.87
Team Mirai				22,638	9.22
Nippon Ishin no Kai	Atsushi Hayasaka	10,394	4.25	13,527	5.51
Japanese Communist Party				9,536	3.89
Reiwa Shinsengumi				6,295	2.57
Conservative Party of Japan				5,833	2.38
Social Democratic Party				2,597	1.06
Total		244,776	100.00	245,416	100.00
Invalid/blank votes					
Voter turnout			54.96		
Registered voters		452,387		452,387	
LDP gain from CRA					

Miyagi 3rd district
Party	Candidate	Constituency		Proportional	
Party	Candidate	Votes	%	Votes	%
Liberal Democratic Party	Akihiro Nishimura	83,705	54.72	62,936	40.83
Centrist Reform Alliance	Tsuyoshi Yanagisawa	47,303	30.92	34,838	22.60
Sanseito	Moeko Hayashi	17,440	11.40	12,880	8.35
Democratic Party For the People				11,763	7.63
Team Mirai				9,993	6.48
Nippon Ishin no Kai				7,042	4.57
Japanese Communist Party				5,261	3.41
Reiwa Shinsengumi				4,725	3.06
Independent	Takashi Yuki	3,412	2.23		
Conservative Party of Japan				2,919	1.89
Social Democratic Party				1,803	1.17
Independent	Koji Asada	1,121	0.73		
Total		152,981	100.00	154,160	100.00
Invalid/blank votes					
Voter turnout			56.85		
Registered voters		275,158		275,158	
LDP gain from CRA					

Miyagi 4th district
Party	Candidate	Constituency		Proportional	
Party	Candidate	Votes	%	Votes	%
Liberal Democratic Party	Chisato Morishita	124,250	57.15	91,224	41.94
Centrist Reform Alliance	Jun Azumi	78,671	36.18	50,956	23.43
Sanseito	Makoto Sano	14,494	6.67	17,107	7.86
Democratic Party For the People				16,106	7.40
Team Mirai				13,167	6.05
Nippon Ishin no Kai				8,592	3.95
Japanese Communist Party				8,394	3.86
Reiwa Shinsengumi				6,156	2.83
Conservative Party of Japan				4,110	1.89
Social Democratic Party				1,696	0.78
Total		217,415	100.00	217,508	100.00
Invalid/blank votes					
Voter turnout			58.31		
Registered voters		378,328		378,328	
LDP gain from CRA					

Miyagi 5th district
Party	Candidate	Constituency		Proportional	
Party	Candidate	Votes	%	Votes	%
Liberal Democratic Party	Itsunori Onodera	138,094	77.37	78,015	43.54
Centrist Reform Alliance	Tsuneharu Sakai	30,691	17.20	40,491	22.60
Sanseito				12,346	6.89
Democratic Party For the People				12,287	6.86
Team Mirai				10,102	5.64
Nippon Ishin no Kai				7,554	4.22
Japanese Communist Party	Yutaka Yuki	9,698	5.43	7,219	4.03
Reiwa Shinsengumi				5,639	3.15
Conservative Party of Japan				2,911	1.62
Social Democratic Party				2,615	1.46
Total		178,483	100.00	179,179	100.00
Invalid/blank votes					
Voter turnout			55.13		
Registered voters		330,414		330,414	
LDP hold					

=== Akita Prefecture ===
Akita Prefecture
Party	Constituency			Proportional	
Party	Votes	%	Seats	Votes	%
Liberal Democratic Party	221,355	50.02	2	196,090	44.27
Centrist Reform Alliance	80,331	18.15	0	75,552	17.06
Democratic Party For the People	113,083	25.56	1	65,635	14.82
Nippon Ishin no Kai	14,843	3.35	0	24,424	5.51
Sanseito	7,645	1.73	0	23,402	5.28
Team Mirai				19,299	4.36
Japanese Communist Party	5,246	1.19	0	15,087	3.41
Reiwa Shinsengumi				10,592	2.39
Conservative Party of Japan				6,831	1.54
Social Democratic Party				5,982	1.35
Total	442,503	100.00	3	442,894	100.00
Invalid/blank votes					
Voter turnout					
Registered voters					

Akita 1st district
Party	Candidate	Constituency		Proportional	
Party	Candidate	Votes	%	Votes	%
Liberal Democratic Party	Hiroyuki Togashi	65,940	46.49	57,093	40.49
Democratic Party For the People	Sachiko Kimura	25,510	17.98	19,116	13.56
Centrist Reform Alliance	Shusaku Hayakawa	22,665	15.98	23,947	16.98
Nippon Ishin no Kai	Daigo Matsuura	14,843	10.46	11,233	7.97
Sanseito	Miwako Sato	7,645	5.39	8,177	5.80
Team Mirai				8,095	5.74
Japanese Communist Party	Satoshi Suzuki	5,246	3.70	5,842	4.14
Reiwa Shinsengumi				3,227	2.29
Conservative Party of Japan				2,491	1.77
Social Democratic Party				1,788	1.27
Total		141,849	100.00	141,009	100.00
Invalid/blank votes					
Voter turnout			56.82		
Registered voters		251,935		251,935	
LDP hold					

Akita 2nd district
Party	Candidate	Constituency		Proportional	
Party	Candidate	Votes	%	Votes	%
Liberal Democratic Party	Junji Fukuhara	70,352	54.95	58,910	46.07
Centrist Reform Alliance	Takashi Midorikawa	57,666	45.05	28,534	22.32
Democratic Party For the People				11,070	8.66
Sanseito				6,807	5.32
Nippon Ishin no Kai				6,009	4.70
Team Mirai				4,841	3.79
Japanese Communist Party				4,484	3.51
Reiwa Shinsengumi				3,346	2.62
Social Democratic Party				1,935	1.51
Conservative Party of Japan				1,928	1.51
Total		128,018	100.00	127,864	100.00
Invalid/blank votes					
Voter turnout			54.96		
Registered voters		237,813		237,813	
LDP gain from CRA					

Akita 3rd district
Party	Candidate	Constituency		Proportional	
Party	Candidate	Votes	%	Votes	%
Democratic Party For the People	Toshihide Muraoka	87,573	50.73	35,449	20.37
Liberal Democratic Party	Nobuhide Minorikawa	85,063	49.27	80,087	46.02
Centrist Reform Alliance				23,071	13.26
Sanseito				8,418	4.84
Nippon Ishin no Kai				7,182	4.13
Team Mirai				6,363	3.66
Japanese Communist Party				4,761	2.74
Reiwa Shinsengumi				4,019	2.31
Conservative Party of Japan				2,412	1.39
Social Democratic Party				2,259	1.30
Total		172,636	100.00	174,021	100.00
Invalid/blank votes					
Voter turnout			59.78		
Registered voters		297,079		297,079	
DPFP hold					

=== Yamagata Prefecture ===
Yamagata Prefecture
Party	Constituency			Proportional	
Party	Votes	%	Seats	Votes	%
Liberal Democratic Party	321,305	62.84	3	219,233	42.91
Centrist Reform Alliance	80,875	15.82	0	85,374	16.71
Democratic Party For the People	71,776	14.04	0	71,453	13.99
Sanseito	29,462	5.76	0	33,992	6.65
Team Mirai				29,256	5.73
Nippon Ishin no Kai				19,816	3.88
Reiwa Shinsengumi				17,856	3.49
Japanese Communist Party	7,919	1.55	0	17,177	3.36
Conservative Party of Japan				9,590	1.88
Social Democratic Party				7,169	1.40
Total	511,337	100.00	3	510,916	100.00
Invalid/blank votes					
Voter turnout					
Registered voters					

Yamagata 1st district
Party	Candidate	Constituency		Proportional	
Party	Candidate	Votes	%	Votes	%
Liberal Democratic Party	Hiroaki Endo	106,063	61.24	72,612	41.73
Centrist Reform Alliance	Masahiro Harada	48,443	27.97	31,533	18.12
Democratic Party For the People				20,898	12.01
Sanseito	Kyoko Sakurada	18,692	10.79	12,692	7.29
Team Mirai				11,744	6.75
Nippon Ishin no Kai				7,312	4.20
Reiwa Shinsengumi				5,855	3.36
Japanese Communist Party				5,205	2.99
Conservative Party of Japan				3,655	2.10
Social Democratic Party				2,508	1.44
Total		173,198	100.00	174,014	100.00
Invalid/blank votes					
Voter turnout			60.44		
Registered voters		292,635		292,635	
LDP hold					

Yamagata 2nd district
Party	Candidate	Constituency		Proportional	
Party	Candidate	Votes	%	Votes	%
Liberal Democratic Party	Norikazu Suzuki	124,512	68.32	80,723	44.45
Democratic Party For the People	Daijiro Kikuchi	49,804	27.33	31,201	17.18
Centrist Reform Alliance				25,919	14.27
Sanseito				10,946	6.03
Team Mirai				8,833	4.86
Reiwa Shinsengumi				6,514	3.59
Nippon Ishin no Kai				6,452	3.55
Japanese Communist Party	Koji Iwamoto	7,919	4.35	5,649	3.11
Conservative Party of Japan				2,996	1.65
Social Democratic Party				2,373	1.31
Total		182,235	100.00	181,606	100.00
Invalid/blank votes					
Voter turnout			62.70		
Registered voters		295,205		295,205	
LDP hold					

Yamagata 3rd district
Party	Candidate	Constituency		Proportional	
Party	Candidate	Votes	%	Votes	%
Liberal Democratic Party	Ayuko Kato	90,730	58.20	65,898	42.43
Centrist Reform Alliance	Takuma Ochiai	32,432	20.80	27,922	17.98
Democratic Party For the People	Kosuke Kita	21,972	14.09	19,354	12.46
Sanseito	Kazushi Endo	10,770	6.91	10,354	6.67
Team Mirai				8,679	5.59
Japanese Communist Party				6,323	4.07
Nippon Ishin no Kai				6,052	3.90
Reiwa Shinsengumi				5,487	3.53
Conservative Party of Japan				2,939	1.89
Social Democratic Party				2,288	1.47
Total		155,904	100.00	155,296	100.00
Invalid/blank votes					
Voter turnout			59.03		
Registered voters		268,713		268,713	
LDP hold					

=== Fukushima Prefecture ===
Fukushima Prefecture
Party	Constituency			Proportional	
Party	Votes	%	Seats	Votes	%
Liberal Democratic Party	436,923	50.75	4	363,481	42.34
Centrist Reform Alliance	315,300	36.62	0	202,779	23.56
Democratic Party For the People	38,539	4.48	0	67,551	7.85
Sanseito	20,645	2.40	0	62,565	7.27
Team Mirai				46,009	5.35
Japanese Communist Party	16,649	1.93	0	35,355	4.11
Nippon Ishin no Kai				31,672	3.68
Reiwa Shinsengumi				24,429	2.84
Conservative Party of Japan				14,253	1.66
Social Democratic Party				12,610	1.47
Total	860,933	100.00	4	860,704	100.00
Invalid/blank votes					
Voter turnout					
Registered voters					

Fukushima 1st district
Party	Candidate	Constituency		Proportional	
Party	Candidate	Votes	%	Votes	%
Liberal Democratic Party	Naotoshi Nishiyama	99,531	45.24	91,614	41.59
Centrist Reform Alliance	Emi Kaneko	93,471	42.48	52,871	24.00
Independent	Yoshikazu Kameoka	27,013	12.28		
Democratic Party For the People				15,523	7.05
Sanseito				15,172	6.89
Team Mirai				12,665	5.75
Japanese Communist Party				11,082	5.03
Nippon Ishin no Kai				8,503	3.86
Reiwa Shinsengumi				5,964	2.71
Conservative Party of Japan				3,555	1.61
Social Democratic Party				3,344	1.52
Total		220,015	100.00	220,293	100.00
Invalid/blank votes					
Voter turnout			59.97		
Registered voters		374,297		374,297	
LDP gain from CRA					

Fukushima 2nd district
Party	Candidate	Constituency		Proportional	
Party	Candidate	Votes	%	Votes	%
Liberal Democratic Party	Taku Nemoto	128,948	52.01	107,038	43.49
Centrist Reform Alliance	Kōichirō Genba	90,146	36.36	57,146	23.22
Sanseito	Risako Oyama	20,645	8.33	20,167	8.19
Democratic Party For the People				18,075	7.34
Team Mirai				12,670	5.15
Nippon Ishin no Kai				8,892	3.61
Japanese Communist Party	Yumiko Marumoto	6,395	2.58	8,200	3.33
Reiwa Shinsengumi				6,596	2.68
Conservative Party of Japan				4,030	1.64
Social Democratic Party				3,282	1.33
Independent	Yudai Endo	1,780	0.72		
Total		247,914	100.00	246,096	100.00
Invalid/blank votes					
Voter turnout			60.02		
Registered voters		417,742		417,742	
LDP gain from CRA					

Fukushima 3rd district
Party	Candidate	Constituency		Proportional	
Party	Candidate	Votes	%	Votes	%
Liberal Democratic Party	Kentaro Uesugi	107,649	57.03	80,805	42.60
Centrist Reform Alliance	Shinji Oguma	77,011	40.80	45,652	24.07
Democratic Party For the People				14,028	7.40
Sanseito				13,396	7.06
Team Mirai				9,687	5.11
Nippon Ishin no Kai				7,063	3.72
Japanese Communist Party				6,872	3.62
Reiwa Shinsengumi				5,987	3.16
Independent	Jinshan Tun	4,084	2.16		
Social Democratic Party				3,298	1.74
Conservative Party of Japan				2,904	1.53
Total		188,744	100.00	189,692	100.00
Invalid/blank votes					
Voter turnout			61.03		
Registered voters		317,696		317,696	
LDP gain from CRA					

Fukushima 4th district
Party	Candidate	Constituency		Proportional	
Party	Candidate	Votes	%	Votes	%
Liberal Democratic Party	Ryutaro Sakamoto	100,795	49.35	84,024	41.06
Centrist Reform Alliance	Yuki Saito	54,672	26.77	47,110	23.02
Democratic Party For the People	Yota Yamaguchi	38,539	18.87	19,925	9.74
Sanseito				13,830	6.76
Team Mirai				10,987	5.37
Japanese Communist Party	Satoshi Kumagai	10,254	5.02	9,201	4.50
Nippon Ishin no Kai				7,214	3.53
Reiwa Shinsengumi				5,882	2.87
Conservative Party of Japan				3,764	1.84
Social Democratic Party				2,686	1.31
Total		204,260	100.00	204,623	100.00
Invalid/blank votes					
Voter turnout			53.44		
Registered voters		389,236		389,236	
LDP hold					

== Proportional representation ==
Proportional representation results
Party	Votes	Seats	Rank	Elected member	Constituency	Ratio
LDP	1,612,576 (41.2%)	6	1	Akinori Eto		
LDP	1,612,576 (41.2%)	6	2	Nobuhide Minorikawa	Akita 3rd	97.1%
LDP	1,612,576 (41.2%)	6	2	Hiromasa Yonai	Iwate 1st	92.6%
LDP	1,612,576 (41.2%)	6	23	Shintaro Ito		
LDP	1,612,576 (41.2%)	6	24	Ichirō Kanke		
LDP	1,612,576 (41.2%)	6	25	Kenya Akiba		
CRA	828,883 (21.2%)	3	1	Ken'ichi Shoji		
CRA	828,883 (21.2%)	3	2	Yoshifu Arita		
CRA	828,883 (21.2%)	3	3	Emi Kaneko	Fukushima 1st	93.9%
DPFP	389,503 (9.9%)	1	1	Makoto Sasaki	Iwate 2nd	54.3%
Sansei	278,410 (7.1%)	1	1	Masamune Wada	Miyagi 2nd	35.6%
Mirai	234,050 (6.0%)	1	1	Takumi Hayashi		

Liberal Democratic Party 1,612,576 (41.16%) 6 seats
Rank	Candidate	Constituency	Ratio
1	Akinori Eto		
2	Jun Tsushima	Aomori 1st	Won
2	Junichi Kanda	Aomori 2nd	Won
2	Jiro Kimura	Aomori 3rd	Won
2	Shun'ichi Suzuki	Iwate 2nd	Won
2	Takashi Fujiwara	Iwate 3rd	Won
2	Tōru Doi	Miyagi 1st	Won
2	Katsuyuki Watanabe	Miyagi 2nd	Won
2	Akihiro Nishimura	Miyagi 3rd	Won
2	Chisato Morishita	Miyagi 4th	Won
2	Itsunori Onodera	Miyagi 5th	Won
2	Hiroyuki Togashi	Akita 1st	Won
2	Junji Fukuhara	Akita 2nd	Won
2	Hiroaki Endo	Yamagata 1st	Won
2	Norikazu Suzuki	Yamagata 2nd	Won
2	Ayuko Kato	Yamagata 3rd	Won
2	Naotoshi Nishiyama	Fukushima 1st	Won
2	Taku Nemoto	Fukushima 2nd	Won
2	Kentaro Uesugi	Fukushima 3rd	Won
2	Ryutaro Sakamoto	Fukushima 4th	Won
2	Nobuhide Minorikawa	Akita 3rd	97.1
2	Hiromasa Yonai	Iwate 1st	92.6
23	Shintaro Ito		
24	Ichirō Kanke		
25	Kenya Akiba		
26	Jiro Aichi		

Centrist Reform Alliance 828,883 (21.16%) 3 seats
Rank	Candidate	Constituency	Ratio
1	Ken'ichi Shoji		
2	Yoshifu Arita		
3	Takeshi Shina	Iwate 1st	Won
3	Emi Kaneko	Fukushima 1st	93.9
3	Takashi Midorikawa	Akita 2nd	82.0
3	Hanako Okada	Aomori 3rd	80.9
3	Ichirō Ozawa	Iwate 3rd	76.8
3	Sayuri Kamata	Miyagi 2nd	72.7
3	Shinji Oguma	Fukushima 3rd	71.5
3	Akiko Okamoto	Miyagi 1st	70.9
3	Koichiro Genba	Fukushima 2nd	69.9
3	Sekio Masuta	Aomori 1st	64.1
3	Jun Azumi	Miyagi 4th	63.3
3	Tsuyoshi Yanagisawa	Miyagi 3rd	56.5
3	Yuki Saito	Fukushima 4th	54.2
3	Kazuhiko Matsuo	Aomori 2nd	48.8
3	Masahiro Harada	Yamagata 1st	45.7
3	Takuma Ochiai	Yamagata 3rd	35.7
3	Shusaku Hayakawa	Akita 1st	34.4
3	Tsuneharu Sakai	Miyagi 5th	22.2

Democratic Party For the People 389,503 (9.94%) 1 seat
Rank	Candidate	Constituency	Ratio
1	Toshihide Muraoka	Akita 3rd	Won
1	Makoto Sasaki	Iwate 2nd	54.3
1	Daijiro Kikuchi	Yamagata 2nd	40.0
1	Sachiko Kimura	Akita 1st	38.7
1	Yota Yamaguchi	Fukushima 4th	38.2
1	Akira Kanehama	Aomori 2nd	28.7
1	Kōsuke Kita	Yamagata 3rd	24.2
1	~~Ririka Sato~~ (Note: Ineligible for election - failed to surpass the required 10% of votes in their single-member constituency race.)	Miyagi 2nd	22.9

Sanseito 278,410 (7.11%) 1 seat
Rank	Candidate	Constituency	Ratio
1	Masamune Wada	Miyagi 2nd	35.6
2	Ayako Lawrence	Miyagi 1st	28.7
3	~~Risako Oyama~~	Fukushima 2nd	16.0

Team Mirai 234,050 (5.97%) 1 seat
Rank	Candidate	Constituency	Ratio
1	Takumi Hayashi		

Nippon Ishin no Kai 165,104 (4.21%) 0 seats
Rank	Candidate	Constituency	Ratio
1	Daigo Matsuura	Akita 1st	22.5
1	~~Kōji Takahashi~~	Miyagi 1st	13.8
1	~~Atsushi Hayasaka~~	Miyagi 2nd	10.3

Japanese Communist Party 158,466 (4.05%) 0 seats
Rank	Candidate	Constituency	Ratio
1	Chizuko Takahashi		
2	~~Kyoko Yoshida~~	Iwate 1st	14.3

Reiwa Shinsengumi 121,631 (3.10%) 0 seats
Rank	Candidate	Constituency	Ratio
1	~~Wakako Sawara~~	Aomori 3rd	10.3
2	Toma Nitobe		

Conservative Party of Japan 72,889 (1.86%) 0 seats
Rank	Candidate	Constituency	Ratio
1	Rinpei Kozawa		

Social Democratic Party 55,999 (1.43%) 0 seats
Rank	Candidate	Constituency	Ratio
1	Yoshitaka Endo		
