= Minorikawa =

Minorikawa may refer to:

- Gaku Minorikawa (御法川学), Japanese ingeneer and businessman
- Hidefumi Minorikawa (御法川英文) (1936–2003), Japanese politician
- Masao Minorikawa (御法川正男) (1912/13-2005), Japanese businessman
- Nobuhide Minorikawa (御法川 信英) (born 1964), Japanese politician
- Naosaburō Minorikawa (御法川直三郎) (1856–1930), Japanese inventor in silk industry
- Norio Minorikawa (御法川 法男) (1944–2025), Japanese television presenter
- Osamu Minorikawa (御法川修) (born 1972), Japanese film director
