= Hirodai =

Hirodai may refer to:

- Hirosaki University
- Hiroshima University
