= Koichi Kato (politician, born 1939) =

Japanese politician (1939–2016)

- 加藤 紘一
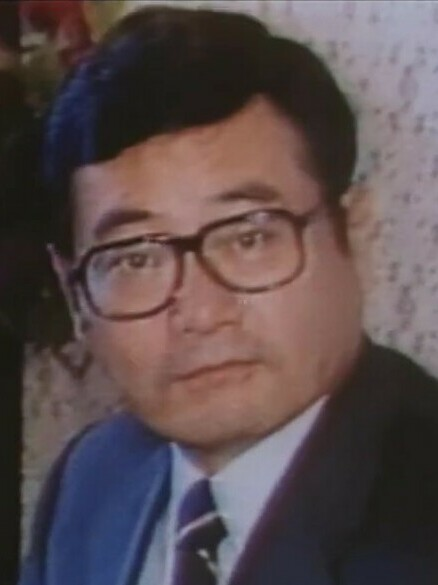
- Kato in 1985

Secretary-General of the Liberal Democratic Party
- In office October 1995 – July 1998
- President: Ryutaro Hashimoto
- Preceded by: Hiroshi Mitsuzuka
- Succeeded by: Yoshirō Mori

Chief Cabinet Secretary
- In office 5 November 1991 – 12 December 1992
- Prime Minister: Kiichi Miyazawa
- Preceded by: Misoji Sakamoto
- Succeeded by: Yōhei Kōno

Director-General of the Japan Defense Agency
- In office 1 November 1984 – 22 July 1986
- Prime Minister: Yasuhiro Nakasone
- Preceded by: Kurihara Yoshiyuki
- Succeeded by: Kurihara Yoshiyuki

Deputy Chief Cabinet Secretary (Political affairs)
- In office 8 December 1978 – 17 July 1980
- Prime Minister: Masayoshi Ōhira
- Preceded by: Yoshirō Mori
- Succeeded by: Riki Kawara

Member of the House of Representatives
- In office 10 November 2003 – 16 November 2012
- Preceded by: Riichiro Chikaoka
- Succeeded by: Juichi Abe
- Constituency: Yamagata 3rd
- In office 10 December 1972 – 9 April 2002
- Preceded by: Masanosuke Ikeda
- Succeeded by: Jun Saito
- Constituency: Yamagata 2nd (1972–1996); Yamagata 4th (1996–2002)

Personal details
- Born: 17 June 1939 Tsuruoka, Yamagata, Japan
- Died: 9 September 2016 (aged 77) Tokyo, Japan
- Party: Liberal Democratic
- Children: 3, including Ayuko
- Education: University of Tokyo; Harvard University

Koichi Kato (加藤 紘一, Katō Kōichi; 17 June 1939 – 9 September 2016) was a Japanese politician of the Liberal Democratic Party who held a seat in the House of Representatives in the National Diet for 13 terms between 1972 and 2012. Kato was elected to several districts in Yamagata Prefecture and served as the Director-General of the Japan Defense Agency from 1984 to 1986 and Chief Cabinet Secretary from 1991 to 1992. Kato was a leading member of the Kōchikai faction of the LDP aligned with Prime Ministers Masayoshi Ōhira, Zenkō Suzuki, and Kiichi Miyazawa. Kato lost his seat at the December 2012 general election, and his daughter Ayuko Kato was elected to the seat at the 2014 general election.

== Early life ==
Kato was born on 17 June 1939 in Higashi Ward, Nagoya, and raised in Tsuruoka, Yamagata Prefecture. His father, Seizo Kato, was a politician who served as mayor of Tsuruoka from 1946 before being elected to the House of Representatives in 1952, serving for five terms until 1965. After graduating from the University of Tokyo, Kato joined the Foreign Ministry in 1963, which led to stints at the Japanese embassies in Taipei and Washington, D.C. In 1967, he completed a Master's degree at Harvard University. After continuing his foreign service career in Hong Kong he returned to Japan as an aide in the China Affairs Bureau of the Foreign Ministry. His experience in foreign affairs resulted in fluent English and Chinese, and he remained deeply interested in relations with China.

== Political career ==
Kato was first elected to the National Diet in 1972 as a member of the Liberal Democratic Party (LDP), representing his native Yamagata and representing that area continuously until 2012, except for 19 months following his resignation due to a scandal in April 2002. Kato was aligned with the Kōchikai (then called Ōhira) faction of the LDP, which produced three Japanese Prime Ministers: Masayoshi Ōhira, Zenkō Suzuki, and Kiichi Miyazawa. The power of this faction provided Kato ample opportunity for promotion, and he served in several Cabinet Positions through the 1980s and early 1990s. From 1984 to 1986, he was Director General of the Japan Defense Agency. In 1992, he was elected Secretary-General of the LDP, a time when the traditional dominance of the party was being challenged.

=== YKK and the 2000 leadership challenge ===
Always seen as something of a maverick, Kato formed a relationship with two other young LDP reformers, Taku Yamasaki and Junichiro Koizumi, during the Kaifu administration. The three together became known as "YKK" after the initials of their last names. Originally, the trio had agreed to sway their factions towards the new generation of LDP leaders and marginalize the old guard within the Diet. With the election of Miyazawa (then leader of Kato's own faction) in 1991, YKK gained greater prestige and power within the party. From the Miyazawa era onwards, YKK represented the power base of the anti-mainstream faction in the LDP. All three leaders made repeated tilts at the party leadership in the 1990s, but were unsuccessful. In 1998, Kato assumed leadership of the Kochikai faction, taking over from Miyazawa.

In May 2000, upon the sudden illness and death of Prime Minister Keizō Obuchi, Kato did not make a challenge for leadership of the LDP, believing that internal strife would not be healthy for a party in mourning. By November, however, displeased with the slow pace of reform and poor public image of the Mori administration, Kato made his move. After consulting with the opposition parties, Kato realized that with the support of his and Yamasaki's factions, a vote of no-confidence against Mori would pass in the Diet. Initial public reaction to Kato's announcement of this vote was good, with Mori's approval ratings diving to 30%. Unfortunately for Kato, the LDP Secretary-General at this time, Hiromu Nonaka, was a strong supporter of Mori. Nonaka launched a harsh round of party discipline, threatening to expel any LDP members who voted against Mori, and his threats had the desired effect: Kato's support dried up even within his own faction. Kato and his remaining supporters abstained from the no-confidence vote as a face-saving measure, knowing that he could not win. However, the damage had been done, with Kato and Yamasaki left to bear the full brunt of public humiliation. The aftermath of Kato's rebellion was disastrous as a large segment of his faction split off, weakening his influence in the Diet. Public opinion that had initially supported ousting Mori now blamed Kato for his failure. The opposition parties were frustrated with his unwillingness to break from the LDP. Both Kato and Yamasaki had been considered candidates for Prime Minister, but with the loss of prestige resulting from the Mori affair, they had lost their chance. With Nonaka's resignation shortly after Kato's rebellion, the path was clear for someone to replace Mori. Junichiro Koizumi, the only member of YKK undamaged by the events of November 2001, finally gained control of the LDP. While Kato and Yamasaki had failed, the reformist, anti-mainstream ideals of YKK had finally moved to the forefront of Japanese politics, providing validation for Kato and his views.

=== Kato and Ichirō Ozawa ===
Kato had a sometimes difficult relationship with fellow LDP reformer Ichirō Ozawa, a strong advocate for reform within the mainstream Tanaka/Takeshita faction. In 1993, Ozawa chose to split from the party and form the Japan Renewal Party, rather than continue within the LDP. This was seen as a serious betrayal by many, including Kato. When Kato was in a similar position in 2000, he chose party loyalty, although his chances of considerable influence in the opposition had he crossed over. When the LDP was considering a merger with Ozawa's Liberal Party in the late 90s, Kato was strongly opposed to bringing Ozawa back to the LDP fold. Kato and Ozawa are often portrayed as archenemies, despite their very similar views on economic and political reform (in foreign policy, Kato is somewhat less hawkish than Ozawa, advocating a more cautious international role for Japan).

=== Scandals ===
Kato was involved in several scandals in Japanese politics during his political career. He was implicated in the Recruit scandal in the late 1980s, tarnishing his reputation for several years. In 2002, he was the centre of a major scandal involving tax evasion, bribery, and misuse of political funds. His secretary, Saburo Sato, had been charging a "Kato Consumption Tax" to companies wanting access to Kato while seeking public contracts. Sato had also failed to declare ¥100 million in taxes. While Kato denied any knowledge of the affair, few believed that such widespread corruption could have occurred in his office without his approval. It was later revealed that he had been using funds earmarked for political use to pay the rent on his Tokyo apartment. Faced with this evidence, he soon acquiesced to demands for his resignation. In November 2003, Kato made his return to the Diet as an independent, having retreated from politics long enough for the scandal to die down, and rejoined the LDP as a high-ranking member.

=== House fire ===
On 15 August 2006, Kato's adjoining house and office in Tsuruoka burned to the ground on the 61st anniversary of the surrender of Japan in World War II. The attack was confirmed as arson and the lead suspect was expected to be charged sometime in September 2006 . Reportedly, the suspect was affiliated with a far-right organization and set fire to Kato's house for making remarks critical of then-Prime Minister Junichiro Koizumi visiting the Yasukuni Shrine.

=== Retirement ===
Kato retired from political office after losing his seat for Yamagata 3rd district at the December 2012 general election to Juichi Abe, an independent and mayor of Sakata.

== Death ==
Kato died from pneumonia at a hospital in Tokyo on 9 September 2016.

Political offices
Preceded by Misoji Sakamoto	Chief Cabinet Secretary of Japan; 1991–1992	Succeeded by Yōhei Kōno
Party political offices
Preceded by Kiichi Miyazawa	Head of Kōchikai faction 1998–2001	Succeeded by Mitsuo Horiuchi
