= Michihiko Kano =

Japanese politician (1942–2021)

- 鹿野 道彦
- Official portrait, 2010

Minister of Agriculture, Forestry and Fisheries
- In office 17 September 2010 – 4 June 2012
- Prime Minister: Naoto Kan; Yoshihiko Noda
- Preceded by: Masahiko Yamada
- Succeeded by: Akira Gunji
- In office 10 August 1989 – 28 February 1990
- Prime Minister: Toshiki Kaifu
- Preceded by: Hisao Horinouchi
- Succeeded by: Tomio Yamamoto

Director-General of the Management and Coordination Agency
- In office 12 December 1992 – 9 August 1993
- Prime Minister: Kiichi Miyazawa
- Preceded by: Junzō Iwasaki
- Succeeded by: Kōshirō Ishida

Member of the House of Representatives
- In office 31 August 2009 – 16 November 2012
- Preceded by: Toshiaki Endō
- Succeeded by: Toshiaki Endō
- Constituency: Yamagata 1st
- In office 11 December 1976 – 8 August 2005
- Preceded by: Yasumi Kurogane
- Succeeded by: Multi-member district
- Constituency: Former Yamagata 1st (1976–1996); Yamagata 1st (1996–2003); Tohoku PR (2003–2005)

Personal details
- Born: 24 January 1942 Yamagata, Japan
- Died: 21 October 2021 (aged 79) Yamagata, Japan
- Party: Democratic
- Other political affiliations: LDP (1976–1994); NFP (1994–1998); GGP (1998); Independent (2002–2003)
- Parent: Hikokichi Kano (father)
- Education: Gakushuin University

Michihiko Kano (鹿野道彦, Kano Michihiko; 24 January 1942 – 21 October 2021) was a Japanese politician of the Democratic Party of Japan who served as the Minister of Agriculture, Forestry and Fisheries twice.

He lost his seat in the 16 December 2012 general election.

Kano was born in Yamagata. He graduated from Gakushuin University.

After period of illness, Michihiko Kano died on 21 October 2021 in a hospital in Yamagata City; he was 79.

== Election history ==
Election	Age	District	Political party	Number of votes	election results
1976 Japanese general election	34	Yamagata 1st district	LDP	60,199	winning
1979 Japanese general election	37	Yamagata 1st district	LDP	79,694	winning
1980 Japanese general election	38	Yamagata 1st district	LDP	86,210	winning
1983 Japanese general election	41	Yamagata 1st district	LDP	76,668	winning
1986 Japanese general election	44	Yamagata 1st district	LDP	94,320	winning
1990 Japanese general election	48	Yamagata 1st district	LDP	97,277	winning
1993 Japanese general election	51	Yamagata 1st district	LDP	103,559	winning
1996 Japanese general election	54	Yamagata 1st district	NFP	81,047	winning
2000 Japanese general election	58	Yamagata 1st district	DPJ	90,349	winning
2003 Japanese general election	61	Yamagata 1st district	DPJ	81,580	elected by PR
2005 Japanese general election	63	Yamagata 1st district	DPJ	86,755	lost
2009 Japanese general election	67	Yamagata 1st district	DPJ	106,202	winning
2012 Japanese general election	70	Yamagata 1st district	DPJ	70,411	lost
2013 Japanese House of Councillors election	74	proportional representation block	DPJ	ーー	lost
