= Yamagata 4th district =

Former Japan House of Representatives constituency

Yamagata 4th District
- Former Parliamentary constituency for the Japanese House of Representatives
- Prefecture: Yamagata
- Proportional District: Tohoku

Former constituency
- Created: 1994
- Abolished: 2002
- Seats: One
- Replaced by: Yamagata 3rd (Merged into)

Yamagata 4th district (山形県第4区, Yamagata-ken dai-yonku or simply 山形4区, Yamagata-yonku) was a single-member constituency of the House of Representatives in the national Diet of Japan located in Yamagata Prefecture.

== Areas covered ==
- Sakata
- Tsuruoka
- Akumi District
- Higashitagawa District
- Nishitagawa District

== List of representatives ==
Election	Representative	Party	Notes
1996	Koichi Kato	Liberal Democratic	Kato resigned from the House of Representatives after his secretary was arrested for tax evasion.
2000	Koichi Kato	Liberal Democratic	Kato resigned from the House of Representatives after his secretary was arrested for tax evasion.
Vacant (April 2002–October 2002)
2002 by-el	Jun Saito	Democratic	

== Election results ==
2002 by-election
Party	Candidate	Votes	%	±%
Democratic	Jun Saito	51,437	48.45	
Independent	Takayoshi Sagae (endorsed by Liberal Democratic)	33,858	31.89	New
Communist	Miyako Sudo	20,877	19.66	
Turnout				
Democratic gain from LDP				

2000
Party	Candidate	Votes	%	±%
Liberal Democratic	Koichi Kato (incumbent)	131,181	72.14	
Democratic	Takayoshi Sagae	36,086	19.84	New
Communist	Masayoshi Sato	14,584	8.02	
Turnout				
LDP hold				

1996
Party	Candidate	Votes	%	±%
Liberal Democratic	Koichi Kato	112,033	65.77	New
New Frontier	Takayoshi Sagae	38,139	22.39	New
Communist	Shinji Sato	20,171	11.84	New
Turnout				
