= Junji Fukuhara =

Japanese politician

- 福原 淳嗣
- Official portrait, 2026

Member of the House of Representatives
- Incumbent
- Assumed office 28 October 2024
- Preceded by: Multi-member district
- Constituency: Tohoku PR (2024–2026); Akita 2nd (2026–present)

Mayor of Ōdate
- In office 1 May 2015 – 31 August 2024
- Preceded by: Hajime Obata
- Succeeded by: Kensuke Ishida

Member of the Ōdate City Council
- In office 1 May 1995 – 2003

Personal details
- Born: 18 December 1967 (age 58) Ōdate, Akita, Japan
- Party: Liberal Democratic
- Education: Keio University
- Website: Junji Fukuhara website

Junji Fukuhara (福原 淳嗣, Fukuhara Junji; born 18 December 1967) is a Japanese politician of the Liberal Democratic Party, who serves as a member of the House of Representatives.

== Early years ==
On 18 December 1967, Fukuhara was born in Ōdate, Akita Prefecture. He graduated from the Keio University's Faculty of Law.

== Political career ==
In 1995, Fukuhara ran for the Ōdate City Council and won. He had served the office until 2003.

In May 2003, he became the public secretary to House of Representatives member Hosei Norota, and in September 2008, he was promoted to Norota's policy secretary. In August 2009, he assumed the role of policy secretary for House of Representatives member Katsutoshi Kaneda.

On 24 April 2011, Fukuhara ran for the mayor of Ōdate but lost to incumbent Hajime Obata, endorsed by the LDP.

On 26 April 2015, Fukuhara ran for the mayor again and defeated Obata.

On 21 April 2019, Fukuhara was re-elected and secured his second-term.

On 23 April 2023, Fukuhara was re-elected and secured his third-term.

On 7 October 2023, the LDP Akita Federation nominated Fukuhara as Kaneda's successor after Kaneda announced his retirement.

On 12 July 2024, Fukuhara tell the chairman of the city council that he would resign on 31 August 2024.

In the 2024 general election, Fukuhara lost to CDP incumbent Takashi Midorikawa after a close race but won a seat in the PR.

In the 2026 general election, Fukuhara defeated CRA incumbent Midorikawa.

== Scandal ==
=== Allegations of Public Offices Election Act Violations ===
In the general election held in October 2024, a campaign worker in their 60s from the Fukuhara camp was referred to prosecutors on suspicion of violating the Public Offices Election Act (bribery) for allegedly paying campaign car staff compensation exceeding the legal limit. In response to inquiries, Fukuhara commented: "This is deeply regrettable and inexcusable. I have urged those involved to reflect deeply on their actions, and I will ensure that thorough measures are taken to prevent any recurrence."

On 11 April 2025, the Akita Department Prosecutors announced that it had summarily indicted three individuals, including the former secretary-general of the Fukuhara camp, as of March 26. They were charged with violations of the Public Offices Election Act regarding both bribery and the acceptance of bribes.
