= Chizuko Takahashi =

Japanese politician

- 高橋 千鶴子
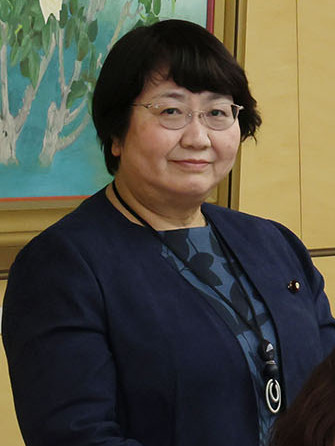
- Takahashi in 2022, at Naikaku Sōri Daijin Kantei

Member of the House of Representatives
- In office 9 November 2003 – 9 October 2024
- Preceded by: Zenmei Matsumoto
- Succeeded by: Wakako Sawara
- Constituency: Tohoku PR

Member of the Aomori Prefectural Assembly
- In office 30 April 1999 – 29 April 2003
- Constituency: Aomori City

Personal details
- Born: 16 September 1959 (age 67) Noshiro, Akita, Japan
- Party: Communist
- Education: Hirosaki University
- Website: chiduko.gr.jp

Chizuko Takahashi (高橋 千鶴子, Takahashi Chizuko; born 16 September 1959) is a Japanese politician and a former member of House of Representatives. She is a member of the Japanese Communist Party.

== Early life ==
Takahashi was born on 16 September 1959, in Noshiro, Akita Prefecture. She has one elder sister. During her early days, Takahashi's father was training to become sushi cook and was away from home. Her mother took care of the daughters while distributing newspapers. When Takahashi entered elementary school, she and her family moved to Kosaka, opening the only sushi restaurant in the town. After graduating Hirosaki University, she became a high school teacher in Aomori.

== Political career ==
Takahashi joined the Japanese Communist Party in 1983. Starting with the House of Councillors by-election in 1991, she unsuccessfully ran for national elections six times. In 1999, Takahashi was elected to Aomori Prefectural Assembly. In 2003 Japanese general election, she was elected from Tohoku proportional representation block. She was reelected in 2005 and 2009.

In 2012 general election, Takahashi received an endorsement from JA Group Aomori, which consists of Japan Agricultural Cooperatives in Aomori Prefecture. This was the first time that the JA endorsed a candidate from the Communist Party. Takahashi and JA signed a policy agreement confirming the firm opposition to Japan entering Trans-Pacific Partnership negotiations. She was reelected in this election.

After completing 7 terms, she ran unsuccessfully in 2024 general election. This was the first time the Communist Party failed to secure a seat in Tohoku proportional representation block.

In December 2024, the Communist Party announced that Takahashi will run in Tohoku proportional representation block for the next general election.
