= Vision of Reform =

Former Japanese political party

Vision of Reform 改革結集の会
- Leader: Toshihide Muraoka
- President: Sakihito Ozawa
- Chairman: Shinji Oguma
- Founder: Sakihito Ozawa
- Founded: 21 December 2015
- Dissolved: 25 March 2016
- Split from: Japan Innovation Party
- Merged into: Democratic Party
- Political position: Centre-right
- Colors: Blue

Website
- vision-of-reform.jp

Vision of Reform (改革結集の会, Kaikaku Kesshū no Kai; "Reform Assembly") was a Japanese political party formed in November 2015 by former environment minister Sakihito Ozawa following the split in the Japan Innovation Party. The party dissolved in March 2016, with 4 of the 5 members joining the Democratic Party.

== History ==
The Japan Innovation Party suffered a major split between August and October 2015, resulting in one of the party's founders, Tōru Hashimoto, to lead Osaka-based members in forming the Initiatives from Osaka party. Following the split, several of the remaining members of the Innovation Party expressed their intention to also leave the party due to dissatisfaction with Yorihisa Matsuno's leadership. Four of the members, Sakihito Ozawa, Shinji Oguma, Kazuhito Shigetoku and Toshihide Muraoka submitted their resignation from the party on 22 October 2015. Together with Taro Yamada, the President of The Assembly to Energize Japan, the group submitted an application to register a new party named the Sōmō no Kai (草莽の会; lit. commoners' party) on 18 November 2015. Yamada eventually chose not to leave the Assembly to Energize Japan. However, on 14 December Yoshihiro Suzuki, who had been sitting as an independent following his resignation from the Innovation Party, agreed to join the group. Having met the required 5-member minimum for registration as a party, the Vision of Reform was registered on 21 December 2015.

The members of the party were invited to participate in the merger of the Democratic Party of Japan (DPJ) and Japan Innovation Party in March 2016. Following a meeting with DPJ leader Yukio Edano on 22 March, Muraoka announced that four of the party's five members would participate in the merger. The party submitted their formal dissolution papers to the House of Representatives on 25 March 2016. Muraoka, Oguma, Shigetoku and Suzuki joined the formation of the Democratic Party that resulted from the DPJ-Innovation Party merger on 27 March 2016, while Ozawa indicated his intention to join the Initiatives from Osaka party.
