= Toshihide Muraoka =

Japanese politician (born 1960)

- 村岡 敏英
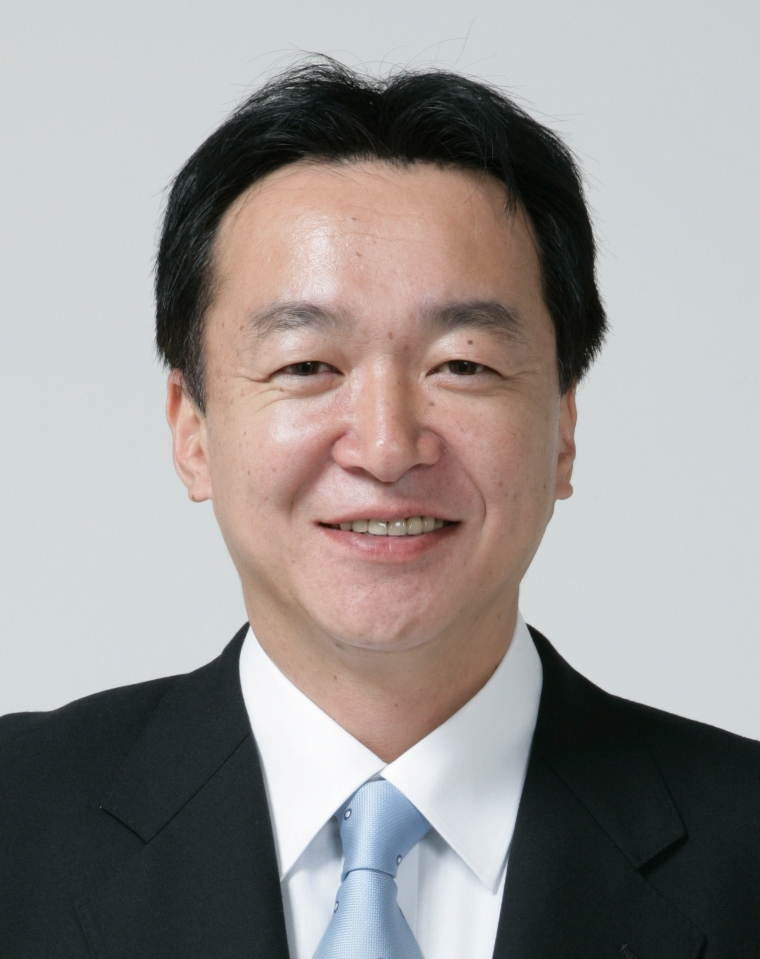

Member of the House of Representatives
- Incumbent
- Assumed office 27 October 2024
- Preceded by: Nobuhide Minorikawa
- Constituency: Akita 3rd
- In office 16 December 2012 – 28 September 2017
- Constituency: Tohoku PR

Personal details
- Born: 25 July 1960 (age 66) Honjō, Akita, Japan
- Party: DPP (since 2022)
- Other political affiliations: LDP (2007–2010); SPJ (2010–2012); JRP (2012–2014); JIP (2014–2015); VoR (2015–2016); DP (2016–2017); KnT (2017–2018); Independent (2018–2022)
- Parent: Kanezō Muraoka (father)
- Education: Nihon University

Toshihide Muraoka (born 25 July 1960) is a Japanese politician from the Democratic Party For the People (DPP).
