= Yamagata 1st district =

Japan House of Representatives constituency

Parliamentary constituencies in Yamagata prefecture

Yamagata 1st district (山形県第1区, Yamagata-ken dai-ikku or simply 山形県第1区, Yamagata-ikku) is a single-member constituency of the House of Representatives in the Diet of Japan. It is located in Eastern Yamagata and covers the cities of Yamagata, Kaminoyama and Tendō and the county of Higashimurayama. As of 2012, 306,446 eligible voters were registered in the district.

Since its creation until 2012, the district was mainly contested by Democrat Michihiko Kano (formerly Hata group, leading his own faction from August 2011, until the 1990s: LDP, Fukuda faction), agriculture minister in the realigned Kan cabinet, and Liberal Democrat Toshiaki Endō (Koga faction), former vice minister in the education and science ministry during the First Abe cabinet. Toshiaki Endō held the seat from 2012 to 2026. After his retirement, his son Hiroaki took over.

== List of representatives ==
Representative	Party	Dates	Notes
Michihiko Kano	NFP	1996–2000	Founded Kokumin no Koe ("Voice of the People") after the dissolution of the NFP (NFP→Kokumin no Koe→Minseitō (lit. "Civil Government Party" or "Democratic Party", Engrish: Good Governance Party)→DPJ)
Michihiko Kano	DPJ	2000–2003	Reelected in the Tōhoku PR block
Toshiaki Endō	LDP	2003–2009	Reelected in the Tōhoku PR block
Michihiko Kano	DPJ	2009–2012	Failed re-election in the PR block
Toshiaki Endō	LDP	2012–2026	Retired
Hiroaki Endo	LDP	2026-	Incumbent

== Election results ==
2026
Party	Candidate	Votes	%	±%
LDP	Hiroaki Endo	106,063	61.2	▲5.76
Centrist Reform	Masahiro Harada	48,443	28.0	▼10.96
Sanseitō	Sakurada Kyoko	18,692	10.8	
Registered electors		292,635		
Turnout		173,198	60.44	▲2.82
LDP hold				

2024
Party	Candidate	Votes	%	±%
LDP	Toshiaki Endō (endorsed by Komeito)	92,238	55.48	▼4.49
CDP	Masahiro Harada	64,717	38.93	▼1.10
JCP	osamu Miidera	9,293	5.59	▼2.85
Registered electors		295,741		
Turnout		166,248	57.62	▼3.97
LDP hold				

2021
Party	Candidate	Votes	%	±%
LDP	Toshiaki Endō (endorsed by Komeito)	110,688	59.97	▲2.70
CDP	Masahiro Harada	73,872	40.03	New
Registered electors		303,982		
Turnout		184,560	61.59	▲1.79
LDP hold				

2017
Party	Candidate	Votes	%	±%
LDP	Toshiaki Endō (endorsed by Komeito)	104.22	57.27	▼3.87
Kibō no Tō	Arai Liver	62,407	34.29	New
JCP	Show Ishikawa	15,354	8.44	▼1.85
Registered electors		309,496		
Turnout		181,988	59.80	▲5.59
LDP hold				

2014
Party	Candidate	Votes	%	±%
LDP	Toshiaki Endō (endorsed by Komeito)	98,508	61.14	▲6.51
Democratic	Masahiro Harada	46,029	28.57	▼9.08
JCP	Show Ishikawa	16,577	10.29	▲2.5
Registered electors		304,983		
Turnout		161,114	54.21	▼8.81
LDP hold				

2012
Party	Candidate	Votes	%	±%
LDP	Toshiaki Endō (endorsed by Komeito)	102,169	54.6	
Democratic	Michihiko Kano (endorsed by PNP)	70,411	37.6	
JCP	Shō Ishikawa	14,447	7.7	

2009
Party	Candidate	Votes	%	±%
Democratic	Michihiko Kano (supported by SDP, PNP)	106,202	46.2	
LDP	Toshiaki Endō (supported by Komeito) (elected by PR)	104,911	45.7	
Independent (Hiranuma group member)	Kaori Itō	11,419	5.0	
JCP	Masayuki Satō	6,021	2.6	
Happiness Realization	Daigorō Mori	1,149	0.5	
Turnout		231,712	75.71	

2005
Party	Candidate	Votes	%	±%
LDP	Toshiaki Endō	125,774	56.4	
Democratic	Michihiko Kano	86,755	38.9	
JCP	Shō Ishikawa	10,536	4.7	
Turnout		225,764	73.81	

2003
Party	Candidate	Votes	%	±%
LDP	Toshiaki Endō	100,764	49.9	
Democratic	Michihiko Kano (elected by PR)	81,580	40.4	
Social Democratic	Shōsuke Saitō	12,266	6.1	
JCP	Shō Ishikawa	7,356	3.6	
Turnout		204,584	67.2	

2000
Party	Candidate	Votes	%	±%
Democratic	Michihiko Kano	90,349	52.0	
LDP	Toshiaki Endō	70,290	40.5	
JCP	Akiko Satō	12,996	7.5	

1996
Party	Candidate	Votes	%	±%
New Frontier	Michihiko Kano	81,047	48.3	
LDP	Toshiaki Endō (elected by PR)	60,748	36.2	
Social Democratic	Shingo Yamazaki	15,002	8.9	
JCP	Tatsuo Inoue	10,955	6.5	
Turnout		170,554	69.5	
