= Hiroaki Endo =

Japanese politician (born 1986)

- 遠藤 寛明

Member of the House of Representatives
- Incumbent
- Assumed office 8 February 2026
- Preceded by: Toshiaki Endo
- Constituency: Yamagata 1st

Member of the Yamagata Prefectural Assembly
- In office 30 April 2019 – 20 January 2026
- Constituency: Kaminoyama City

Personal details
- Born: 21 November 1986 (age 39) Kaminoyama, Yamagata, Japan
- Party: Liberal Democratic
- Parent: Toshiaki Endo (father)
- Education: Nihon University; Keio University

Hiroaki Endo (遠藤寛明, Endo Hiroaki; born 21 November 1986) is a Japanese politician serving as a member of the House of Representatives since 2026. He is the son of Toshiaki Endo.
