= Jiro Kimura =

Japanese politician

- 木村 次郎
- Official portrait, 2021

Member of the House of Representatives
- Incumbent
- Assumed office 9 February 2026
- Preceded by: Hanako Okada
- Constituency: Aomori 3rd
- In office 24 October 2017 – 9 October 2024
- Preceded by: Tadamori Ōshima
- Succeeded by: Hanako Okada
- Constituency: Aomori 3rd

Personal details
- Born: 16 December 1967 (age 58) Fujisaki, Aomori, Japan
- Party: Liberal Democratic
- Relatives: Tarō Kimura (brother)
- Education: Chuo University

Jiro Kimura (born 16 December 1967) is a Japanese politician who served as a member of the House of Representatives of Japan.

== Career ==
He was a lawyer before he was elected in 2021.
