= Hosei Norota =

Japanese politician (1929–2019)

Hōsei Norota
- 野呂田 芳成
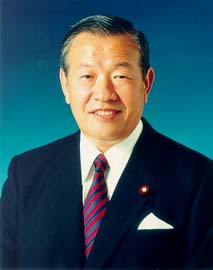
- Official portrait, 1999

Director-General of the Japan Defense Agency
- In office 20 November 1998 – 5 October 1999
- Prime Minister: Keizō Obuchi
- Preceded by: Fukushiro Nukaga
- Succeeded by: Riki Kawara

Minister of Agriculture, Forestry and Fisheries
- In office 8 August 1995 – 11 January 1996
- Prime Minister: Tomiichi Murayama
- Preceded by: Taichirō Ōgawara
- Succeeded by: Ichizō Ōhara

Member of the House of Representatives
- In office 19 December 1983 – 21 July 2009
- Preceded by: Hirohide Ishida
- Succeeded by: Hiroshi Kawaguchi
- Constituency: Akita 1st (1983–1996); Akita 2nd (1996–2009)

Member of the House of Councillors
- In office 11 July 1977 – 9 July 1983
- Preceded by: Masaji Sawada
- Succeeded by: Hiromitsu Deguchi
- Constituency: Akita at-large

Personal details
- Born: 25 October 1929 Noshiro, Akita, Japan
- Died: 23 May 2019 (aged 89) Tokyo, Japan
- Party: Liberal Democratic
- Education: Chuo University

Hosei Norota (野呂田 芳成, Norota Hōsei; 25 October 1929 – 23 May 2019) was a Japanese politician of the Liberal Democratic Party, a member of the House of Representatives in the Diet (national legislature). A native of Noshiro, Akita and graduate of Chuo University he joined the Ministry of Construction in 1953. Leaving the ministry, he was elected to the House of Councillors in the Diet for the first time in 1977. In 1983 he was elected to the House of Representatives for the first time. From 1995 to 1996 he served as the Minister of Agriculture, Forestry and Fisheries in Tomiichi Murayama's cabinet. In 1998 he served briefly as Director General of the Japan Defense Agency.

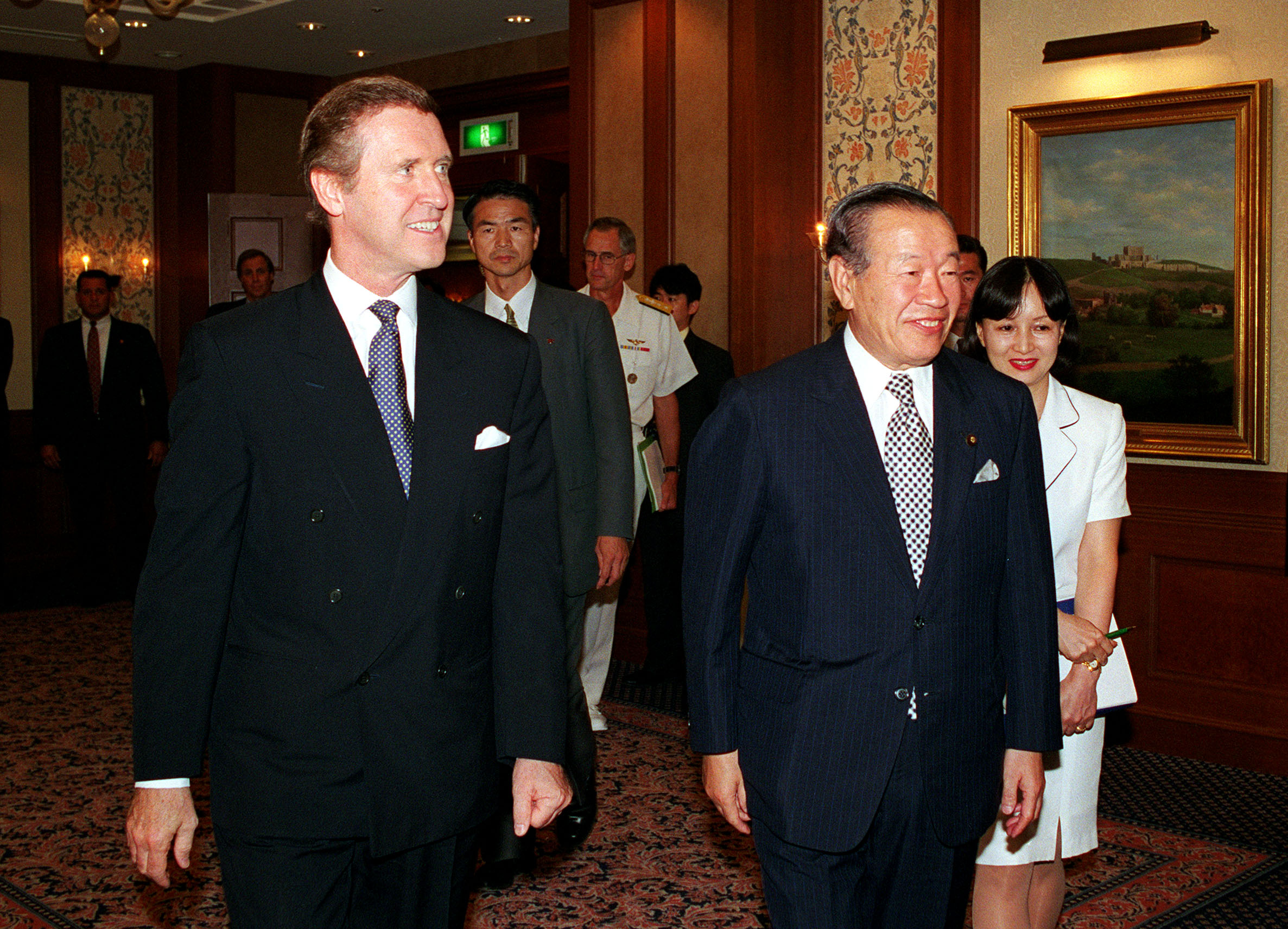
Norota with William S. Cohen

In 2001, Norota received the civilian honor Padma Vibhushan from the President of India.

Norota died of bladder cancer on 23 May 2019 at a Tokyo hospital, aged 89.

House of Representatives (Japan)
Preceded by Kishirō Nakamura	Chair, Committee on Construction of the House of Representatives; 1988–1989	Succeeded by Yoshiyuki Tōya
Preceded by Sadatoshi Ozato	Chair, Committee on Fundamental National Policies of the House of Representatives; 2000–2001	Succeeded by Hisao Horinouchi
Preceded by Shōzō Harada	Chair, Committee on Budget of the House of Representatives; 2001–2002	Succeeded by Yūji Tsushima
Political offices
Preceded by Taichirō Ōgawara	Minister of Agriculture, Forestry and Fisheries; 1995–1996	Succeeded by Ichizō Ōhara
Preceded by Fukushiro Nukaga	Director-General of the Japan Defense Agency; 1998–1999	Succeeded by Tsutomu Kawara
