= Hanako Okada =

Japanese female lawyer and politician (1980-)

- 岡田 華子

Member of the House of Representatives
- In office October 29, 2024 – January 23, 2026
- Preceded by: Jiro Kimura
- Succeeded by: Jiro Kimura
- Constituency: Aomori 3rd

Personal details
- Born: Hanako Miura; August 2, 1980 (age 46) Hirosaki, Aomori, Japan
- Party: CRA (since 2026)
- Other political affiliations: CDP (2019–2026)
- Children: 2
- Education: Hokkaido University; Hiroshima University
- Occupation: Lawyer and politician

Hanako Okada (Japanese: 岡田 華子), née Miura, (born August 2, 1980) is a Japanese lawyer and politician, who served as a member of the House of Representatives from 2024 to 2026. She is a member of the Constitutional Democratic Party of Japan.

== Early life ==
Okada was born in Hirosaki City, Aomori Prefecture on August 2, 1980. She graduated from the Faculty of Law at Hokkaido University and the Professional Degree Program in Law at Hiroshima University Law School before joining AGC Inc..

== Career ==
In 2019, the former Constitutional Democratic Party of Japan considered fielding Okada in the 25th regular election for the House of Councillors, but she decided not to run due to child-rearing commitments.

On October 24, 2023, it was announced that she would be officially nominated by the Constitutional Democratic Party of Japan for the Aomori 3rd district.

She won the 50th general election for the House of Representatives, held on October 27, 2024, in the Aomori 3rd District, defeating Jiro Kimura, who was endorsed by the Liberal Democratic Party (LDP), for her first election.

Okada was the first woman to win in a single-seat district in Aomori Prefecture and the first non-LDP person to win that district. Following her election, Hanako has sought to confront Japan's shrinking population, including addressing rapid urbanization in the context of rural depopulation.

== Personal life ==
Hanako is the mother of two children.
