= Wakako Sawara =

Japanese female dentist and politician (1953-)

- 佐原 若子

Member of the House of Representatives
- In office November 1, 2024 – January 23, 2026
- Preceded by: Chizuko Takahashi
- Constituency: Tohoku PR

Personal details
- Born: November 22, 1953 (age 72) Goshogawara, Aomori, Japan
- Party: Reiwa Shinsengumi
- Education: School of Dentistry, Tsurumi University
- Occupation: Dentist and Politician
- Website: Official Website

Wakako Sawara (佐原 若子) (born November 22, 1953) is a Japanese politician and dentist. She is a member of the House of Representatives (1 term) and a director of the Aomori Prefectural Medical Association.

== Early life ==
Born in Goshogawara, Aomori Prefecture on November 22, 1953. After graduating from Aomori Prefectural Goshogawara High School and the Tsurumi University School of Dentistry, she became a dentist. She served as the former director of the Aomori Prefecture Medical Association and is a certified dental laser practitioner, and director of Kojima Dental Clinic. She currently lives in Hirosaki, Aomori Prefecture.

== Career ==
She ran as an independent candidate (recommended by the Aomori Citizens' Alliance) against the incumbent governor, Shingo Mimura, in the gubernatorial election held on June 2, 2019, but was defeated.

In the 50th general election for the House of Representatives to be held on October 27, 2024, she ran as a candidate endorsed by Reiwa Shinsengumi, coming in third place in the proportional representation Tohoku block. Reiwa Shinsengumi won one seat in the proportional representation Tohoku block, but the top two candidates on the list were also running in single-seat constituencies, and both received fewer votes than the point at which their deposits were forfeited (one-tenth of the total valid votes), so Sawara was elected for the first time.

== Positions ==
Sawars advocates against nuclear fuel and is an organizer of the Anti-Nuclear Doctors Association. She supports food security, energy security, including environmentally friendly micro-hydropower generation, and promotes small and medium businesses over large industries. She is a strong supporter of protecting natural resources and satoyama. Her opposition comes from having discovere plutonium in the teeth of children.

== Elections ==
House of Representatives (Japan)
Preceded by	Member of the House of Representatives for Tohoku proportional blick (proportional); 2024–present	Incumbent
