= Ayuko Kato =

Japanese politician (born 1979)

- 加藤 鮎子
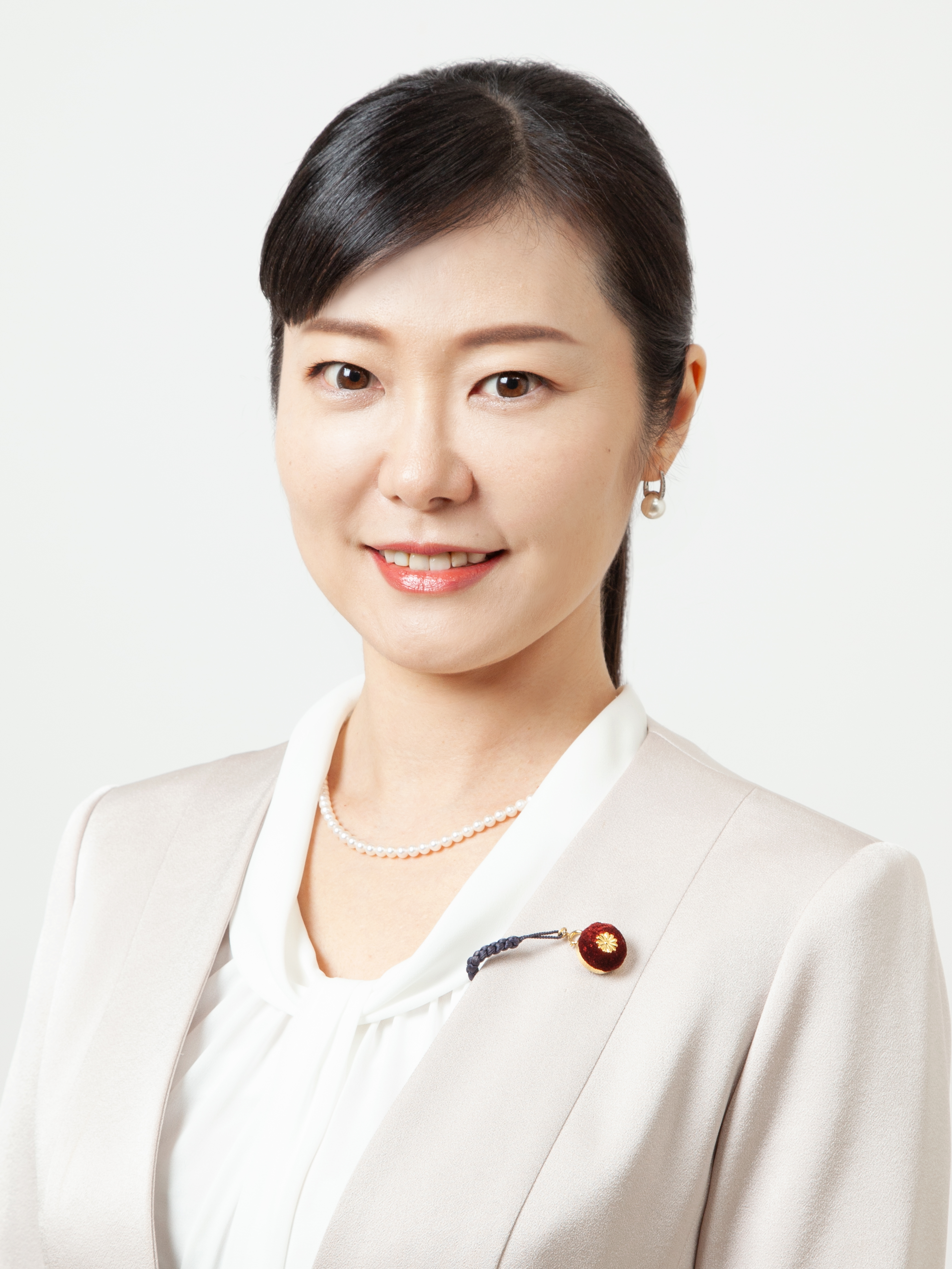
- Official portrait, 2023

Minister of State for Special Missions Child Policy, Youth Empowerment, Declining Birthrate, Gender Equality
- In office 13 September 2023 – 1 October 2024
- Prime Minister: Fumio Kishida
- Preceded by: Masanobu Ogura
- Succeeded by: Junko Mihara

Member of the House of Representatives
- Incumbent
- Assumed office 16 December 2014
- Preceded by: Juichi Abe
- Constituency: Yamagata 3rd

Personal details
- Born: 19 April 1979 (age 47) Tsuruoka, Yamagata, Japan
- Party: Liberal Democratic
- Spouse: Kensuke Miyazaki (m. 2006; div. 2009)
- Children: 2
- Parent: Koichi Kato (father)
- Education: Keio University

Ayuko Kato (加藤 鮎子, Katō Ayuko; born 19 April 1979) is a Japanese politician of the Liberal Democratic Party (LDP) who is the current member of the House of Representatives for Yamagata 3rd district. She served as Minister of State in the Kishida Cabinet.

Kato graduated from Keio University Faculty of Law in 2003 and from the School of International and Public Affairs of Columbia University in 2008.

Kato was elected in the 2014 Japanese general election to the same seat as her father Koichi Kato, a longtime member of the House of Representatives for Yamagata Prefecture who had lost the seat in the 2012 general election. From 2006 to 2009, Kato was married to LDP politician Kensuke Miyazaki, who later served as member for Kyoto 3rd district from 2012 to 2016.
