= Takashi Midorikawa =

Japanese politician (born 1985)

- 緑川 貴士
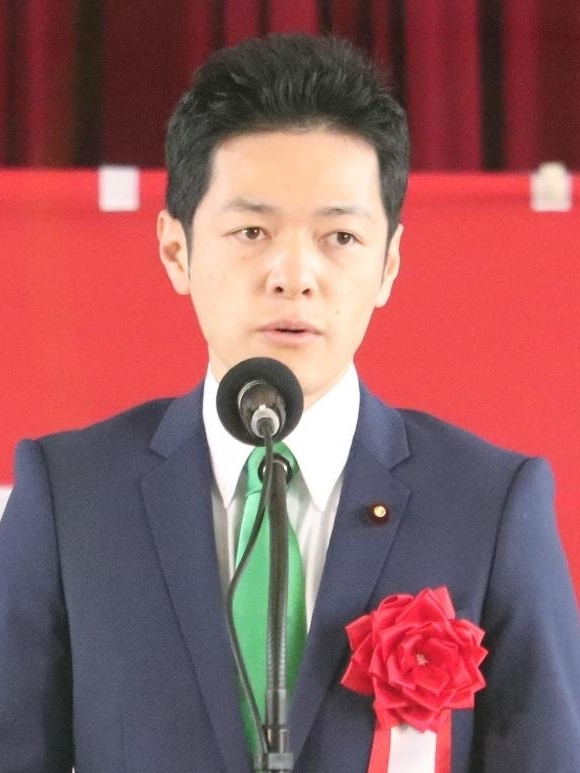
- Midorikawa in 2020

Member of the House of Representatives
- In office 22 October 2017 – 23 January 2026
- Preceded by: Multi-member district
- Succeeded by: Junji Fukuhara
- Constituency: Tohoku PR (2017–2021); Akita 2nd (2021–2026)

Personal details
- Born: 10 January 1985 (age 41) Hannō, Saitama, Japan
- Party: CRA (since 2026)
- Other political affiliations: DPJ (2014–2016); DP (2016–2017); KnT (2017–2018); DPP (2018–2020); CDP (2020–2026)
- Education: Waseda University

Takashi Midorikawa (緑川貴士, Midorikawa Takashi; born 10 January 1985) is a Japanese politician serving as a member of the House of Representatives since 2017. He previously worked as a television presenter for Akita Asahi Broadcasting.
