= Toshiaki Endo =

Japanese politician

- 遠藤 利明
- Official portrait, 2015

Member of the House of Representatives
- In office 10 November 2003 – 23 January 2026
- Preceded by: Michihiko Kano
- Succeeded by: Hiroaki Endo
- Constituency: Yamagata 1st (2003–2009); Tohoku PR (2009–2012); Yamagata 1st (2012–2026)
- In office 19 July 1993 – 2 June 2000
- Preceded by: Takehiko Endo
- Succeeded by: Multi-member district
- Constituency: Yamagata 1st (1993–1996); Tohoku PR (1996–2000)

Member of the Yamagata Prefectural Assembly
- In office 1983–1990

Personal details
- Born: 17 January 1950 (age 76) Kaminoyama, Yamagata, Japan
- Party: LDP (since 1994)
- Other political affiliations: JNP (1992–1994)
- Children: Hiroaki Endo
- Education: Chuo University

Toshiaki Endo (遠藤 利明, Endō Toshiaki; born 1950) is a Japanese politician of the Liberal Democratic Party, a member of the House of Representatives in the Diet (national legislature).

== Early life ==
Endo is a native of Kaminoyama, Yamagata and graduate of Chuo University (where he played Rugby).

== Political career ==
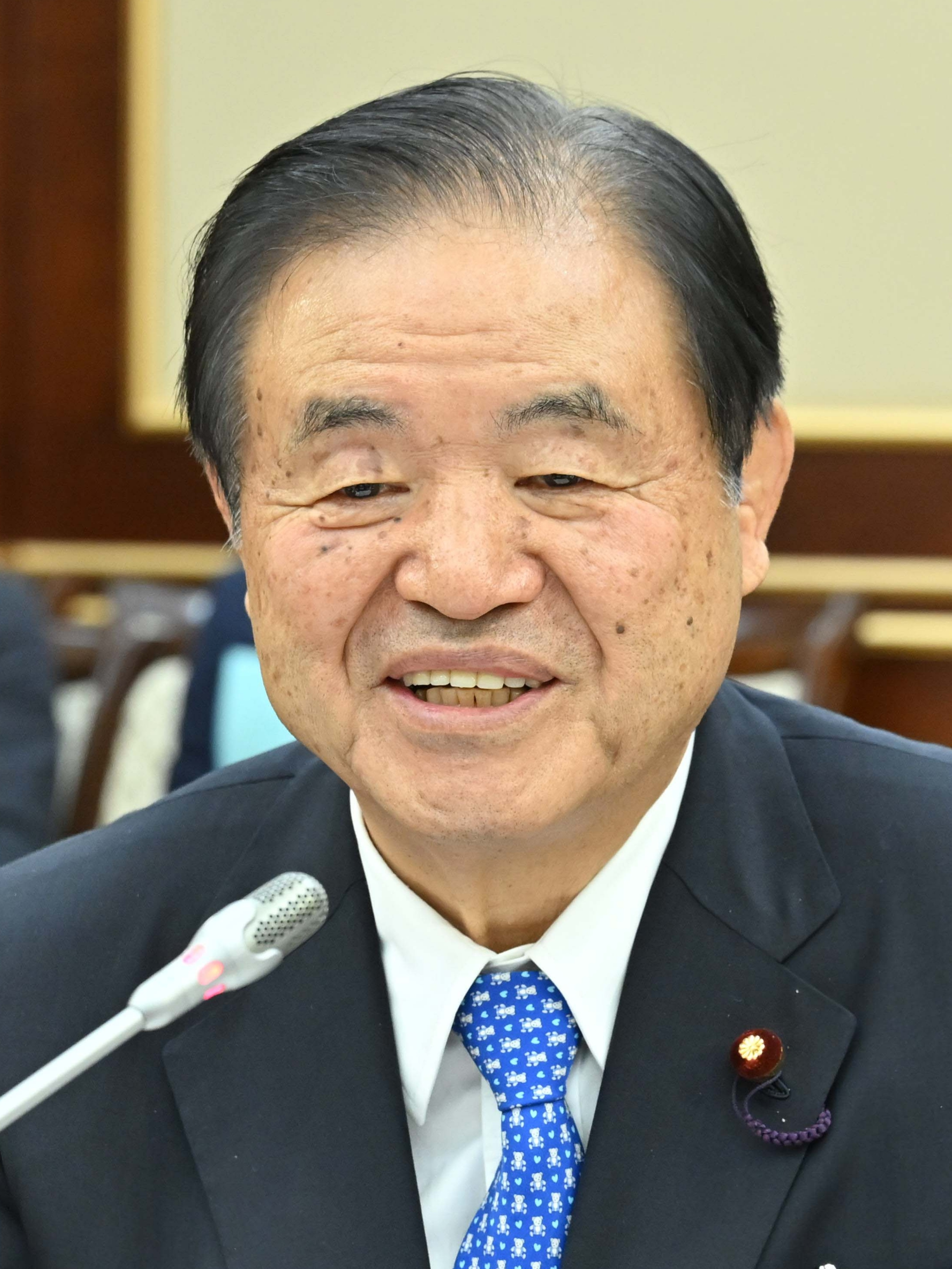
Endō in 2023

Endo was elected to the assembly of Yamagata Prefecture in 1983, serving there for one term. In 1993 he was elected to the House of Representatives for the first time as an independent after an unsuccessful run in 1990. He headed an overhaul of Japan's English language education. In 2015 he was appointed to oversee the 2020 Summer Olympics preparations on behalf of the Japanese government.

=== Donation scandal ===
In February 2016 it emerged that he had received ¥9.5 million over five years in donations from the head of an unnamed Tokyo-based teacher dispatch company as the company was trying to boost the use of Assistant Language Teachers (ALTs) across Japan. It was alleged that due to the donations Endo lobbied for greater use of ALTs and supported a project the company was pushing. Staff of the company spoke about how they appreciated Endo's efforts.

Endo admitted the donations and expanding the use of ALTs but claimed that he had done nothing wrong. Prime Minister Abe defended Endo and said “My administration would never let cash affect its policies”.

Political offices
Preceded by Hakubun Shimomura	Minister in charge of the Tokyo Olympic and Paralympic Games; 2015–2016	Succeeded by Tamayo Marukawa
Party political offices
Liberal Democratic Party
Preceded by Yoshio Kimura	Chairman of the Party Finance Committee; 2009–2010	Succeeded by Jiro Kawasaki
Preceded by Yasufumi Tanahashi	Director of the International Bureau; 2012	Succeeded by Tatsuya Ito
Preceded by Taimei Yamaguchi	Chairman of the Election Strategy Committee; 2021–2022	Succeeded by Hiroshi Moriyama
Preceded by Tatsuo Fukuda	Chairman of the General Council; 2022–2023	Succeeded by Hiroshi Moriyama
Preceded by Haruko Arimura	Dean of the Central Institute of Politics; 2023-2026	Succeeded by Hiroshi Yamada
Non-profit organization positions
Preceded by Masatoshi Itō	President of the Japan Sport Association; 2023-present	Incumbent
