= Takumi Hayashi =

Japanese politician (born 1997)

- 林 拓海

Member of the House of Representatives
- Incumbent
- Assumed office 8 February 2026
- Constituency: Tohoku PR

Personal details
- Born: 1 September 1997 (age 29) Kushiro, Hokkaido, Japan
- Party: Team Mirai
- Education: Hokkaido University of Education

Takumi Hayashi (林拓海, Hayashi Takumi; born 1 September 1997) is a Japanese politician serving as a member of the House of Representatives since 2026. He previously worked as a school counselor.
