= Akita 3rd district =

Japan House of Representatives constituency

- Parliamentary constituency for the Japanese House of Representatives
- Numbered map of Akita Prefecture single-member districts
- Prefecture: Akita
- Proportional District: Tōhoku
- Electorate: 310,837

Current constituency
- Created: 1994
- Seats: One
- Party: DPP
- Representative: Toshihide Muraoka
- Municipalities: Yokote, Yurihonjō, Yuzawa, Daisen, Semboku, Nikaho, Senboku District, Ogachi District

Akita 3rd district is a constituency of the House of Representatives in the Diet of Japan.

== History ==
The district was created after the 1994 electoral reform. Initially, the seat was given to Kanzo Muraoka, who had previously served as Chief Cabinet Secretary, while Hidefumi Minorikawa was elected proportionally, as a deal to let both hold seats in the House of Representatives. However, after Hidefumi died in 2003, the deal dissolved. His son, Nobuhide Minorikawa, challenged Muraoka as an independent. Nobuhide managed to defeat Muraoka in the 2003 election, securing the seat.

Muraoka was indicted in the Japan Dental Federation Black Donation Case, so did not run in the 2005 election. Instead, his second son, Toshihide Muraoka, ran instead. He lost to Minorikawa again. They held a rematch in 2009, but this time were upstaged by DPJ-ite Kimiko Kyono, leaving both of the others without seats. By 2012, Kyono had joined the TPJ, as DPJ and other splinter candidates struggled across the country. Both Toshihide and Minorikawa ran for the seat, and Minorikawa won. Toshihide had joined the conservative opposition Japan Restoration Party, and was elected proportionally from the group.

In 2014, Toshihide and Minorikawa battled again, and Minorikawa won. However, the final margin of votes was just under 6,000, and Toshihide was resurrected again with the JIP. In 2017, Toshihide joined Kibō no Tō to challenge Minorikawa under the party. However, he was defeated by six points, and Toshihide was unable to be resurrected proportionally due to the poor performance of Kibō nationwide.

Toshihide did not run for the seat in 2021, and Minorikawa only faced a JCP challenger who was dispatched by a wide margin.

In 2024, four candidates ran, the most since 2012. Not only was Toshihide back under the DPP banner to challenge Minorikawa, but both a CDP challenger, Ikuyo Ogawa, was present, along with another JCP candidate, Kazuhisa Fujita. In the end, Toshihide finally succeeded in unseating Minorikawa; it was the first time in the five elections Toshihide had run in that he had unseated Minorikawa, and the first time in the district's history a non-LDP affiliate had won. (Note: Minorikawa won as an independent in 2003, but switched back to the party in 2004.) Minorikawa was nevertheless resurrected proportionally. It was also the first time since 2000 that a Muraoka won the district.

== List of representatives ==
Representative	Party	Years served	Notes
Kenzo Muraoka	LDP	1996-2003	
Nobuhide Minorikawa	Ind.	2003-2004	
Nobuhide Minorikawa	LDP	2004-2009	Dissolved independent caucus and joined the LDP.
Kimiko Kyono	DPJ	2009-2011	
Kimiko Kyono	PLF	2011	Participated in founding of PLF.
Kimiko Kyono	TPJ	2011-2012	Joined TPJ when PLF merged. Lost re-election.
Nobuhide Minorikawa	LDP	2009-2024	Lost re-election. Revived on proportional block.
Toshihide Muraoka	DPP	2024-	

== Election results ==
2026
Party	Candidate	Votes	%	±%
DPP	Toshihide Muraoka	87,573	50.7	▲5.67
LDP	Nobuhide Minorikawa (won a seat in PR block)	85,063	49.3	▲8.76
Turnout		172,636	59.78	▼1.82
DPP hold				

2024
Party	Candidate	Votes	%	±%
DPP	Toshihide Muraoka	83,001	45.03	New
LDP	Nobuhide Minorikawa (won a seat in PR block)	74,722	40.54	▼37.41
CDP	Ogawa Ikuyo	22,043	11.96	New
JCP	Kazuhisa Fujita	4,562	2.47	▼19.58
Turnout		184,32	61.60	▲5.71
DPP gain from LDP				

2021
Party	Candidate	Votes	%	±%
LDP	Nobuhide Minorikawa	134,734	77.95	▲27.38
JCP	Akira Sugiyama	38,118	22.05	▲16.74
Turnout		172,852	55.89	▼8.33
LDP hold				

2017
Party	Candidate	Votes	%	±%
LDP	Nobuhide Minorikawa	107,432	50.57	▲2.78
Kibō no Tō	Toshihide Muraoka	93,746	44.13	New
JCP	Akira Tomioka	11,274	5.31	▼1.97
Turnout		212,452	64.22	▲6.14
LDP hold				

2014
Party	Candidate	Votes	%	±%
LDP	Nobuhide Minorikawa	94,096	47.79	▲5.11
Ishin	Toshihide Muraoka	88,483	44.94	New
JCP	Keiko Wagatsuma	14,333	7.28	▲2.2
Turnout		196,912	54.08	▼5.85
LDP hold				

2012
Party	Candidate	Votes	%	±%
LDP	Nobuhide Minorikawa	97,164	42.68	▲9.38
Restoration	Toshihide Muraoka	74,422	32.69	New
Tomorrow	Kimiko Kyono	25,185	11.06	New
Democratic	Mariko Matsui	23,665	10.40	▼27.02
JCP	Chouemon Sato	7,211	3.17	New
Turnout		227,647	65.64	▼10.06
LDP gain from Tomorrow				

2009
Party	Candidate	Votes	%	±%
Democratic	Kimiko Kyono	101,777	37.42	▲7.59
LDP	Nobuhide Minorikawa	90,575	33.30	▼8.02
Independent	Toshihide Muraoka	76,787	28.23	▼0.62
Happiness Realization	Atsushi Nishimoto	2,847	1.05	New
Turnout		271,986	75.70	▲1.07
Democratic gain from LDP				

2005
Party	Candidate	Votes	%	±%
LDP	Nobuhide Minorikawa	114,228	41.32	▼2.23
Democratic	Kimiko Kyono	82,480	29.83	New
Independent	Toshihide Muraoka	79,759	28.85	New
Turnout		276,467	74.63	▲2.45
LDP hold				

2003
Party	Candidate	Votes	%	±%
Independent	Nobuhide Minorikawa	133,981	49.68	New
LDP	Kenzo Muraoka	117,453	43.55	▼19.45
JCP	Keiko Wagatsuma	18,276	6.78	▲0.67
Turnout		269,710	74.63	
Independent gain from LDP				

2000
Party	Candidate	Votes	%	±%
LDP	Kenzo Muraoka	170,176	63.00	▲5.11
Democratic	Tatsuro Nakajima	45,572	16.87	New
Liberal	Tomoki Sasayama	37,876	14.02	New
JCP	Masao Waga	16,517	6.11	▼3.25
Turnout		270,141		
LDP hold				

1996
Party	Candidate	Votes	%	±%
LDP	Kenzo Muraoka	150,956	57.89	New
New Frontier	Hajime Terada	85,390	32.75	New
JCP	Toshio Fuji	24,405	9.36	New
Turnout		260,751		
LDP hold				
