= Daijiro Kikuchi =

Japanese politician (born 1982)

- 菊池 大二郎
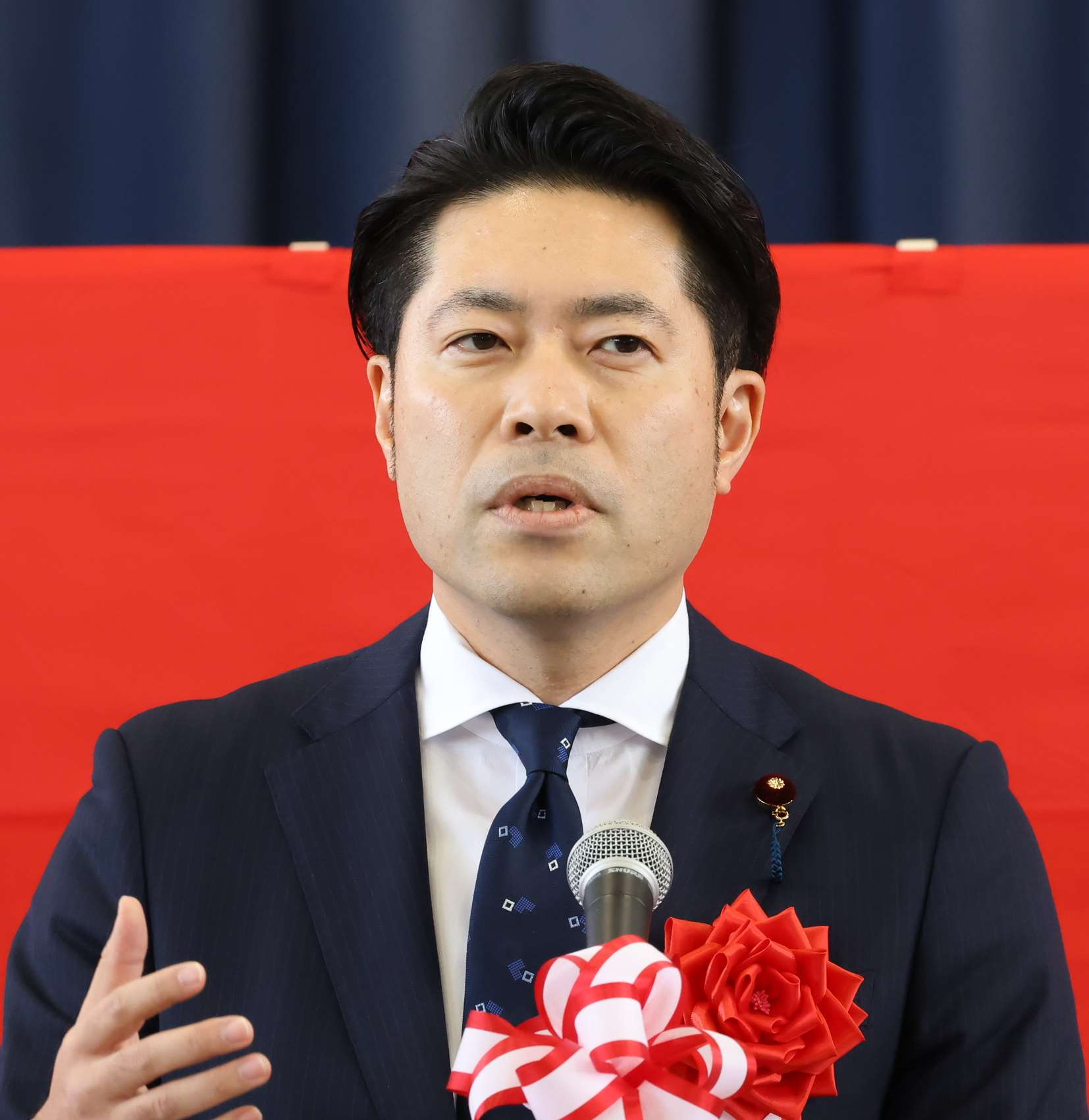
- Kikuchi in 2024

Member of the House of Representatives
- Incumbent
- Assumed office 1 November 2024
- Preceded by: Atsushi Hayasaka
- Constituency: Tohoku PR

Member of the Yamagata Prefectural Assembly
- In office April 2019 – April 2023
- Constituency: Murayama City

Member of the Murayama City Council
- In office October 2015 – 17 January 2019

Personal details
- Born: 9 July 1982 (age 44) Murayama, Yamagata, Japan
- Party: DPP (since 2019)
- Other political affiliations: Independent (2015–2019)
- Education: Gakushuin University

Daijiro Kikuchi (菊池大二郎, Kikuchi Daijiro; born 9 July 1982) is a Japanese politician serving as a member of the House of Representatives since 2024. From 2019 to 2023, he was a member of the Yamagata Prefectural Assembly.
