= Akita 2nd district =

Japan House of Representatives constituency

- Parliamentary constituency for the Japanese House of Representatives
- Numbered map of Akita Prefecture single-member districts
- Prefecture: Akita
- Proportional District: Tōhoku
- Electorate: 237,813 (2026)

Current constituency
- Created: 1994
- Seats: One
- Party: LDP
- Representative: Junji Fukuhara

Akita 2nd district is a constituency of the House of Representatives in the Diet of Japan.

Akita 2nd district is a single-member constituency of the House of Representatives, the lower house of the National Diet of Japan. It consists of the northern part of Akita Prefecture, including the cities of Katagami, Kazuno, Kitaakita, Noshiro, Ōdate, and Oga, and the districts of Kazuno, Kitaakita, Minamiakita, and Yamamoto.

As of February 8, 2026, the district was home to 237,813 constituents.

== List of representatives ==
Representative	Party	Dates	Notes
Hosei Norota	Independent	1996 – 2009	Elected in 1996, 2000, and 2003 with LDP, expelled and won reelection as an independent supported by the PNP in 2005
Hiroshi Kawaguchi	Independent	2009 – 2012	
Katsutoshi Kaneda	LDP	2012 – 2021	
Takashi Midorikawa	CDP	2021 – 2026	Failed to win a seat in the PR Block
Junji Fukuhara	LDP	2026 –	

== Election results ==
2026
Party	Candidate	Votes	%	±%
LDP	Junji Fukuhara	70,352	55.0	▲8.6
Centrist Reform	Takashi Midorikawa	57,666	45.0	▼5.4
Turnout		128,018	54.96	▼3.78
LDP gain from Centrist Reform				

2024
Party	Candidate	Votes	%	±%
CDP	Takashi Midorikawa	70,895	50.4	▼2.1
LDP	Junji Fukuhara (won a seat in PR block)	65,200	46.4	▼1.1
JCP	Umeyoshi Yamauchi	4,505	3.2	
Turnout			58.74	▼2.49
CDP hold				

2021
Party	Candidate	Votes	%	±%
CDP	Takashi Midorikawa	81,845	52.5	▲7.2
LDP	Katsutoshi Kaneda (won a seat in PR block)	73,945	47.5	▲1.2
Turnout			61.23	▲1.11
CDP gain from LDP				

2017
Party	Candidate	Votes	%	±%
LDP	Katsutoshi Kaneda	74,835	46.3	▼8.4
CDP	Takashi Midorikawa (won a seat in PR block)	73,163	45.3	▲7.7
JCP	Yuri Fujimoto	13,642	8.4	▲0.9
Turnout			60.12	▲5.58
LDP hold				

2014
Party	Candidate	Votes	%	±%
LDP	Katsutoshi Kaneda	82,046	54.7	▲3.2
Democratic	Takashi Midorikawa	56,701	37.8	▲5.6
JCP	Kaneji Fujimoto	11,247	7.5	▲3.2
Turnout			54.54	▼8.74
LDP hold				

2012
Party	Candidate	Votes	%	±%
LDP	Katsutoshi Kaneda	91,747	51.5	▲9.5
Democratic	Hiroshi Kawaguchi	57,392	32.2	▼10.5
Social Democratic	Hiroshi Ishida	21,483	12.1	▲1.3
JCP	Kuniyasu Satō	7,581	4.3	
Turnout			63.28	
LDP gain from Independent				

2009
Party	Candidate	Votes	%	±%
Independent	Hiroshi Kawaguchi	93,951	42.7	
LDP	Katsutoshi Kaneda (won a seat in PR block)	92,600	42.0	▲17.1
Social Democratic	Kiyohiro Yamamoto	23,719	10.8	▼2.3
Your	Shigehito Sasaki	8,645	3.9	▼17.0
Happiness Realization	Junichi Fujiwara	1,342	0.6	
Turnout				▼
Independent gain from Independent				

2005
Party	Candidate	Votes	%	±%
Independent	Hosei Norota	80,974	37.6	
LDP	Takaki Ono	53,555	24.9	
Democratic	Shigehito Sasaki	45,020	20.9	▼6.6
Social Democratic	Kiyohiro Yamamoto	28,131	13.1	▼0.5
JCP	Kaneji Fujimoto	7,606	3.5	▼1.8
Turnout				▲
Independent hold				

2003
Party	Candidate	Votes	%	±%
LDP	Hosei Norota	109,296	53.6	
Democratic	Shigehito Sasaki	55,969	27.5	
Social Democratic	Kiyohiro Yamamoto	27,624	13.6	
JCP	Kishin Yakashi	10,838	5.3	
Turnout				▲
LDP hold				

2000
Party	Candidate	Votes	%	±%
LDP	Hosei Norota	89,428	54.3	▼0.6
Social Democratic	Kenjirō Hatakeyama	49,443	30.0	▼4.3
JCP	Tokiko Kikuchi	13,090	7.9	▲0.6
Liberal	Tomihiro Kudō	12,736	7.7	
Turnout				
LDP hold				

1996
Party	Candidate	Votes	%	±%
LDP	Hosei Norota	86,677	54.9	
Social Democratic	Kenjirō Hatakeyama	54,131	34.3	
JCP	Ryōichi Kudō	11,172	7.1	
Liberal League	Taku Miura	5,774	3.7	
Turnout			68.88	▼11.31
