= Aomori 3rd district =

Japan House of Representatives constituency

Aomori 3rd District
- Parliamentary constituency for the Japanese House of Representatives
- Numbered map of Aomori Prefecture single-member districts
- Prefecture: Aomori
- Proportional District: Tōhoku
- Electorate: 325,679 (2026)

Current constituency
- Seats: One
- Party: LDP
- Representative: Jiro Kimura
- Created from: Aomori's 1st "medium-sized" district

Aomori 3rd district is a single-member constituency of the House of Representatives in the national Diet of Japan. It is located in western Aomori Prefecture, the northernmost prefecture on Japan's main island of Honshu.

As of 2015, the district was home to 240,102 constituents.

== Areas covered ==
=== Current district ===
As of 5 January 2023, the areas covered by this district are as follows:

- Hirosaki
- Kuroishi
- Goshogawara
- Tsugaru
- Hirakawa
- Nishitsugaru District
- Nakatsugaru District
- Minamitsugaru District
- Kitatsugaru District

As a result of the abolition of Aomori's 4th district in 2017, this district moved to where the 4th district used to be and gained the town of Goshogawara and the district of Kitatsugaru from Aomori's 1st district, while Aomori's 2nd district absorbed the areas formerly belonging to the 3rd district.

=== Areas covered 2013–2017 ===
From redistricting in 2013 until the redistricting in 2017, the areas covered by this district were as follows:

- Hachinohe
- Sannohe District
  - Sannohe
  - Takko
  - Nanbu
  - Hashikami
  - Shingō

The only change was that the town of Gonohe in Sannohe district was moved to the 2nd district.

=== Areas covered before 2013 ===
From its formation in 1994 until its first redistricting in 2013, the areas covered by this district were as follows:

- Hachinohe
- Sannohe District

== Elected representatives ==
| Representative | Party | Years served | Notes |
|---|---|---|---|
| Tadamori Ōshima | LDP | 1996 - 2017 | Moved to the 2nd district |
| Jiro Kimura | LDP | 2017 - 2024 | |
| Hanako Okada | CDP | 2024 - 2026 | Failed to win a seat in the PR Block |
| Jiro Kimura | LDP | 2026 - | |

== Election results ==
2026
| Party | Candidate | Votes | % | ±% |
|---|---|---|---|---|
| LDP | Jiro Kimura | 83,547 | 52.3 | ▲10 |
| Centrist Reform | Hanako Okada | 67,604 | 42.3 | ▼7.3 |
| Reiwa | Wakako Sawara | 8,570 | 5.4 | |
| Registered electors | | 325,679 | | |
| Turnout | | 159,721 | 50.18 | ▼3.48 |
| LDP gain from Centrist Reform | | | | |

2024
| Party | Candidate | Votes | % | ±% |
|---|---|---|---|---|
| CDP | Hanako Okada | 86,593 | 49.6 | ▲14.6 |
| LDP | Jiro Kimura | 73,848 | 42.3 | ▼22.7 |
| Ishin | Jun'ya Nagasaka | 7,747 | 4.4 | |
| Independent | Toshikazu Sonota | 6,531 | 3.7 | |
| Registered electors | | 332,270 | | |
| Turnout | | | 53.66 | ▲0.37 |
| CDP gain from LDP | | | | |

2021
| Party | Candidate | Votes | % | ±% |
|---|---|---|---|---|
| LDP | Jiro Kimura | 118,230 | 65.0 | ▲0.8 |
| CDP | Takashi Yamauchi | 63,796 | 35.0 | ▲9.5 |
| Turnout | | | 53.29 | ▼2.73 |
| LDP hold | | | | |

2017
| Party | Candidate | Votes | % | ±% |
|---|---|---|---|---|
| LDP | Jiro Kimura | 128,740 | 64.2 | ▲13.0 |
| Kibō no Tō | Takashi Yamauchi | 51,096 | 25.5 | |
| JCP | Hiroaki Takayanagi | 16,510 | 8.2 | ▲1.9 |
| Happiness Realization | Yūki Mikuni | 4,115 | 2.1 | |
| Turnout | | | 56.02 | ▲7.15 |
| LDP hold | | | | |
