= Yamagata 3rd district =

Japan House of Representatives constituency

Yamagata 3rd District
- Parliamentary constituency for the Japanese House of Representatives
- Numbered map of Yamagata Prefecture single-member districts
- Prefecture: Yamagata
- Proportional District: Tohoku
- Electorate: 268,713

Current constituency
- Created: 1994
- Seats: One
- Party: Liberal Democratic
- Representative: Ayuko Kato
- Municipalities: Sakata, Shinjō, Tsuruoka, Akumi District, Higashitagawa District, and Mogami District

Yamagata 3rd district (山形県第3区, Yamagata-ken dai-sanku or simply 山形3区, Yamagata-sanku) is a single-member constituency of the House of Representatives in the national Diet of Japan located in Yamagata Prefecture.

== List of representatives ==
| Election | Representative | Party | Notes |
|---|---|---|---|
| 1996 | Riichiro Chikaoka | Liberal Democratic | |
| 2000 | Riichiro Chikaoka | Liberal Democratic | |
| 2003 | Koichi Kato | Independent | |
| 2005 | Koichi Kato | Liberal Democratic | |
| 2009 | Koichi Kato | Liberal Democratic | |
| 2012 | Juichi Abe | Independent | |
| 2014 | Ayuko Kato | Liberal Democratic | |
| 2017 | Ayuko Kato | Liberal Democratic | |
| 2021 | Ayuko Kato | Liberal Democratic | |
| 2024 | Ayuko Kato | Liberal Democratic | |
| 2026 | Ayuko Kato | Liberal Democratic | |

== Election results ==
2026
| Party | Candidate | Votes | % | ±% |
|---|---|---|---|---|
| Liberal Democratic | Ayuko Kato (Incumbent) | 90,730 | 58.2 | ▲2.1 |
| Centrist Reform | Takuma Ochiai | 32,432 | 20.8 | ▼16.9 |
| DPP | Kōsuke Kita | 21,972 | 14.1 | New |
| Sanseitō | Kazushi Endō | 10,770 | 6.9 | New |
| Registered electors | | 268,713 | | |
| Turnout | | 155,904 | 59.03 | ▼3.14 |
| LDP hold | | | | |

2024
| Party | Candidate | Votes | % | ±% |
|---|---|---|---|---|
| Liberal Democratic | Ayuko Kato (Incumbent) | 93,909 | 56.10 | ▼1.96 |
| CDP | Satoru Ishiguro | 63,102 | 37.70 | New |
| Communist | Mamoru Yamada | 10,372 | 6.20 | ▼0.27 |
| Registered electors | | 274,598 | | |
| Turnout | | 167,383 | 62.17 | ▼3.57 |
| LDP hold | | | | |

2021
| Party | Candidate | Votes | % | ±% |
|---|---|---|---|---|
| Liberal Democratic | Ayuko Kato (Incumbent) | 108,558 | 58.06 | |
| Independent | Hitomi Abe | 66,320 | 35.47 | New |
| Communist | Takeshi Umeki | 12,100 | 6.47 | |
| Registered electors | | 287,642 | | |
| Turnout | | | 65.74 | ▼1.01 |
| LDP hold | | | | |

2017
| Party | Candidate | Votes | % | ±% |
|---|---|---|---|---|
| Liberal Democratic | Ayuko Kato (Incumbent) | 103,973 | 52.18 | |
| Kibō no Tō | Juichi Abe | 81,708 | 41.01 | New |
| Communist | Taichi Kato | 11,241 | 5.64 | |
| Happiness Realization | Ryota Shirotori | 2,329 | 1.17 | |
| Registered electors | | 302,085 | | |
| Turnout | | | 66.75 | ▲4.79 |
| LDP hold | | | | |

2014
| Party | Candidate | Votes | % | ±% |
|---|---|---|---|---|
| Liberal Democratic | Ayuko Kato | 79,872 | 42.86 | |
| Independent | Juichi Abe (Incumbent) | 78,384 | 42.06 | |
| Democratic | Taisei Yoshida | 15,981 | 8.58 | |
| Communist | Tsuyoshi Hasegawa | 10,794 | 5.79 | |
| Independent | Makoto Sato | 1,319 | 0.71 | New |
| Registered electors | | 305,295 | | |
| Turnout | | | 61.96 | ▼3.36 |
| LDP gain from Independent | | | | |

2012
| Party | Candidate | Votes | % | ±% |
|---|---|---|---|---|
| Independent | Juichi Abe | 71,768 | 35.98 | New |
| Liberal Democratic | Koichi Kato (Incumbent) | 70,303 | 35.24 | |
| Restoration | Takeharu Sato | 25,299 | 12.68 | New |
| Social Democratic | Hideo Yoshiizumi (Incumbent-Tohoku PR block) | 22,930 | 11.50 | |
| Communist | Tsuyoshi Hasegawa | 9,170 | 4.60 | |
| Registered electors | | 311,172 | | |
| Turnout | | | 65.32 | ▼8.53 |
| Independent gain from LDP | | | | |

2009
| Party | Candidate | Votes | % | ±% |
|---|---|---|---|---|
| Liberal Democratic | Koichi Kato (Incumbent) | 130,502 | 56.86 | |
| Social Democratic | Hideo Yoshiizumi (elected by Tohoku PR block) | 80,362 | 35.01 | |
| Communist | Tsuyoshi Hasegawa | 13,789 | 6.01 | |
| Happiness Realization | Ryota Shirotori | 4,880 | 2.13 | New |
| Registered electors | | 318,892 | | |
| Turnout | | | 73.85 | ▲1.65 |
| LDP hold | | | | |

2005
| Party | Candidate | Votes | % | ±% |
|---|---|---|---|---|
| Liberal Democratic | Koichi Kato (Incumbent) | 159,486 | 69.58 | |
| Social Democratic | Hajime Sato | 49,057 | 21.40 | |
| Communist | Yoshio Misawa | 20,657 | 9.01 | |
| Registered electors | | 327,511 | | |
| Turnout | | | 72.20 | ▲0.11 |
| LDP hold | | | | |

2003
| Party | Candidate | Votes | % | ±% |
|---|---|---|---|---|
| Independent | Koichi Kato (endorsed by Liberal Democratic) | 137,206 | 58.92 | New |
| Democratic | Jun Saito (Incumbent-Yamagata 4th) | 84,946 | 34.20 | |
| Communist | Masayuki Sato | 10,735 | 4.61 | |
| Turnout | | | 72.09 | |
| Independent gain from LDP | | | | |

- Kato returned to the LDP after the election.

2000
| Party | Candidate | Votes | % | ±% |
|---|---|---|---|---|
| Liberal Democratic | Riichiro Chikaoka (Incumbent) | 88,069 | 57.22 | |
| Social Democratic | Shosuke Saito | 55,891 | 36.32 | |
| Communist | Mieko Kudo | 9,944 | 6.46 | |
| Turnout | | | | |
| LDP hold | | | | |

1996
| Party | Candidate | Votes | % | ±% |
|---|---|---|---|---|
| Liberal Democratic | Riichiro Chikaoka | 88,389 | 58.08 | New |
| Independent | Shosuke Saito | 54,640 | 35.90 | New |
| Communist | Koji Endo | 9,162 | 6.02 | New |
| Turnout | | | | |
