= Hirosaki University =

Japanese national university in Hirosaki, Aomori Prefecture, Japan

- 弘前大学
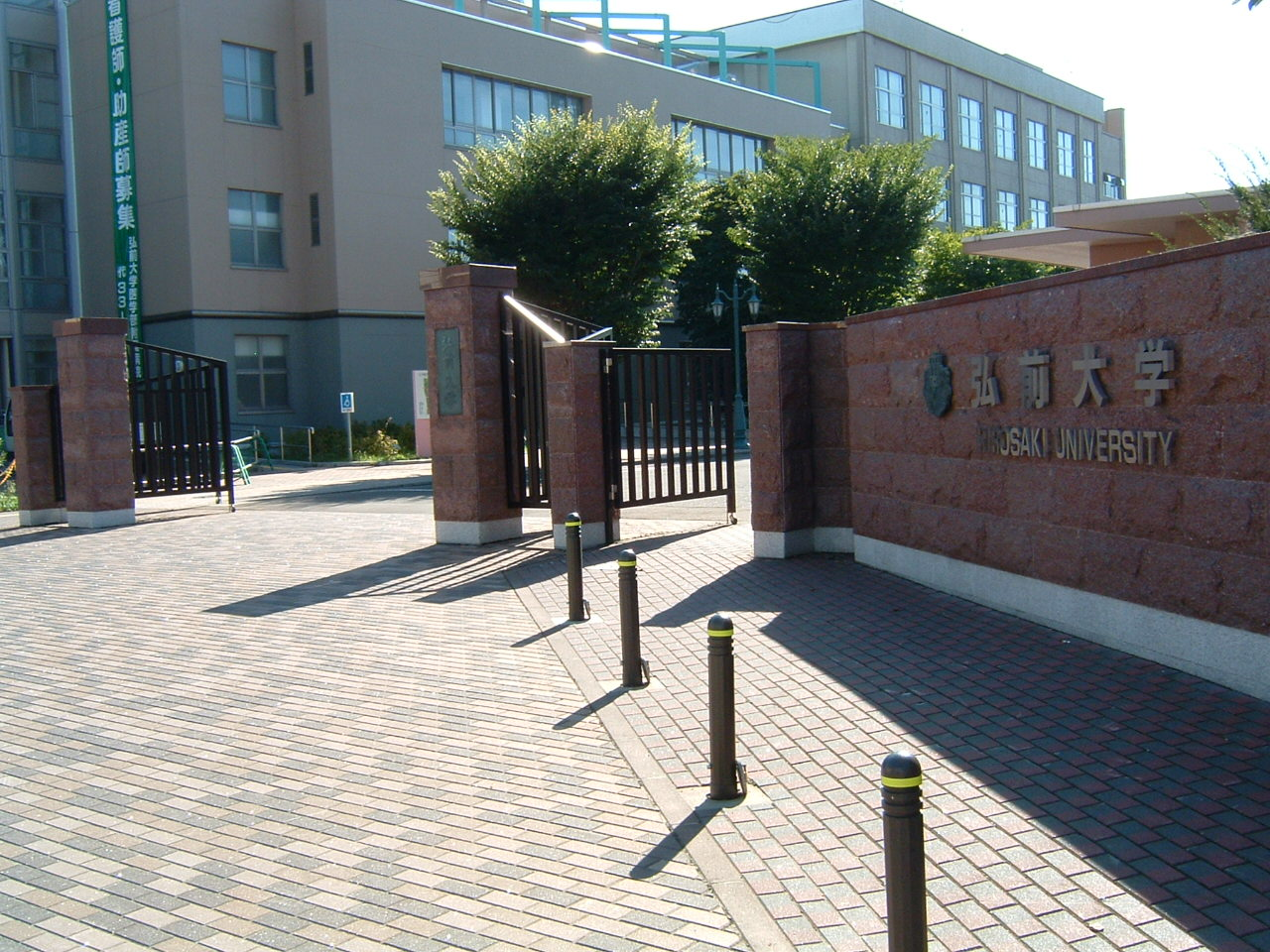
- Type: Public (National)
- Established: 1949
- President: Shinsaku Fukuda
- Faculty: 231 professors 214 associate professors 81 lecturers 167 research associates
- Administrative staff: 776
- Students: 6,792
- Undergraduates: 6,098
- Postgraduates: 694
- Location: Bunkyo-cho, Hirosaki, Aomori, Japan; 40°35′21″N 140°28′19″E
- Campus: Urban
- Nickname: HiroDai (弘大)
- Website: www.hirosaki-u.ac.jp

- Japan Aomori Prefecture

Hirosaki University (弘前大学, Hirosaki Daigaku) is a Japanese national university in Hirosaki, Aomori Prefecture, Japan. Established in 1949, it comprises five faculties: Faculty of the Humanities, Faculty of Education, Hirosaki University Medical School, Faculty of Science and Technology, and Faculty of Agriculture and Life Science. Its abbreviated form is Hirodai.

== History ==
Hirosaki University was officially founded in May 1949 as part of Japan's post-war educational reform, which sought to modernize and consolidate higher education across the country. The university was established by integrating five separate regional institutions located in Aomori Prefecture:

- Hirosaki High School (弘前高等学校, "Hirosaki Kōtō Gakkō"), founded in 1920 under the old Japanese educational system.

- Aomori Normal School (青森師範学校, "Aomori Shihan Gakkō"), dating back originally to 1875 and formally reorganized in 1943.

- Aomori Youth Normal School (青森青年師範学校, "Aomori Seinen Shihan Gakkō"), established in 1944.

- Hirosaki Medical College (弘前医科大学, "Hirosaki Ika Daigaku"), established in 1944.

- Aomori Medical School (青森医学専門学校, "Aomori Igaku Senmon Gakkō"), also established in 1944.

Hirosaki University holds a unique distinction among Japanese national universities: it is one of the very few institutions named after a city rather than its home prefecture, and specifically a city that is not the prefectural capital.

This layout was directly caused by the events of World War II. During the final months of the war, the prefectural capital of Aomori City suffered devastating air raids, which completely destroyed the facilities of both Aomori Normal School and Aomori Medical College. Because the historic castle town of Hirosaki was largely spared from the air raids, the surviving administrative faculties and local educators relocated their operations there. When the unified national university system was launched in 1949, the consolidated campus remained anchored in Hirosaki to ensure institutional stability.

At its inception in 1949, the university was organized into three core divisions: the Faculty of Arts and Science (Literature and Science), the Faculty of Education, and the Faculty of Medicine.

Over the following decades, the university adapted to changing regional and industrial demands through continuous academic restructuring:

- 1955: The specialized Agricultural Course, which originally belonged to the Faculty of Arts and Science, was detached to form the independent "Faculty of Agriculture".

- 1965: The broad Faculty of Arts and Science underwent a major division, separating into the "Faculty of Humanities" and the "Faculty of Science".

- 1997: Recognizing the shifting needs of technological innovation and modern ecological preservation, the science branches underwent a massive modernization phase. The Faculty of Science and the Faculty of Agriculture were formally reorganized into their current configurations: the "Faculty of Science and Technology" and the "Faculty of Agriculture and Life Science".

== Academics and admission ==
=== Semester Schedules ===
Hirosaki University operates on a two-semester system:

- First Semester (Spring): April to July.
- Second Semester (Fall): October to February.

Undergraduate and exchange students typically register for a full course load each term to fulfill degree or visa requirements.

=== Fees and Living Expenses ===
Tuition and fees at Hirosaki University follow the standard structure regulated by the Japanese Ministry of Education (MEXT). However, for part-time auditing students (credited auditors), a specialized per-subject fee structure applies:

- Application Fee: ¥9,800
- Admission Fee: ¥28,200
- Tuition Fee: ¥14,800 per subject/credit

For student housing, private apartments tailored for students are widely available within walking distance of the campuses. Average monthly rental costs around the university range between ¥25,000 and ¥30,000, making Hirosaki one of the most affordable national university towns in Japan regarding living expenses.

=== International Exchange Applications ===
Foreign exchange students applying to Hirosaki University must submit all required application paperwork compiled in either English or Japanese. Admission deadlines are strictly enforced according to the desired term of entry:

- For the First Semester (April Intake): Application deadline is November 20 of the preceding year.
- For the Second Semester (October Intake): Application deadline is April 20.

== Faculties ==
There are currently 7 faculties in the university:

Faculty	History
Faculty of the Humanities and Social Sciences	In April 1965, the Faculty of Humanities was founded.; In April 1980, within the Faculty of Humanities, the courses of Human Culture, Information Management and Social Systems were instituted.; In April 2005, the Course of Information Management was renamed the Course of Modern Sociology. Also, the Course of Social Systems was renamed the Course of Business Management and Economics.
Faculty of Education History	In 1949, the Department of Education was established and abolished in 1960.; In 1965, a Teacher-in-Charge of Health Education training course was established.; In 1966, an Educational Speciality Course was both established and abolished in 1994.; In 1973, a Kindergarten Teacher Training Course was established.; In 1978, the Teacher-in-Charge of Health Education program was renewed.; In 2000, a Special Nursing Educational Course was established.; Also in 2000, a School Education Teacher Training course, a Lifelong Education course, and a Special Nursing Teacher Training course were established.
Hirosaki University Medical School History	On May 31, 1949, Aomori Medical Vocational School and Hirosaki Medical School were combined and the Hirosaki University Medical school was established.; On April 1, 1951, 10 Basic studies/courses were inaugurated: Anatomy I, Anatomy II, Physiology, Biochemistry, Pathology I, Pathology II, Bacteriology, Pharmacology, Hygiene, Forensic Medicine. Also, 12 clinical chairs were created in the fields of: Internal Medicine I, Internal Medicine II, Pediatrics, Psychiatry, Surgery I, Surgery II, Orthopedics, Dermatology and Urology, Ophthalmology, Otolaryngology, Obstetrics and Gynecology, and Radiology.; On April 1, 1953, the Physiology Department was separated into Physiology I and Physiology II.; The following courses were added on April 1: Anesthesiology (1965); Parasitology (1966); Oral Surgery (1979)
Faculty of Science and Technology	In April 1965, the Department of Literature and Science was separated into separate departments of Literature and Science.; In April 1969, Science major was established, but it was abolished in 1978.; In April 1976, the Department of Earth Science was added.; In April 1977, Earthquake and Volcano Observatory was attached to The Department of Science.; In November 1985, the Data Processing Center was created.; In April 1987, the Department of Informational Science was established.; In June 1994, the Synthesized Data Processing Center was set up.; In October 1997, the Department of Science and Agriculture were reorganized into the Department of Science and Engineering.; In April 2006, the Department of Science and Technology was established in its present style.
Faculty of Agriculture and Life Science	In April 1951, the Agricultural Department was organized within the Department of Literature and Science.; In March 1955, the Agriculture Department within the Department of Literature and Science was abolished.; In July 1955, the Faculty of Agricultural was established.; In April 1956, a farm attached to the Agricultural Department was established.; In April 1960, the Agriculture Exclusive Research course was established and abolished in April 1963.; In April 1963, the courses Horticulture and Chemistry and Agriculture were established in the Faculty of Agriculture.; In April 1966, Agriculture and Engineering was established in the Faculty of Agriculture.; In April 1969, Horticulture was established within the Faculty of Agriculture.; In April 1971, Graduate School of Agriculture, a graduate course, was established.; In April 1990, due to the reorganization of the Faculty of Agricultural, Biological Resource Science, Agricultural Industrial Science and Agricultural System Engineering Course were established.; In April 1993, Gene Laboratory was opened.; In October 1997, Faculty of Agriculture changed into the Faculty of Agriculture and Biological Science.; In October 1999, Research Laboratory for Radioisotopes was established.; In April 2000, Accessory Farm was renamed to Teaching and Research Center for Bio-coexistence due to a reorganization.; In April 2002, The United Graduate School of Agriculture was changed into The United Graduate School of Agriculture and Life Science.; In April 2008, Bio-functional Science, Biochemistry and Biotechnology, Bio-Production and Regional Environmental Science programs were established in the Faculty of Agriculture and Life Science.

== Student life ==
=== Club activities ===
There are many clubs for all students to join as well as specific clubs only for medical students. Medical students can join any club, but other students can only join clubs that are open to all students.

=== International exchange students ===
Hirosaki University has about 110 international students from various universities and colleges around the world. The International Exchange Center is an organization of Hirosaki University, which purpose is to make their international students do better in their studies.

Consequently, the university has a Home Visit Program which lets families in Hirosaki to accept or sponsor exchange students. There is also an English Lounge for students to practice and improve English while they study in Japan.

In addition, the university is having courses for foreign students to learn Japanese Culture, Economy and Management. If the students have high Japanese skill, they can also study with Japanese students. However, the exchange student with Japanese skills must get the permission of teacher of the class first.

=== Campus activities ===
Hirosaki University's School Festival is held in October every year. The students and clubs set up booths to sell things or share their interests. A main event is also held, which is a concert performed by students. On the other hand, food is sold in dozens of booths around the campus. In 2010, around 7200 people visited the festival.

== Residences ==
=== Commuting and transportation ===
Commuting

There are those who commute to Hirosaki University. In Hirosaki, trains may only come once per an hour, so it can be inconvenient for students to commute to school: if they miss the train, they must wait another hour for the next train to come. Also, trains run slowly, so few students living in other prefectures outside of Aomori Prefecture commute daily to Hirosaki University.

Transportation

There are buses on a circular route in the city and there are a few bus stops in front of Hirosaki University. The Gakuencho and Oguriyama Oinomori lines provide service to the university.

The nearest train stations are:

- Hirosaki Station: located on the Ou and Konan lines, which takes 20 minutes on foot to reach the university.
- Hirokōshita Station: located on the Owani line, which takes 10 minutes on foot to reach the university.

=== Housing ===
Dormitories

There are three dorms near Hirosaki University: Hokuou-ryo, Hokumei-ryo and Hou-ryo (-ryo means "dormitory"). Each of the dorms has about 100 rooms. Hou-ryo is for women only, while the others are for men. Hou-ryo and Hokuou-ryo are both five-story buildings that are located in the Gakuen district, about 1.5 km from Hirosaki University. On the other hand, Hokumei-ryo is a four-story building in the Midorigaoka district with. In each dormitory, there are two students who can occupy one room. There is also a lounge, kitchen, and toilet on each floor. In addition, a public bath and dining room are on 1st floor. Students can take a meal every morning and evening except on Sunday during school terms.

Apartments

There are many apartments near Hirosaki University. Students decide where to live based on the style of the house, rent, area and so on.

Boarding houses

As a general rule, there are two common things concerning boarding house: those who live in boarding houses are provided with meals daily, and the use of public facilities such as public baths, with other inhabitants.

== Notable alumni ==
The school's notable alumni include:

=== Under the old system of Hirosaki High School (1920–1950) ===
- Seijun Suzuki (1923–2017): A film director. He directed many films such as Branded to Kill.
- Osamu Dazai (1909–1948): A novelist whose real name is Shuji Tsushima. His works include Disqualified person, Tsugaru, Shayou, and Run Meros.

=== The Hirosaki University (1949–present) ===
- Tadahiro Nomura (1974–): A Judoka of 60 kg or less class who won three Olympic gold medals in 1996, 2000, 2004. He entered Graduate School of Medicine in 2009. He also learned Sports and Health Science.
- Ayumi Tanimoto (1981–): A Judoka who won the women's –63 category gold medal at the Athens Olympic Games in 2004 and at the Beijing Olympic Games in 2008. She entered Hirosaki Graduate School in Medical Researches in 2009.
- Yoshikazu Yasuhiko (1947–): An animator and manga artist, best known for Mobile Suit Gundam (1979–1980). He started attending Hirosaki University in 1966 and became a leader in the Zenkyōtō movement. He was expelled in 1969 after being arrested on suspicion of breaking and entering into the university.
