= Nobuhide Minorikawa =

Japanese politician

- 御法川 信英
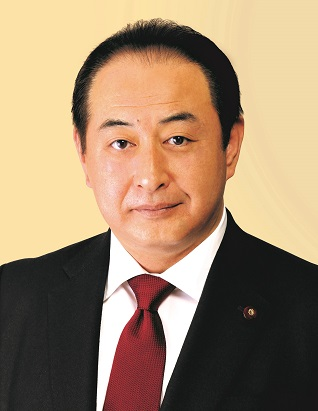
- Official portrait, 2019

Member of the House of Representatives
- Incumbent
- Assumed office 16 December 2012
- Preceded by: Kimiko Kyono
- Constituency: Akita 3rd (2012–2024); Tohoku PR (2024–present)
- In office 9 November 2003 – 21 July 2009
- Preceded by: Kenzo Muraoka
- Succeeded by: Kimiko Kyono
- Constituency: Akita 3rd

Personal details
- Born: 25 May 1964 (age 62) Daisen, Akita, Japan
- Party: Liberal Democratic
- Other political affiliations: Independent (2003–2004)
- Parent: Hidefumi Minorikawa (father)
- Education: Keio University; Columbia University

Nobuhide Minorikawa (御法川 信英, Minorikawa Nobuhide; born 25 May 1964) is a Japanese politician of the Liberal Democratic Party (LDP), serving as a member of the House of Representatives in the Diet (national legislature). A native of Ōmagari, Akita, he attended Keio University and received a master's degree from the School of International and Public Affairs at Columbia University in the United States. He was elected to the House of Representatives for the first time in 2003 as an independent and joined the LDP in the following year.
