= Shizuoka 1st district =

Electoral district in Japan

Shizuoka 1st District
- 静岡県第1区
- Parliamentary constituency for the Japanese House of Representatives
- Numbered map of Shizuoka Prefecture single-member districts
- Proportional District: Tōkai
- Electorate: 386,430 (September 2022)

Current constituency
- Created: 1994
- Seats: One
- Party: LDP

Shizuoka 1st district (Japanese: 静岡県第1区) is a single-member electoral district for the House of Representatives, the lower house of the National Diet of Japan. The district is located in Shizuoka city and covers the wards of Aoi and Suruga. It is currently represented by former Minister of Justice, Yōko Kamikawa.

== List of representatives ==
Election	Representative	Party	Notes
1996	Yoshinori Oguchi	New Frontier	Ran for Komeito in 2000, but failed re-election.
2000	Yōko Kamikawa	Independent	
2003	Seishū Makino	Democratic	
2005	Yōko Kamikawa	Liberal Democratic	
2009	Seishū Makino	Democratic	
2012	Yōko Kamikawa	Liberal Democratic	
2014	Yōko Kamikawa	Liberal Democratic	
2017	Yōko Kamikawa	Liberal Democratic	
2021	Yōko Kamikawa	Liberal Democratic	
2024	Yōko Kamikawa	Liberal Democratic	
2026	Yōko Kamikawa	Liberal Democratic	

== Election results ==
2026
Party	Candidate	Votes	%	±%
LDP	Yōko Kamikawa	127,488	61.15	▲4.34
DPP	Shohei Shibata	61,490	29.49	
JCP	Setsuko Suzuki	19,516	9.36	▲2.6
Registered electors		377,866		
Turnout		208,494	56.89	▲2.90
LDP hold				

2024
Party	Candidate	Votes	%	±%
LDP	Yōko Kamikawa	114,278	56.8	▲4.4
CDP	Miho Takahashi	43,375	23.6	▼3.8
Ishin	Kōki Yamashita	22,239	11.1	▲2.1
JCP	Setsuko Suzuki	13,593	6.8	
Independent	Yoshihiro Suzuki	3,675	1.8	
Registered electors		380,890		
Turnout			53.99	▲3.00
LDP hold				

2021
Party	Candidate	Votes	%	±%
Liberal Democratic	Yōko Kamikawa (Incumbent)	101,868	52.35	
CDP	Yukihiro Endo	53,974	27.74	New
DPP	Miho Takahashi	21,074	10.83	New
Innovation	Masayuki Aoyama (Incumbent-Tōkai PR block)	17,667	9.08	New
Registered electors		387,132		
Turnout			50.99	▼2.52
LDP hold				

2017
Party	Candidate	Votes	%	±%
Liberal Democratic	Yōko Kamikawa (Incumbent)	96,500	46.88	
Kibō no Tō	Masanari Koike	56,086	27.25	New
CDP	Masayuki Aoyama (elected by Tōkai PR block)	38,531	18.72	New
Communist	Chika Suzuki	14,732	7.16	
Registered electors		391,598		
Turnout			53.51	▲0.60
LDP hold				

2014
Party	Candidate	Votes	%	±%
Liberal Democratic	Yōko Kamikawa (Incumbent)	89,544	44.90	
Innovation	Masanari Koike (Incumbent-Tōkai PR block)	47,986	24.06	New
Democratic	Seishū Makino	45,238	22.68	
Communist	Sachiyo Kawase	16,682	8.36	
Registered electors		385,176		
Turnout			52.91	▼6.88
LDP hold				

2012
Party	Candidate	Votes	%	±%
Liberal Democratic	Yōko Kamikawa	81,278	36.18	
Democratic	Seishū Makino (Incumbent)	53,773	23.94	
Restoration	Takeshi Ozaki	41,479	18.47	New
Your	Masanari Koike (elected by Tōkai PR block)	34,457	15.34	
Communist	Sachiyo Kawase	13,646	6.07	
Registered electors		384,803		
Turnout			59.79	▼7.78
LDP gain from Democratic				

2009
Party	Candidate	Votes	%	±%
Democratic	Seishū Makino	120,904	47.29	
Liberal Democratic	Yōko Kamikawa (Incumbent)	96,096	37.59	
Your	Tsuyoshi Sato	21,285	8.33	New
Communist	Motoaki Ikeno	14,293	5.59	
Happiness Realization	Yuta Nakano	3,071	1.20	New
Registered electors		384,117		
Turnout			67.57	▲0.55
Democratic gain from LDP				

2005
Party	Candidate	Votes	%	±%
Liberal Democratic	Yōko Kamikawa (Incumbent-Tōkai PR block)	99,702	39.49	
Independent	Nobuhiro Tanabe	69,111	27.38	
Democratic	Seishū Makino (Incumbent)	67,560	26.76	
Communist	Motoaki Ikeno	16,077	6.37	
Registered electors		382,322		
Turnout			67.02	▲6.64
LDP gain from Democratic				

2003
Party	Candidate	Votes	%	±%
Democratic	Seishū Makino (Incumbent-Tōkai PR block)	74,745	33.48	
Liberal Democratic	Yōko Kamikawa (Incumbent) (elected by Tōkai PR block)	67,437	30.21	
Independent	Nobuhiro Tanabe	59,937	26.85	New
Communist	Sachiyo Kawase	15,032	6.73	
Social Democratic	Satoshi Ishizuka	6,093	2.73	New
Registered electors		379,980		
Turnout			60.38	▼4.48
Democratic gain from LDP				

2000
Party	Candidate	Votes	%	±%
Independent	Yōko Kamikawa	58,358	24.23	
Democratic	Seishū Makino (elected by Tōkai PR block)	57,786	23.99	New
Komeito	Yoshinori Oguchi (Incumbent)	55,976	23.24	New
Liberal Democratic	Shinya Totsuka	43,734	18.16	
Communist	Yukihiro Shimazu	23,674	9.83	
Liberal League	Mitsuyuki Asano	1,327	0.55	New
Registered electors		376,886		
Turnout			64.86	▲2.62
Independent gain from Komeito				

- Kamikawa joined the LDP after the election.

1996
Party	Candidate	Votes	%	±%
New Frontier	Yoshinori Oguchi	48,650	21.52	New
Liberal Democratic	Shinya Totsuka	37,061	16.39	New
Independent	Shingo Amano	35,642	15.76	New
Democratic	Seishū Makino	28,987	12.82	New
Independent	Yōko Kamikawa	26,828	11.86	New
Communist	Tsuneo Sugiyama	18,496	8.18	New
Independent	Hirotsugu Matsunaga	15,526	6.87	New
Independent	Takeshi Kimiya	14,925	6.60	New
Turnout				

== See also ==
- List of districts of the House of Representatives of Japan
