= Yoshitami Kameoka =

Japanese politician (born 1955)

- 亀岡 偉民
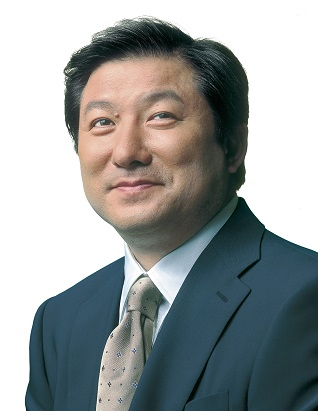
- Official portrait, 2020

Member of the House of Representatives
- In office 16 December 2012 – 9 October 2024
- Preceded by: Yosaburo Ishihara
- Succeeded by: Multi-member district
- Constituency: Fukushima 1st (2012–2017); Tohoku PR (2017–2024)
- In office 11 September 2005 – 21 July 2009
- Preceded by: Tatsuo Sato
- Succeeded by: Yosaburo Ishihara
- Constituency: Fukushima 1st

Personal details
- Born: 10 September 1955 (age 71) Kokubunji, Tochigi, Japan
- Party: Liberal Democratic
- Education: Waseda University

Yoshitami Kameoka (亀岡 偉民, Kameoka Yoshitami; born 10 September 1955) is a former Japanese politician of the Liberal Democratic Party, who served as a member of the House of Representatives in the Diet (national legislature). A native of Tochigi Prefecture and graduate of Waseda University, he was elected for the first time in 2005 after unsuccessful runs in 2000 and 2003.
