= Zenkichi =

- Pronunciation: dzeNkʲitɕi (IPA)
- Gender: Male

Origin
- Origin: Japanese
- Meaning: Different meanings depending on the kanji used

Other names
- Alternative spelling: Zenkiti (Kunrei-shiki) Zenkiti (Nihon-shiki) Zenkichi (Hepburn)

Zenkichi is a masculine Japanese given name.

== Written forms ==
Zenkichi can be written using different combinations of kanji characters. Here are some examples:

- 善吉, "virtuous, good luck"
- 全吉 "all, good luck"
- 然吉, "so, good luck"

The name can also be written in hiragana ぜんきち or katakana ゼンキチ.

== Notable people with the name ==
- Zenkichi Kojima (小嶋 善吉; born 1947), Japanese politician

== Fictional characters ==
- Zenkichi Hitoyoshi (人吉 善吉), protagonist of the manga series Medaka Box
- Zenkichi Hasegawa (長谷川 善吉), a character in the video game Persona 5 Strikers
