= Tatsuo Sato =

Tatsuo Sato is the name of:

- Tatsuo Sato (politician) (佐藤 剛男; 1937–2013), Japanese politician of the Liberal Democratic Party
- Tatsuo Satō (director) (佐藤 竜雄; 1964–2026), Japanese anime director
