= Emi Kaneko =

Japanese politician (born 1965)

- 金子 恵美
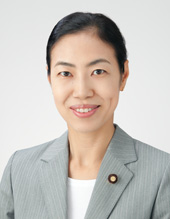
- Official portrait, 2012

Member of the House of Representatives
- Incumbent
- Assumed office 19 December 2014
- Constituency: Tohoku PR (2014–2017); Fukushima 1st (2017–2026); Tohoku PR (2026–present)

Member of the House of Councillors
- In office 29 July 2007 – 28 July 2013
- Preceded by: Hiroko Wada
- Succeeded by: Masako Mori
- Constituency: Fukushima at-large

Member of the Date City Council
- In office 2006–2007

Member of the Hobara Town Council
- In office 2000–2006

Personal details
- Born: 7 July 1965 (age 61) Date, Fukushima, Japan
- Party: DRP (2026–present)
- Other political affiliations: Independent (2000–2007; 2018–2020); DPJ (2007–2016); DP (2016–2018); CDP (2020–2026); CRA (2026)
- Parent: Tokunosuke Kaneko (father)
- Education: Hosei University; California State University, Fresno; Fukushima University

Emi Kaneko (金子 恵美, Kaneko Emi; born 7 July 1965) is a Japanese politician of the Centrist Reform Alliance, who serves as a member of the House of Representatives in the Diet. A native of Fukushima Prefecture, she did her undergraduate study at Hosei University and later earned master's degrees from California State University, Fresno and Fukushima University. After serving in the town assembly of Hobara, Fukushima for two terms and the city assembly of Date, Fukushima. In 2007, she was elected to the House of Councillors in Fukushima at-large district but she lost reelection 2013. Since 2014 she has been a member of the House of Representatives, representing Fukushima Prefecture.

Kaneko was part of the CDP's shadow cabinet 'Next Cabinet' as the shadow Minister of Agriculture, Forestry and Fisheries.
