= Goji Sakamoto =

Japanese politician

- 坂本 剛二
- Official portrait, 2003

Member of the House of Representatives
- In office 19 December 2012 – 21 November 2014
- Preceded by: Izumi Yoshida
- Succeeded by: Masayoshi Yoshino
- Constituency: Fukushima 5th
- In office 19 February 1990 – 21 July 2009
- Preceded by: Naoki Tanaka
- Succeeded by: Multi-member district
- Constituency: Fukushima 3rd (1990–1996); Fukushima 5th (1996–2000); Tohoku PR (2000–2003); Fukushima 5th (2003–2005); Tohoku PR (2005–2009)

Member of the Fukushima Prefectural Assembly
- In office 1975–1990

Member of the Iwaki City Assembly
- In office 1972–1975

Personal details
- Born: 2 November 1944 Iwaki, Fukushima, Japan
- Died: 4 November 2018 (aged 74) Hitachi, Ibaraki, Japan
- Party: Liberal Democratic
- Other political affiliations: NFP (1994–1998); Independent (1998–1999)
- Children: Ryutaro Sakamoto
- Relatives: Teruhiko Mashiko (brother-in-law)
- Education: Chuo University

Goji Sakamoto (坂本 剛二, Sakamoto Gōji; 2 November 1944 – 4 November 2018) was a Japanese politician of the Liberal Democratic Party, a member of the House of Representatives in the Diet (national legislature). A native of Iwaki, Fukushima and graduate of Chuo University, he had served in the city assembly of Iwaki since 1972 and in the assembly of Fukushima Prefecture for three terms since 1975. In 1986, he ran unsuccessfully for the House of Representatives. He ran again four years later and was elected for the first time. He died on 4 November 2018 at the age of 74 from heart failure.
