= Eisaku =

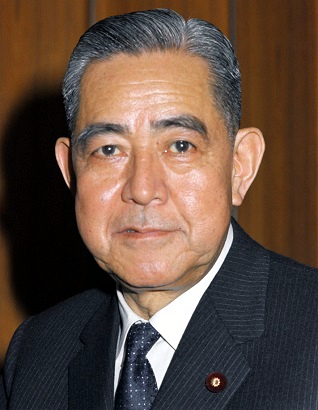
- eisaku Sato the 61st 62nd and 63rd prime minister of Japan (1964-1972)
- Gender: Male

Origin
- Origin: Japanese
- Meaning: Different meanings depending on the kanji used

Eisaku (written: 英作, 英策, 榮作 or 栄佐久) is a masculine Japanese given name. Notable people with the name include:

- Eisaku Kubonouchi (窪之内 英策; born 1966), Japanese manga artist
- Eisaku Satō (佐藤 榮作; 1901–1975), Japanese politician and Prime Minister of Japan
- Eisaku Satō (governor) (佐藤 栄佐久; born 1939), Japanese politician
- Eisaku Tomioka (富岡 英作; born 1964), Japanese shogi player
- Wada Eisaku (和田 英作; 1874–1959), Japanese painter
- Eisaku Yoshida (吉田 栄作; born 1969), Japanese actor and singer
