= Masako Mori (politician) =

Japanese politician (born 1964)

- 森 まさこ
- Official portrait, 2021

Minister of Justice
- In office 31 October 2019 – 16 September 2020
- Prime Minister: Shinzo Abe
- Preceded by: Katsuyuki Kawai
- Succeeded by: Yōko Kamikawa

Minister of State for Consumer Affairs and Food Safety
- In office 26 December 2012 – 3 September 2014
- Prime Minister: Shinzo Abe
- Preceded by: Tadamasa Kodaira
- Succeeded by: Haruko Arimura

Member of the House of Councillors
- Incumbent
- Assumed office 29 July 2007
- Preceded by: Toyoaki Ōta
- Constituency: Fukushima at-large

Personal details
- Born: Masako Mori; 22 August 1964 (age 62) Iwaki, Fukushima, Japan
- Party: Liberal Democratic
- Children: 3
- Education: Tohoku University
- Occupation: Lawyer • Politician

Masako Mori (森 まさこ, Mori Masako; born 22 August 1964) is a Japanese politician and lawyer who has served in the House of Councillors since 2007, and as Minister of Justice from October 2019 to September 2020. She is a member of the Liberal Democratic Party.

== Early life ==
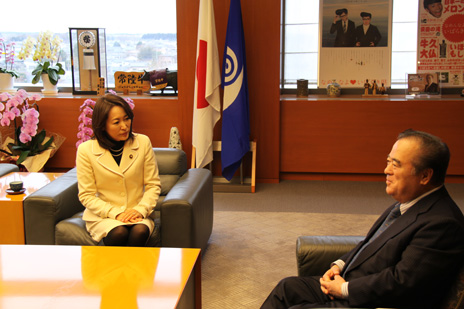
Mori with Masaru Hashimoto in 2014

Masako Mori was born on 22 August 1964, to an impoverished family in Fukushima Prefecture. She decided to pursue a career as a lawyer after her father, who had lost his entire fortune, was saved by a lawyer. She graduated from Tohoku University in 1988. After working in a legal cram school, she passed the Japanese bar examination on her fifth attempt, and qualified as an attorney at law in 1995.

After three years practicing consumer rights law, she was selected for a Japan Federation of Bar Associations scholarship to study in the United States. She was a visiting fellow at the New York University School of Law starting in 1999. Following the birth of her second child in 2002, and her husband being transferred to a position in the United States for two years, she left law practice to become a housewife.

In 2005, she joined the Financial Services Agency, where she served as a deputy director and financial inspector.

== Political career ==
Mori resigned from the Financial Services Agency in 2006 to run for governor of Fukushima Prefecture following the resignation of Eisaku Sato. She lost this election to Yuhei Sato.

She won a seat in the 2007 House of Councillors election, and served as vice chairwoman of the LDP's judicial committee and chairwoman of the Upper House Committee on Oversight of Administration. Following the March 2011 Tohoku earthquake and tsunami, she put great effort in trying to restore the damaged territories of her native Tohoku region.

Following the LDP's victory in the 2012 general election, Mori was named to the second Cabinet of Prime Minister Shinzo Abe as Minister of State for the Declining Birthrate and consumer affairs.

She was re-elected in the 2013 election, and held her seat in a three-way race in the July 2019 election, during which she campaigned to decommission all nuclear reactors in Fukushima Prefecture.

=== Minister of Justice ===
Mori was appointed Minister of Justice in October 2019 after the resignation of Katsuyuki Kawai, who had been involved in a campaign finance scandal.

In December 2019, Masako Mori confirmed Wei Wei's death sentence for murder.

After former Nissan chairman Carlos Ghosn escaped from Japan while awaiting trial on criminal charges, Mori publicly stated that he should "prove his innocence", but later retracted the comment and apologized. She also defended Japanese interrogation and detention practices against public criticism.

In February 2020, she defended the Cabinet's decision to delay the retirement of top Tokyo prosecutor Hiromu Kurokawa, which the opposition criticized as illegal.

In March 2020, she apologized and retracted a comment accusing public prosecutors of fleeing from her home city of Iwaki before evacuation orders were issued amid the 2011 Tōhoku earthquake and tsunami.

== Personal life ==
Her legal name is Masako Miyoshi (三好 雅子, Miyoshi Masako), but she is professionally known by her maiden surname of Mori.

Political offices
Preceded by Katsuyuki Kawai	Minister of Justice; 2019–2020	Succeeded by Yōko Kamikawa
