= 2023 Shizuoka mayoral election =

- 9 April 2023
- Turnout: 44.62%▼3.15%
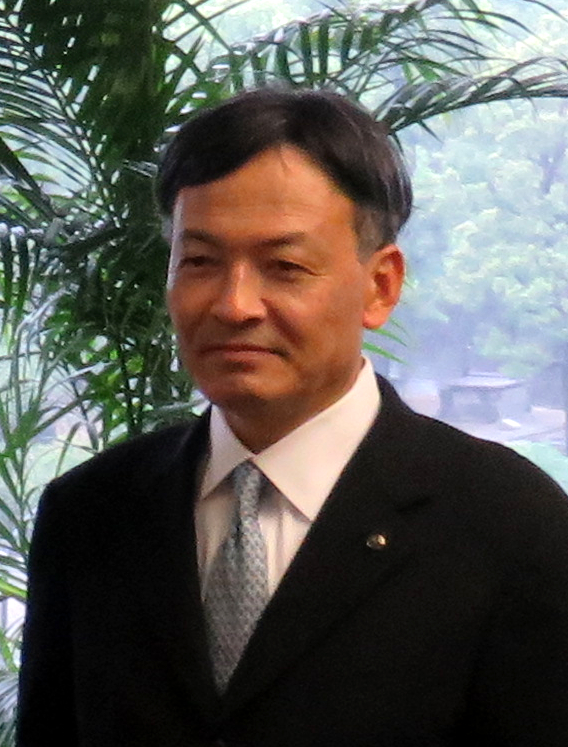

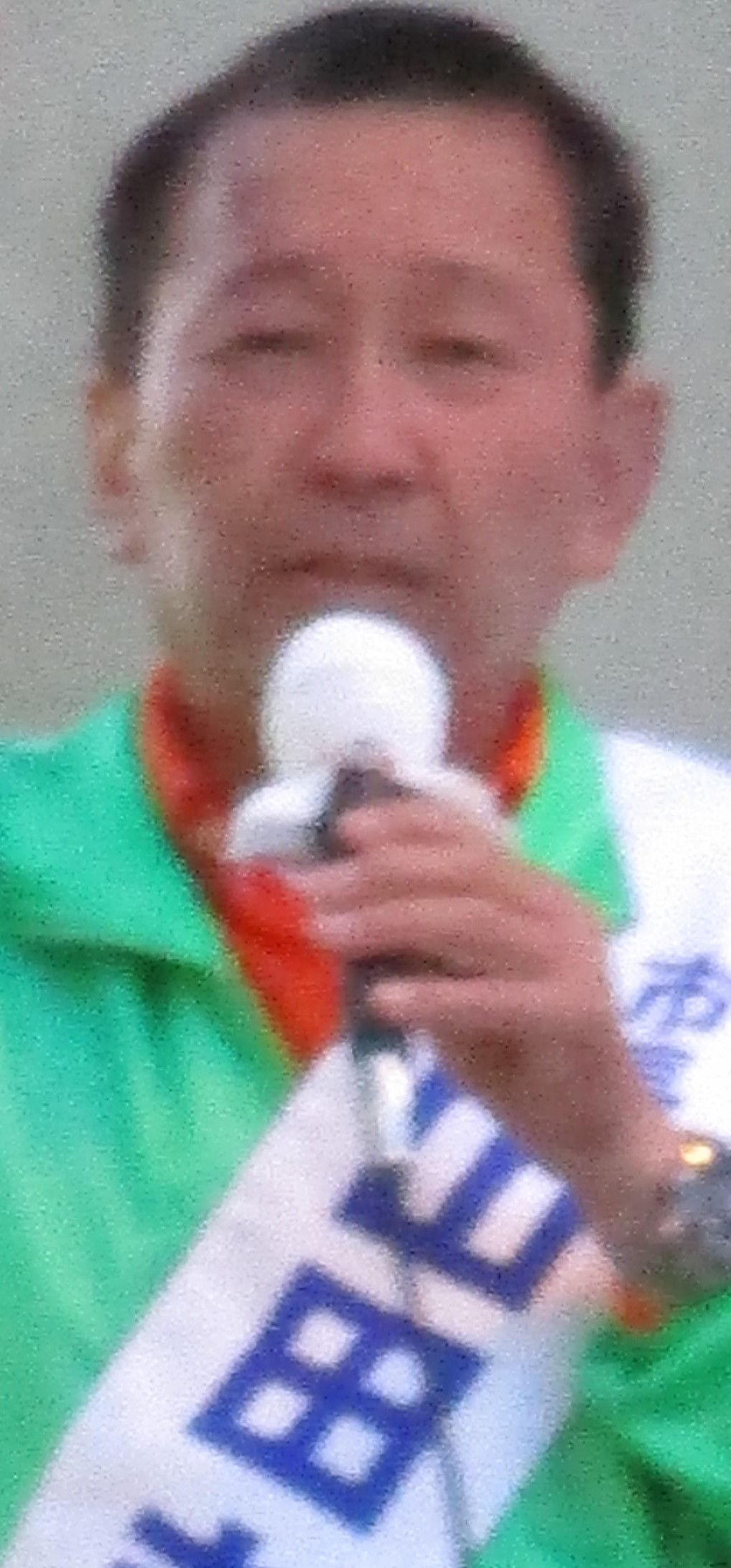
Candidate	Takashi Namba	Makoto Yamada	Chika Suzuki
Party	Independent	Independent	JCP
Popular vote	149,117	80,829	27,197
Percentage	57.99%	31.43%	10.58%
Supported by	LDP, NKP, CDP, DPP
Mayor before election
Nobuhiro Tanabe
Independent
Elected mayor
Takashi Namba
Independent

The 2023 Shizuoka Mayoral Election was held on 9 April 2023, to elect the new mayor of Shizuoka. It was held as part of the 2023 Japanese unified local elections. The election saw newcomer candidate Takashi Namba, emerging victorious. Despite three major candidates running, Namba secured 57.99% of the vote.

Support for Namba came from across the political aisle. Being supported by the Liberal Democratic Party of Japan, Komeito, Constitutional Democratic Party of Japan, and the Democratic Party for the People. Despite this widespread party support, he would face steep competition from another independent candidate by the name of Makoto Yamada, and Japanese Communist Party member Chika Suzuki.

== Results ==
=== By ward ===
Ward	Takashi Namba Independent		Makoto Yamada Independent		Chika Suzuki JCP	
Ward	#	%	#	%	#	%
Suruga Ward	42,327	57.38%	23,627	32.03%	7,806	10.58%
Aoi Ward	48,240	50.02%	37,069	38.44%	11,135	11.55%
Shimizu Ward	58,550	67.35%	20,133	23.16%	8,256	9.50%
