= Mitsuhide Iwaki =

Japanese politician

- 岩城 光英
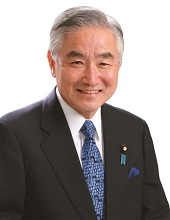
- Official portrait, 2015

Minister of Justice
- In office 7 October 2015 – 3 August 2016
- Prime Minister: Shinzo Abe
- Preceded by: Yōko Kamikawa
- Succeeded by: Katsutoshi Kaneda

Deputy Chief Cabinet Secretary (Political affairs, House of Councillors)
- In office 27 August 2007 – 24 September 2008
- Prime Minister: Shinzo Abe; Yasuo Fukuda
- Preceded by: Seiji Suzuki
- Succeeded by: Yoshitada Konoike

Member of the House of Councillors
- In office 26 July 1998 – 25 July 2016
- Preceded by: Shizuo Satō
- Succeeded by: Teruhiko Mashiko
- Constituency: Fukushima at-large

Mayor of Iwaki
- In office 20 October 1990 – 27 September 1997
- Preceded by: Takeo Nakata
- Succeeded by: Keisuke Shike

Member of the Fukushima Prefectural Assembly
- In office 1986–1990
- Constituency: Iwaki City

Member of the Iwaki City Assembly
- In office 1980–1986

Personal details
- Born: 4 December 1949 (age 76) Iwaki, Fukushima, Japan
- Party: Liberal Democratic
- Education: Sophia University

Mitsuhide Iwaki (岩城 光英, Iwaki Mitsuhide; born 4 December 1949) is a Japanese politician of the Liberal Democratic Party, a member of the House of Councillors in the National Diet (national legislature). A native of Iwaki, Fukushima and graduate of Sophia University with a B.L., he worked at Suntory and served in the city assembly of Iwaki for two terms since 1980, in the assembly of Fukushima Prefecture for two terms from 1986 and as mayor of Iwaki for two terms from 1990. He was elected to the House of Councillors for the first time in 1998.

Iwaki was named Minister of Justice in Shinzo Abe cabinet on 7 October 2015.

== Conservative views ==
Iwaki is a member of the Sinseiren parliamentary group (fundamentalist Shinto).

On 18 October 2015, a few days after joining Shinzo Abe's cabinet, Iwaki visited the controversial Yasukuni Shrine.

Political offices
Preceded by Yōko Kamikawa	Minister of Justice; 2015–2016	Succeeded by Katsutoshi Kaneda
