= Hiromu Kurokawa =

Japanese prosecutor

- 黒川 弘務
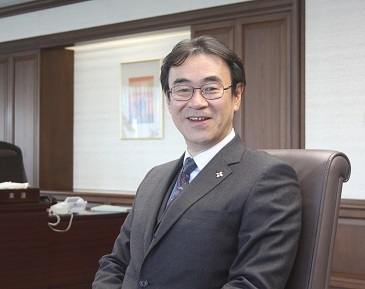

Head of the Tokyo High Public Prosecutors Office
- In office January 18, 2019 – May 22, 2020

Personal details
- Born: February 8, 1957 (age 69)
- Education: University of Tokyo

Hiromu Kurokawa (黒川 弘務 Kurokawa Hiromu; born February 8, 1957) is a Japanese prosecutor who served as chief of the Tokyo High Public Prosecutors Office from January 2019 to May 2020. The extension of his term of office by Prime Minister Shinzo Abe in February 2020, followed by his resignation for misconduct in May 2020, sparked political controversy in Japan.

== Early life ==
Kurokawa was born in Tokyo and graduated from the University of Tokyo Faculty of Law in 1981. He completed legal training in 1983 and thereafter worked as a prosecutor in various posts throughout Japan.

== Roles under Shinzo Abe government ==
Japan's highest prosecutor, the Prosecutor-General, customarily serves for two-year terms. Kurokawa and Makoto Hayashi were known as the two best prosecutors of their class, and were considered leading contenders to become Prosecutor-General as of the mid-2010s. However, Kurokawa was promoted to Vice-Minister of Justice in September 2016, placing him in a coordination role with senior Cabinet members such as Chief Cabinet Secretary Yoshihide Suga, while Hayashi was placed in charge of the prosecutors' office in Nagoya.

Kurokawa was the top bureaucrat in the Justice Ministry during the investigation of Moritomo Gakuen, a private school that was embroiled in a scandal surrounding a purchase of land from the government. Shukan Bunshun reported in December 2018 that Kurokawa helped to quash the investigation despite the top prosecutor in Osaka wanting to pursue indictment.

Kurokawa was appointed Head of the Tokyo High Public Prosecutors Office in January 2019, at the initiative of former Justice Minister and prosecutor Takashi Yamashita. At the time, authorities saw Hayashi as the most likely candidate for next Prosecutor-General, as Kurokawa's mandatory retirement would come at the age of 63 in February 2020, months before incumbent Prosecutor-General Nobuo Inada's scheduled retirement in July, which coincided with Hayashi's turning 63. According to a Nikkei report, the government came to consider appointing both Kurokawa and Hayashi to one-year terms so that they could both serve as Prosecutor-General, but this would require an extension of the retirement age.

=== Retirement controversy ===
In late January 2020, Prime Minister Shinzo Abe decided to extend Kurokawa's term to August 2020. The government argued that the extension was legal under Japan's National Public Service Act, while the opposition argued that this was inconsistent with past interpretation of the law, and that the extension was a political move meant to allow Kurokawa to replace Japan's Prosecutor-General Nobuo Inada. Constitutional Democratic Party leader Yukio Edano described Kurokawa as controlling judicial administration in compliance with Abe's directives. The extension resulted in a no confidence motion by the opposition against Justice Minister Masako Mori, which was voted down by the ruling parties.

Following the controversy over Kurokawa's retirement, Prime Minister Abe and Liberal Democratic Party Secretary-General Toshihiro Nikai agreed to a bill that would extend the mandatory retirement age of all prosecutors; however, the bill was abandoned due to a lack of understanding among the public. The legislation had been publicly opposed in a Twitter campaign involving a number of Japanese celebrities, including Arata Irua, Tadanobu Asano, Sayaka Akimoto, Chica Umino, Kotobuki Shiriagari, and Kayoko Okubo.

Former prosecutor Nobuo Gohara publicly commented that the Cabinet sought to appoint Kurokawa as Prosecutor-General in order to gain greater control over the public prosecutor's office, which had historically operated with a great deal of independent power, most notably its takedown of Prime Minister Kakuei Tanaka in the 1970s. Gohara also commented that incumbent Prosecutor-General Inada preferred Hayashi as his successor and resented the Cabinet's support of Kurokawa.

=== Resignation ===
Kurokawa resigned from office in May 2020 after admitting to gambling on mahjong with reporters in violation of social distancing guidelines during the COVID-19 pandemic. He was formally warned about his conduct, which Justice Minister Mori described as "truly inappropriate and extremely regrettable." The Asahi Shimbun reported that the Justice Ministry initially planned to issue a formal reprimand, but that the Cabinet decided to impose a lesser punishment. Kurokawa was also accused of bribery with regard to taking luxury taxis hired by the Sankei Shimbun newspaper. Prosecutors decided not to indict Kurokawa or the reporters for these offenses, on the basis that the amounts involved were not large and that Kurokawa had already been socially punished.

Public dissatisfaction over Prime Minister Abe's handling of the resignation led to Abe's support levels falling from 40% to 27% in May 2020, a record low since he took office in 2012. Abe announced his resignation later that year.
