= Shizuo Satō =

Japanese politician (1931–2022)

- 佐藤 静雄
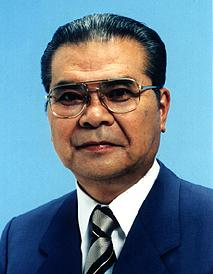
- Official portrait, 1997

Member of the House of Councillors
- In office 27 July 1992 – 12 July 1998
- Preceded by: Tadashi Yaoita
- Succeeded by: Mitsuhide Iwaki
- Constituency: Fukushima at-large

Personal details
- Born: 4 November 1931 Sōma, Fukushima, Japan
- Died: 16 January 2022 (aged 90)
- Party: Liberal Democratic
- Children: 2
- Education: Tohoku University

Shizuo Satō (Japanese: 佐藤静雄 Satō Shizuo; 4 November 1931 – 16 January 2022) was a Japanese politician. A member of the Liberal Democratic Party, he served in the House of Councillors from 1992 to 1998. He died from a myocardial infarction on 16 January 2022, at the age of 90.
