= Fukushima 5th district =

- Former Parliamentary constituency for the Japanese House of Representatives
- Prefecture: Fukushima
- Proportional District: Tohoku

Former constituency
- Created: 1994
- Abolished: 2022
- Seats: One
- Party: —
- Representative: —

Fukushima 5th district (福島県第5区, Fukushima-ken dai-goku) or simply 福島5区 (Fukushima-goku) was a single-member constituency of the House of Representatives in the national Diet of Japan located in Fukushima Prefecture.

== Areas covered ==
=== 1994 - 2022 ===
- Iwaki
- Futaba District

== List of representatives ==
Election	Representative	Party	Notes
1996	Goji Sakamoto	New Frontier	
1996	Goji Sakamoto	Independent	
1996	Goji Sakamoto	LDP	
2000	Masayoshi Yoshino	LDP	
2003	Goji Sakamoto	LDP	
2005	Masayoshi Yoshino	LDP	
2009	Izumi Yoshida	Democratic	
2012	Goji Sakamoto	LDP	
2014	Masayoshi Yoshino	LDP	
2017	Masayoshi Yoshino	LDP	
2021	Masayoshi Yoshino	LDP	

== Election results ==
=== 2021 ===
2021
Party	Candidate	Votes	%	±%
LDP	Masayoshi Yoshino	93,325	62.66	
JCP	Tomo Kumagai	55,619	37.34	
Majority		37,706	25.32	
Registered electors		320,273		
Turnout			48.00	▼1.73
LDP hold				

=== 2017 ===
2017
Party	Candidate	Votes	%	±%
LDP	Masayoshi Yoshino	86,461	53.61	
Kibō no Tō	Izumi Yoshida	51,478	31.92	New
JCP	Tomo Kumagai	16,154	10.02	
Social Democratic	Yōko Endo	7,186	4.46	New
Majority		34,983	21.69	
Registered electors		331,667		
Turnout			49.73	▲1.98
LDP hold				

=== 2014 ===
2014
Party	Candidate	Votes	%	±%
LDP	Masayoshi Yoshino	71,102	46.57	
Democratic	Izumi Yoshida	60,041	39.33	
JCP	Eisaku Yoshida	21,527	14.10	
Majority		11,061	7.24	
Registered electors		328,896		
Turnout			47.75	▼6.95
LDP hold				

=== 2012 ===
2012
Party	Candidate	Votes	%	±%
LDP	Goji Sakamoto	61,440	34.94	
Democratic	Izumi Yoshida (Won PR seat)	54,497	30.99	
Restoration	Noboru Usami	26,299	14.96	New
JCP	Eisaku Yoshida	16,479	9.37	N/A
Your	Kazumasa Sugamoto	10,177	5.79	New
Tomorrow	Kiichi Matsumoto	6,937	3.95	New
Majority		6,943	3.95	
Registered electors		331,670		
Turnout			54.70	▼13.66
LDP gain from Democratic				

=== 2009 ===
2009
Party	Candidate	Votes	%	±%
Democratic	Izumi Yoshida	135,692	59.05	
LDP	Goji Sakamoto	88,968	38.71	
Happiness Realization	Tsuyoshi Ishiwata	5,150	2.24	New
Majority		46,724	20.34	
Registered electors		343,654		
Turnout			68.36	▼1.70
Democratic gain from LDP				

=== 2005 ===
2005
Party	Candidate	Votes	%	±%
LDP	Masayoshi Yoshino	112,808	47.62	
Democratic	Izumi Yoshida (Won PR seat)	92,935	39.23	New
JCP	Eisaku Yoshida	18,783	7.93	
People's New	Takumi Suzuki	12,345	5.21	New
Majority		19,873	8.39	
Registered electors		347,314		
Turnout			70.06	▲8.17
LDP hold				

=== 2003 ===
2003
Party	Candidate	Votes	%	±%
LDP	Goji Sakamoto	100,600	48.13	
Democratic	Izumi Yoshida (Won PR seat)	84,480	40.42	
JCP	Eisaku Yoshida	16,520	7.90	
Independent	Shigeo Nagayama	7,418	3.55	New
Majority		16,120	7.71	
Turnout			61.89	
LDP hold				

=== 2000 ===
2000
Party	Candidate	Votes	%	±%
LDP	Masayoshi Yoshino	109,270	52.59	
Democratic	Izumi Yoshida	73,903	35.57	
JCP	Eisaku Yoshida	24,616	11.85	
Majority		35,367	17.02	
Turnout				
LDP hold				

=== 1996 ===
1996
Party	Candidate	Votes	%	±%
New Frontier	Goji Sakamoto	79,027	38.24	New
LDP	Naoki Tanaka	78,690	38.08	New
Democratic	Hisashi Suzuki	34,082	16.49	New
JCP	Toshihiko Sato	14,862	7.19	New
Majority		337	0.16	
Turnout				
New Frontier win (new seat)				
