= Hokuto Hoshi =

Japanese politician (born 1964)

- 星 北斗
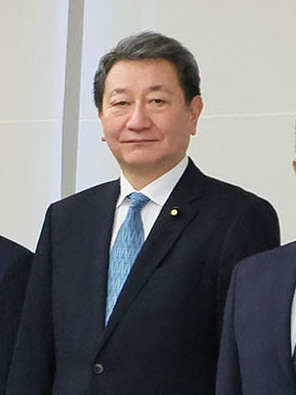

Member of the House of Councillors
- Incumbent
- Assumed office 26 July 2022
- Preceded by: Teruhiko Mashiko
- Constituency: Fukushima at-large

Personal details
- Born: 18 March 1964 (age 62) Kōriyama, Fukushima, Japan
- Party: Liberal Democratic
- Education: Toho University; Fukushima Medical University

Hokuto Hoshi (born March 18, 1964) is a Japanese politician and physician who has served as a member of the House of Councillors of Japan since 2022.

== Early life and education ==
Hoshi was born in Fukushima Prefecture on March 18, 1964. In 1989, he graduated from the medical school of Toho University, and began working for the Ministry of Health and Welfare.

== Career ==
In 1996, Hoshi served as a visiting researcher at the Harvard University School of Public Health. In 2015, he was named vice-president of the Fukushima Prefectural Medical Association. He ran as a candidate for the Liberal Democratic party in the 2022 Japanese House of Councillors election and won.
