= Yōko Kamikawa =

Japanese politician (born 1953)

- 上川 陽子
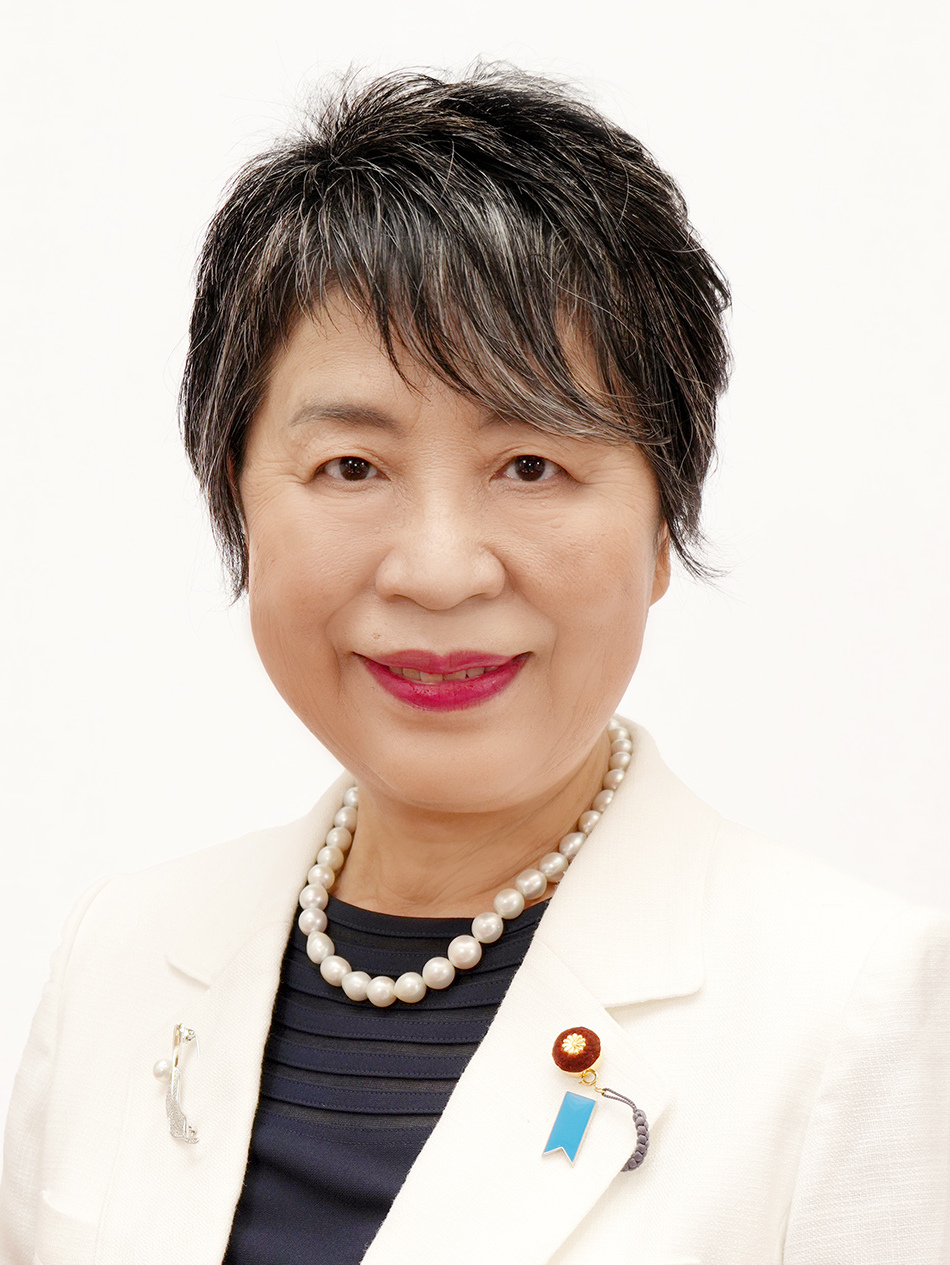
- Official portrait, 2024

Minister for Foreign Affairs
- In office 13 September 2023 – 1 October 2024
- Prime Minister: Fumio Kishida
- Preceded by: Yoshimasa Hayashi
- Succeeded by: Takeshi Iwaya

Minister of Justice
- In office 16 September 2020 – 4 October 2021
- Prime Minister: Yoshihide Suga
- Preceded by: Masako Mori
- Succeeded by: Yoshihisa Furukawa
- In office 3 August 2017 – 2 October 2018
- Prime Minister: Shinzo Abe
- Preceded by: Katsutoshi Kaneda
- Succeeded by: Takashi Yamashita
- In office 20 October 2014 – 7 October 2015
- Prime Minister: Shinzo Abe
- Preceded by: Midori Matsushima
- Succeeded by: Mitsuhide Iwaki

Member of the House of Representatives
- Incumbent
- Assumed office 18 December 2012
- Preceded by: Seishū Makino
- Constituency: Shizuoka 1st
- In office 27 June 2000 – 21 July 2009
- Preceded by: Yoshinori Oguchi
- Succeeded by: Seishū Makino
- Constituency: Shizuoka 1st (2000–2003); Tōkai PR (2003–2005); Shizuoka 1st (2005–2009)

Personal details
- Born: 1 March 1953 (age 73) Shizuoka, Japan
- Party: Liberal Democratic
- Spouse: Takunae Kamikawa
- Children: 2
- Education: University of Tokyo (BA); Harvard University (MPP)
- Occupation: Researcher • Politician
- Website: Official website

Yōko Kamikawa (上川 陽子, Kamikawa Yōko; born 1 March 1953) is a Japanese politician and former think tank researcher who served as the Minister for Foreign Affairs between September 2023 and October 2024. She served as the Minister of Justice from September 2020 to October 2021, and also served as Minister of State for Gender Equality and Social Affairs in the cabinets of Shinzō Abe and Yasuo Fukuda. She has been a member of the House of Representatives since December 2012.

== Early life and education ==
She was born in the city of Shizuoka in Shizuoka Prefecture on 1 March 1953. She attended the University of Tokyo, where she specialised in international relations at the College of Arts and Sciences. During her time at university, she was a member of the Aikido team. She graduated from the university in March 1977 and began working as a researcher at the Mitsubishi Research Institute in April. In 1988 she received a master's degree in public policy from the John F. Kennedy School of Government, Harvard University. In addition, she worked as a fellow under United States Senator Max Baucus. She is married to Takunae Kamikawa, her classmate from the University of Tokyo, and they have two daughters.

== Political career ==
=== House of Representatives ===
She was elected to the House of Representatives for the first time in June 2000. She has been re-elected at every election until 2009. She was elected again in 2012. She has represented the Shizuoka 1st district between 2000 and 2003, 2005 to 2009 and again since 2012. She also represented the Tōkai proportional representation block between 2003 and 2005.

=== Minister of Justice ===
During her time as Minister of Justice, Kamikawa ordered 16 executions where 13 of those executed being former members of the Aum Shinrikyo doomsday cult, whose acts of domestic terrorism included the 1995 Tokyo subway sarin attack.

=== Minister of Foreign Affairs ===
Following a cabinet reshuffle on 13 September 2023, she was appointed minister of foreign affairs.

She made a surprise visit to Kyiv, Ukraine in January 2024, where she expressed Japan's support for Ukraine and the Japanese government's willingness of strengthening aid and bilateral ties with the country. She also signalled that the Japanese government would be willing to co-lead Ukraine's proposed peace agreement on radiation and nuclear else safety.

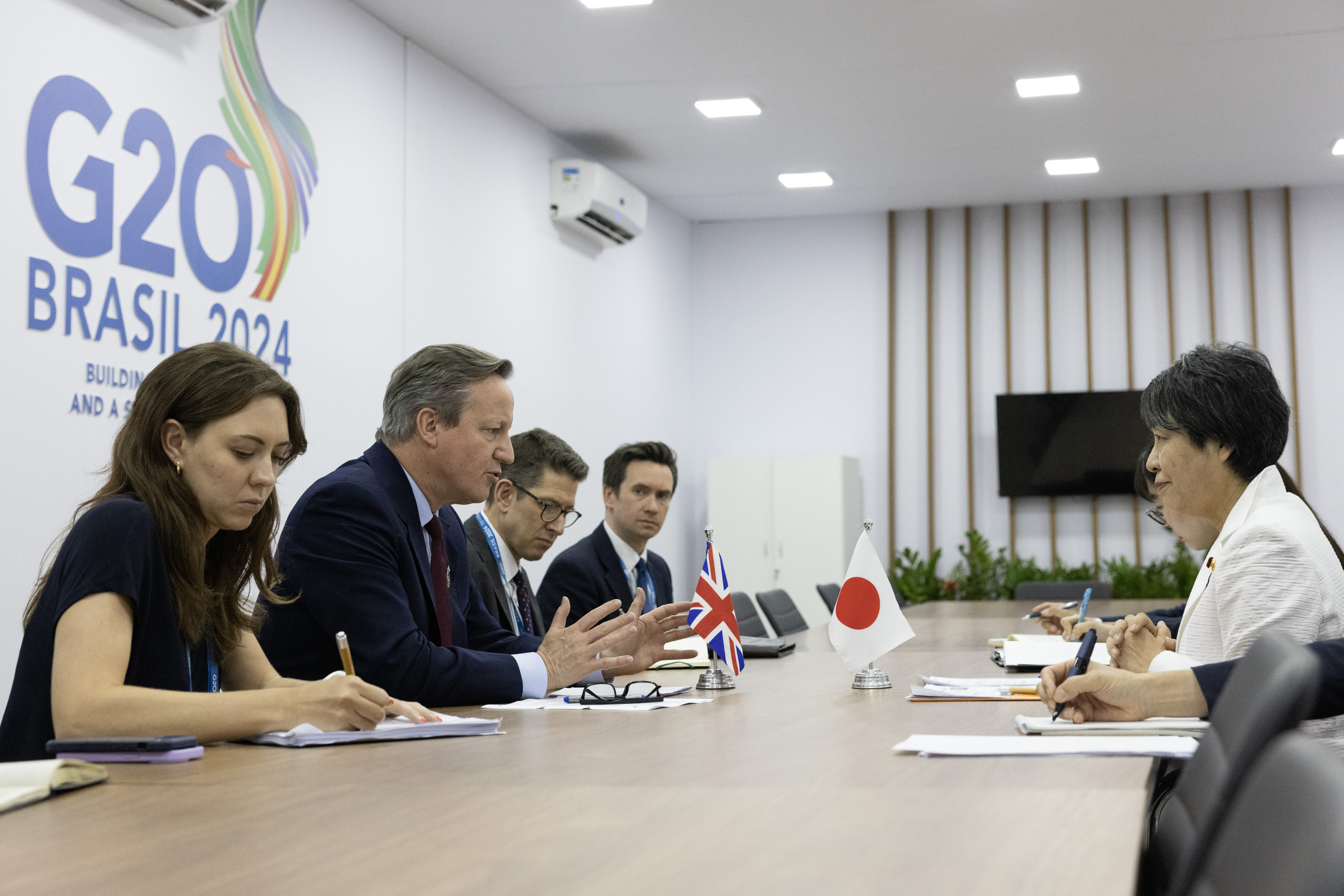
Kamikawa in Brazil to attend the G20 Foreign Ministers' Meeting in February 2024

In addition, Kamikawa has made other recent trips abroad. In early February 2024, she visited Samoa and Fiji to attend the 5th Ministerial Interim Meeting of the Pacific Islands Leaders Meeting (PALM). During the meeting, participants shared views on policy developments and changing international situations. In late February, Kamikawa attended the G20 Foreign Minister's Meeting in Brazil, to discuss current global affairs.

In March 2024, Kamikawa visited New York, where she chaired the Ministerial Meeting of the United Nations Security Council (UNSC) on "Nuclear Disarmarment and Non-Proliferation."

She was succeeded by Takeshi Iwaya when Shigeru Ishiba formed his cabinet on 1 October 2024.

== Political views ==
=== Gender equality ===
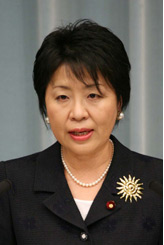
Kamikawa's first cabinet post was Minister of State for Gender Equality in 2007

Kamikawa has highlighted the importance of women's perspectives in making the society better. During her interview, she has explained her view through her belief on diversity. She thinks that in a diverse society, the society is able to consider a range of perspectives and become aware of aspects that may have been previously overlooked. On this note, she adds that it is essential for society as a whole to actively incorporate women's perspectives that may have been overlooked in the past and to embrace change.

As the WPL ambassador in Japan, I pledge that I will take these themes into political discussions and do my best to bear substantial outcome, in addition to attaining the numerical goals.

The above quote is based on the Women Political Leaders (WPL) Summit held in Tokyo in 2019. During this time, she highlighted the importance of health and decent work, release from poverty and violence for women.

In May 2024, Kamikawa was accused of equating women's worth with childbirth after asking "how can we women call ourselves women without birthing this person" during a rally for the Shizuoka Prefecture gubernatorial election. However, there has been a debate about whether to interpret the verb 'umu (うむ)' as 'give birth to (産む)' or 'produce (生む)', and the initial Kyodo News report has been criticised for being taken out of context. She subsequently retracted her remarks, saying that she had meant to ask female voters to exercise their power to elect the LDP candidate just as she was "born" as a House of Representatives member in the 2000 election.

Political offices
Preceded by Midori Matsushima	Minister of Justice; 2014–2015	Succeeded by Mitsuhide Iwaki
Preceded by Katsutoshi Kaneda	Minister of Justice; 2017–2018	Succeeded by Takashi Yamashita
Preceded by Masako Mori	Minister of Justice; 2020–2021	Succeeded by Yoshihisa Furukawa
Preceded by Yoshimasa Hayashi	Minister of Foreign Affairs; 2023–2024	Succeeded by Takeshi Iwaya
