= Yoshinori Oguchi =

Japanese politician

- 大口 善徳
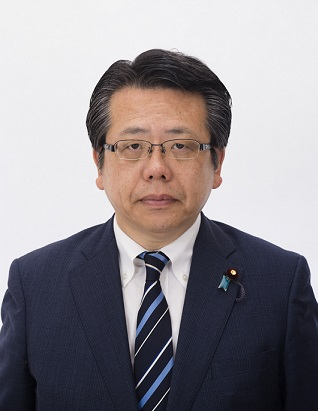
- Official portrait, 2015

Member of the House of Representatives
- In office 14 November 2003 – 9 October 2024
- Constituency: Tōkai PR
- In office 18 July 1993 – 25 June 2000
- Preceded by: Yoshihiko Yabunaka
- Succeeded by: Yōko Kamikawa
- Constituency: Former Shizuoka 1st (1993–1996); Shizuoka 1st (1996–2000)

Personal details
- Born: 5 September 1955 (age 71) Abeno, Osaka, Japan
- Party: Komeito
- Other political affiliations: CGP (1993–1996); NFP (1996–1998)
- Education: Soka University

Yoshinori Oguchi (大口 善徳, Ōguchi Yoshinori; born 5 September 1955) is a former Japanese politician who served as a member of the House of Representatives in the Diet for the Komeito Party. A native of Osaka and graduate of Soka University, he was elected to the House of Representatives for the first time in 1993.
