= Ryutaro Sakamoto =

Japanese politician

- 坂本 竜太郎
- Official portrait, 2026

Member of the House of Representatives
- Incumbent
- Assumed office 28 October 2024
- Preceded by: Shinji Oguma
- Constituency: Fukushima 4th

Member of the Fukushima Prefectural Assembly
- In office 2015–2023

Member of the Iwaki City Council
- In office 2009–2010

Personal details
- Born: 28 March 1980 (age 46) Iwaki, Fukushima, Japan
- Party: Liberal Democratic
- Parent: Goji Sakamoto (father)
- Education: Chuo University
- Website: Ryutaro Sakamoto website

Ryutaro Sakamoto (坂本 竜太郎, Sakamoto Ryutaro; born 28 March 1980) is a Japanese politician of the Liberal Democratic Party, who serves as a member of the House of Representatives.

== Early years ==
On 28 March 1980, Sakamoto was born in Iwaki, Fukushima Prefecture. After graduating from the Chuo University's Faculty of Law, he served a secretary to his father Goji Sakamoto.

== Political career ==
In 2009, Sakamoto ran on the Iwaki City Council by-election and won.

In December 2010, he resigned from the city council following the drunk driving incident mentioned below.

In November 2015, he ran for the Fukushima Prefectural Assembly and won.

In November 2019, he was re-elected and secured his second-term.

On October 25, 2023, Sakamoto announced that he would not run in the following month's Fukushima Prefectural Assembly election. This move was intended to explore the possibility of running as a successor to Masayoshi Yoshino, who had been unofficially nominated as the candidate for Fukushima 4th district (including Iwaki City) but it was thought that he would run due to health issues.

On 30 September 2024, Masayoshi Yoshino announced his retirement from politics officially. The following day, Sakamoto held a press conference and declared his candidacy, stating: "Mr. Yoshino has made a very grave decision. We must firmly carry on his aspirations and achievements, and fulfill our responsibilities."

In the 2024 general election, Sakamoto defeated CDP’s Yūki Saito after a close race and was elected for the first time.

In the 2026 general election, he defeated CRA's Saito.

== Scandal ==
=== Driving under the influence of alcohol ===
On 7 December 2010, Sakamoto, who was then a member of the Iwaki City Council, caused a collision with a truck while driving in Iwaki City. He was arrested by officers arriving at the scene for violating the Road Traffic Act (driving under the influence of alcohol). Subsequently, Sakamoto resigned from the city council. In July of the following year, the Iwaki Summary Court issued him a summary order to pay a fine of 500,000 yen.
