= Fukushima 1st district =

Japan House of Representatives constituency

- Parliamentary constituency for the Japanese House of Representatives
- Numbered map of Fukushima Prefecture single-member districts
- Prefecture: Fukushima
- Proportional District: Tōhoku
- Electorate: 385,061 (1.698 times the population of Tottori 1st district)

Current constituency
- Created: 1994
- Seats: One
- Party: LDP
- Representative: Naotoshi Nishiyama
- Municipalities: Fukushima, Nihonmatsu, Date City, Motomiya, Date District, Adachi District

Fukushima 1st district is a constituency of the House of Representatives in the Diet of Japan.

== History ==
The constituency primarily consists of Fukushima and Date City, alongside Nihonmatsu. From the districts formation in 1994 and the first election in 1996 to 2012, the district primarily consisted of match-ups between the Ishihara family (unrelated to Shintaro Ishihara, of descent from Takuya Inoue) and LDP candidates, either Yoshitami Kameoka or, pre-2003, Tatsuo Sato. Kameoka has run in the district since 1996, and joined the LDP after Sato retired.

In 2014, the Democratic Party of Japan broke away from running Ishihara descendants after their past representative, Yosaburo Ishihara, had joined the Tomorrow Party of Japan. Instead, they ran Emi Kaneko, a former member of the House of Councillors. She managed to close the gap to 3%, but ultimately lost, and was revived on proportional representation.

The two had a rematch in 2017, with Kaneko running as an independent following the merger of the Democratic Party with Kibō no Tō shortly before for the election. As an independent, she would not have been revived on the proportional block had she lost, but she managed to defeat Kameoka for the first time since 2012. She held the district again in 2021 after joining the CDP, but with a slightly narrower margin. Kameoka was revived proportionally both times.

In 2024, Kameoka was found to have been involved in the 2023–2024 Japanese slush fund scandal. He was allowed to stay in the party, but was kicked off of the proportional list, meaning that he would not be revived under any circumstance due to his involvement. In the end, Kaneko managed to beat him by nearly twenty points. This left Kameoka without a seat in the Diet.

== List of representatives ==
Representative	Party	Years served	Notes
Tatsuo Sato	LDP	1996-2005	
Yoshitami Kameoka	LDP	2005-2009	
Yosaburo Ishihara	DPJ	2009-2012	
Yosaburo Ishihara	PLF	2012	Left DPJ after consumption tax vote.
Yosaburo Ishihara	TPJ	2012	Joined TPJ when PLF merged. Lost re-election.
Yoshitami Kameoka	LDP	2012-2017	Lost re-election. Revived on proportional block, until 2024.
Emi Kaneko	Independent	2017-2019	
Emi Kaneko	CDP	2019-2026	Joined CDP.
Emi Kaneko	CRA	2026	Joined CRA. Lost re-election but was revived on proportional block.
Naotoshi Nishiyama	LDP	2026-	

== Election results ==
2026
Party	Candidate	Votes	%	±%
LDP	Naotoshi Nishiyama	99,531	45.24	▲4.84
Centrist Reform	Emi Kaneko (won a seat in PR block)	93,471	42.48	New
Independent	Yoshikazu Kameoka	27,013	12.28	New
Turnout		220,015	59.97	▲3.63
LDP gain from Centrist Reform				

2024
Party	Candidate	Votes	%	±%
CDP	Emi Kaneko	124,441	59.60	▲8.45
LDP	Yoshitami Kameoka	84,351	40.40	▼8.45
Turnout		208,792	56.34	▼4.27
CDP hold				

2021
Party	Candidate	Votes	%	±%
CDP	Emi Kaneko	123,620	51.15	New
LDP	Yoshitami Kameoka (won a seat in PR block)	118,074	48.85	▲1.59
Turnout		241,694	60.61	▲2.17
CDP hold				

2017
Party	Candidate	Votes	%	±%
Independent	Emi Kaneko	126,664	52.74	New
LDP	Yoshitami Kameoka (won a seat in PR block)	113,514	47.26	▼0.10
Turnout		240,178	58.44	▲4.91
Independent gain from LDP				

2014
Party	Candidate	Votes	%	±%
LDP	Yoshitami Kameoka	102,950	47.36	▼3.61
Democratic	Emi Kaneko (won a seat in PR block)	97,643	44.92	▲26.17
JCP	Yasuko Wantanabe	16,787	7.72	▼1.48
Turnout		217,380	53.53	▼5.47
LDP hold				

2012
Party	Candidate	Votes	%	±%
LDP	Yoshitami Kameoka	121,235	50.97	▲7.21
Tomorrow	Yosaburo Ishihara	50,141	21.08	New
Democratic	Hideki Ohba	44,599	18.75	▼31.28
JCP	Chiiko Wanatanabe	21,896	9.20	▲4.11
Turnout		237,871	59.00	▼14.86
LDP gain from Tomorrow				

2009
Party	Candidate	Votes	%	±%
Democratic	Yosaburo Ishihara	156,060	50.03	▲13.64
LDP	Yoshitami Kameoka	136,526	43.76	▼13.08
JCP	Yutaka Yamada	15,879	5.09	▼1.68
Happiness Realization	Kazuyuki Ohashi	3,492	1.12	New
Turnout		311,957	73.86	▲2.50
Democratic gain from LDP				

2005
Party	Candidate	Votes	%	±%
LDP	Yoshitami Kameoka	171,507	56.84	▲21.92
Democratic	Nobuichiro Ishihara	109,795	36.39	▲10.94
JCP	Yutaka Yamada	20,412	6.77	▲1.39
Turnout		301,714	71.36	▲4.42
LDP hold				

2003
Party	Candidate	Votes	%	±%
LDP	Tatsuo Sato	98,896	34.92	▲4.67
Independents	Yoshitami Kameoka	96,954	34.23	New
Democratic	Nobuichiro Ishihara	72,076	25.45	▲6.21
JCP	Yutaka Yamada	15,241	5.38	▼1.37
Turnout		283,167	66.94	
LDP hold				

2000
Party	Candidate	Votes	%	±%
LDP	Tatsuo Sato	89,353	30.25	▼10.13
Independent	Yoshitami Kameoka	68,874	23.31	New
Democratic	Hiromichi Kibata	56,838	19.24	New
Liberal	Kentaro Ishihara	32,166	10.89	New
Social Democratic	Tsuneharu Sato	28,251	9.56	▼5.42
JCP	Shinmi Masayo	19,927	6.75	▼1.27
Turnout		295,409		
LDP hold				

1996
Party	Candidate	Votes	%	±%
LDP	Kenzo Muraoka	102,950	40.38	New
Independent	Kentaro Ishihara	93,347	36.61	New
Social Democratic	Tsuneharu Sato	38,196	14.98	New
JCP	Katsuo Okazaki	20,451	8.02	New
Turnout		254,944		
LDP hold				
