= Teruhiko Mashiko =

Japanese politician

- 増子 輝彦
- Official portrait, 2009

Member of the House of Councillors
- In office 25 April 2007 – 25 July 2022
- Preceded by: Yūhei Satō
- Succeeded by: Hokuto Hoshi
- Constituency: Fukushima at-large

Member of the House of Representatives
- In office 10 November 2003 – 8 August 2005
- Constituency: Tohoku PR
- In office 19 February 1990 – 27 September 1996
- Preceded by: Takao Kameoka
- Succeeded by: Constituency abolished
- Constituency: Fukushima 1st

Member of the Fukushima Prefectural Assembly
- In office 1983–1986
- Constituency: Kōriyama City

Personal details
- Born: 8 October 1947 (age 79) Kōriyama, Fukushima, Japan
- Party: Independent
- Other political affiliations: LDP (1983–1986; 1993–1994); NFP (1994–1998); GGP (1998); DPJ (1998–2016); DP (2016–2018); DPP (2018–2020)
- Relatives: Goji Sakamoto (brother-in-law); Ryutaro Sakamoto (nephew)
- Education: Waseda University

Teruhiko Mashiko (増子 輝彦, Mashiko Teruhiko; born 8 October 1947) is a Japanese politician of the who has served as a member of the House of Representatives and the House of Councillors in the Diet (national legislature).

== Career ==
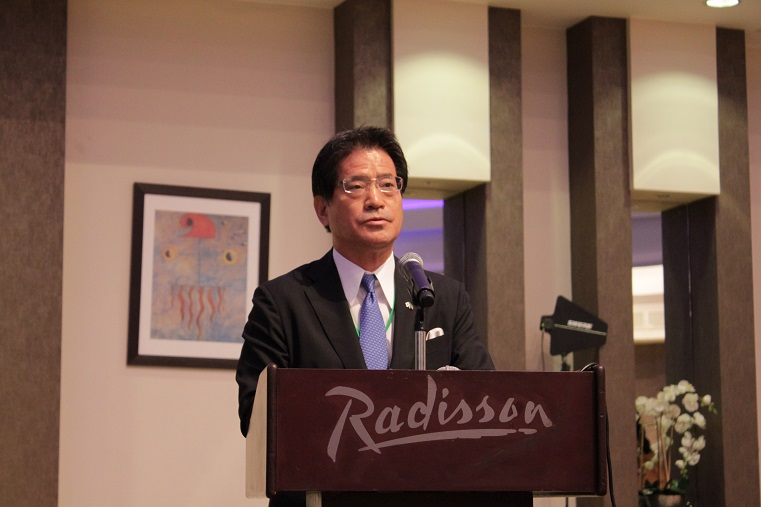
Mashiko in Lusaka, Zambia in September 2014

A native of Kōriyama, Fukushima and graduate of Waseda University, he ran unsuccessfully for the House of Representatives in 1986 after serving in the assembly of Fukushima Prefecture for one term since 1983. He ran again in 1990 and was elected for the first time. After losing his seat in 1996, he ran unsuccessfully in 2000 but was elected in 2003. He lost his seat again in 2005. In 2007, he was elected, this time to the House of Councillors, for the first time.
