= Fukushima at-large district =

Japan House of Councillors constituency

- 福島県選挙区
- Parliamentary constituency for the House of Councillors
- Prefecture: Fukushima
- Electorate: 1,545,913 (as of September 2022)

Current constituency
- Created: 1947
- Seats: 2
- Councillors: Class of 2028: Hokuto Hoshi (LDP); Class of 2031: Masako Mori (LDP)

The Fukushima at-large district (Japanese: 福島県選挙区, Hepburn: Fukushima-ken senkyoku) is a constituency that represents Fukushima Prefecture in the House of Councillors in the Diet of Japan. It currently has two Councillors in the 248-member house.

== Outline ==
From the first House of Councillors election in 1947 until the 2010 election, Fukushima elected four Councillors to six-year terms, two each at alternating elections held every three years. In September 2012 Fukushima had 1,627,518 registered voters, the lowest of the 12 prefectures that were represented by 4 Councillors at that time. By comparison, the three most populous districts of Hokkaido, Hyogo at-large district and Fukuoka districts each had more than 4 million voters but were also represented by four Councillors each. To address this malapportionment, a November 2012 amendment to the Public Offices Election Law reduced Fukushima's (and Gifu's) representation to two Councillors. This change began to take effect at the 2013 election, when only one Councillor was elected in Fukushima, and was completed at the 2016 election. The district has 1,607,908 registered voters as of September 2015.

The Councillors currently representing Fukushima are:

- Hokuto Hoshi (LDP, first term; term ends in 2028)
- Masako Mori (LDP, fourth term; term ends in 2031)

== Elected Councillors ==
Class of 1947		Election year	Class of 1950	
#2 (1947: 6-year term)	#1 (1947: 6-year term)	Election year	#1 (1947: 3-year term)	#2 (1947: 3-year term)
Kentaro Yui (Fukushima Democratic Club) (Note: Fukushima-ken Minshu Kurabu)	Tsuneo Matsudaira (Ind.) (Note: Selected as first President of the House. Later joined Ryokufūkai. Died in office 14 November 1949.)	1947	Manuemon Hashimoto (Democratic)	Toshikatsu Tanaka (Social Democratic)
Kentaro Yui (Fukushima Democratic Club)	Kanichiro Ishihara (Democratic Liberal)	1949 by-election (Note: Held 24 December 1949)	Manuemon Hashimoto (Democratic)	Toshikatsu Tanaka (Social Democratic)
Kentaro Yui (Fukushima Democratic Club)	Kanichiro Ishihara (Democratic Liberal)	1950	Manuemon Hashimoto (Liberal) (Note: Died in office 27 December 1950)	Morie Kimura (Liberal)
Kentaro Yui (Fukushima Democratic Club)	Kanichiro Ishihara (Democratic Liberal)	1951 by-election (Note: Held 12 February 1951)	Isao Matsudaira (Liberal)	Morie Kimura (Liberal)
Kanemitsu Tabata (Right Socialist)	Kanichiro Ishihara (Liberal)	1953	Isao Matsudaira (Liberal)	Morie Kimura (Liberal)
Kanemitsu Tabata (Right Socialist)	Kanichiro Ishihara (Liberal)	1956	Isao Matsudaira (Liberal)	Ichiji Okawara (Social Democratic)
Kanemitsu Tabata (Social Democratic)	Kanichiro Ishihara (LDP)	1959	Isao Matsudaira (Liberal)	Ichiji Okawara (Social Democratic)
Kanemitsu Tabata (Social Democratic)	Kanichiro Ishihara (LDP)	1962	Isao Matsudaira (Liberal)	Ichiji Okawara (Social Democratic)
Hidezo Murata (Social Democratic) (Note: Died in office 5 January 1985.)	Kanichiro Ishihara (LDP)	1965	Isao Matsudaira (Liberal)	Ichiji Okawara (Social Democratic)
Hidezo Murata (Social Democratic)	Kanichiro Ishihara (LDP)	1968	Isao Matsudaira (Liberal)	Seigo Suzuki (LDP)
Hidezo Murata (Social Democratic)	Shiro Tanabe (LDP)	1971	Isao Matsudaira (Liberal)	Seigo Suzuki (LDP)
Hidezo Murata (Social Democratic)	Shiro Tanabe (LDP)	1974	Tadao Noguchi (Social Democratic)	Seigo Suzuki (LDP)
Hidezo Murata (Social Democratic)	Shoichi Suzuki (LDP)	1977	Tadao Noguchi (Social Democratic)	Seigo Suzuki (LDP)
Hidezo Murata (Social Democratic)	Shoichi Suzuki (LDP)	1980	Tadashi Yaoita (Social Democratic)	Seigo Suzuki (LDP)
Hidezo Murata (Social Democratic)	Eisaku Sato (LDP) (Note: Resigned 3 August 1988)	1983	Tadashi Yaoita (Social Democratic)	Seigo Suzuki (LDP)
Masutaro Soeta (LDP)	Eisaku Sato (LDP)	1985 by-election (Note: Held 17 February 1985)	Tadashi Yaoita (Social Democratic)	Seigo Suzuki (LDP)
Masutaro Soeta (LDP)	Eisaku Sato (LDP)	1986	Tadashi Yaoita (Social Democratic)	Seigo Suzuki (LDP)
Masutaro Soeta (LDP)	Kentaro Ishihara (LDP) (Note: Resigned 21 June 1993)	1988 by-election (Note: Held 4 September 1988)	Tadashi Yaoita (Social Democratic)	Seigo Suzuki (LDP)
Choei Aita (Social Democratic)	Kentaro Ishihara (LDP)	1989	Tadashi Yaoita (Social Democratic)	Seigo Suzuki (LDP)
Choei Aita (Social Democratic)	Kentaro Ishihara (LDP)	1992	Shizuo Satō (LDP)	Seigo Suzuki (LDP)
Choei Aita (Social Democratic)	Toyoaki Ota (LDP)	1993 by-election (Note: Held 18 July 1993)	Shizuo Satō (LDP)	Seigo Suzuki (LDP)
Hiroko Wada (New Frontier)	Toyoaki Ota (LDP)	1995	Shizuo Satō (LDP)	Seigo Suzuki (LDP)
Hiroko Wada (New Frontier)	Toyoaki Ota (LDP)	1998	Mitsuhide Iwaki (LDP)	Yuhei Sato (Ind.)
Hiroko Wada (DPJ)	Toyoaki Ota (LDP)	2001	Mitsuhide Iwaki (LDP)	Yuhei Sato (Ind.)
Hiroko Wada (DPJ)	Toyoaki Ota (LDP)	2004	Mitsuhide Iwaki (LDP)	Yuhei Sato (DPJ) (Note: Resigned 23 October 2006)
Hiroko Wada (DPJ)	Toyoaki Ota (LDP)	2007 by-election (Note: Held 22 April 2007)	Mitsuhide Iwaki (LDP)	Teruhiko Mashiko (DPJ)
Emi Kaneko (DPJ)	Masako Mori (LDP)	2007	Mitsuhide Iwaki (LDP)	Teruhiko Mashiko (DPJ)
Emi Kaneko (DPJ)	Masako Mori (LDP)	2010	Mitsuhide Iwaki (LDP)	Teruhiko Mashiko (DPJ)
Seat abolished	Masako Mori (LDP)	2013	Mitsuhide Iwaki (LDP)	Teruhiko Mashiko (DPJ)
Seat abolished	Masako Mori (LDP)	2016	Seat abolished	Teruhiko Mashiko (DPJ)
Seat abolished	Masako Mori (LDP)	2019	Seat abolished	Teruhiko Mashiko (DPJ)
Seat abolished	Masako Mori (LDP)	2022	Seat abolished	Hokuto Hoshi (LDP)
Seat abolished	Masako Mori (LDP)	2025	Seat abolished	Hokuto Hoshi (LDP)

== Election results ==
2025
Party	Candidate	Votes	%	±%
LDP	Masako Mori (Incumbent)	327,951	38.2%	▼15.88
CDP	Yōzaburō Ishihara	309,184	36.0%	New
Sanseito	Risako Ōyama	184,286	21.5%	New
Independent	Yūdai Endō	26,632	3.1%	New
Anti-NHK	Hiroyuki Ochi	10,070	1.2%	New
Turnout		1,507,594	58.39%	▲4.99

2022
Party	Candidate	Votes	%	±%
LDP	Hokuto Hoshi (Endorsed by Komeito)	419,701	51.58%	New
Independent	Akiko Onodera (Endorsed by the CDP, DPP, and SDP)	320,151	39.35%	New
Independent	Sanae Sato	30,913	3.80%	New
Sanseito	Sawako Kuboyama	23,027	2.83%	New
Anti-NHK	Makiko Minagawa	19,829	2.44%	New
Turnout		813,621	53.40%	▲0.99

2019
Party	Candidate	Votes	%	±%
LDP	Masako Mori (Incumbent) (Endorsed by Komeito)	445,547	54.08%	▼2.51
Independent	Sachiko Mizuno (Endorsed by the CDP, DPP, and SDP)	345,001	41.88%	New
Anti-NHK	Masahito Tayama	33,326	4.05%	New
Turnout		823,874	52.41%	▼4.71

2016
Party	Candidate	Votes	%	±%
Democratic	Teruhiko Mashiko (Incumbent)	462,852	50.50%	▲16.1
LDP	Mitsuhide Iwaki	432,982	47.24%	▲13.14
Happiness Realization	Hisshō Yanai	20,653	2.25%	New
Turnout			57.12%	▲2.6

2013
Party	Candidate	Votes	%	±%
LDP	Masako Mori (Endorsed by Komeito)	484,089	56.6	
Democratic	Emi Kaneko	240,842	28.2	
JCP	Tomo Iwabuchi	77,401	9.0	
Social Democratic	Yoko Endo (Endorsed by People's Life Party)	35,801	4.2	
Happiness Realization	Hidemitsu Sakai	9,860	1.2	
Zaisei Saiken	Kazushige Sugiuchi	7,425	0.9	
Turnout				

2010
Party	Candidate	Votes	%	±%
Democratic	Teruhiko Mashiko (Endorsed by People's New Party)	340,947	34.4	
LDP	Mitsuhide Iwaki	338,265	34.1	
Democratic	Hiromi Ito	155,262	15.6	
Your	Kazumasa Sugamoto	93,758	9.4	
JCP	Tomo Iwabuchi	64,209	6.5	
Turnout				

2007
Party	Candidate	Votes	%	±%
Democratic	Emi Kaneko	503,423	49.9	
LDP	Masako Mori (Endorsed by Komeito)	372,857	37.0	
JCP	Shizue Miyamoto	78,237	7.8	
Social Democratic	Usen Ogawa	54,466	5.4	
Turnout				

2007 by-election
Party	Candidate	Votes	%	±%
Democratic	Teruhiko Mashiko	541,236	58.1	
LDP	Isamu Yamaguchi	303,782	32.6	
JCP	Shizue Miyamoto	85,994	9.2	
Turnout		948,890	56.72	−3.62

2004
Party	Candidate	Votes	%	±%
Democratic	Yuhei Sato	445,560	45.4	
LDP	Mitsuhide Iwaki (endorsed by Komeito)	406,793	41.5	
JCP	Yumiko Abe	128,300	9.8	13.1
Turnout				

== See also ==
- List of districts of the House of Councillors of Japan
- Fukushima 3rd district, one of Fukushima Prefecture's five districts in the House of Representatives
