= Zenkichi Kojima =

Japanese mayor

- 小嶋 善吉

Mayor of Shizuoka
- In office August 1994 – 12 April 2011
- Preceded by: Shingo Amano
- Succeeded by: Nobuhiro Tanabe

Member of the Shizuoka Prefectural Assembly
- In office 1979–1991

Personal details
- Born: 30 May 1947 (age 79) Gifu Prefecture, Japan
- Party: Independent
- Education: University of Tokyo

Zenkichi Kojima (小嶋 善吉, Kojima Zenkichi; born May 30, 1947 in Gifu Prefecture) is a Japanese former politician who served as the mayor of Shizuoka City from 1994 to 2011, when he was succeeded by Nobuhiro Tanabe. A graduate of the University of Tokyo, he was first elected mayor in 1994 after serving in the assembly of Shizuoka Prefecture for three terms. He served as the first mayor of Shizuoka City after Shizuoka's merger with Shimizu in 2003.

In 1971, after college, he went to work at the Dai-Ichi Kangyo Bank (now Mizuho Bank) where he stayed until 1979. In 1979 he was elected to the Shizuoka Prefectural Assembly.

Political offices
Preceded by Shingo Amano	Mayor of former Shizuoka City; 1994–2003	City merger
New constituency	Mayor of Shizuoka City; 2003–2011	Succeeded by Nobuhiro Tanabe
