= Masayuki Aoyama =

Japanese attorney and politician

- 青山 雅幸

Member of the House of Representatives
- In office 22 October 2017 – 14 October 2021
- Constituency: Tōkai PR

Personal details
- Born: 2 March 1962 (age 64) Suruga, Shizuoka, Japan
- Party: Innovation (since 2020)
- Other political affiliations: DP (2016–2017); CDP (2017–2018); Independent (2018–2020)
- Education: Tohoku University

Masayuki Aoyama (青山雅幸, Aoyama Masayuki; born 1962) is a Japanese attorney and politician who represented Shizuoka Prefecture in the House of Representatives from 2017 to 2021.

== Early life and education ==
Aoyama was born in Shizuoka City and graduated from the faculty of law at Tohoku University. He practiced as an attorney before entering politics, and served as deputy chair of the Shizuoka Bar Association, among other posts. He was particularly active in representing plaintiffs in claims against the government related to hepatitis B infections and the Hamaoka Nuclear Power Plant.

== Political career ==
Aoyama ran in the 2017 general election as a Constitutional Democratic Party candidate in the Shizuoka 1st district, and won a seat in the House of Representatives through the proportional representation ticket.

Days after the election, the weekly magazine Shukan Bunshun published allegations by a secretary at Aoyama's law firm that he had made inappropriate sexual advances against her, including groping her leg in the back seat of a taxi. Aoyama issued an apology while denying some of the harassment claims. He was indefinitely suspended from CDP membership on October 26.
