= Izumi Yoshida =

Japanese politician

- 吉田 泉
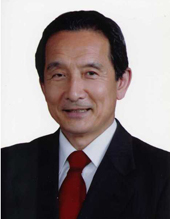
- Official portrait, 2011

Member of the House of Representatives
- In office 25 July 2017 – 28 September 2017
- Preceded by: Kazuko Kōri
- Succeeded by: Multi-member district
- Constituency: Tohoku PR
- In office 9 November 2003 – 21 November 2014
- Constituency: Tohoku PR (2003–2009); Fukushima 5th (2009–2012); Tohoku PR (2012–2014)

Member of the Iwaki City Council
- In office 1996–2000

Personal details
- Born: 26 February 1949 (age 77) Iwaki, Fukushima, Japan
- Party: Democratic
- Other political affiliations: DP (2016–2017); KnT (2017)
- Education: University of Tokyo

Izumi Yoshida (吉田 泉, Yoshida Izumi; born 26 February 1949) is former a Japanese politician of the Constitutional Democratic Party who served as a member of the House of Representatives in the Diet (national legislature). A native of Iwaki, Fukushima and graduate of the University of Tokyo, he was elected in 1996 as the mayor of Iwaki. After an unsuccessful run in 2000, he was elected to the House of Representatives for the first time in 2003.
