= Masayoshi Yoshino =

Japanese politician

- 吉野 正芳
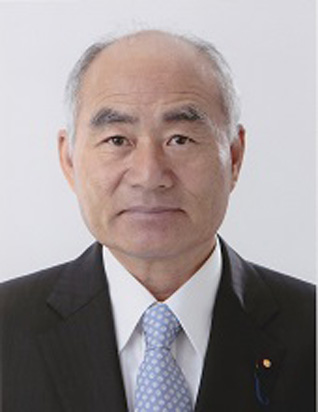
- Official portrait, 2017

Minister for Reconstruction
- In office 26 April 2017 – 2 October 2018
- Prime Minister: Shinzo Abe
- Preceded by: Masahiro Imamura
- Succeeded by: Hiromichi Watanabe

Member of the House of Representatives; from Tohoku
- In office 25 June 2000 – 9 October 2024
- Preceded by: Goji Sakamoto
- Succeeded by: Constituency abolished
- Constituency: See list: Fukushima 5th (2000–2003); PR block (2003–2005); Fukushima 5th (2005–2009); PR block (2009–2014); Fukushima 5th (2014–2024)

Member of the Fukushima Prefectural Assembly
- In office 1987–1999

Personal details
- Born: 8 August 1948 (age 78) Iwaki, Fukushima, Japan
- Party: Liberal Democratic
- Education: Waseda University

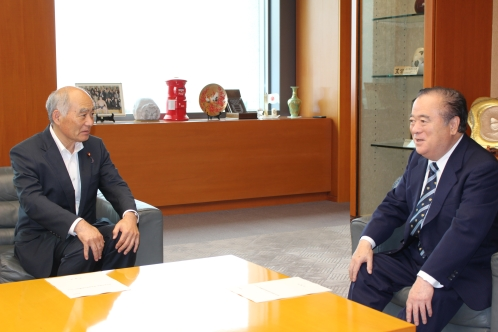
Masayoshi Yoshino and Governor of Ibaraki Prefecture Masaru Hashimoto in 2017

Masayoshi Yoshino (吉野 正芳, Yoshino Masayoshi; born 8 August 1948) is a Japanese politician of the Liberal Democratic Party, a former member of the House of Representatives in the Diet. A native of Iwaki, Fukushima and graduate of Waseda University, he was elected to the first of his three terms in the assembly of Fukushima Prefecture in 1987 and then to the House of Representatives for the first time in 2000. He represented the Fukushima 5th district from 2014 until 2024 when the district was abolished.

On 26 April 2017, he became the minister responsible for disaster reconstruction in the Tohoku Region, after the previous minister, Masahiro Imamura, resigned after making insensitive remarks about the 2011 earthquake and tsunami which had hit the Tohoku region.
