= Yūhei Satō =

Japanese politician

- 佐藤 雄平
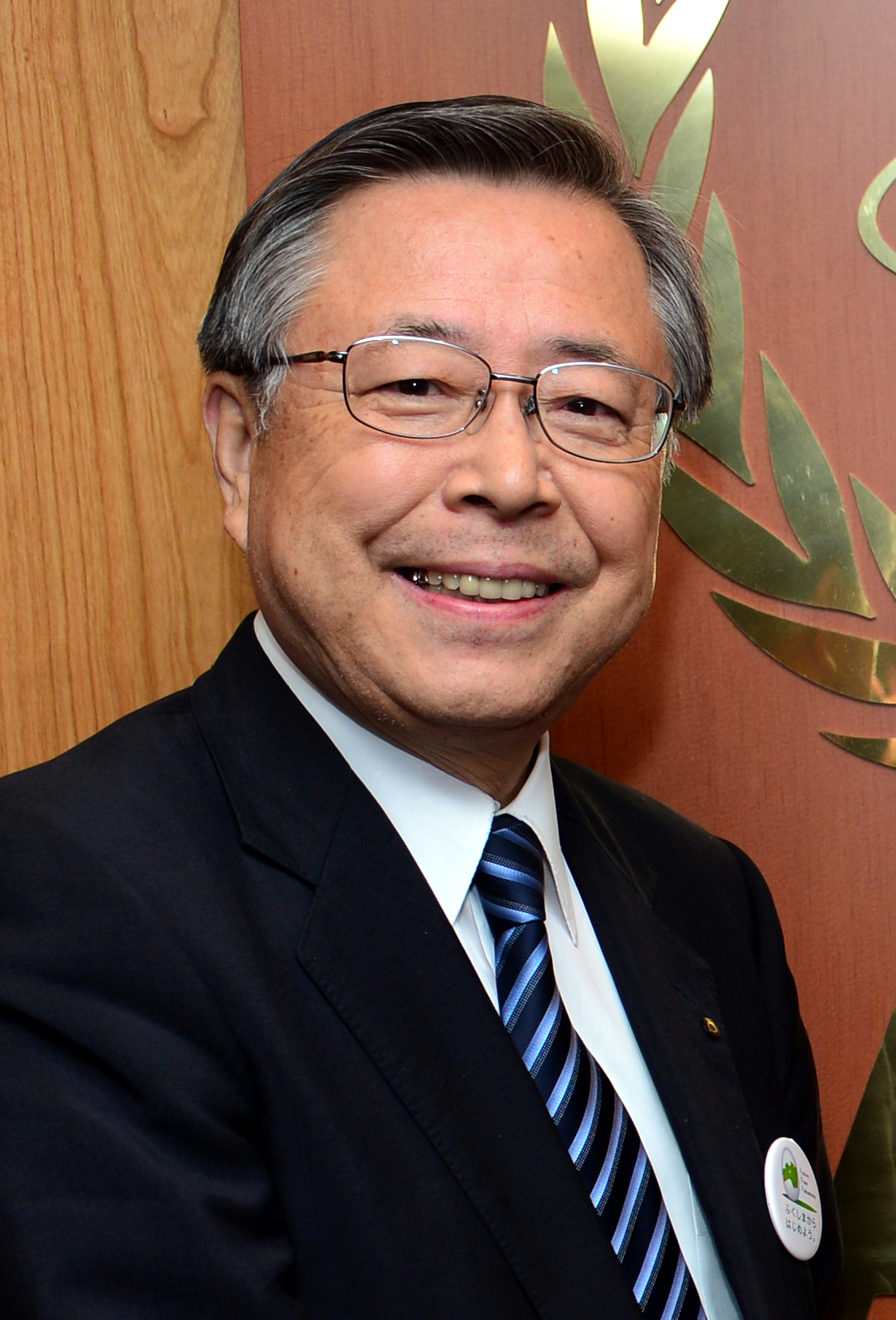
- Satō in 2012

Governor of Fukushima Prefecture
- In office 12 November 2006 – 11 November 2014
- Monarch: Akihito
- Preceded by: Eisaku Satō
- Succeeded by: Masao Uchibori

Member of the House of Councillors
- In office 26 July 1998 – 23 October 2006
- Preceded by: Seigo Suzuki
- Succeeded by: Teruhiko Mashiko
- Constituency: Fukushima at-large

Personal details
- Born: 12 December 1947 (age 78) Shimogō, Fukushima, Japan
- Party: Independent
- Other political affiliations: Democratic
- Relatives: Kōzō Watanabe (uncle)
- Education: Kanagawa University

Yūhei Satō (佐藤 雄平, Satō Yūhei; born 13 December 1947) is a former governor of Fukushima Prefecture, Japan. He was first elected in November 2006, after the previous governor, Eisaku Satō, was forced to step down after bribery charges. He chose not to seek a third term in the election held in October 2014, stating that he had made a mark on addressing the problems that Fukushima faced following the 2011 Tōhoku earthquake and tsunami and the resulting nuclear disaster, and that further rehabilitation efforts should take place under a new leader.
