= Nobuhiro Tanabe =

Japanese politician

- 田辺 信宏
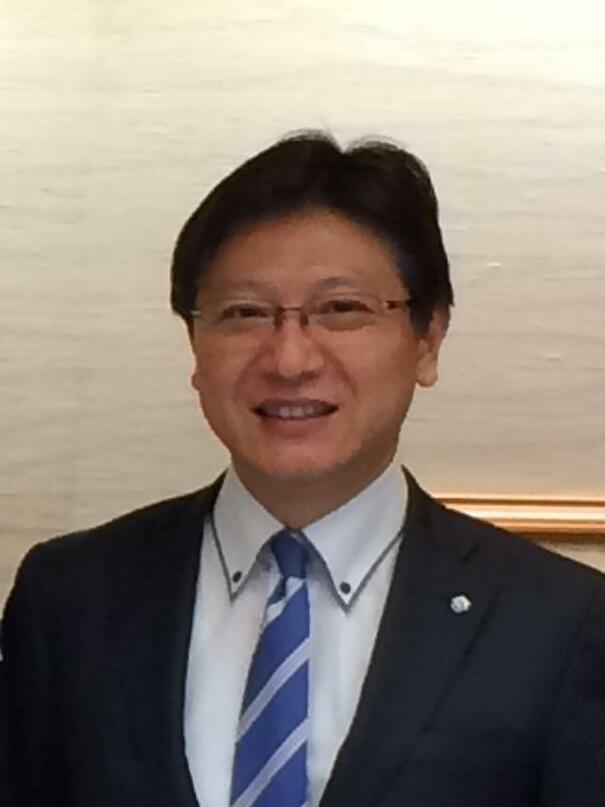

Mayor of Shizuoka
- In office 13 April 2011 – 12 April 2023
- Preceded by: Zenkichi Kojima
- Succeeded by: Takashi Namba

Member of the Shizuoka Prefectural Assembly
- In office 1995 – 25 September 2003
- Constituency: Shizuoka City

Member of the Shizuoka City Council
- In office April 1991 – 1995

Personal details
- Born: 20 August 1961 (age 65) Shizuoka, Japan
- Party: Independent
- Education: Waseda University
- Occupation: Politician

Nobuhiro Tanabe (田辺 信宏, Tanabe Nobuhiro; born 20 August 1961 in Shizuoka City) is a Japanese politician. He entered politics in 1991, and served as a member of the City Council for Shizuoka from 1995 to 2003. Tanabe became the mayor of Shizuoka City in 2011 and served for three terms until 2023.

Political offices
Preceded by Zenkichi Kojima	Mayor of Shizuoka City; 2011–2023	Succeeded by Takashi Namba
