= Tatsuo Sato (politician) =

Japanese politician (1937–2013)

- 佐藤 剛男
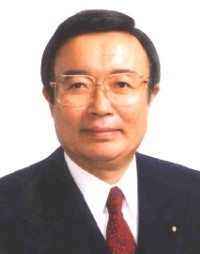
- Official portrait, 2003

Member of the House of Representatives
- In office 19 July 1993 – 21 July 2009
- Preceded by: Tokuo Satō
- Succeeded by: Multi-member district
- Constituency: Former Fukushima 1st (1993–1996); Fukushima 1st (1996–2005); Tohoku PR (2005–2009)

Personal details
- Born: 16 July 1937 Fukushima, Japan
- Died: 23 January 2013 (aged 75)
- Party: Liberal Democratic
- Education: University of Tokyo

Tatsuo Sato (佐藤 剛男, Satō Tatsuo; 19 July 1937 – 23 January 2013) was a Japanese politician of the Liberal Democratic Party who served as a member of the House of Representatives in the Diet (national legislature).

== Early life ==
Sato was a native of Fukushima, Fukushima. He attended the University of Tokyo and passed the bar exam while in the school. Upon graduation in 1961, he joined the Ministry of International Trade and Industry.

== Political career ==
Leaving the ministry in 1987, he ran unsuccessfully for the House of Representatives in 1990. He ran again in 1993 and was elected for the first time.
