= Eisaku Satō (governor) =

Japanese politician (1939–2025)

- 佐藤 栄佐久
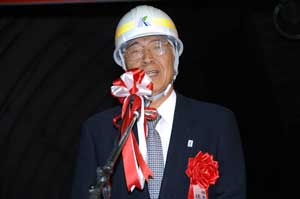
- Satō in 2006

Governor of Fukushima Prefecture
- In office 19 September 1988 – 28 September 2006
- Monarchs: Hirohito; Akihito
- Preceded by: Isao Mastudaira
- Succeeded by: Yūhei Satō

Member of the House of Councillors
- In office 10 July 1983 – 3 August 1988
- Preceded by: Shōichi Suzuki
- Succeeded by: Kentaro Ishihara
- Constituency: Fukushima at-large

Personal details
- Born: 24 June 1939 Kōriyama, Fukushima, Japan
- Died: 19 March 2025 (aged 85) Kōriyama, Fukushima, Japan
- Party: Liberal Democratic
- Education: University of Tokyo

Eisaku Satō (佐藤 栄佐久, Satō Eisaku; 24 June 1939 – 19 March 2025) was a Japanese politician who served as the governor of Fukushima Prefecture of Japan from 1988 to 2006.

== Life and career ==
Sato was initially an enthusiastic supporter of nuclear power. Like his predecessors he appreciated the jobs and subsidies associated with the nuclear plants in the prefecture. He believed it was part of Fukushima playing a role in the Japanese nation as a whole. In 1998, he conditionally agreed the controversial use of mixed oxide plutonium uranium fuel (MOX) at the Fukushima plant. He subsequently withdrew his support after discovering a cover-up of reactor malfunctions and cracks.

Between 2002 and 2006, twenty-one problems at the Fukushima plant were reported to his office. The whistleblowers, including some employees at the plant, bypassed both Tepco and Japan's Nuclear and Industrial Safety Agency because they feared that their information would go straight to Tepco. This was later shown to be a very justified fear. Sato became an increasingly bitter critic of the plant and Japan's entire energy policy as directed by NISA's powerful government overseer, the Ministry of Economy, Trade and Industry.

In 2006, Sato was forced to step down and in 2008 was prosecuted and convicted on bribery charges. He claimed the charges were politically motivated. Following his conviction, he wrote a book of his experiences called Annihilating a Governor explaining his concerns about nuclear power and how he was set up and wrongfully convicted. The book was largely ignored until the events of the Fukushima Daiichi nuclear disaster sent it rocketing up the bestseller list.

Satō died on 19 March 2025, at the age of 85 at a nursing home in Koriyama City, due to old age.
