= Yuko Sato (politician) =

Japanese politician

- 佐藤夕子

Member of the Nagoya City Council
- Incumbent
- Assumed office 13 April 2019
- Constituency: Higashi-ku
- In office 12 April 2015 – 4 October 2017
- Constituency: Higashi-ku

Member of the House of Representatives
- In office 30 August 2009 – 16 November 2012
- Preceded by: Takashi Kawamura
- Succeeded by: Hiromichi Kumada
- Constituency: Aichi 1st

Member of the Aichi Prefectural Assembly
- In office 30 April 2007 – 21 July 2009
- Constituency: Higashi Ward, Nagoya City

Personal details
- Born: January 6, 1963 (age 63) Nagoya, Aichi, Japan
- Party: Genzei Nippon (2013–2017; 2018–present)
- Other political affiliations: DPJ (2007–2011); TCJ (2011–2012); TPJ (2012–2013); KnT (2017–2018)
- Education: Junior College, Kinjo Gakuin University

Yuko Sato (佐藤夕子, Satō Yūko) is a Japanese politician and member of the Genzei Nippon party. She previously served one term in the House of Representatives of Japan's national Diet and currently serves on the Nagoya city council in Aichi Prefecture.

== Early life and career ==
Sato was born in Nagoya city, Aichi Prefecture. In 1983, she graduated from the Junior College of Kinjo Gakuin University and became a kindergarten teacher. In September 2006, she became a secretary to Democratic Party of Japan (DPJ) politician Takashi Kawamura, who represented Aichi 1st district in the House of Representatives of Japan's national Diet.

== Political career ==
Sato contested the Nagoya City Higashi district of the Aichi Prefectural Assembly as a DPJ candidate in the April 2007 general election and claimed 58% of the vote. In April 2009 resigned from the House of Representatives to contest the Nagoya mayoral election. Sato subsequently resigned from the Prefectural Assembly in July 2009 in order to contest Kawamura's seat as the DPJ candidate at the August 2009 general election. Sato won 54.4% of the vote in an election that brought the DPJ into power for the first time in its existence.

Sato lodged resignation papers with DPJ officials in March 2011 to allow her to campaign on behalf of Genzei Nippon ("Tax Reduction Japan"), a party formed by Kawamura in April 2010. The DPJ did not immediately accept her resignation and instead considered expelling her from the party, but eventually granted her request to leave in May 2011. This made her the new party's first member in the national Diet.

The national branch of Genzei Nippon, including Sato, merged with the Tomorrow Party of Japan in November 2012. Sato contested the December 2012 general election as a Tomorrow Party candidate and received 31% of the vote, but lost to Liberal Democratic Party candidate Hiromichi Kumada, who received 40% of the vote. The Tomorrow Party received only 7% of the vote in the Tokai proportional representation block, which meant they only received 1 of the 21 seats available. Fellow Tomorrow Party candidate Katsumasa Suzuki lost the Aichi 15th district by a smaller margin than Sato lost her district, which meant that Suzuki claimed the sole PR block seat and Sato lost her place in the Diet.

Sato returned to politics at the April 2015 unified local elections, winning one of the two seats in the Higashi district of the Nagoya city council and receiving 34.5% of the vote.
