= 2021 Nagoya mayoral election =

2019 Nagoya mayoral election
- April 25, 2021
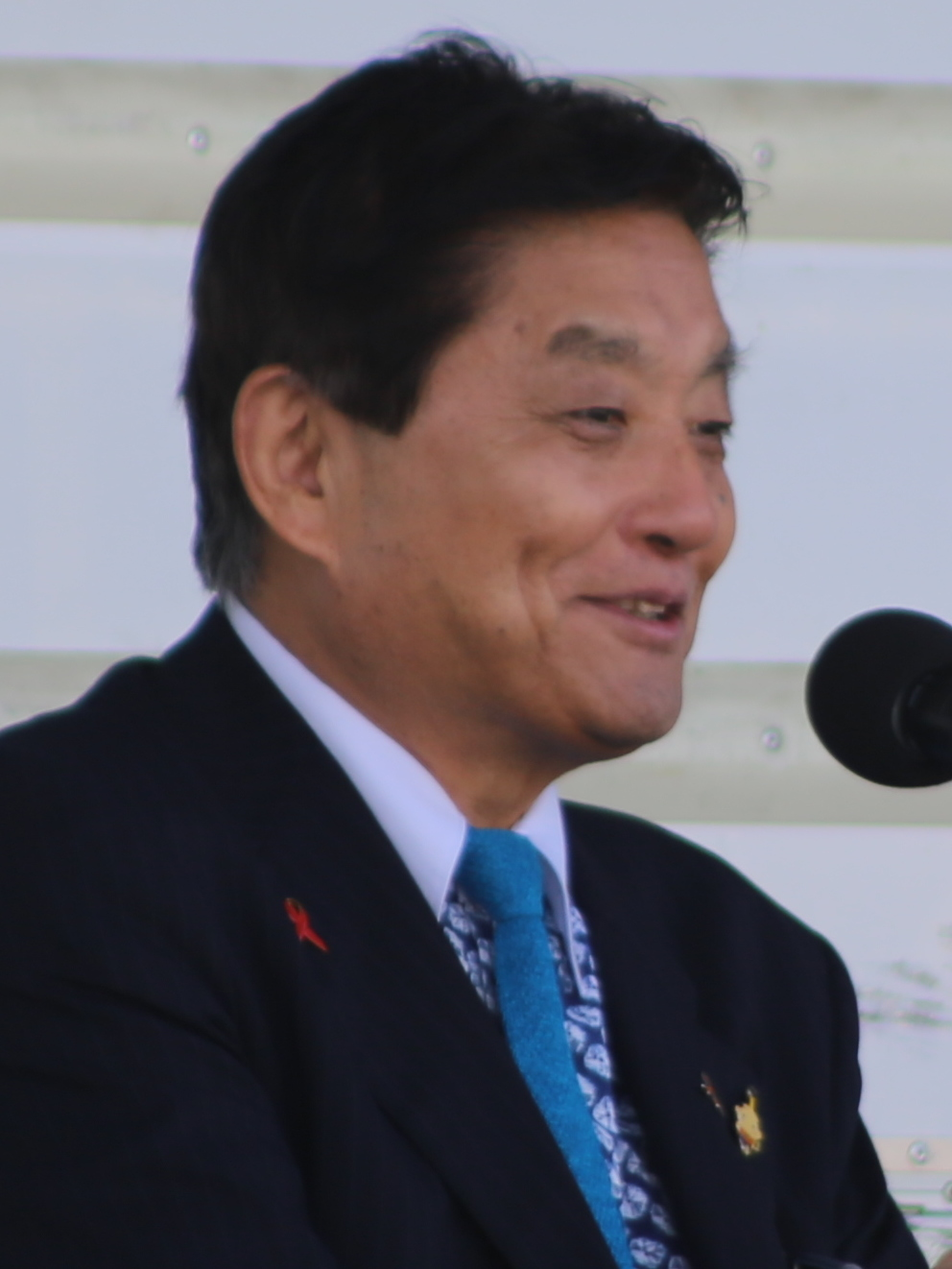

Candidate	Takashi Kawamura	Toshiaki Yokoi
Party	Independent	Independent
Popular vote	398,656	350,711
Percentage	51.68%	45.47%
Mayor before election
Takashi Kawamura
Elected mayor
Takashi Kawamura

The 2021 Nagoya mayoral election was held on April 25, 2021, to elect the mayor of Nagoya, Aichi, Japan. Incumbent Takashi Kawamura was re-elected for a fourth term.

== Overview ==
The election took place due to the expiration of the term of office of the incumbent, Takashi Kawamura (Genzei Nippon Party).

== Election data ==
- Reason for election：Expiration of term of office
- Official Announcement: April 11, 2021
- Election Day: April 25, 2021

== Candidates ==
（In order of announcement）

Name	Age	Party	Title	Official Website
Takashi Kawamura (河村たかし)	72	Independent （Endorsed by Genzei Nippon）	Mayor of Nagoya（Current）	Kawamura Takashi Official Website (Japanese)
Seiichi Oshikoshi (押越清悦)	62	Independent	NPO Director	Oshikoshi Seiichi Twitter Account (Wake Up Japan Party) (Japanese)
Toshiaki Yokoi (横井利明)	59	Independent （Endorsed by the Liberal Democratic Party, Komeito, Constitutional Democratic Party of Japan, Democratic Party for the People and Aichi Prefectural Branch of the Japan Trade Union Confederation)	Former Nagoya City Council member representing Minami Ward	Yokoi Toshiaki Official Website (Japanese)
Toshimitsu Ota (太田敏光)	72	Independent	Former Toyota employee	Ota Toshimitsu's Nagoya City Council Watch (Japanese)

=== Timeline ===
2021

- January 7 – Keiko Ogata announces intention to run.
- January 21 – Nagoya City Election Administration Commission announces April 11 as the date for the start of the campaign and April 25 as election day.
