= Hiromichi Kumada =

Japanese politician

- 熊田 裕通
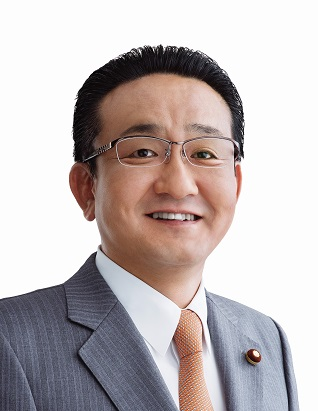
- Official portrait, 2020

Member of the House of Representatives
- Incumbent
- Assumed office 9 February 2026
- Preceded by: Multi-member district
- Constituency: Tokai PR
- In office 18 December 2012 – 9 October 2024
- Preceded by: Yuko Sato
- Succeeded by: Takashi Kawamura
- Constituency: Aichi 1st

Member of the Aichi Prefectural Assembly
- In office 30 April 1995 – November 2012
- Constituency: Nagoya City Nishi Ward

Personal details
- Born: 28 January 1964 (age 62) Nishi-ku, Nagoya, Aichi, Japan
- Party: Liberal Democratic
- Other political affiliations: New Frontier
- Education: Kanagawa University

Hiromichi Kumada is a Japanese politician who is serving as a member of the House of Representatives of Japan.

== Biography ==
He graduated from Faculty of Law, Kanagawa University.
