= Opinion polling for the 2026 Japanese general election =

In the run up to the 2026 Japanese general election, various organisations carried out opinion polling to gauge voting intention. Results of such polls are displayed in this article. The date range for these opinion polls is from the 2024 Japanese general election, held on 27 October, to the election day.

== Pollsters ==
The following table shows the pollsters who conduct opinion polls in Japan.

Pollster	Method	Database
ANN	RDD	https://www.tv-asahi.co.jp/hst/poll/
Asahi	RDD	https://www.asahi.com/yoron/database/
Jiji Press	Personal interview	https://www.jiji.com/jc/v7?id=2025jijiyoron
JNN	RDD	https://newsdig.tbs.co.jp/list/search?fulltext=JNN世論調査
Kyodo News (Note: Database from Chunichi Shimbun.)	RDD	https://www.chunichi.co.jp/digican/shuin2024_yoron
Mainichi	D-survey (Note: Online (smartphone based))	https://mainichi.jp/opinion-research
SSRC	D-survey	https://ssrc.jp/research/
NHK	RDD	https://www.nhk.or.jp/senkyo/shijiritsu/
Nikkei	RDD	https://vdata.nikkei.com/newsgraphics/cabinet-approval-rating/
TV Tokyo	RDD	https://txbiz.tv-tokyo.co.jp/search/detail?search_word=テレ東･日経世論調査
Sankei	RDD	https://www.sankei.com/politics/poll/
FNN	RDD	https://www.fnn.jp/subcategory/opinion_poll
Senkyo.com	RDD/Online (Note: Not included in this article.)	https://go2senkyo.com/research/
Yomiuri	RDD	https://www.yomiuri.co.jp/election/yoron-chosa/
NNN	RDD	https://www.ntv.co.jp/yoron/

== Party identification ==

=== 2026 ===
Fieldwork date	Polling firm	Sample size	LDP	CRA		Ishin	DPP	Reiwa	JCP	Sansei	CPJ	SDP	Mirai	Others	No party	Und./ no ans.	Lead
Fieldwork date	Polling firm	Sample size	LDP	CDP	Komei	Ishin	DPP	Reiwa	JCP	Sansei	CPJ	SDP	Mirai	Others	No party	Und./ no ans.	Lead
8 Feb	Election results	55.7% (Note: Election turnout.)	36.7	18.2		8.6	9.7	2.9	4.4	7.4	2.5	1.3	6.7	1.4 (Note: Genyu: 1.42%; Others: 0.02%)	–		18.5
6–7 Feb	Kyodo News (Note: Trend Survey)	1,054	43.7	12 (Note: CDP: 1.2%; Komeito: 0.8%; CRA: 10%)		7.5	6.6	1.1	3.9	5.1	2.1	0.5	3.2	1.9 (Note: Genyu: 1.2%; The Collaborative Party: 0.3%; Others: 0.4%)	9.8	2.6	31.7
2–4 Feb	Senkyo.com/JX	1,051	26.2	11.2		6.2	5.1	1.7	3.6	3.8	1.7	1.1	2.1	1.8 (Note: Genyu: 1%; Others: 0.8%)	35.6	–	9.4
31 Jan – 1 Feb	Kyodo News	1,048	42.3	15.8 (Note: CDP: 0.8%; Komeito: 1.5%; CRA: 13.5%)		3.8	6	2	1.4	6.1	1.5	0.9	3.3	0.5 (Note: Genyu: 0.3%; The Collaborative Party: 0.1%; Others: 0.1%)	11.9	4.5	26.5
31 Jan – 1 Feb	JNN	1,038	34.7	9.3 (Note: CDP: 0.5%; Komeito: 0.3%; CRA: 8.5%)		3.9	5.1	1.4	2.2	4	0.8	0	1.2	0.5 (Note: Genyu: 0.4%; Others: 0.1%)	29.5	7.4	5.2
30 Jan – 1 Feb	NHK	2,521	35.7	11.6 (Note: CDP: 0.3%; Komeito: 1%; CRA: 10.3%)		3.7	4.1	1.1	2.1	3.5	1	0.6	1.1	0.4 (Note: Genyu: 0.3%; Others: 0.1%)	27.2	8	8.5
24–25 Jan	Sankei/FNN	1,013	36	8.6 (Note: CDP: 1.1%; Komeito: 0.7%; CRA: 6.8%)		3.8	3.5	1.6	2.3	3.3	0.7	0.6	0.4	–	29.8	9.4	6.2
24–25 Jan	ANN	1,027	36.1	15.3 (Note: CDP: 3%; Komeito: 1.6%; CRA: 10.7%)		5.2	6.3	1.7	2.7	4.4	0.9	0.5	1	1	20.9	4.1	15.2
24–25 Jan	Mainichi/SSRC	2,048	27	15 (Note: CDP: 2%; Komeito: 1%; CRA: 12%)		4	7	1	2	4	1	1	3	–	35	–	8
24–25 Jan	Kyodo News	1,062	38.7	12.9 (Note: CDP: 1.3%; Komeito: 1.5%; CRA: 10.1%)		5.4	9.9	1.8	2.7	4.7	1	0.7	2.1	0.6 (Note: The Collaborative Party: 0.3%; Others: 0.3%)	15.3	4.2	23.4
23–25 Jan	NHK	1,564	35.9	11.9 (Note: CDP: 2.3%; Komeito: 1.7%; CRA: 7.9%)		3.3	4.4	0.7	2.6	3.5	0.5	0.4	0.8	0.1	25.7	10.1	10.2
23–25 Jan	Nikkei/TV Tokyo	977	42	11 (Note: CDP: 3%; CRA: 8%)		5	7	1	1	6	1	0	2	–	19	3	23
23–25 Jan	Yomiuri/NNN	1,034	35	7 (Note: CDP: 1%; Komeito: 1%; CRA: 5%)		3	6	1	2	4	1	1	1	1	31	5	4
23 Jan	Sanae Takaichi dissolves the House of Representatives. A general election is called for 8 February 2026.																
17–18 Jan	Asahi	1,228	29	10 (Note: CDP: 5%; Komeito: 2%; CRA: 3%)		3	5	1	2	4	1	0	0	–	37	8	8
17–18 Jan	Senkyo.com/JX	1,043	27.4	12.2		4.8	6.1	2.5	4.1	5	1.9	0.4	1.1	1.2	33.4	–	6
15 Jan	CDP and Komeito agree to contest the general election together as a new party, the Centrist Reform Alliance.																
10–12 Jan	NHK	1,213	32.2	7	2.6	3.7	4.6	1	2.5	2.6	0.7	0.4	0.1	0.3	37	5.3	4.8
9–12 Jan	Jiji Press	1,170	22.5	4.2	2.5	2.3	3.6	0.9	1.1	3.4	1.1	0.1	0.2	–	55.2	2.9	32.7
10–11 Jan	JNN	1,015	29.7	5	2.8	5	6.3	1.2	1.1	3.7	0.8	0.2	0.1	0.3	40.3	3.5	10.6

=== 2025 ===
Fieldwork date	Polling firm	Sample size	LDP	CDP	Ishin	DPP	Komei	Reiwa	JCP	Sansei	CPJ	SDP	Mirai	Others	No party	Und./ no ans.	Lead
20–21 Dec	Sankei/FNN	1,021	30.6	4.5	3.8	5.7	2.4	1.2	2.3	5.1	1.3	0.3	0.2	–	39	3.6	8.4
20–21 Dec	Asahi	1,195	30	5	4	7	2	1	2	5	1	0	1	–	36	6	6
20–21 Dec	Mainichi/SSRC	1,907	27	7	5	7	2	2	2	5	2	1	1	–	40	–	13
20–21 Dec	Kyodo News	1,040	31.1	7.8	8	7.8	2.5	2.2	3.4	4.4	1.4	0.8	2.5	1.7 (Note: The Collaborative Party: 0.9%; Others: 0.8%)	24.3	2.1	6.8
19–21 Dec	Nikkei/TV Tokyo	916	37	7	7	9	3	2	1	5	1	0	0	–	23	5	14
19–21 Dec	Yomiuri/NNN	1,034	30	4	4	7	3	2	1	4	1	0	0	–	41	3	11
13–14 Dec	ANN	1,040	36.7	9.9	6.6	6.5	3.9	2.5	3	3.3	0.9	0.6	0.3	0.6	22.3	2.8	14.4
13–14 Dec	Senkyo.com/JX	1,036	26.4	7.9	5	4.4	5.1	1.5	4.3	5	2.2	0.9	1.5	2.9	33	–	6.6
5–8 Dec	Jiji Press	1,132	20.9	4	3.6	3.4	3.6	0.7	0.9	3	0.9	0.2	0.4	–	55.1	3.3	34.2
6–7 Dec	JNN	1,021	29.5	6.3	5	4.1	2.7	1.5	1.8	4.3	1.2	0.2	0.5	0.5	39.5	2.9	10
5–7 Dec	NHK	1,192	30.6	6	2.5	2.9	3.4	1.3	1.9	3.1	0.4	0.4	0.3	0.8	41.4	5.1	10.8
28–30 Nov	Nikkei/TV Tokyo	1,006	41	6	5	6	3	3	2	7	1	1	1	–	22	2	19
22–23 Nov	Sankei/FNN	1,020	27.6	5.3	3.8	4	3	1.7	2	4.5	1	0.3	0.2	–	41	5.6	13.4
22–23 Nov	Mainichi/SSRC	1,985	25	9	6	6	3	2	3	5	2	0	1	–	38	–	13
21–23 Nov	Yomiuri/NNN	1,054	32	5	4	4	4	2	2	5	0	0	0	–	40	3	8
15–16 Nov	Asahi	1,215	29	5	3	4	4	1	2	5	1	1	0	–	39	6	10
15–16 Nov	ANN	1,058	42	7.1	4.8	5.1	4.1	2.3	3.3	4.1	1.1	0.5	0.4	0.9	22.6	1.8	19.4
15–16 Nov	Senkyo.com/JX	1,003	25.5	7.8	5.9	5.1	3.9	2.9	2.3	5.6	2.5	1.2	1	1.5	34.9	–	9.4
15–16 Nov	Kyodo News	1,046	30	8.3	7.4	8.8	3.1	3.2	3.7	7.3	0.9	0.6	1.2	0.8 (Note: The Collaborative Party: 0.1%; Others: 0.7%)	23	1.7	7
7–10 Nov	Jiji Press	1,182	21.8	3.6	2.9	3.5	3.2	1.8	0.9	4	0.9	0	0.6	–	54.4	2.4	32.6
7–9 Nov	NHK	1,213	30.7	7.2	3.3	3.5	2.6	0.9	2.6	3.4	0.7	0.2	0.2	0.5	38.7	5.4	8
1–2 Nov	JNN	1,013	28.9	5.5	3.9	3.6	3.2	1.8	2.8	4.7	0.6	0.2	0.1	0.2	41	3.5	12.1
25–26 Oct	Sankei/FNN	1,021	28.1	6.3	5.7	4.6	2.7	2.7	1.2	5	1.1	0.7	0.6	–	38.4	2.9	10.3
25–26 Oct	Asahi	1,342	30	5	5	6	2	2	2	4	1	0	0	–	36	7	6
25–26 Oct	ANN	1,058	37.4	9	7.4	6.2	3.8	2.4	2.4	3.5	0.9	0.8	0.6	1.5	21.5	2.5	15.9
25–26 Oct	Mainichi/SSRC	2,045	26	7	8	5	2	2	2	5	2	1	2	–	39	–	13
24–26 Oct	Nikkei/TV Tokyo	1,059	36	7	9	6	4	2	2	6	1	0	1	–	22	3	14
21–22 Oct	Yomiuri/NNN	1,057	32	6	5	5	4	1	1	7	1	1	1	1	34	3	2
21–22 Oct	Kyodo News	1,053	31.4	8.4	8.3	8.8	3.8	3.1	3.1	6.8	2.4	1.1	1	0.5 (Note: The Collaborative Party: 0.4%; Others: 0.1%)	19.8	1.5	11.6
21 Oct	Sanae Takaichi succeeds Shigeru Ishiba as Prime Minister of Japan. The Takaichi Cabinet is formed.																
20 Oct	The LDP and Ishin agree to sign a confidence and supply agreement.																
11–13 Oct	NHK	1,205	27.4	5.6	1.7	4.8	3.2	1.2	2.6	4.5	0.7	0.2	0.4	–	41	6.6	13.6
10–13 Oct	Jiji Press	1,164	19.7	4.2	1.8	3.8	2.8	1.5	0.9	4.8	0.9	0.6	0.7	–	56.1	2.2	36.4
11–12 Oct	Senkyo.com/JX	1,013	23.4	9.9	3.3	7.5	4.6	2.9	3.3	7.1	2.3	0.7	0.9	0.6	33.7	–	10.3
10 Oct	Komeito leaves the governing minority coalition.																
4–6 Oct	Kyodo News	1,061	33.8	8.8	5.1	9.6	4.3	1.9	3.1	8.1	2.5	0.9	0.6	0.6 (Note: The Collaborative Party: 0.3%; Others: 0.3%)	18	2.7	15.8
4–5 Oct	JNN	1,036	27.9	5.8	3.6	7.6	2	1.8	2.2	5.8	1.1	0.5	0.6	0.1	36.7	4.3	8.8
4 Oct	Sanae Takaichi is elected President of the LDP.																
27–28 Sep	ANN	1,025	33.2	7.7	3.2	7.5	3.5	2.7	3.6	7.8	1.1	1.2	0	1.1	23.2	4.1	10
26–28 Sep	Nikkei/TV Tokyo	915	31	7	4	9	3	3	4	10	1	1	0	–	24	3	7
20–21 Sep	Sankei/FNN	1,018	27.9	6.3	3.4	6.5	2.5	2.9	2.1	8.3	1.2	0.2	0.9	–	33.6	4.2	5.7
20–21 Sep	Asahi	1,176	26	5	2	7	2	2	2	8	1	1	0	–	38	6	12
20–21 Sep	Mainichi/SSRC	1,972	19	9	4	10	2	3	2	8	2	1	1	1	38	–	19
12–15 Sep	Jiji Press	1,162	17.1	5.3	2	3.4	3	1.4	1.8	5.9	1.6	0	0.6	–	54.5	3.4	37.4
13–14 Sep	Senkyo.com/JX	995	27.9	10.9	3.9	3.6	3.6	2	4.2	7.4	2	1.2	0.5	–	32.7	–	4.8
13–14 Sep	Yomiuri/NNN	1,043	27	5	2	9	3	3	2	8	1	1	0	–	35	4	8
11–12 Sep	Kyodo News	1,040	23.5	10.2	4.2	10.5	2.2	3.8	3.6	10.9	3.5	0.8	2.3	0.5 (Note: The Collaborative Party: 0.1%; Others: 0.4%)	21.3	2.7	2.2
7 Sep	Shigeru Ishiba announces he will resign as President of the LDP. The 2025 LDP presidential election is scheduled for 4 October 2025.																
6–7 Sep	Kyodo News	1,045	23.4	7.6	6.2	9.8	4.8	4.9	3.8	11.6	2.4	0.6	2.7	0.9 (Note: The Collaborative Party: 0.6%; Others: 0.3%)	19.1	2.2	4.3
6–7 Sep	JNN	1,030	23.3	6.5	4.7	6.8	3.2	2.7	2.4	8.5	2.4	0.5	0.5	0.9	32.7	4.9	9.4
5–7 Sep	NHK	1,186	27.9	5	3.6	5.7	3.1	1.7	2.9	6.3	1.8	0.8	0.4	0.6	34.8	5.4	6.9
29–31 Aug	Nikkei/TV Tokyo	955	28	7	6	11	3	4	2	11	2	0	1	–	20	5	8
23–24 Aug	Sankei/FNN	1,022	22.2	5.2	4	9.3	4.2	3.9	2.8	9.9	2.4	0.3	1	0.8	30.7	3.3	8.5
23–24 Aug	ANN	1,012	29.7	8.2	5.5	9.3	3.7	3	3.5	8.5	2.1	1.2	0.6	1.6	20.7	2.6	9
23–24 Aug	Mainichi/SSRC	2,046	17	10	4	9	2	3	2	9	2	1	2	–	38	1	21
23–24 Aug	Kyodo News	1,056	22.5	10.4	7.3	10.4	3.2	6.3	3.8	11.2	2.2	1.3	3	0.8 (Note: The Collaborative Party: 0.3%; Others: 0.5%)	14.6	3	7.9
22–24 Aug	Yomiuri/NNN	991	23	7	4	9	4	3	2	12	2	0	1	–	32	2	9
16–17 Aug	Asahi	1,211	20	5	4	10	3	3	3	9	2	0	1	1	35	4	15
16–17 Aug	Senkyo.com/JX	1,000	28	14.3	4.6	4.3	5.6	2.6	5.7	5.5	2.2	1.1	1	–	25.1	–	2.9
9–11 Aug	NHK	1,137	29.4	6.9	3.2	7.1	2.9	2.4	3.4	6.8	1.6	0.4	0.6	0.4	29.6	5.5	0.2
8–11 Aug	Jiji Press	1,138	15.7	5.5	2.4	6.8	3.7	1.5	1.8	7.6	1.6	0.5	0.6	–	50	2.3	34.3
8 Aug	Fumitake Fujita succeed Seiji Maehara as co-leader of Ishin.																
2–3 Aug	JNN	1,003	20.4	6.9	2.7	8.7	4	3.1	2.1	10.2	1.8	0.3	1.6	1	33.2	4	12.8
26–27 Jul	Sankei/FNN	1,030	21	6.8	2.6	13.9	4	3.7	2.4	9.8	2.3	0.9	1.5	0.5	27.3	3.4	6.3
26–27 Jul	Asahi	1,250	20	7	4	8	4	3	3	10	2	1	1	1	30	6	10
26–27 Jul	ANN	1,020	31.6	10.7	4.5	7.1	4.3	3.6	3.1	10.7	1.5	0.5	0.9	0.7	16.6	4.1	15
26–27 Jul	Mainichi/SSRC	2,045	19	9	4	12	3	4	2	8	3	1	2	1	33	–	14
25–27 Jul	Nikkei/TV Tokyo	937	24	9	5	12	3	4	2	13	3	1	2	–	17	5	7
21–22 Jul	Kyodo News	1,049	20.7	10.8	5.2	15.1	4.6	4.3	3.7	11.8	2.7	1.3	4.1	0.8 (Note: The Collaborative Party: 0.2%; Others: 0.6%)	12.3	2.6	8.4
21–22 Jul	Yomiuri/NNN	1,043	19	8	3	11	4	3	2	12	1	0	2	1	29	5	10
20 Jul	HoC election	58.51%	21.6	12.5	7.4	12.9	8.8	6.6	4.8	12.5	5	2.1	2.6	3.2	–		8.7

Fieldwork date	Polling firm	Sample size	LDP	CDP	Ishin	DPFP	Komei	Reiwa	JCP	Sansei	CPJ	SDP	Others	No party	Und./ no ans.	Lead
11–14 Jul	Jiji Press	1,180	16.4	5.5	1.5	3.1	3.1	2.1	1.6	4.7	1.1	0.3	–	54.9	5.7	38.5
12–13 Jul	Senkyo.com/JX	991	30.8	15.3	3.5	4.1	4.1	2.1	4.3	5.3	2.1	1.9	0.1 (Note: The Collaborative Party: 0.1%)	26.1	0.3	4.7
11–13 Jul	NHK	1,913	24	7.8	3.1	4.9	3.5	2.8	3	5.9	1.4	0.7	0.7	33.7	8.6	9.7
5–6 Jul	ANN	1,048	30.2	10.4	4.5	6.4	5.2	3.3	4.4	6.6	1.1	0.5	2.4 (Note: NHK Party: 0.3%; The Path to Rebirth: 0.6%; Team Mirai: 0.1%; Others: 1.3%)	19.8	5.2	10.4
5–6 Jul	Kyodo News	1,253	21.9	9.1	4.8	10.3	4.9	4.1	3	9.2	2.5	0.9	1.5	18.2	9.6	3.7
5–6 Jul	JNN	1,010	20.8	6.3	4.1	5.9	3.9	3.2	1.7	6.2	1.1	0.8	0.8	40	5.2	19.2
4–6 Jul	NHK	1,913	28.1	8.5	2.3	5.1	3	3.2	3.1	4.2	1	0.5	0.6 (Note: The Collaborative Party: 0.1%; Others: 0.5%)	30.1	10.4	2
3–4 Jul	Asahi	11,164	19	7	3	6	3	3	3	5						
28–29 Jun	Kyodo News	1,254	25.5	11.4	4.3	8.1	3.7	3.7	2.8	8.4	1.3	0.8	0.9 (Note: The Collaborative Party: 0.5%; Others: 0.4%)	19.6	9.5	5.9
28–29 Jun	Mainichi/SSRC	2,050	19	9	4	9	2	4	2	6	1	1	1	42	–	23
27–29 Jun	Nikkei/TV Tokyo	775	31	10	4	10	4	4	3	7	1	1	1	22	3	9
27–29 Jun	Yomiuri/NNN	1,061	23	6	2	5	3	2	3	5	1	0	1	43	6	20
27–29 Jun	NHK	1,816	27	8.4	2.1	5.8	3.8	2	2.9	3.1	0.8	0.7	0.3	32.4	10.8	5.4
21–22 Jun	ANN	1,031	31.1	9.7	3.1	6.4	3.5	5.8	4.1	3.6	0.9	0.6	2.3 (Note: NHK Party: 0.4%; Others: 1.9%)	23.7	5.2	7.4
21–22 Jun	Kyodo News	1,050	29.7	9.2	4.8	9.9	4.4	5.6	3.1	3.7	2.9	1.9	0.3 (Note: The Collaborative Party: 0.1%; Others: 0.2%)	21.1	3.4	8.6
13–16 Jun	Jiji Press	1,162	18.9	4.4	1.6	3.4	2.8	1.5	1.4	2.5	0.7	0.4	–	58.2	4.2	39.3
14–15 Jun	Sankei/FNN	1,027	24.7	6.8	2.7	7.9	3.3	3.5	2.6	3.9	0.6	0.3	0.5	36.7	6.5	12
14–15 Jun	Asahi	1,256	23	7	2	6	3	4	2	3	1	0	1	40	8	17
14–15 Jun	Senkyo.com/JX	990	29.4	13.7	2.8	4.6	3.6	2.1	4.4	2.6	1.9	1	0.3 (Note: The Collaborative Party: 0.3%)	33.3	0.3	3.9
14–15 Jun	Kyodo News	1,049	27.7	7.9	4.9	10.6	4.4	3.7	2.8	4.8	1.4	1	1.2 (Note: The Collaborative Party: 0.7%; Others: 0.5%)	27.6	2	0.1
7–8 Jun	ANN	1,025	32.2	10.4	4.6	7.5	4.5	3.6	3.4	1.9	0.7	0.8	1	25.8	3.7	6.4
6–8 Jun	NHK	1,201	31.6	5.8	2.5	5.4	3.2	1.7	1.9	1.9	0.9	0.4	0.8 (Note: The Collaborative Party: 0.1%; Others: 0.7%)	37.8	6.1	6.2
31 May – 1 Jun	JNN	1,056	24.3	8.2	2.3	6.8	2.9	3.1	2.2	2.1	0.7	0.1	0.9	42.2	4.2	17.9
24–25 May	Kyodo News	1,064	28.4	12.1	6.5	14.1	4.5	4.7	2.6	2.4	0.9	0.5	1.2 (Note: The Collaborative Party: 0.9%; Others: 0.3%)	19.4	2.7	9
23–25 May	Nikkei/TV Tokyo	892	28	9	6	11	5	5	2	3	1	0	–	27	4	1
16–19 May	Jiji Press	1,176	17.2	4.4	2.3	5.7	3.7	1.9	0.9	0.9	0.7	0.3	–	58.5	3.5	41.3
17–18 May	Sankei/FNN	1,025	24.8	6.2	3.6	8.4	3.5	3.7	3.4	1.3	1	0.4	0.2	37.2	6.4	12.4
17–18 May	Asahi	1,209	24	7	2	8	3	3	2	2	1	0	–	40	8	16
17–18 May	Senkyo.com/JX	986	27	13.5	3.5	7.4	4	1.6	4.3	2.5	2.4	1.1	0.2 (Note: The Collaborative Party: 0.2%)	32.3	–	5.3
17–18 May	Kyodo News	1,064	25	12.1	4.9	13.2	4.7	6.5	3.9	2.6	1.5	1.1	0.5 (Note: The Collaborative Party: 0.4%; Others: 0.1%)	21.2	2.8	3.8
17–18 May	Mainichi/SSRC	2,045	16	9	4	13	2	5	2	2	2	1	–	42	2	26
16–18 May	Yomiuri/NNN	1,072	25	6	2	11	2	4	1	1	1	0	–	41	4	16
10–11 May	ANN	1,016	33.8	9.8	3.4	11.7	3.3	4.6	2.9	0.9	0.5	0.6	0.9	24.6	3	9.2
9–11 May	NHK	1,216	26.4	7.6	2.6	7.2	3.7	2.5	2.6	1.5	0.8	0.3	0.3	38.2	6.1	11.8
3–4 May	JNN	1,026	23.5	5.6	4.3	10.2	4	3.5	2.4	1.6	0.6	0.1	0.6	36.7	6.9	13.2
19–21 Apr	Nikkei/TV Tokyo	799	31	10	4	14	3	4	2	1	1	1	–	25	4	6
19–20 Apr	Sankei/FNN	1,015	22.9	7.6	2.8	11.4	2.6	3.7	2.5	1.4	0.9	0.6	0.7	39.4	3.6	16.5
19–20 Apr	Asahi	1,240	23	7	3	12	3	3	2	1	1	0	1	37	7	14
19–20 Apr	ANN	1,030	34.8	11	3.4	11.4	2.8	3.5	3.8	0.5	0.9	1.2	1.3	21.7	3.8	13.1
11–14 Apr	Jiji Press	1,140	17.4	3.8	3.1	5.4	3	2.2	1.5	1.1	0.7	0.1	–	58.2	3.5	40.8
12–13 Apr	Senkyo.com/JX	995	27.7	12.9	3.7	7.7	3.2	3.2	4.6	1.5	1	1.3	0.1 (Note: The Collaborative Party: 0.1%)	33	–	5.3
12–13 Apr	Kyodo News	1,051	25.8	11.9	4.9	18.4	4.2	4.8	3.4	1	1.9	0.7	0.2 (Note: The Collaborative Party: 0.2%)	20.1	2.7	5.7
12–13 Apr	Mainichi/SSRC	2,040	18	10	3	15	3	5	2	0	0	0	–	41	3	23
11–13 Apr	Yomiuri/NNN	1,026	28	6	2	13	3	3	2	1	1	0	–	37	4	9
11–13 Apr	NHK	1,120	29.7	5.8	2.4	7.9	3.8	2.6	2.1	1	0.6	0.4	0.1 (Note: The Collaborative Party: 0.1%)	36.9	6.6	7.2
5–6 Apr	JNN	1,031	23.9	8.4	2.9	10.7	2.8	4.6	2	0.9	0.8	0.3	0.5	39.7	2.5	15.8
22–23 Mar	Sankei/FNN	1,013	20.8	6.9	3.4	11.1	2.7	5.2	2.2	1.3	1	0.4	–	40.6	4.4	19.8
22–23 Mar	ANN	1,025	29.4	11.8	5.7	11.4	3.9	4.2	3.5	0.6	1.1	0.6	1	22.9	3.9	6.5
22–23 Mar	Kyodo News	1,046	27.7	11.1	5.4	12.9	3.8	7	3.6	1.3	0.3	0.8	0.3 (Note: The Collaborative Party: 0.1%; Others: 0.2%)	23	2.8	4.7
21–23 Mar	Nikkei/TV Tokyo	847	32	10	7	13	2	5	2	1	1	0	–	22	4	10
15–16 Mar	Senkyo.com/JX	998	26.7	14.2	3.3	9.6	3.3	2.8	4.6	1.4	1.4	1.3	–	31.4	–	4.7
15–16 Mar	Asahi	1,137	23	7	3	11	3	3	1	1	1	0	–	38	9	15
15–16 Mar	Mainichi/SSRC	2,047	19	11	4	16	2	5	1	1	1	0	–	39	1	20
14–16 Mar	Yomiuri/NNN	1,023	26	6	3	12	2	3	1	0	1	0	–	40	5	14
7–10 Mar	Jiji Press	1,186	17.9	4.2	2.4	8	3.5	1.9	1.3	0.5	0.9	0.3	–	54.8	4.3	36.9
7–9 Mar	NHK	1,225	29.2	7.5	3	8.4	2.9	2.8	1.8	1	1.1	0.2	0.4	35.7	6	6.5
1–2 Mar	JNN	1,027	25.6	5.6	3.6	10.9	2.7	4.1	2.2	0.4	0.2	0.1	0.7	39	4.9	13.4
22–23 Feb	Sankei/FNN	1,028	26.4	6.9	5.7	9.8	2.7	5.2	2.1	1	0.5	0.3	–	35.3	4.1	8.9
22–23 Feb	ANN	1,034	33.2	11.5	4.7	8.8	5.2	5.1	3.3	1.1	0.4	1.1	0.6	21.7	3.1	11.5
21–23 Feb	Nikkei/TV Tokyo	847	30	11	6	13	4	6	2	0	1	0	–	21	5	9
15–16 Feb	Senkyo.com/JX	1,004	27.5	15.1	4.8	5.9	3.7	2.7	4.5	0.9	1.8	1.2	0.2 (Note: The Collaborative Party: 0.2%)	31.8	–	4.3
15–16 Feb	Asahi	1,111	25	7	2	10	3	4	2	1	1	0	–	36	9	11
15–16 Feb	Kyodo News	1,063	30.6	10.4	7.6	10.8	3.2	7.3	2.3	1.4	1.5	0.7	0.4 (Note: The Collaborative Party: 0.4%)	18.5	5.3	12.1
15–16 Feb	Mainichi/SSRC	2,043	18	10	5	14	3	5	2	0	0	0	–	39	4	21
14–16 Feb	Yomiuri/NNN	1,033	26	8	3	8	3	4	2	0	0	0	1	39	4	13
7–9 Feb	NHK	1,212	31.3	9.2	3.2	6.8	3.5	2.1	2.2	0.5	1	0.8	0.2 (Note: The Collaborative Party: 0.2%)	32.8	6.5	1.5
6–9 Feb	Jiji Press	1,126	17.9	5.4	2	6.1	3.8	1.9	1.8	1.1	0.2	0.4	–	56	3.4	38.1
1–2 Feb	JNN	1,010	24.7	6.4	3.1	8.1	3.4	4.2	1.9	0.8	0.4	0.1	0.4	41.9	4.6	17.2
25–26 Jan	ANN	1,030	35.3	10.9	4.6	9.3	3.8	4.5	3.1	0.8	0.9	0.4	0.8	22.5	3	12.8
25–26 Jan	Kyodo News	1,064	29.6	10.7	5.4	14.4	4.4	4.6	3.7	1.4	1.3	0.6	0.8 (Note: The Collaborative Party: 0.3%; Others: 0.5%)	19.3	3.8	10.3
24–26 Jan	Nikkei/TV Tokyo	946	33	10	6	14	3	4	2	1	1	0	–	20	6	13
18–19 Jan	Sankei/FNN	1,005	29.4	10.1	2.5	7.2	2.8	3.5	2.2	0.8	1.1	0.3	–	37	3.1	7.6
18–19 Jan	Asahi	1,103	23	7	3	12	4	3	3	1	0	0	–	37	7	14
18–19 Jan	Mainichi/SSRC	2,042	20	11	5	15	2	4	2	1	2	0	–	38	–	18
17–19 Jan	Yomiuri/NNN	1,015	28	5	3	13	4	4	2	1	1	0	–	34	4	6
11–13 Jan	NHK	1,211	30.5	8.1	3.6	6.4	2.7	2.1	1.3	0.3	1.1	0.3	0.3 (Note: The Collaborative Party: 0.1%; Others: 0.2%)	37.8	5.4	7.3
10–13 Jan	Jiji Press	1,180	17.3	5.1	2.8	6.6	3.6	1.7	1.4	0.3	0.5	0.3	–	57.3	3.1	40
11–12 Jan	Senkyo.com/JX	996	26.8	17	4.8	5.7	4.1	3.2	6	0.7	1.8	0.7	0.1 (Note: The Collaborative Party: 0.1%)	29	–	2.2
4–5 Jan	JNN	1,018	26.2	8.2	2.5	11	3.2	3.6	2.1	1.2	0.8	0.4	–	37.4	3.4	11.2

=== 2024 ===
Fieldwork date	Polling firm	Sample size	LDP	CDP	Ishin	DPFP	Komei	Reiwa	JCP	Sansei	CPJ	SDP	Others	No party	Und./ no ans.	Lead
20–22 Dec	Nikkei/TV Tokyo	774	32	9	5	14	3	3	3	1	1	1	–	24	3	8
14–15 Dec	Senkyo.com/JX	996	26.8	17.2	4.8	5.7	2.9	1.8	3.8	1	2.5	1.3	0.2 (Note: The Collaborative Party: 0.2%)	31.9	–	5.1
14–15 Dec	Sankei/FNN	1,020	28.1	9	3.2	11.3	2.4	2.8	3.5	0.7	0.5	0.6	–	36.9	1	8.8
14–15 Dec	Asahi	1,049	24	9	4	11	3	2	2	1	1	0	1	35	7	11
14–15 Dec	Kyodo News	1,056	29.1	11.3	5	12.6	2.3	5	2.7	1.8	2.1	0.6	1.2 (Note: The Collaborative Party: 0.4%; Others: 0.8%)	22.5	3.8	6.6
14–15 Dec	Mainichi/SSRC	2,045	20	11	5	13	2	4	2	1	2	0	–	38	2	18
13–15 Dec	Yomiuri/NNN	1,018	24	8	4	12	5	3	2	0	0	0	–	36	4	12
6–9 Dec	Jiji Press	1,152	19.1	6.7	2.5	5.7	4.3	1.6	1.5	0.6	0.6	0.4	–	54.6	2.4	35.5
6–9 Dec	NHK	1,224	28.7	8.7	3.4	7.9	2.5	1.6	2.7	0.5	0.7	0.9	0.1	35.6	6.7	6.9
7–8 Dec	ANN	1,017	35.2	13.9	5.2	10.6	2.4	2.4	3.2	1.1	0.8	0.4	0.9	19.8	4.1	15.4
30 Nov – 1 Dec	JNN	1,003	28.2	8.5	4	8.8	3.3	2.9	2.2	0.5	0.8	0.6	0.6	35.6	4	7.4
1 Dec	Hirofumi Yoshimura and Seiji Maehara succeed Nobuyuki Baba as co-leaders of Ishin.															
23–24 Nov	Mainichi/SSRC	1,919	21	12	5	13	3	4	2	1	2	1	–	38	–	17
16–17 Nov	Kyodo News	1,021	30.5	15.1	4.4	9	3.9	6.9	2.5	2.5	1.6	0.3	0.6 (Note: The Collaborative Party: 0.2%; Others: 0.4%)	20.9	1.8	9.6
16–17 Nov	Senkyo.com/JX	1,003	26.9	16	4.3	5.6	4.2	2.5	5.1	1	1.7	0.9	–	31.9	–	5
15–17 Nov	NHK	1,213	30.1	11.4	3.6	7.4	3.8	1.4	2.4	1.2	0.3	0.5	0.2	31.6	6.1	1.5
15–17 Nov	Nikkei/TV Tokyo	800	30	16	5	11	4	4	5	2	1	1	–	19	2	11
11–12 Nov	Yomiuri/NNN	1,054	30	11	3	10	3	4	2	1	1	0	–	30	4	Tie
11 Nov	The Second Ishiba Cabinet is formed.															
8–11 Nov	Jiji Press	1,190	20	7.5	2.6	5.5	4.1	1.6	1.1	0.5	0.8	0.3	–	52.7	3.3	32.7
9–10 Nov	ANN	1,025	36.6	15.8	4.1	8.9	4.8	2.8	3.7	1	1.4	0.4	0.6	15.8	4.2	20.8
9 Nov	Tetsuo Saito succeeds Keiichi Ishii as President of Komeito.															
2–3 Nov	Sankei/FNN	1,012	25.8	13.7	5.3	10.1	3.7	2.8	3.5	3	1.6	0.4	–	28.3	1.8	2.5
2–3 Nov	Asahi	980	26	13	2	10	3	3	2	1	1	0	–	29	10	3
1–2 Nov	JNN	1,020	24.6	12.8	4	9.1	3.7	3.6	2.5	0.9	0.2	0.8	0.2	31.8	5.8	7.2
28–29 Oct	Yomiuri/NNN	1,068	25	14	5	7	4	4	3	2	1	1	–	31	3	6
28–29 Oct	Kyodo News	1,063	31.8	20.3	5.3	9.8	3.4	6.7	2.1	1.7	1.7	0.6	–	15	1.6	11.5
27 Oct	Election results	53.84%	26.7	21.2	9.4	11.3	10.9	7	6.2	3.4	2.1	1.7	–	–	–	5.5

== Voting intention (proportional vote) ==
=== 2026 ===
Fieldwork date	Polling firm	Sample size	LDP	CRA	Ishin	DPFP	Reiwa	JCP	Sansei	CPJ	SDP	Mirai	Others	None/Und.	No ans.	Lead
8 Feb	Election results	55.7%	36.7	18.2	8.6	9.7	2.9	4.4	7.4	2.5	1.3	6.7	1.4 (Note: Genyu: 1.42%; Others: 0.02%)	–		18.5
6–7 Feb	Kyodo News	1,054	37.4	11.2	7.1	6.2	1.7	3.8	4.9	1.2	0.4	4.5	1.7 (Note: Genyu: 1.3%; Others: 0.4%)	18.5 (Note: Undecided: 16.9%; None: 1.6%)	1.4	18.9
2–4 Feb	Senkyo.com/JX	1,051	37.9	17.8	8.6	8.3	2.2	5.3	4.8	2.1	1.4	4.6	1.6 (Note: Genyu: 1.3%; Others: 0.3%)	5.5	–	20.1
31 Jan – 1 Feb	Kyodo News	1,048	36.1	13.9	5.4	5.7	0.9	1.5	5.6	1	1.4	4.4	1.5 (Note: Genyu: 0.4%; Others: 1.1%)	22.1 (Note: Undecided: 21.3%; None: 0.8%)	0.5	14
31 Jan – 1 Feb	JNN	1,038	32	10	6	6	2	4	6	1	0	4	2 (Note: Genyu: 1%; Others: 1%)	24	3	8
24–25 Jan	Sankei/FNN	1,013	33.8	10.3	4.8	5.1	1.5	2	3.8	0.8	0.5	1.3	–	31	5.1	2.8
24–25 Jan	ANN	1,027	31.5	14.7	4.9	5.6	1.3	2.4	2.9	1	0.3	1.1	0.8	33.4 (Note: Undecided/no answer: 31.5%; None: 1.9%)		1.9
24–25 Jan	Mainichi/SSRC	2,048	24	14	4	7	2	2	4	1	1	3	–	36	–	12
24–25 Jan	Kyodo News	1,062	29.2	11.9	5.5	8.4	1.8	2	4.3	1	0.9	2.5	0.3 (Note: The Collaborative Party: 0.1%; Others: 0.2%)	30.5 (Note: Undecided: 27.8%; None: 2.7%)	1.7	1.3
23–25 Jan	Nikkei/TV Tokyo	977	40	13	7	9	2	2	7	1	0	2	–	10	5	27
23–25 Jan	Yomiuri/NNN	1,034	36	9	7	9	2	4	5	2	1	3	–	16	6	20
23 Jan	Sanae Takaichi dissolves the House of Representatives. A general election is called for 8 February 2026.															
17–18 Jan	Asahi	1,228	34	9	10	10	4	3	7	2	1	2	2	16		18
17–18 Jan	Senkyo.com/JX	1,043	37	17.9	5.3	9.1	3.5	4.9	6.7	1.9	0.7	1.5	1.9	9.6	–	19.1
15 Jan	CDP and Komeito agree to contest the general election together as a new party, the Centrist Reform Alliance.															

=== 2025 ===
Fieldwork date	Polling firm	Sample size	LDP	CDP	Ishin	DPFP	Komei	Reiwa	JCP	Sansei	CPJ	SDP	Mirai	Others	None/Und.	No ans.	Lead
13–14 Dec	Senkyo.com/JX	1,036	37.1	10.9	9	7.1	4.8	3.1	4.4	7.7	2.4	0.2	1.3	2	9.9	–	26.2
15–16 Nov	Asahi	1,215	34	9	8	8	5	3	3	7	2	1	1	–	19		15
15–16 Nov	Senkyo.com/JX	1,003	35.8	11.4	8	9.1	4.8	3.6	2.7	7.5	2.6	0.8	1.6	2	10.3	–	24.4
25–26 Oct	Asahi	1,342	32	9	10	9	4	5	3	7	3	1	3	–	14		18
11–12 Oct	Senkyo.com/JX	1,013	26.9	12.5	6.4	9.5	5.6	3.1	4.5	8.5	2.6	0.9	2.1	1.4	16.1	–	10.8
20–21 Sep	Asahi	1,176	26	11	5	11	4	5	3	10	3	1	2	–	19		7
13–14 Sep	Senkyo.com/JX	995	27.8	15.4	6.6	6	4.4	3.9	5.6	9.5	3.1	1.4	1.3	1.8	13	0.2	12.4
16–17 Aug	Senkyo.com/JX	1,000	28.2	15.8	6.3	8.3	6.5	3.8	7.4	7.1	2.7	1.2	1	2.1	9.6	–	12.4
20 Jul	HoC election	58.51%	21.6	12.5	7.4	12.9	8.8	6.6	4.8	12.5	5	2.1	2.6	3.2	–		8.7

Fieldwork date	Polling firm	Sample size	LDP	CDP	Ishin	DPFP	Komei	Reiwa	JCP	Sansei	CPJ	SDP	Others	None/Und.	No ans.	Lead
12–13 Jul	Senkyo.com/JX	991	28.6	19.5	6.3	5.5	5.8	3.6	5.2	8.4	3.1	2.6	2.5	8.9	–	9.1
5–6 Jul	ANN	1,048	23.6	11	4.2	5.4	5.6	2.4	4.1	6.2	1.4	0.4	1.7 (Note: NHK Party: 0.3%; Others: 1.4%)	19	14.9	4.6
5–6 Jul	Kyodo News	1,253	18.2	6.6	3.4	6.8	5	3.7	2.5	8.1	2.5	0.9	0.7	40.8 (Note: Undecided: 37%; None: 3.8%)	0.8	22.6
5–6 Jul	JNN	1,010	25	12	6	8	5	6	3	9	2	1	5	19		6
28–29 Jun	Kyodo News	1,254	17.9	9.8	2.5	6.4	3.6	3.4	2.7	5.8	1.1	0.8	0.6 (Note: The Collaborative Party: 0.1%; Others: 0.5%)	44.4 (Note: Undecided: 40.3%; None: 4.1%)	1	24.5
28–29 Jun	Mainichi/SSRC	2,050	18	11	4	10	3	4	3	7	2	1	1	36	–	18
27–29 Jun	Nikkei/TV Tokyo	775	29	12	6	12	5	5	3	7	2	1	–	12	8	17
27–29 Jun	Yomiuri/NNN	1,061	24	11	5	9	5	4	5	6	1	0	1	23	8	1
26–27 Jun	Agricultural News		35	13.5	1	5.8	1.7	3.3	3.9	1.4	1	1.3	0.7	30.7	0.7	4.3
21–22 Jun	ANN	1,031	22	10.7	3.4	7.5	4.2	5.1	4.2	3.3	0.9	0.6	0.8 (Note: NHK Party: 0.1%; Others: 0.7%)	37.3 (Note: Undecided/no answer: 35.8%; None: 1.5%)		15.3
21–22 Jun	Kyodo News	1,050	26.7	11.1	4.8	10.6	5.1	6.8	3.1	4.3	1.8	1.6	0.4 (Note: The Collaborative Party: 0.2%; Others: 0.2%)	23.7		3
13–16 Jun	Jiji Press	1,162	24.5	8.3	4.4	6	4	3.1	2.2	3.5	0.7	0.5	–	42.8		18.3
14–15 Jun	Sankei/FNN	1,027	24.5	9.6	3.8	8.8	4.1	4.1	3	3.6	1.2	0.2	0.7	36.4 (Note: Undecided/no answer: 31.4%; None: 5%)		11.9
14–15 Jun	Asahi	1,256	26	12	7	10	5	7	4	4	1	1	2	21		5
14–15 Jun	Senkyo.com/JX	990	30.4	18.8	5.6	7.4	4.7	3.8	5.9	3.1	3.2	1.1	1.8 (Note: The Collaborative Party: 0.1%; Others: 1.7%)	14.1	–	11.6
14–15 Jun	Kyodo News	1,049	25.9	9.2	5.1	11.5	3.7	4.3	3.2	4.3	2	1.1	1.3 (Note: The Collaborative Party: 1.1%; Others: 0.2%)	28.4		2.5
7–8 Jun	ANN	1,025	26.2	9.8	4.6	6.9	5.1	2.9	3.4	2.3	0.7	0.5	1	36.4 (Note: Undecided/no answer: 32.1%; None: 4.3%)		10.2
24–25 May	Kyodo News	1,064	28.6	13.6	6.3	14.3	4.4	5.2	2.3	2.6	1.6	1	0.7 (Note: The Collaborative Party: 0.3%; Others: 0.4%)	19.4		9.2
23–25 May	Nikkei/TV Tokyo	892	26	12	7	12	5	7	2	3	2	0	–	14	8	12
16–19 May	Jiji Press	1,176	19.7	9.4	4.1	11.2	4.4	3.7	1.7	2	0.9	0.7	–	42.2		22.5
17–18 May	Sankei/FNN	1,025	23.5	8.3	3.8	11.4	4.4	4.1	3.2	1.7	0.9	0.6	0.7	37.4 (Note: Undecided/no answer: 29.1%; None: 8.3%)		13.9
17–18 May	Asahi	1,209	26	13	6	13	5	7	4	3	2	1	3	17		9
17–18 May	Senkyo.com/JX	986	25.8	19.2	6	10.9	5.5	3	6	2.1	2.6	1.3	2.1 (Note: The Collaborative Party: 0.3%; Others: 1.8%)	15.4	–	6.6
17–18 May	Kyodo News	1,064	20.2	14.2	6	12.4	5.7	5.9	3.8	2.4	1.2	1.3	0.7 (Note: The Collaborative Party: 0.4%; Others: 0.3%)	26.2		6
17–18 May	Mainichi/SSRC	2,045	15	10	4	14	3	5	3	3	2	1	1	41	–	25
16–18 May	Yomiuri/NNN	1,072	26	10	6	14	4	7	2	2	1	1	–	22	5	4
10–11 May	ANN	1,016	25.8	8.9	2.9	10.6	4	3.9	2.7	0.8	1	0.8	1	37.6 (Note: Undecided/no answer: 33.9%; None: 3.7%)		11.8
3–4 May	JNN	1,026	26	11	9	15	6	7	3	2	1	1	4	16		10
19–21 Apr	Nikkei/TV Tokyo	799	29	14	6	15	4	6	3	1	2	1	–	12	7	14
19–20 Apr	Sankei/FNN	1,015	23.7	8.8	3.8	13.3	2.9	2.9	2.8	1.7	1	0.6	0.9	37.8 (Note: Undecided/no answer: 31.6%; None: 6.2%)		14.1
19–20 Apr	Asahi	1,240	23	12	7	17	4	7	5	2	1	1	2	19		4
19–20 Apr	ANN	1,030	27.2	10.6	3.6	11.8	3.5	3	3.4	0.5	0.9	1.6	1.1	32.9 (Note: Undecided/no answer: 29.5%; None: 3.4%)		5.7
11–14 Apr	Jiji Press	1,140	20.6	7.8	4.9	10.6	4.3	5.6	1.8	1.6	0.9	0.6	–	41.3		20.7
12–13 Apr	Senkyo.com/JX	995	25.3	16.6	7.9	11.6	5	4.5	6.6	1.6	1.4	1.1	3.5 (Note: The Collaborative Party: 0.5%; Others: 3%)	14.8	–	8.7
12–13 Apr	Kyodo News	1,051	24.6	12.3	3.9	18.5	3.9	4.1	3.2	1	1.7	0.8	–	26		1.4
12–13 Apr	Mainichi/SSRC	2,040	16	11	4	16	3	5	3	1	1	1	–	38	–	22
11–13 Apr	Yomiuri/NNN	1,026	27	10	5	15	4	6	4	1	2	0	–	19	7	8
22–23 Mar	Sankei/FNN	1,013	19.3	8.5	3.2	12	2.6	5.3	2.6	1	0.9	0.4	–	44.2 (Note: Undecided/no answer: 36.6%; None: 7.6%)		24.9
22–23 Mar	ANN	1,025	24.1	11.1	4.6	11.2	3.2	3.6	3.9	0.5	1.3	0.3	0.5	35.7 (Note: Undecided/no answer: 33.1%; None: 2.6%)		11.6
22–23 Mar	Kyodo News	1,046	24.3	12.5	6.4	13.4	4.1	7.3	3.6	1.2	0.3	1.1	0.4 (Note: The Collaborative Party: 0.1%; Others: 0.3%)	25.4		1.1
21–23 Mar	Nikkei/TV Tokyo	847	29	13	9	14	3	8	3	1	1	0	1	11	8	18
15–16 Mar	Senkyo.com/JX	998	23.7	20.6	6.2	13.9	4.4	3.4	6.8	1.2	1.7	1.3	2.4 (Note: The Collaborative Party: 0.2%; Others: 2.2%)	14.2	–	3.1
15–16 Mar	Asahi	1,137	24	12	7	17	5	7	3	1	2	1	3	19		5
15–16 Mar	Mainichi/SSRC	2,047	16	13	5	17	2	5	2	1	1	0	1	38	–	21
14–16 Mar	Yomiuri/NNN	1,023	25	11	6	17	4	5	3	1	1	0	–	20	6	5
22–23 Feb	ANN	1,034	23.6	10.7	6.2	9.6	5.2	3.7	3.6	1	0.4	0.8	0.8	34.4 (Note: Undecided/no answer: 31%; None: 3.4%)		10.8
21–23 Feb	Nikkei/TV Tokyo	847	29	13	7	14	4	8	3	1	1	0	1 (Note: The Collaborative Party: 1%)	10	9	15
15–16 Feb	Senkyo.com/JX	1,004	25.7	20.8	8.3	9.8	4.2	4.6	5.6	0.6	2.2	1.5	2.3 (Note: The Collaborative Party: 0.4%; Others: 1.9%)	14.5	–	4.9
15–16 Feb	Asahi	1,111	26	11	5	16	5	9	4	2	2	1	1	18		8
15–16 Feb	Kyodo News	1,063	24.9	11.3	6.8	11.5	3.5	5.9	2.5	1.8	1.9	0.5	0.7 (Note: The Collaborative Party: 0.5%; Others: 0.2%)	28.7		3.8
15–16 Feb	Mainichi/SSRC	2,043	16	11	5	15	3	5	2	0	2	0	–	38	3	22
6–9 Feb	Jiji Press	1,126	22	9.7	3.6	10.2	5.1	3.5	2.5	1.3	0.4	0.4	–	40.2		18.2
25–26 Jan	Kyodo News	1,064	26	12.9	5.8	14.9	3.8	4.4	4.1	1	1.4	0.3	0.4 (Note: The Collaborative Party: 0.1%; Others: 0.3%)	25		1
24–26 Jan	Nikkei/TV Tokyo	946	32	13	8	15	3	5	3	2	2	1	–	11	8	17
18–19 Jan	Asahi	1,103	25	15	8	15	6	6	3	1	1	2	2	16		9
18–19 Jan	Mainichi/SSRC	2,042	17	14	6	16	2	4	2	1	2	0	1	35	–	18
11–12 Jan	Senkyo.com/JX	996	27	21.2	8	8.8	4.5	4.2	7	1.3	2.2	0.8	2 (Note: The Collaborative Party: 0.2%; Others: 1.8%)	12.9	–	5.8

=== 2024 ===
Fieldwork date	Polling firm	Sample size	LDP	CDP	Ishin	DPFP	Komei	Reiwa	JCP	Sansei	CPJ	SDP	Others	None/Und.	No ans.	Lead
14–15 Dec	Senkyo.com/JX	996	23.8	22.7	9.1	10.3	4.5	2.7	5.3	1.5	2	1.5	1.3 (Note: The Collaborative Party: 0.3%; Others: 1%)	15.2	–	1.1
16–17 Nov	Senkyo.com/JX	1,003	26.3	21	7.8	10.8	5.3	2.7	6.4	1.9	2.6	0.7	2.1 (Note: The Collaborative Party: 0.7%; Others: 1.4%)	12.5	–	5.3
27 Oct	Election results	53.84%	26.7	21.2	9.4	11.3	10.9	7	6.2	3.4	2.1	1.7	0 (Note: The Collaborative Party: 0.04%; Shiji Nashi: 0.03%)	–		5.5

== Voting intention (district vote) ==
=== 2026 ===
Fieldwork date	Polling firm	Sample size	Government	Opposition	None/Und.	No ans.	Lead
8 Feb	Election results	55.7%	55.9	44.1	–		11.8
31 Jan – 1 Feb	Kyodo News	1,048	44.0	26.5	27.2	2.3	16.8
24–25 Jan	Kyodo News	1,062	40.0	22.8	34.9	2.3	17.2

=== 2025 ===
Fieldwork date	Polling firm	Sample size	Government	Opposition	Others	None/Und.	No ans.	Lead
5–6 Jul	Kyodo News	1,253	20.5	36.6	–	41.8	1.1	5.2
28–29 Jun	Kyodo News	1,254	19.9	32.6	–	46.3	1.2	13.7

== Preferred coalition ==
=== 2026 ===
Fieldwork date	Polling firm	Sample size	LDP–Ishin–led coalition	LDP–Ishin with other parties	Opposition–led coalition	Others	Und./ no ans.
24–25 Jan	ANN	1,027	54	–	28	–	18
23–25 Jan	Nikkei/TV Tokyo	977	67	–	19 (Note: CRA–led coalition: 19%)	8 (Note: None: 8%)	7
23–25 Jan	Yomiuri/NNN	1,034	59 (Note: LDP–led coalition: 59%)	–	22	–	19

=== 2025 ===
Fieldwork date	Polling firm	Sample size	LDP–Ishin–led coalition	LDP–Ishin with other parties	Opposition–led coalition	Others	Und./ no ans.
6–7 Dec	JNN	1,021	27	35	13	15 (Note: "A government with a different framework": 15%)	10
21–22 Oct	Yomiuri/NNN	1,057	58 (Note: LDP–led coalition: 58%)	–	26	–	16
20 Oct	The LDP and Ishin agree to sign a confidence and supply agreement.						

Fieldwork date	Polling firm	Sample size	LDP–Komei–led coalition	LDP–Komei with other parties	Opposition–led coalition (Note: Some polls refer it as "CDP–led coalition".)	Others	Und./ no ans.
10 Oct	Komeito leaves the governing minority coalition.						
4–6 Oct	Kyodo News	1,061	12.6	40	10.5	32.4 (Note: "A new government framework resulting from a political restructuring": 31.9%; Others: 0.5%)	4.5
4 Oct	Sanae Takaichi is elected President of the LDP.						
20–21 Sep	Sankei/FNN	1,018	15.6	46.9 (Note: LDP–Komei with other parties: 46.9% (LDP–Komei–CDP coalition: 20.3%; LDP–Komei–Ishin coalition: 25.6% LDP–Komei–DPFP coalition: 25.8%; LDP–Komei–Sansei coalition: 9.7%; LDP–Komei–Other: 13.6%; No answer: 5%))	28.7	–	8.8
20–21 Sep	Mainichi/SSRC	1,972	46	26	10	–	17
12–15 Sep	Jiji Press	1,162	16.5	39 (Note: LDP–Komei–CDP coalition: 10.9%; LDP–Komei–Ishin coalition: 9.4% LDP–Komei–DPFP coalition: 11.6%; LDP–Komei–Sansei coalition: 7.1%)	15.3	–	29.2
11–12 Sep	Kyodo News	1,040	11.6	33.9	12.4	36.6 (Note: "A new government framework resulting from a political restructuring": 36.5%; Other: 0.1%)	5.5
5–7 Sep	NHK	1,186	43.7	24	16.7	0.7	14.9
29–31 Aug	Nikkei/TV Tokyo	955	34 (Note: "Opposition parties cooperating with the LDP–Komeito government on each policy basis": 34%)	28 (Note: LDP–Komei–CDP coalition: 9%; LDP–Komei–Ishin coalition: 7% LDP–Komei–DPFP coalition: 12%)	23	–	15
23–24 Aug	Sankei/FNN	1,022	14.3	48.3 (Note: LDP–Komei with other parties: 48.3% (LDP–Komei–CDP coalition: 19.8%; LDP–Komei–Ishin coalition: 22.7% LDP–Komei–DPFP coalition: 25.7%; LDP–Komei–Sansei coalition: 11.1%; LDP–Komei–Other: 13.3%; No answer: 7.4%))	33.1	–	4.3
23–24 Aug	Mainichi/SSRC	2,046	43	16	12	–	28
9–11 Aug	NHK	1,137	43.7 (Note: LDP–Komei coalition with opposition parties cooperating on each policy: 43.7%)	25.5	18.1	0.6	12
8–11 Aug	Jiji Press	1,138	16.4	35.8 (Note: LDP–Komei–CDP coalition: 10.6%; LDP–Komei–Ishin coalition: 5.5% LDP–Komei–DPFP coalition: 11.7%; LDP–Komei–Sansei coalition: 8%)	20.9	–	26.9
2–3 Aug	JNN	1,003	39	–	49	–	12
26–27 Jul	Sankei/FNN	1,030	13.9	46.3 (Note: LDP–Komei with other parties: 46.3% (LDP–Komei–CDP coalition: 21.3%; LDP–Komei–Ishin coalition: 21.7% LDP–Komei–DPFP coalition: 27.5%; LDP–Komei–Sansei coalition: 11.7%; LDP–Komei–Other: 9.8%; No answer: 8%))	34.1	–	5.7
26–27 Jul	Asahi	1,250		56	21	–	
26–27 Jul	ANN	1,020	44	–	38	–	18
26–27 Jul	Mainichi/SSRC	2,045	13	26 (Note: LDP–Komei–CDP coalition: 6%; LDP–Komei–Ishin coalition: 4%; LDP–Komei–DPFP coalition: 8%; LDP–Komei–Other coalition: 8%)	19	6	36
25–27 Jul	Nikkei/TV Tokyo	937	31 (Note: "Opposition parties cooperating with the LDP–Komeito government on each policy basis": 31%)	29 (Note: LDP–Komei–CDP coalition: 8%; LDP–Komei–Ishin coalition: 8% LDP–Komei–DPFP coalition: 13%)	24	–	16
21–22 Jul	Kyodo News	1,049	13.1	28	17.5	36.3 (Note: "A new government framework resulting from a political restructuring": 36.2%; Others: 0.1%)	5.1
21–22 Jul	Yomiuri/NNN	1,043	35	–	47	–	18
5–6 Jul	Kyodo News	1,253	15	31.2	17.6	29.8 (Note: "A new government framework resulting from a political restructuring": 29.8%)	6.4
5–6 Jul	JNN (Note: Question: What is your desired outcome in the House of Councillors election?)	1,010	36	–	55	–	9
28–29 Jun	Kyodo News	1,254	17.1	30.7	16	30.1 (Note: "A new government framework resulting from a political restructuring": 30.1%)	6.1
28–29 Jun	Mainichi/SSRC	2,050	13	26	24	–	36
27–29 Jun	Nikkei/TV Tokyo	775	32 (Note: "Opposition parties cooperating with the LDP–Komeito government on each policy basis": 32%)	25 (Note: LDP–Komei–CDP coalition: 7%; LDP–Komei–Ishin coalition: 7% LDP–Komei–DPFP coalition: 11%)	25	2	17
13–16 Jun	Jiji Press	1,162	37.3	–	34.3	–	28.4
14–15 Jun	Sankei/FNN	1,027	17.4	41.9 (Note: LDP–Komei with other parties: 41.9% (LDP–Komei–CDP coalition: 26.4%; LDP–Komei–Ishin coalition: 22.3% LDP–Komei–DPFP coalition: 23.5%; LDP–Komei–Other: 21.3%))	32.6	–	8.1
14–15 Jun	Asahi	1,256	33	–	51	–	16
7–8 Jun	ANN	1,025	44	–	40	–	16
31 May – 1 Jun	JNN	1,056	43	–	41	–	16
23–25 May	Nikkei/TV Tokyo	892	33 (Note: "Opposition parties cooperating with the LDP–Komeito government on each policy basis": 33%)	26 (Note: LDP–Komei–CDP coalition: 7%; LDP–Komei–Ishin coalition: 7% LDP–Komei–DPFP coalition: 12%)	22	2	17
16–19 May	Jiji Press	1,176	20	28.2 (Note: LDP–Komei coalition: 20%; LDP–Komei–CDP coalition: 8.9%; LDP–Komei–Ishin coalition: 7.6%; LDP–Komei–DPFP coalition: 11.7%)	21.4	–	30.4
17–18 May	Sankei/FNN (Note: Question: As a result of the House of Councillors election held this summer, how do you want the overall number of seats in the House of Councillors to change?)	1,025	38	–	53.7	–	8.3
17–18 May	Asahi	1,209	17	49	22	–	12
16–18 May	Yomiuri/NNN	1,072	36	–	48	–	15
10–11 May	ANN	1,016	43	–	41	–	16
3–4 May	JNN	1,026	39	–	49	–	12
19–20 Apr	Sankei/FNN	1,015	13.9	48.3	30.2	–	7.6
19–20 Apr	ANN	1,030	43	–	40	–	17
12–13 Apr	Mainichi/SSRC	2,040	9	25 (Note: LDP–Komei–CDP coalition: 7%; LDP–Komei–Ishin coalition: 7%; LDP–Komei–DPFP coalition: 11%)	22	10	34
11–13 Apr	Yomiuri/NNN	1,026	40	–	42	–	18
5–6 Apr	JNN	1,031	20	38	29	–	13
14–16 Mar	Yomiuri/NNN	1,023	36	–	46	–	18
18–19 Jan	Asahi	1,103	34	–	51	–	15
17–19 Jan	Yomiuri/NNN	1,015	41	–	40	–	19

=== 2024 ===
Fieldwork date	Polling firm	Sample size	LDP–Komei–led coalition	LDP–Komei with other parties	CDP–led coalition (Note: Some polls refer it as "Opposition–led coalition".)	Others	Und./ no ans.
13–15 Dec	Yomiuri/NNN	1,018	41	–	41	–	18
15–17 Nov	Nikkei/TV Tokyo	800	72 (Note: "Opposition parties cooperating with the LDP–Komeito government on each policy basis": 42%)	30	13	1	14
11–12 Nov	Yomiuri/NNN	1,054	44	–	37	–	19
8–11 Nov	Jiji Press	1,190	40.7	–	32.7	–	26.6
9–10 Nov	ANN	1,025	50	–	34	–	17
2–3 Nov	Sankei/FNN	1,012	30.5	30.2	31.1	–	8.2
2–3 Nov	Asahi	980	43	–	32	–	25
1–2 Nov	JNN	1,020	44	–	41	–	15
28–29 Oct	Yomiuri/NNN	1,068	43	–	40	–	17
28–29 Oct	Kyodo News	1,063	18.1	19.3	24.6	31.6 (Note: "A new framework through political realignment": 31.5%; Others: 0.1%)	6.4

== Seat projections ==
Color key: Exit poll

Seat projections from analysts (district seats + proportional representation)
Fieldwork date	Publication/ Newspapers	Sample size	Analysts	LDP	CRA	Ishin	DPFP	Reiwa	JCP	Genyu	Sansei	CPJ	SDP	Mirai	Ind./ Oth.	Gov.	Opp.	Gov. Majority
8 Feb 2026	Election results	–	–	316 (249+67)	49 (7+42)	36 (20+16)	28 (8+20)	1 (0+1)	4 (0+4)	1 (1+0)	15 (0+15)	0	0	11 (0+11)	4 (4+0)	352	113	+119
8 Feb 2026	FNN exit poll	–	–	292–329	36–66	30–38	22–33	0–3	2–7	1–2	10–16	0–2	0–1	8–13	6	324–365	79–143	+91–132
8 Feb 2026	ANN exit poll	–	–	313	44	35	30	3	5	2	15	0	0	12	6	348	117	+115
8 Feb 2026	TV Tokyo exit poll	–	–	314	50	35	30	0	3	2	14	0	0	9	8	349	116	+116
8 Feb 2026	NNN exit poll	–	–	305	54	36	32	1	5	2	13	0	0	9	8	341	124	+108
8 Feb 2026	NHK exit poll	–	–	274–328	37–91	28–38	18–35	0–2	3–8	0–3	5–14	0–1	0	7–13	3–8	302–366	73–175	+69–133
8 Feb 2026	JNN exit poll	–	–	321	50	35	29	0	3	2	11	0	0	8	6	356	109	+123
3–5 Feb 2026	Mainichi/JNN	?	–	238–330	55–130	25–38	16–28	0–2	2–9	1–3	5–14	0–5	0	2–8	3–8	263–368	84–207	+30–135
3–5 Feb 2026	Nikkei	?	–	≥233														
3–5 Feb 2026	Yomiuri	356,593	–	>261	<100	~34	<27	<9	<8	1	~10	1	0	~10	~6	>295	<170	+62
31 Jan – 1 Feb 2026	Asahi	?	–	292 (220+72)	74 (32+42)	32 (19+13)	29 (9+20)	4 (0+4)	7 (1+6)	1 (1+0)	11 (0+11)	0 (0+0)	0 (0+0)	8 (0+8)	7 (7+0)	324	141	+91
28–29 Jan 2026	Mainichi/JNN	248,714	–	208–296	84–161	29–37	21–33	0	2–7	1–2	7–15	0	0	3–8	5–9	237–333	123–235	+4–100
28 Jan 2026	Shūkan Bunshun	–	Masashi Kubota	205 (Note: LDP-Independents: 2 (2+0)) (135+70)	167 (120+47)	29 (14+15)	27 (11+16)	6 (0+6)	6 (1+5)	2 (2+0)	15 (0+15)	1 (0+1)	0	1 (0+1)	6 (6+0)	234	231	+1
27–28 Jan 2026	Nikkei	?	–	≥233														
27–28 Jan 2026	Yomiuri	296,268	–	>261	~100	~34	~27	<9	<8	1–2	~10	1	0	~10	~6	>295	<170	+62
20 Jan 2026	Asahi TV News	–	Kijimae Yamamoto	232	124	33	35	7	5	0	19	3	0	1	6	265	200	+32
15 Dec 2025	Weekly Gendai	–	–	211 (Note: LDP-Independents: 1 (1+0)) (146+65)	163 (Note: CDP: 143 (103+40); Komeito: 20 (1+19)) (104+59)	33 (21+12)	30 (10+20)	7 (0+7)	7 (0+7)	1 (1+0)	6 (0+6)	0 (0+0)	0 (0+0)	–	7 (7+0)	244	221	+11
12 Nov 2025	Shūkan Bunshun	–	Masashi Kubota	241 (168+73)	122 (Note: CDP: 105 (82+23); Komeito: 17 (1+16)) (83+39)	32 (17+15)	26 (9+17)	6 (0+6)	6 (1+5)	–	19 (0+19)	1 (0+1)	0 (0+0)	1 (0+1)	11 (11+0)	273	192	+40
27 Oct 2024	2024 election results	–	–	191 (132+59)	172 (Note: CDP: 148 (104+44); Komeito: 24 (4+20)) (108+64)	38 (23+15)	28 (11+17)	9 (0+9)	8 (1+7)	–	3 (0+3)	3 (1+2)	1 (1+0)	–	12 (12+0)	237 (Note: LDP: 191; Ishin: 38; Independents: 8)	228	+4

== Preferred prime minister ==
=== After LDP presidential election ===
==== 2025 ====
Fieldwork date	Polling firm	Sample size	Takaichi LDP	Noda CDP	Fujita Ishin	Tamaki DPFP	Others	NOT/ UD/NA
11–12 Oct	Senkyo.com/JX	1,013	48.5	–	–	20.4	–	31.1
4–5 Oct	JNN	1,036	65	11	1	7	–	16

=== LDP presidential election ===

(Figures in parentheses are approval ratings of Liberal Democratic Party supporters)

Fieldwork date	Polling firm	Sample size	Sanae Takaichi	Shinjirō Koizumi	Yoshimasa Hayashi	Takayuki Kobayashi	Toshimitsu Motegi	Others	NOT/ UD/NA
4 Oct	Election results	(626,555)	(40.05)	(28.59)	(20.89)	(5.15)	(5.32)	–	–
29–30 Sep	NTV/JX	(1,210)	(35)	(28)	(23)	(5)	(4)	–	(5)
27–28 Sep	ANN	1,025 (340)	31 (24)	33 (41)	14 (16)	3 (3)	5 (4)	–	14 (12)
27–28 Sep	Yomiuri	3,143 (Note: LDP supporters) (519) (Note: LDP members)	25 (28)	40 (41)	16 (13)	5 (8)	4 (4)	–	10 (6)
27–28 Sep	Kyodo News	(1,044)	(34.4)	(29.3)	(19.5)	(3.8)	(5.2)	–	(7.8)
26–28 Sep	Nikkei/TV Tokyo	915 (284)	34 (28)	25 (33)	14 (20)	4 (3)	5 (6)	–	18 (9)
23–24 Sep	NTV/JX	(1,108)	(34)	(28)	(17)	(5)	(4)	–	(12)
20–21 Sep	Sankei/FNN	1,018 (284)	28.3 (22.5)	25.7 (35.2)	11.1 (18.6)	4 (4)	3.8 (5.3)	–	27 (14.4)
20–21 Sep	Asahi	1,176 (306)	28 (24)	24 (41)	9 (10)	5 (3)	4 (8)	–	30 (Note: None of these: 25%; Don't know: 5%) (14) (Note: None of these: 11%; Don't know: 3%)
20–21 Sep	Mainichi/SSRC	1,972 (375)	25 (22)	21 (40)	10 (11)	2 (5)	3 (5)	4	34 (17)
19–20 Sep	NTV/JX	(1,010)	(28)	(32)	(15)	(7)	(5)	–	(14)
13–14 Sep	Senkyo.com/JX	995	23.4	26.7	14.1	3.8	6.5	–	25.4

=== Before the LDP presidential election ===

==== 2025 ====
(Figures in parentheses are approval ratings of Liberal Democratic Party supporters)

Fieldwork date	Polling firm	Sample size	LDP									CDP	Ishin	DPFP	Others	NOT/ UD/NA
Fieldwork date	Polling firm	Sample size	Shigeru Ishiba	Sanae Takaichi	Shinjirō Koizumi	Yoshimasa Hayashi	Takayuki Kobayashi	Toshimitsu Motegi	Yōko Kamikawa	Taro Kono	Katsunobu Katō	Yoshihiko Noda	Seiji Maehara	Yuichiro Tamaki	Others	NOT/ UD/NA
12–15 Sep	Jiji Press	1,162 (199)	–	21 (19.7)	23.8 (31.8)	5.9 (7.6)	3.1 (3.5)	5.9 (11.1)	1.4	2.8	0.9	–	–	–	–	35.2 (26.3)
13–14 Sep	Yomiuri/NNN	1,043 (282)	–	29 (28)	25 (33)	6 (8)	3 (5)	7 (6)	2	7 (9)	1	–	–	–	0	22 (Note: None of these: 14%; Don't know: 8%) (11)
11–12 Sep	Kyodo News	1,040 (245)	–	28 (15.7)	22.5 (36)	11.4 (14.9)	3.6 (2.8)	6.1 (8.6)	3.8 (2.7)	6.1 (7.3)	0.4 (0.7)	–	–	–	0.3	17.8 (11.3)
7 Sep	Shigeru Ishiba announces he will resign as President of the LDP. The 2025 LDP presidential election is scheduled for 4 October 2025.															
6–7 Sep	Kyodo News	1,045	9.9	26.7	19.4	4	3.4	4.3	4.4	8.3	1.3	–	–	–	0.2	18.1
6–7 Sep	JNN	1,030	8.6	19.3	19.3	2.2	0.9	0.9	1.8	4.9	0.6	3.2	–	5.8	20.4 (Note: Fumitake Fujita (Ishin): 0.1%; Others: 20.3%)	12.1
29–31 Aug	Nikkei/TV Tokyo	955	8	23	22	4	3	1	–	4	–	4	–	7	4 (Note: Fumio Kishida (LDP): 2%; Others: 2%)	20
23–24 Aug	Sankei/FNN	1,022 (227)	14.4 (29)	23 (17)	20.9 (24.9)	2.7	1.8	1.2	1.6	5.1	0.3	–	–	–	2.3 (Note: Fumio Kishida (LDP): 2.3%)	26.7 (29.1)
23–24 Aug	ANN	1,012	5	22	27	5	2	1	2	6	1	–	–	–	16	13
23–24 Aug	Mainichi/SSRC	2,046	21	14	9	2	2	–	–	–	–	4	–	6	9 (Note: Fumio Kishida (LDP): 2%; Others: 7%)	33
23–24 Aug	Kyodo News	1,056	13.1	24.5	20.1	4.9	4.2	3.3	2.8	9.4	1.4	–	–	–	0.2	16.1
22–24 Aug	Yomiuri/NNN	991	14	24	21	2	4	1	1	6	1	–	–	–	1 (Note: Fumio Kishida (LDP): 1%)	23 (Note: None of these: 14%; Don't know: 9%)
16–17 Aug	Senkyo.com/JX	1,000	28.9	17.3	15.9	5.9	2.5	0.7	–	2.3	0.1	–	–	–	7.1	19.3
8–11 Aug	Jiji Press	1,138 (179)	11.3 (24.6)	15.9 (19.6)	14.6 (21.2)	2.1	–	–	–	3.3	–	2.8	–	5.7	–	44.3 (34.6)
8 Aug	Fumitake Fujita succeeds Seiji Maehara as co-leader of Ishin.															
2–3 Aug	JNN	1,003	11.1	16.7	20.4	3.4	1.7	1.1	2.3	5.2	0.8	3.8	0.5	4.4	18.1	10.5
26–27 Jul	Sankei/FNN	1,030	9.4	22.4	16	4.1	1.5	1	1.8	4.1	0.6	4.2	1.2	6.8	–	26.9 (Note: None of these: 21.2%; Don't know: 5.7%)
26–27 Jul	ANN	1,020	13	20	23	5	4	2	1	6	0	–	–	–	10	16
26–27 Jul	Mainichi/SSRC	2,045	20	15	8	2	2	–	–	–	–	5	–	8	8 (Note: Fumio Kishida (LDP): 3%; Others: 5%)	32 (Note: Don't know: 31%; No answer: 1%)
25–27 Jul	Nikkei/TV Tokyo	937	6	20	20	5	2	2	–	4	–	5	1	9	5 (Note: Fumio Kishida (LDP): 3%; Shun'ichi Suzuki (LDP): 1%; Ken Saitō (LDP): 1%)	21
21–22 Jul	Yomiuri/NNN	1,043	8	26	22	2	3	2	2	7	1	–	–	–	2 (Note: Fumio Kishida (LDP): 2%)	25 (Note: None of these: 14%; Don't know: 11%)
14–15 Jun	Sankei/FNN	1,027	7.9	16.4	20.7	2.4	1.3	1.2	1	4.2	0.4	6.8	0.2	4.1	–	33.4 (Note: None of these: 25%; Don't know: 8.4%)
14–15 Jun	Senkyo.com/JX	990	15.4	15.6	19.9	6	–	–	–	2.5	–	6.5	1	2.5	13.1	17.6
24–25 May	Kyodo News	1,064	7.3	21.5	15.9	2.6	3	1.1	4.6	5.1	1.4	5.4	0.5	9.3	0.6	21.7
17–18 May	Sankei/FNN	1,025	7.7	18.9	15.2	1.5	1.9	1.9	2	4.6	0.4	5.5	0.6	5.9	–	33.8 (Note: None of these: 27.6%; Don't know: 6.2%)
17–18 May	Asahi	1,209	21	–	–	–	–	–	–	–	–	11	3	12	–	53 (Note: None of these: 49%; Don't know: 4%)

==== 2024 ====
Fieldwork date	Polling firm	Sample size	Ishiba LDP	Noda CDP	Baba Ishin	Tamaki DPFP	Saito Komei	Yamamoto Reiwa	Tamura JCP	Others	NOT/ UD/NA
9–10 Nov	ANN	1,025	37	15	1	9	1	5	1	20	13
2–3 Nov	Sankei/FNN	1,012	46.1	17.4	2.7	10.2	–	–	–	–	23.6
1–2 Nov	JNN	1,020	50	35	–	–	–	–	–	–	15

== Cabinet approval/disapproval ratings ==
=== Sanae Takaichi ===
Approval Polling for the Takaichi Cabinet.

==== 2026 ====
Fieldwork date	Polling firm	Sample size	Approve	Disapprove	Und. / no answer	Lead
2–8 Feb	Morning Consult	N/A	56	33	11	23
6–7 Feb	Kyodo News	1,054	63.3	23	13.7	40.3
2–4 Feb	Senkyo.com/JX	1,051	60.3 (Note: Strongly approve: 33.8%; Approve on balance: 26.5%)	26.6 (Note: Disapprove on balance: 8.9%; Strongly disapprove: 17.7%)	13.1	33.7
31 Jan – 1 Feb	Kyodo News	1,048	63.6	25.6	10.8	38
31 Jan – 1 Feb	JNN	1,038	69.9	26.5	3.6	43.4
30 Jan – 1 Feb	NHK	2,521	58.4	26.3	15.2	32.1
24–25 Jan	Sankei/FNN	1,013	70.8	23.4	5.8	47.4
24–25 Jan	ANN	1,027	57.6	25.3	17.1	32.3
24–25 Jan	Mainichi/SSRC	2,048	57	29	14	28
24–25 Jan	Kyodo News	1,062	63.1	25	11.9	38.1
23–25 Jan	NHK	1,564	58.8	26.3	14.9	32.5
23–25 Jan	Nikkei/TV Tokyo	977	67	26	7	41
23–25 Jan	Yomiuri/NNN	1,034	69	23	8	46
23 Jan	Sanae Takaichi dissolves the House of Representatives. A general election is called for 8 February 2026.					
17–18 Jan	Asahi	1,228	67	23	10	44
17–18 Jan	Senkyo.com/JX	1,043	63.4 (Note: Strongly approve: 38.5%; Approve on balance: 24.9%)	21.7 (Note: Disapprove on balance: 8.2%; Strongly disapprove: 13.5%)	14.9	41.7
10–12 Jan	NHK	1,213	61.9	21	17.1	40.9
9–12 Jan	Jiji Press	1,170	61	15.1	23.9	45.9
10–11 Jan	JNN	1,015	78.1	18.6	3.3	59.5
29 Dec – 4 Jan	Morning Consult	N/A	63	24	12	39

==== 2025 ====
Fieldwork date	Polling firm	Sample size	Approve	Disapprove	Und. / no answer	Lead
20–21 Dec	Sankei/FNN	1,021	75.9	18.9	5.2	57
20–21 Dec	Asahi	1,195	68	19	13	49
20–21 Dec	Mainichi/SSRC	1,907	67	22	11	45
20–21 Dec	Kyodo News	1,040	67.5	20.4	12.1	47.1
19–21 Dec	Nikkei/TV Tokyo	916	75	18	7	57
19–21 Dec	Yomiuri/NNN	1,034	73	14	13	59
13–14 Dec	ANN	1,040	63	19.4	17.6	43.6
13–14 Dec	Senkyo.com/JX	1,036	70.1 (Note: Strongly approve: 41.0%; Approve on balance: 29.1%)	17.2 (Note: Disapprove on balance: 6.1%; Strongly disapprove: 11.1%)	12.7	52.9
8–14 Dec	Morning Consult	N/A	61	26	13	35
5–8 Dec	Jiji Press	1,132	59.9	13.6	26.5	46.3
6–7 Dec	JNN	1,021	75.8	20.7	3.5	55.1
5–7 Dec	NHK	1,102	64.3	18.9	16.9	45.4
28–30 Nov	Nikkei/TV Tokyo	1,006	75	18	7	57
22–23 Nov	Sankei/FNN	1,020	75.2	19.6	5.2	55.6
22–23 Nov	Mainichi/SSRC	1,985	65	23	12	42
21–23 Nov	Yomiuri/NNN	1,054	72	17	11	55
15–16 Nov	Asahi	1,215	69	17	14	52
15–16 Nov	ANN	1,058	67.5	15.4	17.1	50.4
15–16 Nov	Senkyo.com/JX	1,003	66.3 (Note: Strongly approve: 41.8%; Approve on balance: 24.5%)	18.1 (Note: Disapprove on balance: 8.1%; Completely disapprove: 10.0%)	15.7	48.2
15–16 Nov	Kyodo News	1,046	69.9	16.5	13.6	53.4
6–12 Nov	Morning Consult	N/A	62	23	15	39
7–10 Nov	Jiji Press	1182	63.8	10.8	25.4	53
7–9 Nov	NHK	1,213	65.6	15.3	19.1	46.5
1–2 Nov	JNN	1,013	82	14.3	3.7	67.7
25–26 Oct	Sankei/FNN	1,021	75.4	19.1	5.5	56.3
25–26 Oct	Asahi	1,342	68	19	13	49
25–26 Oct	ANN	1,058	58.7	21.8	19.4	36.9
25–26 Oct	Mainichi/SSRC	2,045	65	22	13	43
24–26 Oct	Nikkei/TV Tokyo	1,059	74	19	6	55
21–22 Oct	Yomiuri/NNN	1,057	71	18	11	53
21–22 Oct	Kyodo News	1,053	64.4	23.2	12.4	41.2
21 Oct	Sanae Takaichi succeeds Shigeru Ishiba as Prime Minister of Japan. The Takaichi Cabinet is formed.					
11–13 Oct	NHK	1,205	52.3 (Note: Great expectations: 18.2%; Some expectations: 34.1%)	43.6 (Note: Not very high expectations: 26.7%; No expectations at all: 16.9%)	4.1	8.7
10–13 Oct	Jiji Press	1,164	43.8	23	33.3	10.5
11–12 Oct	Senkyo.com/JX	1,013	50.2 (Note: Strongly approve: 30.4%; Approve on balance: 19.8%)	30.4 (Note: Disapprove on balance: 10.8%; Completely disapprove: 19.6%)	19.5	19.8
4–6 Oct	Kyodo News	1,061	68.4	25.5	6.1	42.9
4–5 Oct	JNN	1,036	66	26	8	40
4 Oct	Sanae Takaichi is elected President of the LDP.					

=== Shigeru Ishiba ===
Approval Polling for the Ishiba Cabinet.

==== 2025 ====
Fieldwork date	Polling firm	Sample size	Approve	Disapprove	Und. / no answer	Lead
21 Oct	Sanae Takaichi succeeds Shigeru Ishiba as Prime Minister of Japan. The Takaichi Cabinet is formed.					
10–13 Oct	Jiji Press	1,164	25.1	48.2	26.7	21.5
11–12 Oct	Senkyo.com/JX	1,013	32.5 (Note: Strongly approve: 9.3%; Approve on balance: 23.2%)	42.6 (Note: Disapprove on balance: 13.9%; Completely disapprove: 28.7%)	24.9	10.1
1–7 Oct	Morning Consult	N/A	28	56	17	28
4–5 Oct	JNN	1,036	43.7	53	3.3	9.3
4 Oct	Sanae Takaichi is elected President of the LDP.					
27–28 Sep	ANN	1,025	34.3	47.1	18.6	12.8
26–28 Sep	Nikkei/TV Tokyo	915	37	57	6	20
20–21 Sep	Sankei/FNN	1,018	37.9	56	6.1	18.1
20–21 Sep	Mainichi/SSRC	1,972	31	53	15	22
12–15 Sep	Jiji Press	1,162	27.7	48.3	24	20.6
13–14 Sep	Senkyo.com/JX	995	41.9 (Note: Strongly approve: 12.7%; Approve on balance: 29.2%)	34.3 (Note: Disapprove on balance: 13%; Completely disapprove: 21.3%)	23.8	7.6
13–14 Sep	Yomiuri/NNN	1,043	34	54	12	20
11–12 Sep	Kyodo News	1,040	34.5	51.4	14.1	16.9
7 Sep	Shigeru Ishiba announces he will resign as President of the LDP.					
6–7 Sep	Kyodo News	1,045	32.7	51.6	15.7	18.9
6–7 Sep	JNN	1,030	37.7	59.4	2.9	21.7
5–7 Sep	NHK	1,186	39.2	42.2	18.5	3
2–8 Sep	Morning Consult	N/A	25.5	57.9	16.6	32.4
29–31 Aug	Nikkei/TV Tokyo	955	42	53	5	11
23–24 Aug	Sankei/FNN	1,022	38.8	57.1	4.1	18.3
23–24 Aug	ANN	1,012	34.1	46.9	19	12.8
23–24 Aug	Mainichi/SSRC	2,046	33	53	14	20
23–24 Aug	Kyodo News	1,056	35.4	49.8	14.8	14.4
22–24 Aug	Yomiuri/NNN	991	39	50	11	11
16–17 Aug	Asahi	1,211	36	50	14	14
16–17 Aug	Senkyo.com/JX	1,000	45.8 (Note: Strongly approve: 14.7%; Approve on balance: 31.1%)	32.8 (Note: Disapprove on balance: 12.8%; Completely disapprove: 20%)	21.4	13
9–11 Aug	NHK	1,137	38.1	45.2	16.7	7.1
8–11 Aug	Jiji Press	1,138	27.3	49.6	23.1	22.3
3–9 Aug	Morning Consult	N/A	23	62	15	39
2–3 Aug	JNN	1,003	36.8	60.5	2.7	23.7
26–27 Jul	Sankei/FNN	1,030	34.6	60.3	5.1	25.7
26–27 Jul	Asahi	1,250	29	56	15	27
26–27 Jul	ANN	1,020	31.6	50.2	18.2	18.6
26–27 Jul	Mainichi/SSRC	2,045	29	59	13	30
25–27 Jul	Nikkei/TV Tokyo	937	32	61	7	29
21–22 Jul	Kyodo News	1,049	22.9	65.8	11.3	42.9
21–22 Jul	Yomiuri/NNN	1,043	22	67	11	45
20 Jul	2025 Japanese House of Councillors election					
11–14 Jul	Jiji Press	1,180	20.8	55	24.2	30.8
12–13 Jul	Senkyo.com/JX	991	35.5 (Note: Strongly approve: 11.3%; Approve on balance: 24.2%)	39.4 (Note: Disapprove on balance: 15.6%; Completely disapprove: 23.8%)	25	3.9
11–13 Jul	NHK	1,913	30.7	52.5	16.8	21.8
4–10 Jul	Morning Consult	N/A	23.3	61.7	15	38.4
5–6 Jul	ANN	1,048	29.1	51	19.9	21.9
5–6 Jul	Kyodo News	1,253	25.4	62.6	12	37.2
5–6 Jul	JNN	1,010	32.8	63.6	3.6	30.8
4–6 Jul	NHK	1,913	30.9	50.3	18.8	19.4
3–4 Jul	Asahi	11,164	24	57	19	33
28–29 Jun	Kyodo News	1,254	32.4	57.8	9.8	25.4
28–29 Jun	Mainichi/SSRC	2,050	24	61	15	37
27–29 Jun	Nikkei/TV Tokyo	775	37	57	6	20
27–29 Jun	Yomiuri/NNN	1,061	32	53	15	21
27–29 Jun	NHK	1,816	33.8	46	20.2	12.2
26–27 Jun	Agricultural News		47.7	52	0.3	4.3
21–22 Jun	ANN	1,031	29.1	49.6	21.3	20.5
21–22 Jun	Kyodo News	1,050	32.5	50.9	16.6	18.4
13–16 Jun	Jiji Press	1,162	27	48.4	24.6	21.4
14–15 Jun	Sankei/FNN	1,027	38.2	57.4	4.4	19.2
14–15 Jun	Asahi	1,256	32	52	16	20
14–15 Jun	Senkyo.com/JX	990	38.3 (Note: Strongly approve: 9.6%; Approve on balance: 28.7%)	38.6 (Note: Disapprove on balance: 14.2%; Completely disapprove: 24.4%)	23	0.3
14–15 Jun	Kyodo News	1,049	37	48.4	14.6	11.4
3–9 Jun	Morning Consult	N/A	22.5	63.2	14.3	40.7
7–8 Jun	ANN	1,025	34.4	46.4	19.2	12
6–8 Jun	NHK	1,201	39.1	41.8	19.2	2.7
31 May – 1 Jun	JNN	1,056	34.6	62	3.4	27.4
24–25 May	Kyodo News	1,064	31.7	52.6	15.7	20.9
23–25 May	Nikkei/TV Tokyo	892	34	60	6	26
16–19 May	Jiji Press	1,176	20.9	52.9	26.2	26.7
17–18 May	Sankei/FNN	1,025	32.9	61	6.1	28.1
17–18 May	Asahi	1,209	33	56	11	23
17–18 May	Senkyo.com/JX	986	33.1 (Note: Strongly approve: 8.3%; Approve on balance: 24.8%)	39.3 (Note: Disapprove on balance: 15.4%; Completely disapprove: 23.9%)	27.5	6.2
17–18 May	Kyodo News	1,064	27.4	55.1	17.5	27.7
17–18 May	Mainichi/SSRC	2,045	22	62	16	40
16–18 May	Yomiuri/NNN	1,072	31	56	13	25
10–11 May	ANN	1,016	27.6	48.7	23.8	21.1
9–11 May	NHK	1,216	33.4	48.1	18.5	14.7
2–8 May	Morning Consult	N/A	20.4	63.9	15.7	43.5
3–4 May	JNN	1,026	33.3	62.1	4.6	28.8
19–21 Apr	Nikkei/TV Tokyo	799	33	60	6	27
19–20 Apr	Sankei/FNN	1,015	33.3	61.5	5.1	28.2
19–20 Apr	Asahi	1,240	30	56	14	26
19–20 Apr	ANN	1,030	31.4	47.4	21.2	16
11–14 Apr	Jiji Press	1,140	23.1	51.2	25.7	25.5
12–13 Apr	Senkyo.com/JX	995	31.4 (Note: Strongly approve: 7.6%; Approve on balance: 23.8%)	39 (Note: Disapprove on balance: 16.3%; Completely disapprove: 22.7%)	29.5	7.6
12–13 Apr	Kyodo News	1,051	32.6	53.8	13.6	21.2
12–13 Apr	Mainichi/SSRC	2,040	24	61	15	37
11–13 Apr	Yomiuri/NNN	1,026	31	54	15	23
11–13 Apr	NHK	1,120	35.3	45.2	19.6	9.9
1–7 Apr	Morning Consult	N/A	18.8	66.1	15.1	47.3
5–6 Apr	JNN	1,031	30.6	66.1	3.3	35.5
22–23 Mar	Sankei/FNN	1,013	30.4	63	6.6	32,6
22–23 Mar	ANN	1,025	29.2	52.2	18.5	23
22–23 Mar	Kyodo News	1,046	27.6	57.8	14.6	30.2
21–23 Mar	Nikkei/TV Tokyo	847	35	59	6	24
15–16 Mar	Senkyo.com/JX	998	30 (Note: Strongly approve: 8.1%; Approve on balance: 21.9%)	43.9 (Note: Disapprove on balance: 19.3%; Completely disapprove: 24.6%)	26	13.9
15–16 Mar	Asahi	1,137	26	59	15	33
15–16 Mar	Mainichi/SSRC	2,047	23	64	13	41
14–16 Mar	Yomiuri/NNN	1,023	31	58	11	27
7–10 Mar	Jiji Press	1,186	27.9	44.1	28	16.2
7–9 Mar	NHK	1,225	36.2	44.8	19	8.6
27 Feb – 5 Mar	Morning Consult	N/A	24.6	56.8	18.6	32.2
1–2 Mar	JNN	1,027	38.4	57.7	3.9	19.3
22–23 Feb	Sankei/FNN	1,028	44.3	50.1	5.6	5.8
22–23 Feb	ANN	1,034	37.5	41.1	21.3	3.6
21–23 Feb	Nikkei/TV Tokyo	847	40	52	8	12
15–16 Feb	Senkyo.com/JX	1,004	40.6 (Note: Strongly approve: 9.7%; Approve on balance: 30.9%)	31.1 (Note: Disapprove on balance: 11.5%; Completely disapprove: 19.6%)	28.4	9.5
15–16 Feb	Asahi	1,111	40	44	16	4
15–16 Feb	Kyodo News	1,063	39.6	41.8	18.6	2.2
15–16 Feb	Mainichi/SSRC	2,043	30	54	16	24
14–16 Feb	Yomiuri/NNN	1,033	39	43	18	4
7–9 Feb	NHK	1,212	43.8	34.6	21.6	9.2
6–9 Feb	Jiji Press	1,126	28.5	40.1	31.4	8.6
1–2 Feb	JNN	1,010	37.1	59.7	3.2	22.6
21–27 Jan	Morning Consult	N/A	24.6	54	21.4	29.4
25–26 Jan	ANN	1,030	36.2	41.3	22.5	5.1
25–26 Jan	Kyodo News	1,064	35.7	49.2	15.1	13.5
24–26 Jan	Nikkei/TV Tokyo	946	43	50	7	7
18–19 Jan	Sankei/FNN	1,005	43.5	48.7	7.8	5.2
18–19 Jan	Asahi	1,103	33	51	16	18
18–19 Jan	Mainichi/SSRC	2,042	28	53	19	25
17–19 Jan	Yomiuri/NNN	1,015	40	46	14	6
11–13 Jan	NHK	1,211	38.7	39.8	21.5	1.1
10–13 Jan	Jiji Press	1,180	28.2	40.3	31.5	8.8
11–12 Jan	Senkyo.com/JX	996	36 (Note: Strongly approve: 10.5%; Approve on balance: 25.5%)	33.9 (Note: Disapprove on balance: 15.4%; Completely disapprove: 18.5%)	30.1	2.1
2–8 Jan	Morning Consult	N/A	24.5	54	21.5	29.5
4–5 Jan	JNN	1,018	41.4	55.2	3.4	13.8

==== 2024 ====
Fieldwork date	Polling firm	Sample size	Approve	Disapprove	Und. / no answer	Lead
20–22 Dec	Nikkei/TV Tokyo	774	41	51	8	10
14–15 Dec	Senkyo.com/JX	996	34.4 (Note: Strongly approve: 10%; Approve on balance: 24.4%)	35.9 (Note: Disapprove on balance: 15.9%; Completely disapprove: 20%)	29.7	1.5
14–15 Dec	Sankei/FNN	1,020	45.9	47.7	6.4	1.8
14–15 Dec	Asahi	1,049	36	43	21	7
14–15 Dec	Mainichi/SSRC	2,045	30	53	17	23
14–15 Dec	Kyodo News	1,056	36.5	43.1	20.4	6.6
13–15 Dec	Yomiuri/NNN	1,018	39	48	13	9
6–9 Dec	Jiji Press	1,152	26.8	41.3	31.9	9.4
6–9 Dec	NHK	1,224	37.7	38.3	24	0.6
7–8 Dec	ANN	1,017	38.5	39.8	21.6	1.3
26 Nov – 2 Dec	Morning Consult	N/A	24.4	53.5	22.1	29.1
30 Nov – 1 Dec	JNN	1,003	42.1	52.4	5.5	10.3
23–24 Nov	Mainichi/SSRC	1,919	31	50	20	19
16–17 Nov	Kyodo News	1,021	40	38.8	21.2	1.2
16–17 Nov	Senkyo.com/JX	1,003	39.7 (Note: Strongly approve: 10%; Approve on balance: 29.7%)	29.9 (Note: Disapprove on balance: 13.3%; Completely disapprove: 16.6%)	30.5	9.8
15–17 Nov	NHK	1,213	40.8	37	22.2	3.8
15–17 Nov	Nikkei/TV Tokyo	800	46	46	8	Tie
11–12 Nov	Yomiuri/NNN	1,054	43	42	15	1
11 Nov	The Second Ishiba Cabinet is formed.					
8–11 Nov	Jiji Press	1,190	28.7	38.3	33	5.3
9–10 Nov	ANN	1,025	38.3	37.3	24.4	1
29 Oct – 4 Nov	Morning Consult	N/A	23	53.4	23.6	29.8
2–3 Nov	Sankei/FNN	1,012	43.8	49.8	6.4	6
2–3 Nov	Asahi	980	34	47	19	13
1–2 Nov	JNN	1,020	38.9	57.3	3.8	18.4
28–29 Oct	Yomiuri/NNN	1,068	34	51	15	17
28–29 Oct	Kyodo News	1,063	32.1	52.2	15.7	20.1

== See also ==
- Opinion polling for the 2021 Japanese general election
- Opinion polling for the 2024 Japanese general election
