= Aichi 1st district =

Legislative district of Japan

- Parliamentary constituency for the Japanese House of Representatives

- Numbered map of Aichi Prefecture single-member districts
- Prefecture: Aichi
- Proportional District: Tokai
- Electorate: 406,526

Current constituency
- Created: 1994
- Seats: One
- Party: Genzei-Yukoku
- Representative: Takashi Kawamura
- Municipalities: Higashi-ku, Kita-ku, Nishi-ku, and Naka-ku of Nagoya City

Aichi 1st district (愛知県第1区, Aichi-ken dai-ikku or simply 愛知1区, Aichi-ken ikku) is a single-member constituency of the House of Representatives in the national Diet of Japan located in Aichi Prefecture.

== Areas covered ==
=== since 1994 ===
- Nagoya City
  - Higashi-ku
  - Kita-ku
  - Nishi-ku
  - Naka-ku

== List of representatives ==
Election	Representative	Party	Notes
1996	Takashi Kawamura	New Frontier	
1996	Takashi Kawamura	Liberal	
1996	Takashi Kawamura	Independent	
2000	Takashi Kawamura	Democratic	
2003	Takashi Kawamura	Democratic	
2005	Takashi Kawamura	Democratic	
Vacant (April 2009 - August 2009)
2009	Yuko Sato	Democratic	
2009	Yuko Sato	Genzei Nippon	
2009	Yuko Sato	Tax Cuts Japan	
2009	Yuko Sato	Tomorrow	
2012	Hiromichi Kumada	Liberal Democratic	
2014	Hiromichi Kumada	Liberal Democratic	
2017	Hiromichi Kumada	Liberal Democratic	
2021	Hiromichi Kumada	Liberal Democratic	
2024	Takashi Kawamura	Conservative	
2026	Takashi Kawamura	Tax Cuts–Yukoku	

== Election results ==
=== 2026 ===
2026
Party	Candidate	Votes	%	±%
Genzei–Yukoku	Takashi Kawamura (incumbent)	94,339	42.5	▼4.1
LDP	Hiromichi Kumada (elected in Tōkai PR block)	72,144	35.2	▲11.4
Centrist Reform	Tsunehiko Yoshida	40,038	18.1	▼5.5
Sanseitō	Akane Konda	15,283	6.9	
Registered electors		413,156		
Turnout			54.50	▲3.69
Genzei–Yukoku hold				

=== 2024 ===
2024
Party	Candidate	Votes	%	±%
Conservative	Takashi Kawamura	95,613	46.62	New
Constitutional Democratic	Tsunehiko Yoshida (PR seat incumbent)	48,304	23.55	
Liberal Democratic	Hiromichi Kumada (incumbent)	43,381	21.15	
Ishin	Kōichi Yamamoto	17,810	8.68	New
Majority		47,309	23.07	
Registered electors		409,375		
Turnout			50.81	▲1.32
CPJ gain from LDP				

=== 2021 ===
2021
Party	Candidate	Votes	%	±%
Liberal Democratic (endorsed by Komeito)	Hiromichi Kumada (incumbent)	94,107	48.81	
CDP	Tsunehiko Yoshida (PR seat incumbent) (won PR seat)	91,707	47.57	New
Anti-NHK	Setsuko Kadota	6,988	3.62	New
Majority		2,400	1.24	
Registered electors		400,338		
Turnout			49.49	▲2.04
LDP hold				

=== 2017 ===
2017
Party	Candidate	Votes	%	±%
Liberal Democratic (endorsed by Komeito)	Hiromichi Kumada (incumbent)	74,298	41.11	
CDP	Tsunehiko Yoshida (won PR seat)	57,780	31.97	New
Kibō no Tō (endorsed by Genzei Nippon)	Yuko Sato	48,633	26.91	New
Majority		16,518	9.14	
Registered electors		388,992		
Turnout			47.45	▲0.24
LDP hold				

=== 2014 ===
2014
Party	Candidate	Votes	%	±%
Liberal Democratic (endorsed by Komeito, NRP)	Hiromichi Kumada (incumbent)	73,003	42.39	
Democratic	Tsunehiko Yoshida	49,230	28.59	
Communist	Hiromitsu Ohno	20,143	11.70	
Genzei Nippon	Ichiro Hirosawa	18,343	10.65	New
Future Generations	Sozaburo Mitamayama	6,422	3.73	New
Social Democratic	Ryohei Hirayama	5,076	2.95	N/A
Majority		23,773	13.80	
Registered electors		377,177		
Turnout			47.21	▼5.59
LDP hold				

=== 2012 ===
2012
Party	Candidate	Votes	%	±%
Liberal Democratic (endorsed by Komeito)	Hiromichi Kumada	77,215	40.73	
Tomorrow (endorsed by Daichi)	Yuko Sato (incumbent)	60,293	31.80	New
Democratic (endorsed by PNP)	Tsunehiko Yoshida	36,578	19.29	
Communist	Soramitsu Ohno	15,512	8.18	
Majority		16,922	8.93	
Registered electors		373,297		
Turnout			52.69	▼9.31
LDP gain from Tomorrow				

=== 2009 ===
2009
Party	Candidate	Votes	%	±%
Democratic	Yuko Sato	122,348	54.39	
Liberal Democratic	Yōsuke Shinoda (PR seat incumbent)	78,691	34.98	
Communist	Emi Kimura	14,485	6.44	
Social Democratic	Ryohei Hirayama	6,082	2.70	
Happiness Realization	Seiji Kawada	3,352	1.49	New
Majority		43,657	19.41	
Registered electors		369,526		
Turnout			62.00	▲2.31
Democratic hold				

=== 2005 ===
2005
Party	Candidate	Votes	%	±%
Democratic	Takashi Kawamura (incumbent)	105,449	49.96	
Liberal Democratic	Yōsuke Shinoda (won PR seat)	82,486	39.08	
Communist	Emi Kimura	15,585	7.38	
Social Democratic	Masakazu Kobayashi	7,560	3.58	New
Majority		22,963	10.88	
Registered electors		360,007		
Turnout			59.69	▲7.69
Democratic hold				

- Kawamura resigned as a lawmaker to run for the Nagoya mayoral election.

=== 2003 ===
2003
Party	Candidate	Votes	%	±%
Democratic	Takashi Kawamura (incumbent)	97,617	54.20	
Liberal Democratic	Takehiko Tanida (PR seat incumbent)	64,968	36.07	N/A
Communist	Emi Kimura	17,510	9.72	
Majority		32,649	18.13	
Registered electors		355,527		
Turnout			52.00	
Democratic hold				

=== 2000 ===
2000
Party	Candidate	Votes	%	±%
Democratic	Takashi Kawamura (incumbent)	79,817	42.08	New
Komeito (endorsed by LDP, NCP)	Yoneo Hirata (PR seat incumbent)	53,841	28.39	New
Independent	Masayuki Miyata	27,689	14.60	New
Communist	Yukiko Shintani	24,523	12.93	
Liberal	Akihiko Ishikawa	2,036	1.07	New
Liberal League	Masako Ito	1,770	0.93	New
Majority		25,976	13.69	
Turnout				
Democratic hold				

=== 1996 ===
1996
Party	Candidate	Votes	%	±%
New Frontier	Takashi Kawamura	66,876	40.03	New
Liberal Democratic	Norio Imaeda	42,969	25.72	New
Democratic	Taisuke Sato	33,503	20.06	New
Communist	Mihoko Iwanaka	22,209	13.29	New
Culture Forum	Masako Ito	616	0.37	New
People's Party	Hiroshi Yamada	566	0.34	New
Independent	Mitsuyuki Asano	312	0.19	New
Majority		23,907	14.31	
Turnout				
New Frontier win (new seat)				
