= Kinjo Gakuin University =

Japanese women's university

- 金城学院大学
- Type: Private women's university
- Established: 1889
- Location: Moriyama-ku, Nagoya, Aichi Prefecture, Japan; 35.210°N 136.996°E
- Website: www.kinjo-u.ac.jp/eng/index.html

Kinjo Gakuin University (金城学院大学, Kinjō gakuin daigaku) is a private women's university in Moriyama-ku, Nagoya, Aichi Prefecture, Japan.

It is scheduled to become coeducational in April 2029.

== History ==
The predecessor of the school was founded in 1889. It was chartered as a university in 1949. The university is named after Nagoya Castle, which has historically been also called Kinjō (金城 "Golden Castle"), due to its two golden shachihoko at the top of the roof of the main keep.

Kinjo Gakuin University has 14 undergraduate departments and majors covering a wide range of fields — from human/social science to natural science — and a graduate school in the humanities and in human ecology offering master's and doctoral degrees.

== Milestones ==
- 1889 Kinjo Girls' School (a private school) established
- 1927 Kinjo Girls' Vocational School established
- 1947 Under educational system reform, Kinjo Gakuen Junior High School established
- 1948 School renamed
- 1949 Kinjo Gakuin University (College of English Literature) established
- 1954 College of English Literature reorganized to Faculty of Literature
- 1962 College of Home Economics (present-day Human Life and Environment) established
- 1967 Graduate School of Humanities established
- 1996 Graduate School of Human Ecology established
- 1997 College of Contemporary Society and Culture established
- 2002 College of Human Sciences established
- 2005 College of Pharmacy established

== See also ==
- Junior College, Kinjo Gakuin University
- Ōmori-Kinjōgakuin-mae Station
