= Genzei Nippon =

Japanese regional political party

Genzei Nippon 減税日本
- Leader: Takashi Kawamura
- Founder: Takashi Kawamura
- Founded: April 26, 2010
- Headquarters: Nagoya, Aichi Prefecture
- Ideology: Japanese nationalism; Populism; Libertarianism
- National affiliation: Tax Cuts Japan (2012); Tomorrow (2012–2013); CPJ (2023–2025); Genzei–Yukoku (2026–present)
- Aichi Prefectural Assembly: 3 / 102
- Nagoya City Council: 8 / 68

Website
- genzeinippon.com

Genzei Nippon (減税日本; lit. 'Tax Reduction Japan') is a regional political party based in Nagoya, Japan and led by the former mayor of Nagoya, Takashi Kawamura. The party has been described as Japanese nationalist, populist, and libertarian.

The party was formed by Kawamura in April 2010. After briefly holding several seats in the national legislature, the party merged at the national level with the Tomorrow Party of Japan in November 2012 before that party's dissolution in May 2013. Genzei Nippon remained a separate party at the regional level and has been active within Aichi Prefecture. As well as Kawamura, the party has thirteen members serving on the Nagoya city council and three members serving on the Aichi Prefectural Assembly.

In October 2023, it was announced that the party would be affiliated on the national level with Naoki Hyakuta's far-right Conservative Party of Japan, but the relationship was severed in September 2025 after a feud between Kawamura and Hyakuta.

== History ==
The party was founded by Takashi Kawamura, then the mayor of Nagoya, and registered with the Aichi Prefectural electoral commission on 26 April 2010. At a press conference held on the same day, Kawamura emphasized the point that the greatest support that politicians can provide to citizens is a reduction in taxes.

The party first gained representation in the national Diet in May 2011 when Yuko Sato, the representative for the Aichi 1st district in the House of Representatives, officially resigned from the ruling Democratic Party of Japan (DPJ). Sato had lodged her resignation with the party in March in order to provide support to Genzei Nippon's candidates in the Nagoya city council election, but her application was put on hold while DPJ officials considered expulsion instead.

Two more DPJ members of the House of Representatives, Koki Kobayashi from the Tokyo proportional representation block and Toshiaki Koizumi of the Ibaraki 3rd district, left the party to join Genzei Nippon in August 2012. On 31 August, the three representatives joined with fellow DPJ defector Tomoyuki Taira to form the Genzei Nippon-Heian voting block within the House of Representatives, with Koizumi as the leader.

DPJ representatives Atsushi Kumada (Osaka 1st district) and Tomohiko Mizuno (Southern Kanto block) joined Genzei Nippon in October 2012, giving the party five Diet members, the minimum requirement for registration as an official party. The party was registered with Kawamura as the leader on 31 October 2012. On 13 November, Taira, who had remained an independent within the House, left the voting block to join Your Party, which led to the voting block being renamed Genzei Nippon.

On 22 November 2012, the party merged at the national level with the Anti-TPP, Zero Nuclear Party, which had been established just three days prior, to form the Tax Reduction, Anti-TPP, Zero Nuclear Party. A few days later this group further merged into the Tomorrow Party of Japan in order to contest the 2012 general election. Genzei Nippon continued to exist at the regional level following the national mergers, led by Kawamura. In the 2015 unified local elections, the party won 12 seats on the 75-seat Nagoya city council.

On 17 October 2023, during the first press conference and party meeting of the newly-founded Conservative Party of Japan, it was announced that Genzei Nippon would be affiliated nationally with the Conservative Party, with Kawamura becoming the Conservative Party's vice president.

Around the time of the election, reports emerged of internal tensions between Hyakuta and Kawamura regarding the party's management. In September 2025, Diet member Yuko Takegami, a close ally of Kawamura, left the party, citing disagreements with Hyakuta and Kawamura's marginalization in leadership decisions. Later that month, the party announced it was severing ties with Genzei Nippon, and Kawamura was removed from his position as co-leader. Kawamura was reportedly considering forming a new party in response.

== Presidents ==
No.	Name	Image	Term of office		National affiliation
No.	Name	Image	Took office	Left office	National affiliation
1	Takashi Kawamura		26 April 2010	Incumbent	Tax Cuts Japan (22–27 November 2012); Tomorrow Party (27 November 2012 – 17 May 2013); Conservative Party (17 October 2023 – 3 October 2025)

== See also ==
- Tax Cuts Japan
