= Aichi Prefectural Assembly =

Parliament of Aichi, Japan

Aichi Prefectural Assembly 愛知県議会 Aichi Kengikai

Type
- Type: Unicameral

History
- Founded: May 10, 1879

Leadership
- President (gichō): Hirofumi Kubota, Liberal Democratic Party
- Vice President (fuku-gichō): Tadashi Suzuki, Liberal Democratic Party

Structure
- Seats: 102

Elections
- Voting system: Single non-transferable vote
- Last election: 2019

Meeting place
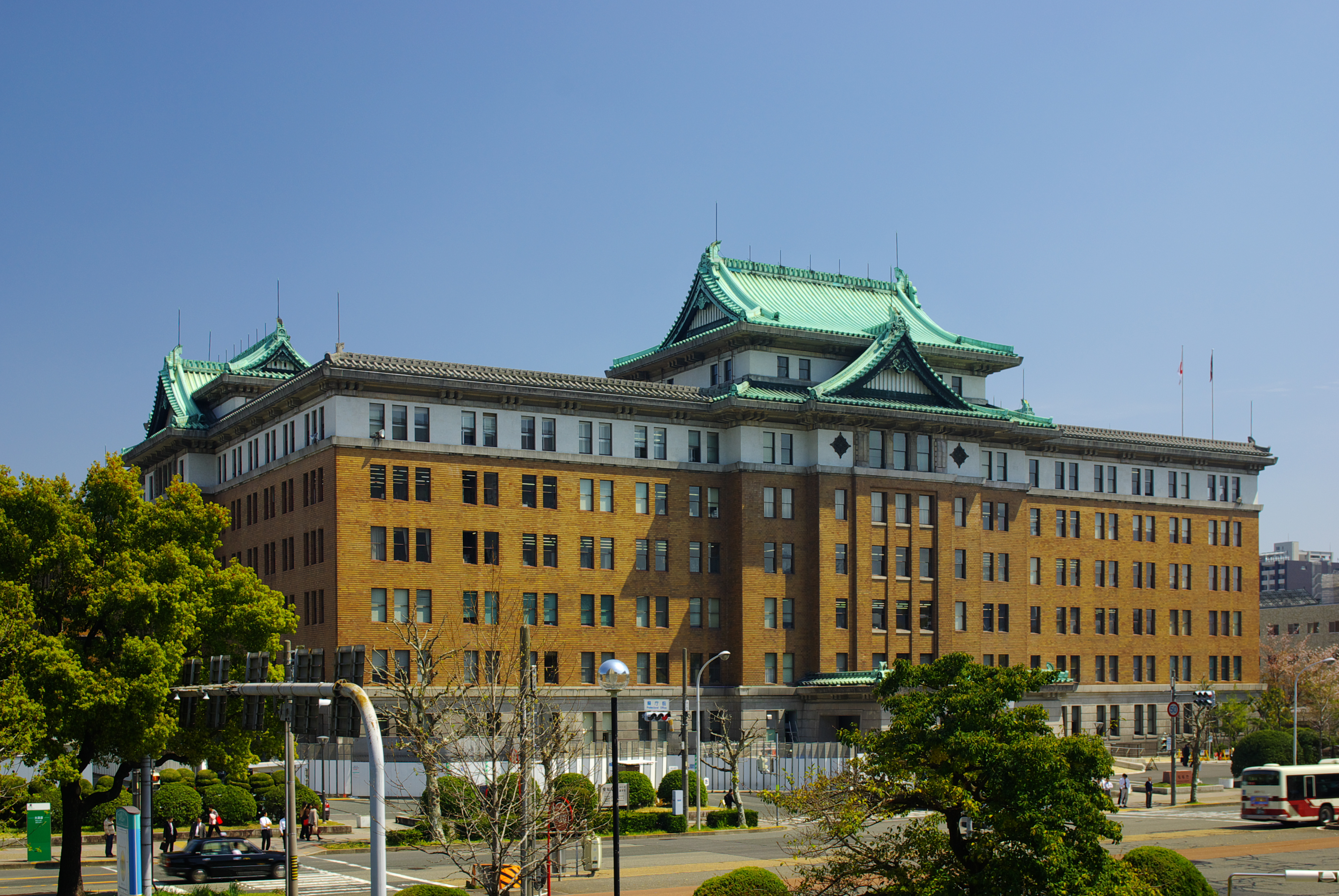

Website
- http://www.pref.aichi.jp/gikai/

The Aichi Prefectural Assembly (愛知県議会, Aichi-kengikai) is the legislative assembly of Aichi Prefecture.

Its 103 members are elected in 57 districts by single non-transferable vote (SNTV) to four-year terms.

The assembly is responsible for enacting and amending prefectural ordinances, voting on important administrative appointments made by the governor including the vice-governors and approving the budget – Aichi has been in recent years the only prefecture besides Tokyo with a "fiscal strength index" (zaiseiryoku shisū) above 1, i.e. it is able to cover its calculated expenses with its own revenues.

== Current composition ==
The last elections were held in the unified local elections in April 2011: the Liberal Democratic Party remained strongest party with 49 seats but fell short of a majority without independents, former Democrat and Nagoya City mayor Takashi Kawamura's Genzei Nippon ("Tax cuts Japan") and former Liberal Democrat and Aichi governor Hideaki Ōmura's Nippon-ichi Aichi no Kai ("Aichi First in Japan Association") together won 18 seats. The Democratic Party was reduced to 26 seats – down from 38 in 2007 – in one of its few (relative) strongholds in local politics. Kōmeitō won six seats, four seats went to independents. The Japanese Communist Party has not been represented in the assembly since 2003.

As of March 2014, the assembly is composed as follows:

Composition of the Aichi Prefectural Assembly
Parliamentary group	Seats
LDP Aichi	57
DPJ Aichi	34
Genzei Nippon-ichi Aichi	1
Kōmeitō Aichi	6
Independents	4
Total	96 (7 vacant seats)

== Electoral districts ==
As in all prefectures, most electoral districts correspond to wards of "major cities designated by government ordinance" (Nagoya City), ordinary cities and former counties. 28 districts are single-member districts where the single non-transferable vote becomes equivalent to first-past-the-post voting and a plurality of votes suffices to win 100% of seats. 20 districts are two-member districts where usually – depending on nomination strategy and local strength of third parties – an even seat split between the major two parties is likely (in the absence of third parties and assuming realistic nomination strategies, winning both seats would require at least a two-thirds majority of votes). Nine districts elect three or more assembly members.

Electoral districts			Incumbents (as of March 2014)
District	Municipalities, Nagoya City wards	Magnitude	Incumbents (as of March 2014)
Nagoya City Chikusa Ward	Chikusa Ward, Nagoya City	2	Yūko Higashi (Genzei Nippon-ichi Aichi, 1st term)
Nagoya City Chikusa Ward	Chikusa Ward, Nagoya City	2	vacant
Nagoya City Higashi ("East") Ward	Higashi Ward, Nagoya City	1	Masahiko Andō (Genzei Nippon-ichi Aichi, 2nd term)
Nagoya City Kita ("North") Ward	Kita Ward, Nagoya City	3	Kumeo Arafuka (Genzei Nippon-ichi Aichi, 1st term)
Nagoya City Kita ("North") Ward	Kita Ward, Nagoya City	3	Akiyoshi Inukai (Kōmeitō, 1st term)
Nagoya City Kita ("North") Ward	Kita Ward, Nagoya City	3	Hisashi Tsukamoto (DPJ, 9th term)
Nagoya City Nishi ("West") Ward	Nishi Ward, Nagoya City	2	vacant
Nagoya City Nishi ("West") Ward	Nishi Ward, Nagoya City	2	Kōji Handa (Genzei Nippon-ichi Aichi, 1st term)
Nagoya City Nakamura Ward	Nakamura Ward, Nagoya City	2	Mitsumu Teranishi (LDP, 1st term)
Nagoya City Nakamura Ward	Nakamura Ward, Nagoya City	2	Noboru Matsuyama (Independent, 7th term)
Nagoya City Naka ("Central") Ward	Naka Ward, Nagoya City	1	Atsushi Satō (Genzei Nippon-ichi Aichi, 1st term)
Nagoya City Shōwa Ward	Shōwa Ward, Nagoya City	2	Kikue Katō (Genzei Nippon-ichi Aichi, 1st term)
Nagoya City Shōwa Ward	Shōwa Ward, Nagoya City	2	Tomomi Taniguchi (DPJ, 2nd term)
Nagoya City Mizuho Ward	Mizuho Ward, Nagoya City	2	Ichirō Hirosawa (Genzei Nippon-ichi Aichi, 1st term)
Nagoya City Mizuho Ward	Mizuho Ward, Nagoya City	2	Tarō Kawashima (LDP, 2nd term)
Nagoya City Atsuta Ward	Atsuta Ward, Nagoya City	1	Yoshiaki Kajiyama (DPJ, 3rd term)
Nagoya City Nakagawa Ward	Nakagawa Ward, Nagoya City	3	Hidekazu Kitō (Kōmeitō, 6th term)
Nagoya City Nakagawa Ward	Nakagawa Ward, Nagoya City	3	Atsushi Nishikawa (DPJ, 3rd term)
Nagoya City Nakagawa Ward	Nakagawa Ward, Nagoya City	3	Kazuhito Inamoto (Independent, 1st term)
Nagoya City Minato Ward	Minato Ward, Nagoya City	2	Noboru Hiraiwa (Genzei Nippon-ichi Aichi, 1st term)
Nagoya City Minato Ward	Minato Ward, Nagoya City	2	Hirobumi Naoe (LDP, 8th term)
Nagoya City Minami ("South") Ward	Minami Ward, Nagoya City	2	Tomoko Akae (Genzei Nippon-ichi Aichi, 1st term)
Nagoya City Minami ("South") Ward	Minami Ward, Nagoya City	2	Tatsuo Itō (LDP, 2nd term)
Nagoya City Moriyama Ward	Moriyama Ward, Nagoya City	2	Katsuhiro Tanabe (LDP, 4th term)
Nagoya City Moriyama Ward	Moriyama Ward, Nagoya City	2	Rumi Noda (Genzei Nippon-ichi Aichi, 1st term)
Nagoya City Midori Ward	Midori Ward, Nagoya City	3	Yoshizumi Miyachi (Genzei Nippon-ichi Aichi, 1st term)
Nagoya City Midori Ward	Midori Ward, Nagoya City	3	Tomomi Nakamura (DPJ, 7th term)
Nagoya City Midori Ward	Midori Ward, Nagoya City	3	Noboru Watanabe (LDP, 2nd term)
Nagoya City Meitō Ward	Meitō Ward, Nagoya City	2	Isao Miyake (Genzei Nippon-ichi Aichi, 1st term)
Nagoya City Meitō Ward	Meitō Ward, Nagoya City	2	Takaya Tsutsui (LDP, 10th term)
Nagoya City Tenpaku Ward	Tenpaku Ward, Nagoya City	2	vacant
Nagoya City Tenpaku Ward	Tenpaku Ward, Nagoya City	2	Kan Susaki (LDP, 2nd term)
Toyohashi City	Toyohashi City	5	Akikatsu Watarai (Kōmeitō, 4th term)
Toyohashi City	Toyohashi City	5	Mitsuo Kokubo (Independent, 5th term)
Toyohashi City	Toyohashi City	5	Takamasa Suzuki (LDP, 4th term)
Toyohashi City	Toyohashi City	5	Yoshitaka Asai (DPJ, 2nd term)
Toyohashi City	Toyohashi City	5	Mitsuyo Kashiwaguma (DPJ, 7th term)
Okazaki City	Okazaki City	4	Nagashi Nishikubo (DPJ, 1st term)
Okazaki City	Okazaki City	4	Akio Aoyama (LDP, 6th term)
Okazaki City	Okazaki City	4	Yoshitaka Nakane (LDP, 1st term)
Okazaki City	Okazaki City	4	Masato Suzuki (Genzei Nippon-ichi Aichi, 1st term)
Ichinomiya City	Ichinomiya City	5	Toshirō Kitō (Kōmeitō, 3rd term)
Ichinomiya City	Ichinomiya City	5	Masako Takahashi (DPJ, 3rd term)
Ichinomiya City	Ichinomiya City	5	Shinji Iwamura (LDP, 6th term)
Ichinomiya City	Ichinomiya City	5	vacant
Ichinomiya City	Ichinomiya City	5	Masato Yoshida (LDP, 3rd term)
Seto City	Seto City	2	Makoto Shimakura (LDP, 1st term)
Seto City	Seto City	2	Masanari Nagae (DPJ, 2nd term)
Handa City	Handa City	2	Ryōzō Kondō (DPJ, 6th term)
Handa City	Handa City	2	Jun'ichi Horisaki (LDP, 1st term)
Kasugai City	Kasugai City	4	Hiromi Kanbe (LDP, 3rd term)
Kasugai City	Kasugai City	4	Katsundo Itō (LDP, 3rd term)
Kasugai City	Kasugai City	4	Hideo Ichikawa (Kōmeitō, 1st term)
Kasugai City	Kasugai City	4	Takemasa Hibi (DPJ, 1st term)
Toyokawa City	Toyokawa City	3	Isao Kobayashi (LDP, 5th term)
Toyokawa City	Toyokawa City	3	Hiroki Fujiwara (LDP, 1st term)
Toyokawa City	Toyokawa City	3	Yasushi Nonaka (Genzei Nippon-ichi Aichi, 1st term)
Tsushima City	Tsushima City	1	Harumi Nakano (LDP, 3rd term)
Hekinan City	Hekinan City	1	Hideo Kobayashi (LDP, 7th term)
Kariya City	Kariya City	2	vacant
Kariya City	Kariya City	2	Masahiko Nagai (DPJ, 1st term)
Toyota City	Toyota City	5	Susumu Nakamura (DPJ, 2nd term)
Toyota City	Toyota City	5	Takashi Miura (LDP, 4th term)
Toyota City	Toyota City	5	Toshihiko Kurachi (LDP, 11th term)
Toyota City	Toyota City	5	Yoshikazu Kotama (DPJ, 1st term)
Toyota City	Toyota City	5	Takeyuki Kojima (Kōmeitō, 4th term)
Anjō City	Anjō City	2	Keisuke Naka (DPJ, 3rd term)
Anjō City	Anjō City	2	vacant
Nishio City	Nishio City w/o former Hazu County	2	Man'ichirō Kawakami (LDP, 7th term)
Nishio City	Nishio City w/o former Hazu County	2	Masatoshi Inagaki (DPJ, 1st term)
Gamagōri City	Gamagōri City	1	Tsunetoshi Hida (LDP, 1st term)
Inuyama City	Inuyama City	1	Yoshinobu Hara (LDP, 2nd term)
Tokoname City	Tokoname City	1	Marushirō Sawada (LDP, 4th term)
Kōnan City	Kōnan City	1	Yūji Okumura (LDP, 4th term)
Komaki City	Komaki City	2	Tomoya Yamashita (LDP, 1st term)
Komaki City	Komaki City	2	vacant
Inazawa City	Inazawa City	2	Hirofumi Kubota (LDP, 5th term)
Inazawa City	Inazawa City	2	Jun Suzuki (DPJ, 2nd term)
Shinshiro City and North Shitara County	Shinshiro City; Shitara Town; Tōei Town; Toyone Village	1	Osamu Mineno (LDP, 2nd term)
Tōkai City	Tōkai City	2	Kazunori Saba (DPJ, 1st term)
Tōkai City	Tōkai City	2	Hakushi Jinno (LDP, 3rd term)
Ōbu City	Ōbu City	1	Katsuhiko Fukaya (LDP, 4th term)
Chita City	Chita City	1	Kazushi Satō (LDP, 1st term)
Chiryū City	Chiryū City	1	Takanobu Shibata (Independent, 2nd term)
OwariAsahi City	Owariasahi City	1	Shūzō Aoyama (LDP, 1st term)
Takahama City	Takahama City	1	Takashige Sugiura (LDP, 3rd term)
Iwakura City	Iwakura City	1	Toshinao Takakuwa (Genzei Nippon-ichi Aichi, 1st term)
Toyoake City	Toyoake City	1	Kenji Sakata (LDP, 2nd term)
Nisshin City and Aichi County	Nisshin City; Tōgō Town	1	Hirohito Kondō (LDP, 1st term)
Tahara City	Tahara City	1	Hiroshi Yamamoto (LDP, 1st term)
Aisai City	Aisai City	1	Goroku Yokoi (LDP, 4th term)
Kiyosu City, Kita-Nagoya City, West Kasugai County	Kiyosu City; Kitanagoya City; Toyoyama Town	2	Tomio Mizuno (LDP, 8th term)
Kiyosu City, Kita-Nagoya City, West Kasugai County	Kiyosu City; Kitanagoya City; Toyoyama Town	2	Toshiki Andō (DPJ, 2nd term)
Yatomi City	Yatomi City	1	Seimei Andō (LDP, 1st term)
Miyoshi City	Miyoshi City	1	Tasuku Oyama (DPJ, 2nd term)
Nagakute City	Nagakute City	1	Yoshiki Ishii (LDP, 2nd term)
Niwa County	Ōguchi Town; Fusō Town	1	Yoshihiro Suzuki (LDP, 2nd term)
Ama County	Ama City; Ōharu Town; Kanie Town; Tobishima Village	2	Aporo Ishizuka (LDP, 1st term)
Ama County	Ama City; Ōharu Town; Kanie Town; Tobishima Village	2	Setsuo Kurokawa (DPJ, 6th term)
Chita County 1	Agui Town; Higashiura Town	1	Yōsuke Kawai (DPJ, 1st term)
Chita County 2	Minamichita Town; Mihama Town; Taketoyo Town	1	Toshihisa Morishita (LDP, 2nd term)
Hazu County	Nishio City: former Isshiki, Kira and Hazu Towns	1	Kiyoharu Asai (Genzei Nippon-ichi Aichi, 3rd term)
Nukata County	Kōta Town	1	Tadashi Suzuki (LDP, 3rd term)
