= Junior College, Kinjo Gakuin University =

- 金城学院大学短期大学部
- Type: Private junior college
- Active: 1950–2004
- Location: Moriyama-ku, Nagoya, Aichi Prefecture, Japan; 35.2104°N 136.9950°E

Junior College, Kinjo Gakuin University (金城学院大学短期大学部, Kinjō Gakuin Daigaku Tanki Daigakubu) was a junior college in Moriyama-ku, Nagoya, Aichi Prefecture, Japan. Established in 1950, it stopped recruiting new students in 2002.

== See also ==
- Kinjo Gakuin University
