= Takashi Kawamura (politician) =

Japanese politician (born 1948)

- 河村 たかし
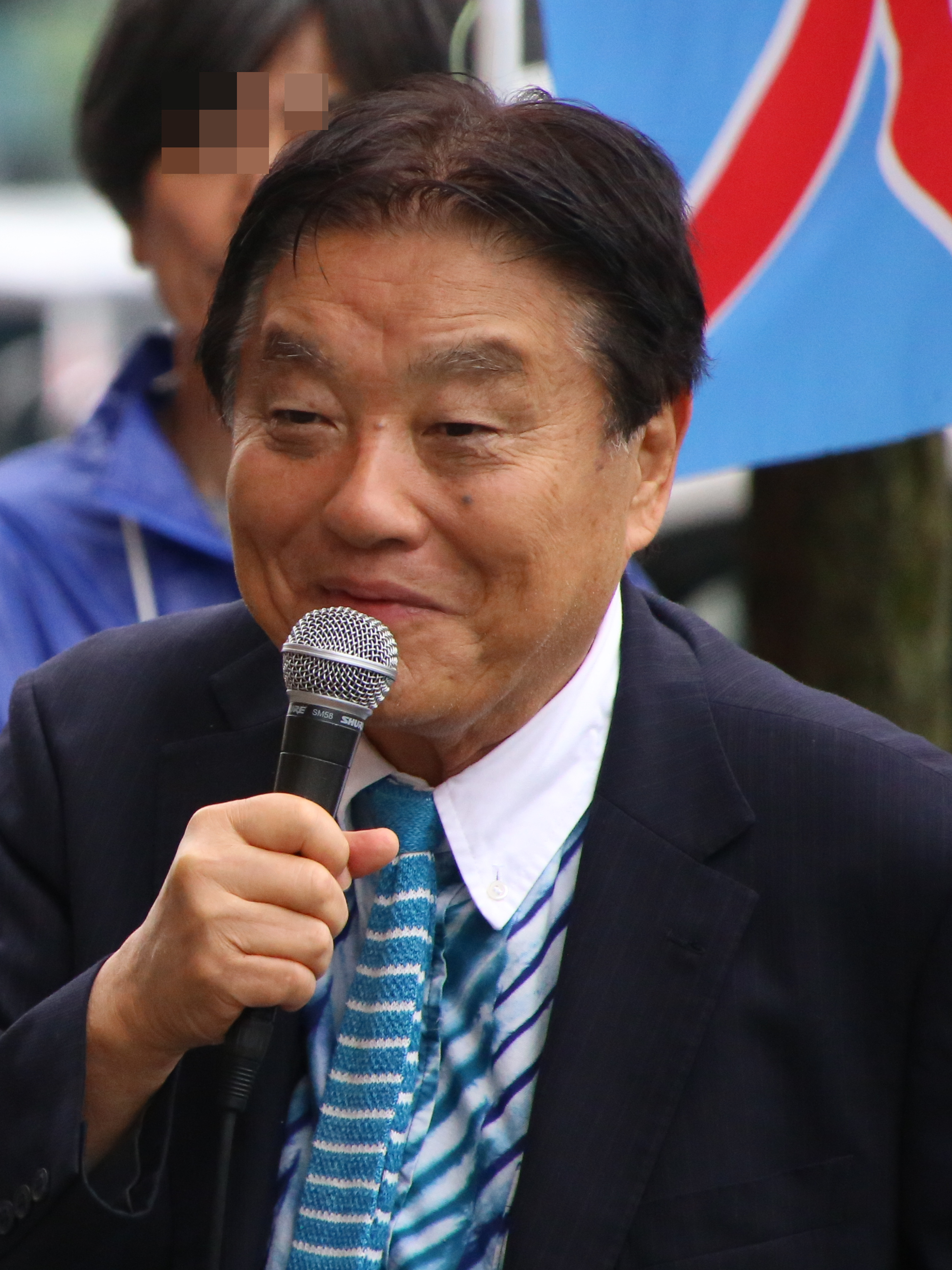
- Kawamura in 2024

Co-leader of Tax Cuts Japan and Yukoku Alliance
- Incumbent
- Assumed office 24 January 2026 Serving with Kazuhiro Haraguchi
- Preceded by: Office established

Leader of Genzei Nippon
- Incumbent
- Assumed office 26 April 2010
- Preceded by: Position established

Member of the House of Representatives for Aichi's 1st district
- Incumbent
- Assumed office 27 October 2024
- Preceded by: Hiromichi Kumada
- In office 19 July 1993 – 7 April 2009
- Preceded by: Taisuke Sato
- Succeeded by: Yuko Sato

Mayor of Nagoya
- In office 28 April 2009 – 15 October 2024
- Preceded by: Takehisa Matsubara
- Succeeded by: Ichiro Hirosawa

Personal details
- Born: 3 November 1948 (age 77) Nagoya, Aichi, Japan
- Party: Genzei Nippon (since 2010; regional); Genzei–Yukoku (since 2026; federal)
- Other political affiliations: DSP (before 1983); LDP (1990–1992); Independent (1992–1993; 1998–2000; 2009–2010); JNP (1993–1994); NFP (1996–1998); LP (1998); DPJ (2000–2009); TPJ (2012); CPJ (2023–2025)
- Spouse: Naoko Kawamura
- Children: 1
- Education: Hitotsubashi University
- Website: Official website

Takashi Kawamura (河村 たかし, Kawamura Takashi; born 3 November 1948) is a Japanese politician who has served as a member of the House of Representatives representing Aichi 1st since October 2024, a position he had previously held from 1993 to 2009. Prior to this, he served as the 35th mayor of Nagoya from 2009 to 2024. Kawamura was the Deputy Leader of the far-right Conservative Party of Japan, until a falling out with the leader, Naoki Hyakuta. He is also the founder and leader of the Nagoya-based regional party Genzei Nippon.

Kawamura's antics have earned him a peculiar reputation outside of Nagoya, but local voters see him as an exponent of Nagoya's unique culture who constantly speaks in strong dialect (Nagoya-ben). As of 2021, he has been elected for 4 terms as mayor, and there are 12 members of his Genzei Nippon party on the Nagoya City Council.

== Biography ==
=== Family ===
The family is from Kodekimachi in Higashi-ku, Nagoya. Kawamura's father Kaneo had served in the Second Sino-Japanese War (1937–1945) as a corporal (伍長) in the 101st Division, which was part of the Shanghai Expeditionary Army, taking part in the Battle of Nanjing. After the war ended in August 1945, he remained at the Qixia Temple outside of Nanjing until January 1946, and was repatriated in March of that year. In 1948 Kaneo started the family business of paper recycling, which continues to this day.

=== Education ===
In 1967 he graduated from Aichi Prefectural Asahigaoka Senior High School, where he had been a member of the badminton club. After a year spent studying to improve his test scores, he was accepted into Hitotsubashi University in 1968, where he studied business, graduating in 1972. After graduating, he joined the family business, eventually becoming CEO, a position which he passed on to his eldest son in 2002.

=== Aspiration for a legal career ===
From 1977 Kawamura aspired for a career as a public prosecutor, taking night school classes at Chukyo Law College, studying statutory interpretation and public administration for ten years. After nine attempts sitting for the bar examination, he passed the first round of testing four times. Although his grades in a legal cram school were good, he was never able to pass the second round of tests. He changed his plans and became involved in politics, joining the Democratic Socialist Party and acting as secretary to Ikkō Kasuga, but he "rubbed the dragon's scales the wrong way" and left the party.

=== Political career ===
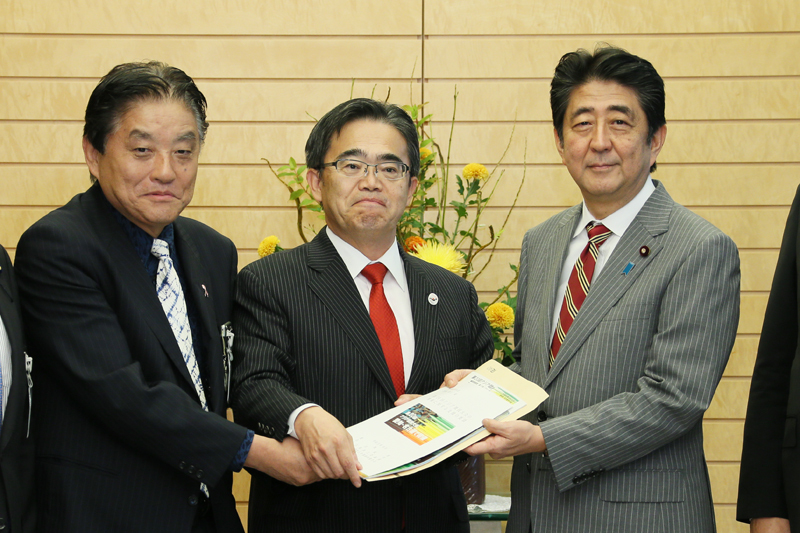
Kawamura with Hideaki Ōmura and Shinzo Abe (at the Prime Minister's Official Residence on October 21, 2016)

Kawamura was elected for the first time in 1993 as a member of Morihiro Hosokawa's Japan New Party after an unsuccessful run in 1990. He resigned from his office as a member of the House of Representatives, and ran for mayor of Nagoya, being elected in April 2009.

On February 6, 2011 he won a landslide re-election victory, gaining three times more votes than his DPJ rival. Three-quarters of voters have also supported a referendum to dissolve the sitting Nagoya assembly, after the mayor clashed with the assembly repeatedly on issues such as devolution and the cutting down of some of the generous diets and retirement packages of assembly members, in order to reduce costs for taxpayers.

The mayor announced plans in 2009 to completely reconstruct in wood the main towers of Nagoya Castle that were destroyed during the Second World War, just as in the original structure.

Kawamura was elected for his fifth term in April 2021, amid his role in a recall campaign scandal against Aichi governor Hideaki Omura.

In September 2025, after reports emerged of internal tensions between Hyakuta and Kawamura regarding the party's management around the time of the election, Diet member Yuko Takegami, a close ally of Kawamura, left the Conservative Party of Japan, citing disagreements with Hyakuta and Kawamura's marginalization in leadership decisions. Later that month, the party announced it was severing ties with Genzei Nippon, and Kawamura was removed from his position as co-leader. Kawamura was reportedly considering forming a new party in response. In October, Kawamura left the party and formed a parliamentary faction with Takegami entitled Genzei Hosyu Kodomo (減税保守こども).

== Controversy ==
=== Denial of Nanjing Massacre ===
On 20 February 2012, while serving as the Japanese representative of Nagoya, Mayor Takashi Kawamura made denialist statements about the Nanjing Massacre while receiving an official Chinese delegation from Nanjing. The incident led to the suspension of all official exchange between the two cities of Nagoya and Nanjing on 21 February.

Some Nagoya citizens opposed Takashi Kawamura's denial by organizing lectures and setting up a website.

=== Removal of comfort women statue ===
In August 2019, Kawamura demanded the removal of an art exhibition in the Aichi Triennale art exhibition because it depicted Korean 'comfort women', Korean women who worked in Japanese military brothels in WWII, often under violent and involuntary conditions. The statue was made by a South Korean artist. The exhibit itself was titled After "Freedom of Expression"? and the artists' description was as follows:

"This may seem like a little exhibition inside an exhibition. For one reason or another, due to censorship or self-censorship, most works presented here were not exhibited in the past in Japan. Although the reason for their removal varies, it shows that there is no simple dynamic in regard to "freedom of expression (speech)."

"Freedom of expression" is one of the essential ideas in democracy and basic human rights. However, nowadays freedom of expression which originally means the right to criticize authorities is a subject not only limited to policy-makers. With "freedom of expression" now also regulated to some extent when it may violate the human rights of others.

The exhibition provides you with information on who regulated these works, through which criteria and how, along with the background to each work, such works were censored."

Kawamura complained, saying on August 2, "Views that the matter (of comfort women) isn't factually correct are strong. It's unrelated to a lack of freedom of expression. It doesn't have to be displayed at a venue funded with a massive amount of taxpayers' money."

Additionally citing phone complaints and fears of threat of a terrorist attack, the artistic director decided to close down that section of the Aichi Triennale.

=== Olympic gold medal biting incident ===
During a press conference honoring Miu Goto, the softball pitcher from Nagoya who led the Toyota Red Terriers to win a gold medal during the 2020 Summer Olympics, Mayor Kawamura removed his COVID-19 mask and bit the gold medal belonging to Ms. Goto without her consent, to test if the medal was made of real gold. Additionally, Kawamura was accused of sexual harassment after asking Goto, "Are you prohibited from having romantic relationships?" His actions drew more than 7,000 complaints to city officials. Kawamura says that he will personally bear the expense of replacing the bitten medal and apologized for "making her uncomfortable."

On August 16, 2021, Mayor Kawamura made a formal apology, repeatedly bowing, and saying "I feel like such a pathetic person and am deeply ashamed." In his apology, Kawamura said, "My behavior is inexcusable" (mōshi wake gozaimasen (申し訳ございません)) five times. He announced his intention to take a 100% pay cut for three months; saying that he would submit a bill to the municipal assembly in September to implement the pay cut. His salary was 500,000 yen/month. Kawamura had originally offered to pay for a new medal, but under the Olympic Charter, this would fall into the category of a "political donation", which is prohibited.

=== Gold-biting incident of April 9, 2021 ===
The Olympic Medal incident is not the first time that Mayor Kawamura has displayed an urge to bite into a golden emblem in the presence of news media and photographers. In order to generate tourist activity, it was decided to remove the two golden shachihoko (mythical half-tiger, half-fish creature) from the roof of Nagoya Castle and put them on temporary display. The shachihoko were removed by helicopter on March 8. These shachihoko are important emblems of the city of Nagoya. At a special exhibition on April 9 in Sakae Plaza, Mayor Kawamura removed his COVID mask, placed his hands on the male shachi, and leaned forward to press his mouth, opened widely as though taking a large bite from the nose of the golden shachi. Guests had been asked to wear masks, disinfect their hands, and touch only the shachi's nose, but Mayor Kawamura placed his hands on other parts of the shachi as well.

Political offices
Preceded by Takehisa Matsubara	Mayor of Nagoya; 28 April 2009 – 15 October 2024	Succeeded by Ichirō Hirosawa
