= Tax Cuts Japan and Yukoku Alliance =

Political party in Japan

Tax Cuts Japan and Yukoku Alliance 減税日本・ゆうこく連合
- Abbreviation: Genzei–Yukoku
- Leaders: Kazuhiro Haraguchi; Takashi Kawamura
- Founders: Kazuhiro Haraguchi; Takashi Kawamura
- Founded: 24 January 2026
- Split from: Constitutional Democratic Party of Japan
- Regional affiliation: Genzei Nippon
- Colours: Blue; Red
- Senators: 0 / 248
- Representatives: 1 / 465

Website
- genzeiyukoku.jp

Tax Cuts Japan and Yukoku Alliance (Japanese: 減税日本・ゆうこく連合, Hepburn: Genzei Nippon Yūkoku Rengō) is a political coalition in Japan launched in January 2026 by House of Representatives members Kazuhiro Haraguchi and Takashi Kawamura. The alliance was formed to meet party requirements for participation in national elections. It promotes policies focused on tax reduction.

== History ==
In 2026, Kazuhiro Haraguchi and Takashi Kawamura jointly launched the party to meet the legal requirements for party registration.

== Election results ==
=== House of Representatives ===
| Election | Leader | Constituency | | | Party list | | | Seats | | Position | Status |
| Election | Leader | Votes | % | Seats | Votes | % | Seats | Total | +/- | Position | Status |
|---|---|---|---|---|---|---|---|---|---|---|---|
| 2026 | Kazuhiro Haraguchi; Takashi Kawamura | 354,617 | 0.63% | 1 / 289 | 814,874 | 1.42% | 0 / 176 | 1 / 465 | New | 8th | Opposition |

== See also ==
- Genzei Nippon – Japanese regional political party
