= 2026 Japanese general election in Northern Kanto =

- February 8, 2026

All 52 seats to the House of Representatives
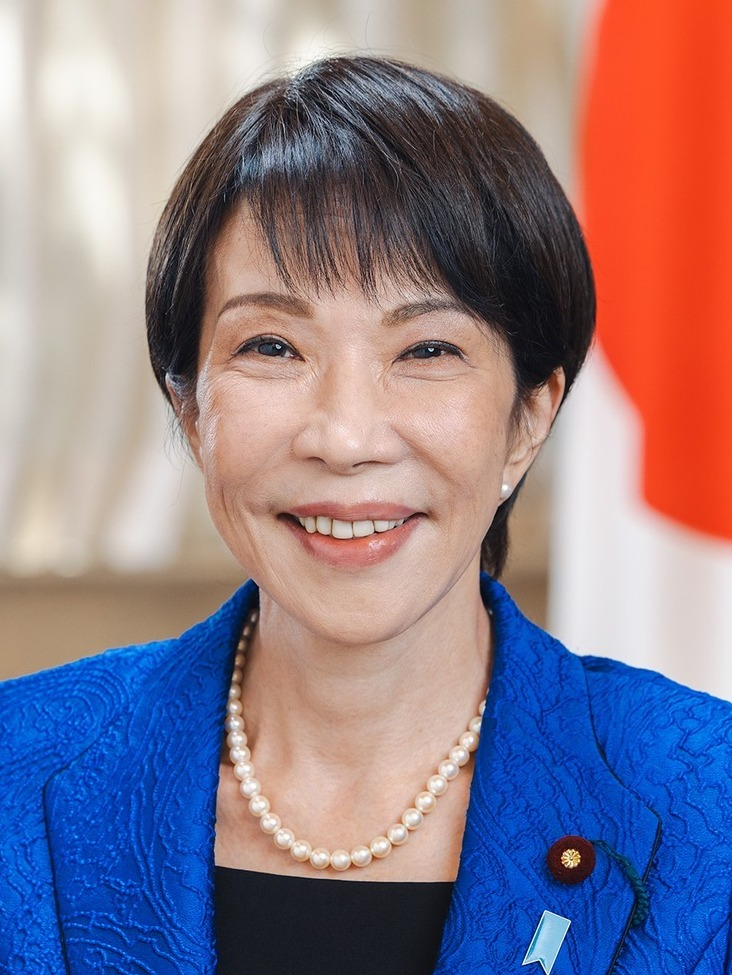

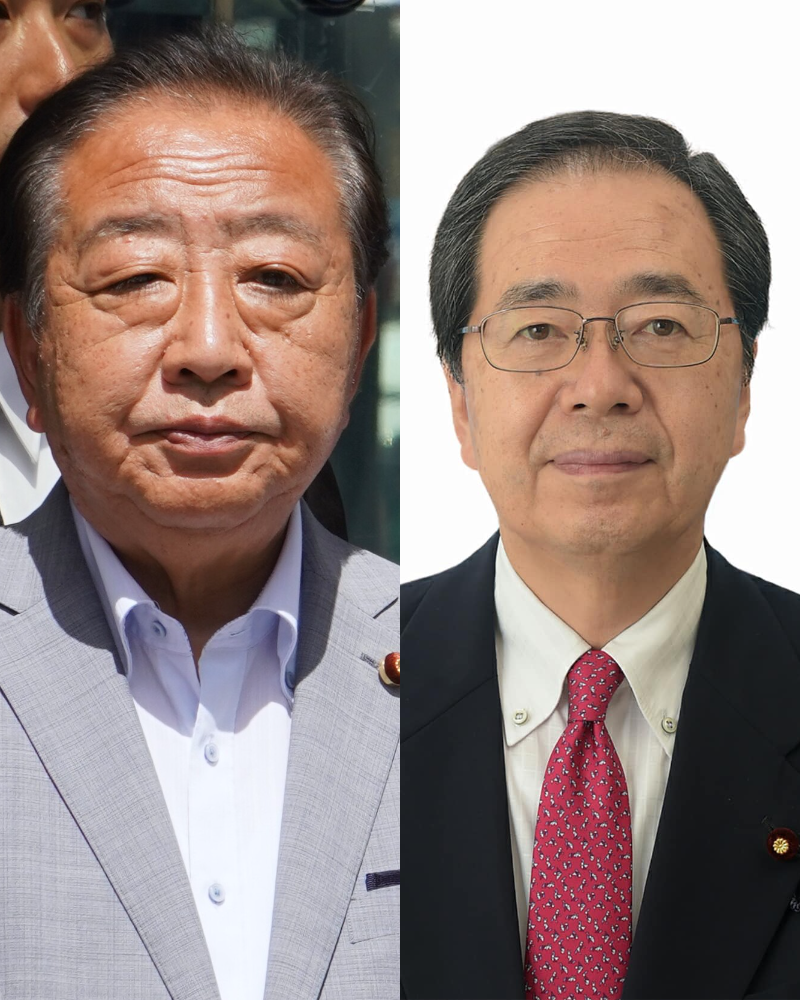

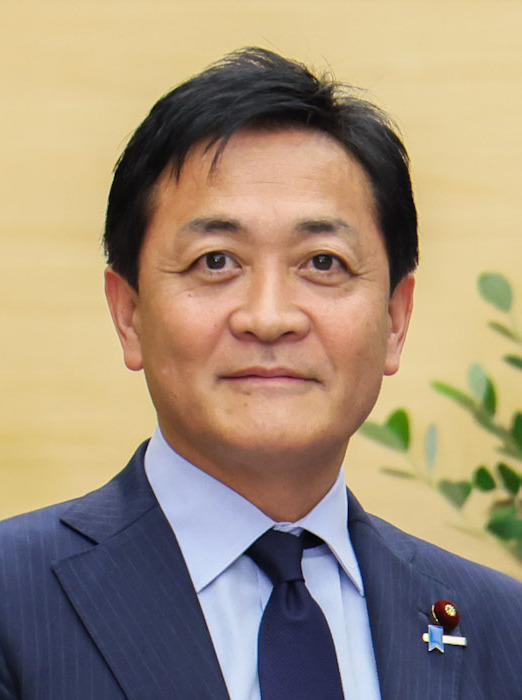

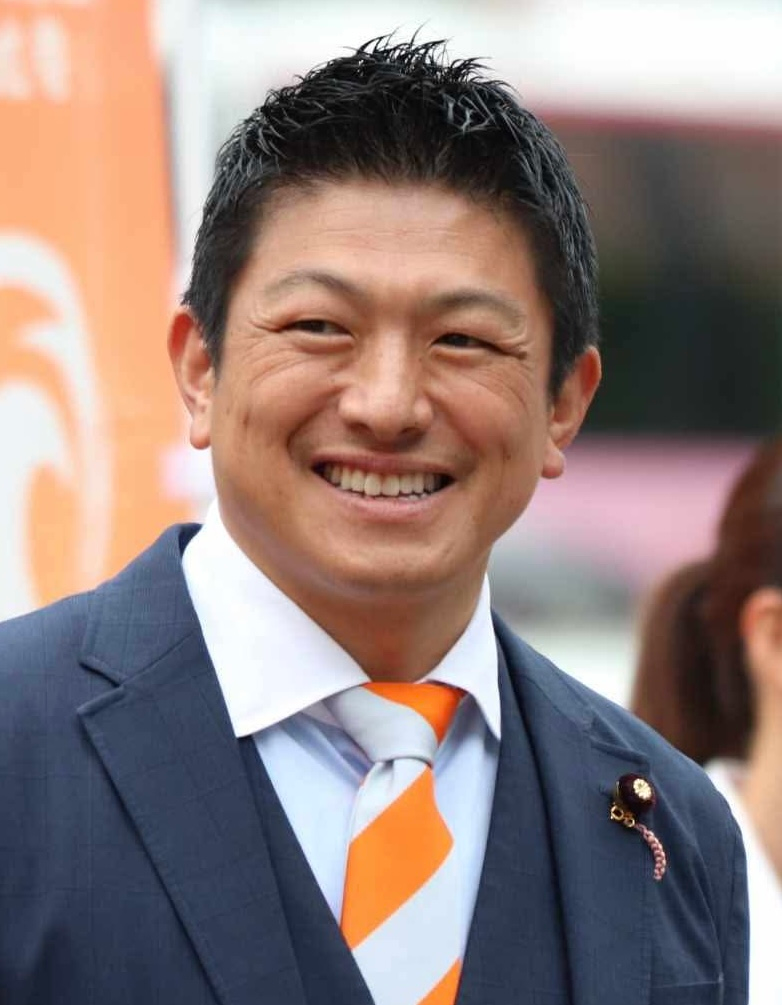

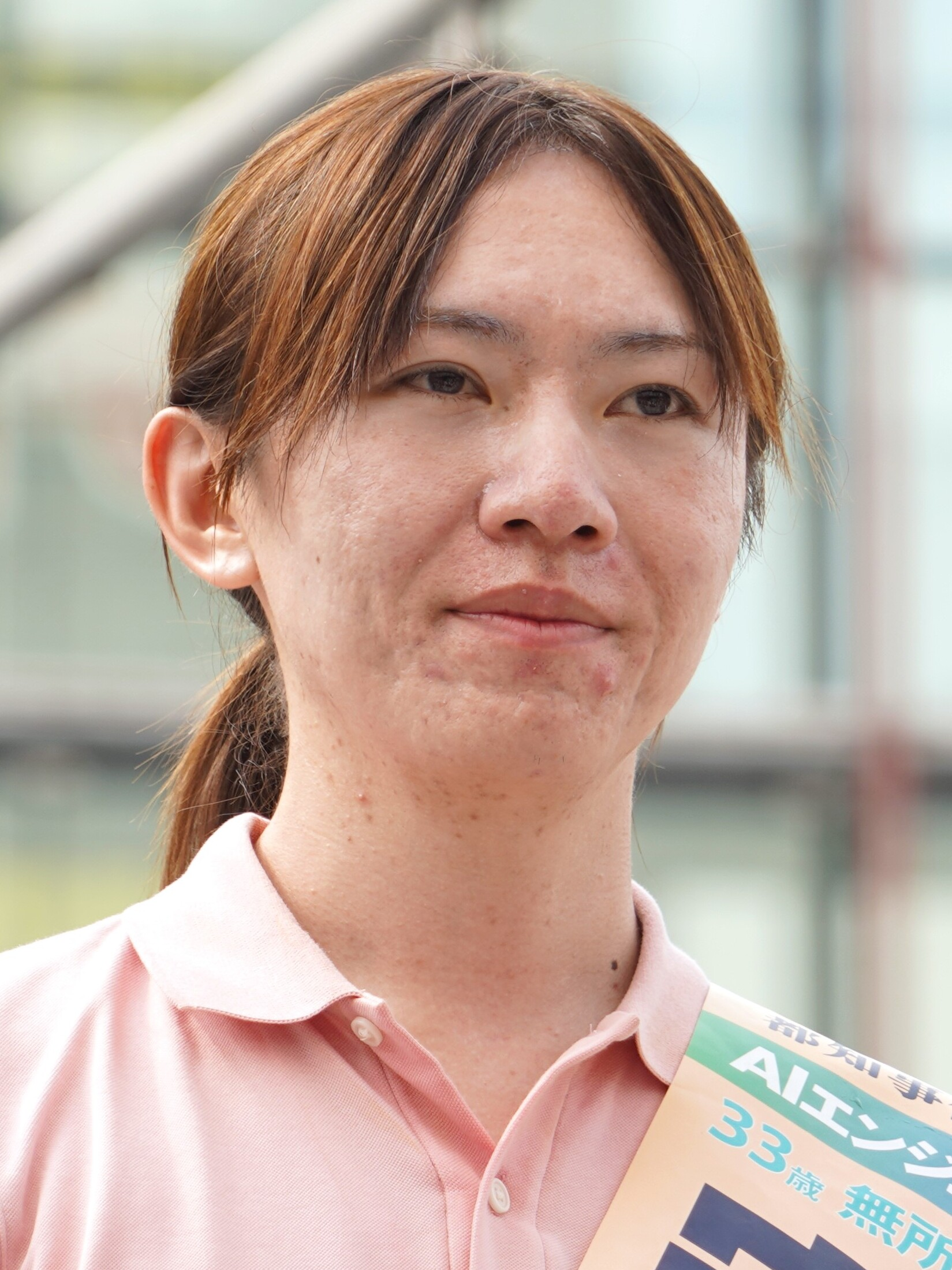

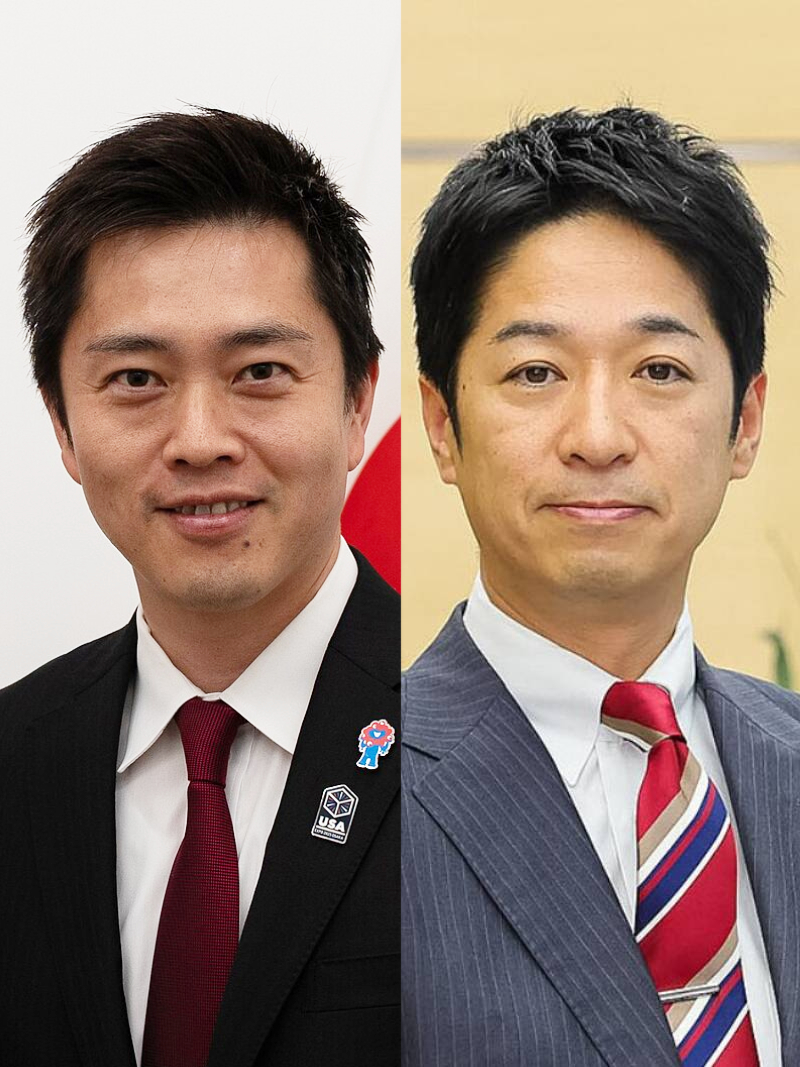

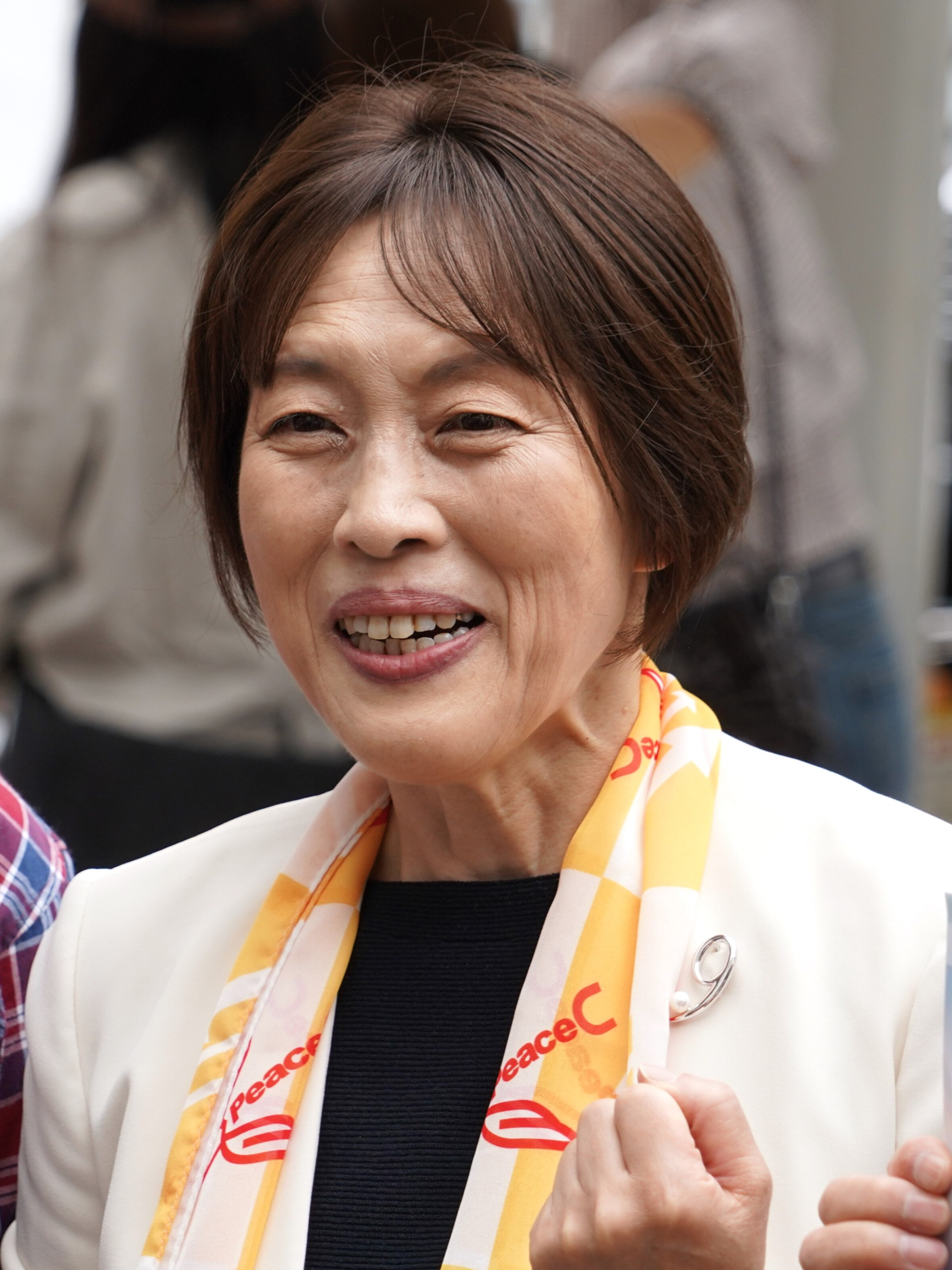
	Majority party	Minority party	Third party
Party	LDP	Centrist Reform	DPP
Last election	26 seats	17 seats (Note: As CDP and Komeito)	4 seats
Constituency	30	0	1
Constituency vote	3,071,965; 51.39%	1,262,258; 21.12%	389,868; 6.52%
PR seats	8	4	2
Regional vote	2,256,845; 37.02%	1,174,717; 19.27%	626,695; 10.28%
Total	38	4	3
Seat change	▲12	▼13	▼1
	Fourth party	Fifth party	Sixth party
Party	Sanseitō	Team Mirai	Ishin
Last election	0 seats	Did not exist	1 seats
Constituency	0	—	0
Constituency vote	466,862; 7.81%	—	130,444; 2.18%
PR seats	2	1	1
Regional vote	506,071; 8.30%	467,561; 7.67%	326,128; 5.35%
Total	2	1	1
Seat change	▲2	New	Steady
	Seventh party
Party	JCP
Last election	1 seats
Constituency	0
Constituency vote	197,727; 3.31%
PR seats	1
Regional vote	254,497; 4.17%
Total	1
Seat change	Steady

This page contains the detailed results for the 2026 Japanese general election in the Northern Kanto proportional representation block.

The Northern Kanto block covers the prefectures of Ibaraki, Tochigi, Gunma, and Saitama and elects 19 members by party-list proportional representation. In addition to the block seats, Northern Kanto has 33 constituencies each electing a single member by first-past-the-post voting.

== Overall results ==
The LDP swept all seats in Saitama Prefecture for the first time since the introduction of the single-member constituency system.

Party	Constituency			Proportional			Total seats
Party	Votes	%	Seats	Votes	%	Seats	Total seats
Liberal Democratic Party	3,071,965	51.39	30	2,256,845	37.02	8	38
Centrist Reform Alliance	1,262,255	21.12	0	1,174,717	19.27	4	4
Democratic Party For the People	389,868	6.52	1	626,695	10.28	2	3
Sanseito	466,859	7.81	0	506,071	8.30	2	2
Team Mirai				467,561	7.67	1	1
Nippon Ishin no Kai	130,444	2.18	0	326,128	5.35	1	1
Japanese Communist Party	197,727	3.31	0	254,497	4.17	1	1
Reiwa Shinsengumi	26,721	0.45	0	182,261	2.99	0	0
Conservative Party of Japan	7,471	0.12	0	150,809	2.47	0	0
Social Democratic Party				77,406	1.27	0	0
Tax Cuts Japan and Yukoku Alliance				73,111	1.20		
Independents	408,697	6.84	2				2
Others	15,213	0.25	0				0
Total	5,977,220	100.00	33	6,096,101	100.00	19	52
Invalid/blank votes	205,152	3.32		86,209	1.39		
Voter turnout	6,182,378	53.20		6,182,300	53.20		
Registered voters	11,621,084			11,621,084			

== Single-member constituencies ==
Single-member constituency results in Northern Kanto
Constituency	Previous member		Elected member		Votes	%	Margin	Status
Ibaraki 1st	Nobuyuki Fukushima	Ind.	Yoshinori Tadokoro	LDP	87,570	41.6	2,867	LDP gain from Ind.
Ibaraki 2nd	Fukushiro Nukaga	LDP	Fukushiro Nukaga	LDP	74,491	54.2	44,009	LDP hold
Ibaraki 3rd	Yasuhiro Hanashi	LDP	Yasuhiro Hanashi	LDP	103,231	51.3	47,088	LDP hold
Ibaraki 4th	Hiroshi Kajiyama	LDP	Hiroshi Kajiyama	LDP	106,286	83.1	84,676	LDP hold
Ibaraki 5th	Satoshi Asano	DPFP	Satoshi Asano	DPFP	70,438	60.4	24,297	DPFP hold
Ibaraki 6th	Yamato Aoyama	Ind.	Ayano Kunimitsu	LDP	107,388	43.2	2,544	LDP gain from Ind.
Ibaraki 7th	Hayato Nakamura	Ind.	Hayato Nakamura	Ind.	84,930	52.5	8,230	Ind. hold
Tochigi 1st	Hajime Funada	LDP	Hajime Funada	LDP	85,199	40.5	39,956	LDP hold
Tochigi 2nd	Akio Fukuda	CRA	Kiyoshi Igarashi	LDP	66,681	51.8	21,552	LDP gain from CRA
Tochigi 3rd	Kazuo Yana	LDP	Shintaro Watanabe	Ind.	58,483	43.9	4,508	Ind. gain from LDP
Tochigi 4th	Takao Fujioka	CRA	Masaru Ishizaka	LDP	87,743	47.1	13,278	LDP gain from CRA
Tochigi 5th	Toshimitsu Motegi	LDP	Toshimitsu Motegi	LDP	110,743	68.2	91,117	LDP hold
Gunma 1st	Yasutaka Nakasone	LDP	Yasutaka Nakasone	LDP	103,316	61.6	54,992	LDP hold
Gunma 2nd	Toshiro Ino	LDP	Toshiro Ino	LDP	84,167	52.7	61,940	LDP hold
Gunma 3rd	Hiroyoshi Sasagawa	LDP	Hiroyoshi Sasagawa	LDP	96,283	61.5	36,079	LDP hold
Gunma 4th	Tatsuo Fukuda	LDP	Tatsuo Fukuda	LDP	84,938	53.4	49,032	LDP hold
Gunma 5th	Yūko Obuchi	LDP	Yūko Obuchi	LDP	107,356	68.6	58,169	LDP hold
Saitama 1st	Hideki Murai	LDP	Hideki Murai	LDP	121,002	55.7	53,022	LDP hold
Saitama 2nd	Yoshitaka Shindō	LDP	Yoshitaka Shindō	LDP	75,209	41.8	29,688	LDP hold
Saitama 3rd	Hitoshi Kikawada	LDP	Hitoshi Kikawada	LDP	96,335	52.2	35,905	LDP hold
Saitama 4th	Yasushi Hosaka	LDP	Yasushi Hosaka	LDP	110,312	52.9	53,730	LDP hold
Saitama 5th	Yukio Edano	CRA	Yutaka Ihara	LDP	104,836	47.4	14,041	LDP gain from CRA
Saitama 6th	Atsushi Oshima	CRA	Akihito Obana	LDP	91,049	41.0	9,540	LDP gain from CRA
Saitama 7th	Yasuko Komiyama	CRA	Hideyuki Nakano	LDP	107,470	57.2	27,037	LDP gain from CRA
Saitama 8th	Masahiko Shibayama	LDP	Masahiko Shibayama	LDP	118,529	52.4	50,704	LDP hold
Saitama 9th	Shinji Sugimura	CRA	Taku Otsuka	LDP	112,062	55.0	20,257	LDP gain from CRA
Saitama 10th	Yūnosuke Sakamoto	CRA	Susumu Yamaguchi	LDP	95,847	55.3	18,362	LDP gain from CRA
Saitama 11th	Ryuji Koizumi	LDP	Ryuji Koizumi	LDP	88,744	53.4	56,236	LDP hold
Saitama 12th	Toshikazu Morita	CRA	Atsushi Nonaka	LDP	102,382	55.8	21,279	LDP gain from CRA
Saitama 13th	Mikihiko Hashimoto	DPFP	Hiromi Mitsubayashi	LDP	75,992	39.3	6,528	LDP gain from DPFP
Saitama 14th	Yoshihiro Suzuki	DPFP	Makoto Fujita	LDP	77,481	40.7	7,095	LDP gain from DPFP
Saitama 15th	Ryosei Tanaka	LDP	Ryosei Tanaka	LDP	114,320	52.3	57,314	LDP hold
Saitama 16th	Shinako Tsuchiya	LDP	Shinako Tsuchiya	LDP	98,187	55.8	34,035	LDP hold

=== Ibaraki Prefecture ===
Ibaraki Prefecture
Party	Constituency			Proportional	
Party	Votes	%	Seats	Votes	%
Liberal Democratic Party	601,807	49.99	5	496,556	40.76
Centrist Reform Alliance	86,622	7.20	0	225,690	18.53
Democratic Party For the People	86,888	7.22	1	119,899	9.84
Sanseito	96,779	8.04	0	101,621	8.34
Team Mirai				79,295	6.51
Nippon Ishin no Kai				65,793	5.40
Japanese Communist Party	44,354	3.68	0	40,387	3.32
Reiwa Shinsengumi	10,008	0.83	0	35,920	2.95
Conservative Party of Japan				26,056	2.14
Social Democratic Party				13,575	1.11
Tax Cuts Japan and Yukoku Alliance				13,372	1.10
Independents	277,459	23.05	1		
Total	1,203,917	100.00	7	1,218,164	100.00
Invalid/blank votes					
Voter turnout					
Registered voters					

Ibaraki 1st district
Party	Candidate	Constituency		Proportional	
Party	Candidate	Votes	%	Votes	%
Liberal Democratic Party	Yoshinori Tadokoro	87,570	41.61	85,777	40.51
Independent	Nobuyuki Fukushima	84,703	40.25		
Centrist Reform Alliance				39,823	18.81
Sanseito	Ayami Kawabata	25,327	12.04	19,025	8.99
Democratic Party For the People				18,621	8.79
Team Mirai				13,249	6.26
Nippon Ishin no Kai				11,506	5.43
Japanese Communist Party	Kumiko Ouchi	12,842	6.10	8,287	3.91
Reiwa Shinsengumi				6,123	2.89
Conservative Party of Japan				4,385	2.07
Social Democratic Party				2,667	1.26
Tax Cuts Japan and Yukoku Alliance				2,260	1.07
Total		210,442	100.00	211,723	100.00
Invalid/blank votes					
Voter turnout			51.92		
Registered voters		414,908		414,908	
LDP gain from Independent					

Ibaraki 2nd district
Party	Candidate	Constituency		Proportional	
Party	Candidate	Votes	%	Votes	%
Liberal Democratic Party	Fukushiro Nukaga	74,491	54.16	60,622	44.01
Centrist Reform Alliance	Takumi Onuma	30,479	22.16	25,821	18.74
Democratic Party For the People	Yuichi Tanikawa	16,450	11.96	12,036	8.74
Sanseito	Takumi Miyauchi	16,129	11.73	12,603	9.15
Nippon Ishin no Kai				6,932	5.03
Team Mirai				6,747	4.90
Reiwa Shinsengumi				4,228	3.07
Japanese Communist Party				3,206	2.33
Conservative Party of Japan				2,828	2.05
Tax Cuts Japan and Yukoku Alliance				1,565	1.14
Social Democratic Party				1,172	0.85
Total		137,549	100.00	137,760	100.00
Invalid/blank votes					
Voter turnout			47.66		
Registered voters		293,406		293,406	
LDP hold					

Ibaraki 3rd district
Party	Candidate	Constituency		Proportional	
Party	Candidate	Votes	%	Votes	%
Liberal Democratic Party	Yasuhiro Hanashi	103,231	51.29	77,102	37.77
Centrist Reform Alliance	Hiroki Kajioka	56,143	27.90	42,028	20.59
Sanseito	Mai Saito	31,880	15.84	17,976	8.81
Democratic Party For the People				16,869	8.26
Team Mirai				15,148	7.42
Nippon Ishin no Kai				11,535	5.65
Japanese Communist Party				7,467	3.66
Reiwa Shinsengumi	Yumi Kagawa	10,008	4.97	6,404	3.14
Conservative Party of Japan				4,788	2.35
Tax Cuts Japan and Yukoku Alliance				2,596	1.27
Social Democratic Party				2,230	1.09
Total		201,262	100.00	204,143	100.00
Invalid/blank votes					
Voter turnout			53.76		
Registered voters		384,038		384,038	
LDP hold					

Ibaraki 4th district
Party	Candidate	Constituency		Proportional	
Party	Candidate	Votes	%	Votes	%
Liberal Democratic Party	Hiroshi Kajiyama	106,286	83.10	56,002	42.18
Centrist Reform Alliance				24,450	18.41
Democratic Party For the People				13,156	9.91
Sanseito				9,720	7.32
Team Mirai				8,266	6.23
Nippon Ishin no Kai				7,983	6.01
Japanese Communist Party	Tsubasa Yoshida	21,610	16.90	4,158	3.13
Reiwa Shinsengumi				3,502	2.64
Conservative Party of Japan				2,606	1.96
Social Democratic Party				1,606	1.21
Tax Cuts Japan and Yukoku Alliance				1,325	1.00
Total		127,896	100.00	132,774	100.00
Invalid/blank votes					
Voter turnout			51.88		
Registered voters		260,198		260,198	
LDP hold					

Ibaraki 5th district
Party	Candidate	Constituency		Proportional	
Party	Candidate	Votes	%	Votes	%
Democratic Party For the People	Satoshi Asano	70,438	60.42	21,455	17.94
Liberal Democratic Party	Takumi Suzuki	46,141	39.58	46,187	38.61
Centrist Reform Alliance				23,348	19.52
Sanseito				7,000	5.85
Team Mirai				6,448	5.39
Nippon Ishin no Kai				5,008	4.19
Reiwa Shinsengumi				2,978	2.49
Japanese Communist Party				2,878	2.41
Conservative Party of Japan				1,985	1.66
Social Democratic Party				1,272	1.06
Tax Cuts Japan and Yukoku Alliance				1,056	0.88
Total		116,579	100.00	119,615	100.00
Invalid/blank votes					
Voter turnout			52.96		
Registered voters		229,095		229,095	
DPFP hold					

Ibaraki 6th district
Party	Candidate	Constituency		Proportional	
Party	Candidate	Votes	%	Votes	%
Liberal Democratic Party	Ayano Kunimitsu	107,388	43.20	99,968	39.99
Independent	Yamato Aoyama	104,844	42.18		
Centrist Reform Alliance				40,603	16.24
Democratic Party For the People				24,669	9.87
Sanseito	Maki Horikoshi	23,443	9.43	21,250	8.50
Team Mirai				21,026	8.41
Nippon Ishin no Kai				13,890	5.56
Japanese Communist Party	Hideki Inaba	9,902	3.98	9,568	3.83
Reiwa Shinsengumi				7,106	2.84
Conservative Party of Japan				5,985	2.39
Social Democratic Party				3,005	1.20
Independent	Kichio Nakamura	2,982	1.20		
Tax Cuts Japan and Yukoku Alliance				2,899	1.16
Total		248,559	100.00	249,969	100.00
Invalid/blank votes					
Voter turnout			55.92		
Registered voters		454,571		454,571	
LDP gain from Independent					

Ibaraki 7th district
Party	Candidate	Constituency		Proportional	
Party	Candidate	Votes	%	Votes	%
Independent	Hayato Nakamura	84,930	52.55		
Liberal Democratic Party	Keiko Nagaoka	76,700	47.45	70,898	43.72
Centrist Reform Alliance				29,617	18.26
Sanseito				14,047	8.66
Democratic Party For the People				13,093	8.07
Nippon Ishin no Kai				8,939	5.51
Team Mirai				8,411	5.19
Reiwa Shinsengumi				5,579	3.44
Japanese Communist Party				4,823	2.97
Conservative Party of Japan				3,479	2.15
Tax Cuts Japan and Yukoku Alliance				1,671	1.03
Social Democratic Party				1,623	1.00
Total		161,630	100.00	162,180	100.00
Invalid/blank votes					
Voter turnout			52.50		
Registered voters		318,124		318,124	
Independent hold					

=== Tochigi Prefecture ===
Tochigi Prefecture
Party	Constituency			Proportional	
Party	Votes	%	Seats	Votes	%
Liberal Democratic Party	404,341	49.26	4	336,827	40.90
Centrist Reform Alliance	185,448	22.59	0	155,029	18.83
Democratic Party For the People	19,626	2.39	0	78,988	9.59
Sanseito	83,645	10.19	0	70,006	8.50
Team Mirai				50,813	6.17
Nippon Ishin no Kai	41,233	5.02	0	44,569	5.41
Reiwa Shinsengumi				26,229	3.19
Japanese Communist Party	21,767	2.65	0	22,434	2.72
Conservative Party of Japan				17,282	2.10
Social Democratic Party				11,146	1.35
Tax Cuts Japan and Yukoku Alliance				10,180	1.24
Independents	64,760	7.89	1		
Total	820,820	100.00	5	823,503	100.00
Invalid/blank votes					
Voter turnout					
Registered voters					

Tochigi 1st district
Party	Candidate	Constituency		Proportional	
Party	Candidate	Votes	%	Votes	%
Liberal Democratic Party	Hajime Funada	85,199	40.52	79,426	37.52
Centrist Reform Alliance	Atsushi Koike	45,243	21.52	36,978	17.47
Democratic Party For the People				21,723	10.26
Nippon Ishin no Kai	Yuji Kashiwakura	41,233	19.61	17,875	8.44
Sanseito	Noriaki Omori	29,337	13.95	18,087	8.54
Team Mirai				15,879	7.50
Reiwa Shinsengumi				6,108	2.89
Japanese Communist Party	Hiroshi Aoki	6,452	3.07	5,537	2.62
Conservative Party of Japan				4,892	2.31
Independent	Bunzaburo Ishikawa	2,821	1.34		
Tax Cuts Japan and Yukoku Alliance				2,681	1.27
Social Democratic Party				2,520	1.19
Total		210,285	100.00	211,706	100.00
Invalid/blank votes					
Voter turnout			51.60		
Registered voters		415,679		415,679	
LDP hold					

Tochigi 2nd district
Party	Candidate	Constituency		Proportional	
Party	Candidate	Votes	%	Votes	%
Liberal Democratic Party	Kiyoshi Igarashi	66,681	51.84	54,468	42.36
Centrist Reform Alliance	Akio Fukuda	45,129	35.08	26,376	20.51
Democratic Party For the People				11,415	8.88
Sanseito	Kumi Fujita	16,827	13.08	11,118	8.65
Team Mirai				7,187	5.59
Nippon Ishin no Kai				5,536	4.31
Reiwa Shinsengumi				3,835	2.98
Japanese Communist Party				3,042	2.37
Conservative Party of Japan				2,348	1.83
Social Democratic Party				1,820	1.42
Tax Cuts Japan and Yukoku Alliance				1,449	1.13
Total		128,637	100.00	128,594	100.00
Invalid/blank votes					
Voter turnout			52.94		
Registered voters		247,819		247,819	
LDP gain from CRA					

Tochigi 3rd district
Party	Candidate	Constituency		Proportional	
Party	Candidate	Votes	%	Votes	%
Independent	Shintaro Watanabe	58,483	43.95		
Liberal Democratic Party	Kazuo Yana	53,975	40.56	57,049	43.68
Centrist Reform Alliance	Hiroshi Iga	20,611	15.49	24,112	18.46
Democratic Party For the People				11,465	8.78
Sanseito				10,328	7.91
Team Mirai				7,222	5.53
Nippon Ishin no Kai				5,968	4.57
Reiwa Shinsengumi				4,874	3.73
Japanese Communist Party				3,613	2.77
Conservative Party of Japan				2,352	1.80
Social Democratic Party				1,945	1.49
Tax Cuts Japan and Yukoku Alliance				1,693	1.30
Total		133,069	100.00	130,621	100.00
Invalid/blank votes					
Voter turnout			58.15		
Registered voters		232,241		232,241	
Independent gain from LDP					

Tochigi 4th district
Party	Candidate	Constituency		Proportional	
Party	Candidate	Votes	%	Votes	%
Liberal Democratic Party	Masaru Ishizaka	87,743	47.06	78,087	41.73
Centrist Reform Alliance	Takao Fujioka	74,465	39.94	39,007	20.85
Democratic Party For the People				17,349	9.27
Sanseito	Tomoko Noguchi	20,768	11.14	15,296	8.18
Team Mirai				10,906	5.83
Nippon Ishin no Kai				7,719	4.13
Reiwa Shinsengumi				5,642	3.02
Japanese Communist Party				4,375	2.34
Conservative Party of Japan				3,981	2.13
Independent	Manabu Onuki	3,456	1.85		
Social Democratic Party				2,450	1.31
Tax Cuts Japan and Yukoku Alliance				2,295	1.23
Total		186,432	100.00	187,107	100.00
Invalid/blank votes					
Voter turnout			54.24		
Registered voters		350,584		350,584	
LDP gain from CRA					

Tochigi 5th district
Party	Candidate	Constituency		Proportional	
Party	Candidate	Votes	%	Votes	%
Liberal Democratic Party	Toshimitsu Motegi	110,743	68.19	67,797	40.97
Centrist Reform Alliance				28,556	17.26
Democratic Party For the People	Takafumi Terada	19,626	12.09	17,036	10.30
Sanseito	Yosuke Miyamoto	16,713	10.29	15,177	9.17
Team Mirai				9,619	5.81
Nippon Ishin no Kai				7,471	4.51
Japanese Communist Party	Keiko Okamura	15,315	9.43	5,867	3.55
Reiwa Shinsengumi				5,770	3.49
Conservative Party of Japan				3,709	2.24
Social Democratic Party				2,411	1.46
Tax Cuts Japan and Yukoku Alliance				2,062	1.25
Total		162,397	100.00	165,475	100.00
Invalid/blank votes					
Voter turnout			49.92		
Registered voters		337,159		337,159	
LDP hold					

=== Gunma Prefecture ===
Gunma Prefecture
Party	Constituency			Proportional	
Party	Votes	%	Seats	Votes	%
Liberal Democratic Party	476,060	59.56	5	316,716	38.51
Centrist Reform Alliance	137,155	17.16	0	153,578	18.68
Sanseito	101,134	12.65	0	84,065	10.22
Democratic Party For the People	22,227	2.78	0	72,305	8.79
Team Mirai				56,627	6.89
Nippon Ishin no Kai				37,518	4.56
Japanese Communist Party	35,772	4.48	0	35,707	4.34
Reiwa Shinsengumi				25,282	3.07
Conservative Party of Japan	7,471	0.93	0	20,179	2.45
Tax Cuts Japan and Yukoku Alliance				10,207	1.24
Social Democratic Party				10,148	1.23
Independents	19,435	2.43	0		
Total	799,254	100.00	5	822,332	100.00
Invalid/blank votes					
Voter turnout					
Registered voters					

Gunma 1st district
Party	Candidate	Constituency		Proportional	
Party	Candidate	Votes	%	Votes	%
Liberal Democratic Party	Yasutaka Nakasone	103,316	61.64	64,881	37.69
Centrist Reform Alliance	Masatake Kawamura	48,324	28.83	33,989	19.74
Sanseito				15,345	8.91
Democratic Party For the People				14,037	8.15
Team Mirai				13,129	7.63
Japanese Communist Party	Setsuko Tanahashi	15,962	9.52	9,123	5.30
Nippon Ishin no Kai				8,196	4.76
Reiwa Shinsengumi				5,278	3.07
Conservative Party of Japan				3,871	2.25
Tax Cuts Japan and Yukoku Alliance				2,207	1.28
Social Democratic Party				2,107	1.22
Total		167,602	100.00	172,163	100.00
Invalid/blank votes					
Voter turnout			52.24		
Registered voters		334,671		334,671	
LDP hold					

Gunma 2nd district
Party	Candidate	Constituency		Proportional	
Party	Candidate	Votes	%	Votes	%
Liberal Democratic Party	Toshiro Ino	84,167	52.74	62,351	38.34
Centrist Reform Alliance				27,692	17.03
Independent	Takashi Ishizeki	19,435	12.18		
Democratic Party For the People	Kazutaka Hara	22,227	13.93	16,917	10.40
Sanseito	Sonoko Kumaido	16,041	10.05	16,726	10.28
Team Mirai				10,704	6.58
Nippon Ishin no Kai				7,185	4.42
Japanese Communist Party	Tamotsu Takahashi	10,254	6.43	6,994	4.30
Conservative Party of Japan	Junko Ito	7,471	4.68	5,281	3.25
Reiwa Shinsengumi				5,110	3.14
Tax Cuts Japan and Yukoku Alliance				2,005	1.23
Social Democratic Party				1,664	1.02
Total		159,595	100.00	162,629	100.00
Invalid/blank votes					
Voter turnout			51.18		
Registered voters		322,196		322,196	
LDP hold					

Gunma 3rd district
Party	Candidate	Constituency		Proportional	
Party	Candidate	Votes	%	Votes	%
Liberal Democratic Party	Hiroyoshi Sasagawa	96,283	61.53	61,616	38.28
Centrist Reform Alliance	Kaichi Hasegawa	60,204	38.47	34,914	21.69
Sanseito				14,972	9.30
Democratic Party For the People				14,412	8.95
Team Mirai				10,028	6.23
Nippon Ishin no Kai				7,106	4.41
Reiwa Shinsengumi				5,093	3.16
Japanese Communist Party				5,072	3.15
Conservative Party of Japan				3,904	2.43
Tax Cuts Japan and Yukoku Alliance				1,978	1.23
Social Democratic Party				1,874	1.16
Total		156,487	100.00	160,969	100.00
Invalid/blank votes					
Voter turnout			52.23		
Registered voters		312,789		312,789	
LDP hold					

Gunma 4th district
Party	Candidate	Constituency		Proportional	
Party	Candidate	Votes	%	Votes	%
Liberal Democratic Party	Tatsuo Fukuda	84,938	53.41	59,979	37.34
Sanseito	Hitomi Aoki	35,906	22.58	18,268	11.37
Centrist Reform Alliance	Hiroki Yamada	28,627	18.00	28,464	17.72
Democratic Party For the People				14,043	8.74
Team Mirai				12,481	7.77
Nippon Ishin no Kai				7,488	4.66
Japanese Communist Party	Tatsuya Ito	9,556	6.01	7,463	4.65
Reiwa Shinsengumi				4,719	2.94
Conservative Party of Japan				3,801	2.37
Tax Cuts Japan and Yukoku Alliance				2,040	1.27
Social Democratic Party				1,903	1.18
Total		159,027	100.00	160,649	100.00
Invalid/blank votes					
Voter turnout			56.25		
Registered voters		289,300		289,300	
LDP hold					

Gunma 5th district
Party	Candidate	Constituency		Proportional	
Party	Candidate	Votes	%	Votes	%
Liberal Democratic Party	Yūko Obuchi	107,356	68.58	67,889	40.92
Centrist Reform Alliance				28,519	17.19
Sanseito	Tomoki Kogure	49,187	31.42	18,754	11.30
Democratic Party For the People				12,896	7.77
Team Mirai				10,285	6.20
Nippon Ishin no Kai				7,543	4.55
Japanese Communist Party				7,055	4.25
Reiwa Shinsengumi				5,082	3.06
Conservative Party of Japan				3,322	2.00
Social Democratic Party				2,600	1.57
Tax Cuts Japan and Yukoku Alliance				1,977	1.19
Total		156,543	100.00	165,922	100.00
Invalid/blank votes					
Voter turnout			55.41		
Registered voters		305,988		305,988	
LDP hold					

=== Saitama Prefecture ===
Saitama Prefecture
Party	Constituency			Proportional	
Party	Votes	%	Seats	Votes	%
Liberal Democratic Party	1,589,757	50.42	16	1,106,746	34.24
Centrist Reform Alliance	853,030	27.05	0	640,420	19.81
Democratic Party For the People	261,127	8.28	0	355,503	11.00
Team Mirai				280,826	8.69
Sanseito	185,301	5.88	0	250,379	7.75
Nippon Ishin no Kai	89,211	2.83	0	178,248	5.51
Japanese Communist Party	95,834	3.04	0	155,969	4.83
Reiwa Shinsengumi	16,713	0.53	0	94,830	2.93
Conservative Party of Japan				87,292	2.70
Social Democratic Party				42,537	1.32
Tax Cuts Japan and Yukoku Alliance				39,352	1.22
Independents	47,043	1.49	0		
Others	15,213	0.48	0		
Total	3,153,229	100.00	16	3,232,102	100.00
Invalid/blank votes					
Voter turnout					
Registered voters					

Saitama 1st district
Party	Candidate	Constituency		Proportional	
Party	Candidate	Votes	%	Votes	%
Liberal Democratic Party	Hideki Murai	121,002	55.65	73,956	33.65
Centrist Reform Alliance	Koichi Takemasa	67,980	31.27	41,817	19.03
Team Mirai				24,515	11.15
Democratic Party For the People				24,287	11.05
Sanseito	Shiro Sugamata	21,329	9.81	15,786	7.18
Nippon Ishin no Kai				11,853	5.39
Japanese Communist Party				10,286	4.68
Independent	Kazuki Haneda	7,115	3.27		
Conservative Party of Japan				6,201	2.82
Reiwa Shinsengumi				5,551	2.53
Social Democratic Party				2,835	1.29
Tax Cuts Japan and Yukoku Alliance				2,694	1.23
Total		217,426	100.00	219,781	100.00
Invalid/blank votes					
Voter turnout			57.30		
Registered voters		387,337		387,337	
LDP hold					

Saitama 2nd district
Party	Candidate	Constituency		Proportional	
Party	Candidate	Votes	%	Votes	%
Liberal Democratic Party	Yoshitaka Shindō	75,209	41.78	57,900	30.71
Centrist Reform Alliance				31,207	16.55
Democratic Party For the People	Hayato Hosoya	45,521	25.29	21,015	11.15
Sanseito	Shizuka Kanno	31,075	17.26	19,913	10.56
Team Mirai				18,081	9.59
Nippon Ishin no Kai	Hideaki Takahashi	28,187	15.66	15,467	8.20
Japanese Communist Party				8,577	4.55
Conservative Party of Japan				6,898	3.66
Reiwa Shinsengumi				5,193	2.75
Tax Cuts Japan and Yukoku Alliance				2,271	1.20
Social Democratic Party				2,006	1.06
Total		179,992	100.00	188,528	100.00
Invalid/blank votes					
Voter turnout			49.40		
Registered voters		385,497		385,497	
LDP hold					

Saitama 3rd district
Party	Candidate	Constituency		Proportional	
Party	Candidate	Votes	%	Votes	%
Liberal Democratic Party	Hitoshi Kikawada	96,335	52.20	63,511	33.87
Centrist Reform Alliance	Chiharu Takeuchi	60,430	32.74	37,814	20.17
Democratic Party For the People				19,394	10.34
Sanseito	Naoko Nakamura	27,801	15.06	16,634	8.87
Team Mirai				16,196	8.64
Nippon Ishin no Kai				10,476	5.59
Japanese Communist Party				8,031	4.28
Conservative Party of Japan				5,590	2.98
Reiwa Shinsengumi				5,351	2.85
Tax Cuts Japan and Yukoku Alliance				2,290	1.22
Social Democratic Party				2,223	1.19
Total		184,566	100.00	187,510	100.00
Invalid/blank votes					
Voter turnout			49.93		
Registered voters		379,284		379,284	
LDP hold					

Saitama 4th district
Party	Candidate	Constituency		Proportional	
Party	Candidate	Votes	%	Votes	%
Liberal Democratic Party	Yasushi Hosaka	110,312	52.92	71,598	33.21
Centrist Reform Alliance				34,969	16.22
Democratic Party For the People	Mitsuhiro Kishida	56,582	27.14	28,719	13.32
Team Mirai				22,474	10.42
Sanseito				15,830	7.34
Japanese Communist Party	Kaoru Kudo	25,501	12.23	11,088	5.14
Nippon Ishin no Kai	Michiko Iseda	16,072	7.71	13,964	6.48
Conservative Party of Japan				6,166	2.86
Reiwa Shinsengumi				5,756	2.67
Social Democratic Party				2,574	1.19
Tax Cuts Japan and Yukoku Alliance				2,469	1.15
Total		208,467	100.00	215,607	100.00
Invalid/blank votes					
Voter turnout			55.89		
Registered voters		389,557		389,557	
LDP hold					

Saitama 5th district
Party	Candidate	Constituency		Proportional	
Party	Candidate	Votes	%	Votes	%
Liberal Democratic Party	Yutaka Ihara	104,836	47.35	77,123	34.54
Centrist Reform Alliance	Yukio Edano	90,795	41.01	44,290	19.84
Democratic Party For the People				24,981	11.19
Team Mirai				23,615	10.58
Sanseito	Keisuke Iizuka	25,775	11.64	16,567	7.42
Nippon Ishin no Kai				10,797	4.84
Japanese Communist Party				8,945	4.01
Conservative Party of Japan				6,215	2.78
Reiwa Shinsengumi				5,237	2.35
Social Democratic Party				2,804	1.26
Tax Cuts Japan and Yukoku Alliance				2,712	1.21
Total		221,406	100.00	223,286	100.00
Invalid/blank votes					
Voter turnout			56.58		
Registered voters		398,784		398,784	
LDP gain from CRA					

Saitama 6th district
Party	Candidate	Constituency		Proportional	
Party	Candidate	Votes	%	Votes	%
Liberal Democratic Party	Akihito Obana	91,049	40.98	76,312	34.20
Centrist Reform Alliance	Atsushi Oshima	81,509	36.69	48,917	21.92
Democratic Party For the People				22,004	9.86
Team Mirai				17,787	7.97
Sanseito	Yoshiko Nagashima	21,078	9.49	16,845	7.55
Japanese Communist Party	Moe Akiyama	15,561	7.00	11,920	5.34
Nippon Ishin no Kai	Masanori Tsuda	12,958	5.83	12,212	5.47
Reiwa Shinsengumi				6,091	2.73
Conservative Party of Japan				5,383	2.41
Social Democratic Party				3,147	1.41
Tax Cuts Japan and Yukoku Alliance				2,537	1.14
Total		222,155	100.00	223,155	100.00
Invalid/blank votes					
Voter turnout			54.78		
Registered voters		411,950		411,950	
LDP gain from CRA					

Saitama 7th district
Party	Candidate	Constituency		Proportional	
Party	Candidate	Votes	%	Votes	%
Liberal Democratic Party	Hideyuki Nakano	107,470	57.19	64,972	33.13
Centrist Reform Alliance	Yasuko Komiyama	80,433	42.81	40,250	20.52
Democratic Party For the People				20,923	10.67
Team Mirai				16,965	8.65
Sanseito				15,244	7.77
Nippon Ishin no Kai				11,102	5.66
Japanese Communist Party				10,186	5.19
Reiwa Shinsengumi				5,792	2.95
Conservative Party of Japan				5,320	2.71
Social Democratic Party				2,840	1.45
Tax Cuts Japan and Yukoku Alliance				2,517	1.28
Total		187,903	100.00	196,111	100.00
Invalid/blank votes					
Voter turnout			51.31		
Registered voters		387,020		387,020	
LDP gain from CRA					

Saitama 8th district
Party	Candidate	Constituency		Proportional	
Party	Candidate	Votes	%	Votes	%
Liberal Democratic Party	Masahiko Shibayama	118,529	52.38	76,872	33.36
Centrist Reform Alliance	Tomoko Ichiki	67,825	29.97	45,614	19.80
Independent	Shizuka Okada	39,928	17.65		
Democratic Party For the People				24,098	10.46
Team Mirai				22,642	9.83
Sanseito				15,997	6.94
Japanese Communist Party				13,569	5.89
Nippon Ishin no Kai				12,279	5.33
Reiwa Shinsengumi				6,806	2.95
Conservative Party of Japan				6,404	2.78
Social Democratic Party				3,304	1.43
Tax Cuts Japan and Yukoku Alliance				2,818	1.22
Total		226,282	100.00	230,403	100.00
Invalid/blank votes					
Voter turnout			55.94		
Registered voters		416,073		416,073	
LDP hold					

Saitama 9th district
Party	Candidate	Constituency		Proportional	
Party	Candidate	Votes	%	Votes	%
Liberal Democratic Party	Taku Otsuka	112,062	54.97	73,506	34.62
Centrist Reform Alliance	Shinji Sugimura	91,805	45.03	48,400	22.80
Democratic Party For the People				19,665	9.26
Sanseito				16,011	7.54
Team Mirai				15,680	7.39
Japanese Communist Party				11,075	5.22
Nippon Ishin no Kai				10,442	4.92
Reiwa Shinsengumi				6,740	3.17
Conservative Party of Japan				5,082	2.39
Social Democratic Party				2,992	1.41
Tax Cuts Japan and Yukoku Alliance				2,713	1.28
Total		203,867	100.00	212,306	100.00
Invalid/blank votes					
Voter turnout			54.24		
Registered voters		396,162		396,162	
LDP gain from CRA					

Saitama 10th district
Party	Candidate	Constituency		Proportional	
Party	Candidate	Votes	%	Votes	%
Liberal Democratic Party	Susumu Yamaguchi	95,847	55.30	65,399	36.51
Centrist Reform Alliance	Yūnosuke Sakamoto	77,485	44.70	40,039	22.35
Democratic Party For the People				16,548	9.24
Sanseito				12,955	7.23
Team Mirai				11,850	6.61
Japanese Communist Party				8,646	4.83
Nippon Ishin no Kai				8,617	4.81
Reiwa Shinsengumi				5,852	3.27
Conservative Party of Japan				3,989	2.23
Social Democratic Party				3,012	1.68
Tax Cuts Japan and Yukoku Alliance				2,235	1.25
Total		173,332	100.00	179,142	100.00
Invalid/blank votes					
Voter turnout			56.41		
Registered voters		322,504		322,504	
LDP gain from CRA					

Saitama 11th district
Party	Candidate	Constituency		Proportional	
Party	Candidate	Votes	%	Votes	%
Liberal Democratic Party	Ryuji Koizumi	88,744	53.36	62,741	37.50
Centrist Reform Alliance	Makoto Shimada	32,508	19.54	32,912	19.67
Democratic Party For the People	Takahito Fuse	19,174	11.53	17,154	10.25
Sanseito	Takashi Kai	16,744	10.07	13,841	8.27
Team Mirai				10,594	6.33
Japanese Communist Party	Haruki Kakinuma	9,156	5.50	8,538	5.10
Nippon Ishin no Kai				7,630	4.56
Reiwa Shinsengumi				5,260	3.14
Conservative Party of Japan				3,742	2.24
Social Democratic Party				2,584	1.54
Tax Cuts Japan and Yukoku Alliance				2,325	1.39
Total		166,326	100.00	167,321	100.00
Invalid/blank votes					
Voter turnout			51.35		
Registered voters		330,721		330,721	
LDP hold					

Saitama 12th district
Party	Candidate	Constituency		Proportional	
Party	Candidate	Votes	%	Votes	%
Liberal Democratic Party	Atsushi Nonaka	102,382	55.80	71,561	38.33
Centrist Reform Alliance	Toshikazu Morita	81,103	44.20	43,264	23.18
Democratic Party For the People				16,891	9.05
Sanseito				13,247	7.10
Team Mirai				11,887	6.37
Nippon Ishin no Kai				8,185	4.38
Japanese Communist Party				5,487	3.78
Reiwa Shinsengumi				5,487	2.94
Conservative Party of Japan				4,376	2.34
Social Democratic Party				2,459	1.32
Tax Cuts Japan and Yukoku Alliance				2,254	1.21
Total		183,485	100.00	186,676	100.00
Invalid/blank votes					
Voter turnout			51.92		
Registered voters		364,453		364,453	
LDP gain from CRA					

Saitama 13th district
Party	Candidate	Constituency		Proportional	
Party	Candidate	Votes	%	Votes	%
Liberal Democratic Party	Hiromi Mitsubayashi	75,992	39.34	70,352	35.42
Centrist Reform Alliance				37,992	19.13
Democratic Party For the People	Mikihiko Hashimoto	69,464	35.96	26,654	13.42
Sanseito	Shizuo Sugiyama	17,675	9.15	14,397	7.25
Team Mirai				13,740	6.92
Reiwa Shinsengumi	Takashi Takai	16,713	8.65	8,795	4.43
Japanese Communist Party	Chieko Sawaguchi	13,305	6.89	8,900	4.48
Nippon Ishin no Kai				8,835	4.45
Conservative Party of Japan				4,182	2.11
Social Democratic Party				2,482	1.25
Tax Cuts Japan and Yukoku Alliance				2,287	1.15
Total		193,149	100.00	198,616	100.00
Invalid/blank votes					
Voter turnout			54.60		
Registered voters		367,637		367,637	
LDP gain from DPFP					

Saitama 14th district
Party	Candidate	Constituency		Proportional	
Party	Candidate	Votes	%	Votes	%
Liberal Democratic Party	Makoto Fujita	77,481	40.69	66,382	33.27
Centrist Reform Alliance				35,215	17.65
Democratic Party For the People	Yoshihiro Suzuki	70,386	36.96	29,625	14.85
Team Mirai				16,599	8.32
Sanseito	Yūko Amemiya	23,824	12.51	16,578	8.31
Nippon Ishin no Kai				10,068	5.05
Japanese Communist Party	Kyoko Naemura	18,732	9.84	9,409	4.72
Conservative Party of Japan				5,620	2.82
Reiwa Shinsengumi				5,537	2.78
Tax Cuts Japan and Yukoku Alliance				2,508	1.26
Social Democratic Party				1,965	0.98
Total		190,423	100.00	199,506	100.00
Invalid/blank votes					
Voter turnout			50.43		
Registered voters		399,376		399,376	
LDP gain from DPFP					

Saitama 15th district
Party	Candidate	Constituency		Proportional	
Party	Candidate	Votes	%	Votes	%
Liberal Democratic Party	Ryosei Tanaka	114,320	52.31	72,282	32.40
Centrist Reform Alliance	Tsuneko Oyamada	57,005	26.09	36,794	16.49
Democratic Party For the People				26,174	11.73
Team Mirai				25,068	11.24
Nippon Ishin no Kai	Tatsuki Nanbara	31,994	14.64	16,988	7.61
Sanseito				16,627	7.45
Other	Hiroaki Fujikawa	15,213	6.96		
Japanese Communist Party				10,659	4.78
Conservative Party of Japan				7,422	3.33
Reiwa Shinsengumi				5,936	2.66
Tax Cuts Japan and Yukoku Alliance				2,586	1.16
Social Democratic Party				2,576	1.15
Total		218,532	100.00	223,112	100.00
Invalid/blank votes					
Voter turnout			54.84		
Registered voters		410,816		410,816	
LDP hold					

Saitama 16th district
Party	Candidate	Constituency		Proportional	
Party	Candidate	Votes	%	Votes	%
Liberal Democratic Party	Shinako Tsuchiya	98,187	55.81	62,279	34.40
Centrist Reform Alliance	Sota Misumi	64,152	36.47	40,926	22.61
Democratic Party For the People				17,371	9.60
Sanseito				13,907	7.68
Team Mirai				13,133	7.25
Nippon Ishin no Kai				9,333	5.16
Japanese Communist Party	Ken Nagahori	13,579	7.72	9,075	5.01
Reiwa Shinsengumi				5,446	3.01
Conservative Party of Japan				4,702	2.60
Social Democratic Party				2,734	1.51
Tax Cuts Japan and Yukoku Alliance				2,136	1.18
Total		175,918	100.00	181,042	100.00
Invalid/blank votes					
Voter turnout			49.34		
Registered voters		371,147		371,147	
LDP hold					

== Proportional representation ==
Proportional representation results
Party	Votes	Seats	Rank	Elected member	Constituency	Ratio
LDP	2,256,845 (37.0%)	8	1	Kazuo Yana	Tochigi 3rd	92.2%
LDP	2,256,845 (37.0%)	8	1	Keiko Nagaoka	Ibaraki 7th	90.3%
LDP	2,256,845 (37.0%)	8	1	Takumi Suzuki	Ibaraki 5th	65.5%
LDP	2,256,845 (37.0%)	8	31	Kazuyuki Nakane		
LDP	2,256,845 (37.0%)	8	32	Masayoshi Saijo		
LDP	2,256,845 (37.0%)	8	33	Akimasa Ishikawa		
LDP	2,256,845 (37.0%)	8	34	Asako Omi		
LDP	2,256,845 (37.0%)	8	35	Megumi Maekawa		
CRA	1,174,717 (19.3%)	4	1	Keiichi Ishii		
CRA	1,174,717 (19.3%)	4	2	Keiichi Koshimizu		
CRA	1,174,717 (19.3%)	4	3	Takahiro Fukushige		
CRA	1,174,717 (19.3%)	4	4	Atsushi Oshima	Saitama 6th	89.5%
DPFP	626,695 (10.3%)	2	1	Mikihiko Hashimoto	Saitama 13th	91.4%
DPFP	626,695 (10.3%)	2	1	Yoshihiro Suzuki	Saitama 14th	90.8%
Sansei	506,071 (8.3%)	2	1	Mayuko Toyota		
Sansei	506,071 (8.3%)	2	2	Hitomi Aoki	Gunma 4th	42.2%
Mirai	467,561 (7.7%)	1	1	Kazuko Muto		
Ishin	326,128 (5.3%)	1	1	Yuji Kashiwakura	Tochigi 1st	48.3%
JCP	254,497 (4.2%)	1	1	Tetsuya Shiokawa		

Liberal Democratic Party 2,256,845 (37.02%) 8 seats
Rank	Candidate	Constituency	Ratio
1	Yoshinori Tadokoro	Ibaraki 1st	Won
1	Yasuhiro Hanashi	Ibaraki 3rd	Won
1	Hiroshi Kajiyama	Ibaraki 4th	Won
1	Ayano Kunimitsu	Ibaraki 6th	Won
1	Hajime Funada	Tochigi 1st	Won
1	Kiyoshi Igarashi	Tochigi 2nd	Won
1	Masaru Ishizaka	Tochigi 4th	Won
1	Toshimitsu Motegi	Tochigi 5th	Won
1	Yasutaka Nakasone	Gunma 1st	Won
1	Toshiro Ino	Gunma 2nd	Won
1	Hiroyoshi Sasagawa	Gunma 3rd	Won
1	Tatsuo Fukuda	Gunma 4th	Won
1	Yūko Obuchi	Gunma 5th	Won
1	Hideki Murai	Saitama 1st	Won
1	Yoshitaka Shindō	Saitama 2nd	Won
1	Hitoshi Kikawada	Saitama 3rd	Won
1	Yasushi Hosaka	Saitama 4th	Won
1	Yutaka Ihara	Saitama 5th	Won
1	Akihito Obana	Saitama 6th	Won
1	Hideyuki Nakano	Saitama 7th	Won
1	Masahiko Shibayama	Saitama 8th	Won
1	Taku Otsuka	Saitama 9th	Won
1	Susumu Yamaguchi	Saitama 10th	Won
1	Atsushi Nonaka	Saitama 12th	Won
1	Hiromi Mitsubayashi	Saitama 13th	Won
1	Makoto Fujita	Saitama 14th	Won
1	Ryosei Tanaka	Saitama 15th	Won
1	Kazuo Yana	Tochigi 3rd	92.2
1	Keiko Nagaoka	Ibaraki 7th	90.3
1	Takumi Suzuki	Ibaraki 5th	65.5
31	Kazuyuki Nakane		
32	Masayoshi Saijo		
33	Akimasa Ishikawa		
34	Asako Omi		
35	Megumi Maekawa		
36	Hiroki Tajima		
36	Hideko Tomiyama		
37	Masaru Masuda		

Centrist Reform Alliance 1,174,717 (19.27%) 4 seats
Rank	Candidate	Constituency	Ratio
1	Keiichi Ishii		
2	Keiichi Koshimizu		
3	Takahiro Fukushige		
4	Atsushi Oshima	Saitama 6th	89.5
4	Yukio Edano	Saitama 5th	86.6
4	Takao Fujioka	Tochigi 4th	84.8
4	Shinji Sugimura	Saitama 9th	81.9
4	Yūnosuke Sakamoto	Saitama 10th	80.8
4	Toshikazu Morita	Saitama 12th	79.2
4	Yasuko Komiyama	Saitama 7th	74.8
4	Akio Fukuda	Tochigi 2nd	67.6
4	Sota Misumi	Saitama 16th	65.3
4	Chiharu Takeuchi	Saitama 3rd	62.7
4	Kaichi Hasegawa	Gunma 3rd	62.5
4	Tomoko Ichiki	Saitama 8th	57.2
4	Koichi Takemasa	Saitama 1st	56.1
4	Hiroki Kajioka	Ibaraki 3rd	54.3
4	Atsushi Koike	Tochigi 1st	53.1
4	Tsuneko Oyamada	Saitama 15th	49.8
4	Masatake Kawamura	Gunma 1st	46.7
4	Takumi Onuma	Ibaraki 2nd	40.9
4	Makoto Shimada	Saitama 11th	36.6
4	Hiroshi Iga	Tochigi 3rd	35.2
4	Hiroki Yamada	Gunma 4th	33.7
25	Makoto Kimura		

Democratic Party For the People 626,695 (10.28%) 2 seats
Rank	Candidate	Constituency	Ratio
1	Satoshi Asano	Ibaraki 5th	Won
1	Mikihiko Hashimoto	Saitama 13th	91.4
1	Yoshihiro Suzuki	Saitama 14th	90.8
1	Hayato Hosoya	Saitama 2nd	60.5
1	Mitsuhiro Kishida	Saitama 4th	51.2
1	Kazutaka Hara	Gunma 2nd	26.4
1	Yūichi Tanikawa	Ibaraki 2nd	22.0
1	Takahito Fuse	Saitama 11th	21.6
1	Takafumi Terada	Tochigi 5th	17.7

Sanseito 506,071 (8.30%) 2 seats
Rank	Candidate	Constituency	Ratio
1	Mayuko Toyota		
2	Hitomi Aoki	Gunma 4th	42.2
2	Noriaki Omori	Tochigi 1st	34.4
2	Ayami Kawabata	Ibaraki 1st	28.9
5	Mai Saito	Ibaraki 3rd	30.8
5	~~Yoshiko Nagashima~~ (Note: Ineligible for election - failed to surpass the required 10% of votes in their single-member constituency race.)	Saitama 6th	23.2
5	~~Maki Horikoshi~~	Ibaraki 6th	21.8

Team Mirai 467,561 (7.67%) 1 seat
Rank	Candidate	Constituency	Ratio
1	Kazuko Muto		

Nippon Ishin no Kai 326,128 (5.35%) 1 seat
Rank	Candidate	Constituency	Ratio
1	Yuji Kashiwakura	Tochigi 1st	48.3
1	Hideaki Takahashi	Saitama 2nd	37.4
1	Tatsuki Nanbara	Saitama 15th	27.9
1	~~Michiko Iseda~~	Saitama 4th	14.6
1	~~Masanori Tsuda~~	Saitama 6th	14.2

Japanese Communist Party 254,497 (4.17%) 1 seat
Rank	Candidate	Constituency	Ratio
1	Tetsuya Shiokawa		
2	Saeko Umemura		

Reiwa Shinsengumi 182,261 (2.99%) 0 seats
Rank	Candidate	Constituency	Ratio
1	~~Takashi Takai~~	Saitama 13th	22.0
2	Mitsutoshi Yamagoshi		

Conservative Party of Japan 150,809 (2.47%) 0 seats
Rank	Candidate	Constituency	Ratio
1	~~Junko Ito~~	Gunma 2nd	8.9
2	Kazunori Goino		

Social Democratic Party 77,406 (1.27%) 0 seats
Rank	Candidate	Constituency	Ratio
1	Takanori Hoshi		

Tax Cuts Japan and Yukoku Alliance 73,111 (1.20%) 0 seats
Rank	Candidate	Constituency	Ratio
1	Toshiaki Koizumi		
