= Representatives elected in the 2024 Japanese general election =

This is a list of Representatives elected to the House of Representatives of Japan at the 2024 general election.

== Members ==
=== Hokkaido block ===
==== Constituency (12 seats) ====
Hokkaido
Constituency	Party	Elected Member
Hokkaido-1st	CDP	Daiki Michishita
Hokkaido-2nd	CDP	Kenko Matsuki
Hokkaido-3rd	CDP	Yutaka Arai
Hokkaido-4th	CDP	Kureha Otsuki
Hokkaido-5th	CDP	Maki Ikeda
Hokkaido-6th	LDP	Kuniyoshi Azuma
Hokkaido-7th	LDP	Takako Suzuki
Hokkaido-8th	CDP	Seiji Ōsaka
Hokkaido-9th	CDP	Tatsumaru Yamaoka
Hokkaido-10th	CDP	Hiroshi Kamiya
Hokkaido-11th	CDP	Kaori Ishikawa
Hokkaido-12th	LDP	Arata Takebe

==== Proportional Representation Seats (8 seats) ====
#	Party	Elected Member
1	CDP	Naoko Shinoda
2	LDP	Yoshitaka Itō
3	CDP	Masahito Nishikawa
4	LDP	Hiroyuki Nakamura
5	Komeito	Hidemichi Satō
6	CDP	Eisei Kawaharada
7	LDP	Jun Mukōyama
8	DPP	Hidetake Usuki

=== Tohoku block ===
==== Constituency (21 seats) ====
Aomori Prefecture
Constituency	Party	Elected Member
Aomori-1st	LDP	Jun Tsushima
Aomori-2nd	LDP	Junichi Kanda
Aomori-3rd	CDP	Hanako Okada
Iwate Prefecture
Constituency	Party	Elected Member
Iwate-1st	CDP	Takeshi Shina
Iwate-2nd	LDP	Shunichi Suzuki
Iwate-3rd	CDP	Ichirō Ozawa
Miyagi Prefecture
Constituency	Party	Elected Member
Miyagi-1st	CDP	Akiko Okamoto
Miyagi-2nd	CDP	Sayuri Kamata
Miyagi-3rd	CDP	Tsuyoshi Yanagisawa
Miyagi-4th	CDP	Jun Azumi
Miyagi-5th	LDP	Itsunori Onodera
Akita Prefecture
Constituency	Party	Elected Member
Akita-1st	LDP	Hiroyuki Togashi
Akita-2nd	CDP	Takashi Midorikawa
Akita-3rd	DPP	Toshihide Muraoka
Yamagata Prefecture
Constituency	Party	Elected Member
Yamagata-1st	LDP	Toshiaki Endo
Yamagata-2nd	LDP	Norikazu Suzuki
Yamagata-3rd	LDP	Ayuko Kato
Fukushima Prefecture
Constituency	Party	Elected Member
Fukushima-1st	CDP	Emi Kaneko
Fukushima-2nd	CDP	Kōichirō Genba
Fukushima-3rd	CDP	Shinji Oguma
Fukushima-4th	LDP	Ryutaro Sakamoto

==== Proportional Representation Seats (12 seats) ====
#	Party	Elected Member
1	LDP	Akinori Eto
2	CDP	Yuki Baba
3	LDP	Chisato Morishita
4	CDP	Manabu Terata
5	DPP	Daijiro Kikuchi
6	LDP	Junji Fukuhara
7	Komeito	Kenichi Shoji
8	CDP	Sekio Masuta
9	LDP	Nobuhide Minorikawa
10	Reiwa	Wakako Sawara
11	CDP	Yuki Saito
12	LDP	Taku Nemoto

=== Northern Kanto block ===
==== Constituency (33 seats) ====
Ibaraki Prefecture
Constituency	Party	Elected Member
Ibaraki-1st	Ind.	Nobuyuki Fukushima
Ibaraki-2nd	LDP	Fukushiro Nukaga
Ibaraki-3rd	LDP	Yasuhiro Hanashi
Ibaraki-4th	LDP	Hiroshi Kajiyama
Ibaraki-5th	DPP	Satoshi Asano
Ibaraki-6th	CDP	Yamato Aoyama
Ibaraki-7th	Ind.	Hayato Nakamura
Tochigi Prefecture
Constituency	Party	Elected Member
Tochigi-1st	LDP	Hajime Funada
Tochigi-2nd	CDP	Akio Fukuda
Tochigi-3rd	LDP	Kazuo Yana
Tochigi-4th	CDP	Takao Fujioka
Tochigi-5th	LDP	Toshimitsu Motegi
Gunma Prefecture
Constituency	Party	Elected Member
Gunma-1st	LDP	Yasutaka Nakasone
Gunma-2nd	LDP	Toshiro Ino
Gunma-3rd	LDP	Hiroyoshi Sasagawa
Gunma-4th	LDP	Tatsuo Fukuda
Gunma-5th	LDP	Yūko Obuchi
Saitama Prefecture
Constituency	Party	Elected Member
Saitama-1st	LDP	Hideki Murai
Saitama-2nd	LDP	Yoshitaka Shindō
Saitama-3rd	LDP	Hitoshi Kikawada
Saitama-4th	LDP	Yasushi Hosaka
Saitama-5th	CDP	Yukio Edano
Saitama-6th	CDP	Atsushi Oshima
Saitama-7th	CDP	Yasuko Komiyama
Saitama-8th	LDP	Masahiko Shibayama
Saitama-9th	CDP	Shinji Sugimura
Saitama-10th	CDP	Yūnosuke Sakamoto
Saitama-11th	LDP	Ryuji Koizumi
Saitama-12th	CDP	Toshikazu Morita
Saitama-13th	DPP	Mikihiko Hashimoto
Saitama-14th	DPP	Yoshihiro Suzuki
Saitama-15th	LDP	Ryosei Tanaka
Saitama-16th	LDP	Shinako Tsuchiya

==== Proportional Representation Seats (19 seats) ====
#	Party	Elected Member
1	LDP	Hideyuki Nakano
2	CDP	Kaichi Hasegawa
3	LDP	Ayano Kunimitsu
4	DPP	Mitsuhiro Kishida
5	Komeito	Keiichi Koshimizu
6	CDP	Koichi Takemasa
7	LDP	Keiko Nagaoka
8	CDP	Sota Misumi
9	Reiwa	Takashi Takai
10	LDP	Yoshinori Tadokoro
11	Ishin	Hideaki Takahashi
12	JCP	Tetsuya Shiokawa
13	Komeito	Takahiro Fukushige
14	CDP	Chiharu Takeuchi
15	LDP	Tsutomu Sato
16	LDP	Kiyoshi Igarashi
17	CDP	Tomoko Ichiki
18	LDP	Atsushi Nonaka
19	Komeito	Ryoji Yamaguchi

=== Southern Kanto block ===
==== Constituency (36 seats) ====
Chiba Prefecture
Constituency	Party	Elected Member
Chiba-1st	CDP	Kaname Tajima
Chiba-2nd	LDP	Takayuki Kobayashi
Chiba-3rd	LDP	Hirokazu Matsuno
Chiba-4th	CDP	Hideyuki Mizunuma
Chiba-5th	CDP	Kentaro Yazaki
Chiba-6th	CDP	Junko Andō
Chiba-7th	LDP	Ken Saitō
Chiba-8th	CDP	Satoshi Honjo
Chiba-9th	CDP	Soichiro Okuno
Chiba-10th	LDP	Masaaki Koike
Chiba-11th	LDP	Eisuke Mori
Chiba-12th	LDP	Yasukazu Hamada
Chiba-13th	LDP	Hisashi Matsumoto
Chiba-14th	CDP	Yoshihiko Noda
Kanagawa Prefecture
Constituency	Party	Elected Member
Kanagawa-1st	CDP	Go Shinohara
Kanagawa-2nd	LDP	Yoshihide Suga
Kanagawa-3rd	LDP	Kenji Nakanishi
Kanagawa-4th	CDP	Yuki Waseda
Kanagawa-5th	LDP	Manabu Sakai
Kanagawa-6th	CDP	Yoichiro Aoyagi
Kanagawa-7th	CDP	Kazuma Nakatani
Kanagawa-8th	CDP	Kenji Eda
Kanagawa-9th	CDP	Hirofumi Ryu
Kanagawa-10th	LDP	Kazunori Tanaka
Kanagawa-11th	LDP	Shinjiro Koizumi
Kanagawa-12th	CDP	Tomoko Abe
Kanagawa-13th	CDP	Hideshi Futori
Kanagawa-14th	LDP	Jiro Akama
Kanagawa-15th	LDP	Taro Kono
Kanagawa-16th	CDP	Yuichi Goto
Kanagawa-17th	LDP	Karen Makishima
Kanagawa-18th	CDP	Hajime Sono
Kanagawa-19th	LDP	Tsuyoshi Kusama
Kanagawa-20th	CDP	Sayuri Otsuka
Yamanashi Prefecture
Constituency	Party	Elected Member
Yamanashi-1st	CDP	Katsuhito Nakajima
Yamanashi-2nd	LDP	Noriko Horiuchi

==== Proportional Representation Seats (23 seats) ====
#	Party	Elected Member
1	LDP	Naoki Furukawa
2	CDP	Hajime Yatagawa
3	LDP	Shinichi Nakatani
4	DPP	Hesusu Fukasaku
5	CDP	Naomi Sasaki
6	Komeito	Hideo Tsunoda
7	LDP	Arfiya Eri
8	CDP	Shin Miyakawa
9	Ishin	Ryuna Kanemura
10	Reiwa	Ryo Tagaya
11	LDP	Keisuke Suzuki
12	DPP	Junko Okano
13	JCP	Kazuo Shii
14	CDP	Kazumasa Okajima
15	Komeito	Mitsuko Numazaki
16	LDP	Hidehiro Mitani
17	CDP	Yoshihiro Nagatomo
18	LDP	Tsuyoshi Hoshino
19	DPP	Yoshitaka Nishioka
20	CDP	Makoto Yamazaki
21	Ishin	Kenta Fujimaki
22	Sanseitō	Atsushi Suzuki
23	LDP	Daishiro Yamagiwa

=== Tokyo block ===
==== Constituency (30 seats) ====
Tokyo
Constituency	Party	Elected Member
Tokyo-1st	CDP	Banri Kaieda
Tokyo-2nd	LDP	Kiyoto Tsuji
Tokyo-3rd	LDP	Hirotaka Ishihara
Tokyo-4th	LDP	Masaaki Taira
Tokyo-5th	CDP	Yoshio Tezuka
Tokyo-6th	CDP	Takayuki Ochiai
Tokyo-7th	CDP	Akihiro Matsuo
Tokyo-8th	CDP	Harumi Yoshida
Tokyo-9th	CDP	Issei Yamagishi
Tokyo-10th	LDP	Hayato Suzuki
Tokyo-11th	CDP	Yukihiko Akutsu
Tokyo-12th	LDP	Kei Takagi
Tokyo-13th	LDP	Shin Tsuchida
Tokyo-14th	LDP	Midori Matsushima
Tokyo-15th	CDP	Natsumi Sakai
Tokyo-16th	LDP	Yōhei Onishi
Tokyo-17th	Ind.	Katsuei Hirasawa
Tokyo-18th	LDP	Kaoru Fukuda
Tokyo-19th	CDP	Yoshinori Suematsu
Tokyo-20th	LDP	Seiji Kihara
Tokyo-21st	CDP	Masako Ōkawara
Tokyo-22nd	CDP	Ikuo Yamahana
Tokyo-23rd	CDP	Shunsuke Ito
Tokyo-24th	Ind.	Koichi Hagiuda
Tokyo-25th	LDP	Shinji Inoue
Tokyo-26th	Ind.	Jin Matsubara
Tokyo-27th	CDP	Akira Nagatsuma
Tokyo-28th	CDP	Satoshi Takamatsu
Tokyo-29th	Komeito	Mitsunari Okamoto
Tokyo-30th	CDP	Eri Igarashi

==== Proportional Representation Seats (19 seats) ====
#	Party	Elected Member
1	LDP	Takao Andō
2	CDP	Yosuke Suzuki
3	DPP	Yoriko Madoka
4	LDP	Tatsuya Ito
5	CDP	Reiko Matsushita
6	Komeito	Koichi Kasai
7	Ishin	Tsukasa Abe
8	JCP	Tomoko Tamura
9	LDP	Yohei Matsumoto
10	DPP	Yosuke Mori
11	Reiwa	Mari Kushibuchi
12	CDP	Yoshifu Arita
13	LDP	Kōki Ozora
14	CDP	Yumiko Abe
15	DPP	Kiichiro Hatoyama
16	LDP	Akihisa Nagashima
17	Komeito	Eriko Omori
18	CDP	Katsuyuki Shibata
19	Ishin	Sachiko Inokuchi

=== Hokuriku-Shinetsu block ===
==== Constituency (18 seats) ====
Niigata Prefecture
Constituency	Party	Elected Member
Niigata-1st	CDP	Chinami Nishimura
Niigata-2nd	CDP	Makiko Kikuta
Niigata-3rd	CDP	Takahiro Kuroiwa
Niigata-4th	CDP	Ryuichi Yoneyama
Niigata-5th	CDP	Mamoru Umetani
Nagano Prefecture
Constituency	Party	Elected Member
Nagano-1st	CDP	Takashi Shinohara
Nagano-2nd	CDP	Mitsu Shimojo
Nagano-3rd	CDP	Takeshi Kozu
Nagano-4th	LDP	Shigeyuki Goto
Nagano-5th	LDP	Ichiro Miyashita
Toyama Prefecture
Constituency	Party	Elected Member
Toyama-1st	LDP	Hiroaki Tabata
Toyama-2nd	LDP	Eishun Ueda
Toyama-3rd	LDP	Keiichiro Tachibana
Ishikawa Prefecture
Constituency	Party	Elected Member
Ishikawa-1st	LDP	Takuo Komori
Ishikawa-2nd	LDP	Hajime Sasaki
Ishikawa-3rd	CDP	Kazuya Kondo
Fukui Prefecture
Constituency	Party	Elected Member
Fukui-1st	LDP	Tomomi Inada
Fukui-2nd	CDP	Hideyuki Tsuji

==== Proportional Representation Seats (10 seats) ====
#	Party	Elected Member
1	LDP	Isato Kunisada
2	CDP	Toshihiro Yama
3	LDP	Hiroaki Saito
4	CDP	Junta Fukuta
5	LDP	Yosei Ide
6	DPP	Kai Odake
7	CDP	Tsubasa Hatano
8	LDP	Shoji Nishida
9	Komeito	Hiromasa Nakagawa
10	Ishin	Takeshi Saiki

=== Tokai block ===
==== Constituency (33 seats) ====
Gifu Prefecture
Constituency	Party	Elected Member
Gifu-1st	LDP	Seiko Noda
Gifu-2nd	LDP	Yasufumi Tanahashi
Gifu-3rd	LDP	Yoji Muto
Gifu-4th	CDP	Masato Imai
Gifu-5th	LDP	Keiji Furuya
Shizuoka Prefecture
Constituency	Party	Elected Member
Shizuoka-1st	LDP	Yōko Kamikawa
Shizuoka-2nd	LDP	Tatsunori Ibayashi
Shizuoka-3rd	CDP	Nobuhiro Koyama
Shizuoka-4th	DPP	Ken Tanaka
Shizuoka-5th	LDP	Goshi Hosono
Shizuoka-6th	CDP	Shu Watanabe
Shizuoka-7th	LDP	Minoru Kiuchi
Shizuoka-8th	CDP	Kentaro Genma
Aichi Prefecture
Constituency	Party	Elected Member
Aichi-1st	CPJ	Takashi Kawamura
Aichi-2nd	DPP	Motohisa Furukawa
Aichi-3rd	CDP	Shoichi Kondo
Aichi-4th	CDP	Yoshio Maki
Aichi-5th	CDP	Atsushi Nishikawa
Aichi-6th	LDP	Hideki Niwa
Aichi-7th	DPP	Saria Hino
Aichi-8th	CDP	Yutaka Banno
Aichi-9th	CDP	Mitsunori Okamoto
Aichi-10th	CDP	Norimasa Fujiwara
Aichi-11th	DPP	Midori Tanno
Aichi-12th	CDP	Kazuhiko Shigetoku
Aichi-13th	CDP	Kensuke Onishi
Aichi-14th	LDP	Soichiro Imaeda
Aichi-15th	LDP	Yukinori Nemoto
Aichi-16th	DPP	Toru Fukuta
Mie Prefecture
Constituency	Party	Elected Member
Mie-1st	LDP	Norihisa Tamura
Mie-2nd	CDP	Kosuke Shimono
Mie-3rd	CDP	Katsuya Okada
Mie-4th	LDP	Eikei Suzuki

==== Proportional Representation Seats (21 seats) ====
#	Party	Elected Member
1	LDP	Shinji Wakamiya
2	CDP	Isao Matsuda
3	LDP	Yoichi Fukazawa
4	DPP	Akihiro Senda
5	CDP	Satoshi Mano
6	Komeito	Yasuhiro Nakagawa
7	LDP	Takaaki Katsumata
8	Reiwa	Naoto Sakaguchi
9	CDP	Rie Otake
10	LDP	Hideto Kawasaki
11	Ishin	Kazumi Sugimoto
12	CDP	Hideto Kawasaki
13	LDP	Yasumasa Nagasaka
14	JCP	Nobuko Motomura
15	Komeito	Katsuhide Nishizono
16	CDP	Chiho Koyama
17	LDP	Shozo Kudo
18	CPJ	Yūko Takegami
19	Reiwa	Hideaki Uemura
20	CDP	Wakako Fukumori
21	LDP	Tadahiko Ito

=== Kansai (Kinki) block ===
==== Constituency (45 seats) ====
Shiga Prefecture
Constituency	Party	Elected Member
Shiga-1st	Ishin	Alex Saito
Shiga-2nd	LDP	Kenichiro Ueno
Shiga-3rd	LDP	Nobuhide Takemura
Kyoto Prefecture
Constituency	Party	Elected Member
Kyoto-1st	LDP	Yasushi Katsume
Kyoto-2nd	Ishin	Seiji Maehara
Kyoto-3rd	CDP	Kenta Izumi
Kyoto-4th	Ind.	Keiro Kitagami
Kyoto-5th	LDP	Taro Honda
Kyoto-6th	CDP	Kazunori Yamanoi
Osaka Prefecture
Constituency	Party	Elected Member
Osaka-1st	Ishin	Hidetaka Inoue
Osaka-2nd	Ishin	Tadashi Morishima
Osaka-3rd	Ishin	Tōru Azuma
Osaka-4th	Ishin	Teruo Minobe
Osaka-5th	Ishin	Satoshi Umemura
Osaka-6th	Ishin	Kaoru Nishida
Osaka-7th	Ishin	Takemitsu Okushita
Osaka-8th	Ishin	Joji Uruma
Osaka-9th	Ishin	Kei Hagihara
Osaka-10th	Ishin	Taku Ikeshita
Osaka-11th	Ishin	Hiroshi Nakatsuka
Osaka-12th	Ishin	Fumitake Fujita
Osaka-13th	Ishin	Ryohei Iwatani
Osaka-14th	Ishin	Hitoshi Aoyagi
Osaka-15th	Ishin	Yasuto Urano
Osaka-16th	Ishin	Masaki Kuroda
Osaka-17th	Ishin	Nobuyuki Baba
Osaka-18th	Ishin	Takashi Endo
Osaka-19th	Ishin	Nobuhisa Ito
Hyōgo Prefecture
Constituency	Party	Elected Member
Hyōgo-1st	CDP	Nobuhiko Isaka
Hyōgo-2nd	Komeito	Kazuyoshi Akaba
Hyōgo-3rd	LDP	Yoshihiro Seki
Hyōgo-4th	LDP	Hisayuki Fujii
Hyōgo-5th	LDP	Koichi Tani
Hyōgo-6th	CDP	Shu Sakurai
Hyōgo-7th	LDP	Kenji Yamada
Hyōgo-8th	Komeito	Hiromasa Nakano
Hyōgo-9th	Ind.	Yasutoshi Nishimura
Hyōgo-10th	LDP	Kisaburo Tokai
Hyōgo-11th	LDP	Takeaki Matsumoto
Hyōgo-12th	LDP	Tsuyoshi Yamaguchi
Nara Prefecture
Constituency	Party	Elected Member
Nara-1st	CDP	Sumio Mabuchi
Nara-2nd	LDP	Sanae Takaichi
Nara-3rd	LDP	Taido Tanose
Wakayama Prefecture
Constituency	Party	Elected Member
Wakayama-1st	LDP	Daichi Yamamoto
Wakayama-2nd	Ind.	Hiroshige Sekō

==== Proportional Representation Seats (28 seats) ====
#	Party	Elected Member
1	Ishin	Yumi Hayashi
2	LDP	Hiroo Kotera
3	CDP	Hiroyuki Moriyama
4	Komeito	Yuzuru Takeuchi
5	Ishin	Kē Miki
6	LDP	Masatoshi Ishida
7	DPP	Koichi Mukoyama
8	Ishin	Junko Tokuyasu
9	JCP	Kotaro Tatsumi
10	CDP	Keigo Hashimoto
11	LDP	Toshitaka Ōoka
12	Reiwa	Akiko Oishi
13	Komeito	Tomoko Ukishima
14	Ishin	Kotaro Ikehata
15	LDP	Masaki Ogushi
16	CDP	Satoru Okada
17	Ishin	Koichiro Ichimura
18	LDP	Shigeki Kobayashi
19	DPP	Masaki Hiraiwa
20	Sanseitō	Yūko Kitano
21	Komeito	Yoko Wanibuchi
22	Ishin	Yuichiro Wada
23	JCP	Akiko Horikawa
24	CDP	Kanako Otsuji
25	LDP	Tomoaki Shimada
26	Ishin	Keishi Abe
27	CPJ	Yoichi Shimada
28	Reiwa	Ai Yahata

=== Chugoku block ===
==== Constituency (17 seats) ====
Tottori Prefecture
Constituency	Party	Elected Member
Tottori-1st	LDP	Shigeru Ishiba
Tottori-2nd	LDP	Ryosei Akazawa
Shimane Prefecture
Constituency	Party	Elected Member
Shimane-1st	CDP	Akiko Kamei
Shimane-2nd	LDP	Yasuhiro Takami
Okayama Prefecture
Constituency	Party	Elected Member
Okayama-1st	LDP	Ichiro Aisawa
Okayama-2nd	LDP	Takashi Yamashita
Okayama-3rd	LDP	Katsunobu Katō
Okayama-4th	CDP	Michiyoshi Yunoki
Hiroshima Prefecture
Constituency	Party	Elected Member
Hiroshima-1st	LDP	Fumio Kishida
Hiroshima-2nd	LDP	Hiroshi Hiraguchi
Hiroshima-3rd	Komeito	Tetsuo Saito
Hiroshima-4th	Ishin	Seiki Soramoto
Hiroshima-5th	CDP	Koji Sato
Hiroshima-6th	LDP	Fumiaki Kobayashi
Yamaguchi Prefecture
Constituency	Party	Elected Member
Yamaguchi-1st	LDP	Masahiro Kōmura
Yamaguchi-2nd	LDP	Nobuchiyo Kishi
Yamaguchi-3rd	LDP	Yoshimasa Hayashi

==== Proportional Representation Seats (10 seats) ====
#	Party	Elected Member
1	LDP	Masayoshi Shintani
2	CDP	Hideo Hiraoka
3	LDP	Shojiro Hiranuma
4	Komeito	Akira Hirabayashi
5	LDP	Rintaro Ishibashi
6	DPP	Gen Fukuda
7	CDP	Keisuke Tsumura
8	LDP	Shinji Yoshida
9	LDP	Minoru Terada
10	CDP	Katsuya Azuma

=== Shikoku block ===
==== Constituency (10 seats) ====
Tokushima Prefecture
Constituency	Party	Elected Member
Tokushima-1st	LDP	Hirobumi Niki
Tokushima-2nd	LDP	Shunichi Yamaguchi
Kagawa Prefecture
Constituency	Party	Elected Member
Kagawa-1st	CDP	Junya Ogawa
Kagawa-2nd	DPP	Yuichiro Tamaki
Kagawa-3rd	LDP	Keitaro Ohno
Ehime Prefecture
Constituency	Party	Elected Member
Ehime-1st	LDP	Akihisa Shiozaki
Ehime-2nd	CDP	Yoichi Shiraishi
Ehime-3rd	LDP	Junji Hasegawa
Kōchi Prefecture
Constituency	Party	Elected Member
Kōchi-1st	LDP	Gen Nakatani
Kōchi-2nd	LDP	Masanao Ozaki

==== Proportional Representation Seats (6 seats) ====
#	Party	Elected Member
1	LDP	Seiichiro Murakami
2	CDP	Ei Takahashi
3	LDP	Takuya Hirai
4	DPP	Tomoe Ishii
5	Komeito	Masayasu Yamasaki
6	LDP	Takakazu Seto

=== Kyushu block ===
==== Constituency (34 seats) ====
Fukuoka Prefecture
Constituency	Party	Elected Member
Fukuoka-1st	LDP	Takahiro Inoue
Fukuoka-2nd	CDP	Shuji Inatomi
Fukuoka-3rd	LDP	Atsushi Koga
Fukuoka-4th	LDP	Hideki Miyauchi
Fukuoka-5th	LDP	Wataru Kurihara
Fukuoka-6th	LDP	Jiro Hatoyama
Fukuoka-7th	LDP	Satoshi Fujimaru
Fukuoka-8th	LDP	Tarō Asō
Fukuoka-9th	Ind.	Rintaro Ogata
Fukuoka-10th	CDP	Takashi Kii
Fukuoka-11th	Ishin	Tomonobu Murakami
Saga Prefecture
Constituency	Party	Elected Member
Saga-1st	CDP	Kazuhiro Haraguchi
Saga-2nd	CDP	Hiroshi Ogushi
Nagasaki Prefecture
Constituency	Party	Elected Member
Nagasaki-1st	DPP	Hideko Nishioka
Nagasaki-2nd	LDP	Ryusho Kato
Nagasaki-3rd	LDP	Yozo Kaneko
Kumamoto Prefecture
Constituency	Party	Elected Member
Kumamoto-1st	LDP	Minoru Kihara
Kumamoto-2nd	LDP	Daisuke Nishino
Kumamoto-3rd	LDP	Tetsushi Sakamoto
Kumamoto-4th	LDP	Yasushi Kaneko
Ōita Prefecture
Constituency	Party	Elected Member
Ōita-1st	Ind.	Shuji Kira
Ōita-2nd	Ind.	Ken Hirose
Ōita-3rd	LDP	Takeshi Iwaya
Miyazaki Prefecture
Constituency	Party	Elected Member
Miyazaki-1st	CDP	Sō Watanabe
Miyazaki-2nd	LDP	Taku Etō
Miyazaki-3rd	LDP	Yoshihisa Furukawa
Kagoshima Prefecture
Constituency	Party	Elected Member
Kagoshima-1st	CDP	Hiroshi Kawauchi
Kagoshima-2nd	Ind.	Satoshi Mitazono
Kagoshima-3rd	CDP	Takeshi Noma
Kagoshima-4th	LDP	Hiroshi Moriyama
Okinawa Prefecture
Constituency	Party	Elected Member
Okinawa-1st	JCP	Seiken Akamine
Okinawa-2nd	SDP	Kunio Arakaki
Okinawa-3rd	LDP	Aiko Shimajiri
Okinawa-4th	LDP	Kozaburo Nishime

==== Proportional Representation Seats (20 seats) ====
#	Party	Elected Member
1	LDP	Toshiko Abe
2	CDP	Tomohiro Yara
3	Komeito	Masakazu Hamachi
4	LDP	Takuma Miyaji
5	CDP	Hajime Yoshikawa
6	DPP	Shinji Nagatomo
7	LDP	Makoto Oniki
8	Reiwa	Hitoshi Yamakawa
9	Komeito	Nobuhiro Yoshida
10	LDP	Konosuke Kokuba
11	CDP	Katsuhiko Yamada
12	Ishin	Hiroki Abe
13	LDP	Kazuchika Iwata
14	CDP	Kaname Tsutsumi
15	Komeito	Yasukuni Kinjo
16	DPP	Ryotaro Konomi
17	LDP	Yasushi Furukawa
18	Sanseitō	Rina Yoshikawa
19	JCP	Takaaki Tamura
20	LDP	Masahisa Miyazaki
