= Shintaro Watanabe =

Japanese politician

- 渡邉 真太朗

Member of the House of Representatives
- Incumbent
- Assumed office 9 February 2026
- Preceded by: Kazuo Yana
- Constituency: Tochigi 3rd

Personal details
- Born: 8 November 1992 (age 33) Nasukarasuyama, Tochigi, Japan
- Party: Independent (Note: Watanabe is registered as a member of the Liberal Democratic Party)
- Education: Gakushuin University
- Website: Shintaro Watanabe website

Shintaro Watanabe (渡邊 真太朗, Watanabe Shintaro; born 8 November 1992) is a Japanese politician, who serves as a member of the House of Representatives.

== Early years ==
On 8 November 1992, Watanabe was born in Nasukarasuyama, Tochigi. After graduating from Gakushuin University's Faculty of Economics, he joined Ashikaga Bank in 2016. In 2018, he resigned from the Ashikaga Bank and worked as a staff member at the supporters' association office for Tochigi Governor Tomikazu Fukuda until the end of 2021. He then entered the Matsushita Institute of Government and Management in 2022, graduating early on 20 September 2024.

== Political career ==
On 3 October 2024, Watanabe announced his candidacy for Tochigi 3rd district. In the 2024 general election, he lost to LDP incumbent Kazuo Yana by only 178 votes.

In the 2026 general election, Ōtawara mayor Kenichi Sōma, Nasukarasuyama mayor Junko Kawamata, and Nakagawa mayor Sumie Mashiko supported Watanabe, not Yana. As a result of election, he defeated LDP incumbent Yana.

In the 2026 Ōtawara mayoral election, he supported incumbent Sōma and Sōma defeated Tatsuo Hikichi, who was a former chair of the City Council and endorsed by LDP's Yana.

== Scandal ==
In January 2026, it was revealed that Yana's political activity posters displayed within Tochigi 3rd district had been removed without permission and replaced with those of Watanabe. Consequently, Yuho Shibui, a Nasukarasuyama City Council member who supported Watanabe, along with Watanabe's father, had been referred to the Utsunomiya District Public Prosecutors Office in December 2025 on suspicion of property damage. In response to an interview by Tochigi Television, Watanabe's office commented, "To ensure that such an incident never occurs again, we will strictly adhere to a policy of legal compliance."
