= Takashi Mitsubayashi =

Japanese politician

- 三ッ林 隆志
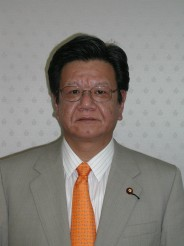
- Mitsubayashi in 2005

Member of the House of Representatives
- In office 25 June 2000 – 21 July 2009
- Preceded by: Yatarō Mitsubayashi
- Succeeded by: Jō Nakano
- Constituency: Saitama 14th

Personal details
- Born: 5 July 1953 Satte, Saitama, Japan
- Died: 2 August 2010 (aged 57) Satte, Saitama, Japan
- Party: Liberal Democratic
- Relatives: Hiromi Mitsubayashi (brother)
- Education: Saitama Medical School

Takashi Mitsubayashi (三ッ林 隆志, Mitsubayashi Takashi; 5 July 1953 – 2 August 2010) was a Japanese politician of the Liberal Democratic Party, who served as a member of the House of Representatives in the Diet (national legislature). A native of Satte, Saitama and graduate of Saitama Medical School, he was elected to the House of Representatives for the first time in 2000.
