= Saitama 2nd district =

Constituency of the Diet of Japan

- Parliamentary constituency for the Japanese House of Representatives
- Numbered map of Saitama Prefecture single-member districts
- Prefecture: Saitama
- Proportional District: Northern Kanto
- Electorate: 390,882

Current constituency
- Created: 1994
- Seats: One
- Party: Liberal Democratic
- Representative: Yoshitaka Shindō
- Municipalities: Part of Kawaguchi.

Saitama 2nd district (埼玉県第2区, Saitama-ken dai-niku or simply 埼玉2区, Saitama-ken niku ) is a single-member constituency of the House of Representatives in the national Diet of Japan located in Saitama Prefecture.

== Areas covered ==
=== since 2022 ===
- Part of Kawaguchi

=== 2017 - 2022 ===
- Part of Kawaguchi

=== 2013 - 2017 ===
- Kawaguchi

=== 1994 - 2013 ===
- Kawaguchi
- Hatogaya

== List of representatives ==
Election	Representative	Party	Notes
1996	Katsuyuki Ishida	New Frontier	
1996	Katsuyuki Ishida	Reform Club	
2000	Yoshitaka Shindō	Liberal Democratic	
2003	Katsuyuki Ishida	Democratic	
2005	Yoshitaka Shindō	Liberal Democratic	
2009	Katsuyuki Ishida	Democratic	
2012	Yoshitaka Shindō	Liberal Democratic	
2014	Yoshitaka Shindō	Liberal Democratic	
2017	Yoshitaka Shindō	Liberal Democratic	
2021	Yoshitaka Shindō	Liberal Democratic	
2024	Yoshitaka Shindō	Liberal Democratic	
2026	Yoshitaka Shindō	Liberal Democratic	

== Election results ==
=== 2026 ===
2026
Party	Candidate	Votes	%	±%
LDP	Yoshitaka Shindō	75,209	41.8	▲2.1
DPP	Hayato Hosoya	45,521	25.3	
Sanseitō	Shizuka Kanno	31,075	17.3	
Ishin	Hideaki Takahashi	28,187	15.7	▼7.9
Registered electors		385,497		
Turnout			49.40	▲0.94
LDP hold				

=== 2024 ===
2024
Party	Candidate	Votes	%	±%
Liberal Democratic (endorsed by Komeito)	Yoshitaka Shindo (incumbent)	72,467	39.68	▼13.10
Innovation	Hideaki Takahashi (elected in N. Kanto PR)	43,164	23.64	▼1.25
CDP	Matsuura Mototsugu	34,327	18.80	New
Communist	Tomoko Okuda	23,317	12.77	▼9.56
Independent	Daisaku Tsumura	9,348	5.12	New
Majority		29,303	16.04	▼11.85
Registered electors		388,634		
Turnout		182,623	48.46	▼1.89
LDP hold				

=== 2021 ===
2021
Party	Candidate	Votes	%	±%
Liberal Democratic (endorsed by Komeito)	Yoshitaka Shindō (incumbent)	121,543	52.78	
Innovation	Hideaki Takahashi (elected in N. Kanto PR)	57,327	24.89	New
Communist	Tomoko Okuda	51,420	22.33	
Majority		64,216	27.89	
Registered electors		470,538		
Turnout			50.35	▲3.67
LDP hold				

=== 2017 ===
2017
Party	Candidate	Votes	%	±%
Liberal Democratic (endorsed by Komeito)	Yoshitaka Shindō (incumbent)	110,072	52.49	
Kibō no Tō	Katsumi Suga	64,783	30.89	New
Communist	Michiya Hirakawa	34,846	16.62	
Majority		45,289	21.60	
Registered electors		462,995		
Turnout			46.68	▲1.02
LDP hold				

=== 2014 ===
2014
Party	Candidate	Votes	%	±%
Liberal Democratic (endorsed by Komeito)	Yoshitaka Shindō (incumbent)	128,938	64.79	
Communist	Tomoko Okuda	70,074	35.21	
Majority		58,864	29.58	
Registered electors		463,353		
Turnout			45.66	▼9.04
LDP hold				

=== 2012 ===
2012
Party	Candidate	Votes	%	±%
Liberal Democratic (endorsed by Komeito)	Yoshitaka Shindō (PR seat incumbent)	112,484	46.57	
Your (endorsed by JRP)	Yoshikazu Matsumoto	53,604	22.19	New
Democratic (endorsed by PNP)	Katsuyuki Ishida (incumbent)	50,711	21.00	
Communist	Tomoko Okuda	24,724	10.24	
Majority		58,880	24.38	
Registered electors		457,792		
Turnout			54.70	▼8.70
LDP gain from Democratic				

=== 2009 ===
2009
Party	Candidate	Votes	%	±%
Democratic	Katsuyuki Ishida	140,892	50.02	
Liberal Democratic	Yoshitaka Shindō (incumbent) (won PR seat)	112,920	40.09	
Communist	Masatsugu Muraoka	23,357	8.29	
Happiness Realization	Tsuyoshi Suzuki	4,484	1.59	New
Majority		27,972	9.93	
Registered electors		452,200		
Turnout			63.40	▲0.50
Democratic gain from LDP				

=== 2005 ===
2005
Party	Candidate	Votes	%	±%
Liberal Democratic	Yoshitaka Shindō	138,376	51.80	
Democratic	Katsuyuki Ishida (incumbent)	105,080	39.34	
Communist	Nobuhiro Ikeda	23,657	8.86	
Majority		33,296	12.46	
Registered electors		434,389		
Turnout			62.90	▲9.39
LDP gain from Democratic				

=== 2003 ===
2003
Party	Candidate	Votes	%	±%
Democratic	Katsuyuki Ishida	114,322	51.01	
Liberal Democratic	Yoshitaka Shindō (incumbent)	91,095	40.65	
Communist	Tomohiro Nagatsuka	18,706	8.35	
Majority		23,227	10.36	
Turnout			53.51	▼4.43
Democratic gain from LDP				

=== 2000 ===
2000
Party	Candidate	Votes	%	±%
Liberal Democratic	Yoshitaka Shindō (PR seat incumbent)	82,581	35.28	
Reform Club	Katsuyuki Ishida (incumbent)	79,555	33.99	
Democratic	Masanori Taniguchi	38,816	16.58	
Communist	Tomohiro Nagatsuka	33,096	14.14	
Majority		3,026	1.29	
Turnout			57.94	▲4.65
LDP gain from Reform Club (Japan, 1988)				

=== 1996 ===
1996
Party	Candidate	Votes	%	±%
New Frontier	Katsuyuki Ishida	76,252	36.60	New
Liberal Democratic	Yoshitaka Shindō (won PR seat)	75,642	36.31	New
Communist	Takeshi Ishii	35,719	17.15	New
Democratic	Hirotaka Maehara	17,329	8.32	New
Liberal League	Masatoshi Tamura	2,486	1.19	New
Independent	Tsuyoshi Sakai	896	0.43	New
Majority		610	0.29	
Turnout			53.29	
New Frontier win (new seat)				
