= Keiichi Koshimizu =

Japanese politician

- 輿水 恵一
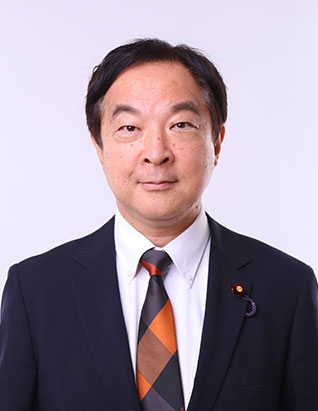
- Official portrait, 2024

Member of the House of Representatives
- Incumbent
- Assumed office 5 November 2021
- Constituency: Northern Kanto PR
- In office 21 December 2012 – 28 September 2017
- Constituency: Northern Kanto PR

Member of the Saitama City Council
- In office 1 May 2003 – 3 December 2012
- Constituency: Minami Ward

Personal details
- Born: 4 February 1962 (age 64) Takane, Yamanashi, Japan
- Party: Komeito
- Other political affiliations: CRA (2026)
- Education: Aoyama Gakuin University

Keiichi Koshimizu is a Japanese politician who is a member of the House of Representatives of Japan.

== Biography ==
He was elected in 2014, 2017, and 2021 as part of the North Kanto Block proportional representation for Komeito. In 2016, he was part of a delegation to visit Israel and Palestine.

In December 2023, he was part of a group that welcomed Kim Jin-Pyo, speaker of the National Assembly of South Korea.
