= Yoshitaka Shindō =

Japanese politician

- 新藤 義孝
- Official portrait, 2023

Minister of State for Economic and Fiscal Policy
- In office 13 September 2023 – 1 October 2024
- Prime Minister: Fumio Kishida
- Preceded by: Shigeyuki Goto
- Succeeded by: Ryosei Akazawa

Minister for Internal Affairs and Communications
- In office 26 December 2012 – 3 September 2014
- Prime Minister: Shinzo Abe
- Preceded by: Shinji Tarutoko
- Succeeded by: Sanae Takaichi

Member of the House of Representatives; from Northern Kanto
- Incumbent
- Assumed office 11 September 2005
- Preceded by: Katsuyuki Ishida
- Constituency: Saitama 2nd (2005–2009); PR block (2009–2012); Saitama 2nd (2012–present)
- In office 25 October 1996 – 10 October 2003
- Preceded by: Constituency established
- Succeeded by: Katsuyuki Ishida
- Constituency: PR block (1996–2000); Saitama 2nd (2000–2003)

Member of the Kawaguchi City Council
- In office 1991–1996

Personal details
- Born: 20 January 1958 (age 68) Kawaguchi, Japan
- Party: Liberal Democratic
- Relations: Tadamichi Kuribayashi (grandfather)
- Education: Meiji University
- Website: Website

Yoshitaka Shindō (新藤 義孝, Shindō Yoshitaka; born 20 January 1958) is a Japanese politician of the Liberal Democratic Party, a member of the House of Representatives in the Diet (national legislature) for Saitama Prefecture 2nd District.

Affiliated to the openly revisionist lobby Nippon Kaigi, Shindo is known for his committed stance on territorial disputes with neighboring countries of Japan, and his recurring visits to the controversial Yasukuni Shrine.

== Early life and education ==
A native of Kawaguchi, Saitama, Shindo was born on 20 January 1958. His mother, Takako Shindō, was a daughter of Tadamichi Kuribayashi, a general of the Imperial Japanese Army best known for having been the commander of the Japanese garrison at the Battle of Iwo Jima. He studied literature at Meiji University and graduated in 1981.

== Career ==
Shindo had worked in the city government of Kawaguchi since 1980 and had served in the assembly of Kawaguchi since 1991. He joined the Liberal Democratic Party and part of the Nukaga faction. He was elected to the House of Representatives for the first time in 1996. In 2002, he was appointed parliamentary secretary for foreign affairs.

He lost his seat in 2003 but was re-elected in 2005 from the Saitama Prefecture District 2. Shindo was named as the vice minister of trade in 2006. In the general elections on 16 December 2012, he was again elected from the Saitama Prefecture District 2. He was appointed minister of internal affairs and communications in the cabinet of Shinzō Abe on 26 December 2012.

Shindo, while serving as the executive acting chairperson of the LDP Policy Research Council, pressed for a 15 trillion-yen stimulus package to counter the effects of inflation on Japanese households. He was a vocal opponent of calls to end the Bank of Japan's easy money policies, saying that "No country uses monetary policy to manipulate currency rates".

Shindo was given 6 ministerial positions in the Second Kishida Cabinet (Second Reshuffle), the most important being Minister in charge of Economic Revitalization. Since entering the cabinet, Shindo has stressed the need for domestic wage growth to drive consumption in order to end Japan's deflationary woes.

A top secretary for the late Motegi Faction, Shindo has been caught-up in the 2023-2024 Japanese slush fund scandal, having told reporters that "We've decided to continue discussions while sharing the idea of dissolving the faction and breaking away from money and personnel affairs". Renhō Saitō of the Constitutional Democratic Party of Japan accused Shindo of personally engaging in the same practices as the greater Motegi Faction, calling it "the Motegi Faction method."

Shindo is head of a kindergarten in his hometown.

== Election history ==
Election	Age	District	Political party	Number of votes	election results
1996 Japanese general election	38	Saitama 2nd district	LDP	75,642	elected by PR
2000 Japanese general election	42	Saitama 2nd district	LDP	82,581	winning
2003 Japanese general election	45	Saitama 2nd district	LDP	91,095	lost
2005 Japanese general election	47	Saitama 2nd district	LDP	138,376	winning
2009 Japanese general election	51	Saitama 2nd district	LDP	112,920	elected by PR
2012 Japanese general election	54	Saitama 2nd district	LDP	112,484	winning
2014 Japanese general election	56	Saitama 2nd district	LDP	128,938	winning
2017 Japanese general election	59	Saitama 2nd district	LDP	110,072	winning
2021 Japanese general election	63	Saitama 2nd district	LDP	121,543	winning
2024 Japanese general election	66	Saitama 2nd district	LDP	72,467	winning

Political offices
Preceded by Shinji Tarutoko	Minister for Internal Affairs and Communications; 2012–2014	Succeeded by Sanae Takaichi
Preceded by Shigeyuki Goto	Minister of State for Economic and Fiscal Policy; 2023-2024	Succeeded by Ryosei Akazawa
Party political offices
Preceded by Yūko Obuchi	Chief of the Organisation and Movement Headquarters, Liberal Democratic Party; 2025-2026	Succeeded by Hirokazu Matsuno
