= Tetsuya Shiokawa =

Japanese politician

- 塩川 鉄也
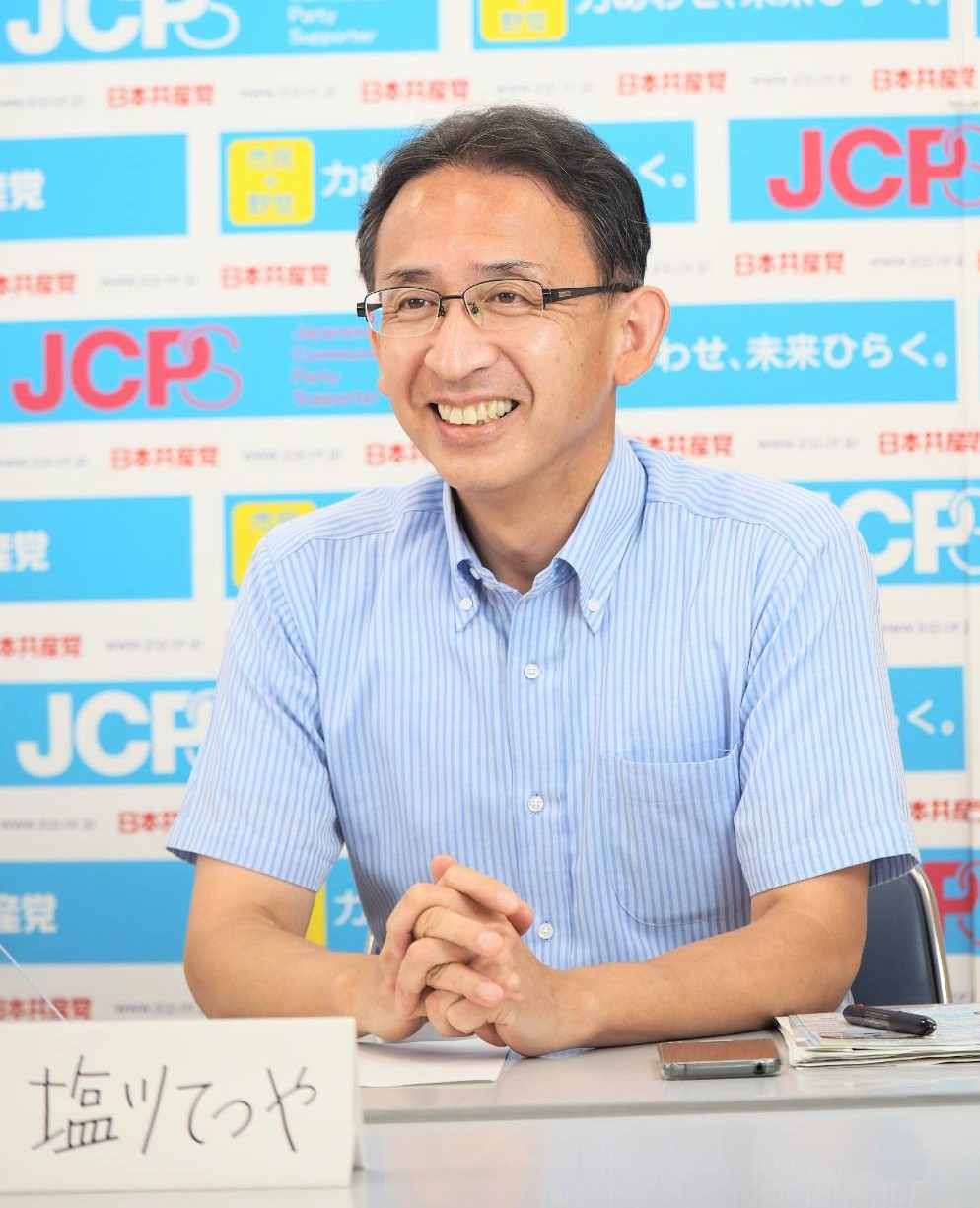
- Shiokawa in 2021

Member of the House of Representatives
- Incumbent
- Assumed office 25 June 2000
- Preceded by: Mitsuhiro Kaneko
- Constituency: Northern Kanto PR

Personal details
- Born: 18 December 1961 (age 64) Iruma, Saitama, Japan
- Party: Communist
- Education: Tokyo Metropolitan University
- Website: web01.cpi-media.co.jp/shiokawa

Tetsuya Shiokawa (塩川鉄也 Shiokawa Tetsuya) is a Japanese politician and former member of the House of Representatives for the Japanese Communist Party.

== Political positions ==
He is against the consumption tax, saying that it is unfair for small businesses.
