= Mikihiko Hashimoto =

Japanese politician (born 1995)

- 橋本 幹彦
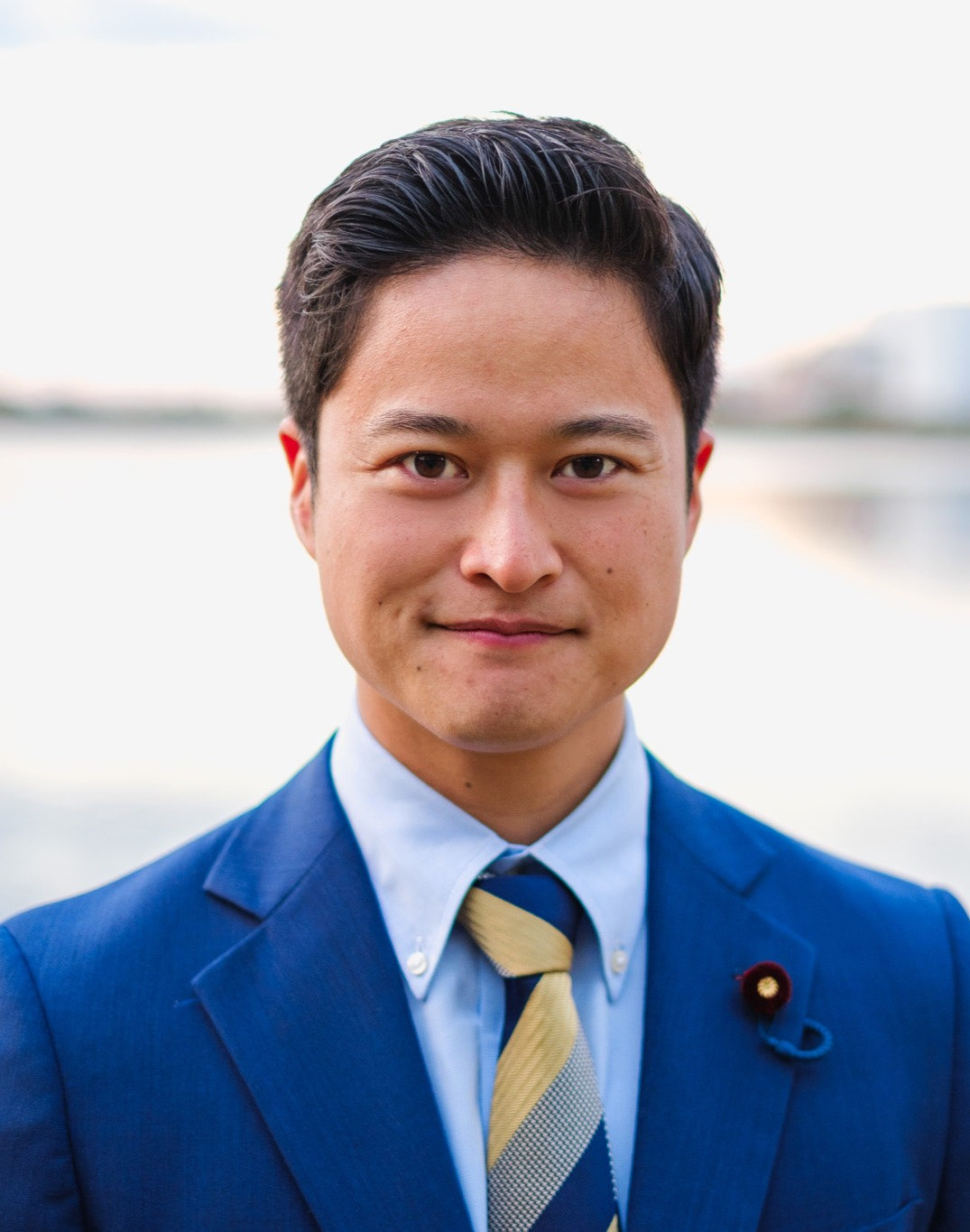
- Hashimoto in 2024

Member of the House of Representatives
- Incumbent
- Assumed office 29 October 2024
- Preceded by: Shinako Tsuchiya
- Succeeded by: Hiromi Mitsubayashi
- Constituency: Saitama 13th (2024–2026); Northern Kanto PR (2026–present)

Personal details
- Born: 27 December 1995 (age 30) Yachiyo, Chiba, Japan
- Party: DPP
- Education: National Defense Academy of Japan

Mikihiko Hashimoto (橋本幹彦, Hashimoto Mikihiko; born 27 December 1995) is a Japanese politician serving as a member of the House of Representatives since 2024. From 2018 to 2019, he served in the Japan Air Self-Defense Force.
