= Hideyuki Nakano =

Japanese politician

- 中野 英幸
- Official portrait, 2022

Member of the House of Representatives; from Northern Kanto
- Incumbent
- Assumed office 2 November 2021
- Preceded by: Saichi Kamiyama
- Constituency: Saitama 7th (2021–2024); PR block (2024–2026); Saitama 7th (2026–present)

Member of the Saitama Prefectural Assembly
- In office 2011 – 24 September 2021

Personal details
- Born: 6 September 1961 (age 65) Kawagoe, Saitama, Japan
- Party: Liberal Democratic
- Parent: Kiyoshi Nakano (father)
- Education: Nihon University

Hideyuki Nakano (born 6 September 1961) is a Japanese politician who is a member of the House of Representatives of Japan.

== Biography ==
He served in the Saitama Prefectural Assembly before his election to the House of Representatives in 1961.
