= Hiromi Mitsubayashi =

Japanese politician (born 1955)

- 三ッ林 裕巳
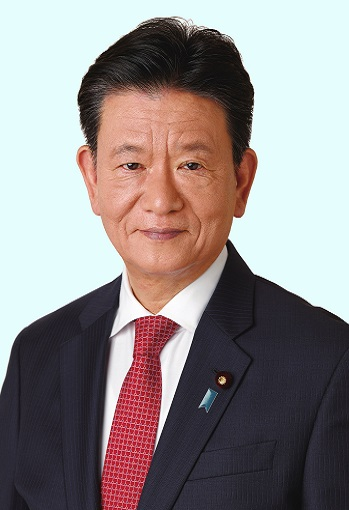
- Official portrait, 2020

Member of the House of Representatives
- Incumbent
- Assumed office 9 February 2026
- Preceded by: Mikihiko Hashimoto
- Constituency: Saitama 13th
- In office 17 December 2012 – 9 October 2024
- Preceded by: Jo Nakano
- Succeeded by: Yoshihiro Suzuki
- Constituency: Saitama 14th

Personal details
- Born: 7 September 1955 (age 71) Satte, Saitama, Japan
- Party: Liberal Democratic
- Relatives: Takashi Mitsubayashi (brother)
- Education: Nihon University
- Website: Hiromi Mitsubayashi website

Hiromi Mitsubayashi (三ッ林 裕巳, Mitsubayashi Hiromi; born 7 September 1955) is a Japanese politician of the Liberal Democratic Party, who serves as a member of the House of Representatives.

== Early years ==
In 1955, Mitsubayashi was born in Satte, Saitama Prefecture. His father was a former member of the House of Representatives, Yataro Mitsubayashi.

In March 1982, he graduated from the Nihon University's Faculty of Medicine, and from June, he worked at the Second Internal Medicine (Kidney, Cardiovascular Medicine) of Itabashi Hospital affiliated with the Nihon University's Faculty of Medicine. After that, he continued to work at a hospital, and in April 1995, he became an assistant professor of science courses at Nippon Dental University.

In 2008, he became the director of the Department of Internal Medicine at the Nippon Dental University Hospital, and in 2009, he became the vice president of the Nippon Dental University Hospital. In April 2011, he became a professor of internal science at Nippon Dental University's Faculty of Life and Dentistry and a professor of clinical practice at Nippon University's Faculty of Medicine.

== Political career ==
In the 2012 general election, Mitsubayashi ran for Saitama 14th district as his brother Takashi Mitsubayashi’s successor, who died in 2010, and defeated DPJ Incumbent Jo Nakano and Restoration’s Yoshihiro Suzuki.

In the 2014 general election, Mitsubayashi defeated Innovation’s Suzuki and hold the seat.

In 2015, Mitsubayashi was appointed to Parliamentary Secretary for Health, Labour and Welfare in the Third Abe First reshuffled cabinet.

In the 2017 general election, Mitsubayashi defeated Kibō’s Suzuki and hold the seat.

In 2020, Mitsubayashi was appointed to State Minister of Cabinet Office in the Suga cabinet.

In the 2021 general election, Mitsubayashi defeated DPP’s Suzuki and hold the seat.

In the 2024 LDP presidential election, Mitsubayashi endorsed Sanae Takaichi as a recommender.

In the 2024 general election, on October 6, 2024, PM Ishiba decided not to nominate members who were suspended from their membership in the general election, including Mitsubayashi, because of the involvement in the slush fund scandal. So Mitsubayashi had to run as an independent. Mitsubayashi ran for Saitama 13th district because of division changes of constituencies. As a result, Mitsubayashi was defeated by DPP's Mikihiko Hashimoto and lost the election due to the slush fund scandal and the 20 million yen scandal described later.

In the 2026 general election, Mitsubayashi was nominated by LDP and defeated DPP’s Hashimoto after a close race.

== Scandal ==
=== Slush fund scandal ===
On 1 December 2023, the Asahi Shimbun reported that Seiwa Seisaku Kenkyūkai, known as Abe faction, is suspected of continuing to systematically kick back to lawmakers with the income collected by its members beyond the sales quota.

On February 1, 2024, Mitsubayashi explained that the total amount of money transferred from the faction was 30 million yen, of which 1.36 million yen was different from the kickback, and that the total amount received the kickback was 29.54 million yen. The Nikkei reported that the Tokyo District Public Prosecutors Office has set a "line of prosecution" to see if the amount of kickback received exceeds 30 million yen.

Mitsubayashi said he used slush funds for parties with fellow lawmakers and for meetings with experts.

On 4 April 2024, LDP held the Party Ethics Committee meeting and decided to suspend Mitsubayashi from office for a year.

On 14 May 2024, the House of Representatives Political Ethics Committee unanimously passed the opposition's petition to attend and explain 44 LDP members who were involved in the slush fund scandal but did not explain themselves to the committee. On 17 May 2024, the House of Councillors Political Ethics Committee unanimously passed a petition for attendance and explanation to 29 members who had not made excuses. All 73 Diet members, including Mitsubayashi, refused to attend, and the ordinary Diet session was closed on 23 June 2024.

=== 20 million yen scandal ===
In the 2024 general election, Shimbun Akahata, daily newspaper published by JCP, reported that 20 million yen was paid to LDP branches headed by candidates, including Mitsubayashi, who were not nominated by LDP because of the involvement in the slush fund scandal.

Hiroshi Moriyama, LDP Secretary-General, admitted reports and explained that it was not to fund the election but to expand the party's position in the future. However, opposition parties pointed out that it was effectively providing campaign funds and criticized the scandal, saying, "LDP is not reflecting on the slush fund scandal."
