= Masahiko Shibayama =

Japanese politician

- 柴山 昌彦
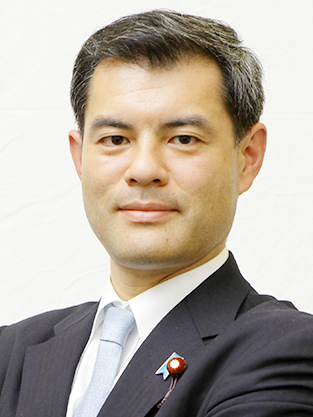
- Official portrait, 2015

Minister of Education, Culture, Sports, Science and Technology
- In office 2 October 2018 – 11 September 2019
- Prime Minister: Shinzo Abe
- Preceded by: Yoshimasa Hayashi
- Succeeded by: Kōichi Hagiuda

Member of the House of Representatives; from Northern Kanto
- Incumbent
- Assumed office 25 April 2004
- Preceded by: Masanori Arai
- Constituency: Saitama 8th (2004–2009); PR block (2009–2012); Saitama 8th (2012–present)

Personal details
- Born: 5 December 1965 (age 60) Nagoya, Aichi, Japan
- Party: Liberal Democratic
- Education: University of Tokyo

Masahiko Shibayama (柴山 昌彦, Shibayama Masahiko; born 5 December 1965) is a Japanese politician. He is a member of the House of Representatives belonging to the Liberal Democratic Party (6th term), Deputy Secretary-General of the Liberal Democratic Party and Chairman of the Federation of Saitama Prefecture Liberal Democratic Party. He served as Minister of Education, Culture, Sports, Science and Technology from October 2018 to September 2019.

== Early life ==
He was born in Nagoya, Aichi and grew up in Saitama Prefecture. He graduated from the University of Tokyo and joined Sumitomo Real Estate in 1990, but resigned thereafter to study for the Japanese bar examination, which he passed in 1998. In 2000, he was admitted as an attorney and joined the Toranomon Chuo Law Firm in Tokyo.

== Political career ==
He was elected to the House of Representatives for the first time in 2004, in a special election in Saitama to replace Masanori Arai, who had been arrested for campaign finance violations. He was re-elected the following year in the Japanese general election. In 2008, he was named Vice-Minister for Foreign Affairs under Prime Minister Yasuo Fukuda and maintained this post under the cabinet of Taro Aso.

Shibayama lost his Saitama seat to a DPJ candidate in the 2009 general election, but picked up a Kanto bloc seat and remained a member of the House of Representatives. After the LDP returned to power in the 2012 general election, he was named Senior Vice-Minister for Internal Affairs and Communications in the second Shinzo Abe cabinet. He also serves as a "special advisor" to the prime minister, acting as a spokesman for the Abe government with regard to its fiscal stimulus policies, and argued in 2016 that "doubling the number of foreign workers [in Japan] cannot be avoided in this global market situation."

== Family ==
Shibayama is married and has one daughter.

Political offices
Preceded by Yoshimasa Hayashi	Minister of Education, Culture, Sports, Science and Technology; 2018–2019	Succeeded by Kōichi Hagiuda
