= Tochigi 3rd district =

Japan House of Representatives constituency

Tochigi 3rd District
- Parliamentary constituency for the Japanese House of Representatives
- Numbered map of Tochigi Prefecture single-member districts
- Prefecture: Tochigi
- Proportional District: Kita-Kantō
- Electorate: 241,014 (2021)

Current constituency
- Created: 1994
- Number of members: One
- Party: Independent
- Representative: Shintarō Watanabe
- Created from: Tochigi's 1st
- Municipalities: Ōtawara, Yaita, Nasushiobara, Nasukarasuyama, Nasu District

Tochigi 3rd district (栃木[県第]3区 Tochigi[-ken dai-]san-ku) is a single-member electoral district for the House of Representatives, the lower house of the National Diet of Japan. Located in north-eastern Tochigi, it covers the cities of Ōtawara, Yaita, Nasushiobara, Nasukarasuyama and the towns of Nasu and Nakagawa in Nasu District. As of September 2011, 247,284 eligible voters were registered in Tochigi 3rd district, giving it well above average (347,878 voters per district) vote weight.

From the creation of the district until 2014, the representative from Tochigi 3rd district was former Liberal Democrat Yoshimi Watanabe who founded Your Party (Minna no Tō, lit. "Everyone's Party") in 2009. In that year, the established parties did not even contest the seat. The only challenger the Democratic Party ever nominated has been Takashi Kobayashi in 2005. In the first three elections, only the left-wing parties contested the seat. In 2014 Watanabe was involved in a scandal over undisclosed loans and lost the next elections to the LDP candidate Kazuo Yana.

Before the electoral reform, the area had been part of the five-member 1st district. Representatives from the 1st district had included Watanabe's father Michio who died in 1995.

Independent candidate Shintarō Watanabe (unrelated to the previous member) won the seat in 2026. This was one of only two districts in which the incumbent Liberal Democratic Party member was defeated in the LDP landslide victory that year (the other being Miyazaki 2nd district).

== List of representatives ==
Representative	Party	Dates	Notes
Yoshimi Watanabe	LDP	1996 – 2009	
Yoshimi Watanabe	Your Party	2009 – 2014	
Kazuo Yana	LDP	2014 – 2026	Elected to the PR Block
Shintarō Watanabe	Independent	2026 –	

== Election results ==
2026
Party	Candidate	Votes	%	±%
Independent	Shintarō Watanabe	58,483	43.9	▲6.7
LDP	Kazuo Yana (elected in N. Kanto PR block)	53,975	40.6	▲3.2
Centrist Reform	Hiroshi Iga	20,611	15.5	▼9.9
Turnout		133,069	58.15	▲5.23
Independent gain from LDP				

2024
Party	Candidate	Votes	%	±%
LDP	Kazuo Yana	45,546	37.4	▼30.0
Independent	Shintarō Watanabe	45,368	37.2	
CDP	Hiroshi Iga	30,913	25.4	▼6.8
Turnout			52.92	▲0.85
LDP hold				

2021
Party	Candidate	Votes	%	±%
LDP	Kazuo Yana	82,398	67.4	▲9.6
CDP	Hiroshi Iga	39,826	32.6	
Turnout			52.07	▼1.59
LDP hold				

2017
Party	Candidate	Votes	%	±%
LDP	Kazuo Yana	74,371	57.8	▲9.0
Kibō no Tō	Miyuki Watanabe	42,820	33.3	
JCP	Shōzō Maki	9,990	7,8	▼3.4
Happiness Realization	Tsuyoshi Ishiwata	1561	1.2	
Turnout			53.66	▼0.93
LDP hold				

2014
Party	Candidate	Votes	%	±%
LDP	Kazuo Yana	62,814	48.74	▲13.66
Independent	Yoshimi Watanabe	51,627	40.05	▼20.21
JCP	Yukiko Akiyama	14,438	11.20	▲6.53
Turnout			54.59	▼3.55

2012
Party	Candidate	Votes	%	±%
YP	Yoshimi Watanabe	84,023	60.3	
LDP (NK)	Kazuo Yana (elected in PR block)	48,912	35.1	
JCP	Yukiko Akiyama	6,509	4.7	

2009
Party	Candidate	Votes	%	±%
YP	Yoshimi Watanabe	142,482	95.3	
HRP	Katsumi Saitō	7,024	4.7	
Turnout		160,021	64.73	

2005
Party	Candidate	Votes	%	±%
LDP	Yoshimi Watanabe	98,889	64.0	
DPJ	Takashi Kobayashi	41,776	27.0	
SDP	Mutsuko Yamaguchi	6,346	4.1	
JCP	Shōzō Maki	5,905	3.8	
Independent (politician)	Susumu Saitō	1,618	1.0	
Turnout		158,777	64.81	

2003
Party	Candidate	Votes	%	±%
LDP	Yoshimi Watanabe	100,539	74.9	
JCP	Shōzō Maki	24,515	18.3	
SDP	Masaki Matsunaga	9,186	6.8	
Turnout		140,709	58.02	

2000
Party	Candidate	Votes	%	±%
LDP	Yoshimi Watanabe	112,358	83.4	
JCP	Shōzō Maki	22,392	16.6	

1996
Party	Candidate	Votes	%	±%
LDP	Yoshimi Watanabe	90,082	83.4	
JCP	Shōzō Maki	17,990	16.6	
Turnout		117,560	51.57	
