= Hideaki Takahashi =

Japanese politician

- 高橋 英明
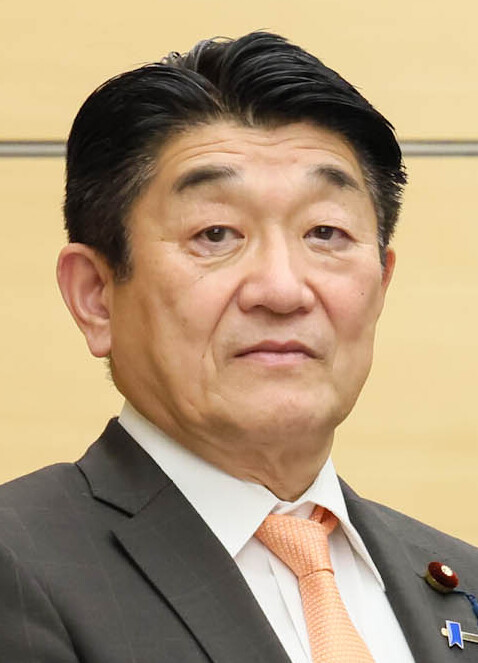
- Takahashi in 2026

Member of the House of Representatives
- In office 5 November 2021 – 23 January 2026
- Constituency: Northern Kanto PR

Member of the Kawaguchi City Council
- In office 2003–2015

Personal details
- Born: 10 May 1963 (age 63) Kawaguchi, Saitama, Japan
- Party: Innovation (since 2016)
- Other political affiliations: LDP (2003–2016)
- Education: Musashi University
- Website: h-nakano.jp

Hideaki Takahashi is a Japanese politician who was a member of the House of Representatives of Japan.
