= Kazuo Yana =

Japanese politician (born 1979)

- 簗 和生
- Official portrait, 2026

Minister of Agriculture, Forestry and Fisheries
- In office 17 September 2026 – 14 October 2026
- Prime Minister: Sanae Takaichi
- Preceded by: Norikazu Suzuki
- Succeeded by: Arata Takebe

Member of the House of Representatives; from Northern Kanto
- Incumbent
- Assumed office 16 December 2012
- Preceded by: Multi-member district
- Constituency: PR block (2012–2014); Tochigi 3rd (2014–2026); PR block (2026–present)

Personal details
- Born: 22 April 1979 (age 47) Koganei, Tokyo, Japan
- Party: Liberal Democratic
- Education: Keio University; University of Tokyo

Kazuo Yana (Japanese: 簗 和生, Yana Kazuo; born 22 April 1979) is a Japanese politician who has served as the Minister of Agriculture, Forestry and Fisheries from September to October 2026. He has served as a member of the House of Representatives as a member of the Liberal Democratic Party (LDP) from Northern Kanto since 2012.

== Biography ==
He earned degrees from Keio University and Tokyo University. He was first elected in 2012 and re-elected in 2014, 2017, 2021.

He had previously said LGBT goes against preservation of species.

In May 2026, Yana made comments about cutting road budgets of municipalities led by mayors who did not support him politically, which he retracted and apologized for five months later when he became agriculture minister since September. Alongside allegations of arranging shuttle buses for his supporters in past election campaigns for the House of Representatives, he decided to resign his cabinet seat in 14 October to avoid further disruption to the National Diet.
