= Northern Kanto proportional representation block =

Japanese House of Representatives constituency

Northern Kanto Proportional Representation Block
- Parliamentary constituency for the Japanese House of Representatives
- Map of House of Representatives proportional blocks, with the Northern Kanto block highlighted
- Prefectures: Gunma, Tochigi, Saitama, and Ibaraki
- Electorate: 11,621,084 (2026)

Current constituency
- Created: 1994
- Number of members: 19

The Northern Kanto proportional representation block (北関東比例ブロック, Kita Kantō hokubu hirei burokku) is one of eleven proportional representation (PR) blocks for the House of Representatives in the Diet of Japan. It consists of the northern part of the Kanto region, and consists of the prefectures of Gunma, Tochigi, Saitama and Ibaraki. Proportional voting blocks were first introduced in the 1996 General Election. The block elects 19 members to the House of Representatives.

== Results timeline ==
=== Vote share ===
Party	1996	2000	2003	2005	2009	2012	2014	2017	2021	2024	2026
LDP	34.88	30.64	37.51	40.25	25.84	28.14	34.56	33.15	35.19	27.54	37.02
NFP	26.66										
DPJ (Note: 1996 DP)	17.16	24.71	37.91	31.45	42.13	15.11	17.83				
JCP	12.85	10.71	6.64	6.65	6.26	5.68	11.67	7.51	7.20	6.09	4.17
SDP	5.02	8.26	3.81	4.51	3.64	1.83	1.85	1.10	1.59	1.50	1.27
NPS	1.37										
Komeito		12.63	14.14	13.04	11.36	12.68	14.74	13.10	13.35	11.59	
LP		12.45									
Nippon				4.10	0.91						
Your					7.93	12.18					
PNP					1.32						
Ishin (Note: 2012 JRP, 2014 JIP)						18.09	13.86	3.39	10.01	6.72	5.35
TPJ						5.99					
PLP							2.23				
CDP								21.99	22.54	22.05	
KnT								19.27			
DPFP									4.83	11.78	10.28
Reiwa									3.88	7.20	2.99
Sanseitō										3.01	8.30
CPJ										2.52	2.47
CRA											19.27
Mirai											7.67
Others	2.06 (Note: NSP 1.22, LL 0.84)	0.60			0.91 (Note: HRP 0.91)	0.31 (Note: HRP 0.31)	3.27 (Note: Generations 2.85, HRP 0.42)	0.49 (Note: HRP 0.49)	1.42 (Note: NHK 1.42)		1.20 (Note: Genyu 1.20)
Turnout		59.82	55.77	65.06	67.08	57.32	52.35	51.56	53.53	51.12	53.20

=== Seat distribution ===
Election	Distribution	Seats
1996		21
2000		20
2003		20
2005		20
2009		20
2012		20
2014		20
2017		19
2021		19
2024		19
2026		19

== Election results ==
=== 2026 ===
2026 results in the Northern Kanto PR block
Party	Votes	Swing	%	Seats	+/–
Liberal Democratic Party (LDP)	2,256,845	37.02	▲9.48	8	▲1
Centrist Reform Alliance (CRA) (Note: Swings compared to CDP and Komeito)	1,174,717	19.27	▼14.37	4	▼4
Democratic Party For the People (DPFP)	626,695	10.28	▼1.50	2	▲1
Sanseitō	506,071	8.30	▲5.29	2	▲2
Team Mirai	467,561	7.67	New	1	New
Japan Innovation Party (Ishin)	326,128	5.35	▼1.37	1	0
Japanese Communist Party (JCP)	254,497	4.17	▼1.92	1	0
Reiwa Shinsengumi (Reiwa)	182,261	2.99	▼4.21	0	▼1
Conservative Party of Japan (CPJ)	150,809	2.47	▼0.05	0	0
Social Democratic Party (SDP)	77,406	1.27	▼0.23	0	0
Tax Cuts Japan and Yukoku Alliance (Genyu)	73,101	1.20	New	0	New
Total	6,096,091	100.00		19	
Invalid votes	86,209	1.39			
Turnout	6,182,300	53.20	▲2.08		
Registered voters	11,621,084				

=== 2024 ===
2024 results in the Northern Kanto PR block
Party	Votes	Swing	%	Seats	+/–
Liberal Democratic Party (LDP)	1,603,644	27.54	▼7.65	7	0
Constitutional Democratic Party of Japan (CDP)	1,283,911	22.05	▼0.49	5	0
Democratic Party For the People (DPFP)	686,080	11.78	▲6.95	1	0
Komeito	674,694	11.59	▼1.76	3	0
Reiwa Shinsengumi (Reiwa)	419,511	7.20	▲3.32	1	▲1
Japan Innovation Party (Ishin)	391,136	6.72	▼3.29	1	▼1
Japanese Communist Party (JCP)	354,915	6.09	▼1.11	1	0
Sanseitō	175,559	3.01	New	0	New
Conservative Party of Japan (CPJ)	146,728	2.52	New	0	New
Social Democratic Party (SDP)	87,247	1.50	▼0.09	0	0
Total	5,823,425	100.00		19	
Invalid votes	152,018	2.54			
Turnout	5,975,443	51.12	▼2.41		
Registered voters	11,689,496				

=== 2021 ===
2021 results in the Northern Kanto PR block
Party	Votes	Swing	%	Seats	+/–
Liberal Democratic Party (LDP)	2,172,065	35.19	▲2.04	7	0
Constitutional Democratic Party of Japan (CDP)	1,391,148	22.54	▲0.55	5	0
Komeito	823,930	13.35	▲0.25	3	▲1
Japan Innovation Party (Ishin)	617,531	10.01	▲6.62	2	▲2
Japanese Communist Party (JCP)	444,115	7.20	▼0.31	1	0
Democratic Party For the People (DPFP)	298,056	4.83	New	1	New
Reiwa Shinsengumi (Reiwa)	239,592	3.88	New	0	New
Social Democratic Party (SDP)	97,963	1.59	▲0.49	0	0
NHK Party	87,702	1.42	New	0	New
Total	6,172,102	100.00		19	
Invalid votes	146,289	2.32			
Turnout	6,318,391	53.53	▲1.97		
Registered voters	11,802,865				

=== 2017 ===
2017 results in the Northern Kanto PR block
Party	Votes	Swing	%	Seats	+/–
Liberal Democratic Party (LDP)	1,985,993	33.15	▼1.41	7	▼1
Constitutional Democratic Party of Japan (CDP)	1,317,457	21.99	New	5	New
Kibō no Tō	1,154,154	19.27	New	4	New
Komeito	784,671	13.10	▼1.64	2	▼1
Japanese Communist Party (JCP)	449,625	7.51	▼4.16	1	▼1
Japan Innovation Party (Ishin)	203,103	3.39	New	0	New
Social Democratic Party (SDP)	65,985	1.10	▼0.75	0	0
Happiness Realization Party (HRP)	29,504	0.49	▲0.07	0	0
Total	5,990,492	100.00		19	▼1
Invalid votes	109,891	1.80			
Turnout	6,100,383	51.56	▼0.79		
Registered voters	11,831,563				

=== 2014 ===
2014 results in the Northern Kanto PR block
Party	Votes	Swing	%	Seats	+/–
Liberal Democratic Party (LDP)	2,034,586	34.56	▲6.42	8	▲2
Democratic Party of Japan (DPJ)	1,049,602	17.83	▲2.72	4	▲1
Komeito	868,102	14.74	▲2.06	3	0
Japan Innovation Party (JIP)	816,014	13.86	▼4.23	3	▼1
Japanese Communist Party (JCP)	686,893	11.67	▲5.99	2	▲1
Party for Future Generations	167,632	2.85	New	0	New
People's Life Party (PLP)	131,013	2.23	New	0	New
Social Democratic Party (SDP)	109,038	1.85	▲0.02	0	0
Happiness Realization Party (HRP)	24,989	0.42	▲0.11	0	0
Total	5,887,869	100.00		20	
Invalid votes	163,004	2.69			
Turnout	6,050,873	52.35	▼4.97		
Registered voters	11,557,934				

=== 2012 ===
2012 results in the Northern Kanto PR block
Party	Votes	Swing	%	Seats	+/–
Liberal Democratic Party (LDP)	1,820,116	28.14	▲2.30	6	0
Japan Restoration Party (JRP)	1,169,781	18.09	New	4	New
Democratic Party of Japan (DPJ)	976,922	15.11	▼27.02	3	▼7
Komeito	820,358	12.68	▲1.32	3	▲1
Your Party	787,462	12.18	▲4.25	2	▲1
Tomorrow Party of Japan (TPJ)	387,625	5.99	New	1	New
Japanese Communist Party (JCP)	367,245	5.68	▼0.58	1	0
Social Democratic Party (SDP)	118,046	1.83	▼1.81	0	0
Happiness Realization Party (HRP)	19,795	0.31	▼0.60	0	0
Total	6,467,350	100.00		20	
Invalid votes	144,080	2.18			
Turnout	6,611,430	57.32	▼9.76		
Registered voters	11,535,234				

=== 2009 ===
2009 results in the Northern Kanto PR block
Party	Votes	Swing	%	Seats	+/–
Democratic Party of Japan (DPJ)	3,172,577	42.13	▲10.68	10	▲3
Liberal Democratic Party (LDP)	1,945,933	25.84	▼14.41	6	▼3
Komeito	855,134	11.36	▼1.68	2	0
Your Party	597,025	7.93	New	1	New
Japanese Communist Party (JCP)	471,138	6.26	▼0.39	1	0
Social Democratic Party (SDP)	274,030	3.64	▼0.87	0	▼1
People's New Party (PNP)	99,354	1.32	New	0	New
New Party Nippon (Nippon)	68,191	0.91	▼3.19	0	0
Happiness Realization Party (HRP)	46,867	0.91	New	0	New
Total	7,530,249	100.00		20	
Invalid votes	164,820	2.14			
Turnout	7,695,069	67.08	▲2.02		
Registered voters	11,470,918				

=== 2005 ===
2005 results in the Northern Kanto PR block
Party	Votes	Swing	%	Seats	+/–
Liberal Democratic Party (LDP)	2,892,780	40.25	▲2.74	9	▲1
Democratic Party of Japan (DPJ)	2,260,717	31.45	▼6.46	7	▼1
Komeito	937,345	13.04	▲1.10	2	▼1
Japanese Communist Party (JCP)	477,958	6.65	▲0.01	1	0
Social Democratic Party (SDP)	323,979	4.51	▲0.70	1	▲1
New Party Nippon (Nippon)	294,952	4.10	New	0	New
Total	7,187,731	100.00		20	
Invalid votes	170,879	2.32			
Turnout	7,358,610	65.06	▲9.29		
Registered voters	11,310,313				

=== 2003 ===
2003 results in the Northern Kanto PR block
Party	Votes	Swing	%	Seats	+/–
Democratic Party of Japan (DPJ)	2,299,620	37.91	▲13.20	8	▲3
Liberal Democratic Party (LDP)	2,275,223	37.51	▲6.87	8	▲1
Komeito	857,490	14.14	▲1.51	3	0
Japanese Communist Party (JCP)	402,849	6.64	▼4.07	1	▼1
Social Democratic Party (SDP)	231,140	3.81	▼4.45	0	▼1
Total	6,066,322	100.00		20	
Invalid votes	185,682	2.97			
Turnout	6,252,004	55.77	▼4.05		
Registered voters	11,210,273				

=== 2000 ===
2000 results in the Northern Kanto PR block
Party	Votes	Swing	%	Seats	+/–
Liberal Democratic Party (LDP)	1,924,629	30.64	▼4.24	7	▼1
Democratic Party of Japan (DPJ)	1,552,220	24.71	▲7.55	5	▲1
Komeito	793,124	12.63	New	3	New
Liberal Party (LP)	781,818	12.45	New	2	New
Japanese Communist Party (JCP)	672,615	10.71	▼2.14	2	0
Social Democratic Party (SDP)	518,647	8.26	▲3.24	1	0
Liberal League (LL)	37,767	0.60	▼0.24	0	0
Total	6,280,820	100.00		20	▼1
Invalid votes	281,929	4.30			
Turnout	6,562,749	59.82			
Registered voters	10,970,091				

=== 1996 ===
1996 results in the Northern Kanto PR block
Party	Votes	%	Seats
Liberal Democratic Party (LDP)	1,962,854	34.88	8
New Frontier Party (NFP)	1,500,349	26.66	6
Democratic Party (DP)	965,328	17.16	4
Japanese Communist Party (JCP)	722,792	12.85	2
Social Democratic Party (SDP)	282,201	5.02	1
New Party Sakigake (NPS)	77,255	1.37	0
New Socialist Party (NSP)	68,926	1.22	0
Liberal League (LL)	47,020	0.84	0
Total	5,626,725	100.00	21

== See also ==
- List of districts of the House of Representatives of Japan
