= Results of the 2026 Japanese general election =

Results of the 2026 Japanese House of Representatives

- 8 February 2026
- All 465 seats in the House of Representatives; 233 seats needed for a majority
| Party | Leader | Seats | +/– |
|---|---|---|---|
| LDP | Sanae Takaichi | 316 | +125 |
| Centrist Reform | Yoshihiko Noda; Tetsuo Saito | 49 | −123 |
| Ishin | Hirofumi Yoshimura; Fumitake Fujita | 36 | −2 |
| DPP | Yuichiro Tamaki | 28 | 0 |
| Sanseitō | Sohei Kamiya | 15 | +12 |
| Team Mirai | Takahiro Anno | 11 | New |
| JCP | Tomoko Tamura | 4 | −4 |
| Reiwa | Taro Yamamoto | 1 | −8 |
| Genzei–Yukoku | Takashi Kawamura; Kazuhiro Haraguchi | 1 | New |
| Independents | — | 4 | −8 |
This lists parties that won seats. See the complete results below.
- Constituency seats
- All 289 seats
| Party | Vote % | Seats | +/– |
|---|---|---|---|
| LDP | 49.23 | 249 | +117 |
| Ishin | 6.63 | 20 | −3 |
| DPP | 7.52 | 8 | −3 |
| Centrist Reform | 21.63 | 7 | −101 |
| Genzei–Yukoku | 0.63 | 1 | New |
| Independents | 2.08 | 4 | −8 |
This lists parties that won seats. See the complete results below.
- Proportional seats
- All 176 seats
| Party | Vote % | Seats | +/– |
|---|---|---|---|
| LDP | 36.72 | 67 | +8 |
| Centrist Reform | 18.23 | 42 | −22 |
| DPP | 9.73 | 20 | +3 |
| Ishin | 8.63 | 16 | +1 |
| Sanseitō | 7.44 | 15 | +12 |
| Team Mirai | 6.66 | 11 | New |
| JCP | 4.40 | 4 | −3 |
| Reiwa | 2.92 | 1 | −8 |
This lists parties that won seats. See the complete results below.
Results by constituency shaded according to vote strength
| Prime Minister before | Prime Minister after election |
|---|---|
| Sanae Takaichi; LDP | Sanae Takaichi; LDP |

This article presents detailed results of the 2026 Japanese general election. The results are separated into each of the eleven proportional representation blocks and their corresponding prefectures. In the following tables, candidates elected via single-member district are highlighted in green, while candidates elected via proportional representation are highlighted in red.

== Electoral system ==
The House of Representatives is elected via parallel voting. In the 2026 election, 289 members were elected in single-member districts and 176 via party-list proportional representation in eleven multi-member constituencies, referred to as "PR blocks". Single-member districts are apportioned between prefectures and numbered (1st, 2nd, etc). Candidates may run solely in a single-member district, solely in PR, or both (dual listing). Dual listed candidates must win at least 10% of the vote in their single-member district in order to be eligible for election via PR. Dual listed candidates who win their single-member district race are not eligible for election via PR.

Candidates on PR lists may be ranked sequentially or, if they are dual listed, ranked equally with one another. If ranked equally, the best-loser ratio (sekihairitsu) of each candidate determines the order of election. This number is determined by dividing their single-member district votes by those of the winning candidate in that district. In this way, the losing candidates who performed best will be elected first.

If a party wins more PR seats than they have eligible candidates on their list, the unfilled seats will be distributed to other parties in accordance with the PR formula.

== Hokkaido block ==
2026 Japanese general election in Hokkaido
- 8 February 2026

All 20 seats to the House of Representatives
| | Majority party | Minority party | Third party |
|---|---|---|---|
| Party | LDP | CRA | DPP |
| Last election | 6 seats | 13 seats (Note: CDP and Komeito) | 1 seat |
| Constituency | 11 | 1 | 0 |
| PR seats | 4 | 3 | 1 |
| Total | 15 | 4 | 1 |
| Seat change | ▲9 | ▼9 | 0 |

Single-member constituency results in Hokkaido
| Constituency | Previous member | | Elected member | | Votes | % | Margin | Runner-up | | % | Status |
|---|---|---|---|---|---|---|---|---|---|---|---|
| Hokkaido 1st | Daiki Michishita | CRA | Takahiro Katō | LDP | 112,618 | 43.6 | 31,058 | Daika Michishita | CRA | 31.6 | LDP gain from CRA |
| Hokkaido 2nd | Kenko Matsuki | CRA | Yūsuke Takahashi | LDP | 102,343 | 42.9 | 29,673 | Kenko Matsuki | CRA | 30.4 | LDP gain from CRA |
| Hokkaido 3rd | Yutaka Arai | CRA | Hirohisa Takagi | LDP | 114,285 | 46.5 | 32,967 | Yutaka Arai | CRA | 33.1 | LDP gain from CRA |
| Hokkaido 4th | Kureha Otsuki | CRA | Hiroyuki Nakamura | LDP | 105,656 | 47.3 | 22,140 | Kureha Otsuki | CRA | 37.4 | LDP gain from CRA |
| Hokkaido 5th | Maki Ikeda | CRA | Yoshiaki Wada | LDP | 143,229 | 57.5 | 37,385 | Maki Ikeda | CRA | 42.5 | LDP gain from CRA |
| Hokkaido 6th | Kuniyoshi Azuma | LDP | Kuniyoshi Azuma | LDP | 121,276 | 56.1 | 41,322 | Masahito Nishikawa | CRA | 37.0 | LDP hold |
| Hokkaido 7th | Takako Suzuki | LDP | Takako Suzuki | LDP | 89,336 | 65.7 | 42,748 | Naoko Shinoda | CRA | 34.3 | LDP hold |
| Hokkaido 8th | Seiji Osaka | CRA | Jun Mukōyama | LDP | 108,229 | 55.3 | 20,703 | Seiji Osaka | CRA | 44.7 | LDP gain from CRA |
| Hokkaido 9th | Tatsumaru Yamaoka | CRA | Hideki Matsushita | LDP | 87,984 | 43.1 | 6,921 | Tatsumaru Yamaoka | CRA | 39.7 | LDP gain from CRA |
| Hokkaido 10th | Hiroshi Kamiya | CRA | Hiroshi Kamiya | CRA | 74,908 | 50.0 | 21 | Koichi Watanabe | LDP | 50.0 | CRA hold |
| Hokkaido 11th | Kaori Ishikawa | CRA | Kōichi Nakagawa | LDP | 86,019 | 50.1 | 13,068 | Kaori Ishikawa | CRA | 42.5 | LDP gain from CRA |
| Hokkaido 12th | Arata Takebe | LDP | Arata Takebe | LDP | 92,400 | 58.8 | 27,681 | Eisei Kawaharada | CRA | 41.2 | LDP hold |

Proportional representation results
| Party | Votes | Seats | Rank | Elected member | Constituency | Ratio |
|---|---|---|---|---|---|---|
| LDP | 911,742 (37.0%) | 4 | 6 | Yoshitaka Itō | | |
| LDP | 911,742 (37.0%) | 4 | 7 | Koichi Watanabe | Hokkaido 10th | 99.9% |
| LDP | 911,742 (37.0%) | 4 | 14 | Nagisa Muraki | | |
| LDP | 911,742 (37.0%) | 4 | 15 | Yuri Yoshida | | |
| CRA | 605,889 (24.6%) | 3 | 1 | Hidemachi Sato | | |
| CRA | 605,889 (24.6%) | 3 | 2 | Tomoko Ukishima | | |
| CRA | 605,889 (24.6%) | 3 | 3 | Tatsumaru Yamaoka | Hokkaido 9th | 92.1% |
| DPFP | 218,850 (8.9%) | 1 | 1 | Hidetake Usuki | Hokkaido 1st | 25.8% |

== Tohoku block ==
2026 Japanese general election in Tohoku
- 8 February 2026

All 33 seats to the House of Representatives
| | Majority party | Minority party | Third party |
|---|---|---|---|
| Party | LDP | CRA | DPP |
| Last election | 14 seats | 16 seats | 2 seats |
| Constituency | 19 | 1 | 1 |
| PR seats | 6 | 3 | 1 |
| Total | 25 | 4 | 2 |
| Seat change | ▲11 | ▼12 | 0 |
| | Fourth party | Fifth party |
| Party | Sanseito | Mirai |
| Last election | 0 seats | New |
| Constituency | 0 | 0 |
| PR seats | 1 | 1 |
| Total | 1 | 1 |
| Seat change | ▲1 | ▲1 |

Single-member constituency results in Tohoku
| Constituency | Previous member | | Elected member | | Votes | % | Margin | Runner-up | | % | Status |
|---|---|---|---|---|---|---|---|---|---|---|---|
| Aomori 1st | Jun Tsushima | LDP | Jun Tsushima | LDP | 72,060 | 50.9 | 25,824 | Sekio Masuta | CRA | 32.6 | LDP hold |
| Aomori 2nd | Junichi Kanda | LDP | Junichi Kanda | LDP | 104,608 | 54.6 | 53,581 | Kazuhiko Matsuo | CRA | 26.6 | LDP hold |
| Aomori 3rd | Hanako Okada | CRA | Jiro Kimura | LDP | 83,547 | 52.3 | 15,943 | Hanako Okada | CRA | 42.3 | LDP gain from CRA |
| Iwate 1st | Takeshi Shina | CRA | Takeshi Shina | CRA | 73,209 | 44.2 | 5,398 | Hiromasa Yonai | LDP | 40.9 | CRA hold |
| Iwate 2nd | Shun'ichi Suzuki | LDP | Shun'ichi Suzuki | LDP | 123,711 | 64.8 | 56,417 | Makoto Sasaki | DPFP | 53.2 | LDP hold |
| Iwate 3rd | Ichirō Ozawa | CRA | Takashi Fujiwara | LDP | 102,578 | 48.6 | 23,847 | Ichirō Ozawa | CRA | 37.3 | LDP gain from CRA |
| Miyagi 1st | Akiko Okamoto | CRA | Tōru Doi | LDP | 110,185 | 45.0 | 32,079 | Akiko Okamoto | CRA | 31.9 | LDP gain from CRA |
| Miyagi 2nd | Sayuri Kamata | CRA | Katsuyuki Watanabe | LDP | 101,364 | 41.4 | 27,669 | Sayuri Kamata | CRA | 30.1 | LDP gain from CRA |
| Miyagi 3rd | Tsuyoshi Yanagisawa | CRA | Akihiro Nishimura | LDP | 83,705 | 54.7 | 36,402 | Tsuyoshi Yanagisawa | CRA | 30.9 | LDP gain from CRA |
| Miyagi 4th | Jun Azumi | CRA | Chisato Morishita | LDP | 124,250 | 57.1 | 45,579 | Jun Azumi | CRA | 36.2 | LDP gain from CRA |
| Miyagi 5th | Itsunori Onodera | LDP | Itsunori Onodera | LDP | 138,094 | 77.4 | 107,403 | Tsuneharu Sakai | CRA | 17.2 | LDP hold |
| Akita 1st | Hiroyuki Togashi | LDP | Hiroyuki Togashi | LDP | 65,940 | 46.5 | 40,430 | Sachiko Kimura | DPFP | 18.0 | LDP hold |
| Akita 2nd | Takashi Midorikawa | CRA | Junji Fukuhara | LDP | 70,352 | 55.0 | 12,686 | Takashi Midorikawa | CRA | 45.0 | LDP gain from CRA |
| Akita 3rd | Toshihide Muraoka | DPFP | Toshihide Muraoka | DPFP | 87,573 | 50.7 | 2,510 | Nobuhide Minorikawa | LDP | 49.3 | DPFP hold |
| Yamagata 1st | Toshiaki Endo | LDP | Hiroaki Endo | LDP | 106,063 | 61.2 | 57,620 | Masahiro Harada | CRA | 28.0 | LDP hold |
| Yamagata 2nd | Norikazu Suzuki | LDP | Norikazu Suzuki | LDP | 124,512 | 68.3 | 74,708 | Daijiro Kikuchi | DPFP | 27.3 | LDP hold |
| Yamagata 3rd | Ayuko Kato | LDP | Ayuko Kato | LDP | 90,730 | 58.2 | 58,298 | Takuma Ochiai | CRA | 20.8 | LDP hold |
| Fukushima 1st | Emi Kaneko | CRA | Naotoshi Nishiyama | LDP | 99,531 | 45.2 | 6,060 | Emi Kaneko | CRA | 42.5 | LDP gain from CRA |
| Fukushima 2nd | Kōichirō Genba | CRA | Taku Nemoto | LDP | 128,948 | 52.0 | 38,802 | Kōichirō Genba | CRA | 36.4 | LDP gain from CRA |
| Fukushima 3rd | Shinji Oguma | CRA | Kentaro Uesugi | LDP | 107,649 | 57.0 | 30,638 | Shinji Oguma | CRA | 40.8 | LDP gain from CRA |
| Fukushima 4th | Ryutaro Sakamoto | LDP | Ryutaro Sakamoto | LDP | 100,795 | 49.3 | 46,123 | Yuki Saito | CRA | 26.8 | LDP hold |

Proportional representation results
| Party | Votes | Seats | Rank | Elected member | Constituency | Ratio |
|---|---|---|---|---|---|---|
| LDP | 1,612,576 (41.2%) | 6 | 1 | Akinori Eto | | |
| LDP | 1,612,576 (41.2%) | 6 | 2 | Nobuhide Minorikawa | Akita 3rd | 97.1% |
| LDP | 1,612,576 (41.2%) | 6 | 2 | Hiromasa Yonai | Iwate 1st | 92.6% |
| LDP | 1,612,576 (41.2%) | 6 | 23 | Shintaro Ito | | |
| LDP | 1,612,576 (41.2%) | 6 | 24 | Ichirō Kanke | | |
| LDP | 1,612,576 (41.2%) | 6 | 25 | Kenya Akiba | | |
| CRA | 828,883 (21.2%) | 3 | 1 | Ken'ichi Shoji | | |
| CRA | 828,883 (21.2%) | 3 | 2 | Yoshifu Arita | | |
| CRA | 828,883 (21.2%) | 3 | 3 | Emi Kaneko | Fukushima 1st | 93.9% |
| DPFP | 389,503 (9.9%) | 1 | 1 | Makoto Sasaki | Iwate 2nd | 54.3% |
| Sansei | 278,410 (7.1%) | 1 | 1 | Masamune Wada | Miyagi 2nd | 35.6% |
| Mirai | 234,050 (6.0%) | 1 | 1 | Takumi Hayashi | | |

== Northern Kanto block ==
2026 Japanese general election in Northern Kanto
- 8 February 2026

All 52 seats to the House of Representatives
| | Majority party | Minority party | Third party |
|---|---|---|---|
| Party | LDP | CRA | DPP |
| Last election | 26 seats | 17 seats | 4 seats |
| Constituency | 30 | 0 | 1 |
| PR seats | 8 | 4 | 2 |
| Total | 38 | 4 | 3 |
| Seat change | ▲12 | ▼13 | ▼1 |
| | Fourth party | Fifth party | Sixth party |
| Party | Sanseito | Mirai | Ishin |
| Last election | 0 seats | New | 1 seat |
| Constituency | 0 | 0 | 0 |
| PR seats | 2 | 1 | 1 |
| Total | 2 | 1 | 1 |
| Seat change | ▲2 | ▲1 | 0 |
| | Seventh party |
| Party | JCP |
| Last election | 1 seat |
| Constituency | 0 |
| PR seats | 1 |
| Total | 1 |
| Seat change | 0 |

Single-member constituency results in Northern Kanto
| Constituency | Previous member | | Elected member | | Votes | % | Margin | Runner-up | | % | Status |
|---|---|---|---|---|---|---|---|---|---|---|---|
| Ibaraki 1st | Nobuyuki Fukushima | Ind. | Yoshinori Tadokoro | LDP | 87,570 | 41.6 | 2,867 | Nobuyuki Fukushima | Ind. | 40.3 | LDP gain from Ind. |
| Ibaraki 2nd | Fukushiro Nukaga | LDP | Fukushiro Nukaga | LDP | 74,491 | 54.2 | 44,009 | Takumi Onuma | CRA | 22.2 | LDP hold |
| Ibaraki 3rd | Yasuhiro Hanashi | LDP | Yasuhiro Hanashi | LDP | 103,231 | 51.3 | 47,088 | Hiroki Kajioka | CRA | 27.9 | LDP hold |
| Ibaraki 4th | Hiroshi Kajiyama | LDP | Hiroshi Kajiyama | LDP | 106,286 | 83.1 | 84,676 | Tsubasa Yoshida | JCP | 16.9 | LDP hold |
| Ibaraki 5th | Satoshi Asano | DPFP | Satoshi Asano | DPFP | 70,438 | 60.4 | 24,297 | Takumi Suzuki | LDP | 39.6 | DPFP hold |
| Ibaraki 6th | Yamato Aoyama | Ind. | Ayano Kunimitsu | LDP | 107,388 | 43.2 | 2,544 | Yamato Aoyama | Ind. | 42.2 | LDP gain from Ind. |
| Ibaraki 7th | Hayato Nakamura | Ind. | Hayato Nakamura | Ind. | 84,930 | 52.5 | 8,230 | Keiko Nagaoka | LDP | 47.5 | Ind. hold |
| Tochigi 1st | Hajime Funada | LDP | Hajime Funada | LDP | 85,199 | 40.5 | 39,956 | Atsushi Koike | CRA | 21.5 | LDP hold |
| Tochigi 2nd | Akio Fukuda | CRA | Kiyoshi Igarashi | LDP | 66,681 | 51.8 | 21,552 | Akio Fukuda | CRA | 35.1 | LDP gain from CRA |
| Tochigi 3rd | Kazuo Yana | LDP | Shintaro Watanabe | Ind. | 58,483 | 43.9 | 4,508 | Kazuo Yana | LDP | 40.6 | Ind. gain from LDP |
| Tochigi 4th | Takao Fujioka | CRA | Masaru Ishizaka | LDP | 87,743 | 47.1 | 13,278 | Takao Fujioka | CRA | 39.9 | LDP gain from CRA |
| Tochigi 5th | Toshimitsu Motegi | LDP | Toshimitsu Motegi | LDP | 110,743 | 68.2 | 91,117 | Takafumi Terada | DPFP | 12.1 | LDP hold |
| Gunma 1st | Yasutaka Nakasone | LDP | Yasutaka Nakasone | LDP | 103,316 | 61.6 | 54,992 | Masatake Kawamura | CRA | 28.8 | LDP hold |
| Gunma 2nd | Toshiro Ino | LDP | Toshiro Ino | LDP | 84,167 | 52.7 | 61,940 | Kazutaka Hara | DPFP | 13.9 | LDP hold |
| Gunma 3rd | Hiroyoshi Sasagawa | LDP | Hiroyoshi Sasagawa | LDP | 96,283 | 61.5 | 36,079 | Kaichi Hasegawa | CRA | 38.5 | LDP hold |
| Gunma 4th | Tatsuo Fukuda | LDP | Tatsuo Fukuda | LDP | 84,938 | 53.4 | 49,032 | Hitomi Aoki | Sansei | 22.6 | LDP hold |
| Gunma 5th | Yūko Obuchi | LDP | Yūko Obuchi | LDP | 107,356 | 68.6 | 58,169 | Tomoki Kogure | Sansei | 31.4 | LDP hold |
| Saitama 1st | Hideki Murai | LDP | Hideki Murai | LDP | 121,002 | 55.7 | 53,022 | Koichi Takemasa | CRA | 31.3 | LDP hold |
| Saitama 2nd | Yoshitaka Shindō | LDP | Yoshitaka Shindō | LDP | 75,209 | 41.8 | 29,688 | Hayato Hosoya | DPFP | 25.3 | LDP hold |
| Saitama 3rd | Hitoshi Kikawada | LDP | Hitoshi Kikawada | LDP | 96,335 | 52.2 | 35,905 | Chiharu Takeuchi | CRA | 32.7 | LDP hold |
| Saitama 4th | Yasushi Hosaka | LDP | Yasushi Hosaka | LDP | 110,312 | 52.9 | 53,730 | Mitsuhiro Kishida | DPFP | 27.1 | LDP hold |
| Saitama 5th | Yukio Edano | CRA | Yutaka Ihara | LDP | 104,836 | 47.4 | 14,041 | Yukio Edano | CRA | 41.0 | LDP gain from CRA |
| Saitama 6th | Atsushi Oshima | CRA | Akihito Obana | LDP | 91,049 | 41.0 | 9,540 | Atsushi Oshima | CRA | 36.7 | LDP gain from CRA |
| Saitama 7th | Yasuko Komiyama | CRA | Hideyuki Nakano | LDP | 107,470 | 57.2 | 27,037 | Yasuko Komiyama | CRA | 42.8 | LDP gain from CRA |
| Saitama 8th | Masahiko Shibayama | LDP | Masahiko Shibayama | LDP | 118,529 | 52.4 | 50,704 | Tomoko Ichiki | CRA | 30.0 | LDP hold |
| Saitama 9th | Shinji Sugimura | CRA | Taku Otsuka | LDP | 112,062 | 55.0 | 20,257 | Shinji Sugimura | CRA | 45.0 | LDP gain from CRA |
| Saitama 10th | Yūnosuke Sakamoto | CRA | Susumu Yamaguchi | LDP | 95,847 | 55.3 | 18,362 | Yūnosuke Sakamoto | CRA | 44.7 | LDP gain from CRA |
| Saitama 11th | Ryuji Koizumi | LDP | Ryuji Koizumi | LDP | 88,744 | 53.4 | 56,236 | Makoto Shimada | CRA | 19.5 | LDP hold |
| Saitama 12th | Toshikazu Morita | CRA | Atsushi Nonaka | LDP | 102,382 | 55.8 | 21,279 | Toshikazu Morita | CRA | 44.2 | LDP gain from CRA |
| Saitama 13th | Mikihiko Hashimoto | DPFP | Hiromi Mitsubayashi | LDP | 75,992 | 39.3 | 6,528 | Mikihiko Hashimoto | DPFP | 36.0 | LDP gain from DPFP |
| Saitama 14th | Yoshihiro Suzuki | DPFP | Makoto Fujita | LDP | 77,481 | 40.7 | 7,095 | Yoshihiro Suzuki | DPFP | 37.0 | LDP gain from DPFP |
| Saitama 15th | Ryosei Tanaka | LDP | Ryosei Tanaka | LDP | 114,320 | 52.3 | 57,314 | Tsuneko Oyamada | CRA | 26.1 | LDP hold |
| Saitama 16th | Shinako Tsuchiya | LDP | Shinako Tsuchiya | LDP | 98,187 | 55.8 | 34,035 | Sota Misumi | CRA | 36.5 | LDP hold |

Proportional representation results
| Party | Votes | Seats | Rank | Elected member | Constituency | Ratio |
|---|---|---|---|---|---|---|
| LDP | 2,256,845 (37.0%) | 8 | 1 | Kazuo Yana | Tochigi 3rd | 92.2% |
| LDP | 2,256,845 (37.0%) | 8 | 1 | Keiko Nagaoka | Ibaraki 7th | 90.3% |
| LDP | 2,256,845 (37.0%) | 8 | 1 | Takumi Suzuki | Ibaraki 5th | 65.5% |
| LDP | 2,256,845 (37.0%) | 8 | 31 | Kazuyuki Nakane | | |
| LDP | 2,256,845 (37.0%) | 8 | 32 | Masayoshi Saijo | | |
| LDP | 2,256,845 (37.0%) | 8 | 33 | Akimasa Ishikawa | | |
| LDP | 2,256,845 (37.0%) | 8 | 34 | Asako Omi | | |
| LDP | 2,256,845 (37.0%) | 8 | 35 | Megumi Maekawa | | |
| CRA | 1,174,717 (19.3%) | 4 | 1 | Keiichi Ishii | | |
| CRA | 1,174,717 (19.3%) | 4 | 2 | Keiichi Koshimizu | | |
| CRA | 1,174,717 (19.3%) | 4 | 3 | Takahiro Fukushige | | |
| CRA | 1,174,717 (19.3%) | 4 | 4 | Atsushi Oshima | Saitama 6th | 89.5% |
| DPFP | 626,695 (10.3%) | 2 | 1 | Mikihiko Hashimoto | Saitama 13th | 91.4% |
| DPFP | 626,695 (10.3%) | 2 | 1 | Yoshihiro Suzuki | Saitama 14th | 90.8% |
| Sansei | 506,071 (8.3%) | 2 | 1 | Mayuko Toyota | | |
| Sansei | 506,071 (8.3%) | 2 | 2 | Hitomi Aoki | Gunma 4th | 42.2% |
| Mirai | 467,561 (7.7%) | 1 | 1 | Kazuko Muto | | |
| Ishin | 326,128 (5.3%) | 1 | 1 | Yuji Kashiwakura | Tochigi 1st | 48.3% |
| JCP | 254,497 (4.2%) | 1 | 1 | Tetsuya Shiokawa | | |

== Southern Kanto block ==
2026 Japanese general election in Southern Kanto
- 8 February 2026

All 59 seats to the House of Representatives
| | Majority party | Minority party | Third party |
|---|---|---|---|
| Party | LDP | CRA | DPP |
| Last election | 24 seats | 27 seats | 3 seats |
| Constituency | 35 | 1 | 0 |
| PR seats | 4 | 7 | 3 |
| Total | 39 | 8 | 3 |
| Seat change | ▲15 | ▼19 | 0 |
| | Fourth party | Fifth party | Sixth party |
| Party | Mirai | Sanseito | Ishin |
| Last election | New | 1 seat | 2 seats |
| Constituency | 0 | 0 | 0 |
| PR seats | 3 | 1 | 2 |
| Total | 3 | 2 | 2 |
| Seat change | ▲3 | ▲1 | 0 |
| | Seventh party | Eighth party |
| Party | JCP | Reiwa |
| Last election | 1 seat | 1 seat |
| Constituency | 0 | 0 |
| PR seats | 1 | 1 |
| Total | 1 | 1 |
| Seat change | 0 | 0 |

Single-member constituency results in Southern Kanto
| Constituency | Previous member | | Elected member | | Votes | % | Margin | Runner-up | | % | Status |
|---|---|---|---|---|---|---|---|---|---|---|---|
| Chiba 1st | Kaname Tajima | CRA | Hiroaki Kadoyama | LDP | 109,771 | 46.8 | 18,622 | Kaname Tajima | CRA | 38.9 | LDP gain from CRA |
| Chiba 2nd | Takayuki Kobayashi | LDP | Takayuki Kobayashi | LDP | 107,933 | 67.5 | 70,640 | Yumi Sato | CRA | 23.3 | LDP hold |
| Chiba 3rd | Hirokazu Matsuno | LDP | Hirokazu Matsuno | LDP | 86,687 | 52.0 | 37,998 | Kazumasa Okajima | CRA | 29.2 | LDP hold |
| Chiba 4th | Hideyuki Mizunuma | CRA | Yusuke Kashima | LDP | 106,236 | 48.2 | 34,538 | Hideyuki Mizunuma | CRA | 32.5 | LDP gain from CRA |
| Chiba 5th | Kentaro Yazaki | CRA | Arfiya Eri | LDP | 85,073 | 36.5 | 31,541 | Junko Okano | DPFP | 22.9 | LDP gain from CRA |
| Chiba 6th | Junko Ando | CRA | Hiromichi Watanabe | LDP | 89,662 | 40.5 | 31,227 | Junko Ando | CRA | 26.4 | LDP gain from CRA |
| Chiba 7th | Ken Saitō | LDP | Ken Saitō | LDP | 100,339 | 64.0 | 60,038 | Akihiro Hayashida | DPFP | 25.7 | LDP hold |
| Chiba 8th | Satoshi Honjō | CRA | Izumi Matsumoto | LDP | 95,279 | 49.1 | 32,495 | Satoshi Honjō | CRA | 32.3 | LDP gain from CRA |
| Chiba 9th | Soichiro Okuno | CRA | Hisato Tamiya | LDP | 89,146 | 44.2 | 19,702 | Soichiro Okuno | CRA | 34.4 | LDP gain from CRA |
| Chiba 10th | Masaaki Koike | LDP | Masaaki Koike | LDP | 95,358 | 61.1 | 44,402 | Hajime Yatagawa | CRA | 32.6 | LDP hold |
| Chiba 11th | Eisuke Mori | LDP | Eisuke Mori | LDP | 102,843 | 61.5 | 52,282 | Ryo Tagaya | CRA | 30.2 | LDP hold |
| Chiba 12th | Yasukazu Hamada | LDP | Yasukazu Hamada | LDP | 129,997 | 71.5 | 95,727 | Yuya Oosuki | Ind. | 18.8 | LDP hold |
| Chiba 13th | Hisashi Matsumoto | LDP | Hisashi Matsumoto | LDP | 121,796 | 53.9 | 49,562 | Shin Miyakawa | CRA | 31.9 | LDP hold |
| Chiba 14th | Yoshihiko Noda | CRA | Yoshihiko Noda | CRA | 99,324 | 45.0 | 13,263 | Harunobu Nagano | LDP | 39.0 | CRA hold |
| Kanagawa 1st | Go Shinohara | CRA | Natsuko Maruo | LDP | 121,899 | 53.1 | 41,786 | Go Shinohara | CRA | 34.9 | LDP gain from CRA |
| Kanagawa 2nd | Yoshihide Suga | LDP | Shōbun Nitta | LDP | 112,930 | 47.9 | 66,983 | Chie Katayama | DPFP | 19.5 | LDP hold |
| Kanagawa 3rd | Kenji Nakanishi | LDP | Kenji Nakanishi | LDP | 114,485 | 47.7 | 66,025 | Taketo Nakamura | CRA | 20.2 | LDP hold |
| Kanagawa 4th | Yuki Waseda | CRA | Marina Nagata | LDP | 93,954 | 47.6 | 11,015 | Yuki Waseda | CRA | 42.0 | LDP gain from CRA |
| Kanagawa 5th | Manabu Sakai | LDP | Manabu Sakai | LDP | 99,726 | 49.7 | 46,133 | Makoto Yamazaki | CRA | 26.7 | LDP hold |
| Kanagawa 6th | Yoichiro Aoyagi | CRA | Naoki Furukawa | LDP | 120,667 | 60.7 | 42,411 | Yoichiro Aoyagi | CRA | 39.3 | LDP gain from CRA |
| Kanagawa 7th | Kazuma Nakatani | CRA | Keisuke Suzuki | LDP | 107,464 | 62.1 | 41,940 | Kazuma Nakatani | CRA | 37.9 | LDP gain from CRA |
| Kanagawa 8th | Kenji Eda | CRA | Hidehiro Mitani | LDP | 140,717 | 59.0 | 43,046 | Kenji Eda | CRA | 41.0 | LDP gain from CRA |
| Kanagawa 9th | Hirofumi Ryu | CRA | Masahiro Uehara | LDP | 87,531 | 46.6 | 3,507 | Hirofumi Ryu | CRA | 44.8 | LDP gain from CRA |
| Kanagawa 10th | Kazunori Tanaka | LDP | Kazunori Tanaka | LDP | 59,967 | 36.1 | 19,669 | Ryuna Kanemura | Ishin | 24.2 | LDP hold |
| Kanagawa 11th | Shinjirō Koizumi | LDP | Shinjirō Koizumi | LDP | 149,029 | 79.5 | 129,730 | Minoru Tamesou | JCP | 10.3 | LDP hold |
| Kanagawa 12th | Tomoko Abe | CRA | Tsuyoshi Hoshino | LDP | 108,343 | 49.4 | 29,550 | Tomoko Abe | CRA | 35.9 | LDP gain from CRA |
| Kanagawa 13th | Hideshi Futori | CRA | Koichiro Maruta | LDP | 95,453 | 48.6 | 17,461 | Hideshi Futori | CRA | 39.7 | LDP gain from CRA |
| Kanagawa 14th | Jiro Akama | LDP | Jiro Akama | LDP | 108,352 | 52.5 | 46,632 | Yoshihiro Nagatomo | CRA | 29.9 | LDP hold |
| Kanagawa 15th | Taro Kono | LDP | Taro Kono | LDP | 141,580 | 62.5 | 102,033 | Yoshimitsu Koyama | Sansei | 17.5 | LDP hold |
| Kanagawa 16th | Yuichi Goto | CRA | Masashi Sato | LDP | 105,984 | 52.9 | 11,520 | Yuichi Goto | CRA | 47.1 | LDP gain from CRA |
| Kanagawa 17th | Karen Makishima | LDP | Karen Makishima | LDP | 106,966 | 48.4 | 38,608 | Naomi Sasaki | CRA | 30.9 | LDP hold |
| Kanagawa 18th | Hajime Sono | CRA | Daishiro Yamagiwa | LDP | 76,615 | 32.4 | 24,541 | Hajime Souno | CRA | 22.0 | LDP gain from CRA |
| Kanagawa 19th | Tsuyoshi Kusama | LDP | Tsuyoshi Kusama | LDP | 83,450 | 40.7 | 6,079 | Jesús Fukasaku | DPFP | 37.7 | LDP hold |
| Kanagawa 20th | Sayuri Otsuka | CRA | Yui Kanazawa | LDP | 91,240 | 49.5 | 24,276 | Sayuri Otsuka | CRA | 36.3 | LDP gain from CRA |
| Yamanashi 1st | Katsuhito Nakajima | CRA | Shinichi Nakatani | LDP | 128,168 | 52.3 | 40,356 | Katsuhito Nakajima | CRA | 35.9 | LDP gain from CRA |
| Yamanashi 2nd | Noriko Horiuchi | LDP | Noriko Horiuchi | LDP | 108,477 | 81.5 | 83,887 | Norifumi Souda | JCP | 18.5 | LDP hold |

Proportional representation results
| Party | Votes | Seats | Rank | Elected member | Constituency | Ratio |
|---|---|---|---|---|---|---|
| LDP | 2,637,938 (35.6%) | 10 → 4 (Note: Forfeited six seats due to lack of candidates.) | 1 | Harunobu Nagano | Chiba 14th | 86.6% |
| LDP | 2,637,938 (35.6%) | 10 → 4 | 33 | Satoshi Ito | | |
| LDP | 2,637,938 (35.6%) | 10 → 4 | 34 | Ryo Fuzuki | | |
| LDP | 2,637,938 (35.6%) | 10 → 4 | 35 | Hina Iwasaki | | |
| CRA | 1,424,763 (19.2%) | 5 → 7 | 1 | Hideo Tsunoda | | |
| CRA | 1,424,763 (19.2%) | 5 → 7 | 2 | Mitsuko Numazaki | | |
| CRA | 1,424,763 (19.2%) | 5 → 7 | 3 | Naoki Harada | | |
| CRA | 1,424,763 (19.2%) | 5 → 7 | 4 | Hirofumi Ryu | Kanagawa 9th | 95.9% |
| CRA | 1,424,763 (19.2%) | 5 → 7 | 4 | Yuichi Goto | Kanagawa 16th | 89.1% |
| CRA | 1,424,763 (19.2%) | 5 → 7 | 4 | Yuki Waseda | Kanagawa 4th | 88.2% |
| CRA | 1,424,763 (19.2%) | 5 → 7 | 4 | Kaname Tajima | Chiba 1st | 83.0% |
| DPFP | 788,564 (10.6%) | 2 → 3 | 1 | Jesús Fukasaku | Kanagawa 19th | 92.7% |
| DPFP | 788,564 (10.6%) | 2 → 3 | 1 | Yoshitaka Nishioka | Kanagawa 18th | 65.0% |
| DPFP | 788,564 (10.6%) | 2 → 3 | 1 | Junko Okano | Chiba 5th | 62.9% |
| Mirai | 682,469 (9.2%) | 2 → 3 | 1 | Michio Kawai | | |
| Mirai | 682,469 (9.2%) | 2 → 3 | 2 | Eri Yamada | | |
| Mirai | 682,469 (9.2%) | 2 → 3 | 3 | Shuhei Kobayashi | Chiba 5th | 29.8% |
| Sansei | 531,288 (7.2%) | 2 | 1 | Megu Nakaya | Chiba 13th | 26.3% |
| Sansei | 531,288 (7.2%) | 2 | 1 | Seiko Kudo | Chiba 4th | 23.3% |
| Ishin | 463,287 (6.2%) | 1 → 2 | 1 | Ryuna Kanemura | Kanagawa 10th | 67.2% |
| Ishin | 463,287 (6.2%) | 1 → 2 | 1 | Mitsuhiro Yokota | Kanagawa 18th | 34.4% |
| JCP | 314,224 (4.2%) | 1 | 1 | Kimie Hatano | | |
| Reiwa | 202,655 (2.7%) | 0 → 1 | 2 | Joji Yamamoto | | |

== Tokyo block ==
2026 Japanese general election in Tokyo
- 8 February 2026

All 49 seats to the House of Representatives
| | Majority party | Minority party | Third party |
|---|---|---|---|
| Party | LDP | CRA | Mirai |
| Last election | 16 seats | 23 seats | New |
| Constituency | 30 | 0 | 0 |
| PR seats | 3 | 5 | 4 |
| Total | 33 | 5 | 4 |
| Seat change | ▲17 | ▼18 | ▲4 |
| | Fourth party | Fifth party | Sixth party |
| Party | DPP | Sanseito | JCP |
| Last election | 3 seats | 0 seats | 1 seat |
| Constituency | 0 | 0 | 0 |
| PR seats | 3 | 2 | 1 |
| Total | 3 | 2 | 1 |
| Seat change | 0 | ▲2 | 0 |
| | Seventh party |
| Party | Ishin |
| Last election | 2 seats |
| Constituency | 0 |
| PR seats | 1 |
| Total | 1 |
| Seat change | ▼1 |

Single-member constituency results in Tokyo
| Constituency | Previous member | | Elected member | | Votes | % | Margin | Runner-up | | % | Status |
|---|---|---|---|---|---|---|---|---|---|---|---|
| Tokyo 1st | Banri Kaieda | CRA | Miki Yamada | LDP | 82,622 | 43.0 | 33,792 | Banri Kaieda | CRA | 25.4 | LDP gain from CRA |
| Tokyo 2nd | Kiyoto Tsuji | LDP | Kiyoto Tsuji | LDP | 84,690 | 43.3 | 48,669 | Kiichirō Hatoyama | DPFP | 18.4 | LDP hold |
| Tokyo 3rd | Hirotaka Ishihara | LDP | Hirotaka Ishihara | LDP | 93,158 | 42.6 | 39,574 | Yumiko Abe | CRA | 24.5 | LDP hold |
| Tokyo 4th | Masaaki Taira | LDP | Masaaki Taira | LDP | 114,054 | 49.4 | 58,444 | Masae Ido | DPFP | 24.1 | LDP hold |
| Tokyo 5th | Yoshio Tezuka | CRA | Kenji Wakamiya | LDP | 89,078 | 39.1 | 30,914 | Yoshio Tezuka | CRA | 25.5 | LDP gain from CRA |
| Tokyo 6th | Takayuki Ochiai | CRA | Shōgo Azemoto | LDP | 90,077 | 37.7 | 10,815 | Takayuki Ochiai | CRA | 33.2 | LDP gain from CRA |
| Tokyo 7th | Akihiro Matsuo | CRA | Tamayo Marukawa | LDP | 80,421 | 34.5 | 27,845 | Akihiro Matsuo | CRA | 22.5 | LDP gain from CRA |
| Tokyo 8th | Harumi Yoshida | CRA | Hiroko Kado | LDP | 108,020 | 44.3 | 30,400 | Harumi Yoshida | CRA | 31.8 | LDP gain from CRA |
| Tokyo 9th | Issei Yamagishi | CRA | Isshu Sugawara | LDP | 78,927 | 43.0 | 22,752 | Issei Yamagishi | CRA | 30.6 | LDP gain from CRA |
| Tokyo 10th | Hayato Suzuki | LDP | Hayato Suzuki | LDP | 126,044 | 49.1 | 58,469 | Yosuke Suzuki | CRA | 26.3 | LDP hold |
| Tokyo 11th | Yukihiko Akutsu | CRA | Hakubun Shimomura | LDP | 69,077 | 31.5 | 16,076 | Yukihiko Akutsu | CRA | 24.2 | LDP gain from CRA |
| Tokyo 12th | Kei Takagi | LDP | Kei Takagi | LDP | 78,774 | 35.0 | 34,640 | Shota Nakahara | CRA | 19.6 | LDP hold |
| Tokyo 13th | Shin Tsuchida | LDP | Shin Tsuchida | LDP | 94,680 | 46.6 | 28,540 | Yosuke Mori | DPFP | 32.5 | LDP hold |
| Tokyo 14th | Midori Matsushima | LDP | Midori Matsushima | LDP | 109,892 | 50.2 | 60,580 | Takanori Chonan | DPFP | 22.5 | LDP hold |
| Tokyo 15th | Natsumi Sakai | CRA | Kōki Ōzora | LDP | 109,489 | 42.5 | 38,578 | Natsumi Sakai | CRA | 27.5 | LDP gain from CRA |
| Tokyo 16th | Yohei Onishi | LDP | Yohei Onishi | LDP | 92,858 | 44.6 | 41,331 | Katsuyuki Shibata | CRA | 24.8 | LDP hold |
| Tokyo 17th | Katsuei Hirasawa | LDP | Katsuei Hirasawa | LDP | 73,234 | 36.2 | 28,640 | Mari Sorita | CRA | 22.0 | LDP hold |
| Tokyo 18th | Kaoru Fukuda | LDP | Kaoru Fukuda | LDP | 117,383 | 47.7 | 47,661 | Reiko Matsushita | CRA | 28.3 | LDP hold |
| Tokyo 19th | Yoshinori Suematsu | CRA | Yohei Matsumoto | LDP | 93,697 | 45.9 | 39,352 | Yoshinori Suematsu | CRA | 26.6 | LDP gain from CRA |
| Tokyo 20th | Seiji Kihara | LDP | Seiji Kihara | LDP | 108,985 | 48.6 | 62,075 | Kentaro Onishi | DPFP | 20.9 | LDP hold |
| Tokyo 21st | Masako Ōkawara | CRA | Kiyoshi Odawara | LDP | 97,494 | 42.6 | 31,781 | Retsu Suzuki | CRA | 28.7 | LDP gain from CRA |
| Tokyo 22nd | Ikuo Yamahana | CRA | Tatsuya Ito | LDP | 132,689 | 51.5 | 45,195 | Ikuo Yamahana | CRA | 33.9 | LDP gain from CRA |
| Tokyo 23rd | Shunsuke Ito | CRA | Shinichiro Kawamatsu | LDP | 92,171 | 45.3 | 22,263 | Shunsuke Ito | CRA | 34.4 | LDP gain from CRA |
| Tokyo 24th | Kōichi Hagiuda | LDP | Kōichi Hagiuda | LDP | 85,806 | 41.1 | 15,025 | Yu Hosogai | CRA | 33.9 | LDP hold |
| Tokyo 25th | Shinji Inoue | LDP | Shinji Inoue | LDP | 109,606 | 50.5 | 59,387 | Karen Yoda | CRA | 23.1 | LDP hold |
| Tokyo 26th | Jin Matsubara | Ind. | Ueki Imaoka | LDP | 92,329 | 34.7 | 10,210 | Jin Matsubara | Ind. | 30.8 | LDP gain from Ind. |
| Tokyo 27th | Akira Nagatsuma | CRA | Yuichi Kurosaki | LDP | 85,249 | 38.1 | 4,252 | Akira Nagatsuma | CRA | 36.2 | LDP gain from CRA |
| Tokyo 28th | Satoshi Takamatsu | CRA | Takao Ando | LDP | 69,037 | 36.6 | 27,555 | Satoshi Takamatsu | CRA | 22.0 | LDP gain from CRA |
| Tokyo 29th | Mitsunari Okamoto | CRA | Kosuke Nagasawa | LDP | 80,538 | 41.4 | 35,180 | Taketsuka Kimura | CRA | 23.3 | LDP gain from CRA |
| Tokyo 30th | Eri Igarashi | CRA | Akihisa Nagashima | LDP | 110,453 | 45.2 | 29,371 | Eri Igarashi | CRA | 33.1 | LDP gain from CRA |

Proportional representation results
| Party | Votes | Seats | Rank | Elected member | Constituency | Ratio |
|---|---|---|---|---|---|---|
| LDP | 2,243,625 (33.1%) | 8 → 3 (Note: Forfeited five seats due to lack of candidates.) | 30 | Masashi Tanaka | | |
| LDP | 2,243,625 (33.1%) | 8 → 3 | 31 | Yuko Tsuji | | |
| LDP | 2,243,625 (33.1%) | 8 → 3 | 32 | Kiyoko Morihara | | |
| CRA | 1,119,155 (16.5%) | 3 → 5 | 1 | Mitsunari Okamoto | | |
| CRA | 1,119,155 (16.5%) | 3 → 5 | 2 | Koichi Kasai | | |
| CRA | 1,119,155 (16.5%) | 3 → 5 | 3 | Eriko Omori | | |
| CRA | 1,119,155 (16.5%) | 3 → 5 | 4 | Akira Nagatsuma | Tokyo 27th | 95.0% |
| CRA | 1,119,155 (16.5%) | 3 → 5 | 4 | Takayuki Ochiai | Tokyo 6th | 87.9% |
| Mirai | 887,849 (13.1%) | 3 → 4 | 1 | Satoshi Takayama | | |
| Mirai | 887,849 (13.1%) | 3 → 4 | 2 | Yuya Mineshima | Tokyo 7th | 53.8% |
| Mirai | 887,849 (13.1%) | 3 → 4 | 3 | Noboru Usami | Tokyo 26th | 37.5% |
| Mirai | 887,849 (13.1%) | 3 → 4 | 4 | Akihiro Dobashi | Tokyo 2nd | 29.5% |
| DPFP | 746,660 (11.0%) | 2 → 3 | 1 | Yosuke Mori | Tokyo 13th | 69.8% |
| DPFP | 746,660 (11.0%) | 2 → 3 | 1 | Kazumoto Takazawa | Tokyo 11th | 55.6% |
| DPFP | 746,660 (11.0%) | 2 → 3 | 1 | Masae Ido | Tokyo 4th | 48.7% |
| Sansei | 427,028 (6.3%) | 1 → 2 | 1 | Rina Yoshikawa | Tokyo 1st | 30.5% |
| Sansei | 427,028 (6.3%) | 1 → 2 | 2 | Mika Suzuki | Tokyo 22nd | 28.4% |
| JCP | 407,146 (6.0%) | 1 | 1 | Tomoko Tamura | | |
| Ishin | 384,487 (5.7%) | 1 | 1 | Tsukasa Abe | Tokyo 12th | 42.0% |

== Hokuriku-Shin'etsu block ==
2026 Japanese general election in Hokuriku-Shin'etsu block
- 8 February 2026

All 28 seats to the House of Representatives
| | Majority party | Minority party | Third party |
|---|---|---|---|
| Party | LDP | CRA | DPP |
| Last election | 12 seats | 14 seats | 1 seat |
| Constituency | 18 | 0 | 0 |
| PR seats | 3 | 4 | 1 |
| Total | 21 | 4 | 1 |
| Seat change | ▲9 | ▼10 | 0 |
| | Fourth party | Fifth party |
| Party | Sanseito | Ishin |
| Last election | 0 seats | 1 seat |
| Constituency | 0 | 0 |
| PR seats | 1 | 1 |
| Total | 1 | 1 |
| Seat change | ▲1 | 0 |

Single-member constituency results in Hokuriku-Shin'etsu
| Constituency | Previous member | | Elected member | | Votes | % | Margin | Runner-up | | % | Status |
|---|---|---|---|---|---|---|---|---|---|---|---|
| Niigata 1st | Chinami Nishimura | CRA | Kou Uchiyama | LDP | 92,578 | 46.8 | 19,411 | Chinami Nishimura | CRA | 37.0 | LDP gain from CRA |
| Niigata 2nd | Makiko Kikuta | CRA | Isato Kunisada | LDP | 111,803 | 49.0 | 26,201 | Makiko Kikuta | CRA | 37.5 | LDP gain from CRA |
| Niigata 3rd | Takahiro Kuroiwa | CRA | Hiroaki Saito | LDP | 115,991 | 54.6 | 39,539 | Takahiro Kuroiwa | CRA | 36.0 | LDP gain from CRA |
| Niigata 4th | Ryuichi Yoneyama | CRA | Eiichiro Washio | LDP | 107,128 | 53.6 | 44,682 | Ryuichi Yoneyama | CRA | 31.2 | LDP gain from CRA |
| Niigata 5th | Mamoru Umetani | CRA | Shuichi Takatori | LDP | 104,206 | 52.1 | 24,912 | Mamoru Umetani | CRA | 39.6 | LDP gain from CRA |
| Toyama 1st | Hiroaki Tabata | LDP | Hiroshi Nakada | LDP | 81,875 | 63.4 | 54,145 | Toshihiro Yama | CRA | 21.5 | LDP hold |
| Toyama 2nd | Eishun Ueda | LDP | Eishun Ueda | LDP | 88,839 | 74.7 | 58,735 | Yasuharu Koshikawa | CRA | 25.3 | LDP hold |
| Toyama 3rd | Keiichiro Tachibana | LDP | Keiichiro Tachibana | LDP | 126,981 | 65.9 | 91,405 | Keita Yamamoto | DPFP | 18.5 | LDP hold |
| Ishikawa 1st | Takuo Komori | LDP | Takuo Komori | LDP | 83,732 | 45.0 | 35,582 | Kai Odake | DPFP | 25.9 | LDP hold |
| Ishikawa 2nd | Hajime Sasaki | LDP | Hajime Sasaki | LDP | 139,808 | 83.6 | 112,332 | Hiroshi Sakamoto | JCP | 16.4 | LDP hold |
| Ishikawa 3rd | Kazuya Kondo | CRA | Shoji Nishida | LDP | 73,034 | 51.9 | 8,141 | Kazuya Kondo | CRA | 46.1 | LDP gain from CRA |
| Fukui 1st | Tomomi Inada | LDP | Tomomi Inada | LDP | 93,292 | 48.1 | 54,363 | Tsubasa Hatano | CRA | 20.1 | LDP hold |
| Fukui 2nd | Hideyuki Tsuji | CRA | Takeshi Saiki | LDP | 78,737 | 59.9 | 26,130 | Hideyuki Tsuji | CRA | 40.1 | LDP gain from CRA |
| Nagano 1st | Takashi Shinohara | CRA | Kenta Wakabayashi | LDP | 119,101 | 50.7 | 32,643 | Takashi Shinohara | CRA | 36.8 | LDP gain from CRA |
| Nagano 2nd | Mitsu Shimojo | CRA | Hikaru Fujita | LDP | 104,107 | 46.7 | 28,298 | Mitsu Shimojo | CRA | 34.0 | LDP gain from CRA |
| Nagano 3rd | Takeshi Kōzu | CRA | Yosei Ide | LDP | 111,844 | 48.3 | 29,922 | Takeshi Kōzu | CRA | 35.4 | LDP gain from CRA |
| Nagano 4th | Shigeyuki Goto | LDP | Shigeyuki Goto | LDP | 77,135 | 57.6 | 43,013 | Akihisa Hanaoka | DPFP | 25.5 | LDP hold |
| Nagano 5th | Ichiro Miyashita | LDP | Ichiro Miyashita | LDP | 98,866 | 59.8 | 32,273 | Junta Fukuda | CRA | 40.2 | LDP hold |

Proportional representation results
| Party | Votes | Seats | Rank | Elected member | Constituency | Ratio |
|---|---|---|---|---|---|---|
| LDP | 1,387,716 (42.1%) | 5 → 3 (Note: Forfeited two seats due to lack of candidates.) | 12 | Hiroaki Tabata | | |
| LDP | 1,387,716 (42.1%) | 5 → 3 | 19 | Kon Yosuke | | |
| LDP | 1,387,716 (42.1%) | 5 → 3 | 20 | Kosuke Furui | | |
| CRA | 651,331 (19.8%) | 2 → 4 | 1 | Hiromasa Nakagawa | | |
| CRA | 651,331 (19.8%) | 2 → 4 | 2 | Kazuya Kondo | Ishikawa 3rd | 88.8% |
| CRA | 651,331 (19.8%) | 2 → 4 | 2 | Chinami Nishimura | Niigata 1st | 79.0% |
| CRA | 651,331 (19.8%) | 2 → 4 | 2 | Makiko Kikuta | Niigata 2nd | 76.5% |
| DPFP | 322,739 (9.8%) | 1 | 1 | Kai Odake | Ishikawa 1st | 57.5% |
| Sansei | 285,897 (8.7%) | 1 | 1 | Yuichiro Kawa | Ishikawa 1st | 27.8% |
| Ishin | 231,686 (7.0%) | 1 | 1 | Kiyoshi Wakasa | Nagano 1st | 24.6% |

== Tokai block ==
2026 Japanese general election in Tokai
- 8 February 2026

All 54 seats to the House of Representatives
| | Majority party | Minority party | Third party |
|---|---|---|---|
| Party | LDP | DPP | CRA |
| Last election | 20 seats | 6 seats | 22 seats |
| Constituency | 29 | 3 | 0 |
| PR seats | 10 | 3 | 4 |
| Total | 39 | 6 | 4 |
| Seat change | ▲19 | 0 | ▼18 |
| | Fourth party | Fifth party | Sixth party |
| Party | Sanseito | Mirai | Ishin |
| Last election | 0 seats | New | 1 seat |
| Constituency | 0 | 0 | 0 |
| PR seats | 2 | 1 | 1 |
| Total | 2 | 1 | 1 |
| Seat change | ▲2 | ▲1 | 0 |
| | Seventh party |
| Party | Genyu |
| Last election | New |
| Constituency | 1 |
| PR seats | 0 |
| Total | 1 |
| Seat change | ▲1 |

Single-member constituency results in Tokai
| Constituency | Previous member | | Elected member | | Votes | % | Margin | Runner-up | | % | Status |
|---|---|---|---|---|---|---|---|---|---|---|---|
| Gifu 1st | Seiko Noda | LDP | Seiko Noda | LDP | 90,249 | 55.8 | 53,592 | Manabu Hattori | CRA | 22.7 | LDP hold |
| Gifu 2nd | Yasufumi Tanahashi | LDP | Yasufumi Tanahashi | LDP | 87,826 | 54.6 | 43,147 | Miho Nomura | DPFP | 27.8 | LDP hold |
| Gifu 3rd | Yoji Muto | LDP | Yoji Muto | LDP | 118,346 | 53.4 | 67,325 | Akihiro Senda | DPFP | 23.0 | LDP hold |
| Gifu 4th | Masato Imai | CRA | Tomohiro Kato | LDP | 103,054 | 50.7 | 23,578 | Masato Imai | CRA | 39.1 | LDP gain from CRA |
| Gifu 5th | Keiji Furuya | LDP | Keiji Furuya | LDP | 83,214 | 52.1 | 45,584 | Satoshi Mano | CRA | 23.6 | LDP hold |
| Shizuoka 1st | Yōko Kamikawa | LDP | Yōko Kamikawa | LDP | 127,488 | 61.1 | 65,998 | Shohei Shibata | DPFP | 29.5 | LDP hold |
| Shizuoka 2nd | Tatsunori Ibayashi | LDP | Tatsunori Ibayashi | LDP | 152,012 | 71.1 | 90,097 | Takeyuki Suzuki | CRA | 28.9 | LDP hold |
| Shizuoka 3rd | Nobuhiro Koyama | CRA | Yuzo Yamamoto | LDP | 117,738 | 51.8 | 41,229 | Nobuhiro Koyama | CRA | 33.6 | LDP gain from CRA |
| Shizuoka 4th | Ken Tanaka | DPFP | Yoichi Fukazawa | LDP | 87,880 | 51.7 | 26,089 | Ken Tanaka | DPFP | 36.4 | LDP gain from DPFP |
| Shizuoka 5th | Goshi Hosono | LDP | Goshi Hosono | LDP | 168,511 | 74.8 | 125,094 | Masayoshi Nakamura | CRA | 19.3 | LDP hold |
| Shizuoka 6th | Shu Watanabe | CRA | Takaaki Katsumata | LDP | 125,829 | 54.6 | 41,103 | Shu Watanabe | CRA | 36.8 | LDP gain from CRA |
| Shizuoka 7th | Minoru Kiuchi | LDP | Minoru Kiuchi | LDP | 129,336 | 67.7 | 83,847 | Fukuko Kitanoya | DPFP | 23.8 | LDP hold |
| Shizuoka 8th | Kentaro Genma | CRA | Daisuke Inaba | LDP | 114,256 | 50.0 | 31,899 | Kentaro Genma | CRA | 36.0 | LDP gain from CRA |
| Aichi 1st | Takashi Kawamura | Genyu | Takashi Kawamura | Genyu | 94,339 | 42.5 | 22,195 | Hiromichi Kumada | LDP | 32.5 | Genyu hold |
| Aichi 2nd | Motohisa Furukawa | DPFP | Motohisa Furukawa | DPFP | 110,540 | 49.1 | 35,695 | Tsuji Hideki | LDP | 33.3 | DPFP hold |
| Aichi 3rd | Shoichi Kondo | CRA | Yoshihiko Mizuno | LDP | 98,388 | 40.8 | 27,924 | Shoichi Kondo | CRA | 40.8 | LDP gain from CRA |
| Aichi 4th | Yoshio Maki | CRA | Shozo Kudo | LDP | 79,204 | 41.7 | 28,632 | Yoshio Maki | CRA | 26.6 | LDP gain from CRA |
| Aichi 5th | Atsushi Nishikawa | CRA | Yasuhiro Okamoto | LDP | 73,643 | 41.7 | 29,355 | Atsushi Nishikawa | CRA | 25.1 | LDP gain from CRA |
| Aichi 6th | Hideki Niwa | LDP | Hideki Niwa | LDP | 109,044 | 54.1 | 69,216 | Nobue Kunizaki | CRA | 19.7 | LDP hold |
| Aichi 7th | Saria Hino | DPFP | Saria Hino | DPFP | 108,322 | 49.8 | 13,349 | Junji Suzuki | LDP | 43.6 | DPFP hold |
| Aichi 8th | Yutaka Banno | CRA | Tadahiko Ito | LDP | 131,050 | 52.8 | 46,479 | Yutaka Banno | CRA | 34.1 | LDP gain from CRA |
| Aichi 9th | Mitsunori Okamoto | CRA | Yasumasa Nagasaka | LDP | 93,351 | 45.1 | 35,267 | Mitsunori Okamoto | CRA | 28.1 | LDP gain from CRA |
| Aichi 10th | Norimasa Fujiwara | CRA | Shinji Wakayama | LDP | 80,646 | 42.1 | 37,150 | Norimasa Fujiwara | CRA | 22.7 | LDP gain from CRA |
| Aichi 11th | Midori Tanno | DPFP | Midori Tanno | DPFP | 145,739 | 59.7 | 47,328 | Tadamori Fujisawa | LDP | 40.3 | DPFP hold |
| Aichi 12th | Kazuhiko Shigetoku | CRA | Shuhei Aoyama | LDP | 128,453 | 47.0 | 21,323 | Kazuhiko Shigetoku | CRA | 39.2 | LDP gain from CRA |
| Aichi 13th | Kensuke Onishi | CRA | Taku Ishii | LDP | 151,944 | 58.6 | 57,545 | Kensuke Onishi | CRA | 36.4 | LDP gain from CRA |
| Aichi 14th | Soichiro Imaeda | LDP | Soichiro Imaeda | LDP | 119,376 | 67.4 | 69,623 | Rie Otake | CRA | 28.1 | LDP hold |
| Aichi 15th | Yukinori Nemoto | LDP | Yukinori Nemoto | LDP | 88,028 | 43.6 | 51,414 | Chiho Koyama | CRA | 18.1 | LDP hold |
| Aichi 16th | Toru Fukuta | DPFP | Shizuo Yamashita | LDP | 91,375 | 40.9 | 31,291 | Toru Fukuta | DPFP | 26.9 | LDP gain from DPFP |
| Mie 1st | Norihisa Tamura | LDP | Norihisa Tamura | LDP | 124,762 | 66.3 | 71,742 | Wakako Fukumori | CRA | 28.2 | LDP hold |
| Mie 2nd | Kosuke Shimono | CRA | Hideto Kawasaki | LDP | 117,495 | 52.5 | 39,377 | Kosuke Shimono | CRA | 34.9 | LDP gain from CRA |
| Mie 3rd | Katsuya Okada | CRA | Masataka Ishihara | LDP | 99,392 | 42.1 | 8,691 | Katsuya Okada | CRA | 38.4 | LDP gain from CRA |
| Mie 4th | Eikei Suzuki | LDP | Eikei Suzuki | LDP | 106,718 | 66.5 | 63,702 | Daisuke Fujita | DPFP | 26.8 | LDP hold |

Proportional representation results
| Party | Votes | Seats | Rank | Elected member | Constituency | Ratio |
|---|---|---|---|---|---|---|
| LDP | 2,628,008 (37.7%) | 10 | 1 | Sakon Yamamoto | | |
| LDP | 2,628,008 (37.7%) | 10 | 2 | Junji Suzuki | Aichi 7th | 87.6% |
| LDP | 2,628,008 (37.7%) | 10 | 2 | Hiromichi Kumada | Aichi 1st | 76.4% |
| LDP | 2,628,008 (37.7%) | 10 | 2 | Tsuji Hideki | Aichi 2nd | 67.7% |
| LDP | 2,628,008 (37.7%) | 10 | 2 | Tadamori Fujisawa | Aichi 11th | 67.5% |
| LDP | 2,628,008 (37.7%) | 10 | 34 | Kenichi Hosoda | | |
| LDP | 2,628,008 (37.7%) | 10 | 35 | Nakagawa Takamoto | | |
| LDP | 2,628,008 (37.7%) | 10 | 36 | Rie Saito | | |
| LDP | 2,628,008 (37.7%) | 10 | 37 | Koichiro Osada | | |
| LDP | 2,628,008 (37.7%) | 10 | 38 | Seko Mamiko | | |
| CRA | 1,199,580 (17.2%) | 4 | 1 | Yasuhiro Nakagawa | | |
| CRA | 1,199,580 (17.2%) | 4 | 2 | Katsuhide Nishizono | | |
| CRA | 1,199,580 (17.2%) | 4 | 3 | Kiyoshi Inukai | | |
| CRA | 1,199,580 (17.2%) | 4 | 4 | Kazuhiko Shigetoku | Aichi 12th | 83.4% |
| DPFP | 836,102 (12.0%) | 3 | 1 | Ken Tanaka | Shizuoka 4th | 70.3% |
| DPFP | 836,102 (12.0%) | 3 | 1 | Toru Fukuta | Aichi 16th | 65.7% |
| DPFP | 836,102 (12.0%) | 3 | 1 | Miho Nomura | Gifu 2nd | 50.8% |
| Sansei | 527,291 (7.6%) | 2 | 1 | Airi Watanabe | Aichi 5th | 25.7% |
| Sansei | 527,291 (7.6%) | 2 | 1 | Ito Keisuke | Gifu 3rd | 19.6% |
| Mirai | 478,316 (6.9%) | 1 | 1 | Suda Eitaro | | |
| Ishin | 400,964 (5.7%) | 1 | 1 | Kenichiro Seki | Aichi 15th | 40.5% |

== Kinki block ==
2026 Japanese general election in Kinki
- 8 February 2026

All 73 seats to the House of Representatives
| | Majority party | Minority party | Third party |
|---|---|---|---|
| Party | LDP | Ishin | CRA |
| Last election | 20 seats | 28 seats | 14 seats |
| Constituency | 23 | 20 | 1 |
| PR seats | 10 | 8 | 5 |
| Total | 33 | 28 | 6 |
| Seat change | ▲13 | 0 | ▼8 |
| | Fourth party | Fifth party | Sixth party |
| Party | DPP | Sanseito | JCP |
| Last election | 2 seats | 1 seat | 2 seats |
| Constituency | 0 | 0 | 0 |
| PR seats | 2 | 2 | 1 |
| Total | 2 | 2 | 1 |
| Seat change | 0 | ▲1 | ▼1 |

Single-member constituency results in Kinki
| Constituency | Previous member | | Elected member | | Votes | % | Margin | Runner-up | | % | Status |
|---|---|---|---|---|---|---|---|---|---|---|---|
| Shiga 1st | Alex Saito | Ishin | Toshitaka Ōoka | LDP | 76,367 | 42.0 | 29,150 | Alex Saito | Ishin | 26.0 | LDP gain from Ishin |
| Shiga 2nd | Kenichiro Ueno | LDP | Kenichiro Ueno | LDP | 141,853 | 60.1 | 94,721 | Michio Hirao | CRA | 20.0 | LDP hold |
| Shiga 3rd | Nobuhide Takemura | LDP | Nobuhide Takemura | LDP | 108,917 | 48.6 | 71,933 | Shingo Deji | Ishin | 16.5 | LDP hold |
| Kyoto 1st | Yasushi Katsume | LDP | Yasushi Katsume | LDP | 78,098 | 37.0 | 49,199 | Kozo Hirotake | CRA | 13.7 | LDP hold |
| Kyoto 2nd | Seiji Maehara | Ishin | Seiji Maehara | Ishin | 49,415 | 35.7 | 12,524 | Yoji Fujita | LDP | 26.6 | Ishin hold |
| Kyoto 3rd | Kenta Izumi | CRA | Kenta Izumi | CRA | 68,533 | 36.6 | 6,127 | Mamoru Shigemoto | LDP | 33.4 | CRA hold |
| Kyoto 4th | Keiro Kitagami | LDP | Keiro Kitagami | LDP | 142,149 | 73.7 | 91,459 | Koichi Yoshida | JCP | 26.3 | LDP hold |
| Kyoto 5th | Taro Honda | LDP | Taro Honda | LDP | 84,865 | 77.0 | 59,502 | Ken Yamauchi | JCP | 23.0 | LDP hold |
| Kyoto 6th | Kazunori Yamanoi | CRA | Hiromichi Sonozaki | LDP | 124,175 | 47.9 | 32,253 | Kazunori Yamanoi | CRA | 35.4 | LDP gain from CRA |
| Osaka 1st | Inoue Hidetaka | Ishin | Inoue Hidetaka | Ishin | 93,383 | 40.2 | 28,900 | Hiroyuki Onishi | LDP | 27.8 | Ishin hold |
| Osaka 2nd | Tadashi Morishima | Ind. | Ryo Takami | Ishin | 115,244 | 51.9 | 74,572 | Tadashi Morishima | Ind. | 18.3 | Ishin gain from Ind. |
| Osaka 3rd | Toru Azuma | Ishin | Toru Azuma | Ishin | 75,462 | 40.4 | 29,747 | Akira Yanagimoto | LDP | 24.4 | Ishin hold |
| Osaka 4th | Teruo Minobe | Ishin | Teruo Minobe | Ishin | 87,309 | 37.2 | 16,269 | Yasuhide Nakayama | LDP | 30.3 | Ishin hold |
| Osaka 5th | Satoshi Umemura | Ishin | Satoshi Umemura | Ishin | 93,472 | 42.5 | 45,421 | Mio Sugita | LDP | 21.9 | Ishin hold |
| Osaka 6th | Kaoru Nishida | Ishin | Kaoru Nishida | Ishin | 87,431 | 42.6 | 44,812 | Masashi Nagai | LDP | 20.7 | Ishin hold |
| Osaka 7th | Takemitsu Okushita | Ishin | Takemitsu Okushita | Ishin | 88,242 | 39.1 | 9,660 | Naomi Tokashiki | LDP | 34.9 | Ishin hold |
| Osaka 8th | Joji Uruma | Ishin | Joji Uruma | Ishin | 93,189 | 38.6 | 15,501 | Keiichiro Korai | LDP | 32.2 | Ishin hold |
| Osaka 9th | Kei Hagiwara | Ishin | Kei Hagiwara | Ishin | 102,204 | 48.2 | 22,945 | Junpei Higashida | LDP | 37.4 | Ishin hold |
| Osaka 10th | Taku Ikeshita | Ishin | Taku Ikeshita | Ishin | 86,557 | 45.1 | 36,233 | Kanako Otsuji | CRA | 26.2 | Ishin hold |
| Osaka 11th | Hiroshi Nakatsuka | Ishin | Hiroshi Nakatsuka | Ishin | 113,436 | 49.4 | 71,627 | Matsumoto Naotaka | LDP | 18.2 | Ishin hold |
| Osaka 12th | Fumitake Fujita | Ishin | Fumitake Fujita | Ishin | 88,775 | 50.2 | 50,608 | Shinpei Kitagawa | LDP | 21.6 | Ishin hold |
| Osaka 13th | Ryohei Iwatani | Ishin | Ryohei Iwatani | Ishin | 77,433 | 37.9 | 12,240 | Koichi Munekiyo | LDP | 31.9 | Ishin hold |
| Osaka 14th | Hitoshi Aoyagi | Ishin | Hitoshi Aoyagi | Ishin | 121,049 | 57.8 | 62,476 | Motoyuki Odachi | LDP | 28.0 | Ishin hold |
| Osaka 15th | Yasuto Urano | Ishin | Yasuto Urano | Ishin | 92,248 | 47.9 | 18,870 | Tomoaki Shimada | LDP | 38.1 | Ishin hold |
| Osaka 16th | Masaki Kuroda | Ishin | Masaki Kuroda | Ishin | 73,063 | 41.2 | 25,219 | Hiroyuki Moriyama | CRA | 27.0 | Ishin hold |
| Osaka 17th | Nobuyuki Baba | Ishin | Nobuyuki Baba | Ishin | 78,362 | 49.0 | 35,647 | Asami Shigi | LDP | 26.7 | Ishin hold |
| Osaka 18th | Takashi Endo | Ishin | Takashi Endo | Ishin | 121,948 | 58.4 | 63,059 | Takatsugu Uchida | LDP | 28.2 | Ishin hold |
| Osaka 19th | Nobuhisa Ito | Ishin | Tomu Tanigawa | LDP | 58,410 | 36.9 | 713 | Nobuhisa Ito | Ishin | 36.5 | LDP gain from Ishin |
| Hyōgo 1st | Nobuhiko Isaka | CRA | Masahito Moriyama | LDP | 73,219 | 33.5 | 4,108 | Nobuhiko Isaka | CRA | 31.6 | LDP gain from CRA |
| Hyōgo 2nd | Kazuyoshi Akaba | CRA | Keishi Abe | Ishin | 82,982 | 45.0 | 36,674 | Jiro Funakawa | CRA | 25.1 | Ishin gain from CRA |
| Hyōgo 3rd | Yoshihiro Seki | LDP | Yoshihiro Seki | LDP | 74,806 | 46.9 | 40,534 | Yuichiro Wada | Ishin | 21.5 | LDP hold |
| Hyōgo 4th | Hisayuki Fujii | LDP | Hisayuki Fujii | LDP | 147,544 | 69.3 | 98,357 | Takashi Nakayama | CRA | 23.1 | LDP hold |
| Hyōgo 5th | Koichi Tani | LDP | Koichi Tani | LDP | 93,501 | 44.6 | 38,717 | Ryota Endo | Ishin | 26.1 | LDP hold |
| Hyōgo 6th | Shu Sakurai | CRA | Masaki Ogushi | LDP | 91,440 | 36.4 | 27,996 | Koichiro Ichimura | Ishin | 25.3 | LDP gain from CRA |
| Hyōgo 7th | Kenji Yamada | LDP | Kenji Yamada | LDP | 112,151 | 42.4 | 40,931 | Kei Miki | Ishin | 26.9 | LDP hold |
| Hyōgo 8th | Hiromasa Nakano | CRA | Shigeharu Aoyama | LDP | 85,970 | 43.3 | 37,876 | Junko Tokuyasu | Ishin | 24.2 | LDP gain from CRA |
| Hyōgo 9th | Yasutoshi Nishimura | LDP | Yasutoshi Nishimura | LDP | 116,526 | 58.3 | 61,919 | Keigo Hashimoto | CRA | 27.3 | LDP hold |
| Hyōgo 10th | Kisaburo Tokai | LDP | Kisaburo Tokai | LDP | 75,309 | 41.0 | 37,402 | Kenji Hori | Ishin | 20.7 | LDP hold |
| Hyōgo 11th | Takeaki Matsumoto | LDP | Takeaki Matsumoto | LDP | 86,090 | 43.5 | 30,333 | Hiroki Sumiyoshi | Ishin | 28.2 | LDP hold |
| Hyōgo 12th | Tsuyoshi Yamaguchi | LDP | Tsuyoshi Yamaguchi | LDP | 78,957 | 53.1 | 25,075 | Kotaro Ikehata | Ishin | 36.2 | LDP hold |
| Nara 1st | Sumio Mabuchi | CRA | Shigeki Kobayashi | LDP | 131,313 | 53.3 | 66,988 | Sumio Mabuchi | CRA | 26.1 | LDP gain from CRA |
| Nara 2nd | Sanae Takaichi | LDP | Sanae Takaichi | LDP | 193,708 | 87.0 | 164,787 | Eiko Ikeda | JCP | 13.0 | LDP hold |
| Nara 3rd | Taido Tanose | LDP | Taido Tanose | LDP | 120,018 | 62.8 | 82,951 | Daisuke Harayama | Ishin | 19.4 | LDP hold |
| Wakayama 1st | Daichi Yamamoto | LDP | Daichi Yamamoto | LDP | 95,836 | 46.2 | 64,484 | Yumi Hayashi | DPFP | 15.1 | LDP hold |
| Wakayama 2nd | Hiroshige Sekō | Ind. | Hiroshige Sekō | Ind. | 162,257 | 82.2 | 127,048 | Yoshihiro Hatano | JCP | 17.8 | Ind. hold |

Proportional representation results
| Party | Votes | Seats | Rank | Elected member | Constituency | Ratio |
|---|---|---|---|---|---|---|
| LDP | 2,842,876 (30.4%) | 10 | 1 | Hiroo Kotera | | |
| LDP | 2,842,876 (30.4%) | 10 | 2 | Masatoshi Ishida | | |
| LDP | 2,842,876 (30.4%) | 10 | 3 | Mamoru Shigemoto | Kyoto 3rd | 91.0% |
| LDP | 2,842,876 (30.4%) | 10 | 3 | Naomi Tokashiki | Osaka 7th | 89.0% |
| LDP | 2,842,876 (30.4%) | 10 | 3 | Koichi Munekiyo | Osaka 13th | 84.1% |
| LDP | 2,842,876 (30.4%) | 10 | 3 | Keiichiro Korai | Osaka 8th | 83.3% |
| LDP | 2,842,876 (30.4%) | 10 | 3 | Yasuhide Nakayama | Osaka 4th | 81.3% |
| LDP | 2,842,876 (30.4%) | 10 | 3 | Tomoaki Shimada | Osaka 15th | 79.5% |
| LDP | 2,842,876 (30.4%) | 10 | 3 | Junpei Higashida | Osaka 9th | 77.5% |
| LDP | 2,842,876 (30.4%) | 10 | 3 | Yoji Fujita | Kyoto 2nd | 74.6% |
| Ishin | 2,168,635 (23.2%) | 7 → 8 | 1 | Daisuke Harayama | Nara 3rd | 30.8% |
| Ishin | 2,168,635 (23.2%) | 7 → 8 | 2 | Nobuhisa Ito | Osaka 19th | 98.7% |
| Ishin | 2,168,635 (23.2%) | 7 → 8 | 2 | Koichiro Ichimura | Hyogo 6th | 69.3% |
| Ishin | 2,168,635 (23.2%) | 7 → 8 | 2 | Kotaro Ikehata | Hyogo 12th | 68.2% |
| Ishin | 2,168,635 (23.2%) | 7 → 8 | 2 | Hiroki Sumiyoshi | Hyogo 11th | 64.7% |
| Ishin | 2,168,635 (23.2%) | 7 → 8 | 2 | Kei Miki | Hyogo 7th | 63.5% |
| Ishin | 2,168,635 (23.2%) | 7 → 8 | 2 | Alex Saito | Shiga 1st | 61.8% |
| Ishin | 2,168,635 (23.2%) | 7 → 8 | 2 | Yuichiro Ichitani | Hyogo 1st | 60.5% |
| CRA | 1,332,752 (14.3%) | 4 → 5 | 1 | Kazuyoshi Akaba | | |
| CRA | 1,332,752 (14.3%) | 4 → 5 | 2 | Hiromasa Nakano | | |
| CRA | 1,332,752 (14.3%) | 4 → 5 | 3 | Kanae Yamamoto | | |
| CRA | 1,332,752 (14.3%) | 4 → 5 | 4 | Shinichi Isa | | |
| CRA | 1,332,752 (14.3%) | 4 → 5 | 5 | Tooru Kunishige | | |
| DPFP | 651,785 (7.0%) | 2 | 1 | Akinari Kawai | Shiga 1st | 50.9% |
| DPFP | 651,785 (7.0%) | 2 | 1 | Koichi Mukoyama | Hyogo 3rd | 45.6% |
| Sansei | 631,179 (6.8%) | 2 | 1 | Masaru Ishikawa | Osaka 7th | 34.4% |
| Sansei | 631,179 (6.8%) | 2 | 1 | Tani Koichiro | Hyogo 6th | 29.4% |
| Mirai | 553,496 (5.9%) | 2 → 0 (Note: Forfeited two seats due to lack of eligible candidates. Both candidates failed to surpass the required 10% of votes in their single-member constituency races.) | | | | |
| JCP | 480,188 (5.1%) | 1 | 1 | Kotaro Tatsumi | | |

== Chugoku block ==
2026 Japanese general election in Chugoku
- 8 February 2026

All 27 seats to the House of Representatives
| | Majority party | Minority party | Third party |
|---|---|---|---|
| Party | LDP | CRA | DPP |
| Last election | 17 seats | 8 seats | 1 seats |
| Constituency | 17 | 0 | 0 |
| PR seats | 5 | 2 | 1 |
| Total | 22 | 2 | 1 |
| Seat change | ▲5 | ▼6 | 0 |
| | Fourth party | Fifth party |
| Party | Sanseito | Ishin |
| Last election | 0 seats | 1 seat |
| Constituency | 0 | 0 |
| PR seats | 1 | 1 |
| Total | 1 | 1 |
| Seat change | ▲1 | 0 |

Single-member constituency results in Chugoku
| Constituency | Previous member | | Elected member | | Votes | % | Margin | Runner-up | | % | Status |
|---|---|---|---|---|---|---|---|---|---|---|---|
| Tottori 1st | Shigeru Ishiba | LDP | Shigeru Ishiba | LDP | 66,146 | 67.5 | 25,782 | Hiromi Yagawa | DPFP | 13.6 | LDP hold |
| Tottori 2nd | Ryosei Akazawa | LDP | Ryosei Akazawa | LDP | 67,736 | 62.3 | 31,604 | Shinji Yuhara | CRA | 33.2 | LDP hold |
| Shimane 1st | Akiko Kamei | CRA | Emiko Takagai | LDP | 67,438 | 51.0 | 17,571 | Akiko Kamei | CRA | 37.7 | LDP gain from CRA |
| Shimane 2nd | Yasuhiro Takami | LDP | Yasuhiro Takami | LDP | 98,015 | 61.5 | 62,953 | Sakoto Otsuka | CRA | 22.0 | LDP hold |
| Okayama 1st | Ichiro Aisawa | LDP | Ichiro Aisawa | LDP | 81,844 | 48.1 | 38,009 | Kensuke Harada | CRA | 25.8 | LDP hold |
| Okayama 2nd | Takashi Yamashita | LDP | Takashi Yamashita | LDP | 117,527 | 55.0 | 51,238 | Keisuke Tsumura | CRA | 31.0 | LDP hold |
| Okayama 3rd | Katsunobu Katō | LDP | Katsunobu Katō | LDP | 165,807 | 81.1 | 127,274 | Akiko Harada | JCP | 18.9 | LDP hold |
| Okayama 4th | Michiyoshi Yunoki | CRA | Gaku Hashimoto | LDP | 104,826 | 50.9 | 38,866 | Michiyoshi Yunoki | CRA | 32.0 | LDP gain from CRA |
| Hiroshima 1st | Fumio Kishida | LDP | Fumio Kishida | LDP | 102,700 | 53.3 | 67,558 | Kaiei Kawada | CRA | 18.2 | LDP hold |
| Hiroshima 2nd | Hiroshi Hiraguchi | LDP | Hiroshi Hiraguchi | LDP | 94,750 | 51.7 | 40,857 | Gen Fukuda | DPFP | 29.4 | LDP hold |
| Hiroshima 3rd | Tetsuo Saito | CRA | Rintaro Ishibashi | LDP | 100,352 | 51.4 | 42,377 | Katsuya Azuma | CRA | 29.7 | LDP gain from CRA |
| Hiroshima 4th | Seiki Soramoto | Ishin | Masayoshi Shintani | LDP | 89,563 | 47.0 | 28,228 | Seri Nabeshima | DPFP | 32.2 | LDP gain from Ishin |
| Hiroshima 5th | Koji Sato | CRA | Shin Yamamoto | LDP | 78,649 | 50.7 | 11,034 | Koji Sato | CRA | 43.7 | LDP gain from CRA |
| Hiroshima 6th | Fumiaki Kobayashi | LDP | Fumiaki Kobayashi | LDP | 119,827 | 67.0 | 70,358 | Tomoko Hata | CRA | 27.7 | LDP hold |
| Yamaguchi 1st | Masahiro Kōmura | LDP | Masahiro Kōmura | LDP | 124,364 | 63.5 | 85,256 | Kiyoshi Noda | DPFP | 20.0 | LDP hold |
| Yamaguchi 2nd | Nobuchiyo Kishi | LDP | Nobuchiyo Kishi | LDP | 132,409 | 62.1 | 51,668 | Hideo Hiraoka | CRA | 37.9 | LDP hold |
| Yamaguchi 3rd | Yoshimasa Hayashi | LDP | Yoshimasa Hayashi | LDP | 113,502 | 62.5 | 90,236 | Kaoru Shimamura | Sansei | 12.8 | LDP hold |

Proportional representation results
| Party | Votes | Seats | Rank | Elected member | Constituency | Ratio |
|---|---|---|---|---|---|---|
| LDP | 1,297,078 (43.2%) | 6 → 5 (Note: Forfeited one seat due to lack of candidates.) | 1 | Minoru Terada | | |
| LDP | 1,297,078 (43.2%) | 6 → 5 | 2 | Shojiro Hiranuma | | |
| LDP | 1,297,078 (43.2%) | 6 → 5 | 3 | Shinji Yoshida | | |
| LDP | 1,297,078 (43.2%) | 6 → 5 | 20 | Toshiko Abe | | |
| LDP | 1,297,078 (43.2%) | 6 → 5 | 21 | Yuji Tawarada | | |
| CRA | 620,211 (20.6%) | 2 | 1 | Tetsuo Saito | | |
| CRA | 620,211 (20.6%) | 2 | 2 | Akira Hirabayashi | | |
| DPFP | 273,263 (9.1%) | 1 | 1 | Seri Nabeshima | Hiroshima 4th | 68.4% |
| Sansei | 252,036 (8.4%) | 1 | 1 | Kaoru Shimamura | Yamaguchi 3rd | 20.4% |
| Ishin | 213,428 (7.1%) | 0 → 1 | 2 | Yoshinori Kita | | |

== Shikoku block ==
2026 Japanese general election in Shikoku
- 8 February 2026

All 16 seats to the House of Representatives
| | Majority party | Minority party | Third party |
|---|---|---|---|
| Party | LDP | CRA | DPP |
| Last election | 10 seats | 4 seats | 2 seats |
| Constituency | 8 | 1 | 1 |
| PR seats | 4 | 1 | 1 |
| Total | 12 | 2 | 2 |
| Seat change | ▲2 | ▼2 | 0 |

Single-member constituency results in Shikoku
| Constituency | Previous member | | Elected member | | Votes | % | Margin | Runner-up | | % | Status |
|---|---|---|---|---|---|---|---|---|---|---|---|
| Tokushima 1st | Hirobumi Niki | LDP | Hirobumi Niki | LDP | 107,440 | 58.2 | 60,480 | Ei Takahashi | CRA | 25.4 | LDP hold |
| Tokushima 2nd | Shunichi Yamaguchi | LDP | Shunichi Yamaguchi | LDP | 64,980 | 48.6 | 28,351 | Kamon Iizumi | DPFP | 27.4 | LDP hold |
| Kagawa 1st | Junya Ogawa | CRA | Junya Ogawa | CRA | 73,237 | 43.0 | 829 | Takuya Hirai | LDP | 42.6 | CRA hold |
| Kagawa 2nd | Yuichiro Tamaki | DPFP | Yuichiro Tamaki | DPFP | 82,752 | 59.9 | 36,005 | Takakazu Seto | LDP | 33.8 | DPFP hold |
| Kagawa 3rd | Keitaro Ohno | LDP | Keitaro Ohno | LDP | 71,529 | 59.1 | 35,486 | Tomomitsu Kawasaki | DPFP | 29.8 | LDP hold |
| Ehime 1st | Akihisa Shiozaki | LDP | Akihisa Shiozaki | LDP | 127,770 | 60.4 | 81,525 | Tomoe Ishii | DPFP | 21.9 | LDP hold |
| Ehime 2nd | Yoichi Shiraishi | CRA | Takumi Ihara | LDP | 100,438 | 47.6 | 15,585 | Yoichi Shiraishi | CRA | 40.2 | LDP gain from CRA |
| Ehime 3rd | Junji Hasegawa | LDP | Junji Hasegawa | LDP | 119,930 | 71.2 | 80,836 | Akihito Hagiwara | CRA | 23.2 | LDP hold |
| Kōchi 1st | Gen Nakatani | LDP | Gen Nakatani | LDP | 92,043 | 59.8 | 53,183 | Yusuke Tadokoro | CRA | 25.2 | LDP hold |
| Kōchi 2nd | Masanao Ozaki | LDP | Masanao Ozaki | LDP | 102,523 | 69.5 | 78,408 | Yuriko Hamakawa | JCP | 16.3 | LDP hold |

Proportional representation results
| Party | Votes | Seats | Rank | Elected member | Constituency | Ratio |
|---|---|---|---|---|---|---|
| LDP | 691,402 (42.0%) | 4 | 1 | Takuya Hirai | Kagawa 1st | 98.8% |
| LDP | 691,402 (42.0%) | 4 | 1 | Takakazu Seto | Kagawa 2nd | 56.4% |
| LDP | 691,402 (42.0%) | 4 | 10 | Seiichiro Murakami | | |
| LDP | 691,402 (42.0%) | 4 | 11 | Norihiro Nakayama | | |
| CRA | 299,777 (18.2%) | 1 | 1 | Masayasu Yamasaki | | |
| DPFP | 213,661 (13.0%) | 1 | 1 | Kamon Iizumi | Tokushima 2nd | 56.3% |

== Kyushu block ==
2026 Japanese general election in Kyushu
- 8 February 2026

All 54 seats to the House of Representatives
| | Majority party | Minority party | Third party |
|---|---|---|---|
| Party | LDP | CRA | DPP |
| Last election | 26 seats | 14 seats | 3 seats |
| Constituency | 29 | 2 | 2 |
| PR seats | 10 | 4 | 2 |
| Total | 39 | 6 | 4 |
| Seat change | ▲13 | ▼8 | ▲1 |
| | Fourth party | Fifth party | Sixth party |
| Party | Sanseito | Mirai | Ishin |
| Last election | 1 seat | New | 2 seats |
| Constituency | 0 | 0 | 0 |
| PR seats | 2 | 1 | 1 |
| Total | 2 | 1 | 1 |
| Seat change | ▲1 | ▲1 | ▼1 |

Single-member constituency results in Kyushu
| Constituency | Previous member | | Elected member | | Votes | % | Margin | Runner-up | | % | Status |
|---|---|---|---|---|---|---|---|---|---|---|---|
| Fukuoka 1st | Takahiro Inoue | LDP | Takahiro Inoue | LDP | 106,865 | 48.3 | 60,629 | Keisuke Maruo | CRA | 20.9 | LDP hold |
| Fukuoka 2nd | Shuji Inatomi | CRA | Makoto Oniki | LDP | 136,442 | 53.6 | 60,157 | Shuji Inatomi | CRA | 30.0 | LDP gain from CRA |
| Fukuoka 3rd | Atsushi Koga | LDP | Atsushi Koga | LDP | 132,247 | 53.9 | 72,472 | Genki Nieda | CRA | 24.4 | LDP hold |
| Fukuoka 4th | Hideki Miyauchi | LDP | Hideki Miyauchi | LDP | 110,544 | 53.6 | 47,025 | Ryotaro Konomi | DPFP | 30.9 | LDP hold |
| Fukuoka 5th | Wataru Kurihara | LDP | Wataru Kurihara | LDP | 144,014 | 57.5 | 91,459 | Kenichi Kawamoto | DPFP | 21.0 | LDP hold |
| Fukuoka 6th | Jiro Hatoyama | LDP | Jiro Hatoyama | LDP | 111,832 | 61.8 | 56,294 | Masahiko Kondo | DPFP | 30.7 | LDP hold |
| Fukuoka 7th | Satoshi Fujimaru | LDP | Satoshi Fujimaru | LDP | 95,132 | 67.1 | 48,540 | Akihisa Kameda | CRA | 32.9 | LDP hold |
| Fukuoka 8th | Tarō Asō | LDP | Tarō Asō | LDP | 111,727 | 67.5 | 83,762 | Rie Okizono | Reiwa | 16.9 | LDP hold |
| Fukuoka 9th | Rintaro Ogata | Ind. | Rintaro Ogata | Ind. | 100,800 | 51.9 | 33,727 | Asato Mihara | LDP | 34.6 | Ind. hold |
| Fukuoka 10th | Takashi Kii | CRA | Haruka Yoshimura | LDP | 86,338 | 42.5 | 20,880 | Takashi Kii | CRA | 32.2 | LDP gain from CRA |
| Fukuoka 11th | Yomonobu Murakami | Ishin | Ryota Takeda | LDP | 62,419 | 44.7 | 19,417 | Yomonobu Murakami | Ishin | 30.8 | LDP gain from Ishin |
| Saga 1st | Kazuhiro Haraguchi | Genyu | Kazuchika Iwata | LDP | 84,220 | 45.7 | 1,192 | Kazuhiro Haraguchi | Genyu | 45.0 | LDP gain from Genyu |
| Saga 2nd | Hiroshi Ogushi | CRA | Yasushi Furukawa | LDP | 106,320 | 55.5 | 21,135 | Hiroshi Ogushi | CRA | 44.5 | LDP gain from CRA |
| Nagasaki 1st | Hideko Nishioka | DPFP | Hideko Nishioka | DPFP | 93,931 | 52.5 | 41,137 | Masumi Asada | LDP | 29.5 | DPFP hold |
| Nagasaki 2nd | Ryusho Kato | LDP | Ryusho Kato | LDP | 126,751 | 56.3 | 53,800 | Katsuhiko Yamada | CRA | 32.4 | LDP hold |
| Nagasaki 3rd | Yozo Kaneko | LDP | Yozo Kaneko | LDP | 133,418 | 72.1 | 81,893 | Kouta Tasaki | CRA | 27.9 | LDP hold |
| Kumamoto 1st | Minoru Kihara | LDP | Minoru Kihara | LDP | 144,036 | 63.2 | 88,234 | Satoru Kamata | CRA | 24.5 | LDP hold |
| Kumamoto 2nd | Daisuke Nishino | LDP | Daisuke Nishino | LDP | 115,583 | 71.5 | 84,564 | Tomonori Maeda | Sansei | 19.2 | LDP hold |
| Kumamoto 3rd | Tetsushi Sakamoto | LDP | Tetsushi Sakamoto | LDP | 116,925 | 66.6 | 84,075 | Kazuyoshi Tsuruta | Sansei | 18.7 | LDP hold |
| Kumamoto 4th | Yasushi Kaneko | LDP | Yasushi Kaneko | LDP | 141,699 | 66.2 | 118,957 | Masayoshi Yagami | Ishin | 10.6 | LDP hold |
| Ōita 1st | Shuji Kira | Ind. | Hiroaki Eto | LDP | 95,484 | 45.1 | 24,333 | Shuji Kira | Ind. | 33.6 | LDP gain from Ind. |
| Ōita 2nd | Ken Hirose | LDP | Ken Hirose | LDP | 89,082 | 61.5 | 33,265 | Hajime Yoshikawa | CRA | 38.5 | LDP hold |
| Ōita 3rd | Takeshi Iwaya | LDP | Takeshi Iwaya | LDP | 57,996 | 34.6 | 7,315 | Kayako Kobayashi | CRA | 30.2 | LDP hold |
| Miyazaki 1st | Sō Watanabe | CRA | Sō Watanabe | CRA | 72,280 | 40.3 | 14,113 | Shunsuke Takei | LDP | 32.4 | CRA hold |
| Miyazaki 2nd | Taku Etō | LDP | Shinji Nagatomo | DPFP | 73,994 | 50.7 | 8,364 | Taku Etō | LDP | 45.0 | DPFP gain from LDP |
| Miyazaki 3rd | Yoshihisa Furukawa | LDP | Yoshihisa Furukawa | LDP | 94,868 | 77.1 | 66,720 | Daisuke Takase | Sansei | 22.9 | LDP hold |
| Kagoshima 1st | Hiroshi Kawauchi | CRA | Takuma Miyaji | LDP | 92,321 | 51.0 | 35,059 | Hiroshi Kawauchi | CRA | 31.7 | LDP gain from CRA |
| Kagoshima 2nd | Satoshi Mitazono | LDP | Satoshi Mitazono | LDP | 115,396 | 68.5 | 79,826 | Norimi Takahashi | Sansei | 21.1 | LDP hold |
| Kagoshima 3rd | Takeshi Noma | CRA | Takeshi Noma | CRA | 88,518 | 50.8 | 2,736 | Yasuhiro Ozato | LDP | 49.2 | CRA hold |
| Kagoshima 4th | Hiroshi Moriyama | LDP | Hiroshi Moriyama | LDP | 102,727 | 62.5 | 78,651 | Hisashi Nakamura | DPFP | 14.6 | LDP hold |
| Okinawa 1st | Seiken Akamine | JCP | Konosuke Kokuba | LDP | 58,808 | 42.3 | 5,577 | Seiken Akamine | JCP | 38.3 | LDP gain from JCP |
| Okinawa 2nd | Kunio Arakaki | CRA | Masahisa Miyazaki | LDP | 71,071 | 43.2 | 13,571 | Kunio Arakaki | CRA | 35.0 | LDP gain from CRA |
| Okinawa 3rd | Aiko Shimajiri | LDP | Aiko Shimajiri | LDP | 87,075 | 51.8 | 25,361 | Tomohiro Yara | CRA | 36.7 | LDP hold |
| Okinawa 4th | Kosaburo Nishime | LDP | Kosaburo Nishime | LDP | 76,580 | 49.8 | 38,846 | Yoshiyuki Toita | CRA | 24.6 | LDP hold |

Proportional representation results
| Party | Votes | Seats | Rank | Elected member | Constituency | Ratio |
|---|---|---|---|---|---|---|
| LDP | 2,516,334 (39.9%) | 10 | 1 | Yasuhiro Ozato | Kagoshima 3rd | 96.9% |
| LDP | 2,516,334 (39.9%) | 10 | 1 | Taku Etō | Miyazaki 2nd | 88.6% |
| LDP | 2,516,334 (39.9%) | 10 | 1 | Shunsuke Takei | Miyazaki 1st | 80.4% |
| LDP | 2,516,334 (39.9%) | 10 | 1 | Asato Mihara | Fukuoka 9th | 66.5% |
| LDP | 2,516,334 (39.9%) | 10 | 1 | Masumi Asada | Nagasaki 1st | 56.2% |
| LDP | 2,516,334 (39.9%) | 10 | 32 | Hiroshi Ueno | | |
| LDP | 2,516,334 (39.9%) | 10 | 33 | Hirotake Yasuoka | | |
| LDP | 2,516,334 (39.9%) | 10 | 34 | Hiroki Abe | | |
| LDP | 2,516,334 (39.9%) | 10 | 35 | Aki Shirasaka | | |
| LDP | 2,516,334 (39.9%) | 10 | 36 | Masami Kawano | | |
| CRA | 1,181,744 (18.7%) | 4 | 1 | Masakazu Hamachi | | |
| CRA | 1,181,744 (18.7%) | 4 | 2 | Nobuhiro Yoshida | | |
| CRA | 1,181,744 (18.7%) | 4 | 3 | Yasukuni Kinjo | | |
| CRA | 1,181,744 (18.7%) | 4 | 4 | Yoshihiro Kawano | | |
| Sansei | 519,904 (8.2%) | 2 | 1 | Toshiyuki Kinoshita | Fukuoka 2nd | 24.2% |
| Sansei | 519,904 (8.2%) | 2 | 4 | Shunichi Makino | Kagoshima 1st | 29.3% |
| DPFP | 505,129 (8.0%) | 2 | 1 | Konomi Ryotaro | Fukuoka 4th | 57.4% |
| DPFP | 505,129 (8.0%) | 2 | 1 | Masahiko Kondo | Fukuoka 6th | 49.6% |
| Mirai | 375,396 (5.9%) | 1 | 1 | Aoi Furukawa | | |
| Ishin | 374,428 (5.9%) | 1 | 1 | Tomonobu Murakami | Fukuoka 11th | 68.8% |

== Leaders' races ==
Results for party leaders
| Party | Member | Constituency | Votes | % | Position | Status |
|---|---|---|---|---|---|---|
| LDP | Sanae Takaichi | Nara 2nd | 193,708 | 87.0 | 1st | Re-elected |
| CRA | Yoshihiko Noda | Chiba 14th | 99,324 | 45.0 | 1st | Re-elected |
| CRA | Tetsuo Saito | Chugoku PR | 620,211 | 20.6 | 1st | Re-elected |
| Ishin | Hirofumi Yoshimura | Governor of Osaka | | | | |
| Ishin | Fumitake Fujita | Osaka 12th | 88,775 | 50.2 | 1st | Re-elected |
| DPFP | Yuichiro Tamaki | Kagawa 2nd | 82,752 | 59.9 | 1st | Re-elected |
| Sansei | Sohei Kamiya | House of Councillors | | | | |
| Mirai | Takahiro Anno | House of Councillors | | | | |
| JCP | Tomoko Tamura | Tokyo PR | 407,146 | 6.0 | 1st | Re-elected |
| Reiwa | Taro Yamamoto | Did not run | | | | |
| Genyu | Takashi Kawamura | Aichi 1st | 94,339 | 42.5 | 1st | Re-elected |
| Genyu | Kazuhiro Haraguchi | Saga 1st | 83,028 | 45.0 | 2nd | Defeated |

== Closest races ==
Candidates with a narrow loss ratio of over 90%
| Constituency | Candidate | | Votes | % | Ratio |
|---|---|---|---|---|---|
| Hokkaido 10th | Koichi Watanabe | LDP | 74,887 | 50.0 | 99.97 |
| Kagawa 1st | Takuya Hirai | LDP | 72,408 | 42.6 | 98.9 |
| Osaka 19th | Nobuhisa Ito | Ishin | 57,697 | 36.5 | 98.8 |
| Saga 1st | Kazuhiro Haraguchi | Genyu | 83,028 | 45.0 | 98.6 |
| Ibaraki 6th | Yamato Aoyama | Ind. | 104,844 | 42.2 | 97.6 |
| Akita 3rd | Nobuhide Minorikawa | LDP | 85,063 | 49.3 | 97.1 |
| Kagoshima 3rd | Yasuhiro Ozato | LDP | 85,782 | 49.2 | 96.9 |
| Ibaraki 1st | Nobuyuki Fukushima | Ind. | 84,703 | 40.3 | 96.7 |
| Kanagawa 9th | Hirofumi Ryu | CRA | 84,024 | 44.8 | 96.0 |
| Tokyo 27th | Akira Nagatsuma | CRA | 80,997 | 36.2 | 95.0 |
| Hyōgo 1st | Nobuhiko Isaka | CRA | 69,111 | 31.6 | 94.4 |
| Fukushima 1st | Emi Kaneko | CRA | 94,371 | 42.5 | 93.9 |
| Kanagawa 19th | Jesús Fukasaku | DPFP | 77,371 | 37.7 | 92.7 |
| Iwate 1st | Hiromasa Yonai | LDP | 67,811 | 40.9 | 92.6 |
| Tochigi 3rd | Kazuo Yana | LDP | 53,975 | 40.6 | 92.3 |
| Hokkaido 9th | Tatsumaru Yamaoka | CRA | 81,063 | 39.7 | 92.1 |
| Saitama 13th | Mikihiko Hashimoto | DPFP | 69,464 | 36.0 | 91.4 |
| Mie 3rd | Katsuya Okada | CRA | 90,701 | 38.4 | 91.3 |
| Kyoto 3rd | Mamoru Shigemoto | LDP | 62,406 | 33.4 | 91.1 |
| Saitama 14th | Yoshihiro Suzuki | DPFP | 70,386 | 37.0 | 90.8 |
| Okinawa 1st | Seiken Akamine | JCP | 53,231 | 38.3 | 90.5 |
| Ibaraki 7th | Keiko Nagaoka | LDP | 76,700 | 47.5 | 90.3 |
