= Aoi Furukawa =

Japanese politician (born 1991)

- 古川 あおい

Member of the House of Representatives
- Incumbent
- Assumed office 8 February 2026
- Constituency: Kyushu PR

Secretary-General of Team Mirai
- Incumbent
- Assumed office 16 September 2026
- Leader: Takahiro Anno
- Preceded by: Satoshi Takayama

Personal details
- Born: 27 June 1991 (age 35) Saga City, Saga, Japan
- Party: Team Mirai
- Parent: Yasushi Furukawa (father)
- Education: University of Tokyo

Aoi Furukawa (古川あおい, Furukawa Aoi; born 27 June 1991) is a Japanese politician serving as a member of the House of Representatives since 2026. He is the son of Yasushi Furukawa. On 16 September 2026 he was appointed the Secretary-General of Team Mirai.
