= Satoshi Takayama (politician, born 1986) =

Japanese politician (born 1986)

- 高山 聡史
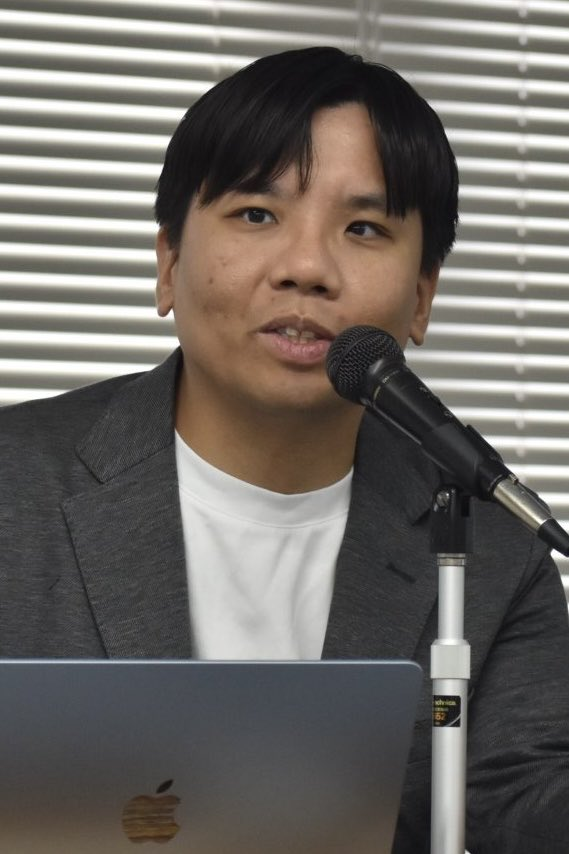
- Takayama in 2025

Member of the House of Representatives
- Incumbent
- Assumed office 9 February 2026
- Constituency: Tokyo PR

Secretary-General of Team Mirai
- In office 8 May 2025 – 16 September 2026
- Leader: Takahiro Anno
- Preceded by: Position established
- Succeeded by: Aoi Furukawa

Personal details
- Born: 21 September 1986 (age 40) Kyoto, Japan
- Party: Team Mirai
- Education: Keio University
- Occupation: Consultant

Satoshi Takayama (Japanese: 高山 聡史, Hepburn: Takayama Satoshi; born 21 September 1986) is a Japanese politician who is a member of the House of Representatives since 2026 for Tokyo proportional representation block. A founding member of Team Mirai, Takayama served as the party's Secretary-General between 2025 and 2026.

== Early life ==
Born in Kyoto, Takayama attended Nada High School before going on to Keio University, where he earned both his undergraduate and graduate degrees in economics. After graduating, he worked as a consultant at Boston Consulting Group before working in business development at several Artificial intelligence (AI) startups.

== Political career ==
In May 2025, Takayama became a founding member of Team Mirai, becoming its Secretary-General. In the 2025 House of Councillors election, he ran as part of Mirai's national proportional representation block list. Although he did not win, party leader Takahiro Anno secured a seat, giving the party its first seat in the National Diet.

In the 2026 general election, Takayama ran in Mirai's Tokyo proportional representation block. Mirai went on to win 4 seats in Tokyo PR, with Takayama being one of them, and was elected as a result, becoming a member of the House of Representatives.

In September 2026, he was replaced as secretary-general by Aoi Furukawa.
