= Shiori Yamao =

Japanese politician

- 山尾 志桜里
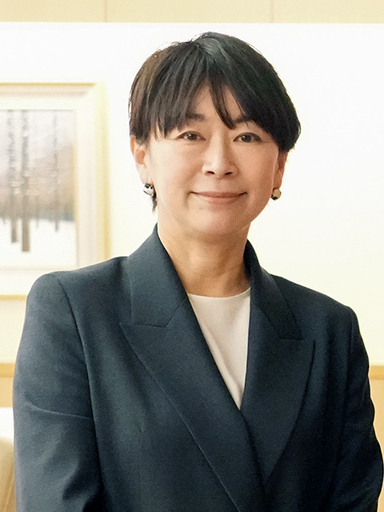
- Yamao in 2025

Member of the House of Representatives
- In office 14 December 2014 – 14 October 2021
- Preceded by: Junji Suzuki
- Succeeded by: Junji Suzuki
- Constituency: Aichi 7th
- In office 30 August 2009 – 16 November 2012
- Preceded by: Junji Suzuki
- Succeeded by: Junji Suzuki
- Constituency: Aichi 7th

Personal details
- Born: 24 July 1974 (age 52) Sendai, Miyagi, Japan
- Party: DPP (since 2020)
- Other political affiliations: DPJ (2009–2016); DP (2016–2017); Independent (2017; 2020); CDP (2017–2020)
- Education: University of Tokyo
- Website: www.yamaoshiori.jp

Shiori Yamao (山尾 志桜里, Yamao Shiori; née Kanno) is a former member of the Japanese House of Representatives for the Aichi 7th district. Yamao was a member of the Constitutional Democratic Party of Japan from 2017 to 2020. She was the policy chief of the Democratic Party and a former liberal member of the Democratic Party of Japan. She has been elected to the Japanese House of Representatives thrice. She rose to prominence by criticizing Prime Minister Shinzo Abe for not handling the issue of nursery school waiting lists.

Inter-Parliamentary Alliance on China Japanese secletary-general.

== Political career ==
=== Allegations of affair and resignation ===
Following allegations of an extramarital affair with Rintaro Kuramochi published in Shukan Bunshun, Yamao resigned from the Democratic Party. She denied having the affair and maintained that the allegations were false. Her resignation was viewed as an attempt to control damage within the Democratic Party, which was struggling with fledgling support at that time.

The allegations did not dent her popularity back in her home district. Although she had to run as an independent, she was able to hold her district in the election on 22 October 2017 by a narrow margin of 834 votes. Her advocacy and her status as a prominent Diet rival to Prime Minister Abe were touted as the main reasons of her high support in the district, particularly among swing voters. Her tough stance against Abe made her a constant target of right-wing campaigners. After her win, a rumor of voting fraud in the district was spread and the local election office was bombarded with calls and emails claiming that she was illegitimately elected.

=== Post 2017 election ===
Yamao applied to join the new progressive Constitutional Democratic Party after the 2017 election. The CDP did not grant her party membership straight away but allowed her to sit as independent member in the CDP caucus in the House of Representatives. Her entry application was approved on 26 December 2017. She filed a notice of withdrawal on 18 March 2020 and was accepted on 24 March 2020.

== Involvement in the special mission of the Kishida Cabinet ==
After the assassination of Shinzo Abe on 8 July 2022, the longstanding ties between the ruling Liberal Democratic Party with the Unification Church (UC) gained huge coverage by the Japanese media and plunged the Kishida Cabinet's approval. The UC was known for their predatory fundraising, known locally as spiritual sales, which was specifically targeting Japanese people. After Prime Minister Fumio Kishida reshuffled his second cabinet, Minister of Digital Affairs Taro Kono, who was also given the special mission of consumer affairs and food safety, established the "Spiritual Sales Review Committee" to obtain suggestions from experts of cult-related frauds. Shiori Kanno was one of the eight members initially elected into the committee.

== Political positions ==
Yamao is known to be opposed to the Trans-Pacific Partnership, arguing that the agreement does not protect Japan's national interests.

In a joint letter initiated by Norbert Röttgen and Anthony Gonzalez ahead of the 47th G7 summit in 2021, Yamao joined some 70 legislators from Europe and the US in calling upon their leaders to take a tough stance on China and to "avoid becoming dependent" on the country for technology including artificial intelligence and 5G.

Yamao insists on “Constitutionalistic Revision (立憲的改憲),” aiming for constitutional revision from a “liberal” perspective. She was one of the members of the Commission on the Constitution (House of Representatives) who represents the DPFP as of February 2021. She opposed constitutional revision by the Abe administration. Regarding Article 9, she proposes to change the text to limit the sphere of the Self Defense Forces' activity only to individual self-defense purposes, denying its collective self-defense right.
