= Kanagawa 19th district =

Electoral district in Tokyo, Japan

Kanagawa 19th District
- 神奈川県第19区
- Parliamentary constituency for the Japanese House of Representatives
- Parliamentary constituencies in Kanagawa Prefecture

- Detailed map of parliamentary constituencies in Yokohama city
- Prefecture: Kanagawa
- Proportional Block: Southern Kanto
- Electorate: 368,329 (as of September 2022)

Current constituency
- Created: 2022
- Seats: One
- Party: LDP
- Representatives: Kusama Tsuyoshi
- Created from: Parts of: Kanagawa 7th; Kanagwa 8th; Kanagawa 9th; Kanagawa 18th

Kanagawa 19th District (神奈川県第19区, Kanagawa-ken dai-junana-ku) is an electoral district of the Japanese House of Representatives. The district was created as part of the 2022 reapportionments that added two districts to Kanagawa Prefecture. Kusama Tsuyoshi, former member of the Yokohama City Council, became the first representative as a result of the 2024 general election.

== Area ==
- Tsuzuki Ward of Yokohama
- Miyamae Ward of Kawasaki

Previously, most of Tsuzuki had been a part of the 7th district and most of Miyamae had been a part of the 18th district.

== Elected representatives ==
Representative	Party	Years served	Notes
Kusama Tsuyoshi	LDP	2024 –	

== Election results ==
2026
Party	Candidate	Votes	%	±%
LDP	Kusama Tsuyoshi	83,450	40.7	▲9.4
DPP	Jesús Fukasaku (won seat in Southern Kantō PR block)	77,371	37.7	▲13.1
Ishin	Masaru Soeda	26,090	12.7	▲0.2
Sanseitō	Kazuma Muroi	18,304	8.9	
Registered electors		369,523		
Turnout			58.68	▲1.63
LDP hold				

2024
Party	Candidate	Votes	%	±%
LDP	Kusama Tsuyoshi	64,315	31.3	
CDP	Takashi Satō	50,857	24.8	
DPP	Jesús Fukasaku (won seat in Southern Kantō PR block)	50,578	24.6	
Ishin	Masaru Soeda	25,630	12.5	
JCP	Katsuhiro Yokozeki	9,008	4.4	
Independent	Sayuri Kiyoshi	4,859	2.4	
Registered electors		368,832		
Turnout			57.05	
