= Aichi 7th district =

Legislative district of Japan

Aichi 7th District
- Parliamentary constituency for the Japanese House of Representatives
- Numbered map of Aichi Prefecture single-member districts
- Prefecture: Aichi
- Proportional District: Tōkai
- Electorate: 448,591 (2016)

Current constituency
- Created: 1994
- Seats: One
- Party: DPP
- Representative: Saria Hino
- Created from: Aichi's 2nd "medium-sized" district
- Municipalities: Cities of Ōbu, Owariasahi, Toyoake, Nisshin, Nagakute, Aichi District.

Aichi 7th district (愛知県[第]7区, Aichi-ken-[dai-]nanaku) is a single-member constituency of the House of Representatives, the lower house of the national Diet of Japan. It covers the commuter and industrial towns northeast of Nagoya. The district consists of the cities of Ōbu, Owariasahi, Toyoake, Nisshin, Nagakute and Aichi District. As of 2016, 448,591 eligible voters were registered in the district.

== Background ==
The commuter and industrial towns surrounding Nagoya have long been regarded as a bastion for anti-LDP forces and this district is no exception. The 7th district and its predecessors have continuously elected non-LDP members to the Diet. After the introduction of parallel voting and single-member districts in 1996, the district has only elected one LDP member, Junji Suzuki, who was elected in the LDP landslides of 2005, 2012, and 2021.

== List of representatives ==
Representative	Party	Dates	Notes
Takashi Aoyama	NFP	1996 – 2000	
Kenji Kobayashi	DPJ	2000 – 2005	Also lost in the PR block
Junji Suzuki	LDP	2005 – 2009	Also lost in the PR block
Shiori Yamao	DPJ	2009 – 2012	Also lost in the PR block
Junji Suzuki	LDP	2012 – 2014	Won in the PR block
Shiori Yamao	DPJ	2014 – 2016	
Shiori Yamao	DP	2016 – 2017	
Shiori Yamao	Ind	2017	
Shiori Yamao	CDP	2017 – 2021	
Junji Suzuki	LDP	2021 – 2024	
Saria Hino	DPP	2024 –	

== Election results ==
2026
Party	Candidate	Votes	%	±%
DPP	Saria Hino (incumbent)	108,322	49.8	▼6.1
LDP	Junji Suzuki (elected in Tōkai PR block)	94,973	43.6	▲7.9
JCP	Kōichi Suzuki	14,373	6.6	▼1.8
Registered electors		353,882		
Turnout			63.57	▲5.42
DPP hold				

2024
Party	Candidate	Votes	%	±%
DPP	Saria Hino	111,406	55.88	New
LDP (endorsed by Komeito)	Junji Suzuki (incumbent)	71,176	35.70	▼19.00
Communist	Kōichi Suzuki	16,780	8.42	▼3.28
Majority		40,230	20.18	▼0.92
Registered electors		353,528		
Turnout		199,362	58.15	▼1.39
DPP gain from LDP				

2021
Party	Candidate	Votes	%	±%
LDP	Junji Suzuki	144,725	54.7	▲4.9
CDP	Kazuyoshi Morimoto	88,914	33.6	
JCP	Hatsumi Suyama	30,956	11.7	
Turnout			59.54	▼0.01
LDP gain from Independent				

2017
Party	Candidate	Votes	%	±%
Independent	Shiori Yamao	128,163	50.16	▲4.56
LDP	Junji Suzuki (elected by PR, endorsed by Kōmeitō)	127,329	49.84	▲5.42
Majority		834	0.32	
Turnout			59.55	▲1.80
Independent hold		Swing	▼0.43	

2014
Party	Candidate	Votes	%	±%
Democratic	Shiori Yamao	113,474	46.60	▲10.74
LDP	Junji Suzuki (elected by PR, endorsed by Kōmeitō)	108,151	44.42	▲1.58
JCP	Osamu Gōukon	21,872	8.98	▲2.87
Majority		4,677	2.18	
Turnout			57.75	▼4.56
Democratic gain from LDP		Swing	▲4.58	

2012
Party	Candidate	Votes	%	±%
LDP	Junji Suzuki (endorsed by Kōmeitō)	110,390	42.84	▲6.32
Democratic	Shiori Yamao (endorsed by PNP)	92,398	35.86	▼25.26
Tomorrow	Hiromi Masaki (endorsed by NPD)	39,141	15.19	N/A
JCP	Osamu Gōukon	15,732	6.11	▲3.75
Majority		17,992	6.98	
Turnout			62.31	▼10.38
LDP gain from Democratic		Swing	▲15.79	

2009
Party	Candidate	Votes	%	±%
Democratic	Shiori Yamao	182,028	61.12	▲19.63
LDP	Junji Suzuki	108,783	36.52	▼13.48
JCP	Kumiko Nagata	7,032	2.36	▼6.15
Majority		73,245	24.60	
Turnout			72.69	
Democratic gain from LDP		Swing	▲16.56	

2005
Party	Candidate	Votes	%	±%
LDP	Junji Suzuki	134,535	50.00	
Democratic	Kenji Kobayashi	111,654	41.49	
JCP	Takumi Sakabayashi	22,902	8.51	

2003
Party	Candidate	Votes	%	±%
Democratic	Kenji Kobayashi	102,710	44.1	
LDP	Takashi Aoyama (elected by PR)	93,882	40.3	
Social Democratic	Reiko Ōshima	20,172	8.7	
JCP	Takumi Sakabayashi	16,255	7.0	

2000
Party	Candidate	Votes	%	±%
Democratic	Kenji Kobayashi	86,651	38.5	
LDP	Junji Suzuki	83,601	37.2	
Social Democratic	Reiko Ōshima (elected by PR)	28,125	12.5	
JCP	Takumi Sakabayashi	23,095	10.3	
Liberal League	Isamu Harada	1,841	0.8	
Independent	Akihiro Ozaki	1,621	0.7	

1996
Party	Candidate	Votes	%	±%
New Frontier	Takashi Aoyama	91,439	47.5	
LDP	Taichi Niwa	49,727	25.9	
Democratic	Keiko Itō	24,620	12.8	
JCP	Hidetoshi Harada	23,009	12.0	
Liberal League	Tsuneo Ichikawa	2,045	2.0	
People's	Yōko Ōshima	1,080	0.6	
Culture Forum	Hiromichi Ebata	442	0.2	
