= Team Mirai =

Political party in Japan

Team Mirai チームみらい
- Leader: Takahiro Anno
- Secretary-General: Aoi Furukawa
- Founder: Takahiro Anno
- Founded: 8 May 2025
- Headquarters: SNUG MINAMI-AZABU 303, 2-8-21 Minami-Azabu, Minato, Tokyo
- Membership (February 2026): 2,600
- Ideology: E-democracy; Plurality; Technocracy; Social liberalism; Third Way
- Political position: Centre
- Slogan: 未来は明るいと信じられる国へ; Mirai wa akarui to shinjirareru kuni e ('Toward a country where we can believe the future is bright')
- Senators: 1 / 248
- Representatives: 11 / 465
- Prefectural assembly members: 0 / 2,675
- City and town assembly members: 0 / 30,490

Website
- team-mir.ai
- Politics of Japan; Political parties; Elections; A: The party is commonly described as centrist party because of its supporters, but its members avoid taking a specific stance. They take centre-right stances on some fiscal and security policies, while they also take centre-left stances on social policies.

Team Mirai (Japanese: チームみらい, Hepburn: Chīmu Mirai; lit. 'Team Future') is a political party in Japan founded by AI engineer Takahiro Anno. The party supports E-democracy and has been described as technocratic. The party was established on 8 May 2025, evolving from "Team Anno," which supported his candidacy in the 2024 Tokyo gubernatorial election. The party advocates for "Digital Democracy" and aims to implement technology to ensure "no one is left behind."

In the 2025 Japanese House of Councillors election, the party won its first seat in the Diet. In the subsequent 2026 Japanese general election, it made significant gains, securing 11 seats in the House of Representatives.

== History ==
=== Origins: 2024 Tokyo Gubernatorial Election ===
The party traces its roots to "Team Anno," a group of volunteers and engineers who gathered around Takahiro Anno during his independent bid for the 2024 Tokyo gubernatorial election. Anno announced his candidacy on June 6, 2024. Although he finished fifth with 154,638 votes—the highest number ever for a candidate in their 30s—his campaign attracted significant attention for its use of AI and digital strategies.

=== Formation and 2025 Upper House election ===
On May 8, 2025, Anno officially established Team Mirai as a political party. In the 2025 Japanese House of Councillors election held in July, the party received 1,517,890 votes (2.6%) in the national proportional representation block. This result secured one seat for Anno and met the legal requirements to be recognized as a national political party under the Political Party Subsidies Act.

Following the election, Anno became a member of the House of Councillors on July 29, 2025. The party established the "Nagata-cho Engineer Team" using party subsidies to develop software for political transparency.

In legislative affairs, the party adopted a "case-by-case" (zezehihi) approach. In October 2025, Anno and Masaaki Taira (LDP) launched a non-partisan study group on AI and Democracy, featuring Audrey Tang as a guest. In December 2025, Team Mirai voted in favor of the supplementary budget proposal alongside the ruling coalition (LDP and Komeito), as well as the Democratic Party for the People (DPP) and Japan Innovation Party, after reaching a policy agreement with the LDP regarding digital transformation (DX) promotion.

=== 2026 general election ===
In the 2026 Japanese general election held on 8 February 2026, Team Mirai fielded 15 candidates across 8 proportional representation blocks. The party campaigned on a goal of winning 5 seats but exceeded expectations by winning 11 seats, receiving over 3.8 million proportional votes nationwide. Notable elected members included former MP Noboru Usami, who returned to the Diet for the first time in 21 years via the Tokyo PR block.

However, the election was not without controversy. During the campaign period on 3 February, it was revealed that the top candidate on the Kinki PR block list had previously served as a sales manager for "alt Inc.", an AI company whose executives had been arrested for accounting fraud. The party stated it had not been informed of this history. The candidate's nomination was cancelled, and they were removed from the list on 5 February.

Consequently, although the party won enough votes for two seats in the Kinki block, it lost those seats to other parties, the Centrist Reform Alliance and Japan Innovation Party. This occurred because the remaining candidates on the list, who were dual-listed in single-member districts, failed to secure the required 10% of the vote to be eligible for proportional reinstatement (sekihairitsu), leaving the list with no eligible candidates to take the seats.

== Policies and digital initiatives ==
Team Mirai advocates for "Digital Democracy" and draws inspiration from the "Plurality" concepts proposed by Audrey Tang and Glen Weyl. A core component of their platform is the "Nagata-cho Engineer Team" (永田町エンジニアチーム), a group funded by political party subsidies to develop software that enhances political transparency and efficiency.

Key projects include:

- Mirai Marumie Political Funds (みらいまる見え政治資金): An open-source tool launched in October 2025 that visualizes political funding flows using Sankey diagrams. It connects with bank accounts and credit cards to provide near real-time transparency.
- Mirai Diet (みらい議会): A web service launched in October 2025 that visualizes Diet deliberations. It uses AI to translate complex bill language into plain Japanese and displays the status of bills.
- AI Fact Checker: An open-source system developed by the party to verify claims on social media. It has also been adopted by Komeito for their own counter-misinformation measures.

The policies of Team Mirai are structured around three pillars—"the future," "the present," and "technology"—based on the slogan "For the future: doing what we can, right now". In order to address Japan's declining population and shrinking economy, the party emphasizes "growth investment" to expand the economic pie—going beyond mere debates on wealth redistribution—and strongly advocates for enhancing the transparency and efficiency of government and politics through the use of digital technology. For the 2026 Japanese general election, the party has put forward the following policies:

=== Economic policy ===
- Child-rearing tax cuts: Proposes a system to reduce parents' income tax rates by a fixed percentage based on the number of children they have. Specific examples include income tax reductions of 5% for one child, 10% for two children, and 20% for three children.
- Fostering New Industries: Prioritize investment in cutting-edge sectors such as AI, robotics, and autonomous driving.
- Investment in Education and Science & Technology: Promote the development of engineers and the infrastructure for basic research by investing in facilities for colleges of technology and increasing operating expense grants for universities.

=== Social policy ===
- Reduction of social insurance premiums: Advocates prioritizing the reduction of social insurance premiums—which place a heavy burden on the working-age population—over cutting the consumption tax, thereby increasing take-home pay.
- Maintenance of the High-Cost Medical Expense Benefit System: Aims to maintain the current system that caps the burden of high medical costs, ensuring a framework where everyone can receive medical treatment with peace of mind.
- Securing funding and medical DX: Aims to design a sustainable system by setting the patient co-payment rate for medical expenses at a standard 30% regardless of age (addressing the impact on low-income individuals through refundable tax credits), promoting the adoption of AI-powered medical devices, and enhancing efficiency through the analysis of medical databases.

=== Domestic policy ===
- Implementation of "push-style" support: Advocating a shift from the traditional "application-based" model to "push-style administration," where the government automatically delivers necessary support. The aim is to reduce the administrative burden of procedures through legal amendments and the establishment of data-sharing infrastructure among local governments.
- Resolving issues regarding money in politics: Visualizing the flow of funds in real-time using a proprietary tool called "Mirai Marumie Political Funds".
- Constitution: Uphold the principles of "popular sovereignty," "respect for fundamental human rights," and "pacifism." Examine the content with a view to potential amendments in response to changing times.

=== Foreign policy ===
- Establish an advanced AI industry and an environment for AI utilization—positioning the nation as an "AI-driven state"—and leverage this as a diplomatic asset.
- Deploy proactive cyber defense measures to safeguard the nation amidst escalating threats.
- Adjust defense capabilities appropriately in response to changes in the security environment.

== Leaders ==
Position	Name	House
Leader	Takahiro Anno	Senate
Secretary General	Aoi Furukawa	Representatives
Chairperson of the Policy Research Council	Michio Kawai	Representatives
Chairperson of the Diet Affairs Committee	Satoshi Takayama	Representatives
Chairperson of the Election Strategy Committee	Misa Maeda	non-member
Chairperson of the Organization and Movement Headquarters	Eitarō Suda	Representatives
Chairperson of the Public Relations Headquarters	Yūya Mineshima	Representatives
Chairperson of the General Affairs Headquarters	Akari Matsuo	non-member
Chairperson of the Development Headquarters	Kenta Murai	non-member
Chairperson of the Broad Listening Headquarters	Naoki Katō	non-member

=== List of leaders ===
No.	Leader (birth–death)	Constituency	Took office	Left office	Election results	Prime Minister (term)
1	Takahiro Anno (b. 1990)	National PR	8 May 2025	Incumbent	N/A	Ishiba 2024–25
1	Takahiro Anno (b. 1990)	National PR	8 May 2025	Incumbent	N/A	Takaichi 2025–present

== Election results ==
=== House of Representatives ===
Election	Leader	Constituency			Party list			Seats		Position	Status
Election	Leader	Votes	%	Seats	Votes	%	Seats	Total	+/-	Position	Status
2026	Takahiro Anno	156,853	0.28%	0 / 289	3,813,749	6.66%	11 / 176	11 / 465	New	6th	Opposition

=== Senate ===
Election	Leader	Constituency			Party list			Seats				Position	Status
Election	Leader	Votes	%	Seats	Votes	%	Seats	Election	+/-	Total	+/-	Position	Status
2025	Takahiro Anno	956,674	1.62	0 / 75	1,517,890	2.6	1 / 50	1 / 125	New	1 / 248	New	11th	Opposition
