= Saria Hino =

Japanese politician (born 1987)

- 日野 紗里亜

Member of the House of Representatives
- Incumbent
- Assumed office 29 October 2024
- Preceded by: Junji Suzuki
- Constituency: Aichi 7th

Personal details
- Born: 26 November 1987 (age 38) Tokyo, Japan
- Party: DPP
- Education: Aichi Gakuin University

Saria Hino (日野紗里亜, Hino Saria; born 26 November 1987) is a Japanese politician serving as a member of the House of Representatives since 2024. She is the CEO of a nursing home company.
