= Junji Suzuki =

Japanese politician

- 鈴木 淳司
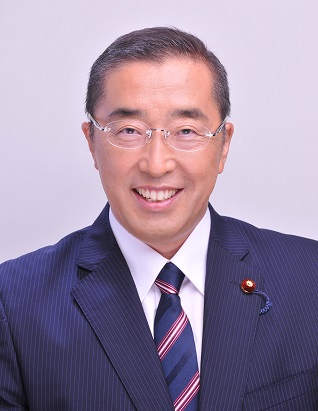
- Official portrait, 2018

Minister for Internal Affairs and Communications
- In office 13 September 2023 – 14 December 2023
- Prime Minister: Fumio Kishida
- Preceded by: Takeaki Matsumoto
- Succeeded by: Takeaki Matsumoto

Member of the House of Representatives
- Incumbent
- Assumed office 9 February 2026
- Constituency: Tōkai PR
- In office 18 December 2012 – 9 October 2024
- Preceded by: Shiori Yamao
- Succeeded by: Saria Hino
- Constituency: Aichi 7th (2012–2014); Tōkai PR (2014–2021); Aichi 7th (2021–2024)
- In office 10 November 2003 – 21 July 2009
- Preceded by: Multi-member district
- Succeeded by: Shiori Yamao
- Constituency: Tōkai PR (2003–2005); Aichi 7th (2005–2009)

Member of the Seto City Council
- In office 1991–1999

Personal details
- Born: 7 April 1958 (age 68) Seto, Aichi, Japan
- Party: Liberal Democratic
- Education: Waseda University

Junji Suzuki (鈴木 淳司, Suzuki Junji; born 7 April 1958) is a former Japanese politician who served as the Minister for Internal Affairs and Communications in the Second Kishida Cabinet from September to December 2023. He also served in House of Representatives as a member of the Liberal Democratic Party. A native of Seto, Aichi and graduate of Waseda University, he was elected for the first time in 2003 after an unsuccessful run in 2000. He was defeated in the 2009 election by DPJ candidate Shiori Yamao. He was then elected again in 2012 but lost his seat in 2024.

Political offices
Preceded by Takeaki Matsumoto	Minister for Internal Affairs and Communications; 2023	Succeeded by Takeaki Matsumoto
