= Jesús Fukasaku =

Japanese politician (born 1985)

- 深作 ヘスス
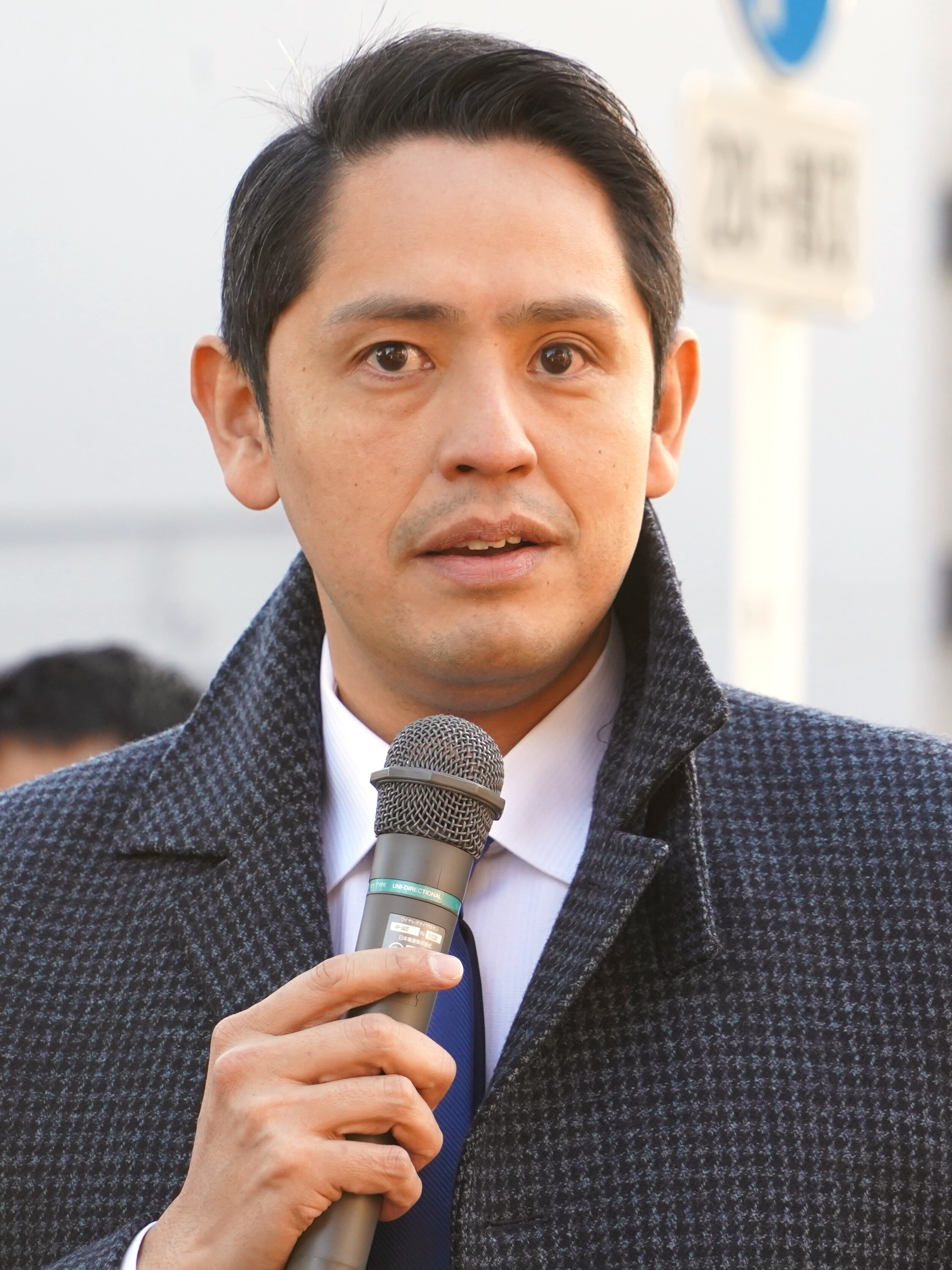
- Fukasaku in 2025

Member of the House of Representatives
- Incumbent
- Assumed office 1 November 2024
- Constituency: Southern Kanto PR

Personal details
- Born: 4 January 1985 (age 41) Lima, Peru
- Party: DPP
- Relatives: Seijirō Fukasaku (grandfather)
- Education: Seikei University

Jesús Fukasaku (深作ヘスス, Fukasaku Jesús; born 4 January 1985) is a Peruvian-born Japanese politician serving as a member of the House of Representatives since 2024. He is the grandson of perennial candidate Seijirō Fukasaku and is related to filmmaker Kenta Fukasaku.
