= Takahiro Anno =

Japanese politician (born 1990)

- 安野 貴博
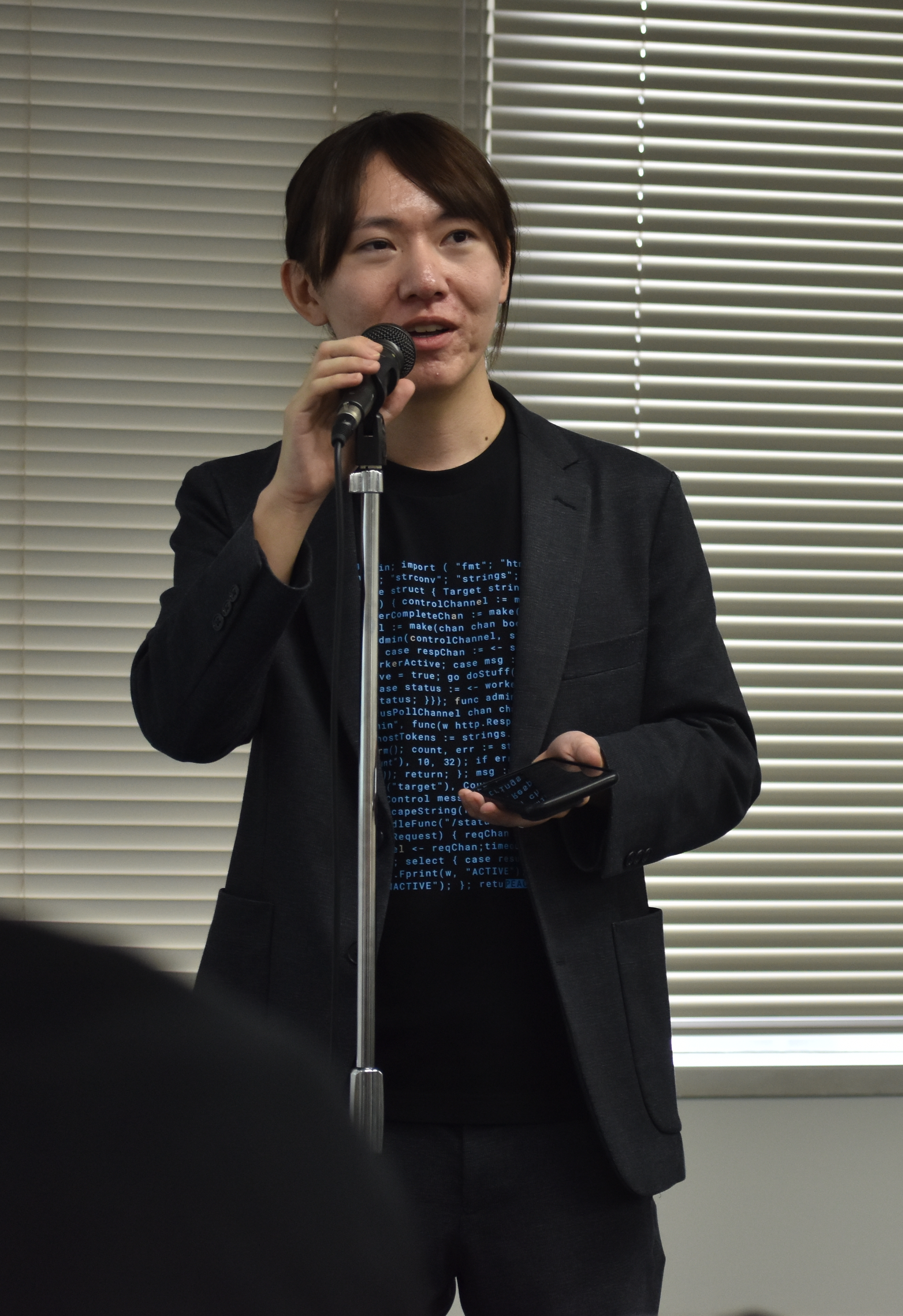
- Anno in 2025

Member of the House of Councillors
- Incumbent
- Assumed office 1 August 2025
- Constituency: National PR

Leader of Team Mirai
- Incumbent
- Assumed office 8 May 2025
- Preceded by: Position established

Personal details
- Born: 1 December 1990 (age 35) Bunkyō, Tokyo, Japan
- Party: Team Mirai (since 2025)
- Other political affiliations: Independent (2024)
- Education: School of Engineering, University of Tokyo; Royal College of Art

Takahiro Anno (Japanese: 安野 貴博, Hepburn: Anno Takahiro; born 1 December 1990) is a Japanese politician, writer, AI engineer and scientist who serves in the House of Councillors and founded Team Mirai. He was elected as Team Mirai's only seat in the 2025 Japanese House of Councillors election.

Anno graduated from the University of Tokyo School of Engineering with a focus on Artificial Intelligence in 2014. He joined the Boston Consulting Group after, and would go on to found several companies focusing on the use of AI for business, such as BEDORE and MNTSQ. He also became an aspiring science fiction writer, winning awards for several of his short stories, such as "Continuous Integration". He was inducted into the Science Fiction and Fantasy Writers of Japan in 2022 after his novel "Circuit Switcher" was published.

Anno began his political activities when he ran for Governor of Tokyo in 2024. He placed fifth, and then founded Team Mirai to contest the 2025 Councillor elections. The party won a seat with an estimated 2.3% of the vote, and met the legal requirement to become a political party.

== Biography ==
=== Early life ===
Anno was born on 1 December 1990, in Bunkyō, Tokyo. He graduated from Kaisei Academy, and then attended the School of Engineering, University of Tokyo. He was a member of the laboratory of Yutaka Matsuo. He graduated from Tokyo University in 2014.

=== Engineering ===
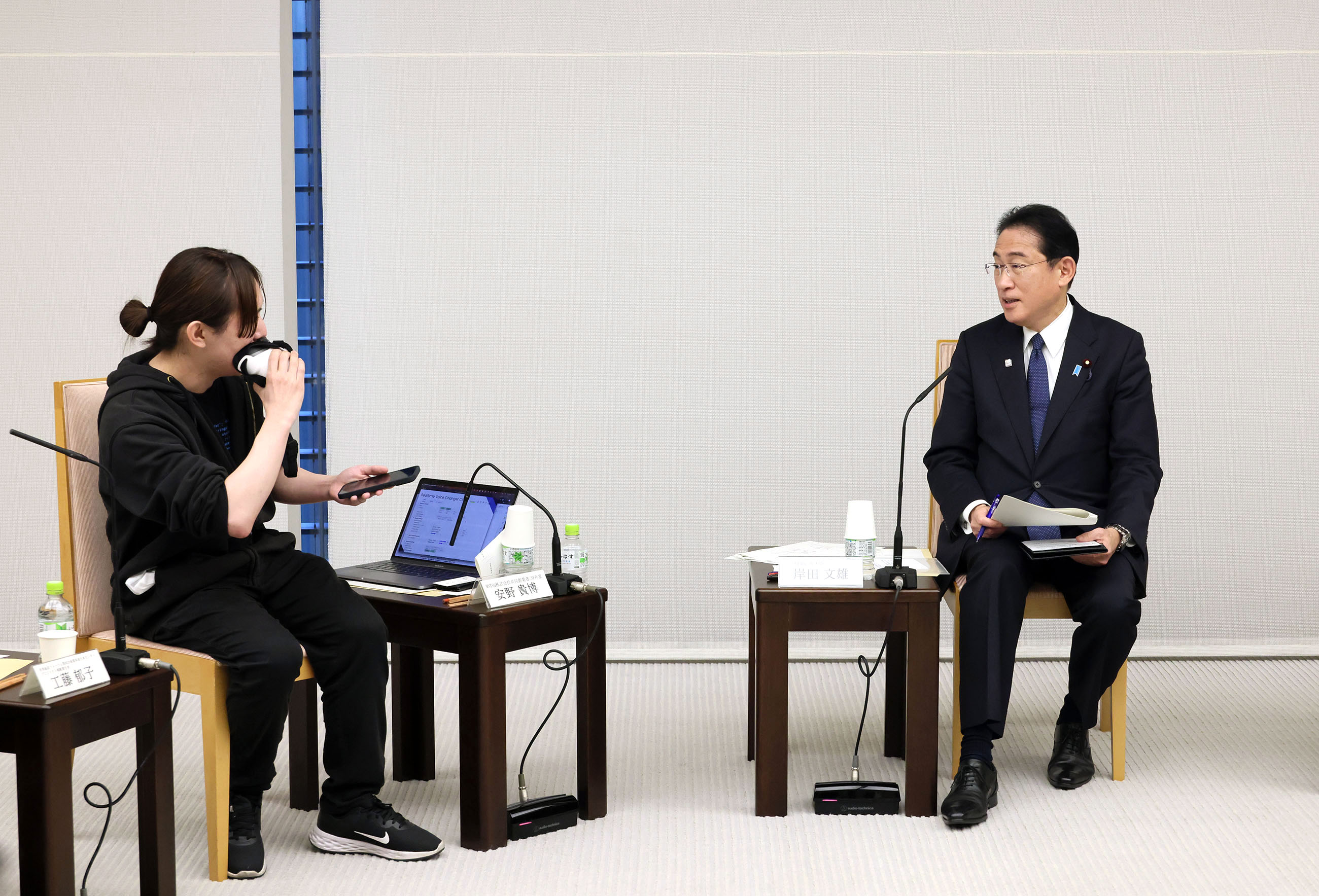
Anno meeting with PM Fumio Kishida to discuss AI in 2023

Anno got his first job at the Boston Consulting Group in 2015. He participated in a human and robot duo with Pepper as a team engineer. In the M-1 Grand Prix later that year, he made it past the first round, and did so again in 2016.

In 2016, he was appointed as the representative of BEDORE, a subsidiary of PKSHA Technology, which mainly focuses on developing algorithms to assist businesses. Two years later Anno would go on to co-found MNTSQ, a legal tech help company. With investments from several firms, such as Nishimura & Asahi and Nagashima Ohno & Tsunematsu, the company would go on to help notable corporations such as Mitsubishi and Hitachi.

Anno also graduated from the Royal College of Art in 2022 with a degree exploring the way in AI art. He received a bachelor's degree upon returning to Japan in equivalence. He was then elected as a member of the Digital Legislation working group inside the Digital Agency. Anno would go on to win several awards in AI art the following year. He met Prime Minister Fumio Kishida on 9 May 2023, who also attended Kaisei Academy in Tokyo. He exchanged opinions with Kishida on artificial intelligence, and showed Kishida an imitation of his voice using AI.

He made an appearance on NHK's Close-up Gendai in 2022 as a writer and AI engineer. He was appointed as an advisor to GovTech Tokyo in November 2024, a foundation attempting to work on digital transformation in Tokyo. He launched "Digital Democracy 2030" in January 2025, an experimental project using AI for politics. GovTech Tokyo switched to focusing solely to advise on the use of AI from the broader field in February.

=== Writing ===
In 2019, Anno published his first science fiction short story, "Continuous Integration". He later won the Excellence Award at The Hoshi Awards, an open-air literary prize for short stories. He was congratulated by the physicist Hirosi Ooguri for the quality of the work, and was approached by the editor of Hayakawa Publishing to write a full-length novel.

In 2021, he won the ninth Hayakawa SF Contest for "Circuit Switcher", his upcoming full-length novel, which focused on the theme of automated driving. The selection committee included noted novelists such as Hiroki Azuma. The book released fully on 19 January 2022, as published by Hayakawa Publishing. Hideo Kojima recommended the novel and gave it "5 out of 5 stars".

He joined the Science Fiction and Fantasy Writers of Japan in May 2022 along with Hotate Shinkawa and Yūki Shasendō.

=== Politics ===
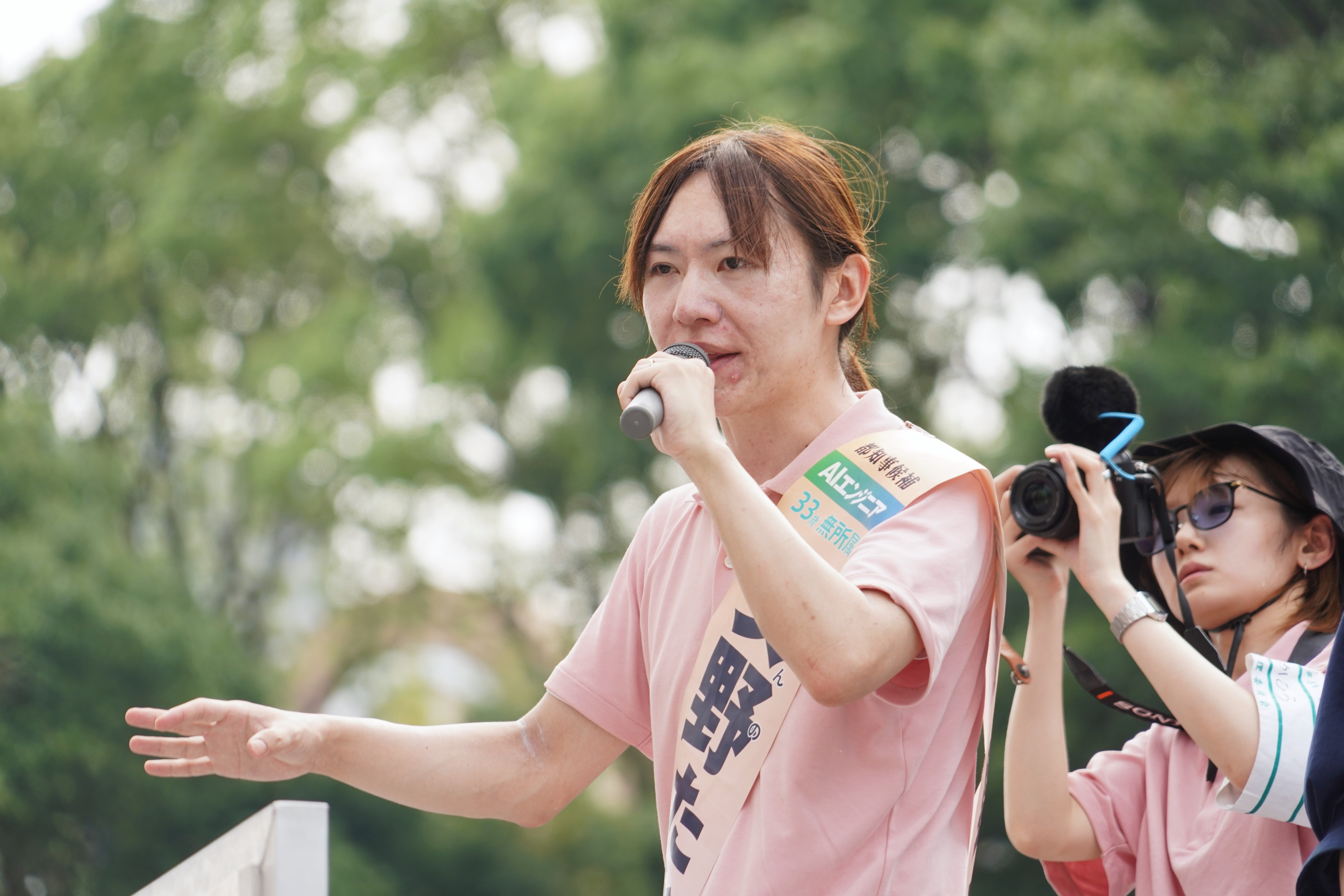
Anno campaigning for the 2024 Tokyo gubernatorial election

He ran in the 2024 Tokyo gubernatorial election, announcing his intention to do so at a press conference on 6 June. He received 154,638 votes, finishing fifth behind Yuriko Koike, Shinji Ishimaru, Renhō, and Toshio Tamogami. It was the highest number of votes ever received for a candidate in his thirties. Anno was effectively treated as a "bubble candidate", a candidate with little chance of performing well, which limited his press coverage.

On 8 May 2025, he announced the establishment of Team Mirai, a new political party that planned to run in the 2025 Japanese House of Councillors election. Fifteen candidates ran across both the proportional and prefectural districts. The average age of candidates ran by the party was 35, and many of them were previous supporters of Anno in the Tokyo gubernatorial election. Early predictions gave no chance for the party to win a seat, but later predictions were more optimistic, including the possibility of winning a seat in the JNN predictions on 17 July.

As a result of the vote, Mirai had won one seat on the proportional district with 2.6% of the vote, and Anno's own election had been assured. NHK immediately predicted Mirai would win a seat upon poll closing. When news of the election was announced, Anno bowed, saying that "[I'd] heard that it would take a little more time, so I was happy and unexpected". In addition, the 2.6% of the vote the party received guaranteed the party would meet the political party requirements. They also placed above the SDP.

== Controversy ==
=== Asthma treatment ===
On 17 June 2025, Anno posted a question about if the exemption of asthma medication from insurance coverage was appropriate. Anno said "Insurance will not cover people who take stopgap medication when they have an attack, despite not taking any preventative measures," and proposed "a medical system that can balance fair medical cost reduction with the health of patients". The post was heavily criticized, with people expressing concern on Team Mirai's expertise on medical topics and issues of life and death.

Anno issued an apology on 25 June 2025, stating that he had never intended to make asthma patients uneasy. He reflected on the fact "tough choices" must be made in regards to the healthcare system due to the large population of elder patients, and the fact that Japan needed to redistribute its healthcare system in a realistic burden system to help people who need care the most.

=== AI fact-checker ===
Anno developed an "AI fact-checker" that was introduced in part by Komeito, but experts in the fact-checking field criticized that it deviated from the norm of non-partisanship, as required by the International Fact-Checking organization. They took issue with the operation of the system by a party from the ruling coalition, claiming it may suppress speech and democracy going into the future. Anno said "I do not believe that it will directly lead to suppression of speech".

== Personal life ==
Anno has expressed interest in popular media such as the anime series Hunter × Hunter and Neon Genesis Evangelion, as well as the Metal Gear video game series.

== Published works ==
=== Business books ===
- 1% Revolution (Bungeishunjū, 6 February 2025)

=== Novels ===
- Circuit Switcher (Hayakawa Publishing, 19 January 2022)

=== Short stories ===
- Continuous Integration (Nikkei "Hoshi Achievement Award")
- Freefall (Hayakawa Bunko JA "SF of 2084")
- Pure Human Art (S-F Magazine, February 2023 Issue)
- Secret Prompt (Hayakawa Bunko JA "AI and SF")
- Deep Facers (Shueisha, June 2023)
