= 2026 Japanese general election in Tokai =

- 8 February 2026

All 54 seats to the House of Representatives
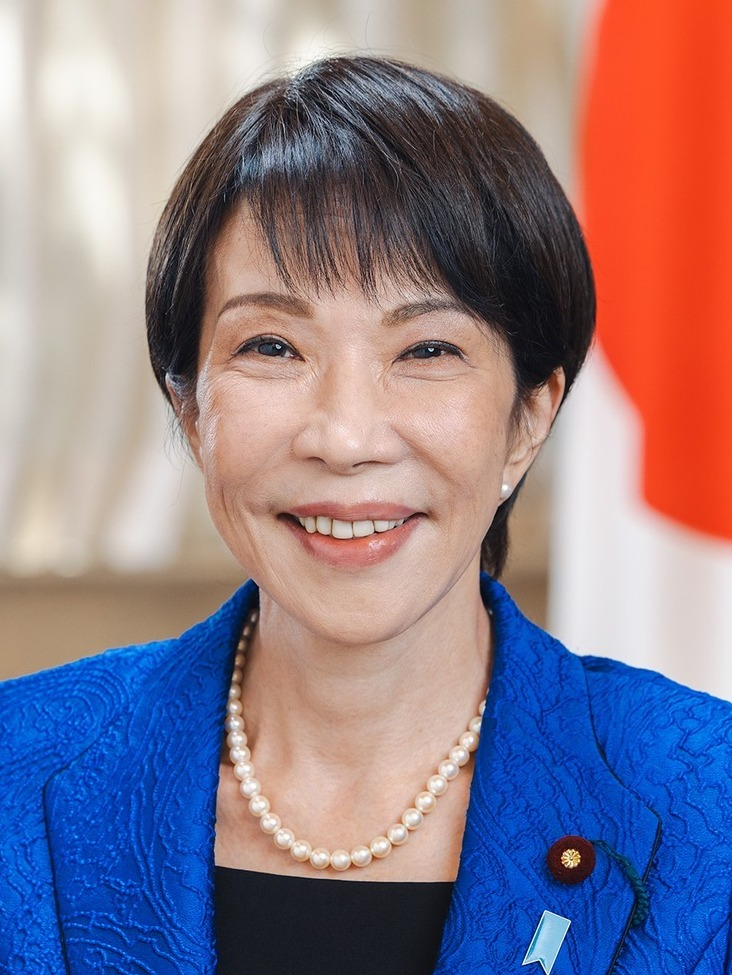

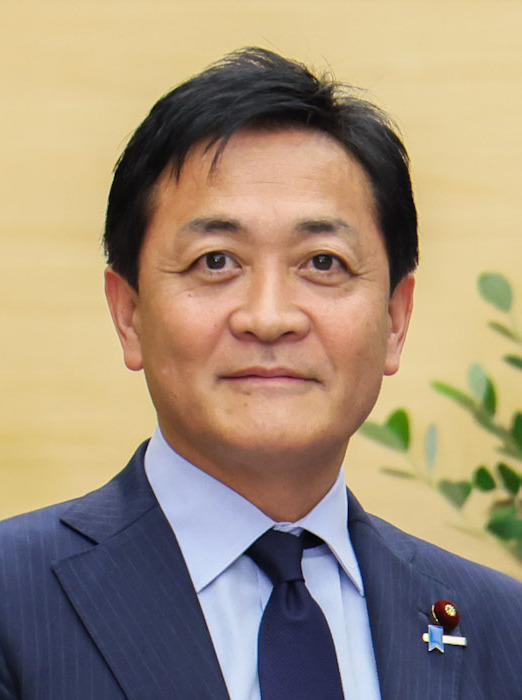

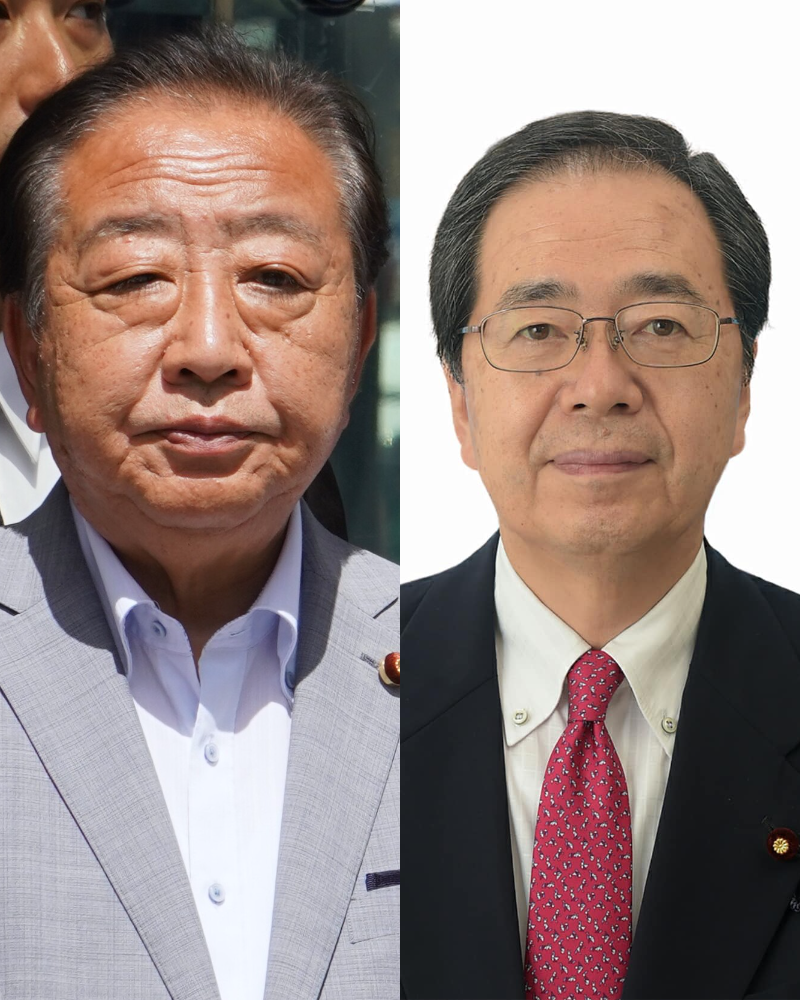

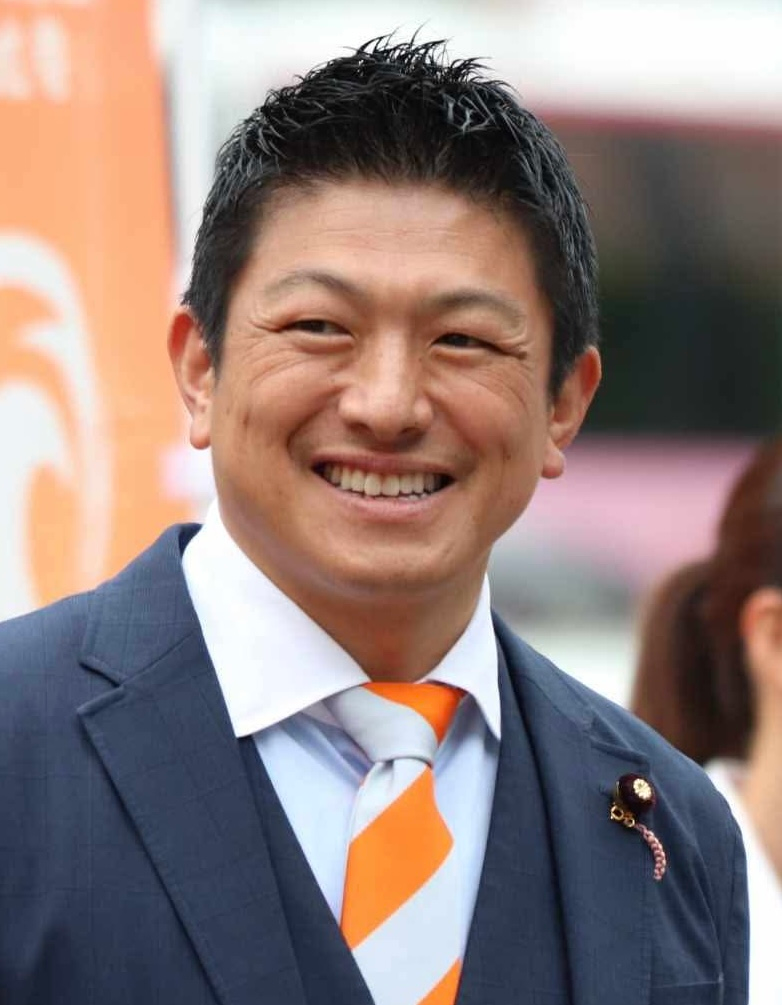

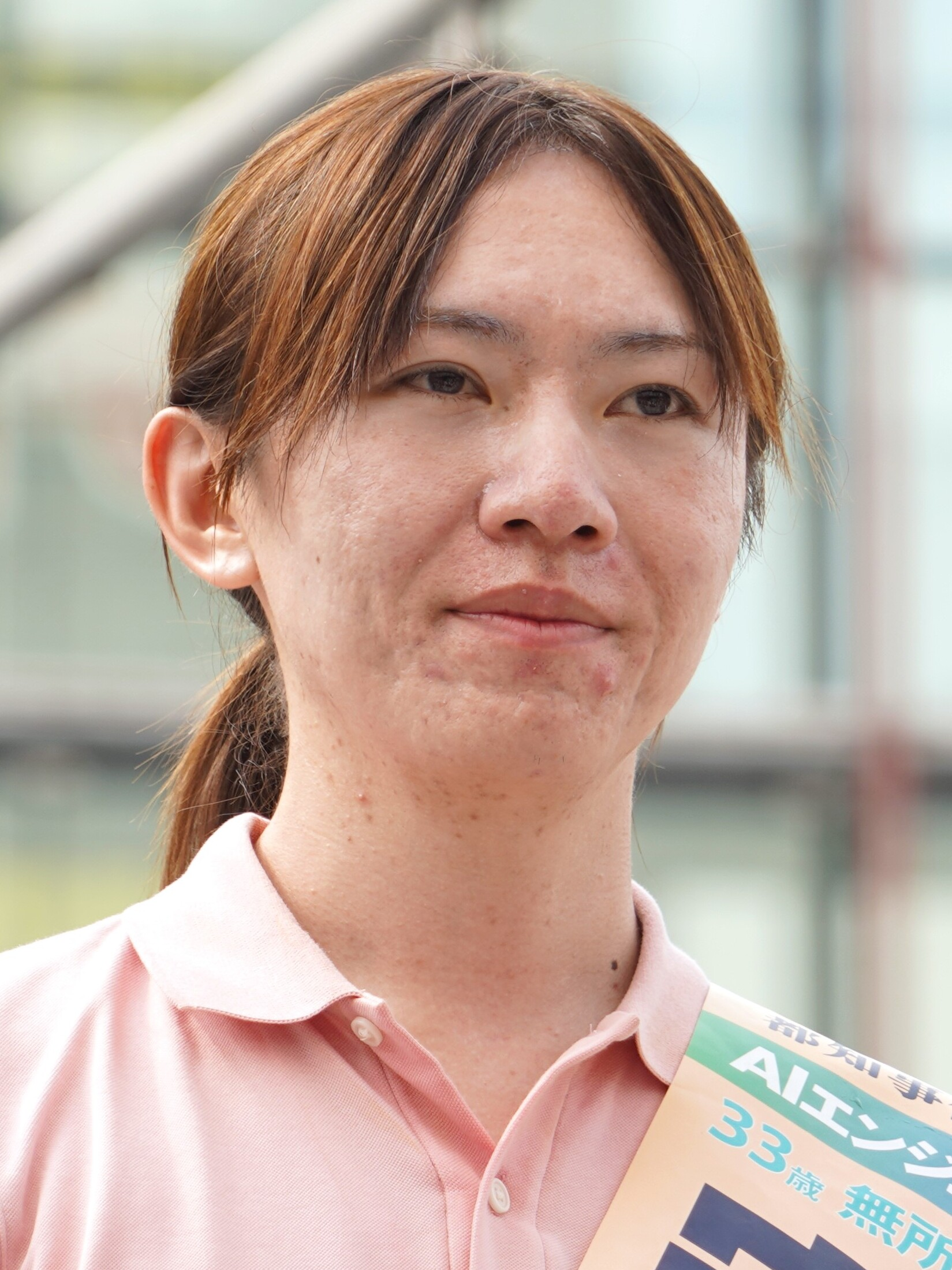

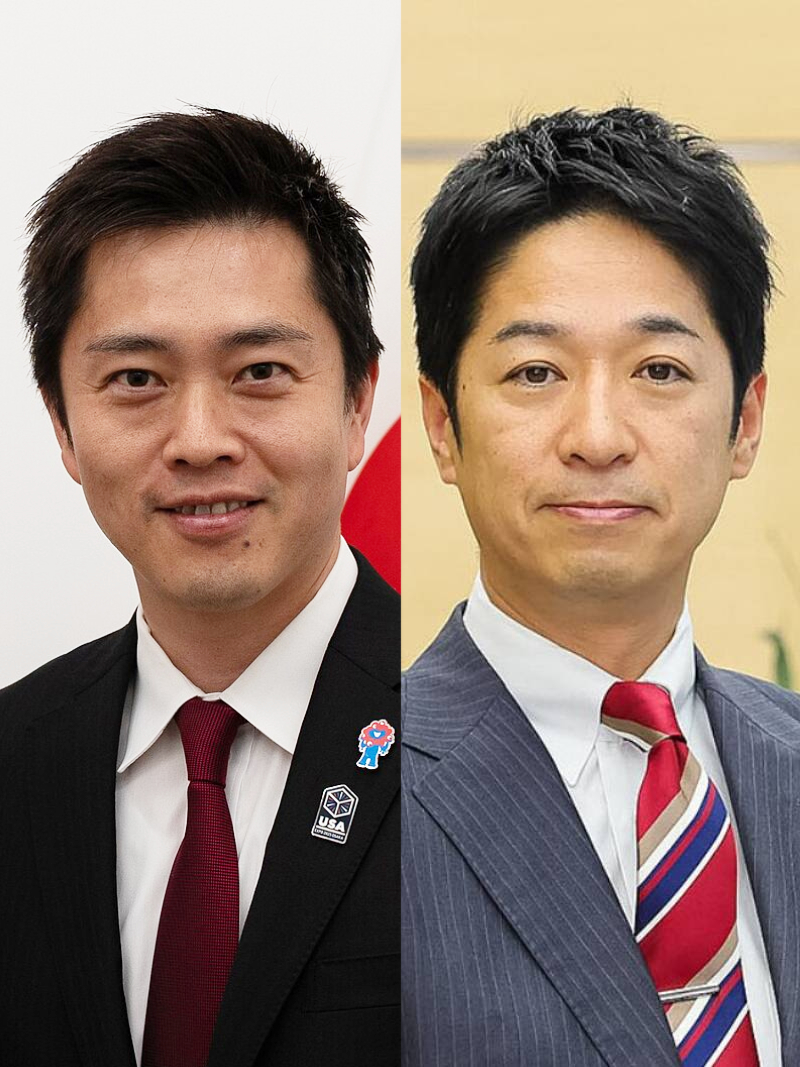

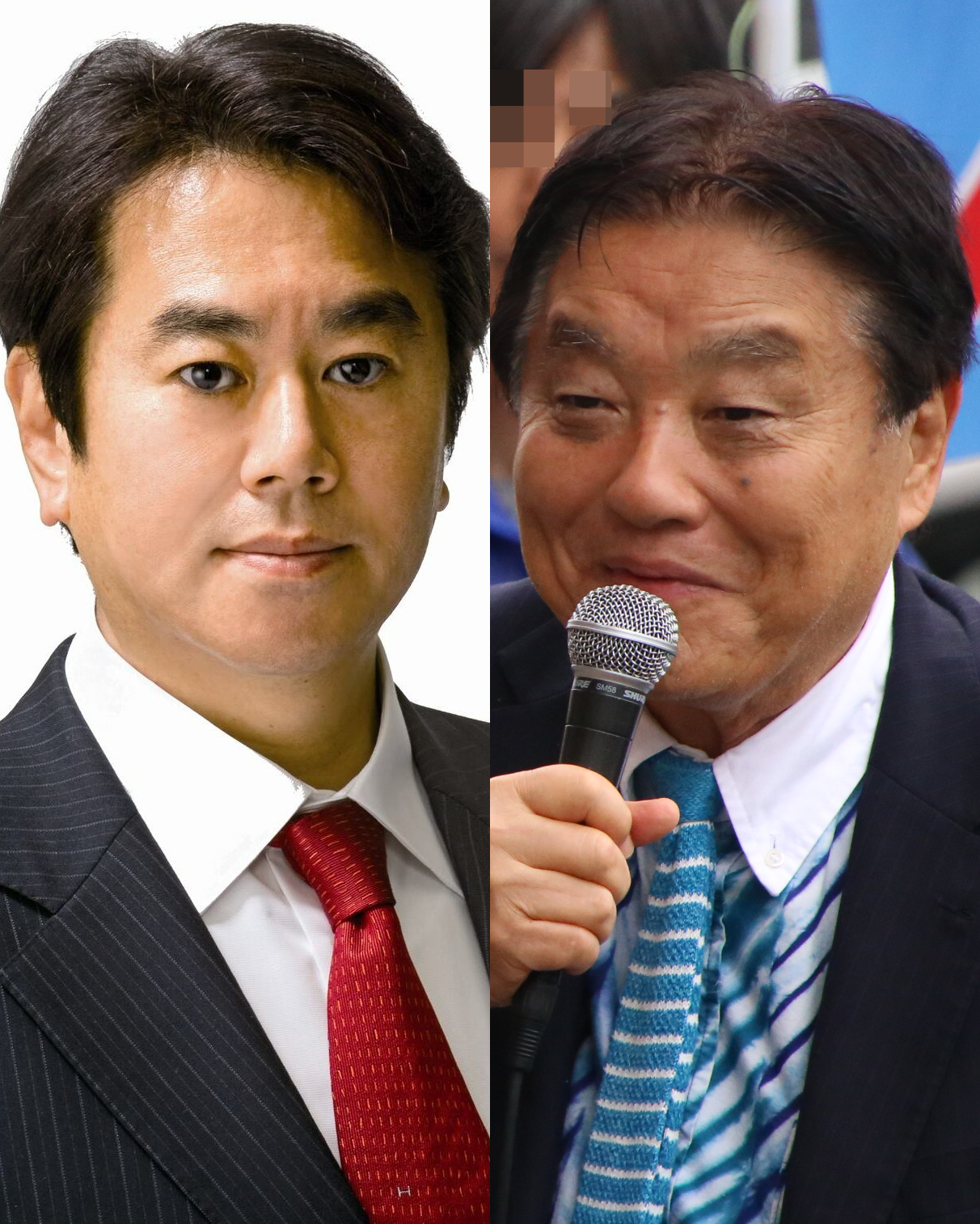
	Majority party	Minority party	Third party
Party	LDP	DPP	Centrist Reform
Last election	20 seats	6 seats	22 seats (Note: As CDP and Komeito)
Constituency	29	3	0
Constituency vote	3,538,979; 51.21%	780,820; 11.30%	1,487,156; 21.52%
PR seats	10	3	4
Regional vote	2,628,018; 37.65%	836,102; 11.98%	1,199,580; 17.19%
Total	39	6	4
Seat change	▲19	0	▼18
	Fourth party	Fifth party	Sixth party
Party	Sanseitō	Team Mirai	Ishin
Last election	0 seats	Did not exist	1 seat
Constituency	0	–	0
Constituency vote	426,538; 6.17%	–	138,319; 2.00%
PR seats	2	1	1
Regional vote	527,293; 7.56%	478,316; 6.85%	400,964; 5.74%
Total	2	1	1
Seat change	▲2	▲1	0
	Seventh party
Party	Genzei–Yukoku
Last election	Did not exist
Constituency	1
Constituency vote	236,102; 3.42%
PR seats	0
Regional vote	209,174; 3.00%
Total	1
Seat change	▲1

This page contains the detailed results for the 2026 Japanese general election in the Tokai proportional representation block.

The Tokai block covers the prefectures of Gifu, Shizuoka, Aichi, and Mie and elects 21 members by party-list proportional representation. In addition to the block seats, Tokai has 33 constituencies each electing a single member by first-past-the-post voting.

== Overall results ==
Party	Constituency			Proportional			Total seats
Party	Votes	%	Seats	Votes	%	Seats	Total seats
Liberal Democratic Party	3,538,979	51.21	29	2,628,018	37.65	10	39
Centrist Reform Alliance	1,487,156	21.51	0	1,199,580	17.19	4	4
Democratic Party For the People	780,820	1.30	3	836,102	11.98	3	6
Sanseito	426,538	6.17	0	527,293	7.56	2	2
Team Mirai				478,316	6.85	1	1
Nippon Ishin no Kai	138,319	2.00	0	400,964	5.74	1	1
Japanese Communist Party	174,709	2.53	0	241,848	3.47	0	0
Reiwa Shinsengumi	47,201	0.68	0	218,838	3.14	0	0
Tax Cuts Japan and Yukoku Alliance	236,102	3.42	1	209,174	3.00	0	1
Conservative Party of Japan	49,303	0.71	0	175,506	2.51	0	0
Social Democratic Party	10,996	0.16	0	63,729	0.91	0	0
Independents	20,732	0.24	0				0
Total	6,910,855	100.00	33	6,979,368	100.00	21	54
Invalid/blank votes							
Voter turnout							
Registered voters							

== Single-member constituencies ==
Single-member constituency results in Tokai
Constituency	Previous member		Elected member		Votes	%	Margin	Status
Gifu 1st	Seiko Noda	LDP	Seiko Noda	LDP	90,249	55.8	53,592	LDP hold
Gifu 2nd	Yasufumi Tanahashi	LDP	Yasufumi Tanahashi	LDP	87,826	54.6	43,147	LDP hold
Gifu 3rd	Yoji Muto	LDP	Yoji Muto	LDP	118,346	53.4	67,325	LDP hold
Gifu 4th	Masato Imai	CRA	Tomohiro Kato	LDP	103,054	50.7	23,578	LDP gain from CRA
Gifu 5th	Keiji Furuya	LDP	Keiji Furuya	LDP	83,214	52.1	45,584	LDP hold
Shizuoka 1st	Yōko Kamikawa	LDP	Yōko Kamikawa	LDP	127,488	61.1	65,998	LDP hold
Shizuoka 2nd	Tatsunori Ibayashi	LDP	Tatsunori Ibayashi	LDP	152,012	71.1	90,097	LDP hold
Shizuoka 3rd	Nobuhiro Koyama	CRA	Yuzo Yamamoto	LDP	117,738	51.8	41,229	LDP gain from CRA
Shizuoka 4th	Ken Tanaka	DPFP	Yoichi Fukazawa	LDP	87,880	51.7	26,089	LDP gain from DPFP
Shizuoka 5th	Goshi Hosono	LDP	Goshi Hosono	LDP	168,511	74.8	125,094	LDP hold
Shizuoka 6th	Shu Watanabe	CRA	Takaaki Katsumata	LDP	125,829	54.6	41,103	LDP gain from CRA
Shizuoka 7th	Minoru Kiuchi	LDP	Minoru Kiuchi	LDP	129,336	67.7	83,847	LDP hold
Shizuoka 8th	Kentaro Genma	CRA	Daisuke Inaba	LDP	114,256	50.0	31,899	LDP gain from CRA
Aichi 1st	Takashi Kawamura	Genyu	Takashi Kawamura	Genyu	94,339	42.5	22,195	Genyu hold
Aichi 2nd	Motohisa Furukawa	DPFP	Motohisa Furukawa	DPFP	110,540	49.1	35,695	DPFP hold
Aichi 3rd	Shoichi Kondo	CRA	Yoshihiko Mizuno	LDP	98,388	40.8	27,924	LDP gain from CRA
Aichi 4th	Yoshio Maki	CRA	Shozo Kudo	LDP	79,204	41.7	28,632	LDP gain from CRA
Aichi 5th	Atsushi Nishikawa	CRA	Yasuhiro Okamoto	LDP	73,643	41.7	29,355	LDP gain from CRA
Aichi 6th	Hideki Niwa	LDP	Hideki Niwa	LDP	109,044	54.1	69,216	LDP hold
Aichi 7th	Saria Hino	DPFP	Saria Hino	DPFP	108,322	49.8	13,349	DPFP hold
Aichi 8th	Yutaka Banno	CRA	Tadahiko Ito	LDP	131,050	52.8	46,479	LDP gain from CRA
Aichi 9th	Mitsunori Okamoto	CRA	Yasumasa Nagasaka	LDP	93,351	45.1	35,267	LDP gain from CRA
Aichi 10th	Norimasa Fujiwara	CRA	Shinji Wakayama	LDP	80,646	42.1	37,150	LDP gain from CRA
Aichi 11th	Midori Tanno	DPFP	Midori Tanno	DPFP	145,739	59.7	47,328	DPFP hold
Aichi 12th	Kazuhiko Shigetoku	CRA	Shuhei Aoyama	LDP	128,453	47.0	21,323	LDP gain from CRA
Aichi 13th	Kensuke Onishi	CRA	Taku Ishii	LDP	151,944	58.6	57,545	LDP gain from CRA
Aichi 14th	Soichiro Imaeda	LDP	Soichiro Imaeda	LDP	119,376	67.4	69,623	LDP hold
Aichi 15th	Yukinori Nemoto	LDP	Yukinori Nemoto	LDP	88,028	43.6	51,414	LDP hold
Aichi 16th	Toru Fukuta	DPFP	Shizuo Yamashita	LDP	91,375	40.9	31,291	LDP gain from DPFP
Mie 1st	Norihisa Tamura	LDP	Norihisa Tamura	LDP	124,762	66.3	71,742	LDP hold
Mie 2nd	Kosuke Shimono	CRA	Hideto Kawasaki	LDP	117,495	52.5	39,377	LDP gain from CRA
Mie 3rd	Katsuya Okada	CRA	Masataka Ishihara	LDP	99,392	42.1	8,691	LDP gain from CRA
Mie 4th	Eikei Suzuki	LDP	Eikei Suzuki	LDP	106,718	66.5	63,702	LDP hold

=== Gifu Prefecture ===
Gifu Prefecture
Party	Constituency			Proportional	
Party	Votes	%	Seats	Votes	%
Liberal Democratic Party	482,689	53.21	5	375,047	40.93
Centrist Reform Alliance	153,763	16.95	0	158,556	17.30
Democratic Party For the People	123,277	13.59	0	91,137	9.95
Sanseito	84,439	9.31	0	75,280	8.22
Team Mirai				56,397	6.15
Nippon Ishin no Kai	11,268	1.24	0	49,645	5.42
Reiwa Shinsengumi	28,872	3.18	0	32,970	3.60
Japanese Communist Party	8,658	0.95	0	30,150	3.29
Conservative Party of Japan				20,161	2.20
Social Democratic Party				7,722	0.84
Tax Cuts Japan and Yukoku Alliance				19,278	2.10
Independents	14,245	1.57	0		
Total	907,211	100.00	5	916,343	100.00
Invalid/blank votes					
Voter turnout					
Registered voters					

Gifu 1st district
Party	Candidate	Constituency		Proportional	
Party	Candidate	Votes	%	Votes	%
Liberal Democratic Party	Seiko Noda	90,249	55.81	60,484	37.02
Centrist Reform Alliance	Manabu Hattori	36,657	22.67	30,058	18.40
Democratic Party For the People				15,628	9.57
Sanseito	Mayura Narui	26,146	16.17	14,209	8.70
Team Mirai				12,445	7.62
Nippon Ishin no Kai				9,601	5.88
Japanese Communist Party	Junko Hatano	8,658	5.35	6,212	3.80
Reiwa Shinsengumi				5,551	3.40
Conservative Party of Japan				4,197	2.57
Tax Cuts Japan and Yukoku Alliance				3,643	2.23
Social Democratic Party				1,354	0.83
Total		161,710	100.00	163,382	100.00
Invalid/blank votes					
Voter turnout			50.13		
Registered voters		329,763		329,763	
LDP hold					

Gifu 2nd district
Party	Candidate	Constituency		Proportional	
Party	Candidate	Votes	%	Votes	%
Liberal Democratic Party	Yasufumi Tanahashi	87,826	54.57	70,135	42.95
Centrist Reform Alliance				23,555	14.43
Democratic Party For the People	Miho Nomura	44,679	27.76	19,320	11.83
Sanseito	Masaya Tsukahara	14,203	8.82	13,136	8.04
Team Mirai				9,591	5.87
Nippon Ishin no Kai				8,993	5.51
Independent	Rie Karasawa	7,663	4.76		
Independent	Ayumi Ito	6,582	4.09		
Reiwa Shinsengumi				5,381	3.30
Japanese Communist Party				5,085	3.11
Conservative Party of Japan				3,510	2.15
Tax Cuts Japan and Yukoku Alliance				3,213	1.97
Social Democratic Party				1,364	0.84
Total		160,953	100.00	163,283	100.00
Invalid/blank votes					
Voter turnout			57.47		
Registered voters		288,264		288,264	
LDP hold					

Gifu 3rd district
Party	Candidate	Constituency		Proportional	
Party	Candidate	Votes	%	Votes	%
Liberal Democratic Party	Yoji Muto	118,346	53.44	91,006	40.30
Centrist Reform Alliance				34,993	15.50
Democratic Party For the People	Akihiro Senda	51,021	23.04	24,748	10.96
Reiwa Shinsengumi	Naoto Sakaguchi	28,872	13.04	10,469	4.64
Sanseito	Keisuke Ito	23,204	10.48	19,523	8.65
Team Mirai				14,393	6.37
Nippon Ishin no Kai				12,386	5.49
Japanese Communist Party				6,425	2.85
Conservative Party of Japan				5,192	2.30
Tax Cuts Japan and Yukoku Alliance				4,965	2.20
Social Democratic Party				1,713	0.76
Total		221,443	100.00	225,813	100.00
Invalid/blank votes					
Voter turnout			56.60		
Registered voters		403,953		403,953	
LDP hold					

Gifu 4th district
Party	Candidate	Constituency		Proportional	
Party	Candidate	Votes	%	Votes	%
Liberal Democratic Party	Tomohiro Kato	103,054	50.66	91,793	45.14
Centrist Reform Alliance	Masato Imai	79,476	39.07	39,839	19.59
Sanseito	Yusuke Soga	20,886	10.27	16,518	8.12
Democratic Party For the People				14,598	7.18
Team Mirai				10,236	5.03
Nippon Ishin no Kai				8,886	4.37
Reiwa Shinsengumi				6,303	3.10
Japanese Communist Party				5,723	2.81
Tax Cuts Japan and Yukoku Alliance				3,988	1.96
Conservative Party of Japan				3,815	1.88
Social Democratic Party				1,657	0.81
Total		203,416	100.00	203,356	100.00
Invalid/blank votes					
Voter turnout			65.46		
Registered voters		315,263		315,263	
LDP hold					

Gifu 5th district
Party	Candidate	Constituency		Proportional	
Party	Candidate	Votes	%	Votes	%
Liberal Democratic Party	Keiji Furuya	83,214	52.11	61,629	38.40
Centrist Reform Alliance	Satoshi Mano	37,630	23.56	30,111	18.76
Democratic Party For the People	Mototaka Yoshida	27,577	17.27	16,843	10.49
Sanseito				11,894	7.41
Nippon Ishin no Kai	Ryoji Yamada	11,268	7.06	9,779	6.09
Team Mirai				9,732	6.06
Japanese Communist Party				6,705	4.18
Reiwa Shinsengumi				5,266	3.28
Tax Cuts Japan and Yukoku Alliance				3,469	2.16
Conservative Party of Japan				3,447	2.15
Social Democratic Party				1,634	1.02
Total		159,689	100.00	160,509	100.00
Invalid/blank votes					
Voter turnout			62.61		
Registered voters		259,894		259,894	
LDP hold					

=== Shizuoka Prefecture ===
Shizuoka Prefecture
Party	Constituency			Proportional	
Party	Votes	%	Seats	Votes	%
Liberal Democratic Party	1,023,050	60.34	8	665,801	38.84
Centrist Reform Alliance	348,924	20.58	0	288,323	16.82
Democratic Party For the People	168,770	9.95	0	247,894	14.46
Sanseito	96,413	5.69	0	125,151	7.30
Team Mirai				112,909	6.59
Nippon Ishin no Kai				80,430	4.69
Japanese Communist Party	49,696	2.93	0	57,911	3.38
Reiwa Shinsengumi	8,494	0.50	0	57,719	3.37
Conservative Party of Japan				40,390	2.36
Tax Cuts Japan and Yukoku Alliance				21,909	1.28
Social Democratic Party				15,670	0.91
Total	1,695,347	100.00	8	1,714,107	100.00
Invalid/blank votes					
Voter turnout					
Registered voters					

Shizuoka 1st district
Party	Candidate	Constituency		Proportional	
Party	Candidate	Votes	%	Votes	%
Liberal Democratic Party	Yōko Kamikawa	127,488	61.15	76,274	36.05
Centrist Reform Alliance				32,909	15.55
Democratic Party For the People	Shohei Shibata	61,490	29.49	32,729	15.47
Team Mirai				16,799	7.94
Sanseito				13,995	6.61
Nippon Ishin no Kai				11,772	5.56
Japanese Communist Party	Setsuko Suzuki	19,516	9.36	9,738	4.60
Reiwa Shinsengumi				7,102	3.36
Conservative Party of Japan				5,396	2.55
Tax Cuts Japan and Yukoku Alliance				2,795	1.32
Social Democratic Party				2,065	0.98
Total		208,494	100.00	211,574	100.00
Invalid/blank votes					
Voter turnout			56.89		
Registered voters		377,866		377,866	
LDP hold					

Shizuoka 2nd district
Party	Candidate	Constituency		Proportional	
Party	Candidate	Votes	%	Votes	%
Liberal Democratic Party	Tatsunori Ibayashi	152,012	71.06	86,168	39.58
Centrist Reform Alliance	Takeyuki Suzuki	61,915	28.94	36,866	16.94
Democratic Party For the People				30,614	14.06
Sanseito				15,269	7.01
Team Mirai				13,982	6.42
Nippon Ishin no Kai				10,480	4.81
Reiwa Shinsengumi				7,576	3.48
Japanese Communist Party				6,995	3.21
Conservative Party of Japan				5,034	2.31
Tax Cuts Japan and Yukoku Alliance				2,744	1.26
Social Democratic Party				1,961	0.90
Total		213,927	100.00	217,689	100.00
Invalid/blank votes					
Voter turnout			60.40		
Registered voters		367,097		367,097	
LDP hold					

Shizuoka 3rd district
Party	Candidate	Constituency		Proportional	
Party	Candidate	Votes	%	Votes	%
Liberal Democratic Party	Yuzo Yamamoto	117,738	51.75	88,140	38.66
Centrist Reform Alliance	Nobuhiro Koyama	76,509	33.63	37,729	16.55
Democratic Party For the People				36,997	16.23
Sanseito	Tatsuya Nakahashi	25,070	11.02	17,578	7.71
Team Mirai				13,243	5.81
Nippon Ishin no Kai				9,752	4.28
Japanese Communist Party	Mayumi Takemura	8,196	3.60	7,454	3.27
Reiwa Shinsengumi				7,357	3.23
Conservative Party of Japan				4,956	2.17
Tax Cuts Japan and Yukoku Alliance				2,807	1.23
Social Democratic Party				1,950	0.86
Total		227,513	100.00	227,963	100.00
Invalid/blank votes					
Voter turnout			62.99		
Registered voters		367,015		367,015	
LDP gain from CRA					

Shizuoka 4th district
Party	Candidate	Constituency		Proportional	
Party	Candidate	Votes	%	Votes	%
Liberal Democratic Party	Yoichi Fukazawa	87,880	51.75	66,515	38.56
Democratic Party For the People	Ken Tanaka	61,791	36.39	29,462	17.08
Centrist Reform Alliance				26,901	15.59
Sanseito	Akihiro Takada	11,655	6.86	12,262	7.11
Team Mirai				10,505	6.09
Nippon Ishin no Kai				7,341	4.26
Reiwa Shinsengumi	Satoru Suzuki	8,494	5.00	6,649	3.85
Japanese Communist Party				5,403	3.13
Conservative Party of Japan				3,834	2.22
Tax Cuts Japan and Yukoku Alliance				2,113	1.22
Social Democratic Party				1,519	0.88
Total		169,820	100.00	172,504	100.00
Invalid/blank votes					
Voter turnout			56.97		
Registered voters		307,456		307,456	
LDP gain from DPFP					

Shizuoka 5th district
Party	Candidate	Constituency		Proportional	
Party	Candidate	Votes	%	Votes	%
Liberal Democratic Party	Goshi Hosono	168,511	74.80	91,798	39.76
Centrist Reform Alliance	Masayoshi Nakamura	43,417	19.27	38,413	16.64
Democratic Party For the People				30,950	13.41
Sanseito				16,741	7.25
Team Mirai				16,089	6.97
Nippon Ishin no Kai				11,231	4.86
Reiwa Shinsengumi				7,524	3.26
Japanese Communist Party	Kazumi Shimoyama	13,367	5.93	7,166	3.10
Conservative Party of Japan				5,854	2.54
Tax Cuts Japan and Yukoku Alliance				2,901	1.26
Social Democratic Party				2,216	0.96
Total		225,295	100.00	230,883	100.00
Invalid/blank votes					
Voter turnout			54.09		
Registered voters		433,148		433,148	
LDP hold					

Shizuoka 6th district
Party	Candidate	Constituency		Proportional	
Party	Candidate	Votes	%	Votes	%
Liberal Democratic Party	Takaaki Katsumata	125,829	54.58	93,204	40.38
Centrist Reform Alliance	Shu Watanabe	84,726	36.75	48,825	21.15
Democratic Party For the People				24,589	10.65
Sanseito	Masunori Kurumado	19,972	8.66	15,705	6.80
Team Mirai				13,967	6.05
Nippon Ishin no Kai				9,167	3.97
Reiwa Shinsengumi				7,497	3.25
Japanese Communist Party				7,211	3.12
Conservative Party of Japan				5,327	2.31
Tax Cuts Japan and Yukoku Alliance				3,045	1.32
Social Democratic Party				2,293	0.99
Total		230,527	100.00	230,830	100.00
Invalid/blank votes					
Voter turnout			56.37		
Registered voters		415,778		415,778	
LDP gain from CRA					

Shizuoka 7th district
Party	Candidate	Constituency		Proportional	
Party	Candidate	Votes	%	Votes	%
Liberal Democratic Party	Minoru Kiuchi	129,336	67.66	77,186	39.89
Democratic Party For the People	Fukuko Kitanoya	45,489	23.80	31,352	16.20
Centrist Reform Alliance				27,431	14.18
Sanseito	Sayaka Hakamata	16,319	8.54	15,383	7.95
Team Mirai				11,945	6.17
Nippon Ishin no Kai				9,212	4.76
Reiwa Shinsengumi				6,553	3.39
Japanese Communist Party				6,068	3.14
Conservative Party of Japan				4,235	2.19
Tax Cuts Japan and Yukoku Alliance				2,428	1.25
Social Democratic Party				1,710	0.88
Total		191,144	100.00	193,503	100.00
Invalid/blank votes					
Voter turnout			63.65		
Registered voters		308,869		308,869	
LDP hold					

Shizuoka 8th district
Party	Candidate	Constituency		Proportional	
Party	Candidate	Votes	%	Votes	%
Liberal Democratic Party	Daisuke Inaba	114,256	49.97	86,516	37.75
Centrist Reform Alliance	Kentaro Genma	82,357	36.02	39,249	17.13
Democratic Party For the People				31,201	13.62
Sanseito	Ayano Kanda	23,397	10.23	18,218	7.95
Team Mirai				16,379	7.15
Nippon Ishin no Kai				11,475	5.01
Japanese Communist Party	Yuya Murata	8,617	3.77	7,876	3.44
Reiwa Shinsengumi				7,461	3.26
Conservative Party of Japan				5,754	2.51
Tax Cuts Japan and Yukoku Alliance				3,076	1.34
Social Democratic Party				1,956	0.85
Total		228,627	100.00	229,161	100.00
Invalid/blank votes					
Voter turnout			61.53		
Registered voters		376,852		376,852	
LDP gain from CRA					

=== Aichi Prefecture ===
Aichi Prefecture
Party	Constituency			Proportional	
Party	Votes	%	Seats	Votes	%
Liberal Democratic Party	1,584,873	45.29	12	1,271,377	35.96
Centrist Reform Alliance	762,630	21.79	0	577,412	16.33
Democratic Party For the People	445,757	12.74	3	430,231	12.17
Team Mirai				262,779	7.43
Sanseito	194,717	5.56	0	261,046	7.38
Nippon Ishin no Kai	127,051	3.63	0	222,807	6.30
Tax Cuts Japan and Yukoku Alliance	236,102	6.75	1	155,047	4.39
Japanese Communist Party	88,699	2.53	0	128,068	3.62
Reiwa Shinsengumi	9,835	0.28	0	103,329	2.92
Conservative Party of Japan	32,396	0.93	0	91,116	2.58
Social Democratic Party	10,996	0.31	0	32,128	0.91
Independents	6,487	0.19	0		
Total	3,499,543	100.00	16	3,535,340	100.00
Invalid/blank votes					
Voter turnout					
Registered voters					

Aichi 1st district
Party	Candidate	Constituency		Proportional	
Party	Candidate	Votes	%	Votes	%
Tax Cuts Japan and Yukoku Alliance	Takashi Kawamura	94,339	42.53	20,713	9.29
Liberal Democratic Party	Hiromichi Kumada	72,144	32.53	76,378	34.25
Centrist Reform Alliance	Tsunehiko Yoshida	40,038	18.05	32,914	14.76
Democratic Party For the People				23,323	10.46
Team Mirai				19,403	8.70
Sanseito	Akane Konda	15,283	6.89	15,160	6.80
Nippon Ishin no Kai				12,171	5.46
Japanese Communist Party				9,006	4.04
Conservative Party of Japan				6,421	2.88
Reiwa Shinsengumi				5,591	2.51
Social Democratic Party				1,921	0.86
Total		221,804	100.00	223,001	100.00
Invalid/blank votes					
Voter turnout			54.50		
Registered voters		413,156		413,156	
Genyu hold					

Aichi 2nd district
Party	Candidate	Constituency		Proportional	
Party	Candidate	Votes	%	Votes	%
Democratic Party For the People	Motohisa Furukawa	110,540	49.11	36,040	15.70
Liberal Democratic Party	Tsuji Hideki	74,845	33.25	76,173	33.19
Centrist Reform Alliance				31,437	13.70
Team Mirai				21,285	9.28
Sanseito				14,083	6.14
Tax Cuts Japan and Yukoku Alliance	Tadashi Umemura	24,158	10.73	13,772	6.00
Nippon Ishin no Kai				12,708	5.54
Japanese Communist Party	Kentaro Sakai	15,550	6.91	10,149	4.42
Conservative Party of Japan				5,987	2.61
Reiwa Shinsengumi				5,690	2.48
Social Democratic Party				2,163	0.94
Total		225,093	100.00	229,487	100.00
Invalid/blank votes					
Voter turnout			57.21		
Registered voters		404,338		404,338	
DPFP hold					

Aichi 3rd district
Party	Candidate	Constituency		Proportional	
Party	Candidate	Votes	%	Votes	%
Liberal Democratic Party	Yoshihiko Mizuno	98,388	40.82	78,677	32.38
Centrist Reform Alliance	Shoichi Kondo	70,464	29.24	41,652	17.14
Democratic Party For the People				26,262	10.81
Team Mirai				21,839	8.99
Tax Cuts Japan and Yukoku Alliance	Masaki Hiraiwa	37,335	15.49	17,084	7.03
Nippon Ishin no Kai	Masakazu Minagawa	23,561	9.78	15,985	6.58
Sanseito				15,592	6.42
Japanese Communist Party	Tamio Shibata	11,262	4.67	11,361	4.68
Conservative Party of Japan				6,368	2.62
Reiwa Shinsengumi				5,986	2.46
Social Democratic Party				2,207	0.91
Total		241,010	100.00	243,013	100.00
Invalid/blank votes					
Voter turnout			58.65		
Registered voters		417,852		417,852	
LDP gain from CRA					

Aichi 4th district
Party	Candidate	Constituency		Proportional	
Party	Candidate	Votes	%	Votes	%
Liberal Democratic Party	Shozo Kudo	79,204	41.69	62,262	32.60
Centrist Reform Alliance	Yoshio Maki	50,572	26.62	35,631	18.65
Democratic Party For the People				18,361	9.61
Team Mirai				14,903	7.80
Sanseito	Kana Uozomi	17,699	9.32	13,114	6.87
Tax Cuts Japan and Yukoku Alliance	Yasuhiro Shimura	17,400	9.16	12,778	6.69
Nippon Ishin no Kai	Chiyo Nakata	14,831	7.81	11,932	6.25
Japanese Communist Party	Yusuke Takahashi	10,286	5.41	9,921	5.19
Conservative Party of Japan				5,381	2.82
Reiwa Shinsengumi				4,910	2.57
Social Democratic Party				1,823	0.95
Total		189,992	100.00	191,016	100.00
Invalid/blank votes					
Voter turnout			52.81		
Registered voters		365,094		365,094	
LDP gain from CRA					

Aichi 5th district
Party	Candidate	Constituency		Proportional	
Party	Candidate	Votes	%	Votes	%
Liberal Democratic Party	Yasuhiro Okamoto	73,643	41.68	58,799	33.02
Centrist Reform Alliance	Atsushi Nishikawa	44,288	25.07	32,650	18.34
Democratic Party For the People				18,142	10.19
Team Mirai				13,503	7.58
Tax Cuts Japan and Yukoku Alliance	Katsuyoshi Tanaka	25,815	14.61	12,706	7.14
Sanseito	Aira Watanabe	18,970	10.74	13,461	7.56
Nippon Ishin no Kai				10,564	5.93
Japanese Communist Party	Hiroyuki Egami	7,487	4.24	6,964	3.91
Independent	Kenji Kanda	6,487	3.67		
Conservative Party of Japan				4,940	2.77
Reiwa Shinsengumi				4,843	2.72
Social Democratic Party				1,498	0.84
Total		176,690	100.00	178,070	100.00
Invalid/blank votes					
Voter turnout			51.57		
Registered voters		348,674		348,674	
LDP gain from CRA					

Aichi 6th district
Party	Candidate	Constituency		Proportional	
Party	Candidate	Votes	%	Votes	%
Liberal Democratic Party	Hideki Niwa	109,044	54.06	71,166	34.96
Centrist Reform Alliance	Nobue Kunizaki	39,828	19.75	35,000	17.19
Democratic Party For the People				22,285	10.95
Sanseito	Mai Kasuga	28,651	14.20	16,722	8.21
Team Mirai				15,275	7.50
Nippon Ishin no Kai				12,488	6.13
Japanese Communist Party				8,339	4.10
Tax Cuts Japan and Yukoku Alliance	Ben Hashimoto	13,179	6.53	8,308	4.08
Reiwa Shinsengumi				5,723	2.81
Conservative Party of Japan				4,916	2.41
Social Democratic Party	Masato Onishi	10,996	5.45	3,358	1.65
Total		201,698	100.00	203,580	100.00
Invalid/blank votes					
Voter turnout			58.31		
Registered voters		352,828		352,828	
LDP hold					

Aichi 7th district
Party	Candidate	Constituency		Proportional	
Party	Candidate	Votes	%	Votes	%
Democratic Party For the People	Saria Hino	108,322	49.77	36,974	16.61
Liberal Democratic Party	Junji Suzuki	94,971	43.63	79,670	35.79
Centrist Reform Alliance				29,359	13.19
Team Mirai				18,561	8.34
Sanseito				15,240	6.85
Nippon Ishin no Kai				13,639	6.13
Japanese Communist Party	Koichi Suzuki	14,370	6.60	8,281	3.72
Tax Cuts Japan and Yukoku Alliance				7,201	3.23
Reiwa Shinsengumi				6,149	2.76
Conservative Party of Japan				5,457	2.45
Social Democratic Party				2,101	0.94
Total		217,663	100.00	222,632	100.00
Invalid/blank votes					
Voter turnout			63.57		
Registered voters		353,882		353,882	
DPFP hold					

Aichi 8th district
Party	Candidate	Constituency		Proportional	
Party	Candidate	Votes	%	Votes	%
Liberal Democratic Party	Tadahiko Ito	131,050	52.84	93,300	37.20
Centrist Reform Alliance	Yutaka Banno	84,571	34.10	45,100	17.98
Democratic Party For the People				27,576	10.99
Sanseito				18,294	7.29
Team Mirai				17,098	6.82
Nippon Ishin no Kai				14,808	5.90
Japanese Communist Party				8,315	3.32
Reiwa Shinsengumi				8,164	3.25
Conservative Party of Japan	Kenichi Nakagawa	32,396	13.06	8,096	3.23
Tax Cuts Japan and Yukoku Alliance				7,705	3.07
Social Democratic Party				2,372	0.95
Total		248,017	100.00	250,828	100.00
Invalid/blank votes					
Voter turnout			59.18		
Registered voters		429,573		429,573	
LDP gain from CRA					

Aichi 9th district
Party	Candidate	Constituency		Proportional	
Party	Candidate	Votes	%	Votes	%
Liberal Democratic Party	Yasumasa Nagasaka	93,351	45.11	76,480	36.80
Centrist Reform Alliance	Mitsunori Okamoto	58,084	28.07	39,079	18.80
Democratic Party For the People				19,983	9.62
Nippon Ishin no Kai	Nana Uragami	24,489	11.83	15,697	7.55
Sanseito	Taichi Kato	22,098	10.68	15,887	7.64
Team Mirai				13,438	6.47
Japanese Communist Party	Keiko Ito	8,930	4.32	7,828	3.77
Tax Cuts Japan and Yukoku Alliance				6,895	3.32
Reiwa Shinsengumi				5,763	2.77
Conservative Party of Japan				5,062	2.44
Social Democratic Party				1,716	0.83
Total		206,952	100.00	207,828	100.00
Invalid/blank votes					
Voter turnout			56.11		
Registered voters		374,810		374,810	
LDP gain from CRA					

Aichi 10th district
Party	Candidate	Constituency		Proportional	
Party	Candidate	Votes	%	Votes	%
Liberal Democratic Party	Shinji Wakayama	80,646	42.10	67,481	35.05
Centrist Reform Alliance	Norimasa Fujiwara	43,496	22.71	33,302	17.30
Nippon Ishin no Kai	Kazumi Sugimoto	28,434	14.85	18,391	9.55
Democratic Party For the People	Ryohei Mishima	21,072	11.00	20,306	10.55
Sanseito	Ryohei Yamauchi	17,891	9.34	14,475	7.52
Team Mirai				14,388	7.47
Japanese Communist Party				6,337	3.29
Tax Cuts Japan and Yukoku Alliance				6,051	3.14
Reiwa Shinsengumi				5,413	2.81
Conservative Party of Japan				4,808	2.50
Social Democratic Party				1,562	0.81
Total		191,539	100.00	192,514	100.00
Invalid/blank votes					
Voter turnout			55.77		
Registered voters		348,845		348,845	
LDP gain from CRA					

Aichi 11th district
Party	Candidate	Constituency		Proportional	
Party	Candidate	Votes	%	Votes	%
Democratic Party For the People	Midori Tanno	145,739	59.69	48,156	19.28
Liberal Democratic Party	Tadamori Fujisawa	98,411	40.31	97,211	38.91
Centrist Reform Alliance				31,322	12.54
Sanseito				17,154	6.87
Team Mirai				15,968	6.39
Nippon Ishin no Kai				12,761	5.11
Reiwa Shinsengumi				7,857	3.14
Tax Cuts Japan and Yukoku Alliance				6,348	2.54
Japanese Communist Party				5,628	2.25
Conservative Party of Japan				5,357	2.14
Social Democratic Party				2,065	0.83
Total		244,150	100.00	249,827	100.00
Invalid/blank votes					
Voter turnout			66.57		
Registered voters		381,041		381,041	
DPFP hold					

Aichi 12th district
Party	Candidate	Constituency		Proportional	
Party	Candidate	Votes	%	Votes	%
Liberal Democratic Party	Shuhei Aoyama	128,453	47.01	109,204	39.84
Centrist Reform Alliance	Kazuhiko Shigetoku	107,130	39.20	46,997	17.15
Democratic Party For the People				29,531	10.77
Sanseito	Hiroto Nakagawa	37,684	13.79	23,791	8.68
Team Mirai				17,941	6.55
Nippon Ishin no Kai				14,777	5.39
Reiwa Shinsengumi				8,614	3.14
Tax Cuts Japan and Yukoku Alliance				7,289	2.66
Japanese Communist Party				7,203	2.63
Conservative Party of Japan				6,519	2.38
Social Democratic Party				2,220	0.81
Total		273,267	100.00	274,086	100.00
Invalid/blank votes					
Voter turnout			63.17		
Registered voters		440,188		440,188	
LDP gain from CRA					

Aichi 13th district
Party	Candidate	Constituency		Proportional	
Party	Candidate	Votes	%	Votes	%
Liberal Democratic Party	Taku Ishii	151,944	58.61	101,223	38.35
Centrist Reform Alliance	Kensuke Onishi	94,399	36.41	40,646	15.40
Democratic Party For the People				34,004	12.88
Sanseito				20,251	7.67
Team Mirai				19,607	7.43
Nippon Ishin no Kai				15,817	5.99
Reiwa Shinsengumi				8,485	3.21
Japanese Communist Party	Kiyohiro Ushita	12,910	4.98	7,969	3.02
Tax Cuts Japan and Yukoku Alliance				7,027	2.66
Conservative Party of Japan				6,833	2.59
Social Democratic Party				2,082	0.79
Total		259,253	100.00	263,944	100.00
Invalid/blank votes					
Voter turnout			63.44		
Registered voters		421,495		421,495	
LDP gain from CRA					

Aichi 14th district
Party	Candidate	Constituency		Proportional	
Party	Candidate	Votes	%	Votes	%
Liberal Democratic Party	Soichiro Imaeda	119,376	67.43	70,049	39.31
Centrist Reform Alliance	Rie Otake	49,753	28.10	32,872	18.45
Democratic Party For the People				17,915	10.05
Sanseito				14,134	7.93
Team Mirai				10,868	6.10
Nippon Ishin no Kai				9,759	5.48
Japanese Communist Party	Daisuke Asao	7,904	4.46	5,890	3.31
Reiwa Shinsengumi				5,815	3.26
Tax Cuts Japan and Yukoku Alliance				4,951	2.78
Conservative Party of Japan				4,510	2.53
Social Democratic Party				1,436	0.81
Total		177,033	100.00	178,199	100.00
Invalid/blank votes					
Voter turnout			63.01		
Registered voters		287,106		287,106	
LDP hold					

Aichi 15th district
Party	Candidate	Constituency		Proportional	
Party	Candidate	Votes	%	Votes	%
Liberal Democratic Party	Yukinori Nemoto	88,028	43.55	72,681	35.85
Centrist Reform Alliance	Chiho Koyama	36,614	18.11	30,460	15.02
Democratic Party For the People				20,180	9.95
Nippon Ishin no Kai	Kenichiro Seki	35,736	17.68	19,145	9.44
Sanseito	Katsuhiro Suzuki	19,022	9.41	16,788	8.28
Team Mirai				13,363	6.59
Tax Cuts Japan and Yukoku Alliance	Yuko Takegami	12,892	6.38	8,152	4.02
Reiwa Shinsengumi	Megumu Tsuji	9,835	4.87	8,254	4.07
Japanese Communist Party				6,718	3.31
Conservative Party of Japan				5,285	2.61
Social Democratic Party				1,725	0.85
Total		202,127	100.00	202,751	100.00
Invalid/blank votes					
Voter turnout			60.63		
Registered voters		338,422		338,422	
LDP hold					

Aichi 16th district
Party	Candidate	Constituency		Proportional	
Party	Candidate	Votes	%	Votes	%
Liberal Democratic Party	Shizuo Yamashita	91,375	40.93	80,623	35.90
Democratic Party For the People	Toru Fukuta	60,084	26.91	31,193	13.89
Centrist Reform Alliance	Isao Matsuda	43,393	19.44	38,991	17.36
Sanseito	Nobue Watanabe	17,419	7.80	16,900	7.53
Team Mirai				15,339	6.83
Nippon Ishin no Kai				12,165	5.42
Japanese Communist Party				8,159	3.63
Tax Cuts Japan and Yukoku Alliance	Yukichi Maeda	10,984	4.92	8,067	3.59
Reiwa Shinsengumi				6,072	2.70
Conservative Party of Japan				5,176	2.30
Social Democratic Party				1,879	0.84
Total		223,255	100.00	224,564	100.00
Invalid/blank votes					
Voter turnout			58.55		
Registered voters		387,420		387,420	
LDP gain from DPFP					

=== Mie Prefecture ===
Mie Prefecture
Party	Constituency			Proportional	
Party	Votes	%	Seats	Votes	%
Liberal Democratic Party	448,367	55.44	4	315,793	38.82
Centrist Reform Alliance	221,839	27.43	0	175,289	21.55
Democratic Party For the People	43,016	5.32	0	66,840	8.22
Sanseito	50,969	6.30	0	65,816	8.09
Nippon Ishin no Kai				48,082	5.91
Team Mirai				46,231	5.68
Japanese Communist Party	27,656	3.42	0	25,719	3.16
Reiwa Shinsengumi				24,820	3.05
Conservative Party of Japan	16,907	2.09	0	23,839	2.93
Tax Cuts Japan and Yukoku Alliance				12,940	1.59
Social Democratic Party				8,209	1.01
Total	808,754	100.00	4	813,578	100.00
Invalid/blank votes					
Voter turnout					
Registered voters					

Mie 1st district
Party	Candidate	Constituency		Proportional	
Party	Candidate	Votes	%	Votes	%
Liberal Democratic Party	Norihisa Tamura	124,762	66.28	73,986	38.92
Centrist Reform Alliance	Wakako Fukumori	53,020	28.17	41,828	22.00
Democratic Party For the People				14,389	7.57
Sanseito				13,946	7.34
Nippon Ishin no Kai				11,531	6.07
Team Mirai				11,133	5.86
Japanese Communist Party	Yosuke Deguchi	10,465	5.56	7,140	3.76
Reiwa Shinsengumi				5,995	3.15
Conservative Party of Japan				5,216	2.74
Tax Cuts Japan and Yukoku Alliance				2,996	1.58
Social Democratic Party				1,959	1.03
Total		188,247	100.00	190,119	100.00
Invalid/blank votes					
Voter turnout			55.55		
Registered voters		346,871		346,871	
LDP hold					

Mie 2nd district
Party	Candidate	Constituency		Proportional	
Party	Candidate	Votes	%	Votes	%
Liberal Democratic Party	Hideto Kawasaki	117,495	52.48	87,715	38.98
Centrist Reform Alliance	Kosuke Shimono	78,118	34.89	48,831	21.70
Sanseito	Yukiyasu Mizutani	28,267	12.63	19,405	8.62
Democratic Party For the People				17,145	7.62
Nippon Ishin no Kai				15,144	6.73
Team Mirai				11,735	5.22
Reiwa Shinsengumi				6,801	3.02
Japanese Communist Party				6,535	2.90
Conservative Party of Japan				6,181	2.75
Tax Cuts Japan and Yukoku Alliance				3,251	1.44
Social Democratic Party				2,279	1.01
Total		223,880	100.00	225,022	100.00
Invalid/blank votes					
Voter turnout			57.72		
Registered voters		394,575		394,575	
LDP gain from CRA					

Mie 3rd district
Party	Candidate	Constituency		Proportional	
Party	Candidate	Votes	%	Votes	%
Liberal Democratic Party	Masataka Ishihara	99,392	42.11	86,833	36.71
Centrist Reform Alliance	Katsuya Okada	90,701	38.42	52,663	22.26
Sanseito	Megumi Shintani	22,702	9.62	20,640	8.73
Democratic Party For the People				20,195	8.54
Team Mirai				15,347	6.49
Nippon Ishin no Kai				12,229	5.17
Conservative Party of Japan	Masashi Ito	16,907	7.16	8,674	3.67
Reiwa Shinsengumi				6,932	2.93
Japanese Communist Party	Tamiko Kinugasa	6,345	2.69	6,751	2.85
Tax Cuts Japan and Yukoku Alliance				4,114	1.74
Social Democratic Party				2,180	0.92
Total		236,047	100.00	236,558	100.00
Invalid/blank votes					
Voter turnout			58.80		
Registered voters		406,846		406,846	
LDP gain from CRA					

Mie 4th district
Party	Candidate	Constituency		Proportional	
Party	Candidate	Votes	%	Votes	%
Liberal Democratic Party	Eikei Suzuki	106,718	66.46	67,259	41.55
Centrist Reform Alliance				31,967	19.75
Democratic Party For the People	Daisuke Fujita	43,016	26.79	15,111	9.33
Sanseito				11,825	7.30
Nippon Ishin no Kai				9,178	5.67
Team Mirai				8,016	4.95
Japanese Communist Party	Tamihide Nakagawa	10,846	6.75	5,293	3.27
Reiwa Shinsengumi				5,092	3.15
Conservative Party of Japan				3,768	2.33
Tax Cuts Japan and Yukoku Alliance				2,579	1.59
Social Democratic Party				1,791	1.11
Total		160,580	100.00	161,879	100.00
Invalid/blank votes					
Voter turnout			59.38		
Registered voters		277,284		277,284	
LDP hold					

== Proportional representation ==
Proportional representation results
Party	Votes	Seats	Rank	Elected member	Constituency	Ratio
LDP	2,628,008 (37.7%)	10	1	Sakon Yamamoto		
LDP	2,628,008 (37.7%)	10	2	Junji Suzuki	Aichi 7th	87.6%
LDP	2,628,008 (37.7%)	10	2	Hiromichi Kumada	Aichi 1st	76.4%
LDP	2,628,008 (37.7%)	10	2	Tsuji Hideki	Aichi 2nd	67.7%
LDP	2,628,008 (37.7%)	10	2	Tadamori Fujisawa	Aichi 11th	67.5%
LDP	2,628,008 (37.7%)	10	34	Kenichi Hosoda		
LDP	2,628,008 (37.7%)	10	35	Nakagawa Takamoto		
LDP	2,628,008 (37.7%)	10	36	Rie Saito		
LDP	2,628,008 (37.7%)	10	37	Koichiro Osada		
LDP	2,628,008 (37.7%)	10	38	Seko Mamiko		
CRA	1,199,580 (17.2%)	4	1	Yasuhiro Nakagawa		
CRA	1,199,580 (17.2%)	4	2	Katsuhide Nishizono		
CRA	1,199,580 (17.2%)	4	3	Kiyoshi Inukai		
CRA	1,199,580 (17.2%)	4	4	Kazuhiko Shigetoku	Aichi 12th	83.4%
DPFP	836,102 (12.0%)	3	1	Ken Tanaka	Shizuoka 4th	70.3%
DPFP	836,102 (12.0%)	3	1	Toru Fukuta	Aichi 16th	65.7%
DPFP	836,102 (12.0%)	3	1	Miho Nomura	Gifu 2nd	50.8%
Sansei	527,291 (7.6%)	2	1	Airi Watanabe	Aichi 5th	25.7%
Sansei	527,291 (7.6%)	2	1	Ito Keisuke	Gifu 3rd	19.6%
Mirai	478,316 (6.9%)	1	1	Suda Eitaro		
Ishin	400,964 (5.7%)	1	1	Kenichiro Seki	Aichi 15th	40.5%

Liberal Democratic Party 2,628,018 (37.65%) 10 seats
Rank	Candidate	Constituency	Ratio
1	Sakon Yamamoto		
2	Seiko Noda	Gifu 1st	Won
2	Yasufumi Tanahashi	Gifu 2nd	Won
2	Yoji Muto	Gifu 3rd	Won
2	Tomohiro Kato	Gifu 4th	Won
2	Yōko Kamikawa	Shizuoka 1st	Won
2	Tatsunori Ibayashi	Shizuoka 2nd	Won
2	Yuzo Yamamoto	Shizuoka 3rd	Won
2	Yoichi Fukazawa	Shizuoka 4th	Won
2	Goshi Hosono	Shizuoka 5th	Won
2	Takaaki Katsumata	Shizuoka 6th	Won
2	Minoru Kiuchi	Shizuoka 7th	Won
2	Daisuke Inaba	Shizuoka 8th	Won
2	Yoshihiko Mizuno	Aichi 3rd	Won
2	Shozo Kudo	Aichi 4th	Won
2	Yasuhiro Okamoto	Aichi 5th	Won
2	Hideki Niwa	Aichi 6th	Won
2	Tadahiko Ito	Aichi 8th	Won
2	Yasumasa Nagasaka	Aichi 9th	Won
2	Shinji Wakayama	Aichi 10th	Won
2	Shuhei Aoyama	Aichi 12th	Won
2	Taku Ishii	Aichi 13th	Won
2	Soichiro Imaeda	Aichi 14th	Won
2	Yukinori Nemoto	Aichi 15th	Won
2	Shizuo Yamashita	Aichi 16th	Won
2	Norihisa Tamura	Mie 1st	Won
2	Hideto Kawasaki	Mie 2nd	Won
2	Masataka Ishihara	Mie 3rd	Won
2	Eikei Suzuki	Mie 4th	Won
2	Junji Suzuki	Aichi 7th	87.6
2	Hiromichi Kumada	Aichi 1st	76.4
2	Tsuji Hideki	Aichi 2nd	67.7
2	Tadamori Fujisawa	Aichi 11th	76.5
34	Kenichi Hosoda		
35	Nakagawa Takamoto		
36	Rie Saito		
37	Koichiro Osada		
38	Seko Mamiko		
39	Tadamasa Matsumoto		

Centrist Reform Alliance 1,199,580 (17.19%) 4 seats
Rank	Candidate	Constituency	Ratio
1	Yasuhiro Nakagawa		
2	Katsuhide Nishizono		
3	Kiyoshi Inukai		
4	Kazuhiko Shigetoku	Aichi 12th	83.4
4	Masato Imai	Gifu 4th	77.1
4	Kentaro Genma	Shizuoka 8th	72.0
4	Shoichi Kondo	Aichi 3rd	71.6
4	Shu Watanabe	Shizuoka 6th	67.3
4	Kosuke Shimono	Mie 2nd	66.4
4	Nobuhiro Koyama	Shizuoka 3rd	64.9
4	Yutaka Banno	Aichi 8th	64.5
4	Yoshio Maki	Aichi 4th	63.8
4	Mitsunori Okamoto	Aichi 9th	62.2
4	Kensuke Onishi	Aichi 13th	62.1
4	Atsushi Nishikawa	Aichi 5th	60.1
4	Norimasa Fujiwara	Aichi 10th	53.9
4	Isao Matsuda	Aichi 16th	47.4
4	Satoshi Mano	Gifu 5th	45.2
4	Wakako Fukumori	Mie 1st	42.4
4	Tsunehiko Yoshida	Aichi 1st	42.4
4	Rie Otake	Aichi 14th	41.6
4	Chiho Koyama	Aichi 15th	41.5
4	Takeyuki Suzuki	Shizuoka 2nd	40.7
4	Manabu Hattori	Gifu 1st	40.6
4	Nobue Kunizaki	Aichi 6th	36.5
4	Masayoshi Nakamura	Shizuoka 5th	25.7

Democratic Party For the People 836,102 (11.98%) 3 seats
Rank	Candidate	Constituency	Ratio
1	Motohisa Furukawa	Aichi 2nd	Won
1	Saria Hino	Aichi 7th	Won
1	Midori Tanno	Aichi 11th	Won
1	Ken Tanaka	Shizuoka 4th	70.3
1	Toru Fukuta	Aichi 16th	65.7
1	Miho Nomura	Gifu 2nd	50.8
1	Shohei Shibata	Shizuoka 1st	48.2
1	Akihiro Senda	Gifu 3rd	43.1
1	Daisuke Fujita	Mie 4th	40.3
1	Fukuko Kitanoya	Shizuoka 7th	35.1
1	Mototaka Yoshida	Gifu 5th	33.1
1	Ryohei Mishima	Aichi 10th	26.1

Sanseito 527,293 (7.56%) 2 seats
Rank	Candidate	Constituency	Ratio
1	Airi Watanabe	Aichi 5th	25.7
1	~~Megumi Shintani~~ (Note: Ineligible for election - failed to surpass the required 10% of votes in their single-member constituency race.)	Mie 3rd	22.8
1	Ito Keisuke	Gifu 3rd	19.6
1	~~Akihiro Takada~~	Shizuoka 4th	13.3
5	Hiroto Nakagawa	Aichi 12th	29.3
5	Yukiyasu Mizutani	Mie 2nd	24.0
5	~~Ryohei Yamauchi~~	Aichi 10th	22.2

Team Mirai 478,316 (6.85%) 1 seat
Rank	Candidate	Constituency	Ratio
1	Suda Eitaro		

Nippon Ishin no Kai 400,964 (5.74%) 1 seat
Rank	Candidate	Constituency	Ratio
1	Kenichiro Seki	Aichi 15th	40.5
1	Kazumi Sugimoto	Aichi 10th	35.2
1	Nana Uragami	Aichi 9th	26.2
1	~~Masakazu Minagawa~~	Aichi 3rd	23.9
1	~~Chiyo Nakata~~	Aichi 4th	18.7
1	~~Ryoji Yamada~~	Gifu 5th	13.5

Japanese Communist Party 241,848 (3.47%) 0 seats
Rank	Candidate	Constituency	Ratio
1	Nobuko Motomura		
2	Hatsumi Suyama		

Reiwa Shinsengumi 218,838 (3.14%) 0 seats
Rank	Candidate	Constituency	Ratio
1	Naoto Sakaguchi	Gifu 3rd	24.3
1	~~Megumu Tsuji~~	Aichi 15th	11.2
1	~~Satoru Suzuki~~	Shizuoka 4th	9.7
4	Hideaki Uemura		

Tax Cuts Japan and Yukoku Alliance 209,174 (3.00%) 0 seats
Rank	Candidate	Constituency	Ratio
1	Masaki Hiraiwa	Aichi 3rd	37.9
1	Katsuyoshi Tanaka	Aichi 5th	35.0
1	Tadashi Umemura	Aichi 2nd	21.8
1	~~Yasuhiro Shimura~~	Aichi 4th	22.0
1	~~Yuko Takegami~~	Aichi 15th	14.6
1	~~Ben Hashimoto~~	Aichi 6th	12.1
1	~~Yukichi Maeda~~	Aichi 16th	12.0
8	Takashi Kawamura	Aichi 1st	Won

Conservative Party of Japan 175,506 (2.51%) 0 seats
Rank	Candidate	Constituency	Ratio
1	Kaori Arimoto		
2	Kenichi Nakagawa	Aichi 8th	24.7
3	~~Masashi Ito~~	Mie 3rd	17.0

Social Democratic Party 63,729 (0.91%) 0 seats
Rank	Candidate	Constituency	Ratio
1	~~Masato Onishi~~	Aichi 6th	10.1
