= Shuhei Aoyama (politician) =

Japanese politician

- 青山 周平
- Official portrait, 2026

State Minister of Education, Culture, Sports, Science and Technology
- In office 15 September 2023 – 14 December 2023
- Prime Minister: Fumio Kishida

Parliamentary Vice-Minister of Education, Culture, Sports, Science and Technology
- In office 11 September 2019 – September 2020
- Prime Minister: Shinzo Abe

Member of the House of Representatives
- Incumbent
- Assumed office 10 February 2026
- Preceded by: Kazuhiko Shigetoku
- Constituency: Aichi 12th
- In office 5 February 2019 – 9 October 2024
- Preceded by: Sei Ōmi
- Succeeded by: Multi-member district
- Constituency: Tōkai PR
- In office 18 December 2012 – 28 September 2017
- Preceded by: Yasuhiro Nakane
- Succeeded by: Multi-member district
- Constituency: Aichi 12th (2012–2014); Tōkai PR (2014–2017)

Personal details
- Born: 28 April 1977 (age 49) Okazaki, Aichi, Japan
- Party: Liberal Democratic
- Children: 4
- Education: Hosei University
- Website: aoyama-shuhei.jp

Shuhei Aoyama (青山 周平, Aoyama Shūhei; born 28 April 1977) is a Japanese politician of the Liberal Democratic Party who has served as a member of the House of Representatives for Aichi 12th district since 2026. He previously represented the district from 2012 to 2014 and also served in the House through the Tōkai proportional representation block from 2014 to 2017 and from 2019 to 2024. He has also served as State Minister of Education, Culture, Sports, Science and Technology and as Parliamentary Vice-Minister of Education, Culture, Sports, Science and Technology.

== Early life and education ==
Aoyama was born in Okazaki, Aichi Prefecture, on 28 April 1977, the eldest son of the Aoyama family. According to his official profile, he graduated from Okazaki Municipal Fukuoka Elementary School in 1990, Okazaki Municipal Fukuoka Junior High School in 1993, Aichi Prefectural Okazaki High School in 1996, and the Faculty of Social Sciences of Hosei University in 2000.

In childhood and youth, Aoyama was active in sport. His official profile states that he joined the Okazaki Rugby School when he was in the second year of elementary school, played baseball and long-distance relay running in junior high school, and captained the rugby team at Okazaki High School.

== Political career ==
After graduating from university, Aoyama joined JR Takashimaya in 2000. In 2001 he entered the educational corporation Aoyama Gakuen, where he later served in posts including kindergarten principal and administrative director. He became interested in politics through the political seminar group Poseya organised by former justice minister Masaharu Sugiura, and later studied at the LDP-affiliated Aichi Political Academy.

Following Sugiura's retirement from national politics, Aoyama stood in the Liberal Democratic Party's 2011 open recruitment for the party branch leadership in Aichi 12th district and was appointed branch chief. He was first elected to the House of Representatives at the 2012 general election from Aichi 12th district. He was re-elected in 2014 through the Tōkai proportional representation block, but lost his seat at the 2017 general election despite receiving more than 100,000 votes in the district.

Aoyama returned to the House in February 2019 by proportional replacement after Tadahiko Ōmi automatically lost his seat by standing in the Anjō mayoral election. In September 2019 he was appointed Parliamentary Vice-Minister of Education, Culture, Sports, Science and Technology, concurrently serving as Parliamentary Vice-Minister in the Cabinet Office and for Reconstruction in the fourth Abe cabinet (second reshuffle).

He won a fourth term at the 2021 general election through the Tōkai proportional block, and in September 2023 was appointed State Minister of Education, Culture, Sports, Science and Technology in the second reshuffled Second Kishida Cabinet. He lost his seat at the 2024 general election, but returned to the House at the 2026 general election by winning Aichi 12th district, his fifth overall term.

== Personal life ==
Aoyama married a classmate from his high school days in 2001. His official profile states that he and his wife have four children—three sons and one daughter—and live in an eight-member household.

An interview published by Go2senkyo states that his father is Akio Aoyama, a former Okazaki city councillor and six-term member of the Aichi Prefectural Assembly. Aoyama has also described rugby as central to his outlook, citing the sport's ethic of one for all, all for one as an influence on his politics.
