= Shuhei Aoyama =

Shuhei Aoyama may refer to:

- Shuhei Aoyama (motorcycle racer) (1984–), Japanese Motorcycle Racer
- Shuhei Aoyama (politician) (1977–), Japanese politician
