= Aichi 16th district =

Constituency of Aichi Prefecture, Japan

- Parliamentary constituency for the Japanese House of Representatives
- Numbered map of Aichi Prefecture single-member districts
- Prefecture: Aichi
- Proportional District: Tokai
- Electorate: 391,616

Current constituency
- Created: 2022
- Seats: One
- Party: LDP
- Representative: Shizuo Yamashita

Aichi 16th District (愛知県第16区, Aichi-ken dai-juroku-ku) is an electoral district of the Japanese House of Representatives. It was first created as part of the 2022 reapportionments that added one district to Aichi Prefecture. Tōru Fukuta became the first representative as a result of the 2024 general election.

== Area ==
The district includes the following municipalities.

- Kitanagoya
- Komaki
- Kōnan
- Inuyama
- Toyoyama Town
- Fusō Town
- Ōguchi Town

== Elected representatives ==
Representative	Party	Years served	Notes
Tōru Fukuta	DPP	2024 – 2026	
Shizuo Yamashita	LDP	2026 –	Former Mayor of Komaki City

== Election results ==
2026
Party	Candidate	Votes	%	±%
LDP	Shizuo Yamashita	91,375	40.9	
DPP	Tōru Fukuta (elected in Tōkai PR block)	60,084	26.9	▼5.8
Centrist Reform	Isao Matsuda	43,393	19.4	▼11.2
Sanseitō	Nobue Watanabe	17,419	7.8	
Genzei–Yukoku	Yukichi Maeda	10,984	4.9	
Registered electors		387,420		
Turnout			58.55	▲4.95
LDP gain from DPP				

2024
Party	Candidate	Votes	%	±%
DPP	Tōru Fukuta	65,923	32.7	
Komeito	Akiyoshi Inukai	63,095	31.3	
CDP	Isao Matsuda (elected in PR block)	61,792	30.7	
JCP	Shōzō Matsuzaki	10,634	5.3	
Turnout			53.60	
