= Gifu 4th district =

Legislative district of Japan

Gifu 4th District
- Parliamentary constituency for the Japanese House of Representatives
- Numbered map of Gifu Prefecture single-member districts
- Prefecture: Gifu
- Proportional District: Tōkai
- Electorate: 327,816

Current constituency
- Created: 1994
- Seats: One
- Party: LDP
- Representative: Tomohiro Katō
- Municipalities: Gero, Gujō, Hida, Kani, Minokamo, Takayama, Kamo District, Kani District and Ōno District

Gifu 4th district (岐阜県第4区, Gifu-ken dai-yonku or simply 岐阜4区, Gifu-yonku) is a single-member constituency of the House of Representatives in the national Diet of Japan located in Gifu Prefecture.

== List of representatives ==
Election	Representative	Party	Notes
1996	Takao Fujii	Liberal Democratic	
2000	Kazuyoshi Kaneko	Liberal Democratic	
2003	Takao Fujii	Liberal Democratic	
2005	Kazuyoshi Kaneko	Liberal Democratic	
2009	Kazuyoshi Kaneko	Liberal Democratic	
2012	Kazuyoshi Kaneko	Liberal Democratic	
2014	Kazuyoshi Kaneko	Liberal Democratic	
2017	Shunpei Kaneko	Liberal Democratic	
2021	Shunpei Kaneko	Liberal Democratic	
2024	Masato Imai	Constitutional Democratic	
2026	Tomohiro Katō	Liberal Democratic	

== Election results ==
2026
Party	Candidate	Votes	%	±%
LDP	Tomohiro Katō	103,054	50.7	▲8
Centrist Reform	Masato Imai (incumbent)	79,476	39.1	▼18.2
Sanseitō	Yusuke Soga	20,886	10.3	
Turnout		203,416	65.46	▲1.55
LDP gain from Centrist Reform				

2024
Party	Candidate	Votes	%	±%
CDP	Masato Imai	114,032	57.3	▲15.1
LDP	Shunpei Kaneko	85,129	42.7	▼8.5
Turnout			63.91	▼2.46
CDP gain from LDP				

2021
Party	Candidate	Votes	%	±%
Liberal Democratic	Shunpei Kaneko (Incumbent)	110,844	51.23	
CDP	Masato Imai (Incumbent-Tōkai PR block)	91,354	42.22	New
Innovation	Tetsuya Saeki	14,171	6.55	New
Registered electors		330,497		
Turnout			66.37	▲1.01
LDP hold				

2017
Party	Candidate	Votes	%	±%
Liberal Democratic	Shunpei Kaneko	107,473	49.19	
Kibō no Tō	Masato Imai (Incumbent-Tōkai PR block) (re-elected by Tōkai PR block)	92,370	42.28	New
Communist	Emiko Kagoyama	18,634	8.53	
Registered electors		341,541		
Turnout			65.36	▲4.30
LDP hold				

2014
Party	Candidate	Votes	%	±%
Liberal Democratic	Kazuyoshi Kaneko (Incumbent)	104,139	51.43	
Innovation	Masato Imai (Incumbent-Tōkai PR block) (re-elected by Tōkai PR block)	80,042	39.53	New
Communist	Akihiro Ishima	18,325	9.05	
Registered electors		339,586		
Turnout			61.06	▼7.60
LDP hold				

2012
Party	Candidate	Votes	%	±%
Liberal Democratic	Kazuyoshi Kaneko (Incumbent)	121,761	53.07	
Restoration	Masato Imai (Incumbent-Tōkai PR block) (re-elected by Tōkai PR block)	59,449	25.91	New
Democratic	Yoichi Kumazaki	32,403	14.12	
Communist	Toshio Kusakabe	15,808	6.89	
Registered electors		344,214		
Turnout			68.66	
LDP hold				

2009
Party	Candidate	Votes	%	±%
Liberal Democratic	Kazuyoshi Kaneko (Incumbent)	141,679	52.89	
Democratic	Masato Imai (elected by Tōkai PR block)	120,525	44.99	
Happiness Realization	Takehiro Kawai	5,666	2.12	New
Registered electors		347,362		
Turnout			78.32	
LDP hold				
