= Akihiro Senda =

Japanese politician (born 1982)

- 仙田 晃宏
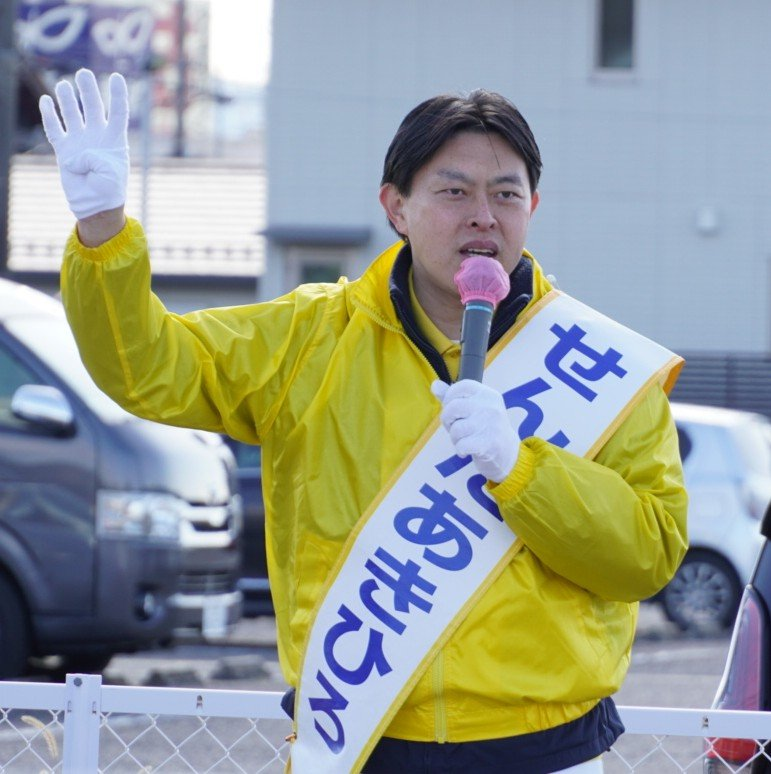
- Senda in 2026

Member of the House of Representatives
- In office 1 November 2024 – 23 January 2026
- Preceded by: Ken Tanaka
- Succeeded by: Multi-member district
- Constituency: Tōkai PR

Personal details
- Born: 11 October 1982 (age 43) Ōguchi, Aichi, Japan
- Party: DPP
- Education: Meiji University

Akihiro Senda (仙田晃宏, Senda Akihiro; born 11 October 1982) is a Japanese politician who served as a member of the House of Representatives from 2024 to 2026. He previously worked at NTT Data and as a legislative assistant.
