= Yoichi Fukazawa =

Japanese politician (born 1976)

- 深澤 陽一
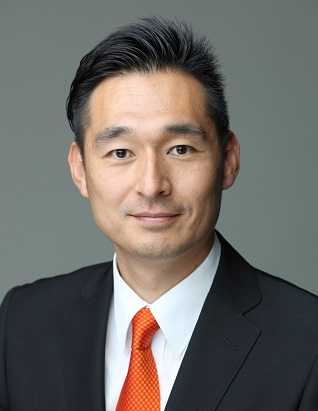
- Official portrait, 2021

Member of the House of Representatives
- Incumbent
- Assumed office 27 April 2020
- Preceded by: Yoshio Mochizuki
- Constituency: Shizuoka 4th (2020–2024); Tōkai PR (2024–2026); Shizuoka 4th (2026–present)

Member of the Shizuoka Prefectural Assembly
- In office April 2011 – 21 February 2020
- Constituency: Shizuoka City Shimizu Ward

Member of the Shizuoka City Council
- In office 2005–2011
- Constituency: Shimizu Ward

Personal details
- Born: 21 June 1976 (age 50) Shimizu, Shizuoka, Japan
- Party: Liberal Democratic
- Education: Shinshu University

Yoichi Fukazawa (深澤陽一, Fukazawa Yoichi; born 21 June 1976) is a Japanese politician serving as a member of the House of Representatives since 2020. From 2011 to 2020, he was a member of the Shizuoka Prefectural Assembly.
