= Akihiko Yamamoto =

Japanese politician

- 山本 明彦
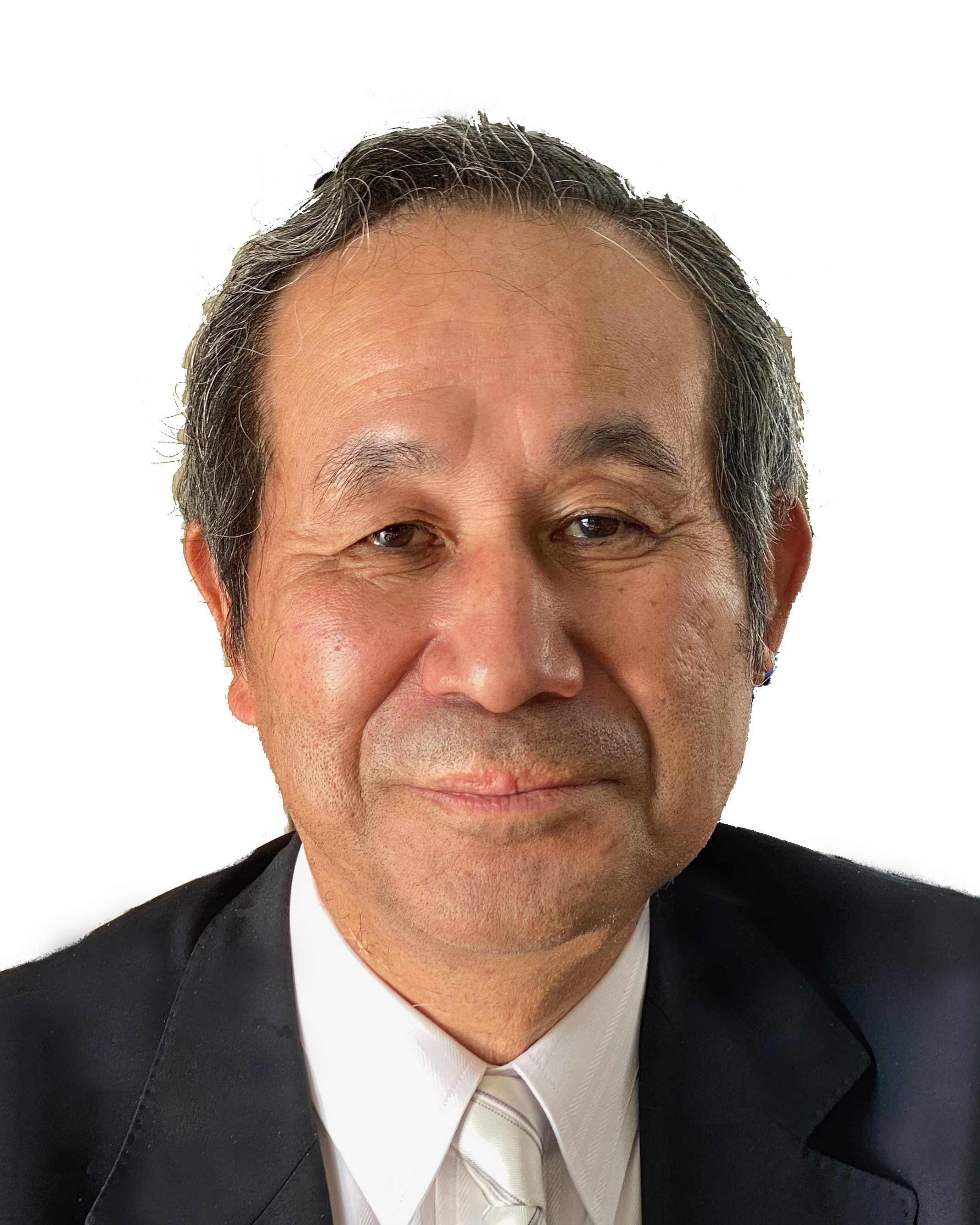
- Yamamoto in 2020

Member of the House of Representatives
- In office 25 June 2000 – 21 July 2009
- Preceded by: Keijirō Murata
- Succeeded by: Kazuyoshi Morimoto
- Constituency: Aichi 15th

Member of the Aichi Prefectural Assembly
- In office 30 April 1987 – 29 April 1999
- Constituency: Toyohashi City

Personal details
- Born: 1 April 1947 (age 79) Ichinomiya, Aichi, Japan
- Party: Liberal Democratic
- Education: Nagoya University

Akihiko Yamamoto (山本 明彦, Yamamoto Akihiko; born 1 April 1947) is a Japanese politician of the Liberal Democratic Party, who served as a member of the House of Representatives in the Diet (national legislature). A native of Aichi Prefecture and graduate of Nagoya University, he was elected to the first of his three terms in Aichi Prefectural Assembly in 1987 and then to the House of Representatives for the first time in 2000. He was defeated in the 2009 election by Kazuyoshi Morimoto of the Democratic Party of Japan.
