= Nobuko Motomura =

Japanese politician

- 本村 伸子

Member of the House of Representatives
- In office 19 December 2014 – 23 January 2026
- Preceded by: Kensho Sasaki
- Succeeded by: Multi-member district
- Constituency: Tōkai PR

Personal details
- Born: 20 October 1972 (age 53) Toyota, Aichi, Japan
- Party: Communist
- Education: Ryukoku University

Nobuko Motomura (Japanese: 本村 伸子, Hepburn: Motomura Nobuko; born 20 October 1972) is a Japanese politician of the Japanese Communist Party who served as a member of the House of Representatives from 2014 to 2026.

== Political positions ==
She is supportive of foreigner suffrage, giving foreigners living in Japan the right to vote, citing that the foreigners pay taxes and are a part of Japanese communities. She also supports the creation of a committee that would protect the human rights of foreign workers, as the current body, the International Training Cooperation Organization, has income that comes from the companies that commit violations of human rights of the foreign workers.
