= Koichiro Osada =

Japanese politician (born 1999)

- 長田 紘一郎
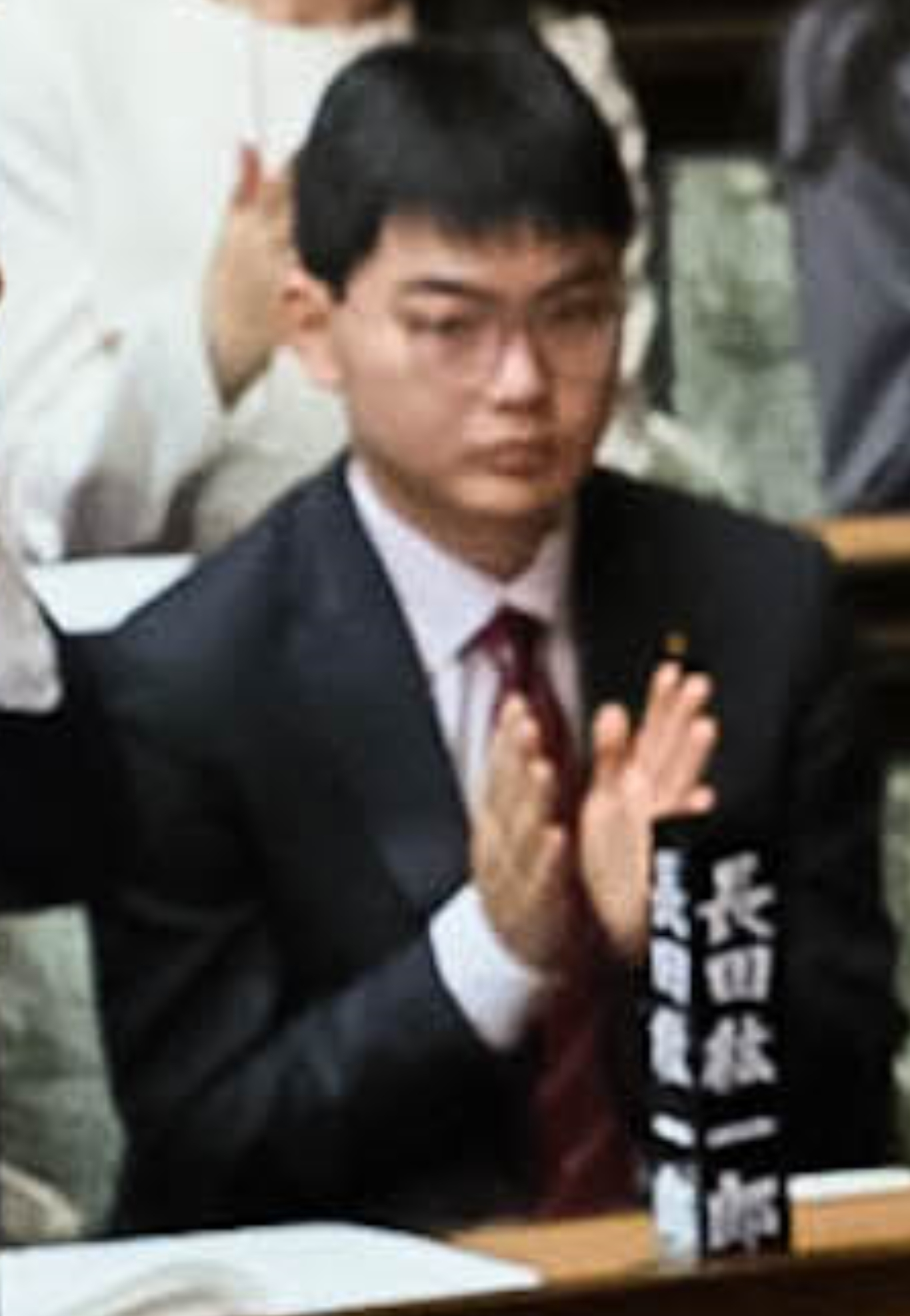
- Osada in 2026

Member of the House of Representatives
- Incumbent
- Assumed office 8 February 2026
- Constituency: Tōkai PR

Personal details
- Born: 26 October 1999 (age 26) Tokyo, Japan
- Party: Liberal Democratic
- Education: Waseda University

Koichiro Osada (長田紘一郎, Osada Koichiro; born 26 October 1999) is a Japanese politician serving as a member of the House of Representatives since 2026. Until 2026, he served as secretary to Goshi Hosono.
