= Rie Saito =

Japanese politician

- 斉藤 里恵
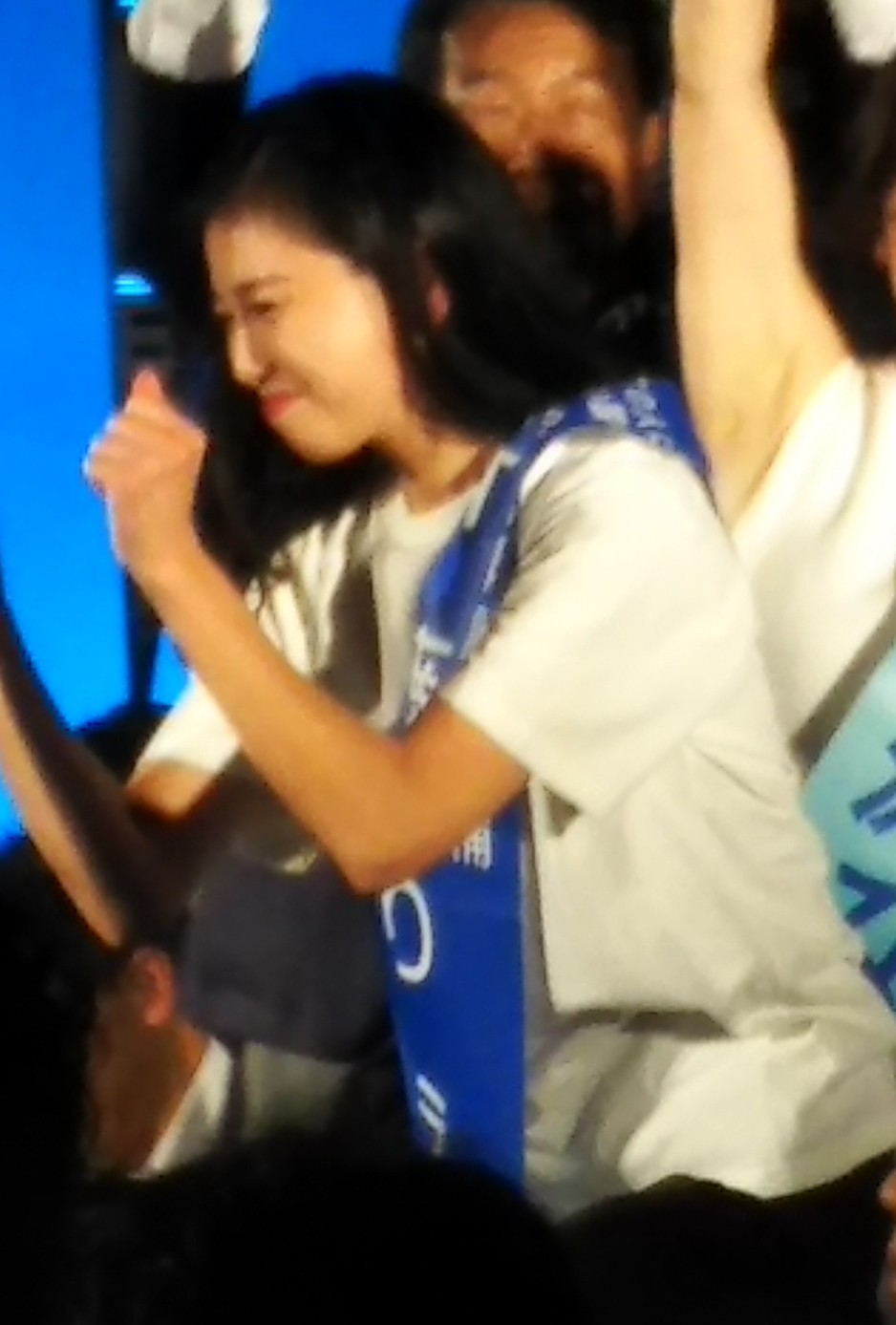
- Saito in 2019

Member of the House of Representatives
- Incumbent
- Assumed office 9 February 2026
- Preceded by: Multi-member district
- Constituency: Tōkai PR

Member of the Tokyo Metropolitan Assembly
- In office 4 July 2021 – 22 June 2025
- Constituency: Ōta Ward

Member of the Kita Ward Assembly
- In office 1 May 2015 – 30 April 2019

Personal details
- Born: 3 February 1984 (age 42) Aomori, Japan
- Party: LDP (since 2025)
- Other political affiliations: AEJ (2015–2018); Independent (2018–2019); CDP (2019–2025)

Rie Saito (斉藤 里恵, Saito Rie; born 3 February 1984) is a Japanese politician and author. Having lost her hearing as an infant, she wrote a best-selling book about her experience working at a host club, where she communicated with patrons using a notepad and pen.

== Early life ==
Saito was born on 3 February 1984, in Aomori, Japan. She lost her hearing after contracting meningitis as an infant. According to her autobiography, "Hitsudan Hostess", she was a juvenile delinquent throughout her teens.

== Career ==
In 2007, Saito moved to Tokyo and began working as a hostess in a high-end club in Ginza. She communicated with her patrons using a notepad and pen, and became the most popular hostess at the bar. She published "Hitsudan Hostess" in 2009. The book was adapted into a television drama starring Keiko Kitagawa in 2010. In 2010, Saito gave birth to a child in Hawaii and wrote a book about that experience as well.

Saito ran for office in 2015, and was elected to Tokyo's Kita Ward Assembly. Some of the systems in the legislature had to be changed to provide Saito equal access to what was being said. Basically, when a hearing person spoke into the microphone, a speech to text software would convert it to text displayed on a tablet. A person who isn't able to speak would be able to reply by typing their comment into the system, which would read it out loud. While the system works well when someone is giving a scripted speech, the speech to text software had a harder time keeping up with conversational committee meetings.

Saito ran for the House of Councillors in 2019, representing the Constitutional Democratic Party of Japan. Her goal was to reduce barriers for the disabled, much like Yasuhiko Funago and Eiko Kimura, who ran at the same time. However, Saito was not elected. She ran for her old seat in the Kita Ward Assembly in May 2020, but didn't win that election either.

Saito ran for office again in 2021, and was elected as the member of Tokyo Metropolitan Assembly, representing Ōta Ward. Regarding the change of electoral district from Kita Ward, which was her traditional base, the party’s Secretary-General, Tetsuro Fukuyama, explained, “She had a strong attachment to Kita Ward. However, she and the Tokyo chapter also agreed, and she decided to run in Ōta Ward.”

Saito later ran for the House of Representatives in 2026 as she representing Tōkai proportional representation block, having switched to Liberal Democratic Party.
