= Shizuo Yamashita =

Japanese politician

- 山下 史守朗

Member of the House of Representatives
- Incumbent
- Assumed office 10 February 2026
- Preceded by: Toru Fukuta
- Constituency: Aichi 16th

6th Mayor of Komaki
- In office 26 February 2011 – 27 January 2026
- Preceded by: Naoki Nakano
- Succeeded by: Masaki Amano

Member of the Aichi Prefectural Assembly
- In office 30 April 2003 – 30 January 2011
- Constituency: Komaki City

Personal details
- Born: 6 July 1975 (age 51) Komaki, Aichi, Japan
- Party: Liberal Democratic
- Education: Ritsumeikan University
- Website: shizuo-y.jp

Shizuo Yamashita (山下 史守朗, Yamashita Shizuo; born 6 July 1975) is a Japanese politician of the Liberal Democratic Party who has served as a member of the House of Representatives for Aichi 16th district since 2026. He previously served as a member of the Aichi Prefectural Assembly and as mayor of Komaki.

== Early life ==
Yamashita was born in Komaki, Aichi Prefecture, on 6 July 1975. He attended Komaki Elementary School, Komaki Junior High School, Aichi Prefectural Asahigaoka High School, and graduated from the College of Policy Science at Ritsumeikan University.

== Parliamentary career ==
Yamashita was elected to the Aichi Prefectural Assembly from the Komaki constituency in 2003, and served for two terms until January 2011.

He was elected mayor of Komaki in February 2011 at the age of 35, becoming the city's sixth mayor. He was re-elected to a fourth term in 2023. In January 2026 he resigned as mayor to contest the 2026 Japanese general election, standing as the Liberal Democratic Party candidate in Aichi 16th district. He won the seat in the February 2026 general election.

== Personal life ==
Yamashita is closely associated with civic and cultural organizations in his home region. His official profile lists him as honorary chairman of the NPO Chubu Philharmonic Orchestra.
