= Aichi 15th district =

Constituency of Aichi Prefecture, Japan

- Parliamentary constituency for the Japanese House of Representatives
- Numbered map of Aichi Prefecture single-member districts
- Prefecture: Aichi
- Proportional District: Tokai
- Electorate: 345,133

Current constituency
- Created: 1994
- Seats: One
- Party: Liberal Democratic
- Representative: Yukinori Nemoto
- Municipalities: Toyohashi and Tahara.

Aichi 15th district (愛知県第15区, Aichi-ken dai-ju-goku or simply 愛知15区, Aichi-ken ju-goku) is a single-member constituency of the House of Representatives in the national Diet of Japan located in Aichi Prefecture.

== Areas covered ==
=== since 2013 ===
- Toyohashi
- Tahara

=== 1994–2013 ===
- Toyohashi
- Atsumi District

== List of representatives ==
Election	Representative	Party	Notes
1996	Keijirō Murata	Liberal Democratic	
2000	Akihiko Yamamoto	Liberal Democratic	
2003	Akihiko Yamamoto	Liberal Democratic	
2005	Akihiko Yamamoto	Liberal Democratic	
2009	Kazuyoshi Morimoto	Democratic	
2012	Yukinori Nemoto	Liberal Democratic	
2014	Yukinori Nemoto	Liberal Democratic	
2017	Yukinori Nemoto	Liberal Democratic	
2021	Yukinori Nemoto	Liberal Democratic	
2024	Yukinori Nemoto	Liberal Democratic	
2026	Yukinori Nemoto	Liberal Democratic	

== Election results ==
=== 2026 ===
2026
Party	Candidate	Votes	%	±%
LDP	Yukinori Nemoto	88,028	43.6	▲4.9
Centrist Reform	Chiho Koyama	36,614	18.1	▼5.2
Ishin	Kenichirō Seki (elected in Tōkai PR block)	35,736	17.7	▼6.8
Sanseitō	Katsuhiro Suzuki	19,022	9.4	
Genzei–Yukoku	Yūko Takekami	12,892	6.4	
Reiwa	Megumu Tsuji	9,835	4.9	▼5.0
Registered electors		338,422		
Turnout			60.63	▲5.61
LDP hold				

=== 2024 ===
2024
Party	Candidate	Votes	%	±%
Liberal Democratic (endorsed by Komeito)	Yukinori Nemoto (incumbent)	71,012	38.69	▼13.72
Innovation	Kenichiro Seki	44,945	24.49	new
CDP	Chiho Koyama (won PR seat)	42,837	23.34	▼17.29
Reiwa	Megumu Tsuji	17,529	9.55	▲2.59
Communist	Shigeru Takagi	7,220	3.93	New
Majority		26,067	14.20	▲2.42
Registered electors		341,614		
Turnout		183,543	55.02	▼3.08
LDP hold				

=== 2021 ===
2021
Party	Candidate	Votes	%	±%
Liberal Democratic (endorsed by Komeito)	Yukinori Nemoto (incumbent)	104,204	52.41	
CDP	Kenichiro Seki (PR seat incumbent)	80,776	40.63	New
Reiwa	Ryu Sugaya	13,832	6.96	New
Majority		23,428	11.78	
Registered electors		348,761		
Turnout			58.10	▲2.67
LDP hold				

=== 2017 ===
2017
Party	Candidate	Votes	%	±%
Liberal Democratic (endorsed by Komeito)	Yukinori Nemoto (incumbent)	95,568	49.94	
Kibō no Tō	Kenichiro Seki (won PR seat)	77,224	40.35	New
Communist	Yasuyuki Nozawa	18,574	9.71	
Majority		18,344	9.59	
Registered electors		353,398		
Turnout			55.43	▼0.35
LDP hold				

=== 2014 ===
2014
Party	Candidate	Votes	%	±%
Liberal Democratic	Yukinori Nemoto (incumbent)	97,152	52.58	
Democratic	Kenichiro Seki	64,480	34.90	
Communist	Shingo Kushida	23,143	12.52	
Majority		32,672	17.68	
Registered electors		346,433		
Turnout			55.08	▼4.51
LDP hold				

=== 2012 ===
2012
Party	Candidate	Votes	%	±%
Liberal Democratic	Yukinori Nemoto	73,521	36.57	
Democratic (endorsed by PNP)	Kazuyoshi Morimoto (incumbent)	49,053	24.40	
Restoration (endorsed by Your)	Gō Kondo	39,018	19.41	New
Independent	Motoshi Sugita	21,112	10.50	New
Communist	Shingo Kushida	10,404	5.18	
Social Democratic	Yachiyo Toyoda	7,927	3.94	New
Majority		24,468	12.17	
Registered electors		346,245		
Turnout			59.59	▼11.11
LDP gain from Democratic				

=== 2009 ===
2009
Party	Candidate	Votes	%	±%
Democratic	Kazuyoshi Morimoto	127,059	52.89	
Liberal Democratic	Akihiko Yamamoto (incumbent)	94,803	39.46	
Communist	Hiromu Saito	14,595	6.08	
Happiness Realization	Nobuhiro Takahashi	3,781	1.57	New
Majority		32,256	13.43	
Registered electors		344,911		
Turnout			70.70	▲4.61
Democratic gain from LDP				

=== 2005 ===
2005
Party	Candidate	Votes	%	±%
Liberal Democratic	Akihiko Yamamoto (incumbent)	122,904	56.36	
Democratic	Kazuyoshi Morimoto	74,932	34.36	
Communist	Hiromu Saito	20,219	9.27	
Majority		47,972	22.00	
Registered electors		337,090		
Turnout			66.09	▲4.93
LDP hold				

=== 2003 ===
2003
Party	Candidate	Votes	%	±%
Liberal Democratic	Akihiko Yamamoto (incumbent)	100,443	50.31	
Democratic	Yuzuru Tsuzuki (PR seat incumbent) (won PR seat)	84,573	42.36	
Communist	Hiromu Saito	14,622	7.32	
Majority		15,870	7.95	
Registered electors		333,169		
Turnout			61.16	
LDP hold				

=== 2000 ===
2000
Party	Candidate	Votes	%	±%
Liberal Democratic	Akihiko Yamamoto	96,086	48.88	
Democratic	Gō Kondo	77,344	39.35	New
Communist	Hiromu Saito	20,700	10.53	
Liberal League	Junichi Hirayama	2,431	1.24	New
Majority		18,742	9.53	
Turnout				
LDP hold				

=== 1996 ===
1996
Party	Candidate	Votes	%	±%
Liberal Democratic	Keijiro Murata	74,963	45.30	New
New Frontier	Yoshitake Kimata	64,486	38.97	New
Communist	Eiji Tsukada	22,851	13.81	New
People's Party	Shigeko Matsumoto	1,796	1.09	New
Culture Forum	Masatoshi Matsushita	1,398	0.84	New
Majority		10,477	6.33	
Turnout				
LDP win (new seat)				
