= Masato Imai =

Japanese politician (born 1962)

- 今井 雅人
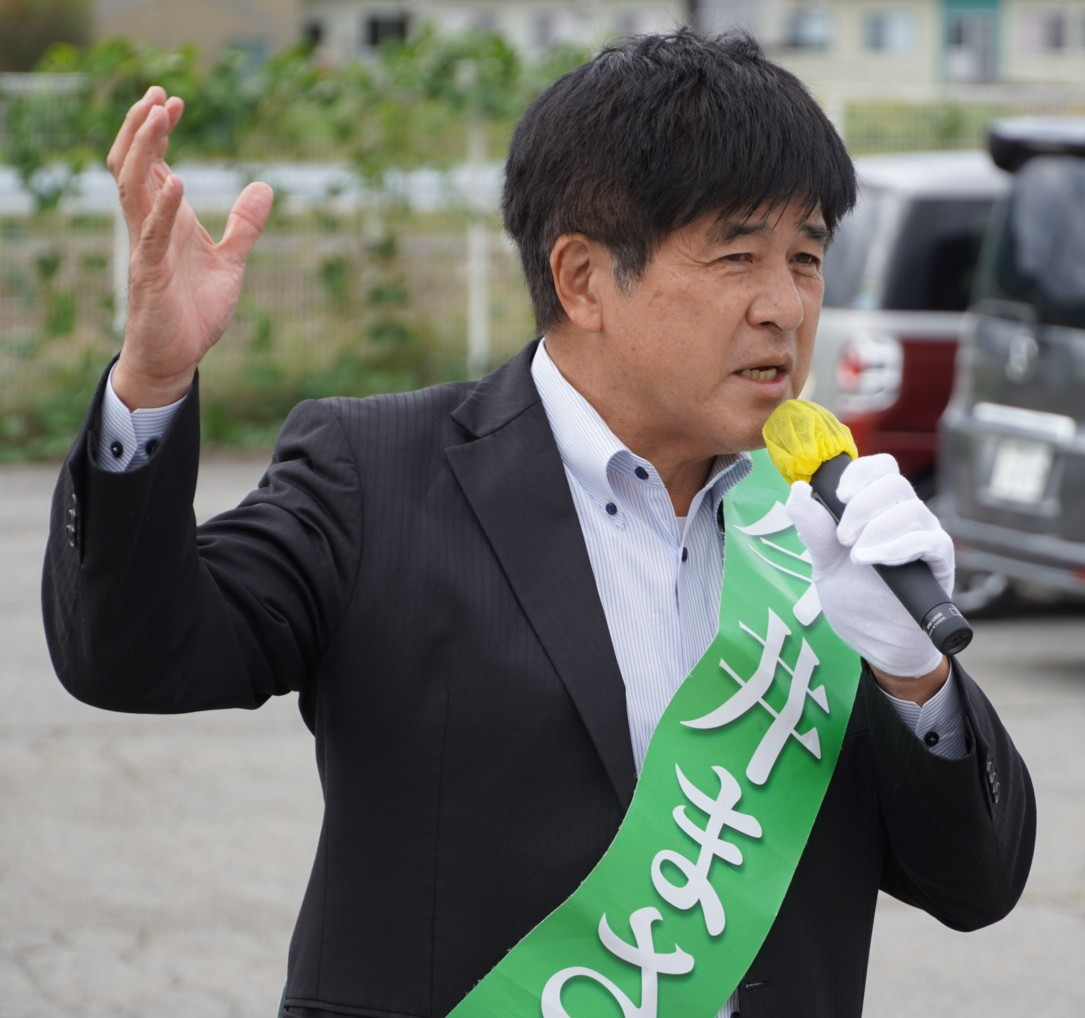
- Imai in 2024

Member of the House of Representatives
- In office 29 October 2024 – 23 January 2026
- Preceded by: Shunpei Kaneko
- Succeeded by: Hirohiro Kato
- Constituency: Gifu 4th
- In office 31 August 2009 – 14 October 2021
- Constituency: Tōkai PR

Personal details
- Born: 21 February 1962 (age 64) Gero, Gifu, Japan
- Party: CRA (since 2026)
- Other political affiliations: DPJ (2009–2012); JRP (2012–2014); JIP (2014–2016); DP (2016–2017); KnT (2017–2018); DPP (2018); Independent (2018–2020); CDP (2020–2026)
- Education: Sophia University
- Website: 今井雅人公式サイト「今井雅人が行く！」

Imai Masato (今井 雅人, Imai Masato; born 21 February 1962) is a Japanese politician of the Constitutional Democratic Party, who served as a member of the House of Representatives in the Diet (national legislature).

A native of Gero, Gifu he attended Sophia University as an undergraduate. Upon graduation, he joined Sanwa Bank in 1985 and worked in Chicago, Illinois for five years from 1989. He entered The Bank of Tokyo-Mitsubishi UFJ in 2004 as a currency trader. In 2009 he was elected to the House of Representatives for the first time and has been subsequently re-elected in 2012, 2014 and 2017.
