= Aichi 12th district =

Legislative district of Japan

- Parliamentary constituency for the Japanese House of Representatives
- Numbered map of Aichi Prefecture single-member districts
- Prefecture: Aichi
- Proportional District: Tōkai
- Electorate: 444,148

Current constituency
- Created: 1994
- Seats: One
- Party: LDP
- Representative: Shūhei Aoyama
- Municipalities: Okazaki and Nishio.

Aichi 12th district (愛知県第12区, Aichi-ken dai-ju-niku or simply 愛知12区, Aichi ju-niku) is a single-member constituency of the House of Representatives in the national Diet of Japan located in Aichi Prefecture.

== Areas covered ==
=== since 2017 ===
- Okazaki
- Nishio

=== 2013 – 2017 ===
- Okazaki
- Nishio
- Nukata District

=== 1994 – 2013 ===
- Okazaki
- Nishio
- Nukata District
- Hazu District

== List of representatives ==
Election	Representative	Party	Notes
1996	Seiken Sugiura	Liberal Democratic	
2000	Seiken Sugiura	Liberal Democratic	
2003	Seiken Sugiura	Liberal Democratic	
2005	Seiken Sugiura	Liberal Democratic	
2009	Yasuhiro Nakane	Democratic	
2012	Shūhei Aoyama	LDP	
2014	Kazuhiko Shigetoku	Innovation	
2014	Kazuhiko Shigetoku	Independent	
2014	Kazuhiko Shigetoku	Vision of Reform	
2014	Kazuhiko Shigetoku	Democratic	
2017	Kazuhiko Shigetoku	Independent	
2021	Kazuhiko Shigetoku	CDP	
2024	Kazuhiko Shigetoku	CDP	
2026	Shūhei Aoyama	LDP	

== Election results ==
=== 2026 ===
2026
Party	Candidate	Votes	%	±%
LDP	Shūhei Aoyama	128,453	47.0	▲12.8
Centrist Reform	Kazuhiko Shigetoku (elected in Tōkai PR block)	107,130	39.2	▼11.3
Sanseitō	Hiroto Nakagawa	37,684	13.8	
Registered electors		440,188		
Turnout			63.17	▲5.12
LDP gain from Centrist Reform				

=== 2024 ===
2024
Party	Candidate	Votes	%	±%
CDP	Kazuhiko Shigetoku	126,940	50.46	▼2.21
Liberal Democratic	Shūhei Aoyama	86,025	34.19	▼13.14
Innovation	Hiroto Nakagawa	28,429	11.32	
Communist	Hisakazu Seki	10,118	4.02	New
Majority		40,915	16.27	▲10.93
Registered electors		442,431		
Turnout		251,572	58.05	▼3.92
CDP hold				

=== 2021 ===
2021
Party	Candidate	Votes	%	±%
CDP	Kazuhiko Shigetoku (incumbent)	142,536	52.67	New
Liberal Democratic (endorsed by Komeito)	Shūhei Aoyama (PR seat incumbent) (won PR seat)	128,083	47.33	
Majority		14,453	5.34	
Registered electors		444,780		
Turnout			61.97	▲0.25
CDP hold				

=== 2017 ===
2017
Party	Candidate	Votes	%	±%
Independent	Kazuhiko Shigetoku (incumbent)	149,587	55.65	New
Liberal Democratic (endorsed by Komeito)	Shūhei Aoyama (PR seat incumbent)	104,811	39.00	
Communist	Isao Miyaji	14,378	5.35	
Majority		44,776	16.65	
Registered electors		444,298		
Turnout			61.72	▲0.82
Independent hold				

- Aoyama was additionally elected by Tokai proportional representation block following Sei Ōmi's resignation(running in a Anjō mayoral election).

=== 2014 ===
2014
Party	Candidate	Votes	%	±%
Innovation	Kazuhiko Shigetoku (PR seat incumbent)	131,618	48.49	New
Liberal Democratic (endorsed by Komeito)	Shūhei Aoyama (incumbent) (won PR seat)	118,165	43.54	
Communist	Jiro Makino	21,637	7.97	
Majority		13,453	4.95	
Registered electors		458,221		
Turnout			60.90	▼2.95
Ishin gain from LDP				

=== 2012 ===
2012
Party	Candidate	Votes	%	±%
Liberal Democratic (endorsed by Komeito)	Shūhei Aoyama	91,816	32.34	
Democratic (endorsed by PNP)	Yasuhiro Nakane (incumbent) (won PR seat)	82,363	29.01	
Restoration (endorsed by Your)	Kazuhiko Shigetoku (won PR seat)	69,198	24.37	New
Tomorrow (endorsed by Daichi)	Yuzuru Tsuzuki (PR seat incumbent)	30,850	10.87	New
Communist	Haruji Wakayama	9,687	3.41	
Majority		9,453	3.33	
Registered electors		454,656		
Turnout			63.85	▼10.22
LDP gain from Democratic				

=== 2009 ===
2009
Party	Candidate	Votes	%	±%
Democratic	Yasuhiro Nakane	180,972	55.36	
Liberal Democratic	Seiken Sugiura (incumbent)	122,198	37.38	
Communist	Hiroko Hatta	20,551	6.29	
Happiness Realization	Yoshiki Gokan	3,171	0.97	New
Majority		58,774	17.98	
Registered electors		448,205		
Turnout			74.07	▲2.99
Democratic gain from LDP				

=== 2005 ===
2005
Party	Candidate	Votes	%	±%
Liberal Democratic	Seiken Sugiura (incumbent)	159,256	52.62	
Democratic	Yasuhiro Nakane (PR seat incumbent)	128,681	42.52	
Communist	Noboru Hagiwara	14,708	4.86	
Majority		30,575	10.10	
Registered electors		432,843		
Turnout			71.08	▲6.44
LDP hold				

=== 2003 ===
2003
Party	Candidate	Votes	%	±%
Liberal Democratic	Seiken Sugiura (incumbent)	135,622	50.38	
Democratic	Yasuhiro Nakane (won PR seat)	117,411	43.61	
Communist	Noriko Nomura	16,191	6.01	
Majority		18,211	6.77	
Registered electors		424,973		
Turnout			64.64	
LDP hold				

=== 2000 ===
2000
Party	Candidate	Votes	%	±%
Liberal Democratic	Seiken Sugiura (incumbent)	117,475	45.56	
Democratic	Yasuhiro Nakane	81,826	31.73	New
Liberal	Yuzuru Tsuzuki (won PR seat)	33,052	12.82	New
Communist	Noriko Nomura	21,581	8.37	
Liberal League	Takashi Kawashima	2,517	0.98	New
Independent	Akira Fukuda	1,422	0.55	New
Majority		35,649	13.83	
Turnout				
LDP hold				

=== 1996 ===
1996
Party	Candidate	Votes	%	±%
Liberal Democratic	Seiken Sugiura	133,257	55.16	New
New Frontier	Minoru Kawashima	79,950	33.10	New
Communist	Masumi Yamada	28,358	11.74	New
Majority		53,307	22.06	
Turnout				
LDP win (new seat)				
