= Kazuhiko Shigetoku =

Japanese politician (born 1970)

- 重徳 和彦
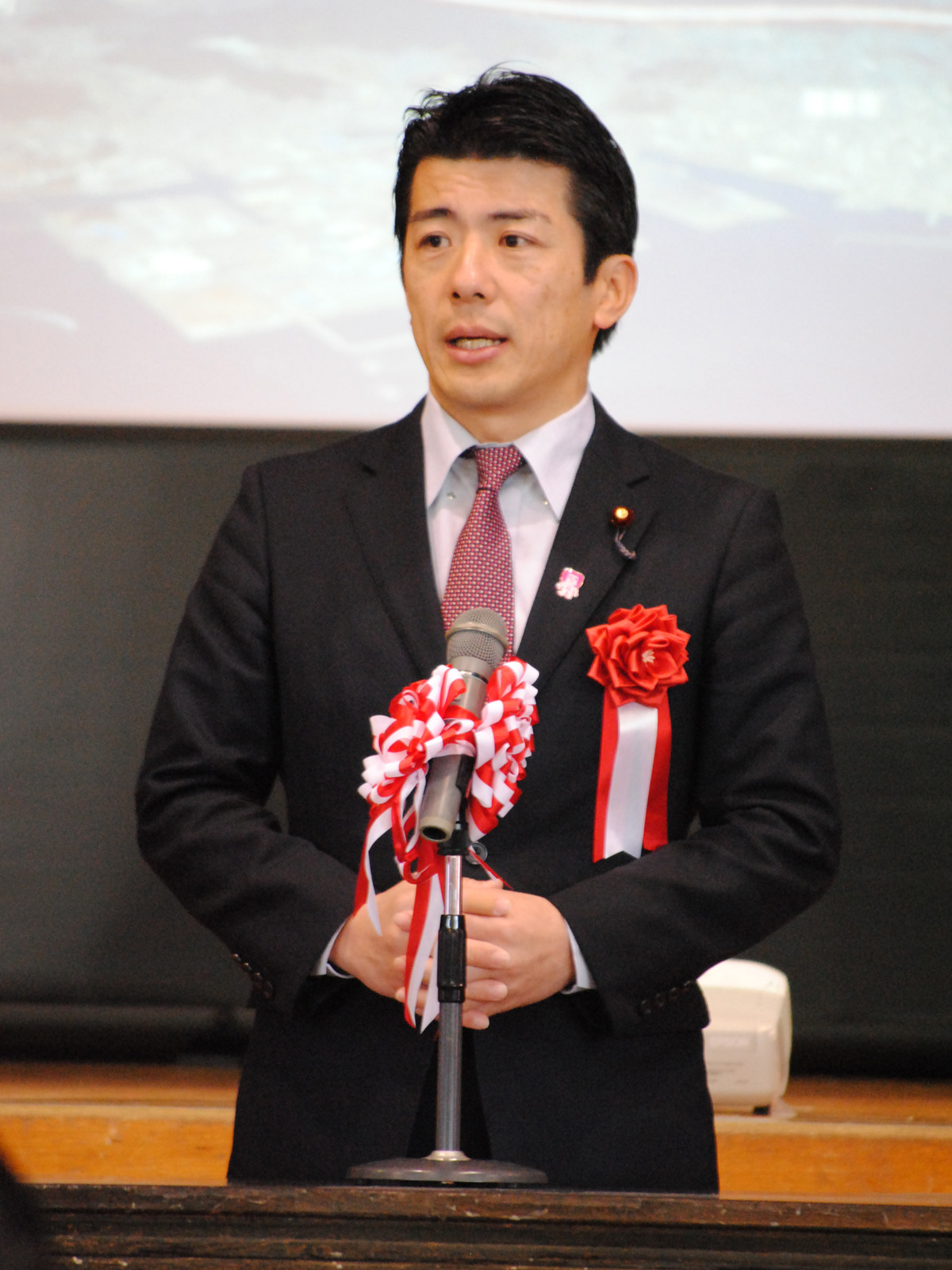
- Shigetoku in 2014

Member of the House of Representatives
- Incumbent
- Assumed office 16 December 2012
- Preceded by: Multi-member district
- Constituency: Tōkai PR (2012–2014); Aichi 12th (2014–2026); Tōkai PR (2026–present)

Personal details
- Born: 21 December 1970 (age 55) Toyota, Aichi, Japan
- Party: DRP (since 2026)
- Other political affiliations: Independent (2011–2012); JRP (2012–2014); JIP (2014–2015); VoR (2015–2016); DP (2016–2017); Independent (2017–2019); GoI (2019–2020); CDP (2020–2026); CRA (2026)
- Education: University of Tokyo

Kazuhiko Shigetoku (重徳 和彦, Shigetoku Kazuhiro; born 21 December 1970) is a Japanese politician who is a member of the House of Representatives of Japan. He is the fourth chair of the Policy Research Council of the Constitutional Democratic Party of Japan and concurrently serves as shadow Chief Cabinet Secretary alongside it. He is also the leader of the Direct Admonition Society, a faction in the CDP, and acts as representative of the CDP's Aichi Prefecture Federation.

== Biography ==
He was elected in 2012.
