= Shizuoka 2nd district =

Electoral district in Japan

Shizuoka 2nd District
- 静岡県第2区
- Parliamentary constituency for the Japanese House of Representatives
- Proportional District: Tōkai
- Electorate: 378,801 (September 2022)

Current constituency
- Created: 1994
- Seats: One
- Party: LDP

Shizuoka 2nd district is a single-member constituency of the House of Representatives, the lower house of the National Diet of Japan. The district is located in Shizuoka Prefecture, and covers the cities of Shimada, Yaizu, Fujieda and Makinohara as well as the district of Haibara. As of 2022, the district was home to 378,801 constituents.

Before 1996, the area had been part of the five-member Shizuoka 1st district. The first representative Shōgō Harada had represented the pre-reform 1st district since 1976. He was later succeeded by his son Yoshitsugu Harada. The district is currently represented by Tatsunori Ibayashi of the Liberal Democratic Party.

== List of representatives ==
Representative	Party	Dates	Notes
Shōzō Harada	LDP	1996–2003	
Yoshitsugu Harada	LDP	2003–2009	Lost re-election
Shōgo Tsugawa	DPJ	2009–2012	Lost re-election
Tatsunori Ibayashi	LDP	2012–	

== Election results ==
2026
Party	Candidate	Votes	%	±%
LDP	Tatsunori Ibayashi	152,012	71.06	▲16.01
Centrist Reform	Takeyuki Suzuki	61,915	28.94	▲5.10
Registered electors		367,097		
Turnout		213,927	60.40	▲3.51
LDP hold				

2024
Party	Candidate	Votes	%	±%
LDP	Tatsunori Ibayashi	113,419	55.0	▼6.1
CDP	Takeyuki Suzuki	70,131	34.0	▲0.9
Sanseitō	Daisuke Sagesaka	22,486	10.9	
Registered electors		371,333		
Turnout			56.89	▲0.78
LDP hold				

2021
Party	Candidate	Votes	%	±%
LDP	Tatsunori Ibayashi	131,082	61.1	▲3.9
CDP	Takashi Fukumura	71,032	33.1	
JCP	Yūki Yamaguchi	12,396	5.8	▼3.9
Registered electors		388,436		
Turnout			56.11	▼2.81
LDP hold				
