= Toru Fukuta =

Japanese politician (born 1982)

- 福田 徹
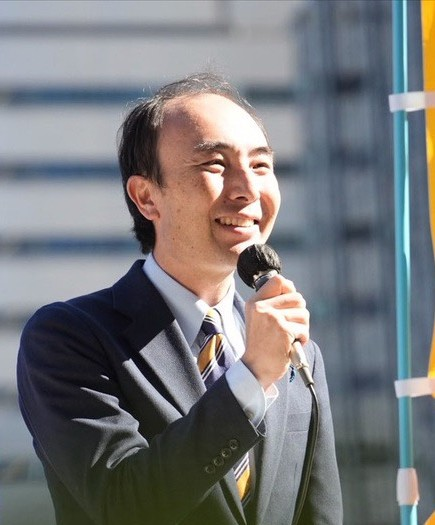
- Toru Fukuta in 2025

Member of the House of Representatives
- Incumbent
- Assumed office 29 October 2024
- Preceded by: Constituency established
- Constituency: Aichi 16th (2024–2026); Tōkai PR (2026–present)

Personal details
- Born: 2 June 1982 (age 44) Kani, Gifu, Japan
- Party: DPP
- Education: Mie University; Graduate School of Management, Globis University

Toru Fukuta (福田徹, Fukuta Toru; born 2 June 1982) is a Japanese politician serving as a member of the House of Representatives since 2024. From 2017 to 2022, he served as EMS medical director of the Japanese Red Cross Nagoya Daini Hospital.
