= Tatsunori Ibayashi =

Japanese politician (born 1976)

- 井林 辰憲
- Official portrait, 2025

Minister of Land, Infrastructure, Transport and Tourism
- Incumbent
- Assumed office 17 September 2026
- Prime Minister: Sanae Takaichi
- Preceded by: Yasushi Kaneko

Member of the House of Representatives
- Incumbent
- Assumed office 18 December 2012
- Preceded by: Shōgo Tsugawa
- Constituency: Shizuoka 2nd

Personal details
- Born: 18 July 1976 (age 50) Tokyo, Japan
- Party: Liberal Democratic (Shikōkai)
- Education: Kyoto University

Tatsunori Ibayashi (井林辰憲, Ibayashi Tatsunori; born 18 July 1976) is a Japanese politician serving as a member of the House of Representatives since 2012. From 2024 to 2025, he served as chairman of the finance committee.
