= Yukinori Nemoto =

Japanese politician (born 1965)

- 根本 幸典
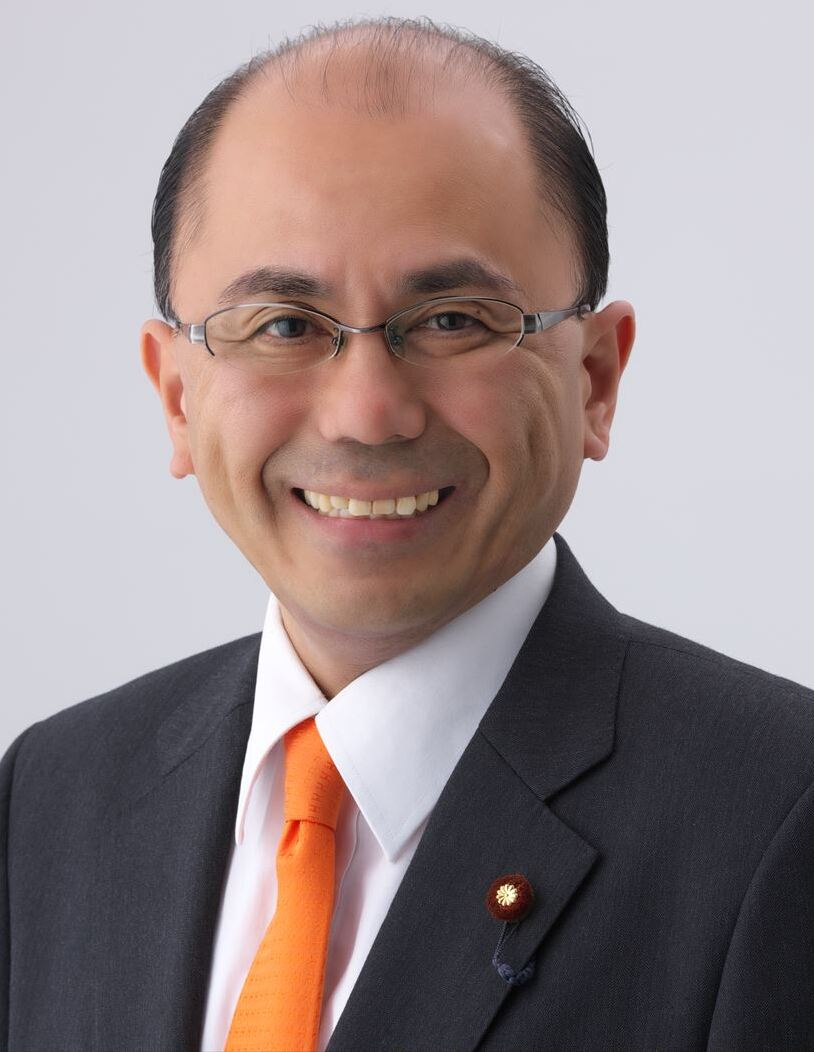
- Official portrait, 2016

Member of the House of Representatives
- Incumbent
- Assumed office 18 December 2012
- Preceded by: Kazuyoshi Morimoto
- Constituency: Aichi 15th

Member of the Toyohashi City Council
- In office 1 May 2003 – 30 April 2011

Personal details
- Born: 21 February 1965 (age 61) Sunagawa, Hokkaido, Japan
- Party: Liberal Democratic
- Education: Hitotsubashi University

Yukinori Nemoto (根本幸典, Nemoto Yukinori; born 21 February 1965) is a Japanese politician serving as a member of the House of Representatives since 2012. From 2003 to 2011, he was a city councillor of Toyohashi.
