= Tōkai proportional representation block =

Japanese House of Representatives constituency

Tokai Proportional Representation Block
- Parliamentary constituency for the Japanese House of Representatives
- Map of House of Representatives proportional blocks, with the Tōkai block highlighted
- Prefectures: Gifu, Shizuoka, Aichi, and Mie
- Electorate: 12,041,518 (2026)

Current constituency
- Created: 1994
- Number of members: 21

The Tōkai proportional representation block (Hirei [daihyō] tōkai burokku (比例東海ブロック)) is one of eleven proportional representation (PR) "blocks", multi-member constituencies for the House of Representatives in the Diet of Japan. It consists of the Tōkai region, and consists of the prefectures of Gifu, Shizuoka, Aichi, and Mie. Following the introduction of proportional voting, Tōkai elected 23 representatives by PR in the 1996 general election, reduced to 21 in the election of 2000 when the total number of PR seats was reduced from 200 to 180.

== Results timeline ==
=== Vote share ===
Party	1996	2000	2003	2005	2009	2012	2014	2017	2021	2024	2026
NFP	33.04										
LDP	32.03	28.63	34.58	38.56	26.12	27.56	33.30	33.21	37.39	26.39	37.65
DPJ (Note: 1996 DP)	14.98	30.63	40.77	34.80	46.26	18.53	23.13				
JCP	11.85	9.96	6.73	6.32	5.83	5.43	9.59	6.69	6.07	5.14	3.47
SDP	5.93	7.39	3.69	3.78	3.17	1.91	1.99	1.00	1.25	1.39	0.91
Komeito		11.65	14.23	12.42	10.67	10.93	12.47	11.59	11.67	10.23	
LP		9.73									
Nippon				4.12	0.87						
Your					4.84	9.03					
PNP					1.56						
Ishin (Note: 2012 JRP, 2014 JIP)						19.02	14.95	4.42	10.32	6.57	5.74
TPJ						7.16					
PLP							1.65				
KnT								21.45			
CDP								21.05	22.08	22.65	
DPFP									5.69	13.17	11.98
Reiwa									4.06	7.78	3.14
CPJ										3.93	2.51
Sanseitō										2.75	7.56
CRA											17.19
Mirai											6.85
Others	2.17 (Note: NSP 1.25, LL 0.92)	2.01 (Note: NCP 1.31, LL 0.69)			0.68 (Note: HRP 0.68)	0.42 (Note: HRP 0.42)	2.92 (Note: Generations 2.28, HRP 0.64)	0.57 (Note: HRP 0.57)	1.46 (Note: NHK 1.46)		3.00 (Note: Genyu 3.00)
Turnout		63.85	61.76	68.46	70.73	60.43	54.62	55.62	55.99	55.09	58.70

=== Seat distribution ===
Election	Distribution	Seats
1996		23
2000		21
2003		21
2005		21
2009		21
2012		21
2014		21
2017		21
2021		21
2024		21
2026		21

== Election results ==
=== 2026 ===
2026 results in the Tokai PR block
Party	Votes	Swing	%	Seats	+/–
Liberal Democratic Party (LDP)	2,628,008	37.65	▲11.26	10	▲3
Centrist Reform Alliance (CRA) (Note: Swings compared to CDP and Komeito)	1,199,580	17.19	▼15.69	4	▼4
Democratic Party For the People (DPFP)	836,102	11.98	▼1.19	3	▲2
Sanseitō	527,291	7.56	▲4.81	2	▲2
Team Mirai	478,316	6.85	New	1	New
Japan Innovation Party (Ishin)	400,964	5.74	▼0.83	1	0
Japanese Communist Party (JCP)	241,848	3.47	▼1.67	0	▼1
Reiwa Shinsengumi (Reiwa)	218,838	3.14	▼4.64	0	▼2
Tax Cuts Japan and Yukoku Alliance (Genyu)	209,174	3.00	New	0	New
Conservative Party of Japan (CPJ)	175,506	2.51	▼1.42	0	▼1
Social Democratic Party (SDP)	63,729	0.91	▼0.48	0	0
Total	6,979,356	100.00		21	
Invalid votes	89,474	1.27			
Turnout	7,068,830	58.70	▲3.61		
Registered voters	12,041,518				

=== 2024 ===
2024 results in the Tokai PR block
Party	Votes	Swing	%	Seats	+/–
Liberal Democratic Party (LDP)	1,717,737	26.39	▼11.00	7	▼2
Constitutional Democratic Party of Japan (CDP)	1,474,091	22.65	▲0.56	6	▲1
Democratic Party For the People (DPFP)	856,909	13.17	▲7.48	1	0
Komeito	665,939	10.23	▼1.43	2	▼1
Reiwa Shinsengumi (Reiwa)	506,112	7.78	▲3.72	2	▲2
Japan Innovation Party (Ishin)	427,368	6.57	▼3.76	1	▼1
Japanese Communist Party (JCP)	334,599	5.14	▼0.93	1	0
Conservative Party of Japan (CPJ)	255,726	3.93	New	1	New
Sanseitō	179,069	2.75	New	0	New
Social Democratic Party (SDP)	90,708	1.39	▲0.14	0	0
Total	6,508,258	100.00		21	
Invalid votes	170,351	2.55			
Turnout	6,678,609	55.09	▼0.90		
Registered voters	12,123,776				

=== 2021 ===
2021 results in the Tokai PR block
Party	Votes	Swing	%	Seats	+/–
Liberal Democratic Party (LDP)	2,515,841	37.39	▲4.18	9	▲1
Constitutional Democratic Party of Japan (CDP)	1,485,947	22.08	▲1.03	5	▲1
Komeito	784,976	11.67	▲0.07	3	▲1
Japan Innovation Party (Ishin)	694,630	10.32	▲5.90	2	▲1
Japanese Communist Party (JCP)	408,606	6.07	▼0.62	1	0
Democratic Party For the People (DPFP)	382,734	5.69	New	1	New
Reiwa Shinsengumi (Reiwa)	273,208	4.06	New	0	New
NHK Party	98,238	1.46	New	0	New
Social Democratic Party (SDP)	84,220	1.25	▲0.25	0	0
Total	6,728,400	100.00		21	
Invalid votes	159,687	2.32			
Turnout	6,888,087	55.99	▲0.37		
Registered voters	12,302,414				

=== 2017 ===
2017 results in the Tokai PR block
Party	Votes	Swing	%	Seats	+/–
Liberal Democratic Party (LDP)	2,237,838	33.21	▼0.09	8	0
Kibō no Tō	1,445,549	21.45	New	5	New
Constitutional Democratic Party of Japan (CDP)	1,418,633	21.05	New	4	New
Komeito	781,228	11.59	▼0.87	2	▼1
Japanese Communist Party (JCP)	450,970	6.69	▼2.90	1	▼1
Japan Innovation Party (Ishin)	297,759	4.42	New	1	New
Social Democratic Party (SDP)	67,445	1.00	▼0.99	0	0
Happiness Realization Party (HRP)	38,580	0.57	▼0.07	0	0
Total	6,738,002	100.00		21	
Invalid votes	157,432	2.28			
Turnout	6,895,434	55.62	▲1.01		
Registered voters	12,396,727				

=== 2014 ===
2014 results in the Tokai PR block
Party	Votes	Swing	%	Seats	+/–
Liberal Democratic Party (LDP)	2,147,672	33.30	▲5.74	8	▲1
Democratic Party of Japan (DPJ)	1,491,764	23.13	▲4.60	5	▲1
Japan Innovation Party (JIP)	964,240	14.95	▼4.07	3	▼1
Komeito	804,089	12.47	▲1.54	3	▲1
Japanese Communist Party (JCP)	618,695	9.59	▲4.16	2	▲1
Party for Future Generations	147,080	2.28	New	0	New
Social Democratic Party (SDP)	128,131	1.99	▲0.08	0	0
People's Life Party (PLP)	106,346	1.65	New	0	New
Happiness Realization Party (HRP)	41,429	0.64	▲0.23	0	0
Total	6,449,446	100.00		21	
Invalid votes	171,468	2.59			
Turnout	6,620,914	54.62	▼5.82		
Registered voters	12,122,808				

=== 2012 ===
2012 results in the Tokai PR block
Party	Votes	Swing	%	Seats	+/–
Liberal Democratic Party (LDP)	1,966,007	27.56	▲1.44	7	▲1
Japan Restoration Party (JRP)	1,356,970	19.02	New	4	New
Democratic Party of Japan (DPJ)	1,321,402	18.53	▼27.73	4	▼8
Komeito	779,577	10.93	▲0.26	2	0
Your Party	644,087	9.03	▲4.19	2	▲2
Tomorrow Party of Japan (TPJ)	511,048	7.16	New	1	New
Japanese Communist Party (JCP)	387,461	5.43	▼0.40	1	0
Social Democratic Party (SDP)	136,316	1.91	▼1.26	0	0
Happiness Realization Party (HRP)	29,739	0.42	▼0.27	0	0
Total	7,132,607	100.00		21	
Invalid votes	187,862	2.57			
Turnout	7,320,469	60.43	▼10.29		
Registered voters	12,113,325				

=== 2009 ===
2009 results in the Tokai PR block
Party	Votes	Swing	%	Seats	+/–
Democratic Party of Japan (DPJ)	3,864,328	46.26	▲11.46	12	▲4
Liberal Democratic Party (LDP)	2,182,422	26.12	▼12.44	6	▼3
Komeito	891,158	10.67	▼1.75	2	▼1
Japanese Communist Party (JCP)	486,974	5.83	▼0.49	1	0
Your Party	404,411	4.84	New	0	New
Social Democratic Party (SDP)	264,957	3.17	▼0.61	0	0
People's New Party (PNP)	130,212	1.56	New	0	New
New Party Nippon (Nippon)	72,485	0.87	▼3.25	0	0
Happiness Realization Party (HRP)	57,222	0.68	New	0	New
Total	8,354,169	100.00		21	
Invalid votes	193,832	2.27			
Turnout	8,548,001	70.73	▲2.27		
Registered voters	12,086,036				

=== 2005 ===
2005 results in the Tokai PR block
Party	Votes	Swing	%	Seats	+/–
Liberal Democratic Party (LDP)	3,066,048	38.56	▲3.98	9	▲1
Democratic Party of Japan (DPJ)	2,766,443	34.80	▼5.97	8	▼1
Komeito	987,290	12.42	▼1.81	3	0
Japanese Communist Party (JCP)	502,501	6.32	▼0.41	1	0
New Party Nippon (Nippon)	327,768	4.12	New	0	New
Social Democratic Party (SDP)	300,574	3.78	▲0.09	0	0
Total	7,950,624	100.00		21	
Invalid votes	194,048	2.38			
Turnout	8,144,672	68.46	▲6.70		
Registered voters	11,896,841				

=== 2003 ===
2003 results in the Tokai PR block
Party	Votes	Swing	%	Seats	+/–
Democratic Party of Japan (DPJ)	2,872,501	40.77	▲10.14	9	▲2
Liberal Democratic Party (LDP)	2,436,791	34.58	▲5.95	8	▲1
Komeito	1,002,576	14.23	▲2.58	3	▲1
Japanese Communist Party (JCP)	474,414	6.73	▼3.23	1	▼1
Social Democratic Party (SDP)	259,831	3.69	▼3.70	0	▼1
Total	7,046,113	100.00		21	
Invalid votes	229,448	3.15			
Turnout	7,275,561	61.76	▼2.08		
Registered voters	11,779,595				

=== 2000 ===
2000 results in the Tokai PR block
Party	Votes	Swing	%	Seats	+/–
Democratic Party of Japan (DPJ)	2,151,270	30.63	▲15.65	7	▲4
Liberal Democratic Party (LDP)	2,011,334	28.63	▼3.39	7	▼1
Komeito	818,473	11.65	New	2	New
Japanese Communist Party (JCP)	699,970	9.96	▼1.89	2	▼1
Liberal Party (LP)	683,153	9.73	New	2	New
Social Democratic Party (SDP)	519,193	7.39	▲1.46	1	0
New Conservative Party (NCP)	92,278	1.31	New	0	New
Liberal League (LL)	48,772	0.69	New	0	New
Total	7,024,443	100.00		21	▼2
Invalid votes	355,183	4.81			
Turnout	7,379,626	63.85			
Registered voters	11,558,584				

=== 1996 ===
1996 results in the Tokai PR block
Party	Votes	%	Seats
New Frontier Party (NFP)	2,107,536	33.04	8
Liberal Democratic Party (LDP)	2,042,948	32.03	8
Democratic Party (DP)	955,464	14.98	3
Japanese Communist Party (JCP)	756,037	11.85	3
Social Democratic Party (SDP)	378,414	5.93	1
New Socialist Party (NSP)	79,449	1.25	0
Liberal League (LL)	58,965	0.92	0
Total	6,378,813	100.00	23
