= List of members of the House of Representatives of Japan, 2012–2014 =

45th House of Representatives	(2009)
46th House of Representatives	(2012)
47th House of Representatives	(2014)

This is a list of Representatives elected to the House of Representatives at the 2012 general election, held on 16 December 2012, for the Forty-Sixth election period of the House of Representatives beginning with the 182nd session of the National Diet of Japan.

== Composition ==
Party	Seats
Liberal Democratic Party	294
Japan Restoration Party	54
Democratic Party of Japan	57
New Komeito Party	31
Your Party	18
Japanese Communist Party	8
Tomorrow Party of Japan	9
Social Democratic Party	2
New Party Daichi	1
People's New Party	1
Independents	5
Total	480
Source: MIAC

=== Changes since the opening session ===
- 182nd Diet
  - December 2012
    - Bunmei Ibuki, LDP group→independent (elected President)
    - Hirotaka Akamatsu, DPJ group→independent (elected Vice President)
    - Seven TPJ group members form PLP
    - Tomoko Abe, TPJ group→independent (remains TPJ member)
    - Shizuka Kamei, TPJ group→independent (joins Green Wind)
    - Kunio Hatoyama, independent→LDP
- 183rd Diet
  - May 2013
    - Shingo Nishimura, JRP→independent (expelled)
    - Tomohiro Ishikawa (party: New Party Daichi, group: independent) resigns
  - June 2013
    - Takako Suzuki (party: New Party Daichi, group: independent) joins as Hokkaidō proportional replacement for Tomohiro Ishikawa

== List of representatives elected in the general election ==
Note: Affiliation among representatives elected may change at any given time.

Table of contents:

Hokkaidō · Tōhoku · Northern Kantō · Southern Kantō · Tōkyō · Hokuriku-Shin'etsu · Tōkai · Kinki · Chūgoku · Shikoku · Kyūshū

Constituency	Elected member	Elected party	Notes
=== Hokkaidō === (12 single-member & 8 proportional representation seats)
Hokkaidō–1st	Toshimitsu Funahashi	Liberal Democratic (LDP)	
Hokkaidō–2nd	Takamori Yoshikawa	Liberal Democratic (LDP)	
Hokkaidō–3rd	Hirohisa Takagi	Liberal Democratic (LDP)	
Hokkaidō–4th	Hiroyuki Nakamura	Liberal Democratic (LDP)	
Hokkaidō–5th	Nobutaka Machimura	Liberal Democratic (LDP)	Seat held
Hokkaidō–6th	Hiroshi Imazu	Liberal Democratic (LDP)	
Hokkaidō–7th	Yoshitaka Itō	Liberal Democratic (LDP)	Seat held
Hokkaidō–8th	Kazuo Maeda	Liberal Democratic (LDP)	
Hokkaidō–9th	Manabu Horii	Liberal Democratic (LDP)	Incumbent Rep. Yukio Hatoyama stood down
Hokkaidō–10th	Hisashi Inatsu	New Kōmeitō (NKP)	
Hokkaidō–11th	Yūko Nakagawa	Liberal Democratic (LDP)	
Hokkaidō–12th	Arata Takebe	Liberal Democratic (LDP)	
Hokkaidō block	Kōichi Watanabe	Liberal Democratic (LDP)	
Hokkaidō block	Takahiro Yokomichi	Democratic (DPJ)	
Hokkaidō block	Tomohiro Ishikawa	New Party Daichi (NPD)	
Hokkaidō block	Seiichi Shimizu	Liberal Democratic (LDP)	
Hokkaidō block	Miho Takahashi	Restoration (JRP)	
Hokkaidō block	Hidemichi Satō	New Kōmeitō (NKP)	
Hokkaidō block	Satoshi Arai	Democratic (DPJ)	
Hokkaidō block	Shigeaki Katsunuma	Liberal Democratic (LDP)	
=== Tōhoku === (25 single-member & 14 proportional representation seats)
Aomori–1st	Jun Tsushima	Liberal Democratic (LDP)	
Aomori–2nd	Akinori Eto	Liberal Democratic (LDP)	Seat held
Aomori–3rd	Tadamori Ōshima	Liberal Democratic (LDP)	Seat held
Aomori–4th	Tarō Kimura	Liberal Democratic (LDP)	Seat held
Iwate–1st	Takeshi Shina	Democratic (DPJ)	Seat held
Iwate–2nd	Shun'ichi Suzuki	Liberal Democratic (LDP)	
Iwate–3rd	Tōru Kikawada	Democratic (DPJ)	
Iwate–4th	Ichirō Ozawa	Tomorrow (TPJ)	Seat held
Miyagi–1st	Tōru Doi	Liberal Democratic (LDP)	
Miyagi–2nd	Ken'ya Akiba	Liberal Democratic (LDP)	
Miyagi–3rd	Akihiro Nishimura	Liberal Democratic (LDP)	
Miyagi–4th	Shintarō Itō	Liberal Democratic (LDP)	
Miyagi–5th	Jun Azumi	Democratic (DPJ)	Seat held
Miyagi–6th	Itsunori Onodera	Liberal Democratic (LDP)	Seat held
Akita–1st	Hiroyuki Togashi	Liberal Democratic (LDP)	
Akita–2nd	Katsutoshi Kaneda	Liberal Democratic (LDP)	
Akita–3rd	Nobuhide Minorikawa	Liberal Democratic (LDP)	
Yamagata–1st	Toshiaki Endō	Liberal Democratic (LDP)	
Yamagata–2nd	Norikazu Suzuki	Liberal Democratic (LDP)	
Yamagata–3rd	Juichi Abe	Independent	
Fukushima–1st	Yoshitami Kameoka	Liberal Democratic (LDP)	
Fukushima–2nd	Takumi Nemoto	Liberal Democratic (LDP)	
Fukushima–3rd	Kōichirō Genba	Democratic (DPJ)	Seat held
Fukushima–4th	Ichirō Kanke	Liberal Democratic (LDP)	Incumbent Rep. Kōzō Watanabe stood down
Fukushima–5th	Gōji Sakamoto	Liberal Democratic (LDP)	
Tōhoku block	Hinako Takahashi	Liberal Democratic (LDP)	
Tōhoku block	Izumi Yoshida	Democratic (DPJ)	
Tōhoku block	Shinji Oguma	Restoration (JRP)	
Tōhoku block	Takashi Fujiwara	Liberal Democratic (LDP)	
Tōhoku block	Hidenori Hashimoto	Liberal Democratic (LDP)	
Tōhoku block	Yōsuke Kondō	Democratic (DPJ)	
Tōhoku block	Yoshihisa Inoue	New Kōmeitō (NKP)	
Tōhoku block	Kōji Hata	Tomorrow (TPJ)	
Tōhoku block	Toshihide Muraoka	Restoration (JRP)	
Tōhoku block	Miyo Ōkubo	Liberal Democratic (LDP)	
Tōhoku block	Hiroki Hayashi	Your (YP)	
Tōhoku block	Kazuko Kōri	Democratic (DPJ)	
Tōhoku block	Chizuko Takahashi	Communist (JCP)	
Tōhoku block	Sachiko Kanno	Liberal Democratic (LDP)	
=== Northern Kantō === (32 single-member & 20 proportional representation seats)
Ibaraki–1st	Yoshinori Tadokoro	Liberal Democratic (LDP)	
Ibaraki–2nd	Fukushirō Nukaga	Liberal Democratic (LDP)	
Ibaraki–3rd	Yasuhiro Hanashi	Liberal Democratic (LDP)	
Ibaraki–4th	Hiroshi Kajiyama	Liberal Democratic (LDP)	Seat held
Ibaraki–5th	Akihiro Ōhata	Democratic (DPJ)	Seat held
Ibaraki–6th	Yūya Niwa	Liberal Democratic (LDP)	
Ibaraki–7th	Kishirō Nakamura	Independent	Seat held
Tochigi–1st	Hajime Funada	Liberal Democratic (LDP)	
Tochigi–2nd	Kōya Nishikawa	Liberal Democratic (LDP)	
Tochigi–3rd	Yoshimi Watanabe	Your (YP)	Seat held
Tochigi–4th	Tsutomu Satō	Liberal Democratic (LDP)	
Tochigi–5th	Toshimitsu Motegi	Liberal Democratic (LDP)	Seat held
Gunma–1st	Gen'ichirō Sata	Liberal Democratic (LDP)	
Gunma–2nd	Toshirō Ino	Liberal Democratic (LDP)	
Gunma–3rd	Hiroyoshi Sasagawa	Liberal Democratic (LDP)	
Gunma–4th	Tatsuo Fukuda	Liberal Democratic (LDP)	Incumbent Rep. Yasuo Fukuda stood down
Gunma–5th	Yūko Obuchi	Liberal Democratic (LDP)	Seat held
Saitama–1st	Hideki Murai	Liberal Democratic (LDP)	
Saitama–2nd	Yoshitaka Shindō	Liberal Democratic (LDP)	
Saitama–3rd	Hitoshi Kikawada	Liberal Democratic (LDP)	
Saitama–4th	Mayuko Toyota	Liberal Democratic (LDP)	
Saitama–5th	Yukio Edano	Democratic (DPJ)	Seat held
Saitama–6th	Kazuyuki Nakane	Liberal Democratic (LDP)	
Saitama–7th	Saichi Kamiyama	Liberal Democratic (LDP)	
Saitama–8th	Masahiko Shibayama	Liberal Democratic (LDP)	
Saitama–9th	Taku Ōtsuka	Liberal Democratic (LDP)	
Saitama–10th	Taimei Yamaguchi	Liberal Democratic (LDP)	
Saitama–11th	Ryuji Koizumi	Independent	Seat held
Saitama–12th	Atsushi Nonaka	Liberal Democratic (LDP)	
Saitama–13th	Shinako Tsuchiya	Liberal Democratic (LDP)	
Saitama–14th	Hiromi Mitsubayashi	Liberal Democratic (LDP)	
Saitama–15th	Ryōsei Tanaka	Liberal Democratic (LDP)	
Northern Kantō block	Hideki Makihara	Liberal Democratic (LDP)	
Northern Kantō block	Hiroshi Ueno	Restoration (JRP)	
Northern Kantō block	Atsushi Ōshima	Democratic (DPJ)	
Northern Kantō block	Akimasa Ishikawa	Liberal Democratic (LDP)	
Northern Kantō block	Keiichi Ishii	New Kōmeitō (NKP)	
Northern Kantō block	Kōichi Yamauchi	Your (YP)	
Northern Kantō block	Keiko Nagaoka	Liberal Democratic (LDP)	
Northern Kantō block	Takashi Ishizeki	Restoration (JRP)	
Northern Kantō block	Akio Fukuda	Democratic (DPJ)	
Northern Kantō block	Kazuo Yana	Liberal Democratic (LDP)	
Northern Kantō block	Mitsunari Okamoto	New Kōmeitō (NKP)	
Northern Kantō block	Yūji Kashiwakura	Your (YP)	
Northern Kantō block	Yoshihiro Suzuki	Restoration (JRP)	
Northern Kantō block	Yasuko Komiyama	Tomorrow (TPJ)	
Northern Kantō block	Tetsuya Shiokawa	Communist (JCP)	
Northern Kantō block	Tomohiro Konno	Liberal Democratic (LDP)	
Northern Kantō block	Kōichi Takemasa	Democratic (DPJ)	
Northern Kantō block	Masayoshi Shintani	Liberal Democratic (LDP)	
Northern Kantō block	Yūnosuke Sakamoto	Restoration (JRP)	
Northern Kantō block	Keiichi Koshimizu	New Kōmeitō (NKP)	
=== Southern Kantō === (34 single-member & 22 proportional representation seats)
Chiba–1st	Kaname Tajima	Democratic (DPJ)	Seat held
Chiba–2nd	Takayuki Kobayashi	Liberal Democratic (LDP)	
Chiba–3rd	Hirokazu Matsuno	Liberal Democratic (LDP)	
Chiba–4th	Yoshihiko Noda	Democratic (DPJ)	Seat held
Chiba–5th	Kentarō Sonoura	Liberal Democratic (LDP)	
Chiba–6th	Hiromichi Watanabe	Liberal Democratic (LDP)	
Chiba–7th	Ken Saitō	Liberal Democratic (LDP)	
Chiba–8th	Yoshitaka Sakurada	Liberal Democratic (LDP)	
Chiba–9th	Masatoshi Akimoto	Liberal Democratic (LDP)	
Chiba–10th	Motoo Hayashi	Liberal Democratic (LDP)	
Chiba–11th	Eisuke Mori	Liberal Democratic (LDP)	Seat held
Chiba–12th	Yasukazu Hamada	Liberal Democratic (LDP)	Seat held
Chiba–13th	Takaki Shirasuka	Liberal Democratic (LDP)	
Kanagawa–1st	Jun Matsumoto	Liberal Democratic (LDP)	
Kanagawa–2nd	Yoshihide Suga	Liberal Democratic (LDP)	Seat held
Kanagawa–3rd	Hachirō Okonogi	Liberal Democratic (LDP)	
Kanagawa–4th	Keiichirō Asao	Your (YP)	Incumbent Rep. Kazuyoshi Nagashima stood down
Kanagawa–5th	Manabu Sakai	Liberal Democratic (LDP)	
Kanagawa–6th	Isamu Ueda	New Kōmeitō (NKP)	
Kanagawa–7th	Keisuke Suzuki	Liberal Democratic (LDP)	
Kanagawa–8th	Kenji Eda	Your (YP)	Seat held
Kanagawa–9th	Hirofumi Ryū	Democratic (DPJ)	Seat held
Kanagawa–10th	Kazunori Tanaka	Liberal Democratic (LDP)	
Kanagawa–11th	Shinjirō Koizumi	Liberal Democratic (LDP)	Seat held
Kanagawa–12th	Tsuyoshi Hoshino	Liberal Democratic (LDP)	
Kanagawa–13th	Akira Amari	Liberal Democratic (LDP)	
Kanagawa–14th	Jirō Akama	Liberal Democratic (LDP)	
Kanagawa–15th	Tarō Kōno	Liberal Democratic (LDP)	Seat held
Kanagawa–16th	Hiroyuki Yoshiie	Liberal Democratic (LDP)	
Kanagawa–17th	Karen Makishima	Liberal Democratic (LDP)	
Kanagawa–18th	Daishirō Yamagiwa	Liberal Democratic (LDP)	
Yamanashi–1st	Noriko Miyagawa	Liberal Democratic (LDP)	
Yamanashi–2nd	Kotaro Nagasaki	Independent	
Yamanashi–3rd	Hitoshi Gotō	Democratic (DPJ)	Seat held
Southern Kantō block	Shin'ichi Nakatani	Liberal Democratic (LDP)	
Southern Kantō block	Sakihito Ozawa	Restoration (JRP)	
Southern Kantō block	Yūichi Gotō	Democratic (DPJ)	
Southern Kantō block	Hiroaki Kadoyama	Liberal Democratic (LDP)	
Southern Kantō block	Yōichirō Aoyagi	Your (YP)	
Southern Kantō block	Shigeyuki Tomita	New Kōmeitō (NKP)	
Southern Kantō block	Manabu Matsuda	Restoration (JRP)	
Southern Kantō block	Noriko Horiuchi	Liberal Democratic (LDP)	
Southern Kantō block	Sōichirō Okuno	Democratic (DPJ)	
Southern Kantō block	Norihiro Nakayama	Liberal Democratic (LDP)	
Southern Kantō block	Takashi Tanuma	Restoration (JRP)	
Southern Kantō block	Tomoko Abe	Tomorrow (TPJ)	
Southern Kantō block	Katsuhito Nakajima	Your (YP)	
Southern Kantō block	Kazuo Shii	Communist (JCP)	
Southern Kantō block	Yasuhiko Wakai	Democratic (DPJ)	
Southern Kantō block	Noriko Furuya	New Kōmeitō (NKP)	
Southern Kantō block	Tomohiro Yamamoto	Liberal Democratic (LDP)	
Southern Kantō block	Yuzuru Nishida	Restoration (JRP)	
Southern Kantō block	Mineyuki Fukuda	Liberal Democratic (LDP)	
Southern Kantō block	Yukio Ubukata	Democratic (DPJ)	
Southern Kantō block	Tsuyoshi Shiina	Your (YP)	
Southern Kantō block	Tamotsu Shiiki	Restoration (JRP)	
=== Tōkyō === (27 single-member & 17 proportional representation seats)
Tōkyō–1st	Miki Yamada	Liberal Democratic (LDP)	
Tōkyō–2nd	Kiyoto Tsuji	Liberal Democratic (LDP)	
Tōkyō–3rd	Hirotaka Ishihara	Liberal Democratic (LDP)	
Tōkyō–4th	Masaaki Taira	Liberal Democratic (LDP)	
Tōkyō–5th	Kenji Wakamiya	Liberal Democratic (LDP)	
Tōkyō–6th	Takao Ochi	Liberal Democratic (LDP)	
Tōkyō–7th	Akira Nagatsuma	Democratic (DPJ)	Seat held
Tōkyō–8th	Nobuteru Ishihara	Liberal Democratic (LDP)	Seat held
Tōkyō–9th	Isshū Sugawara	Liberal Democratic (LDP)	
Tōkyō–10th	Yuriko Koike	Liberal Democratic (LDP)	
Tōkyō–11th	Hakubun Shimomura	Liberal Democratic (LDP)	Seat held
Tōkyō–12th	Akihiro Ōta	New Kōmeitō (NKP)	
Tōkyō–13th	Ichirō Kamoshita	Liberal Democratic (LDP)	Incumbent Rep. Tairō Hirayama stood down
Tōkyō–14th	Midori Matsushima	Liberal Democratic (LDP)	
Tōkyō–15th	Mito Kakizawa	Your (YP)	
Tōkyō–16th	Hideo Ōnishi	Liberal Democratic (LDP)	
Tōkyō–17th	Katsuei Hirasawa	Liberal Democratic (LDP)	Seat held
Tōkyō–18th	Masatada Tsuchiya	Liberal Democratic (LDP)	
Tōkyō–19th	Yōhei Matsumoto	Liberal Democratic (LDP)	
Tōkyō–20th	Seiji Kihara	Liberal Democratic (LDP)	
Tōkyō–21st	Akihisa Nagashima	Democratic (DPJ)	Seat held
Tōkyō–22nd	Tatsuya Itō	Liberal Democratic (LDP)	
Tōkyō–23rd	Masanobu Ogura	Liberal Democratic (LDP)	
Tōkyō–24th	Kōichi Hagiuda	Liberal Democratic (LDP)	
Tōkyō–25th	Shinji Inoue	Liberal Democratic (LDP)	Seat held
Tōkyō block	Kiyoshi Odawara	Liberal Democratic (LDP)	
Tōkyō block	Shintarō Ishihara	Restoration (JRP)	
Tōkyō block	Banri Kaieda	Democratic (DPJ)	
Tōkyō block	Tsukasa Akimoto	Liberal Democratic (LDP)	
Tōkyō block	Toshiaki Ōkuma	Your (YP)	
Tōkyō block	Yōsuke Takagi	New Kōmeitō (NKP)	
Tōkyō block	Hirofumi Imamura	Restoration (JRP)	
Tōkyō block	Fumiaki Matsumoto	Liberal Democratic (LDP)	
Tōkyō block	Jin Matsubara	Democratic (DPJ)	
Tōkyō block	Akira Kasai	Communist (JCP)	
Tōkyō block	Ai Aoki	Tomorrow (TPJ)	
Tōkyō block	Hiroshi Yamada	Restoration (JRP)	
Tōkyō block	Tsuneo Akaeda	Liberal Democratic (LDP)	
Tōkyō block	Hidehiro Mitani	Your (YP)	
Tōkyō block	Naoto Kan	Democratic (DPJ)	
Tōkyō block	Michiyo Takagi	New Kōmeitō (NKP)	
Tōkyō block	Tsuyoshi Tabata	Liberal Democratic (LDP)	
=== Hokuriku-Shin'etsu === (20 single-member & 11 proportional representation seats)
Niigata–1st	Tōru Ishizaki	Liberal Democratic (LDP)	
Niigata–2nd	Kenichi Hosoda	Liberal Democratic (LDP)	
Niigata–3rd	Hiroaki Saitō	Liberal Democratic (LDP)	
Niigata–4th	Megumi Kaneko	Liberal Democratic (LDP)	
Niigata–5th	Tadayoshi Nagashima	Liberal Democratic (LDP)	
Niigata–6th	Shuichi Takatori	Liberal Democratic (LDP)	
Toyama–1st	Hiroaki Tabata	Liberal Democratic (LDP)	
Toyama–2nd	Mitsuhiro Miyakoshi	Liberal Democratic (LDP)	Seat held
Toyama–3rd	Keiichiro Tachibana	Liberal Democratic (LDP)	Seat held
Ishikawa–1st	Hiroshi Hase	Liberal Democratic (LDP)	
Ishikawa–2nd	Hajime Sasaki	Liberal Democratic (LDP)	Incumbent Rep. Yoshirō Mori stood down
Ishikawa–3rd	Shigeo Kitamura	Liberal Democratic (LDP)	
Fukui–1st	Tomomi Inada	Liberal Democratic (LDP)	Seat held
Fukui–2nd	Taku Yamamoto	Liberal Democratic (LDP)	Seat held
Fukui–3rd	Tsuyoshi Takagi	Liberal Democratic (LDP)	Seat held
Nagano–1st	Takashi Shinohara	Democratic (DPJ)	Seat held
Nagano–2nd	Shunsuke Mutai	Liberal Democratic (LDP)	
Nagano–3rd	Yoshiyuki Terashima	Democratic (DPJ)	Incumbent Rep. Tsutomu Hata stood down
Nagano–4th	Shigeyuki Gotō	Liberal Democratic (LDP)	
Nagano–5th	Ichirō Miyashita	Liberal Democratic (LDP)	
Hokuriku-Shin'etsu block	Hitoshi Kiuchi	Liberal Democratic (LDP)	
Hokuriku-Shin'etsu block	Hiroshi Nakada	Restoration (JRP)	
Hokuriku-Shin'etsu block	Eiichiro Washio	Democratic (DPJ)	
Hokuriku-Shin'etsu block	Yutaka Komatsu	Liberal Democratic (LDP)	
Hokuriku-Shin'etsu block	Fumio Nagayama	Liberal Democratic (LDP)	
Hokuriku-Shin'etsu block	Takahito Miyazawa	Restoration (JRP)	
Hokuriku-Shin'etsu block	Makiko Kikuta	Democratic (DPJ)	
Hokuriku-Shin'etsu block	Yoshio Urushibara	New Kōmeitō (NKP)	
Hokuriku-Shin'etsu block	Shigeyoshi Sukeda	Liberal Democratic (LDP)	
Hokuriku-Shin'etsu block	Yōsei Ide	Your (YP)	
Hokuriku-Shin'etsu block	Tomoyuki Momose	Restoration (JRP)	
=== Tōkai === (33 single-member & 21 proportional representation seats)
Gifu–1st	Seiko Noda	Liberal Democratic (LDP)	
Gifu–2nd	Yasufumi Tanahashi	Liberal Democratic (LDP)	Seat held
Gifu–3rd	Yōji Mutō	Liberal Democratic (LDP)	
Gifu–4th	Kazuyoshi Kaneko	Liberal Democratic (LDP)	Seat held
Gifu–5th	Keiji Furuya	Liberal Democratic (LDP)	
Shizuoka–1st	Yōko Kamikawa	Liberal Democratic (LDP)	
Shizuoka–2nd	Tatsunori Ibayashi	Liberal Democratic (LDP)	
Shizuoka–3rd	Hiroyuki Miyazawa	Liberal Democratic (LDP)	
Shizuoka–4th	Yoshio Mochizuki	Liberal Democratic (LDP)	
Shizuoka–5th	Gōshi Hosono	Democratic (DPJ)	Seat held
Shizuoka–6th	Shū Watanabe	Democratic (DPJ)	Seat held
Shizuoka–7th	Minoru Kiuchi	Liberal Democratic (LDP)	Seat held
Shizuoka–8th	Ryū Shionoya	Liberal Democratic (LDP)	
Aichi–1st	Hiromichi Kumada	Liberal Democratic (LDP)	
Aichi–2nd	Motohisa Furukawa	Democratic (DPJ)	Seat held
Aichi–3rd	Yoshitaka Ikeda	Liberal Democratic (LDP)	
Aichi–4th	Shōzō Kudō	Liberal Democratic (LDP)	
Aichi–5th	Kenji Kanda	Liberal Democratic (LDP)	
Aichi–6th	Hideki Niwa	Liberal Democratic (LDP)	Seat held
Aichi–7th	Junji Suzuki	Liberal Democratic (LDP)	
Aichi–8th	Tadahiko Itō	Liberal Democratic (LDP)	
Aichi–9th	Yasumasa Nagasaka	Liberal Democratic (LDP)	
Aichi–10th	Tetsuma Esaki	Liberal Democratic (LDP)	
Aichi–11th	Shin'ichirō Furumoto	Democratic (DPJ)	Seat held
Aichi–12th	Shūhei Aoyama	Liberal Democratic (LDP)	
Aichi–13th	Sei Ōmi	Liberal Democratic (LDP)	
Aichi–14th	Sōichirō Imaeda	Liberal Democratic (LDP)	
Aichi–15th	Yukinori Nemoto	Liberal Democratic (LDP)	
Mie–1st	Jirō Kawasaki	Liberal Democratic (LDP)	Incumbent Rep. Hiroshi Nakai stood down
Mie–2nd	Masaharu Nakagawa	Democratic (DPJ)	Seat held
Mie–3rd	Katsuya Okada	Democratic (DPJ)	Seat held
Mie–4th	Norihisa Tamura	Liberal Democratic (LDP)	
Mie–5th	Norio Mitsuya	Liberal Democratic (LDP)	Seat held
Tōkai block	Takaaki Katsumata	Liberal Democratic (LDP)	
Tōkai block	Takao Fujii	Restoration (JRP)	
Tōkai block	Kensuke Ōnishi	Democratic (DPJ)	
Tōkai block	Tetsuya Yagi	Liberal Democratic (LDP)	
Tōkai block	Yoshinori Oguchi	New Kōmeitō (NKP)	
Tōkai block	Masato Imai	Restoration (JRP)	
Tōkai block	Hirotaka Akamatsu	Democratic (DPJ)	
Tōkai block	Tetsuya Tōgō	Liberal Democratic (LDP)	
Tōkai block	Kazumi Sugimoto	Your (YP)	
Tōkai block	Katsumasa Suzuki	Tomorrow (TPJ)	
Tōkai block	Yoshikazu Shimada	Liberal Democratic (LDP)	
Tōkai block	Kazuhiko Shigetoku	Restoration (JRP)	
Tōkai block	Shōichi Kondō	Democratic (DPJ)	
Tōkai block	Takeru Yoshikawa	Liberal Democratic (LDP)	
Tōkai block	Wataru Ito	New Kōmeitō (NKP)	
Tōkai block	Kensho Sasaki	Communist (JCP)	
Tōkai block	Nozomu Suzuki	Restoration (JRP)	
Tōkai block	Yasuhiro Nakane	Democratic (DPJ)	
Tōkai block	Hiroshi Sakurai	Liberal Democratic (LDP)	
Tōkai block	Masanari Koike	Your (YP)	
Tōkai block	Takashi Kawata	Liberal Democratic (LDP)	
=== Kinki === (48 single-member & 29 proportional representation seats)
Shiga–1st	Toshitaka Ōoka	Liberal Democratic (LDP)	
Shiga–2nd	Ken'ichirō Ueno	Liberal Democratic (LDP)	
Shiga–3rd	Nobuhide Takemura	Liberal Democratic (LDP)	
Shiga–4th	Takaya Mutō	Liberal Democratic (LDP)	
Kyōto–1st	Bunmei Ibuki	Liberal Democratic (LDP)	
Kyōto–2nd	Seiji Maehara	Democratic (DPJ)	Seat held
Kyōto–3rd	Kensuke Miyazaki	Liberal Democratic (LDP)	
Kyōto–4th	Hideyuki Tanaka	Liberal Democratic (LDP)	
Kyōto–5th	Sadakazu Tanigaki	Liberal Democratic (LDP)	Seat held
Kyōto–6th	Kazunori Yamanoi	Democratic (DPJ)	Seat held
Ōsaka–1st	Hidetaka Inoue	Restoration (JRP)	
Ōsaka–2nd	Akira Satō	Tomorrow (TPJ)	
Ōsaka–3rd	Shigeki Satō	New Kōmeitō (NKP)	Incumbent Rep. Masazumi Nakajima stood down
Ōsaka–4th	Masatoshi Murakami	Restoration (JRP)	
Ōsaka–5th	Tōru Kunishige	New Kōmeitō (NKP)	Incumbent Rep. Tetsuo Inami stood down
Ōsaka–6th	Shin'ichi Isa	New Kōmeitō (NKP)	
Ōsaka–7th	Naomi Tokashiki	Liberal Democratic (LDP)	
Ōsaka–8th	Tomohiko Kinoshita	Restoration (JRP)	Incumbent Rep. Kansei Nakano stood down
Ōsaka–9th	Yasushi Adachi	Restoration (JRP)	
Ōsaka–10th	Kenta Matsunami	Restoration (JRP)	
Ōsaka–11th	Nobuhisa Itō	Restoration (JRP)	
Ōsaka–12th	Tomokatsu Kitagawa	Liberal Democratic (LDP)	
Ōsaka–13th	Kōichi Nishino	Restoration (JRP)	Incumbent Rep. Akira Nishino stood down
Ōsaka–14th	Takashi Tanihata	Restoration (JRP)	
Ōsaka–15th	Yasuto Urano	Restoration (JRP)	
Ōsaka–16th	Kazuo Kitagawa	New Kōmeitō (NKP)	
Ōsaka–17th	Nobuyuki Baba	Restoration (JRP)	
Ōsaka–18th	Takashi Endō	Restoration (JRP)	
Ōsaka–19th	Hodaka Maruyama	Restoration (JRP)	
Hyōgo–1st	Masahito Moriyama	Liberal Democratic (LDP)	
Hyōgo–2nd	Kazuyoshi Akaba	New Kōmeitō (NKP)	
Hyōgo–3rd	Yoshihiro Seki	Liberal Democratic (LDP)	Incumbent Rep. Ryuichi Doi stood down
Hyōgo–4th	Hisayuki Fujii	Liberal Democratic (LDP)	
Hyōgo–5th	Kōichi Tani	Liberal Democratic (LDP)	
Hyōgo–6th	Masaki Ōgushi	Liberal Democratic (LDP)	
Hyōgo–7th	Kenji Yamada	Liberal Democratic (LDP)	
Hyōgo–8th	Hiromasa Nakano	New Kōmeitō (NKP)	
Hyōgo–9th	Yasutoshi Nishimura	Liberal Democratic (LDP)	Seat held
Hyōgo–10th	Kisaburō Tokai	Liberal Democratic (LDP)	
Hyōgo–11th	Takeaki Matsumoto	Democratic (DPJ)	Seat held
Hyōgo–12th	Tsuyoshi Yamaguchi	Democratic (DPJ)	Seat held
Nara–1st	Sumio Mabuchi	Democratic (DPJ)	Seat held
Nara–2nd	Sanae Takaichi	Liberal Democratic (LDP)	Incumbent Rep. Makoto Taki stood down
Nara–3rd	Shinsuke Okuno	Liberal Democratic (LDP)	
Nara–4th	Ryōtarō Tanose	Liberal Democratic (LDP)	Incumbent Rep. Ryōtarō Tanose stood down
Wakayama–1st	Shūhei Kishimoto	Democratic (DPJ)	Seat held
Wakayama–2nd	Masatoshi Ishida	Liberal Democratic (LDP)	
Wakayama–3rd	Toshihiro Nikai	Liberal Democratic (LDP)	Seat held
Kinki block	Hideo Higashikokubaru	Restoration (JRP)	
Kinki block	Hirofumi Kado	Liberal Democratic (LDP)	
Kinki block	Shingo Nishimura	Restoration (JRP)	
Kinki block	Yuzuru Takeuchi	New Kōmeitō (NKP)	
Kinki block	Kenta Izumi	Democratic (DPJ)	
Kinki block	Naokazu Takemoto	Liberal Democratic (LDP)	
Kinki block	Naoto Sakaguchi	Restoration (JRP)	
Kinki block	Yasuhide Nakayama	Liberal Democratic (LDP)	
Kinki block	Kee Miki	Restoration (JRP)	
Kinki block	Keiji Kokuta	Communist (JCP)	
Kinki block	Nobuhiko Isaka	Your (YP)	
Kinki block	Tomoko Ukishima	New Kōmeitō (NKP)	
Kinki block	Hiroshi Miyake	Restoration (JRP)	
Kinki block	Taizō Mikazuki	Democratic (DPJ)	
Kinki block	Taku Otsuka	Liberal Democratic (LDP)	
Kinki block	Sayuri Uenishi	Restoration (JRP)	
Kinki block	Fumiyoshi Murakami	Tomorrow (TPJ)	
Kinki block	Hiroshi Ando	Liberal Democratic (LDP)	
Kinki block	Yuka Hayashibara	Restoration (JRP)	
Kinki block	Naoya Higuchi	New Kōmeitō (NKP)	
Kinki block	Kiyomi Tsujimoto	Democratic (DPJ)	
Kinki block	Shigeki Kobayashi	Liberal Democratic (LDP)	
Kinki block	Hiroki Iwanaga	Restoration (JRP)	
Kinki block	Takeshi Miyamoto	Communist (JCP)	
Kinki block	Hideto Shinbara	Restoration (JRP)	
Kinki block	Kenji Harada	Liberal Democratic (LDP)	
Kinki block	Mitsunari Hatanaka	Your (YP)	
Kinki block	Susumu Hamamura	New Kōmeitō (NKP)	
Kinki block	Mio Sugita	Restoration (JRP)	
=== Chūgoku === (20 single-member & 11 proportional representation seats)
Tottori–1st	Shigeru Ishiba	Liberal Democratic (LDP)	Seat held
Tottori–2nd	Ryōsei Akazawa	Liberal Democratic (LDP)	Seat held
Shimane–1st	Hiroyuki Hosoda	Liberal Democratic (LDP)	Seat held
Shimane–2nd	Wataru Takeshita	Liberal Democratic (LDP)	Seat held
Okayama–1st	Ichirō Aisawa	Liberal Democratic (LDP)	Seat held
Okayama–2nd	Takashi Yamashita	Liberal Democratic (LDP)	
Okayama–3rd	Takeo Hiranuma	Restoration (JRP)	Seat held
Okayama–4th	Gaku Hashimoto	Liberal Democratic (LDP)	
Okayama–5th	Katsunobu Katō	Liberal Democratic (LDP)	Seat held
Hiroshima–1st	Fumio Kishida	Liberal Democratic (LDP)	Seat held
Hiroshima–2nd	Hiroshi Hiraguchi	Liberal Democratic (LDP)	
Hiroshima–3rd	Katsuyuki Kawai	Liberal Democratic (LDP)	
Hiroshima–4th	Toshinao Nakagawa	Liberal Democratic (LDP)	
Hiroshima–5th	Minoru Terada	Liberal Democratic (LDP)	
Hiroshima–6th	Shizuka Kamei	Tomorrow (TPJ)	Seat held
Hiroshima–7th	Fumiaki Kobayashi	Liberal Democratic (LDP)	
Yamaguchi–1st	Masahiko Kōmura	Liberal Democratic (LDP)	Seat held
Yamaguchi–2nd	Nobuo Kishi	Liberal Democratic (LDP)	
Yamaguchi–3rd	Takeo Kawamura	Liberal Democratic (LDP)	Seat held
Yamaguchi–4th	Shinzō Abe	Liberal Democratic (LDP)	Seat held
Chūgoku block	Toshifumi Kojima	Liberal Democratic (LDP)	
Chūgoku block	Hiromu Nakamaru	Restoration (JRP)	
Chūgoku block	Toshiko Abe	Liberal Democratic (LDP)	
Chūgoku block	Michiyoshi Yunoki	Democratic (DPJ)	
Chūgoku block	Tetsuo Saitō	New Kōmeitō (NKP)	
Chūgoku block	Masayoshi Yoshino	Liberal Democratic (LDP)	
Chūgoku block	Daisuke Sakamoto	Restoration (JRP)	
Chūgoku block	Mitsuhiro Uesugi	Liberal Democratic (LDP)	
Chūgoku block	Keisuke Tsumura	Democratic (DPJ)	
Chūgoku block	Keigo Masuya	New Kōmeitō (NKP)	
Chūgoku block	Michitaka Ikeda	Liberal Democratic (LDP)	
=== Shikoku === (13 single-member & 6 proportional representation seats)
Tokushima–1st	Mamoru Fukuyama	Liberal Democratic (LDP)	
Tokushima–2nd	Shun'ichi Yamaguchi	Liberal Democratic (LDP)	
Tokushima–3rd	Masazumi Gotōda	Liberal Democratic (LDP)	Seat held
Kagawa–1st	Takuya Hirai	Liberal Democratic (LDP)	
Kagawa–2nd	Yūichirō Tamaki	Democratic (DPJ)	Seat held
Kagawa–3rd	Keitaro Ohno	Liberal Democratic (LDP)	Incumbent Rep. Yoshinori Ōno stood down
Ehime–1st	Yasuhisa Shiozaki	Liberal Democratic (LDP)	Seat held
Ehime–2nd	Seiichirō Murakami	Liberal Democratic (LDP)	Seat held
Ehime–3rd	Tōru Shiraishi	Liberal Democratic (LDP)	
Ehime–4th	Kōichi Yamamoto	Liberal Democratic (LDP)	Seat held
Kōchi–1st	Teru Fukui	Liberal Democratic (LDP)	Seat held
Kōchi–2nd	Gen Nakatani	Liberal Democratic (LDP)	Seat held
Kōchi–3rd	Yūji Yamamoto	Liberal Democratic (LDP)	Seat held
Shikoku block	Takakazu Seto	Liberal Democratic (LDP)	
Shikoku block	Fumiki Sakurauchi	Restoration (JRP)	
Shikoku block	Jun'ya Ogawa	Democratic (DPJ)	
Shikoku block	Yasuji Izuhara	Liberal Democratic (LDP)	
Shikoku block	Noritoshi Ishida	New Kōmeitō (NKP)	
Shikoku block	Arata Nishioka	Restoration (JRP)	
=== Kyūshū === (38 single-member & 21 proportional representation seats)
Fukuoka–1st	Takahiro Inoue	Liberal Democratic (LDP)	
Fukuoka–2nd	Makoto Oniki (House of Representatives)	Liberal Democratic (LDP)	
Fukuoka–3rd	Atsushi Koga	Liberal Democratic (LDP)	
Fukuoka–4th	Hideki Miyauchi	Liberal Democratic (LDP)	
Fukuoka–5th	Yoshiaki Harada	Liberal Democratic (LDP)	
Fukuoka–6th	Kunio Hatoyama	Independent	Seat held
Fukuoka–7th	Satoshi Fujimaru	Liberal Democratic (LDP)	Incumbent Rep. Makoto Koga stood down
Fukuoka–8th	Tarō Asō	Liberal Democratic (LDP)	Seat held
Fukuoka–9th	Asahiko Mihara	Liberal Democratic (LDP)	
Fukuoka–10th	Kōzō Yamamoto	Liberal Democratic (LDP)	
Fukuoka–11th	Ryōta Takeda	Liberal Democratic (LDP)	Seat held
Saga–1st	Kazuchika Iwata	Liberal Democratic (LDP)	
Saga–2nd	Masahiro Imamura	Liberal Democratic (LDP)	
Saga–3rd	Kōsuke Hori	Liberal Democratic (LDP)	Seat held
Nagasaki–1st	Tsutomu Tomioka	Liberal Democratic (LDP)	
Nagasaki–2nd	Kanji Katō	Liberal Democratic (LDP)	Incumbent Rep. Eriko Fukuda stood down
Nagasaki–3rd	Yaichi Tanigawa	Liberal Democratic (LDP)	
Nagasaki–4th	Seigo Kitamura	Liberal Democratic (LDP)	
Kumamoto–1st	Minoru Kihara	Liberal Democratic (LDP)	
Kumamoto–2nd	Takeshi Noda	Liberal Democratic (LDP)	
Kumamoto–3rd	Tetsushi Sakamoto	Liberal Democratic (LDP)	Seat held
Kumamoto–4th	Hiroyuki Sonoda	Restoration (JRP)	Seat held
Kumamoto–5th	Yasushi Kaneko	Liberal Democratic (LDP)	Seat held
Ōita–1st	Yōichi Anami	Liberal Democratic (LDP)	
Ōita–2nd	Seishirō Etō	Liberal Democratic (LDP)	Incumbent Rep. Yasumasa Shigeno stood down
Ōita–3rd	Takeshi Iwaya	Liberal Democratic (LDP)	
Miyazaki–1st	Shunsuke Takei	Liberal Democratic (LDP)	
Miyazaki–2nd	Taku Etō	Liberal Democratic (LDP)	Seat held
Miyazaki–3rd	Yoshihisa Furukawa	Liberal Democratic (LDP)	Seat held
Kagoshima–1st	Okiharu Yasuoka	Liberal Democratic (LDP)	
Kagoshima–2nd	Takeshi Tokuda	Liberal Democratic (LDP)	Seat held
Kagoshima–3rd	Takeshi Noma	People's New (PNP)	
Kagoshima–4th	Yasuhiro Ozato	Liberal Democratic (LDP)	Seat held
Kagoshima–5th	Hiroshi Moriyama	Liberal Democratic (LDP)	Seat held
Okinawa–1st	Kōnosuke Kokuba	Liberal Democratic (LDP)	
Okinawa–2nd	Kantoku Teruya	Social Democratic (SDP)	Seat held
Okinawa–3rd	Natsumi Higa	Liberal Democratic (LDP)	
Okinawa–4th	Kōsaburō Nishime	Liberal Democratic (LDP)	
Kyūshū block	Kazuaki Miyaji	Liberal Democratic (LDP)	
Kyūshū block	Yorihisa Matsuno	Restoration (JRP)	
Kyūshū block	Yasuyuki Eda	New Kōmeitō (NKP)	
Kyūshū block	Masahisa Miyazaki	Liberal Democratic (LDP)	
Kyūshū block	Hiroshi Ōgushi	Democratic (DPJ)	
Kyūshū block	Kyōko Nishikawa	Liberal Democratic (LDP)	
Kyūshū block	Masami Kawano	Restoration (JRP)	
Kyūshū block	Kiyohiko Tōyama	New Kōmeitō (NKP)	
Kyūshū block	Takeshi Hayashida	Liberal Democratic (LDP)	
Kyūshū block	Kazuhiro Haraguchi	Democratic (DPJ)	
Kyūshū block	Masao Satō	Your (YP)	
Kyūshū block	Nariaki Nakayama	Restoration (JRP)	
Kyūshū block	Yūji Shinkai	Liberal Democratic (LDP)	
Kyūshū block	Masakazu Hamachi	New Kōmeitō (NKP)	
Kyūshū block	Seiken Akamine	Communist (JCP)	
Kyūshū block	Mitsunori Sueyoshi	Liberal Democratic (LDP)	
Kyūshū block	Yoshiaki Takaki	Democratic (DPJ)	
Kyūshū block	Tsuyoshi Yamanouchi	Restoration (JRP)	
Kyūshū block	Hajime Yoshikawa	Social Democratic (SDP)	
Kyūshū block	Kazuyuki Yukawa	Liberal Democratic (LDP)	
Kyūshū block	Denny Tamaki	Tomorrow (TPJ)	

== List of representatives elected in the 2012 general election as proportional replacements ==
- Takako Suzuki (2013 Hokkaidō PR block replacement for Tomohiro Ishikawa from the NPD list)
- Kōichirō Shimizu (Kinki PR block runner-up on the JRP list, fills seat vacated by Hideo Higashikokubaru in 2013)
- Tatsuo Kawabata (Kinki PR block runner-up on the DPJ list, fills seat vacated by Taizō Mikazuki in 2014)

== Representative elected in the 2014 special election ==
- Masuo Kaneko (LDP, April 2014 special election in Kagoshima's 2nd district)

== See also ==
- Results of the Japanese general election, 2012 (lists Representatives elected by constituency)
