= Results of the 2012 Japanese general election =

- 16 December 2012
- All 480 seats in the House of Representatives; 241 seats needed for a majority
Party	Leader	Seats	+/–
LDP	Shinzō Abe	294	+175
Democratic	Yoshihiko Noda	57	−251
Restoration	Shintaro Ishihara	54	New
Komeito	Natsuo Yamaguchi	31	+10
Your	Yoshimi Watanabe	18	+13
Tomorrow	Yukiko Kada	9	New
JCP	Kazuo Shii	8	−1
Social Democratic	Mizuho Fukushima	2	−5
NP-Daichi	Muneo Suzuki	1	0
People's New	Tamisuke Watanuki	1	−2
Independents	–	5	−1
This lists parties that won seats. See the complete results below.
- Constituency seats
- All 300 seats
- Turnout: 59.32% (▼9.89pp)
Party	Vote %	Seats	+/–
LDP	43.01	237	+173
Democratic	22.81	27	−194
Restoration	11.64	14	New
Tomorrow	5.02	2	New
Your	4.71	4	+2
Komeito	1.49	9	+9
Social Democratic	0.76	1	−2
People's New	0.20	1	−2
Independents	1.69	5	−1
This lists parties that won seats. See the complete results below.
- Proportional seats
- All 180 seats
- Turnout: 59.31% (▼9.88pp)
Party	Vote %	Seats	+/–
LDP	27.62	57	+2
Restoration	20.38	40	New
Democratic	16.00	30	−57
Komeito	11.83	22	+1
Your	8.72	14	+11
JCP	6.13	8	−1
Tomorrow	5.69	7	New
Social Democratic	2.36	1	−3
NP-Daichi	0.58	1	0
This lists parties that won seats. See the complete results below.
Results by constituency and PR seats, shaded according to vote strength
Prime Minister before	Prime Minister after
Yoshihiko Noda; Democratic	Shinzo Abe; LDP

This article presents detailed results of the 2012 Japanese general election. The results are separated into each of the eleven proportional representation blocks and their corresponding prefectures. In the following tables, candidates elected via single-member district are highlighted in green, while candidates elected via proportional representation are highlighted in red.

== Electoral system ==
The House of Representatives is elected via parallel voting. In the 2012 election, 300 members were elected in single-member districts and 180 via party-list proportional representation in eleven multi-member constituencies, referred to as "PR blocks". Single-member districts are apportioned between prefectures and numbered (1st, 2nd, etc). Candidates may run solely in a single-member district, solely in PR, or both (dual listing). Dual listed candidates must win at least 10% of the vote in their single-member district in order to be eligible for election via PR. Dual listed candidates who win their single-member district race are not eligible for election via PR.

Candidates on PR lists may be ranked sequentially or, if they are dual listed, ranked equally with one another. If ranked equally, the best-loser ratio (sekihairitsu) of each candidate determines the order of election. This number is determined by dividing their single-member district votes by those of the winning candidate in that district. In this way, the losing candidates who performed best will be elected first.

If a party wins more PR seats than they have eligible candidates on their list, the unfilled seats will be distributed to other parties in accordance with the PR formula.

== Hokkaido block ==
2012 Japanese general election in Hokkaido
- 16 December 2012

All 20 seats to the House of Representatives
	Majority party	Minority party	Third party
Party	LDP	DPJ	Komeito
Last election	3 seats	15 seats	1 seat
Constituency	11	0	1
PR seats	3	2	1
Total	14	2	2
Seat change	▲11	▼13	▲1
	Fourth party	Fifth party
Party	Daichi	JRP
Last election	1 seat	New
Constituency	0	0
PR seats	1	1
Total	1	1
Seat change	0	▲1

Single-member constituency results in Hokkaido
Constituency	Previous member		Elected member		Votes	%	Margin	Runner-up	Party	%	Status
Hokkaido 1st	Takahiro Yokomichi	DPJ	Toshimitsu Funabashi	LDP	86,034	31.1	6,040	Takahiro Yokomichi	DPJ	28.9	LDP gain from DPJ
Hokkaido 2nd	Wakio Mitsui	DPJ	Takamori Yoshikawa	LDP	83,575	35.0	28,055	Wakio Mitsui	DPJ	23.2	LDP gain from DPJ
Hokkaido 3rd	Satoshi Arai	DPJ	Hirohisa Takagi	LDP	88,360	36.9	23,761	Satoshi Arai	DPJ	27.0	LDP gain from DPJ
Hokkaido 4th	Yoshio Hachiro	DPJ	Hiroyuki Nakamura	LDP	79,588	44.2	26,371	Yoshio Hachiro	DPJ	29.6	LDP gain from DPJ
Hokkaido 5th	Nobutaka Machimura	LDP	Nobutaka Machimura	LDP	128,435	48.6	59,360	Shigeyuki Nakamae	DPJ	26.1	LDP hold
Hokkaido 6th	Takahiro Sasaki	DPJ	Hiroshi Imazu	LDP	103,064	42.9	33,792	Takahiro Sasaki	DPJ	28.9	LDP gain from DPJ
Hokkaido 7th	Yoshitaka Itō	LDP	Yoshitaka Itō	LDP	72,945	47.2	21,894	Takako Suzuki	Daichi	33.1	LDP hold
Hokkaido 8th	Seiji Osaka	DPJ	Kazuo Maeda	LDP	107,937	47.5	30,535	Seiji Osaka	DPJ	34.1	LDP gain from DPJ
Hokkaido 9th	Yukio Hatoyama	DPJ	Manabu Horii	LDP	121,145	55.2	59,529	Tatsumaru Yamaoka	DPJ	28.1	LDP gain from DPJ
Hokkaido 10th	Tadamasa Kodaira	DPJ	Hisashi Inatsu	Komei	87,930	43.1	24,932	Tadamasa Kodaira	DPJ	30.9	Komei gain from DPJ
Hokkaido 11th	Tomohiro Ishikawa	Daichi	Yūko Nakagawa	LDP	86,719	51.0	16,607	Tomohiro Ishikawa	Daichi	41.2	LDP gain from Daichi
Hokkaido 12th	Kenko Matsuki	Daichi	Arata Takebe	LDP	91,208	50.3	38,232	Kenko Matsuki	Daichi	29.2	LDP gain from Daichi

Proportional representation results
Party	Votes	Seats	Rank	Elected member	Constituency	Ratio
LDP	692,304 (26.4%)	3	1	Kōichi Watanabe		
LDP	692,304 (26.4%)	3	13	Seiichi Shimizu		
LDP	692,304 (26.4%)	3	14	Shigeaki Katsunuma		
DPJ	477,356 (18.2%)	2	1	Takahiro Yokomichi	Hokkaido 1st	93.0%
DPJ	477,356 (18.2%)	2	1	Satoshi Arai	Hokkaido 3rd	73.1%
Daichi	346,848 (13.2%)	1	1	Tomohiro Ishikawa	Hokkaido 11th	80.8%
JRP	333,760 (12.7%)	1	1	Miho Takahashi	Hokkaido 2nd	56.4%
Komei	289,011 (11.0%)	1	1	Hidemichi Satō		

== Tohoku block ==
2012 Japanese general election in Tohoku
- 16 December 2012

All 39 seats to the House of Representatives
	Majority party	Minority party	Third party
Party	LDP	DPJ	JRP
Last election	9 seats	26 seats	New
Constituency	19	4	1
PR seats	5	3	1
Total	24	7	2
Seat change	▲15	▼19	▲2
	Fourth party	Fifth party	Sixth party
Party	TPJ	Komeito	Your
Last election	New	1 seat	0 seats
Constituency	1	0	0
PR seats	1	1	1
Total	2	1	1
Seat change	▲2	0	▲1
	Seventh party	Eighth party	Ninth party
Party	JCP	SDP	Ind.
Last election	1 seat	1 seat	1 seat
Constituency	0	0	1
PR seats	1	0	–
Total	1	0	1
Seat change	0	▼1	0

Single-member constituency results in Tohoku
Constituency	Previous member		Elected member		Votes	%	Margin	Runner-up	Party	%	Status
Aomori 1st	Hokuto Yokoyama	TPJ	Jun Tsushima	LDP	73,237	40.6	25,837	Sekio Masuta	JRP	26.2	LDP gain from TPJ
Aomori 2nd	Akinori Eto	LDP	Akinori Eto	LDP	81,937	65.2	63,101	Tomonobu Nakamura	DPJ	15.0	LDP hold
Aomori 3rd	Tadamori Ōshima	LDP	Tadamori Ōshima	LDP	74,946	53.7	28,762	Masayo Tanabu	DPJ	33.1	LDP hold
Aomori 4th	Tarō Kimura	LDP	Tarō Kimura	LDP	104,544	66.5	69,403	Kyoichi Tsushima	DPJ	22.3	LDP hold
Iwate 1st	Takeshi Shina	DPJ	Takeshi Shina	DPJ	55,909	34.7	11,907	Hinako Takahashi	LDP	27.3	DPJ hold
Iwate 2nd	Koji Hata	TPJ	Shun'ichi Suzuki	LDP	96,523	56.5	32,828	Koji Hata	TPJ	37.3	LDP gain from TPJ
Iwate 3rd	Toru Kikawada	DPJ	Toru Kikawada	DPJ	62,684	41.5	19,145	Naomi Sato	TPJ	28.8	DPJ hold
Iwate 4th	Ichirō Ozawa	TPJ	Ichirō Ozawa	TPJ	78,057	45.5	30,170	Takashi Fujiwara	LDP	27.9	TPJ hold
Miyagi 1st	Kazuko Kōri	DPJ	Tōru Doi	LDP	87,482	39.2	26,566	Kazuko Kōri	DPJ	27.3	LDP gain from DPJ
Miyagi 2nd	Yasunori Saito	TPJ	Kenya Akiba	LDP	76,595	33.5	31,279	Masashi Nakano	JRP	19.8	LDP gain from TPJ
Miyagi 3rd	Kiyohito Hashimoto	DPJ	Akihiro Nishimura	LDP	88,801	58.2	41,503	Kiyohito Hashimoto	DPJ	31.0	LDP gain from DPJ
Miyagi 4th	Keiki Ishiyama	DPJ	Shintaro Ito	LDP	80,250	44.3	25,997	Keiki Ishiyama	DPJ	29.9	LDP gain from DPJ
Miyagi 5th	Jun Azumi	DPJ	Jun Azumi	DPJ	62,928	57.9	32,790	Miyo Okubo	LDP	27.7	DPJ hold
Miyagi 6th	Itsunori Onodera	LDP	Itsunori Onodera	LDP	97,405	78.1	76,444	Sayuri Kamata	DPJ	16.8	LDP hold
Akita 1st	Manabu Terata	DPJ	Hiroyuki Togashi	LDP	73,356	46.7	24,113	Manabu Terata	DPJ	31.4	LDP gain from DPJ
Akita 2nd	Hiroshi Kawaguchi	DPJ	Katsutoshi Kaneda	LDP	91,747	51.5	34,355	Hiroshi Kawaguchi	DPJ	32.2	LDP gain from DPJ
Akita 3rd	Kimiko Kyono	TPJ	Nobuhide Minorikawa	LDP	97,164	42.7	22,742	Toshihide Muraoka	JRP	32.7	LDP gain from TPJ
Yamagata 1st	Michihiko Kano	DPJ	Toshiaki Endo	LDP	102,169	54.6	31,758	Michihiko Kano	DPJ	37.6	LDP gain from DPJ
Yamagata 2nd	Yōsuke Kondō	DPJ	Norikazu Suzuki	LDP	100,744	46.1	18,912	Yōsuke Kondō	DPJ	37.4	LDP gain from DPJ
Yamagata 3rd	Koichi Kato	LDP	Juichi Abe	Ind.	71,768	36.0	1,465	Koichi Kato	LDP	35.2	Ind. gain from LDP
Fukushima 1st	Yozaburo Ishihara	TPJ	Yoshitami Kameoka	LDP	121,235	51.0	71,094	Yozaburo Ishihara	TPJ	21.1	LDP gain from TPJ
Fukushima 2nd	Kazumi Ota	TPJ	Takumi Nemoto	LDP	98,913	52.1	71,240	Kazunori Midorikawa	JRP	14.6	LDP gain from TPJ
Fukushima 3rd	Kōichirō Genba	DPJ	Kōichirō Genba	DPJ	107,737	62.3	58,941	Sachiko Kanno	LDP	28.2	DPJ hold
Fukushima 4th	Kōzō Watanabe	DPJ	Ichirō Kanke	LDP	71,751	49.0	21,715	Shinji Oguma	JRP	34.2	LDP gain from DPJ
Fukushima 5th	Izumi Yoshida	DPJ	Goji Sakamoto	LDP	61,440	34.9	6,943	Izumi Yoshida	DPJ	31.0	LDP gain from DPJ

Proportional representation results
Party	Votes	Seats	Rank	Elected member	Constituency	Ratio
LDP	1,238,716 (28.6%)	5	1	Hinako Takahashi	Iwate 1st	78.7%
LDP	1,238,716 (28.6%)	5	1	Takashi Fujiwara	Iwate 4th	61.4%
LDP	1,238,716 (28.6%)	5	1	Hidenori Hashimoto	Iwate 3rd	57.8%
LDP	1,238,716 (28.6%)	5	1	Miyo Okubo	Miyagi 5th	47.9%
LDP	1,238,716 (28.6%)	5	1	Sachiko Kanno	Fukushima 3rd	45.3%
DPJ	805,709 (18.6%)	3	1	Izumi Yoshida	Fukushima 5th	88.7%
DPJ	805,709 (18.6%)	3	1	Yōsuke Kondō	Yamagata 2nd	81.2%
DPJ	805,709 (18.6%)	3	1	Kazuko Kōri	Miyagi 1st	69.6%
JRP	725,006 (16.7%)	2	1	Shinji Oguma	Fukushima 4th	69.7%
JRP	725,006 (16.7%)	2	1	Toshihide Muraoka	Akita 3rd	76.6%
Komei	398,131 (9.2%)	1	1	Yoshihisa Inoue		
TPJ	391,216 (9.0%)	1	1	Koji Hata	Iwate 2nd	66.0%
YP	306,102 (7.1%)	1	1	Hiroki Hayashi	Miyagi 1st	43.8%
JCP	256,838 (5.9%)	1	1	Chizuko Takahashi		

== Northern Kanto block ==
2012 Japanese general election in Northern Kanto
- 16 December 2012

All 52 seats to the House of Representatives
	Majority party	Minority party	Third party
Party	LDP	DPJ	JRP
Last election	10 seats	35 seats	New
Constituency	27	2	0
PR seats	6	3	4
Total	33	5	4
Seat change	▲23	▼30	▲4
	Fourth party	Fifth party	Sixth party
Party	Komeito	Your	TPJ
Last election	2 seats	2 seats	New
Constituency	0	1	0
PR seats	3	2	1
Total	3	3	1
Seat change	▲1	▲1	▲1
	Seventh party	Eighth party
Party	JCP	Ind.
Last election	1 seat	2 seats
Constituency	0	2
PR seats	1	–
Total	1	2
Seat change	0	0

Single-member constituency results in Northern Kanto
Constituency	Previous member		Elected member		Votes	%	Margin	Runner-up		%	Status
Ibaraki 1st	Nobuyuki Fukushima	DPJ	Yoshinori Tadokoro	LDP	103,463	45.3	37,387	Nobuyuki Fukushima	DPJ	29.0	LDP gain from DPJ
Ibaraki 2nd	Masao Ishizu	DPJ	Fukushiro Nukaga	LDP	113,891	56.3	65,969	Masao Ishizu	DPJ	23.7	LDP gain from DPJ
Ibaraki 3rd	Toshiaki Koizumi	TPJ	Yasuhiro Hanashi	LDP	113,158	50.9	66,619	Toshiaki Koizumi	TPJ	20.9	LDP gain from TPJ
Ibaraki 4th	Hiroshi Kajiyama	LDP	Hiroshi Kajiyama	LDP	113,718	65.1	65,323	Mamoru Takano	DPJ	27.7	LDP hold
Ibaraki 5th	Akihiro Ohata	DPJ	Akihiro Ohata	DPJ	61,142	49.3	9,301	Akimasa Ishikawa	LDP	41.8	DPJ hold
Ibaraki 6th	Hiroko Oizumi	DPJ	Yuya Niwa	LDP	91,121	38.2	45,744	Takaya Kano	Ind.	19.0	LDP gain from DPJ
Ibaraki 7th	Kishirō Nakamura	Ind.	Kishirō Nakamura	Ind.	81,157	42.7	21,552	Keiko Nagaoka	LDP	31.4	Ind. hold
Tochigi 1st	Hisatsugu Ishimori	DPJ	Hajime Funada	LDP	100,133	46.6	43,990	Hisatsugu Ishimori	DPJ	26.1	LDP gain from DPJ
Tochigi 2nd	Akio Fukuda	DPJ	Koya Nishikawa	LDP	55,853	38.6	9,582	Akio Fukuda	DPJ	32.0	LDP gain from DPJ
Tochigi 3rd	Yoshimi Watanabe	YP	Yoshimi Watanabe	YP	84,023	60.3	35,111	Kazuo Yana	LDP	35.1	YP hold
Tochigi 4th	Kenji Yamaoka	TPJ	Tsutomu Sato	LDP	109,762	51.1	60,741	Takao Fujioka	YP	22.8	LDP gain from TPJ
Tochigi 5th	Toshimitsu Motegi	LDP	Toshimitsu Motegi	LDP	101,533	67.3	62,907	Yoshitada Tomioka	YP	25.6	LDP hold
Gunma 1st	Takeshi Miyazaki	DPJ	Genichiro Sata	LDP	94,709	45.0	47,874	Hiroshi Ueno	JRP	22.3	LDP gain from DPJ
Gunma 2nd	Takashi Ishizeki	JRP	Toshiro Ino	LDP	87,309	49.6	35,469	Takashi Ishizeki	JRP	29.4	LDP gain from JRP
Gunma 3rd	Masaaki Kakinuma	DPJ	Hiroyoshi Sasagawa	LDP	84,363	51.1	46,485	Masaaki Kakinuma	DPJ	22.9	LDP gain from DPJ
Gunma 4th	Yasuo Fukuda	LDP	Tatsuo Fukuda	LDP	93,220	55.7	50,684	Ayaka Miyaharada	JRP	25.4	LDP hold
Gunma 5th	Yūko Obuchi	LDP	Yūko Obuchi	LDP	134,685	77.3	112,082	Hitoshi Kobayashi	SDP	13.0	LDP hold
Saitama 1st	Koichi Takemasa	DPJ	Hideki Murai	LDP	96,242	39.7	19,659	Koichi Takemasa	DPJ	31.6	LDP gain from DPJ
Saitama 2nd	Ishida Katsuyuki	DPJ	Yoshitaka Shindō	LDP	112,484	46.6	58,880	Yoshikazu Matsumoto	YP	22.2	LDP gain from DPJ
Saitama 3rd	Ritsuo Hosokawa	DPJ	Hitoshi Kikawada	LDP	87,695	35.5	29,105	Ritsuo Hosokawa	DPJ	23.7	LDP gain from DPJ
Saitama 4th	Hideo Jinpu	DPJ	Mayuko Toyota	LDP	71,061	35.9	17,695	Hideo Jinpu	DPJ	27.0	LDP gain from DPJ
Saitama 5th	Yukio Edano	DPJ	Yukio Edano	DPJ	93,585	45.4	9,465	Hideki Makihara	LDP	40.8	DPJ hold
Saitama 6th	Atsushi Oshima	DPJ	Kazuyuki Nakane	LDP	90,871	37.9	198	Atsushi Oshima	DPJ	37.9	LDP gain from DPJ
Saitama 7th	Yasuko Komiyama	TPJ	Saichi Kamiyama	LDP	78,505	35.0	34,077	Kenichi Yaguchi	JRP	19.8	LDP gain from TPJ
Saitama 8th	Masatoshi Onozuka	DPJ	Masahiko Shibayama	LDP	85,375	42.4	38,981	Masatoshi Onozuka	DPJ	23.0	LDP gain from DPJ
Saitama 9th	Fumihiko Igarashi	DPJ	Taku Otsuka	LDP	109,062	47.2	59,081	Fumihiko Igarashi	DPJ	21.6	LDP gain from DPJ
Saitama 10th	Tetsuhisa Matsuzaki	TPJ	Taimei Yamaguchi	LDP	85,846	44.1	29,364	Yunosuke Sakamoto	JRP	28.1	LDP gain from TPJ
Saitama 11th	Ryuji Koizumi	Ind.	Ryuji Koizumi	Ind.	118,916	60.5	63,628	Tomohiro Konno	LDP	28.1	Ind. hold
Saitama 12th	Hiranao Honda	DPJ	Atsushi Nonaka	LDP	65,989	32.0	10,326	Toshikazu Morita	Ind.	27.0	LDP gain from DPJ
Saitama 13th	Yoichiro Morioka	DPJ	Shinako Tsuchiya	LDP	77,623	38.9	32,604	Yoichiro Morioka	DPJ	22.6	LDP gain from DPJ
Saitama 14th	Jo Nakano	DPJ	Hiromi Mitsubayashi	LDP	84,263	37.9	12,314	Yoshihiro Suzuki	JRP	32.4	LDP gain from DPJ
Saitama 15th	Satoshi Takayama	DPJ	Ryosei Tanaka	LDP	88,210	42.7	39,063	Satoshi Takayama	DPJ	23.8	LDP gain from DPJ

Proportional representation results
Party	Votes	Seats	Rank	Elected member	Constituency	Ratio
LDP	1,820,116 (28.1%)	6	1	Hideki Makihara	Saitama 5th	89.9%
LDP	1,820,116 (28.1%)	6	1	Akimasa Ishikawa	Ibaraki 5th	84.8%
LDP	1,820,116 (28.1%)	6	1	Keiko Nagaoka	Ibaraki 7th	73.4%
LDP	1,820,116 (28.1%)	6	1	Kazuo Yana	Tochigi 3rd	58.2%
LDP	1,820,116 (28.1%)	6	1	Tomohiro Konno	Saitama 11th	46.5%
LDP	1,820,116 (28.1%)	6	33	Masayoshi Shintani		
JRP	1,169,781 (18.1%)	4	1	Hiroshi Ueno	Gunma 1st	49.5%
JRP	1,169,781 (18.1%)	4	2	Takashi Ishizeki	Gunma 2nd	59.4%
JRP	1,169,781 (18.1%)	4	3	Yoshihiro Suzuki	Saitama 14th	85.4%
JRP	1,169,781 (18.1%)	4	3	Yunosuke Sakamoto	Saitama 10th	65.8%
DPJ	976,922 (15.1%)	3	1	Atsushi Oshima	Saitama 6th	99.8%
DPJ	976,922 (15.1%)	3	1	Akio Fukuda	Tochigi 2nd	82.8%
DPJ	976,922 (15.1%)	3	1	Koichi Takemasa	Saitama 1st	79.6%
Komei	820,358 (12.7%)	3	1	Keiichi Ishii		
Komei	820,358 (12.7%)	3	2	Mitsunari Okamoto		
Komei	820,358 (12.7%)	3	3	Keiichi Koshimizu		
YP	787,462 (12.2%)	2	1	Koichi Yamauchi		
YP	787,462 (12.2%)	2	2	Yuji Kashiwakura	Tochigi 2nd	68.2%
TPJ	387,625 (6.0%)	1	1	Yasuko Komiyama	Saitama 7th	56.6%
JCP	367,245 (5.7%)	1	1	Tetsuya Shiokawa		

== Southern Kanto block ==
2012 Japanese general election in Southern Kanto
- 16 December 2012

All 56 seats to the House of Representatives
	Majority party	Minority party	Third party
Party	LDP	DPJ	JRP
Last election	11 seats	39 seats	New
Constituency	26	4	0
PR seats	6	4	5
Total	32	8	5
Seat change	▲21	▼31	▲5
	Fourth party	Fifth party	Sixth party
Party	Your	Komeito	TPJ
Last election	2 seats	2 seats	New
Constituency	2	1	0
PR seats	3	2	1
Total	5	3	1
Seat change	▲3	▲1	▲1
	Seventh party	Eighth party	Ninth party
Party	JCP	SDP	Ind.
Last election	1 seat	1 seat	0 seats
Constituency	0	0	1
PR seats	1	0	–
Total	1	0	1
Seat change	0	▼1	▲1

Single-member constituency results in Southern Kanto
Constituency	Previous member		Elected member		Votes	%	Margin	Runner-up		%	Status
Chiba 1st	Kaname Tajima	DPJ	Kaname Tajima	DPJ	76,914	33.2	6,987	Hiroaki Kadoyama	LDP	30.2	DPJ hold
Chiba 2nd	Yu Kuroda	TPJ	Takayuki Kobayashi	LDP	100,551	40.3	46,428	Toshihiro Nakada	JRP	21.7	LDP gain from TPJ
Chiba 3rd	Kazumasa Okajima	TPJ	Hirokazu Matsuno	LDP	80,710	44.2	49,549	Kazumasa Okajima	TPJ	17.1	LDP gain from TPJ
Chiba 4th	Yoshihiko Noda	DPJ	Yoshihiko Noda	DPJ	163,334	57.3	91,147	Mikio Fujita	LDP	25.3	DPJ hold
Chiba 5th	Hirotami Murakoshi	DPJ	Kentaro Sonoura	LDP	81,772	35.3	30,566	Hirotami Murakoshi	DPJ	22.1	LDP gain from DPJ
Chiba 6th	Yukio Ubukata	DPJ	Hiromichi Watanabe	LDP	69,689	35.4	23,358	Yukio Ubukata	DPJ	23.5	LDP gain from DPJ
Chiba 7th	Akira Uchiyama	TPJ	Ken Saitō	LDP	104,839	45.8	75,174	Chikatsu Hayashi	JRP	13.0	LDP gain from TPJ
Chiba 8th	Kimiaki Matsuzaki	DPJ	Yoshitaka Sakurada	LDP	93,882	41.0	37,051	Kimiaki Matsuzaki	DPJ	24.8	LDP gain from DPJ
Chiba 9th	Soichiro Okuno	DPJ	Masatoshi Akimoto	LDP	80,024	35.5	16,602	Soichiro Okuno	DPJ	28.1	LDP gain from DPJ
Chiba 10th	Hajime Yatagawa	DPJ	Motoo Hayashi	LDP	110,139	57.1	47,339	Hajime Yatagawa	DPJ	32.5	LDP gain from DPJ
Chiba 11th	Eisuke Mori	LDP	Eisuke Mori	LDP	128,785	65.0	80,671	Kenichi Kaneko	TPJ	24.3	LDP hold
Chiba 12th	Yasukazu Hamada	LDP	Yasukazu Hamada	LDP	139,935	65.2	81,444	Atsushi Chugo	TPJ	27.2	LDP hold
Chiba 13th	Yasuhiko Wakai	DPJ	Takaki Shirasuka	LDP	75,152	41.0	24,486	Yasuhiko Wakai	DPJ	27.7	LDP gain from DPJ
Kanagawa 1st	Mieko Nakabayashi	DPJ	Jun Matsumoto	LDP	101,238	41.2	50,311	Mieko Nakabayashi	DPJ	20.7	LDP gain from DPJ
Kanagawa 2nd	Yoshihide Suga	LDP	Yoshihide Suga	LDP	138,040	57.9	66,738	Kazuya Mimura	DPJ	29.9	LDP hold
Kanagawa 3rd	Eiko Okamoto	DPJ	Hachiro Okonogi	LDP	85,451	37.0	45,670	Mayumi Takahashi	JRP	17.2	LDP gain from DPJ
Kanagawa 4th	Kazuyoshi Nagashima	DPJ	Keiichiro Asao	YP	100,632	48.7	43,090	Tomohiro Yamamoto	LDP	27.8	YP gain from DPJ
Kanagawa 5th	Keishu Tanaka	DPJ	Manabu Sakai	LDP	107,796	40.8	61,164	Daichi Yuzawa	JRP	17.6	LDP gain from DPJ
Kanagawa 6th	Motohisa Ikeda	DPJ	Isamu Ueda	Komei	82,147	37.4	12,636	Yoichiro Aoyagi	YP	31.6	Komei gain from DPJ
Kanagawa 7th	Nobuhiko Suto	DPJ	Keisuke Suzuki	LDP	105,920	42.1	47,540	Asako Tanaka	YP	23.2	LDP gain from DPJ
Kanagawa 8th	Kenji Eda	YP	Kenji Eda	YP	127,294	54.1	66,651	Mineyuki Fukuda	LDP	25.8	YP hold
Kanagawa 9th	Hirofumi Ryu	DPJ	Hirofumi Ryu	DPJ	67,448	36.8	9,078	Norihiro Nakayama	LDP	31.9	DPJ hold
Kanagawa 10th	Koriki Jojima	DPJ	Kazunori Tanaka	LDP	104,994	37.5	43,739	Koriki Jojima	DPJ	21.9	LDP gain from DPJ
Kanagawa 11th	Shinjirō Koizumi	LDP	Shinjirō Koizumi	LDP	184,360	79.9	159,226	Hayashi Kotaro	DPJ	10.9	LDP hold
Kanagawa 12th	Ikko Nakatsuka	DPJ	Tsuyoshi Hoshino	LDP	73,476	34.1	22,500	Tomoko Abe	TPJ	23.6	LDP gain from DPJ
Kanagawa 13th	Hidenori Tachibana	DPJ	Akira Amari	LDP	111,733	43.0	60,907	Naotoshi Sugawara	YP	19.5	LDP gain from DPJ
Kanagawa 14th	Kentaro Motomura	DPJ	Jiro Akama	LDP	100,494	39.6	34,662	Kentaro Motomura	DPJ	26.0	LDP gain from DPJ
Kanagawa 15th	Taro Kono	LDP	Taro Kono	LDP	192,604	80.0	144,406	Yuka Asaka	JCP	20.0	LDP hold
Kanagawa 16th	Yuichi Goto	DPJ	Hiroyuki Yoshiie	LDP	98,958	40.7	8,077	Yuichi Goto	DPJ	37.3	LDP gain from DPJ
Kanagawa 17th	Yosuke Kamiyama	DPJ	Karen Makishima	LDP	98,019	38.8	43,682	Yoshiyuki Inoue	YP	21.5	LDP gain from DPJ
Kanagawa 18th	Takeshi Hidaka	TPJ	Daishiro Yamagiwa	LDP	82,333	40.9	38,460	Jiro Funakawa	YP	21.8	LDP gain from TPJ
Yamanashi 1st	Sakihito Ozawa	JRP	Noriko Miyagawa	LDP	54,930	43.6	20,516	Sakihito Ozawa	JRP	27.3	LDP gain from JRP
Yamanashi 2nd	Takehiro Sakaguchi	DPJ	Kotaro Nagasaki	Ind.	62,135	40.5	7,123	Noriko Horiuchi	LDP	35.8	Ind. gain from DPJ
Yamanashi 3rd	Hitoshi Goto	DPJ	Hitoshi Goto	DPJ	50,362	33.4	172	Shinichi Nakatani	LDP	33.3	DPJ hold

Proportional representation results
Party	Votes	Seats	Rank	Elected member	Constituency	Ratio
LDP	2,020,043 (26.4%)	6	1	Shinichi Nakatani	Yamanashi 3rd	99.7%
LDP	2,020,043 (26.4%)	6	1	Hiroaki Kadoyama	Chiba 1st	90.9%
LDP	2,020,043 (26.4%)	6	1	Noriko Horiuchi	Yamanashi 2nd	88.5%
LDP	2,020,043 (26.4%)	6	1	Norihiro Nakayama	Kanagawa 9th	86.5%
LDP	2,020,043 (26.4%)	6	1	Tomohiro Yamamoto	Kanagawa 4th	57.2%
LDP	2,020,043 (26.4%)	6	1	Mineyuki Fukuda	Kanagawa 8th	47.6%
JRP	1,443,270 (18.9%)	5	1	Sakihito Ozawa	Yamanashi 1st	62.7%
JRP	1,443,270 (18.9%)	5	2	Manabu Matsuda		
JRP	1,443,270 (18.9%)	5	3	Takashi Tanuma	Chiba 1st	58.1%
JRP	1,443,270 (18.9%)	5	3	Yuzuru Nishida	Chiba 9th	57.2%
JRP	1,443,270 (18.9%)	5	3	Tamotsu Shiiki	Chiba 13th	53.9%
DPJ	1,323,048 (17.3%)	4	1	Yuichi Goto	Kanagawa 16th	91.8%
DPJ	1,323,048 (17.3%)	4	1	Soichiro Okuno	Chiba 9th	79.3%
DPJ	1,323,048 (17.3%)	4	1	Yasuhiko Wakai	Chiba 13th	67.4%
DPJ	1,323,048 (17.3%)	4	1	Yukio Ubukata	Chiba 6th	66.5%
YP	951,294 (12.4%)	3	1	Yoichiro Aoyagi	Kanagawa 6th	84.6%
YP	951,294 (12.4%)	3	1	Katsuhito Nakajima	Yamanashi 3rd	76.7%
YP	951,294 (12.4%)	3	1	Tsuyoshi Shiina	Kanagawa 9th	61.5%
Komei	810,936 (10.6%)	2	1	Shigeyuki Tomita		
Komei	810,936 (10.6%)	2	2	Noriko Furuya		
TPJ	477,309 (6.2%)	1	1	Tomoko Abe	Kanagawa 12th	69.4%
JCP	447,890 (5.9%)	1	1	Kazuo Shii		

== Tokyo block ==
2012 Japanese general election in Tokyo
- 16 December 2012

All 42 seats to the House of Representatives
	Majority party	Minority party	Third party
Party	LDP	DPJ	JRP
Last election	9 seats	29 seats	New
Constituency	21	2	0
PR seats	5	3	3
Total	26	5	3
Seat change	▲17	▼24	▲3
	Fourth party	Fifth party	Sixth party
Party	Your	Komeito	JCP
Last election	1 seat	2 seats	1 seat
Constituency	1	1	0
PR seats	2	2	1
Total	3	3	1
Seat change	▲2	▲1	0
	Seventh party
Party	TPJ
Last election	New
Constituency	0
PR seats	1
Total	1
Seat change	▲1

Single-member constituency results in Tokyo
Constituency	Previous member		Elected member		Votes	%	Margin	Runner-up		%	Status
Tokyo 1st	Banri Kaieda	DPJ	Miki Yamada	LDP	82,013	29.3	1,134	Banri Kaieda	DPJ	28.9	LDP gain from DPJ
Tokyo 2nd	Yoshikatsu Nakayama	DPJ	Kiyoto Tsuji	LDP	84,663	32.4	19,987	Yoshikatsu Nakayama	DPJ	24.7	LDP gain from DPJ
Tokyo 3rd	Jin Matsubara	DPJ	Hirotaka Ishihara	LDP	122,314	42.0	2,016	Jin Matsubara	DPJ	41.3	LDP gain from DPJ
Tokyo 4th	Norihiko Fujita	DPJ	Masaaki Taira	LDP	96,810	39.4	51,811	Hidekazu Inubushi	JRP	18.3	LDP gain from DPJ
Tokyo 5th	Yoshio Tezuka	DPJ	Kenji Wakamiya	LDP	85,408	30.5	19,630	Yoshio Tezuka	DPJ	23.5	LDP gain from DPJ
Tokyo 6th	Yoko Komiyama	DPJ	Takao Ochi	LDP	98,112	32.9	27,986	Yoko Komiyama	DPJ	23.5	LDP gain from DPJ
Tokyo 7th	Akira Nagatsuma	DPJ	Akira Nagatsuma	DPJ	100,872	38.2	21,824	Fumiaki Matsumoto	LDP	30.0	DPJ hold
Tokyo 8th	Nobuteru Ishihara	LDP	Nobuteru Ishihara	LDP	132,521	46.9	61,493	Taro Yamamoto	Ind.	25.2	LDP hold
Tokyo 9th	Takatane Kuichi	TPJ	Isshu Sugawara	LDP	145,013	53.5	89,277	Takatane Kuichi	TPJ	20.6	LDP gain from TPJ
Tokyo 10th	Takako Ebata	DPJ	Yuriko Koike	LDP	108,983	53.7	61,490	Takako Ebata	DPJ	23.4	LDP gain from DPJ
Tokyo 11th	Hakubun Shimomura	LDP	Hakubun Shimomura	LDP	116,521	45.5	67,187	Takashi Ino	JRP	19.3	LDP hold
Tokyo 12th	Ai Aoki	TPJ	Akihiro Ota	Komei	114,052	51.4	57,620	Ai Aoki	TPJ	25.4	Komei gain from TPJ
Tokyo 13th	Tairou Hirayama	TPJ	Ichirō Kamoshita	LDP	115,797	50.3	68,850	Hiroshi Kawaguchi	JRP	20.4	LDP gain from TPJ
Tokyo 14th	Taketsuka Kimura	TPJ	Midori Matsushima	LDP	90,608	43.5	50,296	Noguchi Toshu	JRP	18.9	LDP gain from TPJ
Tokyo 15th	Shozo Azuma	TPJ	Mito Kakizawa	YP	88,222	36.9	14,063	Tsukasa Akimoto	LDP	31.0	YP gain from TPJ
Tokyo 16th	Akihiro Hatsushika	TPJ	Hideo Ōnishi	LDP	95,222	38.0	48,685	Hirosato Nakagawa	JRP	18.6	LDP gain from TPJ
Tokyo 17th	Katsuei Hirasawa	LDP	Katsuei Hirasawa	LDP	131,471	55.1	86,186	Hitoshi Kobayashi	JRP	19.0	LDP hold
Tokyo 18th	Naoto Kan	DPJ	Masatada Tsuchiya	LDP	84,078	32.2	10,136	Naoto Kan	DPJ	28.3	LDP gain from DPJ
Tokyo 19th	Yoshinori Suematsu	DPJ	Yohei Matsumoto	LDP	101,362	34.4	19,872	Yoshinori Suematsu	DPJ	27.6	LDP gain from DPJ
Tokyo 20th	Koichi Kato	DPJ	Seiji Kihara	LDP	98,070	40.4	36,551	Koichi Kato	DPJ	25.3	LDP gain from DPJ
Tokyo 21st	Akihisa Nagashima	DPJ	Akihisa Nagashima	DPJ	82,831	36.5	12,761	Kiyoshi Odawara	LDP	30.8	DPJ hold
Tokyo 22nd	Ikuo Yamahana	DPJ	Tatsuya Ito	LDP	115,290	40.0	49,080	Ikuo Yamahana	DPJ	23.0	LDP gain from DPJ
Tokyo 23rd	Mari Kushibuchi	DPJ	Masanobu Ogura	LDP	87,192	30.2	23,223	Mari Kushibuchi	DPJ	22.1	LDP gain from DPJ
Tokyo 24th	Yukihiko Akutsu	DPJ	Kōichi Hagiuda	LDP	121,433	44.2	60,649	Yukihiko Akutsu	DPJ	22.1	LDP gain from DPJ
Tokyo 25th	Shinji Inoue	LDP	Shinji Inoue	LDP	100,523	54.4	17,772	Mitsuaki Takeda	DPJ	15.6	LDP hold

Proportional representation results
Party	Votes	Seats	Rank	Elected member	Constituency	Ratio
LDP	1,626,057 (24.9%)	5	1	Kiyoshi Odawara	Tokyo 21st	84.6%
LDP	1,626,057 (24.9%)	5	1	Tsukasa Akimoto	Tokyo 15th	84.1%
LDP	1,626,057 (24.9%)	5	1	Fumiaki Matsumoto	Tokyo 7th	78.4%
LDP	1,626,057 (24.9%)	5	25	Tsuneo Akaeda		
LDP	1,626,057 (24.9%)	5	26	Tsuyoshi Tabata		
JRP	1,298,309 (19.9%)	3	1	Shintaro Ishihara		
JRP	1,298,309 (19.9%)	3	2	Hirofumi Imamura		
JRP	1,298,309 (19.9%)	3	3	Hiroshi Yamada	Tokyo 19th	64.0%
DPJ	1,008,011 (15.4%)	3	1	Banri Kaieda	Tokyo 1st	98.6%
DPJ	1,008,011 (15.4%)	3	1	Jin Matsubara	Tokyo 3rd	98.4%
DPJ	1,008,011 (15.4%)	3	1	Naoto Kan	Tokyo 18th	87.9%
YP	762,730 (11.7%)	2	1	Toshiaki Okuma	Tokyo 2nd	57.5%
YP	762,730 (11.7%)	2	1	Hidehiro Mitani	Tokyo 5th	54.6%
Komei	662,743 (10.1%)	2	1	Yōsuke Takagi		
Komei	662,743 (10.1%)	2	2	Michiyo Takagi		
JCP	484,365 (7.4%)	1	1	Akira Kasai		
TPJ	448,689 (6.9%)	1	1	Ai Aoki	Tokyo 12th	49.5%

== Hokuriku-Shin'etsu block ==
2012 Japanese general election in Hokuriku-Shin'etsu block
- 16 December 2012

All 31 seats to the House of Representatives
	Majority party	Minority party	Third party
Party	LDP	DPJ	JRP
Last election	10 seats	20 seats	New
Constituency	18	2	0
PR seats	4	2	3
Total	22	4	3
Seat change	▲12	▼16	▲3
	Fourth party	Fifth party
Party	Komeito	Your
Last election	1 seat	0 seats
Constituency	0	0
PR seats	1	1
Total	1	1
Seat change	0	▲1

Single-member constituency results in Hokuriku-Shin'etsu
Constituency	Previous member		Elected member		Votes	%	Margin	Runner-up		%	Status
Niigata 1st	Chinami Nishimura	DPJ	Toru Ishizaki	LDP	97,010	44.1	18,727	Chinami Nishimura	DPJ	35.6	LDP gain from DPJ
Niigata 2nd	Eiichiro Washio	DPJ	Kenichi Hosoda	LDP	81,537	45.5	12,148	Eiichiro Washio	DPJ	38.7	LDP gain from DPJ
Niigata 3rd	Takahiro Kuroiwa	DPJ	Hiroaki Saito	LDP	92,280	50.2	16,145	Takahiro Kuroiwa	DPJ	41.4	LDP gain from DPJ
Niigata 4th	Makiko Kikuta	DPJ	Megumi Kaneko	LDP	80,514	42.6	14,057	Makiko Kikuta	DPJ	35.2	LDP gain from DPJ
Niigata 5th	Makiko Tanaka	DPJ	Tadayoshi Nagashima	LDP	80,488	45.7	28,985	Makiko Tanaka	DPJ	29.3	LDP gain from DPJ
Niigata 6th	Nobutaka Tsutsui	DPJ	Shuichi Takatori	LDP	98,676	55.1	32,112	Nobutaka Tsutsui	DPJ	37.2	LDP gain from DPJ
Toyama 1st	Muneaki Murai	DPJ	Hiroaki Tabata	LDP	70,268	48.6	27,196	Muneaki Murai	DPJ	29.8	LDP gain from DPJ
Toyama 2nd	Mitsuhiro Miyakoshi	LDP	Mitsuhiro Miyakoshi	LDP	102,251	75.0	76,855	Atsushi Azuma	SDP	18.6	LDP hold
Toyama 3rd	Keiichiro Tachibana	LDP	Keiichiro Tachibana	LDP	162,891	77.1	127,867	Hiroaki Hozawa	DPJ	16.6	LDP hold
Ishikawa 1st	Ken Okuda	DPJ	Hiroshi Hase	LDP	99,544	47.9	51,962	Ken Okuda	DPJ	22.9	LDP gain from DPJ
Ishikawa 2nd	Yoshirō Mori	LDP	Hajime Sasaki	LDP	123,283	64.5	85,682	Keiko Miyamoto	DPJ	19.7	LDP hold
Ishikawa 3rd	Kazuya Kondo	DPJ	Shigeo Kitamura	LDP	89,266	54.4	26,723	Kazuya Kondo	DPJ	38.2	LDP gain from DPJ
Fukui 1st	Tomomi Inada	LDP	Tomomi Inada	LDP	68,027	52.6	38,405	Koji Suzuki	JRP	22.9	LDP hold
Fukui 2nd	Taku Yamamoto	LDP	Taku Yamamoto	LDP	68,126	52.9	29,772	Masaaki Itokawa	DPJ	29.8	LDP hold
Fukui 3rd	Tsuyoshi Takagi	LDP	Tsuyoshi Takagi	LDP	77,543	57.9	49,179	Isao Matsumiya	DPJ	21.2	LDP hold
Nagano 1st	Takashi Shinohara	DPJ	Takashi Shinohara	DPJ	89,400	36.6	9,540	Yutaka Komatsu	LDP	32.7	DPJ hold
Nagano 2nd	Mitsu Shimojo	DPJ	Shunsuke Mutai	LDP	93,092	39.5	28,814	Mitsu Shimojo	DPJ	27.3	LDP gain from DPJ
Nagano 3rd	Tsutomu Hata	DPJ	Yoshiyuki Terashima	DPJ	69,843	27.8	2,093	Yosei Ide	YP	26.9	DPJ hold
Nagano 4th	Koji Yazaki	DPJ	Shigeyuki Goto	LDP	68,083	43.9	20,994	Koji Yazaki	DPJ	30.3	LDP gain from DPJ
Nagano 5th	Gaku Kato	TPJ	Ichiro Miyashita	LDP	99,225	52.3	68,488	Gaku Kato	TPJ	16.2	LDP gain from TPJ

Proportional representation results
Party	Votes	Seats	Rank	Elected member	Constituency	Ratio
LDP	1,162,095 (31.7%)	4	1	Hitoshi Kiuchi	Nagano 3rd	89.5%
LDP	1,162,095 (31.7%)	4	1	Yutaka Komatsu	Nagano 1st	89.3%
LDP	1,162,095 (31.7%)	4	21	Fumio Nagayama		
LDP	1,162,095 (31.7%)	4	22	Shigeyoshi Sukeda		
JRP	707,497 (19.3%)	3	1	Hiroshi Nakada		
JRP	707,497 (19.3%)	3	2	Takahito Miyazawa	Nagano 1st	53.5%
JRP	707,497 (19.3%)	3	2	Tomoyuki Momose	Nagano 2nd	53.2%
DPJ	682,159 (18.6%)	2	1	Eiichiro Washio	Niigata 2nd	85.1%
DPJ	682,159 (18.6%)	2	1	Makiko Kikuta	Niigata 4th	82.5%
Komei	307,138 (8.4%)	1	1	Yoshio Urushibara		
YP	275,399 (7.5%)	1	1	Yosei Ide	Nagano 3rd	97.0%

== Tokai block ==
2012 Japanese general election in Tokai block
- 16 December 2012

All 54 seats to the House of Representatives
	Majority party	Minority party	Third party
Party	LDP	DPJ	JRP
Last election	9 seats	41 seats	New
Constituency	27	6	0
PR seats	7	4	4
Total	34	10	4
Seat change	▲25	▼31	▲4
	Fourth party	Fifth party	Sixth party
Party	Komeito	Your	TPJ
Last election	2 seats	0 seats	New
Constituency	0	0	0
PR seats	2	2	1
Total	2	2	1
Seat change	0	▲2	▲1
	Seventh party
Party	JCP
Last election	1 seat
Constituency	0
PR seats	1
Total	1
Seat change	0

Single-member constituency results in Tokai
Constituency	Previous member		Elected member		Votes	%	Margin	Runner-up		%	Status
Gifu 1st	Masanao Shibahashi	DPJ	Seiko Noda	LDP	90,164	49.9	35,910	Masanao Shibahashi	DPJ	30.0	LDP gain from DPJ
Gifu 2nd	Yasufumi Tanahashi	LDP	Yasufumi Tanahashi	LDP	114,983	63.4	83,361	Ben Hashimoto	TPJ	17.4	LDP hold
Gifu 3rd	Yasuhiro Sonoda	DPJ	Yoji Muto	LDP	120,865	50.8	50,758	Yasuhiro Sonoda	DPJ	29.5	LDP gain from DPJ
Gifu 4th	Kazuyoshi Kaneko	LDP	Kazuyoshi Kaneko	LDP	121,761	53.1	62,312	Masato Imai	JRP	25.9	LDP hold
Gifu 5th	Yoshinobu Achiha	DPJ	Keiji Furuya	LDP	98,718	55.6	43,435	Yoshinobu Achiha	DPJ	31.1	LDP gain from DPJ
Shizuoka 1st	Seishu Makino	DPJ	Yōko Kamikawa	LDP	81,278	36.2	27,505	Seishu Makino	DPJ	23.9	LDP gain from DPJ
Shizuoka 2nd	Shogo Tsugawa	DPJ	Tatsunori Ibayashi	LDP	108,510	43.9	31,084	Shogo Tsugawa	DPJ	31.3	LDP gain from DPJ
Shizuoka 3rd	Nobuhiro Koyama	DPJ	Hiroyuki Miyazawa	LDP	94,477	40.3	30,546	Nozomu Suzuki	JRP	27.3	LDP gain from DPJ
Shizuoka 4th	Kenji Tamura	DPJ	Yoshio Mochizuki	LDP	101,048	53.1	40,059	Kenji Tamura	DPJ	32.1	LDP gain from DPJ
Shizuoka 5th	Goshi Hosono	DPJ	Goshi Hosono	DPJ	156,887	59.0	72,087	Takeru Yoshikawa	LDP	31.9	DPJ hold
Shizuoka 6th	Shu Watanabe	DPJ	Shu Watanabe	DPJ	116,084	45.6	12,117	Takaaki Katsumata	LDP	40.8	DPJ hold
Shizuoka 7th	Minoru Kiuchi	LDP	Minoru Kiuchi	LDP	125,315	59.6	84,863	Takeshi Saiki	DPJ	19.2	LDP hold
Shizuoka 8th	Susumu Saito	DPJ	Ryū Shionoya	LDP	97,125	44.4	38,197	Kentaro Genma	JRP	26.9	LDP gain from DPJ
Aichi 1st	Yuko Sato	TPJ	Hiromichi Kumada	LDP	77,215	40.7	16,922	Yuko Sato	TPJ	31.9	LDP gain from TPJ
Aichi 2nd	Motohisa Furukawa	DPJ	Motohisa Furukawa	DPJ	94,058	44.8	26,972	Tetsuya Togo	LDP	31.9	DPJ hold
Aichi 3rd	Shoichi Kondo	DPJ	Yoshitaka Ikeda	LDP	77,700	36.7	3,773	Shoichi Kondo	DPJ	34.9	LDP gain from DPJ
Aichi 4th	Yoshio Maki	TPJ	Shōzō Kudō	LDP	63,932	34.0	22,202	Yoshio Maki	TPJ	22.2	LDP gain from TPJ
Aichi 5th	Hirotaka Akamatsu	DPJ	Kenji Kanda	LDP	67,218	32.0	1,795	Hirotaka Akamatsu	DPJ	31.1	LDP gain from DPJ
Aichi 6th	Hideki Niwa	LDP	Hideki Niwa	LDP	113,991	49.1	57,347	Masaki Amano	DPJ	14.4	LDP hold
Aichi 7th	Shiori Yamao	DPJ	Junji Suzuki	LDP	110,390	42.8	17,992	Shiori Yamao	DPJ	35.9	LDP gain from DPJ
Aichi 8th	Yutaka Banno	DPJ	Tadahiko Ito	LDP	115,407	46.7	34,329	Yutaka Banno	DPJ	32.8	LDP gain from DPJ
Aichi 9th	Mitsunori Okamoto	DPJ	Yasumasa Nagasaka	LDP	93,757	39.4	31,724	Mitsunori Okamoto	DPJ	26.1	LDP gain from DPJ
Aichi 10th	Kazumi Sugimoto	YP	Tetsuma Esaki	LDP	96,548	41.4	35,985	Kazumi Sugimoto	YP	26.0	LDP gain from YP
Aichi 11th	Shinichiro Furumoto	DPJ	Shinichiro Furumoto	DPJ	126,724	51.9	35,560	Tetsuya Yagi	LDP	37.3	DPJ hold
Aichi 12th	Yasuhiro Nakane	DPJ	Shuhei Aoyama	LDP	91,816	32.3	9,453	Yasuhiro Nakane	DPJ	29.0	LDP gain from DPJ
Aichi 13th	Kensuke Onishi	DPJ	Sei Oomi	LDP	98,670	40.3	1,483	Kensuke Onishi	DPJ	39.7	LDP gain from DPJ
Aichi 14th	Katsumasa Suzuki	TPJ	Soichiro Imaeda	LDP	71,881	44.7	12,528	Katsumasa Suzuki	TPJ	36.9	LDP gain from TPJ
Aichi 15th	Kazuyoshi Morimoto	DPJ	Yukinori Nemoto	LDP	73,521	36.6	24,468	Kazuyoshi Morimoto	DPJ	24.4	LDP gain from DPJ
Mie 1st	Hiroshi Nakai	DPJ	Jirō Kawasaki	LDP	88,989	47.3	34,019	Naohisa Matsuda	JRP	29.2	LDP gain from DPJ
Mie 2nd	Masaharu Nakagawa	DPJ	Masaharu Nakagawa	DPJ	79,908	43.1	26,533	Yoshikazu Shimada	LDP	28.8	DPJ hold
Mie 3rd	Katsuya Okada	DPJ	Katsuya Okada	DPJ	126,679	64.1	71,776	Hiroshi Sakurai	LDP	27.8	DPJ hold
Mie 4th	Tetsuo Morimoto	DPJ	Norihisa Tamura	LDP	86,131	57.5	34,188	Tetsuo Morimoto	DPJ	34.7	LDP gain from DPJ
Mie 5th	Norio Mitsuya	LDP	Norio Mitsuya	LDP	101,327	58.9	44,838	Daisuke Fujita	DPJ	32.8	LDP hold

Proportional representation results
Party	Votes	Seats	Rank	Elected member	Constituency	Ratio
LDP	1,966,007 (27.6%)	7	1	Takaaki Katsumata	Shizuoka 6th	89.6%
LDP	1,966,007 (27.6%)	7	1	Tetsuya Yagi	Aichi 11th	71.9%
LDP	1,966,007 (27.6%)	7	1	Tetsuya Togo	Aichi 2nd	71.3%
LDP	1,966,007 (27.6%)	7	1	Yoshikazu Shimada	Mie 2nd	66.8%
LDP	1,966,007 (27.6%)	7	1	Takeru Yoshikawa	Shizuoka 5th	54.1%
LDP	1,966,007 (27.6%)	7	1	Hiroshi Sakurai	Mie 3rd	43.3%
LDP	1,966,007 (27.6%)	7	33	Takashi Kawata		
JRP	1,356,970 (19.0%)	4	1	Takao Fujii		
JRP	1,356,970 (19.0%)	4	2	Masato Imai	Gifu 4th	48.8%
JRP	1,356,970 (19.0%)	4	3	Kazuhiko Shigetoku	Aichi 12th	75.4%
JRP	1,356,970 (19.0%)	4	3	Nozomu Suzuki	Shizuoka 3rd	67.7%
DPJ	1,321,402 (18.5%)	4	1	Kensuke Onishi	Aichi 13th	98.5%
DPJ	1,321,402 (18.5%)	4	1	Hirotaka Akamatsu	Aichi 5th	97.3%
DPJ	1,321,402 (18.5%)	4	1	Shoichi Kondo	Aichi 3rd	95.1%
DPJ	1,321,402 (18.5%)	4	1	Yasuhiro Nakane	Aichi 12th	89.7%
Komei	779,577 (10.9%)	2	1	Yoshinori Oguchi		
Komei	779,577 (10.9%)	2	2	Wataru Ito		
YP	644,087 (9.0%)	2	1	Kazumi Sugimoto	Aichi 10th	62.7%
YP	644,087 (9.0%)	2	1	Masanari Koike	Shizuoka 1st	42.4%
TPJ	511,048 (7.2%)	1	1	Katsumasa Suzuki	Aichi 14th	82.6%
JCP	387,461 (5.4%)	1	1	Kensho Sasaki		

== Kinki block ==
2012 Japanese general election in Kinki block
- 16 December 2012

All 77 seats to the House of Representatives
	Majority party	Minority party	Third party
Party	LDP	JRP	Komeito
Last election	14 seats	New	5 seats
Constituency	24	12	6
PR seats	7	10	4
Total	31	22	10
Seat change	▲17	▲22	▲5
	Fourth party	Fifth party	Sixth party
Party	DPJ	JCP	Your
Last election	52 seats	3 seats	0 seats
Constituency	6	0	0
PR seats	3	2	2
Total	9	2	2
Seat change	▼43	▼1	▲2
	Seventh party	Eighth party	Ninth party
Party	TPJ	SDP	NPN
Last election	New	2 seats	1 seat
Constituency	0	0	0
PR seats	1	0	0
Total	1	0	0
Seat change	▲1	▼2	▼1

Single-member constituency results in Kinki
Constituency	Previous member		Elected member		Votes	%	Margin	Runner-up		%	Status
Shiga 1st	Tatsuo Kawabata	DPJ	Toshitaka Ōoka	LDP	67,259	34.9	6,338	Tatsuo Kawabata	DPJ	31.6	LDP gain from DPJ
Shiga 2nd	Issei Tajima	DPJ	Kenichiro Ueno	LDP	67,182	43.3	18,258	Issei Tajima	DPJ	31.5	LDP gain from DPJ
Shiga 3rd	Taizō Mikazuki	DPJ	Nobuhide Takemura	LDP	57,828	37.7	5,471	Taizō Mikazuki	DPJ	34.8	LDP gain from DPJ
Shiga 4th	Tenzo Okumura	DPJ	Takaya Mutō	LDP	57,049	32.8	9,334	Hiroki Iwanaga	JRP	27.4	LDP gain from DPJ
Kyoto 1st	Tomoyuki Taira	YP	Bunmei Ibuki	LDP	69,287	33.2	22,014	Ikuta Tasaka	JRP	22.7	LDP gain from YP
Kyoto 2nd	Seiji Maehara	DPJ	Seiji Maehara	DPJ	72,170	49.4	30,153	Koji Uenaka	LDP	28.7	DPJ hold
Kyoto 3rd	Kenta Izumi	DPJ	Kensuke Miyazaki	LDP	58,951	31.6	216	Kenta Izumi	DPJ	31.5	LDP gain from DPJ
Kyoto 4th	Keiro Kitagami	DPJ	Hideyuki Tanaka	LDP	73,162	33.1	24,228	Keiro Kitagami	DPJ	22.2	LDP gain from DPJ
Kyoto 5th	Sadakazu Tanigaki	LDP	Sadakazu Tanigaki	LDP	87,879	56.5	48,870	Mai Ohara	DPJ	25.1	LDP hold
Kyoto 6th	Kazunori Yamanoi	DPJ	Kazunori Yamanoi	DPJ	89,672	33.5	8,682	Hiroshi Ando	LDP	30.3	DPJ hold
Osaka 1st	Atsushi Kumada	TPJ	Inoue Hidetaka	JRP	80,230	38.0	25,191	Hiroyuki Onishi	LDP	26.1	JRP gain from TPJ
Osaka 2nd	Hitoshi Hagihara	TPJ	ja	LDP	80,817	40.0	11,617	Yuka Nishine	JRP	34.2	LDP gain from TPJ
Osaka 3rd	Masazumi Nakajima	PNP	Shigeki Sato	Komei	101,910	53.2	52,895	Yui Watanabe	JCP	25.6	Komei gain from PNP
Osaka 4th	Osamu Yoshida	DPJ	Masatoshi Murakami	JRP	95,452	38.6	5,558	Yasuhide Nakayama	LDP	36.4	JRP gain from DPJ
Osaka 5th	Tetsuo Inami	DPJ	Tōru Kunishige	Komei	111,028	53.8	62,070	Seto Kazumasa	JCP	23.7	Komei gain from DPJ
Osaka 6th	Fumiyoshi Murakami	TPJ	Shinichi Isa	Komei	116,855	59.6	72,290	Fumiyoshi Murakami	TPJ	22.7	Komei gain from TPJ
Osaka 7th	Osamu Fujimura	DPJ	Naomi Tokashiki	LDP	70,361	33.3	7,505	Sayuri Uenishi	JRP	29.7	LDP gain from DPJ
Osaka 8th	Kansei Nakano	DPJ	Tomohiko Kinoshita	JRP	76,451	39.9	5,360	Takashi Ōtsuka	LDP	37.1	JRP gain from DPJ
Osaka 9th	Nobumori Otani	DPJ	Yasushi Adachi	JRP	104,015	39.8	14,344	Kenji Harada	LDP	34.3	JRP gain from DPJ
Osaka 10th	Kiyomi Tsujimoto	DPJ	Kenta Matsunami	JRP	71,117	36.2	5,706	Kiyomi Tsujimoto	DPJ	33.3	JRP gain from DPJ
Osaka 11th	Hirofumi Hirano	DPJ	Nobuhisa Ito	JRP	93,763	40.3	26,007	Hirofumi Hirano	DPJ	29.1	JRP gain from DPJ
Osaka 12th	Shinji Tarutoko	DPJ	Tomokatsu Kitagawa	LDP	76,972	39.9	27,222	Ryoma Ishii	YP	25.8	LDP gain from DPJ
Osaka 13th	Akira Nishino	LDP	Koichi Nishino	JRP	109,756	51.5	51,291	Sohei Kamiya	LDP	27.4	JRP gain from LDP
Osaka 14th	Takashi Nagao	LDP	Takashi Tanihata	JRP	108,989	48.6	47,486	Takashi Nagao	LDP	27.4	JRP gain from LDP
Osaka 15th	Kei Otani	TPJ	Yasuto Urano	JRP	91,830	41.2	3,330	Naokazu Takemoto	LDP	39.7	JRP gain from TPJ
Osaka 16th	Hiroyuki Moriyama	DPJ	Kazuo Kitagawa	Komei	86,464	50.8	44,136	Hiroyuki Moriyama	DPJ	24.9	Komei gain from DPJ
Osaka 17th	Megumu Tsuji	TPJ	Nobuyuki Baba	JRP	81,663	44.2	29,029	Nobuko Okashita	LDP	28.5	JRP gain from TPJ
Osaka 18th	Osamu Nakagawa	TPJ	Takashi Endo	JRP	100,312	43.7	16,924	Noboru Kamitani	LDP	36.3	JRP gain from TPJ
Osaka 19th	Takashi Nagayasu	DPJ	Hodaka Maruyama	JRP	65,158	38.4	14,916	Tomu Tanigawa	LDP	29.6	JRP gain from DPJ
Hyogo 1st	Masae Ido	DPJ	Masahito Moriyama	LDP	76,401	37.2	2,814	Nobuhiko Isaka	YP	35.8	LDP gain from DPJ
Hyogo 2nd	Koichi Mukoyama	DPJ	Kazuyoshi Akaba	Komei	87,969	47.3	44,069	Koichi Mukoyama	DPJ	23.6	Komei gain from DPJ
Hyogo 3rd	Ryuichi Doi	Ind.	Yoshihiro Seki	LDP	67,920	37.8	12,085	Hideto Shinbara	JRP	31.1	LDP gain from Ind.
Hyogo 4th	Shoichi Takahashi	DPJ	Hisayuki Fujii	LDP	104,202	43.1	25,637	Takayuki Shimizu	JRP	32.5	LDP gain from DPJ
Hyogo 5th	Yasuhiro Kajiwara	DPJ	Koichi Tani	LDP	104,403	47.0	53,062	Kē Miki	JRP	23.1	LDP gain from DPJ
Hyogo 6th	Koichiro Ichimura	DPJ	Masaki Ogushi	LDP	99,988	36.0	20,801	Mio Sugita	JRP	28.5	LDP gain from DPJ
Hyogo 7th	Toshiro Ishii	DPJ	Kenji Yamada	LDP	105,092	39.3	24,612	Mitsunari Hatanaka	YP	30.1	LDP gain from DPJ
Hyogo 8th	Yasuo Tanaka	NPN	Hiromasa Nakano	Komei	97,526	46.6	34,829	Yasuo Tanaka	NPN	30.0	Komei gain from NPN
Hyogo 9th	Yasutoshi Nishimura	LDP	Yasutoshi Nishimura	LDP	120,590	59.4	75,493	Shunji Tani	JRP	22.2	LDP hold
Hyogo 10th	Yasuhiro Okada	DPJ	Kisaburo Tokai	LDP	87,902	44.2	33,050	Yasuhiro Okada	DPJ	27.6	LDP gain from DPJ
Hyogo 11th	Takeaki Matsumoto	DPJ	Takeaki Matsumoto	DPJ	80,760	39.6	16,251	Nobuhide Zushi	LDP	31.6	DPJ hold
Hyogo 12th	Tsuyoshi Yamaguchi	DPJ	Tsuyoshi Yamaguchi	DPJ	81,528	44.2	25,211	Akira Okazaki	LDP	30.5	DPJ hold
Nara 1st	Sumio Mabuchi	DPJ	Sumio Mabuchi	DPJ	68,712	37.9	7,669	Shigeki Kobayashi	LDP	33.6	DPJ hold
Nara 2nd	Makoto Taki	DPJ	Sanae Takaichi	LDP	86,747	46.7	41,733	Ken Namikawa	JRP	24.2	LDP gain from DPJ
Nara 3rd	Masashige Yoshikawa	DPJ	Shinsuke Okuno	LDP	76,073	43.1	26,145	Masayoshi Nishimine	JRP	28.3	LDP gain from DPJ
Nara 4th	Ryotaro Tanose	LDP	Taido Tanose	LDP	82,125	50.6	46,156	Takehisa Matsunami	JRP	22.1	LDP hold
Wakayama 1st	Shūhei Kishimoto	DPJ	Shūhei Kishimoto	DPJ	60,577	34.9	300	Hirofumi Kado	LDP	34.8	DPJ hold
Wakayama 2nd	Naoto Sakaguchi	JRP	Masatoshi Ishida	LDP	72,957	52.6	36,847	Naoto Sakaguchi	JRP	26.1	LDP gain from JRP
Wakayama 3rd	Toshihiro Nikai	LDP	Toshihiro Nikai	LDP	112,916	60.4	60,558	Daisuke Yamashita	JRP	28.0	LDP hold

Proportional representation results
Party	Votes	Seats	Rank	Elected member	Constituency	Ratio
JRP	2,999,020 (30.8%)	10	1	Hideo Higashikokubaru		
JRP	2,999,020 (30.8%)	10	2	Shingo Nishimura		
JRP	2,999,020 (30.8%)	10	3	Naoto Sakaguchi	Wakayama 2nd	49.5%
JRP	2,999,020 (30.8%)	10	3	Kē Miki	Hyogo 5th	49.2%
JRP	2,999,020 (30.8%)	10	11	Hiroshi Miyake		
JRP	2,999,020 (30.8%)	10	12	Sayuri Uenishi	Osaka 7th	89.3%
JRP	2,999,020 (30.8%)	10	12	Yuka Nishine	Osaka 2nd	85.6%
JRP	2,999,020 (30.8%)	10	12	Hiroki Iwanaga	Shiga 4th	83.6%
JRP	2,999,020 (30.8%)	10	12	Hideto Shinbara	Hyogo 3rd	82.2%
JRP	2,999,020 (30.8%)	10	12	Mio Sugita	Hyogo 6th	79.2%
LDP	2,326,005 (23.9%)	7	1	Hirofumi Kado	Wakayama 1st	99.5%
LDP	2,326,005 (23.9%)	7	1	Naokazu Takemoto	Osaka 15th	96.4%
LDP	2,326,005 (23.9%)	7	1	Yasuhide Nakayama	Osaka 4th	94.2%
LDP	2,326,005 (23.9%)	7	1	Takashi Ōtsuka	Osaka 8th	93.0%
LDP	2,326,005 (23.9%)	7	1	Hiroshi Ando	Kyoto 6th	90.3%
LDP	2,326,005 (23.9%)	7	1	Shigeki Kobayashi	Nara 1st	88.8%
LDP	2,326,005 (23.9%)	7	1	Kenji Harada	Osaka 9th	86.2%
Komei	1,234,345 (12.7%)	4	1	Yuzuru Takeuchi		
Komei	1,234,345 (12.7%)	4	2	Tomoko Ukishima		
Komei	1,234,345 (12.7%)	4	3	Naoya Higuchi		
Komei	1,234,345 (12.7%)	4	4	Susumu Hamamura		
DPJ	1,173,051 (12.0%)	3	1	Kenta Izumi	Kyoto 3rd	99.6%
DPJ	1,173,051 (12.0%)	3	1	Taizō Mikazuki	Shiga 3rd	92.1%
DPJ	1,173,051 (12.0%)	3	1	Kiyomi Tsujimoto	Osaka 10th	92.0%
JCP	732,976 (7.5%)	2	1	Keiji Kokuta		
JCP	732,976 (7.5%)	2	2	Takeshi Miyamoto		
YP	635,381 (6.5%)	2	1	Nobuhiko Isaka	Hyogo 1st	96.3%
YP	635,381 (6.5%)	2	1	Mitsunari Hatanaka	Hyogo 7th	76.6%
TPJ	481,603 (4.9%)	1	1	Fumiyoshi Murakami	Osaka 6th	38.1%

== Chugoku block ==
2012 Japanese general election in Chugoku block
- 16 December 2012

All 31 seats to the House of Representatives
	Majority party	Minority party	Third party
Party	LDP	JRP	DPJ
Last election	14 seats	New	14 seats
Constituency	18	1	0
PR seats	5	2	2
Total	23	3	2
Seat change	▲8	▲3	▼12
	Fourth party	Fifth party	Sixth party
Party	Komeito	TPJ	PNP
Last election	1 seat	New	1 seat
Constituency	0	1	0
PR seats	2	0	0
Total	2	1	0
Seat change	▲1	▲1	▼1

Single-member constituency results in Chugoku
Constituency	Previous member		Elected member		Votes	%	Margin	Runner-up		%	Status
Tottori 1st	Shigeru Ishiba	LDP	Shigeru Ishiba	LDP	124,746	84.5	107,196	Naruyuki Tsukada	JCP	11.9	LDP hold
Tottori 2nd	Ryosei Akazawa	LDP	Ryosei Akazawa	LDP	87,395	60.8	41,667	Shunji Yuhara	DPJ	31.8	LDP hold
Shimane 1st	Hiroyuki Hosoda	LDP	Hiroyuki Hosoda	LDP	112,605	64.7	65,262	Hisaaki Komuro	DPJ	27.2	LDP hold
Shimane 2nd	Wataru Takeshita	LDP	Wataru Takeshita	LDP	135,270	67.7	87,224	Shogo Ishida	DPJ	24.1	LDP hold
Okayama 1st	Ichiro Aisawa	LDP	Ichiro Aisawa	LDP	100,960	56.3	59,702	Takashi Takai	DPJ	23.0	LDP hold
Okayama 2nd	Keisuke Tsumura	DPJ	Takashi Yamashita	LDP	82,061	52.8	24,488	Keisuke Tsumura	DPJ	37.0	LDP gain from DPJ
Okayama 3rd	Takeo Hiranuma	JRP	Takeo Hiranuma	JRP	73,752	44.8	19,766	Toshiko Abe	LDP	32.8	JRP hold
Okayama 4th	Michiyoshi Yunoki	DPJ	Gaku Hashimoto	LDP	91,155	46.4	26,862	Michiyoshi Yunoki	DPJ	32.7	LDP gain from DPJ
Okayama 5th	Katsunobu Katō	LDP	Katsunobu Katō	LDP	101,117	66.7	61,128	Hiroki Hanasaki	DPJ	36.4	LDP hold
Hiroshima 1st	Fumio Kishida	LDP	Fumio Kishida	LDP	103,689	63.5	78,260	Koichi Nonaka	DPJ	15.6	LDP hold
Hiroshima 2nd	Daisuke Matsumoto	DPJ	Hiroshi Hiraguchi	LDP	109,823	49.7	48,450	Daisuke Matsumoto	DPJ	27.8	LDP gain from DPJ
Hiroshima 3rd	Hiroaki Hashimoto	DPJ	Katsuyuki Kawai	LDP	87,993	46.2	36,327	Hiroaki Hashimoto	DPJ	27.1	LDP gain from DPJ
Hiroshima 4th	Seiki Soramoto	DPJ	Toshinao Nakagawa	LDP	91,611	57.8	38,271	Seiki Soramoto	DPJ	33.6	LDP gain from DPJ
Hiroshima 5th	Mitsuo Mitani	DPJ	Minoru Terada	LDP	99,842	63.1	50,486	Mitsuo Mitani	DPJ	31.2	LDP gain from DPJ
Hiroshima 6th	Shizuka Kamei	TPJ	Shizuka Kamei	TPJ	91,078	49.0	12,331	Toshifumi Kojima	LDP	42.4	TPJ hold
Hiroshima 7th	Takashi Wada	DPJ	Fumiaki Kobayashi	LDP	93,491	47.5	40,948	Takashi Wada	DPJ	26.7	LDP gain from DPJ
Yamaguchi 1st	Masahiko Kōmura	LDP	Masahiko Kōmura	LDP	133,776	65.9	98,154	Tetsunari Iida	TPJ	17.6	LDP hold
Yamaguchi 2nd	Hideo Hiraoka	DPJ	Nobuo Kishi	LDP	105,760	55.4	52,267	Hideo Hiraoka	DPJ	28.0	LDP gain from DPJ
Yamaguchi 3rd	Takeo Kawamura	LDP	Takeo Kawamura	LDP	107,833	70.8	79,170	Daisuke Nakaya	DPJ	18.8	LDP hold
Yamaguchi 4th	Shinzo Abe	LDP	Shinzo Abe	LDP	118,696	78.2	99,360	Shintaro Zaima	DPJ	12.7	LDP hold

Proportional representation results
Party	Votes	Seats	Rank	Elected member	Constituency	Ratio
LDP	1,210,400 (34.5%)	5	1	Toshifumi Kojima	Hiroshima 6th	86.5%
LDP	1,210,400 (34.5%)	5	1	Toshiko Abe	Okayama 3rd	73.2%
LDP	1,210,400 (34.5%)	5	19	Masayoshi Yoshino		
LDP	1,210,400 (34.5%)	5	20	Mitsuhiro Uesugi		
LDP	1,210,400 (34.5%)	5	21	Michitaka Ikeda		
JRP	622,226 (17.7%)	2	1	Hiromu Nakamaru	Hiroshima 3rd	42.0%
JRP	622,226 (17.7%)	2	1	Daisuke Sakamoto	Hiroshima 7th	41.6%
DPJ	570,764 (16.3%)	2	1	Michiyoshi Yunoki	Okayama 4th	70.5%
DPJ	570,764 (16.3%)	2	1	Keisuke Tsumura	Okayama 2nd	70.2%
Komei	493,800 (14.1%)	2	1	Tetsuo Saito		
Komei	493,800 (14.1%)	2	2	Keigo Masuya		

== Shikoku block ==
2012 Japanese general election in Shikoku block
- 16 December 2012

All 19 seats to the House of Representatives
	Majority party	Minority party	Third party
Party	LDP	JRP	DPJ
Last election	10 seats	New	8 seats
Constituency	12	0	1
PR seats	2	2	1
Total	14	2	2
Seat change	▲4	▲2	▼6
	Fourth party
Party	Komeito
Last election	1 seat
Constituency	0
PR seats	1
Total	1
Seat change	0

Single-member constituency results in Shikoku
Constituency	Previous member		Elected member		Votes	%	Margin	Runner-up		%	Status
Tokushima 1st	Yoshito Sengoku	DPJ	Mamoru Fukuyama	LDP	59,231	53.2	19,829	Yoshito Sengoku	DPJ	35.4	LDP gain from DPJ
Tokushima 2nd	Miho Takai	DPJ	Shunichi Yamaguchi	LDP	68,526	55.7	23,567	Miho Takai	DPJ	36.6	LDP gain from DPJ
Tokushima 3rd	Masazumi Gotoda	LDP	Masazumi Gotoda	LDP	70,197	53.8	19,394	Hirobumi Niki	DPJ	38.9	LDP hold
Kagawa 1st	Junya Ogawa	DPJ	Takuya Hirai	LDP	84,080	47.9	20,966	Junya Ogawa	DPJ	35.9	LDP gain from DPJ
Kagawa 2nd	Yuichiro Tamaki	DPJ	Yuichiro Tamaki	DPJ	79,153	50.0	7,123	Takakazu Seto	LDP	45.5	DPJ hold
Kagawa 3rd	Yoshinori Ohno	LDP	Keitaro Ohno	LDP	85,463	62.7	42,556	Haruhiko Maida	SDP	31.5	LDP hold
Ehime 1st	Yasuhisa Shiozaki	LDP	Yasuhisa Shiozaki	LDP	115,798	51.7	66,416	Takako Nagae	DPJ	22.0	LDP hold
Ehime 2nd	Seiichiro Murakami	LDP	Seiichiro Murakami	LDP	77,078	46.8	28,316	Arata Nishioka	JRP	29.6	LDP hold
Ehime 3rd	Yoichi Shiraishi	DPJ	Toru Shiraishi	LDP	71,033	47.2	28,308	Yoichi Shiraishi	DPJ	28.4	LDP gain from DPJ
Ehime 4th	Koichi Yamamoto	LDP	Koichi Yamamoto	LDP	65,744	43.1	14,309	Fumiki Sakurauchi	JRP	33.8	LDP hold
Kochi 1st	Teru Fukui	LDP	Teru Fukui	LDP	44,027	42.0	18,083	Shu Oishi	DPJ	24.7	LDP hold
Kochi 2nd	Gen Nakatani	LDP	Gen Nakatani	LDP	76,662	73.6	49,149	Yoshihide Okada	JCP	26.4	LDP hold
Kochi 3rd	Yūji Yamamoto	LDP	Yūji Yamamoto	LDP	80,547	71.3	48,120	Yoichi Hashimoto	JCP	28.7	LDP hold

Proportional representation results
Party	Votes	Seats	Rank	Elected member	Constituency	Ratio
LDP	567,193 (30.7%)	2	1	Takakazu Seto	Kagawa 2nd	91.0%
LDP	567,193 (30.7%)	2	14	Yasuji Izuhara		
JRP	394,393 (21.3%)	2	1	Fumiki Sakurauchi	Ehime 4th	78.2%
JRP	394,393 (21.3%)	2	1	Arata Nishioka	Ehime 2nd	63.3%
DPJ	296,914 (16.0%)	1	1	Junya Ogawa	Kagawa 1st	75.1%
Komei	276,907 (15.0%)	1	1	Noritoshi Ishida		

== Kyushu block ==
2012 Japanese general election in Kyushu block
- 16 December 2012

All 59 seats to the House of Representatives
	Majority party	Minority party	Third party
Party	LDP	JRP	DPJ
Last election	20 seats	New	29 seats
Constituency	34	1	0
PR seats	7	4	3
Total	41	5	3
Seat change	▲21	▲5	▼26
	Fourth party	Fifth party	Sixth party
Party	Komeito	SDP	Your
Last election	3 seats	3 seats	0 seats
Constituency	0	1	0
PR seats	3	1	1
Total	3	2	1
Seat change	0	▼1	▲1
	Seventh party	Eighth party	Ninth party
Party	JCP	PNP	TPJ
Last election	1 seat	2 seats	New
Constituency	0	1	0
PR seats	1	0	1
Total	1	1	1
Seat change	0	▼1	▲1

Single-member constituency results in Kyushu
Constituency	Previous member		Elected member		Votes	%	Margin	Runner-up		%	Status
Fukuoka 1st	Ryu Matsumoto	DPJ	Takahiro Inoue	LDP	96,706	48.3	51,692	Hibiki Takeuchi	YP	22.5	LDP gain from DPJ
Fukuoka 2nd	Shuji Inatomi	DPJ	Makoto Oniki	LDP	105,493	43.6	37,134	Shuji Inatomi	DPJ	28.2	LDP gain from DPJ
Fukuoka 3rd	Kazue Fujita	DPJ	Atsushi Koga	LDP	118,299	51.2	60,827	Kazue Fujita	DPJ	24.9	LDP gain from DPJ
Fukuoka 4th	Takaaki Koga	TPJ	Hideki Miyauchi	LDP	86,039	44.7	43,720	Masami Kawano	JRP	22.0	LDP gain from TPJ
Fukuoka 5th	Daizo Kusuda	DPJ	Yoshiaki Harada	LDP	113,155	47.4	56,215	Daizo Kusuda	DPJ	23.8	LDP gain from DPJ
Fukuoka 6th	Kunio Hatoyama	Ind.	Kunio Hatoyama	Ind.	87,705	41.6	40,062	Issei Koga	DPJ	22.6	Ind. hold
Fukuoka 7th	Makoto Koga	LDP	Satoshi Fujimaru	LDP	96,172	53.6	42,525	Kuniyoshi Noda	DPJ	29.9	LDP hold
Fukuoka 8th	Tarō Asō	LDP	Tarō Asō	LDP	146,712	68.4	100,499	Gōsei Yamamoto	DPJ	21.5	LDP hold
Fukuoka 9th	Rintaro Ogata	DPJ	Asahiko Mihara	LDP	97,419	46.0	35,233	Rintaro Ogata	DPJ	29.4	LDP gain from DPJ
Fukuoka 10th	Takashi Kii	DPJ	Kozo Yamamoto	LDP	87,460	41.6	32,420	Takashi Kii	DPJ	26.2	LDP gain from DPJ
Fukuoka 11th	Ryota Takeda	LDP	Ryota Takeda	LDP	86,443	55.9	48,352	Daisuke Hori	JRP	24.6	LDP hold
Saga 1st	Kazuhiro Haraguchi	DPJ	Kazuchika Iwata	LDP	70,547	49.2	7,540	Kazuhiro Haraguchi	DPJ	43.9	LDP gain from DPJ
Saga 2nd	Hiroshi Ogushi	DPJ	Masahiro Imamura	LDP	70,767	50.7	7,559	Hiroshi Ogushi	DPJ	45.3	LDP gain from DPJ
Saga 3rd	Kosuke Hori	LDP	Kosuke Hori	LDP	96,544	78.3	69,721	Katsuhiro Yamaguchi	JCP	21.7	LDP hold
Nagasaki 1st	Yoshiaki Takaki	DPJ	Tsutomu Tomioka	LDP	92,624	48.2	10,536	Yoshiaki Takaki	DPJ	42.7	LDP gain from DPJ
Nagasaki 2nd	Eriko Fukuda	TPJ	Kanji Kato	LDP	93,448	48.2	42,446	Shintaro Okumura	Ind.	26.3	LDP gain from TPJ
Nagasaki 3rd	Masahiko Yamada	TPJ	Yaichi Tanigawa	LDP	69,903	53.5	17,367	Masahiko Yamada	TPJ	40.2	LDP gain from TPJ
Nagasaki 4th	Daisuke Miyajima	DPJ	Seigo Kitamura	LDP	81,771	51.3	27,853	Daisuke Miyajima	DPJ	33.8	LDP gain from DPJ
Kumamoto 1st	Yorihisa Matsuno	JRP	Minoru Kihara	LDP	94,368	46.4	28,173	Yorihisa Matsuno	JRP	32.6	LDP gain from JRP
Kumamoto 2nd	Kenichiro Fukushima	TPJ	Takeshi Noda	LDP	88,744	53.5	55,451	Akiko Honda	YP	20.1	LDP gain from TPJ
Kumamoto 3rd	Tetsushi Sakamoto	LDP	Tetsushi Sakamoto	LDP	95,651	58.7	57,103	Koichi Honda	JRP	23.7	LDP hold
Kumamoto 4th	Hiroyuki Sonoda	JRP	Hiroyuki Sonoda	JRP	102,975	65.9	66,323	Masayoshi Yagami	Ind.	23.5	JRP hold
Kumamoto 5th	Yasushi Kaneko	LDP	Yasushi Kaneko	LDP	90,553	64.5	48,435	Takatoshi Nakashima	SDP	30.0	LDP hold
Oita 1st	Shuji Kira	DPJ	Yoichi Anami	LDP	84,848	39.9	10,258	Shuji Kira	DPJ	35.0	LDP gain from DPJ
Oita 2nd	Yasumasa Shigeno	SDP	Seishirō Etō	LDP	94,666	51.4	47,880	Hajime Yoshikawa	SDP	25.4	LDP gain from SDP
Oita 3rd	Katsuhiko Yokomitsu	DPJ	Takeshi Iwaya	LDP	100,606	50.3	37,657	Katsuhiko Yokomitsu	DPJ	31.5	LDP gain from DPJ
Miyazaki 1st	Hidesaburo Kawamura	DPJ	Shunsuke Takei	LDP	78,392	41.4	35,644	Hidesaburo Kawamura	DPJ	22.6	LDP gain from DPJ
Miyazaki 2nd	Taku Etō	LDP	Taku Etō	LDP	113,432	68.3	72,362	Seiichirō Dōkyū	DPJ	24.7	LDP hold
Miyazaki 3rd	Yoshihisa Furukawa	LDP	Yoshihisa Furukawa	LDP	119,174	81.8	92,641	Kazuhito Raiju	JCP	18.2	LDP hold
Kagoshima 1st	Hiroshi Kawauchi	DPJ	Okiharu Yasuoka	LDP	76,652	45.5	33,860	Hiroshi Kawauchi	DPJ	25.4	LDP gain from DPJ
Kagoshima 2nd	Takeshi Tokuda	LDP	Takeshi Tokuda	LDP	109,744	66.7	64,037	Akashi Uchikoshi	DPJ	27.8	LDP hold
Kagoshima 3rd	Kazuaki Miyaji	LDP	Takeshi Noma	PNP	70,320	45.2	6,151	Kazuaki Miyaji	LDP	41.3	PNP gain from LDP
Kagoshima 4th	Yasuhiro Ozato	LDP	Yasuhiro Ozato	LDP	100,415	66.9	60,581	Inao Minayoshi	DPJ	26.5	LDP hold
Kagoshima 5th	Hiroshi Moriyama	LDP	Hiroshi Moriyama	LDP	107,933	83.1	86,047	Hiroshi Noguchi	JCP	16.9	LDP hold
Okinawa 1st	Mikio Shimoji	PNP	Konosuke Kokuba	LDP	65,233	43.1	18,368	Mikio Shimoji	PNP	30.9	LDP gain from PNP
Okinawa 2nd	Kantoku Teruya	SDP	Kantoku Teruya	SDP	73,498	49.0	18,125	Masahisa Miyazaki	LDP	36.9	SDP hold
Okinawa 3rd	Denny Tamaki	TPJ	Natsumi Higa	LDP	68,523	43.6	11,812	Denny Tamaki	TPJ	36.1	LDP gain from TPJ
Okinawa 4th	Chobin Zukeran	Ind.	Kosaburo Nishime	LDP	72,912	52.2	39,121	Chobin Zukeran	Ind.	24.2	LDP gain from Ind.

Proportional representation results
Party	Votes	Seats	Rank	Elected member	Constituency	Ratio
LDP	1,995,521 (29.9%)	7	1	Kazuaki Miyaji	Kagoshima 3rd	91.3%
LDP	1,995,521 (29.9%)	7	1	Masahisa Miyazaki	Okinawa 2nd	75.3%
LDP	1,995,521 (29.9%)	7	34	Kyoko Nishikawa		
LDP	1,995,521 (29.9%)	7	35	Takeshi Hayashida		
LDP	1,995,521 (29.9%)	7	36	Yuji Shinkai		
LDP	1,995,521 (29.9%)	7	37	Mitsunori Sueyoshi		
LDP	1,995,521 (29.9%)	7	38	Kazuyuki Yukawa		
JRP	1,211,996 (18.2%)	4	1	Yorihisa Matsuno	Kumamoto 1st	70.1%
JRP	1,211,996 (18.2%)	4	2	Masami Kawano	Fukuoka 4th	49.2%
JRP	1,211,996 (18.2%)	4	2	Nariaki Nakayama	Miyazaki 1st	47.5%
JRP	1,211,996 (18.2%)	4	2	Tsuyoshi Yamanouchi	Kagoshima 1st	47.2%
Komei	1,043,528 (15.6%)	3	1	Yasuyuki Eda		
Komei	1,043,528 (15.6%)	3	2	Kiyohiko Toyama		
Komei	1,043,528 (15.6%)	3	3	Masakazu Hamachi		
DPJ	993,317 (14.9%)	3	1	Hiroshi Ogushi	Saga 2nd	89.3%
DPJ	993,317 (14.9%)	3	1	Kazuhiro Haraguchi	Saga 1st	89.3%
DPJ	993,317 (14.9%)	3	1	Yoshiaki Takaki	Nagasaki 1st	88.6%
YP	424,892 (6.4%)	1	1	Masao Sato		
JCP	337,573 (5.1%)	1	1	Seiken Akamine		
SDP	300,708 (4.5%)	1	1	Hajime Yoshikawa	Oita 2nd	49.4%
TPJ	260,994 (3.9%)	1	1	Denny Tamaki	Okinawa 3rd	82.8%

== Leaders' races ==
Results for party leaders
Party	Member	Constituency	Votes	%	Position	Status
LDP	Shinzo Abe	Yamaguchi 4th	118,696	78.2	1st	Re-elected
DPJ	Yoshihiko Noda	Hokkaido 9th	163,334	57.3	1st	Re-elected
JRP	Shintaro Ishihara	Tokyo PR	1,298,309	19.9	1st	Elected
Komei	Natsuo Yamaguchi	House of Councillors				
YP	Yoshimi Watanabe	Tochigi 3rd	84,023	60.3	1st	Re-elected
TPJ	Yukiko Kada	Governor of Shiga				
JCP	Kazuo Shii	Southern Kanto PR	447,890	5.9	1st	Re-elected
SDP	Mizuho Fukushima	House of Councillors				
Daichi	Muneo Suzuki	Did not run				
PNP	Shozaburo Jimi	House of Councillors				

== Closest races ==
Candidates with a narrow loss ratio of over 90%
Constituency	Candidate		Votes	%	Ratio
Saitama 6th	Atsushi Oshima	DPJ	90,673	37.9	99.8
Yamanashi 3rd	Shinichi Nakatani	LDP	50,190	33.3	99.7
Kyoto 3rd	Kenta Izumi	DPJ	58,735	31.5	99.6
Wakayama 1st	Hirofumi Kado	LDP	60,277	34.8	99.5
Tokyo 1st	Banri Kaieda	DPJ	80,879	28.9	98.6
Aichi 13th	Kensuke Onishi	DPJ	97,187	39.7	98.5
Tokyo 3rd	Jin Matsubara	DPJ	102,298	41.3	98.4
Yamagata 3rd	Koichi Kato	LDP	70,303	35.2	98.0
Aichi 5th	Hirotaka Akamatsu	DPJ	65,423	31.1	97.3
Nagano 3rd	Yosei Ide	YP	67,750	26.9	97.0
Osaka 15th	Naokazu Takemoto	LDP	88,500	39.7	96.4
Hyogo 1st	Nobuhiko Isaka	YP	73,587	35.8	96.3
Aichi 3rd	Shoichi Kondo	DPJ	73,927	34.9	95.1
Osaka 4th	Yasuhide Nakayama	LDP	89,894	36.4	94.2
Hokkaido 1st	Takahiro Yokomichi	DPJ	79,994	28.9	93.0
Osaka 8th	Takashi Ōtsuka	LDP	71,091	37.1	93.0
Shiga 3rd	Taizō Mikazuki	DPJ	53,257	34.8	92.1
Osaka 10th	Kiyomi Tsujimoto	DPJ	65,411	33.3	92.0
Kanagawa 16th	Yuichi Goto	DPJ	90,881	37.3	91.8
Kagoshima 3rd	Kazuaki Miyaji	LDP	64,169	41.3	91.3
Kagawa 2nd	Takakazu Seto	LDP	72,030	45.5	91.0
Chiba 1st	Hiroaki Kadoyama	LDP	69,927	30.2	90.9
Shiga 1st	Tatsuo Kawabata	DPJ	60,921	31.6	90.6
Kyoto 6th	Hiroshi Ando	LDP	80,990	30.3	90.3
