= Hikaru Fujita =

Japanese politician (born 1990)

- {藤田 ひかる

Member of the House of Representatives
- Incumbent
- Assumed office 8 February 2026
- Preceded by: Mitsu Shimojo
- Constituency: Nagano 2nd

Personal details
- Born: 25 April 1990 (age 36) Yokohama, Kanagawa, Japan
- Party: Liberal Democratic
- Education: Hitotsubashi University; Harvard University

Hikaru Fujita (藤田ひかる, Fujita Hikaru; born 25 April 1990) is a Japanese politician serving as a member of the House of Representatives since 2026. In the 2025 House of Councillors election, she was a candidate for the House of Councillors.
