= Mitsu Shimojo =

Japanese politician (born 1955)

- 下条 みつ
- Official portrait, 2011

Member of the House of Representatives
- In office 24 October 2017 – 23 January 2026
- Preceded by: Shunsuke Mutai
- Succeeded by: Hikaru Fujita
- Constituency: Nagano 2nd
- In office 10 November 2003 – 16 November 2012
- Preceded by: Jin Murai
- Succeeded by: Shunsuke Mutai
- Constituency: Nagano 2nd

Personal details
- Born: 29 December 1955 (age 70) Matsumoto, Nagano, Japan
- Party: CRA (since 2026)
- Other political affiliations: DPJ (2000–2016); DP (2016–2017); KnT (2017–2018); DPP (2018–2020); CDP (2020–2026)
- Parent: Shin'ichirō Shimojō (father)
- Relatives: Yasumaro Shimojō (grandfather)
- Education: Shinshu University
- Website: 衆議院議員 下条みつ（公式ホームページ）

Mitsu Shimojo (下条 みつ, Shimojō Mitsu; born 29 December 1955) is a Japanese politician of the Democratic Party of Japan, a member of the House of Representatives in the Diet (national legislature). A native of Matsumoto, Nagano and graduate of Shinshu University, he was elected for the first time in 2003 after an unsuccessful run in 2000.
