= Jin Murai =

Japanese politician (born 1937)

- 村井 仁
- Official portrait, 2001

Governor of Nagano Prefecture
- In office 1 September 2006 – 31 August 2010
- Monarch: Akihito
- Preceded by: Yasuo Tanaka
- Succeeded by: Shuichi Abe

Chairman of the National Public Safety Commission
- In office 26 April 2001 – 30 September 2002
- Prime Minister: Junichiro Koizumi
- Preceded by: Bunmei Ibuki
- Succeeded by: Sadakazu Tanigaki

Member of the House of Representatives; from Hokuriku-Shin'etsu
- In office 8 July 1986 – 8 August 2005
- Preceded by: Dai Shiojima
- Succeeded by: Multi-member district
- Constituency: Nagano 4th (1986–1996); Nagano 2nd (1996–2003); PR block (2003–2005)

Personal details
- Born: 28 March 1937 (age 89) Matsumoto, Nagano, Japan
- Party: Liberal Democratic
- Other political affiliations: JRP (1993–1994); NFP (1994–1998)
- Education: University of Tokyo

Jin Murai (村井 仁, Murai Jin; born 28 March 1937) is a former governor of Nagano Prefecture in Japan. After growing up in Matsumoto, Nagano, he graduated from the University of Tokyo in 1959 and entered the Ministry of International Trade and Industry upon graduation. In 1986 he was elected to the House of Representatives in the Diet (national legislature) for the first time. He served six consecutive terms as a member for Nagano No.4 district (1986–1996), Nagano No.2 district (1996–2003) and the national proportional representation block (2003–2005).

Whilst in the Diet he served in various ministerial roles, including as Minister of State for Food Safety, Minister of State for Disaster Management and Chairman of the National Public Safety Commission. In July 2005 he voted against the government's postal reform legislation and subsequently lost the support of the Liberal Democratic Party. He did not nominate to contest the September 2005 general election. In the following year he was elected governor of Nagano Prefecture and served one term.
