= Shunsuke Mutai =

Japanese politician

- 務台 俊介
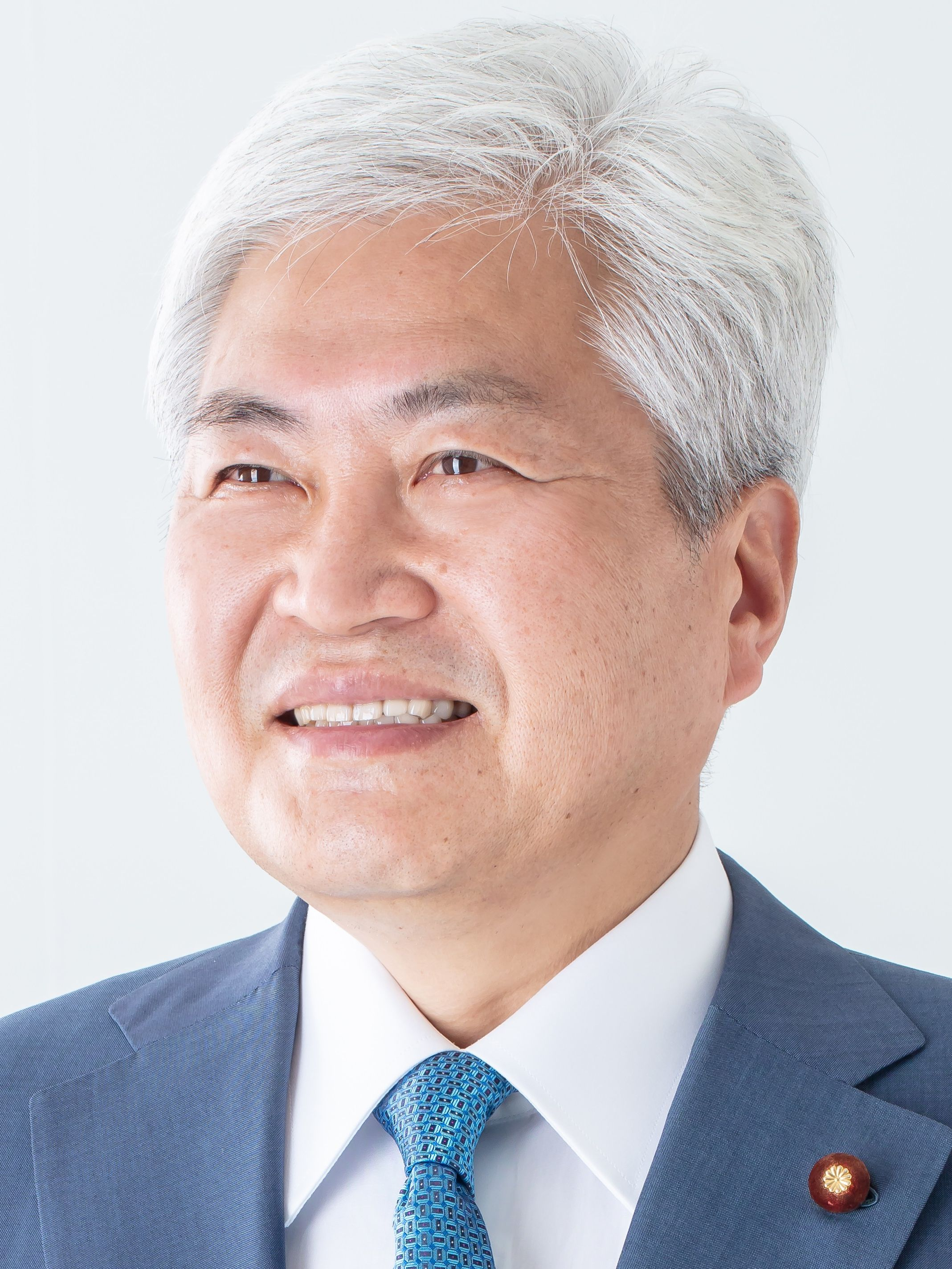
- Official portrait, 2020

Member of the House of Representatives; from Hokuriku-Shin'etsu
- In office 16 December 2012 – 9 October 2024
- Preceded by: Mitsu Shimojo
- Succeeded by: Multi-member district
- Constituency: Nagano 2nd (2012–2017); PR block (2017–2024)

Personal details
- Born: 3 July 1956 (age 69) Misato, Nagano, Japan
- Party: Liberal Democratic
- Education: University of Tokyo

Shunsuke Mutai (務台 俊介, Mutai Shunsuke; born 3 July 1956) is a Japanese politician of the Liberal Democratic Party who served in the House of Representatives in the Diet (national legislature). He was first elected in the 2012 general election. He is a former career bureaucrat in the Ministry of Internal Affairs and Communications (briefly serving as Director of the CLAIR London Office) and graduate of University of Tokyo. Having unsuccessfully contested the Nagano 2nd district in the 2009 general election, he then served as a professor of local administration at Kanagawa University.

Mutai was Secretary to the Alliance of Legislators who wish to legislate for Mountain Day, which was inaugurated in August 2016.

In 2016 Mutai was appointed Parliamentary Vice Minister for Reconstruction and shortly after hit global headlines concerning an incident concerning a ministerial visit to a disaster-hit region. Half year later at a campaign party Mutai joked about the incident only to be criticized by Chief Cabinet Secretary Yoshihide Suga. Mutai resigned from his post on the following day. At the 2017 general election Mutai was defeated in his Nagano constituency but re-elected to the Diet under his party's proportional representation bloc. He was reappointed to government as a State Minister for the Environment in October 2021 but relieved of his position in the August 2022 Kishida reshuffle .
