= Nagano 2nd district =

Legislative district of Japan

Nagano 2nd District
- Parliamentary constituency for the Japanese House of Representatives
- Numbered map of Nagano Prefecture single-member districts
- Prefecture: Nagano
- Proportional District: Hokurikushin'etsu
- Electorate: 381,349

Current constituency
- Created: 1994
- Seats: One
- Party: LDP
- Representative: Hikaru Fujita
- Municipalities: Azumino, Matsumoto, Ōmachi, part of Nagano, Higashichikuma District, Kamiminochi District, and Kitaazumi District

Nagano 2nd district (長野県第2区, Nagano-ken dai-niku or simply 長野2区, Nagano-niku) is a single-member constituency of the House of Representatives in the national Diet of Japan located in Nagano Prefecture.

== List of representatives ==
Election	Representative	Party	Notes
1996	Jin Murai	New Frontier	
2000	Jin Murai	Liberal Democratic	
2003	Mitsu Shimojo	Democratic	
2005	Mitsu Shimojo	Democratic	
2009	Mitsu Shimojo	Democratic	
2012	Shunsuke Mutai	Liberal Democratic	
2014	Shunsuke Mutai	Liberal Democratic	
2017	Mitsu Shimojo	Kibō no Tō	
2021	Mitsu Shimojo	CDP	
2024	Mitsu Shimojo	CDP	
2026	Hikaru Fujita	LDP	

== Election results ==
2026
Party	Candidate	Votes	%	±%
LDP	Hikaru Fujita	104,107	46.74	▲20.13
Centrist Reform	Mitsu Shimojo (incumbent)	75,809	34.04	▼14.5
Ishin	Daisuke Tezuka	24,414	10.96	▼14.03
Sanseitō	Hiroyoshi Takeshita	18,383	8.25	
Turnout		222,713	60.80	▲4.84
LDP gain from Centrist Reform				

2024
Party	Candidate	Votes	%	±%
CDP	Mitsu Shimojo (Incumbent)	98,664	48.39	▲0.87
LDP	Shunsuke Mutai	54,265	26.61	▼5.71
Ishin	Daisuke Tezuka	50,961	24.99	▲4.83
Turnout		203,890	55.96	▼1.08
CDP hold				

2021
Party	Candidate	Votes	%	±%
CDP	Mitsu Shimojo (Incumbent)	101,391	47.52	New
Liberal Democratic	Shunsuke Mutai (Incumbent-Hokurikushin'etsu PR block) (reelected by Hokurikushin'etsu PR block)	68,958	32.32	▲1.89
Innovation	Daisuke Tezuka	43,026	20.16	▲4.74
Registered electors		382,082		
Turnout			57.04	▼1.43
CDP hold				

2017
Party	Candidate	Votes	%	±%
Kibō no Tō	Mitsu Shimojo	78,343	35.47	New
Liberal Democratic	Shunsuke Mutai (Incumbent) (elected by Hokurikushin'etsu PR block)	67,210	30.43	▼6.59
Social Democratic	Hiroshi Nakagawa	41,274	18.68	▲12.13
Innovation	Daisuke Tezuka	34,073	15.42	New
Registered electors		388,839		
Turnout			58.47	▲4.14
Kibō no Tō gain from LDP				

2014
Party	Candidate	Votes	%	±%
Liberal Democratic	Shunsuke Mutai (Incumbent)	75,718	37.02	▼2.47
Democratic	Mitsu Shimojo	63,558	31.08	▲3.81
Innovation	Tomoyuki Momose (Incumbent-Hokurikushin'etsu PR block)	41,232	20.16	New
Communist	Tatsuya Kiyosawa	24,006	11.74	▲0.44
Registered electors		384,529		
Turnout			54.33	▼8.43
LDP hold				

2012
Party	Candidate	Votes	%	±%
Liberal Democratic	Shunsuke Mutai	93,092	39.49	▲11.57
Democratic	Mitsu Shimojo (Incumbent)	64,278	27.27	▼28.62
Restoration	Tomoyuki Momose (elected by Hokurikushin'etsu PR block)	49,489	20.99	New
Communist	Masahiro Kitamura	26,626	11.30	▲4.77
Happiness Realization	Junji Ajioka	2,239	0.95	▲0.20
Registered electors		386,742		
Turnout			62.76	▼11.71
LDP gain from Democratic				

2009
Party	Candidate	Votes	%	±%
Democratic	Mitsu Shimojo (Incumbent)	158,666	55.89	▲9.15
Liberal Democratic	Shunsuke Mutai	79,267	27.92	▼4.52
Social Democratic	Hiroshi Nakagawa	18,603	6.55	▼5.04
Communist	Masaaki Kishino	18,529	6.53	▲0.14
Independent	Shotaro Kamijo	6,682	2.35	New
Happiness Realization	Honami Ōtsuki	2,118	0.75	New
Registered electors		387,779		
Turnout			74.47	▲4.46
Democratic hold				

2005
Party	Candidate	Votes	%	±%
Democratic	Mitsu Shimojo (Incumbent)	124,973	46.74	▲3.73
Liberal Democratic	Riki Sekiya	86,735	32.44	▼6.74
Social Democratic	Wakako Yamaguchi	30,991	11.59	▲0.93
Communist	Masaaki Kishino	17,081	6.39	▼0.77
Independent	Hideko Tōjo	7,591	2.84	New
Registered electors		389,698		
Turnout			70.01	▲4.01
Democratic hold				

2003
Party	Candidate	Votes	%	±%
Democratic	Mitsu Shimojo	108,397	43.01	▲10.35
Liberal Democratic	Jin Murai (Incumbent) (elected by Hokurikushin'etsu PR block)	98,756	39.18	▲1.19
Social Democratic	Wakako Yamaguchi (Incumbent-Hokurikushin'etsu PR block)	26,865	10.66	▼7.56
Communist	Keiji Shimizu	18,038	7.16	▼3.97
Registered electors		388,988		
Turnout			66.00	▼0.50
Democratic gain from LDP				

2000
Party	Candidate	Votes	%	±%
Liberal Democratic	Jin Murai (Incumbent)	95,046	37.99	▲12.38
Democratic	Mitsu Shimojo	81,710	32.66	New
Social Democratic	Wakako Yamaguchi (elected by Hokurikushin'etsu PR block)	45,584	18.22	▲6.38
Communist	Keiji Shimizu	27,858	11.13	▲0.53
Turnout			66.50	
LDP hold				

1996
Party	Candidate	Votes	%	±%
New Frontier	Jin Murai	122,483	51.94	New
Liberal Democratic	Yūnai Mochizuki	60,399	25.61	New
Social Democratic	Seikō Kitazawa (elected by Hokurikushin'etsu PR block)	27,930	11.84	New
Communist	Keiji Shimizu	24,990	10.60	New
Turnout				
