= Nozomu Suzuki =

Japanese politician (1949–2024)

- 鈴木 望

Member of the House of Representatives
- In office 21 December 2012 – 21 November 2014
- Constituency: Tōkai PR

Mayor of Iwata
- In office 24 April 2005 – 23 April 2009
- Preceded by: Himself
- Succeeded by: Osamu Watanabe
- In office 28 August 1998 – 31 March 2005
- Preceded by: Shige Yamashita
- Succeeded by: Himself

Personal details
- Born: 20 April 1949 Toyoda, Shizuoka, Japan
- Died: 7 June 2024 (aged 75) Hamamatsu, Shizuoka, Japan
- Party: Restoration (2012–2014)
- Other political affiliations: Independent (1998–2012); JIP 2014 (2014–2016); JIP 2016 (2016–2017); KnT (2017)
- Education: Hitotsubashi University

Nozomu Suzuki (Japanese: 鈴木望; 20 April 1949 – 7 June 2024) was a Japanese politician. A member of the Japan Restoration Party, he served in the House of Representatives from 2012 to 2014.

Suzuki died in Hamamatsu on 7 June 2024, at the age of 75.
