= Kazuyuki Yukawa =

Japanese politician (1949–2025)

- 湯川 一行

Member of the House of Representatives
- In office 16 December 2012 – 14 December 2014
- Constituency: Kyushu PR

Personal details
- Born: 15 August 1949 Kagoshima Prefecture, Japan
- Died: 4 April 2025 (aged 75) Izumi, Kagoshima, Japan
- Party: Liberal Democratic
- Education: Nihon University

Kazuyuki Yukawa (Japanese: 湯川一行 Yukawa Kazuyuki; 15 August 1949 – 4 April 2025) was a Japanese politician. A member of the Liberal Democratic Party, he served in the House of Representatives from 2012 to 2014.

Yukawa died of aspiration pneumonia in Izumi, on 4 April 2025, at the age of 75.
