= Susumu Hamamura =

Japanese politician

- 濱村 進
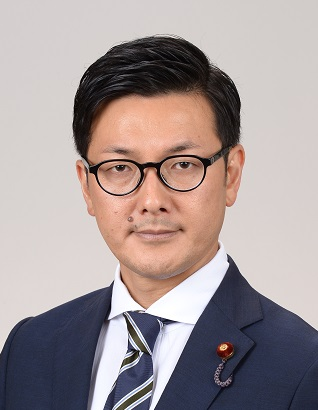
- Official portrait, 2014

Member of the House of Representatives
- In office 16 December 2012 – 14 October 2021
- Constituency: Kinki PR

Personal details
- Born: 30 September 1975 (age 51) Kurashiki, Okayama, Japan
- Party: Komeito
- Education: Kwansei Gakuin University

Susumu Hamamura (Japanese: 濱村 進, Hepburn: Hamamura Susumu; born 30 September 1975) is a member of Komeito serving in the Japanese House of Representatives, a position that he has been elected to two times. He is supportive of casinos in Japan, saying that they will help the economy and "will give foreigners something to do at night".
