= Yasushi Adachi =

Japanese politician

- 足立 康史
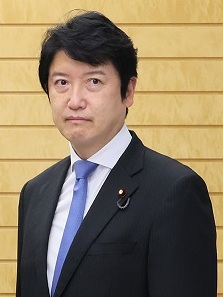
- Adachi in 2021

Member of the House of Councillors
- Incumbent
- Assumed office 29 July 2025
- Constituency: National PR

Member of the House of Representatives
- In office 17 December 2012 – 9 October 2024
- Preceded by: Nobumori Ōtani
- Succeeded by: Kei Hagihara
- Constituency: Osaka 9th (2012–2014); Kinki PR (2014–2021); Osaka 9th (2021–2024)

Personal details
- Born: 14 October 1965 (age 60) Izumiōtsu, Osaka, Japan
- Party: DPP (since 2025)
- Other political affiliations: Your Party (2011–2012); Restoration (2012–2014); Innovation (2014–2016); Ishin (2016–2024); Independent (2024–2025)
- Children: 1
- Education: Osaka Ibaraki High School
- Alma mater: Kyoto University; Columbia University

Yasushi Adachi (Japanese: 足立康史, romanized: Adachi Yasushi; born 14 October 1965) is Japanese politician, and a member of the Democratic Party for the People. He is currently serving as a member of the House of Councilors, and has served as a member of the House of Representatives, having been elected three times—in 2012, 2014, and 2021.

After the 2021 House of Representatives election, Adachi was appointed by co-party leader Baba Nobuyuki as Chairperson of the Diet Caucus Policy Affairs Research Council, effectively making him the leader of all policy affairs within the party. Adachi advocates for making free education a constitutional right, arguing that it could help slow the decline in birthrate.

== Early life ==
Yasushi Adachi was born in Izumiotsu, Osaka Prefecture and grew up in Ibaraki, Osaka Prefecture. After graduating from Osaka Ibaraki High School, he went on to Kyoto University, where he received both his Bachelor's and Master's degrees in Civil Engineering. In 1990, he joined the Ministry of International Trade and Industry (MITI). In 1998, he received his Master's degree in Public administration from Columbia University. In 2013, he retired from the Ministry after the Great East Japan Earthquake.

== Political career ==
Adachi was first elected to the House of Representatives in the 46th general election, running for the Japan Restoration Party in Osaka 9th district (Japanese: 大阪府第9区).

Following a split within the JRP, over policy differences between the right-winged faction led by former Tokyo Governor Shintaro Ishihara and the moderate Osaka Governor Toru Hashimoto, Adachi joined the Hashimoto-led Japan Innovation Party (a merger with the centre-left Unity Party/Yui-no-To, led by Kenji Eda), alongside most of his peers in Osaka.

In the 47th general election for the House of Representatives, Adachi was defeated by Kenji Harada (Japanese: 原田憲治) of the Liberal Democratic Party, and was resurrected and elected from Kinki proportional representation block.

Upon the split within the JIP, caused by differences over electoral pact negotiation with the centre-left Democratic Party of Japan, Adachi once again joined the anti-coalition party, Initiatives from Osaka (おおさか維新の会/ Osaka Ishin-No-Kai), led by Toru Hashimoto. Initiatives from Osaka is renamed Nippon Ishin-No-Kai (日本維新の会) while the pro-coalition faction led by Kenji Eda merged with the Democratic Party of Japan, the predecessor to the Constitutional Democratic Party.

In the 48th general election for the House of Representatives in 2017, he was again narrowly defeated by Harada, this time by about 2,000 votes, and was resurrected and re-elected from the Kinki proportional representation block.

In the 49th general election for the House of Representatives in 2021, he defeated his rival Harada by about 50,000 votes, in a 19.6-point swing a margin large enough to ensure Harada was not resurrected and re-elected on proportional votes.
