= Go Shinohara =

Japanese politician (born 1975)

- 篠原 豪
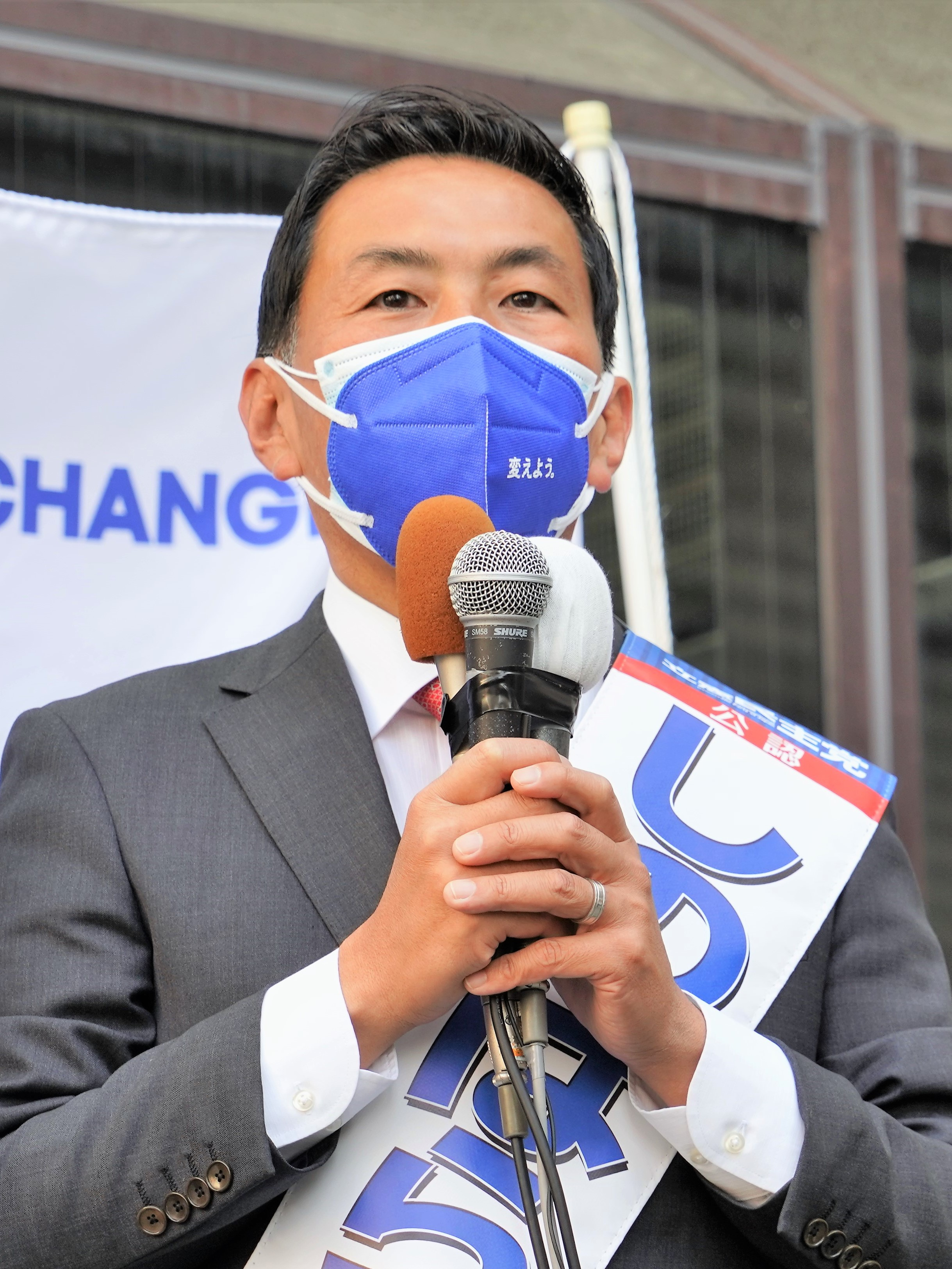
- Shinohara in 2021

Member of the House of Representatives; from Southern Kanto
- In office 19 December 2014 – 23 January 2026
- Preceded by: Multi-member district
- Succeeded by: Natsuko Maruo
- Constituency: PR block (2014–2021); Kanagawa 1st (2021–2026)

Member of the Yokohama City Council
- In office 2011–2014
- Constituency: Kanazawa Ward

Personal details
- Born: 12 February 1975 (age 51) Isogo, Yokohama, Japan
- Party: CRA (since 2026)
- Other political affiliations: Your Party (2011–2013); Unity (2013–2014); JIP (2014–2016); DP (2016–2017); CDP (2017–2026)
- Education: Waseda University

Go Shinohara (Japanese: 篠原豪, Hepburn: Shinohara Go; born 12 February 1975) is a Japanese politician serving as a member of the House of Representatives since 2014. From 2011 to 2014, he was a member of the Yokohama City Council.
