= Jun Matsumoto (politician) =

Japanese politician (1950–2026)

- 松本 純
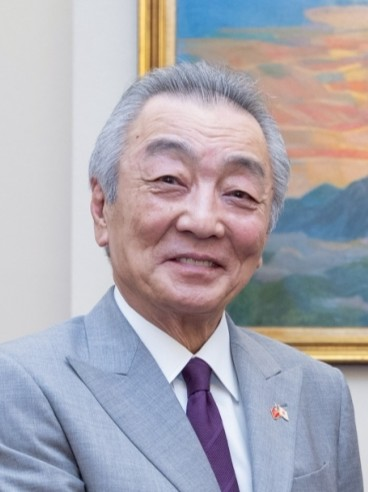
- Matsumoto in 2025

Chairman of the National Public Safety Commission
- In office August 3, 2016 – August 3, 2017
- Prime Minister: Shinzo Abe
- Preceded by: Taro Kono
- Succeeded by: Hachiro Okonogi

Deputy Chief Cabinet Secretary (Political affairs, House of Representatives)
- In office September 24, 2008 – September 16, 2009
- Prime Minister: Tarō Asō
- Preceded by: Ryū Shionoya
- Succeeded by: Yorihisa Matsuno

Member of the House of Representatives; from Southern Kanto
- In office November 10, 2003 – October 14, 2021
- Preceded by: Kenichiro Sato
- Succeeded by: Gō Shinohara
- Constituency: Kanagawa 1st (2003–2009); PR block (2009–2012); Kanagawa 1st (2012–2021); PR block (2009–2012)
- In office October 21, 1996 – June 2, 2000
- Preceded by: Constituency established
- Succeeded by: Kenichiro Sato
- Constituency: Kanagawa 1st

Member of the Yokohama City Council
- In office 1990–1996
- Constituency: Naka Ward

Personal details
- Born: April 11, 1950 Yokohama, Kanagawa, Japan
- Died: March 19, 2026 (aged 75) Tokyo, Japan
- Party: Liberal Democratic (1990–2021; 2022–2026)
- Other political affiliations: Independent (2021–2022)
- Education: Tokyo University of Pharmacy and Life Sciences

Jun Matsumoto (松本 純, Matsumoto Jun; August 11, 1950 – March 19, 2026) was a Japanese politician of the Liberal Democratic Party, who served as a member of the House of Representatives in the Diet (national legislature).

== Early life ==
Matsumoto was a native of Yokohama, Kanagawa and graduated from Tokyo University of Pharmacy and Life Sciences.

He worked at the Japanese pharmaceutical company SSP Co., Ltd. from 1974 to 1978 and then at the pharmacy called 松本薬局 (Matsumoto Yakkoku) from 1978 to 2003.

== Political career ==
Matsumoto was elected to the first of his three terms in the assembly of Yokohama in 1990, and then to the House of Representatives for the first time in 1996.

=== Scandal ===
On January 18, 2021, 10 days after the declaration of state emergency due to COVID-19, Matsumoto was spotted violating lockdown rules by visiting a restaurant and two hostess bars at night. Additionally, he first affirmed having been there alone and only met the establishment's manager, before admitting he was accompanied by fellow governing party officials Takashi Otsuka and Taido Tanose whom he had invited, and by female staff of the hostess bars.

== Death ==
Matsumoto died from stomach cancer on March 19, 2026, at the age of 75.

== Sources ==
- 政治家情報 〜松本 純〜. www.senkyo.janjan.jp ザ･選挙 (in Japanese). JANJAN. Archived from the original on October 25, 2007.
