= Naoki Furukawa =

Japanese politician

- 古川 直季
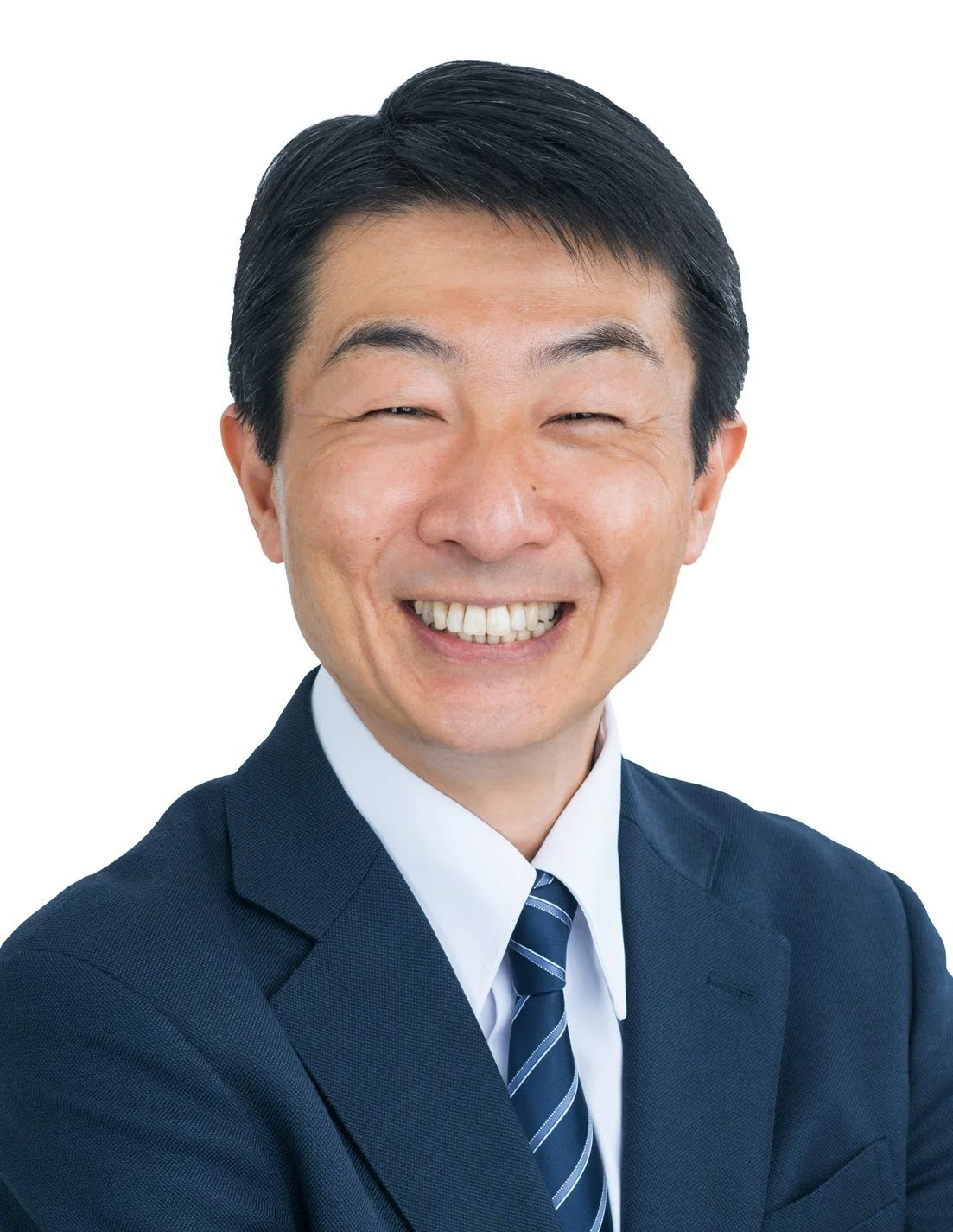
- Official portrait, 2021

Member of the House of Representatives
- Incumbent
- Assumed office 1 November 2021
- Preceded by: Yoichiro Aoyagi
- Constituency: Kanagawa 6th (2021-2024); PR block (2024–2026); Kanagawa 6th (2026–present)

Member of the Yokohama City Council
- In office 1995–2021
- Constituency: Asahi Ward

Personal details
- Born: 31 August 1968 (age 58) Asahi, Yokohama, Kanagawa, Japan
- Party: Liberal Democratic
- Other political affiliations: New Frontier (until 1996)
- Education: Meiji University
- Website: Naoki Furukawa website

Naoki Furukawa (古川 直季, Furukawa Naoki; born 31 August 1968) is a Japanese politician of the Liberal Democratic Party, who serves as a member of the House of Representatives.

== Early years ==
Furukawa was born in Asahi Ward, Yokohama, Kanagawa Prefecture. After graduating from the School of Political Science and Economics of Meiji University, he entered Bank of Yokohama. After that, he worked as a secretary to Shigefumi Matsuzawa.

== Political career ==
In 1995, Furukawa ran for the Yokohama City Council as a New Frontier Party (NFP) candidate and won. After the NFP was dissolved, he joined the LDP.

In Kanagawa 6th district — which includes Asahi Ward, where Furukawa had been active — the LDP had long refrained from fielding its own candidate due to an electoral cooperation agreement with its coalition partner, Komeito. However, Komeito faced difficulties in maintaining its nomination after Kiyohiko Toyama, their intended candidate, resigned from the party following a scandal. As a result, the LDP decided to field a candidate in the Kanagawa 6th district for the first time in 25 years. Following an open recruitment process, Furukawa was selected as the nominee. On 15 April 2021, Furukawa assumed the head of the LDP Kanagawa 6th district branch.

In the 2021 general election, Furukawa defeated incumbent Yoichiro Aoyagi (CDP).

In the 2024 general election, Furukawa lost to Aoyagi by 926 votes but won a seat in the PR block.

In November 2024, Furukawa was appointed to Parliamentary Vice-Minister for Internal Affairs and Communications in Second Ishiba cabinet.

In October 2025, Furukawa was appointed to Parliamentary Vice-Minister for Reconstruction and Parliamentary Vice-Minister of Cabinet Office in First Takaichi cabinet.

In the 2026 general election, Furukawa defeated CRA's Aoyagi by large margin and regained Kanagawa 6th's seat. After the election, he was re-appointed to Parliamentary Vice-Minister for Reconstruction and Parliamentary Vice-Minister of Cabinet Office in Second Takaichi cabinet.
