= Chiba 2nd district =

Electoral constituency in Chiba Prefecture, Japan

- Parliamentary constituency for the Japanese House of Representatives
- Numbered map of the Chiba Prefecture single seats
- Prefecture: Chiba
- Proportional District: Southern Kanto
- Electorate: 318,604

Current constituency
- Created: 1994
- Seats: One
- Party: LDP
- Representatives: Takayuki Kobayashi
- Municipalities: Hanamigawa-ku of Chiba, Yachiyo

Chiba 2nd district (千葉県第2区, Chiba-ken dai-niku or simply 千葉2区, Chiba-niku) is a single-member constituency of the House of Representatives in the national Diet of Japan located in Chiba Prefecture.

== Areas covered ==
=== Since 2022 ===
- Part of Chiba city
  - Hanamigawa-ku
- Yachiyo

=== 1994 - 2022 ===
- Part of Chiba city
  - Hanamigawa-ku
- Narashino
- Yachiyo

== List of representatives ==
Election	Representative	Party	Notes
1996	Kazuo Eguchi	LDP	
2000	Hisayasu Nagata	Democratic	
2003	Hisayasu Nagata	Democratic	
2005	Akiko Yamanaka	LDP	
2009	Yū Kuroda	Democratic	
2009	Yū Kuroda	PLF	
2009	Yū Kuroda	Tomorrow	
2012	Takayuki Kobayashi	LDP	
2014	Takayuki Kobayashi	LDP	
2017	Takayuki Kobayashi	LDP	
2021	Takayuki Kobayashi	LDP	
2024	Takayuki Kobayashi	LDP	
2026	Takayuki Kobayashi	LDP	

== Election results ==
=== 2026 ===
2026
Party	Candidate	Votes	%	±%
LDP	Takayuki Kobayashi (Incumbent)	107,933	67.5	▼0.7
Centrist Reform	Yumi Satō	37,293	23.3	
JCP	Chiyo Shiraishi	14,761	9.2	▼22.7
Registered electors		318,118		
Turnout			51,73	▲0.79
LDP hold				

=== 2024 ===
2024
Party	Candidate	Votes	%	±%
LDP	Takayuki Kobayashi (Incumbent)	103,690	68.13	▲6.09
JCP	Chiyo Shiraishi	48,500	31.87	▲22.12
Majority		55,190	36.26	
Registered electors		317,606		
Turnout			50.94	▼3.71
LDP hold				

=== 2021 ===
2021
Party	Candidate	Votes	%	±%
LDP	Takayuki Kobayashi (Incumbent)	153,017	62.04	▲13.23
CDP	Yū Kuroda	69,583	28.21	New
JCP	Satoshi Terao	24,052	9.75	▲2.36
Majority		83,434	33.83	
Registered electors		460,509		
Turnout			54.65	▲4.07
LDP hold				

=== 2017 ===
2017
Party	Candidate	Votes	%	±%
LDP	Takayuki Kobayashi (Incumbent)	108,964	48.81	▼5.42
CDP	Hiroyasu Higuchi	54,035	24.20	New
Kibō no Tō	Yumiko Takegahara	28,878	12.94	New
JCP	Hirotsugu Ueno	16,491	7.39	▼12.55
Ishin	Kenta Fujimaki	14,885	6.66	New
Majority		54,929	24.61	
Registered electors		449,998		
Turnout			50.58	▼1.81
LDP hold				

=== 2014 ===
2014
Party	Candidate	Votes	%	±%
LDP	Takayuki Kobayashi (Incumbent)	118,592	54.23	▲13.89
Innovation	Kenta Fujimaki	56,479	25.83	New
JCP	Minoru Komatsu	43,622	19.94	▲12.88
Majority		62,113	28.40	
Registered electors		432,033		
Turnout			52.39	▼7.44
LDP hold				

=== 2012 ===
2012
Party	Candidate	Votes	%	±%
LDP	Takayuki Kobayashi	100,551	40.34	▲7.17
Restoration	Toshihiro Nakata	54,123	21.71	New
Democratic	Hiroyasu Higuchi	46,883	18.81	▼38.28
Tomorrow	Yū Kuroda (Incumbent)	30,122	12.08	New
JCP	Toshiyuki Irisawa	17,604	7.06	▼1.13
Majority		46,428	18.63	
Registered electors		428,687		
Turnout			59.83	▼4.82
LDP gain from Tomorrow				

=== 2009 ===
2009
Party	Candidate	Votes	%	±%
Democratic	Yū Kuroda	153,745	57.09	▲14.45
LDP	Akiko Yamanaka (Incumbent)	89,311	33.17	▼13.74
JCP	Chuhei Ogura	22,052	8.19	▲1.96
Happiness Realization	Tomoyasu Yashiro	4,174	1.55	New
Majority		64,434	23.92	
Registered electors		425,033		
Turnout			64.65	▲0.19
Democratic gain from LDP				

=== 2005 ===
2005
Party	Candidate	Votes	%	±%
LDP	Akiko Yamanaka	124,261	46.91	▲6.31
Democratic	Hisayasu Nagata (Incumbent) (Won PR seat)	112,943	42.64	▼5.73
JCP	Ken Sato	16,497	6.23	▼1.88
Social Democratic	Shigeo Wakamatsu	8,772	3.31	▲0.39
Independent	Wao Wakimoto	2,401	0.91	New
Majority		11,318	4.27	
Registered electors		417,798		
Turnout			64.46	▲7.23
LDP gain from Democratic				

=== 2003 ===
2003
Party	Candidate	Votes	%	±%
Democratic	Hisayasu Nagata (Incumbent)	111,539	48.37	▲14.18
LDP	Kazuo Eguchi	93,617	40.60	▲10.10
JCP	Makoto Nakajima	18,703	8.11	▼5.31
Social Democratic	Shigeo Wakamatsu	6,724	2.92	New
Majority		17,922	7.77	
Registered electors		413,315		
Turnout			57.23	▼4.31
Democratic hold				

=== 2000 ===
2000
Party	Candidate	Votes	%	±%
Democratic	Hisayasu Nagata	82,074	34.19	New
LDP	Kazuo Eguchi (Incumbent)	73,197	30.50	▼6.60
Komeito	Shigeyuki Tomita	47,322	19.72	New
JCP	Toshio Nakamura	32,216	13.42	▼2.15
Liberal League	Tadatsugu Kudo	5,216	2.17	▲1.04
Majority		8,877	3.69	
Registered electors		397,893		
Turnout			61.54	
Democratic gain from LDP				

=== 1996 ===
1996
Party	Candidate	Votes	%	±%
LDP	Kazuo Eguchi	75,939	37.10	New
New Frontier	Wahei Nakamura	60,401	29.51	New
Democratic	Takehiro Morishima	34,172	16.69	New
JCP	Shigeo Amaki	31,862	15.57	New
Liberal League	Tatsuyoshi Kawamoto	2,320	1.13	New
Majority		15,538	7.59	
Registered electors				
Turnout				
LDP win (new seat)				
