= Kanagawa 8th district =

Legislative district of Japan

Kanagawa 8th District
- Parliamentary constituency for the Japanese House of Representatives
- A map of the House of Representatives constituencies in Yokohama
- Prefecture: Kanagawa
- Proportional District: Southern Kanto
- Electorate: 410,262

Current constituency
- Created: 1994
- Party: LDP
- Representative: Hidehiro Mitani
- Municipalities: Midori and Aoba wards of Yokohama

Kanagawa 8th district (Kanagawa 8-ku, 神奈川8区) or more formally the "8th district of Kanagawa Prefecture" (Kanagawa-ken dai-8-ku, 神奈川県第8区) is a single-member electoral district for the House of Representatives, the lower house of the National Diet of Japan. It is located in northwestern Yokohama the capital of Kanagawa prefecture. The district covers the wards of Midori and Aoba. As of 2023, the district had 410,262 eligible voters.

Before the 2002 redistricting, i.e. until the 2003 general House of Representatives election, the 8th district consisted of Aoba ward and the Miyamae ward of Kawasaki City, the second major city in Kanagawa. Midori had previously been part of the 7th district, Miyamae was transferred to the newly created 18th district.

After the introduction of single-member districts with the 1994 Japanese electoral reform, effective in the 1996 Representatives election, the district was initially won by pre-reform 1st district incumbent Hiroshi Nakada (New Frontier Party later independent), who resigned for his successful campaign in the 2002 mayoral election in Yokohama city and later returned to the House of Representatives, but this time from Hokuriku-Shin'etsu. The resulting special election in Kanagawa 8th district was won by independent Kenji Eda. Eda lost the district in the 2003 Representatives election to Democrat Tetsundo Iwakuni, but won it back in 2005 and has held onto the seat since.

== List of representatives ==
Representative	Party	Dates	Notes
Hiroshi Nakada	NFP	1996–2000	Previously member from the four-member 1st district for Japan New Party→New Frontier Party, joined "Independents" (Mushozoku no kai) after the NFP dissolution
Hiroshi Nakada	Independent	2000–2002	Resigned, elected mayor of Yokohama in 2002
Kenji Eda	Independent	2002–2003	Special election October 28, 2002
Tetsundo Iwakuni	DPJ	2003–2005	
Kenji Eda	Independent	2005–2009	Formed YP in 2009
Kenji Eda	Your Party	2009–2014	Led breakaway Unity Party in 2013, merged into Japan Innovation Party in 2014
Kenji Eda	Innovation	2014–2017	
Kenji Eda	Independent	2017–2021	
Kenji Eda	CDP	2021–2026	
Hidehiro Mitani	LDP	2026-	Has had a seat in the PR Block since 2017.

== Election results ==
2026
Party	Candidate	Votes	%	±%
LDP	Hidehiro Mitani	140,717	59.0	▲18.0
Centrist Reform	Kenji Eda	97,671	41.0	▼10.4
Turnout		238,388	60.39	▲1.66
LDP gain from Centrist Reform				

2024
Party	Candidate	Votes	%	±%
CDP	Kenji Eda	119,971	51.4	▼1.2
LDP	Hidehiro Mitani (won seat in Southern Kantō PR block)	95,832	41.1	▼6.3
JCP	Yoshiki Iida	17,558	7.5	
Turnout			58.73	▼0.64
CDP hold				

2021
Party	Candidate	Votes	%	±%
CDP	Kenji Eda	130,925	52.6	▼1.6
LDP	Hidehiro Mitani (won seat in Southern Kantō PR block)	117,963	47.4	▲13.7
Turnout			59.37	▲5.78

2017
Party	Candidate	Votes	%	±%
Independent	Kenji Eda	119,280	54.2	▼0.3
LDP	Hidehiro Mitani (won seat in Southern Kantō PR block)	74,119	33.7	▼0.5
JCP	Rika Katō	21,241	9.6	▼1.7
Fair Party	Tsuneki Ōnishi	5,518	2,5	
Turnout			53.59	▼3.00

2014
Party	Candidate	Votes	%	±%
Ishin	Kenji Eda	116,189	54.5	▲0.4
LDP	Mineyuki Fukuda (won seat in Southern Kantō PR block)	73,032	34.2	▲8.4
JCP	Yasuhisa Wakabayashi	24,024	11.3	▲10.5
Turnout			56.59	▼6.41

2012
Party	Candidate	Votes	%	±%
YP	Kenji Eda	127,294	54.1	▲5.0
LDP (NK)	Mineyuki Fukuda (won seat in Minami-Kantō)	60,643	25.8	▲5.0
DPJ (PNP)	Kumiko Itō	33,769	19.7	new
JCP	Susumu Kugimaru	13,526	5.8	new

2009
Party	Candidate	Votes	%	±%
YP	Kenji Eda	128,753	49.1	▲14.2
DPJ	Makoto Yamazaki (won seat in Minami-Kantō)	74,544	28.4	new
LDP (NK)	Mineyuki Fukuda	54,480	20.8	▼8.6
HRP	Hiroyuki Kojima	4,246	1.6	new

2005
Party	Candidate	Votes	%	±%
I	Kenji Eda	88,098	34.9	▼2.9
DPJ	Tetsundo Iwakuni (won seat in Minami-Kantō)	78,860	31.2	▼7.5
LDP	Mineyuki Fukuda (won seat in Minami-Kantō)	74,399	29.4	new
JCP	Eiji Yamanaka	11,578	4.6	▼0.1
