= Jiro Ono (politician) =

Japanese politician (1953–2026)

- 小野 次郎
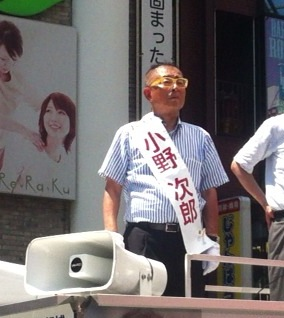
- Ono in 2016

Member of the House of Councillors
- In office 26 July 2010 – 25 July 2016
- Constituency: National PR

Member of the House of Representatives
- In office 11 September 2005 – 21 July 2009
- Constituency: Southern Kanto PR

Personal details
- Born: 7 August 1953 Itabashi, Tokyo, Japan
- Died: 23 October 2026 (aged 73) Kodaira, Tokyo, Japan
- Party: CDP (since 2021)
- Other political affiliations: LDP (2005–2010); Your Party (2010–2013); Unity (2013–2014); JIP (2014–2016); Independent (2016–2021)
- Education: University of Tokyo

Jiro Ono (小野 次郎, Ono Jirō; 7 August 1953 – 23 October 2026) was a Japanese politician of Your Party, and previously the Liberal Democratic Party, who was a member of the House of Councillors and a member of the House of Representatives in the Diet (national legislature). A native of Hokuto, Yamanashi, and graduate of the University of Tokyo, he joined the National Police Agency in 1976, receiving a master's degree in jurisprudence from the University of Angers in France while in the agency. He was elected to the House of Representatives for the first time in the 2005 Japanese general election.

Ono ran in House of Councillors election in 2010 as a proportional candidate of Your Party and won.

Ono died from aspiration pneumonia at a hospital in Kodaira, Tokyo, on 23 October 2026, at the age of 73.

== Sources ==
- 政治家情報 〜小野 次郎〜 [Politician profiles: Jiro Ono]. ザ･選挙 (in Japanese). JANJAN. Archived from the original on 3 December 2007.
