= Osaka 9th district =

- Parliamentary constituency for the Japanese House of Representatives
- Numbered map of the Osaka Prefecture single seats
- Prefecture: Osaka
- Proportional District: Kinki
- Electorate: 373,028

Current constituency
- Created: 1994
- Seats: One
- Party: Ishin
- Representative: Kei Hagihara
- Municipalities: Ibaraki, Minoo, and Toyono District.

Osaka 9th district (大阪府第9区, Osaka-fu dai-kyuku or simply 大阪9区, Osaka-kyuku ) is a single-member constituency of the House of Representatives in the national Diet of Japan located in Osaka Prefecture.

== Areas covered ==
=== Since 2022 ===
- Ibaraki
- Minoo
- Toyono District

=== 1994 - 2022 ===
- Ibaraki
- Ikeda
- Minoo
- Toyono District

== List of representatives ==
Election	Representative	Party	Notes
1996	Takeshi Nishida	New Frontier	
1996	Takeshi Nishida	Liberal	
1996	Takeshi Nishida	New Conservative	
2000	Nobumori Ohtani	Democratic	
2003	Nobumori Ohtani	Democratic	
2005	Takeshi Nishida	LDP	
2006 by-el	Kenji Harada	LDP	
2009	Nobumori Ohtani	Democratic	
2012	Yasushi Adachi	Restoration	
2012	Yasushi Adachi	Innovation	
2014	Kenji Harada	LDP	
2017	Kenji Harada	LDP	
2021	Yasushi Adachi	Ishin	
2024	Kei Hagihara	Ishin	
2026	Kei Hagihara	Ishin	

== Election results ==
=== 2026 ===
2026
Party	Candidate	Votes	%	±%
Ishin	Kei Hagihara	102,204	48.2	▲5.7
LDP	Junpei Higashida (elected in Kinki PR block)	79,259	37.4	▲5.9
Social Democratic	Keigo Nishio	30,493	14.4	▲0.4
Registered electors		372,205		
Turnout			60.24	▲5.45
Ishin hold				

=== 2024 ===
2024
Party	Candidate	Votes	%	±%
Ishin	Kei Hagihara	84,068	42.56	
LDP	Junpei Higashida	62,170	31.48	
Social Democratic	Yumiko Nagasaki	27,617	13.98	
Sanseitō	Makoto Kataoka	19,690	9.97	New
Independent	Kazuya Isobe	3,962	2.01	
Majority		21,898	11.08	
Registered electors		371,440		
Turnout			54.79	▼4.29
Ishin hold				

=== 2021 ===
2021
Party	Candidate	Votes	%	±%
Ishin	Yasushi Adachi	133,146	50.35	
LDP	Kenji Harada	83,776	31.68	
Social Democratic	Yūko Ōtsubaki	42,165	15.94	
Independent	Kazuya Isobe	5,369	2.03	New
Majority		49,370	18.67	
Registered electors		456,232		
Turnout			59.08	▲7.22
Ishin gain from LDP				

=== 2017 ===
2017
Party	Candidate	Votes	%	±%
LDP	Kenji Harada	93,475	40.73	
Ishin	Yasushi Adachi (Won PR seat)	91,438	39.84	New
Social Democratic	Ryoichi Hattori	44,589	19.43	N/A
Majority		2,037	0.89	
Registered electors		453,014		
Turnout			51.86	▼2.37
LDP hold				

=== 2014 ===
2014
Party	Candidate	Votes	%	±%
LDP	Kenji Harada	95,667	41.33	
Innovation	Yasushi Adachi (Won PR seat)	91,400	39.48	New
JCP	Chieko Kakita	31,165	13.46	
Independent	Megumu Tsuji	13,264	5.73	New
Majority		4,267	1.85	
Registered electors		439,169		
Turnout			54.23	
LDP gain from Innovation				

=== 2012 ===
2012
Party	Candidate	Votes	%	±%
Restoration	Yasushi Adachi	104,015	39.83	New
LDP	Kenji Harada (Won PR seat)	89,671	34.34	
Democratic	Nobumori Ohtani	46,550	17.83	
JCP	Kazumi Suetake	20,891	8.00	
Majority		14,344	5.49	
Registered electors				
Turnout				
Restoration gain from Democratic				

=== 2009 ===
2009
Party	Candidate	Votes	%	±%
Democratic	Nobumori Ohtani	150,452	51.00	
LDP	Kenji Harada	97,902	33.19	
JCP	Hiromitsu Murakami	24,281	8.23	
Your	Koichi Yoshino	16,736	5.67	New
Happiness Realization	Rie Fujiki	5,634	1.91	New
Majority		52,550	17.81	
Registered electors				
Turnout				
Democratic gain from LDP				

=== 2006 by-election ===
2006 Osaka 9th district by-election
Party	Candidate	Votes	%	±%
LDP	Kenji Harada	111,226	50.23	
Democratic	Nobumori Ohtani	92,424	41.74	
JCP	Kuniaki Fujiki	17,774	8.03	
Majority		18,802	8.49	
Registered electors				
Turnout				
LDP hold				

=== 2005 ===
2005
Party	Candidate	Votes	%	±%
LDP	Takeshi Nishida	142,243	50.55	
Democratic	Nobumori Ohtani	111,809	39.73	
JCP	Kenji Enami	27,347	9.72	
Majority		30,434	10.82	
Registered electors				
Turnout				
LDP gain from Democratic				

=== 2003 ===
2003
Party	Candidate	Votes	%	±%
Democratic	Nobumori Ohtani	97,572	41.86	
LDP	Takeshi Nishida (Won PR seat)	93,662	40.18	N/A
JCP	Kuniaki Fujiki	21,491	9.22	
Independent	Yoshikazu Nagata	10,678	4.58	New
Social Democratic	Ryutaro Nakakita	9,705	4.16	New
Majority		3,910	1.68	
Registered electors				
Turnout				
Democratic hold				

=== 2000 ===
2000
Party	Candidate	Votes	%	±%
Democratic	Nobumori Ohtani	82,563	36.53	New
New Conservative	Takeshi Nishida	65,469	28.97	New
JCP	Kuniaki Fujiki	38,262	16.93	
Independent	Yasuhira Kimoto	23,071	10.21	New
Independent	Yōichi Matsushita	8,619	3.81	New
Liberal League	Satoshi Wada	8,039	3.56	New
Majority		17,094	7.56	
Registered electors				
Turnout				
Democratic gain from New Conservative				

=== 1996 ===
1996
Party	Candidate	Votes	%	±%
New Frontier	Takeshi Nishida	72,267	33.42	New
LDP	Ken Harada	59,817	27.66	New
JCP	Hitomi Kobayashi	43,316	20.03	New
Democratic	Nobumori Ohtani	34,177	15.81	New
New Socialist	Keiji Kashimoto	6,647	3.07	New
Majority		12,450	5.76	
Registered electors				
Turnout				
New Frontier win (new seat)				
