= Nakatsuka =

Nakatsuka (written: 中塚) is a Japanese surname. Notable people with the surname include:

- Akito Nakatsuka (中塚 章人), Japanese video game composer
- Ikko Nakatsuka (中塚 一宏, born 1965), Japanese politician
