= Kanagawa 1st district =

Legislative district of Japan

- Parliamentary constituency for the House of Representatives
- A map of the House of Representatives constituencies in Yokohama
- Prefecture: Kanagawa
- Proportional District: Southern Kanto
- Electorate: 428,115 (2020)

Current constituency
- Created: 1994
- Number of members: One
- Party: LDP
- Representative: Natsuko Maruo
- Created from: Kanagawa 1st district (1947–1993); Kanagawa 4th district (1975–1993)
- Municipalities: Naka, Isogo and Kanazawa wards in Yokohama

Kanagawa 1st district (神奈川県第1区, Kanagawa-ken dai-ikku or 神奈川1区, Kanagawa ikku) is a single-member constituency of the House of Representatives, the lower house of the national Diet of Japan. It is located in eastern Kanagawa Prefecture and covers the central downtown and southeastern parts of the prefectural capital of Yokohama, namely the Naka (centre), Isogo and Kanazawa wards. It is among many other things home to the Yokohama city hall and the Kanagawa prefectural government building. As of December 1, 2020, 428,115 eligible voters were registered in the district.

Before the electoral reform of the 1990s the area had been split between the four-member 1st district and the five-member 4th district.

In the first post-reform election of 1996, the 1st district was mainly contested by Liberal Democrat Jun Matsumoto (Asō faction), a former member of the city council and newcomer in national politics, Democrat Ken'ichirō Satō (formerly LDP, Fukuda faction, then New Party Sakigake member in the 1990s), an incumbent for the pre-reform 4th district, and newcomer Masahiko Okabe for the New Frontier Party. Matsumoto narrowly won, but Satō kept a seat via the newly introduced proportional representation. In 2000, Satō beat Matsumoto who then also failed to win a proportional seat but retook the 1st district in the 2003 and 2005 general elections. Satō retired from politics in 2007, but in the national landslide Democratic victory of 2009, first time candidate Mieko Nakabayashi won the 1st district against Matsumoto. Matsumoto was Deputy Chief Cabinet Secretary in the Abe cabinet, Satō was chairman of the House of Representatives committee on the environment in the 1990s and chaired the disciplinary committee in 2004.

In the landslide Democratic defeat of 2012, Nakabayashi lost more than 84,000 votes compared to 2009. Matsumoto lost only less than 17,000 votes and regained the district. In February 2021, after it emerged that Matsumoto had visited a club in Ginza during a state of emergency due to the COVID-19 pandemic, he left the LDP and ran as an independent candidate in the 2021 election where he lost to CDP candidate Gō Shinohara.

== List of members representing the district ==
Member	Party	Dates	Electoral history	Notes
Jun Matsumoto	Liberal Democratic	October 21, 1996 – June 2, 2000	Elected in 1996. Lost re-election.	Lost re-election in the Southern Kanto PR block.
Ken'ichirō Satō	Democratic	June 26, 2000 – October 10, 2003	Re-elected in 2000. Lost re-election.	Redistricted from the former 4th district and Re-elected in 1996 by the Southern Kanto PR block. Re-elected in 2003 by the Southern Kanto PR block.
Jun Matsumoto	Liberal Democratic	November 10, 2003 – July 21, 2009	Elected in 2003. Re-elected in 2005. Lost re-election.	Re-elected in 2009 by the Southern Kanto PR block.
Mieko Nakabayashi	Democratic	August 31, 2009 – November 16, 2012	Elected in 2009. Lost re-election.	Lost re-election in the Southern Kanto PR block.
Jun Matsumoto	Liberal Democratic	December 17, 2012 – February 1, 2021	Re-elected in 2012. Re-elected in 2014. Re-elected in 2017. Lost re-election.	
Jun Matsumoto	Independent	February 1, 2021 – October 14, 2021	Re-elected in 2012. Re-elected in 2014. Re-elected in 2017. Lost re-election.	
Gō Shinohara	Constitutional Democratic	October 31, 2021 – 23 January 2026	Re-elected in 2021.	Elected in 2014 by the Southern Kanto PR block. Re-elected in 2017 by the Southern Kanto PR block.
Natsuko Maruo	Liberal Democratic	2026 –		

== Election results ==
=== 2026 ===
2026
Party	Candidate	Votes	%	±%
LDP	Natsuko Maruo	121,899	53.1	▲22.25
Centrist Reform	Gō Shinohara (Incumbent)	80,113	34.9	▼6.21
Ishin	Yoshiharu Asakawa	27,450	12.0	▼0.96
Majority		41,776	18.2	▲7.95
Registered electors		422,826		
Turnout		229,452	56.27	▲1.73
LDP gain from Centrist Reform				

=== 2024 ===
2024
Party	Candidate	Votes	%	±%
CDP	Gō Shinohara	91,809	41.12	▼3.89
LDP (endorsed by Komeito)	Jun Matsumoto	68,931	30.87	
Innovation	Yoshiharu Asakawa	28,841	12.92	▼7.88
Sanseitō	Mamiko Itō	20,110	9.01	New
Communist	Yukio Hasuike	13,572	6.08	New
Majority		22,878	10.25	▼0.57
Registered electors		424,450		
Turnout		223,263	54.54	▲0.55
CDP hold				

=== 2021 ===
General election 2021: Kanagawa's 1st
Party	Candidate	Votes	%
CDP	Gō Shinohara	100,118	45.0
Independent	Jun Matsumoto	76,064	34.2
Ishin	Yoshiharu Asakawa (elected by PR)	46,271	20.8
Total votes		222,453	100.0
CDP gain from Independent			

=== 2017 ===
2017 Japanese general election
Party	Candidate	Votes	%
LDP	Jun Matsumoto	103,070	47.8
CDP	Gō Shinohara (re-elected by PR)	78,019	36.2
Kibō no Tō	Kazuyoshi Nagashima	34,433	16.0
Total votes		215,522	100.0
LDP hold			

=== 2014 ===
2014 Japanese general election
Party	Candidate	Votes	%
LDP	Jun Matsumoto	113,844	52.4
Ishin	Gō Shinohara (elected by PR)	68,061	31.3
JCP	Yukio Akashi	35,465	16.3
Total votes		217,370	100.0
LDP hold			

=== 2012 ===
2012 Japanese general election
Party	Candidate	Votes	%
LDP	Jun Matsumoto	101,238	41.2
Democratic	Mieko Nakabayashi	50,927	20.7
Restoration	Kōichi Matsumoto	41,198	16.8
Your	Yoriyuki Yamashita	36,706	14.9
JCP	Yukio Akashi	15,664	6.4
Total votes		245,733	100.0
LDP gain from Democratic			

=== 2009 ===
2009 Japanese general election
Party	Candidate	Votes	%
Democratic	Mieko Nakabayashi	135,211	48.1
LDP	Jun Matsumoto (re-elected by PR)	117,840	41.9
JCP	Ryōko Kōzai	18,898	6.7
Independent	Seiichi Yamamoto	9,229	3.2
Total votes		281,178	100.0
Democratic gain from LDP			

=== 2005 ===
2005 Japanese general election
Party	Candidate	Votes	%
LDP	Jun Matsumoto	161,702	58.3
Democratic	Ken'ichirō Satō	95,601	34.4
JCP	Osamu Takayama	20,216	7.3
Total votes		277,519	100.0
LDP hold			

=== 2003 ===
2003 Japanese general election
Party	Candidate	Votes	%
LDP	Jun Matsumoto	111,730	47.6
Democratic	Ken'ichirō Satō (re-elected by PR)	97,630	41.6
JCP	Haruko Nakaie	15,331	6.5
Social Democratic	Teizō Hayashi	10,243	4.4
Total votes		234,934	100.0
LDP gain from Democratic			

=== 2000 ===
2000 Japanese general election
Party	Candidate	Votes	%
Democratic	Ken'ichirō Satō	91,578	40.1
LDP	Jun Matsumoto	81,245	35.5
JCP	Takashi Munakata	28,411	12.4
Liberal	Hiroshi Iijima	23,783	10.4
Liberal League	Kiyoshi Matsuda	3,593	1.6
Total votes		228,610	100.0
Democratic gain from LDP			

=== 1996 ===
1996 Japanese general election
Party	Candidate	Votes	%
LDP	Jun Matsumoto	55,360	26.4
Democratic	Ken'ichirō Satō (elected by PR)	54,494	26.0
New Frontier	Masahisa Okabe	50,684	24.2
JCP	Kimiko Tamura	26,686	12.7
Social Democratic	Yumiko Hayashi	22,236	10.6
Total votes		209,460	100.0
LDP win (new seat)			
