= Hisayasu =

- Gender: Male

Origin
- Origin: Japanese
- Meaning: Different meanings depending on the kanji used

Hisayasu (written: 寿保 or 寿康) is a masculine Japanese given name. Notable people with the name include:

- Hisayasu Nagata (永田 寿康; 1969–2009), Japanese politician
- Hisayasu Satō (佐藤 寿保; born 1959), Japanese film director
