= Akiko Yamanaka =

Japanese politician (born 1945)

- 山中 燁子
- Official portrait, 2005

Member of the House of Representatives
- In office 11 September 2005 – 21 July 2009
- Preceded by: Hisayasu Nagata
- Succeeded by: Yū Kuroda
- Constituency: Chiba 2nd
- In office 20 October 1996 – 2 June 2000
- Preceded by: Constituency established
- Succeeded by: Multi-member district
- Constituency: Tōkai PR

Personal details
- Born: 6 November 1945 (age 81) Otaru, Hokkaido, Japan
- Party: Liberal Democratic
- Other political affiliations: New Frontier (1996–1998)
- Education: Tsuda College

Akiko Yamanaka (山中 あき子, Yamanaka Akiko; born 6 November 1945) is a former Japanese politician of the Liberal Democratic Party (LDP), who served as a member of the House of Representatives in the Diet (national legislature). A native of Otaru, Hokkaido and graduate of Tsuda College, she was elected to the House of Representatives for the first time in 1996 and later became a Special Ambassador for Peacebuilding of Japan. She was originally a member of the New Frontier Party but later joined the LDP.

== Career ==
Yamanaka is a Senior Diplomatic Fellow, Cambridge Central Asia Forum and By-fellow of Churchill College, Cambridge University as well as visiting professor at the Graduate School of Hokkaido University, the United Nations University and currently Tenjin Foreign Studies University. She has also been a Senior Visiting Researcher at St. Antony's College, Oxford University and at the Center for Strategic and International Studies.

Yamanaka has served as the Member of the House of Representatives of Japan as well as Parliamentary Vice-Minister for Foreign Affairs, Director of the Committee of Foreign Affairs, Director General of the Women's Bureau of Liberal Democratic Party, etc. Her areas of expertise include International Peacebuilding and Preventive State Theory, International Negotiation and Strategic Studies, and Intercultural Studies. On these and other subjects, she has written and lectured extensively and internationally. She has published many books such as “Think, or Sink: Preventive State Theory”, “Toward the Future: Human Security”, “From the Window of Oxford”, etc. She was awarded by OISCA for ‘Contribution to Asia’ and Soroptimist Japan for ‘International Contribution’.

She has worked on Human Development for Peacebuilding, and on Human Security, especially water security, food security and energy security as well as on Natural and Human Induced Disaster Prevention and Mitigation.
