= Kenji Eda =

Japanese politician

- 江田 憲司
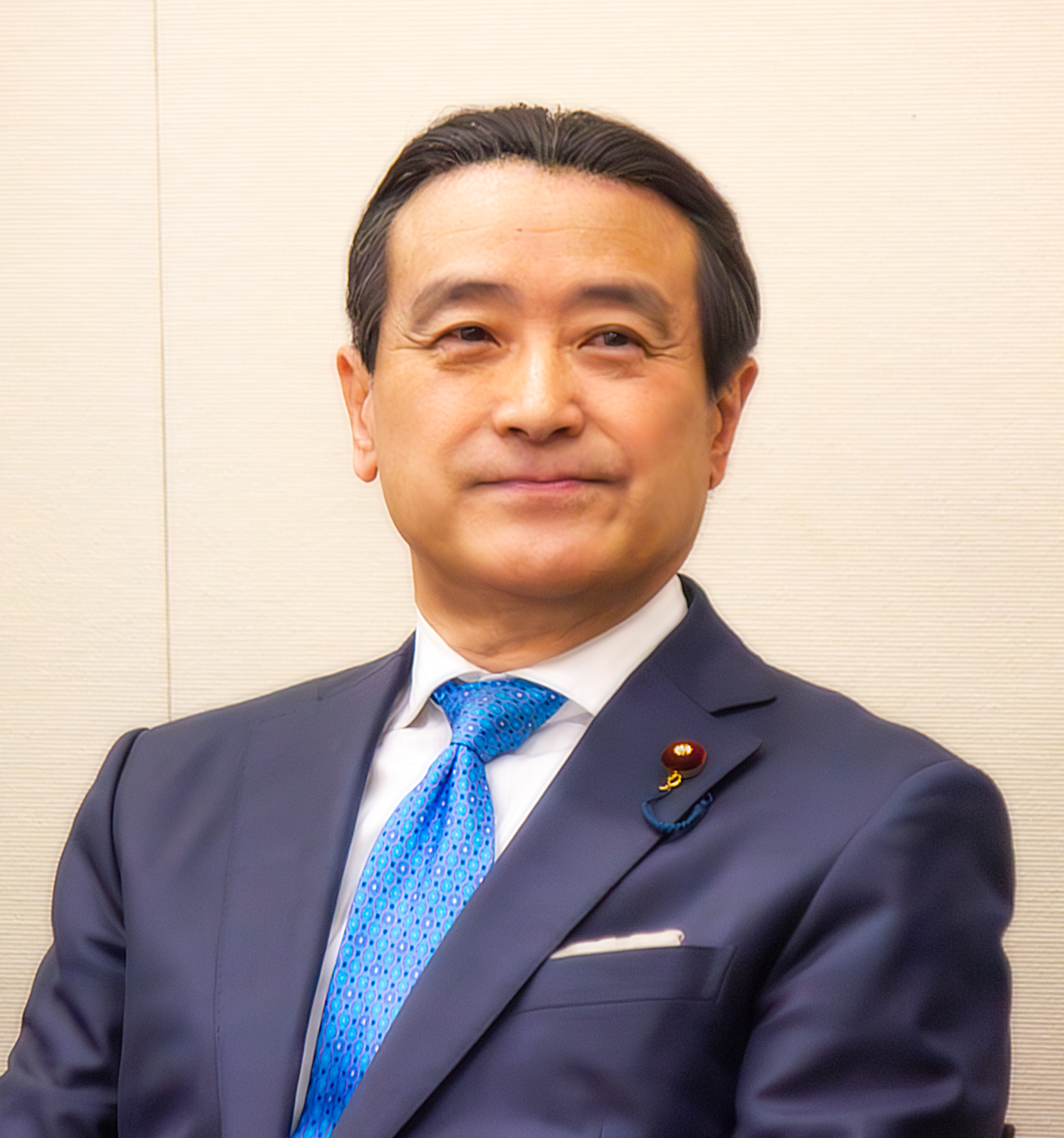
- Kenji Eda in 2025

Leader of the Japan Innovation Party
- In office 21 September 2014 – 17 May 2015
- Preceded by: Position established
- Succeeded by: Yorihisa Matsuno

Leader of the Unity Party
- In office 18 December 2013 – 21 September 2014
- Preceded by: Position established
- Succeeded by: Position abolished

Member of the House of Representatives
- In office 11 September 2005 – 23 January 2026
- Preceded by: Tetsundo Iwakuni
- Succeeded by: Hidehiro Mitani
- Constituency: Kanagawa 8th
- In office 28 October 2002 – 10 October 2003
- Preceded by: Hiroshi Nakada
- Succeeded by: Tetsundo Iwakuni
- Constituency: Kanagawa 8th

Personal details
- Born: 28 April 1956 (age 70) Okayama, Okayama Prefecture, Japan
- Party: CRA (since 2026)
- Other political affiliations: LDP (2000–2002); Independent (2002–2009); Your Party (2009–2013); Unity (2013–2014); JIP (2014–2016); DP (2016–2017); CDP (2017–2026)
- Education: University of Tokyo
- Website: www.eda-k.net

Kenji Eda (江田 憲司, Eda Kenji; born 28 April 1956) is a retired Japanese politician who was a member of the House of Representatives from 2002 to 2003 and again from 2005 to 2026.

== Biography ==
A native of Okayama Prefecture and graduate of the University of Tokyo, he joined the Ministry of International Trade and Industry in 1979, attending the Center for International Affairs at Harvard University in the United States while in the ministry. Leaving the government in 1998, he ran unsuccessfully for the House of Representatives in 2000 as a member of the Liberal Democratic Party. He ran again in 2002 as an independent, and was elected for the first time. He lost his seat in 2003, but was re-elected in 2005.

He was a member of Your Party from its foundation in 2009 to 2013. On August 7, 2013, he was demoted from the secretary-general by party leader Yoshimi Watanabe due to disagreements in political policies. He left Your Party on December 9, 2013, along with thirteen other members, and announced the formation of a new party known as the Unity Party. He stated that his goal was to "change Japan by abolishing bureaucracy-led politics, fighting vested interests and breaking the centralization of power." Your Party challenged Eda's withdrawal by ordering the resignation of the defectors.

In 2014 he joined the Japan Innovation Party, which merged with other parties to create the Democratic Party in early 2016.

He was a member of the Constitutional Democratic Party of Japan (CDP). He expressed interest in possibly running in the 2024 CDP leadership election against incumbent party leader Kenta Izumi. He eventually decided against running, agreeing instead to back candidate Harumi Yoshida.

Eda joined the Centrist Reform Alliance ahead of the February 2026 election, but was defeated by LDP candidate Hidehiro Mitani.
