= Kanagawa 6th district =

Legislative district of Japan

Kanagawa 6th District
- Parliamentary constituency for the Japanese House of Representatives
- A map of the House of Representatives constituencies in Yokohama
- Prefecture: Kanagawa
- Proportional District: Southern Kanto
- Electorate: 380,871

Current constituency
- Created: 1994
- Seats: One
- Party: LDP
- Representative: Naoki Furukawa
- Municipalities: Hodogaya-ku and Asahi-ku

Kanagawa 6th district is a single-member constituency of the House of Representatives, the lower house of the National Diet of Japan. It represents a portion of Yokohama that includes Hodogaya-ku and Asahi-ku.

== List of representatives ==
Election	Representative	Party	Dates	Notes
1996	Motohisa Ikeda	DPJ	1996 – 1998	
1996	Motohisa Ikeda	DPJ	1998 – 2003	
2000	Motohisa Ikeda	DPJ	1998 – 2003	
2003	Isamu Ueda	Komeito	2003 – 2009	
2005	Isamu Ueda	Komeito	2003 – 2009	
2009	Motohisa Ikeda	DPJ	2009 – 2012	
2012	Isamu Ueda	Komeito	2012 – 2017	
2014	Isamu Ueda	Komeito	2012 – 2017	
2017	Yoichiro Aoyagi	CDP	2017 – 2021	
2021	Naoki Furukawa	LDP	2021 – 2024	
2024	Yoichiro Aoyagi	CDP	2024 – 2026	
2026	Naoki Furukawa	LDP	2026 –	Incumbent

== Election results ==
=== 2026 ===
2026
Party	Candidate	Votes	%	±%
Liberal Democratic (endorsed by Ishin)	Naoki Furukawa	120,667	60.7	▲20.86
Centrist Reform	Yoichiro Aoyagi (incumbent)	78,256	39.3	▼1.00
Majority		42,411	0.46 21.4	▲20.94
Registered electors		375,996		
Turnout		198,923	55.23	▲0.57
LDP gain from Centrist Reform				

=== 2024 ===
2024
Party	Candidate	Votes	%	±%
CDP	Yoichiro Aoyagi (incumbent)	80,207	40.30	▼1.85
Liberal Democratic (endorsed by Komeito)	Naoki Furukawa(elected by PR)	79,281	39.84	▼4.48
Ishin	Kenichiro Shiozaka	22,994	11.55	▼1.98
Communist	Mariko Ueki	16,520	8.30	New
Majority		926	0.46	▼1.71
Registered electors		377,258		
Turnout		199,002	54.66	▼1.22
CDP gain from LDP				

2021
Party	Candidate	Votes	%	±%
LDP	Naoki Furukawa	92,405	44.32	▲18.42
CDP	Yoichiro Aoyagi (incumbent) (elected by PR)	87,880	42.15	▼2.44
Ishin	Seiichi Kushida (incumbent-PR)	28,214	13.53	▲0.91
Registered electors		381,141		
Turnout		208,499	55.88	▲3.49

2017
Party	Candidate	Votes	%	±%
CDP	Yoichiro Aoyagi (incumbent-PR)	86,291	44.59	New
Komeito	Isamu Ueda (incumbent)	82,788	42.78	▲2.93
Ishin	Seiichi Kushida (elected by PR)	24,424	12.62	New
Registered electors		382,061		
Turnout		193,503	52.39	▼2.77

2014
Party	Candidate	Votes	%	±%
Komeito	Isamu Ueda (incumbent)	78,746	39.85	▲2.48
JIP	Yoichiro Aoyagi (incumbent-PR) (reelected by PR)	52,368	26.50	New
DPJ	Kazuya Mimura	43,464	22.00	▼1.57
JCP	Mari Kitatani	23,013	11.65	▲4.20
Registered electors		373,105		
Turnout		197,591	55.16	▼6.19

2012
Party	Candidate	Votes	%	±%
Komeito	Isamu Ueda	82,147	37.37	▲0.19
YP	Yoichiro Aoyagi (elected by PR)	69,511	31.62	New
DPJ	Motohisa Ikeda (incumbent)	51,819	23.57	▼28.19
JCP	Etsuo Fujii	16,369	7.45	▼1.35
Turnout			61.35	▼8.83

2009
Party	Candidate	Votes	%	±%
DPJ	Motohisa Ikeda (incumbent-PR)	132,192	51.76	▲10.23
Komeito	Isamu Ueda (incumbent)	94,941	37.18	▼12.71
JCP	Midori Fujii	22,464	8.80	▲0.23
HRP	Hiroya Terashima	5,790	2.27	New
Turnout			70.18	

2005
Party	Candidate	Votes	%	±%
Komeito	Isamu Ueda (incumbent)	123,040	49.89	▲13.18
DPJ	Motohisa Ikeda (incumbent-PR)	102,429	41.53	▲5.06
JCP	Kiyoshi Sato	21,146	8.57	▲2.53
Turnout				

- Ikeda was elected additionally by PR due to Hisayasu Nagata’s resignation.

2003
Party	Candidate	Votes	%	±%
Komeito	Isamu Ueda (incumbent-PR)	82,269	36.71	▲13.60
DPJ	Motohisa Ikeda (incumbent) (elected by PR)	81,733	36.47	▲2.29
Indep.	Koichiro Katsumata	30,689	13.70	New
SDP	Keiko Ueda	15,854	7.08	New
JCP	Midori Fujii	13,538	6.04	▼5.63
Turnout				

2000
Party	Candidate	Votes	%	±%
DPJ	Motohisa Ikeda (incumbent)	77,169	34.18	New
Komeito	Isamu Ueda (elected by PR)	52,175	23.11	New
Indep.	Shigeru Sato	45,624	20.21	New
JCP	Midori Fujii	26,355	11.67	▼1.85
LP	Ryuji Tsuchida (elected by PR)	24,444	10.83	New
Turnout				

1996
Party	Candidate	Votes	%	±%
DPJ	Motohisa Ikeda	60,290	30.98	New
NFP	Ryuji Tsuchida	55,182	28.36	New
LDP	Akiko Santō	50,411	25.90	New
JCP	Yukichi Horino	26,316	13.52	New
LL	Toshihiko Ōkawa	2,410	1.24	New
Turnout				
