= Tomoko Abe =

Japanese politician (born 1948)

- 阿部 知子
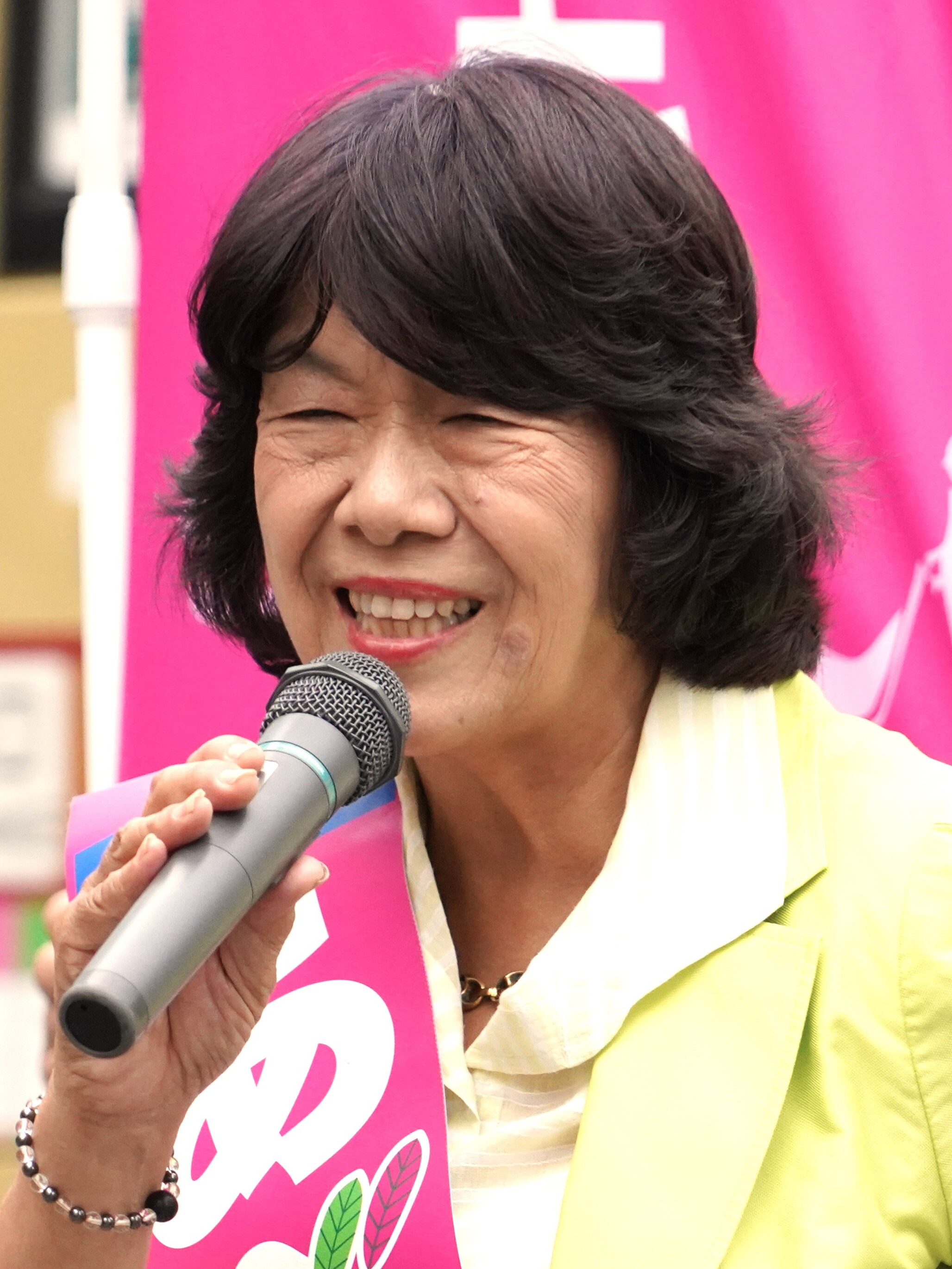
- Abe in 2024

Member of the House of Representatives
- In office 25 June 2000 – 23 January 2026
- Preceded by: Shigeru Itō
- Succeeded by: Tsuyoshi Hoshino
- Constituency: Southern Kanto PR (2000–2017); Kanagawa 12th (2017–2026)

Personal details
- Born: 24 April 1948 (age 78) Meguro, Tokyo, Japan
- Party: CRA (since 2026)
- Other political affiliations: SDP (1998–2012); Independent (2012; 2013–2014); TPJ (2012–2013); Green Wind (2013); DPJ (2014–2016); DP (2016–2017); CDP (2017–2026)
- Education: University of Tokyo
- Occupation: Politician; Paediatrician
- Website: Official website

Tomoko Abe (阿部 知子, Abe Tomoko; born 24 April 1948) is a Japanese former politician who served as a member of the House of Representatives. She is currently a member of the Constitutional Democratic Party. She was formerly the policy chief of the centre-left Social Democratic Party (SDP), and later the president and sole member of the short-lived Tomorrow Party of Japan.

She has been elected to Kanagawa 12th District constituency eight times. As of February 2024, she was the Deputy Director-General for the CDP’s Office for Tsunagaru Networking.

== Career ==
Abe attended Ochanomizu Women's University and studied at the medical faculty of Tokyo University, graduating in 1974. She worked as a pediatrician in various hospitals, including at the Mayo Clinic in the US in the 1990s. She also worked for the Tokushukai Group in Chiba and Kamakura. She has continued to be employed by the group, but does not actively work after her switch to politics in 2000.

In the 2000 Shūgiin election, Abe ran for the SDP in the 12th constituency of Kanagawa but lost by a large margin behind the other candidates of the major parties; however, she was elected via the South Kantō proportional electoral block and has been a member of the Shūgiin since 2000. After Masako Ōwaki left the party, Abe became her successor in 2003 as chair of the SDP's Political Research Council.

Before the Shūgiin election in 2012, Abe left the SDP and joined the TPJ, founded by governor of Shiga Prefecture Yukiko Kada. The party performed poorly in the election and all the remaining diet members save Abe quit the party, meaning that the TPJ could not maintain official party status in the diet, which requires five members. Abe and Kada contacted the Green Wind party, which had four Diet members, over a possible merger, but the talks were not successful. However, they did not contest the Shūgiin election in favor of the Tomorrow Party of Japan, and Abe ran for them instead. In the Kanagawa 12 constituency, she was able to surpass the Democratic incumbent Ikko Nakatsuka, but was defeated by the Liberal Democrat Tsuyoshi Hoshino. With a comparatively short constituency defeat, she won number 1 on the list of the Tomorrow Party in South Kantō and won her only proportional election mandate. When the party split shortly after the new parliament met, Abe remained the only MP from both chambers from the Tomorrow Party. In January 2013 she took over the party chairmanship from Yukiko Kada. In May 2013 she joined the Green Wind and became deputy chair.

Following the dissolution of the Green Wind at the end of 2013, Abe joined the Democratic Party before the 2014 Shūgiin election. She was defeated by less than 1000 votes behind Tsuyoshi Hoshino, but achieved the number 1 on the list of Democrats in the proportional electoral block South Kantō and was surely elected. In the split of the Democratic Party before the 2017 Shūgiin election, she joined the Constitutional Democratic Party of Yukio Edano and narrowly won Kanagawa 12.

In 2022 she took part in a multi-party group to create a new legal bill to support women struggling with issues of finance and domestic violence. The legislation was passed in May 2022.

== Nuclear power interest ==
Abe is also a leader of a group of lawmakers called Energy Shift Japan, who are pushing the government to consider alternatives to nuclear power subsequent to the Fukushima nuclear power plant disaster in March 2011. Abe and Energy Shift Japan are backing a proposal to give green energy sources access to Japan's power grid. In 2023, she and other CDP members stood against the proposal to discharge treated water from Fukushima into the ocean. She instead proposed alternative means of storing irradiated water.
