= Hajime Sono =

Japanese politician (born 1993)

- 宗野 創
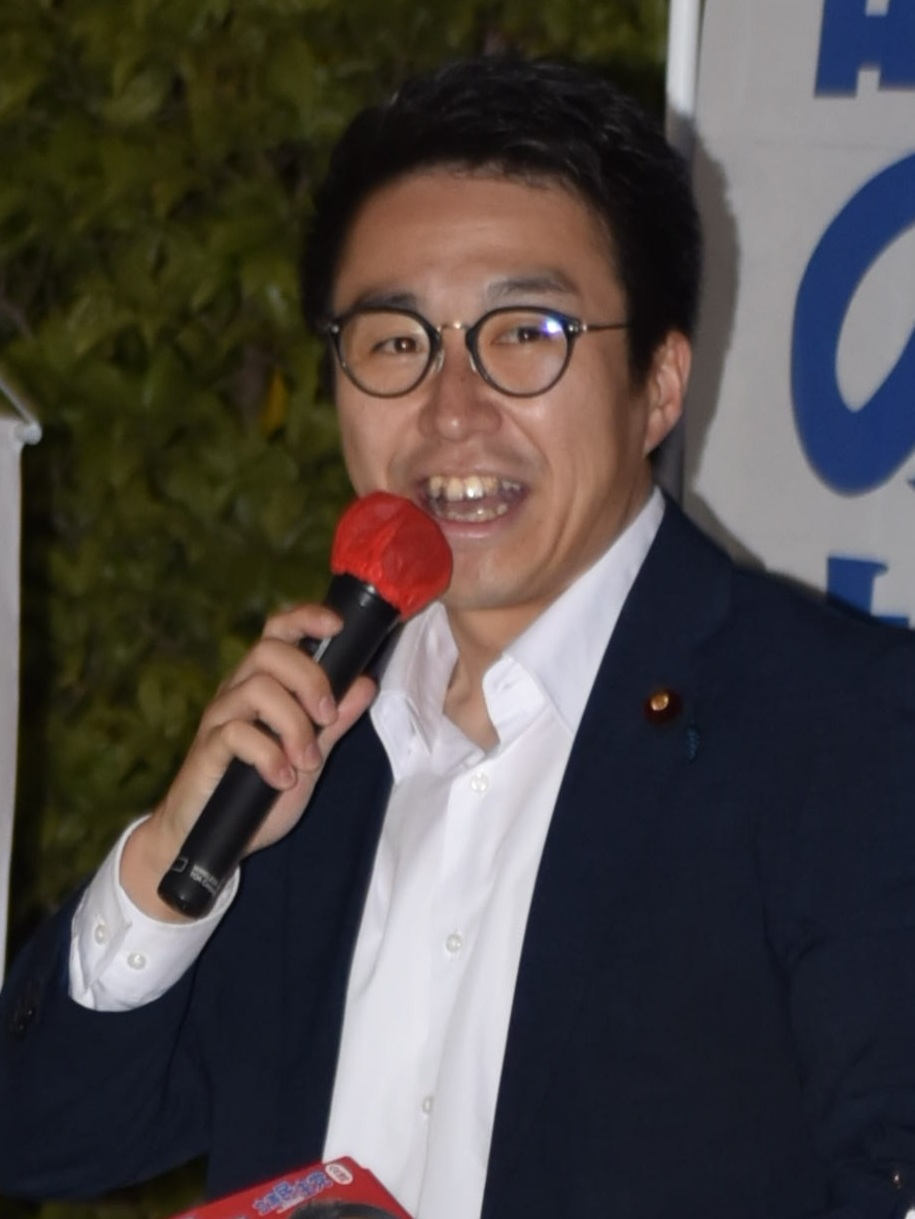
- Sono in 2025

Member of the House of Representatives
- In office 30 October 2024 – 23 January 2026
- Preceded by: Daishiro Yamagiwa
- Succeeded by: Daishiro Yamagiwa
- Constituency: Kanagawa 18th

Personal details
- Born: 5 January 1993 (age 33) Hodogaya, Yokohama, Japan
- Party: CRA (since 2026)
- Other political affiliations: CDP (2024–2026)
- Education: Waseda University

Hajime Sono (宗野創, Sono Hajime; born 5 January 1993) is a Japanese politician who served as a member of the House of Representatives from 2024 to 2026. From 2016 to 2020, he worked at the Sumitomo Mitsui Banking Corporation.
