= Yoichiro Esaki =

Japanese politician (born 1958)

- 江﨑 洋一郎
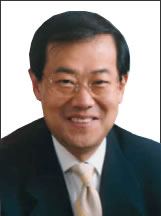
- Official portrait, 2006

Member of the House of Representatives; from Southern Kanto
- In office 25 June 2000 – 21 July 2009
- Preceded by: Ikuzo Sakurai
- Succeeded by: Multi-member district
- Constituency: Kanagawa 12th (2000–2003); PR block (2003–2009)

Personal details
- Born: 20 April 1958 (age 68) Shinjuku, Tokyo, Japan
- Party: Liberal Democratic
- Other political affiliations: NFP (1994–1997); DPJ (1998–2002); NCP (2002–2003)
- Parent: Masumi Esaki (father)
- Relatives: Tetsuma Esaki (brother)
- Education: Keio University

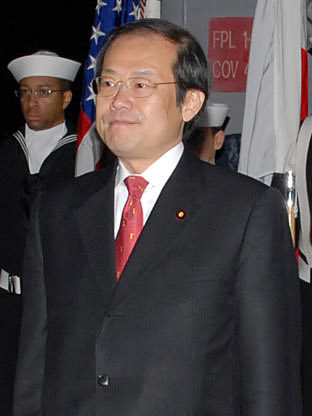
Youichiro Esaki in 2008

Yoichiro Esaki (江崎 洋一郎, Esaki Yōichirō; born 20 April 1958) is a Japanese politician of the Liberal Democratic Party (LDP), a member of the House of Representatives in the Diet (national legislature).

A native of Shinjuku, Tokyo and a graduate of Keio University, he worked at the Industrial Bank of Japan from 1981 to 1993. He was elected to the House of Representatives for the first time in 2000 as a member of the Democratic Party of Japan after running unsuccessfully in 1996 as a member of the New Frontier Party. He later joined the LDP.
