= Kanagawa 12th district =

Legislative district of Japan

Kanagawa 12th District
- Parliamentary constituency for the Japanese House of Representatives
- Numbered map of Kanagawa Prefecture single-member districts
- Prefecture: Kanagawa
- Proportional District: Southern Kanto
- Electorate: 410,480

Current constituency
- Created: 1994
- Seats: One
- Party: LDP
- Representative: Tsuyoshi Hoshino
- Municipalities: Fujisawa and Kōza District

Kanagawa 12th district is a single-member constituency of the House of Representatives, the lower house of the National Diet of Japan. It includes the city of Fujisawa and Kōza District.

== List of representatives ==
| Election | Representative | Party | Dates | Notes |
|---|---|---|---|---|
| 1996 | Ikuzo Sakurai | LDP | 1996 – 2000 | |
| 2000 | Yoichiro Esaki | DPJ | 2000 – 2002 | |
| 2000 | Yoichiro Esaki | NCP | 2002 - 2003 | |
| 2000 | Yoichiro Esaki | LDP | 2003 | |
| 2003 | Ikko Nakatsuka | DPJ | 2003 – 2005 | |
| 2005 | Ikuzo Sakurai | LDP | 2005 – 2009 | |
| 2009 | Ikko Nakatsuka | DPJ | 2009 – 2012 | |
| 2012 | Tsuyoshi Hoshino | LDP | 2012 – 2017 | |
| 2014 | Tsuyoshi Hoshino | LDP | 2012 – 2017 | |
| 2017 | Tomoko Abe | CDP | 2017 – 2026 | |
| 2021 | Tomoko Abe | CDP | 2017 – 2026 | |
| 2024 | Tomoko Abe | CDP | 2017 – 2026 | |
| 2026 | Tsuyoshi Hoshino | LDP | 2026 – | |

== Election results ==
=== 2026 ===
2026
| Party | Candidate | Votes | % | ±% |
|---|---|---|---|---|
| LDP | Tsuyoshi Hoshino | 108,343 | 49.4 | ▲18.4 |
| Centrist Reform | Tomoko Abe | 78,793 | 35.9 | ▼3.8 |
| Independent | Susumu Kikutake | 21,089 | 9.6 | |
| JCP | Tsuneo Numakami | 11,210 | 5.1 | ▼1.2 |
| Registered electors | | 410,541 | | |
| Turnout | | | 55.05 | ▲2.09 |
| LDP gain from Centrist Reform | | | | |

=== 2024 ===
2024
| Party | Candidate | Votes | % | ±% |
|---|---|---|---|---|
| CDP | Tomoko Abe (Incumbent) | 84,310 | 39.71 | ▼2.72 |
| LDP | Tsuyoshi Hoshino (Incumbent - PR) (reelected by PR)) | 65,684 | 30.94 | ▼9.77 |
| Innovation | Masashi Mito | 29,458 | 13.88 | ▼2.98 |
| Sanseitō | Takahiro Eoka | 19,518 | 9.19 | New |
| Communist | Naoko Kato | 13,326 | 6.28 | New |
| Majority | | 18,626 | 8.77 | ▲7.05 |
| Registered electors | | 411,161 | | |
| Turnout | | 212,296 | 52.96 | ▼3.18 |
| LDP hold | | | | |

2021
| Party | Candidate | Votes | % | ±% |
|---|---|---|---|---|
| CDP | Tomoko Abe (Incumbent) | 95,013 | 42.43 | ▼0.77 |
| LDP | Tsuyoshi Hoshino (Incumbent - PR) (reelected by PR) | 91,159 | 40.71 | ▼1.18 |
| Ishin | Masashi Mito | 37,753 | 16.86 | New |
| Registered electors | | 406,623 | | |
| Turnout | | 223,925 | 56.14 | ▲4.46 |

2017
| Party | Candidate | Votes | % | ±% |
|---|---|---|---|---|
| CDP | Tomoko Abe (Incumbent - PR) | 86,550 | 43.20 | New |
| LDP | Tsuyoshi Hoshino (Incumbent) (elected by PR) | 83,924 | 41.89 | ▼0.55 |
| Kibō | Teruo Hara | 29,852 | 14.90 | New |
| Registered electors | | 395,393 | | |
| Turnout | | 200,326 | 51.68 | ▼1.62 |

2014
| Party | Candidate | Votes | % | ±% |
|---|---|---|---|---|
| LDP | Tsuyoshi Hoshino (Incumbent) | 83,327 | 42.44 | ▲8.38 |
| DPJ | Tomoko Abe (Incumbent - PR) (reelected by PR) | 82,612 | 42.08 | ▲19.91 |
| JCP | Kotaro Mimura | 16,189 | 8.25 | ▲3.21 |
| PFG | Kazuhiko Amakasu | 14,208 | 7.24 | New |
| Registered electors | | 379,426 | | |
| Turnout | | 196,336 | 53.30 | |

2012
| Party | Candidate | Votes | % | ±% |
|---|---|---|---|---|
| LDP | Tsuyoshi Hoshino | 73,476 | 34.06 | ▲5.20 |
| TPJ | Tomoko Abe (Incumbent - PR) (reelected by PR) | 50,976 | 23.63 | New |
| DPJ | Ikko Nakatsuka (Incumbent) | 47,834 | 22.17 | ▼23.71 |
| JRP | Kazuhiko Amakasu | 32,590 | 15.11 | New |
| JCP | Tsuneo Numakami | 10,871 | 5.04 | ▲0.37 |
| Turnout | | | | |

2009
| Party | Candidate | Votes | % | ±% |
|---|---|---|---|---|
| DPJ | Ikko Nakatsuka | 110,532 | 45.88 | ▲13.19 |
| LDP | Ikuzo Sakurai (Incumbent) | 69,524 | 28.86 | ▼18.06 |
| SDP | Tomoko Abe (Incumbent - PR) (reelected by PR) | 47,538 | 19.73 | ▲4.59 |
| JCP | Chikako Watanabe | 11,240 | 4.67 | ▼0.59 |
| HRP | Shigeru Yamada | 2,056 | 0.85 | New |
| Turnout | | | | |

2005
| Party | Candidate | Votes | % | ±% |
|---|---|---|---|---|
| LDP | Ikuzo Sakurai (Incumbent - PR) | 108,898 | 46.92 | ▲8.59 |
| DPJ | Ikko Nakatsuka (Incumbent) | 75,865 | 32.69 | ▼6.71 |
| SDP | Tomoko Abe (Incumbent - PR) (reelected by PR) | 35,133 | 15.14 | ▲1.13 |
| JCP | Tsuneo Numakami | 12,211 | 5.26 | ▼0.60 |
| Turnout | | | | |

2003
| Party | Candidate | Votes | % | ±% |
|---|---|---|---|---|
| DPJ | Ikko Nakatsuka (Incumbent - PR) | 75,826 | 39.40 | ▲11.30 |
| LDP | Ikuzo Sakurai (elected by PR) | 73,767 | 38.33 | ▲12.01 |
| SDP | Tomoko Abe (Incumbent - PR) (reelected by PR) | 26,954 | 14.01 | ▼4.78 |
| JCP | Midori Takamatsu | 11,280 | 5.86 | ▼2.06 |
| Indep. | Kōichi Suzuki | 4,617 | 2.40 | New |
| Turnout | | | | |

2000
| Party | Candidate | Votes | % | ±% |
|---|---|---|---|---|
| DPJ | Yoichiro Esaki | 54,237 | 28.10 | New |
| LDP | Ikuzo Sakurai (Incumbent) | 50,814 | 26.32 | ▼4.34 |
| Indep. | Naotake Harada | 36,414 | 18.86 | New |
| SDP | Tomoko Abe (elected by PR) | 36,276 | 18.79 | New |
| JCP | Tsuneo Numakami | 15,293 | 7.92 | ▼7.09 |
| Turnout | | | | |

1996
| Party | Candidate | Votes | % | ±% |
|---|---|---|---|---|
| LDP | Ikuzo Sakurai | 51,360 | 30.66 | New |
| NFP | Yoichiro Esaki | 50,511 | 30.15 | New |
| DPJ | Naotake Harada | 40,523 | 24.19 | New |
| JCP | Shoichi Kuwabara | 25,143 | 15.01 | New |
| Turnout | | | | |
