= Isamu Ueda =

Japanese politician

- 上田 勇
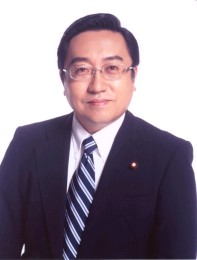
- Official portrait, 2004

Member of the House of Councillors
- Incumbent
- Assumed office 26 July 2022
- Constituency: National PR

Member of the House of Representatives; from Southern Kanto
- In office 19 December 2012 – 28 September 2017
- Preceded by: Motohisa Ikeda
- Succeeded by: Yoichiro Aoyagi
- Constituency: Kanagawa 6th
- In office 18 June 1993 – 21 July 2009
- Preceded by: Kazuo Fushiki
- Succeeded by: Motohisa Ikeda
- Constituency: Kanagawa 1st (1993–1996); PR block (1996–2003); Kanagawa 6th (2003–2009)

Personal details
- Born: 5 August 1958 (age 68) Yokohama, Kanagawa, Japan
- Party: Komeito (since 1998)
- Other political affiliations: CGP (1993–1994); NFP (1994–1998)
- Education: University of Tokyo

Isamu Ueda (上田 勇, Ueda Isamu; born 5 August 1958) is a Japanese politician of the New Komeito Party, who serves as a member of the House of Councillors in the Diet (national legislature).

A native of Yokohama, Kanagawa and graduate of the University of Tokyo, he worked at the Ministry of Agriculture, Forestry and Fisheries from 1981 to 1993. He was elected to the House of Representatives for the first time in 1993.
