= Motohisa Ikeda =

Japanese politician (1940–2024)

- 池田 元久
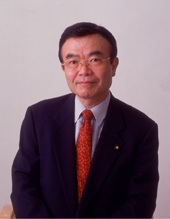
- Official portrait, 2011

Member of the House of Representatives; from Southern Kanto
- In office 4 April 2006 – 16 November 2012
- Preceded by: Hisayasu Nagata
- Succeeded by: Isamu Ueda
- Constituency: PR block (2006–2009); Kanagawa 6th (2009–2012)
- In office 21 October 1996 – 8 August 2005
- Preceded by: Constituency established
- Succeeded by: Multi-member district
- Constituency: Kanagawa 6th (1996–2003); PR block (2003–2005)
- In office 19 February 1990 – 18 June 1993
- Preceded by: Keishu Tanaka
- Succeeded by: Ryūshi Tsuchida
- Constituency: Kanagawa 4th

Personal details
- Born: 20 December 1940 Fujisawa, Kanagawa, Japan
- Died: 22 January 2024 (aged 83) Tokyo, Japan
- Party: Democratic
- Other political affiliations: JSP (1990–1996); SDP (1996); DP (1996–1998)
- Education: Waseda University

Motohisa Ikeda (池田 元久, Ikeda Motohisa; 20 December 1940 – 22 January 2024) was a Japanese politician of the Democratic Party of Japan, who served as a member of the House of Representatives in the Diet (national legislature). A native of Fujisawa, Kanagawa and graduate of Waseda University, he worked at the public broadcaster NHK as a reporter from 1964 to 1989. He was elected to the House of Representatives for the first time in 1990 as a member of the Japan Socialist Party but lost his seat in 1993. He was re-elected in 1996. Ikeda died on 22 January 2024, at the age of 83.

== Sources ==
- 政治家情報 〜池田 元久〜. JANJAN ザ･選挙 (in Japanese).
