= Tsuyoshi Hoshino =

Japanese politician (born 1963)

- 星野 剛士
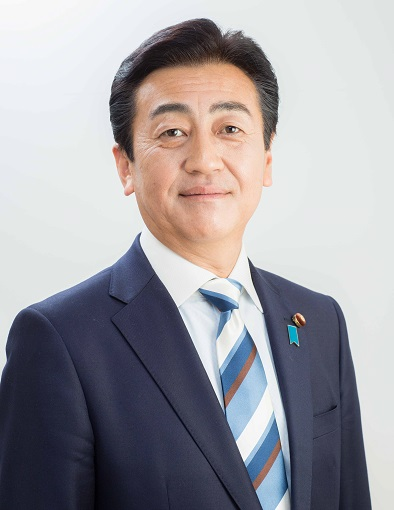
- Official portrait, 2017

Member of the House of Representatives; from Southern Kanto
- Incumbent
- Assumed office 19 December 2012
- Preceded by: Ikko Nakatsuka
- Constituency: Kanagawa 12th (2012–2017); PR block (2017–2026); Kanagawa 12th (2026–present)

Member of the Kanagawa Prefectural Assembly
- In office 1995–2007
- Constituency: Fujisawa City

Personal details
- Born: 8 August 1963 (age 63) Fujisawa, Kanagawa, Japan
- Party: Liberal Democratic
- Education: Nihon University

Tsuyoshi Hoshino (星野剛士, Hoshino Tsuyoshi; born 8 August 1963) is a Japanese politician serving as a member of the House of Representatives since 2012. From 1995 to 2007, he was a member of the Kanagawa Prefectural Assembly.
