= Kanagawa 18th district =

Legislative district of Japan

- Parliamentary constituency for the House of Representatives
- A map of the House of Representatives constituencies in Kanagawa
- Prefecture: Kanagawa
- Proportional District: Southern Kanto
- Electorate: 408,423 (2023)

Current constituency
- Created: 2002
- Seats: One
- Party: LDP
- Representative: Daishiro Yamagiwa
- Created from: Kanagawa 8th, 9th, 10th district
- Municipalities: Takatsu and Nakahara Wards of Kawasaki City

Kanagawa 18th district (神奈川県第18区, Kanagawa-ken dai-jyūhakku or 神奈川18区, Kanagawa jyūhakku) is a constituency of the House of Representatives in the Diet of Japan (national legislature). It is located in western Kawasaki. The district consists of Takatsu and Nakahara Wards of Kawasaki City . As of December 1, 2020, 449,625 eligible voters were registered in the district.

In 2003, the first election since the establishment of this electoral district, Takkeshi Hidaka of the Democratic Party was elected, and Daishirō Yamagiwa of the Liberal Democratic Party was proportionally restored. Since then, he has alternated between Yamagiwa in 2005 and Hidaka in 2009. Yamagiwa held the district between 2012 and 2024.

== List of members representing the district ==
Member	Party	Dates	Electoral history	Notes
Takeshi Hidaka	Democratic	November 10, 2003 – August 8, 2005	Redistricted from the 7th district and Re-elected in 2003. Lost re-election.	Lost re-election in the Southern Kanto PR block.
Daishirō Yamagiwa	Liberal Democratic	September 12, 2005 – July 21, 2009	Re-elected in 2005. Lost re-election.	Elected in 2003 by the Southern Kanto PR block. Lost re-election in the Southern Kanto PR block.
Takeshi Hidaka	Democratic	August 31, 2009 – July 11, 2012	Elected in 2009. Lost re-election.	Lost re-election in the Southern Kanto PR block.
Takeshi Hidaka	Tomorrow	July 11, 2012 – November 16, 2012	Elected in 2009. Lost re-election.	Lost re-election in the Southern Kanto PR block.
Daishirō Yamagiwa	Liberal Democratic	December 17, 2012 – October 9, 2024	Elected in 2012. Re-elected in 2014. Re-elected in 2017. Re-elected in 2021.	Minister of State for Economic and Fiscal Policy (2021 – 2022)
Hajime Sohno	CDP	2024 –2026		
Daishirō Yamagiwa	Liberal Democratic	February 8, 2026 –	Elected in 2026	

== Election results ==
=== 2026 ===
2026
Party	Candidate	Votes	%	±%
LDP	Daishirō Yamagiwa	76,615	32.39	▲8.85
Centrist Reform	Hajime Sohno (Incumbent)	52,074	22.01	▼8.71
DPP	Yoshitaka Nishioka (elected in PR))	49,861	21.08	▼2.46
Ishin	Mitsuhiro Yokota (elected in PR))	26,388	11.16	▼1.25
Sanseitō	Shuichi Fujita	17,879	7.56	
JCP	Yoko Yamaki	13,738	5.81	▼3.99
Turnout		236,555	57.78	▲1.79
Registered electors		416,266		
LDP gain from Centrist Reform				

=== 2024 ===
2024
Party	Candidate	Votes	%	±%
CDP	Hajime Sohno	68,632	30.7	▼4.9
DPP	Yoshitaka Nishioka (elected in PR))	52,596	23.5	
LDP	Daishirō Yamagiwa (elected in PR))	52,593	23.5	▼24.2
Ishin	Mitsuhiro Yokota	27,727	12.4	▼4.1
JCP	Chikako Kimishima	21,898	9.8	
Turnout			56.0	▼1.2
Registered electors		413,241		
CDP gain from LDP				

=== 2021 ===
General election 2021: Kanagawa's 18th
Party	Candidate	Votes	%	±%
LDP	Daishirō Yamagiwa	120,365	47.7	▼3.4
CDP	Kazuya Mimura	90,390	35.8	New
Ishin	Mitsuhiro Yokota	41,562	16.5	New
Turnout		252,317	57.2	▲5.9
Registered electors		451,301		
LDP hold				

=== 2017 ===
General election 2017: Kanagawa's 18th
Party	Candidate	Votes	%
LDP	Daishirō Yamagiwa	111,285	51.1
Kibō no Tō	Kazuya Mimura	66,057	30.4
JCP	Yasuhisa Wakabayashi	40,252	18.5
Total votes		217,594	100.0
LDP hold			

=== 2014 ===
General election 2014: Kanagawa's 18th
Party	Candidate	Votes	%
LDP	Daishirō Yamagiwa	86,869	40.0
Future Generations	Hiroshi Nakada	59,138	27.2
Ishin	Itaru Kitamura	26,691	12.3
JCP	Yoshio Shioda	24,616	11.3
People's Life	Takeshi Hidaka	20,105	9.2
Total votes		217,419	100.0
LDP hold			

=== 2012 ===
General election 2012: Kanagawa's 18th
Party	Candidate	Votes	%
LDP	Daishirō Yamagiwa	82,333	40.9
Your	Jirō Funakawa	43,873	21.8
Democratic	Shinsuke Amiya	34,205	17.0
Tomorrow	Takeshi Hidaka	25,279	12.5
JCP	Masako Yamazaki	15,514	7.7
Total votes		201,204	100.0
LDP gain from Tomorrow			

=== 2009 ===
General election 2009: Kanagawa's 18th
Party	Candidate	Votes	%
Democratic	Takeshi Hidaka	110,239	48.8
LDP	Daishirō Yamagiwa	82,221	36.4
JCP	Hiroyuki Muneta	15,832	7.0
Your	Kōtarō Fujisaki	14,325	6.3
Minor party	Hiroko Tōyama	3,209	1.4
Total votes		225,826	100.0
Democratic gain from LDP			

=== 2005 ===
General election 2005: Kanagawa's 18th
Party	Candidate	Votes	%
LDP	Daishirō Yamagiwa	111,787	53.7
Democratic	Takeshi Hidaka	77,877	37.4
JCP	Hiroyuki Muneta	18,345	8.8
Total votes		208,009	100.0
LDP gain from Democratic			

=== 2003 ===
General election 2003: Kanagawa's 18th
Party	Candidate	Votes	%
Democratic	Takeshi Hidaka	64,879	38.0
LDP	Daishirō Yamagiwa (elected by PR)	58,001	33.9
Independent	Eiichi Ogawa	15,136	8.9
Independent	Keiko Hirata	13,267	7.8
JCP	Hiroyuki Muneta	13,084	7.7
Social Democratic	Hideaki Takemura	5,610	3.3
Independent	Yukio Anzai	875	0.5
Total votes		170,852	100.0
Democratic win (new seat)			
