= Takayuki Kobayashi =

Japanese politician (born 1974)

- 小林 鷹之
- Kobayashi in 2026

Chair of the Liberal Democratic Party Policy Research Council
- Incumbent
- Assumed office 7 October 2025
- President: Sanae Takaichi
- Vice President: Tarō Asō
- Secretary-General: Shun'ichi Suzuki
- Preceded by: Itsunori Onodera

Minister of State for Economic Security
- In office 4 October 2021 – 10 August 2022
- Prime Minister: Fumio Kishida
- Preceded by: Office established
- Succeeded by: Sanae Takaichi

Member of the House of Representatives
- Incumbent
- Assumed office 16 December 2012
- Preceded by: Yū Kuroda
- Constituency: Chiba 2nd

Personal details
- Born: 29 November 1974 (age 51) Ichikawa, Chiba, Japan
- Party: Liberal Democratic
- Children: 1
- Education: Kaisei Academy
- Alma mater: University of Tokyo; Harvard Kennedy School
- Occupation: Lawyer • Politician

Takayuki Kobayashi (小林 鷹之, Kobayashi Takayuki; born 29 November 1974) is a Japanese politician who has served as Chairman of the Policy Research Council in the Liberal Democratic Party since October 2025. He served as Minister of State for Economic Security from 2021 to 2022.

== Early life and education ==
Kobayashi was born in Ichikawa, Chiba, and educated at Kaisei Academy. His first application to the University of Tokyo, made in his final year of high school, was unsuccessful, which led him to spend an extra year studying as a ronin student to reapply. He succeeded on his second attempt and matriculated at the University of Tokyo in 1994, graduating with a bachelor's degree from the Faculty of Law in 1999. While at the university, he served as captain of the rowing team.

After spending two years at Harvard, he received an M.P.P. degree from the Harvard Kennedy School in 2003.

== Career ==
Kobayashi joined the Ministry of Finance in 1999 and worked in the Financial Bureau (ja:理財局), whose main task was to manage government bonds, fiscal investment and loans, and state property. Keizo Hamada, later the governor of Kagawa Prefecture, was Kobayashi's boss at the Bureau. From 2007 to 2010, he worked as a diplomat at the Embassy of Japan in Washington, D.C.

Having spent half of the first decade of the 21st century in the United States and participating in various international negotiations, he realised that Japan's international standing was declining at an alarming rate. He felt that indecisive politicians and their inward-looking power struggles were jeopardising the country's future, hence he decided to pursue a political career himself in 2010.

=== House of Representatives ===
In June 2010, he became the head of the Chiba Prefecture Second Constituency branch of the Liberal Democratic Party, and in December 2012, he was first elected to the House of Representatives in the 46th General Election for the House of Representatives, running for the Chiba Second Constituency on the Liberal Democratic Party's official ticket and the New Komeito Party's nomination.

==== Government cabinet ====
On 5 August 2016, he was appointed Parliamentary Vice-Minister for Defence in Abe Cabinet, and stepped down on 3 August 2017.

He was elected to the House of Representatives in the 48th general election in 2017.

In the 2021 LDP leadership election, he endorsed Sanae Takaichi. In the run-off election, he supported Fumio Kishida. He was appointed to the Kishida Cabinet as Minister of State for Economic security on 4 October 2021. Kobayashi left cabinet due to a reshuffle in August 2022.

=== LDP leadership elections ===
In August 2024, Kobayashi announced his leadership candidacy for the Liberal Democratic Party in the 2024 leadership election. He lost the election to former Defense Minister Shigeru Ishiba on 27 September 2024.

In September 2025, Kobayashi announced a second leadership candidacy for the Liberal Democratic Party in the 2025 leadership election following the resignation of Prime Minister Ishiba. After the leadership election, Kobayashi revealed that he voted for the final winner Sanae Takaichi in the second round runoff vote.

=== LDP Policy Research Council ===
Following her victory, LDP President Sanae Takaichi appointed Kobayashi as chairman of the Policy Research Council in the LDP on 7 October 2025.

Political offices
Preceded by Shinji Inoue	Minister of State for Science and Technology Policy; 2021–2022	Succeeded by Sanae Takaichi
New ministerial post	Minister of State for Economic Security; 2021–2022	Succeeded by Sanae Takaichi
Party political offices
Preceded by Itsunori Onodera	Chairman of the Policy Research Council, Liberal Democratic Party; 2025–present	Incumbent
