= Ikuzo Sakurai =

Japanese politician

- 桜井 郁三
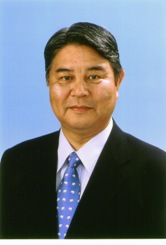
- Official portrait, 2007

Member of the House of Representatives; from Southern Kanto
- In office 10 November 2003 – 21 July 2009
- Preceded by: Multi-member district
- Succeeded by: Ikko Nakatsuka
- Constituency: PR block (2003–2005); Kanagawa 12th (2005–2009)
- In office 20 October 1996 – 2 June 2000
- Preceded by: Constituency established
- Succeeded by: Yoichiro Esaki
- Constituency: Kanagawa 12th

Member of the Fujisawa City Assembly
- In office 1974–1990

Personal details
- Born: 10 April 1944 Fujisawa, Kanagawa, Japan
- Died: 10 February 2013 (aged 68) Shinjuku, Tokyo, Japan
- Party: Liberal Democratic
- Education: Nihon University

Ikuzo Sakurai (桜井 郁三, Sakurai Ikuzō; 10 April 1944 – 10 February 2013) was a Japanese politician of the Liberal Democratic Party, who served as a member of the House of Representatives in the Diet (national legislature). A native of Fujisawa, Kanagawa and graduate of Nihon University, he was elected to the House of Representatives for the first time in 1996 after serving in the city assembly of Fujisawa for four terms. He lost his seat in 2000 but was re-elected three years later.
