= Shigeru Itō =

Japanese politician (1928–2016)

- 伊藤 茂

Minister of Transport
- In office 9 August 1993 – 28 April 1994
- Prime Minister: Morihiro Hosokawa
- Preceded by: Ihei Ochi
- Succeeded by: Nobuaki Futami

Member of the House of Representatives; from Southern Kanto
- In office 6 December 1976 – 2 June 2000
- Preceded by: Ōide Shun
- Succeeded by: Tomoko Abe
- Constituency: Kanagawa 1st (1976–1996); PR block (1996–2000)

Personal details
- Born: 2 March 1928 Funagata, Yamagata, Japan
- Died: 11 September 2016 (aged 88)
- Party: Social Democratic
- Other political affiliations: Socialist (1976–1996)
- Education: University of Tokyo

Shigeru Itō (伊藤茂; 1928–2016) was a Japanese socialist politician. He held several positions in the Japan Socialist Party (JSP) and then in the Social Democratic Party. He also served as the minister of transportation between 1993 and 1994.

== Biography ==
Itō graduated from the University of Tokyo receiving a bachelor's degree in economics. He worked as a junior staff at the headquarters of the JSP in Tokyo in the 1960s. He was elected as one of the secretaries to the national congress for the restoration of Japan–China diplomatic relations which was established by the JSP in 1970. He became a member of the House of Representatives in 1976 from the JSP and served there for eight terms until 2000.

In early 1980s Itō and two other socialist politicians were accused by a former Soviet spy of intentionally or unintentionally helping the Soviet security agency, KGB. As of 1989 Itō was the chairman of the JSP's policy board.

In August 1993 Itō was appointed minister of transport to the cabinet led by Prime Minister Morihiro Hosokawa. He remained in the post until April 1994. When the JSP was dissolved in 1996 Itō joined the Social Democratic Party and served as its secretary general.

Itō died in September 2016.
