= Hidehiro Mitani =

Japanese politician (born 1976)

- 三谷 英弘
- Official portrait, 2025

Member of the House of Representatives
- Incumbent
- Assumed office 25 October 2017
- Constituency: Southern Kanto PR (2017–2026); Kanagawa 8th (2026–present)
- In office 21 December 2012 – 21 November 2014
- Constituency: Tokyo PR

Personal details
- Born: 28 June 1976 (age 50) Fujisawa, Kanagawa, Japan
- Party: Liberal Democratic
- Other political affiliations: Your Party (2010–2014)
- Education: University of Tokyo; University of Washington

Hidehiro Mitani (三谷英弘, Mitani Hidehiro; born 28 June 1976) is a Japanese politician. He has been a member of the House of Representatives since 2017, having previously served from 2012 to 2014. Until 2014, he was a member of Your Party.
