= Tetsundo Iwakuni =

Japanese politician (1936–2023)

- 岩國 哲人

Member of the House of Representatives
- In office 21 October 1996 – 21 July 2009
- Preceded by: Constituency established
- Succeeded by: Multi-member district
- Constituency: Tokyo 6th (1996–2000); Tokyo PR (2000–2003); Kanagawa 8th (2003–2005); Southern Kanto PR (2005–2009)

Mayor of Izumo
- In office 1989–1995
- Preceded by: Mitsuhiro Naora
- Succeeded by: Masahiro Nishio

Personal details
- Born: 11 July 1936 Osaka, Japan
- Died: 6 October 2023 (aged 87) Chicago, Illinois, U.S.
- Party: Democratic (1998–2010)
- Other political affiliations: NFP (1994–1996); Sun (1996–1998); GGP (1998); LDP (2010–2023)
- Education: University of Tokyo

Tetsundo Iwakuni (岩國 哲人, Iwakuni Tetsundo; 11 July 1936 – 6 October 2023) was a Japanese politician who, until 2009, represented Democratic Party of Japan as a member of the House of Representatives in the Diet (national legislature).

== Early life ==
Iwakuni was born in Osaka and graduated from the University of Tokyo.

== Business career ==
Iwakuni worked at Nikko Securities from 1959 to 1977, heading its offices in London, Paris and Beirut, and then at Morgan Stanley from 1977 to 1984.

In 1984 he became the CEO of Merrill Lynch Japan, and in 1987 was promoted to a senior executive position at Merrill Lynch Capital Markets in the US.

== Political career ==
In 1989, Iwakuni left Merrill Lynch to become mayor of Izumo, Shimane. After running unsuccessfully for the governorship of Tokyo in 1995, he was elected to the House of Representatives for the first time in 1996.

He served as the Director-General of the International Department of the Democratic Party of Japan until 2009, when he decided to step down from politics.

He has also served as vice president of the DPJ. Iwakuni last served as Senior Adviser to GR Japan, a government relations consultancy, teaching at several universities in Japan, Korea, and the U.S. In 2010 he was appointed a policy advisor to the Liberal Democratic Party.

== Death ==
Iwakuni died on 6 October 2023, at the age of 87.

Preceded by Mitsuhiro Naora	Mayor of Izumo; 1989–1995	Succeeded by Toshihiro Nishio
