= Daishiro Yamagiwa =

Japanese politician

- 山際 大志郎
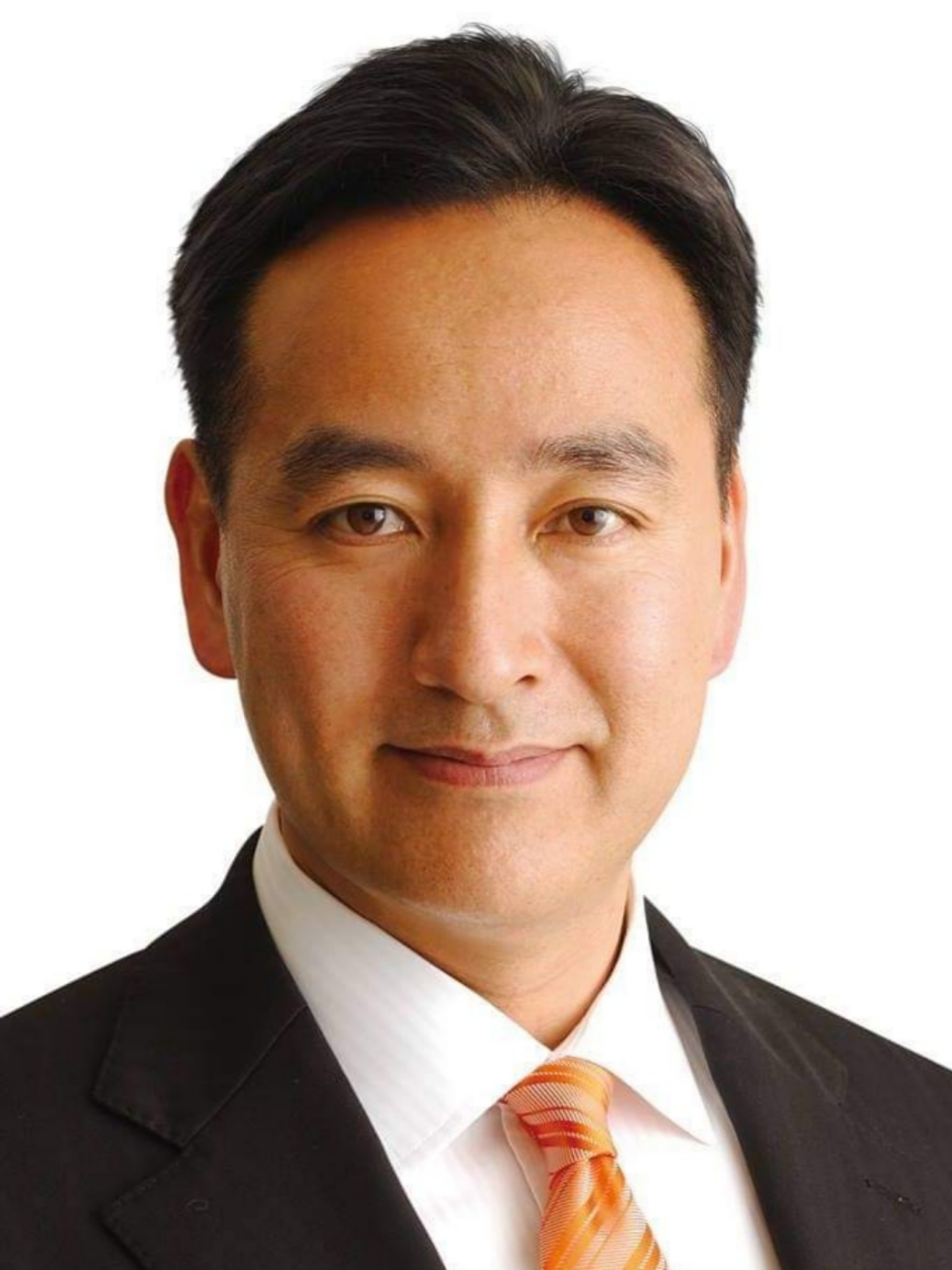
- Official portrait, 2021

Minister of Economic Revitalization
- In office 4 October 2021 – 24 October 2022
- Prime Minister: Fumio Kishida
- Preceded by: Yasutoshi Nishimura
- Succeeded by: Shigeyuki Goto

Member of the House of Representatives; from Northern Kanto
- Incumbent
- Assumed office 19 December 2012
- Preceded by: Takeshi Hidaka
- Constituency: Kanagawa 18th (2012–2024); PR block (2024–2026); Kanagawa 18th (2026–present)
- In office 9 November 2003 – 21 July 2009
- Preceded by: Multi-member district
- Succeeded by: Takeshi Hidaka
- Constituency: PR block (2003–2005); Kanagawa 18th (2005–2009)

Personal details
- Born: 12 September 1968 (age 58) Koganei, Tokyo, Japan
- Party: Liberal Democratic
- Education: Yamaguchi University; University of Tokyo

Daishiro Yamagiwa (山際 大志郎, Yamagiwa Daishirō; born 12 September 1968) is a Japanese politician of the Liberal Democratic Party, serving as a member of the House of Representatives in the Diet (national legislature). He served as Minister in charge of Economic Revitalization under the cabinet of Prime Minister Fumio Kishida from October 2021 to October 2022.

== Career ==
A native of Kamakura, Kanagawa, Yamagiwa graduated from Yamaguchi University and received a Ph.D. in veterinary medicine from the University of Tokyo. After working as a veterinarian, he was elected to the House of Representatives for the first time in 2003.

Within the LDP, Yamagiwa has served as Parliamentary Secretary of Cabinet Office, and as a member of the Committee on Cabinet. In his early years in parliament, much of his work related to trade relations with other countries, notably in Africa, East Asia, and Islands in the Southern Ocean.

On 10 August 2022, seven ministers were purged because of ties to the Unification Church following the assassination of Shinzo Abe and increasing media scrutiny of LDP officials' close ties with the church. The Kishida administration had asked ministers to disclose any connections to the church prior to reshuffling the second cabinet. Because Yamagiwa neglected to disclose this information and his records had not yet been investigated, he retained his post as Minister of Economic Revitalization. After the new cabinet was formed, past exchanges between Yamagiwa and the controversial religious organization resurfaced. He announced that he had previously paid membership fees and attended a Unification Church event but explained his delayed response by claiming he had forgotten and no longer had access to the records that would implicate him. He resigned from his cabinet position on 24 October 2022, expressing regret for his actions and stating that he will remain as a member of the Diet because he did not do anything illegal. Yamagiwa stepped down voluntarily as to avoid any additional turbulence caused by the scandal. He was the highest ranking government official to be purged, though indirectly. Yamagiwa continues to rank highly within the LDP's hierarchical structure, working on many of the same international issues related to economy, energy, and wildlife.

=== Jobs ===
- Veterinarian
- Chairperson, Committee on Cabinet, HR
- State Minister of Economy, Trade, and Industry
- Parliamentary Vice-Minister of Cabinet Office
- Committee on Economy, Trade and Industry, HR
- Director, Economy, Trade and Industry Division, LDP

=== Parliamentary Friendship Associations ===
- Japan-African Union Parliamentary Friendship Association
- Chief Secretary, Japan-Pacific Ocean islands countries Parliamentary Friendship Association

=== Areas of Interest ===
- Economy
- Energy

== Political views ==
Yamagiwa is affiliated to the openly revisionist lobby Nippon Kaigi, and a member of the Shintō Seiji Renmei Diet group.

Yamagiwa gave the following answers to the questionnaire submitted by Mainichi to parliamentarians in 2012:

- in favor of the revision of the Constitution
- In favor of whaling
- in favor of right of collective self-defense (revision of Article 9)
- in favor of reform of the National assembly (unicameral instead of bicameral)
- in favor of reactivating nuclear power plants
- against the goal of zero nuclear power by 2030s
- in favor of the relocation of Marine Corps Air Station Futenma (Okinawa)
- in favor of a strong attitude versus China
- in favor of the reform of the Imperial Household that would allow women to retain their Imperial status even after marriage
- should start considering a nuclear-armed Japan
- no answer regarding the participation of Japan to the Trans-Pacific Partnership
