= Ikko Nakatsuka =

Japanese politician (born 1965)

- 中塚 一宏
- Official portrait, 2011

Minister of State for Financial Services
- In office 1 October 2012 – 26 December 2012
- Prime Minister: Yoshihiko Noda
- Preceded by: Tadahiro Matsushita
- Succeeded by: Taro Aso

Member of the House of Representatives
- In office 31 August 2009 – 16 November 2012
- Preceded by: Ikuzo Sakurai
- Succeeded by: Tsuyoshi Hoshino
- Constituency: Kanagawa 12th
- In office 25 June 2000 – 8 August 2005
- Preceded by: Multi-member district
- Succeeded by: Ikuzo Sakurai
- Constituency: Kinki PR (2000–2003); Kanagawa 12th (2003–2005)

Personal details
- Born: 4 April 1965 (age 61) Kyoto, Japan
- Party: Democratic
- Other political affiliations: LDP (before 1993); JRP (1993–1994); NFP (1994–1998); LP (1998–2003)
- Children: 2
- Education: Kyoto University
- Website: Official website

Ikko Nakatsuka (born 4 April 1965) is a Japanese politician, member of Democratic Party of Japan and former minister of state.

== Early life and education ==
Nakatsuka was born in Kyoto Prefecture on 4 April 1965. He graduated with an engineering degree from Kyoto University in March 1990.

== Career ==
Nakatsuka began his political career in the now-disestablished Shinshinto (New Frontier Party). Next, he served as a policy staffer of the defunct Liberal Party established by Ichiro Ozawa. He later joined the Democratic Party of Japan in 2003. He has been serving as the party's vice secretary general and deputy policy chief since then.

He served two times in the Japanese House of Representatives. He was first elected in 2000. In 2003, he was secondly elected to the house and appointed vice minister of economic and fiscal policy, finance. In 2009, he was again elected. In September 2011, he became senior vice minister of cabinet affairs. He served as senior vice Minister of State for Financial Services issues at the Cabinet Office until October 2012. Nakatsuta was appointed Minister of State for Financial Services in the Noda Cabinet on 1 October 2012. His term ended on 26 December 2012. Nakatsuka also lost his seat in the 2012 general elections.

== Personal life ==
Nakatsuta is married and has two children. He was lead singer in a band and participated in volunteer work during his university years.
