= Hisayasu Nagata =

Japanese politician

- 永田 寿康
- Official portrait, 2003

Member of the House of Representatives; from Southern Kanto
- In office 25 June 2000 – 4 April 2006
- Preceded by: Kazuo Eguchi
- Succeeded by: Motohisa Ikeda
- Constituency: Chiba 2nd (2000–2005); PR block (2005–2006)

Personal details
- Born: 2 September 1969 Nagoya, Aichi, Japan
- Died: 3 January 2009 (aged 39) Kitakyushu, Fukuoka, Japan
- Party: Democratic
- Education: University of Tokyo (BS); University of California, Los Angeles (MBA)

Hisayasu Nagata (永田 寿康, Nagata Hisayasu; 2 September 1969 – 3 January 2009) was a Japanese politician born in Nagoya City in Aichi Prefecture. He was well known for falsely accusing the former Livedoor CEO Takafumi Horie of bribing the Liberal Democratic Party.

== Early life and career ==
Nagata secured a B.S. from University of Tokyo in 1993 and then entered the Ministry of Finance. In 1995, he obtained an MBA from University of California, Los Angeles (UCLA).

== Political career ==
In 1999, he resigned from his position in the Ministry of Finance to run for the House of Representatives in Chiba Prefecture. Nagata's career in the Diet was marked by numerous embarrassing and controversial episodes.

On 20 November 2000, Diet member Kenshiro Matsunami doused Nagata with water for suggesting that he had slept with female Diet member Chikage Ogi. Nagata later claimed he had said nothing of the sort and was actually only stating that then Prime Minister Yoshirō Mori was unfit to be the leader of his country.

On 5 April 2001, he asked questions at the main session of the Diet without written notes, opening the doors for a new level of preparedness in younger politicians who do not need to follow scripts in making speeches or during hearings, unlike their older peers.

In November 2002, a convict was killed at Nagoya Prison after being blasted with a high-pressure water hose. Nagata and others tried to prove that this was not an accident and that the officers who committed the act were, indeed, negligent by conducting a similar experiment on a mannequin. However, it was later revealed that the water pressure of the hose used in the experiment was more than ten times that of what had been used at the time of the incident, and, hence, the DPJ was later forced to apologize.

On 11 March 2004, he made disparaging remarks about Keizō Obuchi, Yoshirō Mori, and Junichiro Koizumi. The ruling Liberal Democratic Party protested and his remarks were removed from the record.

In July 2005, he accused the LDP coalition party, the New Komeito Party, of illegally moving voter registrations to Tokyo in the recent metropolitan elections. Nagata had no proof and based his statements on rumor, and the DPJ apologized to the Komeito.

In a similar incident in August 2005, Nagata accused the Komeito supporter group, the Sōka Gakkai, of not registering as a religious group. The group has been registered as such since 1952, and the group brought suit against Nagata for libel later that month.

On 16 February 2006, Nagata accused in parliament former Livedoor CEO Takafumi Horie of bribing the son of Tsutomu Takebe, the Liberal Democratic Party secretary general, through consulting fees. Nagata touted an alleged email by Horie instructing Livedoor to pay Takebe's son as evidence. Democratic Party of Japan (DPJ) secretary general Seiji Maehara called for the government to investigate the matter. However, it was later revealed that the email couldn't be verified. As a result, DPJ made a formal public apology. Its top officials, including Maehara, resigned and Nagata was suspended from the party. Nagata later resigned from the National Diet.

== Death ==
In November 2008, Nagata attempted suicide and was taken into police custody. On 3 January 2009, Nagata committed suicide by leaping from a high-rise apartment building in Yahatanishi-ku, Kitakyūshū, Japan.
