= Yokohama City Council =

Legislature of Yokohama City, Japan

Yokohama City Council 横浜市会 Yokohama-shikai

Type
- Type: Unicameral

History
- Founded: 1889 (municipal mergers of the Meiji era (明治の大合併)

Leadership
- President (gichō): Takeshi Shibuya, LDP since 15 May 2025
- Vice-President (fuku-gichō): Futoshi Ozaki, Komeito since 15 May 2025

Structure
- Political groups: Government (15): CDP (10); JCP (5); Opposition (71): LDP (31); Komeito (15); Ishin (8); DPP (6); Local Party Yokohama (2); Independents (9)

Elections
- Voting system: Single non-transferable vote
- Last election: 9 April 2023

Meeting place
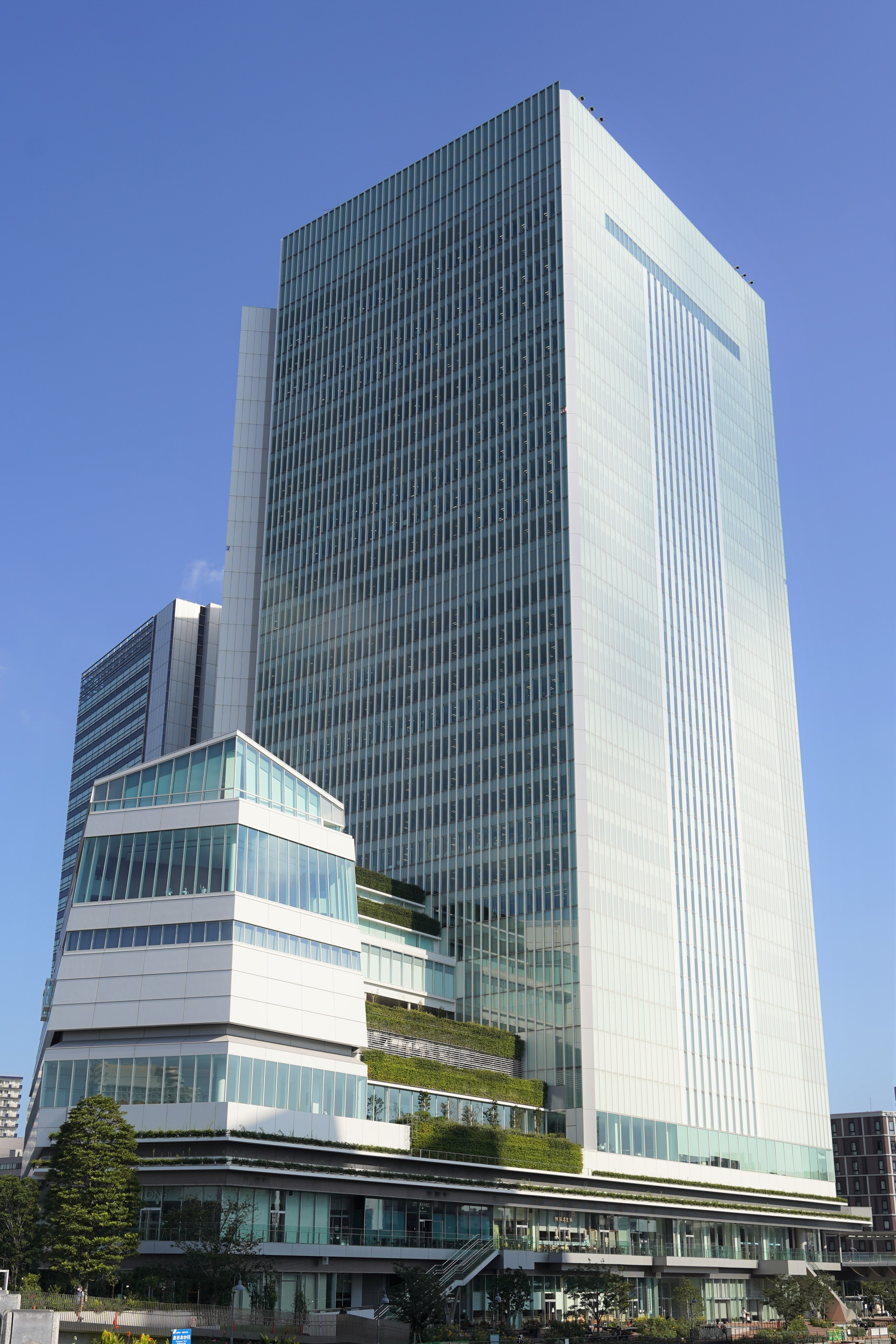
- Japan, Yokohama City Hall, Kanagawa Prefecture, Yokohama City, Naka Ward, Honcho, 6-50-10.

Website
- 横浜市会

The Yokohama City Council (横浜市会, Yokohama-shi kai) is the legislature of Yokohama City.

== Overview ==
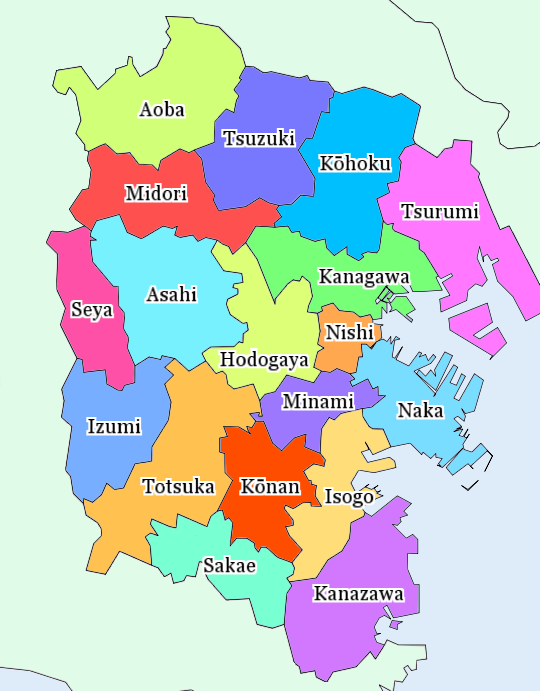
Map of Council districts

- Members: 86
- Term: 4 years
- Voting System: Medium‐size constituency system (Single non-transferable vote)
- President: Tomio Shimizu (LDP)
- Vice-president: Masaharu Takahashi (Komeito)

== Current composition ==
As of 2021, the city council was composed as follows:

Composition of the Yokohama City Council
Parliamentary group	Seats
Liberal Democratic Party	36
Constitutional Democratic Party of Japan	20
Kōmeitō	16
Japanese Communist Party	9
Kanagawa Network	1
Independents	4
Total	86

== Electoral districts ==
Electoral districts
District	Magnitude	District	Magnitude	District	Magnitude
Tsurumi-ku	7	Kanagawa-ku	5	Nishi-ku	2
Naka-ku	3	Minami-ku	4	Kōnan-ku	5
Hodogaya-ku	5	Asahi-ku	6	Isogo-ku	4
Kanazawa-ku	5	Kōhoku-ku	8	Midori-ku	4
Aoba-ku	7	Tsuzuki-ku	5	Totsuka-ku	6
Sakae-ku	3	Izumi-ku	4	Seya-ku	3

== Representatives' compensation and benefits ==
Position	Monthly remuneration	Annual bonus	Government activity allowance	Annual salary
President	1,179,000 yen	5,010,750 yen	550,000 yen / month	25,758,750 yen
Vice-president	1,061,000 yen	4,509,250 yen	550,000 yen / month	23,841,250 yen
Member	953,000 yen	4,050,250 yen	550,000 yen / month	22,086,250 yen
"横浜市市会議員の議員報酬、費用弁償及び期末手当に関する条例" (in Japanese).
