= Unity Party (Japan) =

Unity Party 結いの党
- Leader: Kenji Eda
- Secretary-General: Jiro Ono
- Founder: Kenji Eda
- Founded: 18 December 2013
- Dissolved: 21 September 2014
- Split from: Your Party
- Merged into: Japan Innovation Party
- Headquarters: 2-9-6 Nagatacho; Chiyoda, Tokyo
- Newspaper: Conservative Japan
- Colors: Blue

Website
- yuinotoh.jp

The Unity Party (結いの党, Yui no Tō) was a Japanese political party.

== History ==
The party was formed in December 2013 by Kenji Eda and 13 other legislators who left Your Party. Your Party initially refused to acknowledge that six councillors had left its caucus in the House of Councillors, but filed a notice in February 2014 which acknowledged their departure from Your Party, allowing the Unity Party to have formal representation in the upper house.

The party supported Morihiro Hosokawa in the 2014 Tokyo gubernatorial election.

Eda had discussions with the Japan Restoration Party in early 2014 with a view toward coordinating the two parties' policy stances. JRP co-head Shintaro Ishihara rejected the idea of coordinating with the Unity Party on the basis of their support for the Constitution of Japan, while the other JRP co-head Toru Hashimoto saw room for agreement on the scope of necessary revisions to the Constitution.

On 21 September 2014, the Unity Party and the Japan Restoration Party merged to form the Japan Innovation Party.

== Presidents of UP ==
No.	Name	Image	Term of office	
No.	Name	Image	Took office	Left office
Preceding party: Your Party
1	Kenji Eda		18 December 2013	21 September 2014
Successor parties: Japan Innovation Party

== Members in the Diet ==
=== House of Representatives ===
- Yoichiro Aoyagi (South Kanto PR block)
- Kenji Eda (Kanagawa 8th district)
- Mitsunari Hatanaka (Kinki PR block)
- Hiroki Hayashi (Tohoku PR block)
- Yosei Ide (Hokuriku-Shin'etsu PR block)
- Nobuhiko Isaka (Kinki PR block)
- Masanari Koike (Tokai PR block)
- Mito Kakizawa (Tokyo 15th district)
- Tsuyoshi Shiina (South Kanto PR block)

=== House of Councillors ===
- Yukio Fujimaki (National block)
- Ryuhei Kawada (National block)
- Yuichi Mayama (National block)
- Jiro Ono (National block)
- Takumi Shibata (National block)
- Sukeshiro Terata (National block)

== Election results ==
=== Tokyo Gubernatorial Elections ===
Election	Candidate	Votes	%	Result
2014	Morihiro Hosokawa (Note: supported)	956,063	19.39	Lost
