= Japan Innovation Party (2014–2016) =

Former Japanese political party

Japan Innovation Party 維新の党
- Founders: Kenji Eda; Tōru Hashimoto
- Founded: 1 August 2014
- Dissolved: 27 March 2016
- Merger of: Japan Restoration Party; Unity Party
- Merged into: Democratic Party
- Ideology: Conservatism; Neoliberalism; Right-wing populism
- Political position: Centre-right
- Colors: Blue (official); Lime green (customary)

Website
- ishinnotoh.jp
- Politics of Japan; Political parties; Elections; A: The party was sometimes regarded as centrist or right-wing.

The Japan Innovation Party (維新の党, Ishin no Tō, lit. 'Party of Restoration') was a political party in Japan. It was launched on 22 September 2014, following the merger of the Japan Restoration Party headed by Tōru Hashimoto, and the Unity Party, led by Kenji Eda. On 27 March 2016 the party merged with the Democratic Party of Japan and Vision of Reform to form the Democratic Party (Minshintō).

== History ==
When it was founded, the Japan Innovation Party was led by Kenji Eda and Osaka city mayor Tōru Hashimoto. Their initial policy positions included constitutional revision, increased local government autonomy, and the phasing out of nuclear power, and the party also signalled a willingness to work with the Liberal Democratic Party and Party for Future Generations on issues where their policies aligned. Soon after forming, however, Hashimoto resigned in December 2014 from his role in order to focus on the Osaka mayoral election scheduled for the spring of 2015, and Eda remained as the sole leader of the party.

Following the defeat of the Osaka Metropolis plan in an Osaka city referendum in May 2015, Eda resigned as leader and former Democratic Party of Japan member Yorihisa Matsuno was elected as his replacement.

In October 2015 a faction aligned with Hashimoto split from the party to form the Initiatives from Osaka. Then, in late October, another four members left after expressing dissatisfaction with Matsuno's leadership; the group went on to form the Vision of Reform in December 2015.

On 24 February 2016, the Japan Innovation Party, Vision of Reform and larger Democratic Party of Japan (DPJ) announced an agreement to merge ahead of the Upper House elections in July 2016. On 14 March 2016 the Japanese name of the new party was announced as Minshintō, having been the most popular choice of two possible names among voters. On 27 March 2016, the DPJ, Vision of Reform, JIP and other minor parties merged to form the new Democratic Party.

== Presidents of JIP ==
No.	Name	Photo	Took office	Left office
Preceding parties: Restoration Party & Unity Party
1	Co-leadership: Tōru Hashimoto & / Kenji Eda		21 September 2014	23 December 2014
2	Kenji Eda		23 December 2014	17 May 2015
3	Yorihisa Matsuno		19 May 2015	27 March 2016
Successor parties: Initiatives from Osaka & Democratic Party (2016)

== Election results ==
=== House of Representatives ===
Election	Leader	Constituency			Party list			Total	Position	Status
Election	Leader	Votes	%	Seats	Votes	%	Seats	Total	Position	Status
2014	Kenji Eda	4,319,646	8.16	11 / 295	8,382,699	15.72	30 / 180	41 / 475	3rd	Opposition
