= Southern Kanto proportional representation block =

Japanese House of Representatives constituency

Southern Kanto Proportional Representation Block
- Parliamentary constituency for the Japanese House of Representatives
- Map of House of Representatives proportional blocks, with the Southern Kanto block highlighted
- Prefectures: Chiba, Kanagawa, and Yamanashi
- Electorate: 13,605,378 (2026)

Current constituency
- Created: 1994
- Number of members: 23

The Southern Kantō proportional representation block (Hirei [daihyō] Minami-Kantō burokku (比例[代表]南関東ブロック)) is one of eleven proportional representation (PR) "blocks", multi-member constituencies for the House of Representatives in the Diet of Japan. It consists of Southern parts of the Kantō region covering Chiba, Kanagawa and Yamanashi prefectures. Following the introduction of proportional voting it initially elected 23 representatives in the 1996 general election, then 21 after the total number of PR seats had been reduced from 200 to 180. After reapportionment in 2002 the number was increased to 22 representatives and again to 23 in 2022.

== Results timeline ==
=== Vote share ===
Party	1996	2000	2003	2005	2009	2012	2014	2017	2021	2024	2026
LDP	28.99	24.74	34.62	42.40	25.99	26.43	33.96	34.28	34.94	25.40	35.56
NFP	26.55										
DPJ (Note: 1996 DP)	21.21	27.68	39.98	29.47	42.99	17.31	17.61				
JCP	14.04	11.53	7.39	6.85	7.00	5.86	11.90	8.01	7.21	6.10	4.24
SDP	6.43	9.56	4.26	5.37	4.30	1.93	1.94	1.27	1.68	1.53	1.24
Komeito		12.43	13.75	12.17	10.03	10.61	12.81	11.46	11.47	10.17	
LP		11.98									
Nippon				3.74	0.93						
Your					7.04	12.45					
PNP					1.20						
Ishin (Note: 2012 JRP, 2014 JIP)						18.89	15.41	3.92	11.65	7.47	6.25
TPJ						6.25					
PLP							2.57				
CDP								23.46	22.28	23.70	
KnT								17.23			
DPFP									5.19	12.64	10.63
Reiwa									4.08	6.59	2.73
Sanseitō										3.72	7.16
CPJ										2.66	2.49
CRA											19.21
Mirai											9.20
Others	2.78 (Note: NSP 1.64, LL 1.14)	2.08			0.51 (Note: HRP 0.51)	0.27 (Note: HRP 0.27)	3.81 (Note: Generations 3.46, HRP 0.35)	0.38 (Note: HRP 0.38)	1.50 (Note: NHK 1.50)		1.29 (Note: Genyu 1.29)
Turnout		59.47	57.60	66.29	67.26	59.53	53.13	51.62	55.48	53.72	55.07

=== Seat distribution ===
Election	Distribution	Seats
1996		23
2000		21
2003		22
2005		22
2009		22
2012		22
2014		22
2017		22
2021		22
2024		23
2026		23

== List of representatives ==
Note: Party affiliations as of election day.

1996–	2000–	2003–	2005–	2009–	2012–
Kazuo Shii
Masahiro Nakaji	Takeshi Ōmori	Tomoko Abe			Tomoko Abe
Takeshi Ōmori	Tomoko Abe	Hiroyuki Nagahama	Hiroyuki Nagahama resigned 2007, replaced by Hirohisa Fujii	Kazuya Mimura	Yūichi Gotō
Shigeru Itō	Yōko Hara	Motohisa Ikeda	Hitoshi Gotō	Ken'ichi Kaneko	Sōichirō Okuno
Shun Hayama	Kimiaki Matsuzaki	Yasuhiko Wakai	Hirofumi Ryū	Atsushi Chūgo	Yasuhiko Wakai
Sakihito Ozawa	Shun Hayama	Naohiko Katō	Hisayasu Nagata resigned 2006, replaced by Motohisa Ikeda	Kōichirō Katsumata	Yukio Ubukata
Tetsuo Kitamura	Hitoshi Gotō	Ken'ichirō Satō	Tetsundo Iwakuni	Katsuhito Yokokume	Yōichirō Aoyagi
Ken'ichirō Satō	Akira Ōide	Hiroshi Sudō	Akira Uchiyama	Makoto Yamazaki	Katsuhito Nakajima
Yukio Ubukata	Nobuhiko Sutō	Akira Ōide	Kaname Tajima	Hirohisa Fujii	Tsuyoshi Shiina
Hitoshi Yonetsu	Eiji Nagai	Keikō Hakariya	Shigeyuki Tomita	Tomohiko Mizuno	Sakihito Ozawa
Yūichi Ichikawa	Takeshi Hidaka	Ai Aoki	Noriko Furuya	Mitsuji Ishida	Manabu Matsuda
Nobuo Kawakami	Ryūshi Tsuchida	Nobuo Kawakami	Kazufumi Taniguchi	Tsuyoshi Saitō	Takashi Tanuma
Isamu Ueda	Yūichi Ichikawa	Shigeyuki Tomita	Yōichirō Esaki	Shino Aihara	Yuzuru Nishida
Shigeyuki Tomita	Nobuo Kawakami	Noriko Furuya	Jirō Ono	Keiichirō Asao	Tamotsu Shiiki
Kenzō Yoneda	Isamu Ueda	Shōzaburō Nakamura	Mikio Fujita	Shigeyuki Tomita	
Kimiaki Matsuzaki	Yasukazu Hamada	Yōichirō Esaki	Kōtarō Nagasaki	Noriko Furuya	
Kazuya Ishibashi died 1999, replaced by Ken'ichi Mizuno	Hiromichi Watanabe	Hirokazu Matsuno	Masaaki Akaike	Akira Amari	Shin'ichi Nakatani
Shōzaburō Nakamura	Kenzō Yoneda	Tsuneo Suzuki	Mineyuki Fukuda	Motoo Hayashi	Hiroaki Kadoyama
Sadao Ioku	Yukio Jitsukawa	Ikuzō Sakurai	Nobuhiro Ōmiya	Jun Matsumoto	Noriko Horiuchi
Akira Amari	Taei Nakamoto	Yoshitaka Sakurada	Keisuke Suzuki	Ken Saitō	Norihiko Nakayama
Hachirō Okonogi	Yoshitaka Sakurada	Hiromichi Watanabe	Taizō Sugimura	Kazunori Tanaka	Tomohiro Yamamoto
Kunio Tanabe	–	Daishirō Yamagiwa	Toshio Ukishima	Hirokazu Matsuno	Mineyuki Fukuda
Kazunori Tanaka	–	–			

== Election results ==
=== 2026 ===
2026 results in the Southern Kanto PR block
Party	Votes	Swing	%	Seats	+/–
Liberal Democratic Party (LDP)	2,637,938	35.56	▲10.16	4 (Note: Six of ten seats forfeited due to lack of candidates)	▼3
Centrist Reform Alliance (CRA) (Note: Swings compared to CDP and Komeito)	1,424,763	19.21	▼14.66	7	▼1
Democratic Party For the People (DPFP)	788,564	10.63	▼2.01	3	0
Team Mirai	682,469	9.20	New	3	New
Sanseitō	531,288	7.16	▲3.44	2	▲1
Japan Innovation Party (Ishin)	463,287	6.25	▼1.22	2	0
Japanese Communist Party (JCP)	314,224	4.24	▼1.86	1	0
Reiwa Shinsengumi (Reiwa)	202,655	2.73	▼3.86	1	0
Conservative Party of Japan (CPJ)	184,802	2.49	▼0.17	0	0
Tax Cuts Japan and Yukoku Alliance (Genyu)	95,646	1.29	New	0	New
Social Democratic Party (SDP)	91,827	1.24	▼0.29	0	0
Total	7,417,463	100.00		23	
Invalid votes	75,629	1.01			
Turnout	7,493,092	55.07	▲1.35		
Registered voters	13,605,378				

=== 2024 ===
2024 results in the Southern Kanto PR block
Party	Votes	Swing	%	Seats	+/–
Liberal Democratic Party (LDP)	1,822,230	25.40	▼9.54	7	▼2
Constitutional Democratic Party of Japan (CDP)	1,700,535	23.70	▲1.43	6	▲1
Democratic Party For the People (DPFP)	907,124	12.64	▲7.46	3	▲2
Komeito	729,980	10.17	▼1.30	2	0
Japan Innovation Party (Ishin)	536,161	7.47	▼4.18	2	▼1
Reiwa Shinsengumi (Reiwa)	472,519	6.59	▲2.50	1	0
Japanese Communist Party (JCP)	437,724	6.10	▼1.11	1	0
Sanseitō	267,145	3.72	New	1	New
Conservative Party of Japan (CPJ)	191,169	2.66	New	0	New
Social Democratic Party (SDP)	109,959	1.53	▼0.15	0	0
Total	7,174,546	100.00		23	▲1
Invalid votes	149,772	2.04			
Turnout	7,324,318	53.72	▼1.76		
Registered voters	13,635,476				

=== 2021 ===
2021 results in the Southern Kanto PR block
Party	Votes	Swing	%	Seats	+/–
Liberal Democratic Party (LDP)	2,590,787	34.94	▲0.66	9	▲1
Constitutional Democratic Party of Japan (CDP)	1,651,562	22.28	▼1.18	5	0
Japan Innovation Party (Ishin)	863,897	11.65	▲7.73	3	▲2
Komeito	850,667	11.47	▲0.02	2	0
Japanese Communist Party (JCP)	534,493	7.21	▼0.80	1	▼1
Democratic Party For the People (DPFP)	384,482	5.19	New	1	New
Reiwa Shinsengumi (Reiwa)	302,675	4.08	New	1	New
Social Democratic Party (SDP)	124,447	1.68	▲0.41	0	0
NHK Party	111,298	1.50	New	0	New
Total	7,414,308	100.00		22	
Invalid votes	161,827	2.14			
Turnout	7,576,135	55.48	▲3.86		
Registered voters	13,655,876				

=== 2017 ===
2017 results in the Southern Kanto PR block
Party	Votes	Swing	%	Seats	+/–
Liberal Democratic Party (LDP)	2,356,614	34.28	▲0.32	8	0
Constitutional Democratic Party of Japan (CDP)	1,612,425	23.46	New	5	New
Kibō no Tō	1,184,103	17.23	New	4	New
Komeito	787,461	11.46	▼1.35	2	▼1
Japanese Communist Party (JCP)	550,404	8.01	▼3.89	2	▼1
Japan Innovation Party (Ishin)	269,274	3.92	New	1	New
Social Democratic Party (SDP)	87,517	1.27	▼0.67	0	0
Happiness Realization Party (HRP)	26,331	0.38	▲0.03	0	0
Total	6,874,129	100.00		22	
Invalid votes	114,815	1.64			
Turnout	6,988,944	51.62	▼1.52		
Registered voters	13,539,564				

=== 2014 ===
2014 results in the Southern Kanto PR block
Party	Votes	Swing	%	Seats	+/–
Liberal Democratic Party (LDP)	2,321,609	33.96	▲7.53	8	▲2
Democratic Party of Japan (DPJ)	1,203,572	17.61	▲0.29	4	0
Japan Innovation Party (JIP)	1,053,221	15.41	▼3.48	4	▼1
Komeito	875,712	12.81	▲2.20	3	▲1
Japanese Communist Party (JCP)	813,634	11.90	▲6.04	3	▲2
Party for Future Generations	236,596	3.46	New	0	New
People's Life Party (PLP)	175,431	2.57	New	0	New
Social Democratic Party (SDP)	132,542	1.94	▲0.01	0	0
Happiness Realization Party (HRP)	24,052	0.35	▲0.08	0	0
Total	6,836,369	100.00		22	
Invalid votes	152,136	2.18			
Turnout	6,988,505	53.13	▼6.40		
Registered voters	13,152,606				

=== 2012 ===
2012 results in the Southern Kanto PR block
Party	Votes	Swing	%	Seats	+/–
Liberal Democratic Party (LDP)	2,020,043	26.43	▲0.45	6	0
Japan Restoration Party (JRP)	1,443,270	18.89	New	5	New
Democratic Party of Japan (DPJ)	1,323,048	17.31	▼25.68	4	▼7
Your Party	951,294	12.45	▲5.40	3	▲2
Komeito	810,936	10.61	▲0.58	2	0
Tomorrow Party of Japan (TPJ)	477,309	6.25	New	1	New
Japanese Communist Party (JCP)	447,890	5.86	▼1.14	1	0
Social Democratic Party (SDP)	147,191	1.93	▼2.38	0	▼1
Happiness Realization Party (HRP)	20,987	0.27	▼0.24	0	0
Total	7,641,968	100.00		22	
Invalid votes	153,917	1.97			
Turnout	7,795,885	59.53	▼7.73		
Registered voters	13,095,467				

=== 2009 ===
2009 results in the Southern Kanto PR block
Party	Votes	Swing	%	Seats	+/–
Democratic Party of Japan (DPJ)	3,695,159	42.99	▲13.53	11	▲4
Liberal Democratic Party (LDP)	2,233,560	25.99	▼16.41	6	▼4
Komeito	862,427	10.03	▼2.13	2	▼1
Your Party	605,358	7.04	New	1	New
Japanese Communist Party (JCP)	601,299	7.00	▲0.15	1	0
Social Democratic Party (SDP)	369,754	4.30	▼1.07	1	0
People's New Party (PNP)	102,992	1.20	New	0	New
New Party Nippon (Nippon)	79,792	0.93	▼2.81	0	0
Happiness Realization Party (HRP)	44,162	0.51	New	0	New
Total	8,594,503	100.00		22	
Invalid votes	154,200	1.76			
Turnout	8,748,703	67.26	▲0.97		
Registered voters	13,007,629				

=== 2005 ===
2005 results in the Southern Kanto PR block
Party	Votes	Swing	%	Seats	+/–
Liberal Democratic Party (LDP)	3,510,617	42.40	▲7.78	10	▲2
Democratic Party of Japan (DPJ)	2,439,549	29.47	▼10.51	7	▼2
Komeito	1,007,504	12.17	▼1.58	3	0
Japanese Communist Party (JCP)	566,945	6.85	▼0.54	1	0
Social Democratic Party (SDP)	444,753	5.37	▲1.11	1	0
New Party Nippon (Nippon)	309,851	3.74	New	0	New
Total	8,279,219	100.00		22	
Invalid votes	141,716	1.68			
Turnout	8,420,935	66.29	▲8.69		
Registered voters	12,702,953				

=== 2003 ===
2003 results in the Southern Kanto PR block
Party	Votes	Swing	%	Seats	+/–
Democratic Party of Japan (DPJ)	2,819,165	39.98	▲12.29	9	▲3
Liberal Democratic Party (LDP)	2,441,590	34.62	▲9.88	8	▲2
Komeito	969,464	13.75	▲1.32	3	0
Japanese Communist Party (JCP)	521,309	7.39	▼4.14	1	▼1
Social Democratic Party (SDP)	300,599	4.26	▼5.30	1	▼1
Total	7,052,127	100.00		22	▲1
Invalid votes	173,597	2.40			
Turnout	7,225,724	57.60	▼1.87		
Registered voters	12,545,306				

=== 2000 ===
2000 results in the Southern Kanto PR block
Party	Votes	Swing	%	Seats	+/–
Democratic Party of Japan (DPJ)	1,940,792	27.68	▲6.48	6	▲1
Liberal Democratic Party (LDP)	1,734,297	24.74	▼4.25	6	▼1
Komeito	871,150	12.43	New	3	New
Liberal Party (LP)	839,845	11.98	New	2	New
Japanese Communist Party (JCP)	808,453	11.53	▼2.51	2	▼1
Social Democratic Party (SDP)	670,141	9.56	▲3.13	2	▲1
Liberal League (LL)	145,858	2.08	▲0.94	0	0
Total	7,010,536	100.00		21	▼2
Invalid votes	226,843	3.13			
Turnout	7,237,379	59.47			
Registered voters	12,170,170				

=== 1996 ===
1996 results in the Southern Kanto PR block
Party	Votes	%	Seats
Liberal Democratic Party (LDP)	1,820,846	28.99	7
New Frontier Party (NFP)	1,667,552	26.55	7
Democratic Party (DP)	1,331,850	21.21	5
Japanese Communist Party (JCP)	881,751	14.04	3
Social Democratic Party (SDP)	403,875	6.43	1
New Socialist Party (NSP)	102,906	1.64	0
Liberal League (LL)	71,756	1.14	0
Total	6,280,536	100.00	23
