= Results of the 2024 Japanese general election =

- 27 October 2024
- All 465 seats in the House of Representatives; 233 seats needed for a majority
Party	Leader	Seats	+/–
LDP	Shigeru Ishiba	191	−68
CDP	Yoshihiko Noda	148	+52
Ishin	Nobuyuki Baba	38	−3
DPP	Yuichiro Tamaki	28	+17
Komeito	Keiichi Ishii	24	−8
Reiwa	Taro Yamamoto	9	+6
JCP	Tomoko Tamura	8	−2
Sanseitō	Sohei Kamiya	3	New
CPJ	Naoki Hyakuta	3	New
Social Democratic	Mizuho Fukushima	1	0
Independents	—	12	0
This lists parties that won seats. See the complete results below.
- Constituency seats
- All 289 seats
Party	Vote %	Seats	+/–
LDP	38.46	132	−55
CDP	29.01	104	+47
Ishin	11.15	23	+7
JCP	6.81	1	0
DPP	4.33	11	+5
Komeito	1.35	4	−5
Social Democratic	0.52	1	0
CPJ	0.29	1	New
Independents	4.67	12	0
This lists parties that won seats. See the complete results below.
- Proportional seats
- All 176 seats
Party	Vote %	Seats	+/–
LDP	26.73	59	−13
CDP	21.20	44	+5
DPP	11.32	17	+12
Komeito	10.93	20	−3
Ishin	9.36	15	−10
Reiwa	6.98	9	+6
JCP	6.16	7	−2
Sanseitō	3.43	3	New
CPJ	2.10	2	New
This lists parties that won seats. See the complete results below.
Results by constituency shaded according to vote strength
Prime Minister before
Shigeru Ishiba; LDP

This article presents detailed results of the 2024 Japanese general election. The results are separated into each of the eleven proportional representation blocks and their corresponding prefectures. In the following tables, candidates elected via single-member district are highlighted in green, while candidates elected via proportional representation are highlighted in red.

== Electoral system ==
The House of Representatives is elected via parallel voting. In the 2024 election, 289 members were elected in single-member districts and 176 via party-list proportional representation in eleven multi-member constituencies, referred to as "PR blocks". Single-member districts are apportioned between prefectures and numbered (1st, 2nd, etc). Candidates may run solely in a single-member district, solely in PR, or both (dual listing). Dual listed candidates must win at least 10% of the vote in their single-member district in order to be eligible for election via PR. Dual listed candidates who win their single-member district race are not eligible for election via PR.

Candidates on PR lists may be ranked sequentially or, if they are dual listed, ranked equally with one another. If ranked equally, the best-loser ratio (sekihairitsu) of each candidate determines the order of election. This number is determined by dividing their single-member district votes by those of the winning candidate in that district. In this way, the losing candidates who performed best will be elected first.

If a party wins more PR seats than they have eligible candidates on their list, the unfilled seats will be distributed to other parties in accordance with the PR formula.

== Hokkaidō block ==
2024 Japanese general election in Hokkaido
- 27 October 2024

All 20 seats to the House of Representatives
	Majority party	Minority party
Party	CDP	LDP
Last election	8 seats	10 seats
Constituency	9	3
PR seats	3	3
Total	12	6
Seat change	▲4	▼4
	Third party	Fourth party
Party	Komeito	DPP
Last election	2 seats	0 seats
Constituency	0	0
PR seats	1	1
Total	1	1
Seat change	▼1	▲1

Single-member constituency results in Hokkaido
Constituency	Previous member		Elected member		Votes	%	Margin	Runner-up	Party	%	Status
Hokkaido 1st	Daiki Michishita	CDP	Daiki Michishita	CDP	108,394	43.3	28,261	Takahiro Katō	LDP	32.0	CDP hold
Hokkaido 2nd	Kenko Matsuki	CDP	Kenko Matsuki	CDP	94,002	40.0	17,167	Yūsuke Takahashi	LDP	32.7	LDP hold
Hokkaido 3rd	Hirohisa Takagi	LDP	Yutaka Arai	CDP	100,136	41.7	17,047	Hirohisa Takagi	LDP	34.6	CDP gain from LDP
Hokkaido 4th	Hiroyuki Nakamura	LDP	Kureha Otsuki	CDP	101,484	45.1	7,394	Hiroyuki Nakamura	LDP	41.8	CDP gain from LDP
Hokkaido 5th	Yoshiaki Wada	LDP	Maki Ikeda	CDP	125,444	51.7	24,551	Yoshiaki Wada	LDP	41.6	CDP gain from LDP
Hokkaido 6th	Kuniyoshi Azuma	CDP	Kuniyoshi Azuma	LDP	100,694	46.9	6,501	Masahito Nishikawa	CDP	43.9	LDP hold
Hokkaido 7th	Yoshitaka Itō	LDP	Takako Suzuki	LDP	77,189	58.4	22,301	Naoko Shinoda	CDP	41.6	LDP hold
Hokkaido 8th	Seiji Osaka	CDP	Seiji Osaka	CDP	97,758	50.8	14,752	Jun Mukōyama	LDP	43.1	CDP hold
Hokkaido 9th	Tatsumaru Yamaoka	CDP	Tatsumaru Yamaoka	CDP	106,007	56.1	43,679	Hideki Matsushita	LDP	33.0	CDP hold
Hokkaido 10th	Hisashi Inatsu	Komei	Hiroshi Kamiya	CDP	78,362	50.8	2,372	Hisashi Inatsu	Komei	49.2	CDP gain from Komei
Hokkaido 11th	Kaori Ishikawa	CDP	Kaori Ishikawa	CDP	84,522	52.2	17,645	Yūko Nakagawa	LDP	41.3	CDP hold
Hokkaido 12th	Arata Takebe	LDP	Arata Takebe	LDP	78,645	52.3	7,037	Eisei Kawaharada	CDP	47.7	LDP hold

Proportional representation results
Party	Votes	Seats	Rank	Elected member	Constituency	Ratio
CDP	694,578 (29.0%)	3	1	Naoko Shinoda	Hokkaido 7th	71.1%
CDP	694,578 (29.0%)	3	3	Masahito Nishikawa	Hokkaido 6th	93.5%
CDP	694,578 (29.0%)	3	3	Eisei Kawaharada	Hokkaido 12th	91.0%
LDP	641,127 (26.8%)	3	1	Yoshitaka Itō		
LDP	641,127 (26.8%)	3	2	Hiroyuki Nakamura	Hokkaido 4th	92.7%
LDP	641,127 (26.8%)	3	2	Jun Mukōyama	Hokkaido 8th	84.9%
Komei	253,344 (10.6%)	1	1	Hidemichi Satō		
DPFP	192,303 (8.0%)	1	1	Hidetake Usuki		

== Tohoku block ==
2024 Japanese general election in Tohoku
- 27 October 2024

All 33 seats to the House of Representatives
	Majority party	Minority party	Third party
Party	CDP	LDP	DPP
Last election	11 seats	22 seats	0 seats
Constituency	11	9	1
PR seats	4	5	1
Total	15	14	2
Seat change	▲4	▼8	▲2
	Fourth party	Fifth party	Sixth party
Party	Komeito	Reiwa	JCP
Last election	1 seat	0 seats	1 seat
Constituency	0	0	0
PR seats	1	1	0
Total	1	1	0
Seat change	0	▲1	▼1
	Seventh party
Party	Ishin
Last election	1 seat
Constituency	0
PR seats	0
Total	0
Seat change	▼1

Single-member constituency results in Tohoku
Constituency	Previous member		Elected member		Votes	%	Margin	Runner-up	Party	%	Status
Aomori 1st	Akinori Eto	LDP	Jun Tsushima	LDP	76,265	46.0	5,054	Sekio Masuta	CDP	43.0	LDP hold
Aomori 2nd	Junichi Kanda	LDP	Junichi Kanda	LDP	82,784	45.4	26,110	Kazuhiko Matsuo	Ind.	31.1	LDP hold
Aomori 3rd	Jiro Kimura	LDP	Hanako Okada	CDP	86,593	49.6	12,745	Jiro Kimura	LDP	42.3	LDP hold
Iwate 1st	Takeshi Shina	CDO	Takeshi Shina	CDP	94,409	61.5	50,786	Hiromasa Yonai	LDP	28.4	CDP hold
Iwate 2nd	Shun'ichi Suzuki	LDP	Shun'ichi Suzuki	LDP	115,774	62.1	45,058	Yukiko Nakamura	CDP	37.9	LDP hold
Iwate 3rd	Takashi Fujiwara	LDP	Ichirō Ozawa	CDP	115,364	57.8	31,017	Takashi Fujiwara	LDP	42.2	CDP gain from LDP
Miyagi 1st	Tōru Doi	LDP	Akiko Okamoto	CDP	115,142	51.7	33,218	Tōru Doi	LDP	36.8	CDP gain from LDP
Miyagi 2nd	Sayuri Kamata	CDP	Sayuri Kamata	CDP	116,390	53.1	44,757	Kenya Akiba	LDP	32.7	CDP hold
Miyagi 3rd	Akihiro Nishimura	LDP	Tsuyoshi Yanagisawa	CDP	82,566	55.2	15,660	Akihiro Nishimura	LDP	44.8	CDP gain from LDP
Miyagi 4th	Shintaro Ito	LDP	Jun Azumi	CDP	102,229	52.1	36,613	Shintaro Ito	LDP	33.4	CDP gain from LDP
Miyagi 5th	Jun Azumi	CDP	Itsunori Onodera	LDP	132,361	74.7	105,859	Tsuneharu Sakai	Ishin	14.9	LDP gain from CDP
Miyagi 6th	Itsunori Onodera	LDP	Seat abolished								LDP loss
Akita 1st	Hiroyuki Togashi	LDP	Hiroyuki Togashi	LDP	60,387	41.7	872	Manabu Terata	CDP	41.1	LDP hold
Akita 2nd	Takashi Midorikawa	CDP	Takashi Midorikawa	CDP	70,895	50.4	5,695	Junji Fukuhara	LDP	46.4	CDP hold
Akita 3rd	Nobuhide Minorikawa	LDP	Toshihide Muraoka	DPFP	83,001	45.0	8,279	Nobuhide Minorikawa	LDP	40.5	DPFP gain from LDP
Yamagata 1st	Toshiaki Endo	LDP	Toshiaki Endo	LDP	92,238	55.5	27,521	Masahiro Harada	CDP	38.9	LDP hold
Yamagata 2nd	Norikazu Suzuki	LDP	Norikazu Suzuki	LDP	105,416	56.7	49,057	Daijiro Kikuchi	DPFP	30.3	LDP hold
Yamagata 3rd	Ayuko Kato	LDP	Ayuko Kato	LDP	93,909	56.1	30,807	Satoru Ishiguro	CDP	37.7	LDP hold
Fukushima 1st	Emi Kaneko	CDP	Emi Kaneko	CDP	124,441	59.6	40,090	Yoshitami Kameoka	LDP	40.4	CDP hold
Fukushima 2nd	Takumi Nemoto	LDP	Kōichirō Genba	CDP	123,256	53.9	30,640	Takumi Nemoto	LDP	40.5	CDP gain from LDP
Fukushima 3rd	Kōichirō Genba	CDP	Shinji Oguma	CDP	96,814	54.8	28,681	Kentarō Uesugi	Ind.	38.6	CDP hold
Fukushima 4th	Shinji Oguma	CDP	Ryutaro Sakamoto	LDP	85,751	46.5	7,043	Yuki Saito	CDP	42.7	LDP gain from CDP
Fukushima 5th	Masayoshi Yoshino	LDP	Seat abolished								LDP loss

Proportional representation results
Party	Votes	Seats	Rank	Elected member	Constituency	Ratio
LDP	1,188,975 (31.4%)	5	1	Akinori Eto		
LDP	1,188,975 (31.4%)	5	2	Chisato Morishita		
LDP	1,188,975 (31.4%)	5	3	Junji Fukuhara	Akita 2nd	91.9%
LDP	1,188,975 (31.4%)	5	3	Nobuhide Minorikawa	Akita 3rd	90.0%
LDP	1,188,975 (31.4%)	5	3	Takumi Nemoto	Fukushima 2nd	75.1%
CDP	993,007 (26.3%)	4	1	Yuki Baba		
CDP	993,007 (26.3%)	4	2	Manabu Terata	Akita 1st	98.5%
CDP	993,007 (26.3%)	4	2	Sekio Masuta	Aomori 1st	93.3%
CDP	993,007 (26.3%)	4	2	Yuki Saito	Fukushima 4th	91.7%
DPFP	396,991 (10.5%)	1	1	Daijiro Kikuchi	Yamagata 2nd	53.4%
Komei	367,341 (9.7%)	1	1	Kenichi Shoji		
Reiwa	271,855 (7.2%)	1	3	Wakako Sawara		

== Northern Kanto block ==
2024 Japanese general election in Northern Kanto
- 27 October 2024

All 51 seats to the House of Representatives
	Majority party	Minority party	Third party
Party	LDP	CDP	DPP
Last election	33 seats	9 seats	2 seats
Constituency	19	9	3
PR seats	7	5	1
Total	26	14	4
Seat change	▼7	▲5	▲2
	Fourth party	Fifth party	Sixth party
Party	Komeito	Reiwa	Ishin
Last election	3 seats	0 seats	2 seats
Constituency	0	0	0
PR seats	3	1	1
Total	3	1	1
Seat change	0	▲1	▼1
	Seventh party	Eighth party
Party	JCP	Ind.
Last election	1 seat	1 seat
Constituency	0	2
PR seats	1	–
Total	1	2
Seat change	0	▲1

Single-member constituency results in Northern Kanto
Constituency	Previous member		Elected member		Votes	%	Margin	Runner-up		%	Status
Ibaraki 1st	Nobuyuki Fukushima	Ind.	Nobuyuki Fukushima	Ind.	94,243	45.0	17,283	Yoshinori Tadokoro	LDP	36.8	Ind. hold
Ibaraki 2nd	Fukushiro Nukaga	LDP	Fukushiro Nukaga	LDP	80,875	59.0	56,298	Toshiaki Imamura	Ishin	17.9	LDP hold
Ibaraki 3rd	Yasuhiro Hanashi	LDP	Yasuhiro Hanashi	LDP	83,667	42.1	20,394	Hiroki Kajioka	CDP	31.8	LDP hold
Ibaraki 4th	Hiroshi Kajiyama	LDP	Hiroshi Kajiyama	LDP	91,019	68.3	65,756	Hiromitsu Muto	Ishin	19.0	LDP hold
Ibaraki 5th	Satoshi Asano	DPFP	Satoshi Asano	DPFP	64,351	53.7	17,634	Akimasa Ishikawa	LDP	39.0	DPFP hold
Ibaraki 6th	Ayano Kunimitsu	LDP	Yamato Aoyama	CDP	120,434	49.3	13,129	Ayano Kunimitsu	LDP	43.9	CDP gain from LDP
Ibaraki 7th	Keiko Nagaoka	LDP	Hayato Nakamura	Ind.	87,187	53.0	9,963	Keiko Nagaoka	LDP	47.0	Ind. gain from LDP
Tochigi 1st	Hajime Funada	LDP	Hajime Funada	LDP	78,333	39.9	15,419	Yuka Itazu	CDP	22.1	LDP hold
Tochigi 2nd	Akio Fukuda	CDP	Akio Fukuda	CDP	68,377	56.8	16,422	Kiyoshi Igarashi	LDP	43.2	CDP hold
Tochigi 3rd	Kazuo Yana	LDP	Kazuo Yana	LDP	45,546	37.4	178	Shintaro Watanabe	Ind.	37.2	LDP hold
Tochigi 4th	Tsutomu Sato	LDP	Takao Fujioka	CDP	96,573	53.4	21,313	Tsutomu Sato	LDP	41.6	CDP gain from LDP
Tochigi 5th	Toshimitsu Motegi	LDP	Toshimitsu Motegi	LDP	99,897	63.0	74,694	Keiko Okamura	JCP	15.9	LDP hold
Gunma 1st	Asako Omi	LDP	Yasutaka Nakasone	LDP	82,455	51.9	26,424	Keiko Shirai	CDP	35.3	LDP hold
Gunma 2nd	Toshiro Ino	LDP	Toshiro Ino	LDP	78,416	53.2	30,165	Takashi Ishizeki	Ind.	32.8	LDP hold
Gunma 3rd	Hiroyoshi Sasagawa	LDP	Hiroyoshi Sasagawa	LDP	74,930	50.1	214	Kaichi Hasegawa	CDP	49.9	LDP hold
Gunma 4th	Tatsuo Fukuda	LDP	Tatsuo Fukuda	LDP	80,130	56.0	33,390	Hiroki Yamada	CDP	32.7	LDP hold
Gunma 5th	Yūko Obuchi	LDP	Yūko Obuchi	LDP	96,580	61.8	59,652	Yumiko Nakajima	Ishin	23.6	LDP hold
Saitama 1st	Hideki Murai	LDP	Hideki Murai	LDP	85,347	41.5	3,213	Koichi Takemasa	CDP	39.9	LDP hold
Saitama 2nd	Yoshitaka Shindō	LDP	Yoshitaka Shindō	LDP	72,467	39.7	29,303	Hideaki Takahashi	Ishin	23.6	LDP hold
Saitama 3rd	Hitoshi Kikawada	LDP	Hitoshi Kikawada	LDP	76,239	42.0	10,136	Chiharu Takeuchi	CDP	36.4	LDP hold
Saitama 4th	Yasushi Hosaka	LDP	Yasushi Hosaka	LDP	82,125	41.8	29,397	Mitsuhiro Kishida	DPFP	26.8	LDP hold
Saitama 5th	Yukio Edano	CDP	Yukio Edano	CDP	107,778	51.0	29,258	Hideki Makihara	LDP	37.0	CDP hold
Saitama 6th	Atsushi Oshima	CDP	Atsushi Oshima	CDP	104,836	51.3	54,411	Kazuyuki Nakane	Ind.	24.7	CDP hold
Saitama 7th	Hideyuki Nakano	LDP	Yasuko Komiyama	CDP	73,293	39.7	6,795	Hideyuki Nakano	LDP	36.0	CDP gain from LDP
Saitama 8th	Masahiko Shibayama	LDP	Masahiko Shibayama	LDP	93,223	43.4	15,643	Tomoko Ichiki	CDP	36.1	LDP hold
Saitama 9th	Taku Otsuka	LDP	Shinji Sugimura	CDP	83,107	41.6	4,296	Taku Otsuka	LDP	39.4	CDP gain from LDP
Saitama 10th	Susumu Yamaguchi	LDP	Yunosuke Sakamoto	CDP	97,591	59.0	29,827	Susumu Yamaguchi	LDP	41.0	CDP gain from LDP
Saitama 11th	Ryuji Koizumi	LDP	Ryuji Koizumi	LDP	91,681	58.1	42,124	Makoto Shimada	CDP	31.4	LDP hold
Saitama 12th	Toshikazu Morita	CDP	Toshikazu Morita	CDP	103,324	57.5	26,929	Atsushi Nonaka	LDP	42.5	CDP hold
Saitama 13th	Shinako Tsuchiya	LDP	Mikihiko Hashimoto	DPFP	61,436	34.1	8,054	Hiromi Mitsubayashi	Ind.	29.6	DPFP gain from LDP
Saitama 14th	Hiromi Mitsubayashi	Ind.	Yoshihiro Suzuki	DPFP	70,608	37.0	10,359	Keiichi Ishii	Komei	31.6	DPFP gain from Ind.
Saitama 15th	Ryosei Tanaka	LDP	Ryosei Tanaka	LDP	73,973	35.6	13,617	Rentaro Takagi	CDP	29.0	LDP hold
Saitama 16th	New seat		Shinako Tsuchiya	LDP	66,909	38.5	2,665	Sota Misumi	CDP	36.9	LDP win

Proportional representation results
Party	Votes	Seats	Rank	Elected member	Constituency	Ratio
LDP	1,603,644 (27.5%)	7	1	Hideyuki Nakano	Saitama 7th	90.7%
LDP	1,603,644 (27.5%)	7	1	Ayano Kunimitsu	Ibaraki 6th	89.0%
LDP	1,603,644 (27.5%)	7	1	Keiko Nagaoka	Ibaraki 7th	88.5%
LDP	1,603,644 (27.5%)	7	1	Yoshinori Tadokoro	Ibaraki 1st	81.6%
LDP	1,603,644 (27.5%)	7	1	Tsutomu Sato	Tochigi 4th	77.9%
LDP	1,603,644 (27.5%)	7	1	Kiyoshi Igarashi	Tochigi 2nd	75.9%
LDP	1,603,644 (27.5%)	7	1	Atsushi Nonaka	Saitama 12th	73.9%
CDP	1,283,911 (22.0%)	5	1	Kaichi Hasegawa	Gunma 3rd	99.7%
CDP	1,283,911 (22.0%)	5	1	Koichi Takemasa	Saitama 1st	96.2%
CDP	1,283,911 (22.0%)	5	1	Sota Misumi	Saitama 16th	96.0%
CDP	1,283,911 (22.0%)	5	1	Chiharu Takeuchi	Saitama 3rd	86.7%
CDP	1,283,911 (22.0%)	5	1	Tomoko Ichiki	Saitama 8th	83.2%
DPFP	686,080 (11.8%)	2 → 1 (Note: One seat forfeited due to lack of candidates.)	1	Mitsuhiro Kishida	Saitama 4th	64.2%
Komei	674,694 (11.6%)	2 → 3	1	Keiichi Koshimizu		
Komei	674,694 (11.6%)	2 → 3	2	Takahiro Fukushige		
Komei	674,694 (11.6%)	2 → 3	3	Ryoji Yamaguchi		
Reiwa	419,511 (7.2%)	1	1	Takashi Takai	Saitama 13th	36.1%
Ishin	391,136 (6.7%)	1	1	Hideaki Takahashi	Saitama 2nd	59.5%
JCP	354,915 (6.1%)	1	1	Tetsuya Shiokawa		

== Southern Kanto block ==
2024 Japanese general election in Southern Kanto
- 27 October 2024

All 58 seats to the House of Representatives
	Majority party	Minority party	Third party
Party	CDP	LDP	DPP
Last election	16 seats	31 seats	1 seat
Constituency	19	17	0
PR seats	6	7	3
Total	25	24	3
Seat change	▲9	▼7	▲2
	Fourth party	Fifth party	Sixth party
Party	Komeito	Ishin	Reiwa
Last election	2 seats	3 seats	1 seat
Constituency	0	0	0
PR seats	2	2	1
Total	2	2	1
Seat change	0	▼1	0
	Seventh party	Eighth party
Party	JCP	Sanseito
Last election	1 seat	New
Constituency	0	0
PR seats	1	1
Total	1	1
Seat change	0	▲1

Single-member constituency results in Southern Kanto
Constituency	Previous member		Elected member		Votes	%	Margin	Runner-up		%	Status
Chiba 1st	Kaname Tajima	CDP	Kaname Tajima	CDP	107,439	47.3	40,007	Hiroaki Kadoyama	LDP	29.7	CDP hold
Chiba 2nd	Takayuki Kobayashi	LDP	Takayuki Kobayashi	LDP	103,690	68.1	55,190	Shiraishi Chiyo	JCP	31.9	LDP hold
Chiba 3rd	Hirokazu Matsuno	LDP	Hirokazu Matsuno	LDP	67,308	41.2	3,139	Kazumasa Okajima	CDP	39.2	LDP hold
Chiba 4th	Yoshihiko Noda	CDP	Hideyuki Mizunuma	CDP	90,011	43.3	23,382	Tetsuya Kimura	LDP	32.1	CDP hold
Chiba 5th	Arfiya Eri	LDP	Kentaro Yazaki	CDP	66,031	30.6	6,395	Arfiya Eri	LDP	27.6	CDP gain from LDP
Chiba 6th	Hiromichi Watanabe	LDP	Junko Ando	CDP	71,555	34.4	1,340	Hiromichi Watanabe	LDP	33.8	CDP gain from LDP
Chiba 7th	Ken Saitō	LDP	Ken Saitō	LDP	82,606	54.2	30,857	Kota Hirado	DPFP	33.9	LDP hold
Chiba 8th	Satoshi Honjō	CDP	Satoshi Honjō	CDP	78,678	42.9	19,608	Izumi Matsumoto	LDP	32.2	CDP hold
Chiba 9th	Soichiro Okuno	CDP	Soichiro Okuno	CDP	86,335	43.9	20,372	Hisato Tamiya	LDP	33.5	CDP hold
Chiba 10th	Motoo Hayashi	LDP	Masaaki Koike	LDP	69,563	43.8	1,643	Hajime Yatagawa	CDP	42.8	LDP hold
Chiba 11th	Eisuke Mori	LDP	Eisuke Mori	LDP	92,187	57.4	46,571	Ryo Tagaya	Reiwa	28.4	LDP hold
Chiba 12th	Yasukazu Hamada	LDP	Yasukazu Hamada	LDP	105,510	56.5	60,412	Takeshi Hidaka	CDP	24.2	LDP hold
Chiba 13th	Hisashi Matsumoto	LDP	Hisashi Matsumoto	LDP	96,024	43.8	3,523	Shin Miyakawa	CDP	42.2	LDP hold
Chiba 14th	New seat		Yoshihiko Noda	CDP	145,821	66.4	94,098	Kyosuke Takahashi	LDP	23.6	CDP win
Kanagawa 1st	Go Shinohara	Ind.	Go Shinohara	CDP	91,809	41.1	22,878	Jun Matsumoto	LDP	30.9	CDP hold
Kanagawa 2nd	Yoshihide Suga	LDP	Yoshihide Suga	LDP	119,548	52.2	72,326	Tozaburo Yanagiya	CDP	20.6	LDP hold
Kanagawa 3rd	Kenji Nakanishi	LDP	Kenji Nakanishi	LDP	92,125	40.5	20,661	Taketo Nakamura	CDP	31.5	LDP hold
Kanagawa 4th	Yuki Waseda	CDP	Yuki Waseda	CDP	96,874	51.5	52,858	Tomohiro Yamamoto	LDP	23.4	CDP hold
Kanagawa 5th	Manabu Sakai	LDP	Manabu Sakai	LDP	80,495	40.7	13,096	Makoto Yamazaki	CDP	34.1	LDP hold
Kanagawa 6th	Naoki Furukawa	LDP	Yoichiro Aoyagi	CDP	80,207	40.3	926	Naoki Furukawa	LDP	39.8	CDP gain from LDP
Kanagawa 7th	Keisuke Suzuki	LDP	Kazuma Nakatani	CDP	71,913	43.4	10,576	Keisuke Suzuki	LDP	37.0	CDP gain from LDP
Kanagawa 8th	Kenji Eda	CDP	Kenji Eda	CDP	119,971	51.4	24,139	Hidehiro Mitani	LDP	41.1	CDP hold
Kanagawa 9th	Hirofumi Ryu	CDP	Hirofumi Ryu	CDP	93,878	49.6	41,520	Norihiro Nakayama	LDP	27.7	CDP hold
Kanagawa 10th	Kazunori Tanaka	LDP	Kazunori Tanaka	LDP	57,380	34.6	6,259	Ryuna Kanemura	Ishin	30.9	LDP hold
Kanagawa 11th	Shinjirō Koizumi	LDP	Shinjirō Koizumi	LDP	129,779	72.4	104,929	Minoru Tameso	JCP	13.9	LDP hold
Kanagawa 12th	Tomoko Abe	CDP	Tomoko Abe	CDP	84,310	39.7	18,626	Tsuyoshi Hoshino	LDP	30.9	CDP hold
Kanagawa 13th	Hideshi Futori	CDP	Hideshi Futori	CDP	88,833	47.1	28,596	Koichiro Maruta	LDP	32.0	CDP hold
Kanagawa 14th	Jiro Akama	LDP	Jiro Akama	LDP	81,428	39.6	7,190	Yoshihiro Nagatomo	CDP	36.1	LDP hold
Kanagawa 15th	Taro Kono	LDP	Taro Kono	LDP	128,881	55.6	88,901	Katsumi Sasaki	SDP	17.2	LDP hold
Kanagawa 16th	Yuichi Goto	CDP	Yuichi Goto	CDP	100,677	50.4	33,725	Hiroyuki Yoshiie	LDP	33.5	CDP hold
Kanagawa 17th	Karen Makishima	LDP	Karen Makishima	LDP	115,235	50.9	4,174	Naomi Sasaki	CDP	49.1	LDP hold
Kanagawa 18th	Daishiro Yamagiwa	LDP	Hajime Sono	CDP	68,632	30.7	16,036	Yoshitaka Nishioka	DPFP	23.5	CDP gain from LDP
Kanagawa 19th	New seat		Tsuyoshi Kusama	LDP	64,315	31.3	13,458	Takashi Sato	CDP	24.8	LDP win
Kanagawa 20th	New seat		Sayuri Otsuka	CDP	83,282	46.8	20,065	Akira Amari	LDP	35.5	CDP win
Yamanashi 1st	Shinichi Nakatani	LDP	Katsuhito Nakajima	CDP	107,050	45.9	7,921	Shinichi Nakatani	LDP	42.5	CDP gain from LDP
Yamanashi 2nd	Noriko Horiuchi	LDP	Noriko Horiuchi	LDP	99,080	73.6	63,511	Reiko Okubo	JCP	26.4	LDP hold

Proportional representation results
Party	Votes	Seats	Rank	Elected member	Constituency	Ratio
LDP	1,822,230 (25.4%)	7	1	Naoki Furukawa	Kanagawa 6th	98.8%
LDP	1,822,230 (25.4%)	7	1	Shinichi Nakatani	Yamanashi 1st	92.6%
LDP	1,822,230 (25.4%)	7	1	Arfiya Eri	Chiba 5th	90.3%
LDP	1,822,230 (25.4%)	7	1	Keisuke Suzuki	Kanagawa 7th	85.2%
LDP	1,822,230 (25.4%)	7	1	Hidehiro Mitani	Kanagawa 8th	79.8%
LDP	1,822,230 (25.4%)	7	1	Tsuyoshi Hoshino	Kanagawa 12th	77.9%
LDP	1,822,230 (25.4%)	7	1	Daishiro Yamagiwa	Kanagawa 18th	76.6%
CDP	1,700,535 (23.7%)	6	1	Hajime Yatagawa	Chiba 10th	97.6%
CDP	1,700,535 (23.7%)	6	1	Naomi Sasaki	Kanagawa 17th	96.3%
CDP	1,700,535 (23.7%)	6	1	Shin Miyakawa	Chiba 13th	96.3%
CDP	1,700,535 (23.7%)	6	1	Kazumasa Okajima	Chiba 3rd	95.3%
CDP	1,700,535 (23.7%)	6	1	Yoshihiro Nagatomo	Kanagawa 14th	91.1%
CDP	1,700,535 (23.7%)	6	1	Makoto Yamazaki	Kanagawa 5th	83.7%
DPFP	907,123 (12.6%)	3	1	Jesús Fukasaku	Kanagawa 19th	78.6%
DPFP	907,123 (12.6%)	3	1	Junko Okano	Chiba 5th	77.2%
DPFP	907,123 (12.6%)	3	1	Yoshitaka Nishioka	Kanagawa 18th	76.6%
Komei	729,980 (10.2%)	2	1	Hideo Tsunoda		
Komei	729,980 (10.2%)	2	2	Mitsuko Numazaki		
Ishin	536,161 (7.5%)	2	1	Ryuna Kanemura	Kanagawa 10th	89.0%
Ishin	536,161 (7.5%)	2	1	Kenta Fujimaki	Chiba 6th	42.5%
Reiwa	472,519 (6.6%)	1	1	Ryo Tagaya	Chiba 11th	49.4%
JCP	437,724 (6.1%)	1	1	Kazuo Shii		
Sansei	267,145 (3.7%)	1	1	Atsushi Suzuki		

== Tokyo block ==
2024 Japanese general election in Tokyo
- 27 October 2024

All 49 seats to the House of Representatives
	Majority party	Minority party	Third party
Party	CDP	LDP	DPP
Last election	12 seats	21 seats	0 seats
Constituency	15	11	0
PR seats	5	5	3
Total	20	16	3
Seat change	▲8	▼5	▲3
	Fourth party	Fifth party	Sixth party
Party	Komeito	Ishin	Reiwa
Last election	3 seats	2 seats	1 seat
Constituency	1	0	0
PR seats	2	2	1
Total	3	2	1
Seat change	0	0	0
	Seventh party	Eighth party
Party	JCP	Ind.
Last election	2 seats	1 seat
Constituency	0	3
PR seats	1	–
Total	1	3
Seat change	▼1	▲2

Single-member constituency results in Tokyo
Constituency	Previous member		Elected member		Votes	%	Margin	Runner-up		%	Status
Tokyo 1st	Miki Yamada	LDP	Banri Kaieda	CDP	56,979	32.0	1,939	Miki Yamada	LDP	30.9	CDP gain from LDP
Tokyo 2nd	Kiyoto Tsuji	LDP	Kiyoto Tsuji	LDP	66,050	37.1	17,523	Kiichirō Hatoyama	DPFP	27.3	LDP hold
Tokyo 3rd	Jin Matsubara	Ind.	Hirotaka Ishihara	LDP	61,660	30.6	7,482	Yumiko Abe	CDP	26.9	LDP gain from Ind.
Tokyo 4th	Masaaki Taira	LDP	Masaaki Taira	LDP	86,773	40.2	34,963	Masae Ido	DPFP	24.0	LDP hold
Tokyo 5th	Yoshio Tezuka	CDP	Yoshio Tezuka	CDP	83,016	39.4	13,992	Kenji Wakamiya	LDP	32.7	CDP hold
Tokyo 6th	Takayuki Ochiai	CDP	Takayuki Ochiai	CDP	107,222	47.4	43,323	Miwa Tsuchiya	LDP	28.3	CDP hold
Tokyo 7th	Akira Nagatsuma	CDP	Akihiro Matsuo	CDP	86,252	41.9	30,404	Tamayo Marukawa	LDP	27.1	CDP hold
Tokyo 8th	Harumi Yoshida	CDP	Harumi Yoshida	CDP	116,426	51.1	41,463	Hiroko Kado	LDP	32.9	CDP hold
Tokyo 9th	Issei Yamagishi	CDP	Issei Yamagishi	CDP	75,474	44.1	10,676	Isshu Sugawara	Ind.	37.9	CDP hold
Tokyo 10th	Hayato Suzuki	LDP	Hayato Suzuki	LDP	93,490	38.6	591	Yosuke Suzuki	CDP	38.4	LDP hold
Tokyo 11th	Hakubun Shimomura	Ind.	Yukihiko Akutsu	CDP	80,947	41.0	23,672	Hakubun Shimomura	Ind.	29.0	CDP gain from Ind.
Tokyo 12th	Akihiro Ota	Komei	Kei Takagi	LDP	68,878	33.3	16,645	Tsukasa Abe	Ishin	25.2	LDP gain from Komei
Tokyo 13th	Shin Tsuchida	LDP	Shin Tsuchida	LDP	75,050	39.6	16,665	Yosuke Mori	DPFP	30.8	LDP hold
Tokyo 14th	Midori Matsushima	LDP	Midori Matsushima	LDP	75,862	36.3	22,651	Nana Ito	DPFP	25.5	LDP hold
Tokyo 15th	Natsumi Sakai	CDP	Natsumi Sakai	CDP	66,791	27.5	1,125	Genki Sudo	Ind.	27.1	CDP hold
Tokyo 16th	Hideo Ōnishi	LDP	Yohei Onishi	LDP	71,728	37.3	11,014	Katsuyuki Shibata	CDP	31.6	LDP hold
Tokyo 17th	Katsuei Hirasawa	Ind.	Katsuei Hirasawa	Ind.	64,495	34.8	12,520	Yoriko Madoka	DPFP	28.0	Ind. hold
Tokyo 18th	Naoto Kan	CDP	Kaoru Fukuda	LDP	99,002	42.3	2,182	Reiko Matsushita	CDP	41.4	LDP gain from CDP
Tokyo 19th	Yoshinori Suematsu	CDP	Yoshinori Suematsu	CDP	76,899	39.4	2,464	Yohei Matsumoto	LDP	38.2	CDP hold
Tokyo 20th	Seiji Kihara	LDP	Seiji Kihara	LDP	93,390	43.0	27,955	Kentaro Onishi	DPFP	30.1	LDP hold
Tokyo 21st	Kiyoshi Odawara	Ind.	Masako Ōkawara	CDP	90,724	42.1	21,303	Kiyoshi Odawara	Ind.	32.2	CDP gain from Ind.
Tokyo 22nd	Tatsuya Ito	LDP	Ikuo Yamahana	CDP	99,790	40.2	3,042	Tatsuya Ito	LDP	39.0	CDP gain from LDP
Tokyo 23rd	Masanobu Ogura	LDP	Shunsuke Ito	CDP	111,851	59.0	40,697	Osamu Yoshihara	LDP	37.6	CDP gain from LDP
Tokyo 24th	Kōichi Hagiuda	Ind.	Kōichi Hagiuda	Ind.	79,216	38.6	7,533	Yoshifu Arita	CDP	35.0	Ind. hold
Tokyo 25th	Shinji Inoue	LDP	Shinji Inoue	LDP	110,488	53.1	69,408	Taro Miyazaki	Ishin	19.7	LDP hold
Tokyo 26th	New seat		Jin Matsubara	Ind.	108,174	45.6	39,606	Ueki Imaoka	LDP	28.9	Ind. win
Tokyo 27th	New seat		Akira Nagatsuma	CDP	112,388	54.6	52,436	Yuichi Kurosaki	LDP	29.1	CDP win
Tokyo 28th	New seat		Satoshi Takamatsu	CDP	50,626	29.1	336	Takao Ando	LDP	28.9	CDP win
Tokyo 29th	New seat		Mitsunari Okamoto	Komei	60,100	33.2	12,104	Taketsuka Kimura	CDP	26.5	Komei win
Tokyo 30th	New seat		Eri Igarashi	CDP	98,146	42.0	6,348	Akihisa Nagashima	LDP	39.3	CDP win

Proportional representation results
Party	Votes	Seats	Rank	Elected member	Constituency	Ratio
LDP	1,498,632 (23.6%)	5	1	Takao Ando	Tokyo 28th	99.3%
LDP	1,498,632 (23.6%)	5	2	Tatsuya Ito	Tokyo 22nd	96.9%
LDP	1,498,632 (23.6%)	5	2	Yohei Matsumoto	Tokyo 19th	96.7%
LDP	1,498,632 (23.6%)	5	2	Kōki Ōzora	Tokyo 15th	93.9%
LDP	1,498,632 (23.6%)	5	2	Akihisa Nagashima	Tokyo 18th	93.5%
CDP	1,298,166 (20.5%)	5	1	Yosuke Suzuki	Tokyo 10th	99.3%
CDP	1,298,166 (20.5%)	5	1	Reiko Matsushita	Tokyo 18th	97.7%
CDP	1,298,166 (20.5%)	5	1	Yoshifu Arita	Tokyo 24th	90.4%
CDP	1,298,166 (20.5%)	5	1	Yumiko Abe	Tokyo 3rd	87.8%
CDP	1,298,166 (20.5%)	5	1	Katsuyuki Shibata	Tokyo 16th	84.6%
DPFP	945,460 (14.9%)	3	1	Yoriko Madoka	Tokyo 17th	80.5%
DPFP	945,460 (14.9%)	3	1	Yosuke Mori	Tokyo 13th	77.7%
DPFP	945,460 (14.9%)	3	1	Kiichirō Hatoyama	Tokyo 2nd	73.4%
Komei	573,191 (9.0%)	2	1	Koichi Kasai		
Komei	573,191 (9.0%)	2	2	Eriko Omori		
Ishin	516,610 (8.1%)	2	1	Tsukasa Abe	Tokyo 12th	75.8%
Ishin	516,610 (8.1%)	2	1	Sachiko Inokuchi	Tokyo 17th	65.7%
JCP	498,565 (7.9%)	1	1	Tomoko Tamura		
Reiwa	451,865 (7.1%)	1	1	Mari Kushibuchi	Tokyo 14th	33.3%

== Hokuriku-Shin'etsu block ==
2024 Japanese general election in Hokuriku-Shin'etsu
- 27 October 2024

All 28 seats to the House of Representatives
	Majority party	Minority party	Third party
Party	CDP	LDP	DPP
Last election	7 seats	20 seats	0 seats
Constituency	10	8	0
PR seats	3	4	1
Total	13	12	1
Seat change	▲6	▼8	▲1
	Fourth party	Fifth party
Party	Komeito	Ishin
Last election	1 seat	1 seat
Constituency	0	0
PR seats	1	1
Total	1	1
Seat change	0	0

Single-member constituency results in Hokuriku-Shin'etsu
Constituency	Previous member		Elected member		Votes	%	Margin	Runner-up		%	Status
Niigata 1st	Chinami Nishimura	CDP	Chinami Nishimura	CDP	99,487	52.7	38,462	Ichiro Tsukada	LDP	32.3	CDP hold
Niigata 2nd	Kenichi Hosoda	Ind.	Makiko Kikuta	CDP	123,334	56.2	56,210	Kenichi Hosoda	Ind.	30.6	CDP gain from Ind.
Niigata 3rd	Hiroaki Saito	LDP	Takahiro Kuroiwa	CDP	105,275	49.3	10,291	Hiroaki Saito	LDP	44.5	CDP gain from LDP
Niigata 4th	Makiko Kikuta	CDP	Ryuichi Yoneyama	CDP	93,764	44.9	22,092	Eiichiro Washio	LDP	34.3	CDP hold
Niigata 5th	Ryuichi Yoneyama	CDP	Mamoru Umetani	CDP	114,429	55.3	21,840	Shuichi Takatori	LDP	44.7	CDP hold
Niigata 6th	Mamoru Umetani	CDP	Seat abolished								CDP loss
Toyama 1st	Hiroaki Tabata	LDP	Hiroaki Tabata	LDP	45,917	35.1	738	Toshihiro Yama	CDP	34.5	LDP hold
Toyama 2nd	Eishun Ueda	LDP	Eishun Ueda	LDP	73,872	59.3	32,416	Yasuharu Koshikawa	CDP	33.3	LDP hold
Toyama 3rd	Keiichiro Tachibana	LDP	Keiichiro Tachibana	LDP	131,549	66.6	84,873	Kouta Okubo	DPFP	23.6	LDP hold
Ishikawa 1st	Takuo Komori	LDP	Takuo Komori	LDP	64,997	36.3	13,491	Atsushi Arai	CDP	28.7	LDP hold
Ishikawa 2nd	Hajime Sasaki	LDP	Hajime Sasaki	LDP	100,617	57.8	38,029	Tsuneko Oyamada	CDP	36.0	LDP hold
Ishikawa 3rd	Shoji Nishida	LDP	Kazuya Kondo	CDP	77,247	54.4	15,939	Shoji Nishida	LDP	43.2	CDP gain from LDP
Fukui 1st	Tomomi Inada	LDP	Tomomi Inada	LDP	86,906	43.9	16,578	Tsubasa Hatano	CDP	35.5	LDP hold
Fukui 2nd	Tsuyoshi Takagi	Ind.	Hideyuki Tsuji	CDP	54,100	36.3	15,351	Takeshi Saiki	Ishin	26.0	CDP gain from Ind.
Nagano 1st	Kenta Wakabayashi	LDP	Takashi Shinohara	CDP	105,231	46.3	16,439	Kenta Wakabayashi	LDP	39.0	CDP gain from LDP
Nagano 2nd	Mitsu Shimojo	CDP	Mitsu Shimojo	CDP	98,664	48.4	44,399	Shunsuke Mutai	LDP	26.6	CDP hold
Nagano 3rd	Yosei Ide	LDP	Takeshi Kozu	CDP	121,594	55.0	22,163	Yosei Ide	LDP	45.0	CDP gain from LDP
Nagano 4th	Shigeyuki Goto	LDP	Shigeyuki Goto	LDP	75,713	60.2	25,708	Ryosuke Takeda	JCP	39.8	LDP hold
Nagano 5th	Ichiro Miyashita	LDP	Ichiro Miyashita	LDP	78,139	48.4	9,489	Junta Fukuda	CDP	42.5	LDP hold

Proportional representation results
Party	Votes	Seats	Rank	Elected member	Constituency	Ratio
LDP	1,053,516 (32.3%)	4	1	Isato Kunisada		
LDP	1,053,516 (32.3%)	4	2	Hiroaki Saito	Niigata 3rd	90.2%
LDP	1,053,516 (32.3%)	4	2	Yosei Ide	Nagano 3rd	81.7%
LDP	1,053,516 (32.3%)	4	2	Shoji Nishida	Ishikawa 3rd	79.3%
CDP	818,773 (25.1%)	3	1	Toshihiro Yama	Toyama 1st	98.3%
CDP	818,773 (25.1%)	3	1	Junta Fukuda	Nagano 5th	87.8%
CDP	818,773 (25.1%)	3	1	Tsubasa Hatano	Fukui 1st	80.9%
DPFP	341,114 (10.5%)	1	1	Kai Odake	Ishikawa 1st	37.4%
Komei	258,634 (7.9%)	1	1	Hiromasa Nakagawa		
Ishin	228,617 (7.0%)	1	1	Takeshi Saiki	Fukui 2nd	71.6%

== Tokai block ==
2024 Japanese general election in Tokai
- 27 October 2024

All 54 seats to the House of Representatives
	Majority party	Minority party	Third party
Party	LDP	CDP	DPP
Last election	33 seats	11 seats	2 seats
Constituency	13	14	5
PR seats	7	6	1
Total	20	20	6
Seat change	▼13	▲9	▲4
	Fourth party	Fifth party	Sixth party
Party	Komeito	Reiwa	CPJ
Last election	3 seats	0 seats	New
Constituency	0	0	1
PR seats	2	2	1
Total	2	2	2
Seat change	▼1	▲2	▲2
	Seventh party	Eighth party
Party	Ishin	JCP
Last election	2 seats	1 seat
Constituency	0	0
PR seats	1	1
Total	1	1
Seat change	▼1	0

Single-member constituency results in Tokai
Constituency	Previous member		Elected member		Votes	%	Margin	Runner-up		%	Status
Gifu 1st	Seiko Noda	LDP	Seiko Noda	LDP	100,226	67.5	51,901	Toru Yamakoshi	JCP	32.5	LDP hold
Gifu 2nd	Yasufumi Tanahashi	LDP	Yasufumi Tanahashi	LDP	91,183	61.9	57,549	Keiji Mio	JCP	22.8	LDP hold
Gifu 3rd	Yoji Muto	LDP	Yoji Muto	LDP	98,370	46.8	34,331	Akihiro Senda	DPFP	30.4	LDP hold
Gifu 4th	Shunpei Kaneko	LDP	Masato Imai	CDP	114,032	57.3	28,903	Shunpei Kaneko	LDP	42.7	CDP gain from LDP
Gifu 5th	Keiji Furuya	LDP	Keiji Furuya	LDP	73,679	48.3	14,706	Satoshi Mano	CDP	38.6	LDP hold
Shizuoka 1st	Yōko Kamikawa	LDP	Yōko Kamikawa	LDP	114,278	56.8	66,903	Miho Takahashi	CDP	23.6	LDP hold
Shizuoka 2nd	Tatsunori Ibayashi	LDP	Tatsunori Ibayashi	LDP	113,419	55.0	43,288	Takeyuki Suzuki	CDP	34.0	LDP hold
Shizuoka 3rd	Nobuhiro Koyama	CDP	Nobuhiro Koyama	CDP	92,072	43.2	30,473	Yuzo Yamamoto	LDP	28.9	CDP hold
Shizuoka 4th	Yoichi Fukazawa	LDP	Ken Tanaka	DPFP	82,448	50.8	2,647	Yoichi Fukazawa	LDP	49.2	DPFP gain from LDP
Shizuoka 5th	Goshi Hosono	LDP	Goshi Hosono	LDP	141,021	63.2	74,409	Kazuyuki Toyama	CDP	29.8	LDP hold
Shizuoka 6th	Takaaki Katsumata	LDP	Shu Watanabe	CDP	104,222	46.3	4,134	Takaaki Katsumata	LDP	44.4	CDP gain from LDP
Shizuoka 7th	Minoru Kiuchi	LDP	Minoru Kiuchi	LDP	115,175	63.3	60,386	Yuta Hiyoshi	CDP	30.1	LDP hold
Shizuoka 8th	Kentaro Genma	CDP	Kentaro Genma	CDP	108,212	52.4	45,879	Daisuke Inaba	LDP	30.2	CDP hold
Aichi 1st	Hiromichi Kumada	LDP	Takashi Kawamura	CPJ	95,613	46.6	47,309	Tsunehiko Yoshida	CDP	23.6	CPJ gain from LDP
Aichi 2nd	Motohisa Furukawa	DPFP	Motohisa Furukawa	DPFP	121,739	58.5	71,544	Takamoto Nakagawa	LDP	24.1	DPFP hold
Aichi 3rd	Shoichi Kondo	CDP	Shoichi Kondo	CDP	103,624	47.0	49,425	Yoshihiko Mizuno	LDP	24.6	CDP hold
Aichi 4th	Shōzō Kudō	LDP	Yoshio Maki	CDP	63,668	36.4	9,283	Shōzō Kudō	LDP	31.1	CDP gain from LDP
Aichi 5th	Kenji Kanda	LDP	Atsushi Nishikawa	CDP	54,818	34.6	18,156	Kenji Kanda	LDP	23.1	CDP gain from LDP
Aichi 6th	Hideki Niwa	LDP	Hideki Niwa	LDP	92,083	51.7	59,475	Yukichi Maeda	Ind.	18.3	LDP hold
Aichi 7th	Junji Suzuki	LDP	Saria Hino	DPFP	111,406	55.9	40,230	Junji Suzuki	LDP	35.7	DPFP gain from LDP
Aichi 8th	Tadahiko Ito	LDP	Yutaka Banno	CDP	115,282	49.7	19,438	Tadahiko Ito	LDP	41.3	CDP gain from LDP
Aichi 9th	Yasumasa Nagasaka	LDP	Mitsunori Okamoto	CDP	91,152	48.0	12,426	Yasumasa Nagasaka	LDP	41.5	CDP gain from LDP
Aichi 10th	Tetsuma Esaki	LDP	Norimasa Fujiwara	CDP	59,691	34.7	162	Shinji Wakayama	LDP	34.6	CDP gain from LDP
Aichi 11th	Tetsuya Yagi	LDP	Midori Tanno	DPFP	134,528	56.9	43,684	Tetsuya Yagi	LDP	38.4	DPFP gain from LDP
Aichi 12th	Kazuhiko Shigetoku	CDP	Kazuhiko Shigetoku	CDP	126,940	50.5	40,915	Shuhei Aoyama	LDP	34.2	CDP hold
Aichi 13th	Kensuke Onishi	CDP	Kensuke Onishi	CDP	137,944	56.3	47,730	Taku Ishii	LDP	36.8	CDP hold
Aichi 14th	Soichiro Imaeda	LDP	Soichiro Imaeda	LDP	90,334	54.7	25,571	Rie Otake	CDP	39.2	LDP hold
Aichi 15th	Yukinori Nemoto	LDP	Yukinori Nemoto	LDP	71,012	38.7	26,067	Kenichiro Seki	Ishin	24.5	LDP hold
Aichi 16th	New seat		Toru Fukuta	DPFP	65,923	32.7	2,828	Akiyoshi Inukai	Komei	31.3	DPFP win
Mie 1st	Norihisa Tamura	LDP	Norihisa Tamura	LDP	107,926	57.6	44,156	Wakako Fukumori	CDP	34.0	LDP hold
Mie 2nd	Hideto Kawasaki	LDP	Kosuke Shimono	CDP	90,930	42.0	5,067	Hideto Kawasaki	LDP	39.7	CDP gain from LDP
Mie 3rd	Katsuya Okada	CDP	Katsuya Okada	CDP	137,953	60.9	81,323	Masataka Ishihara	LDP	25.0	CDP hold
Mie 4th	Eikei Suzuki	LDP	Eikei Suzuki	LDP	96,619	60.2	43,259	Yoichiro Aonuma	CDP	33.2	LDP hold

Proportional representation results
Party	Votes	Seats	Rank	Elected member	Constituency	Ratio
LDP	1,717,737 (26.4%)	6 → 7	1	Shinji Wakayama	Aichi 10th	99.7%
LDP	1,717,737 (26.4%)	6 → 7	1	Yoichi Fukazawa	Shizuoka 4th	96.7%
LDP	1,717,737 (26.4%)	6 → 7	1	Takaaki Katsumata	Shizuoka 6th	96.0%
LDP	1,717,737 (26.4%)	6 → 7	1	Hideto Kawasaki	Mie 2nd	94.4%
LDP	1,717,737 (26.4%)	6 → 7	1	Yasumasa Nagasaka	Aichi 9th	86.3%
LDP	1,717,737 (26.4%)	6 → 7	1	Shōzō Kudō	Aichi 4th	85.4%
LDP	1,717,737 (26.4%)	6 → 7	1	Tadahiko Ito	Aichi 8th	83.1%
CDP	1,474,091 (22.6%)	5 → 6	1	Isao Matsuda	Aichi 16th	93.7%
CDP	1,474,091 (22.6%)	5 → 6	1	Satoshi Mano	Gifu 5th	80.0%
CDP	1,474,091 (22.6%)	5 → 6	1	Rie Otake	Aichi 14th	71.6%
CDP	1,474,091 (22.6%)	5 → 6	1	Takeyuki Suzuki	Shizuoka 2nd	61.8%
CDP	1,474,091 (22.6%)	5 → 6	1	Chiho Koyama	Aichi 15th	60.3%
CDP	1,474,091 (22.6%)	5 → 6	1	Wakako Fukumori	Mie 1st	59.0%
DPFP	856,909 (13.2%)	3 → 1 (Note: Two seats forfeited due to lack of candidates.)	1	Akihiro Senda	Gifu 3rd	65.1%
Komei	665,939 (10.2%)	2	1	Yasuhiro Nakagawa		
Komei	665,939 (10.2%)	2	2	Katsuhide Nishizono		
Reiwa	506,112 (7.8%)	2	1	Naoto Sakaguchi	Gifu 3rd	48.7%
Reiwa	506,112 (7.8%)	2	4	Hideaki Uemura		
Ishin	427,368 (6.6%)	1	1	Kazumi Sugimoto	Aichi 10th	88.7%
JCP	334,599 (5.1%)	1	1	Nobuko Motomura		
CPJ	255,726 (3.9%)	1	1	Yuko Takegami		

== Kinki block ==
2024 Japanese general election in Kinki
- 27 October 2024

All 73 seats to the House of Representatives
	Majority party	Minority party	Third party
Party	Ishin	LDP	CDP
Last election	26 seats	25 seats	7 seats
Constituency	7	6	5
PR seats	21	14	4
Total	28	20	9
Seat change	▲2	▼5	▲2
	Fourth party	Fifth party	Sixth party
Party	Komeito	DPP	JCP
Last election	9 seats	3 seats	2 seats
Constituency	2	0	0
PR seats	3	2	2
Total	5	2	2
Seat change	▼4	▼1	0
	Seventh party	Eighth party	Ninth party
Party	Reiwa	Sanseito	CPJ
Last election	1 seat	New	New
Constituency	0	0	0
PR seats	2	1	1
Total	2	1	1
Seat change	▲1	▲1	▲1

Single-member constituency results in Kinki
Constituency	Previous member		Elected member		Votes	%	Margin	Runner-up		%	Status
Shiga 1st	Toshitaka Ōoka	LDP	Alex Saito	Ishin	74,126	43.0	4,093	Toshitaka Ōoka	LDP	40.6	Ishin gain from LDP
Shiga 2nd	Kenichiro Ueno	LDP	Kenichiro Ueno	LDP	99,347	43.7	34,023	Michio Hirao	CDP	28.7	LDP hold
Shiga 3rd	Nobuhide Takemura	LDP	Nobuhide Takemura	LDP	95,874	45.1	31,246	Shingo Deji	Ishin	30.4	LDP hold
Shiga 4th	Hiroo Kotera	LDP	Seat abolished								LDP loss
Kyoto 1st	Yasushi Katsume	LDP	Yasushi Katsume	LDP	63,057	31.9	25,181	Sachiko Horiba	Ishin	19.1	LDP hold
Kyoto 2nd	Seiji Maehara	Ishin	Seiji Maehara	Ishin	60,922	45.9	30,225	Akiko Horikawa	JCP	23.1	Ishin hold
Kyoto 3rd	Kenta Izumi	CDP	Kenta Izumi	CDP	82,823	47.2	44,191	Kansei Mori	LDP	22.0	CDP hold
Kyoto 4th	Keiro Kitagami	Ind.	Keiro Kitagami	Ind.	102,063	51.3	42,166	Hideyuki Tanaka	LDP	30.1	Ind. hold
Kyoto 5th	Taro Honda	LDP	Taro Honda	LDP	57,455	46.3	25,100	Wakako Yamamoto	CDP	26.1	LDP hold
Kyoto 6th	Kazunori Yamanoi	CDP	Kazunori Yamanoi	CDP	97,542	40.1	32,390	Hiromichi Sonosaki	LDP	26.8	CDP hold
Osaka 1st	Inoue Hidetaka	Ishin	Inoue Hidetaka	Ishin	102,113	48.2	45,766	Hiroyuki Onishi	LDP	26.6	Ishin hold
Osaka 2nd	Tadashi Morishima	Ishin	Tadashi Morishima	Ishin	99,277	44.2	31,444	ja	LDP	30.2	Ishin hold
Osaka 3rd	Shigeki Sato	Komei	Tōru Azuma	Ishin	74,546	41.3	22,439	Shigeki Sato	Komei	28.9	Ishin gain from Komei
Osaka 4th	Teruo Minobe	Ishin	Teruo Minobe	Ishin	94,129	43.1	29,705	Yasuhide Nakayama	LDP	29.5	Ishin hold
Osaka 5th	Tōru Kunishige	Komei	Satoshi Umemura	Ishin	87,100	39.9	21,228	Tōru Kunishige	Komei	30.2	Ishin gain from Komei
Osaka 6th	Shinichi Isa	Komei	Kaoru Nishida	Ishin	77,905	39.3	8,847	Shinichi Isa	Komei	34.9	Ishin gain from Komei
Osaka 7th	Takemitsu Okushita	Ishin	Takemitsu Okushita	Ishin	95,367	44.5	28,932	Naomi Tokashiki	LDP	31.0	Ishin hold
Osaka 8th	Joji Uruma	Ishin	Joji Uruma	Ishin	84,503	36.6	17,921	Keiichiro Korai	LDP	28.8	Ishin hold
Osaka 9th	Yasushi Adachi	Ishin	Kei Hagihara	Ishin	84,068	42.6	21,898	Junpei Higashida	LDP	31.5	Ishin hold
Osaka 10th	Taku Ikeshita	Ishin	Taku Ikeshita	Ishin	79,621	44.1	20,650	Kanako Otsuji	CDP	32.7	Ishin hold
Osaka 11th	Hiroshi Nakatsuka	Ishin	Hiroshi Nakatsuka	Ishin	115,411	55.6	55,854	Saya Otsuji	LDP	28.7	Ishin hold
Osaka 12th	Fumitake Fujita	Ishin	Fumitake Fujita	Ishin	86,380	52.3	30,722	Shinpei Kitakawa	LDP	33.7	Ishin hold
Osaka 13th	Ryohei Iwatani	Ishin	Ryohei Iwatani	Ishin	79,898	41.9	10,298	Koichi Munekiyo	LDP	36.5	Ishin hold
Osaka 14th	Hitoshi Aoyagi	Ishin	Hitoshi Aoyagi	Ishin	95,362	45.2	23,823	Norifumi Shiokawa	LDP	33.9	Ishin hold
Osaka 15th	Yasuto Urano	Ishin	Yasuto Urano	Ishin	77,584	41.3	15,233	Tomoaki Shimada	LDP	33.2	Ishin hold
Osaka 16th	Kazuo Kitagawa	Komei	Masaki Kuroda	Ishin	63,288	37.3	7,814	Kanae Yamamoto	Komei	32.7	Ishin gain from Komei
Osaka 17th	Nobuyuki Baba	Ishin	Nobuyuki Baba	Ishin	82,234	52.3	36,330	Shohei Okashita	LDP	29.2	Ishin hold
Osaka 18th	Takashi Endo	Ishin	Takashi Endo	Ishin	99,973	51.2	53,607	Takatsugu Uchida	LDP	23.8	Ishin hold
Osaka 19th	Ito Nobuhisa	Ishin	Ito Nobuhisa	Ishin	65,726	45.2	4,847	Tomu Tanigawa	LDP	41.8	Ishin hold
Hyogo 1st	Nobuhiko Isaka	CDP	Nobuhiko Isaka	CDP	91,797	43.9	45,810	Masahito Moriyama	LDP	22.0	CDP hold
Hyogo 2nd	Kazuyoshi Akaba	Komei	Kazuyoshi Akaba	Komei	70,018	37.2	22,729	Keishi Abe	Ishin	25.6	Komei hold
Hyogo 3rd	Yoshihiro Seki	LDP	Yoshihiro Seki	LDP	58,876	36.8	15,074	Koichi Mukoyama	DPFP	27.4	LDP hold
Hyogo 4th	Hisayuki Fujii	LDP	Hisayuki Fujii	LDP	95,635	45.2	33,913	Mao Imaizumi	CDP	29.1	LDP hold
Hyogo 5th	Koichi Tani	LDP	Koichi Tani	LDP	96,659	46.0	36,989	Naoya Tamura	CDP	29.5	LDP hold
Hyogo 6th	Koichiro Ichimura	Ishin	Shu Sakurai	CDP	79,061	33.2	9,340	Masaki Ogushi	LDP	29.3	CDP gain from Ishin
Hyogo 7th	Kenji Yamada	LDP	Kenji Yamada	LDP	80,434	32.6	8,085	Kē Miki	Ishin	29.3	LDP hold
Hyogo 8th	Hiromasa Nakano	Komei	Hiromasa Nakano	Komei	71,784	38.3	11,634	Junko Tokuyasu	Ishin	32.1	Komei hold
Hyogo 9th	Yasutoshi Nishimura	Ind.	Yasutoshi Nishimura	Ind.	88,676	45.6	17,938	Keigo Hashimoto	CDP	36.4	LDP hold
Hyogo 10th	Kisaburo Tokai	LDP	Kisaburo Tokai	LDP	70,673	41.7	29,238	Keiko Oki	CDP	24.4	LDP hold
Hyogo 11th	Takeaki Matsumoto	LDP	Takeaki Matsumoto	LDP	89,943	48.5	30,205	Hiroki Sumiyoshi	Ishin	32.2	LDP hold
Hyogo 12th	Tsuyoshi Yamaguchi	LDP	Tsuyoshi Yamaguchi	LDP	72,374	49.0	15,910	Kotaro Ikehata	Ishin	38.2	LDP hold
Nara 1st	Sumio Mabuchi	CDP	Sumio Mabuchi	CDP	90,323	39.0	17,109	Shigeki Kobayashi	LDP	31.6	CDP hold
Nara 2nd	Sanae Takaichi	LDP	Sanae Takaichi	LDP	128,554	60.2	92,183	Mitsunori Ozaki	CDP	17.0	LDP hold
Nara 3rd	Taido Tanose	LDP	Taido Tanose	LDP	92,379	49.2	50,482	Daisuke Harayama	Ishin	22.3	LDP hold
Wakayama 1st	Yumi Hayashi	Ishin	Daichi Yamamoto	LDP	70,869	36.2	124	Yumi Hayashi	Ishin	36.2	LDP gain from Ishin
Wakayama 2nd	Masatoshi Ishida	LDP	Hiroshige Sekō	Ind.	101,739	44.0	30,625	Nobuyasu Nikai	LDP	30.8	Ind. gain from LDP
Wakayama 3rd	Toshihiro Nikai	LDP	Seat abolished								LDP loss

Proportional representation results
Party	Votes	Seats	Rank	Elected member	Constituency	Ratio
Ishin	2,069,796 (23.3%)	7	1	Yumi Hayashi	Wakayama 1st	99.8%
Ishin	2,069,796 (23.3%)	7	1	Kē Miki	Hyogo 7th	89.9%
Ishin	2,069,796 (23.3%)	7	1	Junko Tokuyasu	Hyogo 8th	83.7%
Ishin	2,069,796 (23.3%)	7	1	Kotaro Ikehata	Hyogo 12th	78.0%
Ishin	2,069,796 (23.3%)	7	1	Koichiro Ichimura	Hyogo 6th	75.4%
Ishin	2,069,796 (23.3%)	7	1	Yuichiro Wada	Hyogo 3rd	69.7%
Ishin	2,069,796 (23.3%)	7	1	Keishi Abe	Hyogo 2nd	68.9%
LDP	1,837,859 (20.7%)	6	1	Hiroo Kotera		
LDP	1,837,859 (20.7%)	6	2	Masatoshi Ishida		
LDP	1,837,859 (20.7%)	6	3	Toshitaka Ōoka	Shiga 1st	94.4%
LDP	1,837,859 (20.7%)	6	3	Masaki Ogushi	Hyogo 6th	88.1%
LDP	1,837,859 (20.7%)	6	3	Shigeki Kobayashi	Nara 1st	81.0%
LDP	1,837,859 (20.7%)	6	3	Tomoaki Shimada	Osaka 15th	80.3%
CDP	1,247,328 (14.1%)	4	1	Hiroyuki Moriyama	Osaka 16th	80.4%
CDP	1,247,328 (14.1%)	4	1	Keigo Hashimoto	Hyogo 9th	79.7%
CDP	1,247,328 (14.1%)	4	1	Satoru Okada	Hyogo 7th	75.8%
CDP	1,247,328 (14.1%)	4	1	Kanako Otsuji	Osaka 10th	74.0%
Komei	1,030,324 (11.6%)	3	1	Yuzuru Takeuchi		
Komei	1,030,324 (11.6%)	3	2	Tomoko Ukishima		
Komei	1,030,324 (11.6%)	3	3	Yoko Wanibuchi		
DPFP	739,441 (8.3%)	2	1	Koichi Mukoyama	Hyogo 3rd	74.3%
DPFP	739,441 (8.3%)	2	1	Masaki Hiraiwa	Osaka 8th	47.9%
JCP	649,195 (7.3%)	2	1	Kotaro Tatsumi		
JCP	649,195 (7.3%)	2	2	Akiko Horikawa	Kyoto 2nd	50.3%
Reiwa	557,899 (6.3%)	2	1	Akiko Ōishi	Osaka 5th	30.7%
Reiwa	557,899 (6.3%)	2	1	Ai Yahata	Osaka 13th	28.1%
Sansei	350,211 (3.9%)	1	1	Yuko Kitano	Shiga 3rd	28.0%
CPJ	288,326 (3.3%)	1	1	Yoichi Shimada		

== Chugoku block ==
2024 Japanese general election in Chugoku
- 27 October 2024

All 27 seats to the House of Representatives
	Majority party	Minority party	Third party
Party	LDP	CDP	Komeito
Last election	23 seats	3 seats	3 seats
Constituency	12	3	1
PR seats	5	3	1
Total	17	6	2
Seat change	▼6	▲3	▼1
	Fourth party	Fifth party
Party	DPP	Ishin
Last election	0 seats	1 seat
Constituency	0	1
PR seats	1	0
Total	1	1
Seat change	▲1	0

Single-member constituency results in Chugoku
Constituency	Previous member		Elected member		Votes	%	Margin	Runner-up		%	Status
Tottori 1st	Shigeru Ishiba	LDP	Shigeru Ishiba	LDP	106,670	85.1	94,281	Hiroyuki Asakura	CDP	9.9	LDP hold
Tottori 2nd	Ryosei Akazawa	LDP	Ryosei Akazawa	LDP	81,526	61.8	37,830	Shinji Yuhara	CDP	33.1	LDP hold
Shimane 1st	Akiko Kamei	CDP	Akiko Kamei	CDP	73,484	51.1	10,246	Emiko Takagai	LDP	44.0	CDP hold
Shimane 2nd	Yasuhiro Takami	LDP	Yasuhiro Takami	LDP	99,829	60.8	50,527	Satoko Otsuka	CDP	30.0	LDP hold
Okayama 1st	Ichiro Aisawa	LDP	Ichiro Aisawa	LDP	67,710	42.0	16,175	Kensuke Harada	CDP	31.9	LDP hold
Okayama 2nd	Takashi Yamashita	LDP	Takashi Yamashita	LDP	95,452	47.7	3,546	Keisuke Tsumura	CDP	45.9	LDP hold
Okayama 3rd	Shojiro Hiranuma	LDP	Katsunobu Katō	LDP	133,389	64.6	73,608	Tomoko Hata	CDP	28.9	LDP hold
Okayama 4th	Gaku Hashimoto	LDP	Michiyoshi Yunoki	CDP	89,149	50.3	13,749	Gaku Hashimoto	LDP	42.6	CDP gain from LDP
Okayama 5th	Katsunobu Katō	LDP	Seat abolished								LDP loss
Hiroshima 1st	Fumio Kishida	LDP	Fumio Kishida	LDP	100,740	52.4	54,247	Koichi Hiramoto	CDP	24.2	LDP hold
Hiroshima 2nd	Hiroshi Hiraguchi	LDP	Hiroshi Hiraguchi	LDP	82,443	45.0	20,764	Gen Fukuda	DPFP	33.6	LDP hold
Hiroshima 3rd	Tetsuo Saito	Komei	Tetsuo Saito	Komei	86,654	47.2	14,702	Katsuya Azuma	CDP	39.2	Komei hold
Hiroshima 4th	Masayoshi Shintani	LDP	Seiki Soramoto	Ishin	93,707	50.6	2,054	Minoru Terada	LDP	49.4	Ishin gain from LDP
Hiroshima 5th	Minoru Terada	LDP	Koji Sato	CDP	82,297	53.4	21,501	Toshifumi Kojima	LDP	39.4	CDP gain from LDP
Hiroshima 6th	Koji Sato	CDP	Fumiaki Kobayashi	LDP	97,991	60.1	45,139	Shinya Inoue	CDP	32.4	LDP gain from CDP
Hiroshima 7th	Fumiaki Kobayashi	LDP	Seat abolished								LDP loss
Yamaguchi 1st	Masahiro Kōmura	LDP	Masahiro Kōmura	LDP	99,644	54.3	59,407	Fumiko Sakamoto	CDP	21.9	LDP hold
Yamaguchi 2nd	Nobuchiyo Kishi	LDP	Nobuchiyo Kishi	LDP	104,885	50.4	1,724	Hideo Hiraoka	CDP	49.6	LDP hold
Yamaguchi 3rd	Yoshimasa Hayashi	LDP	Yoshimasa Hayashi	LDP	115,687	69.7	83,428	Hirofumi Ito	Ishin	19.4	LDP hold
Yamaguchi 4th	Shinji Yoshida	LDP	Seat abolished								LDP loss

Proportional representation results
Party	Votes	Seats	Rank	Elected member	Constituency	Ratio
LDP	1,056,320 (35.9%)	5	1	Masayoshi Shintani		
LDP	1,056,320 (35.9%)	5	2	Shojiro Hiranuma		
LDP	1,056,320 (35.9%)	5	3	Rintaro Ishibashi		
LDP	1,056,320 (35.9%)	5	4	Shinji Yoshida		
LDP	1,056,320 (35.9%)	5	5	Minoru Terada	Hiroshima 4th	97.8%
CDP	572,598 (19.5%)	3	1	Hideo Hiraoka	Yamaguchi 2nd	98.3%
CDP	572,598 (19.5%)	3	1	Keisuke Tsumura	Okayama 2nd	96.2%
CDP	572,598 (19.5%)	3	1	Katsuya Azuma	Hiroshima 3rd	83.0%
Komei	354,291 (12.0%)	1	1	Akira Hirabayashi		
DPFP	307,681 (10.5%)	1	1	Gen Fukuda	Hiroshima 2nd	74.8%

== Shikoku block ==
2024 Japanese general election in Shikoku
- 27 October 2024

All 16 seats to the House of Representatives
	Majority party	Minority party
Party	LDP	CDP
Last election	11 seats	2 seats
Constituency	7	2
PR seats	3	1
Total	10	3
Seat change	▼1	▲1
	Third party	Fourth party
Party	DPP	Komeito
Last election	1 seat	1 seat
Constituency	1	0
PR seats	1	1
Total	2	1
Seat change	▲1	0

Single-member constituency results in Shikoku
Constituency	Previous member		Elected member		Votes	%	Margin	Runner-up		%	Status
Tokushima 1st	Hirobumi Niki	LDP	Hirobumi Niki	LDP	85,386	49.9	30,547	Ei Takahashi	CDP	32.0	LDP hold
Tokushima 2nd	Shunichi Yamaguchi	LDP	Shunichi Yamaguchi	LDP	55,830	43.9	3,679	Kamon Iizumi	Ind.	41.0	LDP hold
Kagawa 1st	Junya Ogawa	CDP	Junya Ogawa	CDP	82,549	51.3	30,822	Takuya Hirai	LDP	32.2	CDP hold
Kagawa 2nd	Yuichiro Tamaki	DPFP	Yuichiro Tamaki	DPFP	89,899	66.4	50,893	Takakazu Seto	LDP	28.8	DPFP hold
Kagawa 3rd	Keitaro Ohno	LDP	Keitaro Ohno	LDP	62,545	55.1	32,645	Hiromi Ooka	CDP	26.3	LDP hold
Ehime 1st	Akihisa Shiozaki	LDP	Akihisa Shiozaki	LDP	105,498	54.0	57,105	Tomoe Ishii	DPFP	24.8	LDP hold
Ehime 2nd	Seiichiro Murakami	LDP	Yoichi Shiraishi	CDP	102,363	51.2	22,307	Takumi Ihara	LDP	40.1	CDP gain from LDP
Ehime 3rd	Takumi Ihara	LDP	Junji Hasegawa	LDP	102,587	62.1	51,885	Kiyosumi Ochi	CDP	30.7	LDP hold
Ehime 4th	Junji Hasegawa	LDP	Seat abolished								LDP loss
Kochi 1st	Gen Nakatani	LDP	Gen Nakatani	LDP	89,110	61.5	33,360	Norio Takeuchi	CDP	38.5	LDP hold
Kochi 2nd	Masanao Ozaki	LDP	Masanao Ozaki	LDP	102,501	70.3	59,107	Yuriko Hamakawa	JCP	29.7	LDP hold

Proportional representation results
Party	Votes	Seats	Rank	Elected member	Constituency	Ratio
LDP	479,835 (31.0%)	3	1	Seiichiro Murakami		
LDP	479,835 (31.0%)	3	2	Takuya Hirai	Kagawa 1st	62.6%
LDP	479,835 (31.0%)	3	2	Takakazu Seto	Kagawa 2nd	43.3%
CDP	281,209 (18.2%)	1	1	Ei Takahashi	Tokushima 1st	64.2%
DPFP	233,515 (15.1%)	1	1	Tomoe Ishii	Ehime 1st	45.8%
Komei	196,765 (12.7%)	1	1	Masayasu Yamasaki		

== Kyushu block ==
2024 Japanese general election in Kyushu
- 27 October 2024

All 54 seats to the House of Representatives
	Majority party	Minority party	Third party
Party	LDP	CDP	Komeito
Last election	30 seats	10 seats	4 seats
Constituency	19	7	0
PR seats	7	4	3
Total	26	11	3
Seat change	▼4	▲1	▼1
	Fourth party	Fifth party	Sixth party
Party	DPP	Ishin	JCP
Last election	2 seats	2 seats	2 seats
Constituency	1	1	1
PR seats	2	1	1
Total	3	2	2
Seat change	▲1	0	0
	Seventh party	Eighth party	Ninth party
Party	Reiwa	Sanseito	SDP
Last election	0 seats	New	1 seat
Constituency	0	0	1
PR seats	1	1	0
Total	1	1	1
Seat change	▲1	▲1	0

Single-member constituency results in Kyushu
Constituency	Previous member		Elected member		Votes	%	Margin	Runner-up		%	Status
Fukuoka 1st	Takahiro Inoue	LDP	Takahiro Inoue	LDP	70,408	35.2	15,065	Keisuke Maruo	CDP	27.7	LDP hold
Fukuoka 2nd	Makoto Oniki	LDP	Shuji Inatomi	CDP	98,837	41.9	12,139	Makoto Oniki	LDP	36.8	CDP gain from LDP
Fukuoka 3rd	Atsushi Koga	LDP	Atsushi Koga	LDP	95,074	41.2	29,239	Genki Nieda	CDP	28.5	LDP hold
Fukuoka 4th	Hideki Miyauchi	LDP	Hideki Miyauchi	LDP	68,585	33.6	27,832	Ryotaro Konomi	DPFP	19.9	LDP hold
Fukuoka 5th	Kaname Tsutsumi	CDP	Wataru Kurihara	LDP	105,563	42.9	21,975	Kaname Tsutsumi	CDP	34.0	LDP gain from CDP
Fukuoka 6th	Jiro Hatoyama	LDP	Jiro Hatoyama	LDP	88,197	48.5	41,200	Masahiko Kondo	DPFP	25.9	LDP hold
Fukuoka 7th	Satoshi Fujimaru	LDP	Satoshi Fujimaru	LDP	79,029	56.9	31,585	Akihisa Kameda	CDP	34.2	LDP hold
Fukuoka 8th	Tarō Asō	LDP	Tarō Asō	LDP	92,534	57.0	57,041	Shoko Kawano	JCP	21.9	LDP hold
Fukuoka 9th	Rintaro Ogata	Ind.	Rintaro Ogata	Ind.	102,885	57.3	52,633	Asato Mihara	Ind.	28.0	Ind. hold
Fukuoka 10th	Takashi Kii	CDP	Takashi Kii	CDP	71,687	38.6	17,501	Haruka Yoshimura	LDP	29.1	CDP hold
Fukuoka 11th	Ryota Takeda	LDP	Tomonobu Murakami	Ishin	58,842	45.0	2,235	Ryota Takeda	LDP	43.3	Ishin gain from LDP
Saga 1st	Kazuhiro Haraguchi	CDP	Kazuhiro Haraguchi	CDP	96,083	54.7	16,360	Kazuchika Iwata	LDP	45.3	CDP hold
Saga 2nd	Hiroshi Ogushi	CDP	Hiroshi Ogushi	CDP	95,581	51.2	19,027	Yasushi Furukawa	LDP	41.0	CDP hold
Nagasaki 1st	Hideko Nishioka	DPFP	Hideko Nishioka	DPFP	87,784	52.5	39,402	Hirofumi Shimojo	LDP	29.0	DPFP hold
Nagasaki 2nd	Ryusho Kato	LDP	Ryusho Kato	LDP	96,095	46.3	14,287	Katsuhiko Yamada	CDP	39.5	LDP hold
Nagasaki 3rd	Katsuhiko Yamada	CDP	Yozo Kaneko	LDP	90,930	50.9	22,436	Seiichi Suetsugu	CDP	38.3	LDP gain from CDP
Nagasaki 4th	Yozo Kaneko	LDP	Seat abolished								LDP loss
Kumamoto 1st	Minoru Kihara	LDP	Minoru Kihara	LDP	110,068	55.1	45,830	Shintaro Deguchi	CDP	32.2	LDP hold
Kumamoto 2nd	Daisuke Nishino	LDP	Daisuke Nishino	LDP	102,624	69.3	76,680	Akane Konda	Ishin	17.5	LDP hold
Kumamoto 3rd	Tetsushi Sakamoto	LDP	Tetsushi Sakamoto	LDP	104,684	63.9	68,596	Rika Hashimura	SDP	22.0	LDP hold
Kumamoto 4th	Yasushi Kaneko	LDP	Yasushi Kaneko	LDP	119,947	58.3	70,275	Yukiko Sasamoto	CDP	24.1	LDP hold
Oita 1st	Shuji Kira	Ind.	Shuji Kira	Ind.	96,944	49.1	26,360	Hiroaki Eto	LDP	35.8	Ind. hold
Oita 2nd	Seishirō Etō	LDP	Ken Hirose	Ind.	62,699	42.5	5,465	Hajime Yoshikawa	CDP	38.8	Ind. gain from LDP
Oita 3rd	Takeshi Iwaya	LDP	Takeshi Iwaya	LDP	87,301	55.2	27,094	Kayako Kobayashi	CDP	38.1	LDP hold
Miyazaki 1st	Sō Watanabe	CDP	Sō Watanabe	CDP	79,605	46.6	30,295	Shunsuke Takei	LDP	28.9	CDP hold
Miyazaki 2nd	Taku Etō	LDP	Taku Etō	LDP	74,367	52.3	12,764	Shinji Nagatomo	DPFP	43.4	LDP hold
Miyazaki 3rd	Yoshihisa Furukawa	LDP	Yoshihisa Furukawa	LDP	94,009	79.2	69,276	Hatsuyo Shinmura	JCP	20.8	LDP hold
Kagoshima 1st	Takuma Miyaji	LDP	Hiroshi Kawauchi	CDP	80,918	46.0	2,697	Takuma Miyaji	LDP	44.5	CDP gain from LDP
Kagoshima 2nd	Satoshi Mitazono	Ind.	Satoshi Mitazono	Ind.	80,397	45.9	25,550	Hirotake Yasuoka	LDP	31.3	Ind. hold
Kagoshima 3rd	Takeshi Noma	CDP	Takeshi Noma	CDP	102,762	58.3	29,132	Yasuhiro Ozato	LDP	41.7	CDP hold
Kagoshima 4th	Hiroshi Moriyama	LDP	Hiroshi Moriyama	LDP	111,484	72.0	68,072	Mitsunori Yamauchi	SDP	28.0	LDP hold
Okinawa 1st	Seiken Akamine	JCP	Seiken Akamine	JCP	49,838	38.1	7,734	Konosuke Kokuba	LDP	32.2	JCP hold
Okinawa 2nd	Kunio Arakaki	SDP	Kunio Arakaki	SDP	61,216	42.0	13,944	Masahisa Miyazaki	LDP	32.5	SDP hold
Okinawa 3rd	Aiko Shimajiri	LDP	Aiko Shimajiri	LDP	87,710	52.1	7,214	Tomohiro Yara	CDP	45.5	LDP hold
Okinawa 4th	Kosaburo Nishime	LDP	Kosaburo Nishime	LDP	61,289	43.4	14,041	Toru Kinjo	CDP	33.4	LDP hold

Proportional representation results
Party	Votes	Seats	Rank	Elected member	Constituency	Ratio
LDP	1,682,815 (28.5%)	7	1	Toshiko Abe		
LDP	1,682,815 (28.5%)	7	2	Takuma Miyaji	Kagoshima 1st	96.6%
LDP	1,682,815 (28.5%)	7	2	Makoto Oniki	Fukuoka 2nd	87.7%
LDP	1,682,815 (28.5%)	7	2	Konosuke Kokuba	Okinawa 1st	84.4%
LDP	1,682,815 (28.5%)	7	2	Kazuchika Iwata	Saga 1st	82.9%
LDP	1,682,815 (28.5%)	7	2	Yasushi Furukawa	Saga 2nd	80.0%
LDP	1,682,815 (28.5%)	7	2	Masahisa Miyazaki	Okinawa 2nd	77.2%
CDP	1,200,921 (20.3%)	4	1	Tomohiro Yara	Okinawa 3rd	97.5%
CDP	1,200,921 (20.3%)	4	1	Hajime Yoshikawa	Oita 2nd	91.2%
CDP	1,200,921 (20.3%)	4	1	Katsuhiko Yamada	Nagasaki 2nd	85.1%
CDP	1,200,921 (20.3%)	4	1	Kaname Tsutsumi	Fukuoka 5th	79.1%
Komei	859,912 (14.6%)	3	1	Masakazu Hamachi		
Komei	859,912 (14.6%)	3	2	Nobuhiro Yoshida		
Komei	859,912 (14.6%)	3	3	Yasukuni Kinjo		
DPFP	564,910 (9.6%)	2	1	Shinji Nagatomo	Miyazaki 2nd	82.8%
DPFP	564,910 (9.6%)	2	1	Ryotaro Konomi	Fukuoka 4th	59.4%
Reiwa	461,425 (7.8%)	1	1	Hitoshi Yamakawa	Okinawa 4th	33.0%
Ishin	382,034 (6.5%)	1	1	Hiroki Abe	Fukuoka 4th	50.4%
Sansei	277,201 (4.7%)	1	1	Rina Yoshikawa		
JCP	275,408 (4.7%)	1	2	Takaaki Tamura		

== Leaders' races ==
Results for party leaders
Party	Member	Constituency	Votes	%	Position	Status
LDP	Shigeru Ishiba	Tottori 1st	106,670	85.1	1st	Re-elected
CDP	Yoshihiko Noda	Chiba 14th	145,821	66.4	1st	Re-elected
Ishin	Nobuyuki Baba	Osaka 17th	82,234	52.3	1st	Re-elected
DPFP	Yuichiro Tamaki	Kagawa 2nd	89,899	66.4	1st	Re-elected
Komei	Keiichi Ishii	Saitama 14th	60,249	31.6	2nd	Defeated
Reiwa	Taro Yamamoto	House of Councillors				
JCP	Tomoko Tamura	Tokyo PR	498,565	7.9	1st	Elected
Sansei	Sohei Kamiya	House of Councillors				
CPJ	Naoki Hyakuta	Did not run				
SDP	Mizuho Fukushima	House of Councillors				

== Closest races ==
Candidates with a narrow loss ratio of over 90%
Constituency	Candidate		Votes	%	Ratio
Wakayama 1st	Yumi Hayashi	Ishin	70,745	36.2	99.8
Gunma 3rd	Kaichi Hasegawa	CDP	74,716	49.9	99.7
Aichi 10th	Shinji Wakayama	LDP	59,529	34.6	99.7
Tochigi 3rd	Shintaro Watanabe	Ind.	45,368	37.2	99.6
Tokyo 10th	Yosuke Suzuki	CDP	92,899	38.4	99.4
Tokyo 28th	Takao Ando	LDP	50,290	28.9	99.3
Kanagawa 6th	Naoki Furukawa	LDP	79,281	39.8	98.8
Akita 1st	Manabu Terata	CDP	59,515	41.1	98.6
Toyama 1st	Toshihiro Yama	CDP	45,179	34.5	98.4
Yamaguchi 2nd	Hideo Hiraoka	CDP	103,161	49.6	98.4
Tokyo 15th	Genki Sudo	Ind.	65,666	27.1	98.3
Chiba 6th	Hiromichi Watanabe	LDP	70,215	33.8	98.1
Tokyo 18th	Reiko Matsushita	CDP	96,820	41.4	97.8
Hiroshima 4th	Minoru Terada	LDP	91,653	49.4	97.8
Chiba 10th	Hajime Yatagawa	CDP	67,920	42.8	97.6
Okinawa 3rd	Tomohiro Yara	CDP	71,457	45.5	97.6
Hokkaido 10th	Hisashi Inatsu	Komei	75,990	49.2	97.0
Tokyo 22nd	Tatsuya Ito	LDP	96,748	39.0	97.0
Tokyo 19th	Yohei Matsumoto	LDP	74,435	38.2	96.8
Shizuoka 4th	Yoichi Fukazawa	LDP	79,801	49.2	96.8
Kagoshima 1st	Takuma Miyaji	LDP	78,221	44.5	96.7
Tokyo 1st	Miki Yamada	LDP	55,040	30.9	96.6
Kanagawa 17th	Naomi Sasaki	CDP	111,061	49.1	96.4
Chiba 13th	Shin Miyakawa	CDP	92,501	42.2	96.3
Okayama 2nd	Keisuke Tsumura	CDP	91,906	45.9	96.3
Saitama 1st	Koichi Takemasa	CDP	82,134	39.9	96.2
Fukuoka 11th	Ryota Takeda	LDP	56,607	43.3	96.2
Saitama 16th	Sota Misumi	CDP	64,244	36.9	96.0
Shizuoka 6th	Takaaki Katsumata	LDP	100,088	44.4	96.0
Aichi 16th	Akiyoshi Inukai	Komei	63,095	31.3	95.7
Chiba 3rd	Kazumasa Okajima	CDP	64,169	39.2	95.3
Saitama 9th	Taku Otsuka	LDP	78,811	39.4	94.8
Shiga 1st	Toshitaka Ōoka	LDP	70,033	40.6	94.5
Mie 2nd	Hideto Kawasaki	LDP	85,863	39.7	94.4
Tokyo 15th	Kōki Ōzora	LDP	62,771	25.9	94.0
Aichi 16th	Isao Matsuda	CDP	61,792	30.7	93.7
Hokkaido 6th	Masahito Nishikawa	CDP	94,193	43.9	93.5
Tokyo 30th	Akihisa Nagashima	LDP	91,798	39.3	93.5
Aomori 1st	Sekio Masuta	CDP	71,211	43.0	93.4
Tokushima 2nd	Kamon Iizumi	Ind.	52,151	41.0	93.4
Hokkaido 4th	Hiroyuki Nakamura	LDP	94,090	41.8	92.7
Yamanashi 1st	Shinichi Nakatani	LDP	99,129	42.5	92.6
Osaka 19th	Tomu Tanigawa	LDP	60,879	41.8	92.6
Akita 2nd	Junji Fukuhara	LDP	65,200	46.4	92.0
Fukushima 4th	Yuki Saito	CDP	78,708	42.7	91.8
Oita 2nd	Hajime Yoshikawa	CDP	57,234	38.8	91.3
Kanagawa 14th	Yoshihiro Nagatomo	CDP	74,238	36.1	91.2
Hokkaido 12th	Eisei Kawaharada	CDP	71,608	47.7	91.1
Saitama 7th	Hideyuki Nakano	LDP	66,498	36.0	90.7
Tokyo 24th	Yoshifu Arita	CDP	71,683	35.0	90.5
Chiba 5th	Arfiya Eri	LDP	59,636	27.6	90.3
Niigata 3rd	Hiroaki Saito	LDP	94,984	44.5	90.2
Akita 3rd	Nobuhide Minorikawa	LDP	74,722	40.5	90.0
