= Hideto Kawasaki =

Japanese politician (born 1981)

- 川崎 秀人
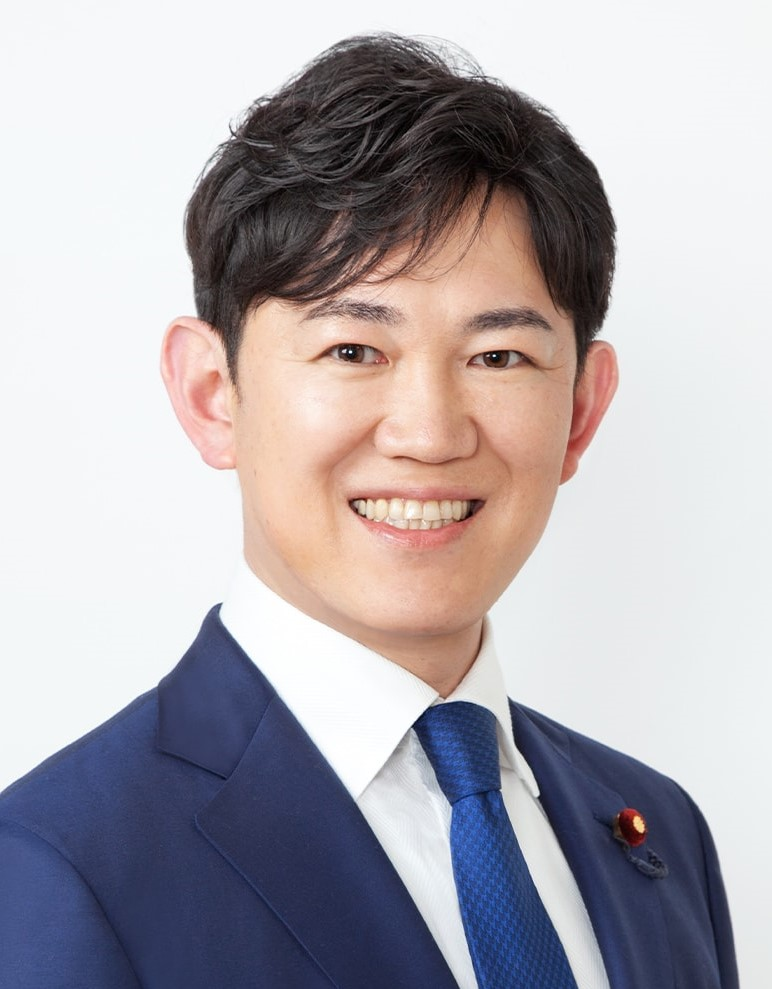
- Official portrait, 2024

Member of the House of Representatives
- Incumbent
- Assumed office 3 November 2021
- Preceded by: Masaharu Nakagawa
- Constituency: Mie 2nd (2021–2024); Tōkai PR (2024–2026); Mie 2nd (2026–present)

Personal details
- Born: 4 November 1981 (age 44) Iga, Mie, Japan
- Party: Liberal Democratic
- Parent: Jirō Kawasaki (father)
- Education: Hosei University

Hideto Kawasaki (川崎秀人, Kawasaki Hideto; born 4 November 1981) is a Japanese politician serving as a member of the House of Representatives since 2021. He is the son of Jirō Kawasaki.
