= Yohei Onishi (politician) =

Japanese politician (born 1978)

- 大西 洋平
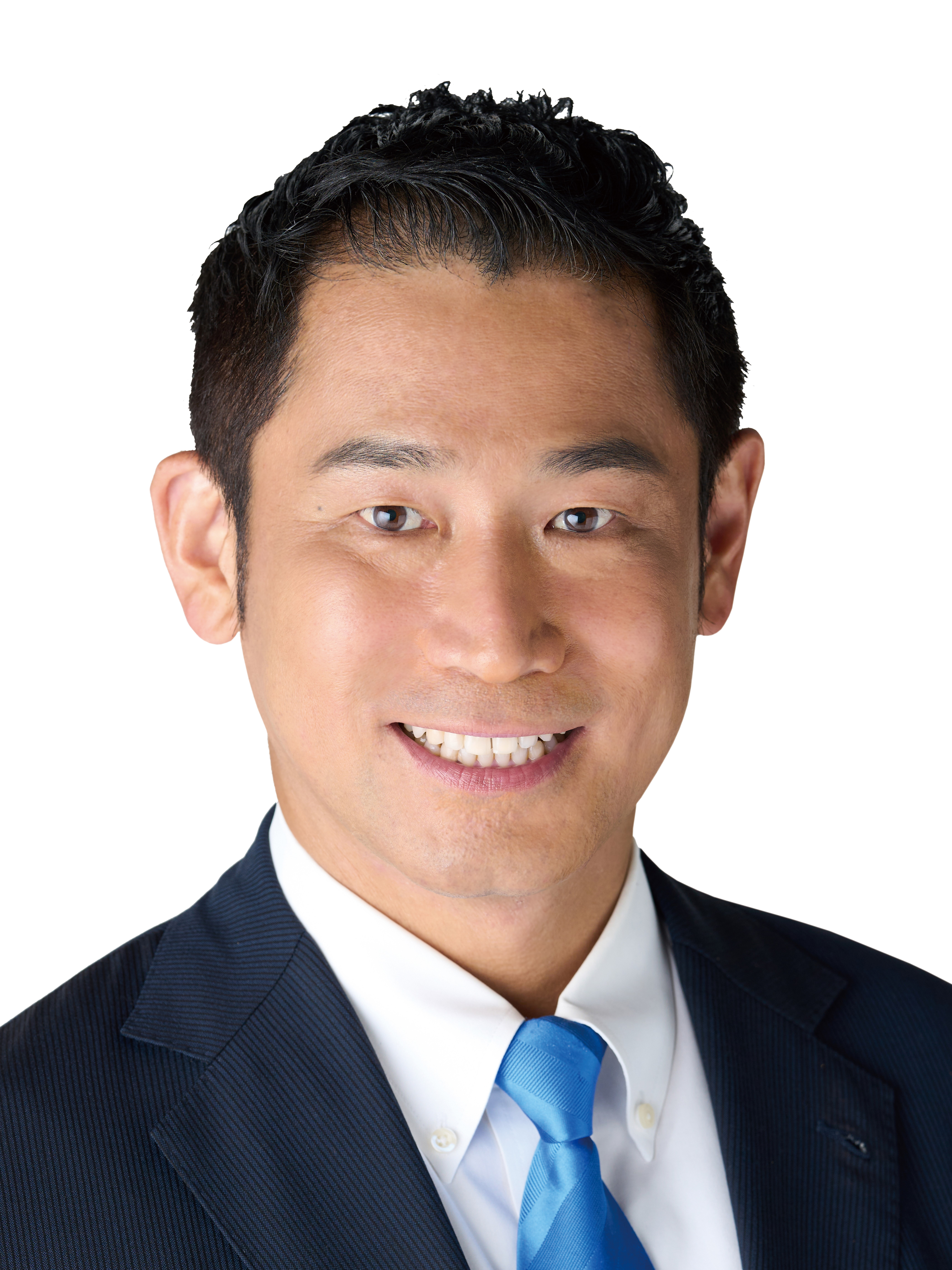
- Official portrait, 2024

Member of the House of Representatives
- Incumbent
- Assumed office 27 October 2024
- Preceded by: Hideo Ōnishi
- Constituency: Tokyo 16th

Member of the Edogawa City Council
- In office 2011–2021

Personal details
- Born: 12 January 1978 (age 48) Edogawa, Tokyo, Japan
- Party: Liberal Democratic
- Parent: Hideo Ōnishi (father)
- Education: Rissho University; Meiji University

Yohei Onishi (大西洋平, Onishi Yohei; born 12 January 1978) is a Japanese politician serving as a member of the House of Representatives since 2024. He is the son of Hideo Ōnishi.
