= Eriko Omori =

Japanese politician

- 大森 江里子
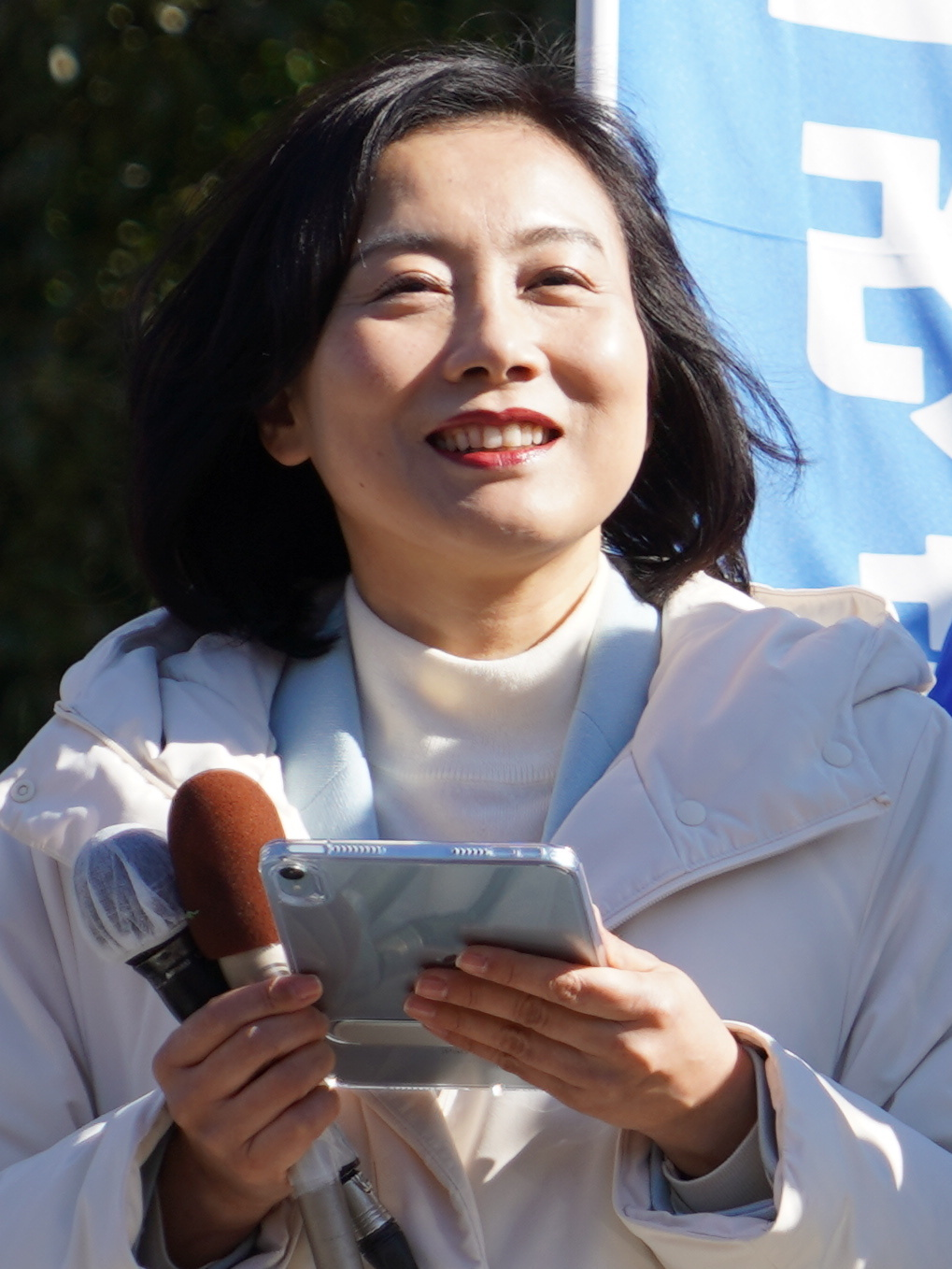
- Omori in 2026

Member of the House of Representatives
- Incumbent
- Assumed office 1 November 2024
- Constituency: Tokyo PR

Personal details
- Born: 16 May 1973 (age 53) Sagamihara, Kanagawa, Japan
- Party: Komeito
- Other political affiliations: CRA (2026)
- Education: Sōka University
- Occupation: Tax accountant

Eriko Omori (Japanese: 大森 江里子, Hepburn: Ōmori Eriko; born 16 May 1973) is a Japanese politician who is a member of the House of Representatives since 2024 for Tokyo proportional representation block.

== Early life ==
Born in Sagamihara, Kanagawa, Omori attended Sōka University's Faculty of Business Administration, and passed the certified public tax accountant (税理士, zeirishi) license examination in 1998, becoming a qualified Tax accountant. In 1999, she joined the Daiko Tax Corporation in Tokyo, where she was involved in a variety of professional activities, including providing relief and advisory support for small and medium-sized enterprises.

== Political career ==
Omori joined Komeito and held various party posts, including Vice Chair of the Women's Committee, deputy director of the International Affairs Bureau, deputy director of the Organizations Bureau, and deputy director of the Women's Affairs Bureau.

In the 2024 general election, Omori ran as Komeito's candidate for Tokyo proportional representation block, ranking second in the party's priority list. As Komeito won two seats in Tokyo PR, Omori was elected, becoming a member of the House of Representatives.

In January 2026, ahead of the 2026 general election, Komeito merged with the Constitutional Democratic Party to form the Centrist Reform Alliance (CRA), which Omori subsequently joined. She stood for re-election in Tokyo PR where she was ranked third on the party's list. The CRA went on to win five seats, securing her re-election. Omori returned to Komeito in September after the CRA's split.

== Political positions ==
In February 2025, she questioned the government at the House of Representatives Budget Committee, stating that “if core employees become business caregivers, it could have a serious impact on business operations,” and called for support for business caregivers who balance work at small and medium-sized enterprises with caring for family members.

In June 2025, she took the floor at the House of Representatives Committee on Judicial Affairs, arguing that “the current law, which effectively forces one spouse to change their surname, poses a human rights issue in terms of freedom of marriage,” and that “the existing system, which restricts choices in how people live, should be revised to create a society with options,” advocating for the introduction of a selective separate surname system for married couples.
