= Tokyo 16th district =

Japan House of Representatives constituency

Tokyo 16th District
- 東京都第16区
- Parliamentary constituency for the Japanese House of Representatives
- Prefecture: Tokyo
- Proportional Block: Tokyo
- Electorate: 391,972 (as of September 2022)

Current constituency
- Created: 1994
- Seats: One
- Party: LDP
- Representative: Yohei Onishi

Tokyo 16th District (東京都第16区, Tokyo-to dai-juroku-ku) is an electoral district of the Japanese House of Representatives. The district was created in 1994 as a part of the move towards single-member districts. In 2024 the district was won by the Liberal Democratic member Yohei Onishi, son of Hideo Ōnishi. who was Representative 2012 – 2024.

== Areas covered ==
=== Current district ===
As of 16 January 2023, the areas covered by this district are as follows:

- Edogawa
  - Chuo 1-3, Matsue 1-7, Osugi 1-5, Nishi-Ichinoe 1-4, Haruecho 4, Ichinoe 1-8, Nishimizue 4, Edogawa 4, Matsumoto 1-2
  - Kasai, Tobu and Shishibone

As part of the 2022 redistricting, the former town of Komatsugawa was transferred to the 14th district.

=== Areas 2017–2022 ===
From the second redistricting in 2017 until the third redistricting in 2022, the areas covered by this district were as follows:

- Edogawa (Koiwa, excluding Kamiishiki 1-3, Honisshiki 1-3, and Okinomiya)
  - Chuo 1-4, Matsushima 1-4, Matsue 1-7, Higashikomatsugawa 1-4, Nishikomatsugawa, Osugi 1-5, Nishi Ichinoe 1-4, Haruecho 4, Ichinoe 1-8, Nishimizue 4, Edogawa 4, Matsumoto 1-2
  - Within the Komatsugawa, Kasai, Tobu and Shishibone areas

As part of the 2017 redistricting, the former towns of Kamiishiki, Motoishiki and Okinomiya were all moved to the 17th district.

=== Areas 2013–2017 ===
From the first redistricting in 2013 until the second redistricting in 2017, the areas covered by this district were as follows:

- Edogawa
  - Central Office (excluding Kami-Ishiki 3)
    - Chuo 1-4, Matsushima 1-4, Matsue 1-7, Higashikomatsugawa 1-4, Nishikomatsugawa, Osugi 1-5, Nishi Ichinoe 1-4, Haruecho 4, Ichinoe (1, 8), Nishimizue 4, Edogawa 4, Matsumoto 1-2, Kamiisshiki 1-2, Honisshiki 1-3, Okinomiyacho
  - Komatsugawa, Kasai, Tobu and Shishibone areas

As part of the 2013 redistricting, the area of Kamiishiki 3 was transferred to the 17th district.

=== Areas from before 2013 ===
From the creation of the district in 1994 until the first redistricting in 2013, the areas covered by this district were as follows:

- Edogawa
  - Central Office
  - Komatsugawa, Kasai, Tobu and Shishibone areas

== Elected representatives ==
Representative	Party	Years served	Notes
Yoshinobu Shimamura	LDP	1996 – 2000	Failed to get re-elected in the 2000 general election, won back the seat in the 2003 general election.
Yoshio Udagawa	Independent	2000 – 2003	Failed to get re-elected in the 2003 general election.
Yoshinobu Shimamura	LDP	2003 – 2009	Not re-elected in the 2009 general election
Akihiro Hatsushika	DPJ	2009 – 2012	Not re-elected in the 2012 general election. Elected to the Tokyo PR district in the 2014 and 2017 general elections.
Hideo Ōnishi	LDP	2012 – 2024	
Yohei Onishi	LDP	2024 –	

== Election results ==
‡ - Also ran in the Tokyo PR district

‡‡ - Also ran and won in the Tokyo PR district

2026
Party	Candidate	Votes	%	±%
LDP	Yohei Onishi	92,858	44.6	▲7.3
Centrist Reform	Katsuyuki Shibata	51,527	24.8	▼6.8
DPP	Tomoko Takeuchi	42,380	20.4	
Sanseitō	Takeshi Murakami	21,320	10.3	▲1.6
Registered electors		391,523		
Turnout			54.48	▲3.10
LDP hold				

2024
Party	Candidate	Votes	%	±%
LDP	Yohei Onishi^{‡}	71,728	37.3	▼1.4
CDP	Katsuyuki Shibata^{‡‡}	60,714	31.6	▲1.8
Ishin	Hirosato Nakatsugawa^{‡}	28,538	14.9	▼2.2
Sanseitō	Masatoshi Arita	16,636	8.7	
JCP	Sakae Miyamoto	14,464	7.5	▼4.2
Registered electors		390,804		
Turnout			51.38	▼0.20
LDP hold				

2021
Party	Candidate	Votes	%	±%
LDP	Hideo Ōnishi (incumbent) (endorsed by Komeito)	88,758	38.7	▲2.2
CDP	Motoko Mizuno^{‡}	68,397	29.8	▼4.8
Ishin	Hirosato Nakatsugawa^{‡}	39,290	17.1	New
JCP	Ota Ayaka	26,819	11.7	New
Anti-NHK	Ken Tanaka^{‡}	6,264	2.7	New
Registered electors		465,115		
Majority		20,361	8.9	▲2.6
Turnout		239,906	51.6	▲4.1
LDP hold		Swing	▲3.8	

2017
Party	Candidate	Votes	%	±%
LDP	Hideo Onishi^{‡} (incumbent) (endorsed by Komeito)	84,457	40.9	▼5.3
CDP	Akihiro Hatsushika^{‡‡}	71,405	34.6	New
Kibō no Tō	Kenji Tamura^{‡}	50,568	24.5	New
Registered electors		462,216		
Majority		13,052	6.3	▼13.4
Turnout		219,506	47.5	▼1.6
LDP hold		Swing	▼6.8	

2014
Party	Candidate	Votes	%	±%
LDP	Hideo Onishi^{‡} (incumbent) (endorsed by Komeito)	98,536	46.3	▲8.3
Ishin	Akihiro Hatsushika^{‡‡} (endorsed by the DPJ)	56,701	26.6	New
JCP	Asako Ota^{‡}	36,976	17.4	▲11.3
Japanese Kokoro	Yoshiaki Ishii^{‡}	11,484	5.4	New
Independent	Takashi Okamoto	9,334	4.4	New
Registered electors		455,218		
Majority		41,835	19.7	▲0.3
Turnout		223,330	49.1	▼8.4
LDP hold		Swing	▲6.1	

2012
Party	Candidate	Votes	%	±%
LDP	Hideo Onishi^{‡} (incumbent)	95,222	38.0	▼3.9
Restoration	Hirosato Nakatsugawa^{‡} (incumbent - Tokyo PR)	46,537	18.6	New
Your	Reiko Ueda^{‡}	43,719	17.3	New
Tomorrow	Akihiro Hatsushika^{‡} (incumbent) (endorsed by the NDP)	27,525	11.0	New
Democratic	Katsuyoshi Konno^{‡} (endorsed by the PNP)	22,741	9.1	▼38.3
JCP	Kayoko Shimacho	15,145	6.1	▲2.5
Registered electors		452,248		
Majority		48,685	19.4	New
Turnout		260,133	57.5	▼4.4
LDP gain from Democratic		Swing	▼9.5	

2009
Party	Candidate	Votes	%	±%
Democratic	Akihiro Hatsushika^{‡}	128,400	47.4	▲14.3
LDP	Yoshinobu Shimamura (incumbent)	113,634	41.9	▼15.1
JCP	Kyoichi Kawai	23,385	8.6	▼1.3
Happiness Realization	Ichiro Kojima	5,763	2.1	New
Registered electors		450,445		
Majority		14,766	5.5	New
Turnout		279,006	61.9	▲1.5
Democratic gain from LDP		Swing	▲8.2	

2005
Party	Candidate	Votes	%	±%
LDP	Yoshinobu Shimamura^{‡}	145,439	57.0	▲21.7
Democratic	Hirosato Nakatsugawa^{‡} (incumbent - Tokyo PR)	84,564	33.1	▲2.1
JCP	Yasunori Abe	25,328	9.9	2.0
Registered electors		439,858		
Majority		60,875	23.9	▲19.4
Turnout		265,498	60.4	▲6.1
LDP hold		Swing	▲13.3	

2003
Party	Candidate	Votes	%	±%
LDP	Yoshinobu Shimamura^{‡}	80,015	35.3	▲4.9
Democratic	Hirosato Nakatsugawa^{‡‡} (incumbent - Tokyo PR)	70,189	31.0	▲6.3
Independent Society	Yoshi Udagawa	58,250	25.7	New
JCP	Yasunori Abe^{‡}	17,985	7.9	▼5.7
Registered electors		432,954		
Majority		9,826	4.3	New
Turnout		234,964	54.3	▼2.1
LDP gain from Independent		Swing	▲6.7	

2000
Party	Candidate	Votes	%	±%
Independent	Yoshio Udagawa	72,825	32.1	New
LDP	Yoshinobu Shimamura^{‡} (incumbent)	69,543	30.6	▼8.4
Democratic	Hirosato Nakatsugawa^{‡‡}	53,897	23.7	New
JCP	Yasunori Abe	30,772	13.6	▼0.4
Registered electors		417,198		
Majority		3,282	1.5	New
Turnout		235,133	56.4	▲4.8
Independent gain from LDP		Swing	N/A	

1996
Party	Candidate	Votes	%	±%
LDP	Yoshinobu Shimamura^{‡} (incumbent - former Tokyo 10th District)	77,753	39.0	New
New Frontier	Naoko Sato	64,942	32.6	New
Democratic	Kazuo Inoue^{‡}	28,805	14.4	New
JCP	Yasunori Abe	27,923	14.0	New
Registered electors		396,286		
Majority		12,811	6.4	New
Turnout		204,444	51.6	New
LDP win (new seat)				
