= Yosuke Mori =

Japanese politician (born 1994)

Yōsuke Mori
- 森 洋介
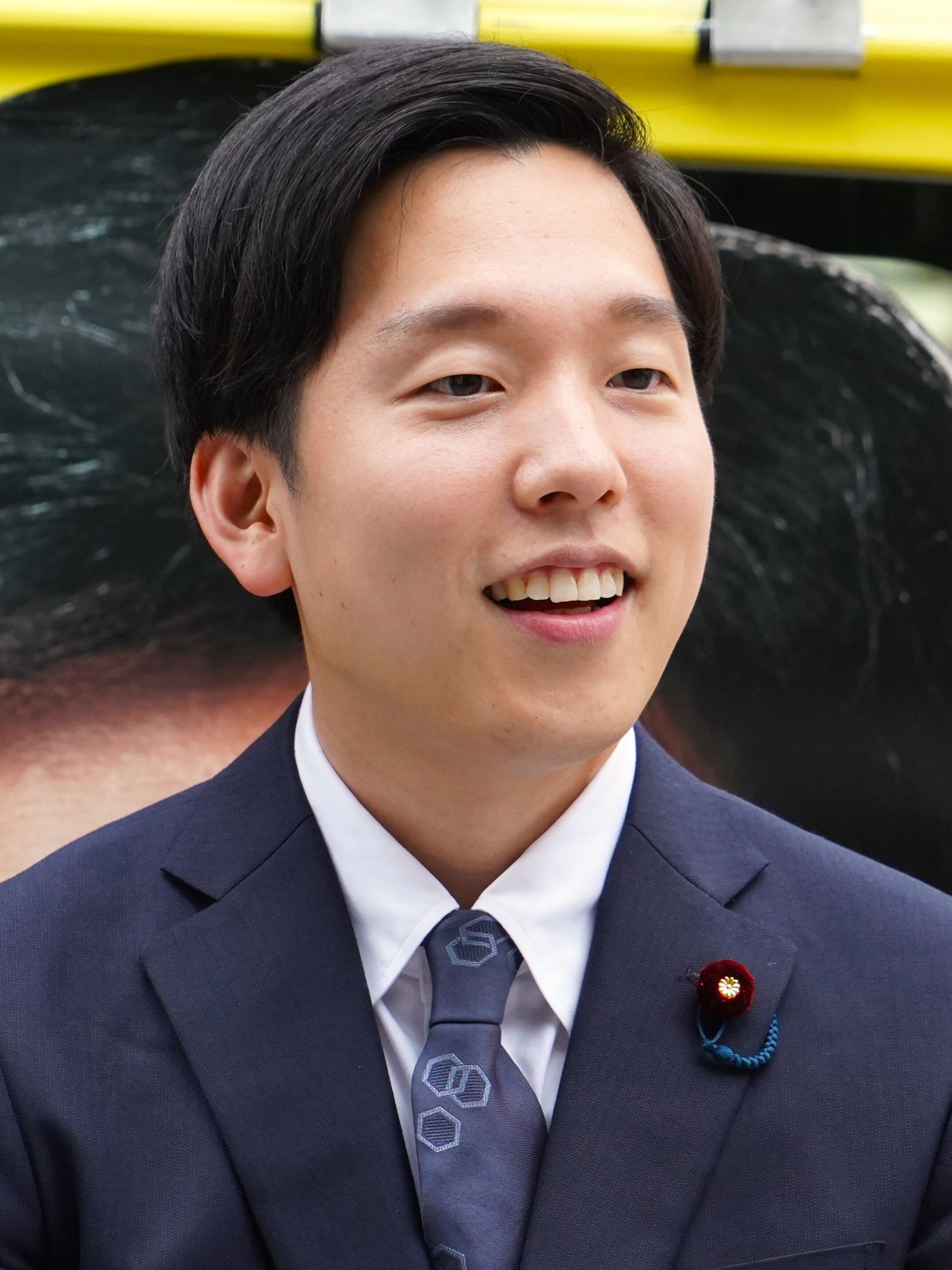
- Mori in 2025

Member of the House of Representatives
- Incumbent
- Assumed office 1 November 2024
- Constituency: Tokyo PR

Personal details
- Born: 15 July 1994 (age 32) Ibaraki, Osaka, Japan
- Party: DPP
- Education: Sophia University; Hitotsubashi University

Yosuke Mori (森洋介, Mori Yōsuke; born 15 July 1994) is a Japanese politician serving as a member of the House of Representatives since 2024. He previously worked at the Ministry of the Environment and at Roland Berger.
