= Kiyoto Tsuji =

Japanese politician (born 1979)

- 辻 清人
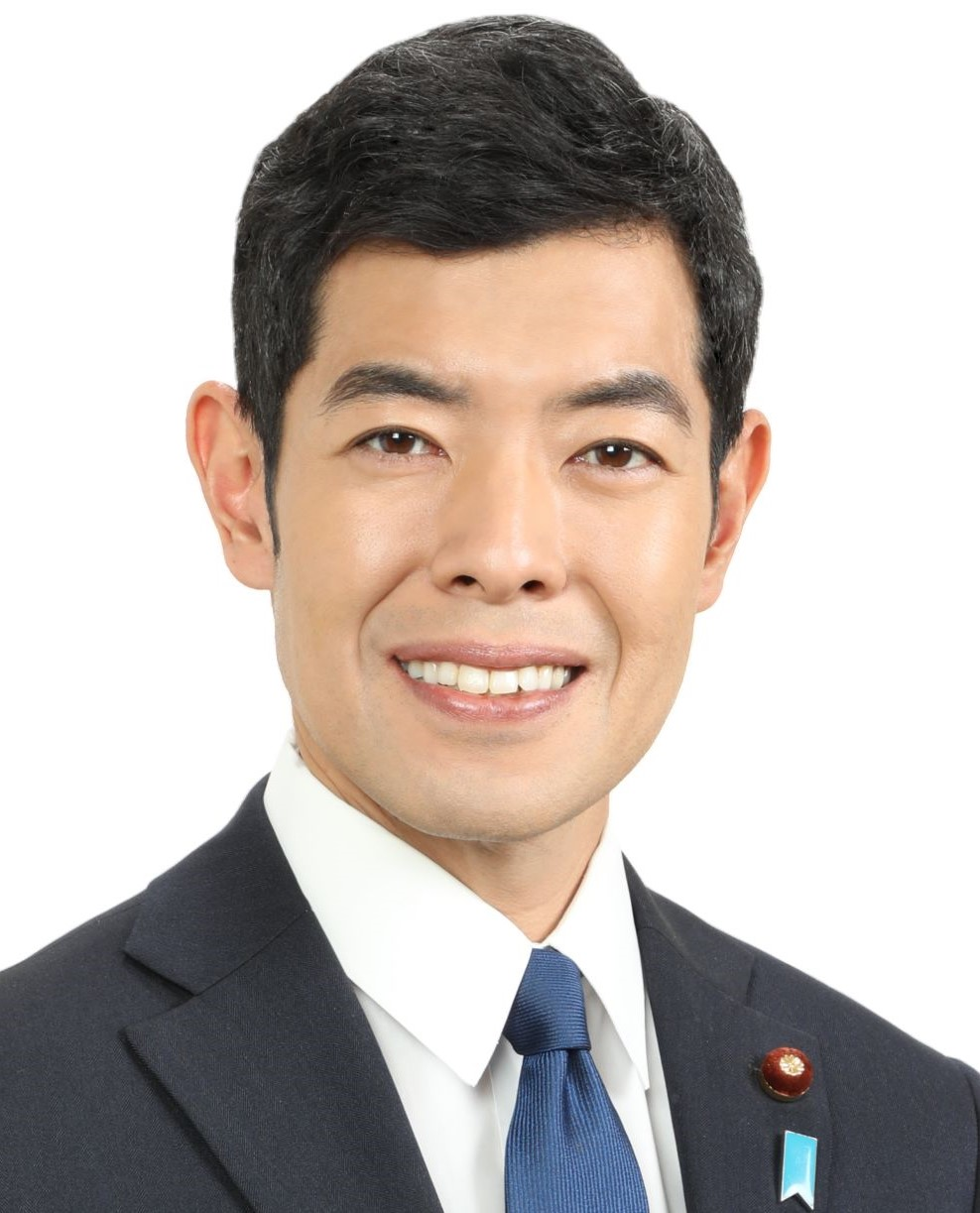
- Official portrait, 2024

Member of the House of Representatives
- Incumbent
- Assumed office 19 December 2012
- Preceded by: Yoshikatsu Nakayama
- Constituency: Tokyo 2nd

Personal details
- Born: 7 September 1979 (age 47) Taitō, Tokyo, Japan
- Party: Liberal Democratic
- Education: Kyoto University; Columbia University

Kiyoto Tsuji (辻清人, Tsuji Kiyoto), born September 7, 1979, is a Japanese politician and member of the House of Representatives, representing the Tokyo 2nd district. He is a member of the Liberal Democratic Party.

== Early life ==
Tsuji was born in Tokyo to a Japanese mother and Japanese-Canadian father. He lived in Vancouver from the ages of four to seventeen. He graduated from Kyoto University and worked for Recruit. After attending graduate school at Columbia University, he worked as a researcher at the Center for Strategic and International Studies, where he worked alongside future LDP lawmaker Shinjirō Koizumi.

== Political career ==
He was elected to the Diet in the 2012 election, defeating DPJ candidate Yoshikatsu Nakayama.

Tsuji ran to replace veteran LDP lawmaker Takashi Fukaya, and personally lobbied Fukaya for support. Fukaya publicly endorsed Tsuji and featured prominently in his 2012 and 2014 campaigns.

Tsuji was re-elected in the 2017 general election, defeating CDP candidate Akihiro Matsuo.
