= Masaharu Nakagawa (House of Representatives) =

Japanese politician

Yoshiaki Takaki
- 中川 正春
- Official portrait, 2011

Minister of State for Disaster Management
- In office 1 February 2012 – 1 October 2012
- Prime Minister: Yoshihiko Noda
- Preceded by: Tatsuo Hirano
- Succeeded by: Mikio Shimoji

Minister of State for the New Public Commons
- In office 1 February 2012 – 1 October 2012
- Prime Minister: Yoshihiko Noda
- Preceded by: Katsuya Okada
- Succeeded by: Ikko Nakatsuka

Minister of State for Gender Equality
- In office 1 February 2012 – 1 October 2012
- Prime Minister: Yoshihiko Noda
- Preceded by: Katsuya Okada
- Succeeded by: Ikko Nakatsuka

Minister of State for Measures for Declining Birthrate
- In office 10 February 2012 – 23 April 2012
- Prime Minister: Yoshihiko Noda
- Preceded by: Katsuya Okada
- Succeeded by: Yoko Komiyama

Minister of Education, Culture, Sports, Science and Technology
- In office 2 September 2011 – 13 January 2012
- Prime Minister: Yoshihiko Noda
- Preceded by: Yoshiaki Takaki
- Succeeded by: Hirofumi Hirano

Member of the House of Representatives
- In office 21 October 1996 – 9 October 2024
- Preceded by: Constituency established
- Succeeded by: Multi-member district
- Constituency: Mie 2nd (1996–2021); Tōkai PR (2021–2024)

Member of the Mie Prefectural Assembly
- In office 1983–1995
- Constituency: Matsusaka City

Personal details
- Born: 10 June 1950 (age 76) Matsusaka, Mie, Japan
- Party: CDP (since 2017)
- Other political affiliations: LDP (before 1992); JNP (1992–1994); NFP (1994–1997); Independent (1997–1998); GGP (1998); DPJ (1998–2016); DP (2016–2017)
- Education: Georgetown University

Masaharu Nakagawa (中川 正春, Nakagawa Masaharu; born 10 June 1950) is a Japanese politician who served in the House of Representatives in the Diet (national legislature) as a member of the Constitutional Democratic Party. A native of Matsusaka, Mie and graduate of Georgetown University in the United States he was elected for the first time in 1996 after serving in the local assembly of Mie Prefecture. In September 2011 he was appointed as Minister of Education, Culture, Sports, Science and Technology in the cabinet of newly appointed prime minister Yoshihiko Noda.
