= Yoshifu Arita =

Japanese writer, journalist and politician

- 有田 芳生
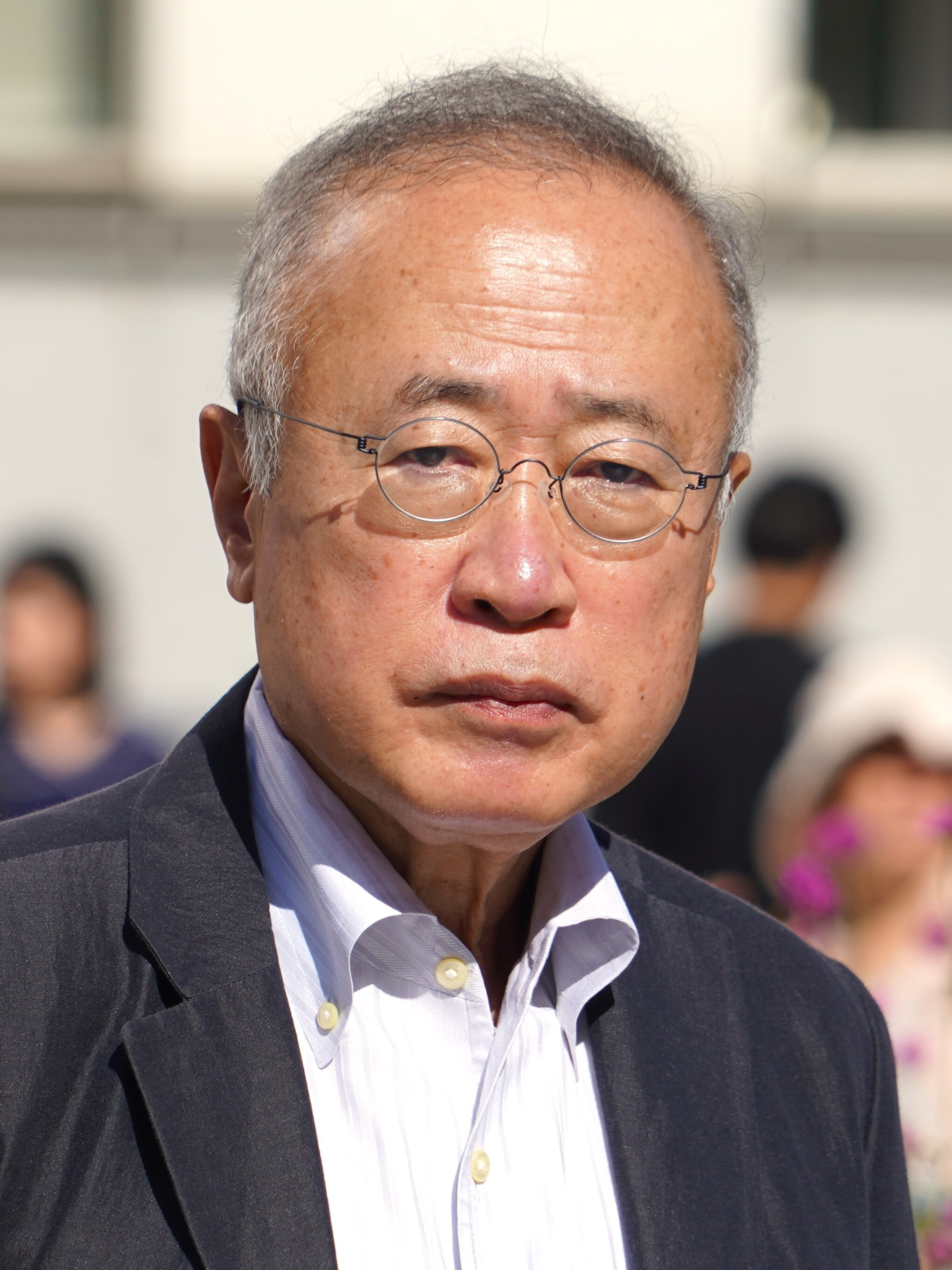
- Arita in 2024

Member of the House of Representatives
- Incumbent
- Assumed office 1 November 2024
- Constituency: Tokyo PR (2024–2026); Tohoku PR (2026–present)

Member of the House of Councillors
- In office 26 July 2010 – 25 July 2022
- Constituency: National PR

Personal details
- Born: 有田芳生 (Arita Yoshifu); 20 February 1952 (age 74) Kitakuwada, Kyoto, Japan
- Party: DRP (2026–present)
- Other political affiliations: JCP (1990–2007); NPN (2007–2009); DPJ (2009–2016); DP (2016–2017); CDP (2017–2026); CRA (2026)
- Education: Ritsumeikan University
- Occupation: Politician, journalist and writer
- Website: Official website

Yoshifu Arita (有田芳生, Arita Yoshifu; born 20 February 1952) is a Japanese writer, journalist and politician from the Constitutional Democratic Party, who is currently serving as a member of the House of Representatives. He previously served two terms as a member of the House of Councillors after being elected in 2010 and in 2016 and serving as Chair of the Special Committee on Political Ethics and Election System, but lost his seat in 2022. Before he was elected, he was a regular commentator of Nippon Television's The Wide.

He is one of the most prominent anti-racism activists in Japan. He is also known for his investigations into religious groups such as Unification Church and Aum Shinri-kyo.
