= Yuki Saito =

Yuki Saito may refer to:

- Yuki Saito (actress) (斉藤 由貴, born 1966), Japanese singer-songwriter, actress, essayist and poet
- Yuki Saito (pitcher, born 1987) (齊藤 悠葵), Japanese baseball pitcher for the Hiroshima Toyo Carp
- Yuki Saito (pitcher, born 1988) (斎藤 佑樹), Japanese baseball pitcher for the Hokkaido Nippon-Ham Fighters
