= Hideo Ōnishi =

Japanese politician

- 大西 英男
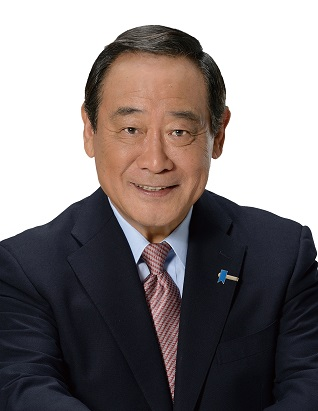
- Official portrait, 2017

Member of the House of Representatives
- In office 19 December 2012 – 9 October 2024
- Preceded by: Akihiro Hatsushika
- Succeeded by: Yohei Onishi
- Constituency: Tokyo 16th

Member of the Tokyo Metropolitan Assembly
- In office 1993–1997
- Constituency: Edogawa Ward

Member of the Edogawa City Council
- In office 1975–1991

Personal details
- Born: 28 August 1946 (age 80) Edogawa, Tokyo, Japan
- Party: Liberal Democratic
- Children: Yohei Onishi
- Education: Kokugakuin University

Hideo Ōnishi (大西英男, Ōnishi Hideo; born August 28, 1946) is a former Japanese politician and member of the House of Representatives, who represented Tokyo 16th district from 2012 to 2024. He is a member of the Liberal Democratic Party.

== Early life ==
Onishi was born in Edogawa, Tokyo. He graduated from Kokugakuin University and worked as an assistant to Diet members Takashi Fukaya and Ichiro Shimamura before entering politics in 1975 as a member of the Edogawa city assembly.

== Political career ==
He served as chairman of the assembly from 1984 to 1993, and then in the Tokyo metropolitan assembly from 1993 to 2007. He was a proportional representation candidate in the 2007 Japanese House of Councillors election but failed to win a seat. He remained active within the LDP's administrative ranks and was elected to the House of Representatives in the 2012 general election.

In 2015, LDP leadership criticized Onishi suggesting businesses stop advertising in press outlets critical of the government, and in 2017 he made controversial comments about cancer patients during a discussion of secondhand smoking regulations.
