= Fukuoka 2nd district =

- Parliamentary constituency for the Japanese House of Representatives
- Numbered map of the Fukuoka Prefecture single seats
- Prefecture: Fukuoka
- Proportional District: Kyushu
- Electorate: 459,330

Current constituency
- Created: 1994
- Seats: One
- Party: LDP
- Representatives: Makoto Oniki
- Municipalities: Chūō-ku, part of Jonan-ku and part of Minami-ku of Fukuoka city.

Fukuoka 2nd district (Japanese: 福岡県第2区/Fukuoka-ken dai-niku, or simply 福岡2区, Fukuoka-niku) is a single-member constituency of the House of Representatives in the national Diet of Japan located in Fukuoka Prefecture.

== Areas covered ==
=== Since 2017 ===
- Part of Fukuoka city
  - Chūō-ku
  - Part of Jonan-ku
  - Part of Minami-ku

=== 1994 - 2017 ===
- Part of Fukuoka city
  - Chūō-ku
  - Jonan-ku
  - Minami-ku

== List of representatives ==
Election	Representative	Party	Notes
1996	Taku Yamasaki	LDP	
2000	Taku Yamasaki	LDP	
2003	Junichiro Koga	Democratic	
2005 by-el	Taku Yamasaki	LDP	
2005	Taku Yamasaki	LDP	
2009	Shuji Inatomi	Democratic	
2012	Makoto Oniki	LDP	
2014	Makoto Oniki	LDP	
2017	Makoto Oniki	LDP	
2021	Makoto Oniki	LDP	
2024	Shuji Inatomi	CDP	
2026	Makoto Oniki	LDP	

== Election results ==
=== 2026 ===
2026
Party	Candidate	Votes	%	±%
LDP	Makoto Oniki	136,442	53.6	▲16.84
Centrist Reform	Shuji Inatomi	76,285	30	▼11.96
Sanseitō	Toshiyuki Kinoshita (elected in Kyushu PR block)	33,027	13	▲5.92
JCP	Motohiro Kandō	8,672	3.4	▼0.93
Majority		60,157	23.6	▲18.45
Registered electors		459,890		
Turnout		254,426	56.23	▼3.76
LDP gain from Centrist Reform				

=== 2024 ===
2024
Party	Candidate	Votes	%	±%
CDP	Shuji Inatomi	98,837	41.94	▼0.62
LDP	Makoto Oniki (Incumbent) (Won PR seat)	86,698	36.79	▼9.18
Sanseitō	Yūko Kuroishi	16,689	7.08	New
Ishin	Yukihiro Honji	16,139	6.85	▼4.62
JCP	Ritsuko Matsuo	10,201	4.33	N/A
Independent	Rie Okizono	7,097	3.01	New
Majority		12,139	5.15	
Registered electors		458,134		
Turnout			52.47	▼1.34
CDP gain from LDP				

=== 2021 ===
2021
Party	Candidate	Votes	%	±%
LDP	Makoto Oniki (Incumbent)	109,382	45.97	▼1.96
CDP	Shuji Inatomi (Won PR seat)	101,258	42.56	New
Ishin	Takashi Shinkai	27,302	11.47	New
Majority		8,124	3.41	
Registered electors		449,552		
Turnout			53.81	▲0.28
LDP hold				

=== 2017 ===
2017
Party	Candidate	Votes	%	±%
LDP	Makoto Oniki (Incumbent)	109,098	47.93	▼1.54
Kibō no Tō	Shuji Inatomi (Won PR seat)	100,938	44.34	New
JCP	Ritsuko Matsuo	17,594	7.73	▼0.59
Majority		8,160	3.59	
Registered electors		434,178		
Turnout			53.53	▲6.49
LDP hold				

=== 2014 ===
2014
Party	Candidate	Votes	%	±%
LDP	Makoto Oniki (Incumbent)	102,241	49.47	▲5.90
Democratic	Shuji Inatomi	83,535	40.42	▲12.19
JCP	Tatsuo Kuramoto	17,200	8.32	▲2.49
Independent	Nobuhisa Nakamura	3,682	1.79	New
Majority		18,706	9.05	
Registered electors		451,222		
Turnout			47.04	▼8.91
LDP hold				

=== 2012 ===
2012
Party	Candidate	Votes	%	±%
LDP	Makoto Oniki	105,493	43.57	▲6.63
Democratic	Shuji Inatomi (Incumbent)	68,359	28.23	▼27.73
Restoration	Shintaro Tōyama	42,731	17.65	New
JCP	Tatsuo Kuramoto	14,115	5.83	▼0.19
Tomorrow	Manabu Kotani	11,442	4.72	New
Majority		37,134	15.34	
Registered electors				
Turnout			55.95	
LDP gain from Democratic				

=== 2009 ===
2009
Party	Candidate	Votes	%	±%
Democratic	Shuji Inatomi	156,431	55.96	▲18.82
LDP	Taku Yamasaki (Incumbent)	103,270	36.94	▼15.41
JCP	Tokiko Kobayashi	16,818	6.02	▲1.10
Happiness Realization	Hideo Satake	3,043	1.08	New
Majority		53,161	19.02	
Registered electors				
Turnout				
Democratic gain from LDP				

=== 2005 ===
2005
Party	Candidate	Votes	%	±%
LDP	Taku Yamasaki (Incumbent)	136,702	52.35	▲8.33
Democratic	Masanori Hirata	96,963	37.14	▼11.56
JCP	Hirotoshi Yamada	12,852	4.92	▼2.36
Social Democratic	Kenshiro Nishimura	11,771	4.51	New
Independent	Yutaka Fujimoto	2,821	1.08	N/A
Majority		39,739	15.21	
Registered electors				
Turnout				
LDP hold				

=== 2005 by-election ===
2005 Fukuoka 2nd district by-election
Party	Candidate	Votes	%	±%
LDP	Taku Yamasaki	96,174	50.22	▲6.20
Democratic	Masanori Hirata	78,311	40.89	▼7.81
JCP	Hirotoshi Yamada	9,868	5.15	▼2.13
Independent	Kenshiro Nishimura	3,292	1.72	New
Independent	Shinichi Hamatake	2,857	1.49	New
Independent	Yutaka Fujimoto	1,004	0.53	New
Majority		17,863	9.33	
Registered electors				
Turnout				
LDP gain from Democratic				

=== 2003 ===
2003
Party	Candidate	Votes	%	±%
Democratic	Junichiro Koga	104,620	48.70	▲10.41
LDP	Taku Yamasaki (Incumbent)	94,565	44.02	▼0.86
JCP	Shuji Gyotoku	15,626	7.28	▼4.64
Majority		10,055	4.68	
Registered electors				
Turnout				
Democratic gain from LDP				

=== 2000 ===
2000
Party	Candidate	Votes	%	±%
LDP	Taku Yamasaki (Incumbent)	93,234	44.88	▼4.36
Democratic	Tsukasa Iwamoto	79,544	38.29	New
JCP	Toshiko Shimizu	24,762	11.92	▲2.31
Liberal League	Miyoko Shirono	10,178	4.91	▲3.57
Majority		13,690	6.59	
Registered electors				
Turnout				
LDP hold				

=== 1996 ===
1996
Party	Candidate	Votes	%	±%
LDP	Taku Yamasaki	98,095	49.24	New
New Frontier	Hirotaro Yamasaki	73,066	36.68	New
JCP	Masaaki Nagao	19,151	9.61	New
Independent	Sumitaka Chuganji	6,242	3.13	New
Liberal League	Midori Okaji	2,663	1.34	New
Majority		25,029	12.56	
Registered electors				
Turnout				
LDP win (new seat)				
