= Makoto Oniki (House of Representatives) =

Japanese politician (born 1972)

- 鬼木 誠
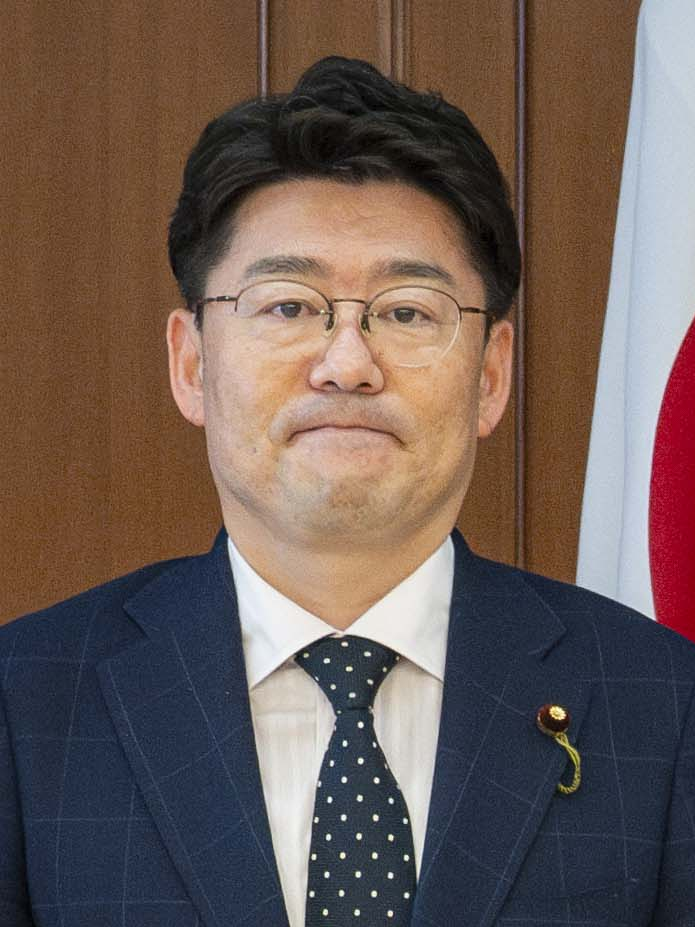
- Oniki in 2024

Member of the House of Representatives
- Incumbent
- Assumed office 19 December 2012
- Preceded by: Shūji Inatomi
- Constituency: Fukuoka 2nd (2012–2024); Kyushu PR (2024–2026); Fukuoka 2nd (2026–present)

Member of the Fukuoka Prefectural Assembly
- In office 2003–2012
- Constituency: Fukuoka City Chūō Ward

Personal details
- Born: 16 October 1972 (age 53) Fukuoka, Fukuoka Prefecture, Japan
- Party: Liberal Democratic
- Education: Kyushu University

Makoto Oniki (鬼木 誠, Oniki Makoto, born 16 October 1972) is a Japanese politician from the Liberal Democratic Party.

== Early life ==
Oniki attended La Salle High School, a prestigious school in Kagoshima where Toshitaka Ōoka was a classmate. After graduating from high school, he went on to Kyushu University and graduated from the Faculty of Law.

== Career ==
After working as a banker, he ran for a seat in the Fukuoka Prefectural Assembly. After being elected, he joined the Liberal Democratic Party.

In 2012, Oniki ran in the Fukuoka 2nd district as the successor to Taku Yamasaki, who is retiring. He was elected to the House of Representatives for the first time, defeating Shuji Inada, an incumbent member of the Democratic Party of Japan.

In 2014, Oniki was re-elected.

In 2017, Oniki won his third election by defeating Inatomi the Kibō no Tō after a close race. He won election to the Fukuoka 2nd district once again in 2021 by a slim margin.

In the 2024 general election, he failed to win a constituency, but retained a seat as a Kyushu Proportional Representation representative, which he still holds as of August 2025.
