= Mie 2nd district =

Legislative district of Japan

Mie 2nd District
- Parliament constituency for the Japanese House of Representatives
- Numbered map of Mie Prefecture single-member districts
- Prefecture: Mie
- Proportional District: Tōkai
- Electorate: 403,835

Current constituency
- Created: 1994
- Seats: One
- Party: LDP
- Representative: Hideto Kawasaki
- Municipalities: Iga, Kameyama, Nabari, Suzuka, and part of Yokkaichi

Mie 2nd district (三重県第2区, Mie-ken dai-niku or simply 三重2区, Mie-niku) is a single-member constituency of the House of Representatives in the national Diet of Japan located in Mie Prefecture.

== Areas covered ==
=== Since 2017 ===
- Iga
- Kameyama
- Nabari
- Suzuka
- Part of Yokkaichi

=== 2013–2017 ===
- Kameyama
- Suzuka
- Part of Yokkaichi

=== 1994–2013 ===
- Kameyama
- Suzuka
- Part of Yokkaichi
- Mie District
  - Kusu
- Suzuka District

== List of representatives ==
Election	Representative	Party	Notes
1996	Masaharu Nakagawa	New Frontier	
1996	Masaharu Nakagawa	Voice of the People	
1996	Masaharu Nakagawa	Good Governance	
2000	Masaharu Nakagawa	Democratic	
2003	Masaharu Nakagawa	Democratic	
2005	Masaharu Nakagawa	Democratic	
2009	Masaharu Nakagawa	Democratic	
2012	Masaharu Nakagawa	Democratic	
2014	Masaharu Nakagawa	Democratic	
2014	Masaharu Nakagawa	Democratic	
2017	Masaharu Nakagawa	Independent	
2021	Hideto Kawasaki	Liberal Democratic	
2024	Kōsuke Shimono	CDP	
2026	Hideto Kawasaki	Liberal Democratic	

== Election results ==
2026
Party	Candidate	Votes	%	±%
LDP	Hideto Kawasaki (Endorsed by Ishin)	117,495	52.48	▲12.81
Centrist Reform	Kōsuke Shimono	78,118	34.89	▼4.78
Sanseitō	Yukiyasu Mizutani	28,267	12.63	
Registered electors		394,575		
Turnout		223,880	57,72	▲2.06
LDP gain from Centrist Reform				

2024
Party	Candidate	Votes	%	±%
CDP	Kōsuke Shimono	90,930	42,0	▼7.8
LDP	Hideto Kawasaki (elected in Tōkai PR block)	85,863	39.7	▼10.5
Ishin	Ayumi Moriguchi	23,904	11.0	
JCP	Rika Yamamoto	15,753	7.3	
Registered electors		399,223		
Turnout			55.66	▲0.80
CDP gain from LDP				

2021
Party	Candidate	Votes	%	±%
Liberal Democratic (endorsed by Komeito)	Hideto Kawasaki	110,155	50.23	
CDP (endorsed by Socisl Democratic, DPP)	Masaharu Nakagawa (incumbent) (won PR seat)	109,165	49.77	New
Majority		990	0.46	
Registered electors		408,281		
Turnout			54.86	▼1.21
LDP gain from CDP				

2017
Party	Candidate	Votes	%	±%
Independent	Masaharu Nakagawa (incumbent)	122,518	53.90	New
Liberal Democratic (endorsed by Komeito)	Jirō Kawasaki (Mie 1st incumbent) (won PR seat)	104,780	46.10	
Majority		17,738	7.80	
Registered electors		414,741		
Turnout			56.07	▲1.96
Independent hold				

2014
Party	Candidate	Votes	%	±%
Democratic	Masaharu Nakagawa (incumbent)	91,676	52.77	
Liberal Democratic (endorsed by Komeito)	Yoshikazu Shimada (PR seat incumbent) (won PR seat)	63,187	36.37	
Communist	Takeshi Nakano	18,849	10.85	
Majority		28,489	16.40	
Registered electors		329,308		
Turnout			54.11	
Democratic hold				
