= 2021 Japanese general election in Southern Kanto =

- October 31, 2021

All 55 Southern Kanto seats to the House of Representatives
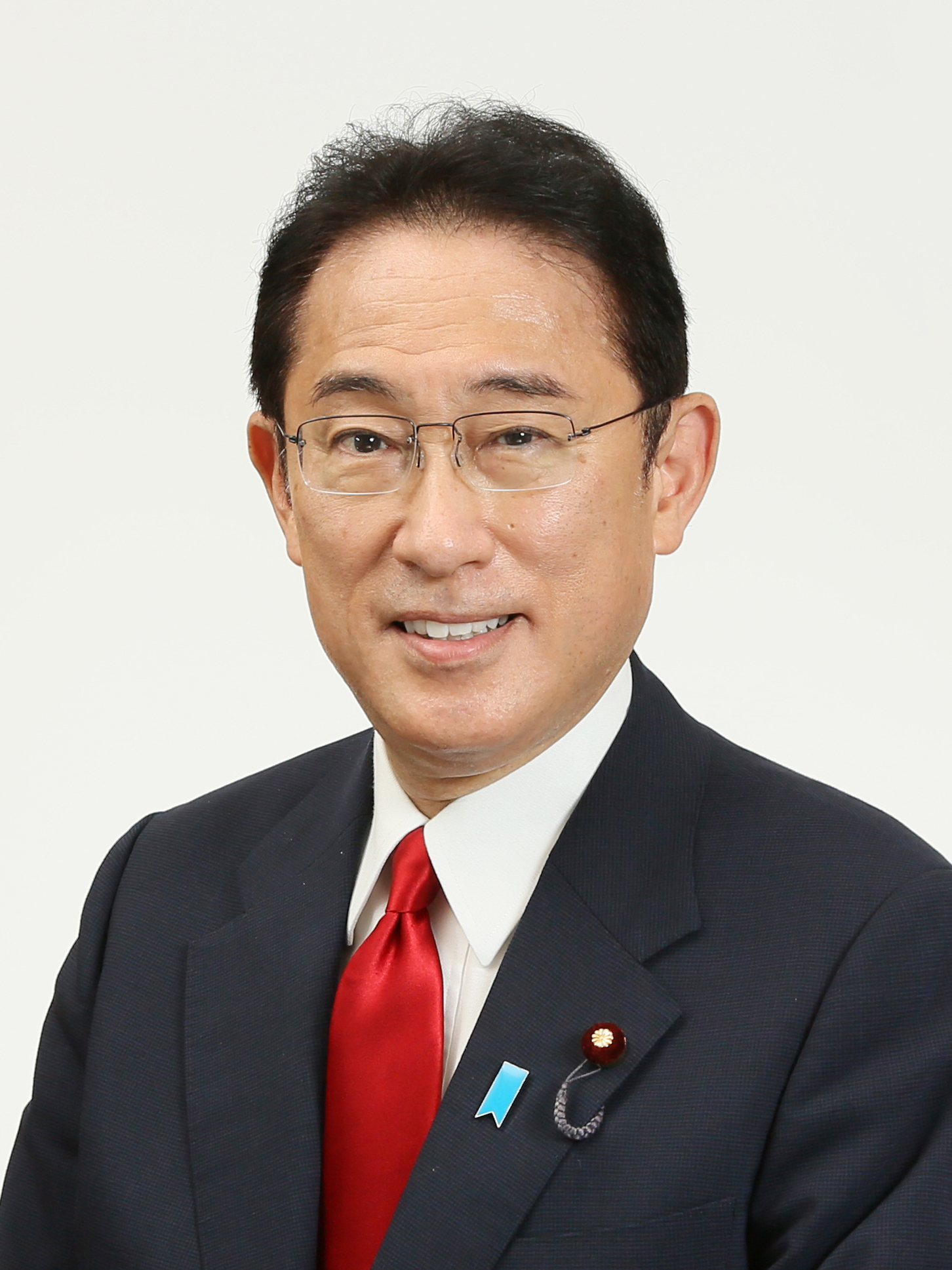

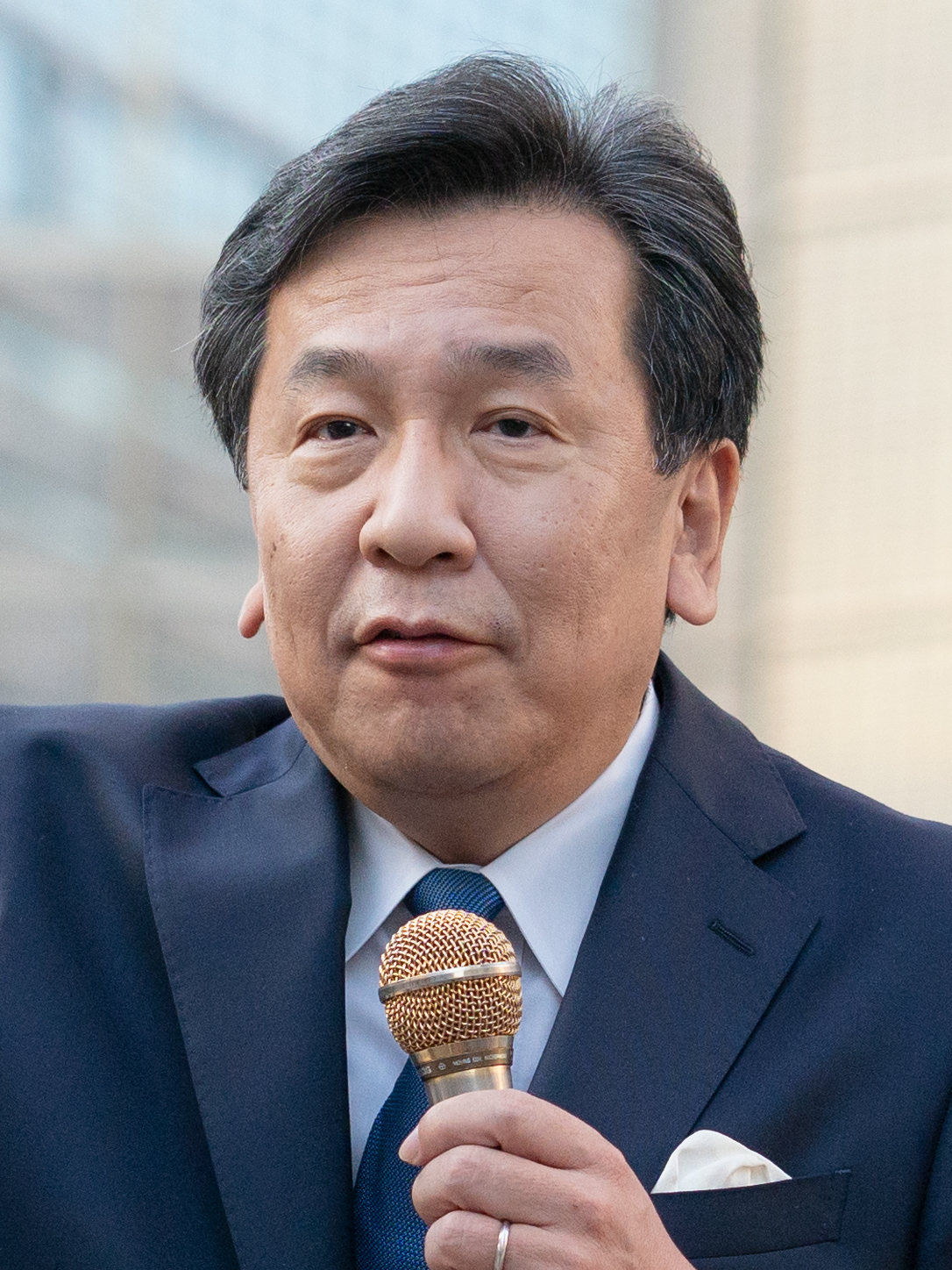

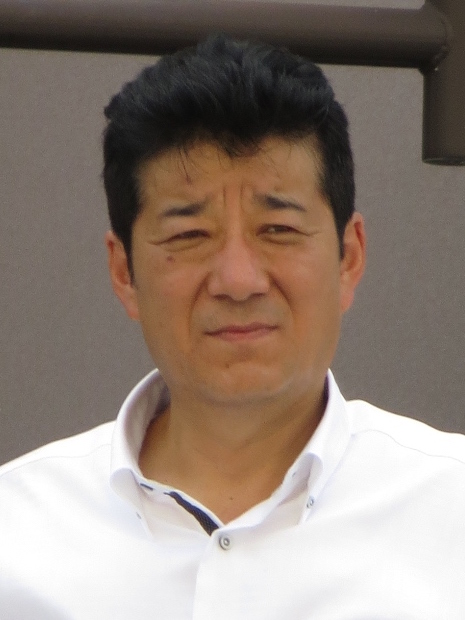

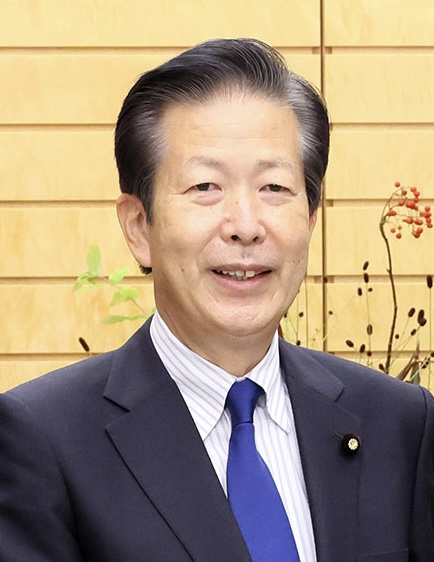

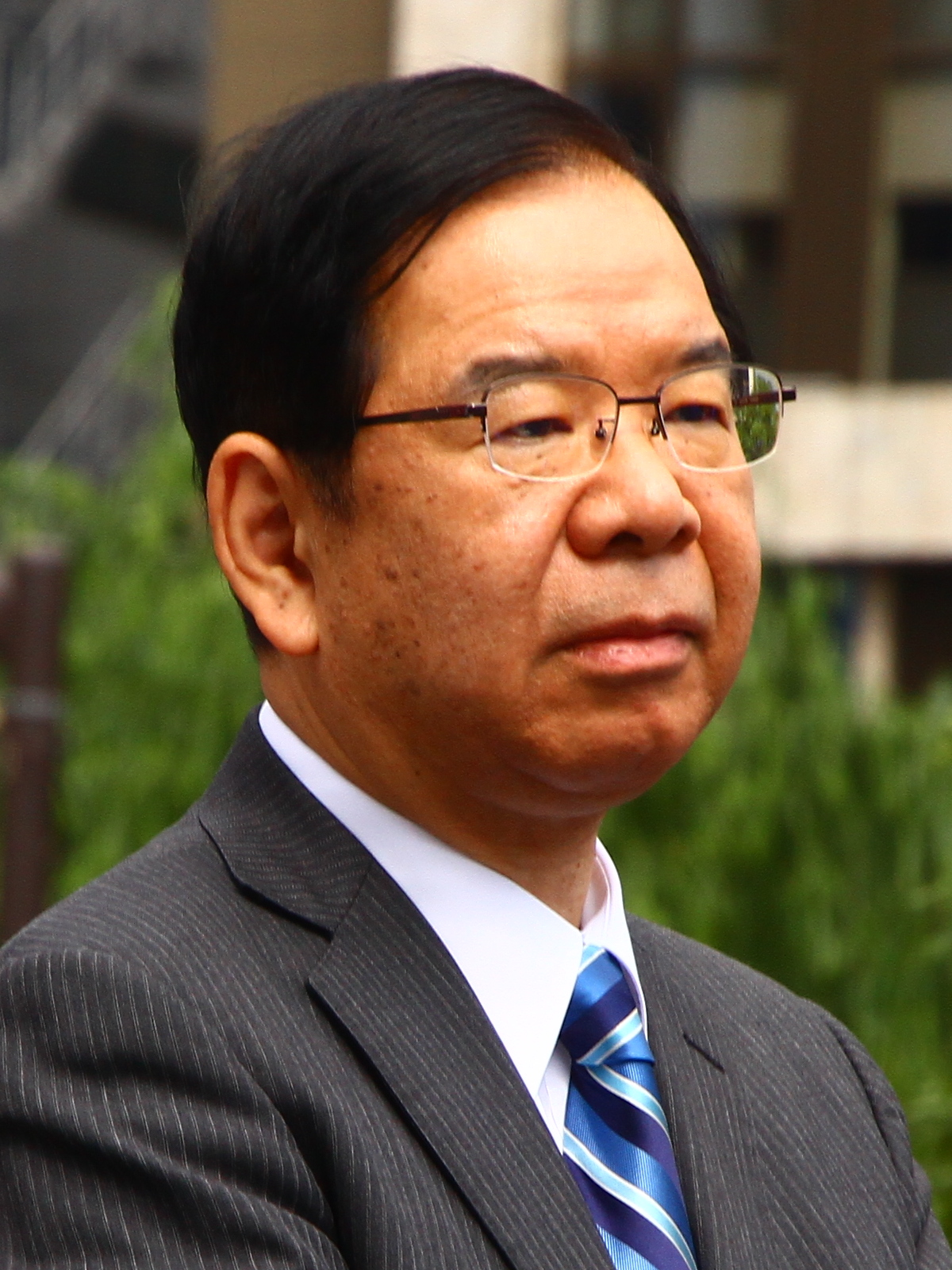

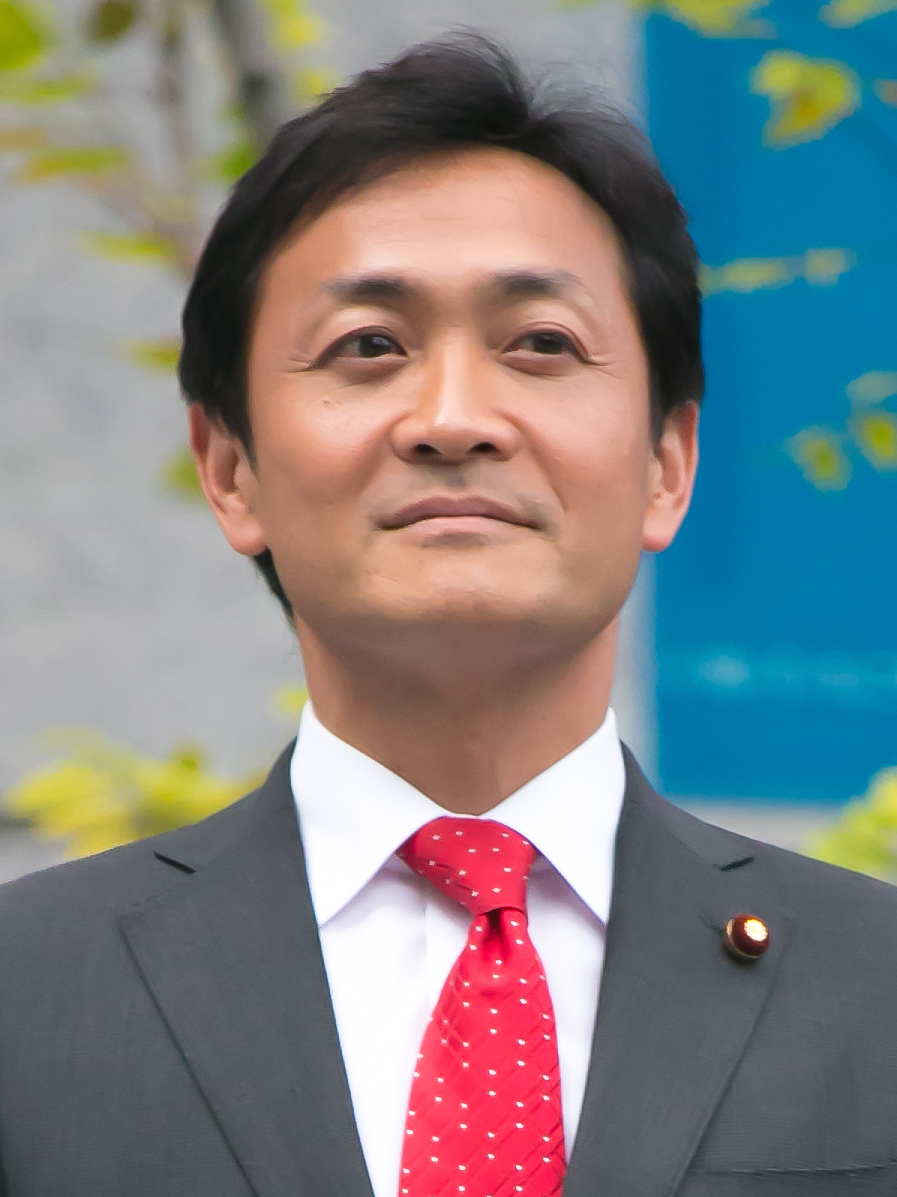

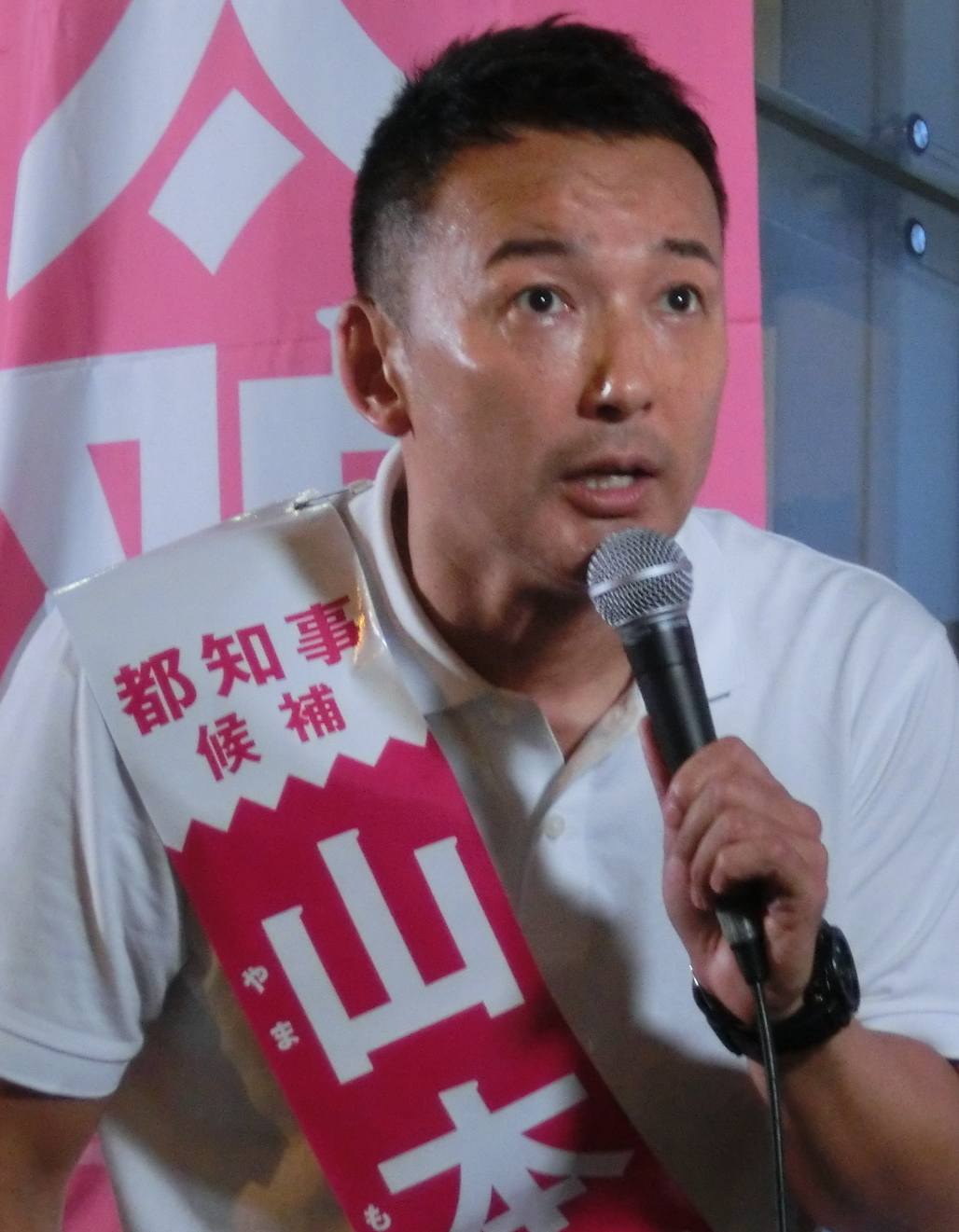
	Majority party	Minority party	Third party
Party	LDP	CDP	Ishin
Last election	33 seats	Did not exist	1 seats
Constituency	22	11	0
Constituency votes	3,638,274	2,714,915	416,637
PR seats	9	5	3
Popular votes	2,590,787	1,651,562	863,897
Total	31	16	3
Seat change	▼2	New	▲2
	Fourth party	Fifth party	Sixth party
Party	Komeito	JCP	DPP
Last election	2 seats	2 seats	Did not exist
Constituency	0	0	0
Constituency votes	-	254,236	54,320
PR seats	2	1	1
Popular votes	850,667	534,493	384,481
Total	2	1	1
Seat change	Steady	▼1	New
	Seventh party
Party	Reiwa
Last election	Did not exist
Constituency	0
Constituency votes	30,432
PR seats	1
Popular votes	302,675
Total	1
Seat change	New

The 2021 Japanese general election in Southern Kanto were held on October 31, 2021, to elect the 55 representatives, one from each of 33 Electoral districts and 22 proportional seats.

== Results summary ==
Party	Constituency				Proportional				Total	
Party	Votes	%	Seats		Votes	%	Seats		Total	
LDP	3,638,274	49.25	22	▼3	2,590,787	34.94	9	▲1	31	▼2
Komeito	ー	ー	0	Steady	850,667	11.47	2	Steady	2	Steady
LDP-Komeito Coalition	3,638,274	49.25	22	▼3	3,441,454	46.41	11	▲1	33	▼2
CDP	2,714,915	36.75	11	New	1,651,562	22.28	5	New	16	New
Ishin	416,637	5.64	0	Steady	863,897	11.65	3	▲2	3	▲2
JCP	254,236	3.44	0	Steady	534,493	7.21	1	▼1	1	▼1
DPP	54,320	0.74	0	New	384,481	5.19	1	New	1	New
Reiwa	30,432		0	New	302,675		1	New	1	New
SDP	46,312		0	Steady	124,447		0	Steady	0	Steady
Anti-NHK	18,140		0	New	111,298		0	New	0	New
Kunimori	10,272		0	New	ー	ー	ー	ー	0	New
Independent	203,550	2.76	0	▼4	ー	ー	ー	ー	0	▼4
Total	7,387,088	100.00	33	Steady	7,414,307	100.00	22	Steady	55	Steady

=== Results by single-seat constituencies ===
Constituency		2017 result	2021 winning party				Votes								
Constituency		2017 result	Party	Votes	Share	Majority	LDP	CDP	Ishin	DPFP	JCP	SDP	Reiwa	Others (Note: Includes independent politicians and all other parties)	Total
Chiba	District 1	LDP	CDP	128,556	56.27%	28,661	99,895	128,556							228,451
Chiba	District 2	LDP	LDP	153,017	62.04%	83,434	153,017	69,583			24,052				246,652
Chiba	District 3	LDP	LDP	106,500	61.87%	40,873	106,500	65,627							172,127
Chiba	District 4	Ind	CDP	154,412	64.55%	69,599	84,813	154,412							239,225
Chiba	District 5	LDP	LDP	111,985	46.97%	42,098	111,985	69,887	32,241	24,307					238,420
Chiba	District 6	LDP	LDP	80,764	42.48%	31,935	80,764		48,829		32,444			28,083	190,120
Chiba	District 7	LDP	LDP	127,548	54.99%	56,500	127,548	71,048	28,594					4,749	231,939
Chiba	District 8	LDP	CDP	135,125	59.65%	53,569	81,556	135,125						9,845	226,526
Chiba	District 9	LDP	CDP	107,322	51.09%	4,581	102,741	107,322							210,063
Chiba	District 10	LDP	LDP	83,822	47.29%	2,851	83,822	80,971						12,445 (Note: Includes an other party candidate (I) and an independent (II) (I) 10,272 (II) 2,173)	177,238
Chiba	District 11	LDP	LDP	110,538	64.44%	79,981	110,538				30,557		30,432		171,527
Chiba	District 12	LDP	LDP	123,210	64.01%	66,463	123,210	56,747			12,530				192,487
Chiba	District 13	LDP	LDP	100,227	45.07%	20,540	100,227	79,687	42,473						222,387
Kanagawa	District 1	LDP	CDP	100,118	45.01%	24,054		100,118	46,271					76,064	222,453
Kanagawa	District 2	LDP	LDP	146,166	61.15%	53,286	146,166	92,880							239,046
Kanagawa	District 3	LDP	LDP	119,199	52.54%	50,742	119,199	68,457			23,310			15,908	226,874
Kanagawa	District 4	CDP	CDP	66,841	33.03%	3,154	47,511	66,841	16,559					71,477 (Note: Includes two independent politicians (I)(II) (I) 63,687 (II) 7,790)	202,388
Kanagawa	District 5	LDP	LDP	136,288	53.47%	17,669	136,288	118,619							254,907
Kanagawa	District 6	CDP	LDP	92,405	44.32%	4,525	92,405	87,880	28,214						208,499
Kanagawa	District 7	LDP	LDP	128,870	50.86%	4,346	128,870	124,524							253,394
Kanagawa	District 8	Ind	CDP	130,925	52.60%	12,962	117,963	130,925							248,888
Kanagawa	District 9	Kibō	CDP	83,847	42.40%	14,929	68,918	83,847	24,547		20,432				197,744
Kanagawa	District 10	LDP	LDP	104,832	41.39%	35,238	104,832		69,594	30,013	48,839				253,278
Kanagawa	District 11	LDP	LDP	147,634	79.17%	108,791	147,634				38,843				186,477
Kanagawa	District 12	CDP	CDP	95,013	42.43%	3,854	91,159	95,013	37,753						223,925
Kanagawa	District 13	LDP	CDP	130,124	51.09%	5,529	124,595	130,124							254,719
Kanagawa	District 14	LDP	LDP	135,197	53.76%	18,924	135,197	116,273							251,470
Kanagawa	District 15	LDP	LDP	210,515	79.32%	164,203	210,515					46,312		8,565	265,392
Kanagawa	District 16	LDP	CDP	137,558	54.60%	23,162	114,396	137,558							251,954
Kanagawa	District 17	LDP	LDP	131,284	55.32%	41,447	131,284	89,837			16,202				237,323
Kanagawa	District 18	LDP	LDP	120,365	47.70%	29,975	120,365	90,390	41,562						252,317
Yamanashi	District 1	Ind	LDP	125,325	50.46%	7,102	125,325	118,223						4,826	248,374
Yamanashi	District 2	Ind	LDP	109,036	67.93%	64,595	109,036	44,441			7,027				160,504

== Chiba 1st district ==
2021 Chiba 1st district election
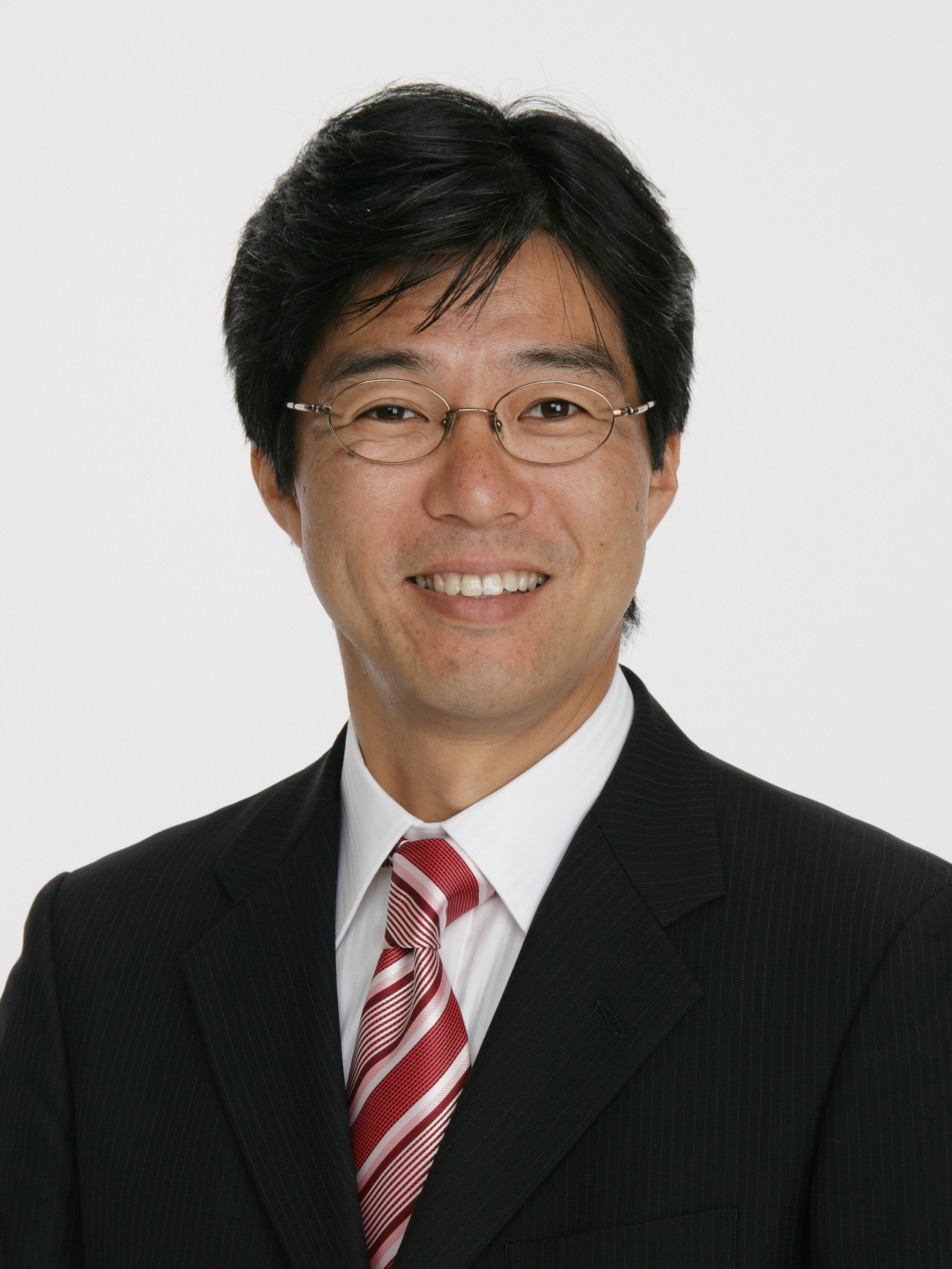

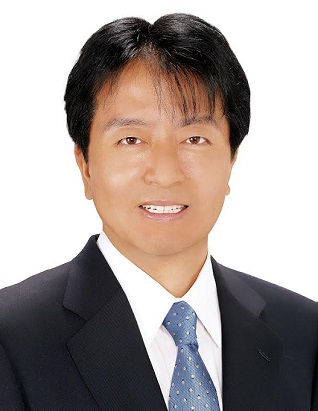
Nominee	Kaname Tajima	Hiroaki Kadoyama
Party	CDP	LDP
Popular vote	128,556	99,895
Percentage	56.27%	43.73%
Representative before election
Hiroaki Kadoyama
LDP
Elected Representative
Kaname Tajima
CDP

=== Background ===
In the last general election, Hiroaki Kadoyama, the Liberal Democratic Party, won a seat after a close race over Kaname Tajima, an incumbent candidate from the Kibō no Tō. Tajima joined the Constitutional Democratic Party in 2020 through the Democratic Party For the People. In this general election, the Japanese Communist Party did not field any candidates and the opposition candidates were unified into Tajima, the CDP. The LDP nominated Kadoyama, the incumbent of Chiba 1st district, as a candidate.

=== Candidates ===
Name	Age	Party	Current positions
Hiroaki Kadoyama	57	Liberal Democratic	Member of the House of Representatives (2012-present) Previous offices held: Parliamentary Secretary for Justice (2018-2019)
Kaname Tajima	60	Constitutional Democratic	Member of the House of Representatives (2003-present); Previous offices held: Parliamentary Vice-Minister; for Economy, Trade and Industry (2010-2011)

=== Result ===
After a one-on-one battle, Tajima beat Kadoyama to regain his seat（Kadoyama won the seat through proportional representation and maintained his position as a member of the House of Representatives.）.

2021 Japanese general election
Party	Candidate	Votes	%
CDP	Kaname Tajima	128,556	56.27%
LDP	Hiroaki Kadoyama (incumbent)	99,895	43.73%
Majority		28,661	12.54%
Total votes		228,451	100%
CDP gain from LDP			

== Chiba 2nd district ==
2021 Chiba 2nd district election
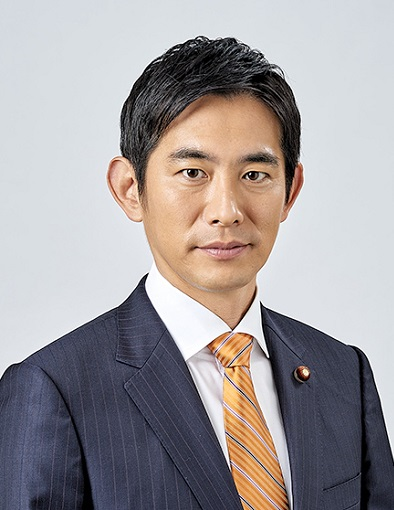

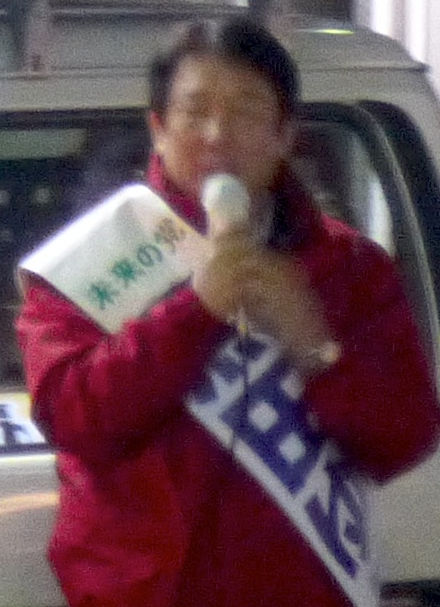
Nominee	Takayuki Kobayashi	Yu Kuroda
Party	LDP	CDP
Popular vote	153,017	69,583
Percentage	62.04%	28.21%
Representative before election
Takayuki Kobayashi
LDP
Elected Representative
Takayuki Kobayashi
LDP

=== Background ===
The Liberal Democratic Party nominated Takayuki Kobayashi, the incumbent of Chiba 2nd district since 2012 and the incumbent Minister of State for Science and Technology Policy of Kishida Cabinet, as its candidate. On the other hand, the Constitutional Democratic Party nominated Yu Kuroda, a former member of the House of Representatives, as its candidate. In addition, the Japanese Communist Party also fielded a candidate.

=== Candidates ===
Name	Age	Party	Current positions
Takayuki Kobayashi	46	Liberal Democratic	Member of the House of Representatives (2012-present); Minister of State for Science and Technology Policy (2021-present); Previous offices held: Parliamentary Secretary for Defense (2016-2017)
Yu Kuroda	62	Constitutional Democratic	None Previous offices held: Member of the House of Representatives (2009-2012)
Satoshi Terao	45	Communist	None Previous offices held: Member of Member of Chiba Prefectural Assembly

=== Result ===
Kobayashi was re-elected after beating other candidates by a large margin.

2021 Japanese general election
Party	Candidate	Votes	%
LDP	Takayuki Kobayashi (incumbent)	153,017	62.04%
CDP	Yu Kuroda	69,583	28.21%
JCP	Satoshi Terao	24,052	9.75%
Majority		83,434	33.83%
Total votes		246,652	100%
LDP hold			

== Chiba 3rd district ==
2021 Chiba 3rd district election
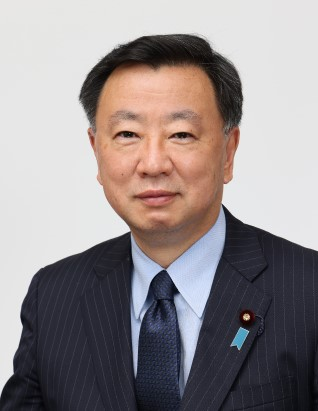
Nominee	Hirokazu Matsuno	Kazumasa Okajima
Party	LDP	CDP
Popular vote	106,500	65,627
Percentage	61.87%	38.13%
Representative before election
Hirokazu Matsuno
LDP
Elected Representative
Hirokazu Matsuno
LDP

=== Background ===
The Liberal Democratic Party nominated Hirokazu Matsuno, the incumbent of Chiba 3rd district and the incumbent Chief Cabinet Secretary, as a candidate. The Constitutional Democratic Party nominated Kazumasa Okajima, an incumbent member of the House of Representatives from Southern Kanto proportional representation block and the Secretary-General of the CDP’s Chiba Prefectural federation, as a candidate.

=== Candidates ===
Name	Age	Party	Current positions
Hirokazu Matsuno	59	Liberal Democratic	Member of the House of Representatives (2000-present); Chief Cabinet Secretary (2021-present); Previous offices held: Minister of Education, Culture, Sports, Science and Technology (2016-2017); State Minister of Education, Culture, Sports, Science and Technology (2008-2009)
Kazumasa Okajima	63	Constitutional Democratic	Member of the House of Representatives (2017-present); the Secretary-General of the CDP’s Chiba Prefectural federation; Previous offices held: Member of the House of Representatives (2003-2005) (2009-2012)

=== Result ===
Matsuno was re-elected after defeating Okajima. Unlike the last general election, Okajima failed to win a proportional representation seat.

2021 Japanese general election
Party	Candidate	Votes	%
LDP	Hirokazu Matsuno (incumbent)	106,500	61.87%
CDP	Kazumasa Okajima	65,627	38.13%
Majority		40,873	23.74%
Total votes		172,127	100%
LDP hold			

== Chiba 4th district ==
2021 Chiba 4th district election
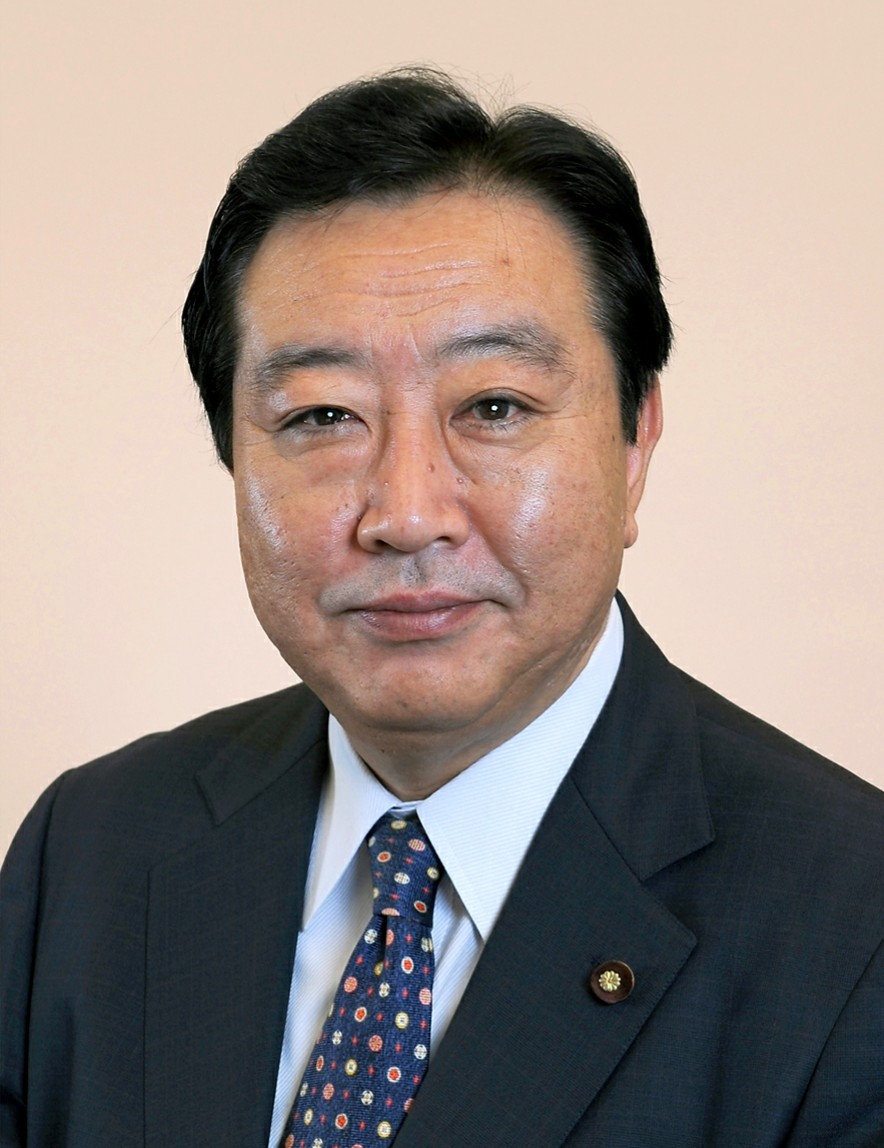

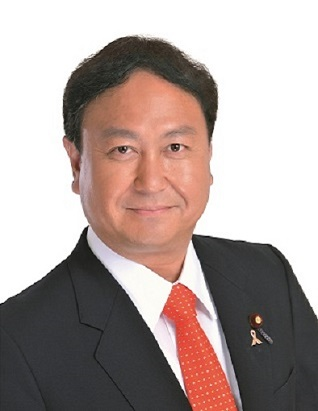
Nominee	Yoshihiko Noda	Tetsuya Kimura
Party	CDP	LDP
Popular vote	154,412	84,813
Percentage	64.55%	35.45%
Representative before election
Yoshihiko Noda
CDP
Elected Representative
Yoshihiko Noda
CDP

=== Background ===
After the Democratic Party split in 2017, Yoshihiko Noda, a Former Prime Minister and a veteran politician, joined neither and was an independent. In 2020, when the original Constitutional Democratic Party and the Democratic Party For the People merged, Noda agreed. Eventually, he joined the newly formed Constitutional Democratic Party.

=== Candidates ===
Name	Age	Party	Current positions
Tetsuya Kimura	52	Liberal Democratic	Member of the House of Representatives (2017-present); Parliamentary Vice-Minister of Cabinet Office (2021-present); Previous offices held: Member of the Chiba Prefectural Assembly (2011-2014); Member of the Funabashi City Council (1999-2011)
Yoshihiko Noda	64	Constitutional Democratic	Member of the House of Representatives (2000-present); Chief Adviser of the CDP (2020-present); Previous offices held: Prime Minister of Japan (2011-2012); Secretary-General of the Democratic Party (2016-2017); Minister of Finance (2010-2011); State Minister of Finance (2009-2010); Member of the House of Representatives (1993-1996); Member of the Chiba Prefectural Assembly (1987-1993)

=== Result ===
Noda defeated Kimura by a large margin.

Unlike the last election, Kimura failed to win a Southern proportional representation block seat.

2021 Japanese general election
Party	Candidate	Votes	%
CDP	Yoshihiko Noda (incumbent)	154,412	64.55%
LDP	Tetsuya Kimura	84,813	35.45%
Majority		69,599	29.10%
Total votes		239,225	100%
CDP hold			

== Chiba 5th district ==
2021 Chiba 5th district election
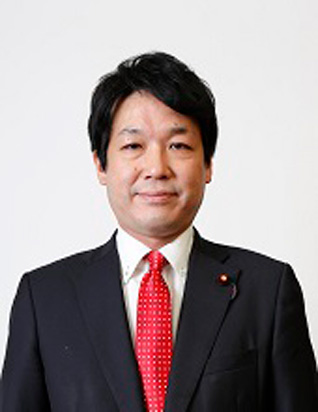
Nominee	Kentaro Sonoura	Kentaro Yazaki	Tamotsu Shiiki
Party	LDP	CDP	Ishin
Popular vote	111,985	69,887	32,241
Percentage	46.97%	29.31%	13.52%
Nominee	Atsushi Tokita
Party	DPP
Popular vote	24,307
Percentage	10.19%
Japanese Representative before election
Kentaro Sonoura
LDP
Elected Japanese Representative
Kentaro Sonoura
LDP

=== Background ===
The Liberal Democratic Party nominated Kentaro Sonoura, the incumbent member of the House of Representatives from Chiba 5th district, as its candidate.

In opposition parties, the Constitutional Democratic Party and Ishin, and the Democratic Party for the People fielded candidates, and opposition parties failed to unify candidates.

=== Candidates ===
Name	Age	Party	Current positions
Kentaro Sonoura	49	Liberal Democratic	Member of the House of Representatives (2012-present); Previous offices held: Special Advisor to the Prime Minister of Japan (2017-2019); State Minister for Foreign Affairs (2016-2017); Parliamentary Vice-Minister for Foreign Affairs (2014-2015); Member of the House of Representatives (2005-2009)
Kentaro Yazaki	54	Constitutional Democratic	None; Previous offices held: Member of the Chiba Prefectural Assembly
Tamotsu Shiiki	55	Ishin	None; Previous offices held: Member of the House of Representatives (2012-2014, 2015-2017)
Atsushi Tokita	55	DPFP	None; Previous offices held: a TV Tokyo employee

=== Result ===
Sonoura defeated other candidates.

2021 Japanese general election
Party	Candidate	Votes	%
LDP	Kentaro Sonoura (incumbent)	111,985	46.97%
CDP	Kentaro Yazaki	69,887	29.31%
Ishin	Tamotsu Shiiki	32,241	13.52%
DPP	Atsushi Tokita	24,307	10.19%
Majority		42,098	17.66%
Total votes		238,420	100%
LDP hold			

== Chiba 6th district ==
2021 Chiba 6th district election
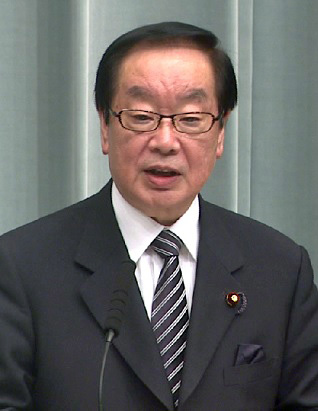

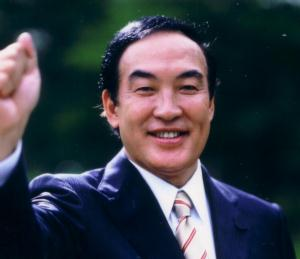
Nominee	Hiromichi Watanabe	Kenta Fujimaki	Fumiko Asano
Party	LDP	Ishin	JCP
Popular vote	80,764	48,829	32,444
Percentage	42.48%	25.68%	17.07%
Nominee	Yukio Ubukata
Party	Independent
Popular vote	28,083
Percentage	14.77%
Japanese Representative before election
Hiromichi Watanabe
LDP
Elected Japanese Representative
Hiromichi Watanabe
LDP

=== Background ===
The Liberal Democratic Party nominated Hiromichi Watanabe, the incumbent member of the House of Representatives from Chiba 6th district, as its candidate. In opposition parties, the Constitutional Democratic Party and the Ishin planned to field candidates.

The CDP initially tried to nominate Yukio Ubukata, an incumbent member of the House of Representatives from Southern Kanto proportional representation block and the Chairman of the Chiba Prefectural Federation of the CDP. However, Ubukata was criticized for his remarks on North Korean abductions of Japanese citizens. When Ubukata discussed the abduction of Japanese by North Korea at the rally just before the general election, he mentioned Megumi Tokota, one of the abductees and a symbol of North Korean abductions, and insisted "Nobody thinks she is still alive. None of the (ruling) Liberal Democratic Party’s lawmakers do, either. If she were alive, (North Korea) would have returned her." In addition, Regarding the abductees who returned after negotiations, Ubukata said, "We should have returned them to North Korea after a certain period of time, as promised with North Korea," adding that Koizumi's decision to refuse to return them to North Korea was wrong. The family association of abductees protested Ubukata's remarks, and Sakie Yokota, the mother of abductee Megumi Yokota, said, "I was surprised that there were Japanese like this. We believe the abductees are alive." CDP Secretary-General Tetsuro Fukuyama and Yuko Mori, who heads the party’s headquarters on the issue of abduction, responded with an emergency statement that distanced the party from his comments. They said his remarks were “completely at odds with the party’s thinking” and “deeply hurt families of the abductees and all people involved with resolving the abduction issue.” The party said it has severely reprimanded Ubukata. As a result of a slip of tongue, Ubukata resigned as chairman of the Constitutional Democratic Party's Chiba prefectural federation and left the Constitutional Democratic Party.

The Ishin nominated Kenta Fujimaki whose father is Takeshi Fujimaki, a former member of the House of Councillors, as its candidate. Following Ubukata's departure from the CDP, the Japanese Communist Party, which had not fielded a candidate for election cooperation with the CDP, also fielded a candidate.

=== Candidates ===
Name	Age	Party	Current positions
Hiromichi Watanabe	71	Liberal Democratic	Member of the House of Representatives (2012-present); Previous offices held: Minister of Reconstruction (2018-2019); State Minister of Economy, Trade and Industry (2006-2007); Parliamentary Vice-Minister of Cabinet Office (2001-2002); Member of the House of Representatives (1996-2009)
Kenta Fujimaki	38	Ishin	None; Previous offices held: a Mizuho Banker
Fumiko Asano	51	Communist	Vice Chairman of the Chiba Prefectural Committee of the Japanese Communist Party
Yukio Ubukata	74	Independent	Member of the House of Representatives (2017-present); Previous offices held: State Minister of Environment (2012); Member of the House of Representatives (1996-2005, 2009-2014)

=== Result ===
Watanabe defeated other candidates and Ubukata lost many votes he had gained in the last election and placed fourth. On the other hand, Fujimaki won the proportional representation block seat.

2021 Japanese general election
Party	Candidate	Votes	%
LDP	Hiromichi Watanabe (incumbent)	80,764	42.48%
Ishin	Kenta Fujimaki	48,829	25.68%
JCP	Fumiko Asano	32,444	17.07%
Independent	Yukio Ubukata	28,083	14.77%
Majority		31,935	16.80%
Total votes		190,120	100%
LDP hold			

== Chiba 7th district ==
2021 Chiba 7th district election
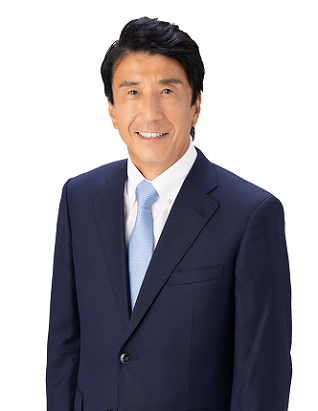

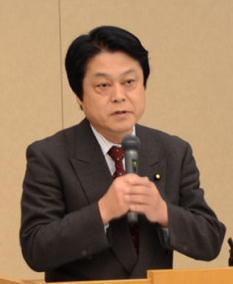
Nominee	Ken Saitō	Chiharu Takeuchi	Akira Uchiyama
Party	LDP	CDP	Ishin
Popular vote	127,548	71,048	28,594
Percentage	54.99%	30.63%	12.33%
Japanese Representative before election
Ken Saitō
LDP
Elected Japanese Representative
Ken Saitō
LDP

Incumbent				Elected Member	
Member	Party	First elected	Status	Member	Party
Ken Saitō	LDP	2009	Incumbent reelected.	Ken Saitō	LDP

== Chiba 8th district ==
2021 Chiba 8th district election
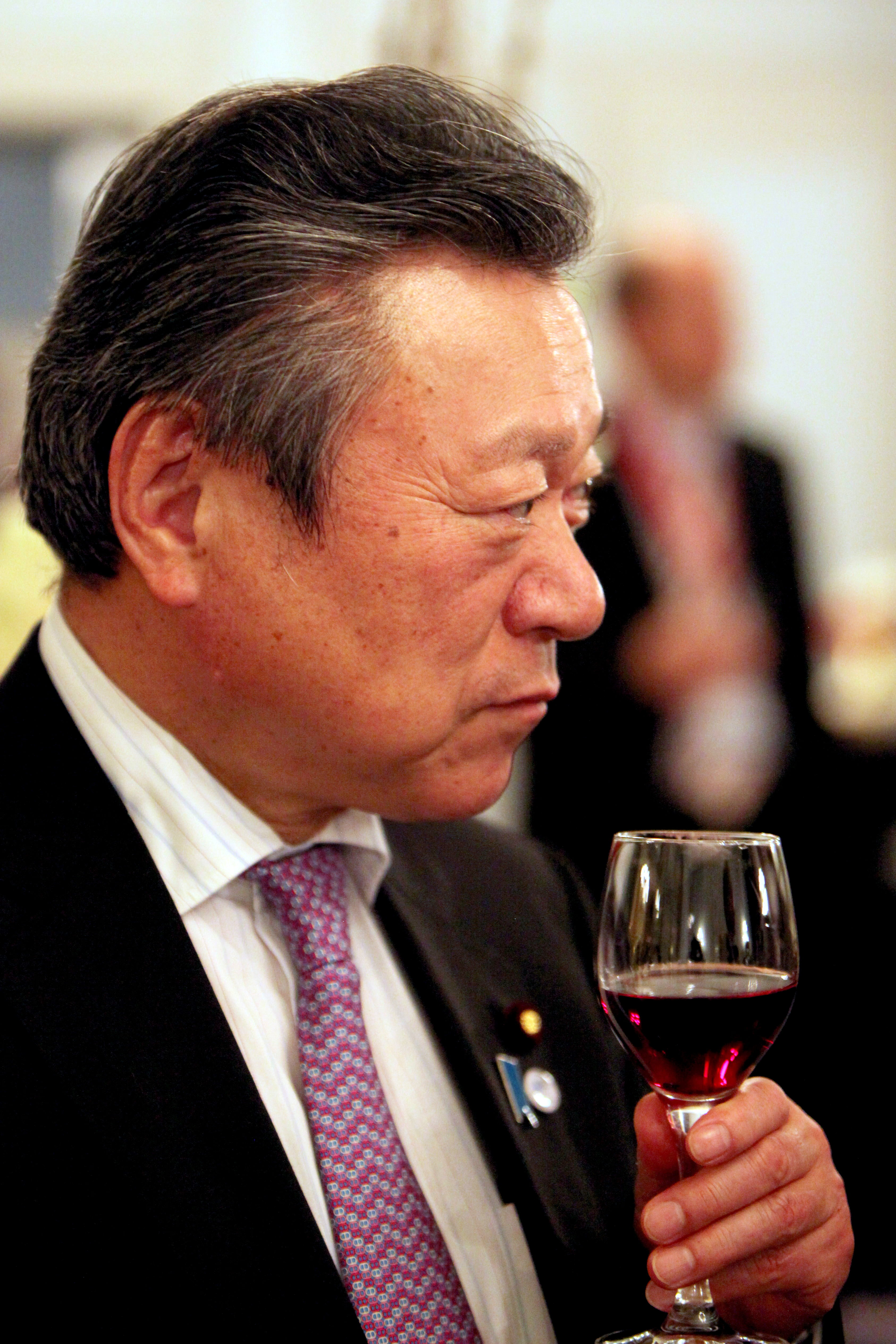
Nominee	Satoshi Honjo	Yoshitaka Sakurada
Party	CDP	LDP
Popular vote	135,125	81,556
Percentage	59.65%	36.00%
Japanese Representative before election
Yoshitaka Sakurada
LDP
Elected Japanese Representative
Satoshi Honjo
CDP

Incumbent				Elected Member	
Member	Party	First elected	Status	Member	Party
Yoshitaka Sakurada	LDP	1996	Incumbent defeated. (Won PR seat.)	Satoshi Honjo	CDP

== Chiba 9th district ==
2021 Chiba 9th district election
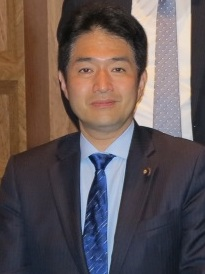

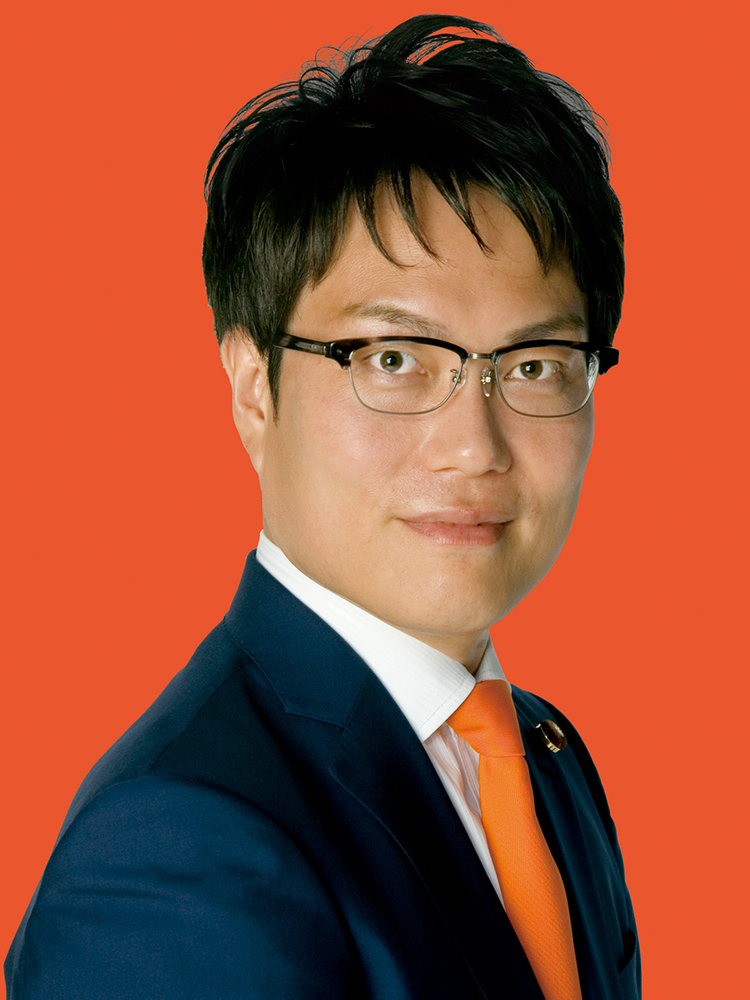
Nominee	Soichiro Okuno	Masatoshi Akimoto
Party	CDP	LDP
Popular vote	107,322	102,741
Percentage	51.09%	48.91%
Japanese Representative before election
Masatoshi Akimoto
LDP
Elected Japanese Representative
Soichiro Okuno
CDP

Incumbent				Elected Member	
Member	Party	First elected	Status	Member	Party
Masatoshi Akimoto	LDP	2012	Incumbent defeated. (Won PR seat.)	Soichiro Okuno	CDP

== Chiba 10th district ==
2021 Chiba 10th district election
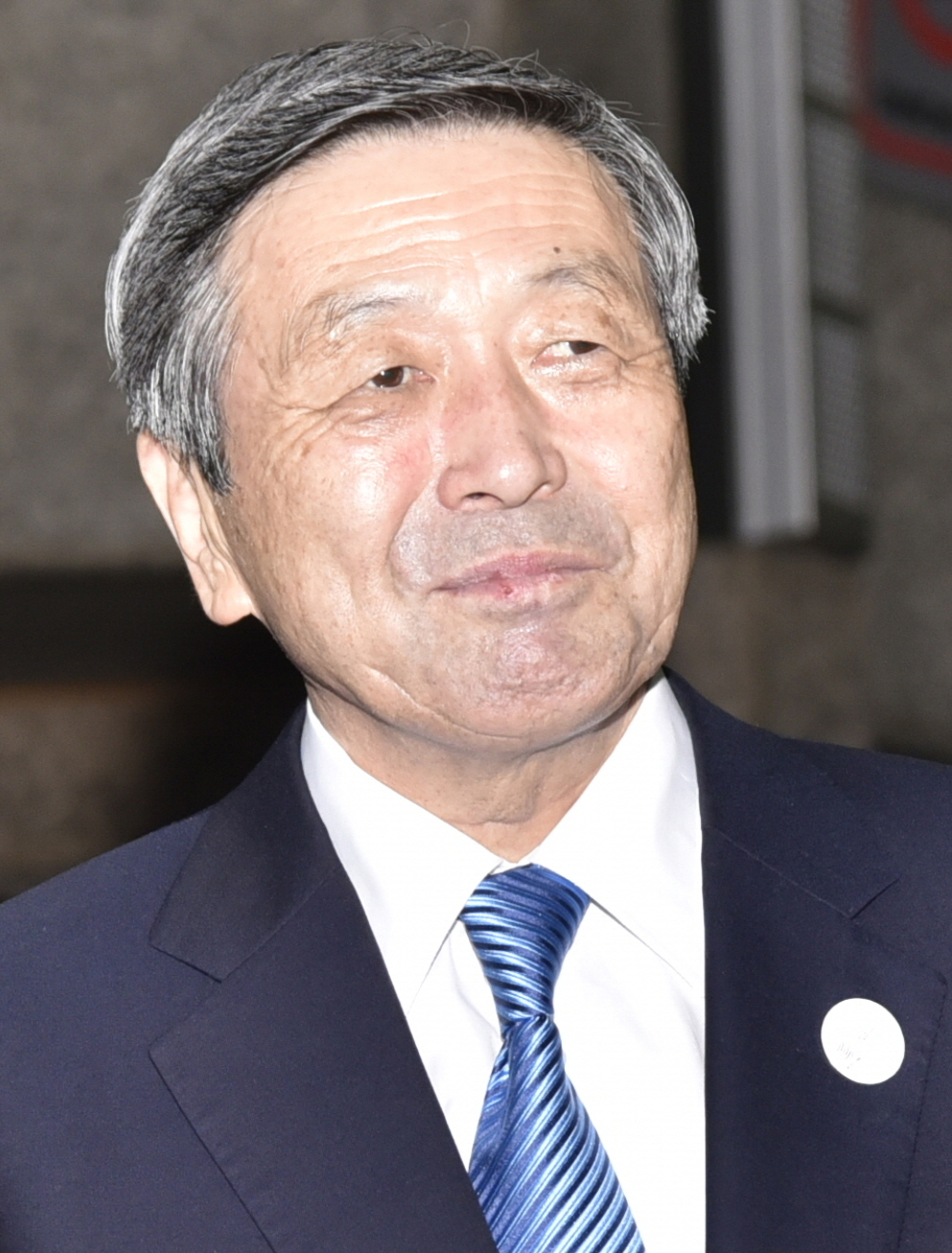
Nominee	Motoo Hayashi	Hajime Yatagawa
Party	LDP	CDP
Popular vote	83,822	80,971
Percentage	47.29%	45.68%
Japanese Representative before election
Motoo Hayashi
LDP
Elected Japanese Representative
Motoo Hayashi
LDP

Incumbent				Elected Member	
Member	Party	First elected	Status	Member	Party
Motoo Hayashi	LDP	1993	Incumbent reelected.	Motoo Hayashi	LDP

== Chiba 11th district ==
2021 Chiba 11th district election
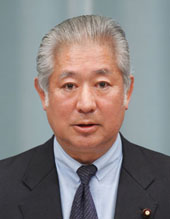
Nominee	Eisuke Mori	Fumiaki Shiina	Ryo Tagaya
Party	LDP	JCP	Reiwa
Popular vote	110,538	30,557	30,432
Percentage	64.44%	17.81%	17.74%
Japanese Representative before election
Eisuke Mori
LDP
Elected Japanese Representative
Eisuke Mori
LDP

Incumbent				Elected Member	
Member	Party	First elected	Status	Member	Party
Eisuke Mori	LDP	1990	Incumbent reelected.	Eisuke Mori	LDP

== Chiba 12th district ==
2021 Chiba 12th district election
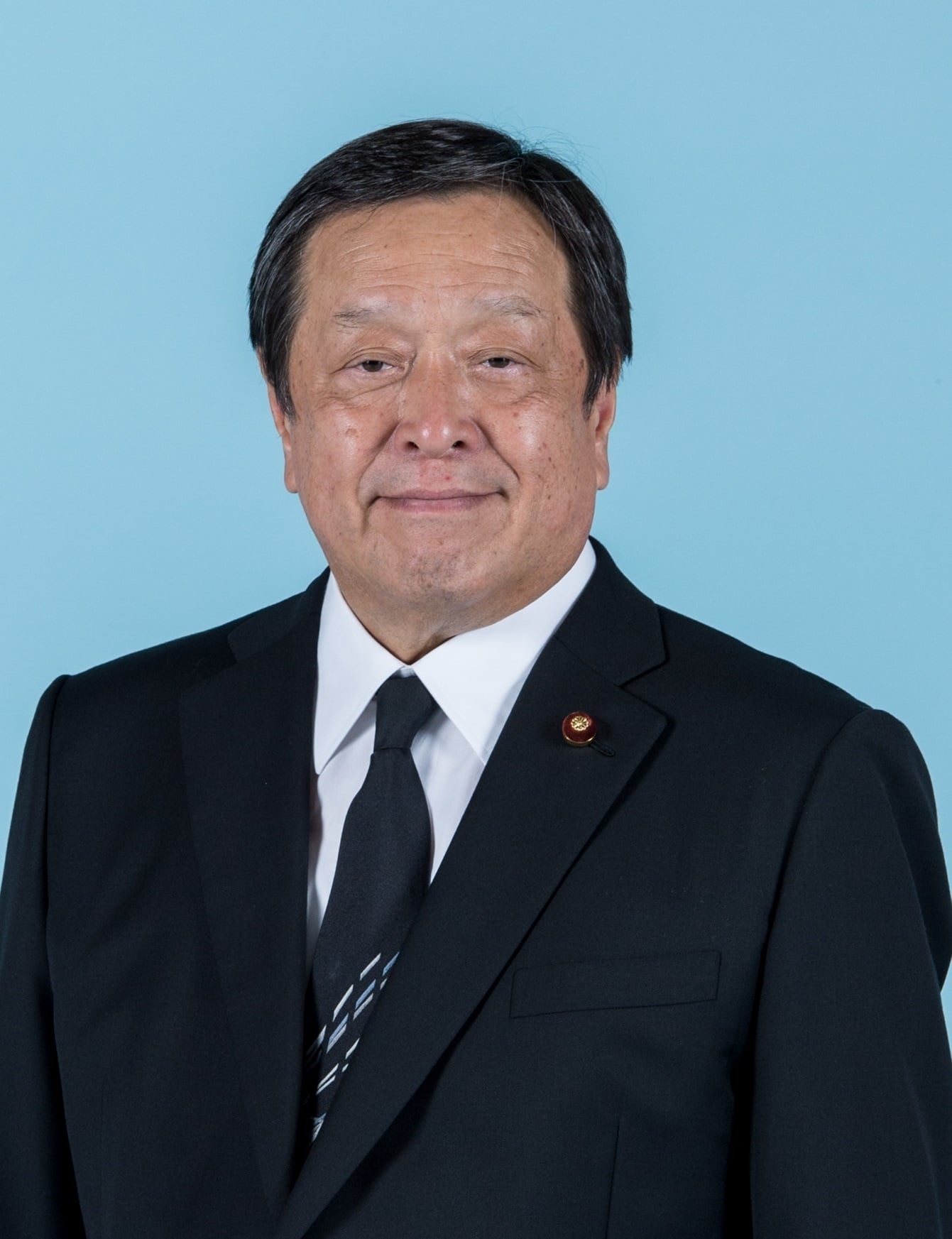

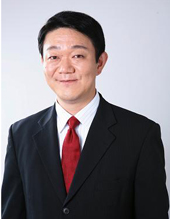
Nominee	Yasukazu Hamada	Takeshi Hidaka
Party	LDP	CDP
Popular vote	123,210	56,747
Percentage	64.01%	29.48%
Japanese Representative before election
Yasukazu Hamada
LDP
Elected Japanese Representative
Yasukazu Hamada
LDP

Incumbent				Elected Member	
Member	Party	First elected	Status	Member	Party
Yasukazu Hamada	LDP	1993	Incumbent reelected.	Yasukazu Hamada	LDP

== Chiba 13th district ==
2021 Chiba 13th district election
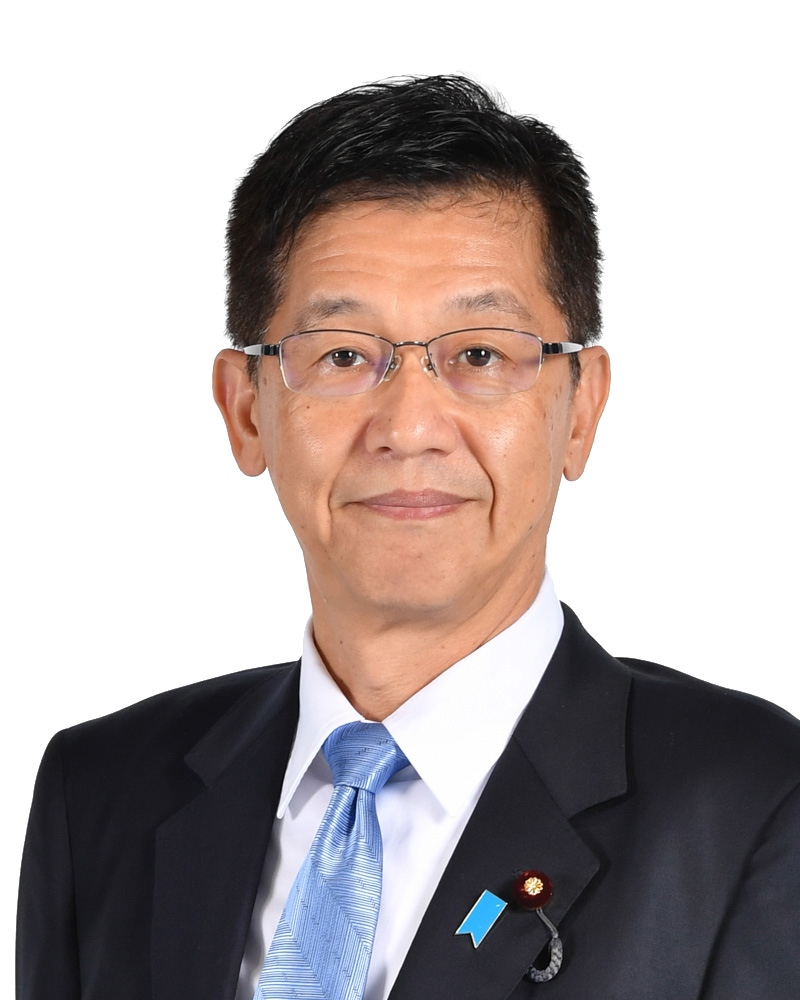
Nominee	Hisashi Matsumoto	Shin Miyakawa	Kiyoshi Shimizu
Party	LDP	CDP	Ishin
Popular vote	100,227	79,687	42,473
Percentage	45.07%	35.83%	19.10%
Japanese Representative before election
Takaki Shirasuka
Independent
Elected Japanese Representative
Hisashi Matsumoto
LDP

Incumbent				Elected Member	
Member	Party	First elected	Status	Member	Party
Takaki Shirasuka	Independent	2012	Incumbent retired. LDP pick up.	Hisashi Matsumoto	LDP

== Kanagawa 1st district ==
2021 Kanagawa 1st district election
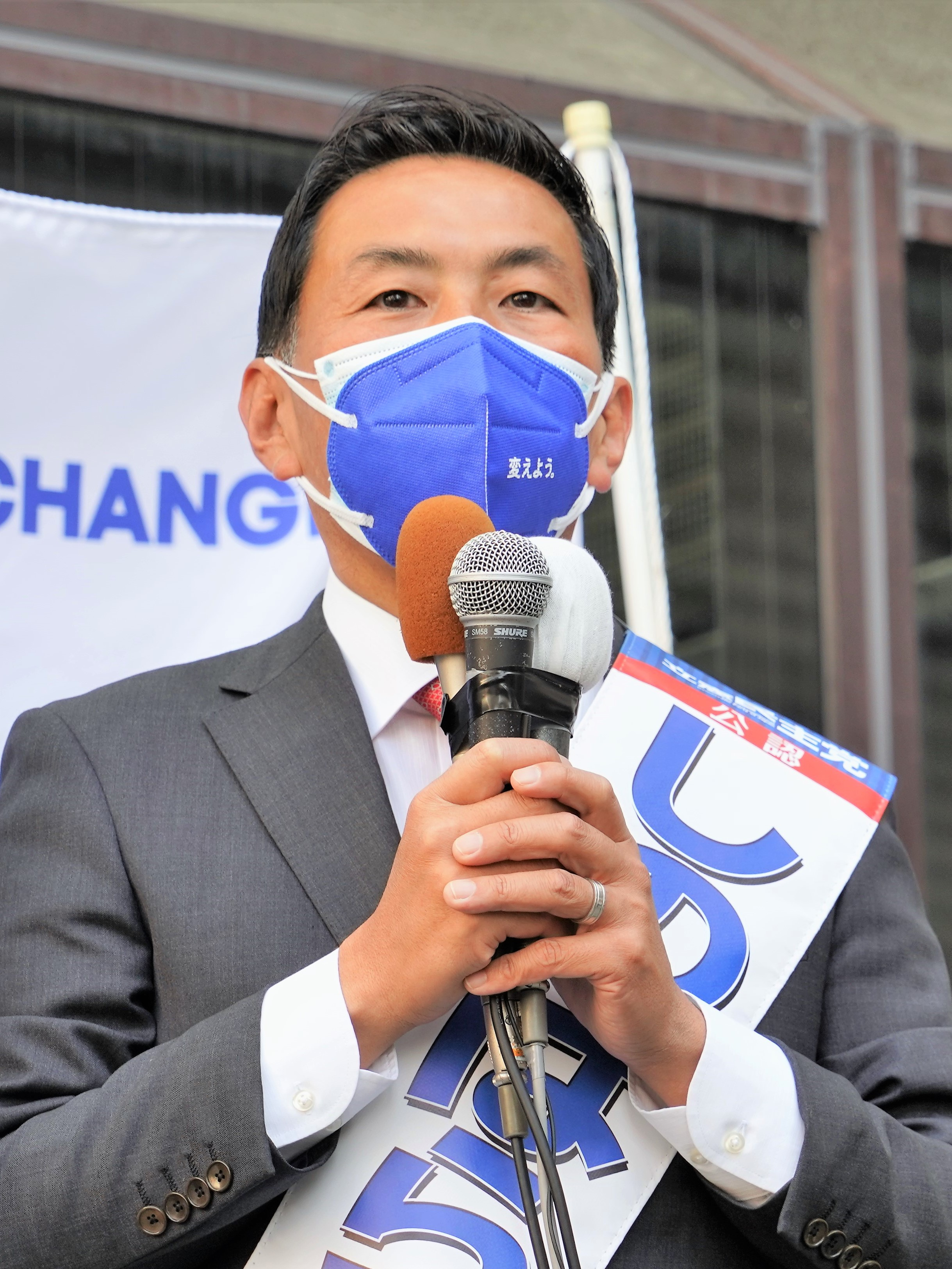

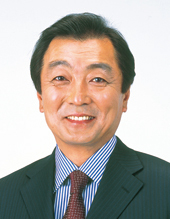

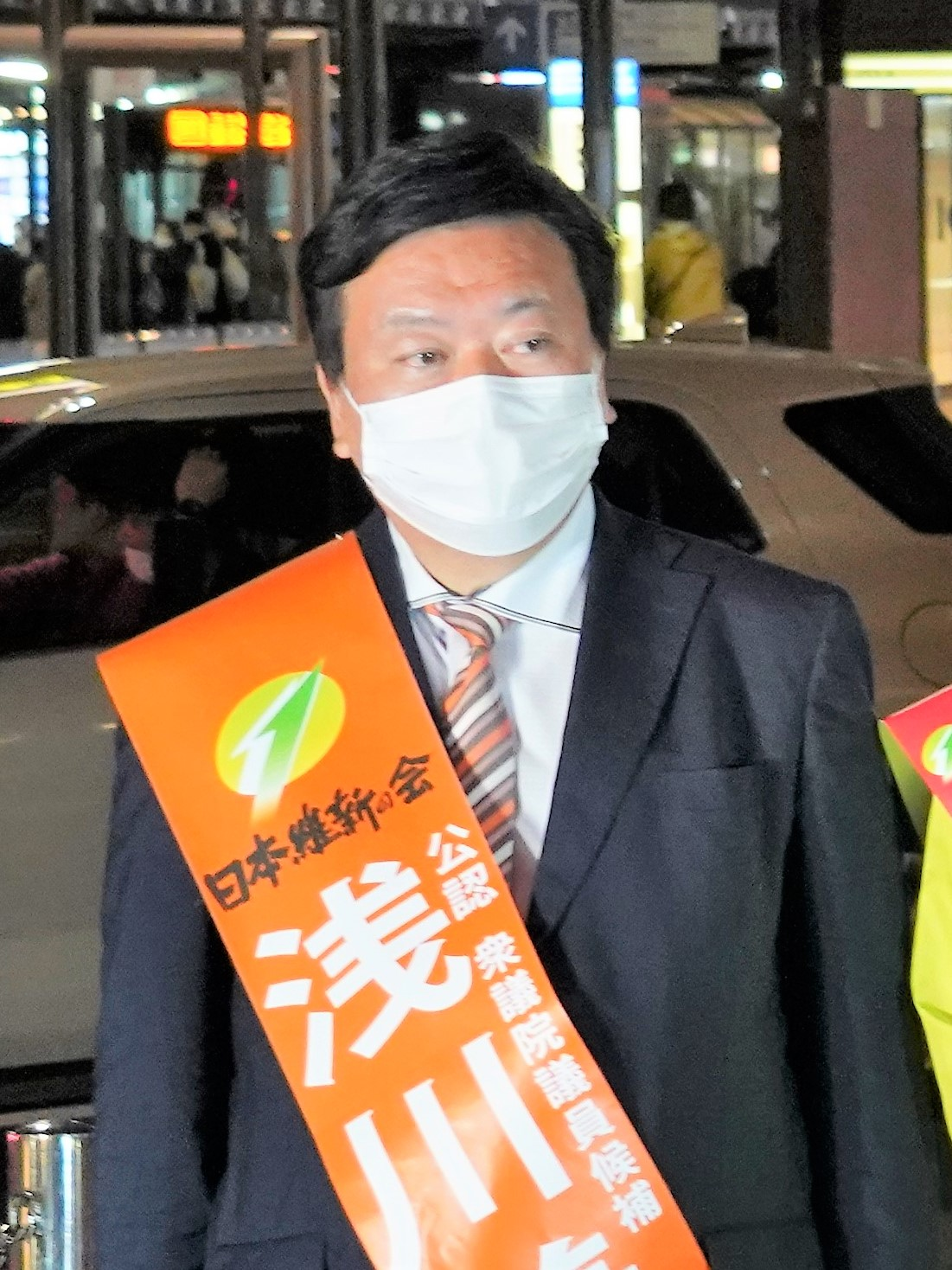
Nominee	Gō Shinohara	Jun Matsumoto	Yoshiharu Asakawa
Party	CDP	Independent	Ishin
Popular vote	100,118	76,064	46,271
Percentage	45.01%	34.19%	20.80%
Japanese Representative before election
Jun Matsumoto
Independent
Elected Japanese Representative
Gō Shinohara
CDP

Incumbent				Elected Member	
Member	Party	First elected	Status	Member	Party
Jun Matsumoto	Independent	1996	Incumbent defeated.	Gō Shinohara	CDP

== Kanagawa 2nd district ==
2021 Kanagawa 2nd district election
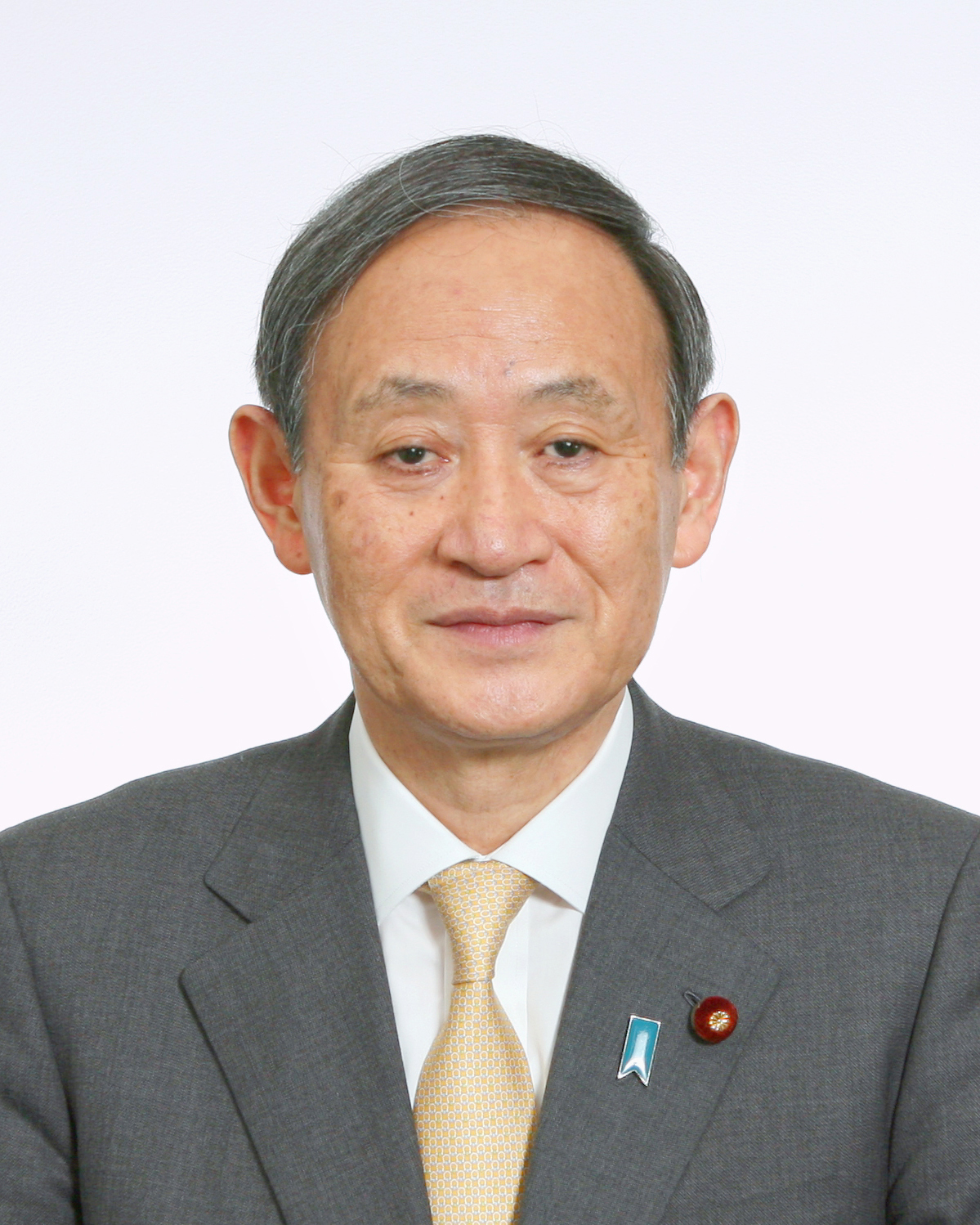

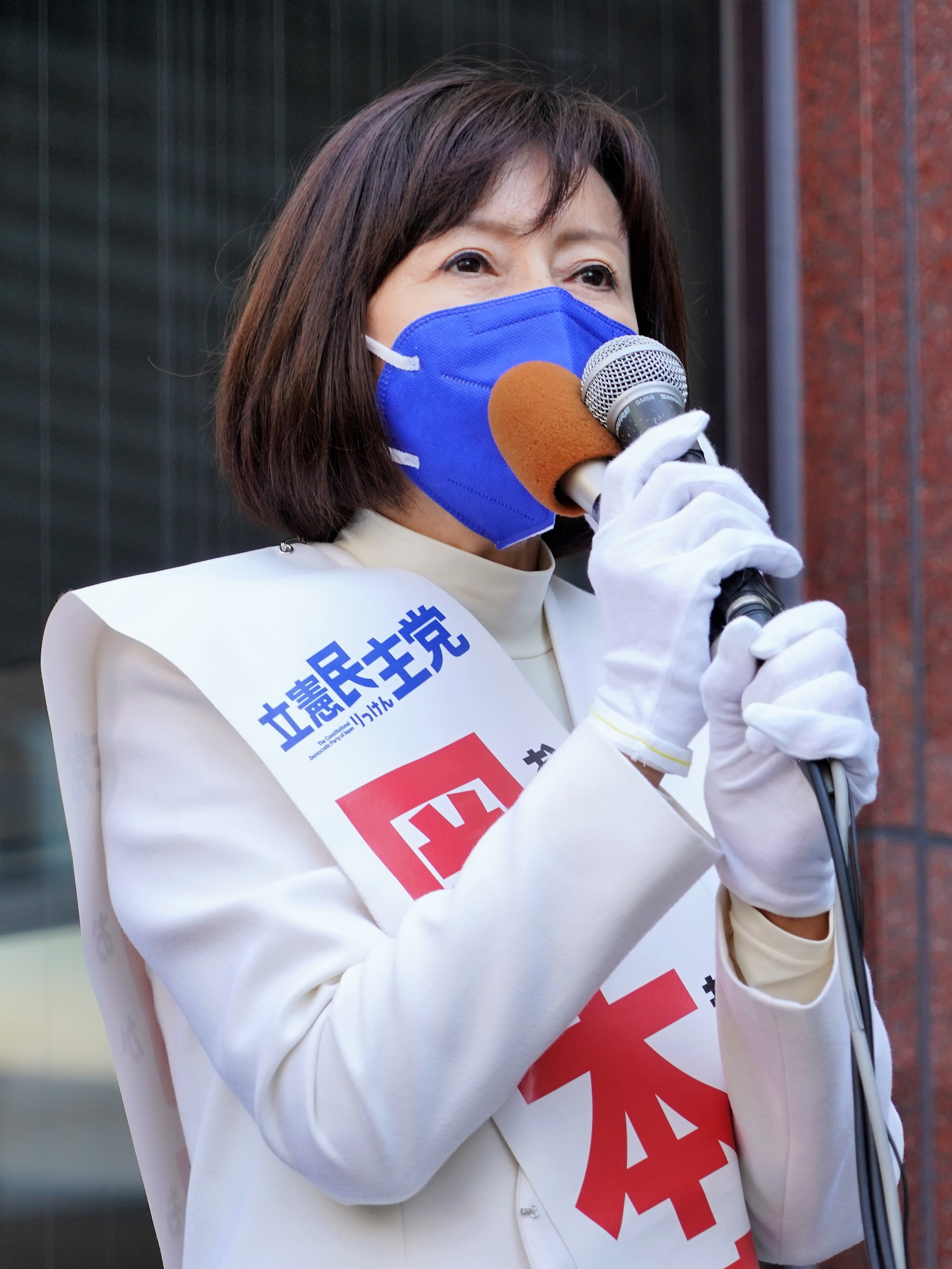
Nominee	Yoshihide Suga	Eiko Okamoto
Party	LDP	CDP
Popular vote	146,166	92,880
Percentage	61.15%	38.85%
Japanese Representative before election
Yoshihide Suga
LDP
Elected Japanese Representative
Yoshihide Suga
LDP

Incumbent				Elected Member	
Member	Party	First elected	Status	Member	Party
Yoshihide Suga	LDP	1996	Incumbent reelected.	Yoshihide Suga	LDP

== Kanagawa 3rd district ==
2021 Kanagawa 3rd district election
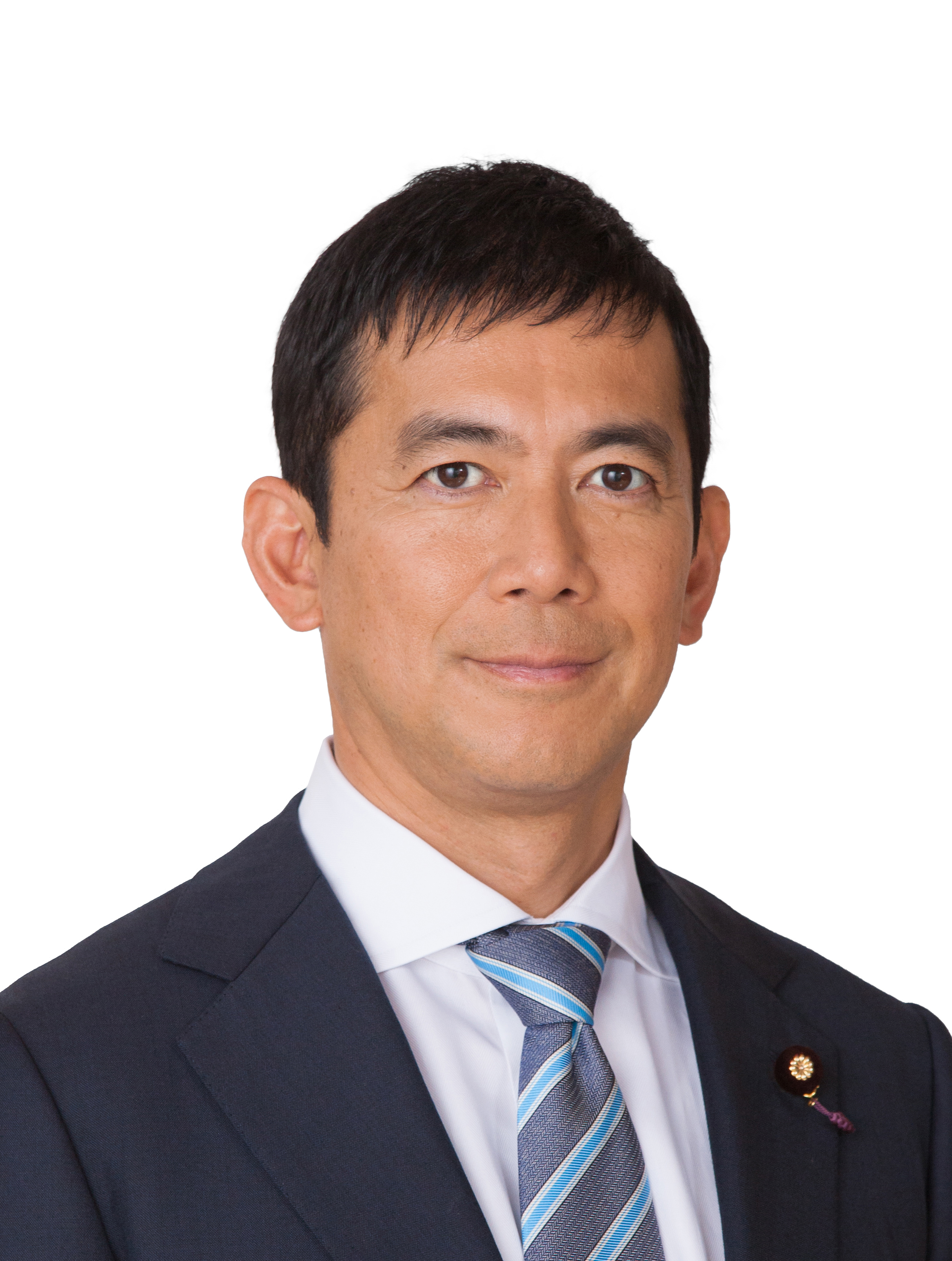
Nominee	Kenji Nakanishi	Taketo Kobayashi	Tadamasa Kisaki
Party	LDP	CDP	JCP
Popular vote	119,199	68,457	23,310
Percentage	52.54%	30.17%	10.27%
Japanese Representative before election
Vacant
Elected Japanese Representative
Kenji Nakanishi
LDP

Incumbent				Elected Member	
Member	Party	First elected	Status	Member	Party
Vacant (last held by Hachiro Okonogi)	– (LDP)	ー	LDP hold.	Kenji Nakanishi	LDP

== Kanagawa 4th district ==
2021 Kanagawa 4th district election
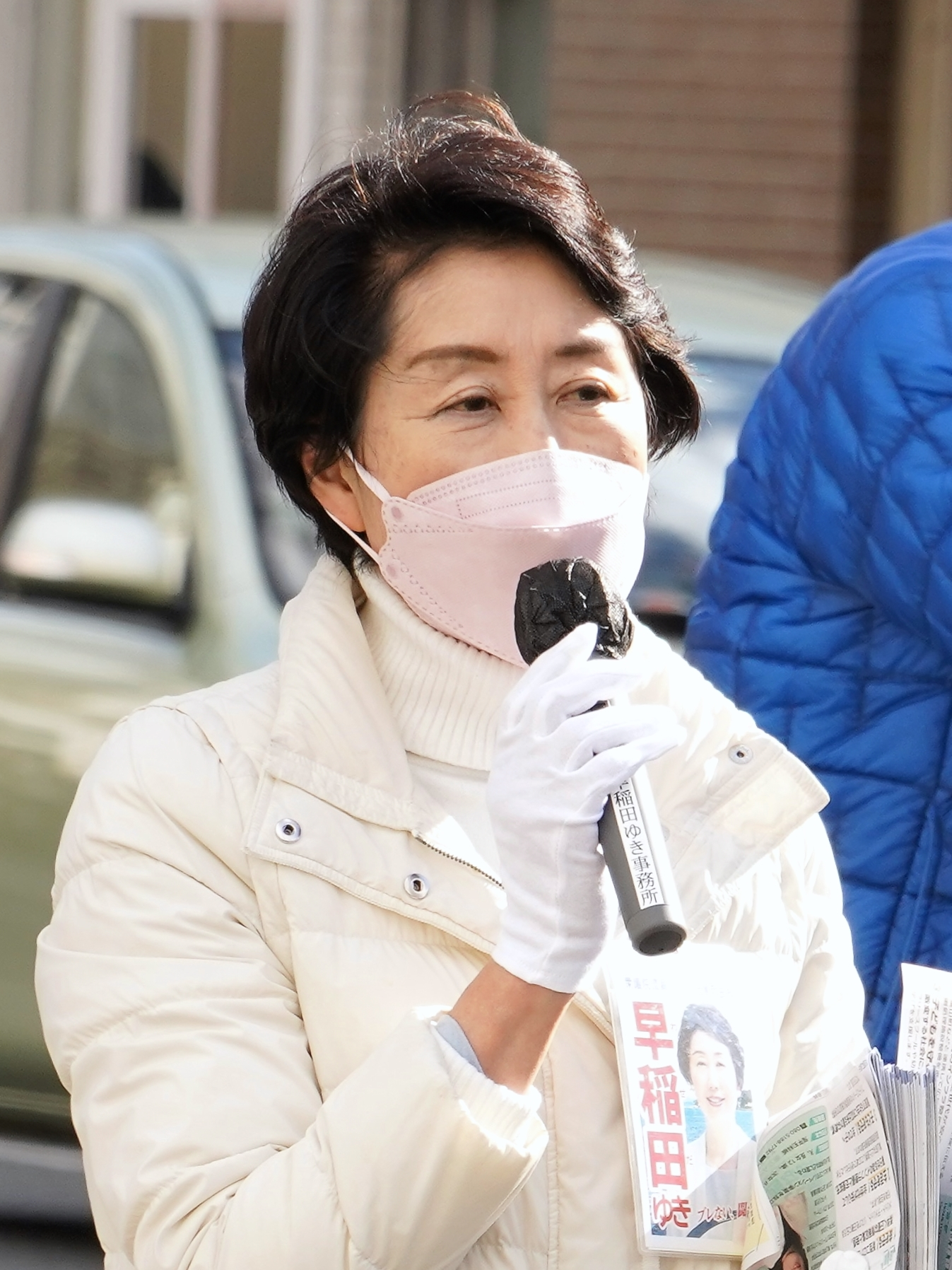

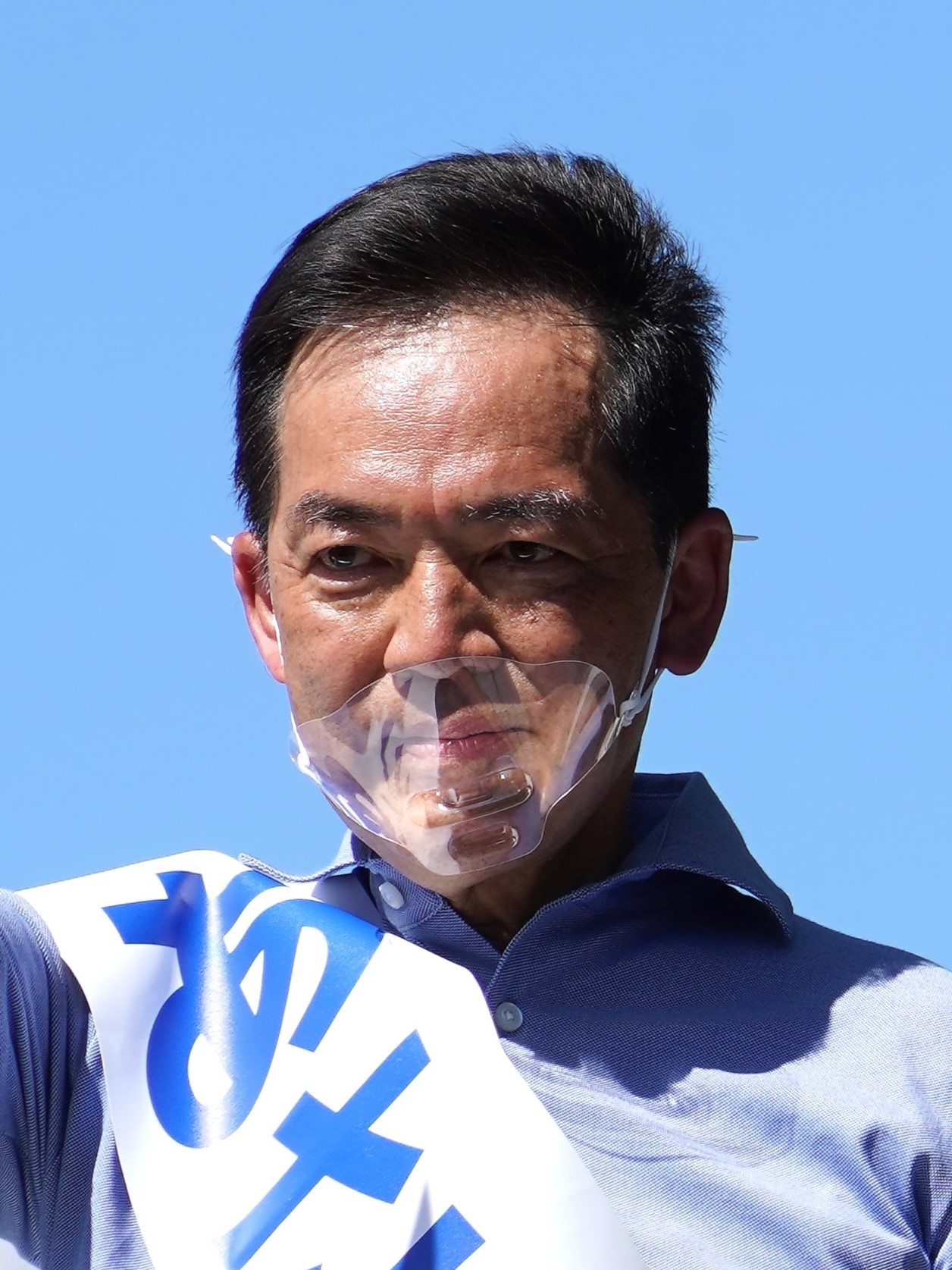

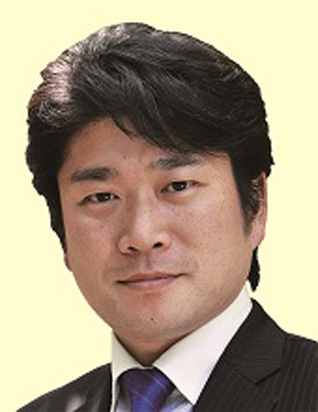
Nominee	Yuki Waseda	Keiichiro Asao	Tomohiro Yamamoto
Party	CDP	Independent	LDP
Popular vote	66,841	63,687	47,511
Percentage	33.03%	31.47%	23.48%
Japanese Representative before election
Yuki Waseda
CDP
Elected Japanese Representative
Yuki Waseda
CDP

Incumbent				Elected Member	
Member	Party	First elected	Status	Member	Party
Yuki Waseda	CDP	2017	Incumbent reelected.	Yuki Waseda	CDP

== Kanagawa 5th district ==
2021 Kanagawa 5th district election
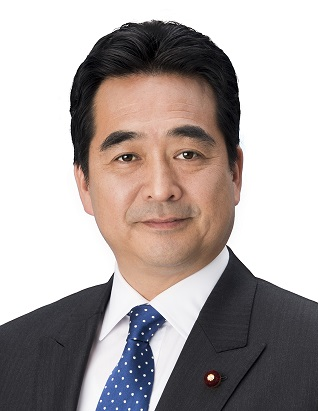
Nominee	Manabu Sakai	Makoto Yanazaki
Party	LDP	CDP
Popular vote	136,288	118,619
Percentage	53.47%	46.53%
Japanese Representative before election
Manabu Sakai
LDP
Elected Japanese Representative
Manabu Sakai
LDP

Incumbent				Elected Member	
Member	Party	First elected	Status	Member	Party
Manabu Sakai	LDP	2005	Incumbent reelected.	Manabu Sakai	LDP

== Kanagawa 6th district ==
2021 Kanagawa 6th district election
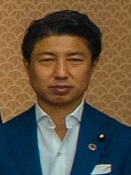

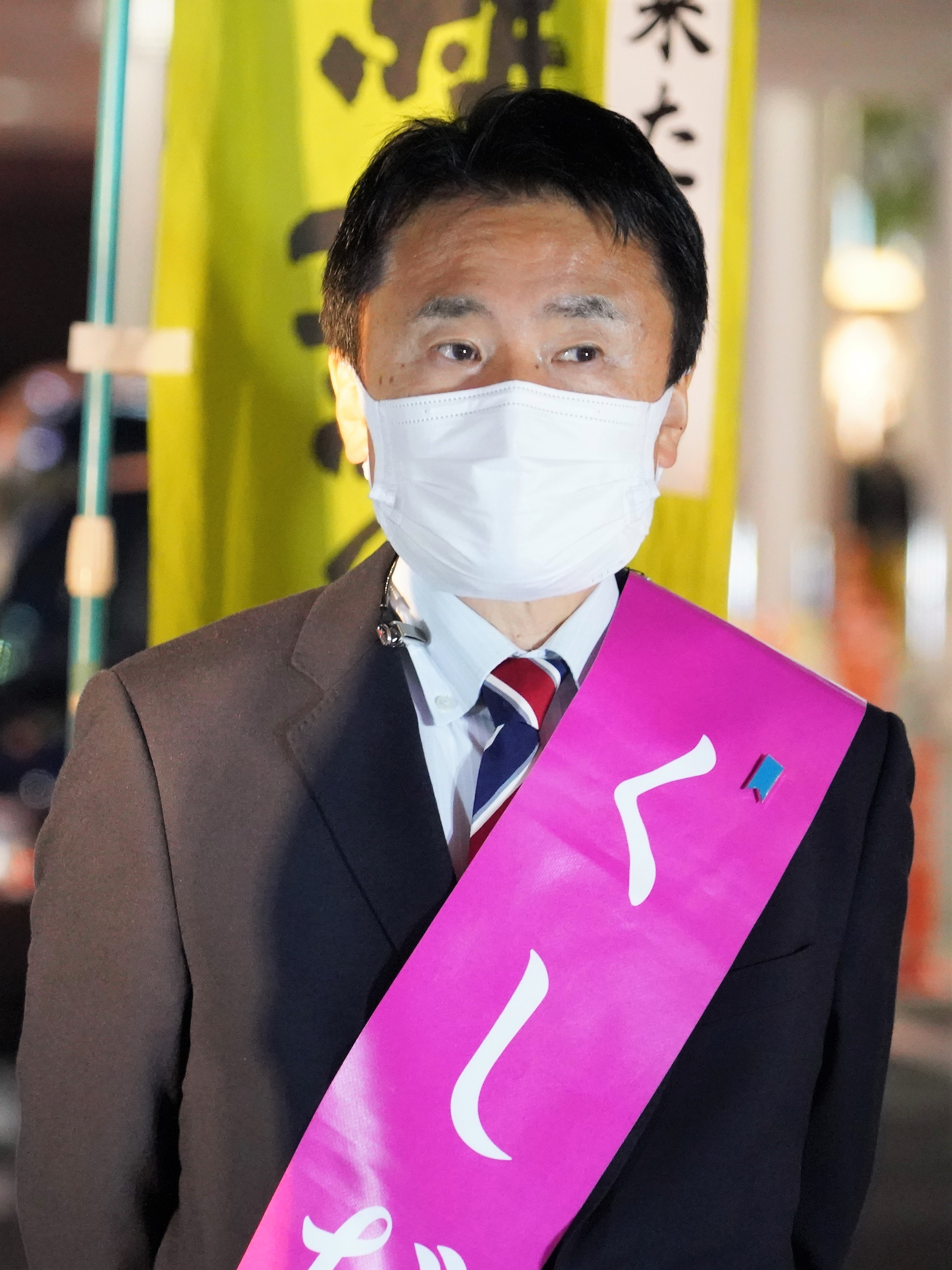
Nominee	Naoki Furukawa	Yoichiro Aoyagi	Seiichi Kushida
Party	LDP	CDP	Ishin
Popular vote	92,405	87,880	28,214
Percentage	44.32%	42.15%	13.53%
Japanese Representative before election
Yoichiro Aoyagi
CDP
Elected Japanese Representative
Naoki Furukawa
LDP

Incumbent				Elected Member	
Member	Party	First elected	Status	Member	Party
Yoichiro Aoyagi	CDP	2012	Incumbent defeated. (Won PR seat.)	Naoki Furukawa	LDP

== Kanagawa 7th district ==
2021 Kanagawa 7th district election
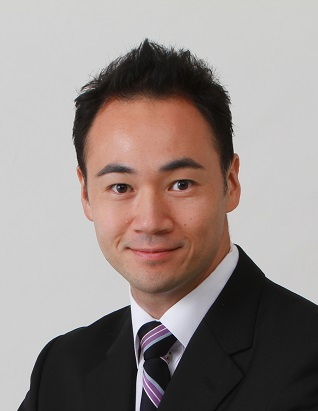
Nominee	Keisuke Suzuki	Kazuma Nakatani
Party	LDP	CDP
Popular vote	128,870	124,524
Percentage	50.86%	49.14%
Japanese Representative before election
Keisuke Suzuki
LDP
Elected Japanese Representative
Keisuke Suzuki
LDP

Incumbent				Elected Member	
Member	Party	First elected	Status	Member	Party
Keisuke Suzuki	LDP	2005	Incumbent reelected.	Keisuke Suzuki	LDP

== Kanagawa 8th district ==
2021 Kanagawa 8th district election
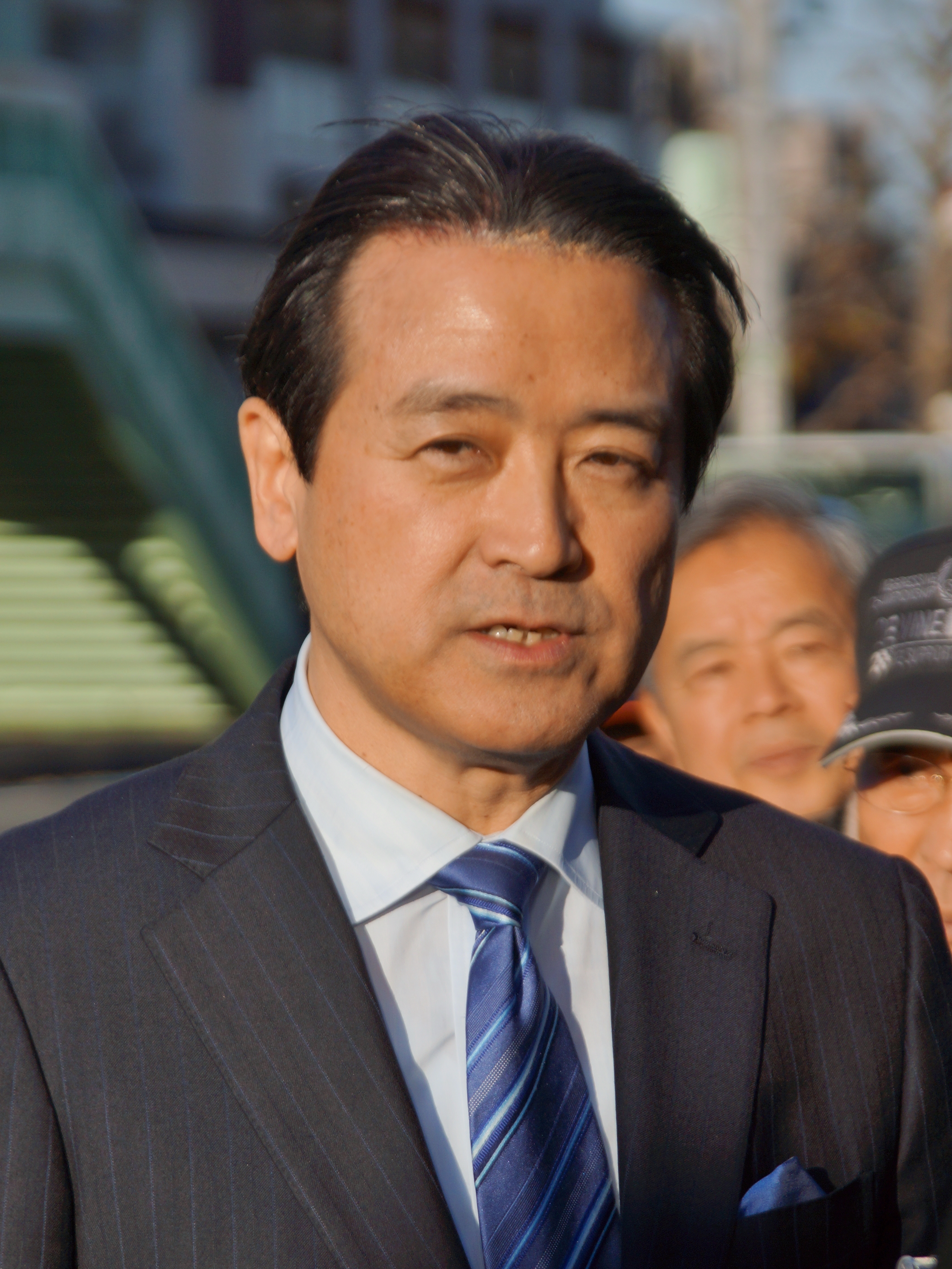

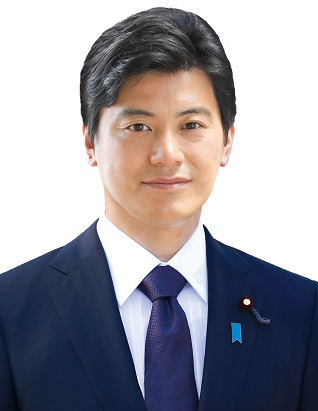
Nominee	Kenji Eda	Hidehiro Mitani
Party	CDP	LDP
Popular vote	130,925	117,963
Percentage	52.60%	47.40%
Japanese Representative before election
Kenji Eda
CDP
Elected Japanese Representative
Kenji Eda
CDP

Incumbent				Elected Member	
Member	Party	First elected	Status	Member	Party
Kenji Eda	CDP	2002 (by-el)	Incumbent reelected.	Kenji Eda	CDP
