= Hiroaki Kadoyama =

Japanese politician and lawyer

- 門山 宏哲
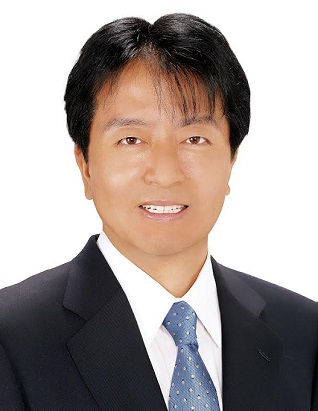

Member of the House of Representatives; from Southern Kanto
- Incumbent
- Assumed office 9 February 2026
- Preceded by: Kaname Tajima
- Constituency: Chiba 1st
- In office 17 December 2012 – 9 October 2024
- Constituency: PR block (2012–2017); Chiba 1st (2017–2021); PR block (2021–2024)

Personal details
- Born: 3 September 1964 (age 62) Yamaguchi Prefecture, Japan
- Party: Liberal Democratic
- Education: Chuo University
- Website: Hiroaki Kadoyama website

Hiroaki Kadoyama (門山 宏哲, Kadoyama Hiroaki; born 3 September 1964) is a Japanese politician of the Liberal Democratic Party, who serves as a member of the House of Representatives.

== Early years ==
In 1964, Kadoyama was born in Yamaguchi Prefecture. He then grew up in Chiba, Chiba Prefecture. After graduating from Chuo University's Faculty of Law, he took the bar examination and passed it in 1990. He completed legal training and registered as a lawyer.

After that, in 2001, he presided over the Kadoyama General Law Office and served as a full-time consultant for the Chiba City Specialized Consultation for Persons with Disabilities and president of the Chiba Junior Chamber.

== Political career ==
In the 2012 general election, Kadoyama ran for Chiba 1st district, and lost to DPJ's Kaname Tajima after a close race. Kadoyama won a seat in Southern Kanto PR.

In the 2014 general election, Kadoyama lost to DPJ's Tajima after a close race and won a seat in Southern Kanto PR.

In the 2017 general election, Kadoyama defeated Kibō’s Tajima after a close race and gain Chiba 1st's seat.

In 2018, Kadoyama was appointed to Parliamentary Secretary for Justice in the Fourth Abe First reshuffled cabinet.

In the 2020 LDP presidential election, Kadoyama endorsed Shigeru Ishiba as a recommender.

In the 2021 general election, Kadoyama was defeated by CDP’s Tajima and won a seat in Southern Kanto PR.

In 2022, Kadoyama was appointed to State Minister of Justice again in the Second Kishida First reshuffled cabinet.

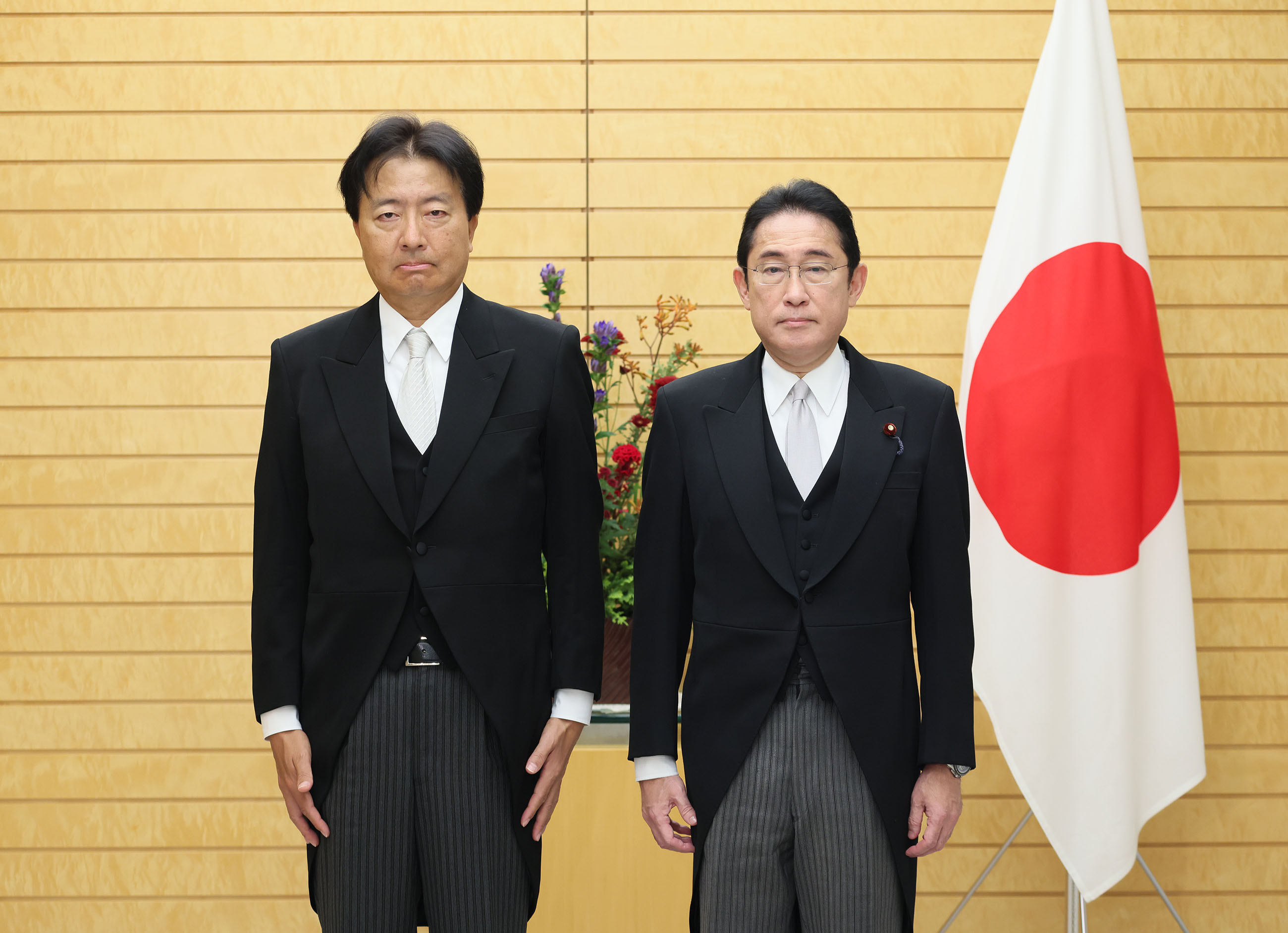
On 31 October, Kadoyama with PM Fumio Kishida

On 31 October 2023, Kadoyama was appointed to State Minister of Justice in the Second Kishida Second reshuffled cabinet because of Kadoyama's successor Mito Kakizawa's resignation for his bribery scandal.

In the 2024 LDP presidential election, Kadoyama endorsed Ishiba as a recommender again.

In the 2024 general election, Kadoyama was defeated by CDP's Tajima and lost re-election.

In the 2026 general election, Kadoyama defeated CRA’s Tajima and gain Chiba 1st's seat.
