= Chiba 6th district =

Electoral constituency in Chiba Prefecture, Japan

- Parliamentary constituency for the Japanese House of Representatives
- Numbered map of the Chiba Prefecture single seats
- Prefecture: Chiba
- Proportional District: Southern Kanto
- Electorate: 415,386

Current constituency
- Created: 1994
- Seats: One
- Party: LDP
- Representatives: Hiromichi Watanabe
- Municipalities: Matsudo.

Chiba 6th district (千葉県第6区, Chiba-ken dai-rokku or simply 千葉6区, Chiba-rokku) is a single-member constituency of the House of Representatives in the national Diet of Japan located in Chiba Prefecture.

== Areas covered ==
=== Since 2022 ===
- Matsudo

=== 2002 - 2022 ===
- Part of Ichikawa
- Part of Matsudo

=== 1994 - 2002 ===
- Part of Ichikawa
- Part of Matsudo
- Kamagaya

== List of representatives ==
Election	Representative	Party	Notes
1996	Hiromichi Watanabe	LDP	
2000	Yukio Ubukata	Democratic	
2003	Yukio Ubukata	Democratic	
2005	Hiromichi Watanabe	LDP	
2009	Yukio Ubukata	Democratic	
2012	Hiromichi Watanabe	LDP	
2014	Hiromichi Watanabe	LDP	
2017	Hiromichi Watanabe	LDP	
2021	Hiromichi Watanabe	LDP	
2024	Junko Ando	CDP	
2026	Hiromichi Watanabe	LDP	

== Election results ==
=== 2026 ===
2026
Party	Candidate	Votes	%	±%
LDP	Hiromichi Watanabe	89,662	40.5	▲6.7
Centrist Reform	Junko Andō	58,435	26.4	▼8.1
DPP	Yūdai Mutō	41,081	18.5	New
Sanseitō	Mikiko Dewa	21,693	9.8	▲1.7
JCP	Shin Urano	10,734	4.8	▼2.0
Majority		31,227	13.83	
Registered electors		413,387		
Turnout			54.59	▲2.9
LDP gain from Centrist Reform				

=== 2024 ===
2024
Party	Candidate	Votes	%	±%
CDP	Junko Ando	71,555	34.43	New
LDP	Hiromichi Watanabe (Incumbent)	70,215	33.78	▼8.70
Ishin	Kenta Fujimaki (Won PR seat)	30,472	14.66	▼11.02
Sanseitō	Shintaro Harada	16,752	8.06	New
JCP	Shin Urano	14,136	6.80	▼10.27
Social Democratic	Yoshiyasu Harada	4,705	2.27	New
Majority		1,340	0.65	
Registered electors		414,163		
Turnout			51.67	▼1.32
CDP gain from LDP				

=== 2021 ===
2021
Party	Candidate	Votes	%	±%
LDP	Hiromichi Watanabe (Incumbent)	80,764	42.48	▼1.02
Ishin	Kenta Fujimaki (Won PR seat)	48,829	25.68	▲19.90
JCP	Fumiko Asano	32,444	17.07	N/A
Independent	Yukio Ubukata	28,083	14.77	New
Majority		31,935	16.80	
Registered electors		369,609		
Turnout			52.99	▲3.38
LDP hold				

=== 2017 ===
2017
Party	Candidate	Votes	%	±%
LDP	Hiromichi Watanabe (Incumbent)	76,323	43.50	▼2.37
CDP	Yukio Ubukata (Won PR seat)	65,281	37.21	New
Kibō no Tō	Nobuhiko Endō	23,701	13.51	New
Ishin	Kentaro Hoshi	10,145	5.78	New
Majority		11,042	6.29	
Registered electors		363,440		
Turnout			49.61	▼0.02
LDP hold				

=== 2014 ===
2014
Party	Candidate	Votes	%	±%
LDP	Hiromichi Watanabe (Incumbent)	77,066	45.87	▲10.49
Democratic	Yukio Ubukata	50,323	29.95	▲6.43
JCP	Yoshimi Miwa	25,242	15.02	▲8.16
Future Generations	Nobuhiko Endō	15,395	9.16	New
Majority		26,743	15.92	
Registered electors		351,419		
Turnout			49.63	▼8.75
LDP hold				

=== 2012 ===
2012
Party	Candidate	Votes	%	±%
LDP	Hiromichi Watanabe	69,689	35.38	▲2.35
Democratic	Yukio Ubukata (Incumbent) (Won PR seat)	46,331	23.52	▼25.87
Restoration	Nobuhiko Endō	29,956	15.21	New
Your	Satoshi Ganno	24,350	12.36	▲5.49
JCP	Yoshimi Miwa	13,511	6.86	▲1.19
Tomorrow	Junko Shiraishi	13,139	6.67	New
Majority		23,358	11.86	
Registered electors		350,197		
Turnout			58.38	▼6.19
LDP gain from Democratic				

=== 2009 ===
2009
Party	Candidate	Votes	%	±%
Democratic	Yukio Ubukata	108,270	49.39	▲10.48
LDP	Hiromichi Watanabe (Incumbent)	72,401	33.03	▼19.90
Your	Yuki Kohira	15,063	6.87	New
JCP	Haruyuki Yamazaki	12,427	5.67	▼2.49
Independent	Kazumi Matsumoto	9,204	4.20	New
Happiness Realization	Kayoko Mishima	1,857	0.84	New
Majority		35,869	16.36	
Registered electors		348,266		
Turnout			64.57	▲0.41
Democratic gain from LDP				

=== 2005 ===
2005
Party	Candidate	Votes	%	±%
LDP	Hiromichi Watanabe	112,397	52.93	▲8.86
Democratic	Yukio Ubukata (Incumbent)	82,636	38.91	▼7.84
JCP	Taeko Takahashi	17,323	8.16	▼1.02
Majority		29,761	14.02	
Registered electors		338,338		
Turnout			64.16	▲8.68
LDP gain from Democratic				

=== 2003 ===
2003
Party	Candidate	Votes	%	±%
Democratic	Yukio Ubukata (Incumbent)	83,985	46.75	▲5.71
LDP	Hiromichi Watanabe (Won PR seat)	79,161	44.07	▲5.59
JCP	Taeko Takahashi	16,485	9.18	▼3.34
Majority		4,824	2.68	
Registered electors		335,416		
Turnout			55.48	▼1.71
Democratic hold				

=== 2000 ===
2000
Party	Candidate	Votes	%	±%
Democratic	Yukio Ubukata	78,359	41.04	New
LDP	Sadao Ioku	73,462	38.48	▼0.74
JCP	Hiroo Yuda	23,913	12.52	▼7.86
Liberal League	Yoshiyuki Shimamura	15,197	7.96	▲3.22
Majority		4,897	2.56	
Registered electors		348,139		
Turnout			57.19	
Democratic gain from LDP				

=== 1996 ===
1996
Party	Candidate	Votes	%	±%
LDP	Hiromichi Watanabe	60,801	39.22	New
Democratic	Yukio Ubukata (Won PR seat)	55,272	35.66	New
JCP	Makoto Nakajima	31,588	20.38	New
Liberal League	Sumiko Abe	7,352	4.74	New
Majority		5,529	3.56	
Registered electors				
Turnout				
LDP win (new seat)				
