= Chiba 1st district =

Electoral constituency in Chiba, Japan

Chiba 1st District
- Parliamentary constituency for the Japanese House of Representatives
- Numbered map of Chiba Prefecture single-member districts
- Prefecture: Chiba
- Proportional District: Southern Kanto
- Electorate: 433,793

Current constituency
- Created: 1994
- Seats: One
- Party: LDP
- Representative: Hiroaki Kadoyama
- Created from: Chiba 1st "medium-sized" district
- Municipalities: Chiba (Chūōku, Inage-ku, and Mihama-ku)

Chiba 1st district (千葉県第1区, Chiba-ken dai-ikku or simply 千葉1区, Chiba-ikku) is a single-member constituency of the House of Representatives in the national Diet of Japan located in the city of Chiba, Chiba Prefecture.

== List of representatives ==
Election	Representative	Party	Dates	Notes
1996	Hideo Usui	LDP	1996 – 2003	
2000	Hideo Usui	LDP	1996 – 2003	
2003	Kaname Tajima	DPJ	2003 – 2005	
2005	Hideo Usui	LDP	2005 – 2009	
2009	Kaname Tajima	DPJ	2009 – 2016	
2012	Kaname Tajima	DPJ	2009 – 2016	
2014	Kaname Tajima	DPJ	2009 – 2016	
2014	Kaname Tajima	DP	2016-2017	
2014	Kaname Tajima	Kibō	2017	
2017	Hiroaki Kadoyama	LDP	2017 – 2021	
2021	Kaname Tajima	CDP	2021–2026	
2024	Kaname Tajima	CDP	2021–2026	
2026	Hiroaki Kadoyama	LDP		

== Election results ==
2026
Party	Candidate	Votes	%	±%
LDP	Hiroaki Kadoyama	109,771	46.8	▲17.1
Centrist Reform	Kaname Tajima (elected in S. Kanto PR block)	91,149	38.9	▼8.4
Sanseitō	Atsuhiro Ueda	33,443	14.3	▲7.4
Registered electors		440,280		
Turnout			54.59	▲1.35
LDP gain from Centrist Reform				

2024
Party	Candidate	Votes	%	±%
CDP	Kaname Tajima (Incumbent)	107,439	47.33	▼8.94
Liberal Democratic (endorsed by Komeito	Hiroaki Kadoyama	67,432	29.70	▼14.03
Innovation	Kazutaka Yoda	23,770	10.47	new
Sanseitō	Atsuhiro Ueda	15,703	6.92	New
Communist	Masashi Watanabe	12,662	5.58	New
Majority		40,007	17.63	▲5.09
Registered electors		437,422		
Turnout		227,006	53.24	▼1.27
LDP hold				

2021
Party	Candidate	Votes	%	±%
CDP	Kaname Tajima (Incumbent-PR)	128,556	56.27	New
LDP	Hiroaki Kadoyama<ja> (Incumbent) (elected by PR)	99,895	43.73	▲3.04
Registered electors		430,513		
Turnout		228,451	54.51	▲4.82

2017
Party	Candidate	Votes	%	±%
LDP	Hiroaki Kadoyama (Incumbent-PR)	82,838	40.69	▲3.38
Kibō	Kaname Tajima (Incumbent) (elected by PR)	81,481	40.03	New
JCP	Takashi Ohno	24,231	11.90	▲3.08
Ishin	Yutaka Hasegawa<ja>	15,014	7.38	New
Registered electors		419,847		
Turnout		203,564	49.69	▼2.72

2014
Party	Candidate	Votes	%	±%
DPJ	Kaname Tajima (Incumbent)	84,755	41.10	▲7.90
LDP	Hiroaki Kadoyama (Incumbent-PR) (reelected by PR)	76,937	37.31	▲7.13
PFG	Takashi Tanuma<ja>	26,322	12.77	New
JCP	Tadayoshi Yoshida	18,182	8.82	▲3.17
Registered electors		404,904		
Turnout		206,196	52.41	▼6.80

2012
Party	Candidate	Votes	%	±%
DPJ	Kaname Tajima (Incumbent)	76,914	33.20	▼23.49
LDP	Hiroaki Kadoyama (elected by PR)	69,927	30.18	▼7.49
JRP	Takashi Tanuma (elected by PR)	44,668	19.28	New
YP	Motoki Nishino	27,089	11.69	New
JCP	Ken Terao	13,102	5.65	▲0.67
Registered electors		402,425		
Turnout		231,700	59.21	▼5.12

2009
Party	Candidate	Votes	%	±%
DPJ	Kaname Tajima (Incumbent-PR)	142,694	56.69	▲13.33
LDP	Shoichi Usui	94,820	37.67	▼13.44
JCP	Takeo Agui	12,540	4.98	▼0.55
HRP	Kazuyoshi Shina	1,644	0.65	New
Registered electors		397,382		
Turnout		251,698	64.33	▼0.56

2005
Party	Candidate	Votes	%	±%
LDP	Hideo Usui	124,292	51.11	▲7.25
DPJ	Kaname Tajima (Incumbent) (elected by PR)	105,459	43.36	▼5.85
JCP	Tomoki Sasaki	13,443	5.53	▼1.39
Registered electors		380,707		
Turnout		243,194	64.89	▲8.46

2003
Party	Candidate	Votes	%	±%
DPJ	Kaname Tajima	100,838	49.21	▲16.30
LDP	Hideo Usui (Incumbent)	89,873	43.86	▼0.94
JCP	Takeo Agui	14,183	6.92	▼9.19
Registered electors		373,444		
Turnout		204,894	56.43	▼1.88

2000
Party	Candidate	Votes	%	±%
LDP	Hideo Usui (Incumbent)	90,358	44.80	▲2.09
DPJ	Tetsuo Kitamura<ja> (Incumbent-PR)	66,378	32.91	New
JCP	Reiko Koshiba	32,492	16.11	▲2.03
LL	Miyuki Kimura	12,470	6.18	▲5.05
Registered electors		358,426		
Turnout			58.31	

1996
Party	Candidate	Votes	%	±%
LDP	Hideo Usui	77,679	42.71	New
NFP	Minoru Murai	40,094	22.04	New
DPJ	Naoko Kida	31,226	17.17	New
JCP	Hiroshi Nomura	25,612	14.08	New
NSP	Katsuo Hanzawa	5,206	2.86	New
LL	Hideyasu Murata	2,059	1.13	New
Turnout				
