= Hiromichi Watanabe =

Japanese politician (born 1950)

- 渡辺 博道
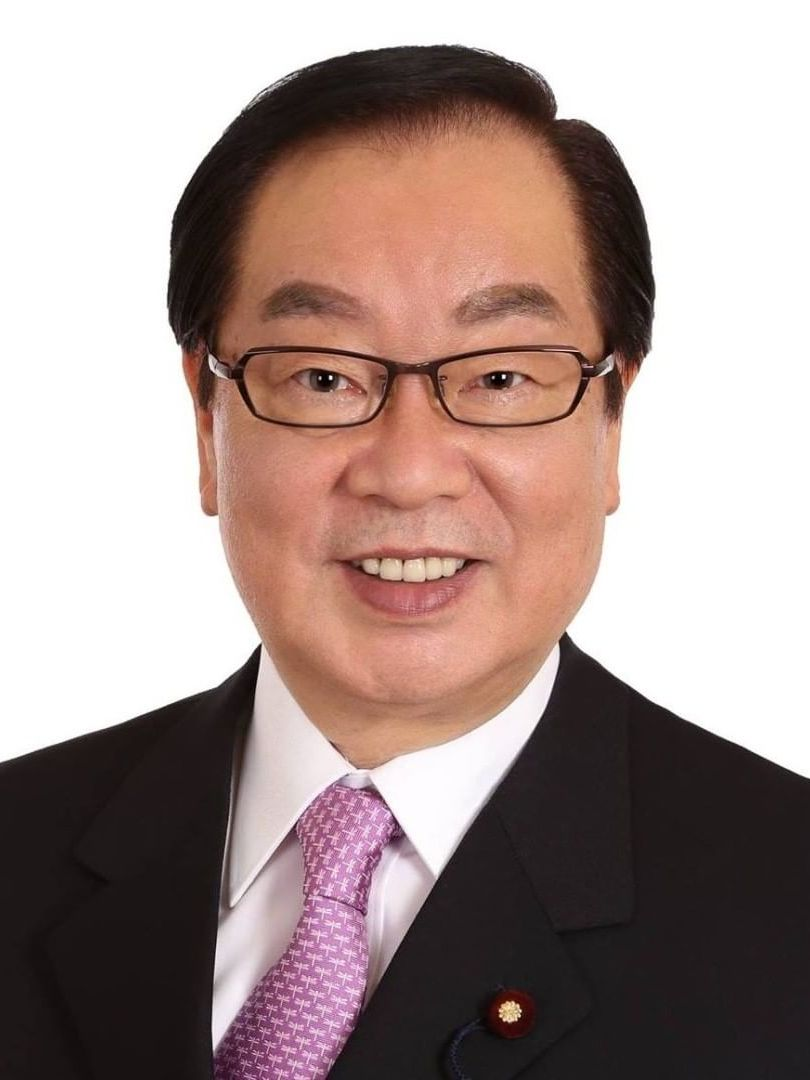
- Official portrait, 2022

Minister of Reconstruction
- In office 27 December 2022 – 13 September 2023
- Prime Minister: Fumio Kishida
- Preceded by: Kenya Akiba
- Succeeded by: Shinako Tsuchiya
- In office 2 October 2018 – 11 September 2019
- Prime Minister: Shinzo Abe
- Preceded by: Masayoshi Yoshino
- Succeeded by: Kazunori Tanaka

Member of the House of Representatives; from Southern Kanto
- Incumbent
- Assumed office 10 February 2026
- Preceded by: Junko Andō
- Constituency: Chiba 6th
- In office 16 December 2012 – 9 October 2024
- Preceded by: Yukio Ubukata
- Succeeded by: Junko Andō
- Constituency: Chiba 6th
- In office 20 October 1996 – 21 July 2009
- Preceded by: Constituency established
- Succeeded by: Yukio Ubukata
- Constituency: Chiba 6th (1996–2000); PR block (2000–2005); Chiba 6th (2005–2009)

Member of the Chiba Prefectural Assembly
- In office 1995–1996
- Constituency: Matsudo City

Personal details
- Born: 3 August 1950 (age 76) Matsudo, Chiba, Japan
- Party: Liberal Democratic
- Education: Waseda University

Hiromichi Watanabe (渡辺 博道, Watanabe Hiromichi; born 3 August 1950) is a Japanese politician of the Liberal Democratic Party and a member of the House of Representatives in the Diet of Japan. A native of Matsudo City, Chiba he attended Waseda University as an undergraduate and received a master's degree from Meiji University. He was elected to the Chiba Prefectural Assembly in 1995 (serving for one term) and then to the House of Representatives for the first time in 1996. He was appointed by Shinzo Abe as Minister of Reconstruction on 2 October 2018 and left the position on 11 September 2019. He was succeeded by Kazunori Tanaka.

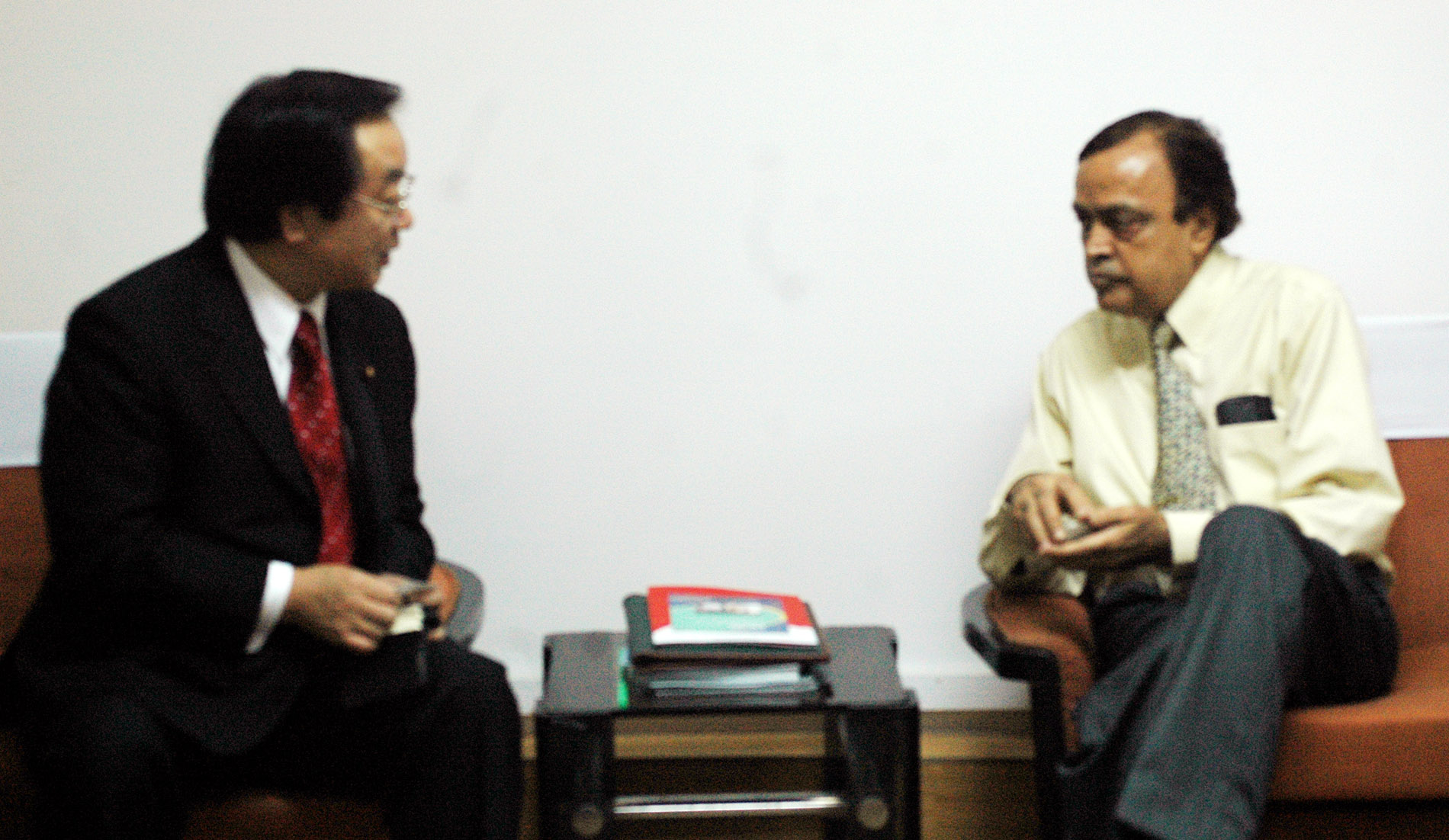
The Union Minister of Petroleum & Natural Gas Shri Murli Deora meeting with the Senior Vice Minister of Economy, Trade & Industry, Japan, Mr. Hiromichi Watanabe, in New Delhi on December 6, 2006.

== Remarks ==
- Yoshitaka Sakurada is Watanabe's old friend.
- Yoshio Mochizuki is similar to Watanabe.
