= Nobuhiko Endō =

Japanese politician

- 遠藤 宣彦

Member of the House of Representatives
- In office 30 August 2005 – 21 July 2009
- Constituency: Kyushu PR

Personal details
- Born: 5 June 1963 (age 63) Meguro, Tokyo, Japan
- Party: Independent
- Other political affiliations: LP (2000–2003); LDP (2005–2009); Sunrise (2012); JRP (2012–2014); PFG (2014–2015); KnT (2017)
- Education: University of Tokyo

Nobuhiko Endō (遠藤 宣彦, Endō Nobuhiko; born 5 June 1963) is a Japanese politician of the Liberal Democratic Party, a member of the House of Representatives in the Diet (national legislature). A native of Meguro, Tokyo and graduate of the University of Tokyo, he worked at the Ministry of Posts and Telecommunications, attending a university in Australia. After unsuccessful runs in 2000 and 2001, he was elected to the House of Representatives for the first time in 2005.

== See also ==
- Koizumi Children
