= Kaname Tajima =

Japanese politician

- 田嶋 要
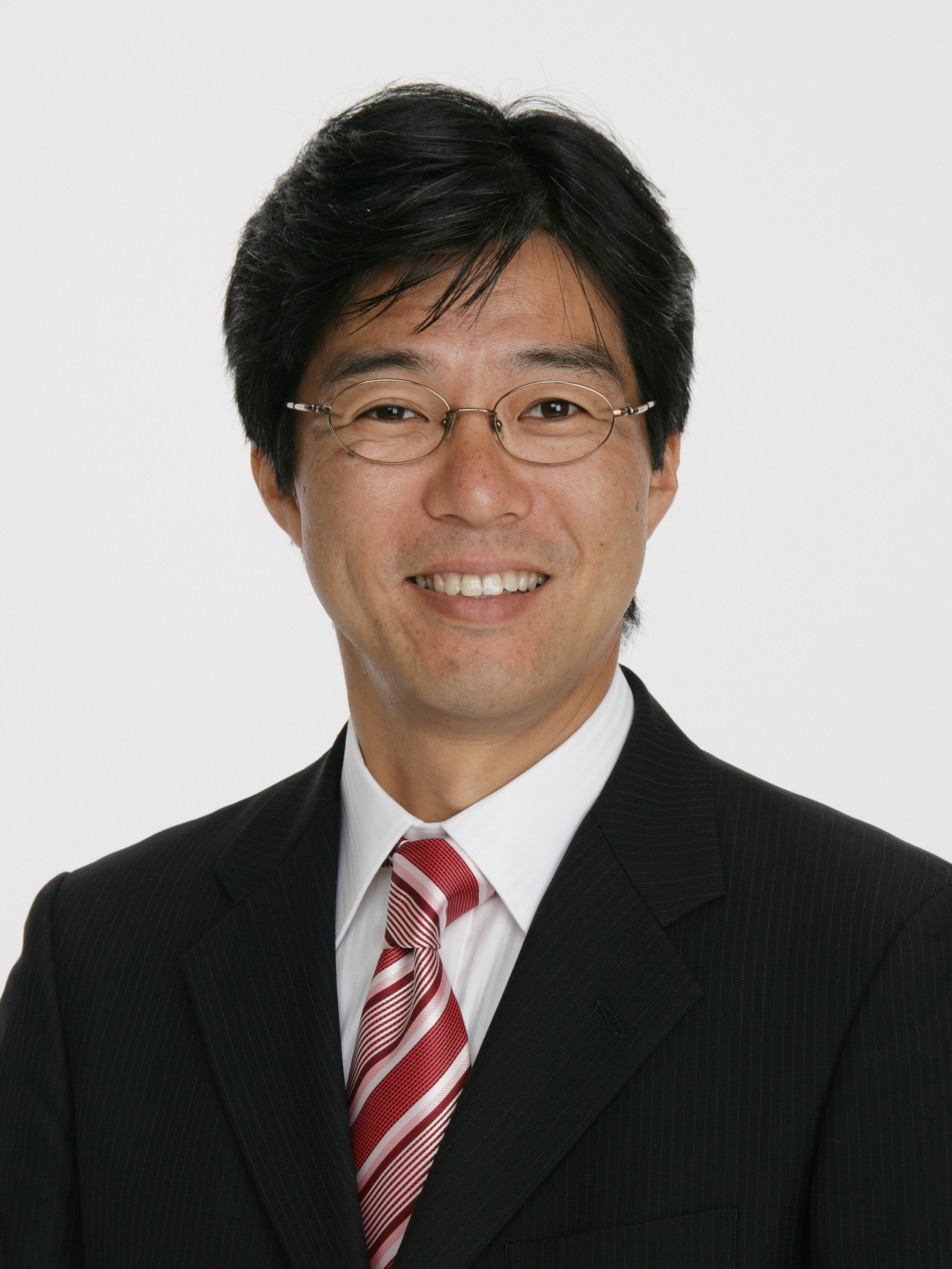
- Official portrait, 2008

Member of the House of Representatives; from Southern Kanto
- Incumbent
- Assumed office 9 November 2003
- Preceded by: Hideo Usui
- Constituency: See list: Chiba 1st (2003–2005); PR block (2005–2009); Chiba 1st (2009–2017); PR block (2017–2021); Chiba 1st (2021–2026); PR block (2026–present)

Personal details
- Born: 22 September 1961 (age 65) Nagoya, Aichi, Japan
- Party: DRP (since 2026)
- Other political affiliations: DPJ (2003–2016); DP (2016–2017); KnT (2017–2018); Independent (2018–2020); CDP (2020–2026); CRA (2026)
- Education: University of Tokyo; University of Pennsylvania

Kaname Tajima (田嶋 要, Tajima Kaname; born 22 September 1961) is a Japanese politician serving in the House of Representatives in the Diet (national legislature) as a member of the Constitutional Democratic Party of Japan. A native of Nagoya, Aichi he attended the University of Tokyo and also earned MBA from the Wharton School of the University of Pennsylvania. He was elected for the first time in 2003 after working at NTT for 20 years.

Tajima is part of the CDP's shadow cabinet 'Next Cabinet' as the shadow Minister of Economy, Trade and Industry.

Political offices
Preceded by Yōsuke Kondō, Chiaki Takahashi	Parliamentary Secretary for Economy, Trade and Industry; 2010–2011; Served alongside: Yoshikatsu Nakayama	Succeeded by Keiro Kitagami, Mitsuyoshi Yanagisawa
