= Tokyo's Diet electoral districts =

Tokyo's House of Representatives districts since 2017

All seats

Central Tokyo seats

Tokyo currently sends 60 elected members to the Diet of Japan, 49 to the House of Representatives and 11 to the House of Councillors.

== House of Representatives ==
The current House of Representatives Tokyo delegation consists of 49 representatives in total. The parties that these members belong to is - 33 LDP, 5 CRA, 4 Mirai, 3 DPP, 2 Sanseitō, 1 JCP, and, 1 Ishin.

These delegates are made up of 30 members elected in district seats, and 19 members elected via the proportional representation method.

=== Constituency seats ===
District	Representative	Party	Incumbency
1st	Miki Yamada	LDP	9 February 2026 – present
2nd	Kiyoto Tsuji	LDP	17 December 2012 – present
3rd	Hirotaka Ishihara	LDP	17 December 2012 – present
4th	Masaaki Taira	LDP	12 September 2005 – present
5th	Kenji Wakamiya	LDP	9 February 2026 – present
6th	Shōgo Azemoto	LDP	9 February 2026 – present
7th	Tamayo Marukawa	LDP	9 February 2026 – present
8th	Hiroko Kado	LDP	9 February 2026 – present
9th	Isshu Sugawara	LDP	9 February 2026 – present
10th	Hayato Suzuki	LDP	15 December 2014 – present
11th	Hakubun Shimomura	LDP	9 February 2026 – present
12th	Kei Takagi	LDP	23 October 2017 – present
13th	Shin Tsuchida	LDP	1 November 2021 – present
14th	Midori Matsushima	LDP	17 December 2012 – present
15th	Kōki Ōzora	LDP	28 October 2024 – present
16th	Yohei Onishi	LDP	28 October 2024 – present
17th	Katsuei Hirasawa	LDP	21 October 1996 – present
18th	Kaoru Fukuda	LDP	28 October 2024 – present
19th	Yohei Matsumoto	LDP	31 October 2021 – present
20th	Seiji Kihara	LDP	17 December 2012 – present
21st	Kiyoshi Odawara	LDP	9 February 2026 – present
22nd	Tatsuya Ito	LDP	17 December 2012 – present
23rd	Shinichiro Kawamatsu	LDP	9 February 2026 – present
24th	Kōichi Hagiuda	LDP	17 December 2012 – present
25th	Shinji Inoue	LDP	10 November 2003 – present
26th	Ueki Imaoka	LDP	9 February 2026 – present
27th	Yūichi Kurosaki	LDP	9 February 2026 – present
28th	Takao Andō	LDP	28 October 2024 – present
29th	Kōsuke Nagasawa	LDP	9 February 2026 – present
30th	Akihisa Nagashima	LDP	10 November 2003 – present

=== PR seats ===
Alongside Hokkaido, Tokyo is the only other prefecture-level division with its own proportional representation block. The PR block consists of 19 members.

Party	Representative	District contested	Incumbency
LDP	Masashi Tanaka	None	9 February 2026 – present
LDP	Yūko Tsuji	None	9 February 2026 – present
LDP	Kiyoko Morihara	None	9 February 2026 – present
CRA	Mitsunari Okamoto	None	17 December 2012 – present
CRA	Koichi Kasai	None	1 November 2021 – present
CRA	Eriko Ōmori	None	28 October 2024 – present
CRA	Akira Nagatsuma	Tokyo 27th	26 June 2000 – present
CRA	Takayuki Ochiai	Tokyo 6th	15 December 2014 – present
Mirai	Satoshi Takayama	None	9 February 2026 – present
Mirai	Yūya Mineshima	Tokyo 7th	9 February 2026 – present
Mirai	Noboru Usami	Tokyo 26th	9 February 2026 – present
Mirai	Akihiro Dobashi	Tokyo 2nd	9 February 2026 – present
DPP	Yosuke Mori	Tokyo 13th	28 October 2024 – present
DPP	Kazumoto Takazawa	Tokyo 11th	9 February 2026 – present
DPP	Masae Ido	Tokyo 4th	9 February 2026 – present
Sanseitō	Rina Yoshikawa	Tokyo 1st	28 October 2024 – present
Sanseitō	Mika Suzuki	Tokyo 22nd	9 February 2026 – present
JCP	Tomoko Tamura	None	28 October 2024 – present
Ishin	Tsukasa Abe	Tokyo 12th	1 November 2021 – present

== House of Councillors ==
The current House of Councillors Tokyo delegation consists of 3 LDP, 2 DPP, 2 JCP, 2 Komeito, 1 CDP, 1 Sanseitō. The members are elected from the Tokyo at-large district.

Class	#	Councillors	Party	Term ends	Incumbency
2022	1	Kentaro Asahi	LDP	25 July 2028	26 July 2016 – present
2022	2	Toshiko Takeya	Komeito	25 July 2028	26 July 2010 – present
2022	3	Taku Yamazoe	JCP	25 July 2028	26 July 2016 – present
2022	4	Ayaka Shiomura	CDP	25 July 2028	29 July 2019 – present
2022	5	Akiko Ikuina	LDP	25 July 2028	26 July 2022 – present
2022	6	Vacant			
2025	1	Daichi Suzuki	LDP	28 July 2031	29 July 2025 – present
2025	2	Saya	Sanseitō	28 July 2031	29 July 2025 – present
2025	3	Mayu Ushida	DPP	28 July 2031	29 July 2025 – present
2025	4	Yudai Kawamura	Komeito	28 July 2031	29 July 2025 – present
2025	5	Yoshihiro Okumura	DPP	28 July 2031	29 July 2025 – present
2025	6	Yoshiko Kira	JCP	28 July 2031	29 July 2013 – present
