= 2026 Japanese general election in Tokyo =

- 8 February 2026

All 49 seats to the House of Representatives
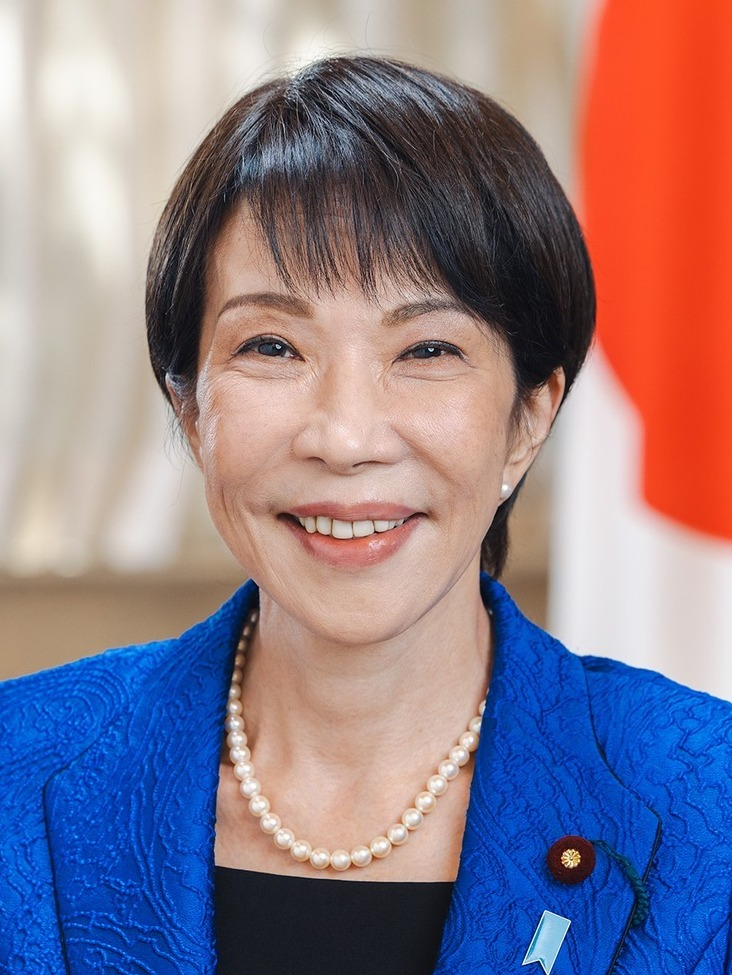

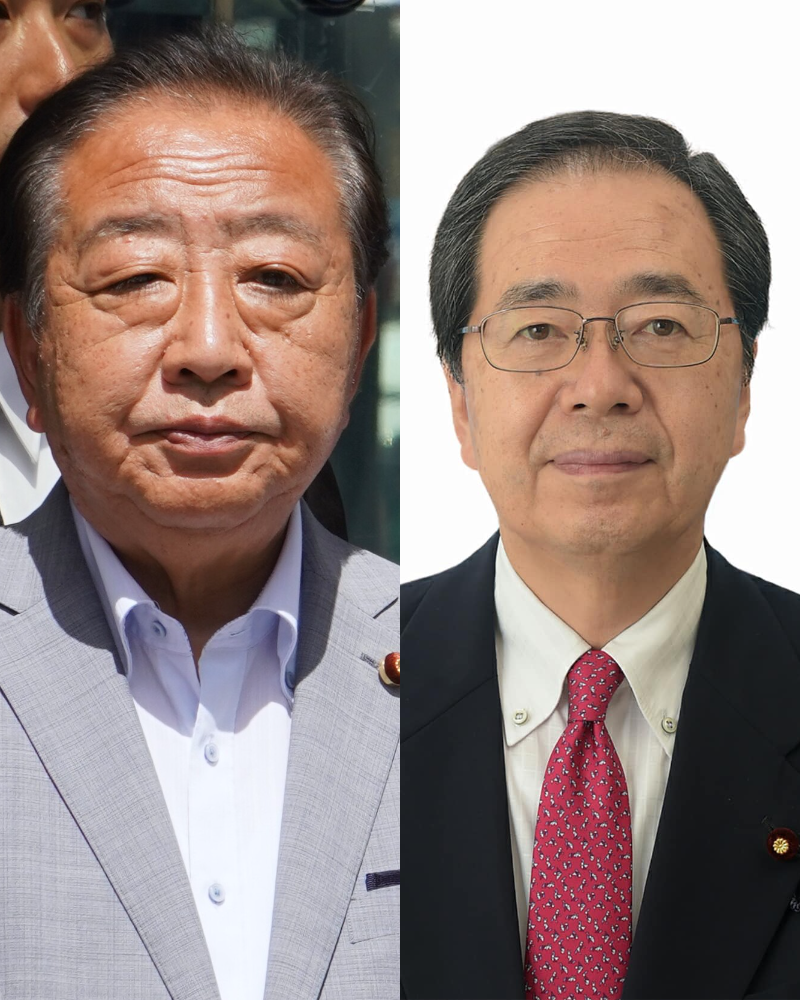

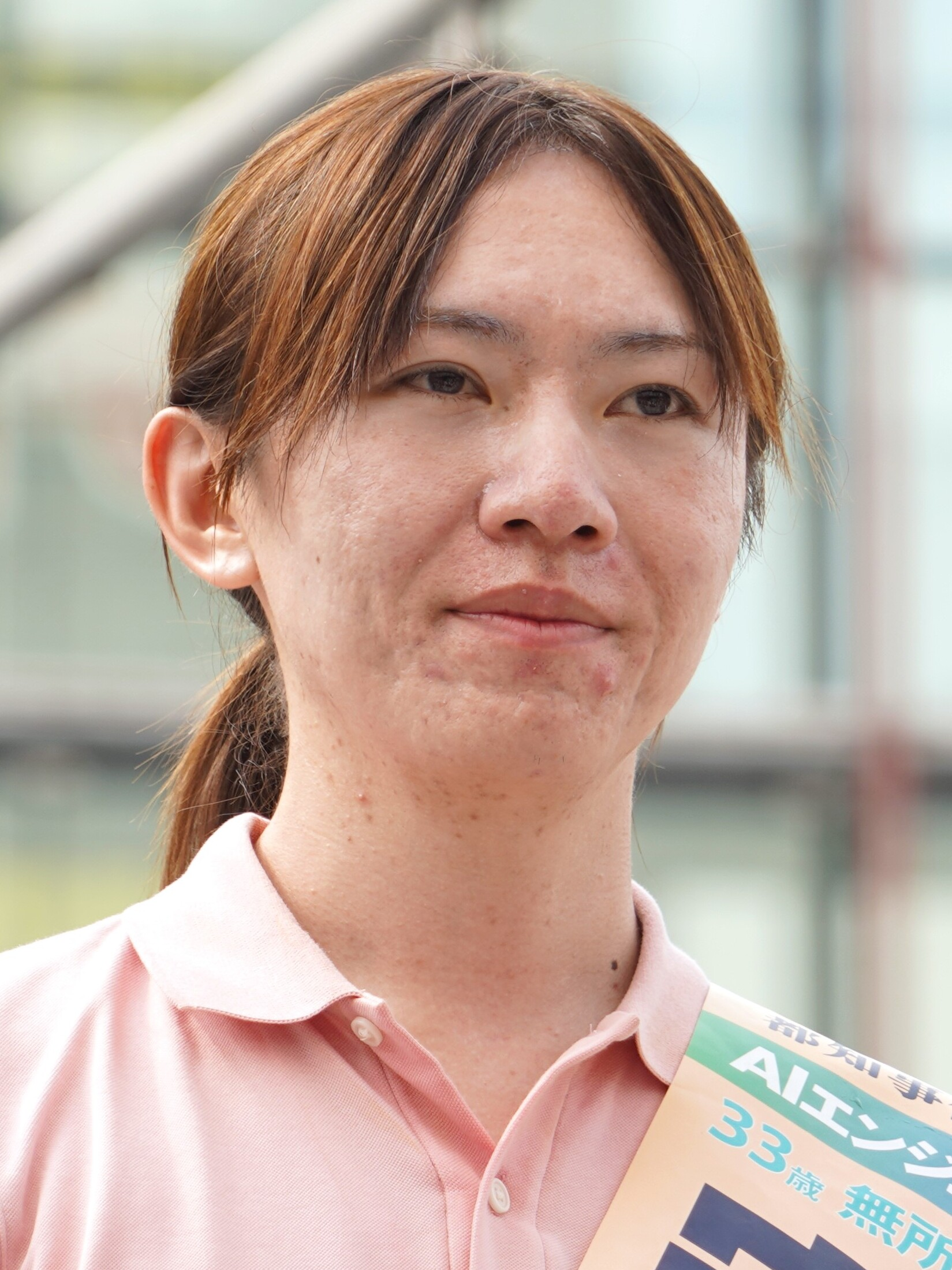

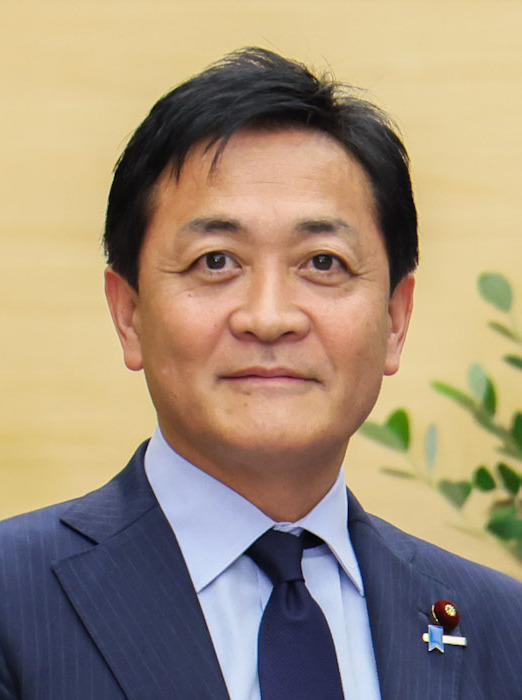

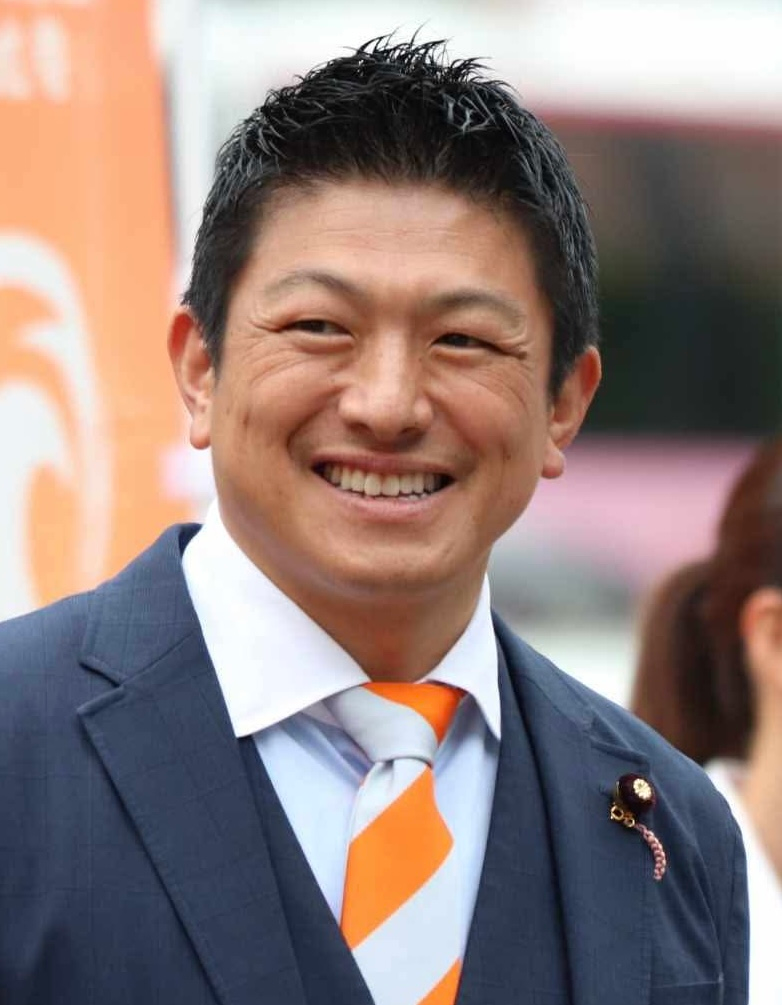

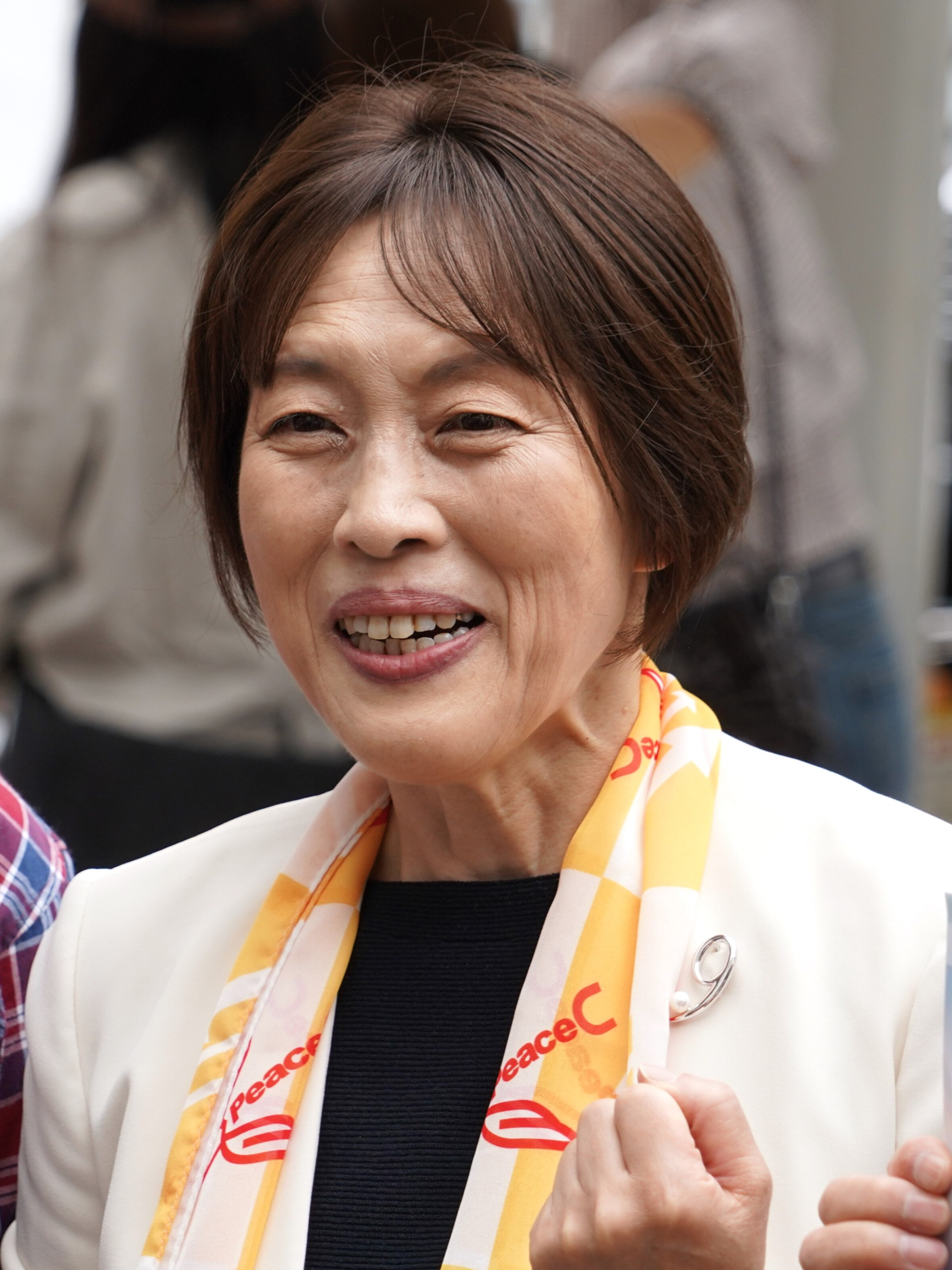

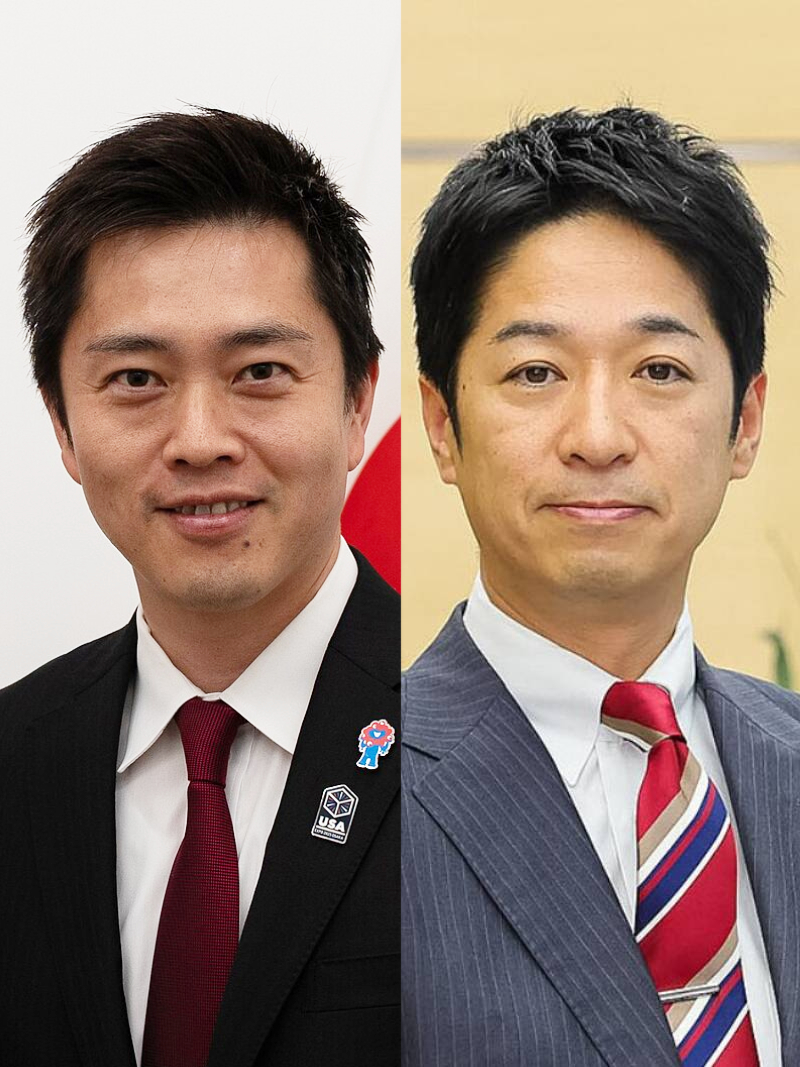
	Majority party	Minority party	Third party
Party	LDP	Centrist Reform	Team Mirai
Last election	16 seats	23 seats (Note: As CDP and Komeito)	Did not exist
Constituency	30	0	0
Constituency vote	2,850,532; 42.77%	1,475,053; 22.13%	103,059; 1.55%
PR seats	3	5	4
Regional vote	2,243,625; 33.10%	1,119,155; 16.51%	887,849; 13.10%
Total	33	5	4
Seat change	▲17	▼18	New
	Fourth party	Fifth party	Sixth party
Party	DPP	Sanseitō	JCP
Last election	3 seats	0 seats	1 seats
Constituency	0	0	0
Constituency vote	950,908; 14.27%	580,776; 8.71%	261,080; 3.92%
PR seats	3	2	1
Regional vote	746,660; 11.02%	427,028; 6.30%	407,146; 6.01%
Total	3	2	1
Seat change	0	▲2	0
	Seventh party
Party	Ishin
Last election	2 seats
Constituency	0
Constituency vote	251,136; 3.77%
PR seats	1
Regional vote	384,496; 5.67%
Total	1
Seat change	▼1

This page contains the detailed results for the 2026 Japanese general election in the Tokyo proportional representation block.

The Tokyo block covers the city of Tokyo and elects 19 members by party-list proportional representation. In addition to the block seats, Tokyo has 30 constituencies each electing a single member by first-past-the-post voting.

== Overall results ==
The Liberal Democratic Party won all thirty single-member constituencies in Toyko for the first time. As a result of their landslide victory, the LDP's list of candidates for proportional representation was exhausted, resulting in five seats being awarded to other parties (two to the CRA and one each to Team Mirai, the DPFP, and Sanseito).

Party	Constituency			Proportional			Total seats
Party	Votes	%	Seats	Votes	%	Seats	Total seats
Liberal Democratic Party	2,850,532	42.77	30	2,243,625	33.10	3	33
Centrist Reform Alliance	1,475,053	22.13	0	1,119,155	16.51	5	5
Team Mirai	103,059	1.55	0	887,849	13.10	4	4
Democratic Party For the People	950,908	14.27	0	746,660	11.02	3	3
Sanseito	580,776	8.71	0	427,028	6.30	2	2
Japanese Communist Party	261,080	3.92	0	407,146	6.01	1	1
Nippon Ishin no Kai	251,136	3.77	0	384,496	5.67	1	1
Conservative Party of Japan	22,211	0.33	0	209,329	3.09	0	0
Reiwa Shinsengumi	32,066	0.48	0	179,614	2.65	0	0
Tax Cuts Japan and Yukoku Alliance	13,450	0.20	0	89,161	1.32	0	0
Social Democratic Party				84,362	1.24	0	0
Independents	103,767	1.56	0				0
Others	20,586	0.31	0				0
Total	6,664,624	100.00	30	6,778,425	100.00	19	49
Invalid/blank votes	176,049	2.57		61,808	0.90		
Voter turnout	6,840,675	59.15		6,840,224	59.15		
Registered voters	11,563,998			11,563,998			

== Single-member constituencies ==
Single-member constituency results in Tokyo
Constituency	Previous member		Elected member		Votes	%	Margin	Status
Tokyo 1st	Banri Kaieda	CRA	Miki Yamada	LDP	82,622	43.0	33,792	LDP gain from CRA
Tokyo 2nd	Kiyoto Tsuji	LDP	Kiyoto Tsuji	LDP	84,690	43.3	48,669	LDP hold
Tokyo 3rd	Hirotaka Ishihara	LDP	Hirotaka Ishihara	LDP	93,158	42.6	39,574	LDP hold
Tokyo 4th	Masaaki Taira	LDP	Masaaki Taira	LDP	114,054	49.4	58,444	LDP hold
Tokyo 5th	Yoshio Tezuka	CRA	Yoshio Tezuka	LDP	89,078	39.1	30,914	LDP gain from CRA
Tokyo 6th	Takayuki Ochiai	CRA	Shōgo Azemoto	LDP	90,077	37.7	10,815	LDP gain from CRA
Tokyo 7th	Akihiro Matsuo	CRA	Tamayo Marukawa	LDP	80,421	34.5	27,845	LDP gain from CRA
Tokyo 8th	Harumi Yoshida	CRA	Hiroko Kado	LDP	108,020	44.3	30,400	LDP gain from CRA
Tokyo 9th	Issei Yamagishi	CRA	Isshu Sugawara	LDP	78,927	43.0	22,752	LDP gain from CRA
Tokyo 10th	Hayato Suzuki	LDP	Hayato Suzuki	LDP	126,044	49.1	58,469	LDP hold
Tokyo 11th	Yukihiko Akutsu	CRA	Hakubun Shimomura	LDP	69,077	31.5	16,076	LDP gain from CRA
Tokyo 12th	Kei Takagi	LDP	Kei Takagi	LDP	78,774	35.0	34,640	LDP hold
Tokyo 13th	Shin Tsuchida	LDP	Shin Tsuchida	LDP	94,680	46.6	28,540	LDP hold
Tokyo 14th	Midori Matsushima	LDP	Midori Matsushima	LDP	109,892	50.2	60,580	LDP hold
Tokyo 15th	Natsumi Sakai	CRA	Kōki Ōzora	LDP	109,489	42.5	38,578	LDP gain from CRA
Tokyo 16th	Yohei Onishi	LDP	Yohei Onishi	LDP	92,858	44.6	41,331	LDP hold
Tokyo 17th	Katsuei Hirasawa	LDP	Katsuei Hirasawa	LDP	73,234	36.2	28,640	LDP hold
Tokyo 18th	Kaoru Fukuda	LDP	Kaoru Fukuda	LDP	117,383	47.7	47,661	LDP hold
Tokyo 19th	Yoshinori Suematsu	CRA	Yohei Matsumoto	LDP	93,697	45.9	39,352	LDP gain from CRA
Tokyo 20th	Seiji Kihara	LDP	Seiji Kihara	LDP	108,985	48.6	62,075	LDP hold
Tokyo 21st	Masako Ōkawara	CRA	Kiyoshi Odawara	LDP	97,494	42.6	31,781	LDP gain from CRA
Tokyo 22nd	Ikuo Yamahana	CRA	Tatsuya Ito	LDP	132,689	51.5	45,195	LDP gain from CRA
Tokyo 23rd	Shunsuke Ito	CRA	Shinichiro Kawamatsu	LDP	92,171	45.3	22,263	LDP gain from CRA
Tokyo 24th	Kōichi Hagiuda	LDP	Kōichi Hagiuda	LDP	85,806	41.1	15,025	LDP hold
Tokyo 25th	Shinji Inoue	LDP	Shinji Inoue	LDP	109,606	50.5	59,387	LDP hold
Tokyo 26th	Jin Matsubara	Ind.	Ueki Imaoka	LDP	92,329	34.7	10,210	LDP gain from Ind.
Tokyo 27th	Akira Nagatsuma	CRA	Yuichi Kurosaki	LDP	85,249	38.1	4,252	LDP gain from CRA
Tokyo 28th	Satoshi Takamatsu	CRA	Takao Ando	LDP	69,037	36.6	27,555	LDP gain from CRA
Tokyo 29th	Mitsunari Okamoto	CRA	Kosuke Nagasawa	LDP	80,538	41.4	35,180	LDP gain from CRA
Tokyo 30th	Eri Igarashi	CRA	Akihisa Nagashima	LDP	110,453	45.2	29,371	LDP gain from CRA

Tokyo 1st district
Party	Candidate	Constituency		Proportional	
Party	Candidate	Votes	%	Votes	%
Liberal Democratic Party	Miki Yamada	82,622	43.00	64,209	33.01
Team Mirai				30,360	15.61
Centrist Reform Alliance	Banri Kaieda	48,830	25.41	29,593	15.21
Democratic Party For the People				18,747	9.64
Sanseito	Rina Yoshikawa	25,232	13.13	11,894	6.12
Nippon Ishin no Kai	Asuka Haruyama	20,187	10.50	11,222	5.77
Japanese Communist Party	Asahi Kuroda	15,295	7.96	12,048	6.19
Conservative Party of Japan				6,862	3.53
Reiwa Shinsengumi				4,458	2.29
Tax Cuts Japan and Yukoku Alliance				2,693	1.38
Social Democratic Party				2,416	1.24
Total		192,166	100.00	194,502	100.00
Invalid/blank votes					
Voter turnout			59.52		
Registered voters		329,429		329,429	
LDP gain from CRA					

Tokyo 2nd district
Party	Candidate	Constituency		Proportional	
Party	Candidate	Votes	%	Votes	%
Liberal Democratic Party	Kiyoto Tsuji	84,690	43.27	69,593	35.03
Democratic Party For the People	Kiichirō Hatoyama	36,021	18.41	22,362	11.26
Team Mirai	Akihiro Dobashi	25,018	12.78	33,744	16.99
Centrist Reform Alliance				22,211	11.18
Nippon Ishin no Kai	Mitsuru Imamura	16,609	8.49	13,768	6.93
Japanese Communist Party	Mari Hosono	15,358	7.85	8,748	4.40
Sanseito	Yusuke Kaieda	13,844	7.07	12,247	6.17
Conservative Party of Japan				7,291	3.67
Other	Cocoro Amano	4,162	2.13		
Reiwa Shinsengumi				4,202	2.12
Tax Cuts Japan and Yukoku Alliance				2,679	1.35
Social Democratic Party				1,808	0.91
Total		195,702	100.00	198,653	100.00
Invalid/blank votes					
Voter turnout			61.29		
Registered voters		326,823		326,823	
LDP hold					

Tokyo 3rd district
Party	Candidate	Constituency		Proportional	
Party	Candidate	Votes	%	Votes	%
Liberal Democratic Party	Hirotaka Ishihara	93,158	42.64	73,864	33.33
Team Mirai				34,117	15.39
Centrist Reform Alliance	Yumiko Abe	53,584	24.52	31,914	14.40
Democratic Party For the People	Shingo Ishida	34,805	15.93	25,267	11.40
Nippon Ishin no Kai	Toru Ishizaki	19,403	8.88	14,810	6.68
Sanseito	Hirotaka Ueki	17,543	8.03	13,397	6.05
Japanese Communist Party				11,728	5.29
Conservative Party of Japan				6,896	3.11
Reiwa Shinsengumi				4,706	2.12
Tax Cuts Japan and Yukoku Alliance				2,716	1.23
Social Democratic Party				2,197	0.99
Total		218,493	100.00	221,612	100.00
Invalid/blank votes					
Voter turnout			61.28		
Registered voters		364,905		364,905	
LDP hold					

Tokyo 4th district
Party	Candidate	Constituency		Proportional	
Party	Candidate	Votes	%	Votes	%
Liberal Democratic Party	Masaaki Taira	114,054	49.39	80,356	33.43
Centrist Reform Alliance				36,038	14.99
Democratic Party For the People	Masae Ido	55,610	24.08	29,504	12.27
Team Mirai				28,716	11.95
Sanseito	Etsuko Shima	31,577	13.68	17,602	7.32
Japanese Communist Party	Tomoyuki Tanigawa	29,667	12.85	14,958	6.22
Nippon Ishin no Kai				14,912	6.20
Conservative Party of Japan				7,655	3.18
Reiwa Shinsengumi				5,464	2.27
Tax Cuts Japan and Yukoku Alliance				2,818	1.17
Social Democratic Party				2,350	0.98
Total		230,908	100.00	240,373	100.00
Invalid/blank votes					
Voter turnout			56.44		
Registered voters		430,015		430,015	
LDP hold					

Tokyo 5th district
Party	Candidate	Constituency		Proportional	
Party	Candidate	Votes	%	Votes	%
Liberal Democratic Party	Kenji Wakamiya	89,078	39.06	75,180	32.39
Team Mirai				38,778	16.71
Centrist Reform Alliance	Yoshio Tezuka	58,164	25.50	33,656	14.50
Democratic Party For the People	Yukiko Kawazuru	33,140	14.53	24,165	10.41
Nippon Ishin no Kai	Taro Inaba	27,889	12.23	15,745	6.78
Sanseito	Toshiko Matsuoka	19,809	8.69	13,615	5.87
Japanese Communist Party				12,149	5.23
Conservative Party of Japan				6,624	2.85
Reiwa Shinsengumi				5,858	2.52
Tax Cuts Japan and Yukoku Alliance				3,354	1.44
Social Democratic Party				2,990	1.29
Total		228,080	100.00	232,114	100.00
Invalid/blank votes					
Voter turnout			62.11		
Registered voters		376,754		376,754	
LDP gain from CRA					

Tokyo 6th district
Party	Candidate	Constituency		Proportional	
Party	Candidate	Votes	%	Votes	%
Liberal Democratic Party	Shōgo Azemoto	90,077	37.74	77,414	31.65
Centrist Reform Alliance	Takayuki Ochiai	79,262	33.21	38,076	15.57
Team Mirai				37,908	15.50
Democratic Party For the People	Katsuki Maruyama	43,524	18.24	26,937	11.01
Japanese Communist Party				15,036	6.15
Sanseito	Naoki Shimamura	23,362	9.79	14,547	5.95
Nippon Ishin no Kai				13,585	5.55
Reiwa Shinsengumi				6,976	2.85
Conservative Party of Japan				6,887	2.82
Social Democratic Party				3,791	1.55
Tax Cuts Japan and Yukoku Alliance				3,465	1.42
Other	Yasuhiro Fukumura	2,424	1.02		
Total		238,649	100.00	244,622	100.00
Invalid/blank votes					
Voter turnout			61.49		
Registered voters		401,521		401,521	
LDP gain from CRA					

Tokyo 7th district
Party	Candidate	Constituency		Proportional	
Party	Candidate	Votes	%	Votes	%
Liberal Democratic Party	Tamayo Marukawa	80,421	34.47	81,892	34.71
Centrist Reform Alliance	Akihiro Matsuo	52,576	22.53	31,433	13.32
Team Mirai	Yuya Mineshima	43,335	18.57	43,570	18.47
Democratic Party For the People	Nobuko Irie	21,018	9.01	21,185	8.98
Nippon Ishin no Kai	Yasuyuki Watanabe	19,637	8.42	14,346	6.08
Sanseito	Yurika Ishikawa	16,337	7.00	13,220	5.60
Japanese Communist Party				11,117	4.71
Conservative Party of Japan				7,796	3.30
Reiwa Shinsengumi				5,208	2.21
Tax Cuts Japan and Yukoku Alliance				3,825	1.62
Social Democratic Party				2,352	1.00
Total		233,324	100.00	235,944	100.00
Invalid/blank votes					
Voter turnout			59.21		
Registered voters		401,305		401,305	
LDP gain from CRA					

Tokyo 8th district
Party	Candidate	Constituency		Proportional	
Party	Candidate	Votes	%	Votes	%
Liberal Democratic Party	Hiroko Kado	108,020	44.29	77,960	31.67
Centrist Reform Alliance	Harumi Yoshida	77,620	31.82	38,971	15.83
Team Mirai				37,422	15.20
Democratic Party For the People	Issei Morita	26,989	11.07	26,426	10.73
Japanese Communist Party				17,194	6.98
Reiwa Shinsengumi	Tokuma Kaiho	11,419	4.68	8,232	3.34
Sanseito	Baku Nagai	10,642	4.36	12,485	5.07
Nippon Ishin no Kai				11,952	4.85
Conservative Party of Japan	Shiro Otani	8,110	3.32	8,475	3.44
Social Democratic Party				3,859	1.57
Tax Cuts Japan and Yukoku Alliance				3,220	1.31
Independent	Yukihiro Fujiwara	1,111	0.46		
Total		243,911	100.00	246,196	100.00
Invalid/blank votes					
Voter turnout			63.48		
Registered voters		390,864		390,864	
LDP gain from CRA					

Tokyo 9th district
Party	Candidate	Constituency		Proportional	
Party	Candidate	Votes	%	Votes	%
Liberal Democratic Party	Isshu Sugawara	78,927	43.03	62,297	33.44
Centrist Reform Alliance	Issei Yamagishi	56,175	30.63	32,329	17.35
Team Mirai				22,696	12.18
Democratic Party For the People	Michiyo Yakushiji	32,670	17.81	21,831	11.72
Sanseito	Fumiya Suzuki	15,638	8.53	11,644	6.25
Japanese Communist Party				10,570	5.67
Nippon Ishin no Kai				9,587	5.15
Conservative Party of Japan				5,289	2.84
Reiwa Shinsengumi				5,086	2.73
Social Democratic Party				2,549	1.37
Tax Cuts Japan and Yukoku Alliance				2,420	1.30
Total		183,410	100.00	186,298	100.00
Invalid/blank votes					
Voter turnout			61.03		
Registered voters		307,896		307,896	
LDP gain from CRA					

Tokyo 10th district
Party	Candidate	Constituency		Proportional	
Party	Candidate	Votes	%	Votes	%
Liberal Democratic Party	Hayato Suzuki	126,044	49.05	84,195	32.32
Team Mirai				42,741	16.41
Centrist Reform Alliance	Yosuke Suzuki	67,574	26.30	37,663	14.46
Democratic Party For the People	Mizuho Kajiwara	43,006	16.74	29,041	11.15
Japanese Communist Party				17,125	6.57
Sanseito	Shin Yasuda	17,646	6.87	14,465	5.55
Nippon Ishin no Kai				13,698	5.26
Conservative Party of Japan				9,098	3.49
Reiwa Shinsengumi				5,931	2.28
Social Democratic Party				3,347	1.28
Tax Cuts Japan and Yukoku Alliance				3,192	1.23
Other	Toru Koyama	2,686	1.05		
Total		256,956	100.00	260,496	100.00
Invalid/blank votes					
Voter turnout			62.91		
Registered voters		417,497		417,497	
LDP hold					

Tokyo 11th district
Party	Candidate	Constituency		Proportional	
Party	Candidate	Votes	%	Votes	%
Liberal Democratic Party	Hakubun Shimomura	69,077	31.49	71,052	31.98
Centrist Reform Alliance	Yukihiko Akutsu	53,001	24.16	35,969	16.19
Team Mirai				27,006	12.15
Democratic Party For the People	Kazumoto Takazawa	38,445	17.52	26,401	11.88
Nippon Ishin no Kai	Minoru Omamiuda	26,207	11.95	14,133	6.36
Sanseito	Emi Matsukata	19,149	8.73	14,560	6.55
Japanese Communist Party	Kaito Yokote	12,590	5.74	14,496	6.52
Conservative Party of Japan				7,483	3.37
Reiwa Shinsengumi				5,557	2.50
Social Democratic Party				2,821	1.27
Tax Cuts Japan and Yukoku Alliance				2,730	1.23
Other	Yasufumi Kuwajima	916	0.42		
Total		219,385	100.00	222,208	100.00
Invalid/blank votes					
Voter turnout			57.45		
Registered voters		390,467		390,467	
LDP gain from CRA					

Tokyo 12th district
Party	Candidate	Constituency		Proportional	
Party	Candidate	Votes	%	Votes	%
Liberal Democratic Party	Kei Takagi	78,774	35.03	71,017	31.29
Centrist Reform Alliance	Shota Nakahara	44,134	19.63	38,690	17.05
Team Mirai				27,422	12.08
Nippon Ishin no Kai	Tsukasa Abe	33,100	14.72	16,455	7.25
Democratic Party For the People	Yuki Kusumi	30,913	13.75	24,386	10.74
Japanese Communist Party	Seiko Tahara	20,616	9.17	16,540	7.29
Sanseito	Yuko Kuroishi	17,320	7.70	13,840	6.10
Conservative Party of Japan				7,464	3.29
Reiwa Shinsengumi				5,713	2.52
Social Democratic Party				2,830	1.25
Tax Cuts Japan and Yukoku Alliance				2,607	1.15
Total		224,857	100.00	226,964	100.00
Invalid/blank votes					
Voter turnout			60.54		
Registered voters		378,383		378,383	
LDP hold					

Tokyo 13th district
Party	Candidate	Constituency		Proportional	
Party	Candidate	Votes	%	Votes	%
Liberal Democratic Party	Shin Tsuchida	94,680	46.59	72,587	34.71
Centrist Reform Alliance				33,534	16.03
Democratic Party For the People	Yosuke Mori	66,140	32.55	27,303	13.05
Team Mirai				20,644	9.87
Japanese Communist Party	Shingo Sawada	23,371	11.50	12,954	6.19
Sanseito	Toshiko Kaji	19,021	9.36	14,834	7.09
Nippon Ishin no Kai				10,343	4.95
Conservative Party of Japan				6,451	3.08
Reiwa Shinsengumi				5,748	2.75
Tax Cuts Japan and Yukoku Alliance				2,691	1.29
Social Democratic Party				2,060	0.98
Total		203,212	100.00	209,149	100.00
Invalid/blank votes					
Voter turnout			54.03		
Registered voters		390,832		390,832	
LDP hold					

Tokyo 14th district
Party	Candidate	Constituency		Proportional	
Party	Candidate	Votes	%	Votes	%
Liberal Democratic Party	Midori Matsushima	109,892	50.23	77,345	33.84
Centrist Reform Alliance				33,447	14.63
Team Mirai				28,423	12.43
Democratic Party For the People	Takanori Chonan	49,312	22.54	27,915	12.21
Reiwa Shinsengumi	Mari Kushibuchi	20,647	9.44	8,344	3.65
Sanseito	Hisashi Tan	19,925	9.11	15,352	6.72
Nippon Ishin no Kai				13,180	5.77
Japanese Communist Party	Tsutomu Hara	19,007	8.69	11,995	5.25
Conservative Party of Japan				7,705	3.37
Tax Cuts Japan and Yukoku Alliance				2,779	1.22
Social Democratic Party				2,103	0.92
Total		218,783	100.00	228,588	100.00
Invalid/blank votes					
Voter turnout			56.91		
Registered voters		405,692		405,692	
LDP hold					

Tokyo 15th district
Party	Candidate	Constituency		Proportional	
Party	Candidate	Votes	%	Votes	%
Liberal Democratic Party	Kōki Ōzora	109,489	42.49	89,603	34.35
Centrist Reform Alliance	Natsumi Sakai	70,911	27.52	40,734	15.61
Team Mirai				36,743	14.08
Democratic Party For the People	Saaya Fukami	28,674	11.13	27,618	10.59
Nippon Ishin no Kai	Yurika Mitsugi	26,546	10.30	17,915	6.87
Sanseito	Kana Suzuki	14,770	5.73	14,845	5.69
Japanese Communist Party				13,600	5.21
Conservative Party of Japan				8,071	3.09
Reiwa Shinsengumi				5,518	2.12
Tax Cuts Japan and Yukoku Alliance	Toshiaki Yoshino	7,296	2.83	3,716	1.42
Social Democratic Party				2,520	0.97
Total		257,686	100.00	260,883	100.00
Invalid/blank votes					
Voter turnout			60.88		
Registered voters		432,742		432,742	
LDP gain from CRA					

Tokyo 16th district
Party	Candidate	Constituency		Proportional	
Party	Candidate	Votes	%	Votes	%
Liberal Democratic Party	Yohei Onishi	92,858	44.63	73,989	35.02
Centrist Reform Alliance	Katsuyuki Shibata	51,527	24.76	35,253	16.68
Democratic Party For the People	Tomoko Takeuchi	42,380	20.37	25,726	12.18
Team Mirai				22,763	10.77
Sanseito	Takeshi Murakami	21,320	10.25	15,713	7.44
Nippon Ishin no Kai				11,778	5.57
Japanese Communist Party				9,114	4.31
Conservative Party of Japan				6,851	3.24
Reiwa Shinsengumi				5,688	2.69
Tax Cuts Japan and Yukoku Alliance				2,555	1.21
Social Democratic Party				1,860	0.88
Total		208,085	100.00	211,290	100.00
Invalid/blank votes					
Voter turnout			54.48		
Registered voters		391,523		391,523	
LDP hold					

Tokyo 17th district
Party	Candidate	Constituency		Proportional	
Party	Candidate	Votes	%	Votes	%
Liberal Democratic Party	Katsuei Hirasawa	73,234	36.18	68,592	33.33
Centrist Reform Alliance	Mari Sorita	44,594	22.03	35,593	17.29
Democratic Party For the People	Takako Hasegawa	28,282	13.97	22,759	11.06
Team Mirai				21,114	10.26
Nippon Ishin no Kai	Sachiko Inokuchi	27,630	13.65	14,611	7.10
Sanseito	Shinichiro Sugiura	19,291	9.53	14,976	7.28
Japanese Communist Party				11,722	5.70
Independent	Yoriko Madoka	7,328	3.62		
Conservative Party of Japan				6,409	3.11
Reiwa Shinsengumi				5,477	2.66
Tax Cuts Japan and Yukoku Alliance				2,494	1.21
Other	Shinju Suzuki	2,068	1.02		
Social Democratic Party				2,054	1.00
Total		202,427	100.00	205,801	100.00
Invalid/blank votes					
Voter turnout			54.26		
Registered voters		383,490		383,490	
LDP hold					

Tokyo 18th district
Party	Candidate	Constituency		Proportional	
Party	Candidate	Votes	%	Votes	%
Liberal Democratic Party	Kaoru Fukuda	117,383	47.71	80,079	32.19
Centrist Reform Alliance	Reiko Matsushita	69,722	28.34	43,890	17.64
Team Mirai				33,691	13.54
Democratic Party For the People	Yuma Suzuki	33,497	13.61	28,562	11.48
Japanese Communist Party				15,602	6.27
Sanseito	Yukiko Tokunaga	17,121	6.96	14,298	5.75
Nippon Ishin no Kai				12,160	4.89
Other	Aya Yoshida	8,330	3.39		
Conservative Party of Japan				6,868	2.76
Reiwa Shinsengumi				6,642	2.67
Social Democratic Party				3,832	1.54
Tax Cuts Japan and Yukoku Alliance				3,160	1.27
Total		246,053	100.00	248,784	100.00
Invalid/blank votes					
Voter turnout			62.79		
Registered voters		399,636		399,636	
LDP hold					

Tokyo 19th district
Party	Candidate	Constituency		Proportional	
Party	Candidate	Votes	%	Votes	%
Liberal Democratic Party	Yohei Matsumoto	93,697	45.86	65,498	31.86
Centrist Reform Alliance	Yoshinori Suematsu	54,345	26.60	39,213	19.08
Team Mirai				25,364	12.34
Democratic Party For the People	Reiko Suwa	28,452	13.93	22,723	11.05
Japanese Communist Party	Mitsuko Ideshige	14,350	7.02	13,906	6.77
Sanseito	Youko Ichinose	13,463	6.59	11,393	5.54
Nippon Ishin no Kai				10,006	4.87
Reiwa Shinsengumi				5,830	2.84
Conservative Party of Japan				5,533	2.69
Social Democratic Party				3,386	1.65
Tax Cuts Japan and Yukoku Alliance				2,702	1.31
Total		204,307	100.00	205,554	100.00
Invalid/blank votes					
Voter turnout			62.07		
Registered voters		334,029		334,029	
LDP gain from CRA					

Tokyo 20th district
Party	Candidate	Constituency		Proportional	
Party	Candidate	Votes	%	Votes	%
Liberal Democratic Party	Seiji Kihara	108,985	48.55	75,600	32.48
Centrist Reform Alliance				44,955	19.31
Democratic Party For the People	Kentaro Onishi	46,910	20.90	24,683	10.60
Team Mirai				21,523	9.25
Japanese Communist Party	Toru Miyamoto	45,031	20.06	19,233	8.26
Sanseito	Shigeki Kakeyama	23,544	10.49	16,616	7.14
Nippon Ishin no Kai				10,824	4.65
Reiwa Shinsengumi				6,950	2.99
Conservative Party of Japan				6,144	2.64
Social Democratic Party				3,262	1.40
Tax Cuts Japan and Yukoku Alliance				2,998	1.29
Total		224,470	100.00	232,788	100.00
Invalid/blank votes					
Voter turnout			56.30		
Registered voters		417,602		417,602	
LDP hold					

Tokyo 21st district
Party	Candidate	Constituency		Proportional	
Party	Candidate	Votes	%	Votes	%
Liberal Democratic Party	Kiyoshi Odawara	97,494	42.61	77,740	33.30
Centrist Reform Alliance	Retsu Suzuki	65,713	28.72	43,294	18.54
Democratic Party For the People	Taro Kuroda	37,086	16.21	25,659	10.99
Team Mirai				25,239	10.81
Sanseito	Nami Hoshino	22,373	9.78	15,233	6.52
Japanese Communist Party				14,815	6.35
Nippon Ishin no Kai				11,781	5.05
Reiwa Shinsengumi				6,477	2.77
Conservative Party of Japan				6,336	2.71
Tax Cuts Japan and Yukoku Alliance	Kazuhisa Yata	6,154	2.69	3,623	1.55
Social Democratic Party				3,280	1.40
Total		228,820	100.00	233,477	100.00
Invalid/blank votes					
Voter turnout			57.86		
Registered voters		406,978		406,978	
LDP gain from CRA					

Tokyo 22nd district
Party	Candidate	Constituency		Proportional	
Party	Candidate	Votes	%	Votes	%
Liberal Democratic Party	Tatsuya Ito	132,689	51.45	82,869	31.45
Centrist Reform Alliance	Ikuo Yamahana	87,494	33.93	44,144	16.75
Team Mirai				36,262	13.76
Democratic Party For the People				29,454	11.18
Japanese Communist Party				17,578	6.67
Sanseito	Mika Suzuki	37,697	14.62	16,273	6.18
Nippon Ishin no Kai				14,004	5.31
Reiwa Shinsengumi				7,712	2.93
Conservative Party of Japan				7,625	2.89
Social Democratic Party				4,077	1.55
Tax Cuts Japan and Yukoku Alliance				3,502	1.33
Total		257,880	100.00	263,500	100.00
Invalid/blank votes					
Voter turnout			61.87		
Registered voters		429,768		429,768	
LDP gain from CRA					

Tokyo 23rd district
Party	Candidate	Constituency		Proportional	
Party	Candidate	Votes	%	Votes	%
Liberal Democratic Party	Shinichiro Kawamatsu	92,171	45.29	70,080	33.88
Centrist Reform Alliance	Shunsuke Ito	69,908	34.35	39,367	19.03
Team Mirai				21,762	10.52
Democratic Party For the People				21,237	10.27
Sanseito	Yuki Funami	22,326	10.97	13,357	6.46
Japanese Communist Party	Yuichi Ikegawa	19,111	9.39	12,900	6.24
Nippon Ishin no Kai				10,729	5.19
Reiwa Shinsengumi				6,012	2.91
Conservative Party of Japan				5,536	2.68
Social Democratic Party				2,932	1.42
Tax Cuts Japan and Yukoku Alliance				2,931	1.42
Total		203,516	100.00	206,843	100.00
Invalid/blank votes					
Voter turnout			57.79		
Registered voters		361,249		361,249	
LDP gain from CRA					

Tokyo 24th district
Party	Candidate	Constituency		Proportional	
Party	Candidate	Votes	%	Votes	%
Liberal Democratic Party	Kōichi Hagiuda	85,806	41.06	70,966	33.62
Centrist Reform Alliance	Yu Hosogai	70,781	33.87	50,905	24.11
Democratic Party For the People	Ryo Hosoya	22,263	10.65	20,079	9.51
Team Mirai				17,707	8.39
Sanseito	Sayuri Yokura	16,909	8.09	14,529	6.88
Independent	Moe Fukuda	13,209	6.32		
Japanese Communist Party				11,730	5.56
Nippon Ishin no Kai				8,794	4.17
Reiwa Shinsengumi				5,803	2.75
Conservative Party of Japan				5,150	2.44
Tax Cuts Japan and Yukoku Alliance				2,823	1.34
Social Democratic Party				2,607	1.24
Total		208,968	100.00	211,093	100.00
Invalid/blank votes					
Voter turnout			56.39		
Registered voters		378,729		378,729	
LDP hold					

Tokyo 25th district
Party	Candidate	Constituency		Proportional	
Party	Candidate	Votes	%	Votes	%
Liberal Democratic Party	Shinji Inoue	109,606	50.48	78,964	35.85
Centrist Reform Alliance	Karen Yoda	50,219	23.13	42,629	19.36
Democratic Party For the People	Hisataka Munakata	21,515	9.91	21,023	9.55
Team Mirai				18,122	8.23
Sanseito	Nami Kimura	20,603	9.49	16,429	7.46
Nippon Ishin no Kai	Taro Miyazaki	15,185	6.99	12,678	5.76
Japanese Communist Party				12,242	5.56
Reiwa Shinsengumi				6,628	3.01
Conservative Party of Japan				5,614	2.55
Tax Cuts Japan and Yukoku Alliance				2,983	1.35
Social Democratic Party				2,924	1.33
Total		217,128	100.00	220,236	100.00
Invalid/blank votes					
Voter turnout			54.51		
Registered voters		408,868		408,868	
LDP hold					

Tokyo 26th district
Party	Candidate	Constituency		Proportional	
Party	Candidate	Votes	%	Votes	%
Liberal Democratic Party	Ueki Imaoka	92,329	34.68	90,451	33.76
Independent	Jin Matsubara	82,119	30.85		
Team Mirai	Noboru Usami	34,706	13.04	45,564	17.01
Centrist Reform Alliance				36,453	13.61
Democratic Party For the People	Yuki Sakamoto	24,307	9.13	29,171	10.89
Nippon Ishin no Kai				15,901	5.94
Japanese Communist Party	Kanako Matsui	19,663	7.39	14,624	5.46
Sanseito	Keiko Suganuma	13,072	4.91	15,051	5.62
Conservative Party of Japan				7,917	2.96
Reiwa Shinsengumi				6,237	2.33
Tax Cuts Japan and Yukoku Alliance				3,498	1.31
Social Democratic Party				3,042	1.14
Total		266,196	100.00	267,909	100.00
Invalid/blank votes					
Voter turnout			62.57		
Registered voters		432,529		432,529	
LDP gain from Independent					

Tokyo 27th district
Party	Candidate	Constituency		Proportional	
Party	Candidate	Votes	%	Votes	%
Liberal Democratic Party	Yuichi Kurosaki	85,249	38.15	71,800	31.71
Centrist Reform Alliance	Akira Nagatsuma	80,997	36.25	37,589	16.60
Team Mirai				31,654	13.98
Democratic Party For the People	Takashi Suyama	37,848	16.94	25,424	11.23
Japanese Communist Party				14,644	6.47
Sanseito	Aiko Ogasawara	19,374	8.67	13,619	6.01
Nippon Ishin no Kai				11,106	4.90
Conservative Party of Japan				8,061	3.56
Reiwa Shinsengumi				6,352	2.81
Tax Cuts Japan and Yukoku Alliance				3,161	1.40
Social Democratic Party				3,033	1.34
Total		223,468	100.00	226,443	100.00
Invalid/blank votes					
Voter turnout			59.78		
Registered voters		381,964		381,964	
LDP gain from CRA					

Tokyo 28th district
Party	Candidate	Constituency		Proportional	
Party	Candidate	Votes	%	Votes	%
Liberal Democratic Party	Takao Ando	69,037	36.64	61,184	32.11
Centrist Reform Alliance	Satoshi Takamatsu	41,482	22.02	29,942	15.71
Team Mirai				26,163	13.73
Democratic Party For the People	Hiroaki Misawa	28,905	15.34	22,590	11.86
Nippon Ishin no Kai	Naho Hashiguchi	18,743	9.95	11,566	6.07
Sanseito	Kazuki Muramatsu	17,211	9.13	12,149	6.38
Japanese Communist Party	Naomi Takano	13,045	6.92	11,500	6.04
Conservative Party of Japan				5,843	3.07
Reiwa Shinsengumi				4,869	2.56
Social Democratic Party				2,459	1.29
Tax Cuts Japan and Yukoku Alliance				2,287	1.20
Total		188,423	100.00	190,552	100.00
Invalid/blank votes					
Voter turnout			61.08		
Registered voters		314,452		314,452	
LDP gain from CRA					

Tokyo 29th district
Party	Candidate	Constituency		Proportional	
Party	Candidate	Votes	%	Votes	%
Liberal Democratic Party	Kosuke Nagasawa	80,538	41.36	65,834	33.47
Centrist Reform Alliance	Taketsuka Kimura	45,358	23.29	35,215	17.90
Team Mirai				21,143	10.75
Democratic Party For the People	Yoshikazu Tarui	26,692	13.71	20,848	10.60
Conservative Party of Japan	Eiji Kosaka	14,101	7.24	8,431	4.29
Sanseito	Tetsuro Horikawa	14,071	7.23	13,476	6.85
Japanese Communist Party	Kenichi Suzuki	13,976	7.18	12,530	6.37
Nippon Ishin no Kai				9,893	5.03
Reiwa Shinsengumi				5,115	2.60
Tax Cuts Japan and Yukoku Alliance				2,325	1.18
Social Democratic Party				1,891	0.96
Total		194,736	100.00	196,701	100.00
Invalid/blank votes					
Voter turnout			55.68		
Registered voters		356,570		356,570	
LDP gain from CRA					

Tokyo 30th district
Party	Candidate	Constituency		Proportional	
Party	Candidate	Votes	%	Votes	%
Liberal Democratic Party	Akihisa Nagashima	110,453	45.15	81,415	32.72
Centrist Reform Alliance	Eri Igarashi	81,082	33.15	46,455	18.67
Team Mirai				29,488	11.85
Democratic Party For the People	Ryusei Kawakami	32,504	13.29	27,634	11.10
Sanseito	Reiko Kotobuki	20,586	8.42	15,369	6.18
Japanese Communist Party				14,748	5.93
Nippon Ishin no Kai				13,014	5.23
Conservative Party of Japan				6,964	2.80
Reiwa Shinsengumi				6,821	2.74
Social Democratic Party				3,730	1.50
Tax Cuts Japan and Yukoku Alliance				3,214	1.29
Total		244,625	100.00	248,852	100.00
Invalid/blank votes					
Voter turnout			59.58		
Registered voters		421,486		421,486	
LDP gain from CRA					

== Proportional representation ==
Proportional representation results
Party	Votes	Seats	Rank	Elected member	Constituency	Ratio
LDP	2,243,625 (33.1%)	8 → 3 (Note: Forfeited five seats due to lack of candidates.)	30	Masashi Tanaka		
LDP	2,243,625 (33.1%)	8 → 3	31	Yuko Tsuji		
LDP	2,243,625 (33.1%)	8 → 3	32	Kiyoko Morihara		
CRA	1,119,155 (16.5%)	3 → 5	1	Mitsunari Okamoto		
CRA	1,119,155 (16.5%)	3 → 5	2	Koichi Kasai		
CRA	1,119,155 (16.5%)	3 → 5	3	Eriko Omori		
CRA	1,119,155 (16.5%)	3 → 5	4	Akira Nagatsuma	Tokyo 27th	95.0%
CRA	1,119,155 (16.5%)	3 → 5	4	Takayuki Ochiai	Tokyo 6th	87.9%
Mirai	887,849 (13.1%)	3 → 4	1	Satoshi Takayama		
Mirai	887,849 (13.1%)	3 → 4	2	Yuya Mineshima	Tokyo 7th	53.8%
Mirai	887,849 (13.1%)	3 → 4	3	Noboru Usami	Tokyo 26th	37.5%
Mirai	887,849 (13.1%)	3 → 4	4	Akihiro Dobashi	Tokyo 2nd	29.5%
DPFP	746,660 (11.0%)	2 → 3	1	Yosuke Mori	Tokyo 13th	69.8%
DPFP	746,660 (11.0%)	2 → 3	1	Kazumoto Takazawa	Tokyo 11th	55.6%
DPFP	746,660 (11.0%)	2 → 3	1	Masae Ido	Tokyo 4th	48.7%
Sansei	427,028 (6.3%)	1 → 2	1	Rina Yoshikawa	Tokyo 1st	30.5%
Sansei	427,028 (6.3%)	1 → 2	2	Mika Suzuki	Tokyo 22nd	28.4%
JCP	407,146 (6.0%)	1	1	Tomoko Tamura		
Ishin	384,487 (5.7%)	1	1	Tsukasa Abe	Tokyo 12th	42.0%

Liberal Democratic Party 2,243,625 (33.10%) 8 seats (5 unfilled)
Rank	Candidate	Constituency	Ratio
1	Miki Yamada	Tokyo 1st	Won
1	Kiyoto Tsuji	Tokyo 2nd	Won
1	Hirotaka Ishihara	Tokyo 3rd	Won
1	Masaaki Taira	Tokyo 4th	Won
1	Kenji Wakamiya	Tokyo 5th	Won
1	Shōgo Azemoto	Tokyo 6th	Won
1	Tamayo Marukawa	Tokyo 7th	Won
1	Hiroko Kado	Tokyo 8th	Won
1	Isshu Sugawara	Tokyo 9th	Won
1	Hayato Suzuki	Tokyo 10th	Won
1	Hakubun Shimomura	Tokyo 11th	Won
1	Kei Takagi	Tokyo 12th	Won
1	Shin Tsuchida	Tokyo 13th	Won
1	Midori Matsushima	Tokyo 14th	Won
1	Kōki Ōzora	Tokyo 15th	Won
1	Yohei Onishi	Tokyo 16th	Won
1	Kaoru Fukuda	Tokyo 18th	Won
1	Yohei Matsumoto	Tokyo 19th	Won
1	Seiji Kihara	Tokyo 20th	Won
1	Kiyoshi Odawara	Tokyo 21st	Won
1	Tatsuya Ito	Tokyo 22nd	Won
1	Shinichiro Kawamatsu	Tokyo 23rd	Won
1	Kōichi Hagiuda	Tokyo 24th	Won
1	Shinji Inoue	Tokyo 25th	Won
1	Ueki Imaoka	Tokyo 26th	Won
1	Yuichi Kurosaki	Tokyo 27th	Won
1	Takao Ando	Tokyo 28th	Won
1	Kosuke Nagasawa	Tokyo 29th	Won
1	Akihisa Nagashima	Tokyo 30th	Won
30	Masashi Tanaka		
31	Yuko Tsuji		
32	Kiyoko Morihara		

Centrist Reform Alliance 1,119,155 (16.51%) 3 seats (plus 2)
Rank	Candidate	Constituency	Ratio
1	Mitsunari Okamoto		
2	Koichi Kasai		
3	Eriko Omori		
4	Akira Nagatsuma	Tokyo 27th	95.0
4	Takayuki Ochiai	Tokyo 6th	87.9
4	Yu Hosogai	Tokyo 24th	82.4
4	Yukihiko Akutsu	Tokyo 11th	76.7
4	Shunsuke Ito	Tokyo 23rd	75.8
4	Eri Igarashi	Tokyo 30th	73.4
4	Harumi Yoshida	Tokyo 8th	71.8
4	Issei Yamagishi	Tokyo 9th	71.1
4	Retsu Suzuki	Tokyo 21st	67.4
4	Ikuo Yamahana	Tokyo 22nd	65.9
4	Akihiro Matsuo	Tokyo 7th	65.3
4	Yoshio Tezuka	Tokyo 5th	65.2
4	Natsumi Sakai	Tokyo 15th	64.7
4	Mari Sorita	Tokyo 17th	60.8
4	Satoshi Takamatsu	Tokyo 28th	60.0
4	Reiko Matsushita	Tokyo 18th	59.3
4	Banri Kaieda	Tokyo 1st	59.1
4	Yoshinori Suematsu	Tokyo 19th	58.0
4	Yumiko Abe	Tokyo 3rd	57.5
4	Taketsuka Kimura	Tokyo 29th	56.3
4	Shota Nakahara	Tokyo 12th	56.0
4	Katsuyuki Shibata	Tokyo 16th	55.4
4	Yosuke Suzuki	Tokyo 10th	53.6
4	Karen Yoda	Tokyo 25th	45.8

Team Mirai 887,849 (13.10%) 3 seats (plus 1)
Rank	Candidate	Constituency	Ratio
1	Satoshi Takayama		
2	Yuya Mineshima	Tokyo 7th	53.8
3	Noboru Usami	Tokyo 26th	37.5
4	Akihiro Dobashi	Tokyo 2nd	29.5

Democratic Party For the People 746,660 (11.02%) 2 seats (plus 1)
Rank	Candidate	Constituency	Ratio
1	Yosuke Mori	Tokyo 13th	69.8
1	Kazumoto Takazawa	Tokyo 11th	55.6
1	Masae Ido	Tokyo 4th	48.7
1	Katsuki Maruyama	Tokyo 6th	48.3
1	Tomoko Takeuchi	Tokyo 16th	45.6
1	Takanori Chonan	Tokyo 14th	44.8
1	Takashi Suyama	Tokyo 27th	44.3
1	Kentaro Onishi	Tokyo 20th	43.0
1	Kiichirō Hatoyama	Tokyo 2nd	42.5
1	Hiroaki Misawa	Tokyo 28th	41.8
1	Michiyo Yakushiji	Tokyo 9th	41.3
1	Yuki Kusumi	Tokyo 12th	39.2
1	Takako Hasegawa	Tokyo 17th	38.6
1	Taro Kuroda	Tokyo 21st	38.0
1	Shingo Ishida	Tokyo 3rd	37.3
1	Yukiko Kawazuru	Tokyo 5th	37.2
1	Mizuho Kajiwara	Tokyo 10th	34.1
1	Yoshikazu Tarui	Tokyo 29th	33.1
1	Reiko Suwa	Tokyo 19th	30.3
1	Ryusei Kawakami	Tokyo 30th	29.4
1	Yuma Suzuki	Tokyo 18th	28.5
1	~~Yuki Sakamoto~~ (Note: Ineligible for election - failed to surpass the required 10% of votes in their single-member constituency race.)	Tokyo 26th	26.3
1	Saaya Fukami	Tokyo 15th	26.1
1	~~Nobuko Irie~~	Tokyo 7th	26.1
1	Ryo Hosoya	Tokyo 24th	25.9
1	Issei Morita	Tokyo 8th	24.9
1	~~Hisataka Munakata~~	Tokyo 25th	19.6

Sanseito 427,028 (6.30%) 1 seat (plus 1)
Rank	Candidate	Constituency	Ratio
1	Rina Yoshikawa	Tokyo 1st	30.5
2	Mika Suzuki	Tokyo 22nd	28.4
2	~~Kazuki Muramatsu~~	Tokyo 28th	24.9
2	~~Hirotaka Ueki~~	Tokyo 3rd	18.8
2	~~Yukiko Tokunaga~~	Tokyo 18th	14.6
6	Akina Nonoda		

Japanese Communist Party 407,146 (6.01%) 1 seat
Rank	Candidate	Constituency	Ratio
1	Tomoko Tamura		
2	Toru Miyamoto	Tokyo 20th	41.3
3	Tomoyuki Tanigawa	Tokyo 4th	26.0

Nippon Ishin no Kai 384,496 (5.67%) 1 seat
Rank	Candidate	Constituency	Ratio
1	Tsukasa Abe	Tokyo 12th	42.0
1	Minoru Omamiuda	Tokyo 11th	37.9
1	Sachiko Inokuchi	Tokyo 17th	37.7
1	Taro Inaba	Tokyo 5th	31.3
1	~~Naho Hashiguchi~~	Tokyo 28th	27.1
1	Asuka Haruyama	Tokyo 1st	24.4
1	~~Yasuyuki Watanabe~~	Tokyo 7th	24.4
1	Yurika Mitsugi	Tokyo 15th	24.2
1	~~Toru Ishizaki~~	Tokyo 3rd	20.8
1	~~Mitsuru Imamura~~	Tokyo 2nd	19.6
1	~~Taro Miyazaki~~	Tokyo 25th	13.9

Conservative Party of Japan 209,329 (3.09%) 0 seats
Rank	Candidate	Constituency	Ratio
1	~~Eiji Kosaka~~	Tokyo 29th	17.5
1	~~Shiro Otani~~	Tokyo 8th	7.5
3	Koji Hirai		

Reiwa Shinsengumi 179,614 (2.65%) 0 seats
Rank	Candidate	Constituency	Ratio
1	~~Mari Kushibuchi~~	Tokyo 14th	18.8
2	Misao Redwolf		

Tax Cuts Japan and Yukoku Alliance 89,161 (1.32%) 0 seats
Rank	Candidate	Constituency	Ratio
1	~~Toshiaki Yoshino~~	Tokyo 15th	6.7
2	~~Kazuhisa Yata~~	Tokyo 21st	6.3

Social Democratic Party 84,362 (1.24%) 0 seats
Rank	Candidate	Constituency	Ratio
1	Yūko Ōtsubaki		
