= Chief Representative of Komeito =

Position in the Japanese Komeito party

Chief Representative of the Komeito Standing Committee
- 公明党常任役員会代表; Kōmeitō Jōnin Yakuin-kai Daihyō
- Incumbent; Mitsunari Okamoto since 3 October 2026
- Komeito Standing Committee
- Type: Party leader
- Appointer: Party Convention
- Inaugural holder: Kenji Miyamoto

The chief representative of Komeito (Japanese: 公明党代表, Hepburn: Kōmeitō Daihyō) is the highest position within Komeito. The current chief representative is Mitsunari Okamoto, who took office on 3 October 2026.

== Election ==
The chief representative is elected by the Party Convention. To run for the leadership election, a candidate must be recommended by at least 10 Komeito members of the National Diet and submit a prescribed document outlining their candidacy aspirations and basic policies. Afterwards, the Party Convention delegates vote to elect the leader.

== List of chief representatives ==
No.	Name (Birth–death)	Constituency / title	Term of office		Image	Prime Minister (term)	Government/ opposition
No.	Name (Birth–death)	Constituency / title	Took office	Left office	Image	Prime Minister (term)	Government/ opposition
New Komei Party (1994–1998)
1	Kōshirō Ishida (1930–2006)	Rep for Aichi 6th	5 December 1994	9 December 1994		Murayama 1994–96	Opposition
Komei (1994–1998)
1	Tomio Fujii (1924–2021)	Tokyo Metropolitan Assembly for Shinjuku district	5 December 1994	18 January 1998		Murayama 1994–96	Opposition
1	Tomio Fujii (1924–2021)	Tokyo Metropolitan Assembly for Shinjuku district	5 December 1994	18 January 1998		Hashimoto 1996–98	Opposition
2	Toshiko Hamayotsu (1945–2020)	Cou for Tokyo at-large	18 January 1998	7 November 1998		Hashimoto 1996–98	Opposition
2	Toshiko Hamayotsu (1945–2020)	Cou for Tokyo at-large	18 January 1998	7 November 1998		Obuchi 1998–2000	Opposition
New Peace Party (1998)
1	Takenori Kanzaki (b. 1943)	Rep for Fukuoka 1st	4 January 1998	7 November 1998		Hashimoto 1996–98	Opposition
1	Takenori Kanzaki (b. 1943)	Rep for Fukuoka 1st	4 January 1998	7 November 1998		Obuchi 1998–2000	Opposition
Reimei Club (1998)
1	Kazuyoshi Shirahama (b. 1947)	Cou for Osaka at-large	4 January 1998	18 January 1998		Hashimoto 1996–98	Opposition
New Komeito (1998–2014)
1	Takenori Kanzaki (b. 1943)	Rep for Fukuoka 1st (1983–2005); Kyushu PR block (2005–2010)	7 November 1998	30 September 2006		Obuchi 1998–2000	Opposition until 5 October 1999 (Obuchi First reshuffled cabinet)
1	Takenori Kanzaki (b. 1943)	Rep for Fukuoka 1st (1983–2005); Kyushu PR block (2005–2010)	7 November 1998	30 September 2006		Obuchi 1998–2000	Governing coalition from 5 October 1999 (Obuchi Second reshuffled cabinet)
1	Takenori Kanzaki (b. 1943)	Rep for Fukuoka 1st (1983–2005); Kyushu PR block (2005–2010)	7 November 1998	30 September 2006		Mori 2000–01	Governing coalition from 5 October 1999 (Obuchi Second reshuffled cabinet)
1	Takenori Kanzaki (b. 1943)	Rep for Fukuoka 1st (1983–2005); Kyushu PR block (2005–2010)	7 November 1998	30 September 2006		Koizumi 2001–06	Governing coalition from 5 October 1999 (Obuchi Second reshuffled cabinet)
1	Takenori Kanzaki (b. 1943)	Rep for Fukuoka 1st (1983–2005); Kyushu PR block (2005–2010)	7 November 1998	30 September 2006		Abe S. 2006–07	Governing coalition from 5 October 1999 (Obuchi Second reshuffled cabinet)
2	Akihiro Ota (b. 1945)	Rep for Tokyo 12th	30 September 2006	8 September 2009		Abe S. 2006–07	Governing coalition from 5 October 1999 (Obuchi Second reshuffled cabinet)
2	Akihiro Ota (b. 1945)	Rep for Tokyo 12th	30 September 2006	8 September 2009		Fukuda Y. 2007–08	Governing coalition from 5 October 1999 (Obuchi Second reshuffled cabinet)
2	Akihiro Ota (b. 1945)	Rep for Tokyo 12th	30 September 2006	8 September 2009		Asō 2008–09	Governing coalition from 5 October 1999 (Obuchi Second reshuffled cabinet)
3	Natsuo Yamaguchi (b. 1952)	Cou for Tokyo at-large	8 September 2009	25 September 2014		Hatoyama Y. 2009–10	Opposition
3	Natsuo Yamaguchi (b. 1952)	Cou for Tokyo at-large	8 September 2009	25 September 2014		Kan 2010–11	Opposition
3	Natsuo Yamaguchi (b. 1952)	Cou for Tokyo at-large	8 September 2009	25 September 2014		Noda 2011–12	Opposition
3	Natsuo Yamaguchi (b. 1952)	Cou for Tokyo at-large	8 September 2009	25 September 2014		Abe S. 2012–20	Governing coalition
Komeito (2014–present)
1	Natsuo Yamaguchi (b. 1952)	Cou for Tokyo at-large	25 September 2014	28 September 2024		Abe S. 2012–20	Governing coalition
1	Natsuo Yamaguchi (b. 1952)	Cou for Tokyo at-large	25 September 2014	28 September 2024		Suga 2020–2021	Governing coalition
1	Natsuo Yamaguchi (b. 1952)	Cou for Tokyo at-large	25 September 2014	28 September 2024		Kishida 2021–2024	Governing coalition
2	Keiichi Ishii (b. 1958)	Rep for Northern Kanto PR block	28 September 2024	9 November 2024		Ishiba 2024–2025	Governing coalition
3	Tetsuo Saito (b. 1952)	Rep for Hiroshima 3rd	9 November 2024	21 January 2026		Ishiba 2024–2025	Governing coalition
3	Tetsuo Saito (b. 1952)	Rep for Hiroshima 3rd	9 November 2024	21 January 2026		Takaichi 2025–present	Opposition
4	Toshiko Takeya (b. 1969)	Cou for Tokyo at-large	22 January 2026	3 October 2026		Takaichi 2025–present	Opposition
5	Mitsunari Okamoto (b. 1965)	Rep for Tokyo PR	3 October 2026	Incumbent		Takaichi 2025–present	Opposition
