= Liberal Democratic Party–Komeito coalition =

Liberal Democratic Party–Komeito coalition 自公連立政権 Jikō Renritsu Seiken
- First leaders: Keizō Obuchi (LDP); Takenori Kanzaki (Komeito)
- Last leaders: Sanae Takaichi (LDP); Tetsuo Saito (Komeito)
- Founded: 5 October 1999; 27 years ago
- Dissolved: 10 October 2025; 13 months ago
- Ideology: Koizumi administration: Libertarian populism; Abe administration: Japanese nationalism; Right-wing populism
- Political position: Big tent
- Alliance parties: Liberal Democratic Party; Komeito
- Politics of Japan; Political parties; Elections; A: Komeito is a centrist party, however the Centre-right to right-wing LDP held a much larger number of seats.

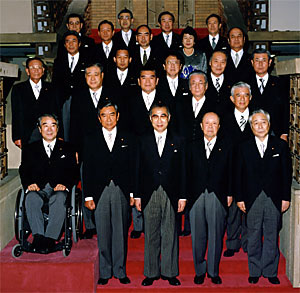
Obuchi's second remodeled cabinet, 1999

The Liberal Democratic Party–Komeito coalition was an alliance in Japan between the Liberal Democratic Party (LDP) and Komeito. A coalition government between the parties has been established twice: the first from 5 October 1999 to 16 September 2009, and the second from 26 December 2012 to 10 October 2025, when Komeito announced their exit from the coalition.

== History ==
The two parties formed a coalition in October 1999 during the premiership of Keizō Obuchi.

The coalition was roundly defeated and lost power in the 2009 general election. In the general election on 16 December 2012, the LDP/Komeito coalition secured a supermajority and came back into government.

In the 2024 general election, the LDP–Komeito coalition lost its majority for the first time since 2009. Although the LDP still remained the largest party, the coalition fell short of the 233 seats needed for a majority, securing only 215 and they formed the minority government.

On 10 October 2025, Komeito chief representative Tetsuo Saito announced that it would leave the ruling coalition, over disagreements with new LDP president Sanae Takaichi. Following Komeito's withdrawal, the LDP formed a coalition agreement with the Japan Innovation Party.

== Electoral results ==
=== House of Representatives ===
Election	Leaders		Seats		Constituency		PR Block		Position	Status
Election	LDP	Komeito	Number	+/-	Votes	%	Votes	%	Position	Status
2000	Yoshiro Mori	Takenori Kanzaki	264 / 480	New	26,177,560	42.99	24,705,457	41.28	1st	Majority
2003	Junichiro Koizumi	Takenori Kanzaki	271 / 480	▲7	26,975,834	45.34	29,393,629	49.74	1st	Majority
2005	Junichiro Koizumi	Takenori Kanzaki	327 / 480	▲56	33,499,495	49.21	34,875,418	51.43	1st	Majority
2009	Tarō Asō	Akihiro Ota	140 / 480	▼187	28,084,966	37.57	26,864,224	38.18	▼2nd	Opposition
2012	Shinzo Abe	Natsuo Yamaguchi	325 / 480	▲185	26,529,190	44.5	23,740,931	39.69	▲1st	Majority
2014	Shinzo Abe	Natsuo Yamaguchi	326 / 475	▲1	26,226,839	49.55	24,973,152	46.82	1st	Majority
2017	Shinzo Abe	Natsuo Yamaguchi	313 / 465	▼13	27,333,230	49.32	25,533,429	45.79	1st	Majority
2021	Fumio Kishida	Natsuo Yamaguchi	291 / 465	▼22	28,499,166	49.6	27,029,165	47.04	1st	Majority
2024	Shigeru Ishiba	Keiichi Ishii	215 / 465	▼76	21,598,163	39.81	20,547,105	37.66	1st	Minority

=== House of Councillors ===
Election	Leaders		Seats		Constituency		PR Block		Position	Status
Election	LDP	Komeito	Total	Contested	Votes	%	Votes	%	Position	Status
2001	Junichiro Koizumi	Takenori Kanzaki	134 / 247	77 / 121	25,768,489	47.42	29,302,531	53.53	1st	Majority
2004	Junichiro Koizumi	Takenori Kanzaki	139 / 242	60 / 121	21,849,718	38.93	25,418,951	45.44	1st	Majority
2007	Shinzo Abe	Akihiro Ota	103 / 242	46 / 121	22,140,865	37.31	24,310,000	41.26	▼2nd	Minority (until 2009)
2007	Shinzo Abe	Akihiro Ota	103 / 242	46 / 121	22,140,865	37.31	24,310,000	41.26	▼2nd	Opposition (since 2009)
2010	Sadakazu Tanigaki	Natsuo Yamaguchi	103 / 242	60 / 121	21,761,901	37.26	21,711,103	37.14	2nd	Opposition (until 2012)
2010	Sadakazu Tanigaki	Natsuo Yamaguchi	103 / 242	60 / 121	21,761,901	37.26	21,711,103	37.14	2nd	Minority (since 2012)
2013	Shinzo Abe	Natsuo Yamaguchi	135 / 242	76 / 121	25,405,639	47.87	26,028,417	48.9	▲1st	Majority
2016	Shinzo Abe	Natsuo Yamaguchi	146 / 242	70 / 121	26,854,215	47.48	27,687,748	49.43	1st	Majority
2019	Shinzo Abe	Natsuo Yamaguchi	141 / 245	71 / 124	23,943,689	47.54	24,248,709	48.42	1st	Majority
2022	Fumio Kishida	Natsuo Yamaguchi	146 / 248	76 / 125	24,203,788	45.51	24,437,677	46.09	1st	Majority
2025	Shigeru Ishiba	Tetsuo Saito	122 / 248	47 / 125	17,645,807	29.83	18,018,876	30.44	1st	Minority
