= Ai Aoki (politician) =

Japanese politician (born 1965)

- 青木 愛
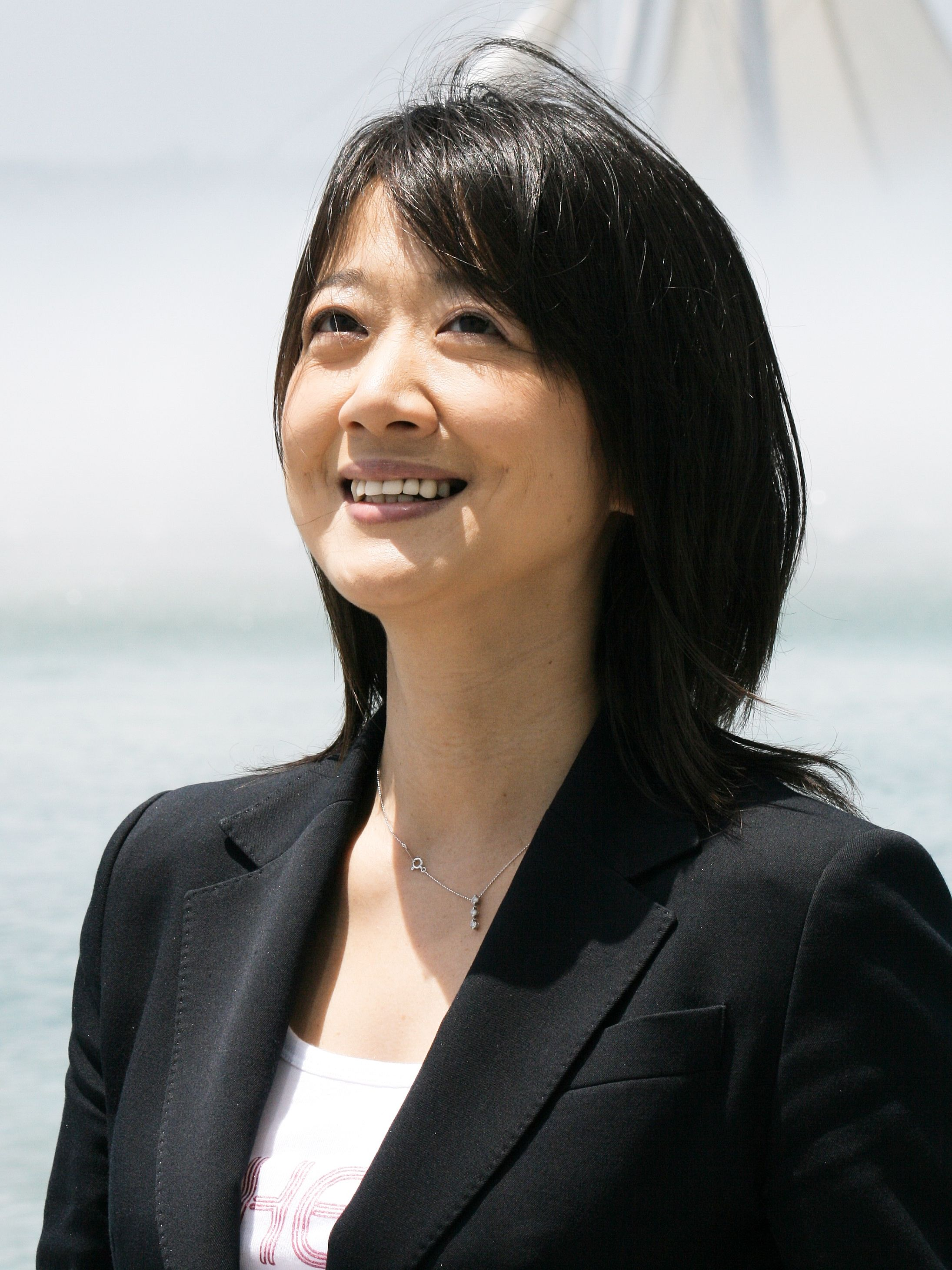
- Aoki in 2019

Member of the House of Councillors
- Incumbent
- Assumed office 26 July 2016
- Constituency: National PR
- In office 29 July 2007 – 18 August 2009
- Preceded by: Multi-member district
- Succeeded by: Tadashi Hirono
- Constituency: National PR

Member of the House of Representatives
- In office 30 August 2009 – 21 November 2014
- Preceded by: Akihiro Ota
- Succeeded by: Multi-member district
- Constituency: Tokyo 12th (2009–2012); Tokyo PR (2012–2014)
- In office 9 November 2003 – 8 August 2005
- Constituency: Southern Kanto PR

Personal details
- Born: 18 August 1965 (age 61) Sumida, Tokyo, Japan
- Party: CDP (since 2020)
- Other political affiliations: LP (2001–2003); DPJ (2003–2012); PLF (2012); TPJ (2012); PLP (2014–2019); DPP (2019–2020)
- Education: Chiba University (MEd)
- Website: www.aoki-ai.com

Ai Aoki (青木 愛, Aoki Ai; born 18 August 1965) is a Japanese politician and current member of the People's Life Party. She is a native of Tokyo and graduate of Chiba University. After a career in education, Aoki entered politics in 2003 and has served a total of four terms in the national Diet of Japan, having sat in the House of Representatives from 2003 to 2005 and 2009–2014, and a partial term in the House of Councillors from 2007 to 2009. Aoki was returned to the House of Councillors in the election held on 10 July 2016.

== Education and pre-politics career ==
Aoki was born in Tokyo and was raised in the town of Chikura, Chiba Prefecture. She graduated from Awa High School in 1984 and gained a bachelor's degree in education from Chiba University in 1988. She later obtained a master's degree in education from the university in 1999.

After graduating university Aoki was active as a singer-songwriter, releasing a total of six singles between 1989 and 1998, and an album titled Doko-e Iku-no (何処へ行くの, Where [will you] go?) in 1991. After completing her master's degree she gained employment at a kindergarten in Chikura.

== Political career ==
=== House of Representatives (2003–2005) ===
Aoki's father is a former member of the Chikura town assembly. In 2001 Aoki sought entry into the Ozawa Ichiro Seiji Juku, a cram school for aspiring politicians operated by Ichiro Ozawa, but was unable to enroll due to being one year over the school's upper age limit of 35. Despite this, Aoki received Ozawa's recommendation and joined the Liberal Party, a party founded by Ozawa three years earlier. In September 2003 the Liberal Party merged into the Democratic Party of Japan (DPJ) and Aoki contested the Chiba 12th district as a DPJ candidate at the October 2003 general election. Aoki received 40.8% of the vote but lost to the incumbent Liberal Democratic Party member Yasukazu Hamada, who received 53.9%. The DPJ received 40 per cent of the vote in the Southern Kanto proportional representation block, entitling them to nine of the 22 seats in the block. Aoki's comparatively low margin of defeat meant she gained the DPJ's final seat in block. In the 2005 general election Aoki again contested the Chiba 12th district against Hamada, this time losing by more than 50,000 votes and failing to retain her seat in the proportional representation block. During her two years in the House of Representatives Aoki served on the Committee on Health, Welfare and Labour, Committee on Education, Culture and Science and the Research Commission on the Constitution.

=== House of Councillors (2007–2009) ===
After losing her seat in the lower house of the Diet, Aoki turned her attention to contesting the July 2007 House of Councillors election. She ran in the National Block, where the DPJ won 20 of the 48 seats with 39.5% of the vote. Aoki personally received 297,034 votes, third-highest within the party and 13th highest overall. Whilst a councillor Aoki served on the Committee on Education, Culture and Science, Committee on Agriculture, Forestry and Fisheries, Committee on House Rules and Administration and the Special Committee on Disasters. Aoki was also a part of the Education, Culture and Science department within the DPJ's shadow cabinet.

In July 2009, whilst still in the second year of her six-year term as a Councillor, Aoki nominated as a candidate for the Tokyo 12th district in the August 2009 general election, thereby automatically losing her seat in the House of Councillors; she was replaced by fellow DPJ candidate Tadashi Hirono.

=== House of Representatives (2009–2014) ===
In the election Aoki defeated Akihiro Ota, the incumbent member and leader of the Komeito party, by more than 10,000 votes. This election brought the DPJ into power for the first time, and Aoki served in roles including as a director of the House's Committee on Health, Welfare and Labour and a director of the House's Committee on Fundamental National Policies. In September 2009 Ozawa became Secretary-General of the DPJ and the following month he announced Aoki as one of his deputies. In June 2010 friction between Ozawa and party president and Prime Minister Yukio Hatoyama led to both men resigning from their roles in order to give the party a "clean start". On 13 June five Ozawa faction members resigned from their positions within the party, including Aoki who resigned as Deputy Secretary-General.

On 24 January 2012 Aoki was selected as the Chairperson of the House's Special Committee on Consumer Affairs. On 2 July 2012 Aoki was one of fifty DPJ Diet members, led by Ozawa, to resign from the party after Prime Minister Yoshihiko Noda publicly announced as policy a plan to increase the national consumption tax. A week later 37 members including Aoki and Ozawa were officially expelled from the DPJ for voting against the tax bills. Aoki resigned from the role of Committee Chairperson on 10 July and the next day became one of the founding members of Ozawa's new People's Life First Party, which merged with other minor parties in November 2012 to form the Tomorrow Party of Japan.

In the December 2012 general election which removed the DPJ from power, Aoki contested the Tokyo 12th district as a Tomorrow Party candidate, losing to Ota by 47,000 votes. In the Tokyo proportional representation block, the Tomorrow Party received 6.9% of the vote, granting the party one of 17 seats in the block. As Aoki's defeat was the smallest suffered by the Tomorrow Party's 17 candidates in Tokyo, Aoki received the block seat and remained in the House of Representatives. The party's poor showing in the election led to the party's dissolution shortly after, and Aoki was one of fifteen Tomorrow Party Diet members who joined Ozawa in his new party, the People's Life Party. As a People's Life Party member Aoki again served in the House of Representatives' Committee on Education, Culture and Science, the Special Committee on Consumer Affairs and the Special Committee on Promotion of Science and Technology, and Innovation.

In the December 2014 general election Aoki ran as a People's Life candidate and finished third in the Tokyo 12th district behind Ota and Japanese Communist Party candidate Saori Ikeuchi. The party received only 2.7% of the vote in the Tokyo proportional representation block, not enough for one of the seventeen seats, meaning Aoki was left without a seat in the Diet for the first time in nine years.

=== Return to House of Councillors (2016–present) ===
In June 2016 Aoki sought a return to the House of Councillors, receiving the People's Life Party's number one ballot spot for the National Block at the July 2016 upper house election. The People's Life Party received 1.9% of the vote in the National Block, entitling the party to one of the 48 seats being contested. Aoki received 68.9% of the votes cast for the party's five candidates, meaning she was awarded the party's seat.
