= Akihiro Ota =

Japanese politician (born 1945)

- 太田 昭宏
- Official portrait, 2012

Minister of Land, Infrastructure, Transport and Tourism
- In office 26 December 2012 – 7 October 2015
- Prime Minister: Shinzo Abe
- Preceded by: Yuichiro Hata
- Succeeded by: Keiichi Ishii

Chief Representative of New Komeito
- In office 30 September 2006 – 8 September 2009
- Preceded by: Takenori Kanzaki
- Succeeded by: Natsuo Yamaguchi

Member of the House of Representatives
- In office 19 December 2012 – 14 October 2021
- Preceded by: Ai Aoki
- Succeeded by: Mitsunari Okamoto
- Constituency: Tokyo 12th
- In office 18 July 1993 – 21 September 2009
- Preceded by: Iwao Nakamura
- Succeeded by: Ai Aoki
- Constituency: Tokyo 9th (1993–1996); Tokyo PR (1996–2003); Tokyo 12th (2003–2009)

Personal details
- Born: 6 October 1945 (age 81) Shinshiro, Aichi, Japan
- Party: Komeito (since 1998)
- Other political affiliations: CGP (1990–1994); NFP (1994–1998)
- Education: Kyoto University

Akihiro Ota (太田 昭宏, Ōta Akihiro; born 6 October 1945) is a Japanese politician of the Komeito Party and a former member of the House of Representatives in the National Diet. Ota represented three districts within the Tokyo metropolis since he first entered the Diet in 1993. He served as chief representative of the Komeito Party from 2006 until the general election in September 2009, at which time he lost his seat in the Diet. Upon his return to the House in December 2012, Ota was appointed as the Minister of Land, Infrastructure, Transport and Tourism, a post he held until October 2015.

Ota has been involved with Komeito and the Soka Gakkai movement since graduation from university and was called "Komeito's prince" earlier in his career.

== Early life and career ==
Ota was born in Shinshiro, Aichi Prefecture and grew up in the neighbouring city of Toyohashi, graduating from Seiryo Junior High School and Jishukan High School within the city. Ota attended Kyoto University and received a Bachelor of Engineering degree in Civil Engineering in 1968 and a Master of Engineering degree in 1971. Whilst studying at Kyoto University Ota was captain of the school's sumo club.

In April 1971 Ota was employed in the newspaper office of the Komeito Party, a political party affiliated with the Soka Gakkai. As a journalist for the Komei Shimbun, Ota was responsible for reporting political affairs in the National Diet and was also an editorial writer. Ota stayed with the paper for 18 months, after which he continued to progress through the elite course of the Soka Gakkai organization, serving as head of their youth wing in 1982 and earning the nickname "the Prince of Komeito".

== Political career ==
=== Early career (1990–2003) ===
Ota first contested for a seat in the House of Representatives at the 1990 general election. He contested the former Tokyo 8th district, finishing fourth in the race for three seats, 5,199 votes behind the Japanese Communist Party candidate Mitsuhiro Kaneko. At the 1993 general election the 8th district's representation was reduced to two members and Ota switched to the three-member Tokyo 9th district, seeking to replace the retiring Komeito member Iwao Nakamura. He received 18.4% of the vote (75358 votes), the most out of the ten candidates in the race.

1994 electoral reform saw the dissolution of Tokyo's eleven multi-member districts, which were replaced with 25 single-member districts plus a 19-member proportional representation (PR) block representing the entire metropolis. The majority of the area covered by the 9th district that Ota represented became the Tokyo 11th district, whilst the remaining portion became part of the Tokyo 12th district. In December 1994 the Komeito Party dissolved and Ota joined the New Frontier Party, becoming a deputy secretary-general of the party in the same year. Ota contested the first election under the new system of districts in August 1996, retaining his seat in the Diet as one of 5 successful New Frontier candidates in the Tokyo PR block, where the party received 24.6% of the vote.

In 1998 the New Frontier Party dissolved and Komeito reformed; Ota was chosen as the reformed party's secretary-general. In the June 2000 general election Ota was Komeito's number one candidate in the Tokyo PR block and the party received 12.7% of the vote. After the election he was selected as chairman of the party's Diet Affairs Committee.

=== Komeito party leadership and loss (2003–2009) ===
At the subsequent November 2003 general election Ota switched from the Tokyo PR block to the single-member Tokyo 12th district, which represents Kita Ward and part of Adachi Ward. The district had been represented since its inception by Liberal Democratic Party (JDP) member Eita Yashiro, who swapped with Ota to run as a candidate in the Tokyo PR block. Within Kita Ward, Ota was outvoted by Democratic Party of Japan (DPJ) candidate Yukihisa Fujita 45% to 41%, with the third candidate, Mitsuo Yamakishi of the Japanese Communist Party receiving the remaining 14%. However, in Adachi Ward Ota received 52% of the vote, which was enough for him to defeat Fujita 44.1% to 42.4%. The small margin of defeat allowed Fujita to claim one of the DPJ's seats in the Tokyo PR block.

At the next election in September 2005, Yashiro returned to contest the Tokyo 12th district as an independent candidate after voting against the LDP-Komeito coalition's postal reform bills and resigning from the LDP in protest in July. In a four-candidate contest, Ota retained the seat with 43.2% of the vote, suffering only a slight decrease from 2003. Fujita's vote fell to just 29.1% as Yashiro and the Communist Party candidate Ken Nonoyama took 10.3% and 17.4% respectively. The large margin between Ota and Fujita meant the latter failed to retain his seat in the Tokyo PR block.

In September 2006 Takenori Kanzaki resigned as leader of Komeito, having led the party since its reformation in 1998. In the ensuing party vote Ota was elected unopposed to replace him. Whilst at the helm of the party, Komeito suffered a decline in popularity as the junior coalition partner of the ailing LDP, who had had six different prime ministers during the ten-year period of coalition. This culminated in the coalition suffering a major defeat in the 2009 general election and power transferring to the Democratic Party of Japan. Komeito lost ten seats in the election, including Ota's, who was defeated by House of Councillors member Ai Aoki. Ota was standing as a candidate in his Tokyo 12th district, but was not named as a PR block candidate in the case of being defeated, meaning he was left without a seat in the House after five terms and 16 years. He was replaced as party leader by Natsuo Yamaguchi on 8 September 2009.

=== Return to Diet (2012–2021) ===
Ota returned to the Diet at the 2012 general election, which also returned the LDP-Komeito coalition to power in a landslide victory over the DPJ. Ota defeated Aoki, who had defected from the DPJ to the Tomorrow Party, by more than double, claiming 51.4% of the vote to Aoki's 25.4%, although Aoki managed to win a PR block seat. Following the election Ota became a member of the cabinet for the first time, with Prime Minister Shinzo Abe giving him the position of Minister of Land, Infrastructure, Transport and Tourism. Ota comfortably retained his seat at the 2014 general election, receiving more votes than Aoki and Communist Party candidate Saori Ikeuchi combined. He maintained his role in the ministry until be was replaced by fellow Komeito member Keiichi Ishii in October 2015.

== Political views ==
Ota is a prominent voice within the government for better preparation against large-scale earthquakes. He has been a proponent of quake-proofing schools since entering politics in 1993 and became the chairman of Komeito's committee on disasters in 2004. His appointment to the land, infrastructure, transport and tourism portfolio in 2012 was due to Prime Minister Shinzo Abe agreeing with his views on the necessity for disaster prevention to be incorporated into building projects.

Ota is a member of the Alliance for Promoting the Assessment of a New Constitution, which promotes constitutional revision.

Political offices
Preceded by Yuichiro Hata	Minister of Land, Infrastructure, Transport and Tourism; 2012–2015	Succeeded by Keiichi Ishii
Party political offices
Preceded by Takenori Kanzaki	Chief Representative of New Komeito; 2006–2009	Succeeded by Natsuo Yamaguchi
