= Kiyohiko =

- Gender: Male

Origin
- Origin: Japanese
- Meaning: Different meanings depending on the kanji used

Kiyohiko (written: 清彦, 虚彦 or きよひこ in hiragana) is a masculine Japanese given name. Notable people with the name include:

- Kiyohiko Azuma (東 清彦; born 1968), Japanese manga artist
- Kiyohiko Shibukawa (渋川 清彦; born 1974), Japanese actor
- Kiyohiko Toyama (遠山 清彦; born 1969), Japanese politician
- Kiyohiko Ushihara (牛原 虚彦; 1897–1985), Japanese film director
- Kiyohiko Ozaki (尾崎 紀世彦; 1943–2012), Japanese singer
