= Tokyo 12th district =

Japanese House of Representatives constituency

Tokyo 12th District
- Parliamentary constituency for the Japanese House of Representatives
- Numbered map of inner Tokyo single-member districts
- Prefecture: Tokyo
- Proportional District: Tokyo

Current constituency
- Created: 1994
- Seats: One
- Party: LDP
- Representative: Kei Takagi
- Wards: Kita and parts of Itabashi

Tokyo's 12th district is a single-member constituency of the House of Representatives, the lower house of the national Diet of Japan.

== List of representatives ==
Election	Representative	Party	Notes
1996	Eita Yashiro	Liberal Democratic	
2000	Eita Yashiro	Liberal Democratic	
2003	Akihiro Ota	Komeito	
2005	Akihiro Ota	Komeito	
2009	Ai Aoki	Democratic	
2009	Ai Aoki	People's Life First	
2009	Ai Aoki	Tomorrow	
2012	Akihiro Ota	Komeito	
2014	Akihiro Ota	Komeito	
2017	Akihiro Ota	Komeito	
2021	Mitsunari Okamoto	Komeito	Moved to the Tokyo 29th district
2024	Kei Takagi	Liberal Democratic	
2026	Kei Takagi	Liberal Democratic	

== Election results ==
2026
Party	Candidate	Votes	%	±%
LDP	Kei Takagi	78,774	35.0	▲1.7
Centrist Reform	Shōta Nakahara	44,134	19.6	
Ishin	Tsukasa Abe (elected in Tokyo PR block)	33,100	14.7	▼10.5
DPP	Yūki Kusumi	30,913	13.7	▼7.8
JCP	Seiko Tahara	20,616	9.2	▼10.8
Sanseitō	Yūko Kuroishi	17,320	7.7	
Registered electors		378,383		
Turnout			60.54	▲3.45
LDP hold				

2024
Party	Candidate	Votes	%	±%
LDP	Kei Takagi	68,878	33.3	
Ishin	Tsukasa Abe (elected in Tokyo PR block)	52,233	25.2	▼6.5
DPP	Toshiaki Ookuma	44,524	21.5	
JCP	Seiko Tahara	41,504	20.0	▼8.4
Registered electors		378,204		
Turnout			57.09	▼0.36

2021
Party	Candidate	Votes	%	±%
Komeito (endorsed by LDP)	Mitsunari Okamoto (PR seat incumbent)	101,020	39.88	
Innovation	Tsukasa Abe (elected in Tokyo PR block)	80,323	31.71	New
Communist	Saori Ikeuchi	71,948	28.41	
Majority		20,697	8.17	
Registered electors		462,732		
Turnout			57.45	▲4.98
Komeito hold				

2017
Party	Candidate	Votes	%	±%
Komeito (endorsed by LDP)	Akihiro Ota (incumbent)	112,597	51.64	
Communist	Saori Ikeuchi (PR seat incumbent)	83,544	38.32	
Assembly for Zero Parliamentary Compensation	Masaru Nakamura	21,892	10.04	New
Majority		29,053	13.32	
Registered electors		460,263		
Turnout			52.47	▼3.35
Komeito hold				

2014
Party	Candidate	Votes	%	±%
Komeito (endorsed by LDP)	Akihiro Ota (incumbent)	88,499	41.64	
Communist	Saori Ikeuchi (won PR seat)	44,721	21.04	
People's Life	Ai Aoki (PR seat incumbent)	40,067	18.85	New
Future Generations	Toshio Tamogami	39,233	18.46	New
Majority		43,778	20.60	
Registered electors		398,205		
Turnout			56.04	▼6.94
Komeito hold				

2012
Party	Candidate	Votes	%	±%
Komeito (endorsed by LDP)	Akihiro Ota	114,052	51.43	
Tomorrow (endorsed by Daichi)	Ai Aoki (incumbent) (won PR seat)	56,432	25.45	New
Communist	Saori Ikeuchi	41,934	18.91	
Happiness Realization	Masami Hattori	9,359	4.22	
Majority		57,620	25.98	
Registered electors		394,907		
Turnout			62.98	▼6.08
Komeito gain from Tomorrow				

2009
Party	Candidate	Votes	%	±%
Democratic (endorsed by PNP)	Ai Aoki	118,753	45.20	
Komeito (endorsed by LDP)	Akihiro Ota (incumbent)	108,679	41.37	
Communist	Saori Ikeuchi	31,475	11.98	
Happiness Realization	Hideyuki Yokuni	3,813	1.45	New
Majority		10,074	3.83	
Registered electors		393,158		
Turnout			69.06	▲1.26
Democratic gain from Komeito				

2005
Party	Candidate	Votes	%	±%
Komeito	Akihiro Ota (incumbent)	109,636	43.18	
Democratic	Yukihisa Fujita (PR seat incumbent)	73,943	29.12	
Independent	Eita Yashiro (PR seat incumbent)	44,279	17.44	New
Communist	Ken Nonoyama	26,068	10.27	
Majority		35,693	14.06	
Turnout			67.80	
Komeito hold				

2003
Party	Candidate	Votes	%	±%
Komeito	Akihiro Ota (PR seat incumbent)	98,700	44.05	New
Democratic	Yukihisa Fujita (won PR seat)	95,110	42.45	
Communist	Mitsuo Yamagishi	30,251	13.50	
Majority		3,590	1.60	
Turnout				
Komeito gain from LDP				

2000
Party	Candidate	Votes	%	±%
Liberal Democratic	Eita Yashiro (incumbent)	90,208	40.73	
Democratic	Yukihisa Fujita (PR seat incumbent)	64,913	29.31	New
Communist	Mitsuo Yamagishi	45,482	20.53	
Liberal League	Shinichiro Kurimoto (Tokyo 3rd incumbent)	20,902	9.44	New
Majority		25,295	11.42	
Turnout				
LDP hold				

1996
Party	Candidate	Votes	%	±%
Liberal Democratic	Eita Yashiro	61,461	28.41	New
New Frontier	Tamaki Sawa	60,289	27.87	New
Communist	Kohei Īda	45,858	21.20	New
Democratic	Muneharu Wada	38,785	17.93	New
Independent	Kennei Yasuda	5,501	2.54	New
New Socialist	Eiko Tomiyama	4,456	2.06	New
Majority		1,172	0.54	
Turnout				
LDP win (new seat)				
