= Komei Shimbun =

Japanese daily newspaper

- Type: Daily newspaper
- Owner: Komeito
- Founded: 2 April 1962
- Political alignment: Centre
- Language: Japanese
- City: Tokyo
- Country: Japan

Komei Shimbun (公明新聞; lit. 'Clean Government Newspaper') is a Japanese-language daily newspaper which is the official organ of Komeito, a Buddhist political party in Japan. The paper has been in circulation since 1962.

== History and profile ==
Komei Shimbun was started by the Komeito party, and the first issue appeared on 2 April 1962. The same year the party also launched a monthly political magazine, Komei (Japanese: Clean Government). The party partly generated its income through the sale of these publications in the late 1960s. The headquarters of Komei Shimbun is in Tokyo.
