= Kiyohiko Toyama =

Japanese politician (born 1969)

- 遠山 清彦
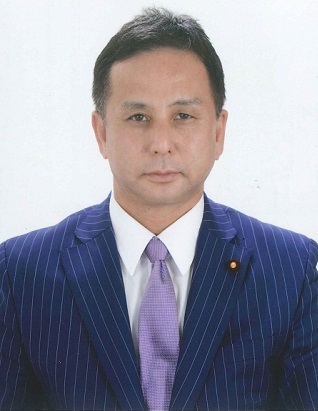
- Official portrait, 2019

Member of the House of Representatives
- In office April 2010 – 1 February 2021
- Preceded by: Takenori Kanzaki
- Succeeded by: Nobuhiro Yoshida
- Constituency: Kyushu PR

Member of the House of Councillors
- In office 29 July 2001 – 2 September 2008
- Preceded by: Multi-member district
- Succeeded by: Shōzō Kusakawa
- Constituency: National PR

Personal details
- Born: 5 June 1969 (age 57) Chiba City, Chiba, Japan
- Party: Independent (since 2022)
- Other political affiliations: Komeito (2001–2022)
- Education: Sōka University; University of Bradford

Kiyohiko Toyama (遠山 清彦, Tōyama Kiyohiko; born 5 June 1969) is a former Japanese politician of the New Komeito Party, who served as a member of the House of Councillors and the House of Representatives in the Diet (national legislature). A native of Chiba, Chiba, he graduated from Sōka University and received a Ph.D. in the study of peace from University of Bradford in the United Kingdom. He was elected to the House of Councillors for the first time in 2001. Toyama retired on 1 February 2021, after being accused of misconduct.
