= Yoshihiro Okumura =

Yoshihiro Okumura may refer to:

- Yoshihiro Okumura (swimmer)
- Yoshihiro Okumura (politician)
