= Takenori Kanzaki =

Japanese politician

- 神崎 武法
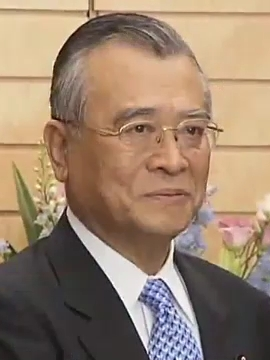
- Kanzaki in 2006

Chief Representative of New Komeito
- In office 7 November 1998 – 30 September 2006
- Preceded by: Position established
- Succeeded by: Akihiro Ota

Minister of Posts and Telecommunications
- In office 9 August 1993 – 28 April 1994
- Prime Minister: Morihiro Hosokawa
- Preceded by: Kiichi Miyazawa
- Succeeded by: Katsuyuki Hikasa

Member of the House of Representatives
- In office 18 December 1983 – 7 April 2010
- Preceded by: Shōji Tanaka
- Succeeded by: Kiyohiko Toyama
- Constituency: Fukuoka 1st (1983–1996); Kyushu PR (1996–2010)

Personal details
- Born: 15 July 1943 (age 83) Tianjin, China
- Party: Komeito
- Other political affiliations: CGP (1983–1994); NFP (1994–1998)
- Education: University of Tokyo

Takenori Kanzaki (神崎 武法, Kanzaki Takenori; born 15 July 1943) is a Japanese politician who served in the House of Representatives as a member of the Komeito Party. He was born in Tianjin, China during the time part of China was under Japanese occupation. A graduate of the University of Tokyo, he was elected to the House of Representatives for the first time in 1983. From August 1993 to April 1994, he served as Minister of Posts and Telecommunications in Morihiro Hosokawa's cabinet.

Kanzaki was the Komeito's leader when the party entered into the coalition in October 1999 with the Liberal Democratic Party which it still maintains to this day. Kanzaki was a noted critic of Prime Minister Yoshirō Mori. Around the time some members of the LDP were voicing opposition to a local referendum which expressed opposition to a proposed dam project along the Yoshino River, Kanzaki insisted that the voters' decision should be respected fully. In 2001, he stated his support for allowing married couples to retain separate surnames.

He stepped down as party leader in 2006 and became an advisor instead. Although Komeito suffered a heavy blow in the 2009 general election along with its coalition partner, Kanzaki was able to secure a position in the Diet thanks to the Kyushu PR block results. He retired from the Diet in 2010 due to kidney failure, but remained a permanent advisor to his party.

House of Representatives (Japan)
New title Introduction of proportional voting	Representative for the Kyūshū proportional representation block 1996–2010; Served alongside: 20 others	Succeeded by Kiyohiko Tōyama (Kōmeitō list replacement)
Preceded by Taku Yamasaki; Yanosuke Narazaki...	Representative for Fukuoka 1st district 1983–1996; Served alongside: Taku Yamasaki, Seiichi Ōta, Ryū Matsumoto, ...	District eliminated
Political offices
Preceded by Kiichi Miyazawa	Minister of Posts and Telecommunications; 1993–1994	Succeeded by Katsuyuki Hikasa
Party political offices
Preceded by Kōzō Watanabe	Executive Council Chairman of the New Frontier Party; 1996–1997	Party dissolved
New political party	President of Shintō Heiwa ("New Peace Party"); 1998	Merged into Kōmeitō
New political party	Chief Representative of New Komeito; 1998–2006	Succeeded by Akihiro Ōta
