= Tokyo 29th district =

Electoral district in Tokyo, Japan

Tokyo 29th District
- 東京都第29区
- Parliamentary constituency for the Japanese House of Representatives
- Electorate: 355,778 (as of September 2022)

Current constituency
- Created: 2022
- Seats: One
- Party: LDP
- Representative: Kōsuke Nagasawa
- Created from: Parts of: Tokyo 12th; Tokyo 13th; Tokyo 14th

Tokyo 29th district (東京都第29区, Tokyo-to dai-nijukyu-ku) is an electoral district of the Japanese House of Representatives. The district was created as part of the 2022 reapportionment that added five new districts to Tokyo. Mitsunari Okamoto, the incumbent of the 12th district and the policy chief of the Komeito party, became the first representative as a result of the 2024 general election.

== Areas covered ==
=== Current district ===
As of 11 January 2023, the areas covered by this district are as follows:

- Arakawa
- Adachi (Tobu Isesaki Line, Kanjo Route 7, west of Otakebashi Street)
  - Iko 1-5, Iko Honmachi 1-2, Iriya 1-9, Iriya, Ougi 1-3, Kono 1-2, Kodai 1-2, Kaga 1-2, Kurihara 3- 4, Kohoku 1-7, Furjiya 1-2, Furujiya Honcho 1-4, Saranuma 1-3, Shikahama 1-8, Nitta 1-3, Tsubaki 1-2, Toneri 1-6, Toneri Park, Toneri-cho, Nishiarai 1-7, Nishiarai Sakaecho 3, Nishiarai Honcho 1-5, Nishiike 1-4, Nishiike-cho, Nishitakenotsuka 1-2, Higashiiko 1-4, Horinouchi 1-2, Miyagi 1-2, Motoki 1-2, Motoki Higashimachi, Motoki Nishimachi, Motoki Minamimachi, Motoki Kitamachi, Yazaike 1-3

Before the creation of this district, Arakawa was a part of the 14th district, and the west part of Adachi was split between the 12th and 13th districts.

== Elected representatives ==
Representatives	Party	Years served	Notes
Mitsunari Okamoto	Komeito	2024 – 2026	Moved from the 12th district
Kōsuke Nagasawa	LDP	2026 –	

== Election results ==
2026
Party	Candidate	Votes	%	±%
LDP	Kōsuke Nagasawa	80,538	41.4	
Centrist Reform	Taketsuka Kimura	45,358	23.3	▼3.2
DPP	Yoshikazu Tarui	26,692	13.7	▼3.6
CPJ	Eiji Kosaka	14.101	7.2	
Sanseitō	Tetsurō Harikawa	14.071	7.2	
JCP	Kenichi Suzuki	13,976	7.2	▼2.4
Registered electors		356,570		
Turnout			55.68	▲2.67
LDP gain from Komeito				

2024
Party	Candidate	Votes	%	±%
Komeito	Mitsunari Okamoto	60,100	33.2	
CDP	Taketsuka Kimura	47,996	26.5	
DPP	Yoshikazu Tarui	31,367	17.3	
Sanseitō	Yuki Ebisawa	24,107	13.3	
JCP	Kenichi Suzuki	17,325	9.6	
Turnout			53.01	
