= Kei Takagi =

Japanese politician

- 髙木 啓
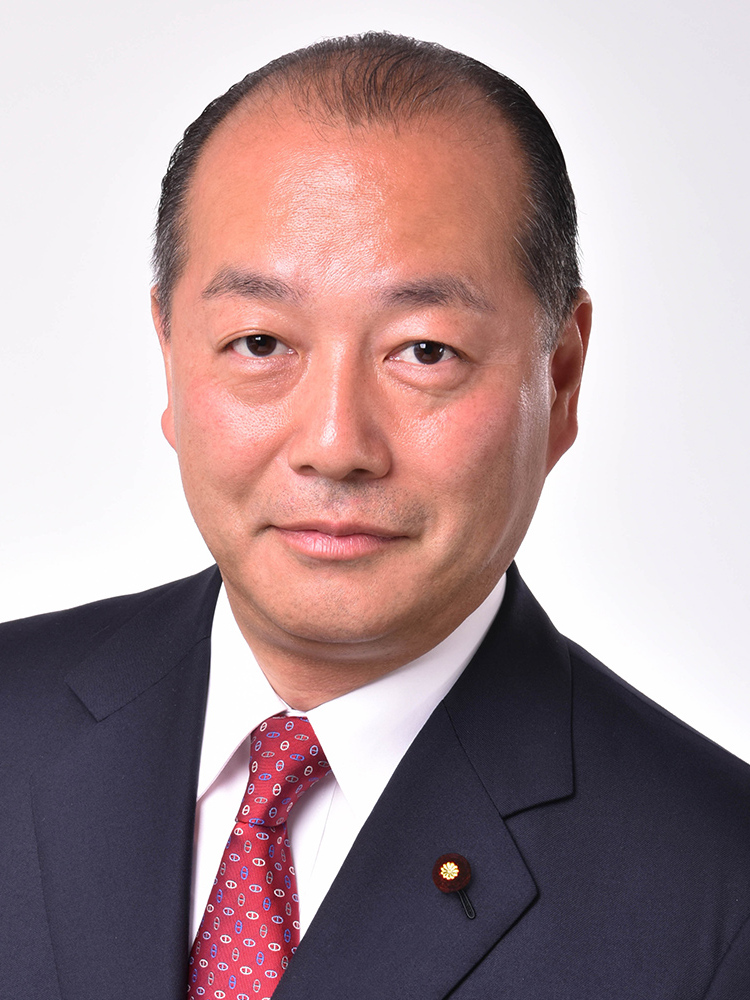
- Official portrait, 2022

Member of the House of Representatives,
- Incumbent
- Assumed office 22 October 2017
- Preceded by: Multi-member district
- Constituency: Tokyo PR (2017–2024); Tokyo 12th (2024–present)

Member of the Tokyo Metropolitan Assembly
- In office 23 July 2005 – 22 July 2017
- Constituency: Kita Ward

Member of the Kita City Council
- In office 1991–2001

Personal details
- Born: 16 March 1965 (age 61) Kita, Tokyo, Japan
- Party: Liberal Democratic
- Other political affiliations: Democratic Socialist

Kei Takagi is a Japanese politician who is a member of the House of Representatives of Japan. As of November 2026 he was State Minister of Economy, Trade and Industry in METI.

== Biography ==
He was elected in 2017, and re-elected in 2021. He was selected as a Vice-Minister for Foreign Affairs in the second Kashida cabinet.
