= Tsukasa Abe =

Japanese politician (born 1982)

- 阿部 司
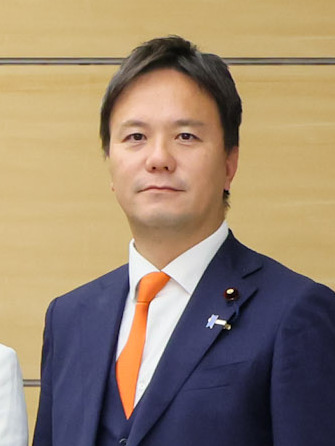
- Abe in 2025

Member of the House of Representatives
- Incumbent
- Assumed office 5 November 2021
- Constituency: Tokyo PR

Personal details
- Born: 18 June 1982 (age 44) Ōta, Tokyo, Japan
- Party: Innovation
- Education: Waseda University

Tsukasa Abe (阿部司, Abe Tsukasa; born 18 June 1982) is a Japanese politician serving as a member of the House of Representatives since 2021. He has served as chairman of the Japan Innovation Party since 2024.
