= Saori Ikeuchi =

Japanese politician

- 池内 沙織

Member of the House of Representatives
- In office 19 December 2014 – 28 September 2017
- Constituency: Tokyo PR

Personal details
- Born: 15 September 1982 (age 43) Matsuyama, Ehime, Japan
- Party: Communist
- Education: Chuo University

Saori Ikeuchi (池内 さおり; born September 15, 1982) is a member of the Japanese Communist Party, serving in the House of Representatives. She is one of the representatives representing the Tokyo proportional representation block. Ikeuchi believes that the government should do more to protect the rights of LGBT people.
