= Mitsunari Okamoto =

Japanese politician (born 1965)

- 岡本 三成
- Okamoto in 2025

Chief Representative of Komeito
- Incumbent
- Assumed office 3 October 2026
- Preceded by: Toshiko Takeya

Member of the House of Representatives
- Incumbent
- Assumed office 21 December 2012
- Preceded by: Multi-member district
- Constituency: Northern Kanto PR (2012–2021); Tokyo 12th (2021–2024); Tokyo 29th (2024–2026); Tokyo PR (2026–present)

Personal details
- Born: 5 May 1965 (age 61) Tosu, Saga, Japan
- Party: Komeito (2011–2026; since 2026)
- Other political affiliations: CRA (2026)
- Education: Sōka University; Northwestern University
- Website: 衆議院議員 岡本みつなり 公式ホームページ

Mitsunari Okamoto (born 5 May 1965) is a Japanese politician from Komeito who represents Tokyo's 29th district in the House of Representatives. Okamoto was vice minister in the Finance Ministry in the Second Kishida Cabinet. Following the 2024 Japanese general election he became the chairman of the Komeito Policy Research Council.
