= Komeito =

Political party in Japan

Komeito 公明党
- Leader: Mitsunari Okamoto
- Secretary-General: Makoto Nishida
- Founded: 7 November 1998; 28 years ago
- Merger of: Kōmeitō (1962); New Peace Party; Reform Club
- Headquarters: 17 Minamimoto-machi, Shinjuku, Tokyo 160-0012
- Newspaper: Komei Shimbun
- Membership (2024): 450,000
- Ideology: Buddhist democracy
- Political position: Centre
- Religion: Buddhism (Soka Gakkai) (de facto)
- National affiliation: LDP–Komeito coalition (1999–2025); Centrist Reform Alliance (2026)
- Colors: Pink; Blue (Note: as New Komeito) (Note: still used on English website)
- Slogan: 大衆と共に (Note: Taishū to tomo ni) ('With the Public')
- Senators: 21 / 248
- Representatives: 28 / 465
- Prefectural assembly members: 208 / 2,614
- Municipal assembly members: 2,647 / 28,940

Website
- Japanese; www.komei.or.jp; English; www.komei.or.jp/en/
- Politics of Japan; Political parties; Elections; A: Komeito is also sometimes described as centre-left or right-wing.

Komeito (Japanese: 公明党, Hepburn: Kōmeitō), formerly New Komeito (NKP) and commonly referred to as simply Komei, is a political party in Japan affiliated with the Soka Gakkai religious movement. It is generally considered centrist. From 1999 to 2009 and from 2012 to 2025, it served in government as the junior coalition partner of the Liberal Democratic Party (LDP).

Komeito was founded by the leader of Soka Gakkai, Daisaku Ikeda, in 1964. In 1993 and 1994, Komeito joined the non-LDP governments of Morihiro Hosokawa and Tsutomu Hata. With the collapse of the Hata government in 1994, Komeito split into the New Kōmei Party and Kōmei; the New Kōmei Party merged with other smaller opposition parties to establish the New Frontier Party (NFP). After the dissolution of the NFP in 1997, some former New Kōmei Party members established the New Peace Party, which merged with Kōmei in 1998 to establish the New Komeito. In 1999, the party entered into a coalition with LDP, serving in the government until the coalition lost power in 2009. In 2012, the coalition regained power. In 2014, the party changed its English name back to Komeito. In 2025, Komeito formally withdrew from the ruling coalition, ending its 26-year alliance with the LDP. In 2026, Komeito merged with the Constitutional Democratic Party in the House of Representatives to form the Centrist Reform Alliance in advance of the 2026 general election; however the party still caucuses as Komeito in the House of Councillors and in local elections.

A self-proclaimed party of "humanitarian socialism", Komeito has been described as being closely affiliated with Soka Gakkai. During its alliance with the LDP, Komeito acted as a moderating force over security and military policies. In foreign policy, the party advocates for a more pacifist diplomacy and closer relations with China. Mitsunari Okamoto has been the president of the party since 3 October 2026.

== History ==
=== Opposition before 1993 ===
Komeito began as the Political Federation for Clean Government in 1961, but held its inaugural convention as Komeito on 17 November 1964, when it was founded by the leader of Soka Gakkai, Daisaku Ikeda. The three characters 公明党 have the approximate meanings of "public/government" (公 kō), "light/brightness" (明 mei), and "political party" (党 tō). The combination "kōmei" (公明) is usually taken to mean "justice". Komeito's predecessor party was formed in 1962, but it had begun in 1954 as the Kōmei Political League. It lasted until it merged with the NKP in 1998.

In 1957, a group of Young Men's Division members campaigning for a Soka Gakkai candidate in an Osaka Upper House by-election were arrested for distributing money, cigarettes, and caramels at supporters' residences, in violation of election law, and on July 3 of that year, at the beginning of an event memorialized as the "Osaka Incident", Daisaku Ikeda was arrested in Osaka. He was taken into custody in his capacity as Soka Gakkai's Youth Division Chief of Staff for overseeing activities that constituted violations of election law. He spent two weeks in jail and appeared in court forty-eight times before he was cleared of all charges in January 1962.

In 1968, fourteen Soka Gakkai members were convicted of forging absentee ballots in Shinjuku, and eight were sentenced to prison for electoral fraud. In the 1960s it was widely criticized for violating the separation of church and state, and in February 1970 all three major Japanese newspapers printed editorials demanding that the party reorganize. It eventually broke apart based on promises to segregate from Soka Gakkai. In the 1980s, Shimbun Akahata discovered that many Soka Gakkai members were rewarding acquaintances with presents in return for Komeito votes and that Okinawa residents had changed their addresses to elect Komeito politicians.

=== Anti-LDP coalition government: 1993–1994 ===
Kōmeitō joined the Hosokawa and Hata anti-LDP coalition cabinets in 1993 and 1994. After the collapse of the anti-LDP and anti-JCP governments (非自民・非共産連立政権) and the electoral and campaign finance reforms of 1994, the Kōmeitō split in December 1994: The "New Kōmei Party" (公明新党, Kōmei Shintō) joined the New Frontier Party (NFP) a few days later in an attempt to unify the splintered opposition.

The other group, Kōmei (公明), continued to exist as a separate party. After the dissolution of the NFP in December 1997, former Kōmeitō members from the NFP founded two new groups: the "New Peace Party" (新党平和, Shintō Heiwa) and the "Dawn Club" (黎明クラブ, Reimei Club) in the House of Councillors, but some ex-Kōmeitō politicians such as Shōzō Azuma followed Ichirō Ozawa into the Liberal Party. The Reimei Club merged into the New Peace Party a few weeks later in January 1998. Finally, in November 1998, Kōmei and New Peace Party merged to re-establish Kōmeitō (referred to in English now as "New Komeito" – the party's name is just Kōmeitō as before the 1994 split). The Japan Echo alleged in 1999 that Soka Gakkai distributed fliers to local branches describing how to abuse the jūminhyō residence registration system in order to generate a large number of votes for Komeito candidates in specific districts.

=== Coalition with the Liberal Democratic Party: 1999–2025 ===
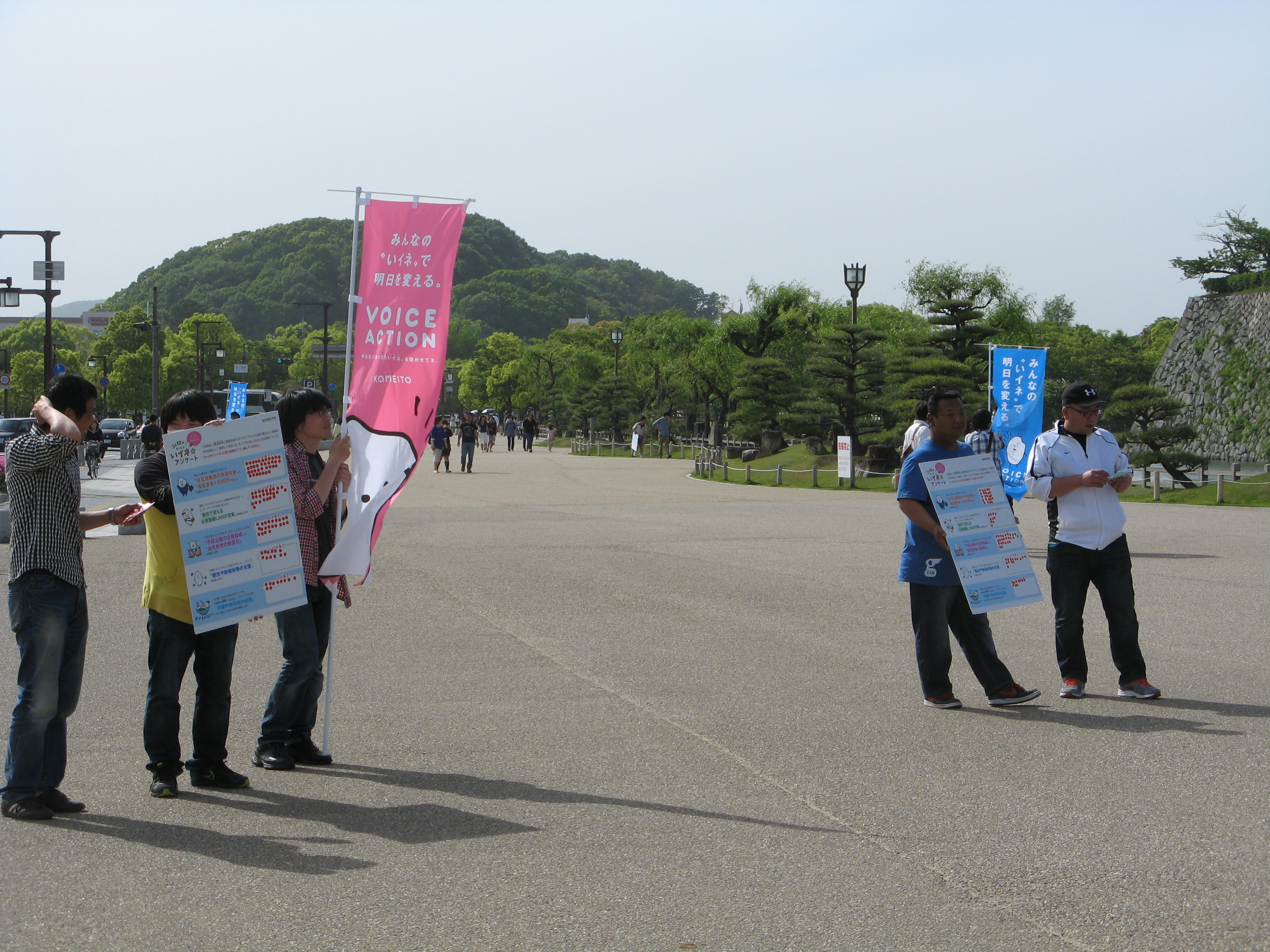
Komeito activists canvassing in front of Himeji Castle

The current more moderate and centrist party was formed in 1998, in a merger of Kōmei and the New Peace Party. Since then it has joined coalition with the ruling Liberal Democratic Party (LDP), which needs Komeito to maintain a majority in the Diet (especially in the House of Councillors which the LDP lost majority since 1989), and did well in the 2000 and 2001 parliamentary elections. The LDP-Liberal coalition expanded to include the New Komeito Party in October 1999. New Komeito has been (and continues to be) a coalition partner in the Government of Japan since 1999 (excluding 2009–2011 when the Democratic Party of Japan was in power). As such, New Komeito supported a (temporary) change to Japan's "no-war constitution" in order for Japan to deploy troops in support of the 2003 invasion of Iraq.

In the 2003 Japanese general election and 2004 Japanese House of Councillors election, the NKP did well, thanks to an extremely committed and well-organized voter base coming from Soka Gakkai. The party shares its support base with the LDP, made up of white-collar bureaucrats and rural populations, but also gained support from religious leaders. On 27 July 2005, NKP's Secretary-General said that his party would consider forming a coalition government with the Democratic Party of Japan (DPJ) if the DPJ gained a majority in the House of Representatives. On 8 August 2005, then-Prime Minister and the president of LDP Junichiro Koizumi dissolved the Lower House and called for a general election, due to the rejection on some of the members of LDP for efforts to privatize Japan Post. The incumbent LDP-New Komeito coalition won a large majority in the 2005 general election. Natsuo Yamaguchi became the party's leader on 8 September 2009 after the party and their coalition partner LDP suffered a major defeat in the 2009 general election, become part of the opposition for the first time since 1999. New Komeito lost ten seats, including that of party leader Akihiro Ota and general secretary Kazuo Kitagawa. On 8 September 2009, Yamaguchi replaced Ota as president of New Komeito.

In the 2012 Japanese general election, the LDP/Komeito coalition secured a supermajority and came back into government. The former party chief Akihiro Ota (Ohta) is currently Minister of Land, Infrastructure, Transport and Tourism. The party also gained seats in the general election in 2014. In September 2014 the party changed its English name from New Komeito back to Komeito. In July 2015, Komeito backed Prime Minister Shinzo Abe's push to revise the Constitution through the Legislation for Peace and Security in order to "give Japan's military limited powers to fight in foreign conflicts. The principal aims of the bills were to allow Japan's Self-Defense Forces to come to the aid of allied nations under attack (even if Japan itself was not), to expand their scope to support international peacekeeping operations, and to allow for Japan to take on a greater share of security responsibilities as part of the US-Japan Alliance. On March 11, 2019, a project team of Komeito submitted proposals to Foreign Minister Taro Kono for an international agreement to regulate robotic weapons, calling on Japan to build global consensus for a "political declaration or a code of conduct, within the framework of the Convention on Certain Conventional Weapons".

=== In opposition: 2025–present ===
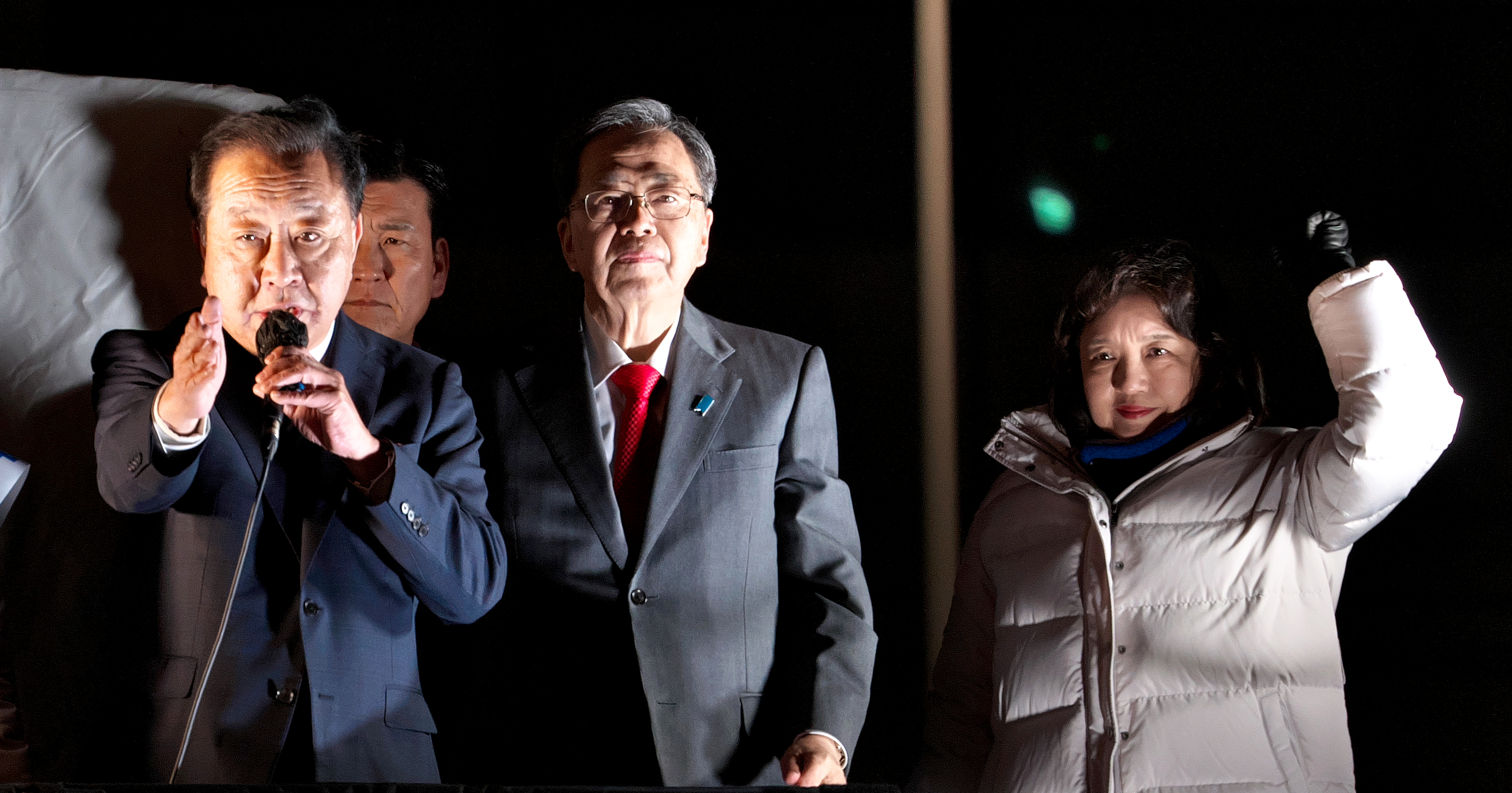
Yoshihiko Noda and Tetsuo Saito, Co-Leaders of the Centrist Reform Alliance, and Toshiko Takeya, Chief Representative of Komeito, gave a street speech for the general election (February 7, 2026)

On October 10, 2025, Komeito chief representative Tetsuo Saito announced that it would leave the ruling coalition, over disagreements with new LDP president Sanae Takaichi. On 15 January 2026, Constitutional Democratic Party of Japan President Yoshihiko Noda announced that the party had agreed to merge with Komeito in the lower-house to form a new political party called Centrist Reform Alliance. In the 2026 election, the CRA lost a significant number of seats, winning only 49 of them, while the LDP gained seats and secured more than a two-thirds majority of the lower house on its own. 21 CDP-affiliated candidates won seats, down from 144 before, while 28 Komeito-affiliated candidates won seats, up from 21 before.

In the 2026 Japanese local elections, the CDP and Komeito will field their own candidates instead of a unified CRA banner. In addition, the parties have not merged in the House of Councillors.

== Ideology and policies ==
A self-proclaimed party of "humanitarian socialism", Komeito's declared mission is to pioneer "people-centered politics, a politics based on a humanitarianism, that treats human life with the utmost respect and care". Religious scholar and political analyst Masaru Satō explains that in postwar Japan there were two major parties, the Liberal Democratic Party representing financial interests and large corporations and the Japan Socialist Party largely advocating the interests of trade unions and the working class. There was no single party that represented people who belonged to neither, such as shop owners and housewives, among others. Komeito was thus able to capture the support of this constituency.

=== Relationship with Soka Gakkai ===
Komeito regards the Soka Gakkai as a "major electoral constituency", having formally separated from the religious group and revised both its platform and regulations in 1970 to reflect a "secular orientation". Observers continue to describe Komeito as the Soka Gakkai's "political arm", and critics contend the relationship violates the separation of religion and politics enshrined in Article 20 of the Japanese Constitution. The leadership and financing of the two groups are currently said to be independent. Both groups report having occasional liaison meetings, characterizing them as informational and "open to the media". Numerous Japanese religious groups have established political parties in Japan, but statistics scholar Petter Lindgren states: "None have, however, been more successful than Soka Gakkai."

=== Domestic policy ===
Domestically, the party proposals include reduction of the central government and bureaucracy, increased transparency in public affairs, and increased local (prefectural) autonomy with the private sector playing an increased role. Komeito also supports reducing the consumption tax rate, reducing school fees and offering child allowances. In accordance with its public affairs transparency platform, it was reported that since September 2016, the Komeito conducted independent analyses for possible environmental contamination of the proposed Toyosu market site. The Komeito officially raised its environmental concerns later regarding Toyosu market during the 5 October 2016 Tokyo Metropolitan Assembly Session. In response, the newly appointed Tokyo Governor, Yuriko Koike, cited possible disciplinary action towards those responsible for the Toyosu project. Komeito embraces market liberalism to some extent, but it also emphasizes social welfare, and officially puts forward "humanitarian socialism" as its main ideology.

=== Security policy ===
In contrast with the LDP, Komeito has generally been more cautious about efforts to expand the Japan Self-Defense Forces (JSDF). At its founding, the party adhered to absolute pacifism, rejecting both the constitutionality of the JSDF and the military alliance with the US. Softening its views later, Komeito backed LDP proposals, such as a 2004 vote to dispatch the JSDF to support allied operations in Afghanistan and Iraq, and prime minister Shinzo Abe's revision of the security laws to expand military powers through the Legislation for Peace and Security in July 2015, although it did manage to moderate the policy on the latter.

=== Social policy ===
On 24 April 2019, joint task force efforts with its coalition partner resulted in the passing of a bill mandating reparations and having the coalition government issue a formal apology to sterilization victims of the defunct Eugenic Protection Act, thus to advance human rights awareness in the wake of lawsuits related to the history of eugenics in Japan. The party supports the protection and expansion of LGBT rights.

=== Foreign policy ===
With regard to foreign policy, the Komeito wishes to eliminate nuclear arms and Japanese involvement in armed conflict in general. Komeito supports maintaining the Japan's military alliance with the United States. The party promotes closer relations between China and Japan. According to a Foreign Policy article in 2021, "Of all parties in the Diet, Komeito enjoys the strongest and most stable relationship with China." The pro-China policy began in the early 1960s, shortly after the party's formation. Komeito's founding policy platform called for the recognition of the People's Republic of China (PRC). At the time, the Japanese government considered its relationship with China resolved, as it had signed a peace treaty with the Republic of China (ROC). After the end of the Pacific War, Kuomintang leader Chiang Kai-shek advocated a policy of "repay evil with good" (以德報怨) and instructed various parties to ensure the safe return of Japanese soldiers. This was a stark contrast to the Soviet Union's actions, where over 55,000 Japanese are said to have died during their Siberian Internment. Many politicians felt a sense of gratitude for Chiang's actions, and as a result, the Japanese government did not engage with the PRC and the Chinese Communist Party (CCP). To break this impasse, CCP member Liao Chengzhi was tasked with a diplomatic mission to Japan.

Liao's Japanese was nearly indistinguishable from a native speaker, and he had a deep understanding of how to influence the Japanese psyche. His efforts went beyond the ruling LDP and extended to Soka Gakkai, and cultural figures associated with it, such as Sawako Ariyoshi. These efforts bore fruit in 1968, when Soka Gakkai President Daisaku Ikeda read what became known as the "Ikeda Proposal" in front of 20,000 believers. He called on the Japanese government to open dialogue with the Chinese Communist Party and even criticized the United States, stating that China's exclusion from the UN was due to a "clever plot" by America. Komeito's then leader Yoshikatsu Takeiri's negotiations with Chinese Premier Zhou Enlai in the 1970s played a critical role in the eventual normalization of relations between the People's Republic of China and Japan in 1972. The party has advocated for friendlier policies towards China, and has maintained communications with the country even during moments when the relationships between the two countries have been strained. In 2008, when President Hu Jintao visited Japan, he met with Ikeda and praised the "Ikeda Proposal" from 1968.

The party reportedly advocates for improved ties with China and South Korea in light of Japan's historical war crimes in both territories. In 2013, the party's chief representative Natsuo Yamaguchi praised Prime Minister Shinzo Abe's decision not to visit Yasukuni Shrine, where Japanese war criminals are enshrined. On the comfort women issue, in 2016 the party reportedly advocated for removing Yoshitaka Sakurada from a leadership position after Sakurada denied that the women were forced to work.

=== Party organ ===
The party organ of Komeito is the Komei Shinbun. It is published by the Komei Organ Paper Committee, and has also published a regional Hokkaido edition in the past.

== Leadership ==
=== Current leadership ===
Leadership as of 8 February 2026:

| Position | Name |
|---|---|
| Permanent Advisor | Natsuo Yamaguchi |
| Leader | Mitsunari Okamoto |
| Secretary General | Makoto Nishida |
| Chairman of the Policy Research Council | Kōzō Akino |
| Chairman of the Central Executive Committee | Masaaki Taniai |
| Chairman of Caucus in the House of Councillors | Masaaki Taniai |
| Secretary General in the House of Councillors | Hirotaka Ishikawa |
| Chairman of the Diet Affairs Committee | Daisaku Hiraki |
| Chairman of the Election Strategy Committee | Nobuhiro Miura |

== Election results ==
=== House of Representatives ===
House of Representatives
| Election | Leader | No. of candidates | Seats | | | Position | Constituency votes | | PR Block votes | | Status |
| Election | Leader | No. of candidates | No. | ± | Share | Position | No. | Share | No. | Share | Status |
|---|---|---|---|---|---|---|---|---|---|---|---|
Komei era
| 1996 | Komei faction | 51 | 42 / 511 | ▼9 | 8.2% | | see New Frontier Party | | | | Opposition (until 1998) |
| 1996 | Komei faction | 51 | 42 / 511 | ▼9 | 8.2% | | see New Frontier Party | | | | Governing coalition (since 1998) |
New Komeito era
| 2000 | Takenori Kanzaki | 74 | 31 / 480 | ▼11 | 6.4% | ▲3rd | 1,231,753 | 2.02% | 7,762,032 | 12.97% | Governing coalition |
| 2003 | Takenori Kanzaki | 55 | 34 / 480 | ▲3 | 7.0% | 3rd | 886,507 | 1.49% | 8,733,444 | 14.78% | Governing coalition |
| 2005 | Takenori Kanzaki | 52 | 31 / 480 | ▼3 | 6.4% | 3rd | 981,105 | 1.4% | 8,987,620 | 13.3% | Governing coalition |
| 2009 | Akihiro Ota | 51 | 21 / 480 | ▼10 | 4.3% | 3rd | 782,984 | 1.11% | 8,054,007 | 11.45% | Opposition |
| 2012 | Natsuo Yamaguchi | 54 | 31 / 480 | ▲10 | 6.4% | ▼4th | 885,881 | 1.49% | 7,116,474 | 11.90% | Governing coalition |
Komeito era
| 2014 | Natsuo Yamaguchi | 51 | 35 / 475 | ▲4 | 7.3% | 4th | 765,390 | 1.45% | 7,314,236 | 13.71% | Governing coalition |
| 2017 | Natsuo Yamaguchi | 53 | 29 / 465 | ▼6 | 6.2% | 4th | 832,453 | 1.50% | 6,977,712 | 12.51% | Governing coalition |
| 2021 | Natsuo Yamaguchi | 53 | 32 / 465 | ▲3 | 6.8% | 4th | 872,931 | 1.52% | 7,114,282 | 12.38% | Governing coalition |
| 2024 | Keiichi Ishii | 50 | 24 / 465 | ▼8 | 5.2% | ▼6th | 730,401 | 1.35% | 5,964,415 | 10.93% | Governing minority (until 2025) |
| 2024 | Keiichi Ishii | 50 | 24 / 465 | ▼8 | 5.2% | ▼6th | 730,401 | 1.35% | 5,964,415 | 10.93% | Opposition (since 2025) |
Merged into Centrist Reform Alliance

=== House of Councillors ===
House of Councillors
| Election | Leader | Seats | | Nationwide (Note: From 1947 to 1980, 50 members were elected through a nationwide constituency, known as the "national block" (Plurality-at-large voting). It was replaced in 1983 by a proportional representation block with closed lists. In 2001, the PR block was reduced to 48 members with most open lists.) | | Prefecture | | Status |
| Election | Leader | Total (Note: The Upper house is split in two classes, one elected every three years.) | Contested | Number | % | Number | % | Status |
|---|---|---|---|---|---|---|---|---|
Komei era
| 1995 | Tomio Fujii | 11 / 252 | 0 / 126 | Did not participate in election | | | | Minority |
| 1998 | Toshiko Hamayotsu | 22 / 252 | 9 / 126 | 7,748,301 | 13.80% | 1,843,479 | 3.30% | Minority (until 1999) |
| 1998 | Toshiko Hamayotsu | 22 / 252 | 9 / 126 | 7,748,301 | 13.80% | 1,843,479 | 3.30% | Governing majority coalition (since 1999) |
New Komeito era
| 2001 | Takenori Kanzaki | 23 / 247 | 13 / 121 | 8,187,804 | 14.96% | 3,468,664 | 6.38% | Governing majority coalition |
| 2004 | Takenori Kanzaki | 24 / 242 | 11 / 121 | 8,621,265 | 15.41% | 2,161,764 | 3.85% | Governing majority coalition |
| 2007 | Akihiro Ota | 20 / 242 | 9 / 121 | 7,765,329 | 13.18% | 3,534,672 | 5.96% | Governing minority coalition (until 2009) |
| 2007 | Akihiro Ota | 20 / 242 | 9 / 121 | 7,765,329 | 13.18% | 3,534,672 | 5.96% | Minority (since 2009) |
| 2010 | Natsuo Yamaguchi | 19 / 242 | 9 / 121 | 7,639,432 | 13.07% | 2,265,818 | 3.88% | Minority (until 2012) |
| 2010 | Natsuo Yamaguchi | 19 / 242 | 9 / 121 | 7,639,432 | 13.07% | 2,265,818 | 3.88% | Governing minority coalition (since 2012) |
| 2013 | Natsuo Yamaguchi | 20 / 242 | 11 / 121 | 7,568,082 | 14.22% | 2,724,447 | 5.13% | Governing majority coalition |
Komeito era
| 2016 | Natsuo Yamaguchi | 25 / 242 | 14 / 121 | 7,572,960 | 13.52% | 4,263,422 | 7.54% | Governing majority coalition |
| 2019 | Natsuo Yamaguchi | 28 / 245 | 14 / 124 | 6,536,336 | 13.05% | 3,913,359 | 7.77% | Governing majority coalition |
| 2022 | Natsuo Yamaguchi | 27 / 248 | 13 / 125 | 6,181,432 | 11.66% | 3,600,490 | 6.77% | Governing majority coalition |
| 2025 | Tetsuo Saito | 21 / 248 | 8 / 125 | 5,210,569 | 8.80% | 3,175,790 | 5.37% | Governing minority coalition (until 2025) |
| 2025 | Tetsuo Saito | 21 / 248 | 8 / 125 | 5,210,569 | 8.80% | 3,175,790 | 5.37% | Opposition (since 2025) |

== See also ==
- Politics of Japan

== Literature ==
- Ehrhardt, George, Axel Klein, Levi McLaughlin and Steven R. Reed (2014) (Eds.): Kōmeitō – Politics and Religion in Japan. Institute of East Asian Studies, University of California, Berkeley
- Fisker-Nielsen, Anne Mette (2012), Religion and Politics in Contemporary Japan: Soka Gakkai Youth and Komeito, Routledge
