= Tokyo 22nd district =

Electoral district in Tokyo, Japan

Tokyo 22nd District
- 東京都第22区
- Parliamentary constituency for the Japanese House of Representatives
- Prefecture: Tokyo
- Proportional Block: Tokyo
- Electorate: 430,260 (as of 1 September 2022)

Current constituency
- Created: 1994
- Seats: One
- Party: LDP
- Representative: Tatsuya Ito

Tokyo 22nd District (東京都第22区, Tokyo-to dai-junini-ku; or 東京22区, Tokyo nijuni-ku) is an electoral district of the Japanese House of Representatives located in Western Tokyo. The district was created in 1994 as part of the move to single-member constituencies.

== Areas covered ==
=== Current district ===
As of 13 January 2023, the areas covered by this district are as follows:

- Mitaka
- Chōfu
- Komae

As part of the 2022 reapportionments, the remaining sections of Inagi were given to the new 30th district.

=== Areas 2017–2022 ===
From the second redistricting in 2017 until the third redistricting in 2022, the areas covered by this district were as follows:

- Mitaka
- Chōfu
- Komae
- Parts of Inagi
  - Yanoguchi, Higashi Naganuma, Daimura, Hyakumura, Oshidate, Koyodai 1-6

As part of the 2017 redistricting, parts of Inagi city were transferred to the 21st district.

=== Areas 2002–2017 ===
From the first redistricting in 2002 until the second redistricting in 2017, the areas covered by this district were as follows:

- Mitaka
- Chōfu
- Komae
- Inagi

As part of the 2002 redistricting, Fuchū was moved to the 18th district and Mitaka was gained from that same district.

=== Areas from before 2002 ===
From the founding of this district in 1994 until the first redistricting in 2002, the areas covered by this district were as follows:

- Fuchu
- Chōfu
- Komae
- Inagi

== Elected representatives ==
Representative	Party	Years served	Notes
Tatsuya Ito	NFP	1996 – 2000	Joined the LDP and won a seat in the Tokyo PR district
Ikuo Yamahana	DPJ	2000 – 2005	Lost re-election in the 2005 general election
Tatsuya Ito	LDP	2005 – 2009	Lost re-election in the 2009 general election
Ikuo Yamahana	DPJ	2009 – 2012	Lost re-election in the 2012 general election. Won election to the Tokyo PR district in the 2017 general election.
Tatsuya Ito	LDP	2012 – 2024	
Ikuo Yamahana	CDP	2024 – 2026	
Tatsuya Ito	LDP	2026 –	

== Election results ==
‡ - Also ran for the Tokyo PR district

‡‡ - Also ran for and was elected to the Tokyo PR district

2026
Party	Candidate	Votes	%	±%
LDP	Tatsuya Ito^{‡}	132,689	51.5	▲12.5
Centrist Reform	Ikuo Yamahana^{‡}	87,494	33.9	▼6.3
Sanseitō	Mika Suzuki^{‡‡} (won seat in PR)	37,697	14.6	▲4.1
Registered electors		429,768		
Turnout			61.87	▲2.26
LDP gain from Centrist Reform				

2024
Party	Candidate	Votes	%	±%
CDP	Ikuo Yamahana^{‡}	99,790	40.2	▲0.1
LDP	Tatsuya Ito^{‡‡} (won seat in PR)	96,748	39.0	▼7.6
Sanseitō	Mika Suzuki	26,005	10.5	
JCP	Yoshitaka Hirano	25,453	10.3	
Registered electors		428,356		
Turnout			59.61	▼0.40
CDP gain from LDP				

2021
Party	Candidate	Votes	%	±%
LDP	Tatsuya Ito^{‡} (incumbent) (endorsed by Komeito)	131,351	46.9	▲3.5
CDP	Ikuo Yamahana^{‡} (incumbent - Tokyo PR)	112,393	40.1	▲4.3
Reiwa	Mari Kushibuchi^{‡}	31,981	11.4	New
Anti-NHK	Youhei Hasegawa	4,535	1.6	New
Registered electors		478,721		
Turnout		287,281	60.0	▲4.3
LDP hold		Swing	▲3.1	

2017
Party	Candidate	Votes	%	±%
LDP	Tatsuya Ito^{‡} (incumbent) (endorsed by Komeito)	110,493	43.4	▼2.6
CDP	Ikuo Yamahana^{‡‡}	91,073	35.8	New
Kibō no Tō	Emi Kanegasaki^{‡}	30,236	11.9	New
JCP	Makoto Abe	22,859	9.0	▼5.6
Registered electors		465,616		
Turnout		259,488	55.7	▼0.4
LDP hold		Swing	▼4.3	

2014
Party	Candidate	Votes	%	±%
LDP	Tatsuya Ito^{‡} (incumbent) (endorsed by Komeito)	116,757	46.0	▲6.0
Democratic	Ikuo Yamahana^{‡}	80,014	31.5	▲8.5
JCP	Jun Sakauchi	36,980	14.6	▲5.7
Japanese Kokoro	Akira Shikano^{‡}	20,288	8.0	New
Registered electors		466,679		
Turnout		261,857	56.1	▼8.3
LDP hold		Swing	▲3.4	

2012
Party	Candidate	Votes	%	±%
LDP	Tatsuya Ito^{‡} (endorsed by Komeito)	115,290	40.0	▲1.7
Democratic	Ikuo Yamahana^{‡} (incumbent) (endorsed by the PNP)	66,210	23.0	▼27.6
Restoration	Akira Shikano^{‡}	40,698	14.1	New
Your	Ken Tsuyama^{‡}	37,805	13.1	New
JCP	Jun Sakauchi	25,740	8.9	▼0.4
Happiness Realization	Yoshihiro Ihara	2,180	0.8	New
Registered electors		462,725		
Turnout		298,180	64.4	▼3.5
LDP gain from Democratic		Swing	▲7.8	

2009
Party	Candidate	Votes	%	±%
Democratic	Ikuo Yamahana^{‡}	154,904	50.6	▲13.4
LDP	Tatsuya Ito^{‡} (incumbent) (endorsed by Komeito)	117,315	38.3	▼13.8
JCP	Masafumi Yoshioka	28,556	9.3	▼0.5
Happiness Realization	Ken Tsuyama^{‡}	5,501	1.8	New
Registered electors		459,207		
Turnout		311,893	67.9	▲1.6
Democratic gain from LDP		Swing	▲11.1	

2005
Party	Candidate	Votes	%	±%
LDP	Tatsuya Ito^{‡} (incumbent - Tokyo PR)	150,404	52.1	▲8.6
Democratic	Ikuo Yamahana^{‡} (incumbent)	107,417	37.2	▼8.7
JCP	Yoshiharu Wakabayashi^{‡}	28,356	9.8	▼0.2
Independent	Manyo Yamashita	2,483	0.9	New
Registered electors		442,182		
Turnout		293,299	66.3	▲7.4
LDP gain from Democratic		Swing	▲11.1	

2003
Party	Candidate	Votes	%	±%
Democratic	Ikuo Yamahana^{‡}(incumbent)	113,931	45.9	▲6.0
LDP	Tatsuya Ito^{‡‡}	105,385	42.5	▲13.5
JCP	Yoshiharu Wakabayashi^{‡}	24,859	10.0	▼4.3
Independent	Moritaka Sato	4,001	1.6	New
Registered electors		432,492		
Turnout		254,695	58.9	▼2.0
LDP hold		Swing	▲8.9	

2000
Party	Candidate	Votes	%	±%
Democratic	Ikuo Yamahana^{‡}	104,132	38.9	▲11.8
LDP	Yuji Shindo^{‡}	77,761	29.0	▲7.9
Liberal	Morio Suzuki^{‡}	39,503	14.7	New
JCP	Takao Okada	38,318	14.3	▼0.9
Independent	Matsumi Sakai	5,635	2.1	New
Liberal League	Koji Tomono	2,687	1.0	New
Registered electors		456,184		
Turnout		277,634	60.9	▲5.6
Democratic gain from LDP		Swing	N/A	

1996
Party	Candidate	Votes	%	±%
New Frontier	Tatsuya Ito (incumbent - former Tokyo 11th district)	69,707	29.6	New
Democratic	Sadao Yamahana^{‡‡} (incumbent - former Tokyo 11th district)	63,974	27.1	New
LDP	Yuji Shindo^{‡}	49,837	21.1	New
JCP	Yoshiko Matsuda	35,762	15.2	New
Social Democratic	Nobuto Hosaka^{‡‡}	13,904	5.9	New
New Socialist	Kazumoto Sato	2,526	1.1	New
Registered electors		436,597		
Turnout		241,613	55.3	N/A
LDP gain from Democratic		Swing	N/A	
