= Tokyo 30th district =

Electoral district in Tokyo, Japan

Tokyo 30th District
- 東京都第30区
- Parliamentary constituency for the Japanese House of Representatives
- Prefecture: Tokyo
- Proportional Block: Tokyo
- Electorate: 419,168 (as of September 2022)

Current constituency
- Created: 2022
- Seats: One
- Party: Liberal Democratic Party
- Representatives: Akihisa Nagashima
- Created from: Parts of: Tokyo 18th; Tokyo 21st; Tokyo 22nd; Tokyo 23rd

Tokyo 30th District (東京都第30区, Tokyo-to dai-sanju-ku) is an electoral district of the Japanese House of Representatives. The district was created as part of the 2022 reapportionment that added five new districts to Tokyo. Eri Igarashi, a former member of the Tokyo Metropolitan Assembly, became the first representative as a result of the 2024 general election.

== Areas covered ==
=== Current district ===
As of 11 January 2023, the areas covered by this district are as follows:

- Fuchū
- Tama
- Inagi

Before the creation of this district, Fuchu was part of the 18th district, Tama was split between the 21st and 23rd districts, and Inagi was split between the 21st and 22nd districts.

== Elected representatives ==
Representative	Party	Years served	Notes
Eri Igarashi	CDP	2024 – 2026	
Akihisa Nagashima	LDP	2026 –	Incumbent

== Election results ==
2026
Party	Candidate	Votes	%	±%
LDP	Akihisa Nagashima	110,453	45.2	▲5.9
Centrist Reform	Eri Igarashi	81,082	33.1	▼8.9
DPP	Ryūsei Kawakami	32,504	13.3	New
Sanseitō	Reiko Kotobuki	20,586	8.4	▲1.1
Registered electors		421,486		
Turnout		244,625	59.58	▲1.95
LDP gain from Centrist Reform				

2024
Party	Candidate	Votes	%	±%
CDP	Eri Igarashi	98,146	42.0	New
LDP	Akihisa Nagashima (elected by PR)	91,798	39.3	New
JCP	Kan Hayakawa	19,061	8.2	New
Sanseitō	Yūichirō Takeda	17,013	7.3	New
Anti-NHK	Ken Mitsui	7,815	3.3	New
Turnout		233,833	57.63	New
