= Tokyo 19th district =

Electoral district in Tokyo

Tokyo 19th District
- 東京都第19区
- Parliamentary constituency for the Japanese House of Representatives
- Prefecture: Tokyo
- Proportional Block: Tokyo
- Electorate: 334,159 (as of 1 September 2022)

Current constituency
- Created: 1994
- Seats: One
- Party: LDP
- Representative: Yohei Matsumoto

Tokyo 19th District (東京都第19区, Tokyo-to dai-jukyu-ku) is an electoral district of the Japanese House of Representatives. The district was created in 1994 as part of the move towards single-member districts.

== Areas covered ==
=== Current district ===
As of 16 January 2023, the areas covered by this district are as follows:

- Kodaira
- Kokubunji
- Kunitachi

As part of the 2022 redistricting, Nishitokyo was moved to the 18th district and Kunitachi was returned from the 21st district.

=== Areas 2017–2022 ===
From the second redistricting in 2017 until the third redistricting in 2022, the areas covered by this district were as follows:

- Kodaira
- Kokubunji
- Nishitokyo

As part of the 2017 redistricting, Kunitachi was moved to the 21st district.

=== Areas 2002–2017 ===
From the first redistricting in 2002 until the second redistricting in 2017, the areas covered by this district were as follows:

- Kodaira
- Kokubunji
- Kunitachi
- Nishitokyo

in 2001, Hōya and Tanashi merged to create the new city of Nishitokyo.

=== Areas from before 2002 ===
From the creation of the district in 1994, until the first redistricting in 2002, the areas covered by this district were as follows:

- Kodaira
- Kokubunji
- Kunitachi
- Tanashi
- Hōya

== Elected representatives ==
Representatives	Party	Years served	Notes
Yoshinori Suematsu	DP	1996-2000	
Yoshinori Suematsu	DPJ	2000-2005	Elected to the Tokyo PR district in the 2005 general election.
Yohei Matsumoto	LDP	2005-2009	Not re-elected in the 2009 general election.
Yoshinori Suematsu	DPJ	2009-2012	Not re-elected in the 2012 general election.
Yohei Matsumoto	LDP	2012-2021	Elected to the Tokyo PR district in the 2021 general election.
Yoshinori Suematsu	CDP	2021-2026	
Yohei Matsumoto	LDP	2026-	

== Election results ==
‡ - Also ran in the Tokyo PR district

‡‡ - Also ran and won in the Tokyo PR district

2026
Party	Candidate	Votes	%	±%
LDP	Yohei Matsumoto^{‡}	93,697	45.9	▲6.7
Centrist Reform	Yoshinori Suematsu^{‡} (incumbent)	54,345	26.6	▼12.8
DPP	Reiko Suwa^{‡}	28,452	13.9	
JCP	Mitsuko Ideshige	14,350	7.0	▼3.5
Sanseitō	Yōko Ichinose	13,463	6.6	
Registered electors		334,029		
Turnout			62.07	▲1.82
LDP gain from Centrist Reform				

2024
Party	Candidate	Votes	%	±%
CDP	Yoshinori Suematsu (incumbent)	76,899	39.43	▼3.60
LDP	Yohei Matsumoto‡‡	74,435	38.16	▼4.04
Ishin	Kei'ichirō Yoshida	23,289	11.94	▼2.83
JCP	Mitsuko Ideshige	20,417	10.47	
Turnout		195,040	60.25	▲0.25

2021
Party	Candidate	Votes	%	±%
CDP	Yoshinori Suematsu^{‡} (incumbent - Tokyo PR)	111,267	43.0	▲4.3
LDP	Yohei Matsumoto^{‡‡} (incumbent) (endorsed by Komeito)	109,131	42.2	▲1.1
Ishin	Hideaki Yamazaki^{‡}	38,182	14.8	New
Registered electors		439,147		
Turnout		263,488	60.0	▲4.2
CDP gain from LDP		Swing	▲2.2	

2017
Party	Candidate	Votes	%	±%
LDP	Yohei Matsumoto^{‡} (incumbent) (endorsed by Komeito)	96,229	41.1	▲0.1
CDP	Yoshinori Suematsu^{‡‡}	90,540	38.7	New
Kibō no Tō	Rika Sasaki^{‡}	29,743	12.7	New
JCP	Shigeo Sugishita	17,377	7.4	▼6.6
Registered electors		425,966		
Turnout		237,859	55.8	▼1.6
LDP hold		Swing	▲3.4	

2014
Party	Candidate	Votes	%	±%
LDP	Yohei Matsumoto^{‡}	107,608	41.0	▲6.6
Democratic	Yoshinori Suematsu^{‡} (endorsed by the JIP)	87,584	33.3	▲5.7
JCP	Tamishi Koizumi	36,878	14.0	▲5.6
Japanese Kokoro	Hiroshi Yamada^{‡}	30,658	11.7	New
Registered electors		470,785		
Turnout		270,278	57.4	▼7.8
LDP hold		Swing	▲3.5	

2012
Party	Candidate	Votes	%	±%
LDP	Yohei Matsumoto^{‡}	101,362	34.4	▲0.3
Democratic	Yoshinori Suematsu^{‡} (incumbent) (endorsed by the PNP)	81,490	27.6	▼27.4
Restoration	Hiroshi Yamada^{‡‡} (endorsed by Your Party)	64,857	22.0	New
JCP	Mitsuko Ide	24,660	8.4	▼0.6
Tomorrow	Koichiro Watanabe^{‡} (incumbent - Tokyo PR) (endorsed by the NDP)	22,445	7.6	New
Registered electors		466,796		
Turnout		304,444	65.2	▼2.9
LDP gain from Democratic		Swing	▲6.3	

2009
Party	Candidate	Votes	%	±%
Democratic	Yoshinori Suematsu^{‡} (incumbent - Tokyo PR)	170,437	55.0	▲10.1
LDP	Yohei Matsumoto^{‡} (incumbent)	105,721	34.1	▼12.2
JCP	Akio Shimizu	27,860	9.0	▼0.3
Independent	Saeko Takahashi	2,912	0.9	New
Happiness Realization	Shinichiro Ishida	2,740	0.9	New
Registered electors		462,375		
Turnout		314,924	68.1	▲0.2
Democratic gain from LDP		Swing	▲9.3	

2005
Party	Candidate	Votes	%	±%
LDP	Yohei Matsumoto^{‡}	138,596	46.3	▲11.9
Democratic	Yoshinori Suematsu^{‡‡} (incumbent)	133,180	44.5	▼8.4
JCP	Akio Shimizu	27,811	9.3	▲0.4
Registered electors		449,209		
Turnout		304,788	67.9	▲8.0
LDP gain from Democratic		Swing	▲9.2	

2003
Party	Candidate	Votes	%	±%
Democratic	Yoshinori Suematsu^{‡} (incumbent)	136,082	52.9	▲7.5
LDP	Yohei Matsumoto^{‡}	88,501	34.4	▲6.5
JCP	Tomoaki Fujioka	22,921	8.9	▼5.6
Social Democratic	Shozo Yokota^{‡}	9,529	3.7	New
Registered electors		441,891		
Turnout		264,658	59.9	▼2.9
Democratic hold		Swing	▲3.8	

2000
Party	Candidate	Votes	%	±%
Democratic	Yoshinori Suematsu^{‡}	118,852	45.4	New
LDP	Koji Tsukahara^{‡}	73,076	27.9	▲7.7
JCP	Toshikiyo Miyauchi	38,040	14.5	▲0.5
Liberal	Koichiro Watanabe^{‡}	31,772	12.1	New
Registered electors		426,638		
Turnout		267,843	62.8	▲4.1
Democratic gain from Democratic		Swing	N/A	

1996
Party	Candidate	Votes	%	±%
Democratic	Yoshinori Suematsu^{‡}	76,599	32.5	New
New Frontier	Koichiro Watanabe (incumbent - former Tokyo 7th district)	54,641	23.2	New
LDP	Tetsuo Kaneko^{‡}	47,675	20.2	New
JCP	Atsuro Asakura	33,075	14.0	New
Social Democratic	Hiroshi Tsunematsu^{‡}	21,557	9.2	New
Liberal League	Taro Ito^{‡}	1,998	0.9	New
Registered electors		409,680		
Turnout		240,277	58.7	New
Democratic win (new seat)				
