= Tokyo 6th district =

Japan House of Representatives constituency

Tokyo 6th District
- Parliamentary constituency for the Japanese House of Representatives
- Numbered map of inner Tokyo single-member districts
- Prefecture: Tokyo
- Proportional District: Tokyo
- Electorate: 486,353 (2012)

Current constituency
- Created: 1994
- Seats: One
- Party: LDP
- Representative: Shōgo Azemoto
- Created from: Tokyo 3rd district
- Wards: Parts of Setagaya

Tokyo 6th district is a constituency of the House of Representatives in the Diet of Japan (national legislature). It is located in Tokyo, and consists of a part of Setagaya, one of Tokyo's 23 special wards. With 2.18 times as many voters as Tokushima's 1st district, it had the lowest electoral weight throughout Japan in the election of 2005. In 2007 the Supreme Court dismissed a claim that the election in this and other Tokyo districts was unconstitutional and thus invalid. As of September 2012, 486,353 eligible voters were registered in the district, giving them the third lowest electoral weight in the country.

Before the electoral reform of 1994, Setagaya was part of Tokyo 3rd district, a three-member single non-transferable vote (SNTV) constituency. The post-reform single-member constituencies were used in the 1996 election for the first time.

Since its creation, the urban district had been dominated by opposition candidates until the landslide "postal privatization" election of 2005 when Liberal Democratic candidate Takao Ochi was able to defeat Democratic incumbent Yōko Komiyama by a slim margin. Komiyama was reelected via the Tokyo proportional representation block and ran again in Tokyo 6th district in the election of 2009. In 2012, Ochi received only less than a third of the vote but retook the district as the opposition to the LDP splintered. After Democratic representative Kōki Ishii had been stabbed to death in 2002 by a rightwing activist, a by-election was held on April 27, 2003.

== List of representatives ==
Representative	Party	Dates	Notes
Tetsundo Iwakuni	NFP	1996–2000	
Kōki Ishii	DPJ	2000–2002	
Yōko Komiyama	DPJ	2003–2005	Re-elected in the Tokyo PR block
Takao Ochi	LDP	2005–2009	Failed re-election in the Tokyo block
Yōko Komiyama	DPJ	2009–2012	Failed re-election in the Tokyo block
Takao Ochi	LDP	2012–2017	Failed re-election in the Tokyo block
Takayuki Ochiai	CDP	2017-2026	Re-elected in the Tokyo PR block
Shōgo Azemoto	LDP	2026–	

== Election results ==
2026
Party	Candidate	Votes	%	±%
LDP	Shōgo Azemoto	90,077	37.7	▲9.5
Centrist Reform	Takayuki Ochiai (elected in Tokyo PR block)	79,262	33.2	▼14.2
DPP	Katsuki Maruyama	43,524	18.2	
Sanseitō	Naoki Shimamura	23,362	9.8	▲0
World Peace	Yasuhiro Fukumura	2,424	1.0	
Registered electors		401,521		
Turnout			61.49	▲2.67
LDP gain from Centrist Reform				

2024
Party	Candidate	Votes	%	±%
CDP	Takayuki Ochiai	107,222	47.40%	▲7.30
LDP	Miwa Tsuchiya	63,899	28.25%	▼10.05
Ishin	Kenichi Kawamura	32,887	14,54%	▼7.06
Sanseitō	Masanori Mochizuki	22,179	9.81	New
Turnout		226,187	58.82%	▼1.54

2021
Party	Candidate	Votes	%	±%
CDP	Takayuki Ochiai	110,169	40.1	▼0.7
LDP	Takao Ochi (elected by PR)	105,186	38.3	▼1.7
Ishin	Rie Usui	59,490	21.6	New
Turnout		274,845	60.36	▲4.9
CDP hold				

2017
Party	Candidate	Votes	%	±%
CDP	Takayuki Ochiai	100,400	40.8	
LDP	Takao Ochi (elected by PR)	98,422	40.0	▼4.1
Kibō no Tō	Emiko Uematsu	42,862	17.4	
Happiness Realization	Maki Nakaoka	4,307	1.8	
Turnout			55.4	▼0.0
CDP gain from LDP				

2014
Party	Candidate	Votes	%	±%
LDP	Takao Ochi	110,872	44.1	▲11.2
Ishin	Takayuki Ochiai (elected by PR)	88,915	35.4	
JCP	Takeshi Kishi	51,595	20.5	▲12.2
Turnout			55.4	▼7.9
LDP hold				

2012
Party	Candidate	Votes	%	±%
LDP (Kōmeitō)	Takao Ochi	98,112	32.9	
DPJ (PNP)	Yōko Komiyama	70,126	23.5	
JRP	Tomofumi Hanawa	52,734	17.7	
YP	Takayuki Ochiai	52,325	17.6	
JCP	Naoki Satō	24,725	8.3	

2009
Party	Candidate	Votes	%	±%
DPJ	Yōko Komiyama	174,367.916		
LDP	Takao Ochi	102,944.000		
JCP	Naoki Satō	27,105.000		
Happiness Realization Party	Yōko Nakaoka	4,986.083		
Turnout		316,412	65.67	

2005
Party	Candidate	Votes	%	±%
LDP	Takao Ochi	136,750	45.21	
DPJ	Yōko Komiyama	130,283	43.07	
JCP	Miyoko Tanaka	28,252	9.34	
Turnout		302,484	65.03	

2003
Party	Candidate	Votes	%	±%
DPJ	Yōko Komiyama	131,715	50.71	
LDP	Takao Ochi	78,650	30.28	
SDP	Nobuto Hosaka	23,320	8.98	
JCP	Miyoko Tanaka	18,625	7.17	
Turnout		259,727	56.54	

2003 by-election
Party	Candidate	Votes	%	±%
DPJ	Yōko Komiyama	99,600	53.59	
LDP	Michio Ochi	57,783	31.09	
JCP	Miyoko Tanaka	20,486	11.02	
Turnout		185,842	40.63	

2000
Party	Candidate	Votes	%	±%
DPJ	Kōki Ishii	93,919	36.16	
LDP	Michio Ochi	55,821	21.49	
SDP	Nobuto Hosaka	38,167	14.70	
Liberal Party	Yoshio Suzuki	30,914	12.28	
JCP	Osamu Minase	26,130	10.38	
Liberal League	Rieko Saitō	6,765	2,69	
Turnout		251,716	58.26	

1996
Party	Candidate	Votes	%	±%
NFP	Tetsundo Iwakuni	82,106	34.46	
LDP	Michio Ochi	62,518	26.24	
DPJ	Kōki Ishii	52,014	21.83	
JCP	Osamu Minase	29,636	12.39	
SDP	Hiroshi Ōmura	10,384	4.36	
Independent	Masaharu Kitazato	1,590	0.67	
Turnout		238,248		
