= Tokyo 27th district =

Electoral district in Tokyo, Japan

Tokyo 27th District
- 東京都第27区
- Parliamentary constituency for the Japanese House of Representatives
- Prefecture: Tokyo
- Proportional Block: Tokyo
- Electorate: 383,150 (as of September 2022)

Current constituency
- Created: 2022
- Seats: One
- Party: LDP
- Representative: Yūichi Kurasaki
- Created from: Parts of: Tokyo 7th; Tokyo 8th; Tokyo 10th

Tokyo 27th District (東京都第27区, Tokyo-to dai-nijunana-ku) is an electoral district of the Japanese House of Representatives. It was first created as part of the 2022 reapportionments that added five districts to Tokyo. The incumbent of the 7th district, former cabinet minister Akira Nagatsuma became the first representative as a result of the 2024 general election.

== Areas covered ==
=== Current district ===
As of 11 January 2023, the areas covered by the district are as follows:

- Nakano
- Suginami (eastern areas)
  - Honan 1 & 2, Izumi 1–4, Eifuku 1, Wada 1–3, Horinouchi 1–3, Matsunoku 1–3, Omiya 1, Omiya 2 (1-4, 19–27), Umezato 1–2, Koenji-Minami 1–5, Koenji-kita 1

Before the creation of the district, Nakano Ward was split between the 7th and 10th districts, and the eastern parts of Suginami Ward were formerly split between the 7th and 8th districts.

== Elected representatives ==
Representative	Party	Years served	Notes
Akira Nagatsuma	CDP	2024 – 2026	Represented 7th district pre-reapportionment
Yūichi Kurasaki	LDP	2026 –	

== Election results ==
2026
Party	Candidate	Votes	%	±%
LDP	Yūichi Kurasaki	85,249	38.1	▲9.0
Centrist Reform	Akira Nagatsuma (elected by PR)	80,997	36.2	▼18.3
DPP	Takashi Suyama	37,848	16.9	
Sanseitō	Aiko Ogasawara	19,374	8.7	▼2.5
Turnout			59.78	▲4.17
LDP gain from Centrist Reform				

2024
Party	Candidate	Votes	%	±%
CDP	Akira Nagatsuma	112,388	54.6	
LDP	Yūichi Kurasaki	59,952	29.1	
Sanseitō	Meiko Ishikawa	22,947	11.1	
Independent	Kōjirō Ishikura	10,542	5.1	
Turnout			55.61	
