= Takayuki Ochiai =

Japanese politician

- 落合 貴之
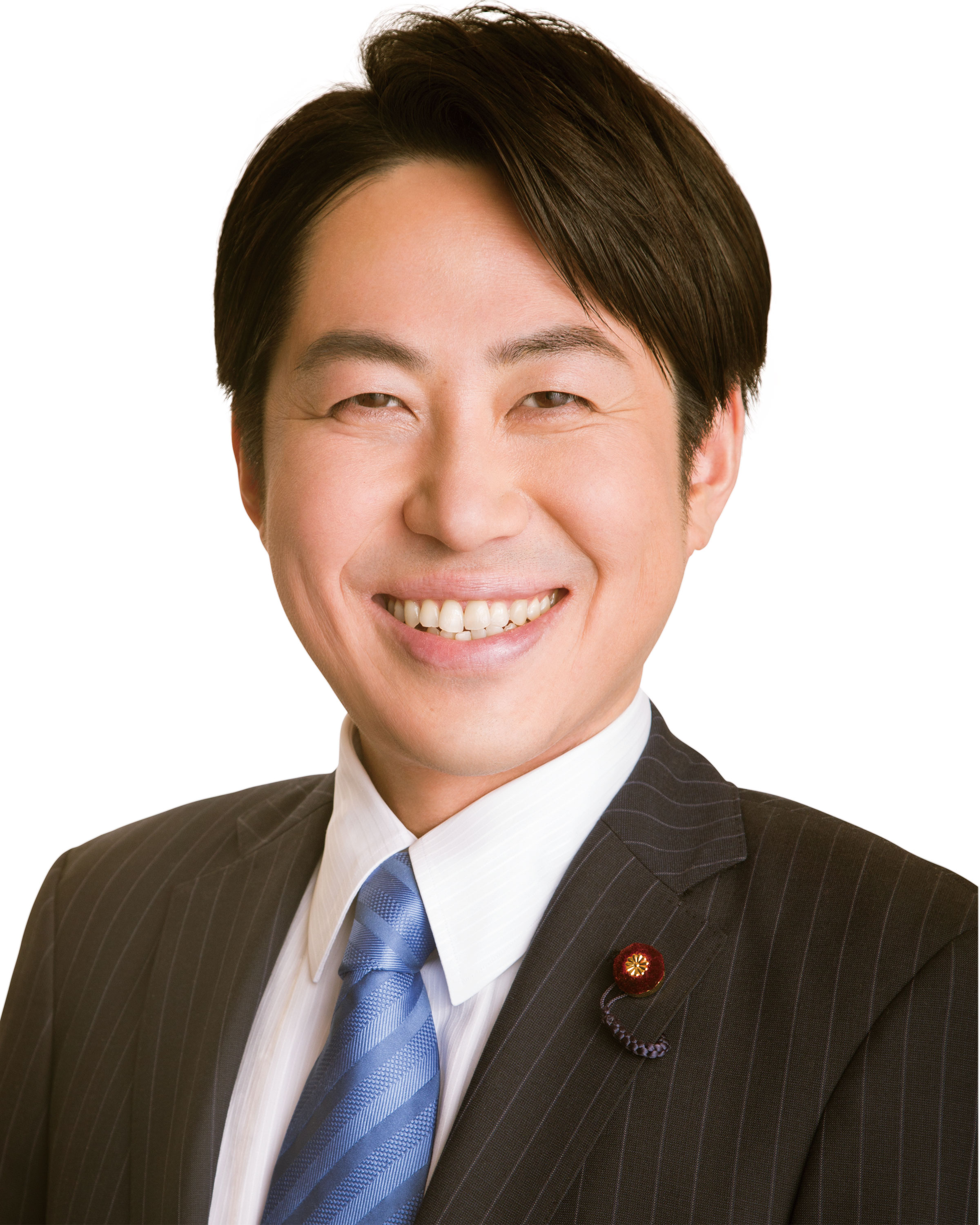
- Official portrait, 2018

Member of the House of Representatives
- Incumbent
- Assumed office 19 December 2014
- Preceded by: Multi-member district
- Constituency: Tokyo PR (2014–2017); Tokyo 6th (2017–2026); Tokyo PR (2026–present)

Personal details
- Born: 17 August 1979 (age 47) Setagaya, Tokyo, Japan
- Party: DRP (since 2026)
- Other political affiliations: Your Party (2012–2013); Independent (2013–2014); Unity (2014); JIP (2014–2016); DP (2016–2017); CDP (2017–2026); CRA (2026)
- Spouse: Kumiko Horiuchi
- Children: 2
- Education: Keio University
- Website: ochiaitakayuki.com

Takayuki Ochiai (落合 貴之, Ochiai Takayuki; born 17 August 1979) is a Japanese politician from the Constitutional Democratic Party (CDP) and a member of the House of Representatives in the Diet (national legislature). Ochiai represents the Tokyo 6th district.

== Biography ==
Ochiai was born in Setagaya, Tokyo in 1979. After graduating with an economics degree from Keio University, he joined the Sumitomo Mitsui Banking Corporation. He started his foray into politics by working as the main secretary for Diet members Kenji Eda and Kota Matsuda.

He first contested an election in 2012 as the Your Party (YP) candidate for the Tokyo 6th district, finishing fourth at that time. A year later, Ochiai left the party after disagreeing with its policy of supporting the draconian State Secrecy Law pushed by the Abe government. In May 2014, he joined the Unity Party which was formed by anti-State Secrecy Law ex-YP members. The party was then merged into the Japan Innovation Party (JIP) in the same year.

Ochiai recontested Tokyo-6th in the 2014 general election. This time, he lost by a narrower margin than in 2012, thus enabling him to win a Diet seat via his party's proportional representation list. When the JIP merged with the Democratic Party of Japan, he joined the post-merger Democratic Party.

As an opponent against amending Article 9 of the Japanese Constitution, Ochiai protested then-DP president Seiji Maehara's decision to join hands with Yuriko Koike's pro-amendment Party of Hope in the imminent 2017 general election. In the ensuing party split, he joined the CDP and contested the Tokyo-6th seat again in the election. He shockingly defeated the LDP incumbent and former vice minister Takao Ochi in the constituency. This would mark the first time Ochiai won a constituency seat.

== Personal life ==
Ochiai is married to Kumiko Horiuchi. They live in a rented apartment in Setagaya along with their two children. During his time as a political secretary, he was nicknamed Thin Eyebrows (麻呂, maro) by Kenji Eda and Bed Hair Prince (寝ぐせ王子, neguse ōji) by Kota Matsuda.

Ochiai's role models are Shusei Tanaka and Mahatma Gandhi.
