= Kōki Ishii =

Japanese politician (1940–2002)

- 石井 紘基

Member of the House of Representatives
- In office 19 July 1993 – 25 October 2002
- Preceded by: Kazuo Saitō
- Succeeded by: Yoko Komiyama
- Constituency: Tokyo 3rd (1993–1996); Tokyo PR (1996–2000); Tokyo 6th (2000–2002)

Personal details
- Born: 6 November 1940 Setagaya, Tokyo, Japan
- Died: 25 October 2002 (aged 61) Meguro, Tokyo, Japan
- Party: Democratic (1998–2002)
- Other political affiliations: SDF (1978–1992); JNP (1992–1994); LL (1994–1996); NPS (1996); DP (1996–1998)
- Spouse: Natasha Ishii
- Education: Chuo University; Waseda University; Moscow State University
- Website: Memorial blog

Kōki Ishii (石井 紘基, Ishii Kōki) (6 November 1940 – 25 October 2002) was a Japanese politician of the Democratic Party of Japan (DPJ) born in Setagaya, Tokyo. A lifelong reformist, he was murdered under suspicious circumstances.

== Early life and education ==
Ishii graduated from Chuo University, where he studied law, and then from the graduate school of Waseda University. During his student years, he participated in student activism. Following a recommendation from Yasushi Akutagawa, then Representative of the Japan-Soviet Union Youth Friendship Committee, Ishii spent six years in the Soviet Union as an international student at Lomonosov Moscow State University. There he majored in the theory of state and law under the guidance of Professor A. Y. Denisov and earned a doctorate in philosophy.

== Political career ==
After coming back from Moscow, Ishii started his political activity at the Socialist Democratic Federation (Japan) (SDF). In 1992 he defected from the SDF, entered the Japan New Party and was elected to the House of Representatives of Japan in 1993. Ishii was the Parliamentary Vice-Minister of the Management and Coordination Agency under Prime Minister Tsutomu Hata.

Even though he was elected from Japan New Party, Ishii broke with Morihiro Hosokawa and did not enter the New Frontier Party. After being the member of the Liberal League and the New Party Sakigake, Ishii participated in the formation of the DPJ in 1996.

Ishii's Dietary career was marked by his fieldwork concerning waste in government spending. He utilized the investigative function of the diet and headed an anticorruption task force known as the "G-Men Squad" within the DPJ. In November 1997, Ishii uncovered malfeasance in the Central Procurement Office of the Ministry of Defense, which has led to a criminal investigation by the Tokyo Local Public Prosecutors Office. The investigation revealed government waste of over 2 trillion yen per year.

Ishii's proposals were as follows:

1. To reduce the power of amakudari companies, to collect the capital paid by the Government and the assets increased, and to return them to the people. (His investigation revealed that there exists more than 3,000 such companies in Japan)
2. To strengthen the powers of the Board of Audit.
3. To reduce the use of keiretsu companies (large public–private partnerships that form horizontal conglomerates) and re-allocate contracts to private small and medium-sized enterprises.

In 1999, Ishii formed a bipartisan group in the Diet to track Aum Shinrikyo members. He played an active role in exposing the activities of Aum Shinrikyo in Russia, where it had continued to operate.

In 2000 Ishii opposed the screening of Battle Royale, which portrays students that kill each other until only one is left, and asked Tadamori Oshima, the Minister of Education at that time for the government opinion towards the film in the 150th Diet. Ironically this attracted the public interest so that the film grossed ¥3.11 billion domestically (around $25 million US).

=== Final year in the Diet ===
In 2002, Ishii intensified his investigations into the Japanese budget and believed that the real government spending of the Japanese Government was about 200 trillion yen, much of which was being concealed from the public. Masajuro Shiokawa, the Finance Minister at that time, refused to comment, claiming that Ishii was merely expressing an opinion. Spurned by the legislative process, Ishii wrote a book about his discoveries, Japan's Secret Checkbook: The Truth about the Financial Interests That Will Destroy the Nation (2002). It was published by a small alternative press.

== Murder ==
On 25 October 2002, Ishii was stabbed to death by Ito Hakusui, a Yamaguchi-gumi gangster. Ishii was the third Japanese politician murdered after the end of World War II. Ito escaped down the road covered in blood in broad daylight and fled to the mountains without being noticed, but surrendered himself the next day. Ito said he killed Ishii because Ishii refused to pay a bribe. The police claimed that Ito had "personal" motives, making a larger investigation unnecessary. On 15 November 2005, the Supreme Court sentenced Ito to life in prison without being able to determine a motive. After Ishii's death, a by-election was held in Tokyo 6th District on 27 April 2003, and Yoko Komiyama of DPJ was elected to the House of Representatives. Ishii's family refused to endorse her.

=== Evidence for assassination ===
Noriyuki Imanishi, an investigative journalist, claims that Ishii told him just before his death that he had "discovered something terrible." His wife and staff members reported that Ishii made similar statements to them. Ishii had been about to make an address to the Diet when he was murdered, and that day he was going to the Diet to deposit confidential papers. In the chaos after the murder, his briefcase was emptied by an unknown person. Imanishi and others close to Ishii suspect assassination. In 2008, Ito renounced his sworn testimony that there were "personal" motives for the assassination, and then claimed that he had been hired to kill Ishii. In October 2010, Asahi TV aired a primetime special on the murder, and an expert claimed that forensic evidence showed Ito was attempting to seize Ishii's briefcase. Asahi interviewed Ito, and received the following replies:

Q. Why did you kill Ishii? Were you trying to get his documents?
A. The story about documents is made up. His briefcase was empty.
Q. You looked inside the briefcase?
A. No, I didn't.
Q. Then how do you know it was empty?
A. I don't know anything about documents.

According to Diet member Nobuto Hosaka, there were a number of suspicious circumstances surrounding the murder. Hosaka wrote on his blog that the police squad in charge of the murder did not follow basic investigative procedure, such as searching for fingerprints, and that Ishii's diary also went missing at some point after his murder. Hosaka has noted that one disturbing detail is that reporters had called him asking about Ito immediately after the murder, a day before any suspects had been announced. The Asahi TV documentary did not report this incident.

Since 2004, Ishii's family has offered a reward of 1 million yen (roughly US$10,000) for any information about the murder.

== Bibliography ==
- Ishii, Kōki (1988). United We Stand, Divided We Fall. Tokyo: Sohjusha KK. ISBN 4-7943-0046-8.
- Ishii, Kōki (1996). Kanryō Tengoku Nihon Hasan (Bureaucrats paradise Japan goes into bunkruptcy). Tokyo: Michi-Shuppan. ISBN 4-7901-0130-4.
- Ishii, Kōki (2001). Nihon wo kuitsukusu Kiseichū (The Parasites consuming Japan). Tokyo: Michi-Shuppan. ISBN 4-944154-40-2.

== See also ==
- Inejiro Asanuma
- Terrorism

Party political offices
Preceded by Koji Kakizawa	Representative of Liberal League; 1995	Succeeded by Keizo Kojima
