= Ikuo Yamahana =

Japanese politician

- 山花 郁夫
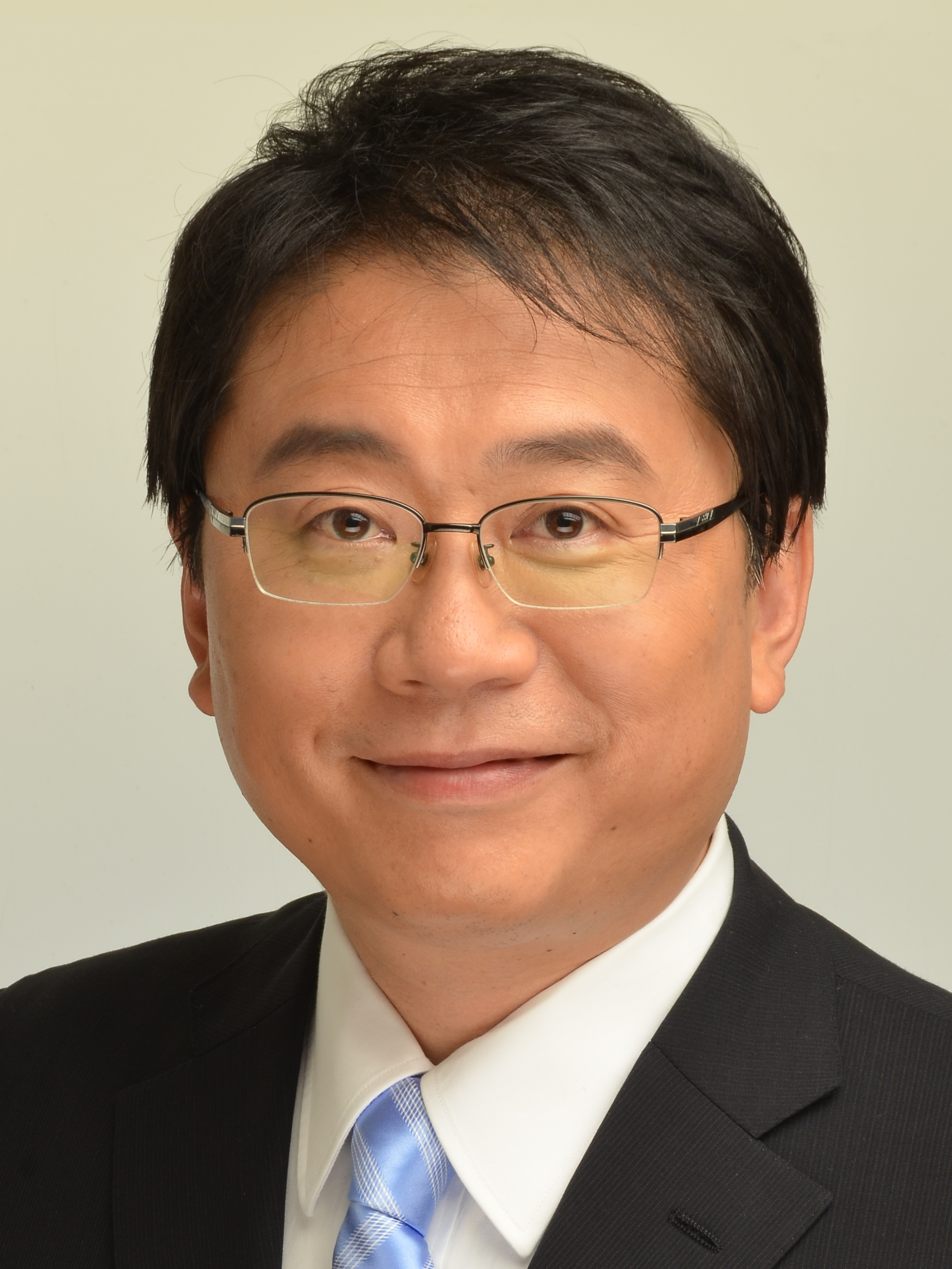
- Official portrait, 2012

Member of the House of Representatives
- In office 27 October 2024 – 23 January 2026
- Preceded by: Tatsuya Ito
- Succeeded by: Tatsuya Ito
- Constituency: Tokyo 22nd
- In office 23 October 2017 – 14 October 2021
- Constituency: Tokyo PR
- In office 30 August 2009 – 16 November 2012
- Preceded by: Tatsuya Ito
- Succeeded by: Tatsuya Ito
- Constituency: Tokyo 22nd
- In office 26 June 2000 – 8 August 2005
- Preceded by: Tatsuya Ito
- Succeeded by: Tatsuya Ito
- Constituency: Tokyo 22nd

Personal details
- Born: 山花 郁夫 (Ikuo Yamahana); 18 January 1967 (age 59) Chōfu, Tokyo, Japan
- Party: CRA (since 2026)
- Other political affiliations: DPJ (1998–2016); DP (2016–2017); CDP (2017–2026)
- Parent: Sadao Yamahana (father)
- Relatives: Hideo Yamahana (grandfather)
- Education: Ritsumeikan University

Ikuo Yamahana (Japanese: 山花 郁夫, Hepburn: Yamahana Ikuo; born 18 January 1967) is a Japanese politician of the Constitutional Democratic Party of Japan, who served as a member of House of Representatives in the Diet (national legislature).

== Political career ==
Yamahana is the son of the former chairman of the Japanese Socialist Party, Sadao Yamahana. He started his political career as a secretary to then-Diet member and future Prime Minister Yukio Hatoyama.

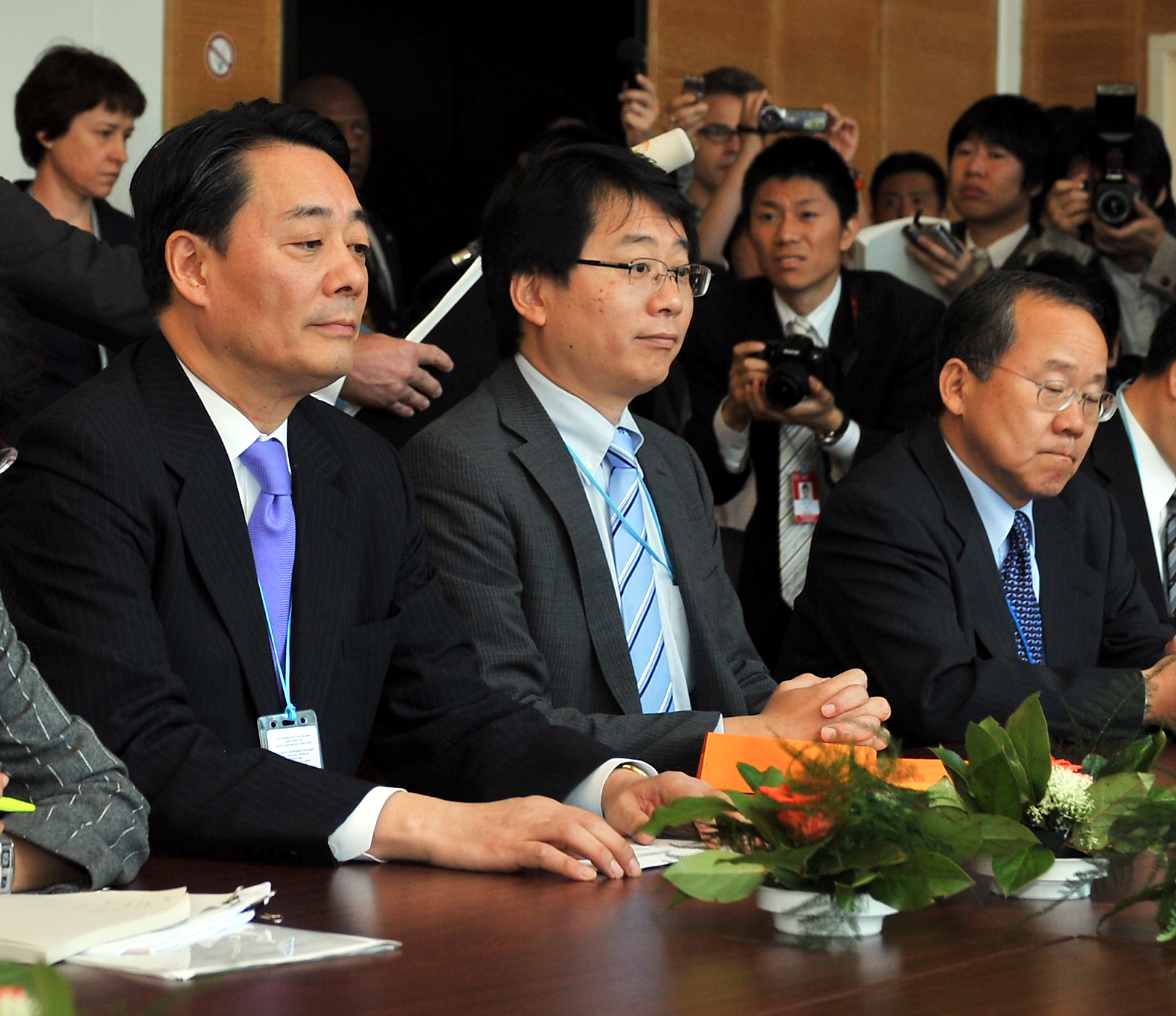
(Left to right) Banri Kaieda, Yamahana and Takeshi Nakane talking with Yukiya Amano, Director General of the IAEA, at the Ministerial Conference on Nuclear Safety in Vienna, June 2011.

Yamahana has only run in Tokyo's 22nd district for all his parliamentary career and represented it several times. He lost his seat twice in the LDP landslides of 2005 and 2012. After 2 unsuccessful runs to regain his seat in 2012 and 2014, Yamahana managed to return to the Diet in the 2017 election via the Tokyo proportional representation block. While losing the race for the Tokyo-22nd seat, he gained enough votes to be returned through the CDP's list in the Tokyo block.

Yamahana served as Parliamentary Secretary for Foreign Affairs in the cabinet of Naoto Kan and as Deputy Justice Minister in the cabinet of Yoshihiko Noda.

== See also ==
- Tokyo Shimbun
