= Yōsuke Takagi =

Japanese politician

- 高木 陽介
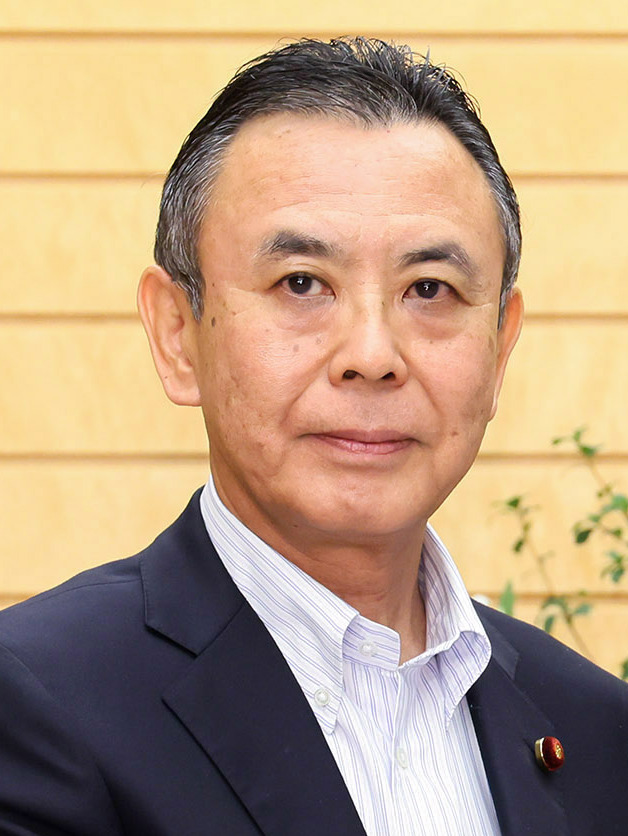

Member of the House of Representatives
- In office 25 June 2000 – 9 October 2024
- Preceded by: Multi-member district
- Succeeded by: Eriko Ōmori
- Constituency: Tokyo PR
- In office 18 July 1993 – 27 September 1996
- Preceded by: Makoto Saitō
- Succeeded by: Constituency abolished
- Constituency: Tokyo 11th

Personal details
- Born: 16 December 1959 (age 66) Ōta, Tokyo, Japan
- Party: Komeito
- Other political affiliations: CGP (1993–1996); NFP (1996–1998)
- Education: Soka University

Yōsuke Takagi (高木 陽介, Takagi Yōsuke; born 16 December 1959) is a Japanese politician who served in the House of Representatives in the Diet as a member of the Komeito Party. A native of Ōta, Tokyo and graduate of Soka University he was elected for the first time in 1993 after working at the national newspaper Mainichi Shimbun for 7 years.

He was one of the chief guests for the Andhra Pradesh state capital, Amaravati's official foundation ceremony.
