= Hiroshi Imai =

Japanese politician (1941–2023)

- 今井 宏
- Official portrait, 2004

Member of the House of Representatives; from Northern Kanto
- In office 9 November 2003 – 21 July 2009
- Preceded by: Multi-member district
- Succeeded by: Ritsuo Hosokawa
- Constituency: PR block (2003–2005); Saitama 3rd (2005–2009)
- In office 18 July 1993 – 2 June 2000
- Preceded by: Shizuo Wada
- Succeeded by: Ritsuo Hosokawa
- Constituency: Saitama 1st (1993–1996); Saitama 3rd (1996–2000)

Mayor of Sōka
- In office 14 October 1977 – 24 June 1993
- Preceded by: Shigeru Suzuki
- Succeeded by: Hiroshi Ozawa

Member of the Sōka City Council
- In office 1970–1977

Personal details
- Born: 15 July 1941 Sōka, Saitama, Japan
- Died: 3 March 2023 (aged 81) Saitama Prefecture, Japan
- Party: Liberal Democratic
- Other political affiliations: JNP (1993–1994); NFP (1994–1996)
- Education: Kasukabe High School; Waseda University

Hiroshi Imai (今井 宏, Imai Hiroshi; 15 July 1941 – 3 March 2023) was a Japanese politician of the Liberal Democratic Party (LDP), who served as a member of the House of Representatives in the Diet (national legislature). A native of Sōka, Saitama and graduate of Waseda University, he was elected to the city assembly of Sōka in 1970 (serving for one term) and then to the first of his four terms as the mayor of Sōka in 1977. He was elected to the House of Representatives for the first time in 1993 as a member of the Japan New Party. After becoming a member of the New Frontier Party, he joined the LDP.

Imai died on 3 March 2023, at the age of 81.
