= Tatsuya Ito (politician) =

Japanese politician

- 伊藤 逹也
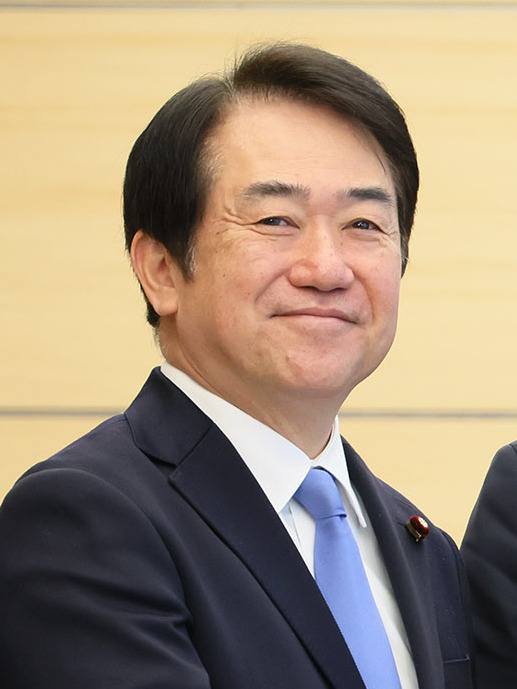
- Ito in 2024

Member of the House of Representatives
- Incumbent
- Assumed office 19 December 2012
- Preceded by: Ikuo Yamahana
- Constituency: Tokyo 22nd (2012–2024); Tokyo PR (2024–2026); Tokyo 22nd (2026–present)
- In office 19 July 1993 – 21 July 2009
- Preceded by: Yozo Ishikawa
- Succeeded by: Ikuo Yamahana
- Constituency: Tokyo 11th (1993–1996); Tokyo 22nd (1996–2000); Tokyo PR (2000–2005); Tokyo 22nd (2005–2009)

Personal details
- Born: 6 July 1961 (age 65) Osaka, Japan
- Party: Liberal Democratic
- Other political affiliations: JNP (1993–1994); NFP (1994–1997); Independent (1997–1998); GGP (1998)
- Education: Keio-Gijuku University

Tatsuya Ito (伊藤 達也, Itō Tatsuya; born 6 July 1961) is a member of the House of Representatives in the National Diet of Japan, representing multiple electoral districts of Tokyo since 1993.

Born in Tokyo, Ito graduated from Faculty of Law, Keio-Gijuku University and joined Matsushita Institute of Government and Management in 1984. He was first elected to the House of Representatives in 1993. In 2004, he was appointed the Minister of State for Financial Services in the Cabinet of Prime Minister Junichiro Koizumi.
