= Kiyoshi Odawara =

Japanese politician

- 小田原 潔
- Official portrait, 2026

Member of the House of Representatives
- Incumbent
- Assumed office 9 February 2026
- Preceded by: Masako Ōkawara
- Constituency: Tokyo 21st
- In office 17 December 2012 – 9 October 2024
- Preceded by: Multi-member district
- Succeeded by: Masako Ōkawara
- Constituency: Tokyo PR (2012–2014); Tokyo 21st (2014–2017); Tokyo PR (2017–2021); Tokyo 21st (2021–2024)

Personal details
- Born: 23 May 1964 (age 62) Usa, Ōita, Japan
- Party: Liberal Democratic
- Education: University of Tokyo
- Website: Kiyoshi Odawara website

Kiyoshi Odawara (小田原 潔, Odawara Kiyoshi; born 23 May 1964) is a Japanese politician of the Liberal Democratic Party, who serves as a member of the House of Representatives.

== Early years ==
Odawara was born in Usa, Ōita Prefecture. In March 1987, he graduated from the Economics Department of the University of Tokyo and joined Fuji Bank in April.

In 1996, he moved to Merrill Lynch Securities, and in 2000, he moved to Goldman Sachs Securities. Furthermore, in 2004, he moved to German Securities. He then moved to Morgan Stanley Securities in 2007.

== Political career ==
In the 2010 House of Councillors election, Odawara was nominated by LDP and ran for Ōita at-large district, but was defeated by DPJ incumbent Shinya Adachi and lost the election.

In the 2012 general election, Odawara was nominated as LDP's Tokyo 21st candidate but lost to DPJ Incumbent Akihisa Nagashima after a close race. However, Odawara won a seat in Tokyo PR block.

In the 2014 general election, Odawara defeated Nagashima (DPJ) and won Tokyo 21st's seat after a close race. Defeated Nagashima won a seat in Tokyo PR block.

In 2016, Odawara was appointed to the Parliamentary Vice-Minister for Foreign Affairs in the Third Abe Second reshuffled cabinet.

In the 2017 general election, Odawara defeated by Kibō’s Nagashima. He won a seat in Tokyo PR block again.

On June 27, 2019, Akihisa Nagashima, who had been fighting with Odawara for Tokyo 21st’s seat, joined LDP. Nagashima said, "I'm not going to join LDP in the hope of kicking down Odawara, who is not at fault." and offered to move to another constituency. As a result, Nagashima was moved to Tokyo 18th district, constituency of former PM Naoto Kan, whom Nagashima once served as a Special Advisor to the PM.

In 2021, Odawara was appointed to the State Minister for Foreign Affairs in the First Kishida cabinet.

In the 2021 general election, Odawara defeated CDP’s Masako Ōkawara and won Tokyo 21st's seat. Meanwhile, Defeated Ōkawara won a seat in Tokyo PR block. After the election, Odawara was re-appointed to the State Minister for Foreign Affairs in the Second Kishida cabinet.

On 4 August 2022, when Nancy Pelosi, Speaker of the United States House of Representatives, arrived at the U.S. Yokota base for a visit to Japan, Odawara represented the Japanese government as State Minister for Foreign Affairs and welcomed her with Rahm Emanuel, U.S. Ambassador to Japan.

In the 2024 general election, on October 6, 2024, PM Ishiba decided not to nominate members who were suspended from their membership in the general election, including Odawara, because of the involvement in the slush fund scandal. So Odawara had to run as an independent. As a result, Odawara was defeated by Ōkawara (CDP) and lost the election due to the slush fund scandal and the 20 million yen scandal described later.

In the 2026 general election, Odawara was nominated by LDP and defeated other candidates to regain Tokyo 21st's seat.

== Scandal ==
=== Slush fund scandal ===
On 13 February 2024, LDP released the results of a survey of all Diet members belonging to the LDP over the slush fund scandal held by five LDP factions. It was revealed that Odawara used a total of 12.4 million yen as slush funds for five years as a kickback from the Seiwa Seisaku Kenkyūkai (Abe faction) for quota excess.

On 4 April 2024, LDP held the Party Ethics Committee meeting and decided to suspend Odawara from office for six months.

On 14 May 2024, the House of Representatives Political Ethics Committee unanimously passed the opposition's petition to attend and explain 44 LDP members who were involved in the slush fund scandal but did not explain themselves to the committee. On 17 May 2024, the House of Councillors Political Ethics Committee unanimously passed a petition for attendance and explanation to 29 members who had not made excuses. All 73 Diet members, including Odawara, refused to attend, and the ordinary Diet session was closed on 23 June 2024.

=== 20 million yen scandal ===
In the 2024 general election, Shimbun Akahata, daily newspaper published by JCP, reported that 20 million yen was paid to LDP branches headed by candidates, including Odawara, who were not nominated by LDP because of the involvement in the slush fund scandal.

Hiroshi Moriyama, LDP Secretary-General, admitted reports and explained that it was not to fund the election but to expand the party's position in the future. However, opposition parties pointed out that it was effectively providing campaign funds and criticized the scandal, saying, "LDP is not reflecting on the slush fund scandal."

In a street speech in Tachikawa, Tokyo, Odawara said, "20 million yen is not what we wanted. Even if money is transferred without permission and is now called political funds, I am just confused. I'm going to pay it back." In an interview after the speech, Odawara said, "I didn't know it was being transferred until the report came out. The camp staff are negotiating to return it to party headquarters today, but I heard that they refused because it was a donation from the party." Odawara also said, "It's annoying. The timing is too bad.", criticizing LDP headquarters.
