= Yoko Komiyama =

Japanese politician (born 1948)

- 小宮山 洋子
- Official portrait, 2010

Minister of State for Measures for Declining Birthrate
- In office 23 April 2012 – 1 October 2012
- Prime Minister: Yoshihiko Noda
- Preceded by: Masaharu Nakagawa
- Succeeded by: Ikko Nakatsuka

Minister of Health, Labour, and Welfare
- In office 2 September 2011 – 1 October 2012
- Prime Minister: Yoshihiko Noda
- Preceded by: Ritsuo Hosokawa
- Succeeded by: Wakio Mitsui

Member of the House of Representatives
- In office 27 April 2003 – 16 November 2012
- Preceded by: Kōki Ishii
- Succeeded by: Takao Ochi
- Constituency: Tokyo 6th (2003–2005); Tokyo PR (2005–2009); Tokyo 6th (2009–2012)

Member of the House of Councillors
- In office 26 July 1998 – 15 April 2003
- Preceded by: Multi-member district
- Succeeded by: Akio Nakajima
- Constituency: National PR

Personal details
- Born: 17 September 1948 (age 78) Shibuya, Tokyo, Japan
- Party: Democratic
- Parent: Ichirō Katō (father)
- Relatives: Kazuo Aoki (grandfather)
- Education: Seijo University

Yoko Komiyama (小宮山 洋子, Komiyama Yōko; born 17 September 1948) is a Japanese politician of the Democratic Party of Japan, a member of the House of Representatives in the Diet (national legislature).

== Early life ==
Komiyama is a native of Shibuya, Tokyo. She graduated from Seijo University, she worked at the public broadcaster NHK from 1972 to 1998.

== Political career ==
Komiyama was elected to the House of Councilors for the first time in 1998 and then to the House of Representatives for the first time in April 2003.

In September 2011 she was appointed Minister of Health, Labour and Welfare in the cabinet of newly appointed prime minister Yoshihiko Noda.

== Additional sources ==
- 政治家情報 〜小宮 at JANJAN

Political offices
| Preceded by Ritsuo Hosokawa | Minister of Health, Labour and Welfare; 2011–2012 | Succeeded by Wakio Mitsui |
| Preceded by Ritsuo Hosokawa; Hiroyuki Nagahama | Senior Vice Minister of Health, Labour and Welfare; 2010–2011; Served alongside: Osamu Fujimura, Kōhei Ōtsuka | Succeeded by N/A |
House of Representatives (Japan)
| Preceded by Takao Ochi | Representative for Tokyo 6th district 2009–present | Incumbent |
| Preceded by N/A | Representative for the Tōkyō PR block 2005–2009 | Succeeded by N/A |
| Vacant Title last held by Kōki Ishii | Representative for Tokyo 6th district 2003–2005 | Succeeded by Takao Ochi |
House of Councillors
| Preceded by N/A | Councillor by proportional representation 1998–2003 | Succeeded by N/A |
