= Yohei Matsumoto =

Japanese politician

- 松本 洋平
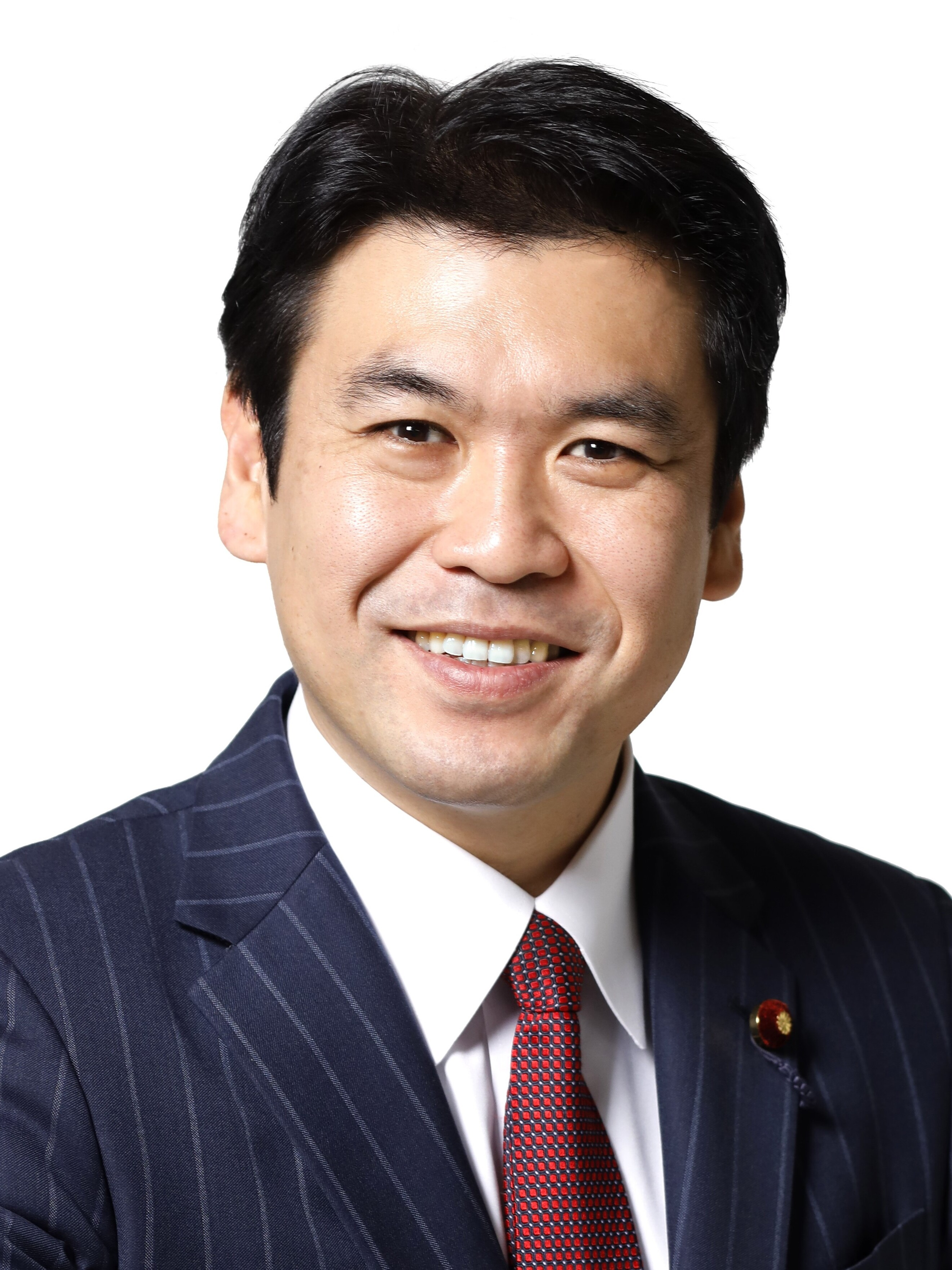
- Official portrait, 2019

Minister of Education, Culture, Sports, Science and Technology
- In office 21 October 2025 – 17 September 2026
- Prime Minister: Sanae Takaichi
- Preceded by: Toshiko Abe
- Succeeded by: Yoshihiro Seki

Member of the House of Representatives
- Incumbent
- Assumed office 19 December 2012
- Preceded by: Yoshinori Suematsu
- Constituency: Tokyo 19th (2012–2021); Tokyo PR (2021–2026); Tokyo 19th (2026–present)
- In office 11 September 2005 – 21 July 2009
- Preceded by: Yoshinori Suematsu
- Succeeded by: Yoshinori Suematsu
- Constituency: Tokyo 19th

Personal details
- Born: 31 August 1973 (age 53) Tokyo, Japan
- Party: Liberal Democratic
- Education: Keio University
- Website: http://www012.upp.so-net.ne.jp/yohei/index.html

Yohei Matsumoto (松本 洋平, Matsumoto Yōhei; born 31 August 1973) is a Japanese politician of the Liberal Democratic Party, a member of the House of Representatives in the Diet (national legislature) who has served as Minister of Education, Culture, Sports, Science and Technology since 21 October 2025.

== Early life ==
Matsumoto is a native of Setagaya, Tokyo and graduated from Keio University. He worked at Sanwa Bank, (now part of The Bank of Tokyo-Mitsubishi UFJ) from 1996 to 2003.

== Political career ==
Matsumoto was elected to the House of Representatives for the first time in 2005 after an unsuccessful run in 2003.

== Political positions ==
Matsumoto was a supporter of right-wing filmmaker Satoru Mizushima's 2007 revisionist film The Truth about Nanjing, which denied that the Nanjing Massacre ever occurred.
