= Fumiaki Matsumoto =

Japanese politician

- 松本 文明
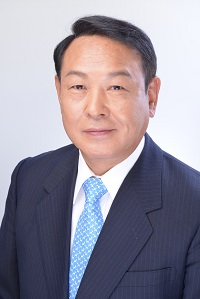
- Official portrait, 2017

Member of the House of Representatives
- In office 21 December 2012 – 14 October 2021
- Constituency: Tokyo PR
- In office 12 September 2005 – 21 July 2009
- Preceded by: Akira Nagatsuma
- Succeeded by: Akira Nagatsuma
- Constituency: Tokyo 7th

Member of the Tokyo Metropolitan Assembly
- In office 8 July 1985 – 2001
- Constituency: Nakano Ward

Personal details
- Born: 25 March 1949 (age 77) Kōzan, Hiroshima, Japan
- Party: Liberal Democratic
- Education: Meiji University

Fumiaki Matsumoto (松本 文明, Matsumoto Fumiaki; born 25 March 1949) is a former Japanese politician of the Liberal Democratic Party, who served as and a member of the House of Representatives in the Diet (national legislature). Matsumoto served as a vice minister for the Cabinet Office between August 2017 and January 2018. He resigned from his post after being recorded in the Diet mocking the gravity of US military helicopter accidents in Okinawa.

== Career ==
A native of Sera District, Hiroshima and a graduate of Meiji University, he was elected to the House of Representatives for the first time in 1985. After losing his seat in 2003, he was re-elected in 2005.

His profile on the LDP website:

- Former member of the Metropolitan Assembly
- Member, Committee on Audit and Oversight of Administration
- Member, Special Committee on Disasters
- Director, Committee on Land, Infrastructure, Transport and Tourism

== Positions ==
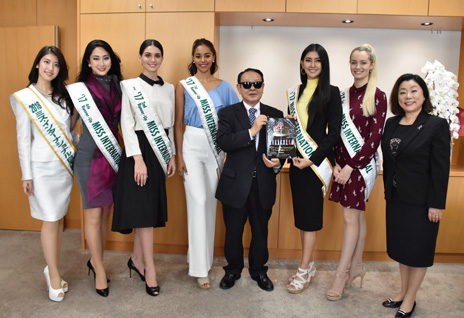
With delegates of the Miss International 2017 (22 November 2017)

Matsumoto, who is affiliated with Nippon Kaigi, attended a party organized by the Tokyo branch of the openly revisionist lobby to celebrate the Shinzō Abe cabinet, where the Imperial Rising Sun Flag was flown, the "Kimigayo" sung, and the pledge to "break away from the post-war regime" renewed.

Matsumoto gave the following answers to the questionnaire submitted by Mainichi to parliamentarians in 2012:

- in favor of the revision of the Constitution
- in favor of right of collective self-defense (revision of Article 9)
- in favor of reform of the National assembly (unicameral instead of bicameral)
- in favor of the reactivation of nuclear plants
- against the goal of zero nuclear power by 2030s
- in favor of the relocation of Marine Corps Air Station Futenma (Okinawa)
- in favor of evaluating the purchase of Senkaku Islands by the Government
- in favor of a strong attitude versus China
- against the reform of the Imperial Household that would allow women to retain their Imperial status even after marriage
- against the participation of Japan to the Trans-Pacific Partnership
- against a nuclear-armed Japan

== Sources ==
- 政治家情報 〜松本 文明〜. JANJAN ザ･選挙 (in Japanese).
