= Ritsuo Hosokawa =

Japanese politician

Yoko Komiyama
- 細川律夫
- Official portrait, 2009

Minister of Health, Labour and Welfare
- In office 17 September 2010 – 2 September 2011
- Prime Minister: Naoto Kan
- Preceded by: Akira Nagatsuma
- Succeeded by: Yoko Komiyama

Member of the House of Representatives; from Northern Kanto
- In office 19 February 1990 – 16 November 2012
- Preceded by: Eiji Nonaka
- Succeeded by: Hitoshi Kikawada
- Constituency: See list: Saitama 4th (1990–1996); PR block (1996–2000); Saitama 3rd (2000–2005); PR block (2005–2009); Saitama 3rd (2009–2012)

Personal details
- Born: 8 August 1943 (age 83) Gohoku, Kōchi, Japan
- Party: Democratic (1998–2016)
- Other political affiliations: JSP (1990–1996); SDP (1996); DP (1996–1998)
- Education: Meiji University

Ritsuo Hosaka (細川 律夫, Hosakawa Ritsuo; born 8 August 1943) is a former Japanese politician of the Democratic Party of Japan (DPJ), who served as a member of the House of Representatives in the Diet (national legislature).

== Overviews ==
A native of Agawa District, Kōchi and graduate of Meiji University, he was elected to the House of Representatives for the first time in 1990 as a member of the Japan Socialist Party after unsuccessful runs in 1983 and 1986. In 1996 he participated in the formulation of the DPJ. Between 1990 and 2012, he represented either the 3rd District or the 4th District of Saitama prefecture.

Political offices
| Preceded by Akira Nagatsuma | Minister of Health, Labour and Welfare; 2010–2011 | Succeeded by Yoko Komiyama |
| Preceded by Hideaki Ōmura; Takao Watanabe | Senior Vice-Minister of Health, Labour and Welfare; 2009–2010; Served alongside: Hiroyuki Nagahama | Succeeded by Yoko Komiyama; Osamu Fujimura |
House of Representatives (Japan)
| Preceded by Hiroshi Imai | Representative for Saitama 3rd district 2000–2005; 2009–present | Succeeded by Hiroshi Imai |
| Preceded by Hiroshi Imai | Representative for Saitama 3rd district 2000–2005; 2009–present | Incumbent |
| Preceded by N/A | Representative for the Northern Kantō PR block 1996–2000; 2005–2009 | Succeeded by N/A |
| Preceded by Eiji Nonaka; Yatarō Mitsubayashi; Eisuke Yamada; Masahisa Aoki | Representative for Saitama 4th district (multi-member); 1990–1996; Served alongside: Yuriko Takeyama, Eisuke Yamada, Yatarō Mitsubayashi, Masahisa Aoki | District eliminated |
