= Akira Kasai =

Japanese politician

- 笠井 亮
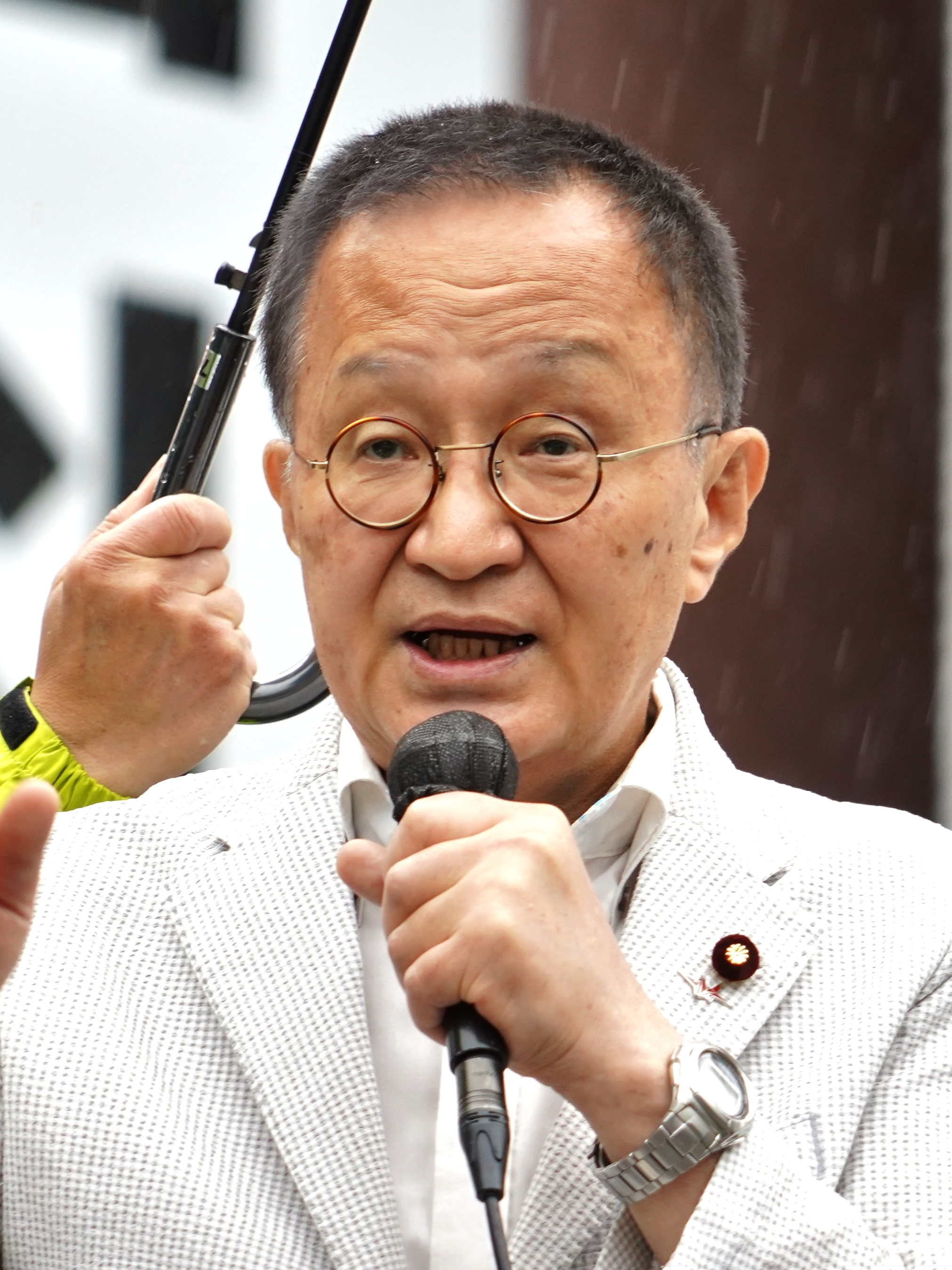
- Kasai in 2022

Member of the House of Representatives
- In office 11 September 2005 – 9 October 2024
- Constituency: Tokyo PR

Member of the House of Councillors
- In office 23 July 1995 – 22 July 2001
- Constituency: National PR

Personal details
- Born: 15 October 1952 (age 73) Suita, Osaka, Japan
- Party: Communist
- Education: University of Tokyo
- Website: kasai-akira.jp

Akira Kasai (笠井 亮, Kasai Akira) is a Japanese politician and a former member of the House of Representatives for the Japanese Communist Party. Kasai, a former policy chief of the JCP, is critical of the United States' intervention in the Syrian Civil War in absence of resolutions by the UN Security Council, saying that the actions are aggravating the civil war. He is supportive of normalizing Japan's relationship with North Korea, claiming that the issues with North Korea can only be solved by developing a dialogue and trust. He similarly thinks that Japan should push the United States to hold talks with North Korea to avert a war caused by accident or misunderstanding. Kasai is against the Trans-Pacific Partnership.
