= Yoshinori Suematsu =

Japanese politician

- 末松 義規
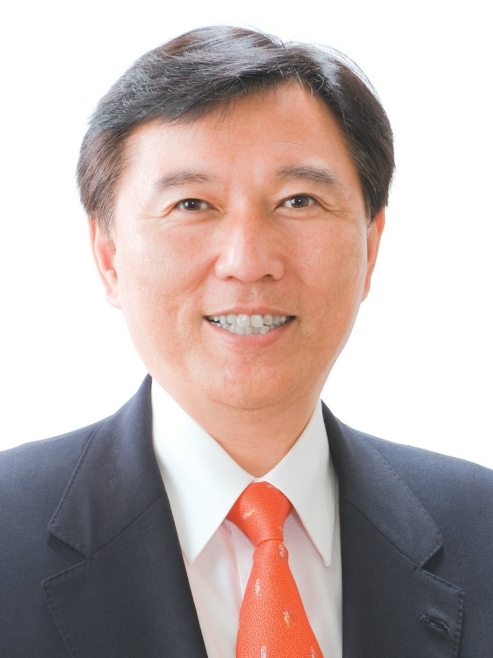
- Official portrait, 2011

Member of the House of Representatives
- In office 23 October 2017 – 23 January 2026
- Preceded by: Multi-member district
- Succeeded by: Yohei Matsumoto
- Constituency: Tokyo PR (2017–2021); Tokyo 19th (2021–2026)
- In office 20 October 1996 – 16 November 2012
- Preceded by: Constituency established
- Succeeded by: Yohei Matsumoto
- Constituency: Tokyo 19th (1996–2005); Tokyo PR (2005–2009); Tokyo 19th (2009–2012)

Personal details
- Born: 5 December 1956 (age 69) Yahatanishi-ku, Kitakyūshū, Fukuoka, Japan
- Party: CRA (since 2026)
- Other political affiliations: DP 1996 (1996–1998); DPJ (1998–2016); DP 2016 (2016–2017); CDP (2017–2026)
- Education: Hitotsubashi University; Princeton University
- Website: https://y-sue.net/

Yoshinori Suematsu (末松 義規, Suematsu Yoshinori; born 5 December 1956) is a Japanese politician of the Constitutional Democratic Party, who served as a member of the House of Representatives in the Diet (national legislature).

== Biography ==
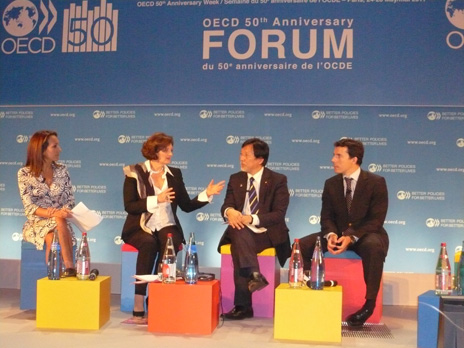
Suematsu with Stéphanie Antoine, Cherie Blair and Carlos Mulas Granados (at the Château de la Muette on 24 May 2011)

A native of Kitakyūshū and graduate of Hitotsubashi University, he joined the Ministry of Foreign Affairs in 1980, receiving a master's degree from Princeton University while in the ministry. Leaving the ministry in 1994, he was elected to the House of Representatives for the first time in 1996.
