= Hitoshi Kikawada =

Japanese politician (born 1970)

- 黄川田 仁志
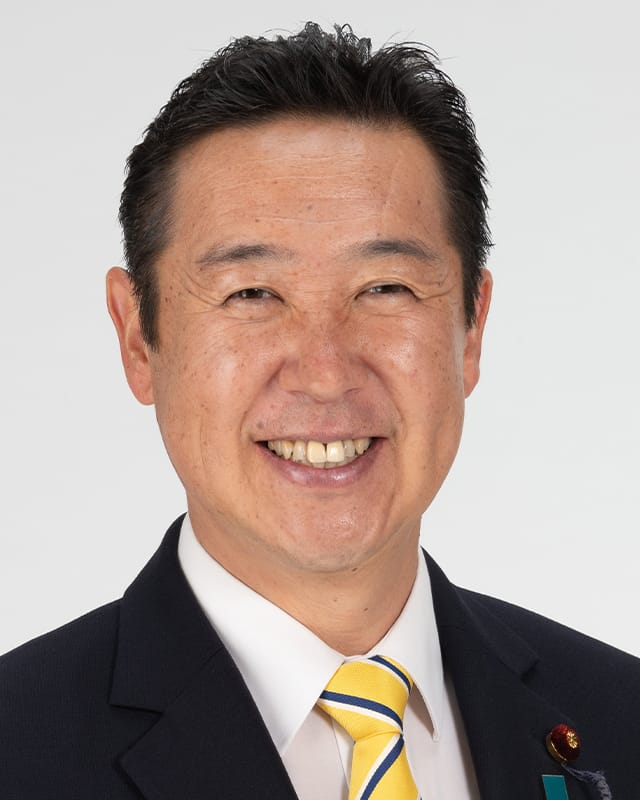
- Official portrait, 2024

Minister of State for Okinawa and Northern Territories Affairs
- Incumbent
- Assumed office 21 October 2025
- Prime Minister: Sanae Takaichi
- Preceded by: Yoshitaka Itō

Member of the House of Representatives
- Incumbent
- Assumed office 16 December 2012
- Preceded by: Ritsuo Hosokawa
- Constituency: Saitama 3rd

Personal details
- Born: 13 October 1970 (age 56) Setagaya, Tokyo, Japan
- Party: Liberal Democratic
- Education: Tokyo University of Science; University of Osaka

Hitoshi Kikawada (黄川田仁志, Kikawada Hitoshi; born 13 October 1970) is a Japanese politician serving as a member of the House of Representatives since 2012. From 2022 to 2023, he served as chairman of the foreign affairs committee.
