= Makoto Tanabe =

Japanese politician

- 田邊 誠
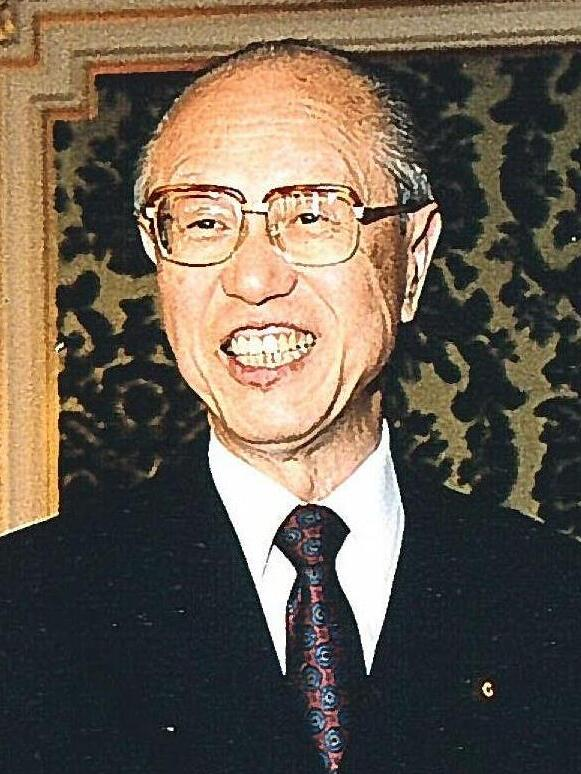
- Tanabe in 1992

Chairman of the Japan Socialist Party
- In office 31 July 1991 – 19 January 1993
- Preceded by: Takako Doi
- Succeeded by: Sadao Yamahana

Member of the House of Representatives
- In office 30 January 1967 – 27 September 1996
- Preceded by: Shigemitsu Akanegakubo
- Succeeded by: Constituency abolished
- Constituency: Gunma 1st
- In office 21 November 1960 – 23 October 1963
- Preceded by: Shigemitsu Akanegakubo
- Succeeded by: Shigemitsu Akanegakubo
- Constituency: Gunma 1st

Member of the Gunma Prefectural Assembly
- In office 23 April 1955 – March 1959
- Constituency: Maebashi City

Personal details
- Born: 25 February 1922 Maebashi, Gunma, Japan
- Died: 2 July 2015 (aged 93) Maebashi, Gunma, Japan
- Party: Socialist
- Other political affiliations: SDP (1996–1997); DP (1997–1998)

Makoto Tanabe (田邊 誠; 25 February 1922 – 2 July 2015) was the chairman of the former Japan Socialist Party, now known as the Social Democratic Party of Japan. He was elected to the position in 1991. Tanabe was from the right wing of the party and was a reformer. He served in the Japanese House of Representatives 11 times. Tanabe was a supporter of giving Japanese aide to deal with the lack of food in North Korea. He was also supportive of apologizing for Japan's behaviour during World War II and of giving reparations to those in Asian countries. He died on 2 July 2015, at the age of 93.
