= Saitama 3rd district =

Legislative district of Japan

- Parliamentary constituency for the Japanese House of Representatives
- Numbered map of Saitama Prefecture single-member districts
- Prefecture: Saitama
- Proportional District: Northern Kanto
- Electorate: 382,105

Current constituency
- Created: 1994
- Seats: One
- Party: Liberal Democratic
- Representative: Hitoshi Kikawada
- Municipalities: Part of Kawaguchi and Koshigaya.

Saitama 3rd district (埼玉県第3区 Saitama-ken dai-sanku or simply 埼玉3区 Saitama 3-ku) is a constituency of the House of Representatives in the Diet of Japan. It is located in Southeastern Saitama and consists of the cities of Kawaguchi and Koshigaya. As of 2012, 460,884 eligible voters were registered in the district.

Before the electoral reform of 1994, Sōka was part of the 1st district where three Representatives had been elected by single non-transferable vote, and Koshigaya part of Saitama 4th district (four Representatives).

Between 1996 and 2009, the district had been closely contested between former Sōka mayor Hiroshi Imai (now LDP, Koga faction) who was first elected as JNP candidate from the old 1st district in 1993, and Ex-Socialist Ritsuo Hosokawa (now DPJ, Kan group) who is originally from Kōchi Prefecture but had represented the old 4th district for the JSP since 1990. After his 2009 defeat Imai retired from politics. Hosokawa went on to serve in the DPJ-led cabinets as vice minister and minister. However, in the landslide Democratic defeat in 2012, he lost the district to Liberal Democratic newcomer Hitoshi Kikawada and also failed to win a proportional seat.

== List of representatives ==
Election	Representative	Party	Notes
1996	Hiroshi Imai	New Frontier	
1996	Hiroshi Imai	Liberal Democratic	
2000	Ritsuo Hosokawa	Democratic	
2003	Ritsuo Hosokawa	Democratic	
2005	Hiroshi Imai	Liberal Democratic	
2009	Ritsuo Hosokawa	Democratic	
2012	Hitoshi Kikawada	Liberal Democratic	
2014	Hitoshi Kikawada	Liberal Democratic	
2017	Hitoshi Kikawada	Liberal Democratic	
2021	Hitoshi Kikawada	Liberal Democratic	
2024	Hitoshi Kikawada	Liberal Democratic	
2026	Hitoshi Kikawada	Liberal Democratic	

== Election results ==
=== 2026 ===
2026
Party	Candidate	Votes	%	±%
LDP	Hitoshi Kikawada	96,335	52.2	▲10.2
Centrist Reform	Chiharu Takeuchi	60,430	32.7	▼3.7
Sanseitō	Naoko Nakamura	27,801	15.1	
Registered electors		379,284		
Turnout			49.93	▲0.70
LDP hold				

=== 2024 ===
2024
Party	Candidate	Votes	%	±%
Liberal Democratic (endorsed by Komeito)	Hitoshi Kikawada (incumbent)	76,239	42.00	▼11.63
CDP	Chiharu Takeuchi (elected in N. Kanto PR)	66,103	36.42	▼6.73
Innovation	Takami Ishikawa	24,442	13.47	New
Communist	Hiroshi Baba	14,731	8.12	New
Majority		10,136	5.58	▼4.90
Registered electors		380,188		
Turnout		181,515	49.23	▼2.65
LDP hold				

=== 2021 ===
2021
Party	Candidate	Votes	%	±%
Liberal Democratic (endorsed by Komeito)	Hitoshi Kikawada (incumbent)	125,500	53.63	
CDP	Yuriko Yamakawa (PR seat incumbent)	100,963	43.15	New
Anti-NHK	Yusuke Kawai	7,534	3.22	New
Majority		24,537	10.48	
Registered electors		462,607		
Turnout			51.88	▲3.60
LDP hold				

=== 2017 ===
2017
Party	Candidate	Votes	%	±%
Liberal Democratic (endorsed by Komeito)	Hitoshi Kikawada (incumbent)	95,093	44.62	
CDP	Yuriko Yamakawa (won PR seat)	73,250	34.37	New
Kibō no Tō	Asami Miwa	29,867	14.01	New
Innovation	Kanji Yakō	10,864	5.10	New
Independent	Hideyuki Ishikawa	2,040	0.96	New
Happiness Realization	Takeshi Iida	2,009	0.94	N/A
Majority		21,843	10.25	
Registered electors		453,235		
Turnout			48.28	▼0.43
LDP hold				

=== 2014 ===
2014
Party	Candidate	Votes	%	±%
Liberal Democratic (endorsed by Komeito)	Hitoshi Kikawada (incumbent)	107,986	49.64	
Democratic	Ritsuo Hosokawa	75,715	34.80	
Communist	Masayuki Miyagawa	33,858	15.56	
Majority		32,271	14.84	
Registered electors		465,154		
Turnout			48.71	▼7.01
LDP hold				

2012
Party	Candidate	Votes	%	±%
LDP (Kōmeitō)	Hitoshi Kikawada	87,695	35.5	
DPJ (PNP)	Ritsuo Hosokawa	58,590	23.7	
JRP	Kanji Yakou	46,136	18.7	
YP	Eiji Miyase	37,034	15.0	
JCP	Shin'ichi Hirose	17,346	7.0	

2009
Party	Candidate	Votes	%	±%
DPJ (PNP support)	Ritsuo Hosokawa	167,432	60.0	
LDP (Kōmeitō support)	Hiroshi Imai	103,369	37.1	
HRP	Takeshi Iida	8,194	2.9	
Turnout		287,403	63.63	

2005
Party	Candidate	Votes	%	±%
LDP	Hiroshi Imai	140,010	51.3	
DPJ	Ritsuo Hosokawa (elected by PR)	109,816	40.3	
JCP	Isamu Matsuzawa	22,912	8.4	
Turnout		278,602	63.16	

2003
Party	Candidate	Votes	%	±%
DPJ	Ritsuo Hosokawa	104,182	46.4	
LDP	Hiroshi Imai (elected by PR)	103,588	46.1	
JCP	Tsutomu Tamura	16,703	7.4	
Turnout		228,724	52.44	

2000
Party	Candidate	Votes	%	±%
DPJ	Ritsuo Hosokawa	105,054	47.0	
LDP	Hiroshi Imai	87,344	39.1	
JCP	Tsutomu Tamura	30,997	13.9	

,

1996
Party	Candidate	Votes	%	±%
NFP	Hiroshi Imai	63,841	31.4	
LDP	Takuji Noguchi	54,703	26.9	
DPJ	Ritsuo Hosokawa (elected by PR)	45,400	22.3	
JCP	Jin Kumaki	25,792	12.7	
Independent	Toyoji Inoue	13,524	6.7	
Turnout		207,366	51.53	
