= Yuichi Ogawa =

Japanese politician (1946–2024)

- 小川 友一

Member of the House of Representatives
- In office 11 September 2005 – 21 July 2009
- Preceded by: Akihisa Nagashima
- Succeeded by: Akihisa Nagashima
- Constituency: Tokyo 21st

Member of the Hino City Council
- In office 1990–2005

Personal details
- Born: 27 February 1946 Hino, Tokyo, Japan
- Died: 14 January 2024 (aged 77) Hino, Tokyo, Japan
- Party: Liberal Democratic
- Education: Nihon University

Yuichi Ogawa (小川 友一, Ogawa Yūichi; 27 February 1946 – 14 January 2024) was a Japanese politician of the Liberal Democratic Party, who served as a member of the House of Representatives in the Diet (national legislature). A native of Hino, Tokyo and graduate of Nihon University, he was elected to the city assembly of Hino for the first time in 1990 where he served for four terms and then to the House of Representatives for the first time in 2005. Ogawa died on 14 January 2024, at the age of 77.

== Sources ==
- 政治家情報 〜小川 友一〜. JANJAN ザ･選挙 (in Japanese).
