= Tokyo 7th district =

Japan House of Representatives constituency

Tokyo 7th District
- Parliamentary constituency for the Japanese House of Representatives
- Numbered map of inner Tokyo single-member districts
- Prefecture: Tokyo
- Proportional District: Tokyo

Current constituency
- Created: 1994
- Seats: One
- Party: LDP
- Representative: Tamayo Marukawa
- Wards: Shibuya, Minato

Tokyo 7th district is a constituency of the House of Representatives in the Diet of Japan. The district is in central Tokyo and encompasses the entire wards of Shibuya and Minato.

== Background ==
The district is considered a stronghold for former Health Minister Akira Nagatsuma, who grew into prominence from investigating the 2007 pensions mishandling scandal and wider misuse of public funds. Nagatsuma has been elected almost continuously since 2000, save for the 2005 Koizumi landslide where he was only returned through the proportional representation block. Nagatsuma regained the district in the 2009 landslide that brought the Democratic Party of Japan (DPJ) into power. Despite facing strong headwinds in the 2012 and 2014 LDP landslide, he managed to hold on to his seat. He was the only opposition lawmaker winning a single-seat constituency in Tokyo in the 2014 election.

Nagatsuma retained his seat in the 2017 election that was preceded by a split in the Democratic Party (DP). Nagatsuma along with liberal-leaning members of the DP like Yukio Edano and Hirotaka Akamatsu founded the CDP. He was challenged in the election by his regular LDP rival Fumiaki Matsumoto. The party housing conservative former DP members, Kibō no Tō also fielded a candidate. Akihiro Araki, the husband of Tomin First no Kai leader Chiharu Araki, was chosen to contest the seat for Kibō. Nagatsuma comfortably won his seat and increased his majority amidst a CDP surge that also resulted in gains by the party across Tokyo. Following the 2022 appaportionment, the district now covers all of Shibuya and Minato, with the former portions of the district covering Shinagawa, Meguro and Nakano being moved into other districts.

== List of representatives ==
Representative	Party	Dates	Notes
Shigeru Kasuya	LDP	1996 – 2000	
Akira Nagatsuma	DPJ	2000 – 2005	
Fumiaki Matsumoto	LDP	2005 – 2009	
Akira Nagatsuma	DPJ	2009 – 2016	
Akira Nagatsuma	DP	2016 – 2017	
Akira Nagatsuma	CDP	2017 – 2024	
Akihiro Matsuo	CDP	2024 – 2026	
Tamayo Marukawa	LDP	2026 –	

== Election results ==
2026
Party	Candidate	Votes	%	±%
LDP	Tamayo Marukawa	80,421	34.5	▲7.4
Centrist Reform	Akihiro Matsuo	52,576	22.5	▼19.4
Team Mirai	Yūya Mineshima (elected by PR)	43,335	18.6	
DPP	Nobuko Irie	21,018	9.0	
Ishin	Yasuyuki Watanabe	19,637	8.4	▼14.5
Sanseitō	Yurika Ishikawa	16,337	7.0	▼1.1
Turnout			59.21	▲5.91
LDP gain from Centrist Reform				

2024
Party	Candidate	Votes	%	±%
CDP	Akihiro Matsuo	86,252	41.89%	▼7.36
LDP	Tamayo Marukawa	55,848	27.13%	▼4.93
Ishin	Taisuke Ono	47,196	22.92%	▲7.98
Sanseitō	Yurika Ishikawa	16,588	8.06%	New
Turnout		205,884	53.30%	▼3.17

2021
Party	Candidate	Votes	%	±%
CDP	Akira Nagatsuma	124,541	49.25	▼1.27
LDP	Fumiaki Matsumoto ( endorsed by Kōmeitō)	81,087	32.06	▼4.74
Ishin	Kentarō Tsuji	37,781	14.94	
Independent	Hiroshi Komiyama	5,665	2.24	
Anti-NHK	Keiji Ino	3,822	1.51	
Majority			17.19	▲5.47
Turnout			56.47	▲3.61
CDP hold		Swing	▲1.80	

2017
Party	Candidate	Votes	%	±%
CDP	Akira Nagatsuma	117,118	50.52	▲5.91
LDP	Fumiaki Matsumoto (elected by PR, endorsed by Kōmeitō)	85,305	36.80	▲1.14
Kibō no Tō	Akihiro Araki	25,531	11.01	N/A
Independent	Ikuma Inoue	3,850	1.66	N/A
Majority		32.813	13.72	
Turnout			52.86	▼0.27
CDP hold		Swing	▲2.39	

2014
Party	Candidate	Votes	%	±%
Democratic	Akira Nagatsuma (endorsed by JIP)	104,422	44.61	▲6.16
LDP	Fumiaki Matsumoto (elected by PR, endorsed by Kōmeitō)	83,476	35.66	▲5.69
JCP	Noriaki Ōta	27,866	11.90	▲4.51
Future Generations	Kōichirō Yoshida	18,332	7.83	▼9.44
Majority		20,946	8.95	
Turnout			53.13	▼7.95
Democratic hold		Swing	▲0.24	

2012
Party	Candidate	Votes	%	±%
Democratic	Akira Nagatsuma (endorsed by PNP)	100,872	38.25	▼23.01
LDP	Fumiaki Matsumoto (elected by PR, endorsed by NKP)	79,048	29.97	▲0.90
Restoration	Kōichirō Yoshida	45,556	17.27	N/A
JCP	Noriaki Ōta	19,495	7.39	▼1.40
Tomorrow	Kōzō Okamoto (endorsed by NPD)	17,437	6.61	N/A
Independent	Teikichi Nishino	1,315	0.50	N/A
Majority		21,824	8.28	
Turnout			61.08	▼2.23
Democratic hold		Swing	▼11.96	

2009
Party	Candidate	Votes	%	±%
Democratic	Akira Nagatsuma	167,905	61.26	▲19.14
LDP	Fumiaki Matsumoto (endorsed by NKP)	79,686	29.07	▼19.84
JCP	Noriaki Ōta	24,103	8.79	▼0.18
Happiness Realization	Kazuya Daimon	2,401	0.88	N/A
Majority		88,219	32.19	
Turnout			63.31	▲0.23
Democratic gain from LDP		Swing	▲19.49	

2005
Party	Candidate	Votes	%	±%
LDP	Fumiaki Matsumoto	131,464	48.91	
Democratic	Akira Nagatsuma (elected by PR)	113,221	42.12	
JCP	Noriaki Ōta	17,140	8.97	
Majority			63.08	
LDP gain from Democratic		Swing		

2003
Party	Candidate	Votes	%	±%
Democratic	Akira Nagatsuma	99,891	43.1	
LDP	Fumiaki Matsumoto	83,588	36.0	
JCP	Tetsuo Ozawa	21,982	9.5	
Independent	Hajime Yabe	14,743	6.4	
Club of Independents	Takashi Fube	11,778	5.1	

2000
Party	Candidate	Votes	%	±%
Democratic	Akira Nagatsuma	82,502	35.7	
LDP	Shigeru Kasuya	77,407	35.5	
JCP	Isamu Ozeki	37,380	16.2	
Liberal	Seiichi Suetsugu	25,910	11.2	
Tokyo New	Taizō Shibano	7,830	3.4	

1996
Party	Candidate	Votes	%	±%
LDP	Shigeru Kasuya	65,332	30.2	
Democratic	Tatsu Miki	57,220	26.4	
New Frontier	Toshikazu Higuchi	47,241	21.8	
JCP	Kiyoshi Kamei	39,049	18.0	
New Socialist	Hideaki Ebara	7,557	3.5	
