= Eri Igarashi =

Japanese politician (born 1984)

- 五十嵐 衣里
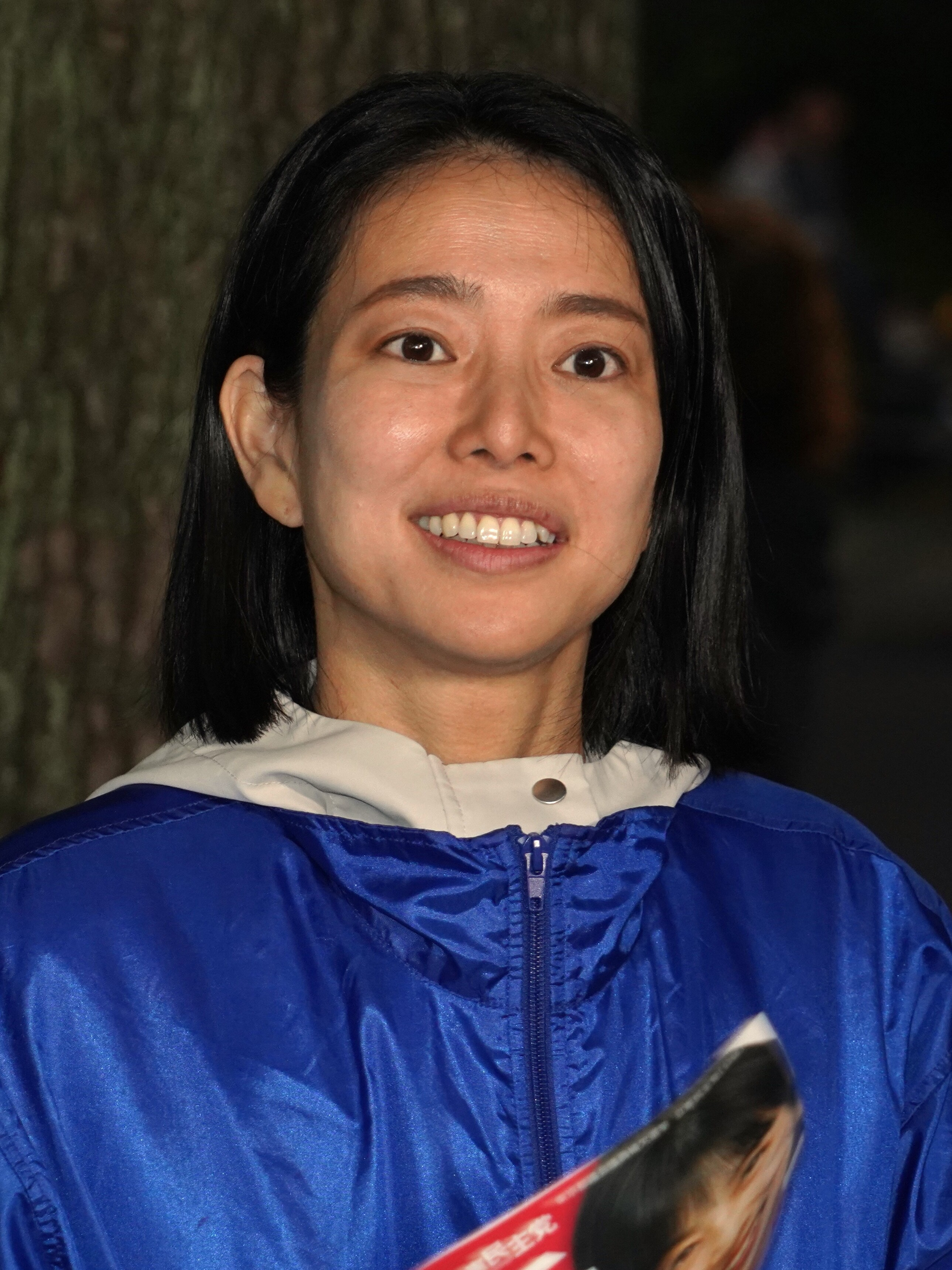
- Igarashi in 2024

Member of the House of Representatives
- In office 27 October 2024 – 23 January 2026
- Preceded by: Constituency established
- Succeeded by: Akihisa Nagashima
- Constituency: Tokyo 30th

Member of the Tokyo Metropolitan Assembly
- In office 23 July 2021 – 4 October 2024
- Constituency: Musashino City

Personal details
- Born: 19 January 1984 (age 42) Nagoya, Aichi, Japan
- Party: CRA (since 2026)
- Other political affiliations: CDP (2021–2024)
- Education: Shizuoka University; Nagoya University

Eri Igarashi (五十嵐衣里, Igarashi Eri; born 19 January 1984) is a Japanese politician who served as a member of the House of Representatives from 2024 to 2026. From 2021 to 2024, she was a member of the Tokyo Metropolitan Assembly. She gave birth while in office on 2 October 2025.
