= Akira Nagatsuma =

Japanese politician (born 1960)

- 長妻 昭
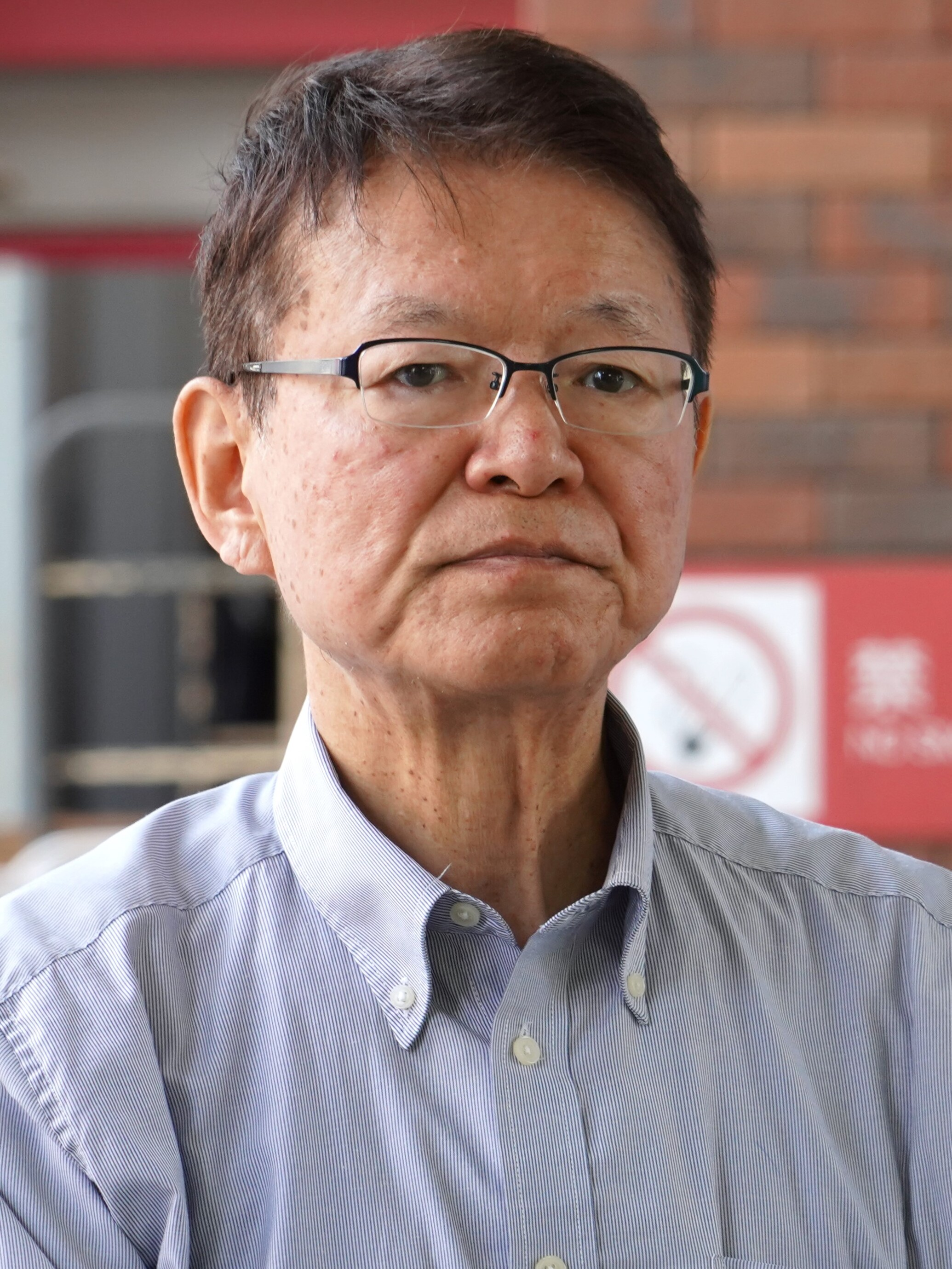
- Nagatsuma in 2025

Executive Deputy President of the Constitutional Democratic Party
- In office 24 September 2024 – 11 September 2025
- Leader: Yoshihiko Noda
- Preceded by: Seiji Osaka
- Succeeded by: Shoichi Kondo
- In office 2 October 2017 – 15 September 2020
- Leader: Yukio Edano
- Preceded by: Position established
- Succeeded by: Hirofumi Hirano

Chairman of the Policy Bureau Constitutional Democratic Party
- In office 26 August 2022 – 24 September 2024
- Leader: Kenta Izumi
- Preceded by: Junya Ogawa
- Succeeded by: Kazuhiko Shigetoku

Minister of Health, Labour and Welfare
- In office 16 September 2009 – 17 September 2010
- Prime Minister: Yukio Hatoyama; Naoto Kan
- Preceded by: Yōichi Masuzoe
- Succeeded by: Ritsuo Hosokawa

Member of the House of Representatives; from Tokyo
- Incumbent
- Assumed office 25 June 2000
- Preceded by: Shigeru Kasuya
- Constituency: See list: 7th district (2000–2005); PR block (2005–2009); 7th district (2009–2024); 27th district (2024–2026); PR block (2026–present)

Personal details
- Born: 14 June 1960 (age 66) Nerima, Tokyo, Japan
- Party: DRP (since 2026)
- Other political affiliations: Heisei Restoration Association (1992–1995); NPS (1995–1996); DP (1996–1998); DPJ (1998–2016); DP (2016–2017); CDP (2017–2026); CRA (2026)
- Children: 3
- Education: Keio University
- Website: Official website

Akira Nagatsuma (長妻 昭, Nagatsuma Akira; born 14 June 1960) is a Japanese politician of the Constitutional Democratic Party of Japan (CDP), a member of House of Representatives in the Diet (national legislature). Nagatsuma is currently the deputy leader and the head of the Tokyo chapter of the CDP. He had served as the Minister of Health, Labour and Welfare in the Hatoyama and Kan administration. He came to prominence when he reported missing records of public pension plans. A native of Nerima, Tokyo and graduate of Keio University, he was elected for the first time in 2000 after unsuccessful runs in 1995 and 1996.

== Political career ==
=== DPJ years ===
Nagatsuma gained nationwide prominence after exposing scandals involving Japan's bureaucracy, including widespread mishandling of the national pension records and the misuse of public funds for kickbacks. He earned the nickname Mr Pension for his investigations into these scandals.

His experience and expertise on pensions led him to be appointed to the Minister of Health, Labour and Welfare during the administrations of Prime Ministers Yukio Hatoyama and Naoto Kan. After Prime Minister Kan's first cabinet reshuffle, he moved to the DPJ party leadership and became the first vice secretary-general of the party. He continued to be active in the Diet after leaving his cabinet post and became the chairman of the Welfare and Labour Committee in the House of Representatives in 2012.

In December the same year, a general election was held and the LDP returned into power. Amidst large swings against the DPJ, Nagatsuma managed to hold his seat. Nagatsuma and Akihisa Nagashima were the only DPJ representatives in Tokyo to win single-seat constituencies in the election. Nagashima was defeated in his district in 2014, leaving Nagatsuma as the only DPJ member with a constituency seat in Tokyo.

Nagatsuma continued to rise through the ranks of the party after the 2012 defeat. He became DPJ's deputy secretary-general in May 2013. After then-party leader Banri Kaieda was defeated in the 2014 election, Nagatsuma entered the race to succeed him, but lost to Katsuya Okada. Okada then appointed Nagatsuma to be the party's deputy leader, a position he held even after the merger with Japan Innovation Party.

After the election of Seiji Maehara as a president of the post-merger Democratic Party (DP) in September 2017, Nagatsuma was appointed as the party's election campaign committee and its Tokyo chapter chairman.

=== Formation of the CDP ===
Less than three weeks after the conclusion of the leadership race, Prime Minister Shinzo Abe called for a snap general election in October. Earlier on the day of the PM's declaration, Tokyo governor Yuriko Koike formed Kibō no Tō, intended to be a conservative alternative to the LDP. Many conservative-leaning DP members migrated en masse to Kibō after Maehara allowed DP members to run in the election under Kibō's banner. However, Koike imposed an ideological test that effectively barred liberal DP members from joining Kibō. This spurred DP deputy president Yukio Edano to form the CDP just three weeks before the election. Nagatsuma, a founding member, was tapped as the party's deputy leader.

The burgeoning CDP campaign received a surge of support in the run-up to election day. CDP made significant gains in the election across the country, becoming the country's largest opposition party. The surge was also replicated in Tokyo, where the campaign was led by Nagatsuma. LDP's majorities were cut in seats where CDP were contesting. Some were overturned, as in the case of former DPJ leaders Kan and Kaieda, who contested under the CDP banner and regained their seats. After the election, Nagatsuma became the CDP's Tokyo chapter head.

Following the 2025 Tokyo prefectural election, 5 independents joined the CDP caucus, making the party the second-largest party in the Assembly, only behind Tomin First and ahead of the LDP.

Political offices
Preceded by Yōichi Masuzoe	Minister of Health, Labour and Welfare of Japan; 2009–2010	Succeeded by Ritsuo Hosokawa
House of Representatives (Japan)
Preceded by Shigeru Kasuya	Representative for Tokyo 7th district 2000–2005	Succeeded by Fumiaki Matsumoto
Preceded by N/A	Representative for the Tōkyō PR block 2005–2009	Succeeded by N/A
Preceded by Fumiaki Matsumoto	Representative for Tokyo 7th district 2009–24	Succeeded by Akihiro Matsuo
