= Sadao Yamahana =

Japanese politician (1936–1999)

- 山花 貞夫
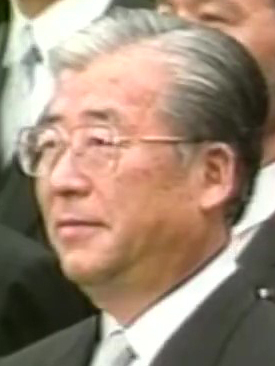
- Yamahana in 1993

Minister in charge of Political Reform
- In office 9 August 1993 – 28 April 1994
- Prime Minister: Morihiro Hosokawa
- Preceded by: Office established
- Succeeded by: Hajime Ishii

Chairman of the Japan Socialist Party
- In office 19 January 1993 – 25 September 1993
- Preceded by: Makoto Tanabe
- Succeeded by: Tomiichi Murayama

Member of the House of Representatives
- In office 10 December 1976 – 14 July 1999
- Preceded by: Constituency established
- Succeeded by: Osamu Shibutani
- Constituency: Tokyo 11th (1976–1996); Tokyo PR (1996–1999)

Personal details
- Born: 26 February 1936 Tokyo, Japan
- Died: 14 July 1999 (aged 63) Mitaka, Tokyo, Japan
- Party: Socialist
- Other political affiliations: Independent (1995–1996); DP (1996–1998); DPJ (1998–1999)
- Children: Ikuo Yamahana
- Parent: Hideo Yamahana (father)
- Education: Chuo University

Sadao Yamahana (山花 貞夫, Yamahana Sadao; 26 February 1936 – 14 July 1999) was a Japanese politician who served as chairman of the Japan Socialist Party from January 1993 to September 1993.

Yamahana led his party into coalition with other opposition parties to form the first non-LDP cabinet since 1955, led by Prime Minister Morihiro Hosokawa. Yamahana served as Minister in charge of political reform in the same cabinet. Yamahana later left the Socialists and became a founding member of the Democratic Party.

== Biography ==
Sadao Yamahana was born on February 26, 1936, the day of the February 26 incident, in Tokyo. His father Hideo Yamahana was a labour activist who was arrested several times for alleged subversion during Sadao's early childhood in the wartime period. After the surrender of Japan, Hideo became a founding member of the Japan Socialist Party and was elected to the National Diet.

Sadao Yamahana studied law at Chuo University, graduating in 1958. As a lawyer he served on the legal team of the Japan Socialist Party and the Sohyo. After his father's retirement, Yamahana was elected in the 1976 House of Representatives election from Tokyo's 11th district as a member of the JSP.

Yamahana became Secretary-General of the JSP under Chairman Makoto Tanabe in July 1991. He succeeded Tanabe as chairman in January 1993. In July of the same year the JSP supported a motion of no confidence against the Liberal Democratic Party cabinet led by Kiichi Miyazawa. This motion passed due to support from the Hata-Ozawa faction of the LDP. This triggered the July 1993 House of Representatives election. Before the election, Yamahana agreed to have the JSP participate in a bloc with various opposition parties, masterminded by Ichiro Ozawa, to overthrow the LDP and implement political reform.

The election was disastrous for the JSP, losing half of their seats. However, enough seats were won by opposition parties that a non-LDP government could be formed for the first time since 1955. Although the JSP were still the largest party in the coalition, Yamahana was not considered for prime minister due to the dissatisfaction shown by the large loss of seats. Instead the post went to Morihiro Hosokawa while Yamahana became Minister in charge of political reform. Yamahana resigned as chairman of the JSP in September to take responsibility for the election result, while remaining in the cabinet.

After some time, the socialists became increasingly dissatisfied with the dominance of Ichiro Ozawa within the coalition. Yamahana left cabinet along with the resignation of Hosokawa in April 1994. The JSP declined to support the subsequent cabinet led by Tsutomu Hata. In June 1994 the JSP and the LDP formed a coalition with Yamahana's successor as party chairman, Tomiichi Murayama, as prime minister.

Yamahana was critical of this arrangement. In late 1994, he formed his own faction in the JSP called the New Democratic Union. In early 1995, he aimed to formed a new party together with JSP Secretary General Wataru Kubo and others. Had it been realised it would've likely put an end to the Murayama Cabinet, but when the Great Hanshin earthquake occurred the plans were scrapped as it was not a time to cause political turmoil. Yamahana himself left the JSP in May 1995. He joined the Democratic Party of Japan when it was formed in September 1996.

Sadao Yamahana died on 14 July 1999. His son Ikuo Yamahana is also a member of the House of Representatives.

Political offices
Position established	Minister in charge of Political Reform; 1993–1994	Succeeded by Hajime Ishii
Party political offices
Preceded by Makoto Tanabe	Chairman of the Japan Socialist Party; 1993	Succeeded by Tomiichi Murayama
Preceded by Tsuruo Yamaguchi	Secretary-General of the Japan Socialist Party; 1991-1993	Succeeded by Hirotaka Akamatsu
