= Takao Ochi =

Japanese politician

- 越智 隆雄
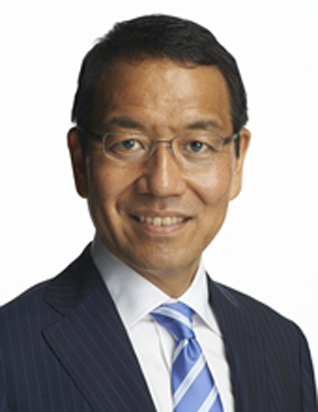
- Official portrait, 2017

Member of the House of Representatives
- In office 19 December 2012 – 9 October 2024
- Preceded by: Yoko Komiyama
- Succeeded by: Multi-member district
- Constituency: Tokyo 6th (2012–2017); Tokyo PR (2017–2024)
- In office 11 September 2005 – 21 July 2009
- Preceded by: Yoko Komiyama
- Succeeded by: Yoko Komiyama
- Constituency: Tokyo 6th

Personal details
- Born: 27 February 1964 (age 62) Setagaya, Tokyo, Japan
- Party: Liberal Democratic
- Education: Keio University; École Supérieure des Sciences Économiques et Commerciales; University of Tokyo

Takao Ochi (越智 隆雄, Ochi Takao; born 27 February 1964) is a former Japanese politician of the Liberal Democratic Party, who served as a member of the House of Representatives in the Diet (national legislature).

== Early life ==
Ochi is a native of Setagaya, Tokyo. He graduated from Keio University with a degree in economics in March 1986 and from École Supérieure des Sciences Économiques et Commerciales in France in June 1991. He also received a master's degree in the history of foreign affairs in Japanese politics from the University of Tokyo in March 2005.

== Political career ==
He was elected to the House of Representatives for the first time in September 2005 after running unsuccessfully in 2003. He is affiliated to the revisionist lobby Nippon Kaigi.

== Career ==
- Banker
- 5 times elected to the House of Representatives (constituency: Tokyo Proportional - Tokyo 6 )
- State Minister of Cabinet Office
- Parliamentary Vice-Minister of Cabinet Office
- Member, Committee on Cabinet, HR
- Areas of interest: fiscal and monetary policy, economic growth strategy, Foreign Affairs and national security

== Honours ==
- Netherlands: Grand Officer of the Order of Orange-Nassau (29 October 2014)
