= Tokyo 21st district =

Japan House of Representatives constituency

Tokyo 21st District
- Parliamentary constituency for the Japanese House of Representatives
- Numbered map of Tokyo single-member districts
- Prefecture: Tokyo
- Proportional District: Tokyo
- Electorate: 386,559

Current constituency
- Created: 1994
- Seats: One
- Party: LDP
- Representative: Kiyoshi Odawara
- Municipalities: The eastern part of Hachiōji, Tachikawa and Hino

Tokyo 21st district (東京都第21区, Tokyo-to dai-ni-juikku or simply 東京21区, Tokyo-ni-juikku) is a single-member constituency of the House of Representatives in the national Diet of Japan located in Tokyo.

The incumbent candidate, former Foreign Affairs Senior Vice Minister Kiyoshi Odawara, was not endorsed by the LDP because of involvement in the 2023–2024 Japanese slush fund scandal and ran as an independent candidate.

== List of representatives ==
Election	Representative	Party	Dates	Notes
1996	Jōji Yamamoto	DPJ	1996–1998	
1996	Jōji Yamamoto	DPJ	1998–2000	
2000	Jōji Yamamoto	DPJ	1998–2000	
2000	Etsuko Kawada	Indep.	2000–2003	
2003	Akihisa Nagashima	DPJ	2003–2005	
2005	Yuichi Ogawa	LDP	2005–2009	
2009	Akihisa Nagashima	DPJ	2009–2014	
2012	Akihisa Nagashima	DPJ	2009–2014	
2014	Kiyoshi Odawara	LDP	2014–2017	
2017	Akihisa Nagashima	Kibō	2017–2018	
2017	Akihisa Nagashima	Indep.	2018–2019	
2017	Akihisa Nagashima	LDP	2019–2021	
2021	Kiyoshi Odawara	LDP	2021–2024	
2024	Masako Ōkawara	CDP	2024–2026	
2026	Kiyoshi Odawara	LDP	2026–	

== Election results ==
2026
Party	Candidate	Votes	%	±%
LDP	Kiyoshi Odawara	97,494	42.6	▲10.4
Centrist Reform	Retsu Suzuki	65,713	28.7	▼13.4
DPP	Tarō Kuroda	37,086	16.2	
Sanseitō	Nami Hoshino	22,373	9.8	▲1.2
Genzei–Yukoku	Kazuhisa Yata	6,154	2.7	
Registered electors		406,978		
Turnout			57.86	▲2.00
LDP gain from Centrist Reform				

2024
Party	Candidate	Votes	%	±%
CDP	Masako Ōkawara (PR incumbent)	90,724	42.14	▲2.03
Independent	Kiyoshi Odawara	69,421	32.24	▼13.27
Ishin	Yōko Yamashita	36,642	17.02	▲2.64
Sanseitō	Yūichi Mori	18,511	8.60	
Turnout		215,298	55.86	▼1.86

2021
Party	Candidate	Votes	%	±%
LDP	Kiyoshi Odawara (incumbent-Tokyo-PR)	112,433	45.51	▲6.37
CDP	Masako Ōkawara (incumbent-Northern Kanto-PR) (elected by Tokyo-PR)	99,090	40.11	New
Ishin	Mitsuaki Takeda	35,527	14.38	New
Registered electors		438,466		
Turnout			57.72	▲3.54

2017
Party	Candidate	Votes	%	±%
Kibō	Akihisa Nagashima (incumbent-Tokyo-PR)	92,356	40.97	New
LDP	Kiyoshi Odawara (incumbent) (elected by Tokyo-PR)	88,225	39.14	▼2.45
SDP	Kensuke Koito	38,195	16.94	▲7.16
Indep.	Naoto Amaki	6,655	2.95	New
Registered electors		429,529		
Turnout			54.18	▼0.09

2014
Party	Candidate	Votes	%	±%
LDP	Kiyoshi Odawara (incumbent-Tokyo-PR)	83,984	41.59	▲10.75
DPJ	Akihisa Nagashima (incumbent) (elected by Tokyo-PR)	82,351	40.78	▲4.33
JCP	Masafumi Yoshioka	35,598	17.63	▲8.05
Registered electors		383,589		
Turnout			54.27	▼7.79

2012
Party	Candidate	Votes	%	±%
DPJ	Akihisa Nagashima (incumbent)	82,831	36.45	▼21.17
LDP	Kiyoshi Odawara (elected by Tokyo-PR)	70,070	30.84	▼1.37
JRP	Rie Sasaki	36,734	16.17	New
JCP	Masafumi Yoshioka	21,762	9.58	▲1.02
TP	Yūji Fujita	11,408	5.02	New
Indep.	Hiroyuki Tanikawa	4,413	1.94	New
Registered electors		381,396		
Turnout			62.06	▼4.56

2009
Party	Candidate	Votes	%	±%
DPJ	Akihisa Nagashima (incumbent-Tokyo-PR)	142,418	57.62	▲16.00
LDP	Yuichi Ogawa (incumbent)	79,628	32.21	▼13.86
JCP	Atsumaro Hoshi	21,155	8.56	▼2.18
HRP	Atsushi Yamamoto	3,976	1.61	New
Registered electors		377,839		
Turnout			66.62	▲0.50

2005
Party	Candidate	Votes	%	±%
LDP	Yuichi Ogawa	109,310	46.07	▲11.47
DPJ	Akihisa Nagashima (incumbent) (elected by Tokyo-PR)	98,749	41.62	▲2.43
JCP	Yutaka Tagawa	25,483	10.74	▲2.36
Indep.	Yutaka Sogō	3,739	1.58	New
Registered electors		366,405		
Turnout			66.12	▲6.95

2003
Party	Candidate	Votes	%	±%
DPJ	Akihisa Nagashima	81,398	39.19	▲20.65
LDP	Jōji Hashimoto	71,873	34.60	▼0.48
Indep.	Etsuko Kawada (incumbent)	37,019	17.82	▼18.78
JCP	Yutaka Tagawa	17,409	8.38	▼9.00
Registered electors		360,711		
Turnout			59.17	▼2.47

By-election, October 22, 2000
Party	Candidate	Votes	%	±%
Indep.	Etsuko Kawada	51,008	36.60	New
LDP	Sekikazu Kato	48,883	35.08	▼0.05
DPJ	Akihisa Nagashima	25,843	18.54	▼28.95
SDP	Teiko Kidō	13,627	9.78	New
Turnout				

2000
Party	Candidate	Votes	%	±%
DPJ	Jōji Yamamoto	98,775	47.49	▲18.58
LDP	Sekikazu Kato	73,067	35.13	▲9.42
JCP	Yasuo Sugita	36,150	17.38	▼3.53
Registered electors		348,869		
Turnout			61.65	

1996
Party	Candidate	Votes	%	±%
DPJ	Jōji Yamamoto	55,458	28.91	New
LDP	Kiyoshi Ozawa (elected by Tokyo-PR)	49,308	25.71	New
NFP	Toshiaki Koga	46,919	24.46	New
JCP	Emi Iwasa	40,114	20.91	New
Turnout				
