= Nobuto Hosaka =

Japanese politician

- 保坂 展人

Mayor of Setagaya
- Incumbent
- Assumed office 27 April 2011
- Preceded by: Noriyuki Kumamoto

Member of the House of Representatives
- In office 12 September 2005 – 21 July 2009
- Constituency: Tokyo PR
- In office 21 October 1996 – 10 October 2003
- Preceded by: Constituency established
- Succeeded by: Multi-member district
- Constituency: Tokyo PR

Personal details
- Born: 26 November 1955 (age 70) Sendai, Miyagi, Japan
- Party: Independent
- Other political affiliations: SDP (1996–2011)
- Website: hosaka.gr.jp

Nobuto Hosaka (保坂 展人, Hosaka Nobuto) (born 26 November 1955) is a Japanese politician and the current mayor of Setagaya in Tokyo. In addition, he was a member of the House of Representatives for the Social Democratic Party until 21 July 2009.

Hosaka campaigned and won the mayor's job on an anti-nuclear platform in April 2011, just over a month after the Fukushima Daiichi nuclear disaster. According to The Wall Street Journal, Hosaka "is determined to turn this city ward of 840,000 people, the largest in Tokyo, into the front-runner of a movement that will put an end to Japan's reliance on atomic power and accelerate the use of renewable energy".

Hosaka opposes the death penalty, and held the position of secretary general of the Parliamentary League for the Abolition of the Death Penalty. He is also highly critical of continued Japanese moral panic against the Otaku subculture in the nation, with one notable case of criticism displayed against public and media related assumptions and gossip surrounding the incidents of 17 November 2004, when Kaoru Kobayashi murdered a 7-year-old girl.

In 2006 and 2007, Hosaka joined the gay parade in Tokyo. Mizuho Fukushima, then-leader of the Social Democratic Party, also joined the event with him in 2007.

== See also ==
- Anti-nuclear power movement in Japan
- Capital punishment in Japan
- Shizuka Kamei
- List of peace activists
