= Tokyo proportional representation block =

Japanese House of Representatives constituency

Tokyo Proportional Representation Block
- Parliamentary constituency for the Japanese House of Representatives
- Map of House of Representatives proportional blocks, with the Tōkyō block highlighted
- Prefectures: Tokyo
- Electorate: 11,563,998 (2026)

Current constituency
- Created: 1994
- Number of members: 19

The Tōkyō proportional representation block (Japanese: 比例[代表]東京ブロック, Hepburn: Hirei [daihyō] Tōkyō burokku), or more formally the proportional representation tier "Tokyo Metropolis electoral district" (東京都選挙区, Tōkyō-to senkyo-ku), is one of eleven proportional representation (PR) "blocks", multi-member constituencies for the House of Representatives in the Diet of Japan. It consists solely of the prefecture of Tokyo making it one of two blocks covering only one prefecture, the other being Hokkaido. Following the introduction of proportional voting Tokyo elected 19 representatives by PR in the 1996 general election, and 17 since the election of 2000 when the total number of PR seats was reduced from 200 to 180.

== Results timeline ==
=== Vote share ===
Party	1996	2000	2003	2005	2009	2012	2014	2017	2021	2024	2026
LDP	26.97	19.49	32.51	40.24	25.47	24.87	32.06	30.47	31.02	23.63	33.10
NFP	24.59										
DPJ (Note: 1996 DP)	23.40	29.02	39.89	29.62	40.98	15.42	16.31				
JCP	17.81	14.34	9.27	8.85	9.61	7.41	15.37	10.37	10.40	7.86	6.01
SDP	5.41	6.62	4.30	4.54	4.32	2.09	2.26	0.95	1.44	1.52	1.24
LP		13.62									
Komeito		12.75	14.03	12.38	10.35	10.14	12.15	10.81	11.10	9.04	
Nippon				4.38	1.45						
Your					6.06	11.67					
PNP					1.24						
Ishin (Note: 2012 JRP, 2014 JIP)						19.86	14.16	3.32	13.32	8.15	5.67
TPJ						6.96					
PLP							2.71				
CDP								23.58	20.06	20.47	
KnT								17.44			
Reiwa									5.59	7.13	2.65
DPFP									4.75	14.91	11.02
Sanseitō										3.74	6.30
CPJ										3.18	3.09
CRA											16.51
Mirai											13.10
Others	1.81 (Note: NSP 1.32, LL 0.50)	4.16 (Note: Socialist 1.75, Assembly of Independents 1.20, LL 0.70, NCP 0.51)			0.51 (Note: HRP 0.51)	1.68 (Note: NRP 1.43, HRP 0.25)	4.99 (Note: Generations 4.39, HRP 0.31, NRP 0.29)	3.04 (Note: No Party Support 2.10, Kokoro 0.68, HRP 0.27)	2.32 (Note: NHK 1.43, Japan First 0.52, New Party Yamato 0.26, Corona 0.10)	0.38 (Note: The Collaborative Party 0.38)	1.32 (Note: Genyu 1.32)
Turnout		60.39	58.27	65.51	66.35	62.20	54.36	53.63	57.20	56.06	59.15

=== Seat distribution ===
Election	Distribution	Seats
1996		19
2000		17
2003		17
2005		17
2009		17
2012		17
2014		17
2017		17
2021		17
2024		19
2026		19

== List of representatives ==
D'Hondt allocation order	1996	2000	2003	2005	2009	2012	2014	2017	2021
1	Takashi Fukaya	Tetsundo Iwakuni	Yukihiko Akutsu	Kuniko Inoguchi	Kumiko Hayakawa	Kiyoshi Odawara	Tsukasa Akimoto	Takao Ochi	Kei Takagi
2	Masamitsu Jōjima	Midori Matsushima	Eita Yashiro	Yoshinori Suematsu	Ichiro Kamoshita	Shintarō Ishihara	Akihisa Nakajima	Yoshio Tezuka	Shunsuke Ito
3	Eiko Ishige	Masamitsu Jōjima	Yukihisa Fujita	Yamatada Tsuchiya	Mitsuaki Takeda	Banri Kaieda	Fumiaki Matsumoto	Jin Matsubara	Yohei Matsumoto
4	Tetsuzo Fuwa	Tetsuzo Fuwa	Kunio Hatoyama	Kōichi Katō	Eiko Ichige	Tsukasa Akimoto	Akira Kasai	Miki Yamada	Tsukasa Abe
5	Hyosuke Kujiraoka	Shōzō Azuma	Yosuke Tagaki	Kazuo Aichi	Masaaki Taira	Toshiaki Ōkuma	Takayuki Ochiai	Yoshinori Suematsu	Yōsuke Takagi
6	Shōzō Azuma	Akihiro Ōta	Kazuo Inoue	Yōsuke Takagi	Yōsuke Takagi	Yōsuke Takagi	Yōsuke Takagi	Yōsuke Takagi	Akira Kasai
7	Sadao Yamahana died 1999, replaced by Osamu Shibutani	Kunio Hatoyama	Tatsuya Itō	Jun'ichirō Yasui	Kōki Kobayashi	Hirofumi Imamura	Hayato Suzuki	Akira Kasai	Takao Ochi
8	Ichirō Takahashi	Muneaki Samejima	Muneaki Samejima	Yōko Komiyama	Akira Kasai	Fumiaki Matsumoto	Jin Matsubara	Kiyoshi Odawara	Yosuke Suzuki
9	Mutsumi Sasaki	Kazuo Inoue	Tomio Yamaguchi	Akira Kasai	Kaoru Yosano	Jin Matsubara	Megumi Maekawa	Mito Kakizawa	Kenji Wakamiya
10	Otohiko Endō	Tomio Yamaguchi	Kaoru Yosano	Kenji Wakamiya	Kōichi Yoshida	Akira Kasai	Tōru Miyamoto	Akihiro Hatsushika	Banri Kaieda
11	Banri Kaieda	Yoshio Suzuki	Hisashi Shimada	Akihisa Nagashima	Tomotarō Kawashima	Ai Aoki	Akihiro Hatsushika	Fumiaki Matsumoto	Taisuke Ono
12	Kiyoshi Ozawa	Nobuto Hosaka	Michiyo Takagi	Taku Ōtsuka	Yuriko Koike	Hiroshi Yamada	Masaru Wakasa resigned 2016, replaced by Tsuyoshi Tabata	Takao Ando	Akihisa Nagashima
13	Akihiro Ōta	Tatsuya Itō	Hirosato Nakatsugawa	Michiyo Takagi	Mito Kakizawa	Tsuneo Akaeda	Michiyo Takaki	Ikuo Yamahana	Taro Yamamoto resigned, replaced by Mari Kushibuchi
14	Taketoshi Nakajima	Yōsuke Takagi	Ichirō Kamoshita	Akira Nagatsuma	Hirosato Nakatsugawa	Hidehiro Mitani	Naoto Kan	Shunsuke Ito	Koichi Kasai
15	Yukihisa Fujita	Eiko Ishige	Eiko Ishige	Seiichiro Shimizu	Michiyo Takagi	Naoto Kan	Tsuneo Akaeda	Michiyo Takagi	Toru Miyamoto
16	Nobuto Hosaka	Ichirō Takahashi	Takashi Kosugi	Jin Matsubara	Kōichirō Watanabe	Michiyo Takagi	Saori Ikeuchi	Toru Miyamoto	Hirotaka Ishihara
17	Michio Ochi	Hirosato Nakatsugawa	Noboru Usami	Nobuto Hosaka	Isshū Sugawara	Tsuyoshi Tabata	Takatane Kiuchi	Kei Tagaki	Masako Ōkawara
18	Keiichi Ishii								
19	Kōki Ishii								

== Election results ==
=== 2026 ===
2026 results in the Tokyo PR block
Party	Votes	Swing	%	Seats	+/–
Liberal Democratic Party (LDP)	2,243,625	33.10	▲9.47	3 (Note: Five of eight seats forfeited due to lack of candidates)	▼2
Centrist Reform Alliance (CRA) (Note: Swings compared to CDP and Komeito)	1,119,155	16.51	▼13.00	5	▼2
Team Mirai	887,849	13.10	New	4	New
Democratic Party For the People (DPFP)	746,660	11.02	▼3.89	3	0
Sanseitō	427,028	6.30	▲2.56	2	▲2
Japanese Communist Party (JCP)	407,146	6.01	▼1.85	1	0
Japan Innovation Party (Ishin)	384,487	5.67	▼2.48	1	▼1
Conservative Party of Japan (CPJ)	209,329	3.09	▼0.09	0	0
Reiwa Shinsengumi (Reiwa)	179,614	2.65	▼4.48	0	▼1
Tax Cuts Japan and Yukoku Alliance (Genyu)	89,161	1.32	New	0	New
Social Democratic Party (SDP)	84,362	1.24	▼0.28	0	0
Total	6,778,416	100.00		19	
Invalid votes	61,808	0.90			
Turnout	6,840,224	59.15	▲3.09		
Registered voters	11,563,998				

=== 2024 ===
2024 results in the Tokyo PR block
Party	Votes	Swing	%	Seats	+/–
Liberal Democratic Party (LDP)	1,498,632	23.63	▼7.39	5	▼1
Constitutional Democratic Party of Japan (CDP)	1,298,166	20.47	▲0.41	5	▲1
Democratic Party For the People (DPFP)	945,460	14.91	▲10.16	3	▲3
Komeito	573,191	9.04	▼2.06	2	0
Japan Innovation Party (Ishin)	516,610	8.15	▼5.18	2	0
Japanese Communist Party (JCP)	498,565	7.86	▼2.54	1	▼1
Reiwa Shinsengumi (Reiwa)	451,865	7.13	▲1.54	1	0
Sanseitō	237,271	3.74	New	0	New
Conservative Party of Japan (CPJ)	201,770	3.18	New	0	New
Social Democratic Party (SDP)	96,302	1.52	▲0.08	0	0
The Collaborative Party	23,784	0.38	▼1.06	0	0
Total	6,341,616	100.00		19	▲2
Invalid votes	123,185	1.91			
Turnout	6,464,801	56.06	▼1.15		
Registered voters	11,532,823				

=== 2021 ===
2021 results in the Tokyo PR block
Party	Votes	Swing	%	Seats	+/–
Liberal Democratic Party (LDP)	2,000,084	31.02	▲0.55	6	0
Constitutional Democratic Party of Japan (CDP)	1,293,281	20.06	▼3.52	4	0
Japan Innovation Party (Ishin)	858,877	13.32	▲10.00	2	▲2
Komeito	715,450	11.10	▲0.28	2	0
Japanese Communist Party (JCP)	670,340	10.40	▲0.02	2	0
Reiwa Shinsengumi (Reiwa)	360,387	5.59	New	1	New
Democratic Party For the People (DPFP)	306,180	4.75	New	0	New
Social Democratic Party (SDP)	92,995	1.44	▲0.49	0	0
NHK Party	92,353	1.43	New	0	New
Japan First Party	33,661	0.52	New	0	New
New Party Yamato	16,970	0.26	New	0	New
Corona Countermeasures	6,620	0.10	New	0	New
Total	6,447,198	100.00		17	
Invalid votes	123,532	1.88			
Turnout	6,570,730	57.20	▲3.57		
Registered voters	11,486,835				

=== 2017 ===
2017 results in the Tokyo PR block
Party	Votes	Swing	%	Seats	+/–
Liberal Democratic Party (LDP)	1,816,184	30.47	▼1.60	6	0
Constitutional Democratic Party of Japan (CDP)	1,405,836	23.58	New	4	New
Kibō no Tō	1,039,647	17.44	New	3	New
Komeito	644,634	10.81	▼1.33	2	0
Japanese Communist Party (JCP)	618,332	10.37	▼5.00	2	▼1
Japan Innovation Party (Ishin)	198,127	3.32	New	0	New
No Party Support	125,019	2.10	New	0	New
Social Democratic Party (SDP)	56,732	0.95	▼1.30	0	0
Party for Japanese Kokoro	40,592	0.68	▼3.71	0	0
Happiness Realization Party (HRP)	15,872	0.27	▼0.04	0	0
Total	5,960,975	100.00		17	
Invalid votes	86,808	1.44			
Turnout	6,047,783	53.63	▼0.72		
Registered voters	11,276,090				

=== 2014 ===
2014 results in the Tokyo PR block
Party	Votes	Swing	%	Seats	+/–
Liberal Democratic Party (LDP)	1,847,986	32.06	▲7.19	6	▲1
Democratic Party of Japan (DPJ)	939,795	16.31	▲0.89	3	0
Japanese Communist Party (JCP)	885,927	15.37	▲7.96	3	▲2
Japan Innovation Party (JIP)	816,047	14.16	▼5.70	3	0
Komeito	700,127	12.15	▲2.01	2	0
Party for Future Generations	253,107	4.39	New	0	New
People's Life Party (PLP)	156,170	2.71	New	0	New
Social Democratic Party (SDP)	129,992	2.26	▲0.16	0	0
Happiness Realization Party (HRP)	17,648	0.31	▲0.05	0	0
Total	5,763,396	100.00		17	
Invalid votes	134,483	2.28			
Turnout	5,897,879	54.36	▼7.85		
Registered voters	10,850,600				

=== 2012 ===
2012 results in the Tokyo PR block
Party	Votes	Swing	%	Seats	+/–
Liberal Democratic Party (LDP)	1,626,057	24.87	▼0.60	5	0
Japan Restoration Party (JRP)	1,298,309	19.86	New	3	New
Democratic Party of Japan (DPJ)	1,008,011	15.42	▼25.56	3	▼5
Your Party	762,730	11.67	▲5.61	2	▲1
Komeito	662,743	10.14	▼0.22	2	0
Japanese Communist Party (JCP)	484,365	7.41	▼2.20	1	0
Tomorrow Party of Japan (TPJ)	448,689	6.86	New	1	New
Social Democratic Party (SDP)	136,889	2.09	▼2.22	0	0
New Renaissance Party (NRP)	93,194	1.43	New	0	New
Happiness Realization Party (HRP)	16,620	0.25	▼0.26	0	0
Total	6,537,607	100.00		17	
Invalid votes	131,025	1.96			
Turnout	6,668,632	62.20	▼4.15		
Registered voters	10,720,874				

=== 2009 ===
2009 results in the Tokyo PR block
Party	Votes	Swing	%	Seats	+/–
Democratic Party of Japan (DPJ)	2,839,081	40.98	▲11.36	8	▲2
Liberal Democratic Party (LDP)	1,764,696	25.47	▼14.76	5	▼2
Komeito	717,199	10.35	▼2.03	2	0
Japanese Communist Party (JCP)	665,462	9.61	▲0.76	1	0
Your Party	419,903	6.06	New	1	New
Social Democratic Party (SDP)	299,032	4.32	▼0.22	0	▼1
New Party Nippon (Nippon)	100,381	1.45	▼2.93	0	0
People's New Party (PNP)	86,046	1.24	New	0	New
Happiness Realization Party (HRP)	35,667	0.51	New	0	New
Total	6,927,467	100.00		17	
Invalid votes	106,620	1.52			
Turnout	7,034,087	66.35	▲0.84		
Registered voters	10,601,391				

=== 2005 ===
2005 results in the Tokyo PR block
Party	Votes	Swing	%	Seats	+/–
Liberal Democratic Party (LDP)	2,665,417	40.24	▲7.72	7	▲1
Democratic Party of Japan (DPJ)	1,962,225	29.62	▼10.27	6	▼2
Komeito	820,126	12.38	▼1.65	2	0
Japanese Communist Party (JCP)	586,017	8.85	▲1.56	1	0
Social Democratic Party (SDP)	300,782	4.54	▲0.24	1	▲1
New Party Nippon (Nippon)	290,027	4.38	New	0	New
Total	6,624,594	100.00		17	
Invalid votes	97,439	1.45			
Turnout	6,722,033	65.51	▲7.24		
Registered voters	10,260,943				

=== 2003 ===
2003 results in the Tokyo PR block
Party	Votes	Swing	%	Seats	+/–
Democratic Party of Japan (DPJ)	2,291,124	39.89	▲10.87	8	▲2
Liberal Democratic Party (LDP)	1,867,544	32.51	▲13.03	6	▲2
Komeito	805,640	14.03	▲1.28	2	0
Japanese Communist Party (JCP)	532,376	7.29	▼7.05	1	▼1
Social Democratic Party (SDP)	247,103	4.30	▼2.32	0	▼1
Total	5,743,787	100.00		17	
Invalid votes	135,900	2.31			
Turnout	5,879,687	58.27	▼2.12		
Registered voters	10,090,583				

=== 2000 ===
2000 results in the Tokyo PR block
Party	Votes	Swing	%	Seats	+/–
Democratic Party of Japan (DPJ)	1,653,045	29.02	▲5.62	6	▲1
Liberal Democratic Party (LDP)	1,110,177	19.49	▼7.48	4	▼1
Japanese Communist Party (JCP)	817,045	14.34	▼3.47	2	▼1
Liberal Party (LP)	776,018	13.62	New	2	New
Komeito	726,203	12.75	New	2	New
Social Democratic Party (SDP)	377,230	6.62	▲1.22	1	0
Socialist Party	99,565	1.76	New	0	New
Assembly of Independents	68,367	1.20	New	0	New
Liberal League (LL)	39,755	0.70	▲0.20	0	0
New Conservative Party (NCP)	29,232	0.51	New	0	New
Total	5,696,637	100.00		17	▼2
Invalid votes	198,668	3.37			
Turnout	5,895,305	60.39			
Registered voters	9,761,690				

=== 1996 ===
1996 results in the Tokyo PR block
Party	Votes	%	Seats
Liberal Democratic Party (LDP)	1,398,791	26.97	5
New Frontier Party (NFP)	1,275,432	24.59	5
Democratic Party (DP)	1,213,677	23.40	5
Japanese Communist Party (JCP)	923,764	17.81	3
Social Democratic Party (SDP)	280,391	5.41	1
New Socialist Party (NSP)	68,260	1.32	0
Liberal League (LL)	25,813	0.50	0
Total	5,186,128	100.00	19
