= 2021 Japanese general election in Tokyo =

- October 31, 2021

All 42 seats to the House of Representatives
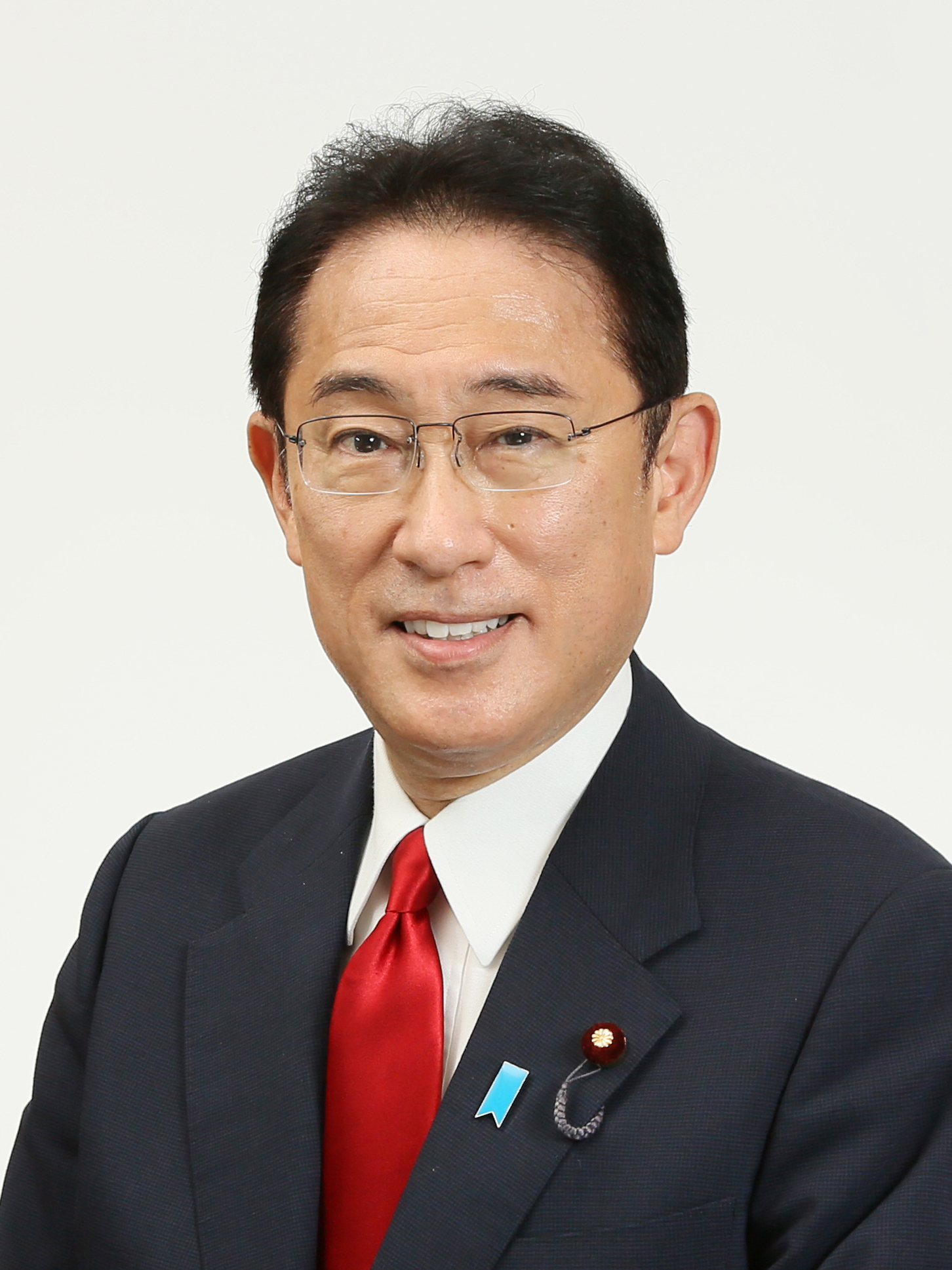

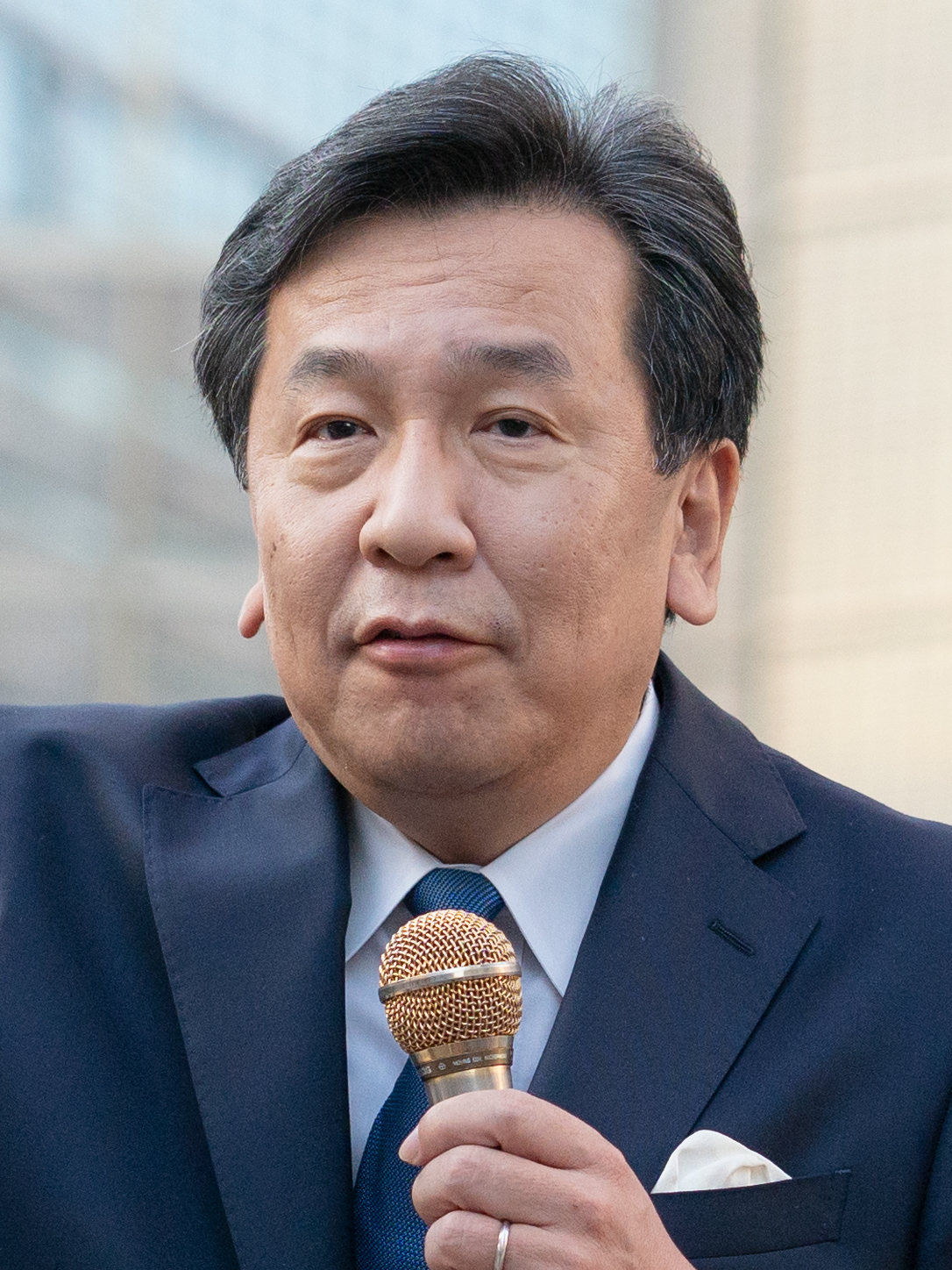

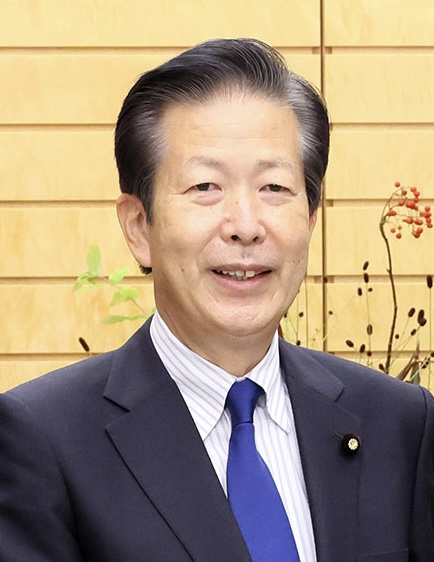

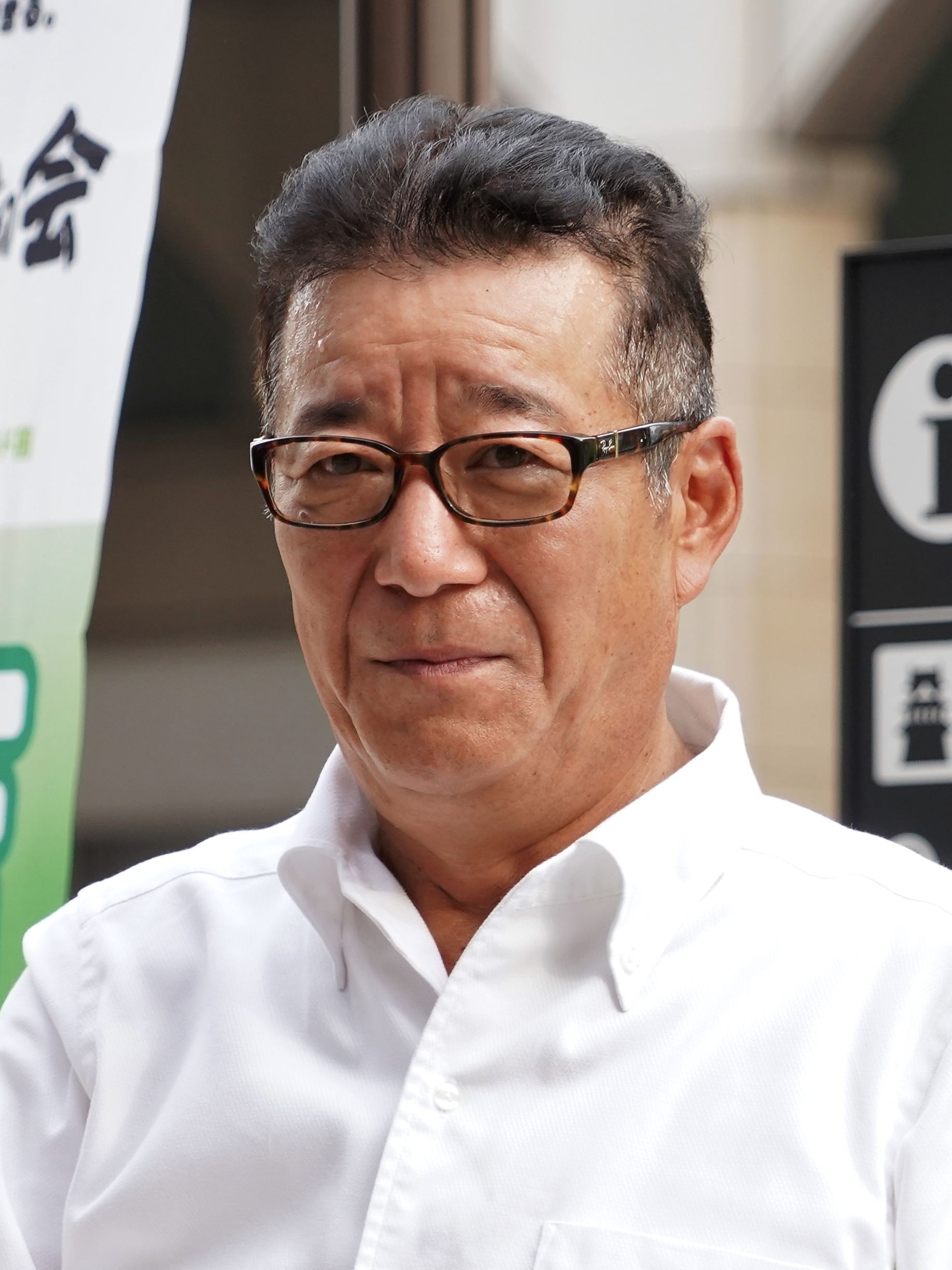

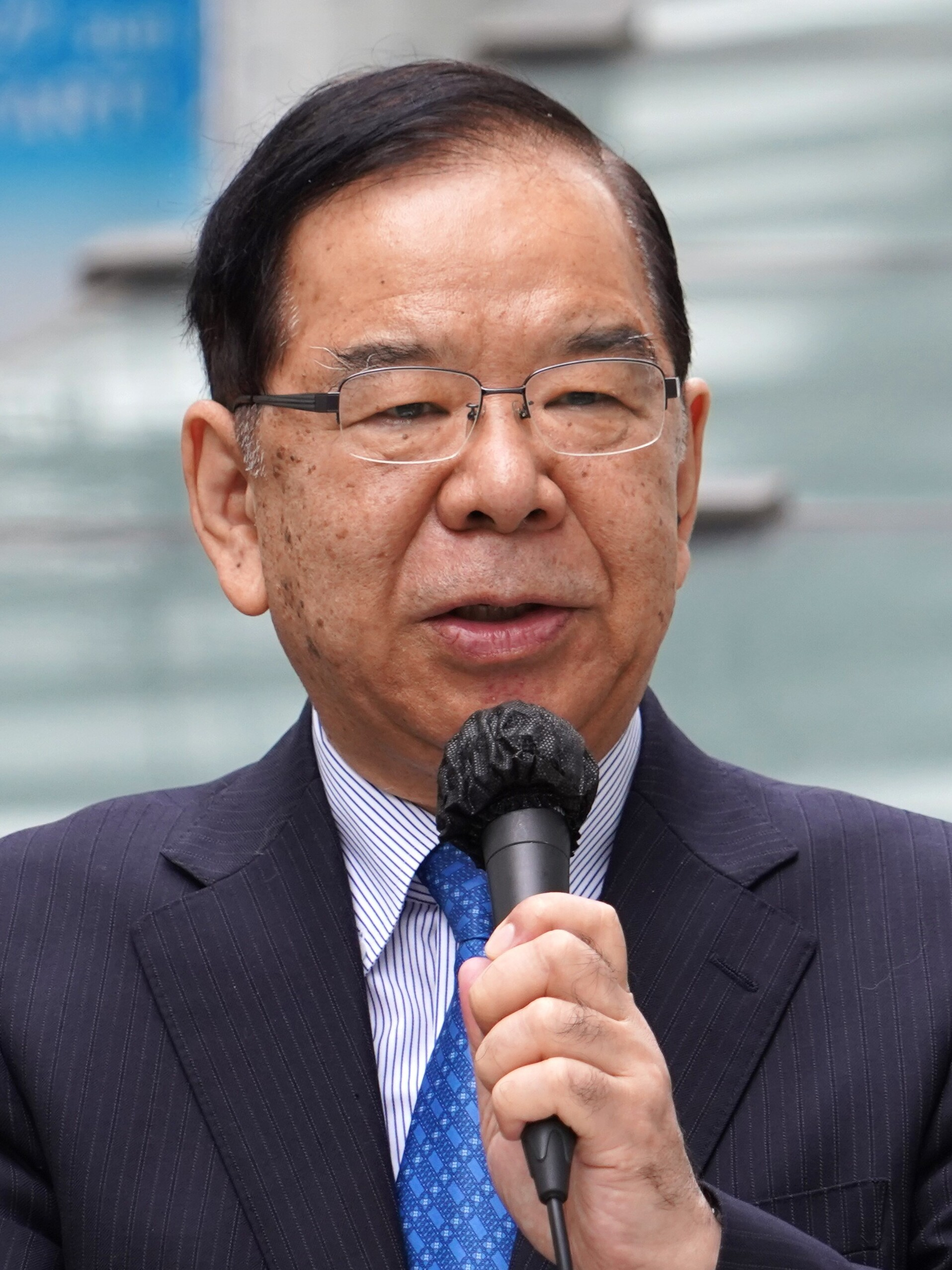

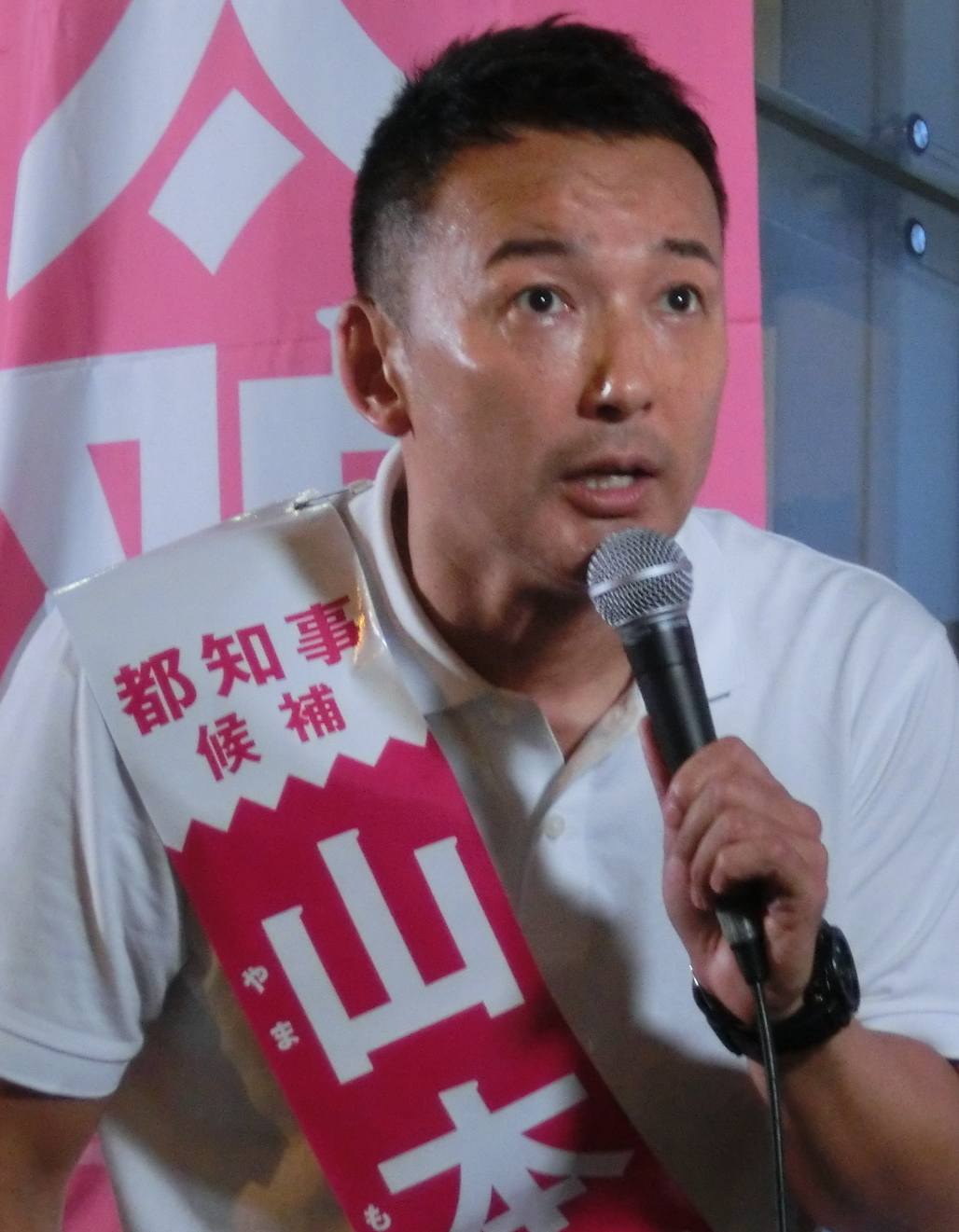
	Majority party	Minority party	Third party
Party	LDP	CDP	Komeito
Last election	26 seats	-	3 seats
Constituency	15	8	1
PR seats	6	4	2
Total	21	12	3
Seat change	▼5	New	Steady
	Fourth party	Fifth party	Sixth party
Party	Ishin	JCP	Reiwa
Last election	0 seats	2 seats	-
Constituency	0	0	0
PR seats	2	2	1
Total	2	2	1
Seat change	▲2	Steady	New
	Seventh party
Party	Independent
Last election	0 seats
Constituency	1
PR seats	-
Total	1
Seat change	▲1

The 2021 Japanese general election in Tokyo were held on October 31, 2021, to elect the 42 representatives, one from each of 25 Electoral districts and 17 proportional seats.

== Tokyo 1st district ==
2021 Tokyo 1st district election
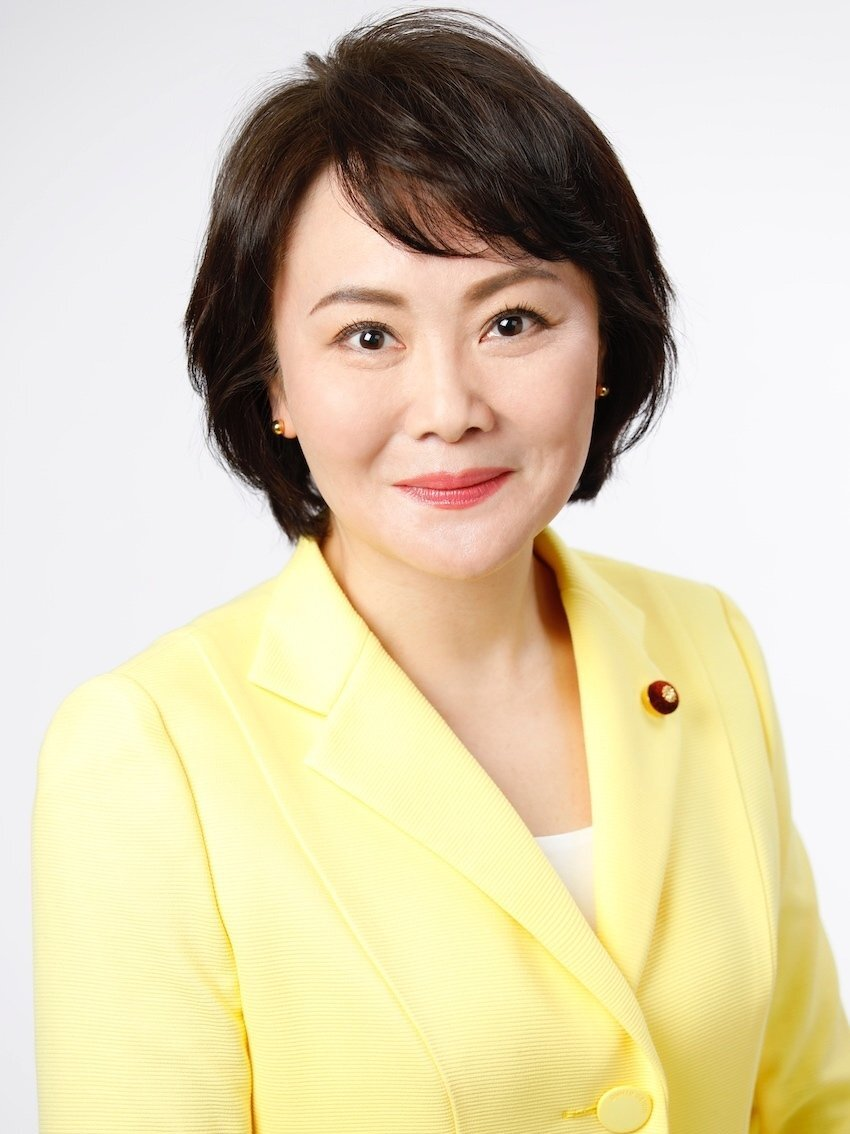

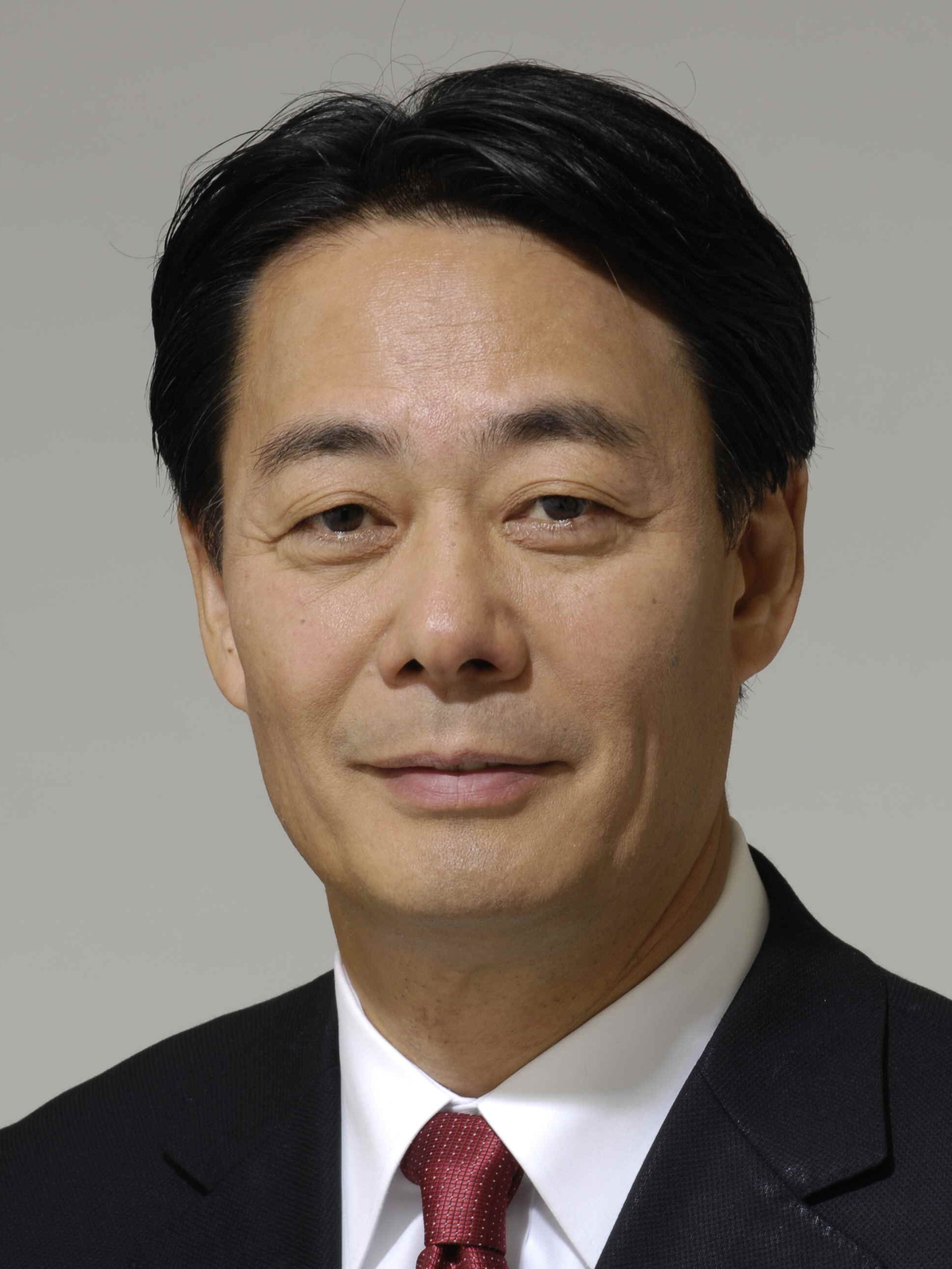

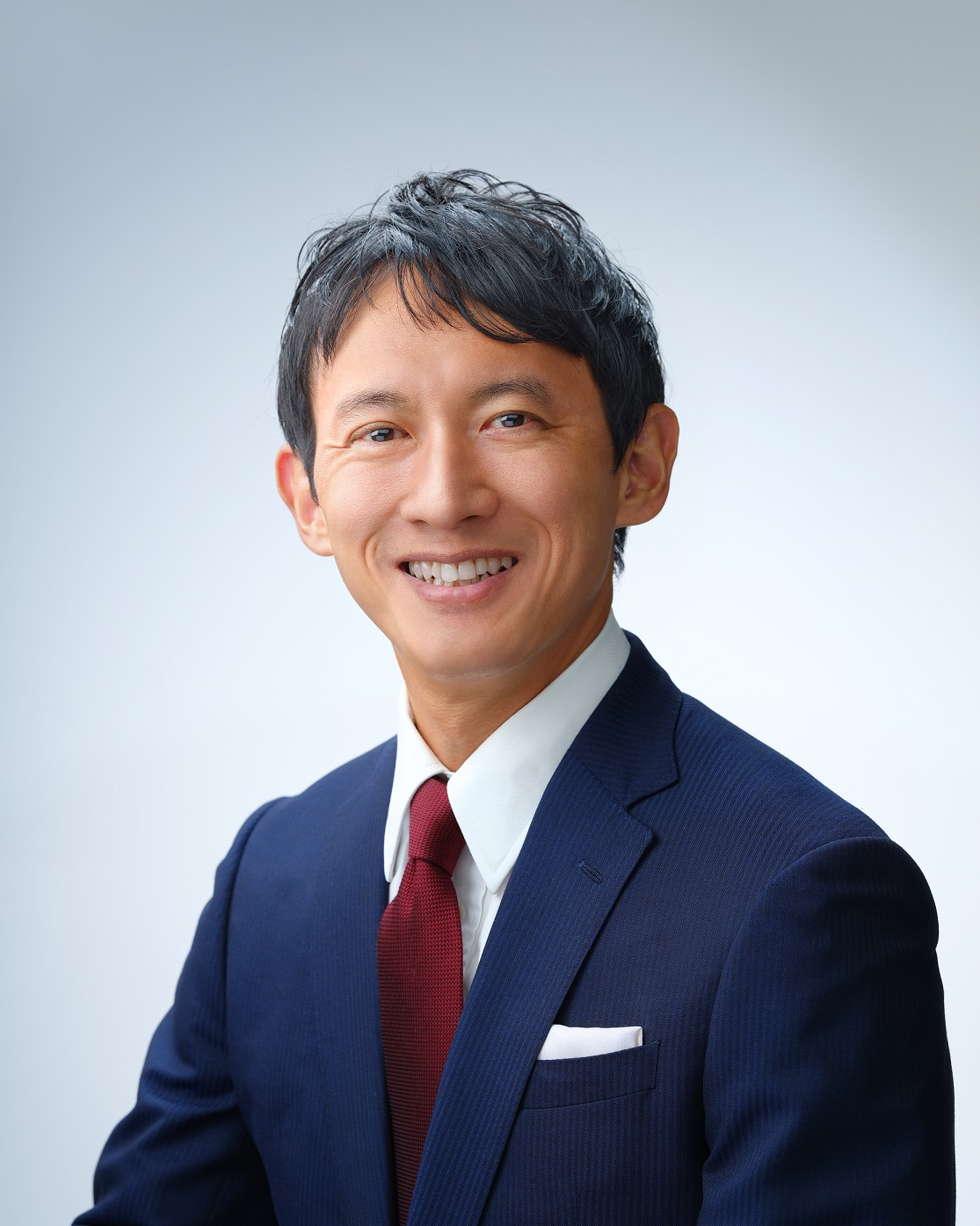
Nominee	Miki Yamada	Banri Kaieda	Taisuke Ono
Party	LDP	CDP	Ishin
Popular vote	99,133	90,043	60,230
Percentage	39.01%	35.43%	23.70%
Japanese Representative before election
Banri Kaieda
CDP
Elected Japanese Representative
Miki Yamada
LDP

Incumbent				Elected Member	
Member	Party	First elected	Status	Member	Party
Banri Kaieda	CDP	1993	Incumbent defeated. (Won PR seat.)	Miki Yamada	LDP

== Tokyo 2nd district ==
2021 Tokyo 2nd district election
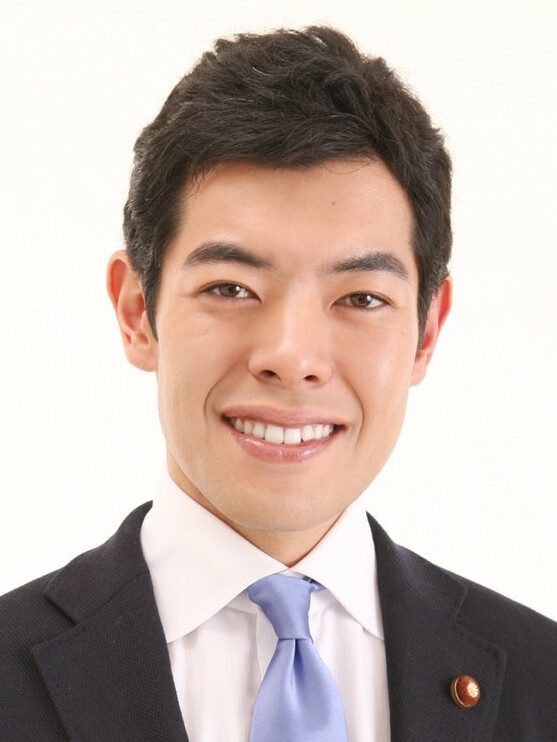

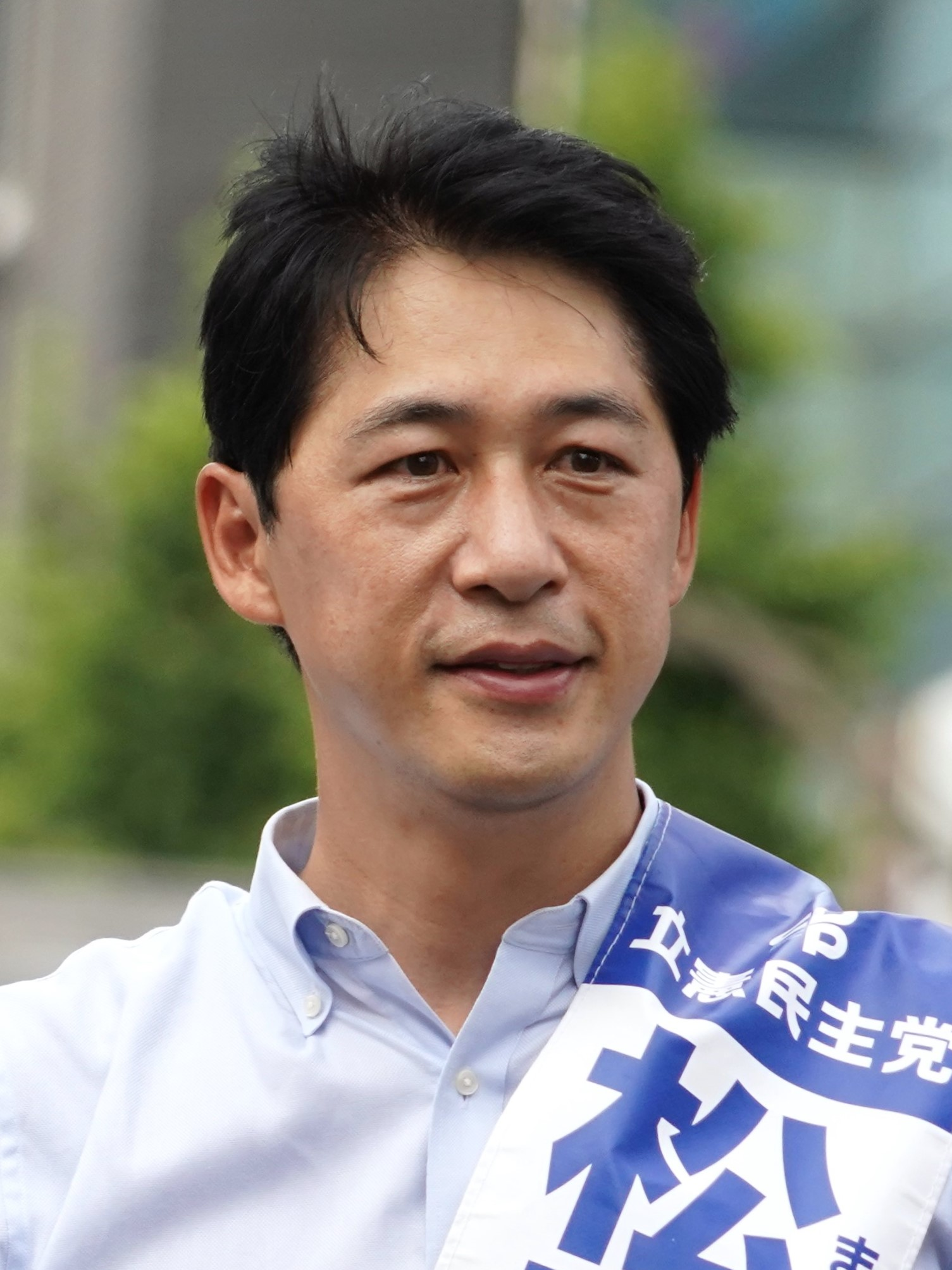
Nominee	Kiyoto Tsuji	Akihiro Matsuo	Takakane Kiuchi
Party	LDP	CDP	Ishin
Popular vote	119,281	90,422	45,754
Percentage	43.44%	32.93%	16.66%
Nominee	Itaru Kitamura
Party	Reiwa
Popular vote	14,487
Percentage	5.28%
Japanese Representative before election
Kiyoto Tsuji
LDP
Elected Japanese Representative
Kiyoto Tsuji
LDP

Incumbent				Elected Member	
Member	Party	First elected	Status	Member	Party
Kiyoto Tsuji	LDP	2012	Incumbent reelected.	Kiyoto Tsuji	LDP

== Tokyo 3rd district ==
2021 Tokyo 3rd district election
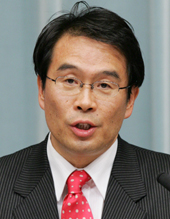

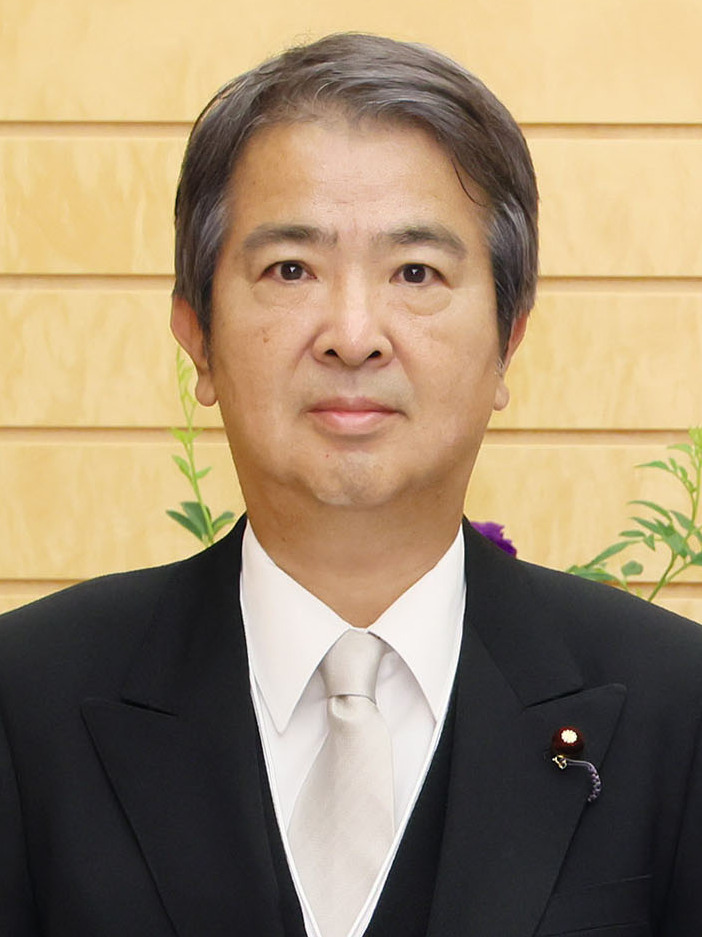
Nominee	Jin Matsubara	Hirotaka Ishihara	Katsusuke Kōzai
Party	CDP	LDP	JCP
Popular vote	124,961	116,753	30,648
Percentage	45.88%	42.87%	11.25%
Japanese Representative before election
Hirotaka Ishihara
LDP
Elected Japanese Representative
Jin Matsubara
CDP

Incumbent				Elected Member	
Member	Party	First elected	Status	Member	Party
Hirotaka Ishihara	LDP	2005	Incumbent defeated. (Won PR seat.)	Jin Matsubara	CDP

== Tokyo 4th district ==
2021 Tokyo 4th district election
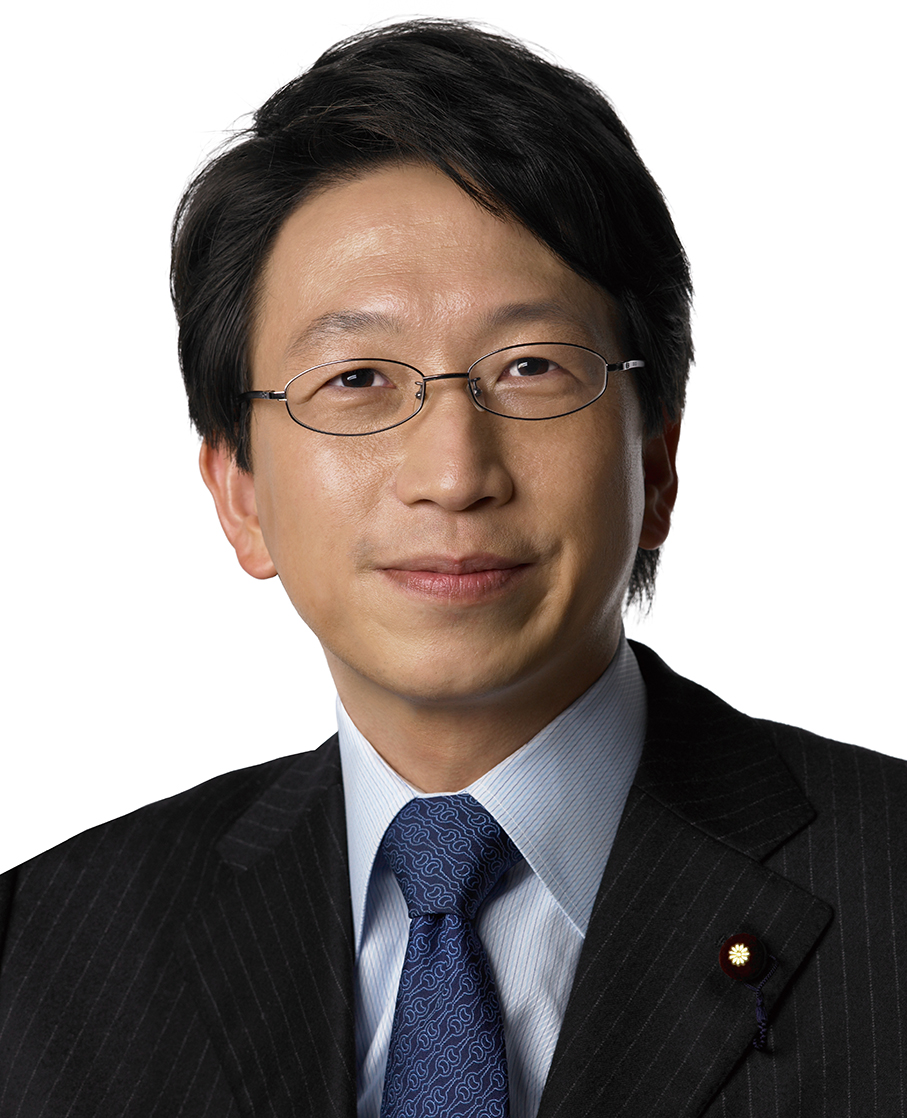
Nominee	Masaaki Taira	Tomoyuki Tanigawa	Tomooki Hayashi
Party	LDP	JCP	Ishin
Popular vote	128,708	62,286	58,891
Percentage	51.51%	24.93%	23.57%
Japanese Representative before election
Masaaki Taira
LDP
Elected Japanese Representative
Masaaki Taira
LDP

Incumbent				Elected Member	
Member	Party	First elected	Status	Member	Party
Masaaki Taira	LDP	2005	Incumbent reelected.	Masaaki Taira	LDP

== Tokyo 5th district ==
2021 Tokyo 5th district election
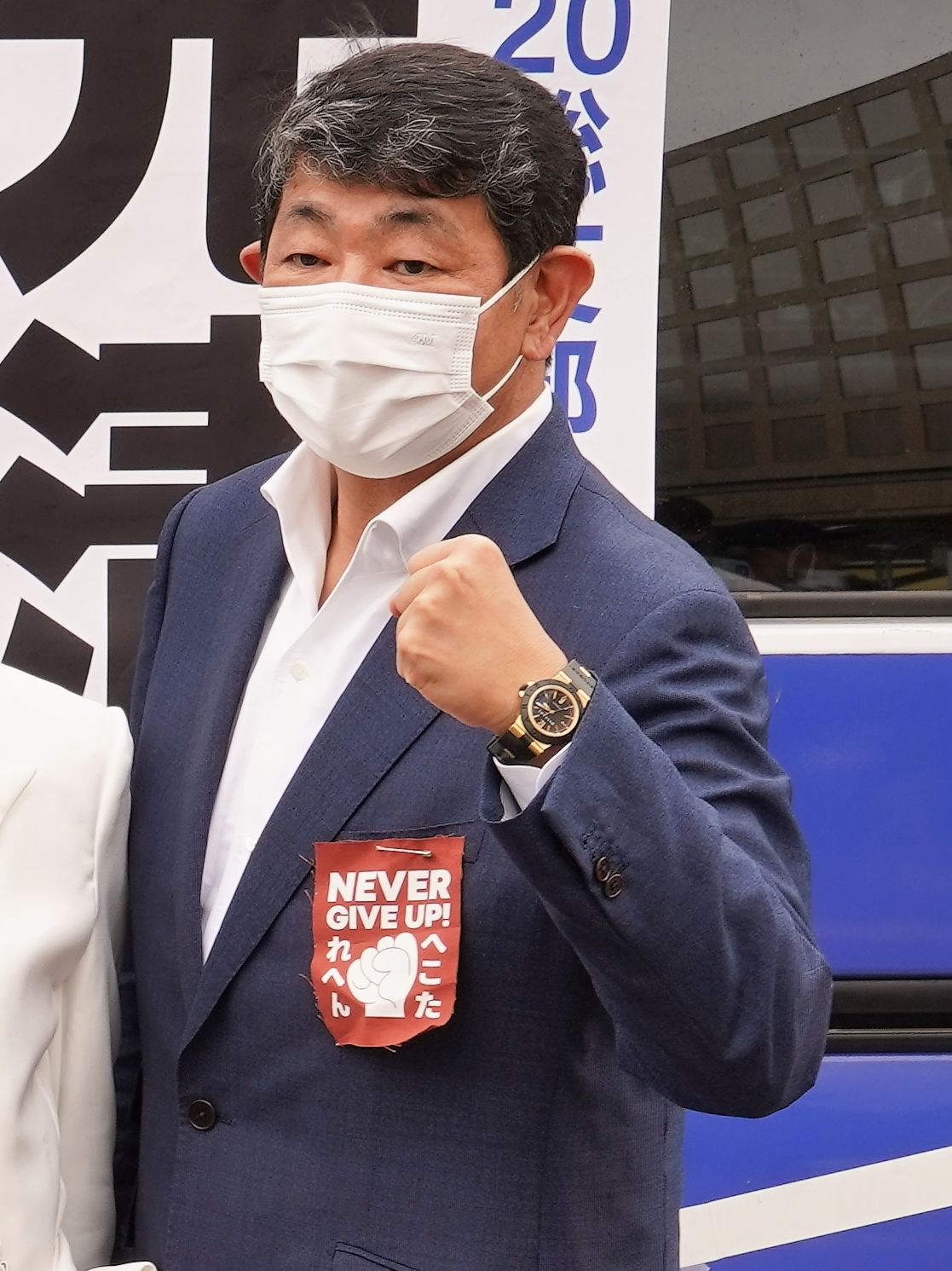

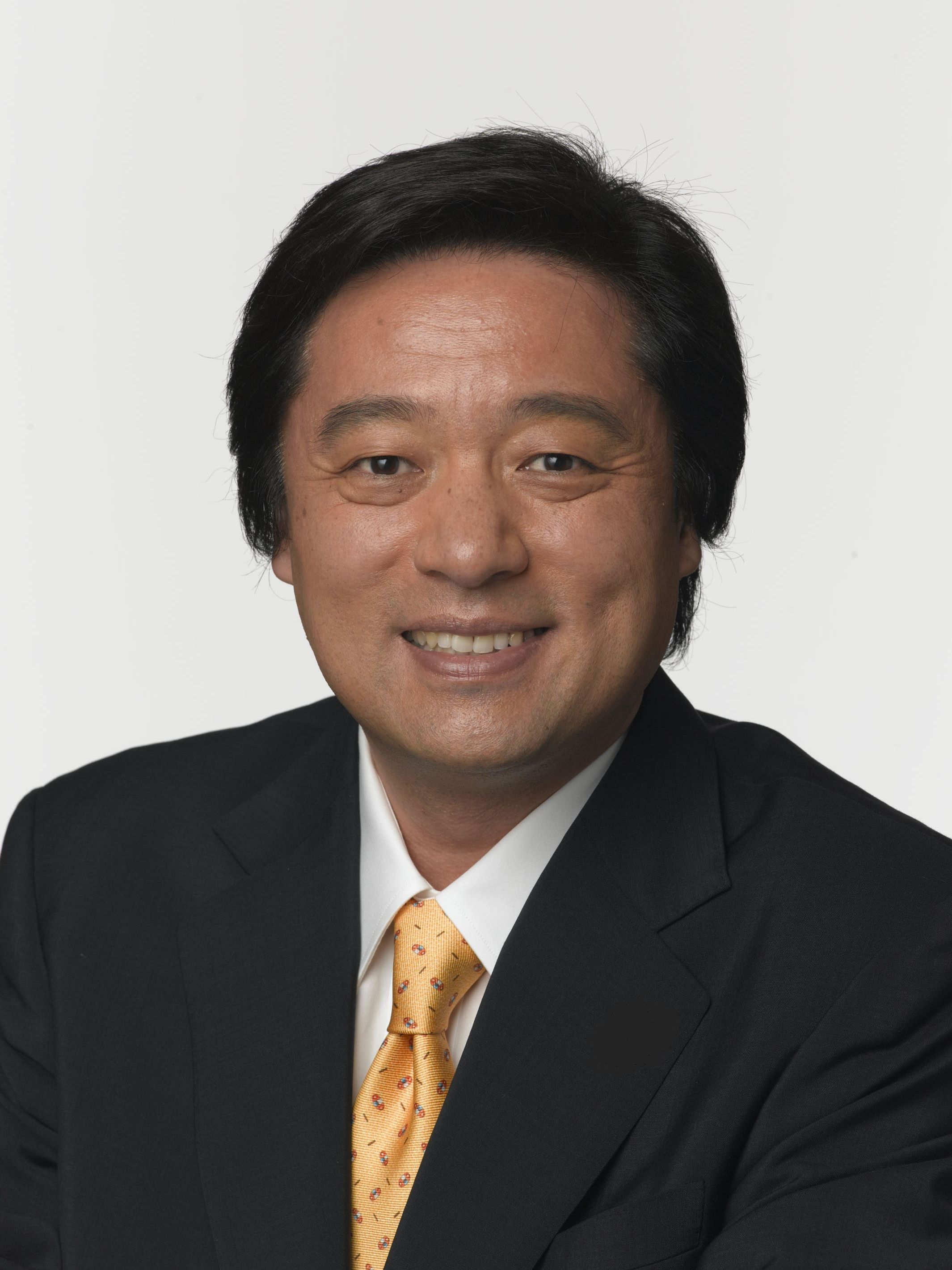
Nominee	Yoshio Tezuka	Kenji Wakamiya	Masafumi Tabuchi
Party	CDP	LDP	Ishin
Popular vote	111,246	105,842	45,754
Percentage	40.98%	38.99%	20.03%
Japanese Representative before election
Kenji Wakamiya
LDP
Elected Japanese Representative
Yoshio Tezuka
CDP

Incumbent				Elected Member	
Member	Party	First elected	Status	Member	Party
Kenji Wakamiya	LDP	2005	Incumbent defeated. (Won PR seat.)	Yoshio Tezuka	CDP

== Tokyo 6th district ==
2021 Tokyo 6th district election
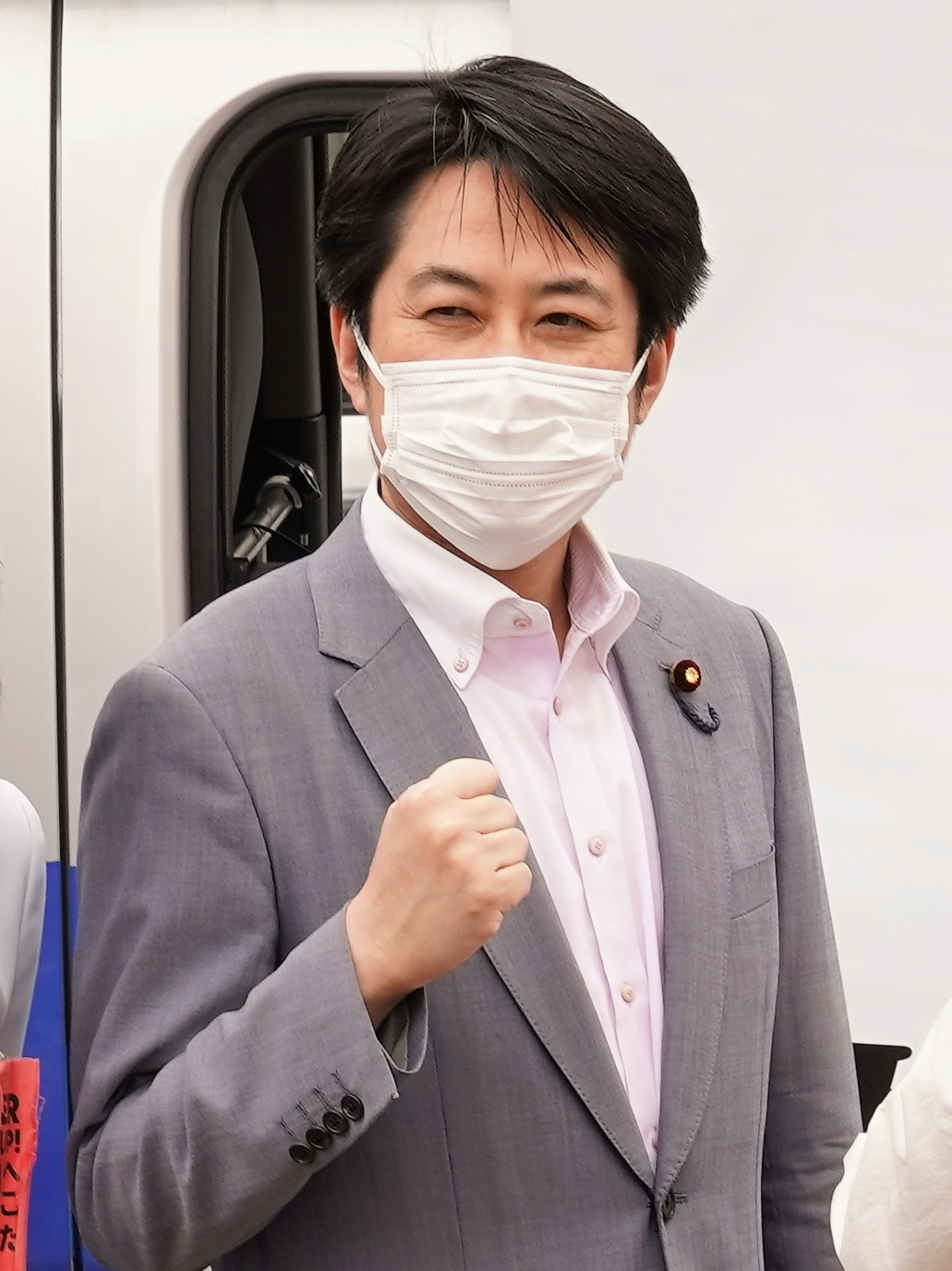

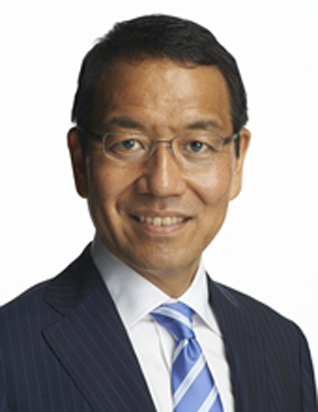
Nominee	Takayuki Ochiai	Takao Ochi	Rie Usui
Party	CDP	LDP	Ishin
Popular vote	110,169	105,186	59,490
Percentage	40.08%	38.27%	21.64%
Japanese Representative before election
Takayuki Ochiai
CDP
Elected Japanese Representative
Takayuki Ochiai
CDP

Incumbent				Elected Member	
Member	Party	First elected	Status	Member	Party
Takayuki Ochiai	CDP	2014	Incumbent reelected.	Takayuki Ochiai	CDP

== Tokyo 7th district ==
2021 Tokyo 7th district election
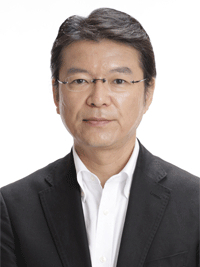

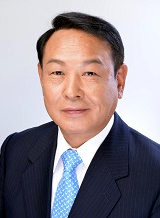
Nominee	Akira Nagatsuma	Fumiaki Matsumoto	Kentaro Tsuji
Party	CDP	LDP	Ishin
Popular vote	124,541	81,087	37,781
Percentage	49.25%	32.06%	14.94%
Japanese Representative before election
Akira Nagatsuma
CDP
Elected Japanese Representative
Akira Nagatsuma
CDP

Incumbent				Elected Member	
Member	Party	First elected	Status	Member	Party
Akira Nagatsuma	CDP	2000	Incumbent reelected.	Akira Nagatsuma	CDP

== Tokyo 8th district ==
2021 Tokyo 8th district election
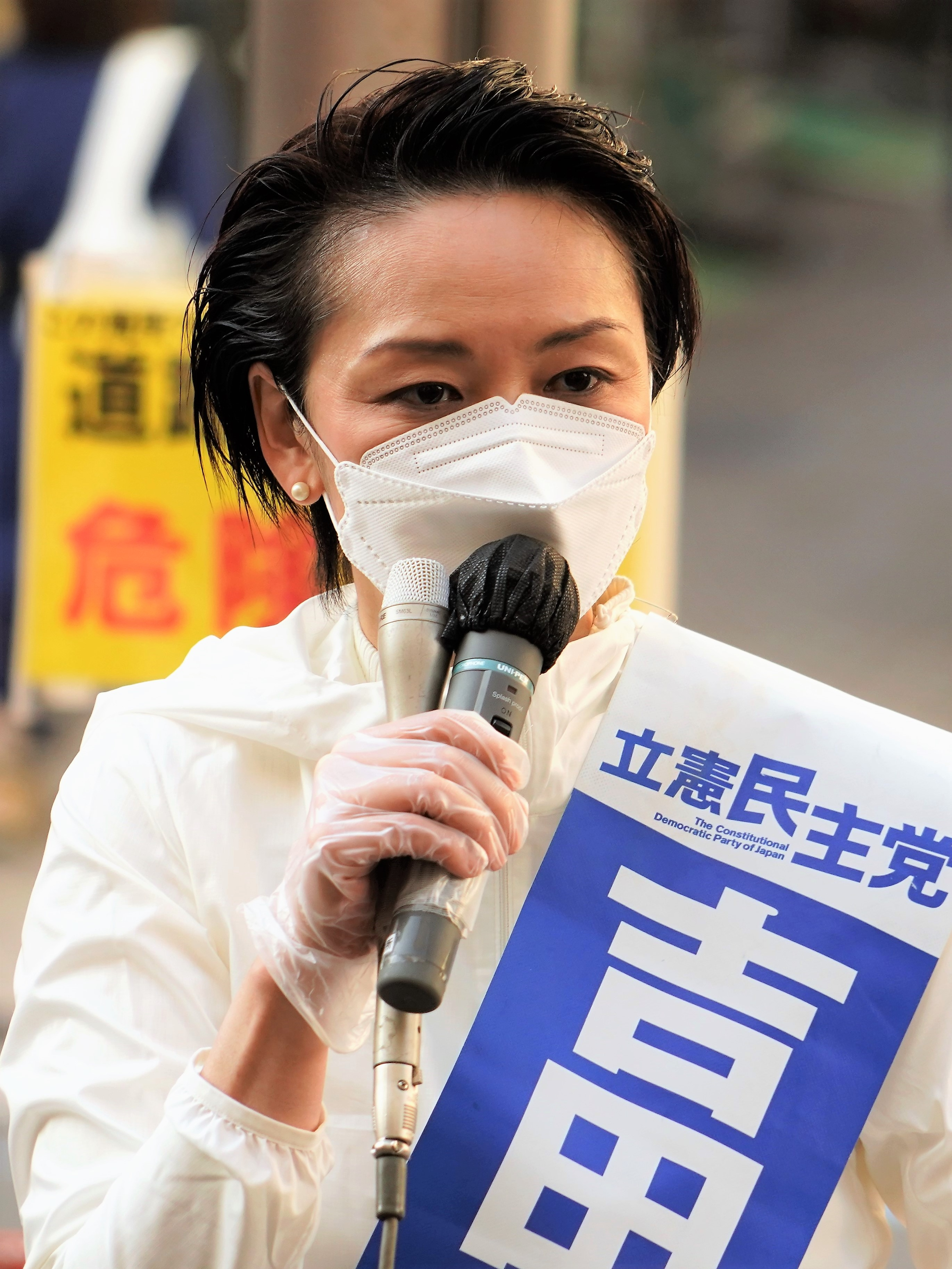

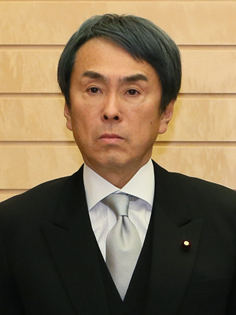
Nominee	Harumi Yoshida	Nobuteru Ishihara	Keiji Kasatani
Party	CDP	LDP	Ishin
Popular vote	137,341	105,381	40,763
Percentage	48.45%	37.17%	14.38%
Japanese Representative before election
Nobuteru Ishihara
LDP
Elected Japanese Representative
Harumi Yoshida
CDP

Incumbent				Elected Member	
Member	Party	First elected	Status	Member	Party
Nobuteru Ishihara	LDP	1990	Incumbent defeated.	Harumi Yoshida	CDP

== Tokyo 9th district ==
2021 Tokyo 9th district election
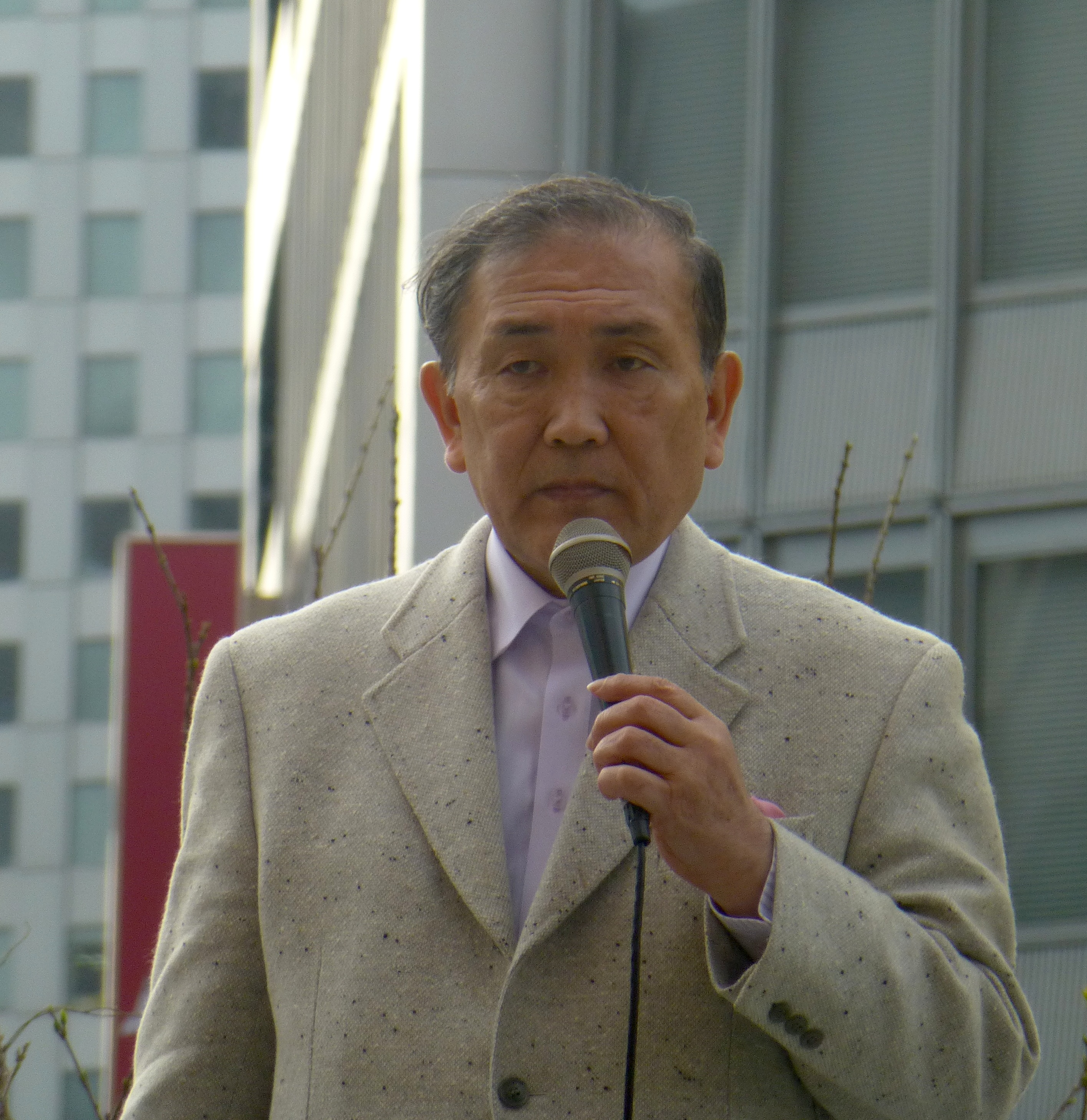
Nominee	Issei Yamagishi	Takao Ando	Jun Minami
Party	CDP	LDP	Ishin
Popular vote	109,489	95,284	47,842
Percentage	40.90%	35.59%	17.87%
Nominee	Kōki Kobayashi
Party	New Party Yamato
Popular vote	15,091
Percentage	5.64%
Japanese Representative before election
Vacant
Elected Japanese Representative
Issei Yamagishi
CDP

Incumbent				Elected Member	
Member	Party	First elected	Status	Member	Party
Vacant (last held by Isshu Sugawara)	– (Independent)	ー	CDP pick up.	Issei Yamagishi	CDP

== Tokyo 10th district ==
2021 Tokyo 10th district election
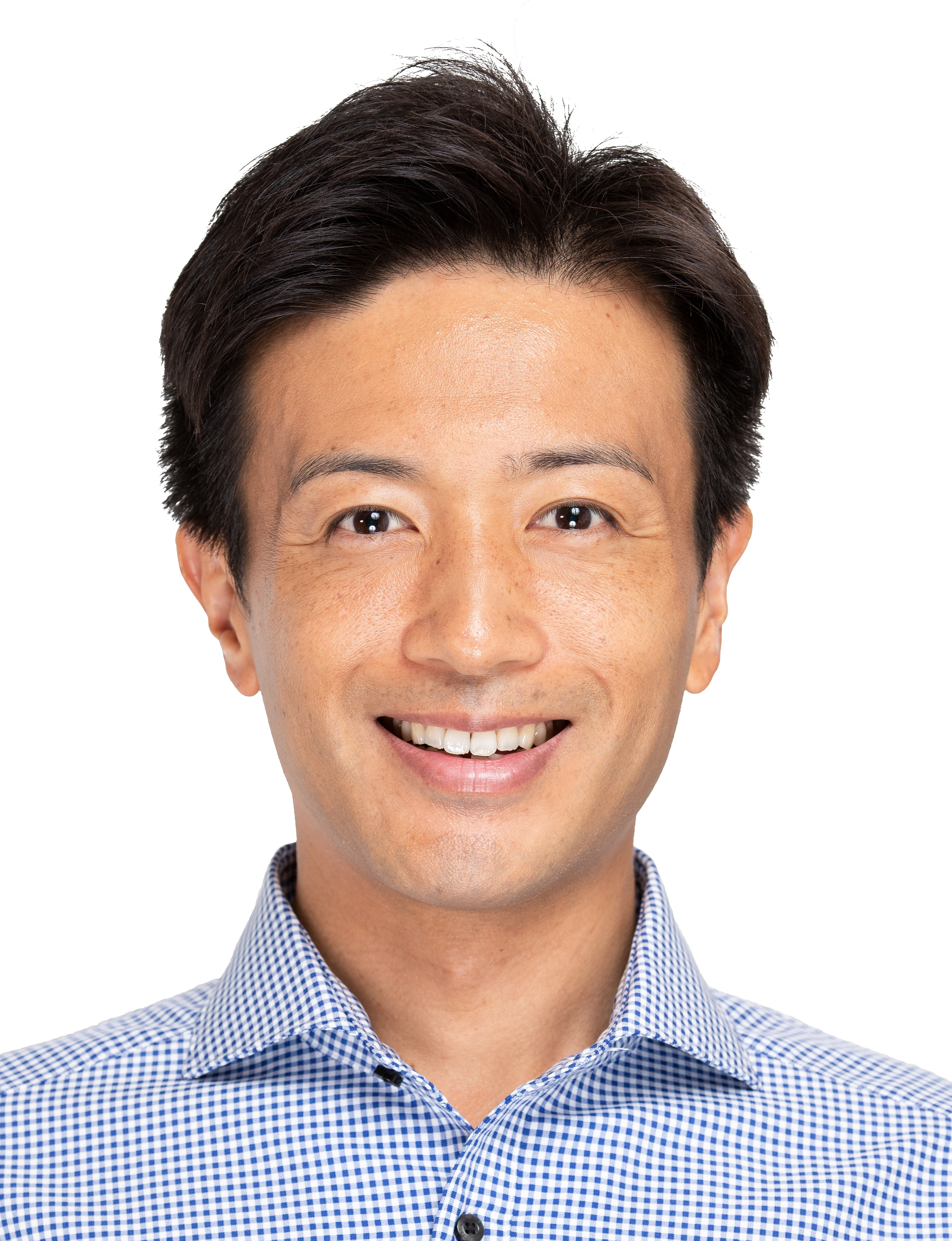

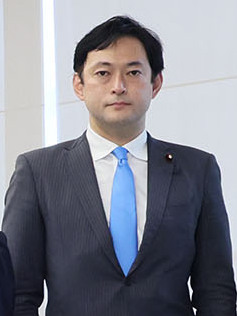
Nominee	Hayato Suzuki	Yosuke Suzuki	Takashi Fujikawa
Party	LDP	CDP	Ishin
Popular vote	115,122	107,920	30,574
Percentage	43.80%	41.06%	11.63%
Japanese Representative before election
Hayato Suzuki
LDP
Elected Japanese Representative
Hayato Suzuki
LDP

Incumbent				Elected Member	
Member	Party	First elected	Status	Member	Party
Hayato Suzuki	LDP	2014	Incumbent reelected.	Hayato Suzuki	LDP

== Tokyo 11th district ==
2021 Tokyo 11th district election
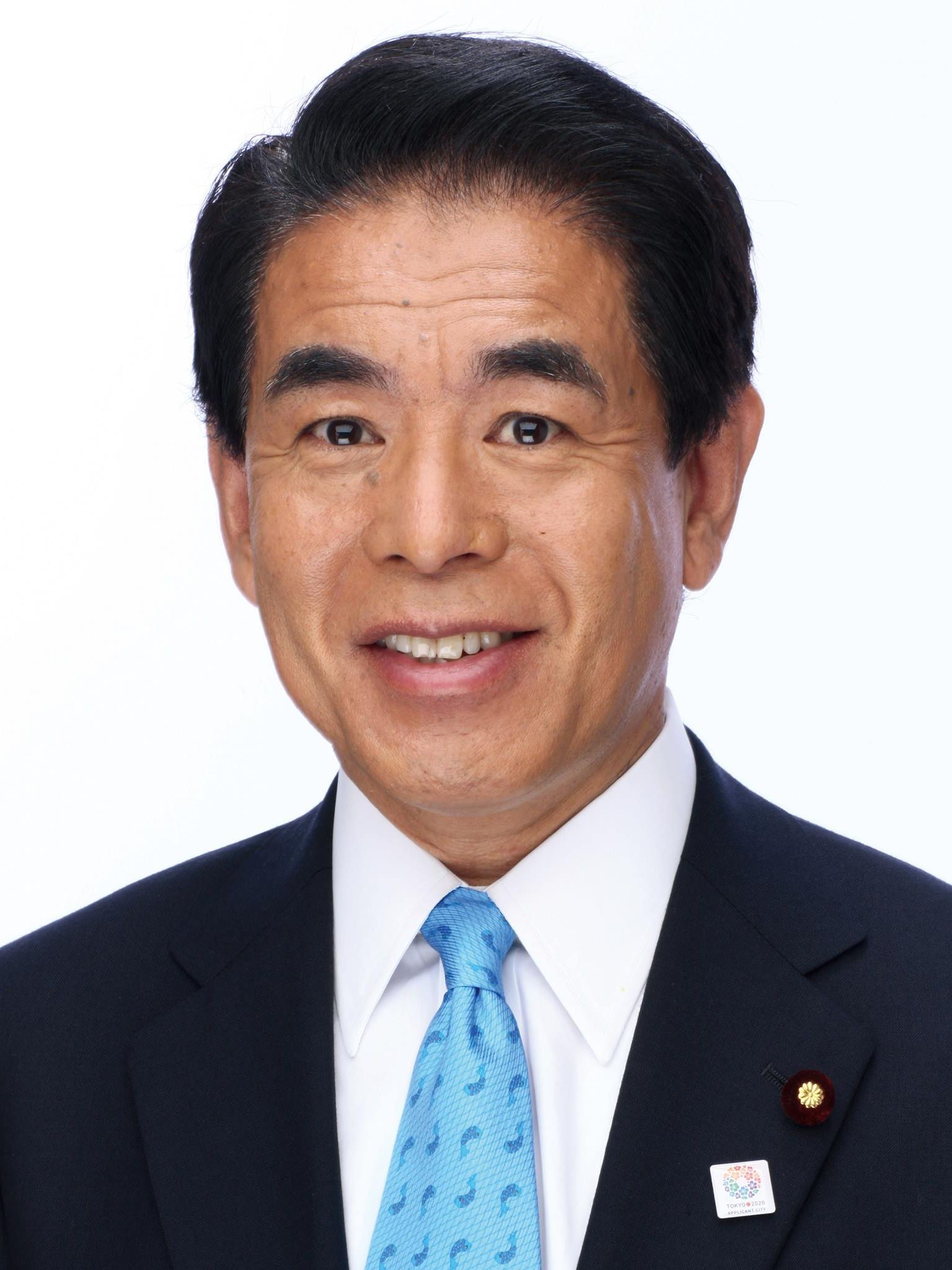

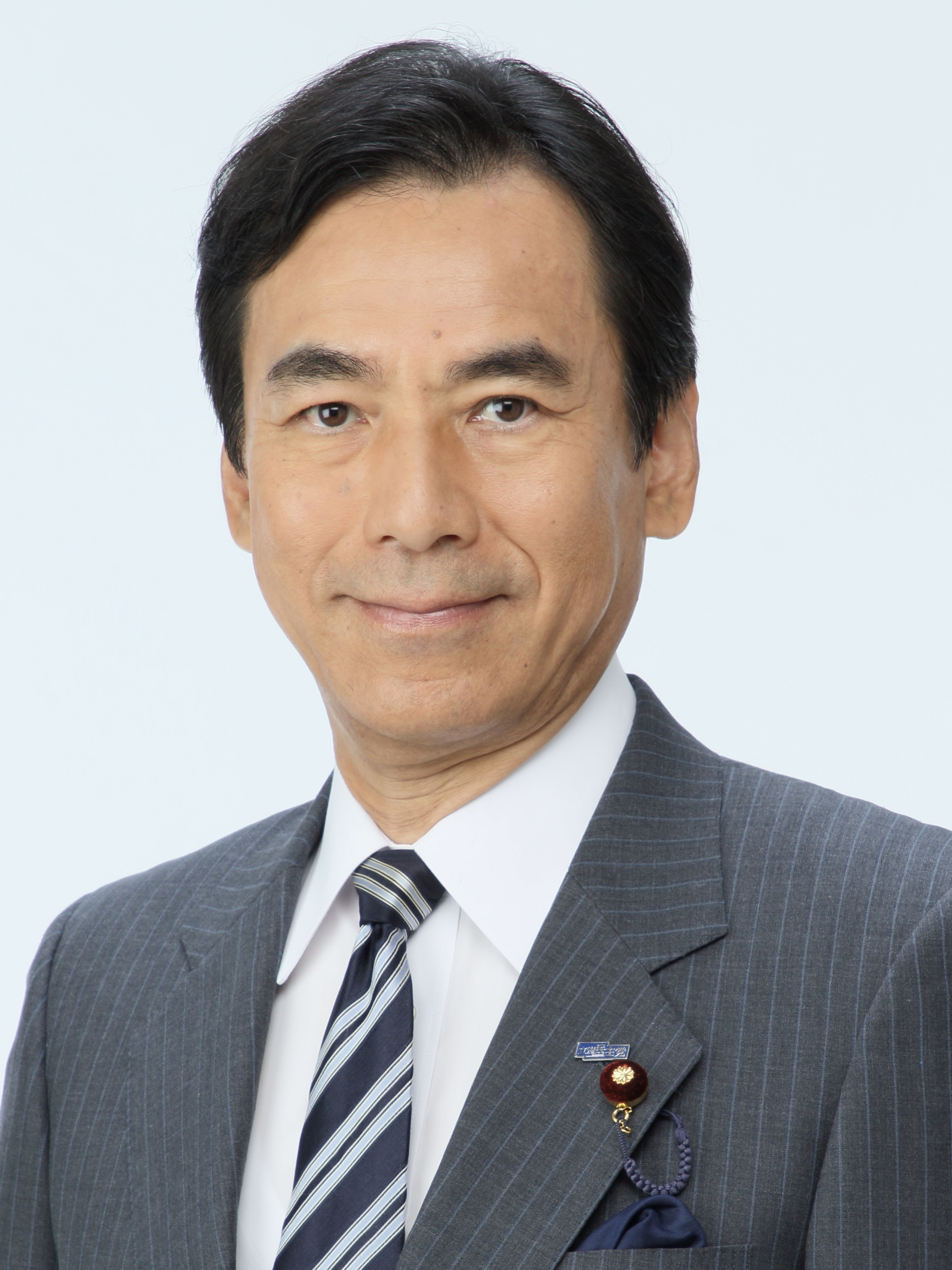
Nominee	Hakubun Shimomura	Yukihiko Akutsu	Shūto Nishinohara
Party	LDP	CDP	JCP
Popular vote	122,465	87,635	29,304
Percentage	49.98%	35.76%	11.96%
Japanese Representative before election
Hakubun Shimomura
LDP
Elected Japanese Representative
Hakubun Shimomura
LDP

Incumbent				Elected Member	
Member	Party	First elected	Status	Member	Party
Hakubun Shimomura	LDP	1996	Incumbent reelected.	Hakubun Shimomura	LDP

== Tokyo 12th district ==
2021 Tokyo 12th district election
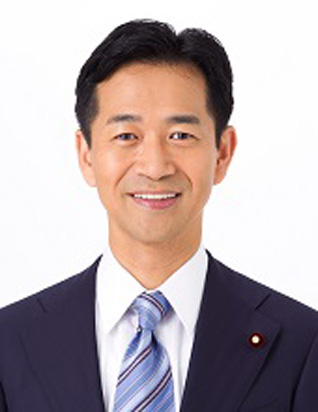
Nominee	Mitsunari Okamoto	Tsukasa Abe	Saori Ikeuchi
Party	Komeito	Ishin	JCP
Popular vote	101,020	80,323	71,948
Percentage	39.88%	31.71%	28.41%
Japanese Representative before election
Akihiro Ōta
Komeito
Elected Japanese Representative
Mitsunari Okamoto
Komeito

Incumbent				Elected Member	
Member	Party	First elected	Status	Member	Party
Akihiro Ōta	Komeito	1993	Incumbent retired. Komeito hold.	Mitsunari Okamoto	Komeito

== Tokyo 13th district ==
2021 Tokyo 13th district election
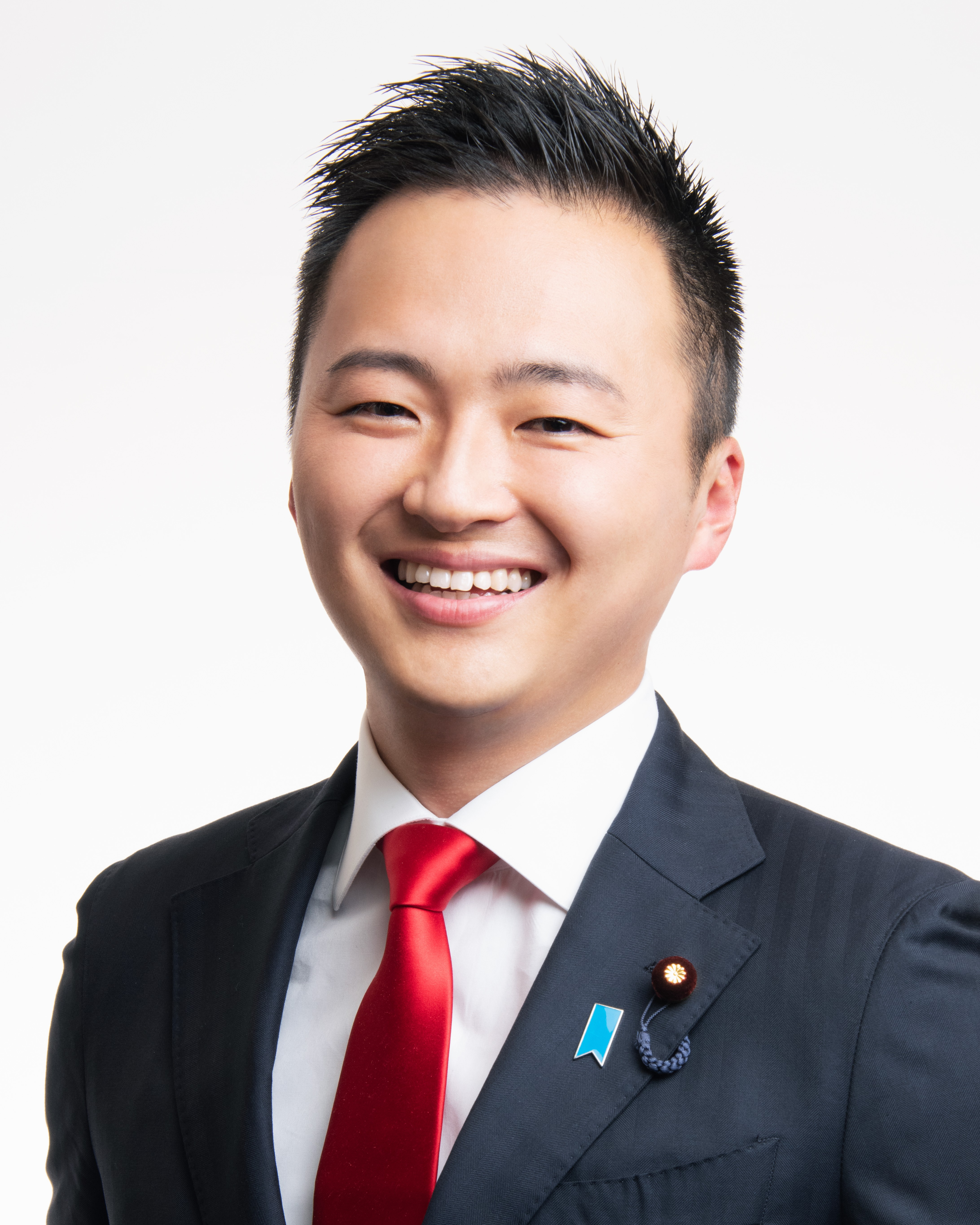
Nominee	Shin Tsuchida	Tomohiko Kitajo	Shingo Sawada
Party	LDP	CDP	JCP
Popular vote	115,669	78,665	30,204
Percentage	49.31%	33.54%	12.88%
Japanese Representative before election
Ichirō Kamoshita
LDP
Elected Japanese Representative
Shin Tsuchida
LDP

Incumbent				Elected Member	
Member	Party	First elected	Status	Member	Party
Ichirō Kamoshita	LDP	1993	Incumbent retired. LDP hold.	Shin Tsuchida	LDP

== Tokyo 14th district ==
2021 Tokyo 14th district election
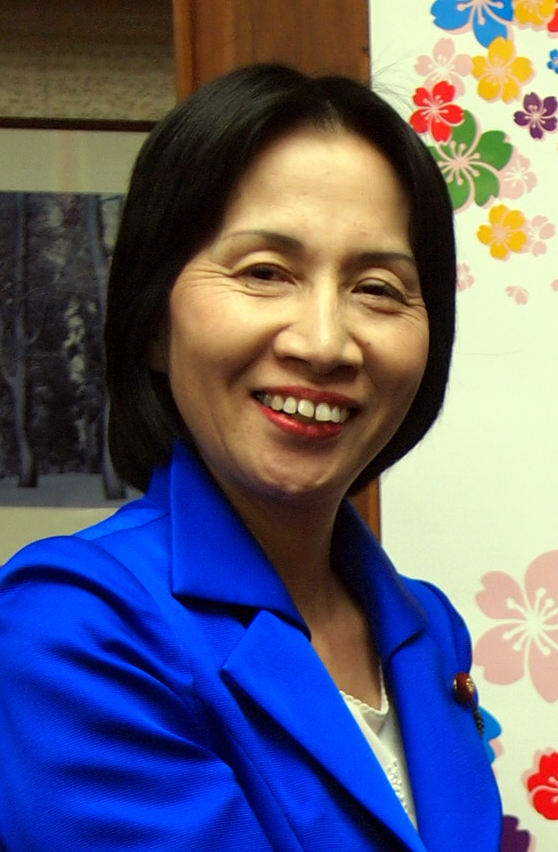
Nominee	Midori Matsushima	Taketsuka Kimura	Emi Nishimura
Party	LDP	CDP	Ishin
Popular vote	108,681	80,932	49,517
Percentage	43.28%	32.23%	19.72%
Japanese Representative before election
Midori Matsushima
LDP
Elected Japanese Representative
Midori Matsushima
LDP

Incumbent				Elected Member	
Member	Party	First elected	Status	Member	Party
Midori Matsushima	LDP	2000	Incumbent reelected.	Midori Matsushima	LDP

== Tokyo 15th district ==
2021 Tokyo 15th district election
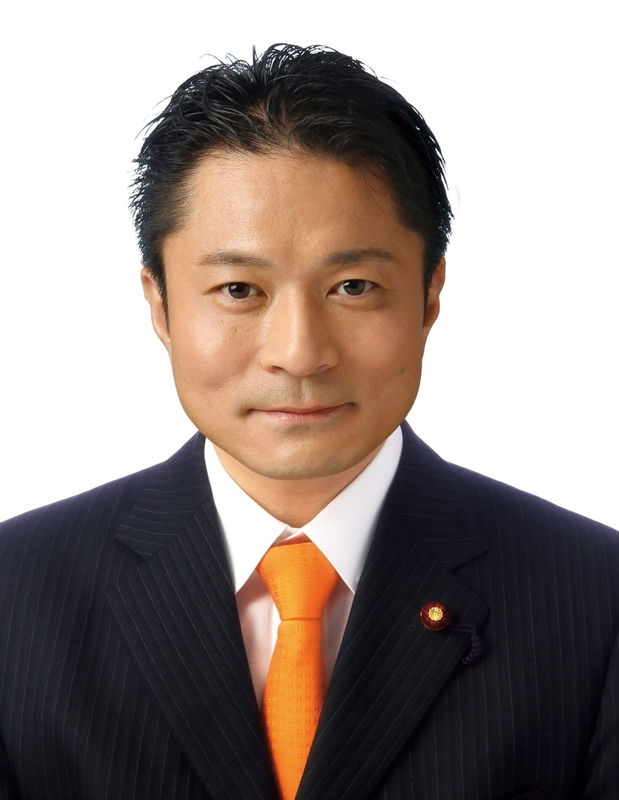

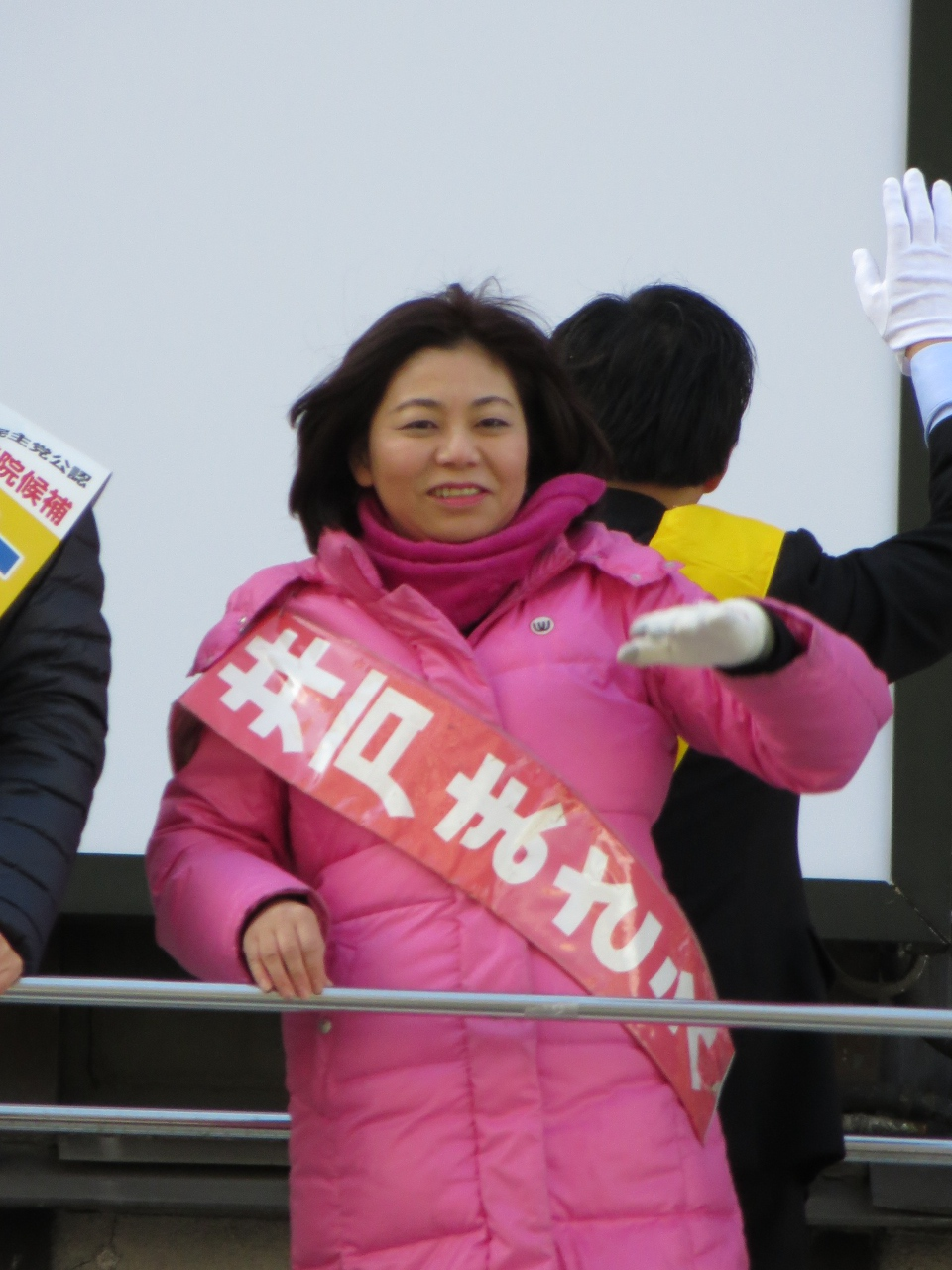
Nominee	Mito Kakizawa	Masae Ido	Yui Kanazawa
Party	Independent	CDP	Ishin
Alliance	LDP
Popular vote	76,261	58,978	44,882
Percentage	32.00%	24.75%	18.83%
Nominee	Hirofumi Imamura	Takashi Ino
Party	Independent	Independent
Alliance	LDP
Popular vote	26,628	17,514
Percentage	11.17%	7.35%
Japanese Representative before election
Tsukasa Akimoto
Independent
Elected Japanese Representative
Mito Kakizawa
Independent

Incumbent				Elected Member	
Member	Party	First elected	Status	Member	Party
Tsukasa Akimoto	Independent	2012	Incumbent retired. Incumbent pick up.	Mito Kakizawa	Independent (Note: The LDP additionally nominated Kakizawa as a LDP candidate after the election.)

== Tokyo 16th district ==
2021 Tokyo 16th district election
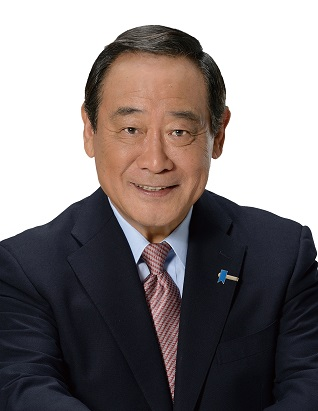

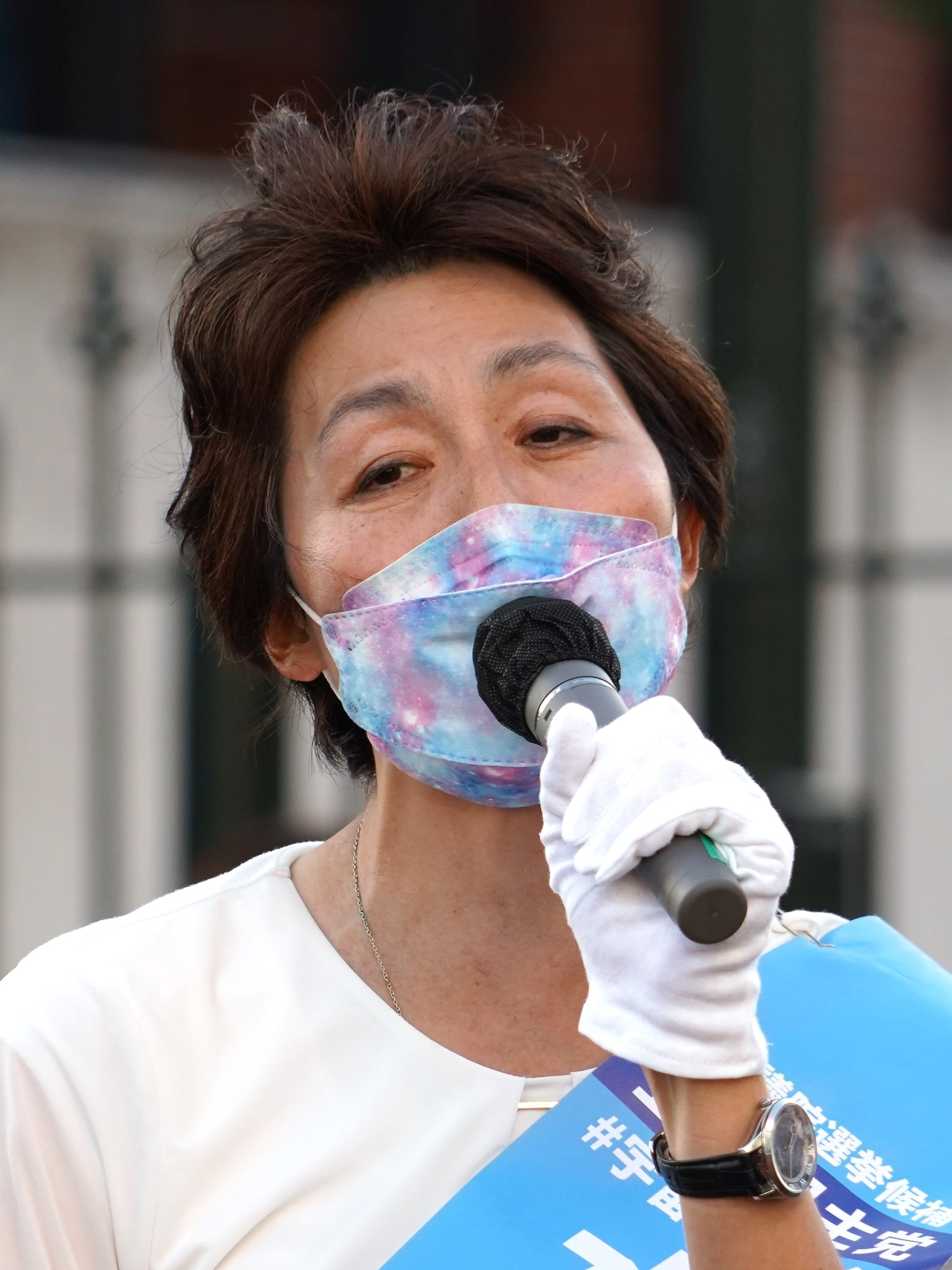

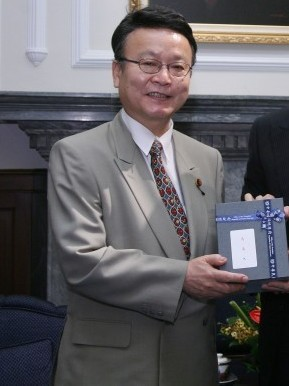
Nominee	Hideo Ōnishi	Motoko Mizuno	Hirosato Nakatsugawa
Party	LDP	CDP	Ishin
Popular vote	88,758	68,397	39,290
Percentage	38.67%	29.80%	17.12%
Nominee	Ayaka Ōta
Party	JCP
Popular vote	26,819
Percentage	11.68%
Japanese Representative before election
Hideo Ōnishi
LDP
Elected Japanese Representative
Hideo Ōnishi
LDP

Incumbent				Elected Member	
Member	Party	First elected	Status	Member	Party
Hideo Ōnishi	LDP	2012	Incumbent reelected.	Hideo Ōnishi	LDP

== Tokyo 17th district ==
2021 Tokyo 17th district election
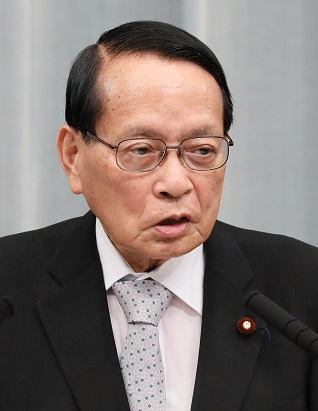
Nominee	Katsuei Hirasawa	Sachiko Inokuchi	Sugio Arai
Party	LDP	Ishin	JCP
Popular vote	119,384	52,260	36,309
Percentage	50.15%	21.95%	15.25%
Nominee	Yoriko Madoka
Party	Democratic Party for the People
Popular vote	30,103
Percentage	12.65%
Japanese Representative before election
Katsuei Hirasawa
LDP
Elected Japanese Representative
Katsuei Hirasawa
LDP

Incumbent				Elected Member	
Member	Party	First elected	Status	Member	Party
Katsuei Hirasawa	LDP	1996	Incumbent reelected.	Katsuei Hirasawa	LDP

== Tokyo 18th district ==
2021 Tokyo 18th district election
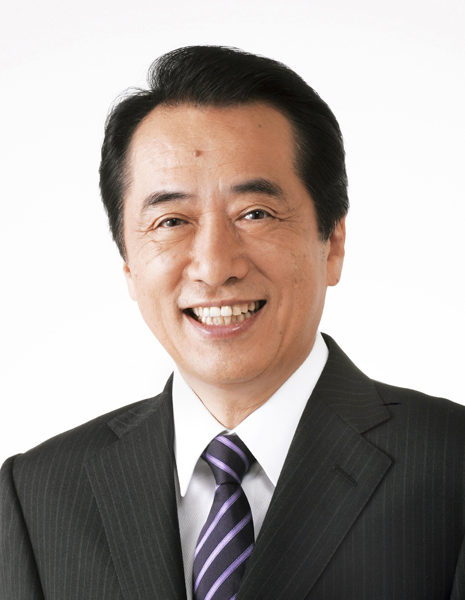

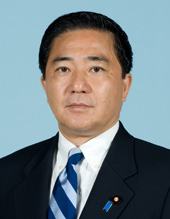
Nominee	Naoto Kan	Akihisa Nagashima	Masami Koyasu
Party	CDP	LDP	Independent
Popular vote	122,091	115,881	21,151
Percentage	47.12%	44.72%	8.16%
Japanese Representative before election
Naoto Kan
CDP
Elected Japanese Representative
Naoto Kan
CDP

Incumbent				Elected Member	
Member	Party	First elected	Status	Member	Party
Naoto Kan	CDP	1980	Incumbent reelected.	Naoto Kan	CDP

== Tokyo 19th district ==
2021 Tokyo 19th district election
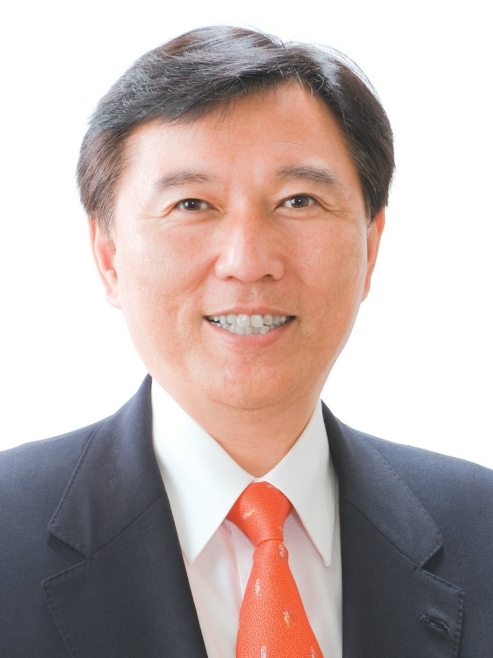

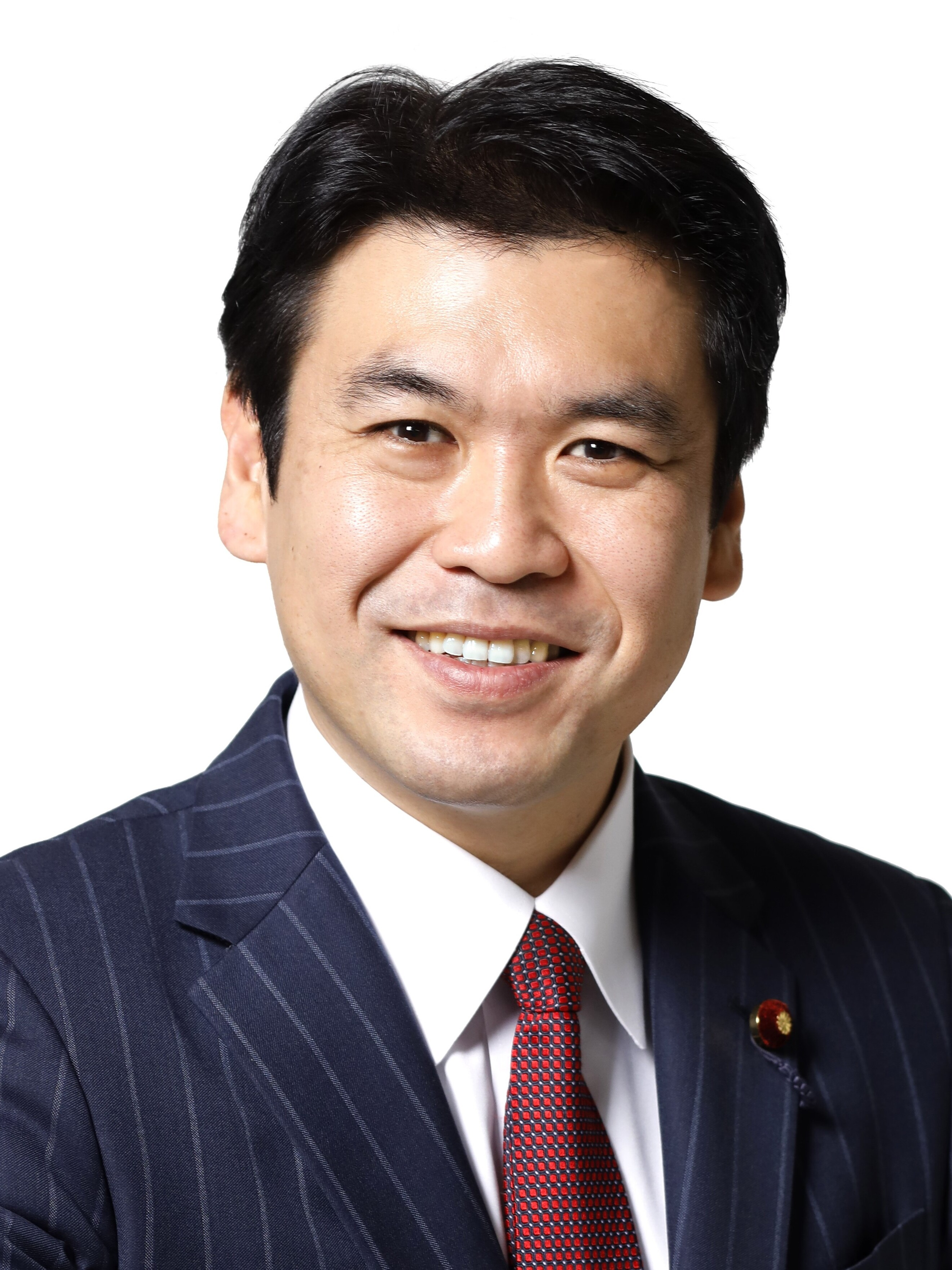
Nominee	Yoshinori Suematsu	Yohei Matsumoto	Hideaki Yamazaki
Party	CDP	LDP	Ishin
Popular vote	111,267	109,131	38,182
Percentage	43.03%	42.20%	14.77%
Japanese Representative before election
Yohei Matsumoto
LDP
Elected Japanese Representative
Yoshinori Suematsu
CDP

Incumbent				Elected Member	
Member	Party	First elected	Status	Member	Party
Yohei Matsumoto	LDP	2005	Incumbent defeated. (Won PR seat.)	Yoshinori Suematsu	CDP

== Tokyo 20th district ==
2021 Tokyo 20th district election
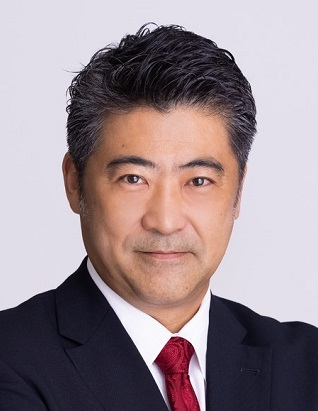
Nominee	Seiji Kihara	Toru Miyamoto	Junichiro Maeda
Party	LDP	JCP	Ishin
Popular vote	121,621	66,516	43,089
Percentage	52.60%	28.77%	18.64%
Japanese Representative before election
Seiji Kihara
LDP
Elected Japanese Representative
Seiji Kihara
LDP

Incumbent				Elected Member	
Member	Party	First elected	Status	Member	Party
Seiji Kihara	LDP	2005	Incumbent reelected.	Seiji Kihara	LDP

== Tokyo 21st district ==
2021 Tokyo 21st district election
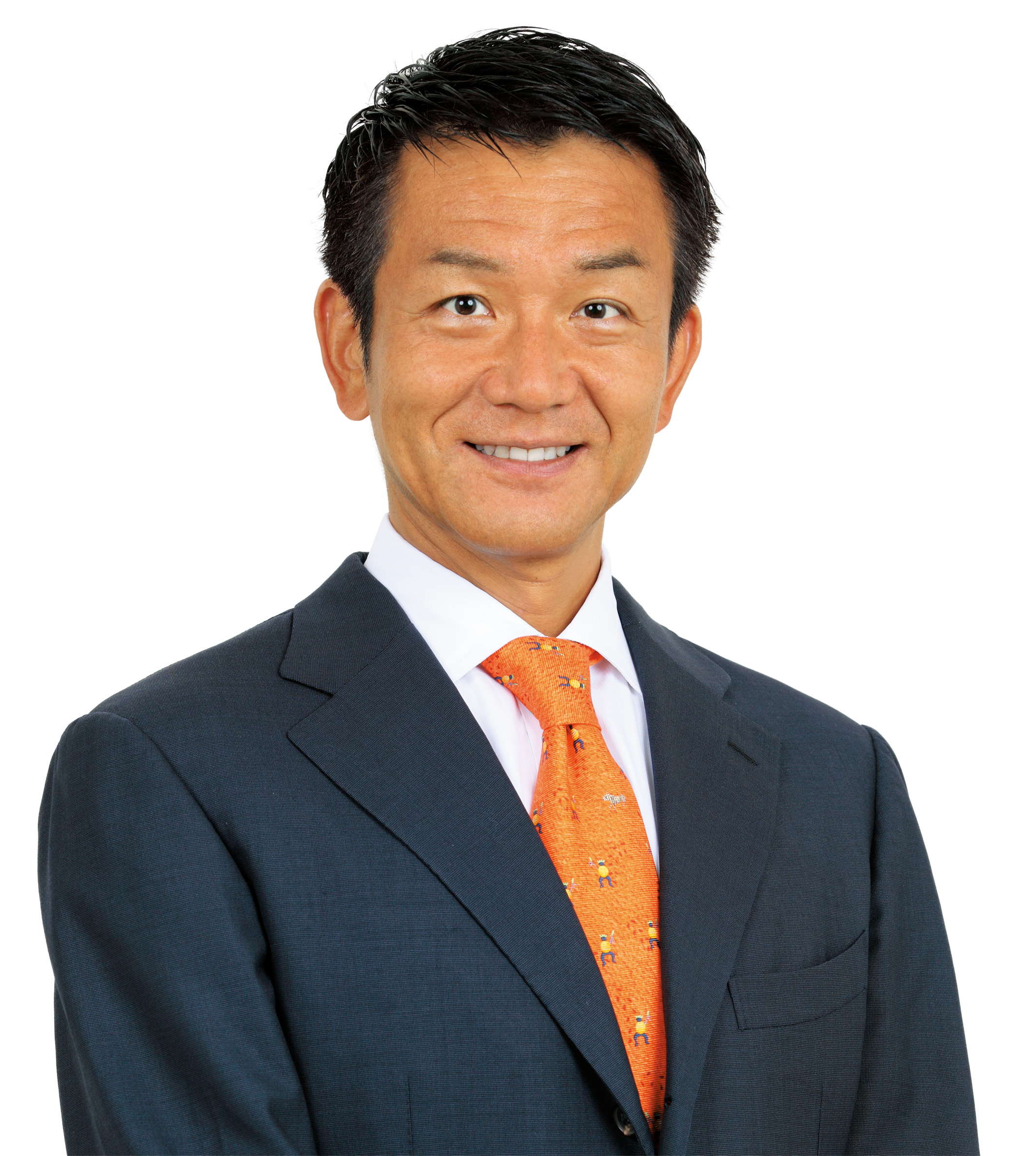

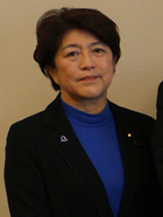
Nominee	Kiyoshi Odawara	Masako Ōkawara	Mitsuaki Takeda
Party	LDP	CDP	Ishin
Popular vote	112,433	99,090	35,527
Percentage	45.51%	40.11%	14.38%
Japanese Representative before election
Akihisa Nagashima
LDP
Elected Japanese Representative
Kiyoshi Odawara
LDP

Incumbent				Elected Member	
Member	Party	First elected	Status	Member	Party
Akihisa Nagashima	LDP	2003	Move to Tokyo 18th.	Kiyoshi Odawara	LDP

== Tokyo 22nd district ==
2021 Tokyo 22nd district election
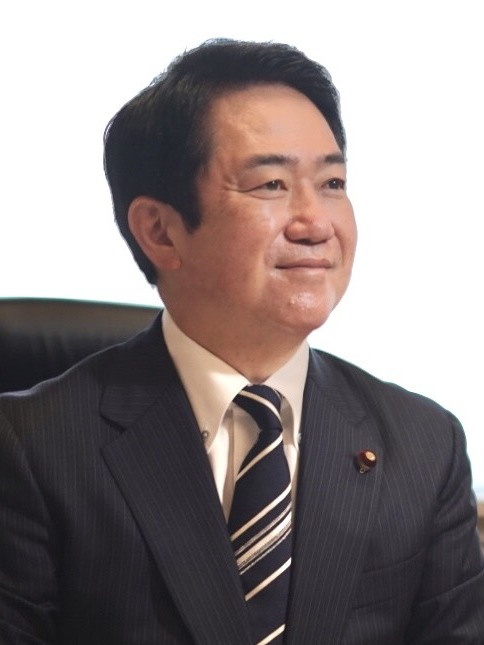

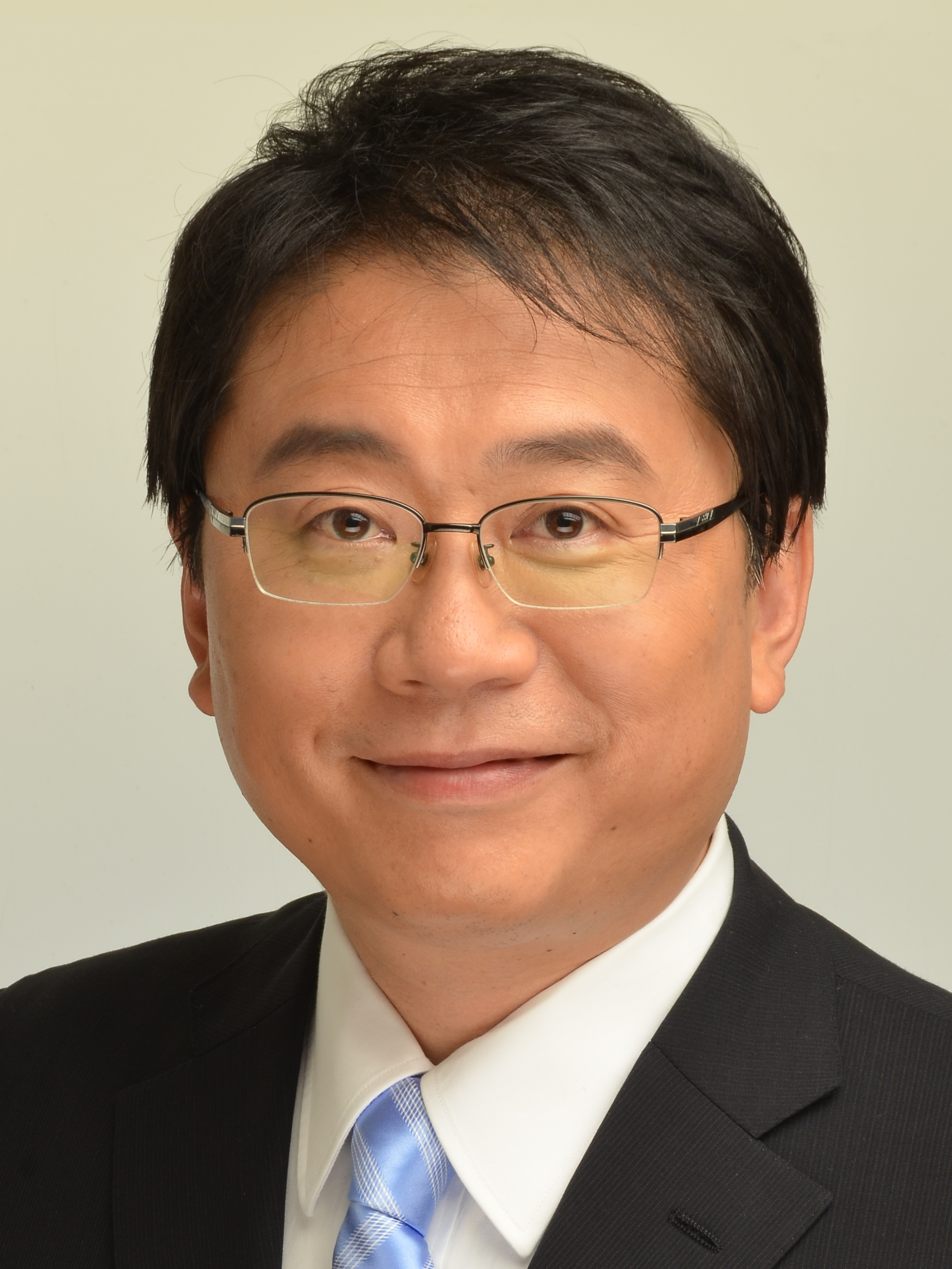

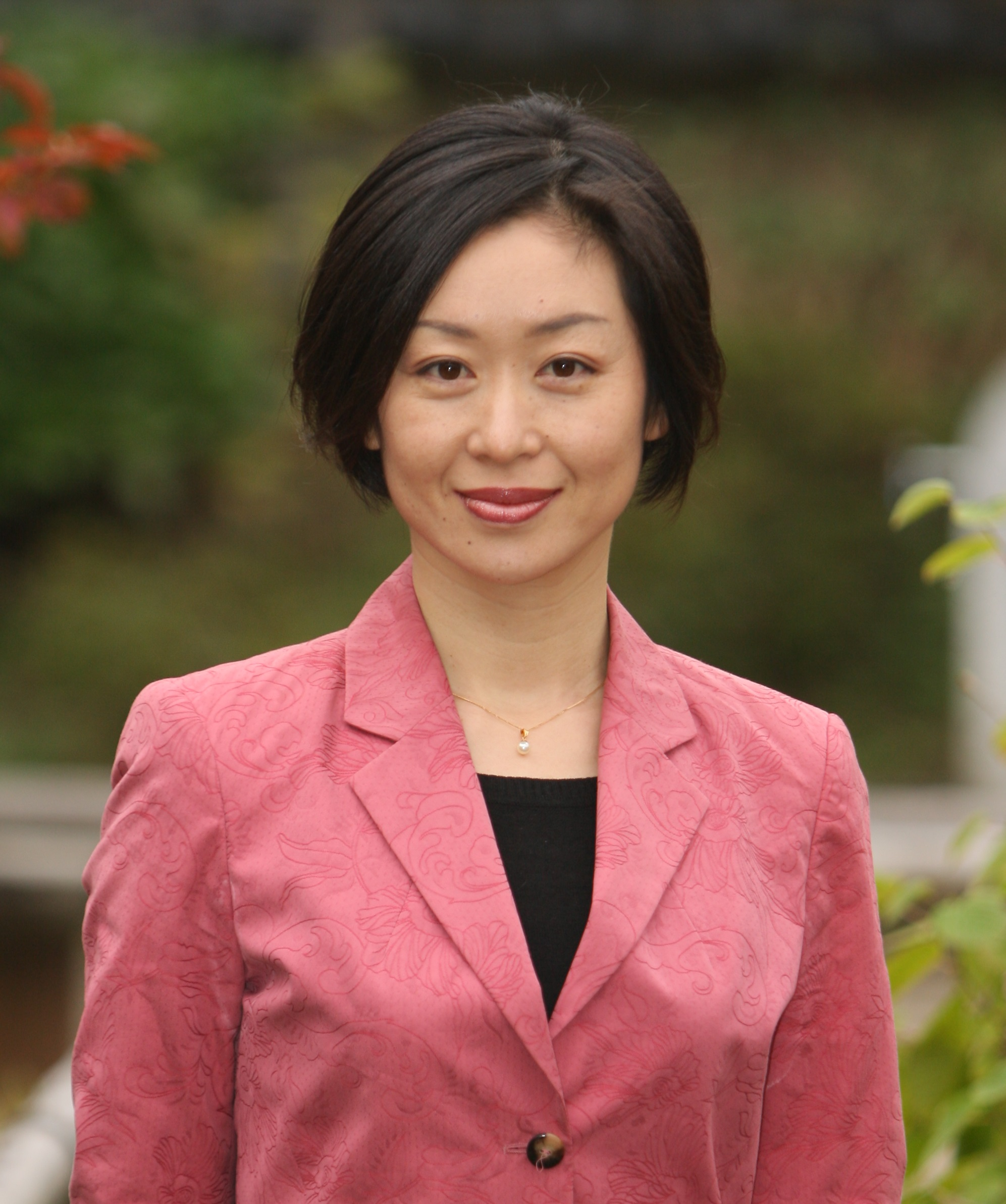
Nominee	Tatsuya Ito	Ikuo Yamahana	Mari Kushibuchi
Party	LDP	CDP	Reiwa
Popular vote	131,351	112,393	31,981
Percentage	46.87%	40.10%	11.41%
Japanese Representative before election
Tatsuya Ito
LDP
Elected Japanese Representative
Tatsuya Ito
LDP

Incumbent				Elected Member	
Member	Party	First elected	Status	Member	Party
Tatsuya Ito	LDP	1993	Incumbent reelected.	Tatsuya Ito	LDP

== Tokyo 23rd district ==
2021 Tokyo 23rd district election
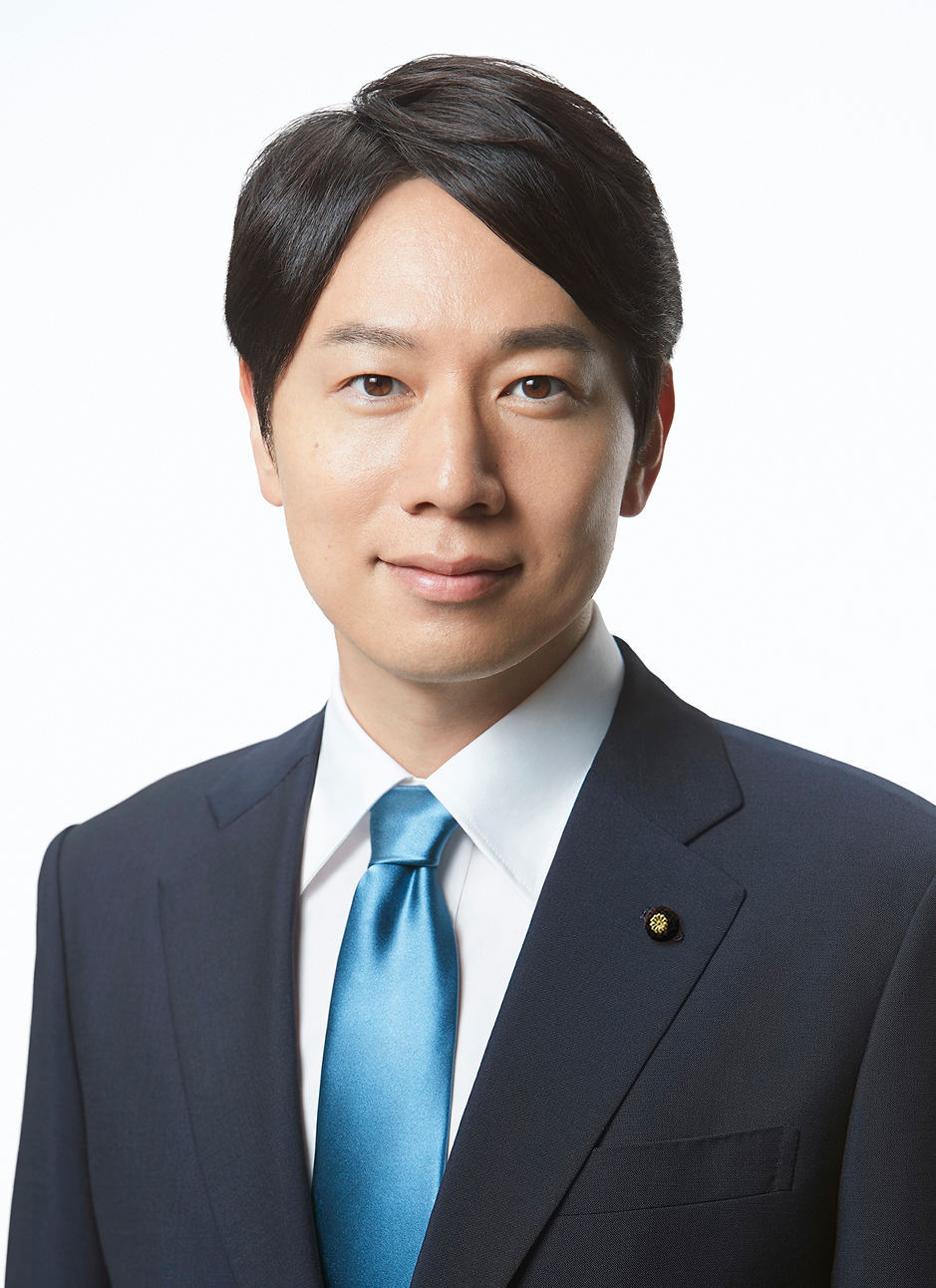
Nominee	Masanobu Ogura	Shunsuke Ito
Party	LDP	CDP
Popular vote	133,206	126,732
Percentage	51.25%	48.75%
Japanese Representative before election
Masanobu Ogura
LDP
Elected Japanese Representative
Masanobu Ogura
LDP

Incumbent				Elected Member	
Member	Party	First elected	Status	Member	Party
Masanobu Ogura	LDP	2012	Incumbent reelected.	Masanobu Ogura	LDP

== Tokyo 24th district ==
2021 Tokyo 24th district election
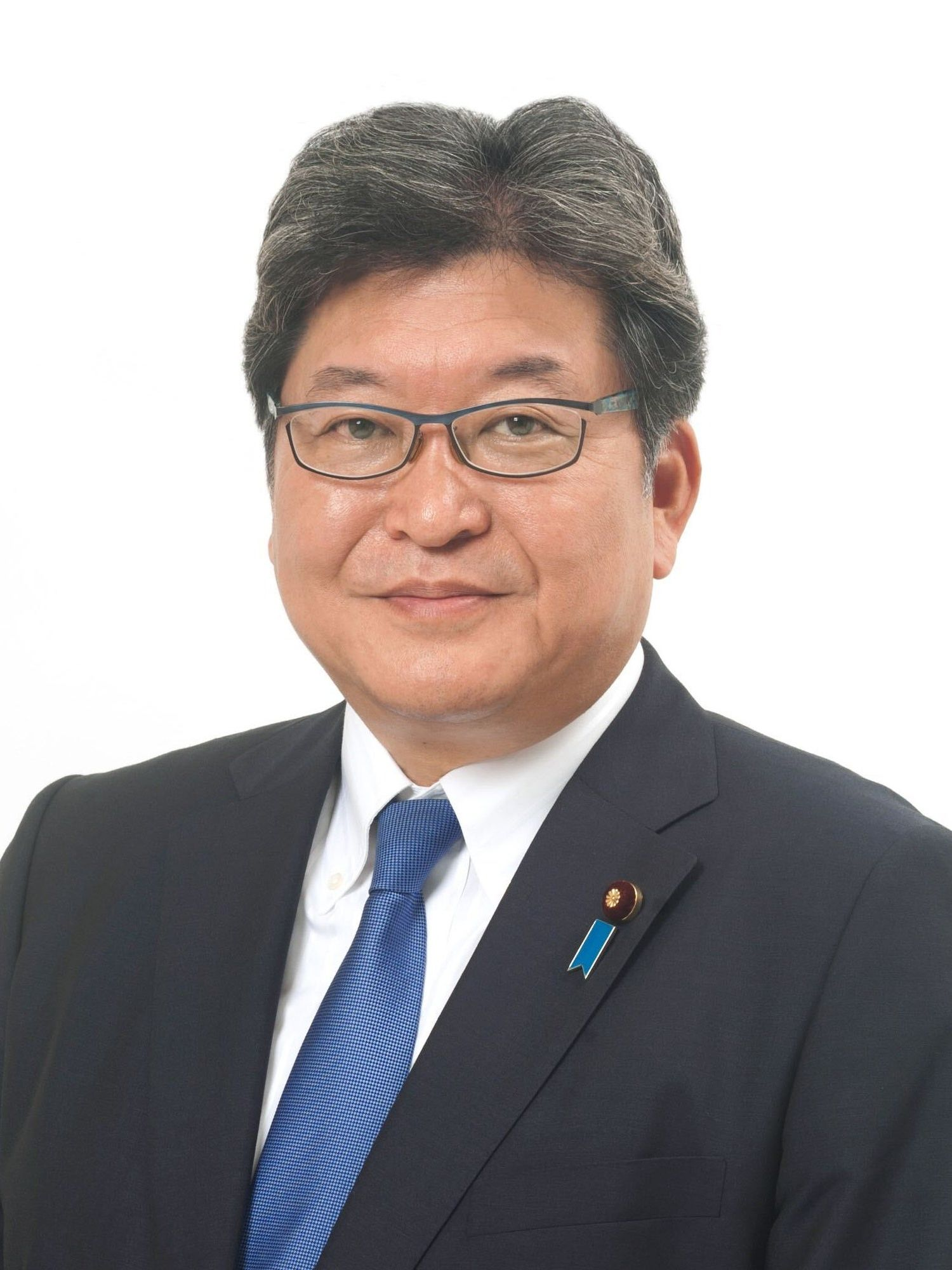
Nominee	Kōichi Hagiuda	Yumi Sato	Honoka Yoshikawa
Party	LDP	Democratic Party for the People	JCP
Popular vote	149,152	44,546	44,474
Percentage	58.55%	17.49%	17.46%
Nominee	Reiko Asakura
Party	Social Democratic
Popular vote	16,590
Percentage	6.51%
Japanese Representative before election
Kōichi Hagiuda
LDP
Elected Japanese Representative
Kōichi Hagiuda
LDP

Incumbent				Elected Member	
Member	Party	First elected	Status	Member	Party
Kōichi Hagiuda	LDP	2003	Incumbent reelected.	Koichi Hagiuda	LDP

== Tokyo 25th district ==
2021 Tokyo 25th district election
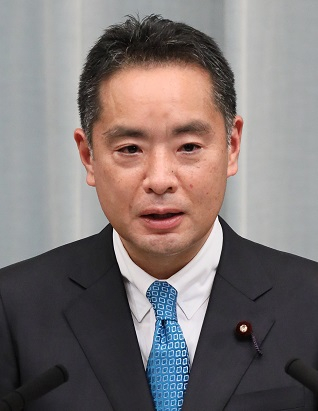
Nominee	Shinji Inoue	Yukinari Shimada
Party	LDP	CDP
Popular vote	131,430	89,991
Percentage	59.36%	40.64%
Japanese Representative before election
Shinji Inoue
LDP
Elected Japanese Representative
Shinji Inoue
LDP

Incumbent				Elected Member	
Member	Party	First elected	Status	Member	Party
Shinji Inoue	LDP	2003	Incumbent reelected.	Shinji Inoue	LDP

== Proportional representation block ==
Proportional Representation block results
Party	Votes	Percentage	Seats
LDP	2,000,084	31.0%	6
CDP	1,293,281	20.1%	4
Ishin	858,577	11.5%	2
Komeito	715,450	11.1%	2
Communist	670,340	10.4%	2
Reiwa	360,387	5.6%	1
DPP	306,179	4.7%	0
SDP	92,995	1.4%	0
Anti-NHK	92,353	1.4%	0
Japan First Party	33,661	0.5%	0
Yamato Party	16,970	0.3%	0
New Party to Strengthen Corona Countermeasures by Change of Government	6,620	0.1%	0

Party	Elected Member	District
LDP	Kei Takagi	ー
LDP	Yohei Matsumoto	Tokyo 19th
LDP	Takao Ochi	Tokyo 6th
LDP	Kenji Wakamiya	Tokyo 5th
LDP	Akihisa Nagashima	Tokyo 18th
LDP	Hirotaka Ishihara	Tokyo 3rd
CDP	Shunsuke Ito	Tokyo 23rd
CDP	Yosuke Suzuki	Tokyo 10th
CDP	Banri Kaieda	Tokyo 1st
CDP	Masako Ōkawara	Tokyo 21st
Ishin	Tsukasa Abe	Tokyo 12th
Ishin	Taisuke Ono	Tokyo 1st
Komeito	Yōsuke Takagi	ー
Komeito	Koichi Kasai	ー
Communist	Akira Kasai	ー
Communist	Toru Miyamoto	Tokyo 20th
Reiwa	Taro Yamamoto	ー
