= Tokyo 5th district =

Japanese House of Representatives constituency

Tokyo 5th District
- Parliamentary constituency for the Japanese House of Representatives
- Numbered map of inner Tokyo single-member districts
- Prefecture: Tokyo
- Proportional District: Tokyo

Current constituency
- Created: 1994
- Seats: One
- Party: LDP
- Representative: Kenji Wakamiya
- Wards: Parts of Setagaya

Tokyo's 5th district is a single-member constituency of the House of Representatives, the lower house of the national Diet of Japan. It is located in Tokyo, and consists of a part of Setagaya, one of Tokyo's 23 special wards.

== List of representatives ==
Election	Representative	Party	Notes
1996	Takashi Kosugi	Liberal Democratic	
2000	Yoshio Tezuka	Democratic	
2003	Yoshio Tezuka	Democratic	
2005	Takashi Kosugi	Liberal Democratic	
2009	Yoshio Tezuka	Democratic	
2012	Kenji Wakamiya	Liberal Democratic	
2014	Kenji Wakamiya	Liberal Democratic	
2017	Kenji Wakamiya	Liberal Democratic	
2021	Yoshio Tezuka	CDP	
2024	Yoshio Tezuka	CDP	
2026	Kenji Wakamiya	Liberal Democratic	

== Election results ==
2026
Party	Candidate	Votes	%	±%
LDP	Kenji Wakamiya	89,078	39.1	▲6.4
Centrist Reform	Yoshio Tezuka	58,164	25.5	▼13.9
DPP	Yukiko Kuwazuru	33,140	14.5	
Ishin	Tarō Inaba	27,889	12.2	▼5.1
Sanseitō	Toshiko Matsuoka	19,809	8.7	▲2.1
Registered electors		376,754		
Turnout			62.11	▲3.70
LDP gain from Centrist Reform				

2024
Party	Candidate	Votes	%	±%
CDP	Yoshio Tezuka (incumbent)	83,016	39.38%	▼1.6%
LDP	Kenji Wakamiya	69,024	32.74%	▼6.25
Ishin	Tarō Inaba	36,493	17.31%	N/A
Sanseitō	Yōhei Nuruki	13,910	6.60%	New
Independent	Rima Hayashi	5,364	2.54%	
Independent	Kenta Matsumoto	1,889	0.90%	
Independent	Kenta Fukui	1,136	0.54%	
Turnout		210,832	58.41	▼1.62

2021
Party	Candidate	Votes	%	±%
CDP (endorsed by Reiwa, SDP)	Yoshio Tezuka (PR seat incumbent)	111,246	40.98	▼0.7
Liberal Democratic (endorsed by Komeito)	Kenji Wakamiya (incumbent) (won PR seat)	105,842	38.99	▼2.16
Innovation	Masafumi Tabuchi	54,363	20.03	New
Majority		5,404	1.99	
Registered electors		464,694		
Turnout			60.03	▲4.92
CDP gain from LDP				

2017
Party	Candidate	Votes	%	±%
Liberal Democratic (endorsed by Komeito)	Kenji Wakamiya (incumbent)	101,314	41.15	
CDP	Yoshio Tezuka (won PR seat)	99,182	40.28	New
Kibō no Tō	Mineyuki Fukuda (PR seat incumbent)	45,737	18.57	New
Majority		2,132	0.87	
Registered electors		459,031		
Turnout			55.11	▼0.05
LDP hold				

2014
Party	Candidate	Votes	%	±%
Liberal Democratic	Kenji Wakamiya (incumbent)	102,424	39.75	
Democratic (endorsed by Innovation)	Yoshio Tezuka	66,255	25.71	
Independent	Hidehiro Mitani (PR seat incumbent)	44,103	17.11	New
Communist	Masayo Sawai	32,140	12.47	
Independent	Dr. NakaMats	12,777	4.96	New
Majority		36,169	14.04	
Registered electors		482,615		
Turnout			55.16	▼8.10
LDP hold				

2012
Party	Candidate	Votes	%	±%
Liberal Democratic	Kenji Wakamiya	85,408	30.54	
Democratic (endorsed by PNP)	Yoshio Tezuka (incumbent)	65,778	23.52	
Your	Hidehiro Mitani (won PR seat)	46,629	16.67	New
Restoration	Tōru Watanabe	45,518	16.28	New
Tomorrow (endorsed by Daichi)	Yasuko Maruko	19,462	6.96	New
Communist	Iwao Miura	15,796	5.65	
Happiness Realization	Shusaku Soga	1,089	0.39	
Majority		19,630	7.02	
Registered electors		456,028		
Turnout			63.26	▼3.91
LDP gain from Democratic				

2009
Party	Candidate	Votes	%	±%
Democratic (endorsed by PNP)	Yoshio Tezuka	149,623	50.32	
Liberal Democratic	Yukari Sato (PR seat incumbent)	121,244	40.77	
Communist	Sakae Miyamoto	22,864	7.69	
Happiness Realization	Makoto Kinoshita	3,632	1.22	New
Majority		28,379	9.55	
Registered electors		450,606		
Turnout			67.17	▲1.48
Democratic gain from LDP				

2005
Party	Candidate	Votes	%	±%
Liberal Democratic	Takashi Kosugi (PR seat incumbent)	150,667	53.35	
Democratic	Yoshio Tezuka (incumbent)	109,618	38.82	
Communist	Teiko Hoshimi	22,107	7.83	
Majority		41,049	14.53	
Turnout			65.69	
LDP gain from Democratic				

2003
Party	Candidate	Votes	%	±%
Democratic	Yoshio Tezuka (incumbent)	107,110	44.10	
Liberal Democratic	Takashi Kosugi (won PR seat)	99,618	41.02	
Independent	Nobuhiko Endō	18,213	7.50	New
Communist	Sakae Miyamoto	17,927	7.38	
Majority		7,492	3.08	
Turnout				
Democratic hold				

2000
Party	Candidate	Votes	%	±%
Democratic	Yoshio Tezuka	83,619	34.87	New
Liberal Democratic	Takashi Kosugi (incumbent)	79,609	33.20	
Communist	Sakae Miyamoto	27,728	11.56	
Liberal	Nobuhiko Endō	26,390	11.00	New
Social Democratic	Jiro Tozawa	16,163	6.74	
Liberal League	Sachiko Saito	6,304	2.63	New
Majority		4,010	1.67	
Turnout				
Democratic gain from LDP				

1996
Party	Candidate	Votes	%	±%
Liberal Democratic	Takashi Kosugi	84,731	37.93	New
Democratic	Yoshio Tezuka	51,418	23.02	New
New Frontier	Sachiyo Nomura	43,347	19.40	New
Communist	Shuji Watanabe	28,514	12.76	New
Social Democratic	Jiro Tozawa	10,861	4.86	New
New Socialist	Naomi Miyamoto	4,524	2.03	New
Majority		33,313	14.91	
Turnout				
LDP win (new seat)				
