= Takashi Kosugi =

Japanese politician (born 1935)

- 小杉 隆
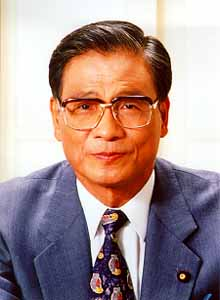
- Official portrait, 1996

Minister of Education
- In office 7 November 1996 – 11 September 1997
- Prime Minister: Ryutaro Hashimoto
- Preceded by: Mikio Okuda
- Succeeded by: Nobutaka Machimura

Member of the House of Representatives
- In office 10 November 2003 – 21 July 2009
- Preceded by: Multi-member district
- Succeeded by: Yoshio Tezuka
- Constituency: Tokyo PR (2003–2005); Tokyo 5th (2005–2009)
- In office 23 June 1980 – 2 June 2000
- Preceded by: Katsuya Ikeda
- Succeeded by: Yoshio Tezuka
- Constituency: Tokyo 3rd (1980–1996); Tokyo 5th (1996–2000)

Member of the Tokyo Metropolitan Assembly
- In office 23 July 1965 – 16 September 1979
- Constituency: Meguro Ward

Personal details
- Born: 25 September 1935 (age 91) Meguro, Tokyo, Japan
- Party: Liberal Democratic
- Other political affiliations: NLC (1977–1986)
- Education: University of Tokyo

Takashi Kosugi (小杉 隆, Kosugi Takashi; born 25 September 1935) is a retired Japanese politician of the Liberal Democratic Party, who served as a member of the House of Representatives in the Diet (national legislature).

== Early life ==
Kosugi is a native of Meguro, Tokyo and a graduate of the University of Tokyo.

== Political career ==
Kosugi served in the assembly of Tokyo for four terms from 1965.

He was elected to the House of Representatives for the first time in 1980 as a member of the New Liberal Club in 1980 after an unsuccessful run in 1979. He served as a representative until July 2009, except for the period between 2000 and 2003 when his lost his seat for one election cycle.

House of Representatives (Japan)
Preceded by Shinya Totsuka	Chair, Environmental Affairs Committee of the House of Representatives of Japan; 1991–1993	Succeeded by Shozo Harada
Political offices
Preceded by Mikio Okuda	Minister of Education; 1996–1997	Succeeded by Nobutaka Machimura
