= Kenji Wakamiya =

Japanese politician

- 若宮 健嗣
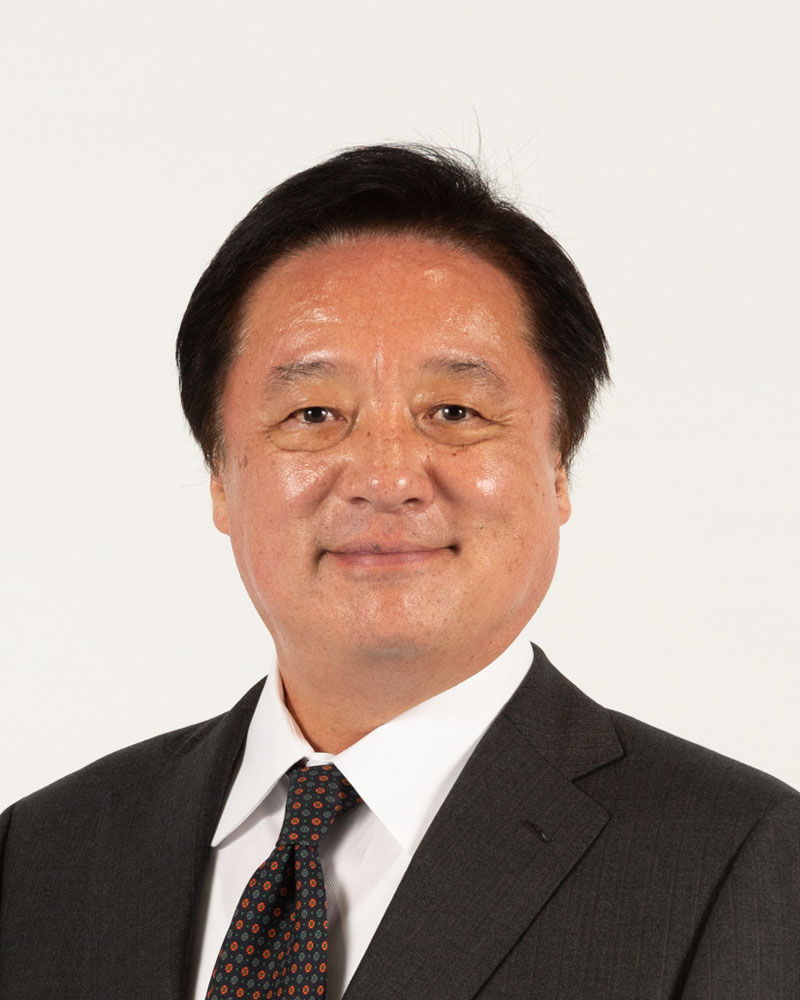
- Official portrait, 2024

Minister of State for "Cool Japan" Minister of State for the Intellectual Property Strategy
- In office 4 October 2021 – 10 August 2022
- Prime Minister: Fumio Kishida
- Preceded by: Shinji Inoue
- Succeeded by: Sanae Takaichi

Minister of State for Consumer Affairs and Food Safety
- In office 4 October 2021 – 10 August 2022
- Prime Minister: Fumio Kishida
- Preceded by: Shinji Inoue
- Succeeded by: Taro Kono

Minister for the World Expo 2025
- In office 4 October 2021 – 10 August 2022
- Prime Minister: Fumio Kishida
- Preceded by: Shinji Inoue
- Succeeded by: Naoki Okada

Member of the House of Representatives
- Incumbent
- Assumed office 8 February 2026
- Preceded by: Yoshio Tezuka
- Constituency: Tokyo 5th
- In office 17 December 2012 – 9 October 2024
- Preceded by: Yoshio Tezuka
- Succeeded by: Multi-member district
- Constituency: Tokyo 5th (2012–2021); Tokyo PR (2021–2024)
- In office 12 September 2005 – 21 July 2009
- Constituency: Tokyo PR

Personal details
- Born: 2 September 1961 (age 65) Chiyoda, Tokyo, Japan
- Party: Liberal Democratic
- Education: Keio University
- Website: 若宮けんじ

Kenji Wakamiya (若宮 健嗣, Wakamiya Kenji; born 2 September 1961) is a Japanese politician of the Liberal Democratic Party, who served as a member of the House of Representatives in the Diet (national legislature). A native of Chiyoda, Tokyo and graduate of Keio University, he was elected to the House of Representatives for the first time in 2005.
