= Yoshio Tezuka =

Japanese politician

- 手塚 仁雄
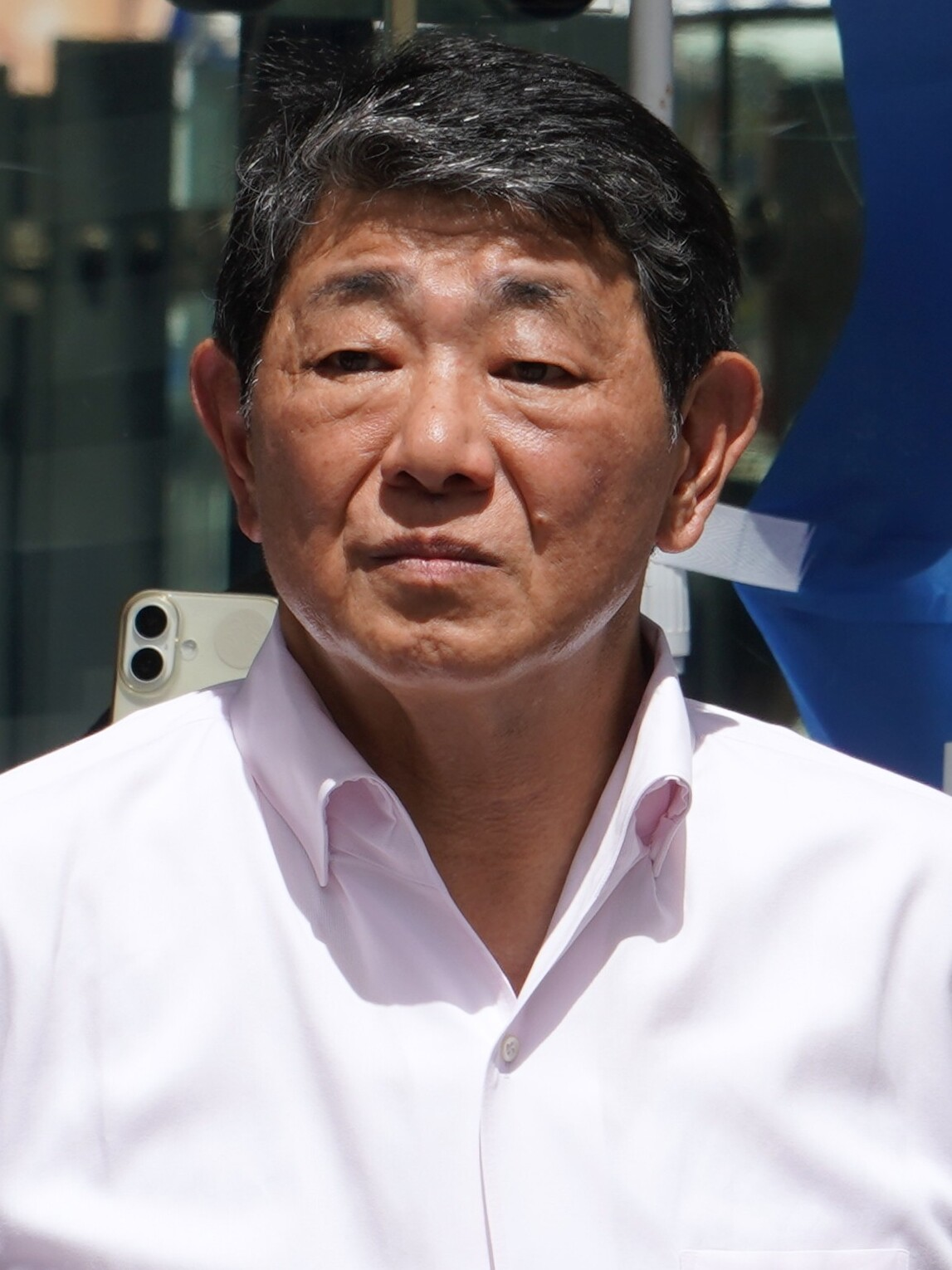
- Tezuka in 2022

Member of the House of Representatives
- In office 22 October 2017 – 23 January 2026
- Preceded by: Multi-member district
- Succeeded by: Kenji Wakamiya
- Constituency: Tokyo PR (2017–2021); Tokyo 5th (2021–2026)
- In office 30 August 2009 – 16 November 2012
- Preceded by: Takashi Kosugi
- Succeeded by: Kenji Wakamiya
- Constituency: Tokyo 5th
- In office 25 June 2000 – 8 August 2005
- Preceded by: Takashi Kosugi
- Succeeded by: Takashi Kosugi
- Constituency: Tokyo 5th

Member of the Tokyo Metropolitan Assembly
- In office 1993–1996
- Constituency: Meguro Ward

Personal details
- Born: 14 September 1966 (age 60) Meguro, Tokyo, Japan
- Party: CRA (since 2026)
- Other political affiliations: JNP (1993–1994); Independent (1994–1996); DP 1996 (1996–1998); DPJ (1998–2016); DP 2016 (2016–2017); CDP (2017–2026)
- Education: Waseda University
- Website: 衆議院議員 手塚よしお：立憲民主党 東京5区 目黒 世田谷

Yoshio Tezuka (born 14 September 1966) is a Japanese politician from the Constitutional Democratic Party who was elected to the House of Representatives in the Tokyo 5th district in the 2021 Japanese general election.
