= Miki Yamada =

Japanese politician (born 1974)

- 山田 美樹
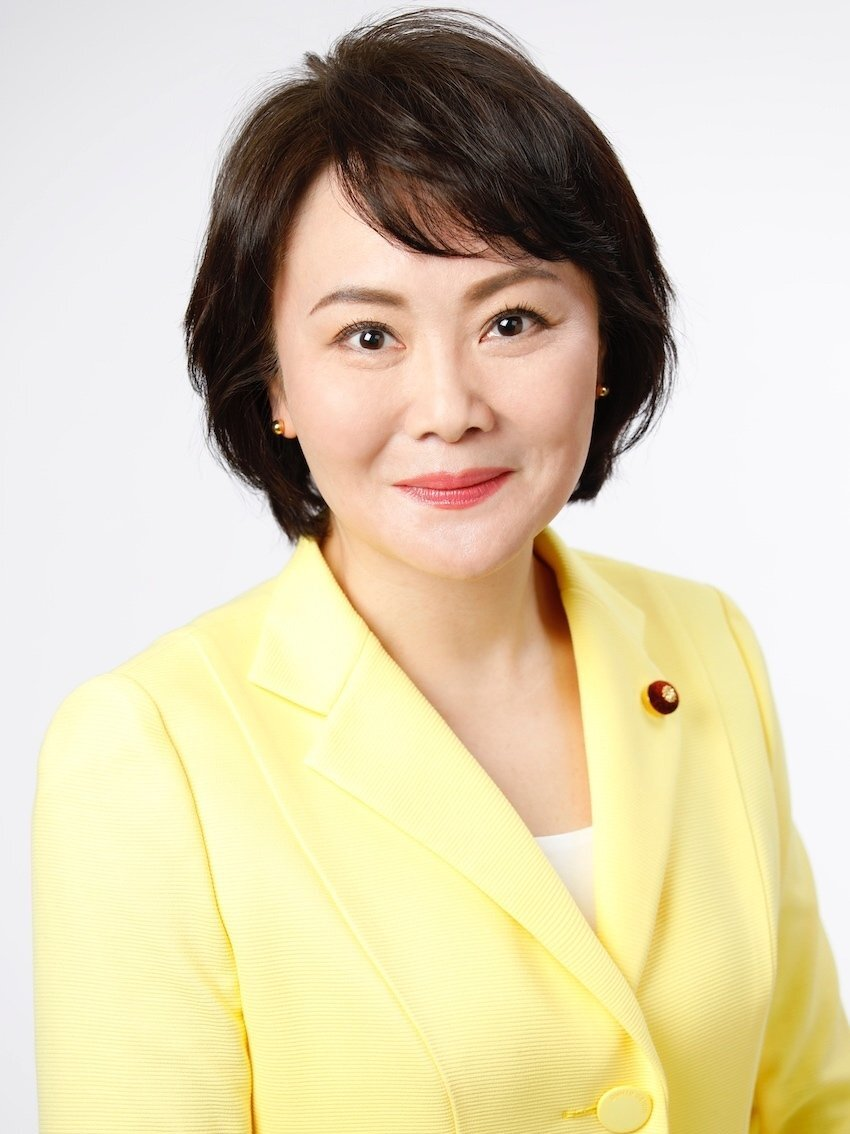
- Official portrait, 2020

Member of the House of Representatives
- Incumbent
- Assumed office 8 February 2026
- Preceded by: Banri Kaieda
- Constituency: Tokyo 1st
- In office 19 December 2012 – 9 October 2024
- Preceded by: Banri Kaieda
- Succeeded by: Banri Kaieda
- Constituency: Tokyo 1st (2012–2017); Tokyo PR (2017–2021); Tokyo 1st (2021–2024)

Personal details
- Born: 15 March 1974 (age 52) Shinagawa, Tokyo, Japan
- Party: Liberal Democratic
- Education: University of Tokyo; Columbia University

Miki Yamada (山田美樹, Yamada Miki; born 15 March 1974) is a Japanese politician and member of the House of Representatives. She is a member of the Liberal Democratic Party.

She was born in Shinagawa, Tokyo and received an LLB from the University of Tokyo, following which she joined the Ministry of International Trade and Industry. She attended business school at Columbia University and subsequently worked in the Cabinet Secretariat under Prime Minister Junichiro Koizumi, as a management consultant with Boston Consulting Group, and as a marketing executive for Hermès Japan.

She was first elected to the Diet in the 2012 general election, in which she defeated former Economy Minister (and subsequent Democratic Party of Japan president) Banri Kaieda in the Tokyo 1st district. Her campaign was supported by Kaoru Yosano.

Miki was re-elected to serve a further term in parliament in the 2014 general election. She was appointed (and remains) Vice-minister for foreign affairs in the 3rd cabinet re-shuffle of the Abe administration.

In the 2017 general election, Kaieda defeated Yamada by a small margin in the Tokyo 1st district, but Yamada retained a seat in the Diet through the LDP proportional representation list.
