= Ryōsuke Kōzuki =

Japanese politician (born 1962)

- 上月 良祐
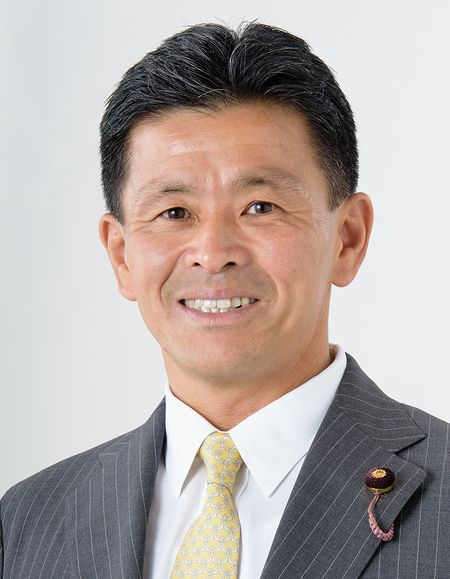
- Official portrait, 2016

Member of the House of Councillors
- Incumbent
- Assumed office 29 July 2013
- Preceded by: Tamon Hasegawa
- Constituency: Ibaraki at-large

Personal details
- Born: 26 December 1962 (age 63) Kobe, Hyōgo, Japan
- Party: Liberal Democratic
- Education: University of Tokyo

Ryōsuke Kōzuki is a Japanese politician who is a member of the House of Councillors of Japan.

== Career ==
Kōzuki graduated from the Faculty of Law at the University of Tokyo. He was first elected to the House of Councillors in 2013 and was re-elected in 2019.
