= Takumi Onuma =

Japanese politician (born 1985)

- 小沼 巧
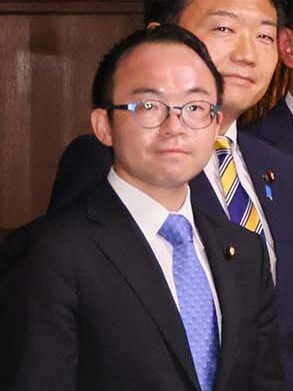
- Onuma in 2024

Member of the House of Councillors
- In office 29 July 2019 – 28 July 2025
- Preceded by: Yukihisa Fujita
- Succeeded by: Shōko Sakurai
- Constituency: Ibaraki at-large

Personal details
- Born: 21 December 1985 (age 40) Taiyō, Ibaraki, Japan
- Party: Constitutional Democratic
- Education: Waseda University

Takumi Onuma is a Japanese politician who is a former member of the House of Councillors of Japan.

== Career ==
Onuma was first elected to the House of Councillors in 2019.
