= Tamon Hasegawa =

Japanese politician

- 長谷川 大紋

Member of the House of Councillors
- In office 29 July 2007 – 28 July 2013
- Preceded by: Yasu Kanō
- Succeeded by: Ryōsuke Kōzuki
- Constituency: Ibaraki at-large

Speaker of the Ibaraki Prefectural Assembly
- In office 16 January 1991 – 15 June 1992

Member of the Ibaraki Prefectural Assembly
- In office 1974–2007
- Constituency: Nishiibaraki District

Personal details
- Born: 3 June 1943 (age 83) Kasama, Ibaraki, Japan
- Party: Liberal Democratic
- Education: Hosei University

Tamon Hasegawa (長谷川 大紋, Hasegawa Tamon; born 1943) is a Japanese politician of the Liberal Democratic Party, a member of the House of Councillors in the Diet (national legislature). He was elected to the House of Councillors for the first time in 2007 after serving in the assembly of Ibaraki Prefecture.
