= Hiroshi Okada =

Japanese politician

- 岡田 広
- Official portrait, 2013

Member of the House of Councillors
- In office 28 April 2003 – 25 July 2022
- Preceded by: Kōichi Kuno
- Succeeded by: Akiyoshi Katō
- Constituency: Ibaraki at-large

Mayor of Mito
- In office 17 October 1993 – 20 March 2003
- Preceded by: Kazunobu Sagawa
- Succeeded by: Koichi Kato

Member of the Ibaraki Prefectural Assembly
- In office 1986–1993
- Constituency: Mito City

Personal details
- Born: 31 January 1947 (age 79) Mito, Ibaraki, Japan
- Party: Liberal Democratic
- Education: Ritsumeikan University

Hiroshi Okada (岡田 広, Okada Hiroshi; born 31 January 1947) is a Japanese politician of the Liberal Democratic Party (LDP), a former member of the House of Councillors in the Diet (national legislature) affiliated to the revisionist lobby Nippon Kaigi.

A native of Mito, Ibaraki and graduate of Ritsumeikan University, Okada had served in the assembly of Ibaraki Prefecture since 1986 and as mayor of Mito for three terms since 1993. In 2003 he was elected to the House of Councillors for the first time. He also held the following political positions: State Minister of Cabinet Office; State Minister for Reconstruction; Parliamentary Vice-Minister of Health, Labour and Welfare; Chief Director, Committee on Financial Affairs, HC; Chairperson, Committee on Cabinet, HC; and Director, Cabinet Division, LDP.
