= Akira Gunji =

Japanese politician

- 郡司 彰
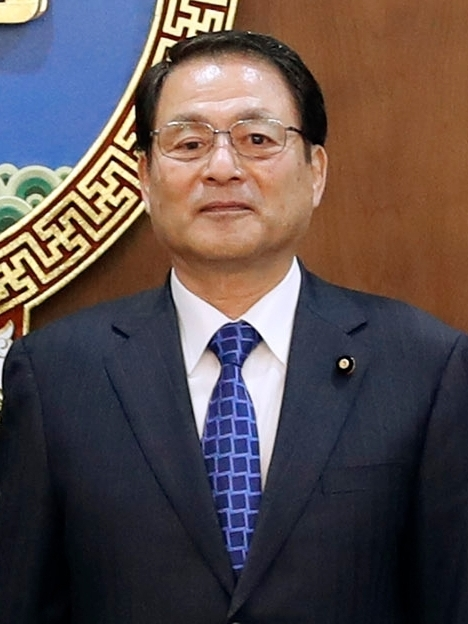
- Gunji in 2018

Vice President of the House of Councillors of Japan
- In office 1 August 2016 – 1 August 2019
- President: Chuichi Date
- Preceded by: Azuma Koshiishi
- Succeeded by: Toshio Ogawa

Minister of Agriculture, Forestry and Fisheries
- In office 4 June 2012 – 26 December 2012
- Prime Minister: Yoshihiko Noda
- Preceded by: Michihiko Kano
- Succeeded by: Yoshimasa Hayashi

Member of the House of Councillors
- In office 26 July 1998 – 25 July 2022
- Preceded by: Osamu Yatabe
- Succeeded by: Masako Dogomi
- Constituency: Ibaraki at-large

Personal details
- Born: 11 December 1949 (age 76) Mito, Ibaraki, Japan
- Party: CDP (since 2020)
- Other political affiliations: DPJ (1998–2016); DP (2016–2018); Independent (2018–2020)
- Education: Ritsu-Takahagi High School; Meiji Gakuin University (dropped out)

Akira Gunji (郡司 彰, Gunji Akira; born 11 December 1949) is a Japanese politician of the Constitutional Democratic Party of Japan and formerly a member of the House of Councillors in the Diet (national legislature). He served as Vice President of the House of Councillors from 2016 to 2019.

== Career ==
A native of Mito, Ibaraki and dropout of Meiji Gakuin University, he was elected to the House of Councillors for the first time in 1998.
