= Banri Kaieda =

Japanese politician (born 1949)

- 海江田 万里
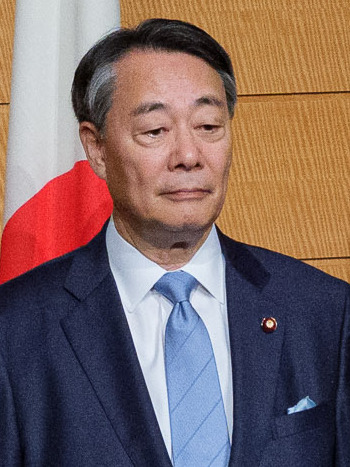
- Kaieda in 2023

Vice Speaker of the House of Representatives
- In office 10 November 2021 – 9 October 2024
- Speaker: Hiroyuki Hosoda; Fukushiro Nukaga
- Preceded by: Hirotaka Akamatsu
- Succeeded by: Kōichirō Genba

President of the Democratic Party of Japan
- In office 25 December 2012 – 14 December 2014
- Preceded by: Yoshihiko Noda
- Succeeded by: Katsuya Okada

Ministry of Economy, Trade and Industry
- In office 14 January 2011 – 2 September 2011
- Prime Minister: Naoto Kan
- Preceded by: Akihiro Ohata
- Succeeded by: Yoshio Hachiro

Member of the House of Representatives
- In office 23 October 2017 – 23 January 2026
- Preceded by: Miki Yamada
- Succeeded by: Miki Yamada
- Constituency: Tokyo 1st (2017–2021); Tokyo PR (2021–2024); Tokyo 1st (2024–2026)
- In office 30 August 2009 – 21 November 2014
- Preceded by: Kaoru Yosano
- Succeeded by: Akihisa Nagashima
- Constituency: Tokyo 1st (2009–2012); Tokyo PR (2012–2014)
- In office 19 July 1993 – 8 August 2005
- Preceded by: Kikuko Suzuki
- Succeeded by: Kaoru Yosano
- Constituency: Tokyo 1st (1993–1996); Tokyo PR (1996–2000); Tokyo 1st (2000–2005)

Personal details
- Born: 26 February 1949 (age 77) Suginami, Tokyo, Japan
- Party: CRA (since 2026)
- Other political affiliations: JNP (1992–1994); DP 1996 (1996–1998); DPJ (1998–2016); DP 2016 (2016–2017); CDP (2017–2026)
- Education: Keio University
- Website: Official website

Banri Kaieda (海江田 万里, Kaieda Banri; born 26 February 1949) is a Japanese politician who served as the Vice Speaker of the House of Representatives of Japan from 2021 to 2024. A member of the House of Representatives of Japan, he also served as the President of the Democratic Party of Japan between 2012 and 2014. He is a former minister in the Kan cabinet.

== Early life ==
Kaieda was born and grew up in Suginami, Tokyo. He is named after the Great Wall of China (万里の長城, Banri no Chōjō) as his father was a newspaper correspondent who covered China and Taiwan. He graduated from Keio University where he studied political science, English, German and Chinese. He became known as a television personality in the late 1980s and early 1990s, both in comical roles and as a serious newscaster (hosting the Saturday evening news program on TV Tokyo from 1989 to 1991).

== Political career ==
Kaieda worked as an economic analyst and secretary to a member of the House of Councillors before winning election to the House of Representatives in the 1993 general election. He was originally a member of the Japan New Party, then formed a short-lived party following the JNP's collapse, and was one of the founding members of the Democratic Party of Japan in 1996. He retained a seat in the Tokyo proportional representation block in the 1996 general election, losing his Tokyo 1st district seat to Kaoru Yosano of the LDP. He regained his district seat in the 2000 election and 2003 election, but was forced out of the House of Representatives in the 2005 election, both losing his district seat to Yosano and failing to win a PR seat.

=== DPJ government ===
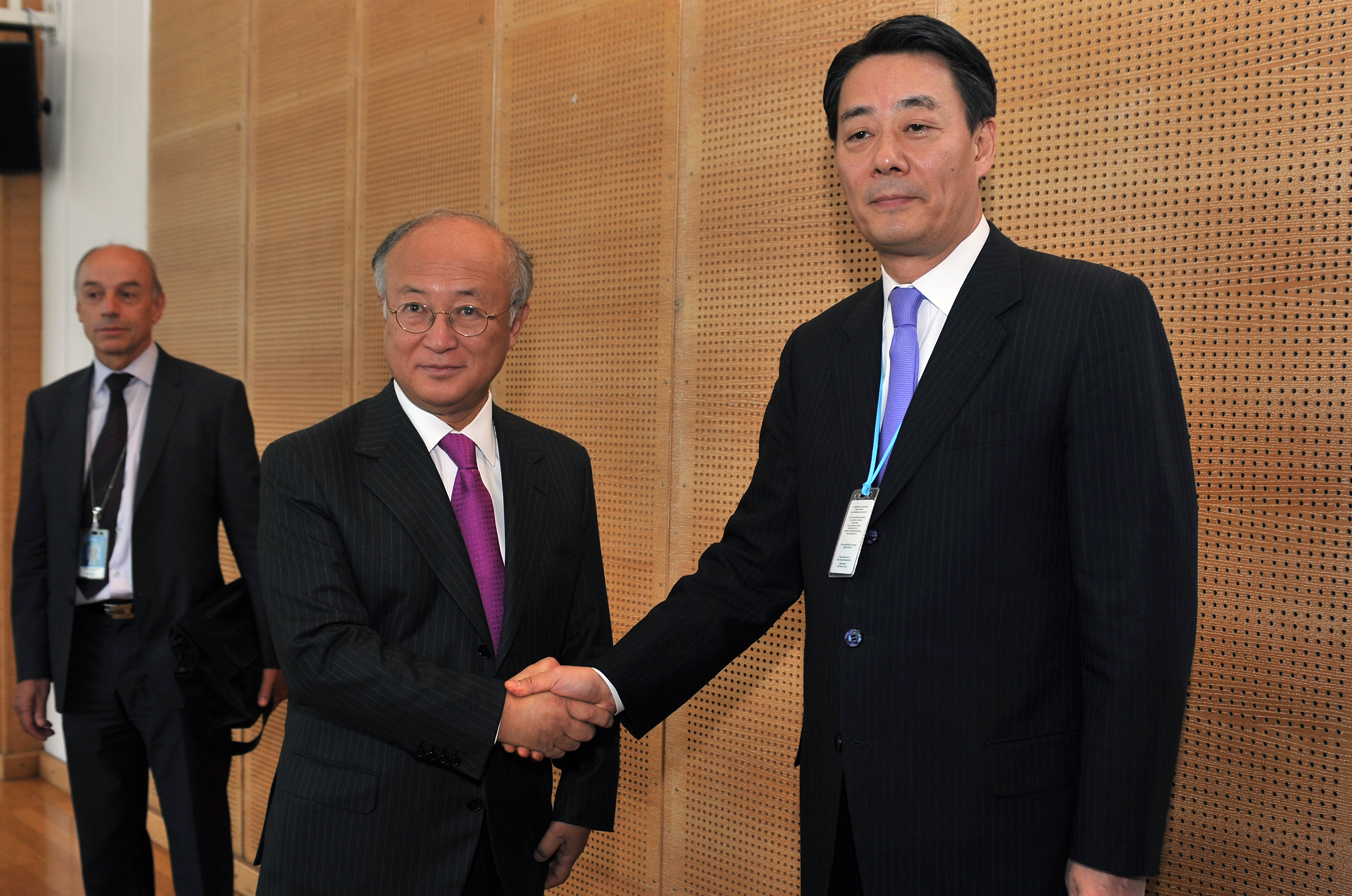
Kaieda with Yukiya Amano (left) (20 June 2011)

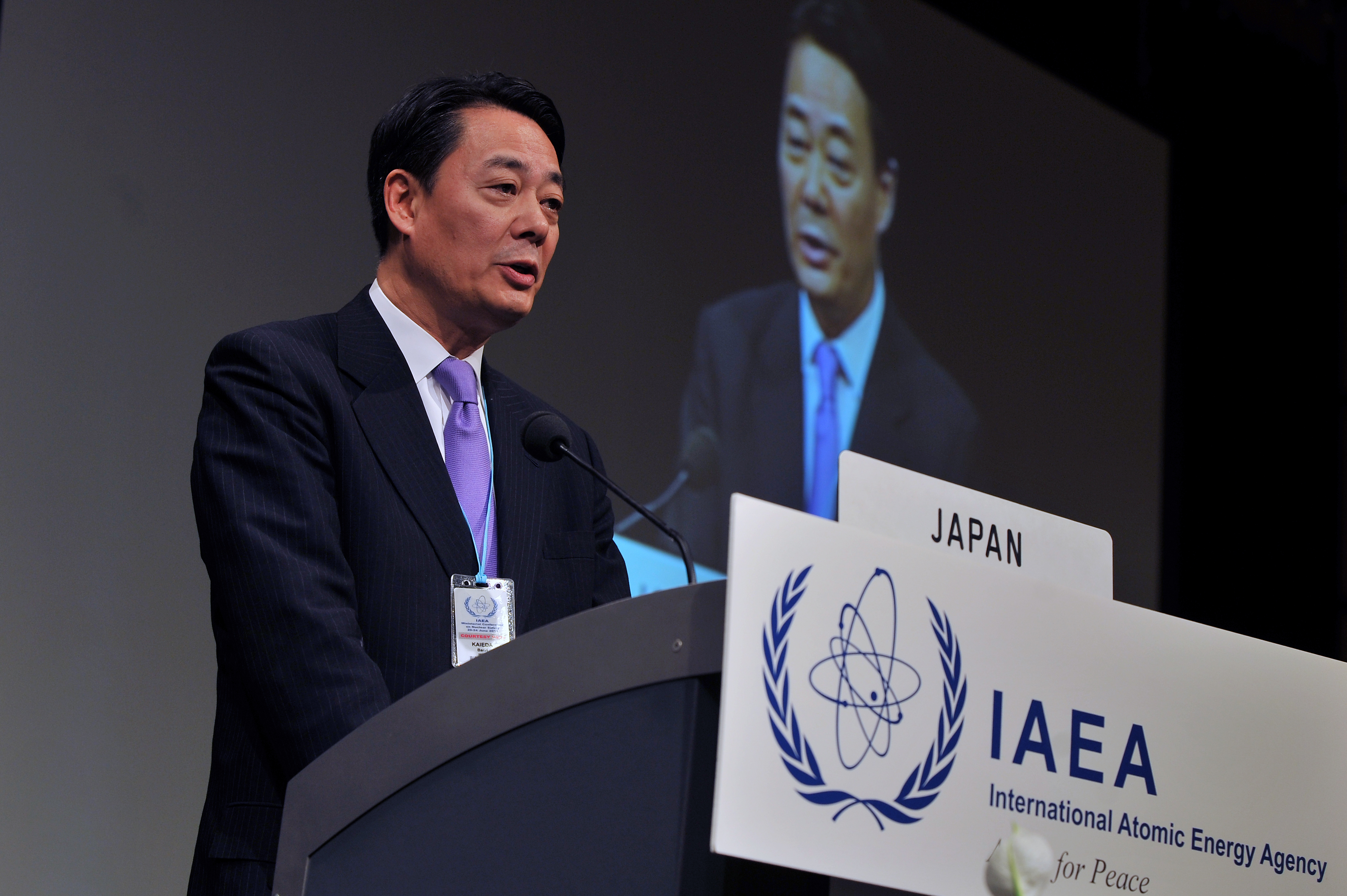
Kaieda at the opening of the Ministerial Conference on Nuclear Safety (20 June 2011)

Kaieda re-won the Tokyo 1st district seat in the 2009 general election, following which the DPJ was able to form a government.

Kaieda was tapped to serve as Minister of State for Economic and Fiscal Policy from September 2010, in which role he encouraged the Bank of Japan to purchase foreign currency assets in order to stop a sharp appreciation in the value of the Japanese yen.

In January 2011, he was appointed to head the Ministry of Economy, Trade and Industry by Prime Minister Naoto Kan. The Fukushima disaster in March 2011 made evident numerous missteps within the ministry, and Kaieda stepped down as economy minister in August in order to take responsibility. He had been under intense pressure to resign from the Liberal Democratic Party, and was brought to tears on the Diet floor following 20 minutes of berating from LDP legislator Ryosei Akazawa days earlier.

After Kan resigned in August 2011, Kaieda competed to replace him, supported by former DPJ leader Ichirō Ozawa, then under suspension from the party after being indicted for alleged violation of the Political Funds Act. Kaieda lost a runoff vote against Yoshihiko Noda, achieving 177 votes to Noda's 215.

In the 2012 election, the DPJ under Noda suffered a major defeat. Kaieda lost his seat representing the Tokyo 1st district to LDP newcomer Miki Yamada but retained a Diet seat through proportional representation.

=== Opposition leader ===
Noda resigned as president of the DPJ to accept responsibility for its defeat in the 2012 election. The resulting DPJ presidential election was held on 25 December 2012, which was contested by Kaieda and Sumio Mabuchi. It was eventually won by Kaieda with 90 votes to Mabuchi's 54 votes. It was suggested that his rise to the leadership could lead to cooperation with Ozawa, who had left the DPJ during 2012 due to Noda's pushing through of a consumption tax increase.

After the 2013 House of Councillors election, in which the DPJ suffered another defeat, Kaieda reportedly approached Naoto Kan and asked him to leave the party after he defied party policy by endorsing a non-DPJ candidate.

Despite the DPJ recovering a few seats in the 2014 snap election, Kaieda lost his district seat. He resigned as leader of the DPJ and Katsuya Okada succeeded him as president of the DPJ.

=== Constitutional Democratic Party ===
Kaieda joined the newly formed Constitutional Democratic Party of Japan in 2017, following the breakup of the Democratic Party. He re-won the Tokyo 1st district seat in the 2017 general election after a closely contested race with Miki Yamada. After being defeated in the 2021 general election and being saved by a PR seat, he was reelected in the 2024 general election.

== Views ==
According to a Gay Japan News 2009 election questionnaire, he supported legalization of gay marriage in Japan and indicated a desire to put support for gay rights into the Democratic Party of Japan's party platform.

Political offices
Preceded by Akihiro Ohata	Ministry of Economy, Trade and Industry; 2011	Succeeded by Yoshio Hachiro
Preceded by Satoshi Arai	Minister of State for Economic and Fiscal Policy; 2010–2011	Succeeded by Kaoru Yosano
Preceded by Tatsuo Kawabata	Minister of State for Science and Technology Policy; 2010–2011	Succeeded by Kōichirō Genba
Party political offices
Preceded by Yoshihiko Noda	President of the Democratic Party; 2012–2014	Succeeded by Katsuya Okada
Preceded by Katsuya Okada	Chairman of the Policy Research Council, Democratic Party; 2002	Succeeded by Yukio Edano
