= Mitsuo Matayoshi =

Japanese political activist (1944–2018)

- 又吉 光雄
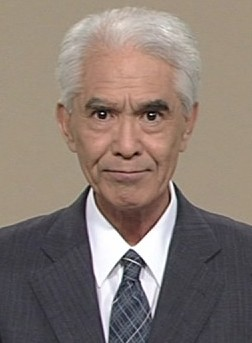
- Matayoshi in 2010

Chairman of the World Economic Community Party
- In office 1997 – 30 June 2018
- Preceded by: Position established
- Succeeded by: Position abolished

Personal details
- Born: 5 February 1944 Ginowan, Okinawa, Japan
- Died: 20 July 2018 (aged 74) Tokyo, Japan
- Party: World Economic Community Party
- Education: Chuo University

Mitsuo Matayoshi (又吉 光雄, Matayoshi Mitsuo; February 5, 1944 – July 20, 2018), also known as Jesus Matayoshi (又吉 イエス, Matayoshi Iesu) or The Only God Matayoshi Jesus Christ (唯一神又吉光雄・イエス・キリスト, Yui'itsu-shin Matayoshi Mitsuo Iesu Kirisuto), was a Japanese political activist and perennial candidate. He was the leader and founder of the World Economic Community Party (Sekai Keizai Kyōdōtai-tō (世界経済共同体党)).

He was born in Ginowan, Okinawa on February 5, 1944. After graduating from Chuo University in Tokyo in 1968, he moved back to Okinawa and ran a juku, a private school. Matayoshi was trained as a Protestant preacher, and through his religious studies developed a particular concept of Christianity strongly influenced by eschatology. In 1997, he established the World Economic Community Party, a political party based on his conviction that he was God. His concept was both religious and political, a mix of Christian eschatology like Augustine's De civitate Dei ("City of God") and conservative collectivism. He died from kidney cancer on 20 July 2018 in Tokyo, aged 74.

== Political program ==
According to his programme he would have carried out the Last Judgment as Christ, but within the current political system. His first step was to have been appointed the Prime Minister of Japan. Then he would have reformed Japanese society and be offered the post of the Secretary-General of the United Nations. Matayoshi would then have reigned over the whole world with two legitimate authorities, not only religious but also political. The world economic system would have been altered to encourage every nation to be self-sufficient, based on agriculture. He condemned permanent residency and the naturalisation of foreigners because he viewed the abandonment of one's motherland to be wrong. He wanted ethnically non-Japanese people to go back to their ancestral homeland even if they were born in Japan. He wanted the US to withdraw its army from all overseas positions, including Okinawa. After his Judgment he would have thrown the corrupt into the Fire (see Book of Revelation).

== Elections ==
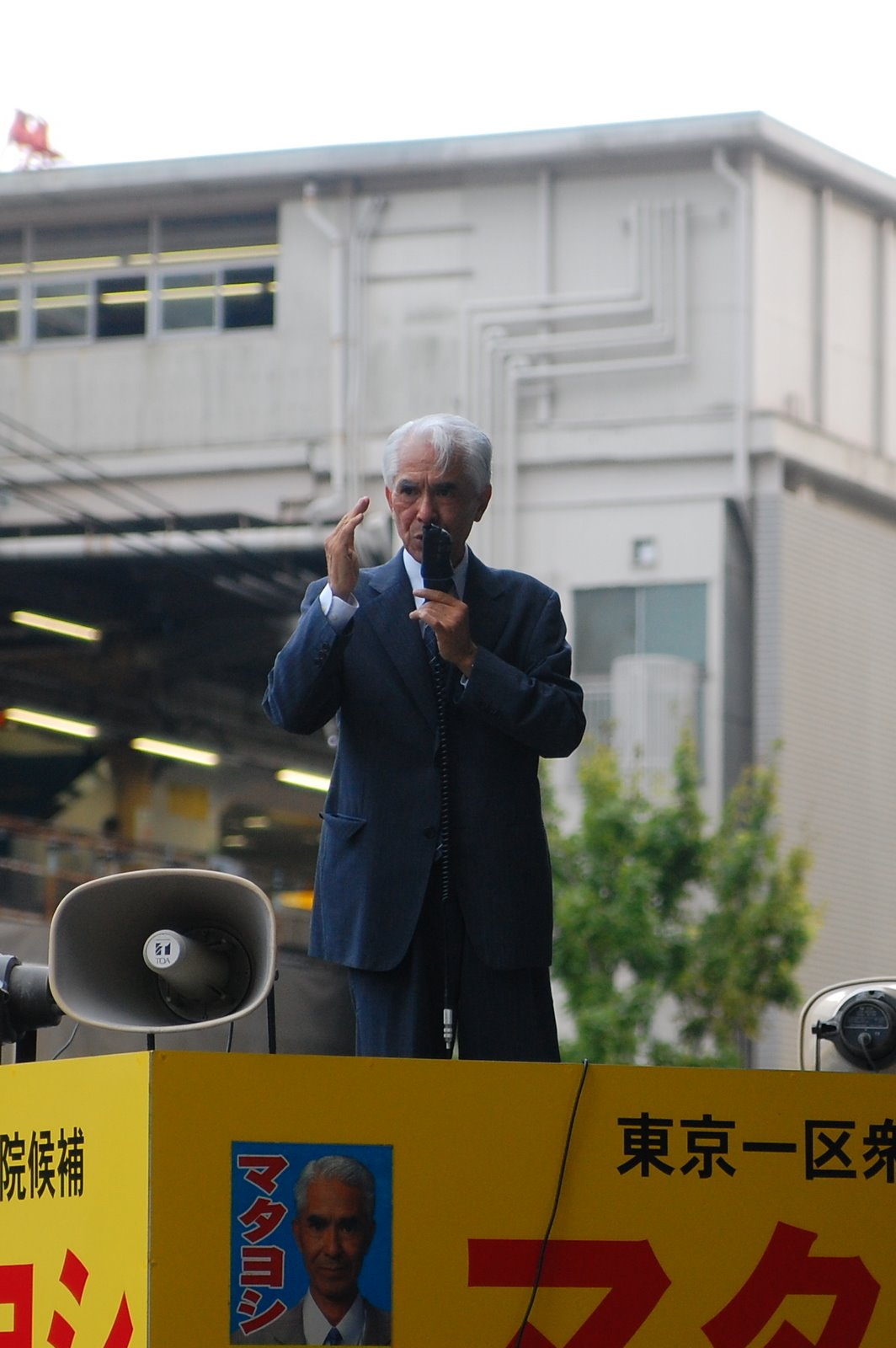
Matayoshi campaigning in Tokyo, 2009

Matayoshi presented himself as a candidate in many elections from 1997 through to 2013, despite winning none of them. He became well known for his eccentric campaigns in which he urged opponents to commit suicide by hara-kiri (disembowelment; note that he avoided the more polite seppuku) and said that he will cast them into Gehenna. Like most Japanese politicians, he campaigned in a single small regulation size mini-van fitted with oversized loudspeakers. Unlike most, however, he blasted his campaign slogans in a stylised, kabuki-inspired voice.

=== Unsuccessful candidacies ===
- Mayor of Ginowan election (1997)
- 1998 Japanese House of Councillors election (Okinawa at-large district)
- Governor of Okinawa Prefecture election (1998)
- Mayor of Ginowan election (2001)
- Mayor of Nago election (2002)
- Governor of Okinawa Prefecture election (2002)
- 2003 Japanese general election (Tokyo 1st district)
- 2004 Japanese House of Councillors election (Tokyo at-large district)
- 2005 Japanese general election (Tokyo 1st district)
- 2007 Japanese House of Councillors election (Tokyo at-large district)
- 2009 Japanese general election (Tokyo 1st district)
- 2010 Japanese House of Councillors election (Tokyo at-large district)
- 2013 Japanese House of Councillors election (Tokyo at-large district)
- 2014 Japanese general election (Tokyo 1st district)
- 2016 Japanese House of Councillors election (Tokyo at-large district)
- 2017 Japanese general election (Tokyo 1st district)

== See also ==
- God complex
- List of people claimed to be Jesus
- List of messiah claimants
