= Shoko Sakurai =

Japanese politician (born 1984)

- 櫻井 祥子

Member of the House of Councillors
- Incumbent
- Assumed office 29 July 2025
- Preceded by: Takumi Onuma
- Constituency: Ibaraki at-large

Personal details
- Born: 31 January 1984 (age 42) Ōta, Tokyo, Japan
- Party: Sanseitō
- Education: Tohoku University

Shoko Sakurai (櫻井 祥子, Sakurai Shōko; born 31 January 1984) is a Japanese politician serving as a member of the House of Councillors since 2025. In the 2024 general election, she was a candidate for the House of Representatives in Tokyo 1st district.
