= Tokyo 1st district =

Japan House of Representatives constituency

Tokyo 1st District
- Parliamentary constituency for the Japanese House of Representatives
- Numbered map of inner Tokyo single-member districts
- Prefecture: Tokyo
- Proportional District: Tokyo
- Electorate: 329,429 (2026)

Current constituency
- Created: 1994
- Seats: One
- Party: LDP
- Representative: Miki Yamada
- Created from: Tokyo 1st district
- Wards: Chiyoda, Shinjuku

Tokyo 1st district (東京都第1区, Tōkyō-to dai-ikku or 東京1区, Tōkyō ikku) is a constituency of the House of Representatives in the Diet of Japan (national legislature). It is located in eastern mainland Tokyo and covers central parts of the former city of Tokyo. The district consists of the wards of Chiyoda (which includes the central government buildings) and Shinjuku. As of 2016, 514,974 eligible voters were registered in the district. Before redistricting in 2022, the district included a part of Minato ward which is now in the 7th district.

Before the electoral reform of 1994, the area had been part of Tokyo 1st district where three Representatives had been elected by single non-transferable vote.

The two main candidates contesting the district until 2009, Banri Kaieda (DPJ, Hatoyama group) and Kaoru Yosano (formerly LDP, without faction), had represented the old multi-member 1st district of Tokyo. In 2012, Yosano retired, and LDP newcomer Miki Yamada narrowly beat Kaieda, who was re-elected to a proportional seat leading the Democratic list in Tokyo with a sekihairitsu of 98.6%. Kaieda regained the seat in the 2017 election. The seat has been alternately won by Kaieda and Yamada since then.

== List of representatives ==
Representative	Party	Dates	Notes
Kaoru Yosano	LDP	1996–2000	Lost. Failed re-election in the Tokyo PR block
Banri Kaieda	DPJ	2000–2005	Lost. Failed re-election in the Tokyo block
Kaoru Yosano	LDP	2005–2009	Lost. Re-elected in the Tokyo block
Banri Kaieda	DPJ	2009–2012	Lost. Re-elected in the Tokyo block
Miki Yamada	LDP	2012–2017	Lost. Re-elected in the Tokyo block
Banri Kaieda	CDP	2017–2021	Lost. Re-elected in the Tokyo block
Miki Yamada	LDP	2021–2024	
Banri Kaieda	CDP	2024–2026	
Miki Yamada	LDP	2026–	

== Election results ==
2026
Party	Candidate	Votes	%	±%
LDP	Miki Yamada	82,622	43.00	▲12.08
Centrist Reform	Banri Kaieda	48,830	25.41	▼5.51
Sanseitō	Rina Yoshikawa (elected by PR)	25,232	13.13	▲7.15
Ishin	Asuka Haruyama	20,187	10.50	▼5.79
JCP	Asahi Kuroda	15,295	7.96	▲1.28
Turnout			59.52	▲3.98
LDP gain from Centrist Reform				

2024
Party	Candidate	Votes	%	±%
CDP	Banri Kaieda	56,979	32.01	▼3.42
LDP	Miki Yamada	55,040	30.92	▼8.09
Ishin	Shun Otokita	29,002	16.29	▼7.41
Independent	Saori Satō	12,255	6.88	New
JCP	Ken Nakano	11,889	6.68	New
Sanseitō	Shōko Sakurai	10,636	5.98	New
Anti-NHK	Hiroshi Takaki	951	0.53	New
Independent	Hiroshi Arakaki	716	0.40	New
Minor party	Nobuo Shindō	530	0.30	New
Turnout			55.60	▼0.67
CDP gain from LDP		Swing	▲2.34	

2021
Party	Candidate	Votes	%	±%
LDP (Komeito)	Miki Yamada	99,133	39.01	▼0.4
CDP	Banri Kaieda (elected by PR)	90,043	35.43	▼5.3
Ishin	Taisuke Ono (elected by PR)	60,230	23.70	
Independent	Hisae Naitō	4,715	1.86	
Turnout			56.27	▲2.23
LDP gain from CDP		Swing	▲2.5	

2017
Party	Candidate	Votes	%	±%
Constitutional Democratic (JCP, SDP)	Banri Kaieda	96,255	40.7	▲5.1
LDP (Komeito)	Miki Yamada (elected by PR)	93,234	39.4	▼3.3
Kibō no Tō	Kaoru Matsuzawa	40,376	17.1	New
Happiness Realization	Miki Haraguchi	3,806	1.6	New
Shōko Inumaru & Republican Party	Mitsuka Inumaru	1,570	0.7	New
WECP	Mitsuo Matayoshi	1,307	0.6	+0.0
Turnout			54.04	▲1.00
CDP gain from LDP		Swing	+4.4	

2014
Party	Candidate	Votes	%	±%
LDP (Kōmeitō)	Miki Yamada	107,015	42.7	+13.4
Democratic	Banri Kaieda	89,232	35.6	+6.7
JCP	Naoki Tomita	32,830	13.1	+6.4
Future Generations	Tōru Watanabe	18,128	7.2	new
Independent	Takanobu Nosaka	2,209	0.9	new
WECP	Mitsuo Matayoshi	1,416	0.6	+0.2

2012
Party	Candidate	Votes	%	±%
LDP (Kōmeitō)	Miki Yamada	82,013	29.3	
Democratic (People's New)	Banri Kaieda (elected by PR)	80,879	28.9	
Restoration	Yoshitaka Katō	48,083	17.2	
Your	Tarō Kosai	31,554	11.3	
JCP	Naoki Tomita	18,763	6.7	
Tomorrow (NP-Daichi)	Tetsuo Nozawa	14,875	5.3	
Happiness Realization	Nozomi Itō	1,999	0.7	
WECP	Mitsuo Matayoshi	1,011	0.4	
Independent	Noriaki Kameyama	614	0.2	

2009
Party	Candidate	Votes	%	±%
Democratic (People's New)	Banri Kaieda	141,742		
LDP (Kōmeitō)	Kaoru Yosano (elected by PR)	130,030		
JCP	Naoki Tomita	19,288		
Happiness Realization	Junko Tanaka	2,718		
Independent	Tetsuo Nozawa	1,418		
Independent	Takekuni Kurosawa	1,300		
Smile	Mac Akasaka (Makoto Tonami)	987		
WECP	Jesus Matayoshi (Mitsuo Matayoshi)	718		
Independent	Yoshinobu Maeda	652		
Turnout		303,595	65.58	

2005
Party	Candidate	Votes	%	±%
LDP	Kaoru Yosano	149,894		
Democratic	Banri Kaieda	101,396		
JCP	Yasunobu Horie	21,794		
WECP	Mitsuo Matayoshi	1,557		
Turnout		278,974	65.25	

2003
Party	Candidate	Votes	%	±%
Democratic	Banri Kaieda	105,222		
LDP	Kaoru Yosano (elected by PR)	103,785		
JCP	Fuminori Satō	20,640		
Independent	Makiko Hamada	5,572		
WECP	Mitsuo Matayoshi	698		
Turnout		241,201	58.32	

2000
Party	Candidate	Votes	%	±%
Democratic	Banri Kaieda	93,173		
LDP	Kaoru Yosano	90,540		
JCP	Junko Ōtsuka	36,525		
Liberal League	Yūsaku Hino	3,118		
Independent	Jin Marukawa	2,492		

1996
Party	Candidate	Votes	%	±%
LDP	Kaoru Yosano	82,098		
Democratic	Banri Kaieda (elected by PR)	63,661		
JCP	Junko Ōtsuka	36,308		
New Frontier	Taizō Shibano	27,424		
Turnout		215,312	55.99	

== See also ==
- Tokyo 1st district (1947–1993)
- Tokyo 1st district (1946)
- Tokyo 1st district (1928-1942)
- Tokyo 1st district (1890-1898)
