= Osamu Yatabe =

Japanese lawyer and politician (1932–2021)

- 矢田部 理

Chairman of the New Socialist Party
- In office 1996–2002
- Preceded by: Position established
- Succeeded by: Tatsukuni Komori

Member of the House of Councillors
- In office 8 July 1974 – 25 July 1998
- Preceded by: Motojirō Mori
- Succeeded by: Akira Gunji
- Constituency: Ibaraki at-large

Personal details
- Born: 15 February 1932 Daigo, Ibaraki, Japan
- Died: 5 December 2021 (aged 89) Mito, Ibaraki, Japan
- Party: New Socialist
- Other political affiliations: Socialist (1974–1996)
- Education: Chuo University
- Occupation: Lawyer

Osamu Yatabe (Japanese: 矢田部理 Yatabe Osamu; 15 February 1932 – 5 December 2021) was a Japanese lawyer and politician. A member of the Japan Socialist Party and later the New Socialist Party of Japan, he served in the House of Councillors from 1974 to 1998.
