= Ibaraki at-large district =

Japan House of Councillors constituency

- 茨城県選挙区
- Parliamentary constituency for the House of Councillors
- Prefecture: Ibaraki
- Electorate: 2,362,192

Current constituency
- Created: 1947
- Seats: 4
- Councillors: Class of 2028: Akiyoshi Katō (LDP); Makiko Dōgomi (DPFP); Class of 2031: Ryōsuke Kōzuki (LDP); Shoko Sakurai (Sanseitō)

The Ibaraki at-large district (Japanese: 茨城県選挙区, Hepburn: Ibaraki-ken senkyoku) is a constituency that represents Ibaraki Prefecture in the House of Councillors in the Diet of Japan. It has four Councillors in the 248-member house.

== Outline ==
The constituency represents the entire population of Ibaraki Prefecture. The district elects four Councillors to six-year terms, two each at alternating elections held every three years. The district has 2,362,192 registered voters as of July 2025. The Councillors currently representing Ibaraki are:

- Akiyoshi Katō (Liberal Democratic Party (LDP), first term; term ends in 2028)
- Makiko Dōgomi (Democratic Party For the People (DPFP), first term; term ends in 2028)
- Ryōsuke Kōzuki (LDP, third term; term ends in 2031)
- Shoko Sakurai (Sanseitō, first term; term ends in 2031)

== Elected Councillors ==
Class of 1947		Election year	Class of 1950 (3-year term in 1947)	
Yasuji Yūki (Ind.) (Note: Later joined Ryokufūkai)	Masaji Shibata (Liberal) (Note: Died in office 15 September 1950)	1947	Nobuo Ōhata (Social Democratic)	Tsuneo Ikeda (Ind.) (Note: Later joined the Labourers and Farmers Party)
Yasuji Yūki (Ind.)	Masaji Shibata (Liberal)	1950	Yūichi Kōri (Liberal)	Shichihei Kikuta (National Democratic)
Yasuji Yūki (Ind.)	Shigefumi Miyata (Liberal)	1950 by-election (Note: Held 3 November 1950)	Yūichi Kōri (Liberal)	Shichihei Kikuta (National Democratic)
Tsunesuke Mutō (Kaishintō)	Shigefumi Miyata (Liberal)	1953	Yūichi Kōri (Liberal)	Shichihei Kikuta (National Democratic)
Tsunesuke Mutō (Kaishintō)	Shigefumi Miyata (Liberal)	1956	Yūichi Kōri (LDP)	Motojiro Mori (Social Democratic)
Tsunesuke Mutō (Note: Died in office 6 August 1963) (LDP)	Sōzō Ōmori (Social Democratic)	1959	Yūichi Kōri (LDP)	Motojiro Mori (Social Democratic)
Tsunesuke Mutō (LDP)	Sōzō Ōmori (Social Democratic)	1962	Yūichi Kōri (LDP)	Motojiro Mori (Social Democratic)
Ichiji Suzuki (LDP)	Sōzō Ōmori (Social Democratic)	1963 by-election (Note: Held 18 September 1963)	Yūichi Kōri (LDP)	Motojiro Mori (Social Democratic)
Kishirō Nakamura (Note: Died in office 21 December 1971) (LDP)	Sōzō Ōmori (Social Democratic)	1965	Yūichi Kōri (LDP)	Motojiro Mori (Social Democratic)
Kishirō Nakamura (LDP)	Sōzō Ōmori (Social Democratic)	1968	Yūichi Kōri (LDP)	Motojiro Mori (Social Democratic)
Kishirō Nakamura (LDP)	Fujio Takeuchi (Note: Resigned 14 March 1975) (LDP)	1971	Yūichi Kōri (LDP)	Motojiro Mori (Social Democratic)
Tomi Nakamura (Minor party) (Note: Wife of the deceased Kishirō Nakamura. Ran as a candidate of a minor party, but later joined the LDP)	Fujio Takeuchi (LDP)	1972 by-election (Note: Held 6 February 1972)	Yūichi Kōri (LDP)	Motojiro Mori (Social Democratic)
Tomi Nakamura (Minor party)	Fujio Takeuchi (LDP)	1974	Taeko Iwakami (Note: Resigned 21 December 1977) (Minor party) (Note: Elected as a candidate for the Ibaraki Agricultural Federation. Later joined the LDP)	Osamu Yatabe (Social Democratic)
Tomi Nakamura (Minor party)	Yūichi Kōri (LDP)	1975 by-election (Note: Held 27 April 1975)	Taeko Iwakami (Minor party)	Osamu Yatabe (Social Democratic)
Michitada Takasugi (Social Democratic)	Yūichi Kōri (LDP)	1977	Taeko Iwakami (Minor party)	Osamu Yatabe (Social Democratic)
Michitada Takasugi (Social Democratic)	Yūichi Kōri (LDP)	(Note: Held 5 February 1978)1978 by-election	Nirō Iwakami (Note: Husband of Taeko Iwakami. Died in office 16 August 1989) (LDP)	Osamu Yatabe (Social Democratic)
Michitada Takasugi (Social Democratic)	Yūichi Kōri (LDP)	1980	Nirō Iwakami (LDP)	Osamu Yatabe (Social Democratic)
Michitada Takasugi (Social Democratic)	Ikuo Soneda (LDP)	1983	Nirō Iwakami (LDP)	Osamu Yatabe (Social Democratic)
Michitada Takasugi (Social Democratic)	Ikuo Soneda (LDP)	1986	Nirō Iwakami (LDP)	Osamu Yatabe (Social Democratic)
Makoto Taneda (Social Democratic)	Akio Kanō (Note: Died in office 26 February 1992) (LDP)	1989	Nirō Iwakami (LDP)	Osamu Yatabe (Social Democratic)
Makoto Taneda (Social Democratic)	Akio Kanō (LDP)	(Note: Held 1 October 1989)1989 by-election	Itsuo Nomura (LDP)	Osamu Yatabe (Social Democratic)
Makoto Taneda (Social Democratic)	Yasu Kanō (Note: Wife of Akio Kanō) (LDP)	1992 by-election (Note: Held 12 April 1992)	Itsuo Nomura (LDP)	Osamu Yatabe (Social Democratic)
Makoto Taneda (Social Democratic)	Yasu Kanō (LDP)	1992	Itsuo Nomura (LDP)	Osamu Yatabe (Social Democratic)
Moto Kobayashi (New Frontier)	Yasu Kanō (LDP)	1995	Itsuo Nomura (LDP)	Osamu Yatabe (Social Democratic)
Moto Kobayashi (New Frontier)	Yasu Kanō (LDP)	1998	Kōichi Kuno (Note: Died in office 17 October 2002) (LDP)	Akira Gunji (DPJ)
Moto Kobayashi (DPJ)	Yasu Kanō (LDP)	2001	Kōichi Kuno (LDP)	Akira Gunji (DPJ)
Moto Kobayashi (DPJ)	Yasu Kanō (LDP)	2003 by-election (Note: Held 27 April 2003)	Hiroshi Okada (LDP)	Akira Gunji (DPJ)
Moto Kobayashi (DPJ)	Yasu Kanō (LDP)	2004	Hiroshi Okada (LDP)	Akira Gunji (DPJ)
Yukihisa Fujita (DPJ)	Tamon Hasegawa (LDP)	2007	Hiroshi Okada (LDP)	Akira Gunji (DPJ)
Yukihisa Fujita (DPJ)	Tamon Hasegawa (LDP)	2010	Hiroshi Okada (LDP)	Akira Gunji (DPJ)
Yukihisa Fujita (DPJ)	Ryōsuke Kōzuki (LDP)	2013	Hiroshi Okada (LDP)	Akira Gunji (DPJ)
Yukihisa Fujita (DPJ)	Ryōsuke Kōzuki (LDP)	2016	Hiroshi Okada (LDP)	Akira Gunji (DP)
Takumi Onuma (CDP)	Ryōsuke Kōzuki (LDP)	2019	Hiroshi Okada (LDP)	Akira Gunji (DP)
Takumi Onuma (CDP)	Ryōsuke Kōzuki (LDP)	2022	Akiyoshi Katō (LDP)	Makiko Dōgomi (Ind.) (Note: Joined Democratic Party For the People in December 2025)
Shoko Sakurai (Sanseitō)	Ryōsuke Kōzuki (LDP)	2025	Akiyoshi Katō (LDP)	Makiko Dōgomi (Ind.)

== Election results ==
=== Elections in the 2020s ===
2025
Party	Candidate	Votes	%	±%
LDP	Ryōsuke Kōzuki (endorsed by Komeito)	417,601	33.5	
Sanseito	Shoko Sakurai	308,772	24.8	
CDP	Takumi Onuma	280,716	22.6	
Ishin	Serina Kitasaki	102,445	8.2	
JCP	Sei'ichirō Takahashi	66,866	5.4	
Independent	Yasushi Makiyama	36,529	2.9	
Anti-NHK	Akio Sagai	16,771	1.3	
Japan Reform Party	Ken'ichirō Ishii	15,148	1.2	
Turnout			54.67	

2022
Party	Candidate	Votes	%	±%
LDP	Akiyoshi Katō (endorsed by Komeito)	544,187	49.9	
Independent	Makiko Dōgomi (endorsed by CDP, DPFP)	197,292	18.1	
Ishin	Rika Sasaki	159,017	14.6	
JCP	Kumiko Ōuchi	105,735	9.7	
Sanseito	Masaya Kikuchi	48,582	4.5	
Anti-NHK	Daichi Murata	16,966	1.6	
Anti-NHK	Shigeyuki Niwa	14,724	1.3	
Independent	Tetsumasa Nakandakari	4,866	0.4	
Turnout				

=== Elections in the 2010s ===
2019
Party	Candidate	Votes	%	±%
LDP	Ryōsuke Kōzuki (endorsed by Komeito)	507,260	47.9	
CDP	Takumi Onuma (endorsed by SDP)	237,614	22.4	
JCP	Kumiko Ōuchi	129,151	12.2	
Ishin	Tōru Umino	125,542	11.9	
Anti-NHK	Ken Tanaka	58,978	5.6	
Turnout				

2016
Party	Candidate	Votes	%	±%
LDP	Hiroshi Okada (endorsed by Komeito)	609,636	50.3	
Democratic	Akira Gunji	306,050	25.3	
JCP	Kyoko Kobayashi	113,833	9.4	
Ishin	Yūko Mutō (endorsed by Genzei Nippon)	86,866	7.2	
Independent	Junko Ishihara	78,655	6.5	
Happiness Realization	Koki Nakamura	16,282	1.3	
Turnout			50.8	

2013
Party	Candidate	Votes	%	±%
LDP	Ryosuke Kouzuki (endorsed by Komeito)	560,642	48.4	
Democratic	Yukihisa Fujita	204,021	17.6	
Your	Junko Ishihara	153,403	13.3	
Restoration	Akira Ishii	127,823	11.0	
JCP	Kyoko Kobayashi	97,197	8.4	
Happiness Realization	Koki Nakamura	14,586	1.3	
Turnout				

2010
Party	Candidate	Votes	%	±%
LDP	Hiroshi Okada	499,566	38.7	
Democratic	Akira Gunji (Endorsed by People's New Party)	307,022	23.8	
Democratic	Tomohiro Nagatsuka	204,753	15.9	
Your	Shigenori Okawa	151,375	11.7	
Sunrise	Rie Yoshida	65,913	5.1	
JCP	Nobutoshi Inaba	50,136	3.9	
Happiness Realization	Koki Nakamura	11,664	0.9	
Turnout				

=== Elections in the 2000s ===
2007
Party	Candidate	Votes	%	±%
Democratic	Yukihisa Fujita	540,174	43.4	
LDP	Tamon Hasegawa	427,297	34.3	
Independent	Masao Ishizu	114,358	9.2	
JCP	Takeo Taya	86,288	6.9	
People's New	Toshitaka Kudo	52,621	4.2	
Kyōsei Shintō	Hiromitsu Muto	23,845	1.9	
Turnout				

2004
Party	Candidate	Votes	%	±%
LDP	Hiroshi Okada (endorsed by Komeito)	583,471	50.5	
Democratic	Akira Gunji	477,948	41.3	
JCP	Takeo Taya	94,837	8.2	
Turnout				

2003 By-Election
Party	Candidate	Votes	%	±%
LDP	Hiroshi Okada	717,140	80.6	
JCP	Osamu Kojima	172,455	19.4	
Turnout			39.61	

== See also ==
- List of districts of the House of Councillors of Japan
- Ibaraki 4th district, one of seven districts that represents Ibaraki Prefecture in the House of Representatives
