= Yukihisa Fujita =

Japanese politician

- 藤田 幸久
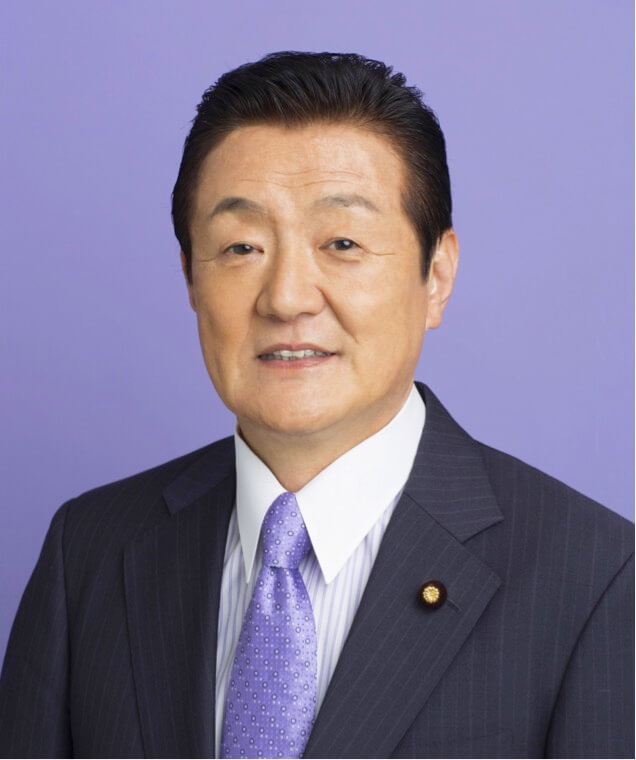
- Fujita, c. 2018

Member of the House of Councillors
- In office 29 July 2007 – 28 July 2019
- Preceded by: Moto Kobayashi
- Succeeded by: Takumi Onuma
- Constituency: Ibaraki at-large

Member of the House of Representatives
- In office 10 October 2003 – 8 August 2005
- Constituency: Tokyo PR
- In office 21 October 1996 – 2 June 2000
- Preceded by: Constituency established
- Succeeded by: Multi-member district
- Constituency: Tokyo PR

Personal details
- Born: 19 April 1950 (age 76) Hitachi, Ibaraki, Japan
- Party: CDP (since 2019)
- Other political affiliations: DP 1996 (1996–1998); DPJ (1998–2016); DP 2016 (2016–2018); DPP (2018–2019)
- Education: Keio University

Yukihisa Fujita (藤田 幸久, Fujita Yukihisa; born 19 April 1950) is a Japanese politician. He is a Visiting Research Fellow of the Department of Politics and International Relations at the University of Oxford, Chairman of the International IC (Initiatives of Change) Association of Japan and a Visiting Professor, Gifu Women's University.

He was a member of the House of Councillors, the upper house from the Ibaraki constituency and the House of Representatives, the lower house from the Tokyo constituency of Japan's parliament. In the House of Councillors he is a former Chair of the Committee on Financial Affairs, [1] Chairman of the Special Committee on North Korea Abduction Issue, and a Chairman of the Committee on Fundamental National Policies. He was a Director of the Committee on Foreign Affairs and Defence. He was a Vice Minister of Finance. He was a Shadow Foreign Minister and a Director-General of the DPJ's International Department. Prior to political life, he was a Director of the Association Aid and Relief (AAR), the first Japanese NGO to help refugees and an Executive Director of the International MRA Association of Japan. He was a lecturer at Yokohama National University.

== Early life and career ==
Fujita was born April 19, 1950, in Hitachi, Ibaraki. He graduated from Ibaraki University Junior High School in 1966, and Mito Dai-ichi High School in 1969. He attended the Department of Philosophy, the Faculty of Letters of Keio University and graduated with a B.A. in 1975.

From 1975 to 1977, Fujita participated in the Moral Re-Armament (MRA, now Initiatives of Change) Goodwill Mission "Song of Asia" program, and visited 14 countries with 50 youths from 15 countries in Asia and the Pacific staying at about 100 homes in those countries he visited. He has visited 53 countries and has participated in volunteer work in many of those countries. He has had homestays in over 200 homes. Fujita is a founding member of The Association for Aid and Relief Association for Aid and Relief, an NGO founded in 1979, and later became a member of the board of directors. In 1984, he became an Executive Director of the International MRA Association of Japan (Now International IC Association of Japan).

== Political career ==
=== House of Representatives (1996–2000; 2003–2005) ===
Fujita was elected twice to the Lower House of Japan's Parliament representing Tokyo. In 1996, established the Diet Member's League for a Total Ban on Anti-Personnel Landmines and helped then Foreign Minister Keizo Obuchi (later Prime Minister) to sign the 1997 Anti-Personnel Mines Ottawa Treaty.

=== House of Councillors (2007 to 2019) ===
Fujita was elected twice to the Upper House representing Ibaraki Prefecture.

Since 2009, he helped the Japanese Government to arrange an annual visit program for former American prisoners of war held by the Japanese military during the war to Japan. Was a Secretary General and of the Parliamentary group to support the World Conference for Religion and Peace (WCRP or RfP).

From September 2011 to October 2012, Fujita served in the Cabinet of Prime Minister Yoshihiko Noda as the Vice Minister of Finance. In charge of the Budget Bureau, the Finance Bureau and the Bank of Japan. Increased medical service and long-term care fees simultaneously for the first time after 10 years. Reduced 25% of the houses of national public officers to produce revenue by cutting administrative waste. Made the Great East Japan earthquake recovery budget.

== Political positions and policies ==
=== Diet Members' League activities during the period in the Diet ===
President, Diet Members' League to promote voting by overseas Japanese

President, Diet Members' League for international peace building

Director General, Diet Members' League to promote International Initiatives of Change (IC)

Vice President, Diet Members' League to support ex-Japanese POWs in Siberia

Member, Diet Members' League to vitalize shopping streets

Member, Diet Members' League to promote policies to emerge from deflation

- Fujita's political slogan is: "From crying face to smiling face."
- In his first term as a member of the House of Representatives, Fujita, as the Secretary General of the Diet Members' League for a Total Ban on Anti-Personnel Landmines, helped Foreign Minister Keizo Obuchi to sign the Ottawa Treaty.

=== Humanitarian assistance in emergency and disaster situations ===
- In April 2004, the DPJ sent Fujita to Jordan as the Director-General of the DPJ's International Department to rescue the Japanese NGO workers and journalists who were kidnapped in neighboring Iraq.
- The DPJ sent Fujita to provide operational assistance to Indonesia and Sri Lanka after the 2004 Indian Ocean earthquake and tsunami.
- The DPJ sent Fujita Pakistan after the 2005 Kashmir earthquake.
- In January, 2010, the DPJ sent Fujita to Haiti after the earthquake.
- In January, 2008, Fujita joined the Diet Members' League to Promote Raising the Legal Status of Korean and Other Settled Foreign Residents, which aims to enfranchise Korean and other permanent foreign residents.

== Issues and questions raised in the Japanese Parliament ==
Fujita, is known for confronting difficult issues in the Japanese parliament. He secured a significant, first-ever admission from Aso Mining regarding their use of war prisoners when Taro Aso was the prime minister. Additionally, he focused government attention on establishing clear guidelines regarding Japan's use of its Self-Defense Force to combat piracy. He also raised important questions related to how the Japanese government was helping the families of the Japanese victims of the attacks of September 11, 2001.

=== Views on POW and war-related issues ===
Much of Fujita's political career has been heavily invested in reconciliation issues. In Japan, he's known for his decades of tireless pursuit on the matter of Japan's wartime treatment of prisoners of war and for advocating the nation's need to make past wrongs right.

November 2008 led to Fujita questioning Prime Minister Taro Aso at the Committee on Foreign Affairs and Defense on whether Aso Mining (owned by the Aso family) had abused Allied prisoners of war (POWs) during the Second World War. Prime Minister Aso responded: "I was four, maybe five years old at the time. I was too young to recognize anything at that age." On December 18 of that year, and in response to a request by Fujita, The Ministry of Health and Labor Welfare released the documents that confirmed that Aso Mining had used 101 British, 197 Australian and 2 Dutch prisoners of war to dig coal in its mine. In response to things coming to light, Fujita is quoted as saying, "I suppose that as he has held several positions in government, including serving as foreign minister, he hoped there would be little chance of this being exposed.... It is, of course, related to war repatriations for individuals who suffered during the war, which the government does not want to pay and claims the issues have been settled...."

In January 2009, Prime Minister Aso acknowledged in the Diet for the first time that Aso Mining used Allied POWs during World War Two. Significant, in light of the fact that Prime Minister Aso refused to acknowledge that truth for 64 years. In February 2009, Fujita organized "The Debrief Meeting on Aso Mining's Use of Prisoners of War (POW) Labor" at the Diet Members' Building. At the meeting, Fujita noted Prime Minister Aso's comment before the Committee on Foreign Affairs and Defense but added, "The survivors and [POW's] families want an apology and compensation from Prime Minister Aso."

=== Use of the Japanese Self-Defense Force to combat piracy ===
In response to increasing levels of aggression on Japanese maritime interests traveling off the coast of Somalia and utilizing the Suez Canal between 2007 and 2008, the government was compelled to re-examine national security issues in relationship to international piracy.

At the DPJ's Committee for Foreign Affairs and Defense in February 2009, on the topic of sending the Self-Defense Force to the coast of Somalia as an anti-piracy measure, Fujita focused government attention on establishing clear guidelines on Japan's use of the Self-Defense Forces to combat piracy. Fujita called for the government to formulate a clear definition of "pirate" that went beyond the acts of piracy outlined under Japan's 1907 Penal Code, Act No. 45. He also pushed for obtaining detailed information about piracy elsewhere in the world.

== Books ==
A Politician Who Did Not Want to Become a Politician—Roles of NGO in Politics (2003)

== Other publications ==
1. Japan's Decisive Decade (revised edition, Translation, 2016)

2. Seeking 9/11 Truth at Japan's Parliament (Co-Authored, 2008)

3. United Nations and Global Civil Society

4. A Politician Who Did Not Want to Become Politician – Roles of NGO in Politics (2003)

5. World Peace from the Perspective of Religion (1991)

6. Japan's Decisive Decade (Translation, 1990)

7. Flame in the darkness on USSR Dissents (Translation, 1981)

== Articles ==
1. Oppenheimer apologised to atomic bomb survivors (For A New World Blog, August 30, 2024)

2. What the world needs: 'moral re-armament'? (For A New World Blog, February 5, 2024)

3. Cenotaph text in Hiroshima born in Caux, A message for today's world (For A New World Blog, October 6, 2023)

4. Don't forget Myanmar and Cambodia (Masukomi Shimin (Media and Citizen), June 2, 2022)

5. The Abe government versus the Emperor on history issues (THE JAPAN TIMES, October 16, 2015)

6. What Abe should tell Congress (THE JAPAN TIMES, April 17, 2015)

7. Aso Mining's Indelible Past : Prime Minister Aso should seek reconciliation with former POWs (Japan Focus, Masy 2009)
