= 2014 Japanese general election =

- 14 December 2014

All 475 seats in the House of Representatives 238 seats needed for a majority
- Turnout: 52.65% (▼6.67pp; Const. votes); 52.65% (▼6.66pp; PR votes)
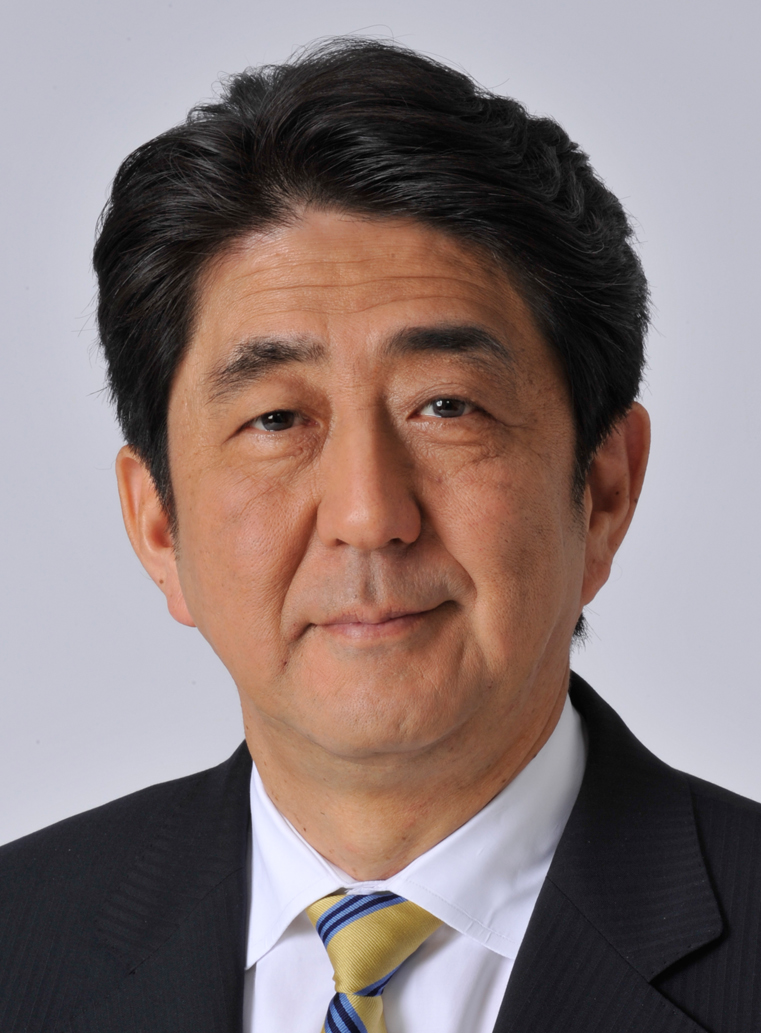

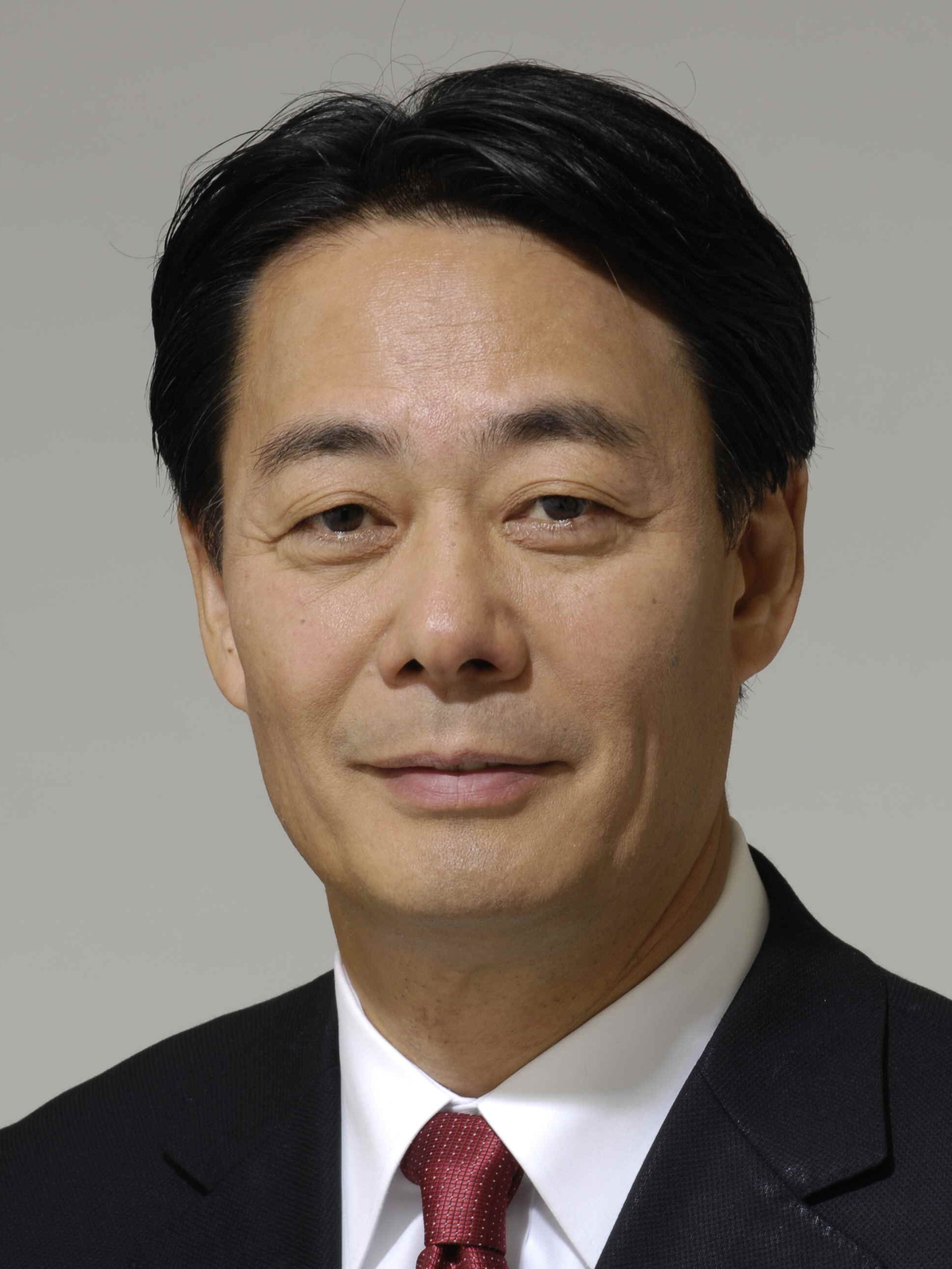

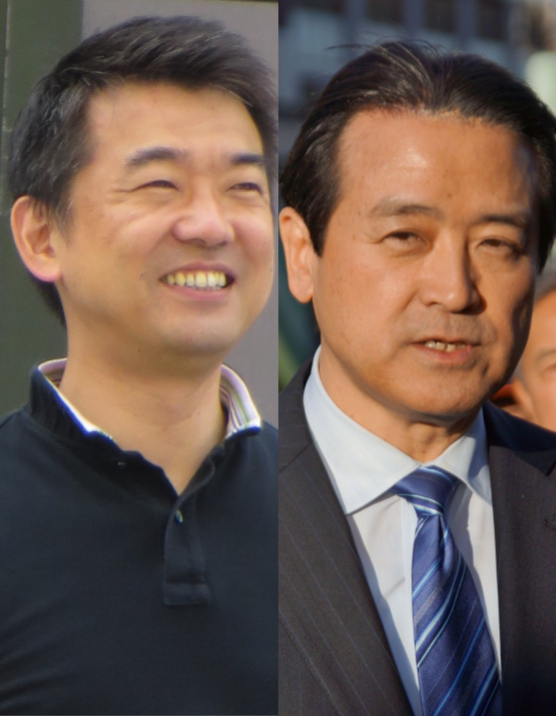

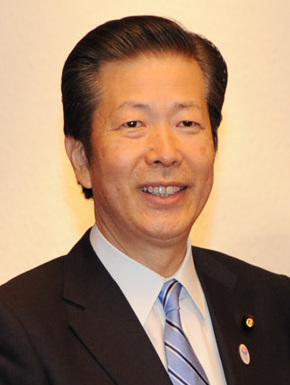

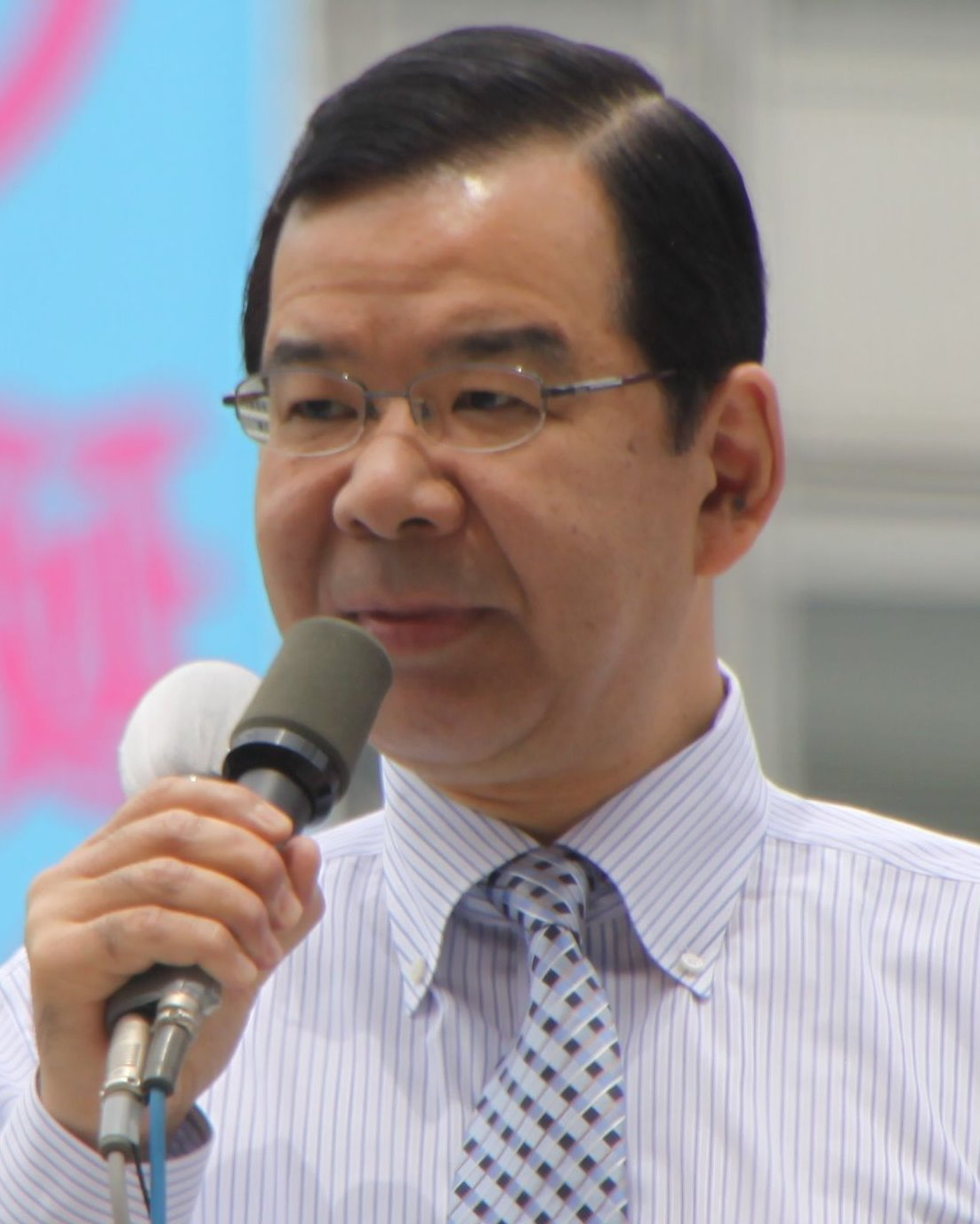

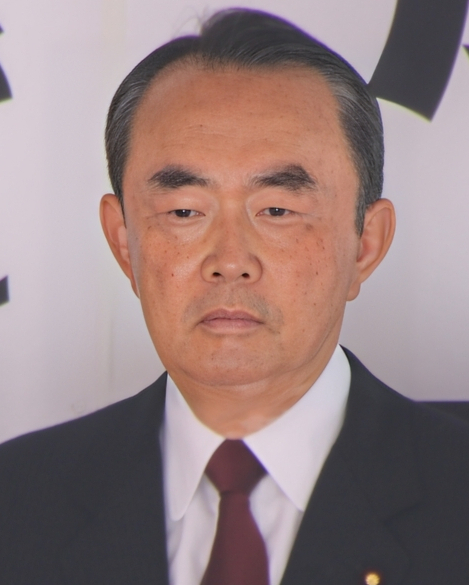
	First party	Second party	Third party
Leader	Shinzō Abe	Banri Kaieda	Toru Hashimoto; Kenji Eda
Party	LDP	Democratic	Innovation
Leader since	26 September 2012	25 December 2012	1 August 2014
Leader's seat	Yamaguchi 4th	Tokyo PR (Note: At last election, Kaieda ran in Tokyo 1st district but lost, re-elected in Tokyo PR block) (lost re-election)	Did not stand
Last election	294 seats	57 seats	54 seats (Note: as Japan Restoration Party)
Seats before	295	62	42
Seats won	291	73	41
Seat change	▼3	▲16	▼13
Constituency vote	25,461,449	11,916,849	4,319,646
% and swing	48.10% (▲5.09pp)	22.51% (▼0.30pp)	8.16% (▼3.48pp)
Regional vote	17,658,916	9,775,991	8,382,699
% and swing	33.11% (▲5.49pp)	18.33% (▲2.84pp)	15.72% (▼4.66pp)
	Fourth party	Fifth party	Sixth party
Leader	Natsuo Yamaguchi	Kazuo Shii	Takeo Hiranuma
Party	Komeito	JCP	Future Generations
Leader since	8 September 2009	24 November 2000	1 August 2014
Leader's seat	Did not stand (Note: Sits in the House of Councillors for the Tokyo at-large district)	Southern Kanto PR	Okayama 3rd
Last election	31 seats	8 seats	Did not exist
Seats before	31	8	19
Seats won	35	21	2
Seat change	▲4	▲13	New
Constituency vote	765,390	7,040,170	947,396
% and swing	1.45% (▼0.04pp)	13.30% (▲5.42pp)	1.79% (New)
Regional vote	7,314,236	6,062,962	1,414,919
% and swing	13.71% (▲1.81pp)	11.37% (▲5.20pp)	2.65% (New)
- districts and PR districts, shaded according to winners' vote strength
Prime Minister before election
Shinzō Abe
LDP
Elected Prime Minister
Shinzō Abe
LDP

General elections were held in Japan on 14 December 2014. Voting took place in all Representatives constituencies of Japan including proportional blocks to elect the members of the House of Representatives, the lower house of the National Diet of Japan. As the cabinet resigns in the first post-election Diet session after a general House of Representatives election (Constitution, Article 70), the lower house election also led to a new election of the prime minister in the Diet, won by incumbent Shinzō Abe, and the appointment of a new cabinet (with some ministers re-appointed). The voter turnout in this election remains the lowest in Japanese history.

== Background ==
In 2012, the Democratic Party government under Yoshihiko Noda decided to raise the Japanese consumption tax. This unpopular move allowed the Liberal Democratic Party under Shinzo Abe to regain control of the Japanese government in the 2012 Japanese general election. Abe proceeded to implement a series of economic programs known as "Abenomics" in a bid to stimulate the economy. Despite these programs, Japan entered a technical recession in mid-2014, which Abe blamed on the consumption tax hike, even though many members of the LDP supported the hike. Abe called a snap election on November 18, in part for the purpose of winning LDP backing to postpone the hike and pursue the Abenomics package.

The LDP government was widely expected to win the election in a landslide, and many observers viewed the snap election as a mechanism for Abe to entrench his government at a time of relative popularity.

Under 2013 changes to the electoral law designed to reduce malapportionment, district boundaries in 17 prefectures were redrawn and five districts are eliminated without replacement (one each in Fukui, Yamanashi, Tokushima, Kōchi and Saga). The number of first-past-the-post seats is reduced to 295, the total number of seats decreases to 475.

== Opinion polls ==
Parties' approval ratings from 2013 to 2014

(Source: NHK)

Date	LDP	DPJ	JRP	PFG	NKP	YP	PLP	JCP	SDP	GW	NRP	UP	JIP	Oth.	Und.	No Answer	Lead
5–7 December	38.1%	11.7%		0.1%	5.9%		0.3%	4.3%	0.9%		0.0%		3.7%	0.1%	26.3%	8.5%	11.8%
7–9 November	36.6%	7.9%		0.2%	2.2%	0.0%	0.0%	3.5%	0.6%				1.2%	0.1%	40.0%	7.7%	3.4%
11–13 October	40.2%	5.6%		0.1%	4.1%	0.5%	0.1%	3.3%	0.9%				1.4%	0.1%	35.0%	8.8%	5.2%
5–7 September	40.4%	5.4%	0.7%	0.1%	4.3%	0.0%	0.2%	3.3%	0.5%			0.1%		0.4%	36.9%	7.8%	3.5%
8–10 August	36.7%	6.4%	1.0%	0.3%	3.0%	0.2%	0.3%	3.2%	0.7%			0.0%		0.0%	39.4%	8.8%	2.7%
11–13 July	34.3%	4.8%	1.7%		3.6%	0.5%	0.3%	3.4%	0.9%			0.1%		0.3%	42.5%	7.6%	8.2%
6–8 June	36.9%	5.1%	1.1%		4.0%	0.4%	0.1%	2.8%	0.6%			0.0%		0.1%	42.4%	6.7%	5.5%
9–11 May	41.4%	5.6%	1.1%		3.7%	0.2%	0.3%	2.4%	0.9%			0.2%		0.1%	37.2%	6.9%	4.2%
11–13 April	38.1%	7.4%	1.3%		3.4%	0.9%	0.2%	3.6%	0.6%			0.1%		0.2%	37.2%	5.2%	0.9%
7–9 March	38.7%	6.5%	1.1%		2.2%	0.8%	0.1%	3.3%	0.8%			0.4%		0.1%	40.0%	5.2%	1.3%
7–9 February	36.2%	5.8%	1.3%		3.9%	1.1%	0.3%	3.3%	1.4%			0.5%		0.2%	41.0%	5.2%	4.8%
11–13 January	40.4%	5.8%	1.6%		2.8%	0.8%	0.1%	1.6%	0.7%			0.1%		0.3%	40.3%	5.5%	0.1%
2014
6–8 December	36.7%	7.8%	2.1%		2.8%	1.2%	0.2%	3.1%	0.6%					0.0%	38.7%	6.8%	2.0%
8–10 November	41.9%	5.2%	1.8%		4.4%	1.9%	0.3%	3.3%	0.4%					0.3%	35.1%	5.6%	6.8%
12–14 October	36.1%	5.2%	2.1%		3.8%	1.2%	0.2%	4.0%	0.5%					0.3%	41.8%	4.9%	5.7%
6–8 September	40.3%	5.5%	2.2%		4.4%	2.1%	0.0%	3.2%	0.7%					0.2%	34.6%	6.8%	5.7%
9–11 August	37.9%	7.3%	4.6%		4.6%	3.2%	0.2%	3.5%	0.8%					0.9%	30.8%	6.2%	7.1%
5–7 July	42.5%	8.0%	2.7%		5.3%	3.1%	0.5%	3.7%	0.9%	0.1%	0.0%			0.3%	24.5%	8.4%	18.0%
7–9 June	41.7%	5.8%	1.5%		5.1%	1.5%	0.1%	2.2%	0.4%	0.0%	0.0%			0.2%	34.6%	7.0%	7.1%
10–12 May	43.4%	5.3%	2.4%		3.7%	2.3%	0.3%	2.0%	1.1%	0.0%	0.0%			0.1%	33.3%	6.1%	10.1%
5–7 April	43.6%	6.1%	2.1%		3.7%	1.3%	0.4%	2.0%	0.7%	0.0%	0.0%			0.1%	34.5%	5.6%	9.1%
8–10 March	40.1%	7.0%	3.9%		4.4%	3.1%	0.3%	2.1%	0.6%	0.0%	0.0%			0.1%	31.8%	6.6%	8.3%
10–12 February	40.4%	7.0%	5.3%		3.1%	2.6%	0.3%	2.1%	0.8%	0.1%	0.0%			0.3%	31.7%	6.3%	8.7%
12–14 January	37.8%	7.6%	6.5%		4.0%	3.7%	0.5%	2.7%	0.8%	0.0%	0.0%			0.3%	30.8%	5.4%	7.0%
2013

Cabinet approval/disapproval ratings

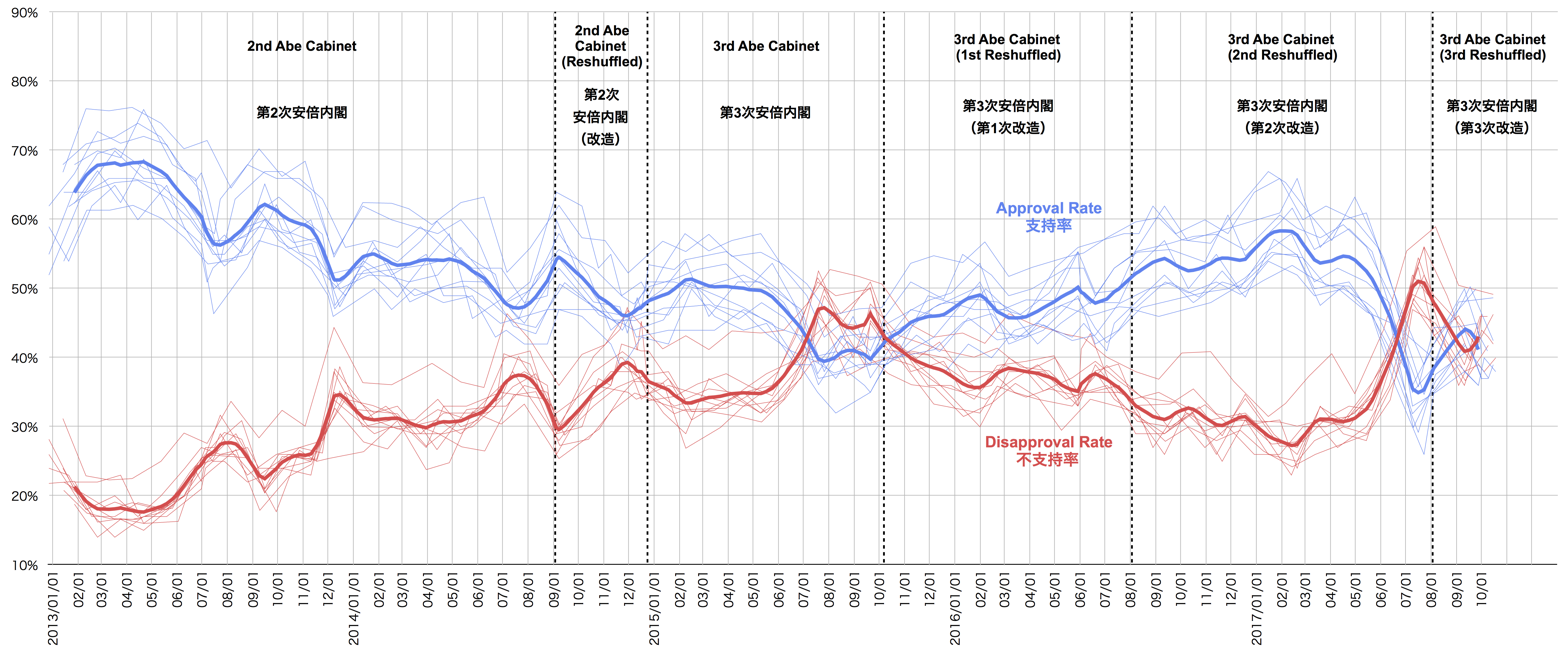
Approval (blue) and Disapproval (red) Ratings for Second and Third Abe Cabinet

Date	PM	Approval	Disapproval
5–7 December	Shinzo Abe	47%	38%
7–9 November	Shinzo Abe	44%	38%
11–13 October	Shinzo Abe	52%	34%
5–7 September	Shinzo Abe	58%	28%
8–10 August	Shinzo Abe	51%	33%
11–13 July	Shinzo Abe	47%	38%
6–8 June	Shinzo Abe	52%	32%
9–11 May	Shinzo Abe	56%	29%
11–13 April	Shinzo Abe	52%	31%
7–9 March	Shinzo Abe	51%	30%
7–9 February	Shinzo Abe	52%	33%
11–13 January	Shinzo Abe	54%	31%
2014
21–22 December	Shinzo Abe	49%	34%
6–8 December	Shinzo Abe	50%	35%
8–10 November	Shinzo Abe	60%	25%
12–14 October	Shinzo Abe	58%	26%
6–8 September	Shinzo Abe	59%	23%
9–11 August	Shinzo Abe	57%	29%
5–7 July	Shinzo Abe	57%	25%
7–9 June	Shinzo Abe	62%	20%
10–12 May	Shinzo Abe	65%	18%
5–7 April	Shinzo Abe	66%	19%
23–24 March	Shinzo Abe	69%	6%
9–10 March	Shinzo Abe	76%	22%
8–10 March	Shinzo Abe	66%	18%
10–12 February	Shinzo Abe	64%	20%
8–10 February	Shinzo Abe	71%	18%
12–14 January	Shinzo Abe	64%	22%
11–13 January	Shinzo Abe	68%	24%
2013

== Results ==
Constituency Cartogram

The LDP lost a small number of seats but slightly enlarged its majority coalition with Komeito. Turnout was a record low, and many voters viewed the election as a waste of time and money. DPJ president Banri Kaieda lost his seat in Tokyo while the Japanese Communist Party doubled in strength. The right-leaning Japan Innovation Party and Party for Future Generations lost seats.

Party	Proportional			Constituency			Total seats	+/–
Party	Votes	%	Seats	Votes	%	Seats	Total seats	+/–
Liberal Democratic Party	17,658,916	33.11	68	25,461,449	48.10	223	291	−3
Democratic Party of Japan	9,775,991	18.33	35	11,916,849	22.51	38	73	+16
Japan Innovation Party	8,382,699	15.72	30	4,319,646	8.16	11	41	−13
Komeito	7,314,236	13.71	26	765,390	1.45	9	35	+4
Japanese Communist Party	6,062,962	11.37	20	7,040,170	13.30	1	21	+13
Party for Future Generations	1,414,919	2.65	0	947,396	1.79	2	2	New
Social Democratic Party	1,314,441	2.46	1	419,347	0.79	1	2	0
People's Life Party	1,028,721	1.93	0	514,575	0.97	2	2	−7
Happiness Realization Party	260,111	0.49	0				0	0
Shiji Seitō Nashi	104,854	0.20	0				0	New
New Renaissance Party	16,597	0.03	0				0	0
Genzei Nippon				32,759	0.06	0	0	New
Future Party				4,883	0.01	0	0	New
Katsuko Inumaru and Republican Party				4,668	0.01	0	0	0
World Economic Community Party				1,416	0.00	0	0	0
Independents				1,511,242	2.85	8	8	+3
Total	53,334,447	100.00	180	52,939,790	100.00	295	475	−5
Valid votes	53,334,447	97.45		52,939,790	96.71			
Invalid/blank votes	1,398,283	2.55		1,801,562	3.29			
Total votes	54,732,730	100.00		54,741,352	100.00			
Registered voters/turnout	103,962,785	52.65		103,962,784	52.65			
Source: Ministry of Internal Affairs and Communications, CLEA

=== By prefecture ===
Prefecture	Total seats	Seats won								
Prefecture	Total seats	LDP	DPJ	JIP	Komei	PFG	PLP	JCP	SDP	Ind.
Aichi	15	8	6	1						
Akita	3	3								
Aomori	4	4								
Chiba	13	11	2							
Ehime	4	4								
Fukui	2	2								
Fukuoka	11	11								
Fukushima	5	3	1	1						
Gifu	5	5								
Gunma	5	5								
Hiroshima	7	6								1
Hokkaido	12	8	3		1					
Hyōgo	12	7	1	1	2					1
Ibaraki	7	5	1							1
Ishikawa	3	3								
Iwate	4	1	2				1			
Kagawa	3	2	1							
Kagoshima	5	4								1
Kanagawa	18	13	2	1	1					1
Kōchi	2	2								
Kumamoto	5	4				1				
Kyoto	6	4	2							
Mie	5	3	2							
Miyagi	6	5	1							
Miyazaki	3	3								
Nagano	5	3	1	1						
Nagasaki	4	4								
Nara	4	3	1							
Niigata	6	5	1							
Ōita	3	2	1							
Okayama	5	4				1				
Okinawa	4						1	1	1	1
Osaka	19	9	1	5	4					
Saga	2	1	1							
Saitama	15	12	2							1
Shiga	4	4								
Shimane	2	2								
Shizuoka	8	6	2							
Tochigi	5	4	1							
Tokushima	2	2								
Tokyo	25	22	1	1	1					
Tottori	2	2								
Toyama	3	3								
Wakayama	3	2	1							
Yamagata	3	3								
Yamaguchi	4	4								
Yamanashi	2		1							1
Total	295	223	38	11	9	2	2	1	1	8

=== By PR block ===
PR block	Total seats	Seats won					
PR block	Total seats	LDP	DPJ	JIP	Komei	JCP	SDP
Chūgoku	11	5	2	1	2	1	
Hokkaido	8	3	2	1	1	1	
Hokuriku–Shinetsu	11	5	3	1	1	1	
Kinki (Kansai)	29	9	4	8	4	4	
Kyushu	21	8	3	3	4	2	1
Northern Kanto	20	8	4	3	3	2	
Shikoku	6	3	1	1	1		
Southern Kanto	22	8	4	4	3	3	
Tohoku	14	5	4	2	2	1	
Tōkai	21	8	5	3	3	2	
Tokyo	17	6	3	3	2	3	
Total	180	68	35	30	26	20	1

=== Notable losses ===
The most high-profile LDP candidate to lose re-election is Agriculture Minister Koya Nishikawa, who lost by 199 votes (0.2%) to former Governor of Tochigi Akio Fukuda. He was questioned in October after allegedly receiving financial support from a fraudulent company.

Amongst the DPJ members to lose their seats were party leader Banri Kaieda. Party for Future Generations leader Shintaro Ishihara was also unsuccessful in his attempt to win a seat after receiving a low position on his party's representative ballot.

Former leader of the now-dissolved Your Party and six-term representative for Tochigi-3rd district Yoshimi Watanabe was also defeated.

The JCP gained its first single-seat constituency seat since the 1996 election. Amidst a growing anti-base movement in Okinawa, JCP candidate Seiken Akamine unseated LDP incumbent Kōnosuke Kokuba in a night marked with a nationwide JCP surge.

== Aftermath ==
In November 2015 the Grand Bench of the Supreme Court ruled that the inequality in vote weight due to malapportionment was still in an unconstitutional state (iken jōtai); however, as in previous such rulings, it dismissed the demand to invalidate the election.
