= Kaoru Yosano =

Japanese politician (1938–2017)

- 与謝野 馨
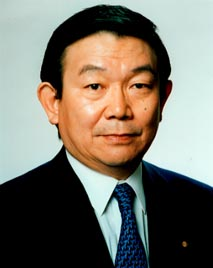
- Official portrait, 1998

Minister of Finance
- In office 18 February 2009 – 16 September 2009
- Prime Minister: Tarō Asō
- Preceded by: Shōichi Nakagawa
- Succeeded by: Hirohisa Fujii

Chief Cabinet Secretary
- In office 27 August 2007 – 25 September 2007
- Prime Minister: Shinzo Abe
- Preceded by: Yasuhisa Shiozaki
- Succeeded by: Nobutaka Machimura

Minister of International Trade and Industry
- In office 30 July 1998 – 5 October 1999
- Prime Minister: Keizō Obuchi
- Preceded by: Mitsuo Horiuchi
- Succeeded by: Takashi Fukaya

Deputy Chief Cabinet Secretary (Political affairs)
- In office 7 November 1996 – 11 September 1997
- Prime Minister: Ryutaro Hashimoto
- Preceded by: Mitsuharu Warashina
- Succeeded by: Fukushiro Nukaga

Minister of Education
- In office 30 June 1994 – 8 August 1995
- Prime Minister: Tomiichi Murayama
- Preceded by: Ryōko Akamatsu
- Succeeded by: Yoshinobu Shimamura

Member of the House of Representatives
- In office 10 November 2003 – 16 November 2012
- Constituency: Tokyo PR (2003–2005); Tokyo 1st (2005–2009); Tokyo PR (2009–2012)
- In office 23 June 1980 – 2 June 2000
- Preceded by: Yoshiaki Kiura
- Succeeded by: Banri Kaieda
- Constituency: Former Tokyo 1st (1980–1996); Tokyo 1st (1996–2000)
- In office 10 December 1976 – 7 September 1979
- Preceded by: Yojirō Konno
- Succeeded by: Yoshiaki Kiura
- Constituency: Former Tokyo 1st

Personal details
- Born: 22 August 1938 Kōjimachi, Tokyo, Japan
- Died: 23 May 2017 (aged 78) Tokyo, Japan
- Party: Liberal Democratic (1976–2010; 2017)
- Other political affiliations: Sunrise (2010–2011); Independent (2011–2017)
- Parents: Shigeru Yosano (father); Michiko Yosano (mother)
- Relatives: Yosano Akiko (grandmother)
- Education: University of Tokyo
- Website: Official website

Kaoru Yosano (与謝野 馨, Yosano Kaoru) (22 August 1938 – 23 May 2017) was a Japanese politician. He was a member of the Liberal Democratic Party (LDP), the Sunrise Party of Japan and former member of the House of Representatives, serving his ninth term in the Lower House representing Tokyo's first electoral district until his defeat in the 2009 Japanese general election. He was Chief Cabinet Secretary to Prime Minister Shinzo Abe from August 2007 to September 2007, and Minister of Economic and Fiscal Policy in Tarō Asō's administration from February to September 2009.

== Political career ==
Born the grandson of poets Yosano Akiko and Yosano Tekkan in Tokyo, Yosano graduated from the University of Tokyo in 1963. In 1972 he unsuccessfully ran for the House of Representatives, then served as secretary to Yasuhiro Nakasone. He ran again in 1976 and was elected. On 27 August 2007, he was appointed Chief Cabinet Secretary to Prime Minister Shinzo Abe, replacing Yasuhisa Shiozaki. He was replaced by Nobutaka Machimura on 27 September when Yasuo Fukuda succeeded Abe. He was appointed as Minister of Economic and Fiscal Policy and Minister of Regulatory Reform on 1 August 2008.

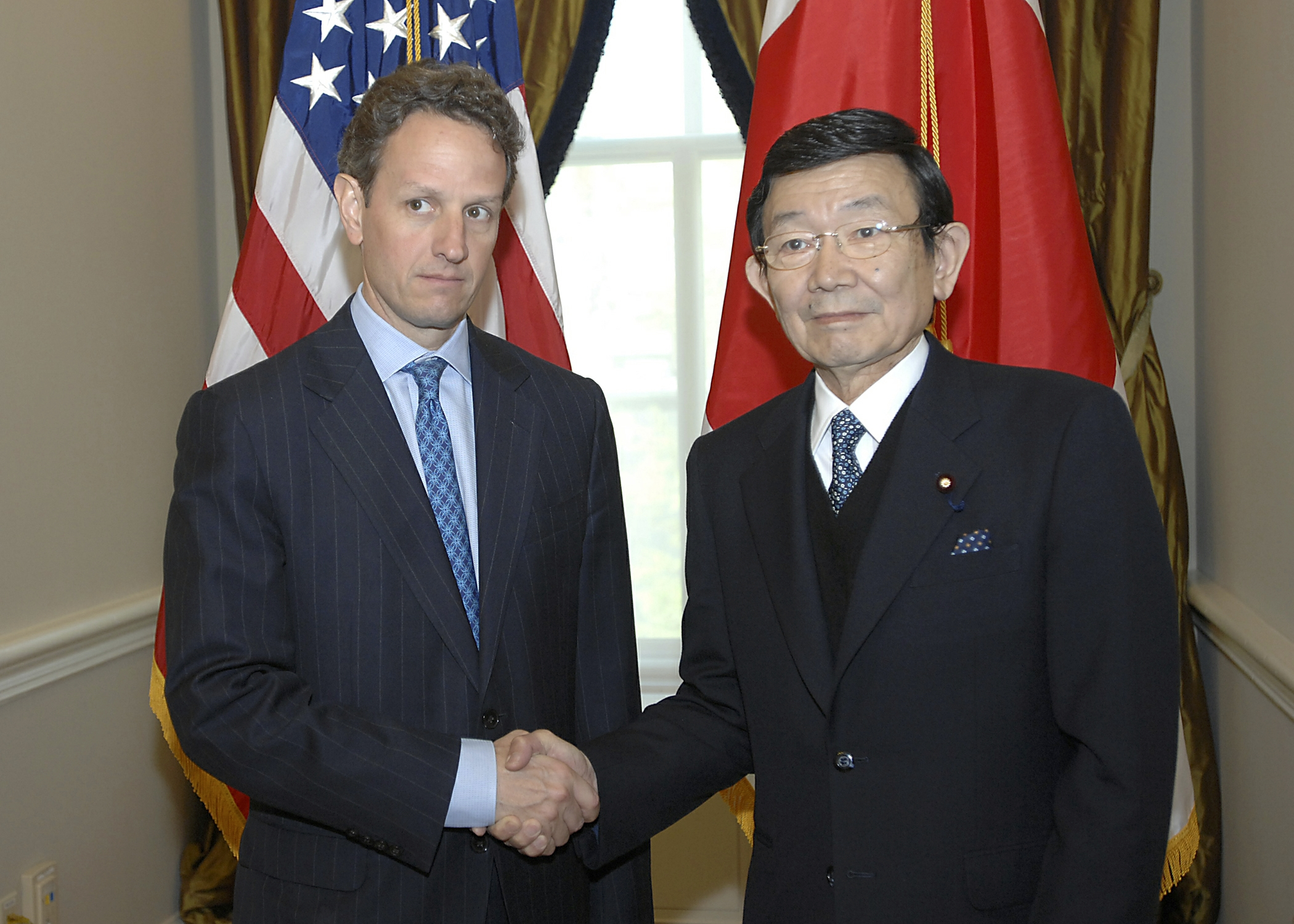
Yosano meeting with U.S. Secretary of Treasury Timothy Geithner in 2009

Following the resignation of Prime Minister Yasuo Fukuda, Yosano announced his candidacy for the LDP presidency on 8 September 2008:

"I believe politicians should never mislead the public by showing some rosy pictures. The LDP is facing the biggest crisis since its creation. I will contest the election with high spirits and the courage to lead Japan. Japan is going through a crisis. I will battle the situation for the benefit of the people."

In the leadership election, held on 22 September 2008, Tarō Asō was elected with 351 of the 527 votes, while Yosano trailed in second place with 66 votes. In Aso's cabinet, appointed on 24 September 2008, Yosano retained his post as Minister of Economic and Fiscal Policy. On 18 February 2009, with the resignation of Shoichi Nakagawa on the case of the G7 conference, he took office as Minister of Finance and Minister in charge of financial services.

On 4 April 2010, Yosano, Takeo Hiranuma, Hiroyuki Sonoda, Takao Fujii and Yoshio Nakagawa announced their plans to leave the LDP to establish a new political party, the Sunrise Party of Japan. He left the Sunrise Party on 13 January 2011 to join the Naoto Kan's cabinet as Minister of State for Economic and Fiscal Policy.

Yosano was known for advocating an increase in the consumption tax to reconstruct the nation's debt-ridden fiscal structure. After joining the DPJ government, he drew up the plans for the 2012 consumption tax increase. The legislation was passed through the House of Representatives on 26 June 2012 and passed the Upper House on 10 August 2012.

== Personal life and death ==
His hobbies included golf, making computers, photography, fishing, and playing Japanese board games. He was a Roman Catholic.

It was announced on 5 September 2012, that he would not run for re-election as he was suffering from throat cancer and had difficulty speaking. Yosano died on 23 May 2017.

House of Representatives (Japan)
Preceded by Yojirō Konno; Eiichi Tanaka; Kiyomasa Katō	Representative for Tokyo 1st district (multi-member); 1976–1979; 1980–1996; Served alongside: Yūji Ōtsuka, Banri Kaieda, several others	Constituency abolished
New title New constituency	Representative for Tokyo 1st district 1996–2000	Succeeded by Banri Kaieda
Preceded by Banri Kaieda	Representative for Tokyo 1st district 2005–2009	Succeeded by Banri Kaieda
N/A	Representative for the Tokyo block (PR); 2003–2005; 2009–2012	N/A
Political offices
Preceded by Banri Kaieda	Minister of State for Economic and Fiscal Policy; 2011	Succeeded by Motohisa Furukawa
Preceded by Tomiko Okazaki	Minister of State for Social Affairs and Gender Equality; 2011	Succeeded by Renho
Preceded by Shōichi Nakagawa	Minister of Finance; 2009	Succeeded by Hirohisa Fujii
Preceded by Shōichi Nakagawa	Minister of State for Financial Services; 2009	Succeeded by Shizuka Kamei
Preceded by Hiroko Ōta	Minister of State for Economic and Fiscal Policy; 2008–2009	Succeeded by Yoshimasa Hayashi
Preceded by Tatsuya Ito	Minister of State for Financial Services; 2005–2006	Succeeded by Yuji Yamamoto
Preceded by Yasuhisa Shiozaki	Chief Cabinet Secretary; August 2007 – September 2007	Succeeded by Nobutaka Machimura
Preceded by Heizō Takenaka	Minister of State for Economic and Fiscal Policy; 2005–2006	Succeeded by Hiroko Ōta
Preceded by Mitsuo Horiuchi	Minister for International Trade and Industry; 1998–1999	Succeeded by Takashi Fukaya
Preceded by Mitsuharu Warashina	Deputy Chief Cabinet Secretary (Political affairs); 1996–1997	Succeeded by Fukushiro Nukaga
Preceded by Ryoko Akamatsu	Minister of Education; 1994–1995	Succeeded by Yoshinobu Shimamura
Party political offices
New political party	Co-Leader of Tachigare Nippon; Served alongside: Takeo Hiranuma	Succeeded by Takeo Hiranuma (as sole leader)
Preceded by Hakuo Yanagisawa	Chairman of the Tax Research Commission, Liberal Democratic Party; 2006	Succeeded by Yuji Tsushima
Preceded by Fukushiro Nukaga	Chairman of the Policy Research Council, Liberal Democratic Party; 2004–2005	Succeeded by Hidenao Nakagawa
Preceded by Yoshinobu Shimamura	Chief of the Public Relations Headquarters, Liberal Democratic Party; 1997–1998	Succeeded by Mikio Okuda
Preceded by Kōichi Hamada	Chairman of the Public Relations Committee, Liberal Democratic Party; 1993–1994	Succeeded by Seishirō Etō
