= Results of the 2003 Japanese general election =

- 9 November 2003
- All 480 seats in the House of Representatives; 241 seats needed for a majority
Party	Leader	Seats	+/–
LDP	Junichiro Koizumi	237	+4
Democratic	Naoto Kan	177	+28
New Kōmeitō	Takenori Kanzaki	34	+3
JCP	Kazuo Shii	9	−11
Social Democratic	Takako Doi	6	−13
New Conservative	Hiroshi Kumagai	4	−3
IA	Masami Tanabu	1	−4
Liberal League	Torao Tokuda	1	0
Independents	–	11	−4
This lists parties that won seats. See the complete results below.
- Constituency seats
- All 300 seats
- Turnout: 59.85% (▼2.64pp)
Party	Vote %	Seats	+/–
LDP	43.85	168	−9
Democratic	36.66	105	+21
JCP	8.13	0	0
Social Democratic	2.87	1	−3
New Kōmeitō	1.49	9	+2
New Conservative	1.33	4	−3
IA	0.84	1	−4
Liberal League	0.16	1	0
Independents	4.58	11	−4
This lists parties that won seats. See the complete results below.
- Proportional seats
- All 180 seats
- Turnout: 59.80% (▼2.64pp)
Party	Vote %	Seats	+/–
Democratic	37.39	72	+7
LDP	34.96	69	+13
New Kōmeitō	14.78	25	+1
JCP	7.76	9	−11
Social Democratic	5.12	5	−10
This lists parties that won seats. See the complete results below.
Results by constituency and PR seats, shaded according to vote strength
Prime Minister before	Prime Minister after
Junichiro Koizumi; LDP	Junichiro Koizumi; LDP

This article presents detailed results of the 2003 Japanese general election. The results are separated into each of the eleven proportional representation blocks and their corresponding prefectures. In the following tables, candidates elected via single-member district are highlighted in green, while candidates elected via proportional representation are highlighted in red.

== Electoral system ==
The House of Representatives is elected via parallel voting. In the 2003 election, 300 members were elected in single-member districts and 180 via party-list proportional representation in eleven multi-member constituencies, referred to as "PR blocks". Single-member districts are apportioned between prefectures and numbered (1st, 2nd, etc). Candidates may run solely in a single-member district, solely in PR, or both (dual listing). Dual listed candidates must win at least 10% of the vote in their single-member district in order to be eligible for election via PR. Dual listed candidates who win their single-member district race are not eligible for election via PR.

Candidates on PR lists may be ranked sequentially or, if they are dual listed, ranked equally with one another. If ranked equally, the best-loser ratio (sekihairitsu) of each candidate determines the order of election. This number is determined by dividing their single-member district votes by those of the winning candidate in that district. In this way, the losing candidates who performed best will be elected first.

If a party wins more PR seats than they have eligible candidates on their list, the unfilled seats will be distributed to other parties in accordance with the PR formula.

== Hokkaido block ==
2003 Japanese general election in Hokkaido
- 9 November 2003

All 21 seats to the House of Representatives
	Majority party	Minority party	Third party
Party	DPJ	LDP	Komei
Last election	9 seats	9 seats	1 seat
Constituency	7	5	0
PR seats	4	3	1
Total	11	8	1
Seat change	▲2	▼1	0
	Fourth party	Fifth party
Party	JCP	SDP
Last election	1 seat	1 seat
Constituency	0	0
PR seats	0	0
Total	0	0
Seat change	▼1	▼1

Single-member constituency results in Hokkaido
Constituency	Previous member		Elected member		Votes	%	Margin	Runner-up		%	Status
Hokkaido 1st	Takahiro Yokomichi	DPJ	Takahiro Yokomichi	DPJ	143,907	55.4	54,149	Takayuki Mishina	LDP	34.6	DPJ hold
Hokkaido 2nd	Takamori Yoshikawa	LDP	Wakio Mitsui	DPJ	107,840	45.6	24,267	Takamori Yoshikawa	LDP	35.3	DPJ gain from LDP
Hokkaido 3rd	Satoshi Arai	DPJ	Satoshi Arai	DPJ	114,131	46.8	2,879	Gaku Ishizaki	LDP	45.6	DPJ hold
Hokkaido 4th	Shizuo Sato	LDP	Yoshio Hachiro	DPJ	100,883	49.0	16,889	Shizuo Sato	LDP	40.8	DPJ gain from LDP
Hokkaido 5th	Nobutaka Machimura	LDP	Nobutaka Machimura	LDP	129,035	47.0	8,843	Chiyomi Kobayashi	DPJ	43.7	LDP hold
Hokkaido 6th	Hidenori Sasaki	DPJ	Hiroshi Imazu	LDP	112,270	40.2	614	Hidenori Sasaki	DPJ	39.9	LDP gain from DPJ
Hokkaido 7th	Eiko Kaneta	LDP	Naoto Kitamura	LDP	85,585	49.8	13,077	Hiroko Nakano	DPJ	42.2	LDP hold
Hokkaido 8th	Yoshio Hachiro	DPJ	Seiichi Kaneta	DPJ	106,709	42.2	32,227	Kenji Sato	LDP	29.5	DPJ hold
Hokkaido 9th	Yukio Hatoyama	DPJ	Yukio Hatoyama	DPJ	141,442	50.0	22,484	Hirofumi Iwakura	LDP	42.1	DPJ hold
Hokkaido 10th	Tadamasa Kodaira	DPJ	Tadamasa Kodaira	DPJ	121,516	49.3	14,956	Takafumi Yamashita	LDP	43.2	DPJ hold
Hokkaido 11th	Shōichi Nakagawa	LDP	Shōichi Nakagawa	LDP	112,210	62.0	59,815	Keiko Yamauchi	SDP	29.6	LDP hold
Hokkaido 12th	Tsutomu Takebe	LDP	Tsutomu Takebe	LDP	118,258	54.3	35,527	Kenko Matsuki	DPJ	38.0	LDP hold
Hokkaido 13th	Naoto Kitamura	LDP	Seat abolished								LDP loss

Proportional representation results
Party	Votes	Seats	Rank	Elected member	Constituency	Ratio
DPJ	1,153,471 (40.8%)	4	3	Hidenori Sasaki	Hokkaido 6th	99.4%
DPJ	1,153,471 (40.8%)	4	3	Chiyomi Kobayashi	Hokkaido 5th	93.1%
DPJ	1,153,471 (40.8%)	4	3	Hiroko Nakano	Hokkaido 7th	84.7%
DPJ	1,153,471 (40.8%)	4	3	Kenko Matsuki	Hokkaido 12th	69.9%
LDP	876,653 (31.0%)	3	1	Eiko Kaneta		
LDP	876,653 (31.0%)	3	2	Gaku Ishizaki	Hokkaido 3rd	97.4%
LDP	876,653 (31.0%)	3	2	Takafumi Yamashita	Hokkaido 10th	87.6%
Komei	394,843 (14.0%)	1	1	Kaori Maruya		

== Tohoku block ==
2003 Japanese general election in Tohoku
- 9 November 2003

All 39 seats to the House of Representatives
	Majority party	Minority party	Third party
Party	LDP	DPJ	Komei
Last election	20 seats	15 seats (Note: DPJ and LP)	1 seat
Constituency	14	8	0
PR seats	6	5	1
Total	20	13	1
Seat change	0	▼2	0
	Fourth party	Fifth party	Sixth party
Party	JCP	SDP	IA
Last election	1 seat	1 seat	2 seats
Constituency	0	0	1
PR seats	1	1	–
Total	1	1	1
Seat change	0	0	▼1
	Seventh party
Party	Ind.
Last election	0 seats
Constituency	2
PR seats	–
Total	2
Seat change	▲2

Single-member constituency results in Tohoku
Constituency	Previous member		Elected member		Votes	%	Margin	Runner-up		%	! Status
Aomori 1st	Yūji Tsushima	LDP	Yūji Tsushima	LDP	81,511	39.7	6,712	Hokuto Yokoyama	Ind.	36.4	LDP hold
Aomori 2nd	Vacant	IA	Akinori Eto	LDP	96,784	75.1	75,247	Koichi Saito	SDP	16.7	LDP gain from IA
Aomori 3rd	Tadamori Ōshima	LDP	Tadamori Ōshima	LDP	86,909	53.5	16,634	Masayo Tanabu	DPJ	43.3	LDP hold
Aomori 4th	Tarō Kimura	LDP	Tarō Kimura	LDP	110,675	63.6	69,811	Osamu Shibutani	DPJ	23.5	LDP hold
Iwate 1st	Takuya Tasso	DPJ	Takuya Tasso	DPJ	91,025	53.6	33,126	Atsushi Oikawa	LDP	34.1	DPJ hold
Iwate 2nd	Shun'ichi Suzuki	LDP	Shun'ichi Suzuki	LDP	116,854	58.4	44,255	Kentaro Kudo	DPJ	36.3	LDP hold
Iwate 3rd	Toru Kikawada	DPJ	Toru Kikawada	DPJ	93,862	51.0	14,409	Riki Nakamura	LDP	43.2	DPJ hold
Iwate 4th	Ichirō Ozawa	DPJ	Ichirō Ozawa	DPJ	128,458	65.1	91,207	Tokuichiro Tamazawa	LDP	18.9	DPJ hold
Miyagi 1st	Azuma Konno	DPJ	Azuma Konno	DPJ	106,821	50.8	22,256	Tōru Doi	LDP	40.2	DPJ hold
Miyagi 2nd	Sayuri Kamata	DPJ	Sayuri Kamata	DPJ	98,028	45.4	3,407	Masashi Nakano	LDP	43.8	DPJ hold
Miyagi 3rd	Hiroshi Mitsuzuka	LDP	Akihiro Nishimura	LDP	74,045	46.3	242	Kiyohito Hashimoto	DPJ	46.2	LDP hold
Miyagi 4th	Shintaro Ito	LDP	Shintaro Ito	LDP	76,554	40.2	15,354	Shuntaro Honma	Ind.	32.1	LDP hold
Miyagi 5th	Jun Azumi	DPJ	Jun Azumi	DPJ	73,135	50.7	9,013	Masami Saito	LDP	44.5	DPJ hold
Miyagi 6th	Masamitsu Oishi	DPJ	Itsunori Onodera	LDP	82,750	50.7	24,330	Masamitsu Oishi	DPJ	35.8	LDP gain from DPJ
Akita 1st	Koji Futada	LDP	Manabu Terata	DPJ	68,586	44.1	18,809	Takao Sato	LDP	32.0	DPJ gain from LDP
Akita 2nd	Hosei Norota	LDP	Hosei Norota	LDP	109,296	53.6	53,327	Shigehito Sasaki	DPJ	27.5	LDP hold
Akita 3rd	Kanezo Muraoka	LDP	Nobuhide Minorikawa	Ind.	133,981	49.7	16,528	Kanezo Muraoka	LDP	43.5	Ind. gain from LDP
Yamagata 1st	Michihiko Kano	DPJ	Toshiaki Endo	LDP	100,764	49.9	19,184	Michihiko Kano	DPJ	40.4	LDP gain from DPJ
Yamagata 2nd	Takehiko Endo	LDP	Takehiko Endo	LDP	124,591	51.8	17,745	Yōsuke Kondō	DPJ	44.4	LDP hold
Yamagata 3rd	Riichiro Chikaoka	LDP	Koichi Kato	Ind.	137,206	58.9	52,260	Jun Saito	DPJ	36.5	Ind. gain from LDP
Yamagata 4th	Koichi Kato	Ind.	Seat abolished								Ind. loss
Fukushima 1st	Tatsuo Sato	LDP	Tatsuo Sato	LDP	98,896	34.9	1,942	Yoshitami Kameoka	IA	34.2	LDP hold
Fukushima 2nd	Takumi Nemoto	LDP	Takumi Nemoto	LDP	108,838	51.0	14,324	Teruhiko Mashiko	DPJ	44.3	LDP hold
Fukushima 3rd	Kōichirō Genba	DPJ	Kōichirō Genba	DPJ	110,606	52.0	16,193	Hiroyuki Arai	LDP	44.4	DPJ hold
Fukushima 4th	Kōzō Watanabe	IA	Kōzō Watanabe	IA	97,014	52.3	18,955	Hideo Yamauchi	LDP	42.0	IA hold
Fukushima 5th	Masayoshi Yoshino	LDP	Goji Sakamoto	LDP	100,600	48.1	16,120	Izumi Yoshida	DPJ	40.4	LDP hold

Proportional representation results
Party	Votes	Seats	Rank	Elected member	Constituency	Ratio
LDP	1,794,284 (37.6%)	6	1	Masayoshi Yoshino		
LDP	1,794,284 (37.6%)	6	2	Koji Futada		
LDP	1,794,284 (37.6%)	6	3	Koki Hagino		
LDP	1,794,284 (37.6%)	6	4	Kyoichi Tsushima		
LDP	1,794,284 (37.6%)	6	5	Tokuichiro Tamazawa	Iwate 4th	28.9%
LDP	1,794,284 (37.6%)	6	6	Masashi Nakano	Miyagi 2nd	96.5%
DPJ	1,784,768 (37.4%)	5	1	Kiyohito Hashimoto	Miyagi 3rd	99.6%
DPJ	1,784,768 (37.4%)	5	1	Teruhiko Mashiko	Fukushima 2nd	86.8%
DPJ	1,784,768 (37.4%)	5	1	Yōsuke Kondō	Yamagata 2nd	85.7%
DPJ	1,784,768 (37.4%)	5	1	Izumi Yoshida	Fukushima 5th	83.9%
DPJ	1,784,768 (37.4%)	5	1	Michihiko Kano	Yamagata 1st	80.9%
Komei	565,179 (11.9%)	1	1	Yoshihisa Inoue		
JCP	313,290 (6.6%)	1	1	Chizuko Takahashi		
SDP	310,187 (6.5%)	1	1	Kiyohiro Yamamoto	Akita 2nd	25.2%

== Northern Kanto block ==
2003 Japanese general election in Northern Kanto
- 9 November 2003

All 52 seats to the House of Representatives
	Majority party	Minority party	Third party
Party	LDP	DPJ	Komei
Last election	27 seats	15 seats	3 seats
Constituency	23	9	0
PR seats	8	8	3
Total	31	17	3
Seat change	▲4	▲2	0
	Fourth party	Fifth party
Party	JCP	SDP
Last election	2 seats	1 seat
Constituency	0	0
PR seats	1	0
Total	1	0
Seat change	▼1	▼1

Single-member constituency results in Northern Kanto
Constituency	Previous member		Elected member		Votes	%	Margin	Runner-up		%	Status
Ibaraki 1st	Norihiko Akagi	LDP	Norihiko Akagi	LDP	128,349	58.7	50,929	Nobuyuki Fukushima	DPJ	35.4	LDP hold
Ibaraki 2nd	Fukushiro Nukaga	LDP	Fukushiro Nukaga	LDP	127,364	66.5	71,920	Yoshiharu Tokoi	DPJ	29.0	LDP hold
Ibaraki 3rd	Nobuyuki Hanashi	LDP	Yasuhiro Hanashi	LDP	102,315	48.9	10,009	Toshiaki Koizumi	DPJ	44.1	LDP hold
Ibaraki 4th	Hiroshi Kajiyama	LDP	Hiroshi Kajiyama	LDP	119,047	74.1	90,387	Shuichi Oshima	SDP	17.8	LDP hold
Ibaraki 5th	Akihiro Ohata	DPJ	Akihiro Ohata	DPJ	74,407	52.7	15,317	Hideaki Okabe	LDP	41.9	DPJ hold
Ibaraki 6th	Yuya Niwa	LDP	Yuya Niwa	LDP	130,525	58.6	55,610	Nobuaki Futami	DPJ	33.6	LDP hold
Ibaraki 7th	Yoji Nagaoka	LDP	Yoji Nagaoka	LDP	97,642	64.2	53,099	Hiroko Igarashi	DPJ	29.3	LDP hold
Tochigi 1st	Hiroko Mizushima	DPJ	Hajime Funada	LDP	123,297	53.1	21,170	Hiroko Mizushima	DPJ	44.0	LDP gain from DPJ
Tochigi 2nd	Koya Nishikawa	LDP	Mayumi Moriyama	LDP	96,224	59.5	36,214	Mamoru Kobayashi	DPJ	37.1	LDP hold
Tochigi 3rd	Yoshimi Watanabe	LDP	Yoshimi Watanabe	LDP	100,539	74.9	76,026	Shozo Maki	JCP	18.3	LDP hold
Tochigi 4th	Tsutomu Sato	LDP	Tsutomu Sato	LDP	125,031	52.8	20,872	Kenji Yamaoka	DPJ	43.9	LDP hold
Tochigi 5th	Toshimitsu Motegi	LDP	Toshimitsu Motegi	LDP	124,612	74.1	89,481	Hidenori Nakatsuka	DPJ	20.9	LDP hold
Gunma 1st	Genichiro Sata	LDP	Kōji Omi	LDP	130,242	60.5	61,282	Hitoshi Takahashi	DPJ	32.0	LDP hold
Gunma 2nd	Takashi Sasagawa	LDP	Takashi Sasagawa	LDP	76,779	43.4	19,448	Kei Ishizeki	DPJ	32.4	LDP hold
Gunma 3rd	Yoshio Yatsu	LDP	Yoshio Yatsu	LDP	91,330	54.9	24,243	Hiroyoshi Sasagawa	DPJ	40.3	LDP hold
Gunma 4th	Yasuo Fukuda	LDP	Yasuo Fukuda	LDP	98,903	62.1	50,476	Yukio Tomioka	DPJ	30.4	LDP hold
Gunma 5th	Yūko Obuchi	LDP	Yūko Obuchi	LDP	144,848	77.0	117,155	Masao Asagai	SDP	14.7	LDP hold
Saitama 1st	Koichi Takemasa	DPJ	Koichi Takemasa	DPJ	117,587	56.3	57,677	Zenjiro Kaneko	NCP	28.7	DPJ hold
Saitama 2nd	Yoshitaka Shindō	LDP	Katsuyuki Ishida	DPJ	114,322	51.0	23,227	Yoshitaka Shindō	LDP	40.6	DPJ gain from LDP
Saitama 3rd	Ritsuo Hosokawa	DPJ	Ritsuo Hosokawa	DPJ	104,182	46.5	594	Hiroshi Imai	LDP	46.3	DPJ hold
Saitama 4th	Vacant	DPJ	Hideo Jinpu	DPJ	81,367	48.0	11,742	Chuko Hayakawa	LDP	41.1	DPJ hold
Saitama 5th	Yukio Edano	DPJ	Yukio Edano	DPJ	95,626	56.4	35,216	Shumei Takahashi	LDP	35.6	DPJ hold
Saitama 6th	Atsushi Oshima	DPJ	Atsushi Oshima	DPJ	112,794	48.1	9,283	Kaneshige Wakamatsu	Komei	44.1	DPJ hold
Saitama 7th	Kiyoshi Nakano	LDP	Yasuko Komiyama	DPJ	97,353	46.8	9,202	Kiyoshi Nakano	LDP	42.4	DPJ gain from LDP
Saitama 8th	Atsushi Kinoshita	DPJ	Masanori Arai	LDP	70,959	39.1	1,541	Atsushi Kinoshita	DPJ	38.3	LDP gain from DPJ
Saitama 9th	Matsushige Ono	LDP	Matsushige Ono	LDP	104,167	48.4	8,598	Fumihiko Igarashi	DPJ	43.9	LDP hold
Saitama 10th	Taimei Yamaguchi	LDP	Taimei Yamaguchi	LDP	87,489	49.8	12,406	Tetsuhisa Matsuzaki	DPJ	42.8	LDP hold
Saitama 11th	Ryuji Koizumi	LDP	Ryuji Koizumi	LDP	123,057	63.9	70,328	Akiji Yagi	DPJ	37.4	LDP hold
Saitama 12th	Toshio Kojima	LDP	Toshio Masuda	LDP	95,889	51.7	20,450	Hiranao Honda	DPJ	40.7	LDP hold
Saitama 13th	Shinako Tsuchiya	LDP	Shinako Tsuchiya	LDP	81,935	43.2	574	Yuriko Takeyama	DPJ	42.9	LDP hold
Saitama 14th	Takashi Mitsubayashi	LDP	Takashi Mitsubayashi	LDP	104,066	50.3	17,240	Jou Nakano	DPJ	41.9	LDP hold
Saitama 15th	New seat		Satoshi Takayama	DPJ	80,745	46.3	22,223	Hikaru Matsunaga	LDP	33.6	DPJ win

Proportional representation results
Party	Votes	Seats	Rank	Elected member	Constituency	Ratio
DPJ	2,299,620 (37.9%)	8	1	Yuriko Takeyama	Saitama 13th	99.2%
DPJ	2,299,620 (37.9%)	8	1	Atsushi Kinoshita	Saitama 8th	97.8%
DPJ	2,299,620 (37.9%)	8	1	Fumihiko Igarashi	Saitama 9th	90.7%
DPJ	2,299,620 (37.9%)	8	1	Toshiaki Koizumi	Ibaraki 3rd	90.2%
DPJ	2,299,620 (37.9%)	8	1	Tetsuhisa Matsuzaki	Saitama 10th	85.8%
DPJ	2,299,620 (37.9%)	8	1	Jou Nakano	Saitama 14th	83.4%
DPJ	2,299,620 (37.9%)	8	1	Kenji Yamaoka	Tochigi 4th	83.3%
DPJ	2,299,620 (37.9%)	8	1	Hiroko Mizushima	Tochigi 1st	82.8%
LDP	2,275,223 (37.5%)	8	1	Genichiro Sata		
LDP	2,275,223 (37.5%)	8	2	Toshio Kojima		
LDP	2,275,223 (37.5%)	8	3	Koya Nishikawa		
LDP	2,275,223 (37.5%)	8	4	Susumu Hasumi		
LDP	2,275,223 (37.5%)	8	5	Shigeo Uetake		
LDP	2,275,223 (37.5%)	8	6	Hiroshi Imai	Saitama 3rd	99.4%
LDP	2,275,223 (37.5%)	8	6	Kiyoshi Nakano	Saitama 7th	90.5%
LDP	2,275,223 (37.5%)	8	6	Chuko Hayakawa	Saitama 4th	85.5%
Komei	857,490 (14.1%)	3	1	Keiichi Ishii		
Komei	857,490 (14.1%)	3	2	Otohiko Endō		
Komei	857,490 (14.1%)	3	3	Hiroaki Nagasawa		
JCP	402,849 (6.6%)	1	1	Tetsuya Shiokawa	Saitama 8th	26.0%

== Southern Kanto block ==
2003 Japanese general election in Southern Kanto
- 9 November 2003

All 56 seats to the House of Representatives
	Majority party	Minority party	Third party
Party	DPJ	LDP	Komei
Last election	21 seats	24 seats	3 seats
Constituency	17	16	1
PR seats	9	8	3
Total	26	24	4
Seat change	▲5	0	▲1
	Fourth party	Fifth party
Party	JCP	SDP
Last election	2 seats	2 seats
Constituency	0	0
PR seats	1	1
Total	1	1
Seat change	▼1	▼1

Single-member constituency results in Southern Kanto
Constituency	Previous member		Elected member		Votes	%	Margin	Runner-up		%	Status
Chiba 1st	Hideo Usui	LDP	Kaname Tajima	DPJ	100,838	49.2	10,965	Hideo Usui	LDP	43.9	DPJ gain from LDP
Chiba 2nd	Hisayasu Nagata	DPJ	Hisayasu Nagata	DPJ	111,539	48.4	17,922	Kazuo Eguchi	LDP	40.6	DPJ hold
Chiba 3rd	Hirokazu Matsuno	LDP	Kazumasa Okajima	DPJ	85,610	47.8	917	Hirokazu Matsuno	LDP	47.3	DPJ gain from LDP
Chiba 4th	Yoshihiko Noda	DPJ	Yoshihiko Noda	DPJ	135,522	55.8	55,471	Masaru Hasegawa	LDP	32.9	DPJ hold
Chiba 5th	Kou Tanaka	Ind.	Hirotami Murakoshi	DPJ	76,671	38.9	12,278	Kentaro Sonoura	LDP	32.7	DPJ gain from Ind.
Chiba 6th	Yukio Ubukata	DPJ	Yukio Ubukata	DPJ	83,985	46.8	4,824	Hiromichi Watanabe	LDP	44.1	DPJ hold
Chiba 7th	Kazuna Matsumoto	LDP	Akira Uchiyama	DPJ	96,915	48.0	13,016	Kazumi Matsumoto	LDP	41.6	DPJ gain from LDP
Chiba 8th	Hiroyuki Nagahama	DPJ	Kimiaki Matsuzaki	DPJ	100,794	46.8	5,167	Yoshitaka Sakurada	LDP	44.4	DPJ hold
Chiba 9th	Kenichi Mizuno	LDP	Kenichi Mizuno	LDP	103,199	49.3	14,142	Hiroshi Sudo	DPJ	42.6	LDP hold
Chiba 10th	Motoo Hayashi	LDP	Motoo Hayashi	LDP	94,946	43.6	12,996	Hajime Yatagawa	Ind.	37.6	LDP hold
Chiba 11th	Eisuke Mori	LDP	Eisuke Mori	LDP	130,863	63.1	70,567	Hiroyuki Nagahama	DPJ	29.1	LDP hold
Chiba 12th	Shozaburo Nakamura	LDP	Yasukazu Hamada	LDP	115,708	53.9	28,186	Ai Aoki	DPJ	40.8	LDP hold
Chiba 13th	New seat		Yukio Jitsukawa	LDP	81,625	48.3	5,698	Yasuhiko Wakai	DPJ	44.9	LDP win
Kanagawa 1st	Kenichiro Sato	DPJ	Jun Matsumoto	LDP	111,730	47.6	14,100	Kenichiro Sato	DPJ	41.6	LDP gain from DPJ
Kanagawa 2nd	Yoshihide Suga	LDP	Yoshihide Suga	LDP	115,495	49.8	22,089	Akira Oide	DPJ	40.3	LDP hold
Kanagawa 3rd	Hachiro Okonogi	LDP	Hachiro Okonogi	LDP	91,207	44.1	9,211	Naohiko Kato	DPJ	39.7	LDP hold
Kanagawa 4th	Hisako Ōishi	DPJ	Hisako Ōishi	DPJ	89,515	46.9	15,248	Jun Hayashi	LDP	38.9	DPJ hold
Kanagawa 5th	Keishu Tanaka	DPJ	Keishu Tanaka	DPJ	123,905	50.3	32,392	Manabu Sakai	LDP	37.2	DPJ hold
Kanagawa 6th	Motohisa Ikeda	DPJ	Isamu Ueda	Komei	82,269	36.7	896	Motohisa Ikeda	DPJ	36.5	Komei gain from DPJ
Kanagawa 7th	Tsuneo Suzuki	LDP	Nobuhiko Suto	DPJ	96,479	46.6	2,622	Tsuneo Suzuki	LDP	45.3	DPJ gain from LDP
Kanagawa 8th	Kenji Eda	Ind.	Tetsundo Iwakuni	DPJ	80,752	38.7	1,970	Kenji Eda	Ind.	37.7	DPJ gain from Ind.
Kanagawa 9th	Vacant	DPJ	Hirofumi Ryu	DPJ	78,590	50.3	21,133	Nakahama Taku	LDP	36.8	DPJ hold
Kanagawa 10th	Kazunori Tanaka	LDP	Kazunori Tanaka	LDP	114,766	48.1	25,014	Keikou Hakariya	DPJ	37.6	LDP hold
Kanagawa 11th	Junichiro Koizumi	LDP	Junichiro Koizumi	LDP	174,374	74.4	128,084	Yusuke Sawaki	DPJ	19.8	LDP hold
Kanagawa 12th	Yoichiro Esaki	LDP	Ikko Nakatsuka	DPJ	75,826	39.4	2,059	Ikuzo Sakurai	LDP	26.3	DPJ gain from LDP
Kanagawa 13th	Akira Amari	LDP	Akira Amari	LDP	139,236	56.8	52,980	Ryushi Tsuchida	DPJ	35.2	LDP hold
Kanagawa 14th	Hirohisa Fujii	DPJ	Hirohisa Fujii	DPJ	97,214	43.7	15,420	Taei Nakamoto	LDP	36.8	DPJ hold
Kanagawa 15th	Taro Kono	LDP	Taro Kono	LDP	148,955	59.9	71,988	Fumihiko Sakai	DPJ	30.9	LDP hold
Kanagawa 16th	Yoshiyuki Kamei	LDP	Yoshiyuki Kamei	LDP	125,067	55.4	42,100	Hidetomo Nagata	DPJ	36.7	LDP hold
Kanagawa 17th	Yōhei Kōno	LDP	Yōhei Kōno	LDP	135,206	57.3	53,306	Naoto Sakaguchi	DPJ	34.7	LDP hold
Kanagawa 18th	New seat		Takeshi Hidaka	DPJ	64,879	38.0	6,878	Daishiro Yamagiwa	LDP	33.9	DPJ win
Yamanashi 1st	Sakihito Ozawa	DPJ	Sakihito Ozawa	DPJ	71,623	54.9	26,341	Kenzo Yoneda	LDP	34.7	DPJ hold
Yamanashi 2nd	Mitsuo Horiuchi	LDP	Mitsuo Horiuchi	LDP	101,727	77.1	71,502	Hitoshi Hanada	JCP	22.9	LDP hold
Yamanashi 3rd	Takeshi Hosaka	LDP	Takeshi Hosaka	LDP	83,107	52.9	20,632	Hitoshi Goto	DPJ	39.8	LDP hold

Proportional representation results
Party	Votes	Seats	Rank	Elected member	Constituency	Ratio
DPJ	2,819,165 (40.0%)	9	2	Hiroyuki Nagahama	Chiba 11th	46.0%
DPJ	2,819,165 (40.0%)	9	3	Motohisa Ikeda	Kanagawa 6th	99.3%
DPJ	2,819,165 (40.0%)	9	3	Yasuhiko Wakai	Chiba 13th	93.0%
DPJ	2,819,165 (40.0%)	9	3	Naohiko Kato	Kanagawa 3rd	89.9%
DPJ	2,819,165 (40.0%)	9	3	Kenichiro Sato	Kanagawa 1st	87.3%
DPJ	2,819,165 (40.0%)	9	3	Hiroshi Sudo	Chiba 9th	86.2%
DPJ	2,819,165 (40.0%)	9	3	Akira Oide	Kanagawa 2nd	80.8%
DPJ	2,819,165 (40.0%)	9	3	Keikou Hakariya	Kanagawa 10th	78.2%
DPJ	2,819,165 (40.0%)	9	3	Ai Aoki	Chiba 12th	75.6%
LDP	2,441,590 (34.6%)	8	1	Shozaburo Nakamura		
LDP	2,441,590 (34.6%)	8	2	Yoichiro Esaki		
LDP	2,441,590 (34.6%)	8	3	Hirokazu Matsuno	Chiba 3rd	98.9%
LDP	2,441,590 (34.6%)	8	3	Ikuzo Sakurai	Kanagawa 12th	97.2%
LDP	2,441,590 (34.6%)	8	3	Tsuneo Suzuki	Kanagawa 7th	97.2%
LDP	2,441,590 (34.6%)	8	3	Yoshitaka Sakurada	Chiba 8th	94.8%
LDP	2,441,590 (34.6%)	8	3	Hiromichi Watanabe	Chiba 6th	94.2%
LDP	2,441,590 (34.6%)	8	3	Daishiro Yamagiwa	Kanagawa 18th	89.3%
Komei	969,464 (13.7%)	3	1	Nobuo Kawakami		
Komei	969,464 (13.7%)	3	2	Shigeyuki Tomita		
Komei	969,464 (13.7%)	3	3	Noriko Furuya		
JCP	521,309 (7.4%)	1	1	Kazuo Shii		
SDP	300,599 (4.3%)	1	1	Tomoko Abe	Kanagawa 12th	35.5%

== Tokyo block ==
2003 Japanese general election in Tokyo
- 9 November 2003

All 42 seats to the House of Representatives
	Majority party	Minority party	Third party
Party	DPJ	LDP	Komei
Last election	21 seats	12 seats	2 seats
Constituency	12	12	1
PR seats	8	6	2
Total	20	18	3
Seat change	▼1	▲6	▲1
	Fourth party	Fifth party	Sixth party
Party	JCP	SDP	NCP
Last election	2 seats	1 seat	1 seat
Constituency	0	0	0
PR seats	1	0	–
Total	1	0	0
Seat change	▼1	▼1	▼1
	Seventh party
Party	Ind.
Last election	3 seats
Constituency	0
PR seats	–
Total	0
Seat change	▼3

Single-member constituency results in Tokyo
Constituency	Previous member		Elected member		Votes	%	Margin	Runner-up		%	Status
Tokyo 1st	Banri Kaieda	DPJ	Banri Kaieda	DPJ	105,222	44.6	1,437	Kaoru Yosano	LDP	44.0	DPJ hold
Tokyo 2nd	Yoshikatsu Nakayama	DPJ	Yoshikatsu Nakayama	DPJ	104,477	48.0	12,551	Takashi Fukaya	LDP	42.2	DPJ hold
Tokyo 3rd	Jin Matsubara	DPJ	Jin Matsubara	DPJ	122,181	47.3	8,687	Hirotaka Ishihara	LDP	43.9	DPJ hold
Tokyo 4th	Kensaku Morita	LDP	Kazuyoshi Nakanishi	LDP	90,693	41.4	12,740	Noboru Usami	DPJ	35.5	LDP hold
Tokyo 5th	Yoshio Tezuka	DPJ	Yoshio Tezuka	DPJ	107,110	44.1	7,492	Takashi Kosugi	LDP	41.0	DPJ hold
Tokyo 6th	Yoko Komiyama	DPJ	Yoko Komiyama	DPJ	131,715	52.2	53,065	Takao Ochi	LDP	31.2	DPJ hold
Tokyo 7th	Akira Nagatsuma	DPJ	Akira Nagatsuma	DPJ	99,891	43.1	16,303	Fumiaki Matsumoto	LDP	36.0	DPJ hold
Tokyo 8th	Nobuteru Ishihara	LDP	Nobuteru Ishihara	LDP	136,429	55.0	58,422	Morio Suzuki	DPJ	31.4	LDP hold
Tokyo 9th	Koichi Yoshida	DPJ	Isshu Sugawara	LDP	112,868	45.8	16,206	Koichi Yoshida	DPJ	39.2	LDP gain from DPJ
Tokyo 10th	Kōki Kobayashi	LDP	Kōki Kobayashi	LDP	81,979	45.2	4,562	Muneaki Samejima	DPJ	42.7	LDP hold
Tokyo 11th	Hakubun Shimomura	LDP	Hakubun Shimomura	LDP	113,477	48.9	26,146	Koichiro Watanabe	DPJ	37.7	LDP hold
Tokyo 12th	Eita Yashiro	LDP	Akihiro Ota	Komei	98,700	44.1	3,590	Yukihisa Fujita	DPJ	42.4	Komei gain from LDP
Tokyo 13th	Ichirō Kamoshita	LDP	Koriki Jojima	DPJ	90,277	43.6	2,023	Ichirō Kamoshita	LDP	42.6	DPJ gain from LDP
Tokyo 14th	Taiichirō Nishikawa	NCP	Midori Matsushima	LDP	66,417	34.3	3,032	Kazuo Inoue	DPJ	32.8	LDP gain from NCP
Tokyo 15th	Koji Kakizawa	IA	Ben Kimura	LDP	69,164	35.4	10,548	Shozo Azuma	DPJ	30.0	LDP gain from IA
Tokyo 16th	Yoshio Udagawa	IA	Yoshinobu Shimamura	LDP	80,015	35.3	9,826	Hirosato Nakatsugawa	DPJ	31.0	LDP gain from IA
Tokyo 17th	Katsuei Hirasawa	LDP	Katsuei Hirasawa	LDP	142,916	62.0	77,647	Atsushi Nishikori	DPJ	28.3	LDP hold
Tokyo 18th	Naoto Kan	DPJ	Naoto Kan	DPJ	139,195	58.4	55,858	Kunio Hatoyama	LDP	34.9	DPJ hold
Tokyo 19th	Yoshinori Suematsu	DPJ	Yoshinori Suematsu	DPJ	136,082	52.9	47,581	Yohei Matsumoto	LDP	34.4	DPJ hold
Tokyo 20th	Koichi Kato	DPJ	Koichi Kato	DPJ	111,041	50.7	29,453	Seiichiro Shimizu	LDP	37.2	DPJ hold
Tokyo 21st	Etsuko Kawada	Ind.	Akihisa Nagashima	DPJ	81,398	39.2	9,525	Joji Hashimoto	LDP	34.6	DPJ gain from Ind.
Tokyo 22nd	Ikuo Yamahana	DPJ	Ikuo Yamahana	DPJ	113,931	45.9	8,546	Tatsuya Ito	LDP	42.5	DPJ hold
Tokyo 23rd	Kosuke Ito	LDP	Kosuke Ito	LDP	126,221	48.5	15,955	Eiko Ishige	DPJ	42.3	LDP hold
Tokyo 24th	Yukihiko Akutsu	DPJ	Kōichi Hagiuda	LDP	108,843	44.3	2,110	Yukihiko Akutsu	DPJ	43.4	LDP gain from DPJ
Tokyo 25th	Yozo Ishikawa	LDP	Shinji Inoue	LDP	80,443	46.3	9,292	Hisashi Shimada	DPJ	40.9	LDP hold

Proportional representation results
Party	Votes	Seats	Rank	Elected member	Constituency	Ratio
DPJ	2,291,124 (39.9%)	8	1	Yukihiko Akutsu	Tokyo 24th	98.0%
DPJ	2,291,124 (39.9%)	8	1	Yukihisa Fujita	Tokyo 12th	96.3%
DPJ	2,291,124 (39.9%)	8	1	Kazuo Inoue	Tokyo 14th	95.4%
DPJ	2,291,124 (39.9%)	8	1	Muneaki Samejima	Tokyo 10th	94.4%
DPJ	2,291,124 (39.9%)	8	1	Hisashi Shimada	Tokyo 25th	88.4%
DPJ	2,291,124 (39.9%)	8	1	Hirosato Nakatsugawa	Tokyo 16th	87.7%
DPJ	2,291,124 (39.9%)	8	1	Eiko Ishige	Tokyo 23rd	87.4%
DPJ	2,291,124 (39.9%)	8	1	Noboru Usami	Tokyo 4th	85.9%
LDP	1,867,544 (32.5%)	6	1	Eita Yashiro		
LDP	1,867,544 (32.5%)	6	2	Kunio Hatoyama	Tokyo 18th	59.8%
LDP	1,867,544 (32.5%)	6	3	Tatsuya Ito	Tokyo 22nd	92.4%
LDP	1,867,544 (32.5%)	6	4	Kaoru Yosano	Tokyo 1st	98.6%
LDP	1,867,544 (32.5%)	6	4	Ichirō Kamoshita	Tokyo 13th	97.7%
LDP	1,867,544 (32.5%)	6	4	Takashi Kosugi	Tokyo 5th	93.0%
Komei	805,640 (14.0%)	2	1	Yōsuke Takagi		
Komei	805,640 (14.0%)	2	2	Michiyo Takagi		
JCP	532,376 (7.3%)	1	1	Tomio Yamaguchi	Tokyo 4th	26.3%

== Hokuriku-Shin'etsu block ==
2003 Japanese general election in Hokuriku-Shin'etsu
- 9 November 2003

All 31 seats to the House of Representatives
	Majority party	Minority party	Third party
Party	LDP	DPJ	Komei
Last election	20 seats	7 seats	1 seat
Constituency	13	6	0
PR seats	5	5	1
Total	18	11	1
Seat change	▼2	▲4	0
	Fourth party	Fifth party	Sixth party
Party	Ind.	SDP	JCP
Last election	1 seat	1 seat	1 seat
Constituency	1	0	0
PR seats	–	0	0
Total	1	0	0
Seat change	0	▼1	▼1

Single-member constituency results in Hokuriku-Shin'etsu
Constituency	Previous member		Elected member		Votes	%	Margin	Runner-up		%	Status
Niigata 1st	Rokuzaemon Yoshida	LDP	Chinami Nishimura	DPJ	119,297	51.1	23,190	Rokuzaemon Yoshida	LDP	41.2	DPJ gain from LDP
Niigata 2nd	Motohiko Kondo	LDP	Motohiko Kondo	LDP	95,391	43.9	39,389	Masayuki Fujishima	Ind.	25.8	LDP hold
Niigata 3rd	Yamato Inaba	LDP	Yamato Inaba	LDP	108,627	55.9	38,371	Hachirou Kuramochi	SDP	36.2	LDP hold
Niigata 4th	Hirohisa Kurihara	LDP	Makiko Kikuta	DPJ	113,271	53.4	29,391	Hirohisa Kurihara	LDP	39.6	DPJ gain from LDP
Niigata 5th	Yukio Hoshino	LDP	Makiko Tanaka	Ind.	98,112	49.1	36,175	Yukio Hoshino	LDP	31.0	Ind. gain from LDP
Niigata 6th	Nobutaka Tsutsui	DPJ	Nobutaka Tsutsui	DPJ	89,693	40.6	25,111	Shuichi Takatori	LDP	29.3	DPJ hold
Toyama 1st	Jinen Nagase	LDP	Jinen Nagase	LDP	76,154	55.5	24,848	Muneaki Murai	DPJ	37.4	LDP hold
Toyama 2nd	Mitsuhiro Miyakoshi	LDP	Mitsuhiro Miyakoshi	LDP	93,849	59.4	51,605	Masaei Nishio	DPJ	26.8	LDP hold
Toyama 3rd	Tamisuke Watanuki	LDP	Tamisuke Watanuki	LDP	159,316	69.7	107,653	Masato Kubota	SDP	22.6	LDP hold
Ishikawa 1st	Hiroshi Hase	LDP	Ken Okuda	DPJ	99,868	48.1	2,793	Hiroshi Hase	LDP	46.8	DPJ gain from LDP
Ishikawa 2nd	Yoshirō Mori	LDP	Yoshirō Mori	LDP	114,541	55.6	32,472	Yasuo Ichikawa	DPJ	39.8	LDP hold
Ishikawa 3rd	Riki Kawara	LDP	Riki Kawara	LDP	102,864	58.1	36,624	Yutaka Kuwabara	DPJ	37.4	LDP hold
Fukui 1st	Isao Matsumiya	LDP	Isao Matsumiya	LDP	55,698	42.1	1,679	Ryuzo Sasaki	Ind.	40.8	LDP hold
Fukui 2nd	Takamori Makino	LDP	Taku Yamamoto	LDP	62,558	44.1	19,415	Seizō Wakaizumi	DPJ	30.4	LDP hold
Fukui 3rd	Tsuyoshi Takagi	LDP	Tsuyoshi Takagi	LDP	85,113	59.8	35,718	Kazuo Tamamura	DPJ	34.7	LDP hold
Nagano 1st	Kenji Kosaka	LDP	Kenji Kosaka	LDP	118,065	45.0	6,244	Takashi Shinohara	DPJ	42.6	LDP hold
Nagano 2nd	Jin Murai	LDP	Mitsu Shimojo	DPJ	108,397	43.0	9,641	Jin Murai	LDP	39.2	DPJ gain from LDP
Nagano 3rd	Tsutomu Hata	DPJ	Tsutomu Hata	DPJ	150,203	58.5	71,839	Tadao Iwasaki	LDP	30.5	DPJ hold
Nagano 4th	Shigeyuki Goto	LDP	Shigeyuki Goto	LDP	70,618	43.4	19,967	Ikuo Horigome	DPJ	31.1	LDP hold
Nagano 5th	Sohei Miyashita	LDP	Ichiro Miyashita	LDP	108,567	52.7	38,060	Takashi Kato	DPJ	34.2	LDP hold

Proportional representation results
Party	Votes	Seats	Rank	Elected member	Constituency	Ratio
LDP	1,502,822 (38.9%)	5	1	Kyogon Hagiyama		
LDP	1,502,822 (38.9%)	5	2	Kotaro Tachibana		
LDP	1,502,822 (38.9%)	5	3	Tadao Iwasaki	Nagano 3rd	52.1%
LDP	1,502,822 (38.9%)	5	4	Hiroshi Hase	Ishikawa 1st	97.2%
LDP	1,502,822 (38.9%)	5	4	Jin Murai	Nagano 2nd	91.1%
DPJ	1,424,537 (36.9%)	5	1	Takashi Shinohara	Nagano 1st	94.7%
DPJ	1,424,537 (36.9%)	5	1	Ikuo Horigome	Nagano 4th	71.7%
DPJ	1,424,537 (36.9%)	5	1	Yasuo Ichikawa	Ishikawa 2nd	71.6%
DPJ	1,424,537 (36.9%)	5	1	Seizō Wakaizumi	Fukui 2nd	68.9%
DPJ	1,424,537 (36.9%)	5	1	Muneaki Murai	Toyama 1st	67.3%
Komei	390,921 (10.1%)	1	3	Yoshio Urushibara		

== Tokai block ==
2003 Japanese general election in Tokai
- 9 November 2003

All 54 seats to the House of Representatives
	Majority party	Minority party	Third party
Party	DPJ	LDP	Komei
Last election	24 seats	23 seats	2 seats
Constituency	15	15	0
PR seats	9	8	3
Total	24	23	3
Seat change	0	0	▲1
	Fourth party	Fifth party	Sixth party
Party	NCP	JCP	SDP
Last election	1 seat	2 seats	1 seat
Constituency	2	0	0
PR seats	–	1	0
Total	2	1	0
Seat change	▲1	▼1	▼1
	Seventh party
Party	Ind.
Last election	2 seats
Constituency	1
PR seats	–
Total	1
Seat change	▼1

Single-member constituency results in Tokai
Constituency	Previous member		Elected member		Votes	%	Margin	Runner-up		%	Status
Gifu 1st	Seiko Noda	LDP	Seiko Noda	LDP	92,717	51.4	21,068	Makoto Asano	DPJ	39.7	LDP hold
Gifu 2nd	Yasufumi Tanahashi	LDP	Yasufumi Tanahashi	LDP	118,748	61.6	58,630	Rina Ooishi	DPJ	31.2	LDP hold
Gifu 3rd	Kabun Mutō	LDP	Kabun Mutō	LDP	115,221	47.8	4,425	Yasuhiro Sonoda	DPJ	45.9	LDP hold
Gifu 4th	Kazuyoshi Kaneko	LDP	Takao Fujii	LDP	156,179	63.8	80,939	Ryoji Yamada	DPJ	30.7	LDP hold
Gifu 5th	Keiji Furuya	LDP	Keiji Furuya	LDP	110,553	57.3	43,007	Norio Takeda	DPJ	35.0	LDP hold
Shizuoka 1st	Yōko Kamikawa	LDP	Seishu Makino	DPJ	74,745	33.5	7,308	Yōko Kamikawa	LDP	30.2	DPJ gain from LDP
Shizuoka 2nd	Shozo Harada	LDP	Yoshitsugu Harada	LDP	129,162	51.5	21,475	Shogo Tsugawa	DPJ	42.9	LDP hold
Shizuoka 3rd	Hakuo Yanagisawa	LDP	Hakuo Yanagisawa	LDP	138,508	59.7	57,144	Yasushi Suzuki	DPJ	35.1	LDP hold
Shizuoka 4th	Yoshio Mochizuki	LDP	Yoshio Mochizuki	LDP	102,761	53.1	25,896	Kenji Tamura	DPJ	39.7	LDP hold
Shizuoka 5th	Toshitsugu Saito	LDP	Goshi Hosono	DPJ	137,201	49.4	7,213	Toshitsugu Saito	LDP	26.8	DPJ gain from LDP
Shizuoka 6th	Shu Watanabe	DPJ	Shu Watanabe	DPJ	136,066	49.9	35,111	Hiroyasu Kurihara	LDP	37.0	DPJ hold
Shizuoka 7th	Goshi Hosono	DPJ	Minoru Kiuchi	Ind.	98,877	46.8	39,945	Hiroshi Kumagai	NCP	27.9	Ind. gain from DPJ
Shizuoka 8th	Yasutomo Suzuki	DPJ	Ryū Shionoya	LDP	104,046	47.4	2,562	Yasutomo Suzuki	DPJ	46.2	LDP gain from DPJ
Shizuoka 9th	Hiroshi Kumagai	NCP	Seat abolished								NCP loss
Aichi 1st	Takashi Kawamura	DPJ	Takashi Kawamura	DPJ	97,617	54.2	32,649	Takehiko Tanida	LDP	36.1	DPJ hold
Aichi 2nd	Motohisa Furukawa	DPJ	Motohisa Furukawa	DPJ	115,674	61.0	59,202	Yukio Saito	LDP	29.7	DPJ hold
Aichi 3rd	Shoichi Kondo	DPJ	Shoichi Kondo	DPJ	105,017	53.7	32,982	Yukihiro Yoshida	LDP	36.8	DPJ hold
Aichi 4th	Yoshio Maki	DPJ	Yoshio Maki	DPJ	84,919	44.0	5,170	Hiroshi Kondo	LDP	41.4	DPJ hold
Aichi 5th	Hirotaka Akamatsu	DPJ	Hirotaka Akamatsu	DPJ	104,346	49.4	13,678	Takahide Kimura	LDP	42.9	DPJ hold
Aichi 6th	Yukichi Maeda	DPJ	Yukichi Maeda	DPJ	97,776	44.2	17,076	Hideki Niwa	LDP	36.5	DPJ hold
Aichi 7th	Kenji Kobayashi	DPJ	Kenji Kobayashi	DPJ	102,710	44.1	8,828	Takashi Aoyama	LDP	40.3	DPJ hold
Aichi 8th	Hiroshi Oki	LDP	Yutaka Banno	DPJ	127,411	54.0	35,166	Hiroshi Oki	LDP	39.1	DPJ gain from LDP
Aichi 9th	Toshiki Kaifu	NCP	Toshiki Kaifu	NCP	104,075	44.6	11,521	Mitsunori Okamoto	DPJ	39.7	NCP hold
Aichi 10th	Kanju Sato	DPJ	Tetsuma Esaki	NCP	107,369	45.6	770	Kanju Sato	DPJ	45.3	NCP gain from DPJ
Aichi 11th	Eisei Ito	DPJ	Shinichiro Furumoto	DPJ	181,747	89.6	160,568	Shingo Kushida	JCP	10.4	DPJ hold
Aichi 12th	Seiken Sugiura	LDP	Seiken Sugiura	LDP	135,622	50.4	18,211	Yasuhiro Nakane	DPJ	43.6	LDP hold
Aichi 13th	Hideaki Ōmura	LDP	Hideaki Ōmura	LDP	114,092	48.4	4,422	Satoshi Shima	DPJ	46.6	LDP hold
Aichi 14th	Katsuhito Asano	LDP	Katsumasa Suzuki	DPJ	91,713	52.0	15,694	Katsuhito Asano	LDP	43.1	DPJ gain from LDP
Aichi 15th	Akihiko Yamamoto	LDP	Akihiko Yamamoto	LDP	100,443	50.3	15,870	Yuzuru Tsuzuki	DPJ	42.4	LDP hold
Mie 1st	Jirō Kawasaki	LDP	Jirō Kawasaki	LDP	101,911	50.1	11,530	Hiroshi Nakai	DPJ	44.4	LDP hold
Mie 2nd	Masaharu Nakagawa	DPJ	Masaharu Nakagawa	DPJ	123,449	69.2	81,019	Hisashi Ido	LDP	23.8	DPJ hold
Mie 3rd	Katsuya Okada	DPJ	Katsuya Okada	DPJ	132,109	62.0	64,862	Koichi Hirata	LDP	31.6	DPJ hold
Mie 4th	Norihisa Tamura	LDP	Norihisa Tamura	LDP	94,379	60.4	43,211	Chuji Ito	DPJ	32.7	LDP hold
Mie 5th	Takao Fujinami	Ind.	Norio Mitsuya	LDP	111,840	57.7	39,903	Yoichi Kaneko	DPJ	37.1	LDP gain from Ind.

Proportional representation results
Party	Votes	Seats	Rank	Elected member	Constituency	Ratio
DPJ	2,872,501 (40.8%)	9	1	Yuzuru Tsuzuki	Aichi 15th	84.1%
DPJ	2,872,501 (40.8%)	9	1	Chuji Ito	Mie 4th	54.2%
DPJ	2,872,501 (40.8%)	9	3	Kanju Sato	Aichi 10th	99.2%
DPJ	2,872,501 (40.8%)	9	3	Yasutomo Suzuki	Shizuoka 8th	97.5%
DPJ	2,872,501 (40.8%)	9	3	Yasuhiro Sonoda	Gifu 3rd	96.1%
DPJ	2,872,501 (40.8%)	9	3	Satoshi Shima	Aichi 13th	96.1%
DPJ	2,872,501 (40.8%)	9	3	Mitsunori Okamoto	Aichi 9th	88.9%
DPJ	2,872,501 (40.8%)	9	3	Hiroshi Nakai	Mie 1st	88.6%
DPJ	2,872,501 (40.8%)	9	3	Yasuhiro Nakane	Aichi 12th	86.5%
LDP	2,436,791 (34.6%)	8	1	Kazuyoshi Kaneko		
LDP	2,436,791 (34.6%)	8	2	Masatoshi Kurata		
LDP	2,436,791 (34.6%)	8	3	Junji Suzuki		
LDP	2,436,791 (34.6%)	8	4	Koichi Hirata	Mie 3rd	50.9%
LDP	2,436,791 (34.6%)	8	5	Toshitsugu Saito	Shizuoka 5th	94.7%
LDP	2,436,791 (34.6%)	8	5	Hiroshi Kondo	Aichi 4th	93.9%
LDP	2,436,791 (34.6%)	8	5	Takashi Aoyama	Aichi 7th	91.4%
LDP	2,436,791 (34.6%)	8	5	Yōko Kamikawa	Shizuoka 1st	90.2%
Komei	1,002,576 (14.2%)	3	1	Chikara Sakaguchi		
Komei	1,002,576 (14.2%)	3	2	Masatomo Kawai		
Komei	1,002,576 (14.2%)	3	3	Yoshinori Oguchi		
JCP	474,414 (6.7%)	1	1	Kensho Sasaki		

== Kinki block ==
2003 Japanese general election in Kinki
- 9 November 2003

All 77 seats to the House of Representatives
	Majority party	Minority party	Third party
Party	DPJ	LDP	Komei
Last election	20 seats	30 seats	11 seats
Constituency	20	19	6
PR seats	11	9	5
Total	31	28	11
Seat change	▲11	▼2	0
	Fourth party	Fifth party	Sixth party
Party	JCP	NCP	SDP
Last election	5 seats	4 seats	5 seats
Constituency	0	2	0
PR seats	3	–	1
Total	3	2	1
Seat change	▼2	▼2	▼4
	Seventh party
Party	Ind.
Last election	2 seats
Constituency	1
PR seats	–
Total	1
Seat change	▼1

Single-member constituency results in Kinki
Constituency	Previous member		Elected member		Votes	%	Margin	Runner-up		%	Status
Shiga 1st	Tatsuo Kawabata	DPJ	Tatsuo Kawabata	DPJ	87,857	51.0	23,855	Kenichiro Ueno	LDP	37.2	DPJ hold
Shiga 2nd	Osamu Konishi	LDP	Issei Tajima	DPJ	69,620	44.9	4,587	Osamu Konishi	LDP	41.9	DPJ gain from LDP
Shiga 3rd	Mineichi Iwanaga	LDP	Taizō Mikazuki	DPJ	64,225	48.0	6,493	Osamu Uno	LDP	43.2	DPJ gain from LDP
Shiga 4th	New seat		Mineichi Iwanaga	LDP	83,149	46.8	4,195	Tenzo Okumura	DPJ	44.5	LDP win
Kyoto 1st	Bunmei Ibuki	LDP	Bunmei Ibuki	LDP	83,644	42.3	20,157	Kazuya Tamaki	DPJ	32.1	LDP hold
Kyoto 2nd	Seiji Maehara	DPJ	Seiji Maehara	DPJ	73,934	49.7	25,972	Naohiko Yamamoto	LDP	32.3	DPJ hold
Kyoto 3rd	Shigehiko Okuyama	LDP	Kenta Izumi	DPJ	84,052	46.8	19,326	Shigehiko Okuyama	LDP	36.0	DPJ gain from LDP
Kyoto 4th	Hiromu Nonaka	LDP	Hideo Tanaka	LDP	108,209	49.7	35,544	Keiro Kitagami	DPJ	33.4	LDP hold
Kyoto 5th	Sadakazu Tanigaki	LDP	Sadakazu Tanigaki	LDP	103,486	62.9	66,784	Tetsuya Kobayashi	DPJ	22.3	LDP hold
Kyoto 6th	Yoshiaki Hishida	LDP	Kazunori Yamanoi	DPJ	117,467	46.9	16,926	Yoshiaki Hishida	LDP	40.1	DPJ gain from LDP
Osaka 1st	Kōki Chūma	LDP	Kōki Chūma	LDP	87,936	49.8	23,616	Atsushi Kumada	DPJ	36.4	LDP hold
Osaka 2nd	Megumu Sato	LDP	Megumu Sato	LDP	96,470	50.8	39,818	Kaoru Iwanami	DPJ	29.8	LDP hold
Osaka 3rd	Masahiro Tabata	Komei	Masahiro Tabata	Komei	97,552	46.3	18,013	Megumu Tsuji	DPJ	37.8	Komei hold
Osaka 4th	Masaaki Nakayama	LDP	Osamu Yoshida	DPJ	92,470	44.8	5,283	Yasuhide Nakayama	LDP	42.2	DPJ gain from LDP
Osaka 5th	Takayoshi Taniguchi	Komei	Takayoshi Taniguchi	Komei	92,350	42.9	7,016	Tetsuo Inami	DPJ	39.6	Komei hold
Osaka 6th	Yutaka Fukushima	Komei	Yutaka Fukushima	Komei	101,292	49.4	26,194	Fumiyoshi Murakami	DPJ	36.6	Komei hold
Osaka 7th	Osamu Fujimura	DPJ	Osamu Fujimura	DPJ	72,643	39.2	17,409	Issei Inoue	LDP	29.8	DPJ hold
Osaka 8th	Kansei Nakano	DPJ	Kansei Nakano	DPJ	81,319	48.6	17,995	Takashi Ōtsuka	LDP	37.8	DPJ hold
Osaka 9th	Nobumori Otani	DPJ	Nobumori Otani	DPJ	97,572	41.9	3,910	Takeshi Nishida	LDP	40.2	DPJ hold
Osaka 10th	Kenta Matsunami	LDP	Miyoko Hida	DPJ	83,077	47.1	14,431	Kenta Matsunami	LDP	38.9	DPJ gain from LDP
Osaka 11th	Hirofumi Hirano	DPJ	Hirofumi Hirano	DPJ	116,834	58.3	68,999	Masumi Ogawa	Ind.	23.6	DPJ hold
Osaka 12th	Shinji Tarutoko	DPJ	Shinji Tarutoko	DPJ	82,190	44.6	920	Tomokatsu Kitagawa	LDP	44.1	DPJ hold
Osaka 13th	Masajuro Shiokawa	LDP	Akira Nishino	LDP	97,311	49.7	32,147	Junichiro Okamoto	DPJ	33.3	LDP hold
Osaka 14th	Takashi Tanihata	LDP	Takashi Tanihata	LDP	111,543	50.4	32,888	Takashi Nagao	DPJ	35.5	LDP hold
Osaka 15th	Naokazu Takemoto	LDP	Naokazu Takemoto	LDP	107,323	49.7	27,493	Kikuo Umegawa	DPJ	37.0	LDP hold
Osaka 16th	Kazuo Kitagawa	Komei	Kazuo Kitagawa	Komei	74,718	46.1	10,851	Yoshikazu Tarui	DPJ	39.4	Komei hold
Osaka 17th	Nobuko Okashita	LDP	Shingo Nishimura	DPJ	69,861	40.3	17,603	Nobuko Okashita	LDP	30.2	DPJ gain from LDP
Osaka 18th	Taro Nakayama	LDP	Taro Nakayama	LDP	108,996	47.9	19,066	Osamu Nakagawa	DPJ	39.6	LDP hold
Osaka 19th	Kenshiro Matsunami	NCP	Takashi Nagayasu	DPJ	75,369	47.2	33,085	Kenshiro Matsunami	NCP	36.5	DPJ gain from NCP
Hyogo 1st	Hajime Ishii	DPJ	Keisuke Sunada	LDP	71,587	38.7	795	Hajime Ishii	DPJ	38.3	LDP gain from DPJ
Hyogo 2nd	Kazuyoshi Akaba	Komei	Kazuyoshi Akaba	Komei	83,379	43.2	3,318	Fusaho Izumi	DPJ	41.5	Komei hold
Hyogo 3rd	Ryuichi Doi	DPJ	Ryuichi Doi	DPJ	88,767	51.1	27,504	Hiromitsu Ikawa	LDP	35.3	DPJ hold
Hyogo 4th	Kiichi Inoue	NCP	Kiichi Inoue	NCP	127,330	55.4	45,421	Shoichi Takahashi	DPJ	35.6	NCP hold
Hyogo 5th	Yoichi Tani	LDP	Yoichi Tani	LDP	112,437	47.6	3,586	Yasuhiro Kajiwara	DPJ	46.0	LDP hold
Hyogo 6th	Yuriko Koike	LDP	Koichiro Ichimura	DPJ	109,320	42.7	12,910	Yoshihide Sakaue	LDP	37.6	DPJ gain from LDP
Hyogo 7th	Takako Doi	SDP	Shigeo Omae	LDP	111,216	47.1	24,812	Takako Doi	SDP	40.8	LDP gain from SDP
Hyogo 8th	Tetsuzo Fuyushiba	Komei	Tetsuzo Fuyushiba	Komei	94,406	44.1	14,914	Kunihiko Muroi	DPJ	37.1	Komei hold
Hyogo 9th	Ichizo Miyamoto	LDP	Yasutoshi Nishimura	Ind.	86,631	40.8	21,257	Ichizo Miyamoto	LDP	30.8	Ind. gain from LDP
Hyogo 10th	Kisaburo Tokai	LDP	Kisaburo Tokai	LDP	97,196	51.3	20,187	Yasuhiro Okada	DPJ	40.7	LDP hold
Hyogo 11th	Takeaki Matsumoto	DPJ	Takeaki Matsumoto	DPJ	112,898	52.6	23,739	Tōru Toida	LDP	41.6	DPJ hold
Hyogo 12th	Tsuyoshi Yamaguchi	IA	Saburo Komoto	LDP	108,479	49.1	4,631	Tsuyoshi Yamaguchi	IA	47.0	LDP gain from IA
Nara 1st	Masahiro Morioka	LDP	Sumio Mabuchi	DPJ	79,529	48.2	13,991	Sanae Takaichi	LDP	39.7	DPJ gain from LDP
Nara 2nd	Makoto Taki	LDP	Tetsuji Nakamura	DPJ	83,168	48.4	9,522	Makoto Taki	LDP	42.9	DPJ gain from LDP
Nara 3rd	Seisuke Okuno	LDP	Shinsuke Okuno	LDP	81,345	47.6	23,123	Tomomi Fukuoka	DPJ	34.1	LDP hold
Nara 4th	Ryotaro Tanose	LDP	Ryotaro Tanose	LDP	112,714	65.4	63,637	Naoko Yamamoto	DPJ	28.5	LDP hold
Wakayama 1st	Tatsuya Tanimoto	LDP	Tatsuya Tanimoto	LDP	101,602	68.9	55,751	Tsutomu Shimokado	JCP	31.1	LDP hold
Wakayama 2nd	Masatoshi Ishida	LDP	Masatoshi Ishida	LDP	77,102	51.0	13,957	Takeshi Kishimoto	DPJ	41.7	LDP hold
Wakayama 3rd	Toshihiro Nikai	NCP	Toshihiro Nikai	NCP	148,274	78.4	107,344	Minoru Ueda	JCP	21.6	NCP hold

Proportional representation results
Party	Votes	Seats	Rank	Elected member	Constituency	Ratio
DPJ	3,425,342 (37.1%)	11	1	Kazuya Tamaki	Kyoto 1st	75.9%
DPJ	3,425,342 (37.1%)	11	2	Hajime Ishii	Hyogo 1st	98.8%
DPJ	3,425,342 (37.1%)	11	2	Yasuhiro Kajiwara	Hyogo 5th	96.8%
DPJ	3,425,342 (37.1%)	11	2	Fusaho Izumi	Hyogo 2nd	96.0%
DPJ	3,425,342 (37.1%)	11	2	Tenzo Okumura	Shiga 4th	94.9%
DPJ	3,425,342 (37.1%)	11	2	Tetsuo Inami	Osaka 5th	92.4%
DPJ	3,425,342 (37.1%)	11	2	Yoshikazu Tarui	Osaka 16th	85.4%
DPJ	3,425,342 (37.1%)	11	2	Kunihiko Muroi	Hyogo 8th	84.2%
DPJ	3,425,342 (37.1%)	11	2	Osamu Nakagawa	Osaka 18th	82.5%
DPJ	3,425,342 (37.1%)	11	2	Takeshi Kishimoto	Wakayama 2nd	81.8%
DPJ	3,425,342 (37.1%)	11	2	Megumu Tsuji	Osaka 3rd	81.5%
LDP	2,833,181 (30.7%)	9	1	Takuji Yanagimoto		
LDP	2,833,181 (30.7%)	9	2	Masahiro Morioka		
LDP	2,833,181 (30.7%)	9	3	Yuriko Koike		
LDP	2,833,181 (30.7%)	9	4	Tomokatsu Kitagawa	Osaka 12th	98.8%
LDP	2,833,181 (30.7%)	9	4	Takeshi Nishida	Osaka 9th	95.9%
LDP	2,833,181 (30.7%)	9	4	Yasuhide Nakayama	Osaka 4th	94.2%
LDP	2,833,181 (30.7%)	9	4	Osamu Konishi	Shiga 2nd	93.4%
LDP	2,833,181 (30.7%)	9	4	Osamu Uno	Shiga 3rd	89.8%
LDP	2,833,181 (30.7%)	9	4	Makoto Taki	Nara 2nd	88.5%
Komei	1,604,469 (17.4%)	5	1	Yasuko Ikenobō		
Komei	1,604,469 (17.4%)	5	2	Masao Akamatsu		
Komei	1,604,469 (17.4%)	5	3	Hiroyoshi Nishi		
Komei	1,604,469 (17.4%)	5	4	Shigeki Sato		
Komei	1,604,469 (17.4%)	5	5	Yasuhide Yamana		
JCP	992,142 (10.7%)	3	1	Ikuko Ishii	Osaka 2nd	38.0%
JCP	992,142 (10.7%)	3	2	Keiji Kokuta	Kyoto 1st	60.6%
JCP	992,142 (10.7%)	3	3	Hidekatsu Yoshii	Osaka 13th	34.3%
SDP	375,228 (3.1%)	1	1	Takako Doi	Hyogo 7th	86.6%

== Chugoku block ==
2003 Japanese general election in Chugoku
- 9 November 2003

All 31 seats to the House of Representatives
	Majority party	Minority party	Third party
Party	LDP	DPJ	Komei
Last election	22 seats	3 seats	2 seats
Constituency	17	2	0
PR seats	5	4	2
Total	22	6	2
Seat change	0	▲3	0
	Fourth party	Fifth party	Sixth party
Party	JCP	SDP	IA
Last election	1 seat	1 seat	1 seat
Constituency	0	0	0
PR seats	0	0	–
Total	0	0	0
Seat change	▼1	▼1	▼1
	Seventh party
Party	Ind.
Last election	1 seat
Constituency	1
PR seats	–
Total	1
Seat change	0

Single-member constituency results in Chugoku
Constituency	Previous member		Elected member		Votes	%	Margin	Runner-up		%	Status
Tottori 1st	Shigeru Ishiba	LDP	Shigeru Ishiba	LDP	114,283	71.6	83,047	Kiyoichi Tanaka	SDP	19.6	LDP hold
Tottori 2nd	Hideyuki Aizawa	LDP	Yoshihiro Kawakami	Ind.	52,466	33.1	1,477	Osamu Yamauchi	DPJ	32.1	Ind. gain from LDP
Shimane 1st	Hiroyuki Hosoda	LDP	Hiroyuki Hosoda	LDP	117,897	61.0	56,826	Kazuhisa Hamaguchi	DPJ	31.6	LDP hold
Shimane 2nd	Wataru Takeshita	LDP	Wataru Takeshita	LDP	145,555	63.8	94,604	Ryozo Ishida	DPJ	22.3	LDP hold
Shimane 3rd	Hisaoki Kamei	LDP	Seat abolished								LDP loss
Okayama 1st	Ichiro Aisawa	LDP	Ichiro Aisawa	LDP	102,318	57.6	38,855	Gentaro Kan	DPJ	35.7	LDP hold
Okayama 2nd	Akihiko Kumashiro	LDP	Akihiko Kumashiro	LDP	78,643	48.5	9,453	Keisuke Tsumura	DPJ	42.7	LDP hold
Okayama 3rd	Takeo Hiranuma	LDP	Takeo Hiranuma	LDP	125,949	67.3	77,939	Tetsuo Nakamura	DPJ	25.6	LDP hold
Okayama 4th	Ryutaro Hashimoto	LDP	Ryutaro Hashimoto	LDP	104,653	56.5	38,454	Michiyoshi Yunoki	DPJ	35.7	LDP hold
Okayama 5th	Yoshitaka Murata	LDP	Yoshitaka Murata	LDP	104,052	57.0	34,144	Tomoko Hata	DPJ	38.3	LDP hold
Hiroshima 1st	Fumio Kishida	LDP	Fumio Kishida	LDP	84,292	55.5	28,220	Masaaki Kakinuma	DPJ	36.9	LDP hold
Hiroshima 2nd	Toshinobu Awaya	IA	Daisuke Matsumoto	DPJ	81,382	37.5	19,910	Hiroshi Hiraguchi	IA	28.3	DPJ gain from IA
Hiroshima 3rd	Yoshitake Masuhara	LDP	Yoshitake Masuhara	LDP	106,972	60.2	53,590	Tetsuo Kaneko	SDP	30.0	LDP hold
Hiroshima 4th	Hidenao Nakagawa	LDP	Hidenao Nakagawa	LDP	86,275	54.7	36,491	Seiki Soramoto	DPJ	31.6	LDP hold
Hiroshima 5th	Yukihiko Ikeda	LDP	Yukihiko Ikeda	LDP	74,264	42.1	25,964	Shuichi Sasaki	DPJ	26.7	LDP hold
Hiroshima 6th	Shizuka Kamei	LDP	Shizuka Kamei	LDP	117,659	51.3	16,982	Koji Sato	DPJ	43.9	LDP hold
Hiroshima 7th	Yoichi Miyazawa	LDP	Yoichi Miyazawa	LDP	90,487	45.7	17,235	Takashi Wada	DPJ	37.0	LDP hold
Yamaguchi 1st	Masahiko Kōmura	LDP	Masahiko Kōmura	LDP	137,830	63.6	71,158	Hiroko Oizumi	DPJ	30.8	LDP hold
Yamaguchi 2nd	Hideo Hiraoka	DPJ	Hideo Hiraoka	DPJ	109,647	51.6	18,560	Shinji Satō	LDP	42.9	DPJ hold
Yamaguchi 3rd	Takeo Kawamura	LDP	Takeo Kawamura	LDP	111,658	63.2	60,683	Susumu Iwamoto	DPJ	28.9	LDP hold
Yamaguchi 4th	Shinzo Abe	LDP	Shinzo Abe	LDP	140,347	79.7	119,145	Junichiro Kojima	SDP	12.0	LDP hold

Proportional representation results
Party	Votes	Seats	Rank	Elected member	Constituency	Ratio
LDP	1,388,768 (37.4%)	5	1	Hisaoki Kamei		
LDP	1,388,768 (37.4%)	5	2	Katsuyuki Kawai		
LDP	1,388,768 (37.4%)	5	3	Katsunobu Katō		
LDP	1,388,768 (37.4%)	5	4	Kazuko Nose		
LDP	1,388,768 (37.4%)	5	5	Shinji Satō	Yamaguchi 2nd	83.0%
DPJ	1,254,880 (33.8%)	4	1	Osamu Yamauchi	Tottori 2nd	97.1%
DPJ	1,254,880 (33.8%)	4	1	Keisuke Tsumura	Okayama 2nd	87.9%
DPJ	1,254,880 (33.8%)	4	1	Koji Sato	Hiroshima 6th	85.5%
DPJ	1,254,880 (33.8%)	4	1	Takashi Wada	Hiroshima 7th	80.9%
Komei	657,311 (17.7%)	2	1	Tetsuo Saito		
Komei	657,311 (17.7%)	2	2	Keigo Masuya		

== Shikoku block ==
2003 Japanese general election in Shikoku
- 9 November 2003

All 19 seats to the House of Representatives
	Majority party	Minority party	Third party
Party	LDP	DPJ	Komei
Last election	14 seats	2 seats	1 seat
Constituency	12	1	0
PR seats	3	2	1
Total	15	3	1
Seat change	▲1	▲1	0
	Fourth party	Fifth party
Party	JCP	Ind.
Last election	1 seat	1 seat
Constituency	0	0
PR seats	0	–
Total	0	0
Seat change	▼1	▼1

Single-member constituency results in Shikoku
Constituency	Previous member		Elected member		Votes	%	Margin	Runner-up		%	Status
Tokushima 1st	Yoshito Sengoku	DPJ	Yoshito Sengoku	DPJ	60,917	53.0	16,025	Akira Shichijo	LDP	39.0	DPJ hold
Tokushima 2nd	Shunichi Yamaguchi	LDP	Shunichi Yamaguchi	LDP	72,116	51.4	9,622	Miho Takai	DPJ	44.5	LDP hold
Tokushima 3rd	Masazumi Gotoda	LDP	Masazumi Gotoda	LDP	85,671	60.0	36,260	Hirobumi Niki	DPJ	34.6	LDP hold
Kagawa 1st	Takuya Hirai	LDP	Takuya Hirai	LDP	79,298	49.2	16,359	Junya Ogawa	DPJ	39.0	LDP hold
Kagawa 2nd	Yoshio Kimura	LDP	Yoshio Kimura	LDP	85,370	56.4	27,694	Mitsuhiro Manabe	DPJ	38.1	LDP hold
Kagawa 3rd	Yoshinori Ohno	LDP	Yoshinori Ohno	LDP	84,803	61.1	61,716	Kenji Okuda	SDP	16.6	LDP hold
Ehime 1st	Yasuhisa Shiozaki	LDP	Yasuhisa Shiozaki	LDP	113,516	60.6	69,613	Akira Tamai	DPJ	23.4	LDP hold
Ehime 2nd	Seiichiro Murakami	LDP	Seiichiro Murakami	LDP	99,208	58.3	55,655	Masamitsu Saito	DPJ	25.6	LDP hold
Ehime 3rd	Shinya Ono	LDP	Shinya Ono	LDP	74,160	50.8	33,130	Tsuyoshi Takahashi	DPJ	28.1	LDP hold
Ehime 4th	Koichi Yamamoto	LDP	Koichi Yamamoto	LDP	117,252	71.2	79,688	Kinya Hamaguchi	DPJ	22.8	LDP hold
Kochi 1st	Teru Fukui	LDP	Teru Fukui	LDP	43,232	41.4	6,899	Masanori Goto	DPJ	34.8	LDP hold
Kochi 2nd	Gen Nakatani	LDP	Gen Nakatani	LDP	72,504	59.0	41,127	Kumiko Tamura	DPJ	25.5	LDP hold
Kochi 3rd	Yūji Yamamoto	LDP	Yūji Yamamoto	LDP	84,287	62.7	51,079	Yoshiaki Kawazoe	DPJ	24.7	LDP hold

Proportional representation results
Party	Votes	Seats	Rank	Elected member	Constituency	Ratio
LDP	708,051 (38.2%)	3	1	Hajime Morita		
LDP	708,051 (38.2%)	3	2	Yoshiro Okamoto		
LDP	708,051 (38.2%)	3	3	Akira Shichijo	Tokushima 1st	73.7%
DPJ	587,828 (31.7%)	2	1	Miho Takai	Tokushima 2nd	86.7%
DPJ	587,828 (31.7%)	2	1	Masanori Goto	Kochi 1st	84.0%
Komei	309,160 (16.7%)	1	1	Noritoshi Ishida		

== Kyushu block ==
2003 Japanese general election in Kyushu
- 9 November 2003

All 59 seats to the House of Representatives
	Majority party	Minority party	Third party
Party	LDP	DPJ	Komei
Last election	32 seats	11 seats	4 seats
Constituency	22	8	1
PR seats	8	7	3
Total	30	15	4
Seat change	▼2	▲4	0
	Fourth party	Fifth party	Sixth party
Party	SDP	JCP	LL
Last election	5 seats	2 seats	1 seat
Constituency	1	0	1
PR seats	2	1	–
Total	3	1	1
Seat change	▼2	▼1	0
	Seventh party	Eighth party
Party	NCP	Ind.
Last election	1 seat	3 seats
Constituency	0	5
PR seats	–	–
Total	0	5
Seat change	▼1	▲2

Single-member constituency results in Kyushu
Constituency	Previous member		Elected member		Votes	%	Margin	Runner-up		%	Status
Fukuoka 1st	Ryu Matsumoto	DPJ	Ryu Matsumoto	DPJ	92,969	54.6	39,358	Taisuke Tominaga	LDP	31.5	DPJ hold
Fukuoka 2nd	Taku Yamasaki	LDP	Junichiro Koga	DPJ	104,620	48.7	10,055	Taku Yamasaki	LDP	44.0	DPJ gain from LDP
Fukuoka 3rd	Seiichi Ota	LDP	Kazue Fujita	DPJ	101,742	48.0	5,903	Seiichi Ota	LDP	45.2	DPJ gain from LDP
Fukuoka 4th	Tomoyoshi Watanabe	LDP	Tomoyoshi Watanabe	LDP	95,469	50.8	15,757	Kinya Narazaki	DPJ	42.4	LDP hold
Fukuoka 5th	Yoshiaki Harada	LDP	Yoshiaki Harada	LDP	105,071	48.3	23,905	Daizo Kusuda	DPJ	37.3	LDP hold
Fukuoka 6th	Ryuzo Aramaki	LDP	Issei Koga	DPJ	108,678	48.9	5,062	Ryuzo Aramaki	LDP	36.7	DPJ gain from LDP
Fukuoka 7th	Makoto Koga	LDP	Makoto Koga	LDP	119,837	63.6	70,575	Emiko Baba	SDP	26.1	LDP hold
Fukuoka 8th	Tarō Asō	LDP	Tarō Asō	LDP	132,646	57.7	56,767	Kusuo Oshima	DPJ	33.0	LDP hold
Fukuoka 9th	Kenji Kitahashi	DPJ	Kenji Kitahashi	DPJ	102,581	45.2	3,490	Asahiko Mihara	LDP	43.6	DPJ hold
Fukuoka 10th	Shozaburo Jimi	LDP	Shozaburo Jimi	LDP	91,974	45.2	12,239	Takashi Kii	DPJ	39.2	LDP hold
Fukuoka 11th	Kozo Yamamoto	LDP	Ryota Takeda	Ind.	78,882	42.4	16,254	Kozo Yamamoto	LDP	33.7	Ind. gain from LDP
Saga 1st	Takanori Sakai	LDP	Kazuhiro Haraguchi	DPJ	70,271	46.8	3,825	Takamaro Fukuoka	LDP	44.3	DPJ gain from LDP
Saga 2nd	Masahiro Imamura	LDP	Masahiro Imamura	LDP	107,522	82.4	84,624	Minoru Morota	JCP	17.6	LDP hold
Saga 3rd	Kosuke Hori	LDP	Kosuke Hori	LDP	102,859	69.7	66,206	Hiromi Fujisawa	DPJ	24.8	LDP hold
Nagasaki 1st	Yoshiaki Takaki	DPJ	Yoshiaki Takaki	DPJ	106,331	50.6	15,474	Masakazu Kuranari	LDP	43.3	DPJ hold
Nagasaki 2nd	Fumio Kyūma	LDP	Fumio Kyūma	LDP	126,705	65.3	75,933	Noriko Kumae	SDP	26.2	LDP hold
Nagasaki 3rd	Kazuo Torashima	LDP	Yaichi Tanigawa	LDP	77,528	50.3	6,429	Masahiko Yamada	DPJ	46.2	LDP hold
Nagasaki 4th	Seigo Kitamura	LDP	Seigo Kitamura	LDP	100,767	61.6	47,210	Masami Imagawa	SDP	32.7	LDP hold
Kumamoto 1st	Yorihisa Matsuno	DPJ	Yorihisa Matsuno	DPJ	111,205	54.2	31,094	Eiichi Iwashita	LDP	39.1	DPJ hold
Kumamoto 2nd	Takeshi Noda	LDP	Takeshi Hayashida	LDP	95,233	52.7	19,716	Nobuo Matsuno	DPJ	41.8	LDP hold
Kumamoto 3rd	Toshikatsu Matsuoka	LDP	Tetsushi Sakamoto	Ind.	79,500	42.5	3,031	Toshikatsu Matsuoka	LDP	40.9	Ind. gain from LDP
Kumamoto 4th	Hiroyuki Sonoda	LDP	Hiroyuki Sonoda	LDP	137,428	73.6	100,451	Ikuo Morikawa	SDP	19.8	LDP hold
Kumamoto 5th	Yasushi Kaneko	LDP	Yasushi Kaneko	LDP	95,321	57.8	37,420	Hidetomo Goto	DPJ	35.1	LDP hold
Oita 1st	Vacant	DPJ	Shuji Kira	Ind.	105,628	48.6	3,839	Seiichi Eto	LDP	46.8	Ind. gain from DPJ
Oita 2nd	Seishirō Etō	LDP	Seishirō Etō	LDP	123,434	56.2	37,768	Yasumasa Shigeno	SDP	39.0	LDP hold
Oita 3rd	Takeshi Iwaya	LDP	Takeshi Iwaya	LDP	123,798	51.3	12,618	Katsuhiko Yokomitsu	SDP	46.0	LDP hold
Oita 4th	Katsuhiko Yokomitsu	SDP	Seat abolished								SDP loss
Miyazaki 1st	Nariaki Nakayama	LDP	Nariaki Nakayama	LDP	99,969	52.7	28,353	Takashi Yonezawa	DPJ	37.8	LDP hold
Miyazaki 2nd	Takami Eto	LDP	Taku Etō	Ind.	88,540	43.6	9,421	Kenji Kuroki	Ind.	39.0	Ind. gain from LDP
Miyazaki 3rd	Kazumi Mochinaga	LDP	Yoshihisa Furukawa	Ind.	118,607	63.2	60,254	Tetsuji Mochinaga	Ind.	31.1	Ind. gain from LDP
Kagoshima 1st	Okiharu Yasuoka	LDP	Okiharu Yasuoka	LDP	95,841	52.0	16,598	Hiroshi Kawauchi	DPJ	43.0	LDP hold
Kagoshima 2nd	Torao Tokuda	LL	Torao Tokuda	LL	97,423	49.1	6,471	Shuko Sonoda	LDP	45.9	LL hold
Kagoshima 3rd	Kazuaki Miyaji	LDP	Kazuaki Miyaji	LDP	113,743	66.9	68,435	Shoji Ozono	DPJ	36.6	LDP hold
Kagoshima 4th	Sadatoshi Ozato	LDP	Sadatoshi Ozato	LDP	104,843	61.5	45,768	Kenichi Hamada	SDP	34.7	LDP hold
Kagoshima 5th	Sadanori Yamanaka	LDP	Sadanori Yamanaka	LDP	100,851	61.6	48,966	Masatake Yone	Ind.	31.7	LDP hold
Okinawa 1st	Taiichi Shiraho	Komei	Taiichi Shiraho	Komei	58,330	37.0	5,956	Mikio Shimoji	Ind.	33.3	Komei hold
Okinawa 2nd	Seiji Nakamura	LDP	Kantoku Teruya	SDP	74,123	55.4	26,364	Yoshiji Uehara	LDP	35.7	SDP gain from LDP
Okinawa 3rd	Mitsuko Tomon	SDP	Chiken Kakazu	LDP	62,975	38.5	4,044	Mitsuko Tomon	SDP	36.0	LDP gain from SDP
Okinawa 4th	New seat		Kosaburo Nishime	LDP	67,752	54.5	29,202	Tadahiro Miyakuni	DPJ	31.0	LDP win

Proportional representation results
Party	Votes	Seats	Rank	Elected member	Constituency	Ratio
LDP	2,535,278 (36.5%)	8	1	Takeshi Noda		
LDP	2,535,278 (36.5%)	8	2	Tadahiro Matsushita		
LDP	2,535,278 (36.5%)	8	3	Seiji Nakamura		
LDP	2,535,278 (36.5%)	8	4	Kyoko Nishikawa		
LDP	2,535,278 (36.5%)	8	5	Ren Sato		
LDP	2,535,278 (36.5%)	8	6	Asahiko Mihara	Fukuoka 9th	96.5%
LDP	2,535,278 (36.5%)	8	6	Seiichi Eto	Oita 1st	96.3%
LDP	2,535,278 (36.5%)	8	6	Toshikatsu Matsuoka	Kumamoto 3rd	96.1%
DPJ	2,182,400 (31.4%)	7	1	Masahiko Yamada	Nagasaki 3rd	91.7%
DPJ	2,182,400 (31.4%)	7	1	Takashi Kii	Fukuoka 10th	86.6%
DPJ	2,182,400 (31.4%)	7	1	Kinya Narazaki	Fukuoka 4th	83.4%
DPJ	2,182,400 (31.4%)	7	1	Hiroshi Kawauchi	Kagoshima 1st	82.6%
DPJ	2,182,400 (31.4%)	7	1	Nobuo Matsuno	Kumamoto 2nd	79.2%
DPJ	2,182,400 (31.4%)	7	1	Daizo Kusuda	Fukuoka 5th	77.2%
DPJ	2,182,400 (31.4%)	7	1	Takashi Yonezawa	Miyazaki 1st	71.6%
Komei	1,176,391 (16.9%)	3	1	Takenori Kanzaki		
Komei	1,176,391 (16.9%)	3	2	Junji Higashi		
Komei	1,176,391 (16.9%)	3	3	Yasuyuki Eda		
SDP	613,875 (8.8%)	2	1	Mitsuko Tomon	Okinawa 3rd	93.5%
SDP	613,875 (8.8%)	2	1	Katsuhiko Yokomitsu	Oita 3rd	89.8%
JCP	434,099 (6.3%)	1	1	Seiken Akamine	Okinawa 1st	33.4%

== Leaders' races ==
Results for party leaders
Party	Member	Constituency	Votes	%	Position	Status
LDP	Junichiro Koizumi	Kanagawa 11th	174,374	74.4	1st	Re-elected
DPJ	Naoto Kan	Tokyo 18th	139,195	58.4	1st	Re-elected
Komei	Takenori Kanzaki	Kyushu PR	1,176,391	16.9	1st	Re-elected
JCP	Kazuo Shii	South Kanto PR	521,309	7.4	1st	Re-elected
SDP	Takako Doi	Hyogo 7th	86,404	40.8	2nd	Defeated
SDP	Takako Doi	Kinki PR	375,228	3.1	1st	Elected
NCP	Hiroshi Kumagai	Shizuoka 7th	58,932	27.9	2nd	Defeated
IA	Masami Tanabu	House of Councillors				
LL	Torao Tokuda	Kagoshima 2nd	97,423	49.1	1st	Re-elected

== Closest races ==
Candidates with a narrow loss ratio of over 90%
Constituency	Candidate		Votes	%	Ratio
Miyagi 3rd	Kiyohito Hashimoto	DPJ	73,803	46.2	99.7
Hokkaido 6th	Hidenori Sasaki	DPJ	111,656	39.9	99.5
Saitama 3rd	Hiroshi Imai	LDP	103,588	46.3	99.4
Saitama 13th	Yuriko Takeyama	DPJ	81,361	42.9	99.3
Kanagawa 6th	Motohisa Ikeda	DPJ	81,733	36.5	99.3
Aichi 10th	Kanju Sato	DPJ	106,599	45.3	99.3
Chiba 3rd	Hirokazu Matsuno	LDP	84,693	47.3	98.9
Osaka 12th	Tomokatsu Kitagawa	LDP	81,270	44.1	98.9
Hyogo 1st	Hajime Ishii	DPJ	70,792	38.3	98.9
Tokyo 1st	Kaoru Yosano	LDP	103,785	44.0	98.6
Tokyo 24th	Yukihiko Akutsu	DPJ	106,733	43.4	98.1
Fukushima 1st	Yoshitami Kameoka	IA	96,954	34.2	98.0
Saitama 8th	Atsushi Kinoshita	DPJ	69,418	38.3	97.8
Tokyo 13th	Ichirō Kamoshita	LDP	88,254	42.6	97.8
Kanagawa 8th	Kenji Eda	Ind.	78,782	37.7	97.6
Hokkaido 3rd	Gaku Ishizaki	LDP	111,252	45.6	97.5
Shizuoka 8th	Yasutomo Suzuki	DPJ	101,484	46.2	97.5
Kanagawa 7th	Tsuneo Suzuki	LDP	93,857	45.3	97.3
Kanagawa 12th	Ikuzo Sakurai	LDP	73,767	26.3	97.3
Ishikawa 1st	Hiroshi Hase	LDP	97,075	46.8	97.2
Tottori 2nd	Osamu Yamauchi	DPJ	50,989	32.1	97.2
Fukui 1st	Ryuzo Sasaki	Ind.	54,019	40.8	97.0
Hyogo 5th	Yasuhiro Kajiwara	DPJ	108,851	46.0	96.8
Fukuoka 9th	Asahiko Mihara	LDP	99,091	43.6	96.6
Miyagi 2nd	Masashi Nakano	LDP	94,621	43.8	96.5
Tokyo 12th	Yukihisa Fujita	DPJ	95,110	42.4	96.4
Oita 1st	Seiichi Eto	LDP	101,789	46.8	96.4
Gifu 3rd	Yasuhiro Sonoda	DPJ	110,796	45.9	96.2
Kumamoto 3rd	Toshikatsu Matsuoka	LDP	26,317	40.9	96.2
Aichi 13th	Satoshi Shima	DPJ	109,670	46.6	96.1
Osaka 9th	Takeshi Nishida	LDP	93,662	40.2	96.0
Hyogo 2nd	Fusaho Izumi	DPJ	80,061	41.5	96.0
Hyogo 12th	Tsuyoshi Yamaguchi	IA	103,848	47.0	95.7
Tokyo 14th	Kazuo Inoue	DPJ	63,385	32.8	95.4
Fukuoka 6th	Ryuzo Aramaki	LDP	103,616	36.7	95.3
Shiga 4th	Tenzo Okumura	DPJ	78,954	44.5	95.0
Chiba 8th	Yoshitaka Sakurada	LDP	95,627	44.4	94.9
Nagano 1st	Takashi Shinohara	DPJ	111,821	42.6	94.7
Shizuoka 5th	Toshitsugu Saito	LDP	129,988	26.8	94.7
Saga 1st	Takamaro Fukuoka	LDP	66,446	44.3	94.6
Tokyo 10th	Muneaki Samejima	DPJ	77,417	42.7	94.4
Chiba 6th	Hiromichi Watanabe	LDP	79,161	44.1	94.3
Osaka 4th	Yasuhide Nakayama	LDP	87,187	42.2	94.3
Fukuoka 3rd	Seiichi Ota	LDP	95,839	45.2	94.2
Aichi 4th	Hiroshi Kondo	LDP	79,749	41.4	93.9
Hokkaido 5th	Chiyomi Kobayashi	DPJ	120,912	43.7	93.7
Shiga 2nd	Osamu Konishi	LDP	65,033	41.9	93.4
Kagoshima 2nd	Shuko Sonoda	LDP	90,952	45.9	93.4
Okinawa 3rd	Mitsuko Tomon	SDP	58,931	36.0	93.6
Chiba 13th	Yasuhiko Wakai	DPJ	75,927	44.9	93.0
Tokyo 5th	Takashi Kosugi	LDP	99,618	41.0	93.0
Tokyo 3rd	Hirotaka Ishihara	LDP	113,494	43.9	92.9
Tokyo 22nd	Tatsuya Ito	LDP	105,385	42.5	92.5
Osaka 5th	Tetsuo Inami	DPJ	85,334	39.6	92.4
Aomori 1st	Hokuto Yokoyama	Ind.	74,799	36.4	91.8
Saitama 6th	Kaneshige Wakamatsu	Komei	130,511	44.1	91.8
Nagasaki 3rd	Masahiko Yamada	DPJ	71,099	46.2	91.7
Aichi 7th	Takashi Aoyama	LDP	93,882	40.3	91.4
Nagano 2nd	Jin Murai	LDP	98,756	39.2	91.1
Saitama 9th	Fumihiko Igarashi	DPJ	94,569	43.9	90.8
Saitama 7th	Kiyoshi Nakano	LDP	88,151	42.4	90.5
Fukuoka 2nd	Taku Yamasaki	LDP	94,565	44.0	90.4
Ibaraki 3rd	Toshiaki Koizumi	DPJ	92,306	44.1	90.2
Shizuoka 1st	Yōko Kamikawa	LDP	67,437	30.2	90.2
