= List of members of the House of Representatives of Japan, 2003–2005 =

43rd House of Representatives	(2003)
44th House of Representatives	(2005)
45th House of Representatives	(2009)

This is a list of Representatives elected to the House of Representatives for the Forty-Third session of the House of Representatives of the National Diet of Japan at the 2003 general election, held on November 9, 2003.

== Composition ==
Affiliation	Members
Liberal Democratic Party	247
Democratic Party	178
New Komeito Party	34
Japan Communist Party	8
Social Democratic Party	6
Independent	7
Total	480
Government Majority	281
Opposition	199

=== The Government ===
==== Liberal Democratic Party (247 members) ====
- Shinzo Abe
- Ichiro Aisawa
- Norihiko Akagi
- Akira Amari
- Takashi Aoyama
- Taro Aso
- Koki Chuma
- Toshiaki Endo
- Takehiko Endo
- Tetsuma Esaki
- Yoichiro Esaki
- Akinori Eto
- Taku Eto
- Seiichi Eto
- Seishiro Eto
- Takao Fujii
- Yasuo Fukuda
- Teru Fukui
- Hajime Funada
- Yoshihisa Furukawa
- Keiji Furuya
- Koji Futada
- Shigeyuki Goto
- Masazumi Gotoda
- Koki Hagino
- Koichi Hagiuda
- Kyogon Hagiyama
- Yasukazu Hamada
- Yasuhiro Hanashi
- Yoshitsugu Harada
- Yoshiaki Harada
- Hiroshi Hase
- Ryutaro Hashimoto
- Susumu Hasumi
- Kunio Hatoyama
- Chuko Hayakawa
- Motoo Hayashi
- Takeshi Hayashida
- Takuya Hirai
- Takeo Hiranuma
- Katsuei Hirasawa
- Koichi Hirata
- Kosuke Hori
- Mitsuo Horiuchi
- Takeshi Hosaka
- Hiroyuki Hosoda
- Bunmei Ibuki
- Hiroshi Imai
- Masahiro Imamura
- Hiroshi Imazu
- Yamato Inaba
- Kiichi Inoue
- Shinji Inoue
- Shigeru Ishiba
- Masatoshi Ishida
- Nobuteru Ishihara
- Gaku Ishizaki
- Kosuke Ito
- Shintaro Ito
- Tatsuya Ito
- Mineichi Iwanaga
- Tadao Iwasaki
- Takeshi Iwaya
- Shozaburo Jimi
- Yukio Jitsukawa
- Toshiki Kaifu
- Hiroshi Kajiyama
- Chiken Kakazu
- Hisaoki Kamei
- Yoshiyuki Kamei
- Shizuka Kamei
- Yoko Kamikawa
- Ichiro Kamoshita
- Yasushi Kaneko
- Kazuyoshi Kaneko
- Eiko Kaneta
- Katsunobu Kato
- Koichi Kato
- Katsuyuki Kawai
- Yoshihiro Kawakami
- Takeo Kawamura
- Tsutomu Kawara
- Jiro Kawasaki
- Takahide Kimura
- Ben Kimura
- Taro Kimura
- Yoshio Kimura
- Fumio Kishida
- Tomokatsu Kitagawa
- Seigo Kitamura
- Naoto Kitamura
- Minoru Kiuchi
- Koki Kobayashi
- Makoto Koga
- Yuriko Koike
- Junichiro Koizumi
- Ryuji Koizumi
- Toshio Kojima
- Saburo Komoto
- Masahiko Komura
- Motohiko Kondo
- Osamu Konishi
- Taro Kono
- Kenji Kosaka
- Takashi Kosugi
- Akihiko Kumashiro
- Masatoshi Kurata
- Fumio Kyuma
- Nobutaka Machimura
- Toshio Masuda
- Yoshitake Masuhara
- Isao Matsumiya
- Jun Matsumoto
- Hirokazu Matsuno
- Toshikatsu Matsuoka
- Midori Matsushima
- Tadahiro Matsushita
- Asahiko Mihara
- Nobuhide Minorikawa
- Takashi Mitsubayashi
- Norio Mitsuya
- Kazuaki Miyaji
- Mitsuhiro Miyakoshi
- Ichiro Miyashita
- Yoichi Miyazawa
- Kenichi Mizuno
- Yoshio Mochizuki
- Eisuke Mori
- Yoshiro Mori
- Masahiro Morioka
- Hajime Morita
- Hiroshi Moriyama
- Mayumi Moriyama
- Toshimitsu Motegi
- Jin Murai
- Seiichiro Murakami
- Yoshitaka Murata
- Kabun Muto
- Yoji Nagaoka
- Jinen Nagase
- Shoichi Nakagawa
- Hidenao Nakagawa
- Seiji Nakamura
- Shozaburo Nakamura
- Kazuyoshi Nakanishi
- Kiyoshi Nakano
- Masashi Nakano
- Gen Nakatani
- Yasuhide Nakayama
- Taro Nakayama
- Nariaki Nakayama
- Takumi Nemoto
- Toshihiro Nikai
- Takeshi Nishida
- Koya Nishikawa
- Kyoko Nishikawa
- Kosaburo Nishime
- Akihiro Nishimura
- Akira Nishino
- Yuya Niwa
- Seiko Noda
- Takeshi Noda
- Hosei Norota
- Kazuko Nose
- Fukushiro Nukaga
- Yuko Obuchi
- Yoshinori Ohno
- Yoshiro Okamoto
- Hachiro Okonogi
- Shinsuke Okuno
- Shigeo Omae
- Koji Omi
- Hideaki Omura
- Shinya Ono
- Matsushige Ono
- Itsunori Onodera
- Tadamori Oshima
- Sadatoshi Ozato
- Toshitsugu Saito
- Tetsushi Sakamoto
- Goji Sakamoto
- Yoshitaka Sakurada
- Ikuzo Sakurai
- Takashi Sasagawa
- Genichiro Sata
- Akira Satō
- Tsutomu Sato
- Ren Sato
- Shinji Sato
- Tatsuo Sato
- Masahiko Shibayama
- Akira Shichijo
- Yoshinobu Shimamura
- Hakubun Shimomura
- Ryu Shionoya
- Yasuhisa Shiozaki
- Hiroyuki Sonoda
- Yoshihide Suga
- Isshu Sugawara
- Seiken Sugiura
- Keisuke Sunada
- Tsuneo Suzuki
- Junji Suzuki
- Shunichi Suzuki
- Kotaro Tachibana
- Tsuyoshi Takagi
- Tsutomu Takebe
- Ryota Takeda
- Naokazu Takemoto
- Wataru Takeshita
- Makoto Taki
- Tokuichiro Tamazawa
- Norihisa Tamura
- Yasufumi Tanahashi
- Kazunori Tanaka
- Hideo Tanaka
- Koichi Tani
- Sadakazu Tanigaki
- Yaichi Tanigawa
- Takashi Tanihata
- Tatsuya Tanimoto
- Ryotaro Tanose
- Minoru Terada
- Kisaburo Tokai
- Shinako Tsuchiya
- Yuji Tsushima
- Kyoichi Tsushima
- Shigeo Uetake
- Osamu Uno
- Hiromichi Watanabe
- Tomoyoshi Watanabe
- Yoshimi Watanabe
- Tamisuke Watanuki
- Daishiro Yamagiwa
- Taimei Yamaguchi
- Shunichi Yamaguchi
- Yuji Yamamoto
- Akihiko Yamamoto
- Taku Yamamoto
- Koichi Yamamoto
- Takafumi Yamashita
- Takuji Yanagimoto
- Hakuo Yanagisawa
- Eita Yashiro
- Okiharu Yasuoka
- Yoshio Yatsu
- Kaoru Yosano
- Masayoshi Yoshino

==== New Komeito (34 members) ====
- Kazuyoshi Akaba
- Masao Akamatsu
- Yasuyuki Eda
- Otohiko Endo
- Yutaka Fukushima
- Noriko Furuya
- Tetsuzo Fuyushiba
- Junji Higashi
- Yasuko Ikenobo
- Yoshihisa Inoue
- Noritoshi Ishida
- Keiichi Ishii
- Takenori Kanzaki
- Masatomo Kawai
- Nobuo Kawakami
- Kazuo Kitagawa
- Kaori Maruya
- Keigo Masuya
- Hiroaki Nagasawa
- Hiroyoshi Nishi
- Yoshinori Oguchi
- Akihiro Ota
- Tetsuo Saito
- Chikara Sakaguchi
- Shigeki Sato
- Taiichi Shiraho
- Masahiro Tabata
- Michiyo Takagi
- Yosuke Takagi
- Takayoshi Taniguchi
- Shigeyuki Tomita
- Isamu Ueda
- Yoshio Urushibara
- Yasuhide Yamana

== The Opposition ==
=== Democratic Party (178 members) ===
- Hirotaka Akamatsu
- Yukihiko Akutsu
- Ai Aoki
- Satoshi Arai
- Jun Azumi
- Yutaka Banno
- Ryuichi Doi
- Yukio Edano
- Hirohisa Fujii
- Osamu Fujimura
- Kazue Fujita
- Yukihisa Fujita
- Motohisa Furukawa
- Shinichiro Furumoto
- Koichiro Gemba
- Masanori Goto
- Yoshio Hachiro
- Keiko Hakariya
- Kazuhiro Haraguchi
- Kiyohito Hashimoto
- Tsutomu Hata
- Yukio Hatoyama
- Miyoko Hida
- Takeshi Hidaka
- Hirofumi Hirano
- Hideo Hiraoka
- Hiranao Honda
- Ikuo Horigome
- Ritsuo Hosokawa
- Goshi Hosono
- Yasuo Ichikawa
- Koichiro Ichimura
- Fumihiko Igarashi
- Motohisa Ikeda
- Tetsuo Inami
- Kazuo Inoue
- Katsuyuki Ishida
- Eiko Ishige
- Hajime Ishii
- Chuji Ito
- Tetsundo Iwakuni
- Kenta Izumi
- Fusaho Izumi
- Hideo Jimpu
- Masamitsu Jojima
- Banri Kaieda
- Yasuhiro Kajiwara
- Sayuri Kamata
- Naoto Kan
- Seiichi Kaneta
- Michihiko Kano
- Naohiko Kato
- Koichi Kato
- Tatsuo Kawabata
- Takashi Kawamura
- Hiroshi Kawauchi
- Takashi Kii
- Toru Kikawada
- Makiko Kikuta
- Shuji Kira
- Takeshi Kishimoto
- Kenji Kitahashi
- Kenji Kobayashi
- Chiyomi Kobayashi
- Tadamasa Kodaira
- Issei Koga
- Toshiaki Koizumi
- Yasuko Komiyama
- Yoko Komiyama
- Yosuke Kondo
- Shoichi Kondo
- Azuma Konno
- Daizo Kusuda
- Sumio Mabuchi
- Yukichi Maeda
- Seiji Maehara
- Yoshio Maki
- Seishu Makino
- Teruhiko Mashiko
- Jin Matsubara
- Kenko Matsuki
- Takeaki Matsumoto
- Daisuke Matsumoto
- Ryu Matsumoto
- Yorihisa Matsuno
- Nobuo Matsuno
- Kimiaki Matsuzaki
- Tetsuhisa Matsuzaki
- Taizo Mikazuki
- Wakio Mitsui
- Hiroko Mizushima
- Muneaki Murai
- Hirotami Murakoshi
- Kunihiko Muroi
- Hiroyuki Nagahama
- Akihisa Nagashima
- Hisayasu Nagata
- Akira Nagatsuma
- Takashi Nagayasu
- Osamu Nakagawa
- Masaharu Nakagawa
- Hiroshi Nakai
- Tetsuji Nakamura
- Yasuhiro Nakane
- Jo Nakano
- Hiroko Nakano
- Hirosato Nakatsugawa
- Ikko Nakatsuka
- Yoshikatsu Nakayama
- Kinya Narazaki
- Chinami Nishimura (politician)
- Shingo Nishimura
- Yoshihiko Noda
- Akihiro Ohata
- Akira Oide
- Hisako Oishi
- Katsuya Okada
- Kazumasa Okajima
- Mitsunori Okamoto
- Ken Okuda
- Tenzo Okumura
- Atsushi Oshima
- Nobumori Otani
- Sakihito Ozawa
- Ichiro Ozawa
- Hirofumi Ryu
- Muneaki Samejima
- Hidenori Sasaki
- Koji Sato
- Kenichiro Sato
- Yoshito Sengoku
- Satoshi Shima
- Hisashi Shimada
- Mitsu Shimojo
- Takashi Shinohara
- Yasuhiro Sonoda
- Hiroshi Sudo
- Yoshinori Suematsu
- Nobuhiko Suto
- Yasutomo Suzuki
- Katsumasa Suzuki
- Issei Tajima
- Kaname Tajima
- Miho Takai
- Yoshiaki Takaki
- Satoshi Takayama
- Koichi Takemasa
- Yuriko Takeyama
- Kazuya Tamaki
- Keishu Tanaka
- Makiko Tanaka
- Yoshikazu Tarui
- Shinji Tarutoko
- Takuya Tasso
- Manabu Terata
- Yoshio Tezuka
- Megumu Tsuji
- Keisuke Tsumura
- Nobutaka Tsutsui
- Yuzuru Tsuzuki
- Yukio Ubukata
- Akira Uchiyama
- Noboru Usami
- Takashi Wada
- Yasuhiko Wakai
- Seizō Wakaizumi
- Shu Watanabe
- Kozo Watanabe
- Masahiko Yamada
- Ikuo Yamahana
- Kazunori Yamanoi
- Kenji Yamaoka
- Osamu Yamauchi
- Takahiro Yokomichi
- Takashi Yonezawa
- Izumi Yoshida
- Osamu Yoshida

=== Japan Communist Party (8 members) ===
- Ikuko Ishii
- Keiji Kokuta
- Kensho Sasaki
- Kazuo Shii
- Tetsuya Shiokawa
- Chizuko Takahashi
- Tomio Yamaguchi
- Hidekatsu Yoshii

=== Social Democratic Party (6 members) ===
- Tomoko Abe
- Takako Doi
- Kantoku Teruya
- Mitsuko Tomon
- Kiyohiro Yamamoto
- Katsuhiko Yokomitsu

=== Independents (7 members) ===
- Junichiro Koga
- Yohei Kono
- Kansei Nakano
- Yasutoshi Nishimura
- Torao Tokuda
- Shogo Tsugawa
