= List of members of the House of Representatives of Japan, 2005–2009 =

| 43rd House of Representatives | (2003) |
| 44th House of Representatives | (2005) |
| 45th House of Representatives | (2009) |

This is a list of Representatives elected to the House of Representatives for the Forty-Fourth session of the House of Representatives of the National Diet of Japan at the 2005 general election, held on 11 September 2005.

== Composition ==
| Affiliation | Members |
|---|---|
| Liberal Democratic Party | 293 |
| Democratic Party | 113 |
| New Komeito Party | 20 |
| Japan Communist Party | 9 |
| Social Democratic Party | 7 |
| People's New Party - New Party Nippon | 6 |
| Independent - Minor Parties | 20 |
| Total | 480 |
| Government Majority | 313 |
| Opposition | 167 |

=== The Government ===
==== Liberal Democratic Party (293 members) ====
- Shinzō Abe
- Toshiko Abe
- Kazuo Aichi
- Ichiro Aisawa
- Norihiko Akagi
- Masaaki Akaike
- Jiro Akama
- Ryosei Akazawa
- Kenya Akiba
- Akira Amari
- Etsuji Arai
- Osamu Ashitomi
- Tarō Asō
- Kōki Chūma
- Masaki Doi
- Tōru Doi
- Nobuhiko Endō
- Takehiko Endo
- Toshiaki Endo
- Tetsuma Esaki
- Yoichiro Esaki
- Akinori Eto
- Seishiro Etō
- Yuji Fujii
- Makiko Fujino
- Mikio Fujita
- Takashi Fukaya
- Mineyuki Fukuda
- Yasuo Fukuda
- Yoshihiko Fukuda
- Teru Fukui
- Takamaro Fukuoka
- Hajime Funada
- Koji Futada
- Shigeyuki Goto
- Masazumi Gotoda
- Koichi Hagiuda
- Seiji Hagiwara
- Kyogon Hagiyama
- Yasukazu Hamada
- Yasuhiro Hanashi
- Yoshiaki Harada
- Yoshitsugu Harada
- Hiroshi Hase
- Gaku Hashimoto
- Kunio Hatoyama
- Chuko Hayakawa
- Jun Hayashi
- Motoo Hayashi
- Takeshi Hayashida
- Hiroshi Hiraguchi
- Takuya Hirai
- Katsuei Hirasawa
- Koichi Hirata
- Motoko Hirotsu
- Hiroyuki Hosoda
- Bummei Ibuki
- Yukari Iijima
- Hiroshi Imai
- Hiroshi Imazu
- Yamato Inaba
- Tomomi Inada
- Kuniko Inoguchi
- Kiichi Inoue
- Shinji Inoue
- Shigeru Ishiba
- Masatoshi Ishida
- Hirotaka Ishihara
- Nobuteru Ishihara
- Gaku Ishizaki
- Kosuke Ito
- Shintaro Ito
- Tadahiko Ito
- Tatsuya Ito
- Nobuko Iwaki
- Mineichi Iwanaga
- Takeshi Iwaya
- Kyoko Izawa
- Yukio Jitsukawa
- Chube Kagita
- Toshiki Kaifu
- Hiroshi Kajiyama
- Chiken Kakazu
- Yoshitami Kameoka
- Yoko Kamikawa
- Ichiro Kamoshita
- Kazuyoshi Kaneko
- Yasushi Kaneko
- Zenjiro Kaneko
- Satsuki Katayama
- Katsunobu Kato
- Koichi Kato
- Katsuyuki Kawai
- Shika Kawajo
- Takeo Kawamura
- Riki Kawara
- Jiro Kawasaki
- Minoru Kihara
- Seiji Kihara
- Ben Kimura
- Takahide Kimura
- Tarō Kimura
- Yoshio Kimura
- Fumio Kishida
- Tomokatsu Kitagawa
- Seigo Kitamura
- Shigeo Kitamura
- Tsukasa Kobiki
- Makoto Koga
- Yuriko Koike
- Junichiro Koizumi
- Toshio Kojima
- Saburo Komoto
- Masahiko Komura
- Mitsue Kondo
- Motohiko Kondo
- Taro Kono
- Kenji Kosaka
- Takashi Kosugi
- Masatoshi Kurata
- Fumio Kyuma
- Nobutaka Machimura
- Hideki Makihara
- Yoshitake Masuhara
- Fumiaki Matsumoto
- Jun Matsumoto
- Yohei Matsumoto
- Kenshiro Matsunami
- Kenta Matsunami
- Hirokazu Matsuno
- Toshikatsu Matsuoka
- Midori Matsushima
- Tatsuharu Mawatari
- Asahiko Mihara
- Nobuhide Minorikawa
- Takashi Mitsubayashi
- Norio Mitsuya
- Kazuaki Miyaji
- Mitsuhiro Miyakoshi
- Ichiro Miyashita
- Yoichi Miyazawa
- Kenichi Mizuno
- Yoshio Mochizuki
- Eisuke Mori
- Yoshiro Mori
- Masahito Moriyama
- Mayumi Moriyama
- Toshimitsu Motegi
- Seiichiro Murakami
- Yoshitaka Murata
- Yoji Muto
- Keiko Nagaoka
- Kotaro Nagasaki
- Jinen Nagase
- Tadayoshi Nagashima
- Hidenao Nakagawa
- Shoichi Nakagawa
- Yasuhiro Nakagawa
- Fukuyo Nakamori
- Seiji Nakamura
- Kazuyuki Nakane
- Kiyoshi Nakano
- Masashi Nakano
- Gen Nakatani
- Nariaki Nakayama
- Taro Nakayama
- Yasuhide Nakayama
- Masayoshi Namiki
- Takumi Nemoto
- Toshihiro Nikai
- Takeshi Nishida
- Koya Nishikawa
- Kyoko Nishikawa
- Kosaburo Nishime
- Katsuko Nishimoto
- Akihiro Nishimura
- Yasutoshi Nishimura
- Akira Nishino
- Hideki Niwa
- Yuya Niwa
- Takeshi Noda
- Fukushiro Nukaga
- Yuko Obuchi
- Takao Ochi
- Yuichi Ogawa
- Matsushige Ohno
- Yoshinori Ohno
- Hideaki Okabe
- Yoshiro Okamoto
- Nobuko Okashita
- Hachiro Okonogi
- Shinsuke Okuno
- Shigeo Omae
- Koji Omi
- Nobuhiro Omiya
- Hideaki Omura
- Jiro Ono
- Shinya Ono
- Itsunori Onodera
- Tadamori Oshima
- Seiichi Ota
- Takashi Otsuka
- Taku Otsuka
- Yasuhiro Ozato
- Toshitsugu Saito
- Manabu Sakai
- Goji Sakamoto
- Yoshitaka Sakurada
- Ikuzo Sakurai
- Takashi Sasagawa
- Genichiro Sata
- Ren Sato
- Tatsuo Sato (politician)
- Tsutomu Sato
- Yukari Sato
- Yoshihiro Seki
- Masahiko Shibayama
- Akira Shichijo
- Yoshinobu Shimamura
- Koichiro Shimizu
- Seiichiro Shimizu
- Hakubun Shimomura
- Yoshitaka Shindo
- Yosuke Shinoda
- Ryu Shionoya
- Yasuhisa Shiozaki
- Hiroyuki Sonoda
- Kentaro Sonoura
- Yoshihide Suga
- Isshu Sugawara
- Taizō Sugimura
- Motoshi Sugita
- Seiken Sugiura
- Junji Suzuki
- Keisuke Suzuki
- Shunichi Suzuki
- Tsuneo Suzuki
- Masaaki Taira
- Tsuyoshi Takagi
- Sanae Takaichi
- Shuichi Takatori
- Tsutomu Takebe
- Naokazu Takemoto
- Wataru Takeshita
- Tokuichiro Tamazawa
- Norihisa Tamura
- Yasufumi Tanahashi
- Kazunori Tanaka
- Ryosei Tanaka
- Koichi Tani
- Sadakazu Tanigaki
- Yaichi Tanigawa
- Takashi Tanihata
- Tatsuya Tanimoto
- Ryotaro Tanose
- Minoru Terada
- Toru Toida
- Kisaburo Tokai
- Naomi Tokashiki
- Tsutomu Tomioka
- Masatada Tsuchiya
- Shinako Tsuchiya
- Yuji Tsushima
- Kenichiro Ueno
- Toshio Ukishima
- Osamu Uno
- Hideo Usui
- Kenji Wakamiya
- Atsushi Watanabe
- Hiromichi Watanabe
- Tomoyoshi Watanabe
- Yoshimi Watanabe
- Daishiro Yamagiwa
- Taimei Yamaguchi
- Akihiko Yamamoto
- Koichi Yamamoto
- Kozo Yamamoto
- Taku Yamamoto
- Tomohiro Yamamoto
- Yuji Yamamoto
- Akiko Yamanaka
- Taku Yamasaki
- Koichi Yamauchi
- Takuji Yanagimoto
- Hakuo Yanagisawa
- Takashi Yano
- Junichiro Yasui
- Okiharu Yasuoka
- Yoshio Yatsu
- Kaoru Yosano
- Rokuzaemon Yoshida
- Takamori Yoshikawa
- Masayoshi Yoshino

==== New Komeito (20 members) ====
- Kazuyoshi Akaba
- Masao Akamatsu
- Yasuyuki Eda
- Otohiko Endo
- Yutaka Fukushima
- Noriko Furuya
- Tetsuzo Fuyushiba
- Junji Higashi
- Yasuko Ikenobo
- Yoshihisa Inoue
- Noritoshi Ishida
- Keiichi Ishii
- Wataru Ito
- Takenori Kanzaki
- Kazuo Kitagawa
- Kaori Maruya
- Keigo Masuya
- Hiroyoshi Nishi
- Yoshinori Oguchi
- Akihiro Ota
- Tetsuo Saito
- Chikara Sakaguchi
- Shigeki Sato
- Masahiro Tabata
- Michiyo Takagi
- Yosuke Takagi
- Kazufumi Taniguchi
- Takayoshi Taniguchi
- Shigeyuki Tomita
- Isamu Ueda
- Yoshio Urushibara

=== The Opposition ===
==== Democratic Party (113 members) ====
- Hirotaka Akamatsu
- Satoshi Arai
- Jun Azumi
- Yutaka Banno
- Ryuichi Doi
- Yukio Edano
- Osamu Fujimura
- Akio Fukuda
- Motohisa Furukawa
- Shinichiro Furumoto
- Kōichirō Genba
- Hitoshi Goto
- Yoshio Hachiro
- Kazuhiro Haraguchi
- Tsutomu Hata
- Yukio Hatoyama
- Hirofumi Hirano
- Hideo Hiraoka
- Ritsuo Hosokawa
- Goshi Hosono
- Koichiro Ichimura
- Motohisa Ikeda
- Takashi Ishizeki
- Tetsundo Iwakuni
- Kenta Izumi
- Hideo Jimpu
- Naoto Kan
- Seiichi Kaneta
- Koichi Kato
- Tatsuo Kawabata
- Takashi Kawamura
- Hiroshi Kawauchi
- Toru Kikawada
- Makiko Kikuta
- Shuji Kira
- Keiro Kitagami
- Kenji Kitahashi
- Tadamasa Kodaira
- Issei Koga
- Yasuko Komiyama
- Yoko Komiyama
- Shoichi Kondo
- Yosuke Kondo
- Kazuko Kori
- Sumio Mabuchi
- Yukichi Maeda
- Seiji Maehara
- Yoshio Maki
- Jin Matsubara
- Kenko Matsuki
- Daisuke Matsumoto
- Ryu Matsumoto
- Takeaki Matsumoto
- Yorihisa Matsuno
- Taizo Mikazuki
- Mitsuo Mitani
- Wakio Mitsui
- Tetsuo Morimoto
- Muneaki Murai
- Hiroyuki Nagahama
- Akihisa Nagashima
- Akira Nagatsuma
- Takashi Nagayasu
- Masaharu Nakagawa
- Hiroshi Nakai
- Hiroko Nakano
- Chinami Nishimura
- Yoshihiko Noda
- Junya Ogawa
- Hiroshi Ogushi
- Akihiro Ohata
- Katsuya Okada
- Mitsunori Okamoto
- Tenzo Okumura
- Seiji Osaka
- Atsushi Oshima
- Kazumi Ota
- Ichirō Ozawa
- Sakihito Ozawa
- Hirofumi Ryu
- Ryuzo Sasaki
- Takahiro Sasaki
- Yoshito Sengoku
- Mitsu Shimojo
- Takashi Shinohara
- Yasuhiro Sonoda
- Yoshinori Suematsu
- Katsumasa Suzuki
- Issei Tajima
- Kaname Tajima
- Miho Takai
- Yoshiaki Takaki
- Satoshi Takayama
- Koichi Takemasa
- Kenji Tamura
- Masayo Tanabu
- Makiko Tanaka
- Takuya Tasso
- Manabu Terata
- Keisuke Tsumura
- Nobutaka Tsutsui
- Akira Uchiyama
- Eiichiro Washio
- Kozo Watanabe
- Shu Watanabe
- Masahiko Yamada
- Tsuyoshi Yamaguchi
- Kazunori Yamanoi
- Kenji Yamaoka
- Katsuhiko Yokomitsu
- Hokuto Yokoyama
- Izumi Yoshida
- Michiyoshi Yunoki

==== Japan Communist Party (9 members) ====
- Seiken Akamine
- Ikuko Ishii
- Akira Kasai
- Keiji Kokuta
- Kensho Sasaki
- Kazuo Shii
- Tetsuya Shiokawa
- Chizuko Takahashi
- Hidekatsu Yoshii

==== Social Democratic Party (7 members) ====
- Tomoko Abe
- Fumihiro Himori
- Nobuto Hosaka
- Tetsuo Kanno
- Yasumasa Shigeno
- Kantoku Teruya
- Kiyomi Tsujimoto

==== The People's New Party, New Party Nippon (6 members) ====
- Masaaki Itokawa
- Hisaoki Kamei
- Shizuka Kamei
- Hosei Norota
- Makoto Taki
- Tamisuke Watanuki

==== Independents (20 members) ====
- Kenji Eda
- Taku Eto
- Yoshihisa Furukawa
- Keiji Furuya
- Takeo Hiranuma
- Kosuke Hori
- Mitsuo Horiuchi
- Takeshi Hosaka
- Masahiro Imamura
- Yohei Kono
- Hiroshi Moriyama
- Kishiro Nakamura
- Shingo Nishimura
- Seiko Noda
- Mikio Shimoji
- Muneo Suzuki
- Ryota Takeda
- Takeshi Tokuda
- Shunichi Yamaguchi
- Takahiro Yokomichi
