= Ren Sato =

Ren Sato may refer to:

- Ren Sato (politician)
- Ren Sato (racing driver)
