= Matsuzaki (surname) =

Matsuzaki (written: 松崎) is a Japanese surname. Notable people with the surname include:

- Kai Matsuzaki (松崎 快, born 1997), Japanese footballer
- Kimiyo Matsuzaki (松崎 キミ代, born 1938), Japanese table tennis player
- Rei Matsuzaki (松嵜 麗, born 1985), Japanese voice actress and singer
- Shigeru Matsuzaki (松崎 しげる, born 1949), Japanese singer and actor
- Tetsuhisa Matsuzaki (松崎 哲久, born 1950), Japanese politician
- Yuki Matsuzaki (松崎 悠希, born 1981), Japanese actor
