= Seizō Wakaizumi =

Japanese politician

- 若泉 征三
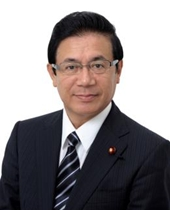

Member of the House of Representatives
- In office 30 August 2009 – 16 November 2012
- Constituency: Hokuriku-Shin'etsu PR
- In office 9 November 2003 – 8 August 2005
- Constituency: Hokuriku-Shin'etsu PR

Mayor of Imadate
- In office 1983–1999
- Preceded by: Kazuzo Maeda
- Succeeded by: Shunzō Tsujioka

Member of the Imadate Town Council
- In office 1979–1983

Personal details
- Born: 5 August 1945 (age 81) Echizen, Fukui, Japan
- Party: Democratic
- Education: Chuo University

Seizō Wakaizumi is a former Japanese politician. He attended Chuo University. He served as a member of the House of Representatives of Japan from 2003 to 2005 and again from 2009 to 2012. He also served as mayor of Imatachi. In 2012, Wakaizumi was appointed as the Parliamentary Vice-Minister for Finance.
