= Mitsuko Tomon =

Japanese politician

- 東門 美津子
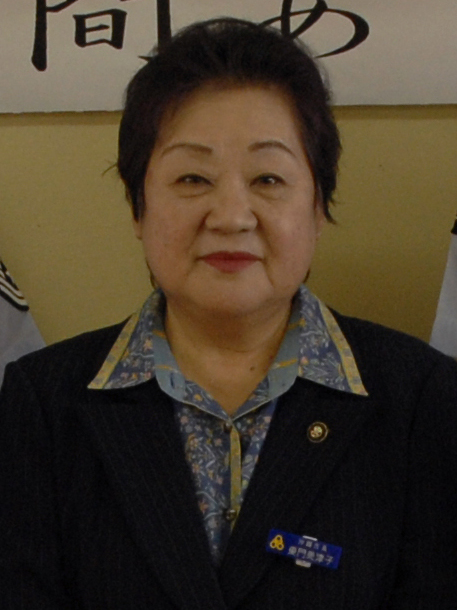
- Tomon in 2009

Mayor of Okinawa
- In office 12 May 2006 – 11 May 2014
- Preceded by: Masakazu Nakasone
- Succeeded by: Sachio Kuwae

Member of the House of Representatives
- In office 25 June 2000 – 8 August 2005
- Preceded by: Kōsuke Uehara
- Succeeded by: Multi-member district
- Constituency: Okinawa 3rd (2000–2003); Kyushu PR (2003–2005)

Vice Governor of Okinawa Prefecture
- In office 31 March 1994 – 9 December 1998 Serving with Masanori Yoshimoto (until 1997), Hiroshi Miyahira (since 1997)
- Governor: Masahide Ōta
- Preceded by: Hiroko Shō
- Succeeded by: Hirotaka Makino

Personal details
- Born: 16 November 1942 (age 83) Katsuren, Okinawa, Japan
- Party: Independent
- Other political affiliations: Social Democratic
- Education: University of the Ryukyus

Mitsuko Tomon (東門 美津子, Tōmon Mitsuko; born 16 November 1942) is a Japanese politician of the Social Democratic Party who served as the vice governor of Okinawa from 1994 to 1998.

== Political career ==
Tomon was the first woman from Okinawa to be elected to the National Diet, a position she was elected to in June 2000. She was also the mayor of Okinawa.

== Positions ==
Tomon is a supporter of the women's movement and is opposed to US military bases in Okinawa. Her stated reasons for this opposition is due to the bases' disturbing the residents of Okinawa and because of crimes committed by some of those stationed there.
