= Shigeyuki Tomita =

Japanese politician

- 富田 茂之
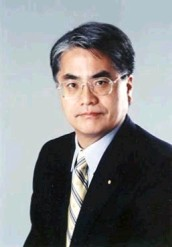
- Official portrait, 2005

Member of the House of Representatives; from Southern Kanto
- In office 9 November 2003 – 14 October 2021
- Preceded by: Multi-member district
- Succeeded by: Hideo Tsunoda
- Constituency: PR block
- In office 18 July 1993 – 2 June 2000
- Preceded by: Kiyoshi Koiwai
- Succeeded by: Multi-member district
- Constituency: Chiba 4th (1993–1996); PR block (1996–2000)

Personal details
- Born: 1 October 1953 (age 73) Chōshi, Chiba, Japan
- Party: Komeito
- Other political affiliations: CGP (1993–1994); NFP (1994–1998)
- Education: Hitotsubashi University

Shigeyuki Tomita (富田 茂之, Tomita Shigeyuki; born 1 October 1953) is a Japanese politician serving in the House of Representatives in the Diet (national legislature) as a member of the New Komeito Party. A native of Choshi, Chiba and graduate of Hitotsubashi University, he was elected for the first time in 1990.
