= Ikuko Ishii =

Japanese politician (born 1940)

- 石井 郁子

Member of the House of Representatives
- In office 20 October 1996 – 21 July 2009
- Preceded by: Constituency established
- Succeeded by: Multi-member district
- Constituency: Kinki PR
- In office 8 July 1986 – 24 January 1990
- Preceded by: Kōki Chūma
- Succeeded by: Kōki Chūma
- Constituency: Osaka 6th

Personal details
- Born: 10 October 1940 (age 85) Ashibetsu, Hokkaido, Japan
- Party: Communist
- Education: Hokkaido University
- Website: ishii-ikuko.net

Ikuko Ishii (石井 郁子, Ishii Ikuko; born 10 October 1940) is a Japanese politician and member for the House of Representatives for the Japanese Communist Party.

She was born in Hokkaido and studied there.
