= Shigeo Omae =

Japanese politician (born 1942)

- 大前 繁雄
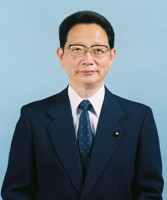
- Official portrait, 2006

Member of the House of Representatives
- In office 10 November 2003 – 21 July 2009
- Preceded by: Takako Doi
- Succeeded by: Toshirō Ishii
- Constituency: Hyōgo 7th

Member of the Hyōgo Prefectural Assembly
- In office 23 April 1979 – 9 November 2000
- Constituency: Nishinomiya City

Personal details
- Born: 28 June 1942 (age 84) Amagasaki, Hyōgo, Japan
- Education: Kyoto University

Shigeo Omae (大前 繁雄, Ōmae Shigeo; born 28 June 1942) is a retired Japanese politician of the Liberal Democratic Party, who served as a member of the House of Representatives in the Diet (national legislature).

== Early life ==
Omae is a native of Kawanishi, Hyōgo and a graduate of Kyoto University.

== Political career ==
Omae was elected to the Hyōgo Prefectural Assembly for the first time in 1979 and served six terms.

After running unsuccessfully for mayor of Nishinomiya, Hyōgo in 2000, he was elected to the House of Representatives for the first time in 2003, serving until 2009 when he was succeeded by Toshiro Ishii.
