= Tetsuhisa Matsuzaki =

Japanese politician (born 1950)

- 松崎 哲久
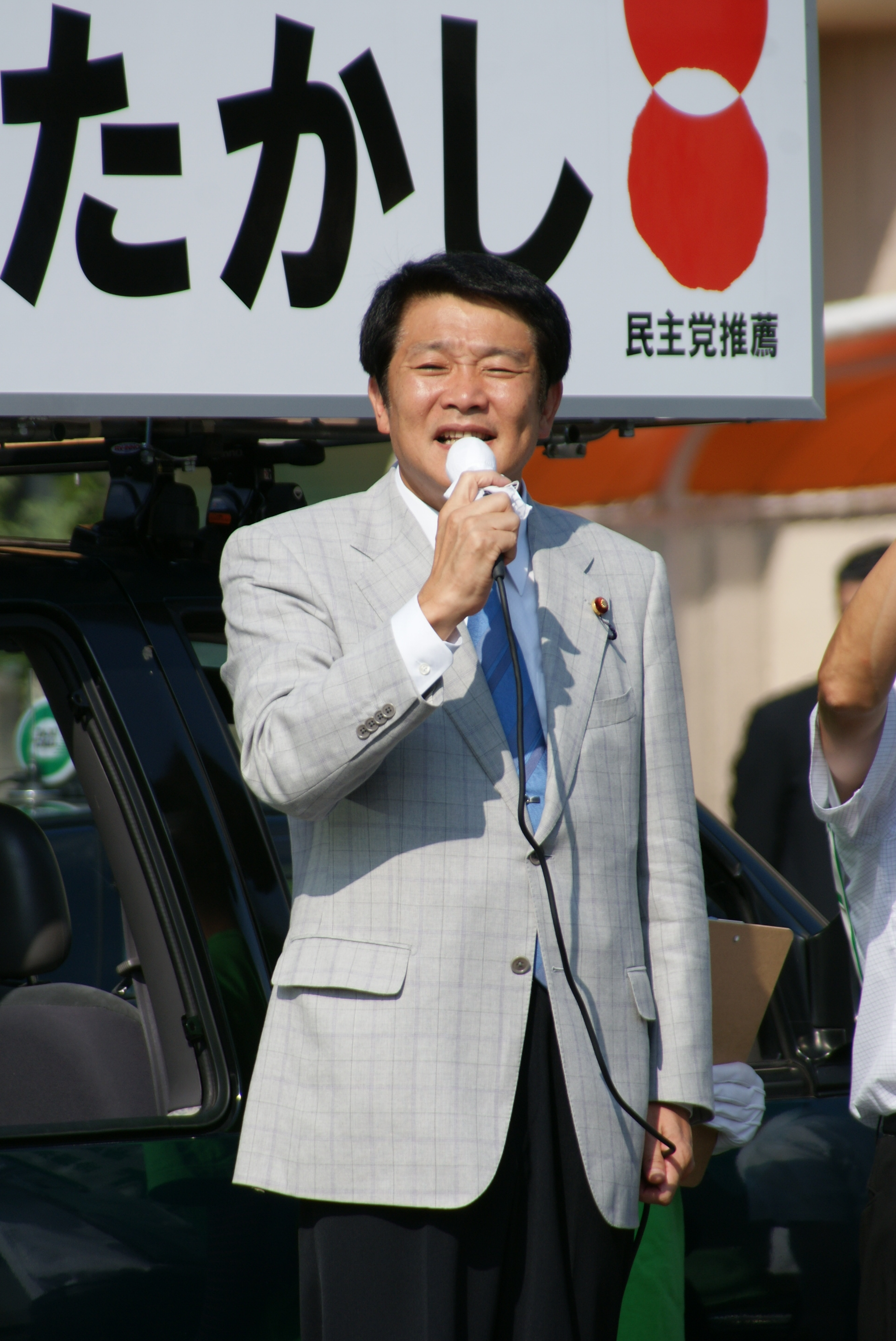
- Matsuzaki in 2010

Member of the House of Representatives
- In office 31 August 2009 – 16 November 2012
- Preceded by: Taimei Yamaguchi
- Succeeded by: Taimei Yamaguchi
- Constituency: Saitama 10th
- In office 9 September 2003 – 8 August 2005
- Constituency: Northern Kanto PR

Personal details
- Born: 14 April 1950 (age 76) Tokyo, Japan
- Party: Independent (1994–1996; 2019–present)
- Other political affiliations: LDP (before 1992); JNP (1992–1994); DP (1996–1998); DPJ (1998–2012); PLF (2012); TPJ (2012–2013); PLP (2013–2019)
- Education: University of Tokyo; Harvard University

Tetsuhisa Matsuzaki (松崎 哲久, Matsuzaki Tetsuhisa; born 14 April 1950 in Tokyo) is a former Japanese politician of the Democratic Party of Japan, who served as a member of the House of Representatives in the Diet (national legislature), representing the Saitama No. 10 District.

Matsuzaki studied law at the University of Tokyo and received an MA from Harvard University in the USA. He was elected for the first time in 2003.

== Works ==
- Jiminto Seiken by Seizaburo Sato, Tetsuhisa Matsuzaki, Chuo Koronsha, ISBN 4-12-001477-0 (4-12-001477-0)
