= Yasuhiro Sonoda =

Japanese politician

- 園田 康博
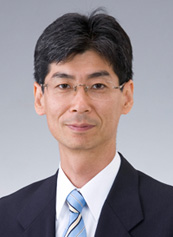
- Official portrait, 2012

Member of the House of Representatives
- In office 9 November 2003 – 16 November 2012
- Preceded by: Multi-member district
- Succeeded by: Yoji Muto
- Constituency: Tōkai PR (2003–2009); Gifu 3rd (2009–2012)

Personal details
- Born: 9 June 1967 (age 59) Amakusa, Kumamoto, Japan
- Party: Democratic
- Other political affiliations: Liberal League (1998–2000)
- Education: Nihon University; Keio University

Yasuhiro Sonoda (園田 康博, Sonoda Yasuhiro; born 9 June 1967) is a former Japanese politician who served in the House of Representatives in the Diet (national legislature) as a member of the Democratic Party of Japan.

== Early life ==
A native of Amakusa District, Kumamoto, he attended Nihon University as undergraduate and graduate students and Keio University as a research student.

== Political career ==
Sonoda was elected for the first time in 2003 after unsuccessful runs in 1998 and 2000.

Sonoda became internationally known for drinking a glass of water, collected from puddles under the reactor buildings at the radioactively polluted Fukushima Daiichi Nuclear Power Plant and then decontaminated, during a press conference in October 2011 after being challenged to do so.

Sonoda quit politics in June 2015, following a failed run in the 2014 Japanese general election.

== Post-political career ==
He served as representative director of ACD, an online shopping subsidiary of All Nippon Airways, from March 2018 to March 2020, when he was transferred to WeSearch, an ACD subsidiary.

=== Death hoax ===
In the wake of the August 2023 discharge of ALPS-decontaminated water of the Fukushima Daiichi, widespread hoaxes on the Chinese internet claimed that Sonoda died of cancer in Palau. On September 2, 2023, Sonoda was interviewed by Kyodo News via telephone, in which he "once again" apologized to the people of Fukushima – for his actions being made into a rumor. The Kyodo News was accompanied with neither an interview audio nor any latest photo of Sonoda.
