= Takeshi Hosaka =

Japanese politician (born 1945)

- 保坂 武

Mayor of Kai
- Incumbent
- Assumed office 3 October 2008
- Preceded by: Yoshimaro Fujimaki

Member of the House of Representatives
- In office 28 April 2003 – 21 September 2008
- Preceded by: Shōmei Yokouchi
- Succeeded by: Hitoshi Goto
- Constituency: Yamanashi 3rd

Speaker of the Yamanashi Prefectural Assembly
- In office 26 June 2001 – 20 March 2002

Member of the Yamanashi Prefectural Assembly
- In office 1991 – 14 March 2003
- Constituency: Nakakoma District

Personal details
- Born: 1 February 1945 (age 81) Ryūō, Yamanashi, Japan
- Party: Independent
- Other political affiliations: Liberal Democratic

Takeshi Hosaka (保坂 武, Hosaka Takeshi; born 1 February 1945) is a Japanese politician of the Liberal Democratic Party, who served as a member of the House of Representatives in the Diet (national legislature). A native of Kai, Yamanashi and high school graduate, he was elected to the town assembly of the town of Ryūō, Shiga in 1977, serving for three terms, and then to the assembly of Yamanashi Prefecture in 1991, serving for, again, three terms. In April 2003, he was elected to the House of Representatives for the first time as an independent. He represented the 3rd District of Yamanashi Prefecture until 2008.
