= Michiyo Takagi =

Japanese politician (born 1952)

- 高木 美智代
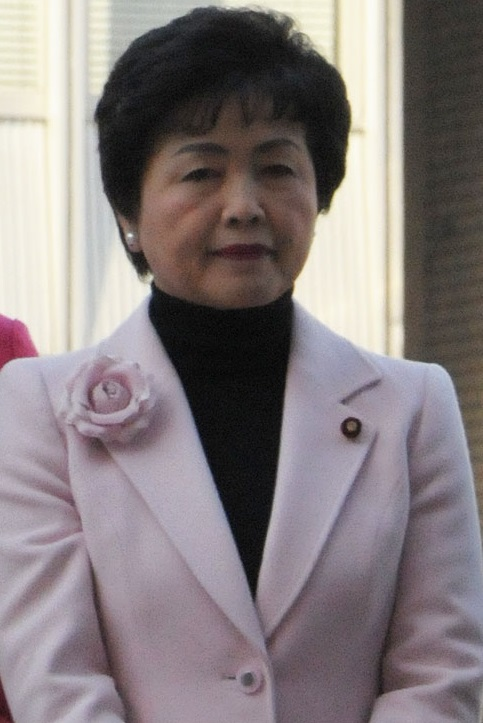
- Takagi in 2013

Member of the House of Representatives
- In office 9 November 2003 – 14 October 2021
- Preceded by: Akihiro Ota
- Succeeded by: Kōichi Kasai
- Constituency: Tokyo PR

Personal details
- Born: 13 September 1952 (age 74) Kitakyushu, Fukuoka, Japan
- Party: Komeito
- Education: Sōka University

Michiyo Takagi (高木 美智代, Takagi Michiyo; born 13 September 1952) is a Japanese politician serving in the House of Representatives in the Diet (national legislature) as a member of the New Komeito Party. A native of Kitakyushu, Fukuoka and graduate of Soka University she was elected for the first time in 2003.
