= Yoshitsugu Harada =

Japanese politician

- 原田 令嗣
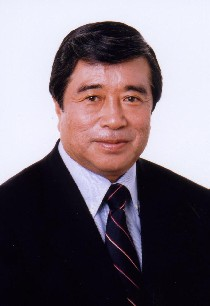
- Official portrait, 2007

Member of the House of Representatives
- In office 11 November 2003 – 21 July 2009
- Preceded by: Shōzō Harada
- Succeeded by: Shōgo Tsugawa
- Constituency: Shizuoka 2nd

Personal details
- Born: 2 February 1952 (age 74) Yaizu, Shizuoka, Japan
- Party: Liberal Democratic
- Education: Keio University

Yoshitsugu Harada (原田 令嗣, Harada Yoshitsugu; born 2 February 1952) is a former Japanese politician of the Liberal Democratic Party, who served as a member of the House of Representatives in the Diet (national legislature). A native of Yaizu, Shizuoka and graduate of Keio University, he worked at the public broadcaster NHK from 1974 to 2003. Harada served in the House of Representatives between 2003 and 2009, representing the Shizuoka 2nd district, succeeding his father Shōzō Harada.
