= Masatoshi Kurata =

Japanese politician (1939–2016)

- 倉田 雅年
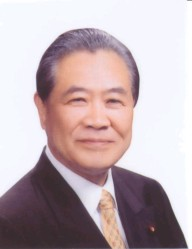
- Official portrait, 2004

Member of the House of Representatives
- In office 30 June 2000 – 21 July 2009
- Constituency: Tōkai PR

Personal details
- Born: 10 July 1939 Shimizu, Shizuoka, Japan
- Died: 21 November 2016 (aged 77) Nagaizumi, Shizuoka, Japan
- Party: Liberal Democratic
- Education: University of Tokyo

Masatoshi Kurata (倉田 雅年, Kurata Masatoshi; 10 July 1939 – 21 November 2016) was a Japanese politician of the Liberal Democratic Party, a member of the House of Representatives in the Diet (national legislature). A native of Shimizu, Shizuoka, and a graduate of the University of Tokyo, he was elected for the first time in 2000 after an unsuccessful run in 1996. He died of cancer in 2016.
