= Seiji Nakamura =

Japanese politician (1931–2018)

- 仲村 正治
- Official portrait, 2001

Member of the House of Representatives
- In office 18 February 1990 – 21 July 2009
- Preceded by: Odo Saburo
- Succeeded by: Multi-member district
- Constituency: Okinawa at-large (1990–1996); Okinawa 2nd (1996–2003); Kyushu PR (2003–2009)
- In office 18 December 1983 – 2 June 1986
- Preceded by: Odo Saburo
- Succeeded by: Odo Saburo
- Constituency: Okinawa at-large

Member of the Okinawa Prefectural Assembly
- In office 1973–1981

Member of the Naha City Assembly
- In office 1969–1973

Personal details
- Born: 16 September 1931 Naha, Okinawa, Japan
- Died: 15 November 2018 (aged 87) Naha, Okinawa, Japan
- Party: Liberal Democratic
- Other political affiliations: JRP (1993–1994); NFP (1994–1997)

Seiji Nakamura (仲村 正治, Nakamura Seiji; 6 September 1931 – 15 November 2018) was a Japanese politician who served in the House of Representatives in the Diet (national legislature) as a member of the Liberal Democratic Party.

== Biography ==
A native of Naha, Okinawa and high school graduate he was elected to the Diet for the first time in 1983 after serving in local assemblies in Okinawa.
