= Kenji Kitahashi =

Japanese politician

- 北橋 健治

Mayor of Kitakyushu
- In office 20 February 2007 – 19 February 2023
- Preceded by: Koichi Sueyoshi
- Succeeded by: Kazuhisa Takeuchi

Member of the House of Representatives
- In office 18 July 1993 – 19 December 2006
- Preceded by: Kazuaki Ozawa
- Succeeded by: Daizo Kusuda
- Constituency: Fukuoka 2nd (1993–1996); Fukuoka 9th (1996–2005); Kyushu PR (2005–2006)
- In office 8 July 1986 – 24 January 1990
- Preceded by: Sanae Miyata
- Succeeded by: Kazuaki Ozawa
- Constituency: Fukuoka 2nd

Personal details
- Born: 19 March 1953 (age 73) Nishinomiya, Hyōgo, Japan
- Party: Independent (since 2006)
- Other political affiliations: DSP (1977–1994); NFP (1994–1998); DPJ (1998–2006)
- Education: University of Tokyo

Kenji Kitahashi (北橋 健治, Kitahashi Kenji; born 19 March 1953, in Nishinomiya) is a Japanese politician and a former mayor of Kitakyushu, Japan. A graduate of the University of Tokyo, he was elected to the House of Representatives in Diet of Japan (parliament) for the first time in 1986 as a member of Democratic Socialist Party, which later became part of Democratic Party of Japan. After losing his seat in 1990, he was re-elected in 1993. In February 2007 he was elected mayor of Kitakyushu and went on to serve four terms, until 2023.
