= Yasuko Komiyama =

Japanese politician (born 1965)

- 小宮山 泰子
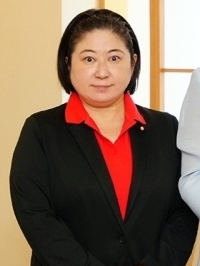
- Komiyama in 2022

Member of the House of Representatives; from Northern Kanto
- In office 9 November 2003 – 23 January 2026
- Preceded by: Kiyoshi Nakano
- Succeeded by: Hideyuki Nakano
- Constituency: See list: Saitama 7th (2003–2005); PR block (2005–2009); Saitama 7th (2009–2012); PR block (2012–2024); Saitama 7th (2024–2026)

Member of the Saitama Prefectural Assembly
- In office 30 April 1995 – 2000
- Constituency: Kawagoe City

Personal details
- Born: 25 April 1965 (age 61) Kawagoe, Saitama, Japan
- Party: CRA (since 2026)
- Other political affiliations: LDP (1995–1998); LP (1998–2003); DPJ (2003–2012); PLF (2012); TPJ (2012–2013); PLP (2013–2016); DP (2016–2017); KnT (2017–2018); DPP (2018–2020); CDP (2020–2026)
- Education: Keio University; Nihon University

Yasuko Komiyama (小宮山 泰子, Komiyama Yasuko; born 25 April 1965) is a Japanese politician of the Constitutional Democratic Party (CDP), who serves as a member of the House of Representatives in the Diet (national legislature).

== Early life ==
Komiyama is a native of Kawagoe, Saitama. She attended Keio University and received a master's degree from Nihon University.

== Political career ==
After having served in the Saitama Prefectural Assembly for two terms from 1995, she ran unsuccessfully for the House of Representatives in 2000 as an independent and in 2001 as a member of Ichirō Ozawa's Liberal Party.

She ran once again in 2003, this time as a member of the Democratic Party of Japan, and was elected for the first time.

Komiyama is part of the CDP's shadow cabinet 'Next Cabinet' as the shadow Minister of Land, Infrastructure, Transport and Tourism.
