= Masao Akamatsu =

Japanese politician (born 1945)

- 赤松 正雄
- Official portrait, 2005

Member of the House of Representatives
- In office 18 July 1993 – 16 November 2012
- Preceded by: Jūrō Matsumoto
- Succeeded by: Multi-member district
- Constituency: Hyōgo 4th (1993–1996); Kinki PR (1996–2012)

Personal details
- Born: 26 November 1945 (age 80) Himeji, Hyōgo, Japan
- Party: Komeito
- Other political affiliations: CGP (1969–1994); NFP (1994–1998)
- Education: Keio University

Masao Akamatsu (赤松 正雄, Akamatsu Masao; born 26 November 1945) is a Japanese politician of the New Komeito Party, a member of the House of Representatives in the Diet (national legislature). A native of Himeji, Hyōgo and graduate of Keio University, he was elected to the House of Representatives for the first time in 1993 after an unsuccessful run in 1990.
