= Kensho Sasaki =

Japanese politician

- 佐々木 憲昭

Member of the House of Representatives
- In office 20 October 1996 – 21 November 2014
- Preceded by: Constituency established
- Succeeded by: Nobuko Motomura
- Constituency: Tōkai PR

Personal details
- Born: 11 November 1945 (age 80) Kyōwa, Hokkaido, Japan
- Party: Communist
- Education: Osaka City University
- Website: sasaki-kensho.jp

Kensho Sasaki (佐々木 憲昭, Sasaki Kenshō; born 11 November 1945) is a Japanese politician who served as a member of the House of Representatives for the Japanese Communist Party from 1996 to 2014. He retired from his House of Representatives seat at the 2014 general election.
