= Kiyoshi Nakano =

Japanese politician (born 1936)

- 中野 清
- Official portrait, 2005

Member of the House of Representatives; from Northern Kanto
- In office 20 October 1996 – 21 July 2009
- Preceded by: Constituency established
- Succeeded by: Yasuko Komiyama
- Constituency: Saitama 7th (1996–2003); PR block (2003–2005); Saitama 7th (2005–2009)

Member of the Saitama Prefectural Assembly
- In office 1981–1993
- Constituency: Nishi 7th

Member of the Kawagoe City Council
- In office 1971–1979

Personal details
- Born: 1 January 1936 (age 90) Kawagoe, Saitama, Japan
- Party: Liberal Democratic
- Other political affiliations: New Frontier (1996–1998); Reform Club (1998–2000)
- Children: Hideyuki Nakano

Kiyoshi Nakano (中野 清, Nakano Kiyoshi; born 1 January 1936) is a retired Japanese politician who served in the House of Representatives in the Diet (national legislature) as a member of the Liberal Democratic Party. A native of Kawagoe, Saitama and graduate of Meiji University he was elected to the Diet for the first time in 1996 after serving in local assemblies in Saitama Prefecture for years.
