= Noriko Furuya =

Japanese politician (born 1956)

- 古屋 範子
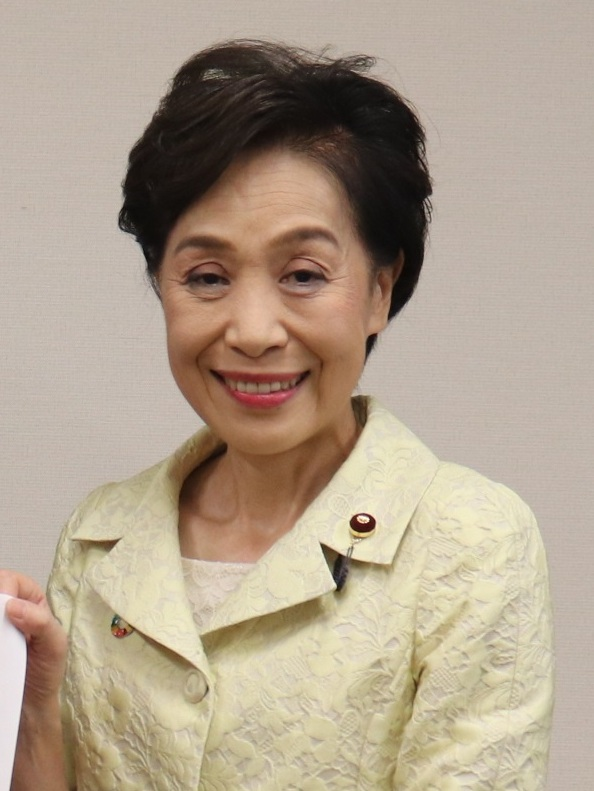
- Furuya in 2023

Member of the House of Representatives
- In office 10 November 2003 – 9 October 2024
- Preceded by: Multi-member district
- Succeeded by: Mitsuko Numazaki
- Constituency: Southern Kanto PR

Personal details
- Born: 14 May 1956 (age 70) Urawa, Saitama, Japan
- Party: Komeito
- Education: Waseda University

Noriko Furuya (古屋 範子, Furuya Noriko; born 14 May 1956) is a Japanese politician who served in the House of Representatives as a member of the Komeito Party. Furuya is from Urawa, Saitama and a graduate of Waseda University, she was elected to the House of Representatives for the first time in 2003.
