= Kyogon Hagiyama =

Japanese politician (1932–2015)

- 萩山 教嚴
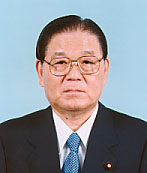
- Official portrait, 2001

Member of the House of Representatives; from Hokuriku-Shin'etsu
- In office 19 February 1990 – 21 July 2009
- Preceded by: Seiichi Kataoka
- Succeeded by: Multi-member district
- Constituency: Toyama 2nd (1990–1996); PR block (1996–2009)

Member of the Toyama Prefectural Assembly
- In office 1971–1979
- Constituency: Himi City

Personal details
- Born: 20 March 1932 Hakui, Ishikawa, Japan
- Died: 13 October 2015 (aged 83)
- Party: Liberal Democratic
- Education: Ritsumeikan University

Kyogon Hagiyama (萩山 教嚴, Hagiyama Kyōgon; 20 March 1932 – 13 October 2015) was a Japanese politician of the Liberal Democratic Party, a member of the House of Representatives in the Diet (national legislature). A native of Himi, Toyama and graduate of Ritsumeikan University, he was elected to the assembly of Toyama Prefecture for the first time in 1971.

From 1979 to 1986 he ran four times for seats in the House of Representatives, albeit unsuccessfully. He was elected for the first time in 1990.
