= Ren Sato (politician) =

Japanese politician

- 佐藤 錬

Member of the House of Representatives
- In office 9 November 2003 – 16 November 2009
- Constituency: Kyushu PR

Member of the Ōita Prefectural Assembly
- In office 1991–2000
- Constituency: Nakatsu City

Personal details
- Born: 15 July 1951 (age 75) Usa, Ōita, Japan
- Party: Liberal Democratic
- Education: Meiji University

Ren Sato (佐藤 錬, Satō Ren; born 15 July 1951) is a Japanese politician belonging to the Liberal Democratic Party, and a former member of the House of Representatives in the Diet (national legislature).

== Early life ==
Sato is a native of Usa District, Ōita. He graduated from Nakatsu-kita High School, and then attended Meiji University, where he graduated from the Faculty of Law.

== Career ==
In 1974, after graduating from Meiji University, Sato worked for Lawmaker Masumi Esaki as a Secretary of the House of Representatives (assistant to member).

In 1985 he was appointed as Director of Nakatsu Cosmos Electric Co., Ltd.

Finally, in 2001, after his first failed run for the House of Representatives, Sato was appointed as the Chairman of the Oita Prefecture Shaolin Temple Kempo Federation.

== Political career ==
Sato’s first attempt at becoming a politician was when he ran unsuccessfully for mayor of Nakatsu, Ōita in 1987. Finally, in 1991, he achieved his first political success when he was elected to the assembly of Ōita Prefecture, representing the Nakatsu City constituency. He served three terms until 2000.

After an initial unsuccessful run in 2000, Sato was elected to the House of Representatives for the first time in 2003. He served two terms until 2009.

During his first term, Sato served on the Special Committee on Security, the Special Committee on Youth Issues, and the Special Committee on Dealing with Armed Attacks.
