= Results of the 2005 Japanese general election =

- 11 September 2005
- All 480 seats in the House of Representatives; 241 seats needed for a majority
Party	Leader	Seats	+/–
LDP	Junichiro Koizumi	296	+54
Democratic	Katsuya Okada	113	−65
New Kōmeitō	Takenori Kanzaki	31	−3
JCP	Kazuo Shii	9	0
Social Democratic	Mizuho Fukushima	7	+1
People's New	Tamisuke Watanuki	2	New
NP-Daichi	Muneo Suzuki	1	New
NP-Nippon	Yasuo Tanaka	1	New
Independents	–	18	+7
This lists parties that won seats. See the complete results below.
- Constituency seats
- All 300 seats
- Turnout: 59.85% (▼7.66pp)
Party	Vote %	Seats	+/–
LDP	47.77	219	+51
Democratic	36.44	52	−53
Social Democratic	1.46	1	0
New Kōmeitō	1.44	8	−1
People's New	0.64	4	New
Independents	–	18	+7
This lists parties that won seats. See the complete results below.
- Proportional seats
- All 180 seats
- Turnout: 59.80% (▼7.66pp)
Party	Vote %	Seats	+/–
LDP	38.18	77	+8
Democratic	31.02	61	−11
New Kōmeitō	13.25	23	−2
JCP	7.25	9	0
Social Democratic	5.49	6	0
NP-Nippon	2.42	1	New
People's New	1.74	2	New
NP-Daichi	0.64	1	New
This lists parties that won seats. See the complete results below.
Results by constituency and PR seats, shaded according to vote strength
Prime Minister before	Prime Minister after
Junichiro Koizumi; LDP	Junichiro Koizumi; LDP

This article presents detailed results of the 2005 Japanese general election. The results are separated into each of the eleven proportional representation blocks and their corresponding prefectures. In the following tables, candidates elected via single-member district are highlighted in green, while candidates elected via proportional representation are highlighted in red.

== Electoral system ==
The House of Representatives is elected via parallel voting. In the 2005 election, 300 members were elected in single-member districts and 180 via party-list proportional representation in eleven multi-member constituencies, referred to as "PR blocks". Single-member districts are apportioned between prefectures and numbered (1st, 2nd, etc). Candidates may run solely in a single-member district, solely in PR, or both (dual listing). Dual listed candidates must win at least 10% of the vote in their single-member district in order to be eligible for election via PR. Dual listed candidates who win their single-member district race are not eligible for election via PR.

Candidates on PR lists may be ranked sequentially or, if they are dual listed, ranked equally with one another. If ranked equally, the best-loser ratio (sekihairitsu) of each candidate determines the order of election. This number is determined by dividing their single-member district votes by those of the winning candidate in that district. In this way, the losing candidates who performed best will be elected first.

If a party wins more PR seats than they have eligible candidates on their list, the unfilled seats will be distributed to other parties in accordance with the PR formula.

== Hokkaido block ==
2005 Japanese general election in Hokkaido
- 11 September 2005

All 20 seats to the House of Representatives
	Majority party	Minority party
Party	DPJ	LDP
Last election	11 seats	8 seats
Constituency	8	4
PR seats	3	3
Total	11	7
Seat change	0	▼1
	Third party	Fourth party
Party	Daichi	Komei
Last election	New	1 seat
Constituency	0	0
PR seats	1	1
Total	1	1
Seat change	▲1	0

Single-member constituency results in Hokkaido
Constituency	Previous member		Elected member		Votes	%	Margin	Runner-up		%	Status
Hokkaido 1st	Takahiro Yokomichi	DPJ	Takahiro Yokomichi	DPJ	143,564	45.7	15,398	Takayuki Mishina	LDP	40.8	DPJ hold
Hokkaido 2nd	Wakio Mitsui	DPJ	Wakio Mitsui	DPJ	129,357	45.3	2,326	Takamori Yoshikawa	LDP	44.5	DPJ hold
Hokkaido 3rd	Satoshi Arai	DPJ	Gaku Ishizaki	LDP	138,765	48.4	13,320	Satoshi Arai	DPJ	43.7	LDP gain from DPJ
Hokkaido 4th	Yoshio Hachiro	DPJ	Yoshio Hachiro	DPJ	108,023	47.2	7,853	Shizuo Sato	LDP	43.8	DPJ hold
Hokkaido 5th	Nobutaka Machimura	LDP	Nobutaka Machimura	LDP	173,947	54.2	49,400	Chiyomi Kobayashi	DPJ	38.8	LDP hold
Hokkaido 6th	Hiroshi Imazu	LDP	Takahiro Sasaki	DPJ	143,860	46.7	2,761	Eiko Kaneta	LDP	45.8	DPJ gain from LDP
Hokkaido 7th	Naoto Kitamura	LDP	Hiroko Nakano	DPJ	95,473	48.3	8,549	Naoto Kitamura	LDP	43.9	DPJ gain from LDP
Hokkaido 8th	Seiichi Kaneta	DPJ	Seiichi Kaneta	DPJ	134,963	49.8	20,822	Kenji Sato	LDP	42.1	DPJ hold
Hokkaido 9th	Yukio Hatoyama	DPJ	Yukio Hatoyama	DPJ	150,050	49.3	18,920	Hirofumi Iwakura	LDP	43.1	DPJ hold
Hokkaido 10th	Tadamasa Kodaira	DPJ	Tadamasa Kodaira	DPJ	109,422	40.9	30,818	Takafumi Yamashita	Ind.	29.4	DPJ hold
Hokkaido 11th	Shōichi Nakagawa	LDP	Shōichi Nakagawa	LDP	107,056	51.6	22,430	Tomohiro Ishikawa	DPJ	40.6	LDP hold
Hokkaido 12th	Tsutomu Takebe	LDP	Tsutomu Takebe	LDP	124,465	51.6	22,630	Kenko Matsuki	DPJ	42.2	LDP hold

Proportional representation results
Party	Votes	Seats	Rank	Elected member	Constituency	Ratio
DPJ	1,090,727 (33.8%)	3	1	Seiji Osaka		
DPJ	1,090,727 (33.8%)	3	2	Satoshi Arai	Hokkaido 3rd	90.4%
DPJ	1,090,727 (33.8%)	3	2	Kenko Matsuki	Hokkaido 12th	81.8%
LDP	940,705 (29.1%)	3	1	Yukari Iijima	Hokkaido 10th	56.7%
LDP	940,705 (29.1%)	3	2	Hiroshi Imazu		
LDP	940,705 (29.1%)	3	3	Takamori Yoshikawa	Hokkaido 2nd	98.2%
Daichi	433,938 (13.4%)	1	1	Muneo Suzuki		
Komei	368,552 (11.4%)	1	1	Kaori Maruya		

== Tohoku block ==
2005 Japanese general election in Tohoku
- 11 September 2005

All 39 seats to the House of Representatives
	Majority party	Minority party	Third party
Party	LDP	DPJ	Komei
Last election	20 seats	13 seats	1 seat
Constituency	17	7	0
PR seats	6	5	1
Total	23	12	1
Seat change	▲3	▼1	0
	Fourth party	Fifth party	Sixth party
Party	SDP	JCP	Ind.
Last election	1 seat	1 seat	2 seats
Constituency	0	0	1
PR seats	1	1	–
Total	1	1	1
Seat change	0	0	▼1

Single-member constituency results in Tohoku
Constituency	Previous member		Elected member		Votes	%	Margin	Runner-up		%	! Status
Aomori 1st	Yūji Tsushima	LDP	Yūji Tsushima	LDP	94,072	40.4	14,749	Hokuto Yokoyama	DPJ	34.1	LDP hold
Aomori 2nd	Akinori Eto	LDP	Akinori Eto	LDP	89,887	58.3	43,763	Tomonobu Nakamura	DPJ	29.9	LDP hold
Aomori 3rd	Tadamori Ōshima	LDP	Tadamori Ōshima	LDP	90,925	53.1	17,079	Masayo Tanabu	DPJ	43.1	LDP hold
Aomori 4th	Tarō Kimura	LDP	Tarō Kimura	LDP	113,704	55.9	72,215	Osamu Shibutani	DPJ	20.4	LDP hold
Iwate 1st	Takuya Tasso	DPJ	Takuya Tasso	DPJ	95,109	51.7	29,922	Atsushi Oikawa	LDP	35.4	DPJ hold
Iwate 2nd	Shun'ichi Suzuki	LDP	Shun'ichi Suzuki	LDP	116,448	55.3	22,353	Koji Hata	DPJ	44.7	LDP hold
Iwate 3rd	Toru Kikawada	DPJ	Toru Kikawada	DPJ	102,477	55.1	32,660	Hidenori Hashimoto	LDP	37.5	DPJ hold
Iwate 4th	Ichirō Ozawa	DPJ	Ichirō Ozawa	DPJ	124,578	59.9	76,485	Tokuichiro Tamazawa	LDP	23.1	DPJ hold
Miyagi 1st	Vacant	DPJ	Tōru Doi	LDP	117,236	47.3	1,972	Kazuko Kōri	DPJ	46.5	LDP gain from DPJ
Miyagi 2nd	Kenya Akiba	LDP	Kenya Akiba	LDP	130,257	52.8	31,612	Yukiko Monma	DPJ	40.0	LDP hold
Miyagi 3rd	Akihiro Nishimura	LDP	Akihiro Nishimura	LDP	98,269	52.3	19,766	Kiyohito Hashimoto	DPJ	41.8	LDP hold
Miyagi 4th	Shintaro Ito	LDP	Shintaro Ito	LDP	114,245	54.5	35,618	Keiki Ishiyama	DPJ	37.5	LDP hold
Miyagi 5th	Jun Azumi	DPJ	Jun Azumi	DPJ	78,205	50.7	9,720	Masami Saito	LDP	44.4	DPJ hold
Miyagi 6th	Itsunori Onodera	LDP	Itsunori Onodera	LDP	100,359	63.5	51,096	Tetsuo Kanno	SDP	31.2	LDP hold
Akita 1st	Manabu Terata	DPJ	Manabu Terata	DPJ	77,135	44.4	8,609	Koji Futada	LDP	39.4	DPJ hold
Akita 2nd	Hosei Norota	Ind.	Hosei Norota	Ind.	80,974	37.6	27,419	Takaki Ono	LDP	24.9	Ind. hold
Akita 3rd	Nobuhide Minorikawa	LDP	Nobuhide Minorikawa	LDP	114,228	41.3	31,748	Kimiko Kyono	DPJ	29.8	LDP hold
Yamagata 1st	Toshiaki Endo	LDP	Toshiaki Endo	LDP	125,774	56.4	39,019	Michihiko Kano	DPJ	38.9	LDP hold
Yamagata 2nd	Takehiko Endo	LDP	Takehiko Endo	LDP	142,342	54.8	25,131	Yōsuke Kondō	DPJ	45.2	LDP hold
Yamagata 3rd	Koichi Kato	LDP	Koichi Kato	LDP	159,486	69.6	110,429	Onoichi Ito	SDP	21.4	LDP hold
Fukushima 1st	Tatsuo Sato	LDP	Yoshitami Kameoka	LDP	171,507	56.8	61,712	Shinichiro Ishihara	DPJ	36.4	LDP hold
Fukushima 2nd	Takumi Nemoto	LDP	Takumi Nemoto	LDP	125,447	52.8	24,498	Teruhiko Mashiko	DPJ	42.5	LDP hold
Fukushima 3rd	Kōichirō Genba	DPJ	Kōichirō Genba	DPJ	143,850	68.6	77,854	Susumu Hasumi	LDP	31.4	DPJ hold
Fukushima 4th	Kōzō Watanabe	DPJ	Kōzō Watanabe	DPJ	91,440	48.5	6,637	Atsushi Watanabe	LDP	45.0	DPJ hold
Fukushima 5th	Goji Sakamoto	LDP	Masayoshi Yoshino	LDP	112,808	47.6	19,873	Izumi Yoshida	DPJ	39.2	LDP hold

Proportional representation results
Party	Votes	Seats	Rank	Elected member	Constituency	Ratio
LDP	1,901,595 (36.5%)	6	1	Goji Sakamoto		
LDP	1,901,595 (36.5%)	6	2	Masashi Nakano		
LDP	1,901,595 (36.5%)	6	3	Tatsuo Sato		
LDP	1,901,595 (36.5%)	6	4	Tokuichiro Tamazawa	Iwate 4th	38.6%
LDP	1,901,595 (36.5%)	6	5	Atsushi Watanabe	Fukushima 4th	92.7%
LDP	1,901,595 (36.5%)	6	5	Koji Futada	Akita 1st	88.8%
DPJ	1,748,165 (33.6%)	5	1	Kazuko Kōri	Miyagi 1st	98.3%
DPJ	1,748,165 (33.6%)	5	1	Hokuto Yokoyama	Aomori 1st	84.3%
DPJ	1,748,165 (33.6%)	5	1	Izumi Yoshida	Fukushima 5th	82.3%
DPJ	1,748,165 (33.6%)	5	1	Yōsuke Kondō	Yamagata 2nd	82.3%
DPJ	1,748,165 (33.6%)	5	1	Masayo Tanabu	Aomori 3rd	81.2%
Komei	620,638 (11.9%)	1	1	Yoshihisa Inoue		
SDP	362,523 (7.0%)	1	1	Tetsuo Kanno	Miyagi 6th	49.0%
JCP	325,176 (6.2%)	1	1	Chizuko Takahashi		

== Northern Kanto block ==
2005 Japanese general election in Northern Kanto
- 11 September 2005

All 52 seats to the House of Representatives
	Majority party	Minority party	Third party
Party	LDP	DPJ	Komei
Last election	31 seats	17 seats	3 seats
Constituency	27	4	0
PR seats	9	7	2
Total	36	11	2
Seat change	▲5	▼6	▼1
	Fourth party	Fifth party	Sixth party
Party	JCP	SDP	Ind.
Last election	1 seat	0 seats	0 seats
Constituency	0	0	1
PR seats	1	1	–
Total	1	1	1
Seat change	0	▲1	▲1

Single-member constituency results in Northern Kanto
Constituency	Previous member		Elected member		Votes	%	Margin	Runner-up		%	Status
Ibaraki 1st	Norihiko Akagi	LDP	Norihiko Akagi	LDP	144,499	58.3	57,500	Nobuyuki Fukushima	DPJ	35.1	LDP hold
Ibaraki 2nd	Fukushiro Nukaga	LDP	Fukushiro Nukaga	LDP	138,728	64.7	73,460	Makoto Kobayashi	DPJ	30.5	LDP hold
Ibaraki 3rd	Yasuhiro Hanashi	LDP	Yasuhiro Hanashi	LDP	113,977	46.8	31,136	Toshiaki Koizumi	DPJ	34.0	LDP hold
Ibaraki 4th	Hiroshi Kajiyama	LDP	Hiroshi Kajiyama	LDP	122,200	63.2	62,259	Mamoru Takano	DPJ	31.0	LDP hold
Ibaraki 5th	Akihiro Ohata	DPJ	Akihiro Ohata	DPJ	74,753	49.4	4,655	Hideaki Okabe	LDP	46.3	DPJ hold
Ibaraki 6th	Yuya Niwa	LDP	Yuya Niwa	LDP	141,212	56.6	64,414	Ryoji Kawaguchi	DPJ	30.8	LDP hold
Ibaraki 7th	Vacant	LDP	Kishirō Nakamura	Ind.	89,099	42.1	7,869	Keiko Nagaoka	LDP	38.4	Ind. gain from LDP
Tochigi 1st	Hajime Funada	LDP	Hajime Funada	LDP	141,868	55.4	38,111	Hiroko Mizushima	DPJ	40.5	LDP hold
Tochigi 2nd	Mayumi Moriyama	LDP	Mayumi Moriyama	LDP	99,115	53.3	12,297	Akio Fukuda	DPJ	46.7	LDP hold
Tochigi 3rd	Yoshimi Watanabe	LDP	Yoshimi Watanabe	LDP	98,889	64.0	57,113	Takashi Kobayashi	DPJ	27.0	LDP hold
Tochigi 4th	Tsutomu Sato	LDP	Tsutomu Sato	LDP	140,304	54.2	31,831	Kenji Yamaoka	DPJ	41.9	LDP hold
Tochigi 5th	Toshimitsu Motegi	LDP	Toshimitsu Motegi	LDP	125,773	68.9	69,093	Yoshitada Tomioka	DPJ	31.1	LDP hold
Gunma 1st	Kōji Omi	LDP	Genichiro Sata	LDP	136,920	55.8	58,376	Hitoshi Takahashi	DPJ	32.0	LDP hold
Gunma 2nd	Takashi Sasagawa	LDP	Takashi Sasagawa	LDP	99,919	47.3	1,422	Takashi Ishizeki	DPJ	46.6	LDP hold
Gunma 3rd	Yoshio Yatsu	LDP	Yoshio Yatsu	LDP	111,034	58.1	41,300	Masaaki Kakinuma	DPJ	36.5	LDP hold
Gunma 4th	Yasuo Fukuda	LDP	Yasuo Fukuda	LDP	118,517	62.8	62,153	Masaki Nakajima	DPJ	29.9	LDP hold
Gunma 5th	Yūko Obuchi	LDP	Yūko Obuchi	LDP	144,782	67.8	92,388	Kunihiko Tajima	DPJ	24.6	LDP hold
Saitama 1st	Koichi Takemasa	DPJ	Koichi Takemasa	DPJ	115,262	44.2	2,922	Zenjiro Kaneko	LDP	43.1	DPJ hold
Saitama 2nd	Katsuyuki Ishida	DPJ	Yoshitaka Shindō	LDP	138,376	51.8	33,296	Katsuyuki Ishida	DPJ	39.3	LDP gain from DPJ
Saitama 3rd	Ritsuo Hosokawa	DPJ	Hiroshi Imai	LDP	140,010	51.3	30,194	Ritsuo Hosokawa	DPJ	40.3	LDP gain from DPJ
Saitama 4th	Hideo Jinpu	DPJ	Chuko Hayakawa	LDP	103,366	48.8	17,137	Hideo Jinpu	DPJ	40.7	LDP gain from DPJ
Saitama 5th	Yukio Edano	DPJ	Yukio Edano	DPJ	103,014	48.7	11,542	Hideki Makihara	LDP	43.2	DPJ hold
Saitama 6th	Atsushi Oshima	DPJ	Atsushi Oshima	DPJ	123,159	45.6	1,494	Kazuyuki Nakane	LDP	45.1	DPJ hold
Saitama 7th	Yasuko Komiyama	DPJ	Kiyoshi Nakano	LDP	122,274	48.8	15,732	Yasuko Komiyama	DPJ	42.5	LDP gain from DPJ
Saitama 8th	Masahiko Shibayama	LDP	Masahiko Shibayama	LDP	115,223	52.5	38,869	Atsushi Kinoshita	DPJ	34.8	LDP hold
Saitama 9th	Matsushige Ono	LDP	Matsushige Ono	LDP	139,211	53.8	41,863	Fumihiko Igarashi	DPJ	37.6	LDP hold
Saitama 10th	Taimei Yamaguchi	LDP	Taimei Yamaguchi	LDP	117,477	55.0	38,899	Tetsuhisa Matsuzaki	DPJ	36.8	LDP hold
Saitama 11th	Ryuji Koizumi	Ind.	Etsuji Arai	LDP	97,928	40.1	4,920	Ryuji Koizumi	Ind.	38.1	LDP gain from Ind.
Saitama 12th	Toshio Masuda	LDP	Toshio Kojima	LDP	129,783	56.0	45,078	Hiranao Honda	DPJ	36.5	LDP hold
Saitama 13th	Shinako Tsuchiya	LDP	Shinako Tsuchiya	LDP	124,494	54.1	38,875	Yuriko Takeyama	DPJ	37.2	LDP hold
Saitama 14th	Takashi Mitsubayashi	LDP	Takashi Mitsubayashi	LDP	128,642	53.1	36,058	Jou Nakano	DPJ	38.2	LDP hold
Saitama 15th	Satoshi Takayama	DPJ	Ryosei Tanaka	LDP	106,961	49.0	21,685	Satoshi Takayama	DPJ	39.1	LDP gain from DPJ

Proportional representation results
Party	Votes	Seats	Rank	Elected member	Constituency	Ratio
LDP	2,892,780 (40.2%)	9	1	Kōji Omi		
LDP	2,892,780 (40.2%)	9	2	Koya Nishikawa		
LDP	2,892,780 (40.2%)	9	3	Kazuyuki Nakane	Saitama 6th	98.7%
LDP	2,892,780 (40.2%)	9	3	Zenjiro Kaneko	Saitama 1st	97.4%
LDP	2,892,780 (40.2%)	9	3	Hideaki Okabe	Ibaraki 5th	93.7%
LDP	2,892,780 (40.2%)	9	3	Keiko Nagaoka	Ibaraki 7th	93.7%
LDP	2,892,780 (40.2%)	9	3	Hideki Makihara	Saitama 5th	88.7%
LDP	2,892,780 (40.2%)	9	34	Fukuyo Nakamori		
LDP	2,892,780 (40.2%)	9	35	Masayoshi Namiki		
DPJ	2,260,717 (31.5%)	7	1	Takashi Ishizeki	Gunma 2nd	98.5%
DPJ	2,260,717 (31.5%)	7	1	Akio Fukuda	Tochigi 2nd	87.5%
DPJ	2,260,717 (31.5%)	7	1	Yasuko Komiyama	Saitama 7th	87.1%
DPJ	2,260,717 (31.5%)	7	1	Hideo Jinpu	Saitama 4th	83.4%
DPJ	2,260,717 (31.5%)	7	1	Satoshi Takayama	Saitama 15th	79.7%
DPJ	2,260,717 (31.5%)	7	1	Ritsuo Hosokawa	Saitama 3rd	78.4%
DPJ	2,260,717 (31.5%)	7	1	Kenji Yamaoka	Tochigi 4th	77.3%
Komei	937,345 (13.0%)	2	1	Keiichi Ishii		
Komei	937,345 (13.0%)	2	2	Otohiko Endō		
JCP	477,958 (6.6%)	1	1	Tetsuya Shiokawa	Saitama 8th	24.1%
SDP	323,979 (4.5%)	1	4	Fumihiro Himori		

== Southern Kanto block ==
2005 Japanese general election in Southern Kanto
- 11 September 2005

All 56 seats to the House of Representatives
	Majority party	Minority party	Third party
Party	LDP	DPJ	Komei
Last election	24 seats	26 seats	4 seats
Constituency	28	2	1
PR seats	10	7	3
Total	38	9	4
Seat change	▲14	▼17	0
	Fourth party	Fifth party	Sixth party
Party	JCP	SDP	Ind.
Last election	1 seat	1 seat	0 seats
Constituency	0	0	3
PR seats	1	1	–
Total	1	1	3
Seat change	0	0	▲3

Single-member constituency results in Southern Kanto
Constituency	Previous member		Elected member		Votes	%	Margin	Runner-up		%	Status
Chiba 1st	Kaname Tajima	DPJ	Hideo Usui	LDP	124,292	51.1	18,833	Kaname Tajima	DPJ	43.4	LDP gain from DPJ
Chiba 2nd	Hisayasu Nagata	DPJ	Akiko Yamanaka	LDP	124,261	46.9	11,318	Hisayasu Nagata	DPJ	42.6	LDP gain from DPJ
Chiba 3rd	Kazumasa Okajima	DPJ	Hirokazu Matsuno	LDP	108,937	53.2	23,230	Kazumasa Okajima	DPJ	41.9	LDP gain from DPJ
Chiba 4th	Yoshihiko Noda	DPJ	Yoshihiko Noda	DPJ	129,834	44.9	944	Mikio Fujita	LDP	44.6	DPJ hold
Chiba 5th	Hirotami Murakoshi	DPJ	Kentaro Sonoura	LDP	132,691	54.1	38,163	Hirotami Murakoshi	DPJ	38.5	LDP gain from DPJ
Chiba 6th	Yukio Ubukata	DPJ	Hiromichi Watanabe	LDP	112,397	52.9	29,761	Yukio Ubukata	DPJ	38.9	LDP gain from DPJ
Chiba 7th	Akira Uchiyama	DPJ	Kazumi Matsumoto	LDP	118,801	49.1	14,171	Akira Uchiyama	DPJ	43.2	LDP gain from DPJ
Chiba 8th	Kimiaki Matsuzaki	DPJ	Yoshitaka Sakurada	LDP	128,659	51.9	29,455	Kimiaki Matsuzaki	DPJ	40.0	LDP gain from DPJ
Chiba 9th	Kenichi Mizuno	LDP	Kenichi Mizuno	LDP	140,838	56.9	61,324	Hiroshi Sudo	DPJ	32.1	LDP hold
Chiba 10th	Motoo Hayashi	LDP	Motoo Hayashi	LDP	128,174	56.3	38,991	Hajime Yatagawa	DPJ	39.2	LDP hold
Chiba 11th	Eisuke Mori	LDP	Eisuke Mori	LDP	145,176	62.6	74,587	Masahide Tsuchiya	DPJ	30.5	LDP hold
Chiba 12th	Yasukazu Hamada	LDP	Yasukazu Hamada	LDP	143,780	57.6	51,169	Ai Aoki	DPJ	37.1	LDP hold
Chiba 13th	Yukio Jitsukawa	LDP	Yukio Jitsukawa	LDP	106,994	54.4	31,085	Yasuhiko Wakai	DPJ	38.6	LDP hold
Kanagawa 1st	Jun Matsumoto	LDP	Jun Matsumoto	LDP	161,702	58.3	66,101	Kenichiro Sato	DPJ	34.4	LDP hold
Kanagawa 2nd	Yoshihide Suga	LDP	Yoshihide Suga	LDP	160,111	58.4	68,388	Akira Oide	DPJ	33.5	LDP hold
Kanagawa 3rd	Hachiro Okonogi	LDP	Hachiro Okonogi	LDP	131,831	53.2	55,206	Naohiko Kato	DPJ	30.9	LDP hold
Kanagawa 4th	Hisako Ōishi	DPJ	Jun Hayashi	LDP	119,618	52.5	41,292	Hisako Ōishi	DPJ	34.4	LDP gain from DPJ
Kanagawa 5th	Keishu Tanaka	DPJ	Manabu Sakai	LDP	151,617	51.1	36,801	Keishu Tanaka	DPJ	38.7	LDP gain from DPJ
Kanagawa 6th	Isamu Ueda	Komei	Isamu Ueda	Komei	123,040	49.9	20,611	Motohisa Ikeda	DPJ	41.5	Komei hold
Kanagawa 7th	Nobuhiko Suto	DPJ	Tsuneo Suzuki	LDP	145,371	57.1	52,650	Nobuhiko Suto	DPJ	36.4	LDP gain from DPJ
Kanagawa 8th	Tetsundo Iwakuni	DPJ	Kenji Eda	Ind.	88,098	34.8	9,238	Tetsundo Iwakuni	DPJ	31.2	Ind. gain from DPJ
Kanagawa 9th	Hirofumi Ryu	DPJ	Koichi Yamauchi	LDP	86,673	46.6	3,795	Hirofumi Ryu	DPJ	44.5	LDP gain from DPJ
Kanagawa 10th	Kazunori Tanaka	LDP	Kazunori Tanaka	LDP	160,669	56.4	71,644	Keikou Hakariya	DPJ	31.3	LDP hold
Kanagawa 11th	Junichiro Koizumi	LDP	Junichiro Koizumi	LDP	197,037	73.2	146,486	Tsuyoshi Saito	DPJ	18.8	LDP hold
Kanagawa 12th	Ikko Nakatsuka	DPJ	Ikuzo Sakurai	LDP	108,898	46.9	33,033	Ikko Nakatsuka	DPJ	32.7	LDP gain from DPJ
Kanagawa 13th	Akira Amari	LDP	Akira Amari	LDP	174,361	61.1	86,191	Ryushi Tsuchida	DPJ	30.9	LDP hold
Kanagawa 14th	Hirohisa Fujii	DPJ	Jiro Akama	LDP	135,719	50.9	28,111	Hirohisa Fujii	DPJ	40.4	LDP gain from DPJ
Kanagawa 15th	Taro Kono	LDP	Taro Kono	LDP	186,770	63.9	103,280	Koichiro Katsumata	DPJ	28.6	LDP hold
Kanagawa 16th	Yoshiyuki Kamei	LDP	Yoshiyuki Kamei	LDP	159,268	59.3	71,277	Hidetomo Nagata	DPJ	32.7	LDP hold
Kanagawa 17th	Yōhei Kōno	LDP	Yōhei Kōno	LDP	169,825	60.7	79,924	Naoto Sakaguchi	DPJ	32.1	LDP hold
Kanagawa 18th	Takeshi Hidaka	DPJ	Daishiro Yamagiwa	LDP	111,787	53.7	33,910	Takeshi Hidaka	DPJ	37.4	LDP gain from DPJ
Yamanashi 1st	Sakihito Ozawa	DPJ	Sakihito Ozawa	DPJ	70,281	47.5	4,855	Masaaki Akaike	LDP	44.2	DPJ hold
Yamanashi 2nd	Mitsuo Horiuchi	Ind.	Mitsuo Horiuchi	Ind.	63,758	38.0	937	Kotaro Nagasaki	LDP	37.5	Ind. hold
Yamanashi 3rd	Takeshi Hosaka	Ind.	Takeshi Hosaka	Ind.	63,659	36.0	1,943	Hitoshi Goto	DPJ	34.9	Ind. hold

Proportional representation results
Party	Votes	Seats	Rank	Elected member	Constituency	Ratio
LDP	3,510,617 (42.4%)	10	2	Yoichiro Esaki		
LDP	3,510,617 (42.4%)	10	3	Jiro Ono	Yamanashi 3rd	80.6%
LDP	3,510,617 (42.4%)	10	4	Mikio Fujita	Chiba 4th	99.2%
LDP	3,510,617 (42.4%)	10	4	Kotaro Nagasaki	Yamanashi 2nd	98.5%
LDP	3,510,617 (42.4%)	10	4	Masaaki Akaike	Yamanashi 1st	93.0%
LDP	3,510,617 (42.4%)	10	4	Mineyuki Fukuda	Kanagawa 8th	84.4%
LDP	3,510,617 (42.4%)	10	33	Nobuhiro Omiya		
LDP	3,510,617 (42.4%)	10	34	Keisuke Suzuki		
LDP	3,510,617 (42.4%)	10	35	Taizō Sugimura		
LDP	3,510,617 (42.4%)	10	36	Toshio Ukishima		
DPJ	2,439,549 (29.5%)	7	1	Hiroyuki Nagahama		
DPJ	2,439,549 (29.5%)	7	2	Hitoshi Goto	Yamanashi 3rd	96.9%
DPJ	2,439,549 (29.5%)	7	2	Hirofumi Ryu	Kanagawa 9th	95.6%
DPJ	2,439,549 (29.5%)	7	2	Hisayasu Nagata	Chiba 2nd	90.8%
DPJ	2,439,549 (29.5%)	7	2	Tetsundo Iwakuni	Kanagawa 8th	89.5%
DPJ	2,439,549 (29.5%)	7	2	Akira Uchiyama	Chiba 7th	88.0%
DPJ	2,439,549 (29.5%)	7	2	Kaname Tajima	Chiba 1st	84.8%
Komei	1,007,504 (12.2%)	3	1	Shigeyuki Tomita		
Komei	1,007,504 (12.2%)	3	2	Noriko Furuya		
Komei	1,007,504 (12.2%)	3	3	Kazufumi Taniguchi		
JCP	566,945 (6.8%)	1	1	Kazuo Shii		
SDP	444,753 (5.4%)	1	1	Tomoko Abe	Kanagawa 12th	32.2%

== Tokyo block ==
2005 Japanese general election in Tokyo
- 11 September 2005

All 42 seats to the House of Representatives
	Majority party	Minority party	Third party
Party	LDP	DPJ	Komei
Last election	18 seats	20 seats	3 seats
Constituency	23	1	1
PR seats	7	6	2
Total	30	7	3
Seat change	▲12	▼13	0
	Fourth party	Fifth party
Party	JCP	SDP
Last election	1 seat	0 seats
Constituency	0	0
PR seats	1	1
Total	1	1
Seat change	0	▲1

Single-member constituency results in Tokyo
Constituency	Previous member		Elected member		Votes	%	Margin	Runner-up		%	Status
Tokyo 1st	Banri Kaieda	DPJ	Kaoru Yosano	LDP	149,894	54.6	48,498	Banri Kaieda	DPJ	36.9	LDP gain from DPJ
Tokyo 2nd	Yoshikatsu Nakayama	DPJ	Takashi Fukaya	LDP	127,889	50.9	29,554	Yoshikatsu Nakayama	DPJ	39.2	LDP gain from DPJ
Tokyo 3rd	Jin Matsubara	DPJ	Hirotaka Ishihara	LDP	151,989	50.7	27,990	Jin Matsubara	DPJ	41.4	LDP gain from DPJ
Tokyo 4th	Vacant	Ind.	Masaaki Taira	LDP	119,812	46.7	33,458	Noboru Usami	DPJ	33.7	LDP gain from Ind.
Tokyo 5th	Yoshio Tezuka	DPJ	Takashi Kosugi	LDP	150,667	53.4	41,049	Yoshio Tezuka	DPJ	38.8	LDP gain from DPJ
Tokyo 6th	Yoko Komiyama	DPJ	Takao Ochi	LDP	136,750	46.3	6,467	Yoko Komiyama	DPJ	44.1	LDP gain from DPJ
Tokyo 7th	Akira Nagatsuma	DPJ	Fumiaki Matsumoto	LDP	131,464	48.9	18,243	Akira Nagatsuma	DPJ	42.1	LDP gain from DPJ
Tokyo 8th	Nobuteru Ishihara	LDP	Nobuteru Ishihara	LDP	161,966	57.3	67,892	Morio Suzuki	DPJ	33.3	LDP hold
Tokyo 9th	Isshu Sugawara	LDP	Isshu Sugawara	LDP	153,309	53.9	65,419	Tomotaro Kawashima	DPJ	30.9	LDP hold
Tokyo 10th	Kōki Kobayashi	NPN	Yuriko Koike	LDP	109,764	50.0	58,229	Muneaki Samejima	DPJ	23.0	LDP gain from NPN
Tokyo 11th	Hakubun Shimomura	LDP	Hakubun Shimomura	LDP	148,099	55.0	62,267	Koichiro Watanabe	DPJ	31.9	LDP hold
Tokyo 12th	Akihiro Ota	Komei	Akihiro Ota	Komei	109,636	43.2	35,693	Yukihisa Fujita	DPJ	29.1	Komei hold
Tokyo 13th	Koriki Jojima	DPJ	Ichirō Kamoshita	LDP	129,586	53.8	49,208	Koriki Jojima	DPJ	33.4	LDP gain from DPJ
Tokyo 14th	Midori Matsushima	LDP	Midori Matsushima	LDP	118,771	55.4	49,663	Kazuo Inoue	DPJ	32.2	LDP hold
Tokyo 15th	Ben Kimura	LDP	Ben Kimura	LDP	123,021	54.4	43,400	Shozo Azuma	DPJ	35.2	LDP hold
Tokyo 16th	Yoshinobu Shimamura	LDP	Yoshinobu Shimamura	LDP	145,439	57.0	60,875	Hirosato Nakatsugawa	DPJ	33.1	LDP hold
Tokyo 17th	Katsuei Hirasawa	LDP	Katsuei Hirasawa	LDP	161,324	63.0	94,024	Atsushi Nishikori	DPJ	26.3	LDP hold
Tokyo 18th	Naoto Kan	DPJ	Naoto Kan	DPJ	126,716	47.4	7,837	Masatada Tsuchiya	LDP	44.5	DPJ hold
Tokyo 19th	Yoshinori Suematsu	DPJ	Yohei Matsumoto	LDP	138,596	46.3	5,416	Yoshinori Suematsu	DPJ	44.5	LDP gain from DPJ
Tokyo 20th	Koichi Kato	DPJ	Seiji Kihara	LDP	112,634	44.5	4,718	Koichi Kato	DPJ	42.7	LDP gain from DPJ
Tokyo 21st	Akihisa Nagashima	DPJ	Yuichi Ogawa	LDP	109,310	46.1	10,561	Akihisa Nagashima	DPJ	41.6	LDP gain from DPJ
Tokyo 22nd	Ikuo Yamahana	DPJ	Tatsuya Ito	LDP	150,404	52.1	42,987	Ikuo Yamahana	DPJ	37.2	LDP gain from DPJ
Tokyo 23rd	Kosuke Ito	LDP	Kosuke Ito	LDP	162,351	54.7	55,215	Eiko Ishige	DPJ	36.1	LDP hold
Tokyo 24th	Kōichi Hagiuda	LDP	Kōichi Hagiuda	LDP	150,552	53.2	44,093	Yukihiko Akutsu	DPJ	37.6	LDP hold
Tokyo 25th	Shinji Inoue	LDP	Shinji Inoue	LDP	113,800	57.0	47,792	Hisashi Shimada	DPJ	33.0	LDP hold

Proportional representation results
Party	Votes	Seats	Rank	Elected member	Constituency	Ratio
LDP	2,665,417 (40.2%)	8 → 7 (Note: Forfeited one seat due to lack of candidates.)	1	Kuniko Inoguchi		
LDP	2,665,417 (40.2%)	8 → 7	2	Masatada Tsuchiya	Tokyo 18th	93.8%
LDP	2,665,417 (40.2%)	8 → 7	26	Kazuo Aichi		
LDP	2,665,417 (40.2%)	8 → 7	27	Junichiro Yasui		
LDP	2,665,417 (40.2%)	8 → 7	28	Kenji Wakamiya		
LDP	2,665,417 (40.2%)	8 → 7	29	Taku Otsuka		
LDP	2,665,417 (40.2%)	8 → 7	30	Seiichiro Shimizu		
DPJ	1,962,225 (29.6%)	6	1	Yoshinori Suematsu	Tokyo 19th	96.0%
DPJ	1,962,225 (29.6%)	6	1	Koichi Kato	Tokyo 20th	95.8%
DPJ	1,962,225 (29.6%)	6	1	Yoko Komiyama	Tokyo 6th	95.2%
DPJ	1,962,225 (29.6%)	6	1	Akihisa Nagashima	Tokyo 21st	90.3%
DPJ	1,962,225 (29.6%)	6	1	Akira Nagatsuma	Tokyo 7th	86.1%
DPJ	1,962,225 (29.6%)	6	1	Jin Matsubara	Tokyo 3rd	81.5%
Komei	820,126 (12.4%)	2	1	Yōsuke Takagi		
Komei	820,126 (12.4%)	2	2	Michiyo Takagi		
JCP	586,017 (8.8%)	1	2	Akira Kasai		
SDP	300,782 (4.5%)	0 → 1	2	Nobuto Hosaka		

== Hokuriku-Shin'etsu block ==
2005 Japanese general election in Hokuriku-Shin'etsu
- 11 September 2005

All 31 seats to the House of Representatives
	Majority party	Minority party	Third party
Party	LDP	DPJ	PNP
Last election	18 seats	11 seats	New
Constituency	13	5	1
PR seats	5	4	1
Total	18	9	2
Seat change	0	▼2	▲2
	Fourth party	Fifth party
Party	Komei	Ind.
Last election	1 seat	1 seat
Constituency	0	1
PR seats	1	–
Total	1	1
Seat change	0	0

Single-member constituency results in Hokuriku-Shin'etsu
Constituency	Previous member		Elected member		Votes	%	Margin	Runner-up		%	Status
Niigata 1st	Chinami Nishimura	DPJ	Chinami Nishimura	DPJ	136,391	49.7	18,739	Rokuzaemon Yoshida	LDP	42.8	DPJ hold
Niigata 2nd	Motohiko Kondo	LDP	Motohiko Kondo	LDP	113,916	49.7	12,279	Eiichiro Washio	DPJ	44.3	LDP hold
Niigata 3rd	Yamato Inaba	LDP	Yamato Inaba	LDP	111,695	50.1	38,581	Masutsugu Miyazaki	SDP	32.8	LDP hold
Niigata 4th	Makiko Kikuta	DPJ	Makiko Kikuta	DPJ	114,843	50.5	20,872	Yoji Kurihara	LDP	41.3	DPJ hold
Niigata 5th	Makiko Tanaka	Ind.	Makiko Tanaka	Ind.	105,484	51.2	22,491	Ryuichi Yoneyama	LDP	40.3	Ind. hold
Niigata 6th	Nobutaka Tsutsui	DPJ	Nobutaka Tsutsui	DPJ	114,081	50.2	11,894	Shuichi Takatori	LDP	44.9	DPJ hold
Toyama 1st	Jinen Nagase	LDP	Jinen Nagase	LDP	88,840	52.3	17,768	Muneaki Murai	DPJ	41.8	LDP hold
Toyama 2nd	Mitsuhiro Miyakoshi	LDP	Mitsuhiro Miyakoshi	LDP	101,830	57.5	47,129	Masaei Nishio	DPJ	30.9	LDP hold
Toyama 3rd	Tamisuke Watanuki	PNP	Tamisuke Watanuki	PNP	120,083	41.3	19,497	Kyogon Hagiyama	LDP	34.6	PNP hold
Ishikawa 1st	Ken Okuda	DPJ	Hiroshi Hase	LDP	129,142	53.7	29,745	Ken Okuda	DPJ	41.4	LDP gain from DPJ
Ishikawa 2nd	Yoshirō Mori	LDP	Yoshirō Mori	LDP	129,785	57.6	45,880	Yasuo Ichikawa	DPJ	37.3	LDP hold
Ishikawa 3rd	Riki Kawara	LDP	Shigeo Kitamura	LDP	116,215	60.0	38,752	Yutaka Kuwabara	DPJ	40.0	LDP hold
Fukui 1st	Isao Matsumiya	Ind.	Tomomi Inada	LDP	51,242	33.4	373	Ryuzo Sasaki	DPJ	33.2	LDP gain from Ind.
Fukui 2nd	Taku Yamamoto	LDP	Taku Yamamoto	LDP	96,245	62.6	38,741	Seizō Wakaizumi	DPJ	37.4	LDP hold
Fukui 3rd	Tsuyoshi Takagi	LDP	Tsuyoshi Takagi	LDP	93,451	60.8	33,258	Kazuo Tamamura	DPJ	39.2	LDP hold
Nagano 1st	Kenji Kosaka	LDP	Kenji Kosaka	LDP	140,831	47.4	19,646	Takashi Shinohara	DPJ	40.8	LDP hold
Nagano 2nd	Mitsu Shimojo	DPJ	Mitsu Shimojo	DPJ	124,973	46.7	38,238	Riki Sekiya	LDP	32.4	DPJ hold
Nagano 3rd	Tsutomu Hata	DPJ	Tsutomu Hata	DPJ	143,728	47.5	40,839	Tadao Iwasaki	LDP	36.5	DPJ hold
Nagano 4th	Shigeyuki Goto	LDP	Shigeyuki Goto	LDP	87,859	49.7	21,356	Ikuo Horigome	DPJ	37.6	LDP hold
Nagano 5th	Ichiro Miyashita	LDP	Ichiro Miyashita	LDP	120,025	54.8	47,520	Takashi Kato	DPJ	33.1	LDP hold

Proportional representation results
Party	Votes	Seats	Rank	Elected member	Constituency	Ratio
LDP	1,665,553 (38.3%)	5	1	Tadayoshi Nagashima		
LDP	1,665,553 (38.3%)	5	3	Riki Kawara		
LDP	1,665,553 (38.3%)	5	4	Shuichi Takatori	Niigata 6th	89.5%
LDP	1,665,553 (38.3%)	5	4	Rokuzaemon Yoshida	Niigata 1st	86.2%
LDP	1,665,553 (38.3%)	5	4	Kyogon Hagiyama	Toyama 3rd	83.7%
DPJ	1,414,392 (32.5%)	4	1	Ryuzo Sasaki	Fukui 1st	99.2%
DPJ	1,414,392 (32.5%)	4	1	Eiichiro Washio	Niigata 2nd	89.2%
DPJ	1,414,392 (32.5%)	4	1	Takashi Shinohara	Nagano 1st	86.0%
DPJ	1,414,392 (32.5%)	4	1	Muneaki Murai	Toyama 1st	80.0%
Komei	403,203 (9.3%)	1	1	Yoshio Urushibara		
PNP	300,140 (6.9%)	1	1	Masaaki Itokawa		

== Tokai block ==
2005 Japanese general election in Tokai
- 11 September 2005

All 54 seats to the House of Representatives
	Majority party	Minority party	Third party
Party	LDP	DPJ	Komei
Last election	25 seats (Note: LDP and NCP)	24 seats	3 seats
Constituency	21	10	0
PR seats	9	8	3
Total	30	18	3
Seat change	▲5	▼6	0
	Fourth party	Fifth party
Party	JCP	Ind.
Last election	1 seat	1 seat
Constituency	0	2
PR seats	1	–
Total	1	2
Seat change	0	▲1

Single-member constituency results in Tokai
Constituency	Previous member		Elected member		Votes	%	Margin	Runner-up		%	Status
Gifu 1st	Seiko Noda	Ind.	Seiko Noda	Ind.	96,985	42.8	15,796	Yukari Sato	LDP	35.8	Ind. hold
Gifu 2nd	Yasufumi Tanahashi	LDP	Yasufumi Tanahashi	LDP	130,953	61.8	64,130	Rina Ooishi	DPJ	31.5	LDP hold
Gifu 3rd	Kabun Mutō	LDP	Yoji Muto	LDP	137,562	49.3	16,964	Yasuhiro Sonoda	DPJ	43.2	LDP hold
Gifu 4th	Takao Fujii	Ind.	Kazuyoshi Kaneko	LDP	126,921	46.3	28,502	Takao Fujii	Ind.	35.9	LDP gain from Ind.
Gifu 5th	Keiji Furuya	Ind.	Keiji Furuya	Ind.	88,874	42.0	33,442	Takaaki Wani	LDP	26.2	Ind. hold
Shizuoka 1st	Seishu Makino	DPJ	Yōko Kamikawa	LDP	99,702	39.5	30,591	Nobuhiro Tanabe	Ind.	27.4	LDP gain from DPJ
Shizuoka 2nd	Yoshitsugu Harada	LDP	Yoshitsugu Harada	LDP	155,019	56.7	36,455	Shogo Tsugawa	DPJ	43.3	LDP hold
Shizuoka 3rd	Hakuo Yanagisawa	LDP	Hakuo Yanagisawa	LDP	153,500	61.3	74,425	Koji Hirashima	DPJ	31.6	LDP hold
Shizuoka 4th	Yoshio Mochizuki	LDP	Yoshio Mochizuki	LDP	116,045	54.4	18,715	Kenji Tamura	DPJ	45.6	LDP hold
Shizuoka 5th	Goshi Hosono	DPJ	Goshi Hosono	DPJ	148,002	48.8	6,615	Toshitsugu Saito	LDP	46.6	DPJ hold
Shizuoka 6th	Shu Watanabe	DPJ	Shu Watanabe	DPJ	154,542	52.6	33,453	Masatoshi Kurata	LDP	41.2	DPJ hold
Shizuoka 7th	Minoru Kiuchi	Ind.	Satsuki Katayama	LDP	85,168	36.8	748	Minoru Kiuchi	Ind.	36.4	LDP gain from Ind.
Shizuoka 8th	Ryū Shionoya	LDP	Ryū Shionoya	LDP	128,456	53.1	26,655	Yasutomo Suzuki	DPJ	42.1	LDP hold
Aichi 1st	Takashi Kawamura	DPJ	Takashi Kawamura	DPJ	105,449	50.0	22,963	Yōsuke Shinoda	LDP	39.1	DPJ hold
Aichi 2nd	Motohisa Furukawa	DPJ	Motohisa Furukawa	DPJ	116,884	52.0	29,080	Yuji Okada	LDP	39.1	DPJ hold
Aichi 3rd	Shoichi Kondo	DPJ	Shoichi Kondo	DPJ	110,799	49.0	24,373	Tatsuharu Mawatari	LDP	38.2	DPJ hold
Aichi 4th	Yoshio Maki	DPJ	Yoshio Maki	DPJ	95,844	43.7	8,020	Makiko Fujino	LDP	40.1	DPJ hold
Aichi 5th	Hirotaka Akamatsu	DPJ	Takahide Kimura	LDP	117,017	48.3	9,372	Hirotaka Akamatsu	DPJ	44.4	LDP gain from DPJ
Aichi 6th	Yukichi Maeda	DPJ	Hideki Niwa	LDP	126,670	48.0	13,203	Yukichi Maeda	DPJ	43.0	LDP gain from DPJ
Aichi 7th	Kenji Kobayashi	DPJ	Junji Suzuki	LDP	134,535	50.0	22,881	Kenji Kobayashi	DPJ	41.5	LDP gain from DPJ
Aichi 8th	Yutaka Banno	DPJ	Tadahiko Ito	LDP	123,280	45.9	8,080	Yutaka Banno	DPJ	42.9	LDP gain from DPJ
Aichi 9th	Toshiki Kaifu	LDP	Toshiki Kaifu	LDP	130,771	47.7	19,962	Mitsunori Okamoto	DPJ	40.4	LDP hold
Aichi 10th	Tetsuma Esaki	LDP	Tetsuma Esaki	LDP	140,622	52.7	35,795	Kazumi Sugimoto	DPJ	39.3	LDP hold
Aichi 11th	Shinichiro Furumoto	DPJ	Shinichiro Furumoto	DPJ	132,730	52.3	27,099	Masaki Doi	LDP	41.6	DPJ hold
Aichi 12th	Seiken Sugiura	LDP	Seiken Sugiura	LDP	159,256	52.6	30,575	Yasuhiro Nakane	DPJ	42.5	LDP hold
Aichi 13th	Hideaki Ōmura	LDP	Hideaki Ōmura	LDP	139,022	53.1	29,429	Satoshi Shima	DPJ	41.8	LDP hold
Aichi 14th	Katsumasa Suzuki	DPJ	Katsumasa Suzuki	DPJ	97,382	52.2	18,821	Motoshi Sugita	LDP	42.1	DPJ hold
Aichi 15th	Akihiko Yamamoto	LDP	Akihiko Yamamoto	LDP	122,904	56.4	47,972	Kazuyoshi Morimoto	DPJ	34.4	LDP hold
Mie 1st	Jirō Kawasaki	LDP	Jirō Kawasaki	LDP	112,023	50.5	16,463	Hiroshi Nakai	DPJ	43.1	LDP hold
Mie 2nd	Masaharu Nakagawa	DPJ	Masaharu Nakagawa	DPJ	117,134	55.7	35,932	Masato Kobayashi	LDP	38.6	DPJ hold
Mie 3rd	Katsuya Okada	DPJ	Katsuya Okada	DPJ	140,954	60.1	59,235	Koichi Hirata	LDP	34.8	DPJ hold
Mie 4th	Norihisa Tamura	LDP	Norihisa Tamura	LDP	91,832	53.8	13,011	Tetsuo Morimoto	DPJ	46.2	LDP hold
Mie 5th	Norio Mitsuya	LDP	Norio Mitsuya	LDP	117,768	55.9	34,031	Yoichi Kaneko	DPJ	39.8	LDP hold

Proportional representation results
Party	Votes	Seats	Rank	Elected member	Constituency	Ratio
LDP	3,066,048 (38.6%)	9	1	Makiko Fujino	Aichi 4th	91.6%
LDP	3,066,048 (38.6%)	9	1	Yukari Sato	Gifu 1st	83.7%
LDP	3,066,048 (38.6%)	9	4	Koichi Hirata	Mie 3rd	57.9%
LDP	3,066,048 (38.6%)	9	5	Masatoshi Kurata	Shizuoka 6th	78.3%
LDP	3,066,048 (38.6%)	9	6	Toshitsugu Saito	Shizuoka 5th	95.5%
LDP	3,066,048 (38.6%)	9	6	Motoshi Sugita	Aichi 14th	80.6%
LDP	3,066,048 (38.6%)	9	6	Masaki Doi	Aichi 11th	79.5%
LDP	3,066,048 (38.6%)	9	6	Yōsuke Shinoda	Aichi 1st	78.2%
LDP	3,066,048 (38.6%)	9	6	Tatsuharu Mawatari	Aichi 3rd	78.0%
DPJ	2,766,443 (34.8%)	8	1	Yutaka Banno	Aichi 8th	93.4%
DPJ	2,766,443 (34.8%)	8	1	Hirotaka Akamatsu	Aichi 5th	91.9%
DPJ	2,766,443 (34.8%)	8	1	Yukichi Maeda	Aichi 6th	89.5%
DPJ	2,766,443 (34.8%)	8	1	Yasuhiro Sonoda	Gifu 3rd	87.6%
DPJ	2,766,443 (34.8%)	8	1	Tetsuo Morimoto	Mie 4th	85.8%
DPJ	2,766,443 (34.8%)	8	1	Hiroshi Nakai	Mie 1st	85.3%
DPJ	2,766,443 (34.8%)	8	1	Mitsunori Okamoto	Aichi 9th	84.7%
DPJ	2,766,443 (34.8%)	8	1	Kenji Tamura	Shizuoka 4th	83.8%
Komei	987,290 (12.4%)	3	1	Chikara Sakaguchi		
Komei	987,290 (12.4%)	3	2	Yoshinori Oguchi		
Komei	987,290 (12.4%)	3	3	Wataru Ito		
JCP	502,501 (6.3%)	1	1	Kensho Sasaki		

== Kinki block ==
2005 Japanese general election in Kinki
- 11 September 2005

All 77 seats to the House of Representatives
	Majority party	Minority party	Third party
Party	LDP	DPJ	Komei
Last election	30 seats	31 seats	11 seats
Constituency	34	8	4
PR seats	11	9	6
Total	45	17	10
Seat change	▲15	▼14	▼1
	Fourth party	Fifth party	Sixth party
Party	JCP	SDP	NPN
Last election	3 seats	1 seat	New
Constituency	0	0	0
PR seats	3	1	1
Total	3	1	1
Seat change	0	0	▲1

Single-member constituency results in Kinki
Constituency	Previous member		Elected member		Votes	%	Margin	Runner-up		%	Status
Shiga 1st	Tatsuo Kawabata	DPJ	Kenichiro Ueno	LDP	94,671	46.1	5,168	Tatsuo Kawabata	DPJ	43.6	LDP gain from DPJ
Shiga 2nd	Issei Tajima	DPJ	Issei Tajima	DPJ	67,481	38.5	13,414	Yuji Fujii	LDP	30.8	DPJ hold
Shiga 3rd	Taizō Mikazuki	DPJ	Taizō Mikazuki	DPJ	74,272	46.8	266	Osamu Uno	LDP	46.7	DPJ hold
Shiga 4th	Mineichi Iwanaga	LDP	Mineichi Iwanaga	LDP	98,748	50.2	18,532	Tenzo Okumura	DPJ	30.8	LDP hold
Kyoto 1st	Bunmei Ibuki	LDP	Bunmei Ibuki	LDP	112,848	47.7	44,285	Kazuya Tamaki	DPJ	29.0	LDP hold
Kyoto 2nd	Seiji Maehara	DPJ	Seiji Maehara	DPJ	73,795	42.8	4,465	Tomohiro Yamamoto	LDP	40.2	DPJ hold
Kyoto 3rd	Kenta Izumi	DPJ	Kenta Izumi	DPJ	92,249	42.7	820	Koichiro Shimizu	LDP	42.3	DPJ hold
Kyoto 4th	Hideo Tanaka	Ind.	Yasuhiro Nakagawa	LDP	75,192	29.0	156	Hideo Tanaka	Ind.	28.9	LDP gain from Ind.
Kyoto 5th	Sadakazu Tanigaki	LDP	Sadakazu Tanigaki	LDP	107,792	58.9	57,897	Tetsuya Kobayashi	DPJ	27.2	LDP hold
Kyoto 6th	Kazunori Yamanoi	DPJ	Kazunori Yamanoi	DPJ	133,708	45.5	10,739	Kyoko Izawa	LDP	41.8	DPJ hold
Osaka 1st	Kōki Chūma	LDP	Kōki Chūma	LDP	116,956	54.5	44,444	Atsushi Kumada	DPJ	33.8	LDP hold
Osaka 2nd	Megumu Sato	Ind.	Shika Kawajo	LDP	73,953	32.8	2,530	Megumu Sato	Ind.	31.7	LDP gain from Ind.
Osaka 3rd	Masahiro Tabata	Komei	Masahiro Tabata	Komei	119,226	49.4	34,049	Megumu Tsuji	DPJ	35.3	Komei hold
Osaka 4th	Osamu Yoshida	DPJ	Yasuhide Nakayama	LDP	132,072	52.3	40,316	Osamu Yoshida	DPJ	36.3	LDP gain from DPJ
Osaka 5th	Takayoshi Taniguchi	Komei	Takayoshi Taniguchi	Komei	118,574	47.7	31,572	Tetsuo Inami	DPJ	35.0	Komei hold
Osaka 6th	Yutaka Fukushima	Komei	Yutaka Fukushima	Komei	127,157	52.7	42,595	Fumiyoshi Murakami	DPJ	35.0	Komei hold
Osaka 7th	Osamu Fujimura	DPJ	Naomi Tokashiki	LDP	98,151	43.4	13,778	Osamu Fujimura	DPJ	37.3	LDP gain from DPJ
Osaka 8th	Kansei Nakano	DPJ	Takashi Ōtsuka	LDP	103,120	49.6	20,,830	Kansei Nakano	DPJ	39.6	LDP gain from DPJ
Osaka 9th	Nobumori Otani	DPJ	Takeshi Nishida	LDP	142,243	50.5	30,434	Nobumori Otani	DPJ	39.7	LDP gain from DPJ
Osaka 10th	Miyoko Hida	DPJ	Kenta Matsunami	LDP	83,607	38.4	14,993	Kiyomi Tsujimoto	SDP	31.5	LDP gain from DPJ
Osaka 11th	Hirofumi Hirano	DPJ	Hirofumi Hirano	DPJ	121,328	48.1	22,715	Nobuko Iwaki	LDP	39.1	DPJ hold
Osaka 12th	Shinji Tarutoko	DPJ	Tomokatsu Kitagawa	LDP	108,903	49.6	21,812	Shinji Tarutoko	DPJ	39.7	LDP gain from DPJ
Osaka 13th	Akira Nishino	LDP	Akira Nishino	LDP	141,141	58.1	80,350	Takashi Fuke	DPJ	25.0	LDP hold
Osaka 14th	Takashi Tanihata	LDP	Takashi Tanihata	LDP	151,853	54.9	62,711	Takashi Nagao	DPJ	32.2	LDP hold
Osaka 15th	Naokazu Takemoto	LDP	Naokazu Takemoto	LDP	144,663	55.8	61,819	Yuki Sakai	DPJ	31.9	LDP hold
Osaka 16th	Kazuo Kitagawa	Komei	Kazuo Kitagawa	Komei	99,919	51.5	29,871	Yoshikazu Tarui	DPJ	36.1	Komei hold
Osaka 17th	Shingo Nishimura	DPJ	Nobuko Okashita	LDP	90,765	43.3	1,489	Shingo Nishimura	DPJ	42.6	LDP gain from DPJ
Osaka 18th	Taro Nakayama	LDP	Taro Nakayama	LDP	139,616	52.9	46,214	Osamu Nakagawa	DPJ	35.4	LDP hold
Osaka 19th	Takashi Nagayasu	DPJ	Takashi Nagayasu	DPJ	91,918	48.3	9,481	Kenshiro Matsunami	LDP	43.3	DPJ hold
Hyogo 1st	Keisuke Sunada	Ind.	Masahito Moriyama	LDP	95,746	43.0	30,360	Hajime Ishii	DPJ	29.3	LDP gain from Ind.
Hyogo 2nd	Kazuyoshi Akaba	Komei	Kazuyoshi Akaba	Komei	106,056	48.1	22,676	Fusaho Izumi	DPJ	37.8	Komei hold
Hyogo 3rd	Ryuichi Doi	DPJ	Yoshihiro Seki	LDP	92,556	45.3	5,374	Ryuichi Doi	DPJ	42.7	LDP gain from DPJ
Hyogo 4th	Kiichi Inoue	LDP	Kiichi Inoue	LDP	150,580	56.0	53,506	Shoichi Takahashi	DPJ	36.1	LDP hold
Hyogo 5th	Yoichi Tani	LDP	Yoichi Tani	LDP	118,063	45.3	30,086	Yasuhiro Kajiwara	DPJ	33.8	LDP hold
Hyogo 6th	Koichiro Ichimura	DPJ	Tsukasa Kobiki	LDP	112,265	36.4	10,210	Koichiro Ichimura	DPJ	33.1	LDP gain from DPJ
Hyogo 7th	Shigeo Omae	LDP	Shigeo Omae	LDP	145,851	50.2	49,848	Toshiro Ishii	DPJ	33.1	LDP hold
Hyogo 8th	Tetsuzo Fuyushiba	Komei	Tetsuzo Fuyushiba	Komei	109,957	46.3	26,669	Kunihiko Muroi	DPJ	35.1	Komei hold
Hyogo 9th	Yasutoshi Nishimura	LDP	Yasutoshi Nishimura	LDP	136,605	58.3	74,988	Mitsunari Hatanaka	DPJ	26.3	LDP hold
Hyogo 10th	Kisaburo Tokai	LDP	Kisaburo Tokai	LDP	112,870	51.4	22,230	Yasuhiro Okada	DPJ	41.2	LDP hold
Hyogo 11th	Takeaki Matsumoto	DPJ	Tōru Toida	LDP	113,401	47.5	2,435	Takeaki Matsumoto	DPJ	46.5	LDP gain from DPJ
Hyogo 12th	Saburo Komoto	LDP	Saburo Komoto	LDP	115,731	50.1	9,165	Tsuyoshi Yamaguchi	DPJ	46.2	LDP hold
Nara 1st	Sumio Mabuchi	DPJ	Sumio Mabuchi	DPJ	73,062	37.2	6,847	Chubee Kagita	LDP	33.7	DPJ hold
Nara 2nd	Tetsuji Nakamura	DPJ	Sanae Takaichi	LDP	92,096	44.5	20,022	Tetsuji Nakamura	DPJ	34.8	LDP gain from DPJ
Nara 3rd	Shinsuke Okuno	LDP	Shinsuke Okuno	LDP	104,572	52.9	29,538	Masashige Yoshikawa	DPJ	38.0	LDP hold
Nara 4th	Ryotaro Tanose	LDP	Ryotaro Tanose	LDP	107,014	55.5	30,983	Yutaka Morishita	DPJ	39.5	LDP hold
Wakayama 1st	Tatsuya Tanimoto	LDP	Tatsuya Tanimoto	LDP	100,868	51.0	22,247	Shūhei Kishimoto	DPJ	39.7	LDP hold
Wakayama 2nd	Masatoshi Ishida	LDP	Masatoshi Ishida	LDP	88,915	54.1	26,416	Takeshi Kishimoto	DPJ	38.0	LDP hold
Wakayama 3rd	Toshihiro Nikai	LDP	Toshihiro Nikai	LDP	145,735	66.4	92,203	Terushige Manabe	DPJ	24.4	LDP hold

Proportional representation results
Party	Votes	Seats	Rank	Elected member	Constituency	Ratio
LDP	4,003,209 (36.8%)	11	1	Mitsue Kondo		
LDP	4,003,209 (36.8%)	11	2	Nobuko Iwaki	Osaka 11th	81.2%
LDP	4,003,209 (36.8%)	11	4	Takuji Yanagimoto		
LDP	4,003,209 (36.8%)	11	6	Osamu Uno	Shiga 3rd	99.6%
LDP	4,003,209 (36.8%)	11	6	Koichiro Shimizu	Kyoto 3rd	99.1%
LDP	4,003,209 (36.8%)	11	6	Tomohiro Yamamoto	Kyoto 2nd	93.9%
LDP	4,003,209 (36.8%)	11	6	Kyoko Izawa	Kyoto 6th	91.9%
LDP	4,003,209 (36.8%)	11	6	Chubee Kagita	Nara 1st	90.6%
LDP	4,003,209 (36.8%)	11	6	Kenshiro Matsunami	Osaka 19th	89.6%
LDP	4,003,209 (36.8%)	11	6	Yuji Fujii	Shiga 2nd	80.1%
LDP	4,003,209 (36.8%)	11	43	Takashi Yano		
DPJ	3,157,556 (29.0%)	9	1	Shingo Nishimura	Osaka 17th	98.3%
DPJ	3,157,556 (29.0%)	9	1	Takeaki Matsumoto	Hyogo 11th	97.8%
DPJ	3,157,556 (29.0%)	9	1	Keiro Kitagami	Kyoto 4th	97.8%
DPJ	3,157,556 (29.0%)	9	1	Tatsuo Kawabata	Shiga 1st	94.5%
DPJ	3,157,556 (29.0%)	9	1	Ryuichi Doi	Hyogo 3rd	94.1%
DPJ	3,157,556 (29.0%)	9	1	Tsuyoshi Yamaguchi	Hyogo 12th	92.0%
DPJ	3,157,556 (29.0%)	9	1	Koichiro Ichimura	Hyogo 6th	90.9%
DPJ	3,157,556 (29.0%)	9	1	Osamu Fujimura	Osaka 7th	85.9%
DPJ	3,157,556 (29.0%)	9	1	Tenzo Okumura	Shiga 4th	81.2%
Komei	1,626,678 (15.0%)	4	1	Yasuko Ikenobō		
Komei	1,626,678 (15.0%)	4	2	Masao Akamatsu		
Komei	1,626,678 (15.0%)	4	3	Shigeki Sato		
Komei	1,626,678 (15.0%)	4	4	Hiroyoshi Nishi		
JCP	1,051,949 (9.7%)	3	1	Ikuko Ishii		
JCP	1,051,949 (9.7%)	3	2	Keiji Kokuta	Kyoto 1st	48.8%
JCP	1,051,949 (9.7%)	3	3	Hidekatsu Yoshii	Osaka 13th	29.0%
SDP	619,883 (5.7%)	1	1	Kiyomi Tsujimoto	Osaka 10th	82.0%
NPN	420,908 (3.9%)	1	1	Makoto Taki	Nara 2nd	32.5%

== Chugoku block ==
2005 Japanese general election in Chugoku
- 11 September 2005

All 31 seats to the House of Representatives
	Majority party	Minority party	Third party
Party	LDP	DPJ	Komei
Last election	22 seats	6 seats	2 seats
Constituency	16	2	0
PR seats	5	3	2
Total	21	5	2
Seat change	▼1	▼1	0
	Fourth party	Fifth party
Party	PNP	Ind.
Last election	New	1 seat
Constituency	1	1
PR seats	1	–
Total	2	1
Seat change	▲2	0

Single-member constituency results in Chugoku
Constituency	Previous member		Elected member		Votes	%	Margin	Runner-up		%	Status
Tottori 1st	Shigeru Ishiba	LDP	Shigeru Ishiba	LDP	106,805	59.2	58,713	Shusaku Hayakawa	DPJ	26.7	LDP hold
Tottori 2nd	Yoshihiro Kawakami	Ind.	Ryosei Akazawa	LDP	64,132	37.4	5,223	Yoshihiro Kawakami	Ind.	34.4	LDP gain from Ind.
Shimane 1st	Hiroyuki Hosoda	LDP	Hiroyuki Hosoda	LDP	125,401	60.5	66,067	Kazuhisa Hamaguchi	DPJ	28.6	LDP hold
Shimane 2nd	Wataru Takeshita	LDP	Wataru Takeshita	LDP	127,118	51.9	55,020	Hisaoki Kamei	PNP	29.4	LDP hold
Okayama 1st	Ichiro Aisawa	LDP	Ichiro Aisawa	LDP	127,294	60.8	65,937	Gentaro Kan	DPJ	29.3	LDP hold
Okayama 2nd	Akihiko Kumashiro	Ind.	Keisuke Tsumura	DPJ	88,277	46.9	2,242	Seiji Hagiwara	LDP	45.7	DPJ gain from Ind.
Okayama 3rd	Takeo Hiranuma	Ind.	Takeo Hiranuma	Ind.	99,931	49.0	40,628	Toshiko Abe	LDP	29.1	Ind. hold
Okayama 4th	Ryutaro Hashimoto	LDP	Michiyoshi Yunoki	DPJ	102,370	47.4	6,014	Gaku Hashimoto	LDP	44.6	DPJ gain from LDP
Okayama 5th	Yoshitaka Murata	LDP	Yoshitaka Murata	LDP	114,981	59.6	47,412	Hiroki Hanasaki	DPJ	35.0	LDP hold
Hiroshima 1st	Fumio Kishida	LDP	Fumio Kishida	LDP	107,239	57.3	48,293	Hiroshi Sugekawa	DPJ	31.5	LDP hold
Hiroshima 2nd	Daisuke Matsumoto	DPJ	Hiroshi Hiraguchi	LDP	129,462	50.8	17,027	Daisuke Matsumoto	DPJ	44.1	LDP gain from DPJ
Hiroshima 3rd	Yoshitake Masuhara	LDP	Katsuyuki Kawai	LDP	94,017	42.1	34,441	Hiroaki Hashimoto	DPJ	26.7	LDP hold
Hiroshima 4th	Hidenao Nakagawa	LDP	Hidenao Nakagawa	LDP	110,046	58.5	42,125	Seiki Soramoto	DPJ	36.1	LDP hold
Hiroshima 5th	Minoru Terada	LDP	Minoru Terada	LDP	97,383	49.6	6,262	Mitsuo Mitani	DPJ	46.4	LDP hold
Hiroshima 6th	Shizuka Kamei	PNP	Shizuka Kamei	PNP	110,979	41.5	26,546	Takafumi Horie	Ind.	31.6	PNP hold
Hiroshima 7th	Yoichi Miyazawa	LDP	Yoichi Miyazawa	LDP	122,465	50.8	18,456	Takashi Wada	DPJ	43.2	LDP hold
Yamaguchi 1st	Masahiko Kōmura	LDP	Masahiko Kōmura	LDP	148,912	63.8	84,603	Yoshiyuki Kitazumi	DPJ	27.6	LDP hold
Yamaguchi 2nd	Hideo Hiraoka	DPJ	Yoshihiko Fukuda	LDP	104,322	47.1	588	Hideo Hiraoka	DPJ	46.8	LDP gain from DPJ
Yamaguchi 3rd	Takeo Kawamura	LDP	Takeo Kawamura	LDP	118,412	62.2	62,597	Noboru Miura	DPJ	29.3	LDP hold
Yamaguchi 4th	Shinzo Abe	LDP	Shinzo Abe	LDP	137,701	73.6	100,854	Takashi Kato	DPJ	19.7	LDP hold

Proportional representation results
Party	Votes	Seats	Rank	Elected member	Constituency	Ratio
LDP	1,537,080 (36.7%)	5	1	Toshiko Abe	Okayama 3rd	59.3%
LDP	1,537,080 (36.7%)	5	2	Katsunobu Katō		
LDP	1,537,080 (36.7%)	5	3	Yoshitake Masuhara		
LDP	1,537,080 (36.7%)	5	4	Seiji Hagiwara	Okayama 2nd	97.4%
LDP	1,537,080 (36.7%)	5	4	Gaku Hashimoto	Okayama 4th	94.1%
DPJ	1,196,971 (28.6%)	3	1	Hideo Hiraoka	Yamaguchi 2nd	99.4%
DPJ	1,196,971 (28.6%)	3	1	Mitsuo Mitani	Hiroshima 5th	93.5%
DPJ	1,196,971 (28.6%)	3	1	Daisuke Matsumoto	Hiroshima 2nd	99.2%
Komei	658,702 (15.7%)	2	1	Tetsuo Saito		
Komei	658,702 (15.7%)	2	2	Keigo Masuya		
PNP	330,546 (7.9%)	1	1	Hisaoki Kamei	Shimane 2nd	56.7%

== Shikoku block ==
2005 Japanese general election in Shikoku
- 11 September 2005

All 19 seats to the House of Representatives
	Majority party	Minority party
Party	LDP	DPJ
Last election	15 seats	3 seats
Constituency	11	1
PR seats	3	2
Total	14	3
Seat change	▼1	0
	Third party	Fourth party
Party	Komei	Ind.
Last election	1 seat	0 seats
Constituency	0	1
PR seats	1	–
Total	1	1
Seat change	0	▲1

Single-member constituency results in Shikoku
Constituency	Previous member		Elected member		Votes	%	Margin	Runner-up		%	Status
Tokushima 1st	Yoshito Sengoku	DPJ	Yoshito Sengoku	DPJ	68,026	51.3	13,183	Yoshiro Okamoto	LDP	41.3	DPJ hold
Tokushima 2nd	Shunichi Yamaguchi	Ind.	Shunichi Yamaguchi	Ind.	62,582	39.5	15,383	Miho Takai	DPJ	29.8	Ind. hold
Tokushima 3rd	Masazumi Gotoda	LDP	Masazumi Gotoda	LDP	88,581	57.3	28,518	Hirobumi Niki	DPJ	38.8	LDP hold
Kagawa 1st	Takuya Hirai	LDP	Takuya Hirai	LDP	103,592	50.9	12,131	Junya Ogawa	DPJ	44.9	LDP hold
Kagawa 2nd	Yoshio Kimura	LDP	Yoshio Kimura	LDP	100,794	55.9	30,617	Yuichiro Tamaki	DPJ	38.9	LDP hold
Kagawa 3rd	Yoshinori Ohno	LDP	Yoshinori Ohno	LDP	107,726	66.9	68,549	Kenji Okuda	SDP	24.3	LDP hold
Ehime 1st	Yasuhisa Shiozaki	LDP	Yasuhisa Shiozaki	LDP	138,068	60.4	78,083	Akira Tamai	DPJ	26.3	LDP hold
Ehime 2nd	Seiichiro Murakami	LDP	Seiichiro Murakami	LDP	115,297	59.2	50,423	Masamitsu Saito	DPJ	33.3	LDP hold
Ehime 3rd	Shinya Ono	LDP	Shinya Ono	LDP	92,245	54.5	31,308	Tsuyoshi Takahashi	DPJ	36.0	LDP hold
Ehime 4th	Koichi Yamamoto	LDP	Koichi Yamamoto	LDP	115,501	63.1	62,677	Kinya Hamaguchi	DPJ	28.9	LDP hold
Kochi 1st	Teru Fukui	LDP	Teru Fukui	LDP	53,754	42.7	4,050	Masanori Goto	DPJ	39.5	LDP hold
Kochi 2nd	Gen Nakatani	LDP	Gen Nakatani	LDP	70,010	51.1	25,120	Kumiko Tamura	DPJ	32.8	LDP hold
Kochi 3rd	Yūji Yamamoto	LDP	Yūji Yamamoto	LDP	74,072	50.1	20,354	Tomoi Nakayama	DPJ	36.3	LDP hold

Proportional representation results
Party	Votes	Seats	Rank	Elected member	Constituency	Ratio
LDP	821,746 (38.3%)	3	1	Akira Shichijo	Tokushima 2nd	69.8%
LDP	821,746 (38.3%)	3	2	Yoshiro Okamoto	Tokushima 1st	80.6%
LDP	821,746 (38.3%)	3	14	Katsuko Nishimoto		
DPJ	711,927 (33.2%)	2	1	Masanori Goto	Kochi 1st	92.4%
DPJ	711,927 (33.2%)	2	1	Junya Ogawa	Kagawa 1st	88.2%
Komei	317,575 (14.8%)	1	1	Noritoshi Ishida		

== Kyushu block ==
2005 Japanese general election in Kyushu
- 11 September 2005

All 59 seats to the House of Representatives
	Majority party	Minority party	Third party
Party	LDP	DPJ	Komei
Last election	30 seats	15 seats	4 seats
Constituency	25	4	0
PR seats	9	7	3
Total	34	11	3
Seat change	▲4	▼4	▼1
	Fourth party	Fifth party	Sixth party
Party	SDP	JCP	Ind.
Last election	3 seats	1 seat	5 seats
Constituency	1	0	8
PR seats	1	1	–
Total	2	1	8
Seat change	▼1	0	▲3

Single-member constituency results in Kyushu
Constituency	Previous member		Elected member		Votes	%	Margin	Runner-up		%	Status
Fukuoka 1st	Ryu Matsumoto	DPJ	Ryu Matsumoto	DPJ	99,939	47.3	7,048	Nobuhiko Endō	LDP	43.9	DPJ hold
Fukuoka 2nd	Taku Yamasaki	LDP	Taku Yamasaki	LDP	136,702	52.4	39,739	Masanori Hirata	DPJ	37.1	LDP hold
Fukuoka 3rd	Kazue Fujita	DPJ	Seiichi Ota	LDP	139,428	54.1	34,694	Kazue Fujita	DPJ	40.6	LDP gain from DPJ
Fukuoka 4th	Tomoyoshi Watanabe	LDP	Tomoyoshi Watanabe	LDP	114,613	53.1	28,955	Kinya Narazaki	DPJ	39.7	LDP hold
Fukuoka 5th	Yoshiaki Harada	LDP	Yoshiaki Harada	LDP	139,178	53.3	34,628	Daizo Kusuda	DPJ	40.0	LDP hold
Fukuoka 6th	Issei Koga	DPJ	Kunio Hatoyama	LDP	131,946	52.1	22,120	Issei Koga	DPJ	43.3	LDP gain from DPJ
Fukuoka 7th	Makoto Koga	LDP	Makoto Koga	LDP	112,420	54.1	36,896	Daisuke Nakaya	DPJ	36.3	LDP hold
Fukuoka 8th	Tarō Asō	LDP	Tarō Asō	LDP	145,229	56.9	57,373	Kusuo Oshima	DPJ	34.4	LDP hold
Fukuoka 9th	Kenji Kitahashi	DPJ	Asahiko Mihara	LDP	121,465	47.6	14,727	Kenji Kitahashi	DPJ	41.9	LDP gain from DPJ
Fukuoka 10th	Shozaburo Jimi	Ind.	Kyoko Nishikawa	LDP	97,748	38.4	32,619	Shozaburo Jimi	Ind.	25.6	LDP gain from Ind.
Fukuoka 11th	Ryota Takeda	Ind.	Ryota Takeda	Ind.	78,757	39.5	449	Kozo Yamamoto	LDP	39.3	Ind. hold
Saga 1st	Kazuhiro Haraguchi	DPJ	Takamaro Fukuoka	LDP	84,643	50.3	9,194	Kazuhiro Haraguchi	DPJ	44.9	LDP gain from DPJ
Saga 2nd	Masahiro Imamura	Ind.	Masahiro Imamura	Ind.	66,995	42.1	15,696	Hiroshi Ogushi	DPJ	32.2	Ind. hold
Saga 3rd	Kosuke Hori	Ind.	Kosuke Hori	Ind.	87,485	54.0	38,493	Motoko Hirotsu	LDP	30.3	Ind. hold
Nagasaki 1st	Yoshiaki Takaki	DPJ	Yoshiaki Takaki	DPJ	110,518	48.3	8,537	Tsutomu Tomioka	LDP	44.6	DPJ hold
Nagasaki 2nd	Fumio Kyūma	LDP	Fumio Kyūma	LDP	123,234	54.8	34,762	Yukishige Okubo	DPJ	39.4	LDP hold
Nagasaki 3rd	Yaichi Tanigawa	LDP	Yaichi Tanigawa	LDP	83,992	53.0	9,608	Masahiko Yamada	DPJ	47.0	LDP hold
Nagasaki 4th	Seigo Kitamura	LDP	Seigo Kitamura	LDP	97,174	50.7	30,086	Daisuke Miyajima	DPJ	35.0	LDP hold
Kumamoto 1st	Yorihisa Matsuno	DPJ	Yorihisa Matsuno	DPJ	112,500	47.9	2,428	Minoru Kihara	LDP	46.9	DPJ hold
Kumamoto 2nd	Takeshi Hayashida	LDP	Takeshi Noda	LDP	112,549	55.8	32,756	Nobuo Matsuno	DPJ	39.5	LDP hold
Kumamoto 3rd	Tetsushi Sakamoto	Ind.	Toshikatsu Matsuoka	LDP	86,688	43.7	7,892	Tetsushi Sakamoto	Ind.	39.7	LDP gain from Ind.
Kumamoto 4th	Hiroyuki Sonoda	LDP	Hiroyuki Sonoda	LDP	136,380	68.3	73,211	Motosuke Matsumoto	DPJ	31.7	LDP hold
Kumamoto 5th	Yasushi Kaneko	LDP	Yasushi Kaneko	LDP	105,690	61.6	39,776	Hidetomo Goto	DPJ	38.4	LDP hold
Oita 1st	Shuji Kira	DPJ	Shuji Kira	DPJ	94,594	39.3	3,927	Seiichi Eto	Ind.	37.6	DPJ hold
Oita 2nd	Seishirō Etō	LDP	Seishirō Etō	LDP	116,837	51.5	21,820	Yasumasa Shigeno	SDP	41.9	LDP hold
Oita 3rd	Takeshi Iwaya	LDP	Takeshi Iwaya	LDP	127,656	53.1	14,823	Katsuhiko Yokomitsu	DPJ	46.9	LDP hold
Miyazaki 1st	Nariaki Nakayama	LDP	Nariaki Nakayama	LDP	121,355	56.9	64,465	Takashi Yonezawa	DPJ	26.7	LDP hold
Miyazaki 2nd	Taku Etō	Ind.	Taku Etō	Ind.	101,809	47.2	39,830	Mitsuhiro Uesugi	LDP	28.8	Ind. hold
Miyazaki 3rd	Yoshihisa Furukawa	Ind.	Yoshihisa Furukawa	Ind.	102,816	49.6	20,612	Tetsuji Mochinaga	LDP	39.6	Ind. hold
Kagoshima 1st	Okiharu Yasuoka	LDP	Okiharu Yasuoka	LDP	112,437	53.5	24,153	Hiroshi Kawauchi	DPJ	42.0	LDP hold
Kagoshima 2nd	Torao Tokuda	LL	Takeshi Tokuda	Ind.	87,737	42.9	15,879	Shuko Sonoda	LDP	35.1	Ind. gain from LL
Kagoshima 3rd	Kazuaki Miyaji	LDP	Kazuaki Miyaji	LDP	92,291	47.9	23,483	Tadahiro Matsushita	Ind.	35.7	LDP hold
Kagoshima 4th	Sadatoshi Ozato	LDP	Yasuhiro Ozato	LDP	110,258	59.0	40,337	Kenichi Hamada	DPJ	37.4	LDP hold
Kagoshima 5th	Hiroshi Moriyama	Ind.	Hiroshi Moriyama	Ind.	110,457	62.6	54,649	Masatake Yone	LDP	31.6	Ind. hold
Okinawa 1st	Taiichi Shiraho	Komei	Mikio Shimoji	Ind.	72,384	43.8	4,844	Taiichi Shiraho	Komei	40.8	Ind. gain from Komei
Okinawa 2nd	Kantoku Teruya	SDP	Kantoku Teruya	SDP	71,861	46.7	11,321	Osamu Ashitomi	LDP	39.3	SDP hold
Okinawa 3rd	Chiken Kakazu	LDP	Chiken Kakazu	LDP	72,407	42.5	21,333	Mitsuko Tomon	SDP	30.0	LDP hold
Okinawa 4th	Kosaburo Nishime	LDP	Kosaburo Nishime	LDP	68,419	49.0	26,887	Tadahiro Miyakuni	DPJ	29.8	LDP hold

Proportional representation results
Party	Votes	Seats	Rank	Elected member	Constituency	Ratio
LDP	2,883,048 (37.1%)	9	1	Motoko Hirotsu	Saga 3rd	56.0%
LDP	2,883,048 (37.1%)	9	3	Seiji Nakamura		
LDP	2,883,048 (37.1%)	9	4	Ren Sato	Oita 1st	48.8%
LDP	2,883,048 (37.1%)	9	5	Takeshi Hayashida		
LDP	2,883,048 (37.1%)	9	6	Kozo Yamamoto	Fukuoka 11th	99.4%
LDP	2,883,048 (37.1%)	9	6	Minoru Kihara	Kumamoto 1st	97.8%
LDP	2,883,048 (37.1%)	9	6	Nobuhiko Endō	Fukuoka 1st	92.9%
LDP	2,883,048 (37.1%)	9	6	Tsutomu Tomioka	Nagasaki 1st	92.2%
LDP	2,883,048 (37.1%)	9	6	Osamu Ashitomi	Okinawa 2nd	84.2%
DPJ	2,287,753 (29.4%)	7	1	Kazuhiro Haraguchi	Saga 1st	89.1%
DPJ	2,287,753 (29.4%)	7	1	Masahiko Yamada	Nagasaki 3rd	88.5%
DPJ	2,287,753 (29.4%)	7	1	Katsuhiko Yokomitsu	Oita 3rd	88.3%
DPJ	2,287,753 (29.4%)	7	1	Kenji Kitahashi	Fukuoka 9th	87.8%
DPJ	2,287,753 (29.4%)	7	1	Issei Koga	Fukuoka 6th	83.2%
DPJ	2,287,753 (29.4%)	7	1	Hiroshi Kawauchi	Kagoshima 1st	78.5%
DPJ	2,287,753 (29.4%)	7	1	Hiroshi Ogushi	Saga 2nd	76.5%
Komei	1,240,007 (15.9%)	3	1	Takenori Kanzaki		
Komei	1,240,007 (15.9%)	3	2	Junji Higashi		
Komei	1,240,007 (15.9%)	3	3	Yasuyuki Eda		
SDP	607,008 (7.8%)	1	1	Yasumasa Shigeno	Oita 2nd	81.3%
JCP	451,158 (5.8%)	1	1	Seiken Akamine	Okinawa 1st	31.9%

== Leaders' races ==
Results for party leaders
Party	Member	Constituency	Votes	%	Position	Status
LDP	Junichiro Koizumi	Kanagawa 11th	197,037	73.2	1st	Re-elected
DPJ	Katsuya Okada	Mie 3rd	140,954	60.1	1st	Re-elected
Komei	Takenori Kanzaki	Kyushu PR	1,240,007	15.9	1st	Re-elected
JCP	Kazuo Shii	South Kanto PR	566,945	6.8	1st	Re-elected
SDP	Mizuho Fukushima	House of Councillors				
PNP	Tamisuke Watanuki	Toyama 3rd	120,083	41.3	1st	Re-elected
Daichi	Muneo Suzuki	Hokkaido PR	433,938	13.4	1st	Elected
NPN	Yasuo Tanaka	Governor of Nagano				

== Closest races ==
Candidates with a narrow loss ratio of over 90%
Constituency	Candidate		Votes	%	Ratio
Kyoto 4th	Hideo Tanaka	Ind.	75,036	28.9	99.8
Shiga 3rd	Osamu Uno	LDP	74,006	46.7	99.6
Yamaguchi 2nd	Hideo Hiraoka	DPJ	103,734	46.8	99.4
Fukuoka 11th	Kozo Yamamoto	LDP	78,308	39.3	99.4
Chiba 4th	Mikio Fujita	LDP	128,890	44.6	99.3
Fukui 1st	Ryuzo Sasaki	DPJ	50,869	33.2	99.3
Shizuoka 7th	Minoru Kiuchi	Ind.	62,039	36.4	99.1
Kyoto 3rd	Koichiro Shimizu	LDP	91,429	42.3	99.1
Saitama 6th	Kazuyuki Nakane	LDP	121,665	45.1	98.8
Gunma 2nd	Takashi Ishizeki	DPJ	98,497	46.6	98.6
Yamanashi 2nd	Kotaro Nagasaki	LDP	62,821	37.5	98.5
Osaka 17th	Shingo Nishimura	DPJ	89,276	42.6	98.4
Miyagi 1st	Kazuko Kōri	DPJ	115,264	46.5	98.3
Hokkaido 2nd	Takamori Yoshikawa	LDP	127,031	44.5	98.2
Hokkaido 6th	Eiko Kaneta	LDP	141,009	45.8	98.1
Hyogo 11th	Takeaki Matsumoto	DPJ	110,966	46.5	97.9
Kyoto 4th	Keiro Kitagami	DPJ	73,550	28.9	97.8
Kumamoto 1st	Minoru Kihara	LDP	110,072	46.9	97.8
Saitama 1st	Zenjiro Kaneko	LDP	112,340	43.1	97.5
Okayama 2nd	Seiji Hagiwara	LDP	86,035	45.7	97.5
Yamanashi 3rd	Hitoshi Goto	DPJ	61,716	34.9	96.9
Osaka 2nd	Megumu Sato	Ind.	71,423	31.7	96.6
Tokyo 19th	Yoshinori Suematsu	DPJ	133,180	44.5	96.1
Tokyo 20th	Koichi Kato	DPJ	107,916	42.7	95.8
Oita 1st	Seiichi Eto	Ind.	90,667	37.6	95.8
Kanagawa 9th	Hirofumi Ryu	DPJ	82,878	44.5	95.6
Shizuoka 5th	Toshitsugu Saito	LDP	141,387	46.6	95.5
Tokyo 6th	Yoko Komiyama	DPJ	130,283	44.1	95.3
Saitama 11th	Ryuji Koizumi	Ind.	93,008	38.1	95.0
Shiga 1st	Tatsuo Kawabata	DPJ	89,503	43.6	94.5
Hyogo 3rd	Ryuichi Doi	DPJ	87,182	42.7	94.2
Okayama 4th	Gaku Hashimoto	LDP	96,356	44.6	94.1
Kyoto 2nd	Tomohiro Yamamoto	LDP	69,330	40.2	93.9
Ibaraki 5th	Hideaki Okabe	LDP	70,098	46.3	93.8
Tokyo 18th	Masatada Tsuchiya	LDP	118,879	44.5	93.8
Hiroshima 5th	Mitsuo Mitani	DPJ	91,121	46.4	93.6
Aichi 8th	Yutaka Banno	DPJ	115,200	42.9	93.4
Okinawa 1st	Taiichi Shiraho	Komei	67,540	40.8	93.3
Yamanashi 1st	Masaaki Akaike	LDP	65,426	44.2	93.1
Fukuoka 1st	Nobuhiko Endō	LDP	92,891	43.9	92.9
Hokkaido 4th	Shizuo Sato	LDP	100,170	43.8	92.7
Fukushima 4th	Atsushi Watanabe	LDP	84,803	45.0	92.7
Kochi 1st	Masanori Goto	DPJ	49,704	39.5	92.5
Nagasaki 1st	Tsutomu Tomioka	LDP	101,981	44.6	92.3
Hyogo 12th	Tsuyoshi Yamaguchi	DPJ	106,566	46.2	92.1
Aichi 5th	Hirotaka Akamatsu	DPJ	107,645	44.4	92.0
Kyoto 6th	Kyoko Izawa	LDP	122,969	41.8	92.0
Tottori 2nd	Yoshihiro Kawakami	Ind.	58,909	34.4	91.9
Aichi 4th	Makiko Fujino	LDP	87,824	40.1	91.6
Ibaraki 7th	Keiko Nagaoka	LDP	81,230	38.4	91.2
Hokkaido 7th	Naoto Kitamura	LDP	86,924	43.9	91.0
Chiba 2nd	Hisayasu Nagata	DPJ	112,943	42.6	90.9
Hyogo 6th	Koichiro Ichimura	DPJ	102,055	33.1	90.9
Kumamoto 3rd	Tetsushi Sakamoto	Ind.	78,796	39.7	90.9
Nara 1st	Chubee Kagita	LDP	66,215	33.7	90.6
Hokkaido 3rd	Satoshi Arai	DPJ	125,445	43.7	90.4
Tokyo 21st	Akihisa Nagashima	DPJ	98,749	41.6	90.3
