= 2008 Liberal Democratic Party presidential election =

Political leadership election in Japan

- 22 September 2008
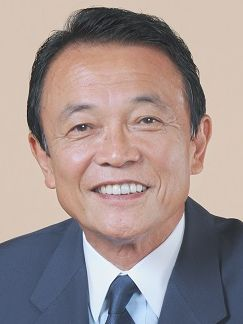

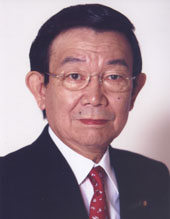

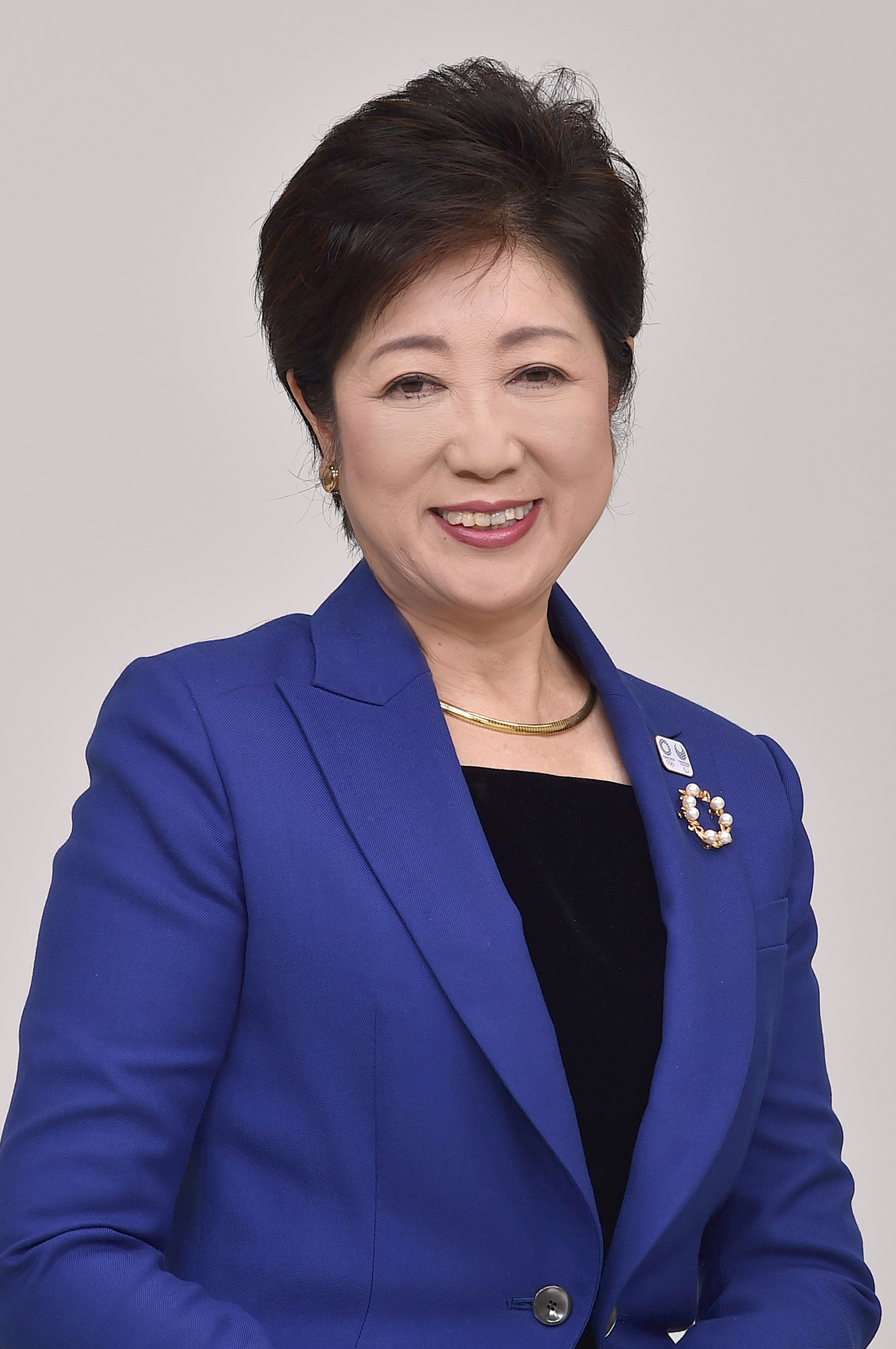

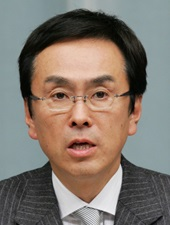

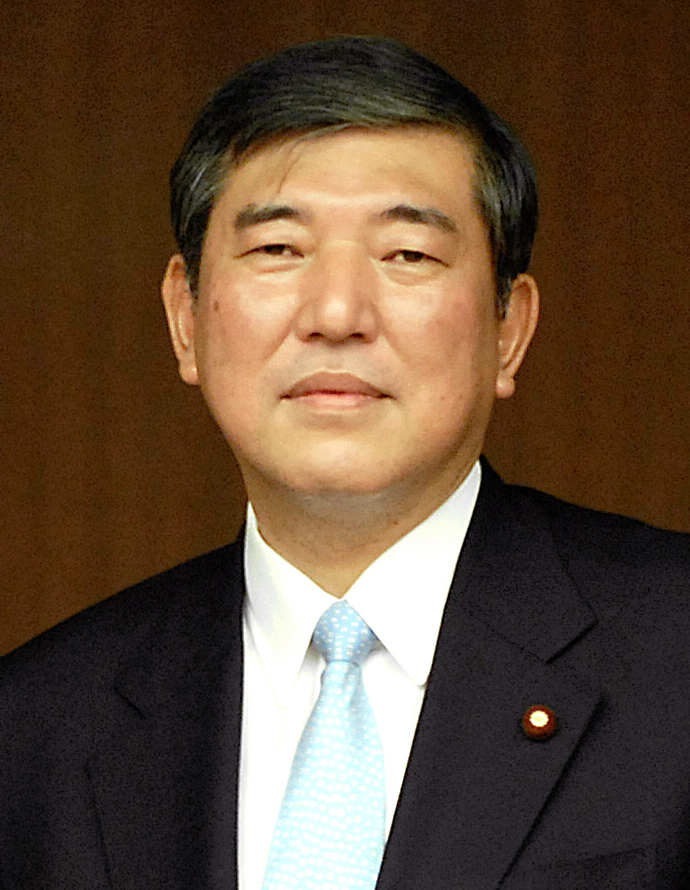
Candidate	Tarō Asō	Kaoru Yosano	Yuriko Koike
Leader's seat	Fukuoka 8th	Tokyo 1st	Tokyo 10th
LDP MPs	217 (56.51%)	64 (16.67%)	46 (11.98%)
Party members	134 (95.03%)	2 (1.42%)	0 (0.00%)
Total	351 (66.86%)	66 (12.57%)	46 (8.76%)
Candidate	Nobuteru Ishihara	Shigeru Ishiba
Leader's seat	Tokyo 8th	Tottori 1st
LDP MPs	36 (9.37%)	21 (5.47%)
Party members	1 (0.71%)	4 (2.84%)
Total	37 (7.05%)	25 (4.76%)
President before election
Yasuo Fukuda
Elected President
Tarō Asō

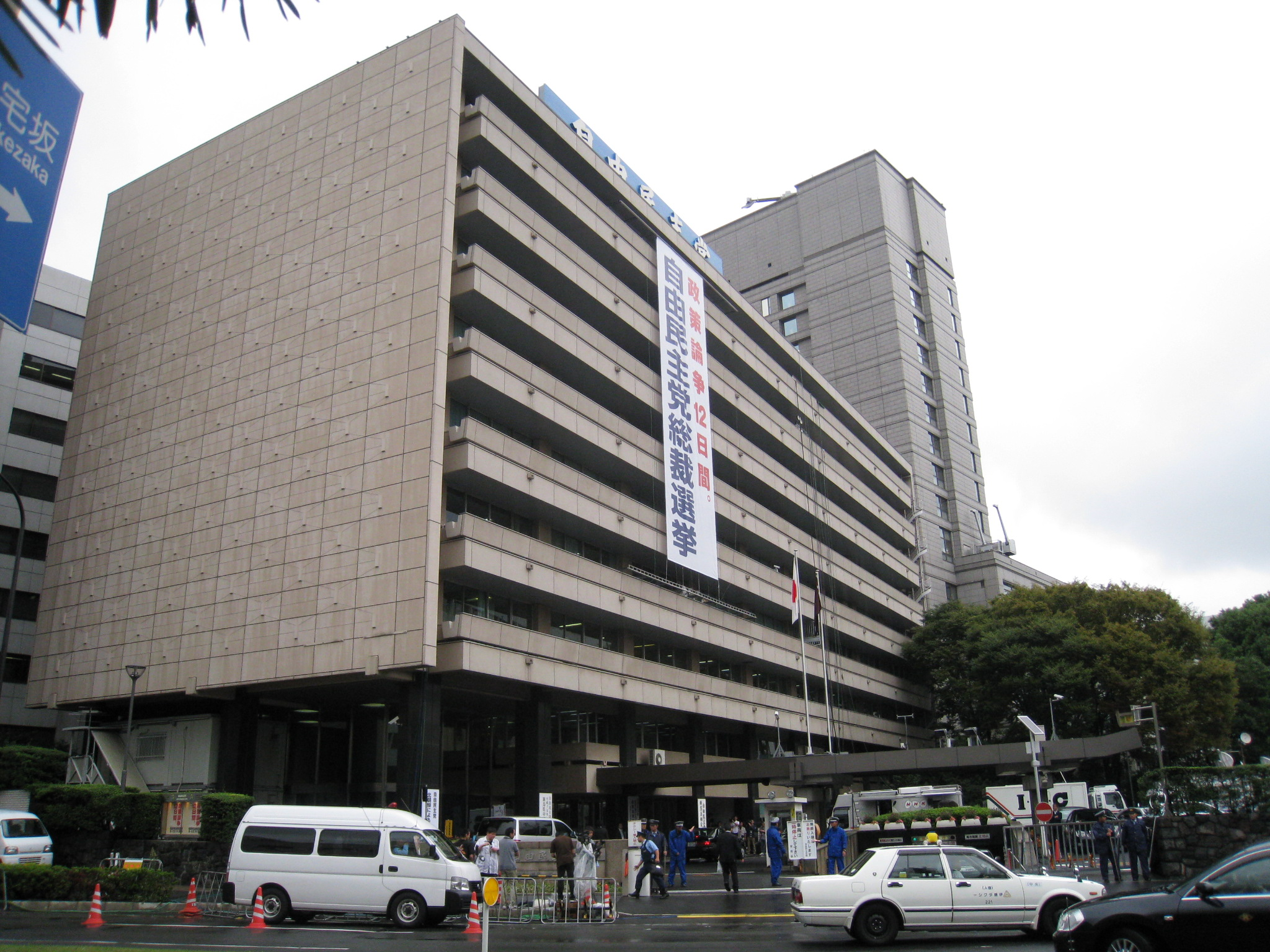
Headquarters of Liberal Democratic Party, at 22 September 2008.

The 2008 Liberal Democratic Party presidential election was held on 22 September 2008 after the incumbent party leader and Prime Minister of Japan Yasuo Fukuda announced that he would resign on 1 September 2008, only 11 months after taking office on 25 September 2007 following a leadership election on 23 September 2007. Tarō Asō, who had lost to Shinzo Abe in the 2006 leadership election and then again lost to Fukuda in 2007, was widely seen as the frontrunner to replace him, and announced on 2 September 2008 he was ready to take over as party leader. Aso won the leadership election against four opponents, receiving 67% of the vote.

It was reported that Yuriko Koike, a former defence chief who is seen as close to former Prime Minister Junichiro Koizumi, might stand against Aso; in that case, the LDP leadership election would be a decision between the conservative traditionalist Aso and the unorthodox reformist Koike. Economics minister Kaoru Yosano and former transport minister Nobuteru Ishihara, the son of the controversial right-wing nationalist governor of Tokyo Shintarō Ishihara, also indicated they might run, as did former defence minister Shigeru Ishiba, senior vice foreign minister Ichita Yamamoto and former science and economic minister Yasufumi Tanahashi. Campaigning began on 10 September 2008; a total of 528 people are eligible to vote (387 Diet members and 141 prefectural representatives).

To stand in the election, candidates had to gather twenty signatures from electors. Aso formally declared his candidacy on 5 September 2008, and Koike on 8 September 2008. Yosano, Ishiba and Ishihara also filed to run, while Yamamoto and Tanahashi decided not to stand for the leadership. Koizumi announced he would support and vote for Koike.

By election day, Aso had secured the votes of at least 60% of the electors and was assumed to win the election in the first round.

Aso went on to win the election by a landslide 351 votes. Yosano got 66 votes, Koike 46, Ishihara 37 and Ishiba 25. Aso was sworn in as Prime Minister on 24 September 2008. Some speculated that a general election would be called on 3 October for 26 October 2008 following the leadership election, but this failed to materialise.

== Candidates ==
=== Declared ===
Candidate(s)	Date of birth	Current position	Party faction	Electoral district
Tarō Asō	20 September 1940 (age 68)	Member of the House of Representatives (1979–1983, since 1986) Previous offices held: Minister for Foreign Affairs (2005–2007); Minister of Internal Affairs and Communications (2003–2005)	Ikōkai (Asō)	Fukuoka 8th
Kaoru Yosano	22 August 1938 (age 70)	Minister of State for Economic and Fiscal Policy (2005–2006, since 2008); Minister of State for Regulatory Reform (since 2008); Member of the House of Representatives (1976–1979, 1980–2000, since 2003) Previous offices held: Minister State for Financial Services (2005–2006)	None	Tokyo 1st
Yuriko Koike	15 July 1952 (age 56)	Member of the House of Representatives (since 1993) Previous offices held: Minister of Defense (2007); Minister of State for Okinawa and Northern Territories Affairs (2004–2006); Minister of the Environment (2003–2006)	Seiwa Seisaku Kenkyūkai (Machimura)	Tokyo 10th
Nobuteru Ishihara	17 April 1957 (age 51)	Member of the House of Representatives (since 1990) Previous offices held: Chairman of the Liberal Democratic Party Policy Research Council (2007); Minister of Land, Infrastructure, Transport and Tourism (2003–2004); Minister for Regulatory Reform (2001–2003)	Kinmirai Seiji Kenkyūkai (Yamasaki)	Tokyo 8th
Shigeru Ishiba	4 February 1957 (age 51)	Member of the House of Representatives (since 1986) Previous offices held: Minister of Defense (2007–2008); Director-General of the Japan Defense Agency (2002–2004)	Heisei Kenkyūkai (Tsushima)	Tottori 1st

== Supporters ==
=== Recommenders ===
Party regulations require candidates to have the written support at least 20 Diet members, known as recommenders, to run.

Tarō Asō

Leader of recommenders

- Kunio Hatoyama (Member of the House of Representatives for Fukuoka 6th district) (Heiseiken)

Campaign Manager

- Yoshinobu Shimamura (Member of the House of Representatives for Tokyo 16th district) (no faction)

Recommenders

- Akira Amari (Member of the House of Representatives for Kanagawa 13th district) (Kinmirai Seiji Kenkyūkai)
- Tomomi Inada (Member of the House of Representatives for Fukui 1st district) (Seiwakai)
- Akinori Eto (Member of the House of Representatives for Aomori 2nd district) (Banchōken)
- Yoshinori Ohno (Member of the House of Representatives for Kagawa 3rd district) (Kinmirai Seiji Kenkyūkai)
- Hiroshi Kajiyama (Member of the House of Representatives for Ibaraki 4th district) (no faction)
- Yoshitami Kameoka (Member of the House of Representatives for Fukushima 1st district) (Seiwakai)
- Yoshitada Konoike (Member of the House of Councillors from Hyōgo) (Ikōkai)
- Yoshihide Suga (Member of the House of Representatives for Kanagawa 2nd district) (Kōchikai)
- Sanae Takaichi (Member of the House of Representatives for Nara 2nd district) (Seiwakai)
- Minoru Terada (Member of the House of Representatives for Hiroshima 5th district) (Kōchikai)
- Shōichi Nakagawa (Member of the House of Representatives for Hokkaido 11th district) (Shisuikai)
- Kyoko Nishikawa (Member of the House of Representatives for Fukuoka 10th district) (Ikōkai)
- Yasukazu Hamada (Member of the House of Representatives for Chiba 12th district) (no faction)
- Hajime Funada (Member of the House of Representatives for Tochigi 1st district) (Heiseiken)
- Keiji Furuya (Member of the House of Representatives for Gifu 5th district) (Shisuikai)
- Tomoyoshi Watanabe (Member of the House of Representatives for Fukuoka 4th district) (Kinmirai Seiji Kenkyūkai)
- Shinya Izumi (Member of the House of Councillors from National PR block) (Atarashii Nami)
- Shinsuke Suematsu (Member of the House of Councillors from Hyōgo) (Seiwakai)
Kaoru Yosano

Leader of recommenders

- Takeshi Noda (Member of the House of Representatives for Kumamoto 2nd district) (Kinmirai Seiji Kenkyūkai)

Campaign Manager

- Hakuo Yanagisawa (Member of the House of Representatives for Shizuoka 3rd district) (Kōchikai)

Recommenders

- Toshiko Abe (Member of the House of Representatives for Chūgoku PR block) (no faction)
- Nobuhiro Omiya (Member of the House of Representatives for Southern Kanto PR block) (no faction)
- Masazumi Gotoda (Member of the House of Representatives for Tokushima 3rd district) (Heiseiken)
- Taizō Sugimura (Member of the House of Representatives for Southern Kanto PR block) (no faction)
- Koichi Tani (Member of the House of Representatives for Hyōgo 5th district) (Shisuikai)
- Tatsuya Tanimoto (Member of the House of Representatives for Wakayama 1st district) (Seiwakai)
- Gen Nakatani (Member of the House of Representatives for Kōchi 2nd district) (Kōchikai)
- Norio Mitsuya (Member of the House of Representatives for Mie 5th district) (Kōchikai)
- Seiichiro Murakami (Member of the House of Representatives for Ehime 2nd district) (Banchōken)
- Yoshitaka Murata (Member of the House of Representatives for Okayama 5th district) (Kōchikai)
- Kenji Wakamiya (Member of the House of Representatives for Tokyo PR block) (Heiseiken)
- Tokio Kano (Member of the House of Councillors from National PR block) (Kōchikai)
- Yoriko Kawaguchi (Member of the House of Councillors from National PR block) (no faction)
- Yoshimasa Hayashi (Member of the House of Councillors from Yamaguchi) (Kōchikai)
- Kazuya Maruyama (Member of the House of Councillors from National PR block) (no faction)
- Masako Mori (Member of the House of Councillors from Fukushima) (Seiwakai)
- Hiromi Yoshida (Member of the House of Councillors from Nagano) (Heiseiken)
- Masashi Waki (Member of the House of Councillors from National PR block) (Heiseiken)
Yuriko Koike

Leader of recommenders

- Seishirō Etō (Member of the House of Representatives for Ōita 2nd district) (Seiwakai)

Campaign Manager

- Seiken Sugiura (Member of the House of Representatives for Aichi 12th district) (Seiwakai)

Recommenders

- Kyoko Izawa (Member of the House of Representatives for Kinki PR block) (Kōchikai)
- Kuniko Inoguchi (Member of the House of Representatives for Tokyo PR block) (no faction)
- Jiro Ono (Member of the House of Representatives for Southern Kanto PR block) (no faction)
- Shinsuke Okuno (Member of the House of Representatives for Nara 2nd district) (Seiwakai)
- Tsukasa Kobiki (Member of the House of Representatives for Hyōgo 8th district) (Seiwakai)
- Yukari Sato (Member of the House of Representatives for Tōkai PR block) (no faction)
- Yosuke Shinoda (Member of the House of Representatives for Tōkai PR block) (Kinmirai Seiji Kenkyūkai)
- Yaichi Tanigawa (Member of the House of Representatives for Nagasaki 3rd district) (Seiwakai)
- Takashi Tanihata (Member of the House of Representatives for Osaka 14th district) (Seiwakai)
- Yasuhide Nakayama (Member of the House of Representatives for Osaka 4th district) (Seiwakai)
- Akihiro Nishimura (Member of the House of Representatives for Miyagi 3rd district) (Seiwakai)
- Hiroshi Hase (Member of the House of Representatives for Ishikawa 1st district) (Seiwakai)
- Chuko Hayakawa (Member of the House of Representatives for Saitama 4th district) (Seiwakai)
- Takuya Hirai (Member of the House of Representatives for Kagawa 1st district) (Kōchikai)
- Junichiro Yasui (Member of the House of Representatives for Tokyo PR block) (Atarashii Nami)
- Yoshimi Watanabe (Member of the House of Representatives for Tochigi 3rd district) (no faction)
- Shinobu Kandori (Member of the House of Councillors from National PR block) (no faction)
- Hiroyuki Yoshiie (Member of the House of Councillors from National PR block) (Seiwakai)
Nobuteru Ishihara

Leader of recommenders

- Takashi Fukaya (Member of the House of Representatives for Tokyo 2nd district) (Kinmirai Seiji Kenkyūkai)

Campaign Manager

- Kisaburo Tokai (Member of the House of Representatives for Hyōgo 10th district) (Kinmirai Seiji Kenkyūkai)

Recommenders

- Osamu Ashitomi (Member of the House of Representatives for Kyushu PR block) (Kinmirai Seiji Kenkyūkai)
- Shigeo Omae (Member of the House of Representatives for Hyōgo 7th district) (no faction)
- Kazuyoshi Kaneko (Member of the House of Representatives for Gifu 4th district) (Kōchikai)
- Ben Kimura (Member of the House of Representatives for Tokyo 15th district) (Kinmirai Seiji Kenkyūkai)
- Fumio Kishida (Member of the House of Representatives for Hiroshima 1st district) (Kōchikai)
- Takashi Kosugi (Member of the House of Representatives for Tokyo 5th district) (no faction)
- Shigeyuki Goto (Member of the House of Representatives for Nagano 4th district) (no faction)
- Yasuhisa Shiozaki (Member of the House of Representatives for Ehime 1st district) (Kōchikai)
- Isshu Sugawara (Member of the House of Representatives for Tokyo 9th district) (no faction)
- Ryotaro Tanose (Member of the House of Representatives for Nara 4th district) (Kinmirai Seiji Kenkyūkai)
- Takumi Nemoto (Member of the House of Representatives for Fukushima 2nd district) (Kōchikai)
- Katsuei Hirasawa (Member of the House of Representatives for Tokyo 17th district) (Kinmirai Seiji Kenkyūkai)
- Mineyuki Fukuda (Member of the House of Representatives for Southern Kanto PR block) (no faction)
- Midori Matsushima (Member of the House of Representatives for Tokyo 14th district) (Seiwakai)
- Fumiaki Matsumoto (Member of the House of Representatives for Tokyo 7th district) (Seiwakai)
- Tsukasa Akimoto (Member of the House of Councillors from National PR block) (Shisuikai)
- Masaharu Nakagawa (Member of the House of Councillors from Tokyo) (Seiwakai)
- Tamayo Marukawa (Member of the House of Councillors from Tokyo) (Seiwakai)
Shigeru Ishiba

Leader of recommenders

- Ichiro Kamoshita (Member of the House of Representatives for Tokyo 13th district) (Heiseiken)

Campaign Manager

- Kenji Kosaka (Member of the House of Representatives for Nagano 1st district) (Heiseiken)

Recommenders

- Ryosei Akazawa (Member of the House of Representatives for Tottori 2nd district) (no faction)
- Tatsuya Ito (Member of the House of Representatives for Tokyo 22nd district) (Heiseiken)
- Hiroshi Imazu (Member of the House of Representatives for Hokkaido PR block) (Heiseiken)
- Yuko Obuchi (Member of the House of Representatives for Gunma 5th district) (Heiseiken)
- Takashi Ōtsuka (Member of the House of Representatives for Osaka 8th district) (Heiseiken)
- Nobuko Okashita (Member of the House of Representatives for Osaka 17th district) (Heiseiken)
- Yoshiro Okamoto (Member of the House of Representatives for Shikoku PR block) (Heiseiken)
- Takahide Kimura (Member of the House of Representatives for Aichi 5th district) (Heiseiken)
- Masatoshi Kurata (Member of the House of Representatives for Tōkai PR block) (Heiseiken)
- Wataru Takeshita (Member of the House of Representatives for Shimane 2nd district) (Heiseiken)
- Naomi Tokashiki (Member of the House of Representatives for Osaka 7th district) (Heiseiken)
- Kosaburo Nishime (Member of the House of Representatives for Okinawa 4th district) (Heiseiken)
- Gaku Hashimoto (Member of the House of Representatives for Chūgoku PR block) (Heiseiken)
- Takeshi Hayashida (Member of the House of Representatives for Kyushu PR block) (Heiseiken)
- Kenji Harada (Member of the House of Representatives for Osaka 9th district) (Heiseiken)
- Hiroshi Hiraguchi (Member of the House of Representatives for Hiroshima 2nd district) (Heiseiken)
- Masahisa Sato (Member of the House of Councillors from National PR block) (Heiseiken)
- Kotaro Tamura (Member of the House of Councillors from Tottori) (Heiseiken)

Number of recommenders by factions

Candidates	Tarō Asō	Kaoru Yosano	Yuriko Koike	Nobuteru Ishihara	Shigeru Ishiba
Atarashii Nami	1	0	1	0	0
Banchō Seisaku Kenkyūjo	1	1	0	0	0
Heisei Kenkyūkai	2	4	0	0	19
Ikōkai	2	0	0	0	0
Kinmirai Seiji Kenkyūkai	3	1	1	6	0
Kōchikai	2	6	2	4	0
Seiwa Seisaku Kenkyūkai	4	2	11	4	0
Shisuikai	2	1	0	1	0
No faction	3	5	5	5	1

== Results ==
Full result
Candidate	Diet members		Party members				Total points	
Candidate	Votes	%	Popular votes	%	Allocated votes	%	Votes	%
Tarō Asō 当	217	56.51%			134	95.03%	351	66.86%
Kaoru Yosano	64	16.67%			2	1.42%	66	12.57%
Yuriko Koike	46	11.98%			0	0.00%	46	8.76%
Nobuteru Ishihara	36	9.37%			1	0.71%	37	7.05%
Shigeru Ishiba	21	5.47%			4	2.84%	25	4.76%
Total	384	100.00%			141	100.00%	525	100.00%
Valid votes	384	99.48%			141	100.00%	525	99.62%
Invalid and blank votes	2	0.52%			0	0.00%	2	0.38%
Turnout	386	100.00%			141	100.00%	527	100.00%
Registered voters	386	100.00%			141	100.00%	527	100.00%

=== Results of Party Members' Votes by Prefectures ===
Results of Party Members' Votes by Prefectures
Prefectures	Tarō Asō			Shigeru Ishiba			Kaoru Yosano			Nobuteru Ishihara			Yuriko Koike		
Prefectures	Votes	%		Votes	%		Votes	%		Votes	%		Votes	%	
Aichi			3			0			0			0			0
Akita			3			0			0			0			0
Aomori	4,915	75.95	3	260	4.02	0	232	3.59	0	514	7.94	0	550	8.50	0
Chiba (Note: Winner take all delegates.)			3			0			0			0			0
Ehime			3			0			0			0			0
Fukui			3			0			0			0			0
Fukuoka			3			0			0			0			0
Fukushima			3			0			0			0			0
Gifu			3			0			0			0			0
Gunma			3			0			0			0			0
Hiroshima			3			0			0			0			0
Hokkaido			3			0			0			0			0
Hyōgo			3			0			0			0			0
Ibaraki			3			0			0			0			0
Ishikawa			3			0			0			0			0
Iwate			3			0			0			0			0
Kagawa			3			0			0			0			0
Kagoshima			3			0			0			0			0
Kanagawa			3			0			0			0			0
Kōchi			2			0			1			0			0
Kumamoto			3			0			0			0			0
Kyoto			3			0			0			0			0
Mie			3			0			0			0			0
Miyagi			3			0			0			0			0
Miyazaki			3			0			0			0			0
Nagano			3			0			0			0			0
Nagasaki			3			0			0			0			0
Nara			2			0			0			1			0
Niigata			3			0			0			0			0
Ōita			3			0			0			0			0
Okayama			3			0			0			0			0
Okinawa			3			0			0			0			0
Osaka			3			0			0			0			0
Saga			3			0			0			0			0
Saitama			3			0			0			0			0
Shiga			3			0			0			0			0
Shimane			2			1			0			0			0
Shizuoka			3			0			0			0			0
Tochigi			3			0			0			0			0
Tokushima			2			0			1			0			0
Tokyo			3			0			0			0			0
Tottori			0			3			0			0			0
Toyama			3			0			0			0			0
Wakayama			3			0			0			0			0
Yamagata			3			0			0			0			0
Yamaguchi			3			0			0			0			0
Yamanashi			3			0			0			0			0
Total			134			4			2			1			0
