= Koizumi Children =

Japanese politician

Koizumi Children (小泉チルドレン, Koizumi Chirudoren) is a popular Japanese political term for the 83 LDP members of the House of Representatives first elected in the 2005 general election. The Koizumi Children were loosely organized into a political association called the 83 Group (83会, hachijūsan kai).

The term is a reference to then-prime minister Junichiro Koizumi, with whom the LDP success in the 2005 elections is closely associated. Some of the children were so-called 'assassins,' candidates hand-picked by Koizumi to defeat LDP party members who opposed his efforts at postal reform. As such, the children are popularly associated with Koizumi's reform-minded policies. Koichi Yamauchi, one of the children, has described the term as "essentially meaningless," arguing that differences among the group such as faction membership and personal background make any description of the children as a group problematic.

In the subsequent 2009 general election, only 10 of the 83 Koizumi Children were re-elected. The 2009 election saw a massive defeat for the ruling LDP and brought the opposition DPJ to power for the first time. Ironically, most of these Koizumi Children were defeated in their districts by candidates who were "parachuted" in by the DPJ and others in a style much like the LDP once adopted. The election also saw a number of young DPJ politicians, all handpicked by DPJ election strategist Ichirō Ozawa, sent to "assassinate" vulnerable LDP seats and subsequently elected in the same manner as the Koizumi Children. As such, these DPJ members of the National Diet were dubbed the "Ozawa Children".

Many of the Koizumi Children defeated in 2009 returned to the House of Representatives in the 2012 general election, and some were later elected to the House of Councillors (the upper house of the National Diet of Japan).

== Koizumi Children and their fates ==
=== Held their seat in 2009 ===
- Toshiko Abe – held seat through 2014 election
- Ryosei Akazawa – held seat through 2014 election
- Tomomi Inada – held seat through 2014 election; served as Minister of Defense in the Abe cabinet
- Shigeo Kitamura – held seat through 2014 election
- Keiko Nagaoka – held seat through 2014 election
- Yasuhiro Ozato – held seat through 2014 election
- Masaaki Taira – held seat through 2014 election
- Takeshi Tokuda – held seat through 2012 election; resigned from the Diet in 2014

=== Defeated in 2009 and returned in 2012 ===
- Jiro Akama
- Tōru Doi
- Mineyuki Fukuda
- Kenji Harada
- Hirotaka Ishihara
- Tadahiko Ito
- Hideki Makihara
- Yoshitami Kameoka
- Kotaro Nagasaki
- Kazuyuki Nakane
- Takashi Ōtsuka
- Taku Otsuka
- Manabu Sakai
- Ryosei Tanaka
- Naomi Tokashiki
- Kenichiro Ueno
- Tomohiro Yamamoto

=== Defeated in 2009 and otherwise returned to the Diet ===
- Masaaki Akaike – elected to House of Councillors in 2013
- Takamaro Fukuoka – elected to House of Councillors in 2010
- Kuniko Inoguchi – served in the Koizumi cabinet; elected to House of Councillors in 2010
- Satsuki Katayama – elected to House of Councillors in 2010
- Yukari Sato – elected to House of Councillors in 2010; returned to House of Representatives in 2014
- Koichiro Shimizu – returned in 2013-14 as replacement for Hideo Higashikokubaru, defeated in 2014

=== Defeated in 2009 and did not return to the Diet ===
- Etsuji Arai – left politics
- Osamu Ashitomi – left politics
- Nobuhiko Endō – left LDP to run for third parties
- Makiko Fujino – left politics
- Yukari Iijima – left politics
- Nobuko Iwaki – defeated in 2009 and 2012; left politics
- Kyoko Izawa – left politics
- Nobuhiro Omiya – defeated in 2009, 2012 and 2014
- Taizō Sugimura – became television personality
- Toshio Ukishima – left politics
