= Atsushi Watanabe =

Atsushi Watanabe may refer to:

- Atsushi Watanabe (politician) (渡部 篤; born 1952), Japanese politician
- Atsushi Watanabe (actor, born 1898) (渡辺 篤; 1898–1977), Japanese actor
- Atsushi Watanabe (actor, born 1947) (渡辺 篤史), Japanese actor
