= Tatsuharu Mawatari =

Japanese politician

- 馬渡 龍治

Member of the House of Representatives
- In office 11 September 2005 – 21 July 2009
- Constituency: Tōkai PR

Personal details
- Born: 26 July 1957 (age 69) Saiki, Ōita, Japan
- Party: Liberal Democratic
- Other political affiliations: Democratic (2000)
- Education: Sophia University

Tatsuharu Mawatari (馬渡 龍治, Mawatari Tatsuharu; born July 26, 1957) is a Japanese politician of the Liberal Democratic Party, a member of the House of Representatives in the Diet (national legislature). A native of Tokyo and graduate of Sophia University, he was elected to the House of Representatives for the first time in 2005. He is an assenter of "The Truth about Nanjing(movie)."
