= Chubee Kagita =

Japanese politician

- 鍵田 忠兵衛

Member of the Nara Prefectural Assembly
- In office 14 April 2011 – 16 December 2011
- Constituency: Nara City
- In office April 1995 – 2004
- Constituency: Nara City

Member of the House of Representatives
- In office 11 September 2005 – 13 May 2009
- Constituency: Kinki PR

Mayor of Nara
- In office 28 September 2004 – 13 July 2005
- Preceded by: Yasunori Ōkawa
- Succeeded by: Akira Fujiwara

Personal details
- Born: 6 August 1957 Nara City, Nara, Japan
- Died: 16 December 2011 (aged 54) Jeju, South Korea
- Party: Liberal Democratic
- Spouse: Michiko Kagita
- Parent: Chūzaburō Kagita (father)
- Education: Kokushikan University

Chubee Kagita (鍵田 忠兵衛, Kagita Chūbee; 6 August 1957 – 16 December 2011) was a Japanese politician of the Liberal Democratic Party, a member of the House of Representatives in the Diet (national legislature).

Kagita was born in Nara, son of former House of Representative member Kagita Saburou Tadashi. Kagita graduated from Kokushikan University with a Bachelor's degree in Politics and Economics. He had served in the assembly of Nara Prefecture for three terms since 1995 and became the mayor of Nara in 2004. Resigning as mayor in 2005, he ran unsuccessfully for the mayor of Nara in the same year (defeated by current mayor Gen Nakagawa in the 2009 elections). He was elected to the House of Representatives for the first time in 2005 and resigned in 2009 to run as mayor of Nara.
