= Shingo Nishimura =

Japanese politician

- 西村 眞悟

Member of the House of Representatives
- In office 21 December 2012 – 21 November 2014
- Constituency: Kinki PR
- In office 19 July 1993 – 21 July 2009
- Preceded by: Seat established
- Succeeded by: Multi-member district
- Constituency: Osaka 5th (1993–1996); Osaka 17th (1996–2000); Kinki PR (2000–2003); Osaka 17th (2003–2005); Kinki PR (2005–2009)

Personal details
- Born: 7 July 1948 (age 78) Sakai, Osaka, Japan
- Party: Independent
- Other political affiliations: DRP (1989–1992); DSP (1992–1994); NFP (1994–1998); LP (1998–2003); DPJ (2003–2010); NRP (2010); SP (2010–2012); JRP (2012–2014); PJK (2014–2018)
- Parent: Eiichi Nishimura (father)
- Relatives: Shōzō Nishimura (cousin)
- Education: Kyoto University

Shingo Nishimura (西村眞悟, Nishimura Shingo; born 7 July 1948) is a former Japanese politician who was a member of the House of Representatives from 1993 to 2014. Nishimura is known for his negationism of Japanese war crimes committed during World War II.

== Background and career ==
A native of Sakai and graduate of Kyoto University Faculty of Law, Nishimura was elected to the Diet for the first time in 1993 after an unsuccessful run the year prior.

On 2005, because of violations of the Lawyer Act, Nishimura is divested his lawyer license.

Three other members of his family have also been members of the House of Representatives:

- his father Eiichi Nishimura (1904-1971) was a former chairman of the Democratic Socialist Party - Shingo is his fourth son
- his father-in-law Okazawa Kanji
- his cousin Shozo Nishimura

== Right-wing positions ==
Affiliated to the openly revisionist lobby Nippon Kaigi, Nishimura was a supporter of right-wing filmmaker Satoru Mizushima's 2007 revisionist film The Truth about Nanjing, which denied that the Nanjing Massacre ever occurred.

Nishimura was among the members of the Nippon Kaigi council at the Diet who signed a full-page advertisement in The Washington Post following the US House Resolution on comfort women. The ad denied Imperial Japan's sexual slavery system: "We must note that it is a gross and deliberate distortion of reality to contend that the Japanese army was guilty of 'coercing young women intro sexual slavery' in 'one of the largest cases of human trafficking in the 20th century'".

In a statement defending mayor of Osaka Tōru Hashimoto in May 2013, Shingo Nishimura made the controversial claim that Japan is full of Korean prostitutes, a comment that led to his expulsion from the Japan Restoration Party.

In the 2014 Japanese general election, Nishimura was defeated.
