= Masaaki Akaike =

Japanese politician (born 1961)

- 赤池 誠章
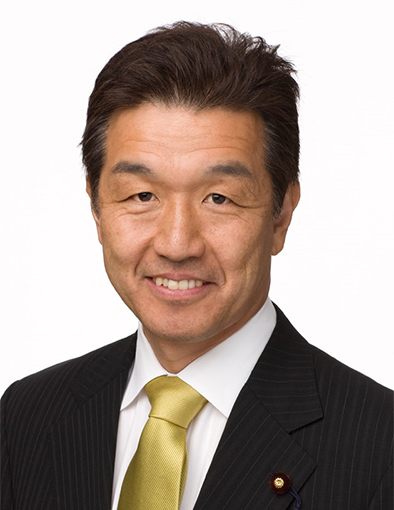
- Official portrait, 2021

Member of the House of Councillors
- In office 29 July 2013 – 28 July 2025
- Constituency: National PR

Member of the House of Representatives
- In office 12 September 2005 – 21 July 2009
- Constituency: Southern Kanto PR

Personal details
- Born: 19 July 1961 (age 65) Kōfu, Yamanashi, Japan
- Party: Liberal Democratic (since 2005)
- Other political affiliations: Renewal (1993–1994); New Frontier (1994–1998); Independent (1998–2005)
- Education: Meiji University

Masaaki Akaike (赤池 誠章, Akaike Masaaki; born 19 July 1961) is a Japanese politician of the Liberal Democratic Party, who served as a member of the House of Representatives and the House of Councillors in the Diet (national legislature).

== Career ==
A native of Kōfu, Yamanashi and graduate of Meiji University, where he is a visiting scholar, Akaike was elected to the House of Representatives for the first time in 2005 after three unsuccessful runs in 1993, 1995 and 2000.

== Right-wing positions ==
Affiliated to Nippon Kaigi, Akaike holds views that are consistent with this openly revisionist lobby:

- visits to the controversial Yasukuni shrine
- negation of the Nanjing massacre: supported right-wing filmmaker Satoru Mizushima's 2007 revisionist film The Truth about Nanjing, which denied that the Nanjing Massacre ever occurred,
- negation of the existence of sexual slavery for the Imperial military ('Comfort women'): among the people who signed ‘THE FACTS’, an ad published in The Washington Post on 14 June 2007, in order to protest against United States House of Representatives House Resolution 121.
- supports the revision of the constitution, the return to militarism

Akaike is a member of the following Diet groups:

- Diet Celebration League of the 20th Anniversary of His Majesty The Emperor's Accession to the Throne (天皇陛下御即位二十年奉祝国会議員連盟)
- Nippon Kaigi Diet discussion group (日本会議国会議員懇談会)
- Meeting to verify the truth of the comfort women issue and Nanjing incident (慰安婦問題と南京事件の真実を検証する会)
- Permanent study sessions to carefully think about the vote of foreigners in local elections (永住外国人の地方参政権を慎重に考える勉強会)
- Pro-Yasukuni Alliance (みんなで靖国神社に参拝する国会議員の会)
- Association against human rights bill (人権擁護法案から人権を守る会)

== See also ==
- Koizumi Children
