= Zenjiro Kaneko =

Japanese politician (born 1943)

- 金子 善次郎
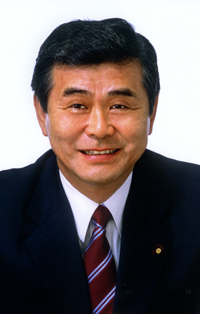
- Official portrait, 2008

Member of the House of Representatives
- In office 11 September 2005 – 21 July 2009
- Constituency: Northern Kanto PR
- In office 25 June 2000 – 10 October 2003
- Constituency: Northern Kanto PR

Personal details
- Born: 24 September 1943 (age 83) Kawanishi, Yamagata, Japan
- Party: Liberal Democratic
- Other political affiliations: NFP (1996–1998); DPJ (1998–2002); NCP (2002–2003)
- Education: Hitotsubashi University

Zenjiro Kaneko (金子 善次郎, Kaneko Zenjirō; born 24 September 1943) is a Japanese politician of the Liberal Democratic Party, a member of the House of Representatives in the Diet (national legislature). A native of Yamagata Prefecture and graduate of Hitotsubashi University, he worked at the Ministry of Home Affairs. He was elected for the first time in 2000 as a member of the Democratic Party of Japan (DPJ) but lost his seat three years later after defecting from the DPJ to join the second incarnation of the New Conservative Party. He was re-elected in 2005 as a representative for the LDP.
