= The Truth About Nanjing =

2008 Japanese propaganda film

The Truth About Nanjing (南京の真実, Nankin no shinjitsu) is a 2007 Japanese film by Satoru Mizushima that is widely considered to advocate for denial or revisionism of the 1937 Nanjing Massacre.

== Background and funding ==
Mizushima said he received more than 200 million yen (US$1.8 million) in donations from 5,000 of his supporters in order to fund the film. The film was backed by nationalistic figures including Tokyo governor Shintaro Ishihara and was intended to expose what the filmmakers saw as propaganda aspects of the Nanjing Massacre. Less than a month before the 70th anniversary of the Nanjing massacre, the director said in an interview that Japanese war criminals were martyrs who were made into scapegoats for war crimes, as Jesus Christ was nailed to the cross in order to bear the sins of the world, and they died bearing all of old Japan's good and bad parts. Contrary to the scholarly consensus, he also claimed that the Nanjing Massacre was a politically motivated frame-up by China and the numerous Western eyewitnesses whose accounts form the basis of the historical understanding of the Nanjing Massacre. These accounts were, according to the filmmakers, espionage activities.

The film was based on the work of Asia University professor Shūdō Higashinakano, who has claimed the massacre was a hoax. Higashinakano was ordered by a Japanese court to pay compensation to a Chinese woman after he accused her of lying about being a victim of violence by the Japanese in Nanjing.

Mizushima said that the project was meant to counter the film Nanking, a 2007 American documentary, which he claimed was "based on fabrications and gives a false impression" and which he perceives to be a "setup by China to control intelligence".

== Plot ==
The Truth About Nanjing is a three-part film.

- The first section was "Seven condemned criminals" (The theme is Class A war criminals.)

This part shows the last day of the seven people who were condemned to death in 1948 by the International Military Tribunal for the Far East and executed on 23 December 1948 at Sugamo Prison, Tokyo. The film focuses on Iwane Matsui's campaign in Nanjing through flashbacks. Focus is put on each of the seven men.

- The second section was for verification. (Documentary)
- The third section was for America. (Drama)

== Cast ==
The cast of the first part

- Kenkichi Hamahata – Iwane Matsui
- Jun Fujimaki– Hideki Tōjō
- Minori Terada – Kōki Hirota
- Shōhei Yamada – Seishirō Itagaki
- Kuniyasu Atsumi – Kenji Doihara
- Baiken Jukkanji – Akira Mutō
- Akira Kubo – Heitarō Kimura
- Kan Mikami – Shinshō Hanayama, chaplain of Sugamo Prison
- Kyōko Kamimura – Fumiko Matsui, wife of Iwane Matsui
- Setsuko Karasuma – Shizuko Hirota, wife of Kōki Hirota

== Reactions ==
Tokushi Kasahara, a professor at Tsuru University, said other countries were making faithful documentaries and "it is shameful that Japan can only make this kind of film."

=== Support in Japan ===
Journalist Yoshiko Sakurai and a number of serving national-level Japanese politicians came out in support of the film.

- House of Representatives:
  - Shingo Nishimura (independent)
  - Jin Matsubara (Democratic Party of Japan)
  - Tōru Toida (Liberal Democratic Party)
  - Atsushi Watanabe (Liberal Democratic Party)
  - Masaaki Akaike (Liberal Democratic Party)
  - Eiichiro Washio (Democratic Party of Japan)
  - Hirofumi Ryu (Democratic Party of Japan)
  - Yohei Matsumoto (Democratic Party of Japan)
  - Tomomi Inada (Liberal Democratic Party)
- House of Councillors:
  - Shimpei Matsushita (independent)
  - Yasuhiro Oe (Liberal Democratic Party)
  - Nariaki Nakayama (Liberal Democratic Party)

== See also ==
- Japanese war crimes
- The Rape of Nanking
- Japanese nationalism
- Japanese militarism
- Historical negationism
- Uyoku dantai
- Jasenovac – istina
- Europa: The Last Battle
