= Toshio Ukishima =

Japanese politician (born 1949)

- 浮島 敏男

Member of the House of Representatives
- In office 11 September 2005 – 21 July 2009
- Constituency: Southern Kanto PR

Personal details
- Born: 1 January 1949 (age 77) Shinagawa, Tokyo, Japan
- Party: Liberal Democratic

Toshio Ukishima (浮島 敏男, Ukishima Toshio; born 1 January 1949) is a Japanese politician of the Liberal Democratic Party, a member of the House of Representatives in the Diet (national legislature). A native of Tokyo and a high school graduate, he was elected for the first time in 2005 after working at a manufacturer of soft drinks.

== See also ==
- Koizumi Children
