= Motoko Hirotsu =

Japanese politician (born 1953)

- 広津 素子

Member of the House of Representatives
- In office 11 September 2005 – 21 July 2009
- Constituency: Kyushu PR

Personal details
- Born: 16 May 1953 (age 73) Karatsu, Saga, Japan
- Party: Liberal Democratic
- Other political affiliations: Your Party (2009–2010)
- Education: University of Tokyo

Motoko Hirotsu (広津 素子, Hirotsu Motoko; born 16 May 1953) is a Japanese politician of the Liberal Democratic Party, a member of the House of Representatives in the Diet (national legislature). A native of Karatsu, Saga and graduate of the University of Tokyo she was elected to the House of Representatives for the first time in 2005. She represented the 3rd District of Saga prefecture from 2005 until 2009.
