= Yuji Fujii =

Japanese politician

- 藤井 勇治

Mayor of Nagahama
- In office 5 March 2010 – 4 March 2022
- Preceded by: Nobuya Kawashima
- Succeeded by: Nobuyoshi Asami

Member of the House of Representatives
- In office 11 September 2005 – 21 July 2009
- Constituency: Kinki PR

Personal details
- Born: 27 February 1950 (age 76) Torahime, Shiga, Japan
- Party: Liberal Democratic
- Education: Ryukoku University

Yuji Fujii (藤井 勇治, Fujii Yūji; born 27 February 1950) is a Japanese politician of the Liberal Democratic Party, a member of the House of Representatives in the Diet (national legislature). A native of Torahime, Shiga and graduate of Ryukoku University, he ran unsuccessfully for the assembly of Shiga Prefecture. He was elected to the House of Representatives for the first time in 2005, and represents the 2nd District of Shiga prefecture.
