= Gen Nakagawa =

Japanese politician

- 仲川元庸
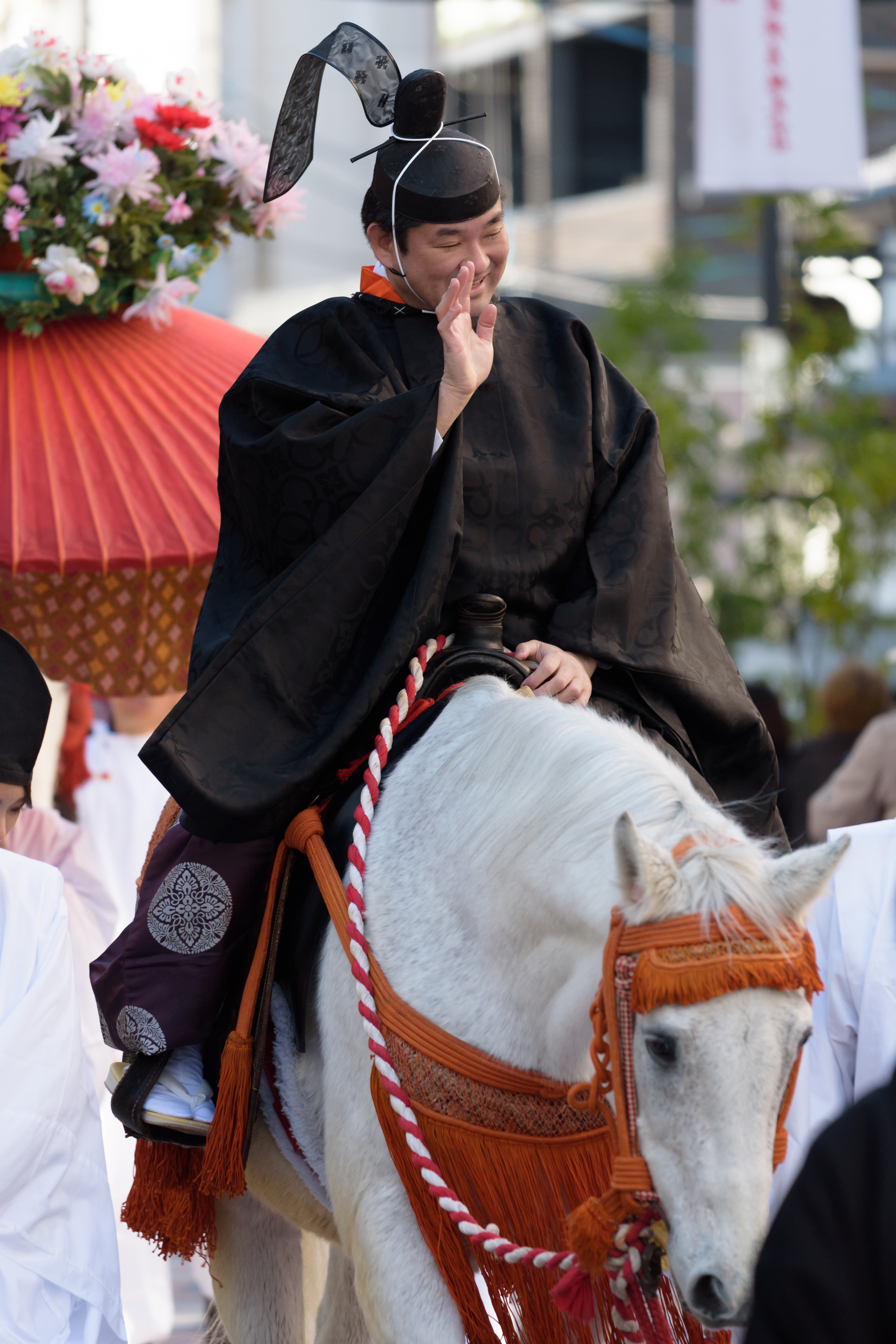
- Photo of Motonobu Nakagawa

Mayor of Nara
- Incumbent
- Assumed office 31 July 2009
- Preceded by: Akira Fujiwara

Personal details
- Born: March 6, 1976 (age 50) Heguri, Nara, Japan
- Party: Independent
- Education: Ritsumeikan University
- Occupation: Economist
- Website: OFFICIAL WEB SITE

Gen Nakagawa, full name Motonobu Nakagawa (仲川元庸), has been the mayor of Nara, capital city of Nara Prefecture, Japan, since 2009. He is politically independent. Nakagawa supports investing more in child care.
