= Hideo Tanaka =

Hideo Tanaka may refer to:

- Hideo Tanaka (runner) (born 1909), Japanese Olympic athlete
- Hideo Tanaka (director) (1933–2011), Japanese film director
- Hideo Tanaka (footballer) (born 1983), Japanese football player
