= Yōsuke Shinoda =

Japanese politician

- 篠田 陽介

Member of the House of Representatives
- In office 11 September 2005 – 21 July 2009
- Constituency: Tōkai PR

Personal details
- Born: 23 March 1973 (age 53) Kitami, Hokkaido, Japan
- Party: Independent
- Other political affiliations: LDP (2005–2010); Your Party (2010–2011)
- Education: Nagoya Institute of Technology

Yōsuke Shinoda (篠田 陽介, Shinoda Yōsuke; born 23 March 1973) is a Japanese politician of the Liberal Democratic Party, a member of the House of Representatives in the Diet (national legislature). A native of Kitami, Hokkaido and graduate of Nagoya Institute of Technology, he was elected for the first time in 2005 after working as a secretary for Tsutomu Takebe, a member of the House of Representatives.
