= Nobuhiro Omiya =

Japanese politician

- 近江屋 信広

Member of the House of Representatives
- In office 11 September 2005 – 21 July 2009
- Constituency: Southern Kanto PR

Personal details
- Born: 15 October 1949 (age 76) Ōdate, Akita, Japan
- Party: Independent
- Other political affiliations: LDP (1979–2010); JRP (2012–2014); JIP (2014–2016)
- Education: Chuo University

Nobuhiro Omiya (近江屋 信広, Ōmiya Nobuhiro; born 15 October 1949) is a Japanese politician of the Liberal Democratic Party, a member of the House of Representatives in the Diet (national legislature). A native of Kitaakita District, Akita and graduate of Chuo University, he was elected to the House of Representatives for the first time in 2005.

== See also ==
- Koizumi Children
