= Kyoko Izawa =

Japanese politician (born 1962)

- 井沢 京子

Member of the House of Representatives
- In office 11 September 2005 – 21 July 2009
- Constituency: Kinki PR

Personal details
- Born: 16 October 1962 (age 63) Ōta, Tokyo, Japan
- Party: Liberal Democratic
- Education: Nihon University; Keio University

Kyoko Izawa (井沢 京子, Izawa Kyōko; born 16 October 1962) is a Japanese politician of the Liberal Democratic Party, a member of the House of Representatives in the Diet (national legislature). A native of Tokyo, she attended Nihon University as an undergraduate and received MBA from Keio University. She was elected to the House of Representatives for the first time in 2005.

== See also ==
- Koizumi Children
