= Kotaro Nagasaki =

Japanese politician

- 長崎 幸太郎
- Nagasaki in 2026

Governor of Yamanashi Prefecture
- Incumbent
- Assumed office 17 February 2019
- Monarchs: Akihito; Naruhito
- Preceded by: Hitoshi Goto

Member of House of Representatives
- In office 8 December 2012 – 28 September 2017
- Preceded by: Takehiro Sakaguchi
- Succeeded by: Noriko Horiuchi
- Constituency: Yamanashi 2nd
- In office 11 September 2005 – 21 July 2009
- Constituency: Southern Kanto PR

Personal details
- Born: 18 August 1968 (age 58) Tokyo, Japan
- Party: Liberal Democratic
- Education: Tokyo University; Cornell Law School
- Website: Official website

Kotaro Nagasaki (長崎 幸太郎, Nagasaki Kōtarō; born 18 August 1968) is a Japanese politician who has served as the governor of Yamanashi Prefecture since 2019. He formerly served as a member of the House of Representatives in the National Diet as a member of the Liberal Democratic Party. A native of Tokyo and graduate of the University of Tokyo he joined the Ministry of Finance in 1991. He graduated from Cornell Law School in the United States while still in the ministry. In 2005 he left the ministry and was elected to the Diet for the first time. In 2019 he was elected governor of Yamanashi Prefecture with 49.7% of the vote in a single round.
