= Atsushi Watanabe (politician) =

Japanese politician

- 渡部 篤
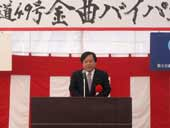
- Watanabe in 2005

Member of the House of Representatives
- In office 11 September 2005 – 21 July 2009
- Constituency: Tohoku PR

Member of the Fukushima Prefectural Assembly
- In office 1991–2005
- Constituency: Kitaaizu District

Member of the Aizuwakamatsu City Council
- In office 1982–1990

Personal details
- Born: 12 April 1952 (age 74) Aizuwakamatsu, Fukushima, Japan
- Party: Liberal Democratic
- Education: Komazawa University

Atsushi Watanabe (渡部 篤, Watanabe Atsushi; born 12 April 1952) is a Japanese politician of the Liberal Democratic Party, a member of the House of Representatives in the Diet (national legislature). A native of Aizuwakamatsu, Fukushima and graduate of Komazawa University, he was elected to the first of his two terms in the city assembly of Aizuwakamatsu in 1982, to the first of his four terms in the assembly of Fukushima Prefecture and to the first of his terms in the House of Representatives in 2005.

== Right-wing positions ==
He was a supporter of right-wing filmmaker Satoru Mizushima's 2007 film The Truth about Nanjing, which denied that the Nanking Massacre ever occurred.
