= Tsukasa Kobiki =

Japanese politician

- 木挽 司

Member of the House of Representatives
- In office 11 September 2005 – 21 July 2009
- Preceded by: Koichiro Ichimura
- Succeeded by: Koichiro Ichimura
- Constituency: Hyōgo 6th

Member of the Itami City Council
- In office 2003–2005

Personal details
- Born: 18 October 1958 (age 67) Nishinomiya, Hyōgo, Japan
- Party: Liberal Democratic
- Education: Kansai University

Tsukasa Kobiki (木挽 司, Kobiki Tsukasa; born 18 October 1958) is a former Japanese politician of the Liberal Democratic Party, who served as a member of the House of Representatives in the Diet (national legislature). A native of Nishinomiya, Hyogo and graduate of Kansai University, he was elected to the House of Representatives for the first time in 2005 after serving in the city assembly of Itami, Hyogo.
