= Osamu Ashitomi =

Japanese politician (born 1956)

- 安次富 修

Member of the House of Representatives
- In office 11 September 2005 – 21 July 2009
- Constituency: Kyushu PR

Member of the Okinawa Prefectural Assembly
- In office 1990–2005
- Constituency: Ginowan City

Member of the Ginowan City Council
- In office 1978–1990

Personal details
- Born: 20 February 1956 (age 70) Nakagami, Okinawa, USCAR
- Party: Liberal Democratic
- Education: Asia University

Osamu Ashitomi (安次富 修, Ashitomi Osamu; born 20 February 1956) is a Japanese politician of the Liberal Democratic Party, a member of the House of Representatives in the Diet (national legislature). A native of Futenma, Okinawa and graduate of Asia University, he served in the city assembly of Ginowan, Okinawa for three terms. He was elected to the first of his four term in the assembly of Okinawa Prefecture in 1996 and then to the House of Representatives for the first time in 2005. In the meantime, he ran unsuccessfully for the mayor of Ginowan in 2003.

== See also ==
- Koizumi Children
