= Taizō Sugimura =

Japanese politician

- 杉村 太蔵

Member of the House of Representatives
- In office 12 September 2005 – 21 July 2009
- Constituency: Southern Kanto PR

Personal details
- Born: 13 August 1979 (age 47) Asahikawa, Hokkaido, Japan
- Party: Liberal Democratic
- Other political affiliations: Sunrise (2010–2011)
- Spouse: Aya Kazama (m. 2006)
- Education: University of Tsukuba; Keio University
- Website: www.sugimurataizo.jp

Taizō Sugimura (杉村 太蔵, Sugimura Taizō; born 13 August 1979) is a Japanese politician and a member of the Diet of Japan, representing the Liberal Democratic Party until 2009. He ran in House of Councillors election in 2010 as a proportional candidate of the Sunrise Party of Japan.

Sugimura was born in Asahikawa, Hokkaidō. He attended the University of Tsukuba but dropped out in 2004.

Sugimura became the youngest member of the House of Representatives after the 11 September 2005 general election. He was not expected to win a seat, as he had been placed in 35th position on the LDP's proportional representation ticket for the Minami-Kanto bloc.

He first came to media attention for his excitement at the prospect of the range of perks available for elected politicians, including high class restaurants, first class travel on the Shinkansen, and being able to afford a BMW. Sugimura was reprimanded by LDP executives for his comments, and publicly apologised at a news conference on 27 September 2005, saying they had been "immature and irresponsible".

Sugimura is a character in a satirical mahjong manga Mudazumo Naki Kaikaku.

Sugimura announced his engagement with Aya Kazama (風間文) on 14 March 2006, and their daughter was born on 4 April 2007.

== See also ==
- Koizumi Children
