= Junichiro Yasui =

Japanese politician

- 安井 潤一郎

Member of the House of Representatives
- In office 11 September 2005 – 21 July 2009
- Constituency: Tokyo PR

Personal details
- Born: 19 February 1950 (age 76) Shinjuku, Tokyo, Japan
- Party: Liberal Democratic
- Education: Waseda University

Junichiro Yasui (安井 潤一郎, Yasui Jun'ichirō; born 10 February 1950) is a Japanese politician of the Liberal Democratic Party, a member of the House of Representatives in the Diet (national legislature). A native of Shinjuku, Tokyo and dropout of Waseda University, he was elected to the House of Representatives for the first time in 2005.
