= Mineyuki Fukuda =

Japanese politician

- 福田 峰之
- Official portrait, 2017

Member of the House of Representatives
- In office 19 December 2012 – 28 September 2017
- Constituency: Southern Kanto PR
- In office 11 September 2005 – 21 July 2009
- Constituency: Southern Kanto PR

Member of the Yokohama City Council
- In office 1999–2005
- Constituency: Aoba Ward

Personal details
- Born: 8 April 1964 (age 62) Meguro, Tokyo, Japan
- Party: Independent
- Other political affiliations: LDP (2005–2017); KnT (2017–2018)
- Education: Rikkyo University

Mineyuki Fukuda (福田 峰之, Fukuda Mineyuki; born 8 April 1964) is a Japanese politician of the Liberal Democratic Party, a member of the House of Representatives in the Diet (national legislature).

== Biography ==
A native of Yokohama, Kanagawa and graduate of Rikkyo University, he was elected to the city assembly of Yokohama for the first time in 1999 and to the House of Representatives for the first time in 2005.
