= Fukushima 2nd district =

Japan House of Representatives constituency

- Parliamentary constituency for the Japanese House of Representatives
- Numbered map of Fukushima Prefecture single-member districts
- Prefecture: Fukushima
- Proportional District: Tōhoku
- Electorate: 428,119 (1.888 times the population of Tottori 1st district)

Current constituency
- Created: 1994 (Redistricted in 2022)
- Seats: One
- Party: LDP
- Representative: Taku Nemoto
- Municipalities: Kōriyama, Sukagawa, Tamura, Iwase District, Ishikawa District, Tamura District

Fukushima 2nd district is a constituency of the House of Representatives in the Diet of Japan.

== History ==
Since the electoral reform that took place prior to the 1996 election, Takumi Nemoto of the LDP was continuously elected. The exceptions to this came in 2003, when challenger Teruhiko Mashiko, who was the primary opponent for Nemoto up to 2009 under the New Frontier Party and the Democratic Party of Japan, made his margin of defeat close enough to be elected proportionally. However, he lost the seat in 2005, and did not mount another challenge thereafter. Mashiko instead ran for the House of Councillors.

Nemoto's only defeat in the SMD came in the 2009, when newcomer Kazumi Ota ousted him. Nemoto was not resurrected proportionally. However, Ota defected from the DPJ to People's Life First and then the Tomorrow Party of Japan. As the Tomorrow Party was smashed nationwide in 2012, Ota was routed to third by a Japan Restoration Party candidate as Nemoto returned and safely defeated the other candidates.

He held the district in 2014 and 2017, both times defeating Koki Okabe who was in the DPJ and then merged into Kibō no Tō. The district began to change in 2021, when Yuki Baba, of the CDP (for the first time in the district), challenged Nemoto. While still losing by about nine points, he managed to get revived on the proportional list. This also made Baba, along with Shin Tsuchida, the first members of the Diet to be elected that were born in the Heisei era.

The 2022 redistricting changed the district, moving Nihonmatsu and some rurals areas out of the district and including Sukagawa along with Tamura. Nemoto opted to retire and his son, Taku Nemoto, prepared to run in the 2024 election. However, the CDP opted to have Kōichirō Genba move from the 3rd district to the 2nd, while Baba agreed to run as the number one candidate on the proportional list. Genba safely defeated Taku and a JCP candidate with a majority, as the junior Nemoto was revived proportionally.

== List of representatives ==
Representative	Party	Years served	Notes
Takumi Nemoto	LDP	1996-2009	Lost re-election
Kazumi Ota	DPJ	2009-2012	
Kazumi Ota	PLF	2012	Left DPJ after consumption tax vote
Kazumi Ota	TPJ	2012	Joined TPJ when PLF merged. Lost re-election
Takumi Nemoto	LDP	2012-2024	Retired
Kōichirō Genba	CDP	2024-2026	Ran in 2nd instead of 3rd district
Taku Nemoto	LDP	2026-	

== Election results ==
2026
Party	Candidate	Votes	%	±%
LDP	Taku Nemoto	128,948	52	▲11.46
Centrist Reform	Kōichirō Genba	90,146	36.4	▼17.55
Sanseitō	Risako Ohyama	20,645	8.3	New
JCP	Yumiko Marumoto	6,395	2.6	▼2.91
Independent	Yudai Endo	1,780	0.7	New
Turnout		247,914	60.02	▲4.91
LDP gain from Centrist Reform				

2024
Party	Candidate	Votes	%	±%
CDP	Kōichirō Genba	123,256	53.95	▲8.50
LDP	Taku Nemoto (won a seat in PR block)	92,616	40.54	▼14.01
JCP	Yumiko Marumoto	12,594	5.51	New
Turnout		228,466	55.11	▲0.05
CDP gain from LDP				

2021
Party	Candidate	Votes	%	±%
LDP	Takumi Nemoto	102,638	54.55	▲1.96
CDP	Yuki Baba (won a seat in PR block)	85,501	45.45	New
Turnout		188,139	55.06	▲1.73
LDP hold				

2017
Party	Candidate	Votes	%	±%
LDP	Takumi Nemoto	96,892	52.59	▼2.65
Kibō no Tō	Koki Okabe	59,377	32.23	New
JCP	Yoshihiko Taira	18,279	9.92	▲0.31
Ishin	Emi Nishimura	9,685	5.26	New
Turnout		184,233	53.33	▲4.03
LDP hold				

2014
Party	Candidate	Votes	%	±%
LDP	Takumi Nemoto	91,686	55.24	▲3.13
Democratic	Koki Okabe	58,358	35.16	▲21.35
JCP	Yoshihiko Taira	15,947	9.61	▼4.24
Turnout		165,991	49.30	▼7.44
LDP hold				

2012
Party	Candidate	Votes	%	±%
LDP	Takumi Nemoto	98,913	52.11	▲6.62
Restoration	Kazunori Midorikawa	27,673	14.58	New
Tomorrow	Kazumi Ota	26,821	14.13	New
Democratic	Yasuo Saito	26,208	13.81	▼39.72
JCP	Yoshihiko Taira	10,194	5.37	New
Turnout		189,809	56.74	▼14.77
LDP gain from Tomorrow				

2009
Party	Candidate	Votes	%	±%
Democratic	Kazumi Ota	131,306	53.53	▲11.05
LDP	Takumi Nemoto	111,596	45.49	▼7.30
Happiness Realization	Hidemitsu Sakai	2,397	0.98	New
Turnout		245,299	71.51	▲1.90
Democratic gain from LDP				

2005
Party	Candidate	Votes	%	±%
LDP	Takumi Nemoto	125,447	52.79	▲1.77
Democratic	Teruhiko Mashiko	100,949	42.48	▼1.83
JCP	Katsuro Sato	11,221	4.72	▲0.05
Turnout		237,617	69.61	▲6.33
LDP hold				

2003
Party	Candidate	Votes	%	±%
LDP	Takumi Nemoto	108,838	51.02	▼1.43
Democratic	Teruhiko Mashiko (won a seat in PR block)	94,514	44.31	▲8.39
JCP	Nobuo Matsuzaki	9,968	4.67	▼0.59
Turnout		213,320	63.28	
LDP hold				

2000
Party	Candidate	Votes	%	±%
LDP	Takumi Nemoto	116,835	52.45	▲3.18
Democratic	Teruhiko Mashiko	80,005	35.92	New
Social Democratic	Takeshi Murakami	14,186	6.37	New
JCP	Toshimitsu Tobita	11,714	5.26	▼1.83
Turnout		222,740		
LDP hold				

1996
Party	Candidate	Votes	%	±%
LDP	Takumi Nemoto	100,102	49.27	New
New Frontier	Teruhiko Mashiko	88,661	43.64	New
JCP	Toshimitsu Tobita	14,412	7.09	New
Turnout		203,175		
LDP hold				
