= Kazumi Ota =

Japanese politician (born 1979)

- 太田 和美
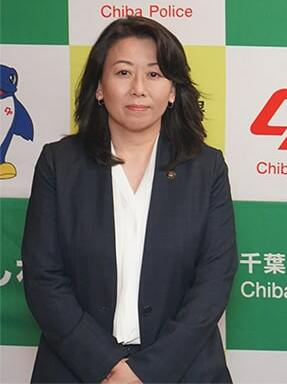
- Ota in 2023

Mayor of Kashiwa
- Incumbent
- Assumed office 21 November 2021
- Preceded by: Hiroyasu Akiyama

Member of the House of Representatives
- In office 19 December 2014 – 28 September 2017
- Constituency: Southern Kanto PR
- In office 23 April 2006 – 16 November 2012
- Preceded by: Kazumi Matsumoto
- Succeeded by: Takumi Nemoto
- Constituency: Chiba 7th (2006–2009); Fukushima 2nd (2009–2012)

Member of the Chiba Prefectural Assembly
- In office 2005–2006
- Constituency: Matsudo City

Personal details
- Born: 28 August 1979 (age 47) Kashiwa, Chiba, Japan
- Party: Independent
- Other political affiliations: DPJ (2005–2012); PLF (2012); TPJ (2012–2013); PLP (2013–2014); JIP (2014–2016); DP (2016–2017); KnT (2017–2018); Reiwa Shinsengumi (2020)
- Education: Nihon University

Kazumi Ota (太田 和美, Ōta Kazumi; born 28 August 1979) is a Japanese politician who is the current mayor of Kashiwa. She has previously served as a member of the House of Representatives in the Diet (national legislature) from 2006 to 2012, and again from 2014 to 2017.

== Political career ==
Kazumi Ota was elected to the Chiba Prefectural Assembly in 2005 and then to the House of Representatives for the first time in 2006 during special by-elections in Chiba 7th district. During 2009 general elections that marked DPJ's landslide victory, Ota was re-elected in Fukushima 2nd district. She lost in 2012 national elections, got elected in 2014 and lost again in 2017.

She once worked as a hostess, which in the past would have likely ignited a scandal but has not presently done so.
