= Chiba 7th district =

Electoral constituency in Chiba Prefecture, Japan

- Parliamentary constituency for the Japanese House of Representatives
- Numbered map of the Chiba Prefecture single seats
- Prefecture: Chiba
- Proportional District: Southern Kanto
- Electorate: 297,486

Current constituency
- Created: 1994
- Seats: One
- Party: LDP
- Representatives: Ken Saitō
- Municipalities: Nagareyama and Noda

Chiba 7th district (千葉県第7区, Chiba-ken dai-nanaku or simply 千葉7区, Chiba-nanaku) is a single-member constituency of the House of Representatives in the national Diet of Japan located in Chiba Prefecture.

== Areas covered ==
=== Since 2022 ===
- Nagareyama
- Noda

=== 2013 - 2022 ===
- Part of Matsudo
- Nagareyama
- Noda

=== 1994 - 2013 ===
- Part of Matsudo
- Nagareyama
- Noda
- Part of Higashi-Katsushika District
  - Sekiyado

== List of representatives ==
Election	Representative	Party	Notes
1996	Kazuna Matsumoto	LDP	
2000	Kazuna Matsumoto	LDP	
2003	Akira Uchiyama	Democratic	
2005	Kazumi Matsumoto	LDP	Resigned on January 18, 2006 because of the electoral scandal.
2006 by-el	Kazumi Ota	Democratic	
2009	Akira Uchiyama	Democratic	
2009	Akira Uchiyama	Kizuna	
2009	Akira Uchiyama	PLF	
2009	Akira Uchiyama	Tomorrow	
2012	Ken Saitō	LDP	
2014	Ken Saitō	LDP	
2017	Ken Saitō	LDP	
2021	Ken Saitō	LDP	
2024	Ken Saitō	LDP	
2026	Ken Saitō	LDP	

== Election results ==
=== 2026 ===
2026
Party	Candidate	Votes	%	±%
LDP	Ken Saitō (Incumbent)	100,339	64.0	▲9.8
DPP	Akihiro Hayashida	40,301	25.7	▼8.2
Genzei–Yukoku	Ryūhei Kawada	16,146	10.3	
Registered electors		298,061		
Turnout			55.03	▲2.34
LDP hold				

=== 2024 ===
2024
Party	Candidate	Votes	%	±%
LDP	Ken Saitō (Incumbent)	82,606	54.17	▼0.82
DPP	Kota Hirado	51,749	33.94	New
JCP	Kiyoko Tokumasu	18,127	11.89	N/A
Majority		30,857	20.23	
Registered electors		296,878		
Turnout			52.69	▼1.85
LDP hold				

=== 2021 ===
2021
Party	Candidate	Votes	%	±%
LDP	Ken Saitō (Incumbent)	127,548	54.99	▲0.46
CDP	Chiharu Takeuchi	71,048	30.63	New
Ishin	Akira Uchiyama	28,594	12.33	New
Anti-NHK	Kunihiro Watanabe	4,749	2.05	New
Majority		56,500	24.36	
Registered electors		434,040		
Turnout			54.54	▲3.12
LDP hold				

=== 2017 ===
2017
Party	Candidate	Votes	%	±%
LDP	Ken Saitō (Incumbent)	115,731	54.53	▼0.52
CDP	Sadamichi Ishizuka	51,776	24.40	New
Kibō no Tō	Rina Hatano	29,706	14.00	New
JCP	Takao Watanabe	15,025	7.07	▼6.47
Majority		63,955	30.13	
Registered electors		421,071		
Turnout			51.42	▲0.01
LDP hold				

=== 2014 ===
2014
Party	Candidate	Votes	%	±%
LDP	Ken Saitō (Incumbent)	111,030	55.05	▲9.24
Innovation	Sadamichi Ishizuka	48,651	24.12	New
JCP	Takao Watanabe	27,306	13.54	▲8.26
Social Democratic	Harumasa Abe	14,718	7.29	▲4.63
Majority		62,379	30.93	
Registered electors		403,843		
Turnout			51.41	▼7.13
LDP hold				

=== 2012 ===
2012
Party	Candidate	Votes	%	±%
LDP	Ken Saitō	104,839	45.81	▲5.10
Restoration	Chikatsu Hayashi	29,665	12.96	New
Democratic	Ken Nakazawa	28,970	12.66	▼36.39
Tomorrow	Akira Uchiyama (Incumbent)	24,216	10.58	New
Your	Sadamichi Ishizuka	22,999	10.05	New
JCP	Takao Watanabe	12,080	5.28	N/A
Social Democratic	Katsuko Murakami	6,096	2.66	▼6.35
Majority		75,174	32.85	
Registered electors		401,267		
Turnout			58.54	▼7.46
LDP gain from Tomorrow				

=== 2009 ===
2009
Party	Candidate	Votes	%	±%
Democratic	Akira Uchiyama	125,647	49.05	▲5.83
LDP	Ken Saitō (Won PR seat)	104,262	40.71	▼8.36
Social Democratic	Keiko Ueda	23,086	9.01	N/A
Happiness Realization	Masahiko Makino	3,140	1.23	New
Majority		21,385	8.34	
Registered electors		396,926		
Turnout			66.00	▲1.25
Democratic hold				

=== 2006 by-election ===
2006 Chiba 7th district by-election
Party	Candidate	Votes	%	±%
Democratic	Kazumi Ota	87,046	45.91	▲2.69
LDP	Ken Saitō	86,091	45.40	▼3.67
JCP	Kiyoko Tokumasu	14,274	7.53	▼0.18
Independent	Shinichiro Miyaoka	1,530	0.81	N/A
Independent	Takanori Kobayashi	681	0.35	New
Majority		955	0.51	
Registered electors				
Turnout				
Democratic gain from LDP				

=== 2005 ===
2005
Party	Candidate	Votes	%	±%
LDP	Kazumi Matsumoto	118,801	49.07	▲7.49
Democratic	Akira Uchiyama (Incumbent) (Won PR seat)	104,630	43.22	▼4.81
JCP	Kiyoko Tokumasu	18,658	7.71	▼0.46
Majority		14,171	5.85	
Registered electors		384,718		
Turnout			64.75	▲9.14
LDP gain from Democratic				

=== 2003 ===
2003
Party	Candidate	Votes	%	±%
Democratic	Akira Uchiyama	96,915	48.03	▲18.30
LDP	Kazumi Matsumoto	83,899	41.58	▲2.80
JCP	Takao Watanabe	16,481	8.17	▼7.07
Independent	Shinichiro Miyaoka	4,485	2.22	New
Majority		13,016	6.45	
Registered electors		382,440		
Turnout			55.61	▼3.49
Democratic gain from LDP				

=== 2000 ===
2000
Party	Candidate	Votes	%	±%
LDP	Kazuna Matsumoto (Incumbent)	81,252	38.78	▲2.40
Democratic	Akira Uchiyama	62,292	29.73	New
JCP	Nanae Senoo	31,930	15.24	▲1.85
Social Democratic	Torao Kitakado	24,432	11.66	New
Liberal League	Kazuo Misumi	9,637	4.59	▲3.07
Majority		18,960	9.05	
Registered electors		373,320		
Turnout			59.10	
LDP hold				

=== 1996 ===
1996
Party	Candidate	Votes	%	±%
LDP	Kazuna Matsumoto	71,306	36.38	New
New Frontier	Etsuro Miyamoto	53,484	27.29	New
Democratic	Kazuko Yuasa	41,980	21.42	New
JCP	Hiroo Wakaōji	26,242	13.39	New
Liberal League	Osamu Imaizumi	2,968	1.52	New
Majority		17,822	9.09	
Registered electors				
Turnout				
LDP win (new seat)				
