= Akira Uchiyama =

Japanese politician

- 内山 晃
- Official portrait, 2010

Member of the House of Representatives; from Southern Kanto
- In office 10 November 2003 – 16 November 2012
- Preceded by: Kazuna Matsumoto
- Succeeded by: Ken Saitō
- Constituency: Chiba 7th (2003–2005); PR block (2005–2009); Chiba 7th (2009–2012)

Personal details
- Born: 3 March 1954 (age 72) Kashiwa, Chiba, Japan
- Party: Innovation (since 2020)
- Other political affiliations: DPJ (before 2011); Kizuna (2011–2012); PLF (2012); TPJ (2012–2013); NPD (2013–2017); KnT (2017–2018); DPP (2018–2020); CDP (2020)
- Education: Senshu University

Akira Uchiyama (内山 晃, Uchiyama Akira; born 3 March 1954) is a former Japanese politician who served as a member of the House of Representatives in the Diet national legislature.

== Overview ==
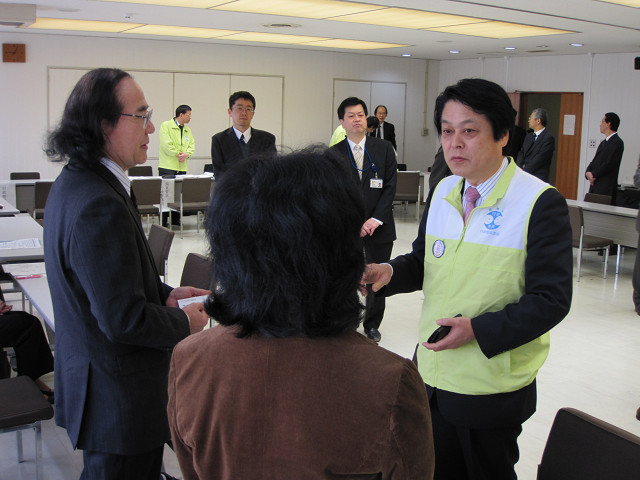
Akira Uchiyama (in Matsudo City, Chiba Prefecture on April 20, 2011)

A native of Kashiwa, Chiba and graduate of Senshu University, he was elected for the first time in 2003 as a member of the Democratic Party of Japan after an unsuccessful run in 2000. He was one of nine lawmakers to resign from the party in December 2011 over an intended consumption tax hike.

Uchiyama and his follow DPJ dissidents launched the Kizuna Party on 4 January 2012 and became the party President.
