= Kizuna Party =

Kizuna Party Japanese: 新党きづな
- President: Akira Uchiyama
- Secretary-General: Koichirō Watanabe
- Founded: December 30, 2011
- Dissolved: November 15, 2012
- Merged into: People's Life First
- Ideology: Liberalism

The Kizuna Party (新党きづな, Shintō Kizuna; New Party Kizuna) was a center-left political party in Japan that was formed in January 2012. The party was created by nine the House of Representatives members who resigned from Prime Minister Yoshihiko Noda's Democratic Party of Japan on December 30, 2011, in protest of the latter's decision to raise to country's consumption tax rate from 5% to 10% in two years.

The new party was formed on January 4, 2012, and led by Akira Uchiyama, the member for the Chiba 7th district in Chiba Prefecture. The party opposed both the proposed consumption tax increase and the Trans-Pacific Partnership (TPP) Free Trade Agreement. The party dissolved less than a year later in November 2012 and merged with the People's Life First party, another party that had been formed in 2012 in the lead up to the December 2012 general election.

== Motions against Prime Minister Yoshihiko Noda ==
On August 3, 2012, the Kizuna Party in concert with six other minor opposition parties (People's Life First, Japanese Communist Party, Social Democratic Party, Your Party, New Party Nippon (which has no lower-house lawmaker) and the New Renaissance Party) agreed to submit a no confidence motion against Prime Minister Yoshihiko Noda in an effort to block the passage of the bill raising Japan's consumption tax from 5% to 10%. In the Japanese diet the support of 51 lawmakers is required to submit a co-confidence motion to the lower house. The motion was submitted to the lower house on August 7, along with a censure motion against Noda. The main opposition Liberal Democratic Party was also considering its own no-confidence motion and censure motions if Noda did not agree to call a general election. The no-confidence motion was voted down 246 to 86, with the DPJ voting against and the LDP and its partner New Komeito deciding to be absent from the vote after Noda agreed to hold elections "soon".

On August 29, 2012, the House of Councillors passed a censure motion against Noda based on the one previously submitted by the seven opposition parties. The LDP and New Komeito had also been preparing their own censure motion but in the end the LDP, which had supported Noda's consumption tax increase, supported the censure motion of the other seven parties, while New Komeito abstained. While the censure motion was non-binding, the opposition parties planned to boycott the remaining sitting days before the diet session finished on September 8, preventing further legislation from being passed.

== Party Dissolution ==
On November 15, 2012, the day Noda called an early election for December 16, 2012, the six members of the Kizuna party (excluding party leader Uchiyama) decided to dissolve and merge with People's Life First, a party founded by Ichirō Ozawa in July 2012. Uchiyama announced he would not join People's Life First and instead planned to cooperate with former People's New Party leader Shizuka Kamei to form a third force in national politics, however he joined the party on November 19. People's Life First merged with other minor parties later in November to contest the election as the Tomorrow Party of Japan. Of the nine members that formed the Kizuna Party, eight lost their seats in the December 2012 election; with the ninth member Mitsuji Ishida choosing not to contest the election and instead retiring from politics.
