= Liberal Party (Japan, 2016) =

Former political party in Japan

Liberal Party 自由党
- President: Ichirō Ozawa
- Secretary-General: Katsumasa Suzuki
- Councilors leader: Ryo Shuhama
- Representatives leader: Denny Tamaki
- Founder: Ichirō Ozawa
- Founded: 28 December 2012
- Dissolved: 26 April 2019
- Merger of: Tomorrow Party of Japan
- Preceded by: People's Life First
- Merged into: Democratic Party For the People
- Headquarters: 2-12-8 Nagatacho; Chiyoda, Tokyo
- Colors: Blue

The Liberal Party (自由党, Jiyū-tō) was a political party in Japan that merged with the Democratic Party For the People on 26 April 2019. It had 2 out of the 475 seats in the House of Representatives, and 3 in the 242-member House of Councillors prior to merging. Formed as the People's Life Party (生活の党) in December 2012, it changed its name to People's Life Party & Taro Yamamoto and Friends (生活の党と山本太郎となかまたち) in December 2014. The party adopted the name Liberal Party in October 2016 in preparation for an expected general election in early 2017.

== History ==
=== Foundation ===
The party's foundation lay in the wake of the December 2012 general election, in which the Tomorrow Party of Japan's membership in the 480-seat House of Representatives was reduced from 61 members to just 9. Tension between President Yukiko Kada and former People's Life First party leader Ichirō Ozawa increased to the point that on 26 December 2012 the party's remaining Diet members that were aligned with Ozawa held a meeting in spite of Kada's instruction not to do so. Members aligned with Kada announced their intention to leave the party and the following day Kada and Ozawa agreed to split the party, just one month after it had formed. The majority of the remaining members sided with Ozawa and the party's name was changed to the People's Life Party (生活の党, Seikatsu-no-tō), with the Tomorrow Party's Deputy President Yuko Mori named as the new party's President.

=== Merger with Taro Yamamoto ===
Logo of People's Life Party & Taro Yamamoto and Friends

The party changed its name to People's Life Party & Taro Yamamoto and Friends in December 2014. The name change was apparently imposed by MP Tarō Yamamoto as a condition for keeping the party from disbanding. At the time, Yamamoto was an independent MP who had been elected in 2013 with the support of the People's Life Party, as well as the Social Democratic Party and Greens Japan.

=== July 2016 House of Councillors election ===
In October 2015 the party expressed the need for the opposition to coordinate in order to overthrow the Abe government, which it sees as a threat to peace and democracy. It specifically outlined a strategy for the 2016 House of Councillors election, similar to the Italian coalition the Olive Tree, where each party keeps its members and identity, while fighting elections under the same banner. During the nomination period for the July 2016 election, the party signed an agreement with the Democratic, Communist and Social Democratic parties to field a jointly-endorsed candidate in each of the 32 districts in which only one seat is contested, uniting in an attempt to take control of the House from the Liberal Democratic Party/Komeito coalition.

Two of the party's three councillors, Ryo Shuhama and Ryoko Tani, announced their intention to retire when their terms expired in July 2016. In April 2016 Shuhama cited the need to care for a seriously ill family member as his reason for not seeking a third term in office. Tani was approached by several parties in the lead up to the election, but Ozawa demanded she remain with the party, as her defection would have meant the party fell below the minimum requirement of five Diet members and lost its official party status. In June 2016 Tani announced her decision to remain with the party until the election, but not seek a second term.

In addition to the independent candidates endorsed by the party subject to the agreement with the other opposition parties, the People's Life Party nominated five candidates for the 48-seat national proportional representation block. The party's number one candidate was Ai Aoki, who had previously served a partial term in the House of Councillors and three terms in the House of Representatives. Former Nagasaki Prefectural Assembly member Seiichi Suetsugu was third on the party's ballot and former councillor Yumiko Himei was listed fourth.

Party member and former Iwate Prefectural Assembly member Eiji Kidoguchi won in the Iwate at-large district as an opposition-backed independent candidate and confirmed he would join the party's Diet group shortly after the election. In the National Block the party received 1.9% of the vote, entitling it to one of the 48 seats being contested. Aoki received 68.9% of the votes cast for the party's five candidates, meaning she was awarded the party's seat. The two seats won meant the party retained the five members necessary to maintain official party status within the Diet.

Former party president Yuko Mori also won as an opposition-backed independent candidate in the Niigata at-large district, which she had previously represented for two terms from 2001 until 2013. However, despite being a member of the party, she chose to sit in the House as an independent. When announcing her decision two weeks after the election, Mori's reasons included the fact that she campaigned as an independent, and also that she had signed an agreement with a citizens' group in which she promised to sit as an independent "for the time being", however she could not specify how long that would be.

=== Liberal Party (October 2016 – April 2019) ===
In October 2016 the party was rebranded as the Liberal Party in preparation for an expected general election in early 2017. However, the two Liberal Party MPs resolved to run as independents, eventually retaining their seats as an informal bloc in the 2017 election.

The party merged into the Democratic Party For the People in April 2019. Leftist factions inside the party, led by Tarō Yamamoto, refused to merge into the DPFP and founded Reiwa Shinsengumi.

== Ideology ==
The Liberal Party supported consumer rights and advocated lower taxes. The party opposed the Comprehensive and Progressive Agreement for Trans-Pacific Partnership and supported abandoning nuclear power.

== Party presidents ==
No.	Name	Image	Term of office	
No.	Name	Image	Took office	Left office
Preceding party: Tomorrow Party
1	Yuko Mori		27 December 2012	25 January 2013
2	Ichirō Ozawa		25 January 2013	27 April 2019
Successor party: Democratic Party For the People

== Diet members ==
=== House of Representatives ===
- Ichirō Ozawa (Iwate 4th district)

=== House of Councillors ===
- Eiji Kidoguchi (Iwate)
- Ai Aoki (National block)
- Tarō Yamamoto (Tokyo)
- Yūko Mori (Niigata)

== Election results ==
=== House of Representatives ===
House of Representatives
Election	Leader	# of seats won	# of Constituency votes	% of Constituency vote	# of PR Block votes	% of PR Block vote
2014	Ichirō Ozawa	2 / 475	514,575	0.97%	1,028,721	1.93%

=== House of Councillors ===
House of Councillors
Election	Leader	# of seats total	# of seats won	# of National votes	% of National vote	# of Prefectural votes	% of Prefectural vote
2013	Ichirō Ozawa	2 / 242	0 / 121	943,837	1.77%	618,355	1.17%
2016	Ichirō Ozawa	2 / 242	1 / 121	1,067,301	1.91%	-	-
