= Ryo Shuhama =

Japanese politician

- 主濱 了
- Official portrait, 2009

Mayor of Takizawa
- In office 20 November 2018 – 19 November 2022
- Preceded by: Norihide Yanagimura
- Succeeded by: Satoru Takeda

Member of the House of Councillors
- In office 26 July 2004 – 25 July 2016
- Preceded by: Motoo Shiina
- Succeeded by: Eiji Kidoguchi
- Constituency: Iwate at-large

Personal details
- Born: 2 April 1950 (age 76) Iwate District, Iwate, Japan
- Party: Independent (since 2018)
- Other political affiliations: Democratic (2004–2012); People's Life First (2012); Tomorrow (2012–2013); Liberal (2013–2018)
- Education: Hokkaido University

Ryo Shuhama (主浜 了, Shuhama Ryō; born 2 April 1950) is a Japanese politician of the Democratic Party of Japan, a member of the House of Councillors in the Diet (national legislature).

== Early life ==
Shuhama is a native of Takizawa, Iwate and a graduate of Hokkaido University. He worked at the government of Iwate Prefecture from 1973 until 2003.

== Political career ==
Shuhama was elected to the House of Councillors for the first time in 2004.

After approximately 12 years in office, Shuhama cited the need to care for a seriously ill family member when he announced in April 2016 that he would not seek a third term at the July 2016 House of Councillors election.

House of Councillors
Preceded by Motoo Shiina	Councillor for Iwate (Class of 1950/1956/...); 2004–present	Incumbent
