= Aichi 6th district =

Legislative district in Japan

Aichi 6th District
- Parliamentary constituency for the Japanese House of Representatives

- Numbered map of Aichi Prefecture single-member districts
- Prefecture: Aichi
- Proportional District: Tōkai
- Electorate: 359,295 (2022)

Current constituency
- Created: 1994
- Seats: One
- Party: Liberal Democratic Party
- Representative: Hideki Niwa

Aichi 6th district (愛知県第6区 Aichi-ken dai-roku or simply 愛知6区 Aichi rokku) is a constituency of the House of Representatives in the Diet of Japan (national legislature). It is located in Aichi and consists of the cities of Seto and Kasugai. The cities are just north of Nagoya and a part of the Chūkyō Metropolitan Area. Before the 2022 redistricting, the 6th consisted of Kasugai, Inuyama and Komaki. As of 2012, 420,807 eligible voters were registered in the district.

Before the electoral reform of 1994, the area formed part of Aichi 2nd district where four Representatives had been elected by single non-transferable vote.

The seat representing Aichi 6th had fallen vacant in early 2011 when representative Yoshihiro Ishida (DPJ) resigned for his unsuccessful campaign in the 2011 mayoral election in Nagoya, part of the "triple vote" (triple tōhyō) in Nagoya and Aichi on February 6, 2011 when elections for governor of Aichi, mayor of Nagoya and a recall referendum for the Nagoya city council took place. The by-election to replace Ishida took place on April 24, 2011, the day of the second round of the 2011 unified regional elections when mayors and councils in hundreds of cities, special wards, towns and villages across Japan are elected. The campaign officially took off on April 12, 2011: The Democratic Party did not nominate a candidate, Nagoya mayor Takashi Kawamura's party Genzei Nippon ("Tax cuts Japan") that won 13 seats in the Aichi assembly election on April 10 nominated journalist Masayo Kawamura; former representative Hideki Niwa ran for the LDP and won the by-election. In the general House of Representatives election of 2012, Niwa easily defended the seat against former prefectural assemblyman Masaki Amano and former Democrat Tomohiko Mizuno who had represented the Minami-Kantō PR block since 2009.

== List of representatives ==
Representative	Party	Dates	Notes
Shōzō Kusakawa	NFP	1996 – 2000	Not on the Tōkai PR list in 2000
Yukichi Maeda	DPJ	2000 – 2005	Reelected in the Tōkai PR block
Hideki Niwa	LDP	2005 – 2009	Failed reelection in the Tōkai PR block
Yoshihiro Ishida	DPJ	2009 – 2011	Resigned for the 2011 Nagoya mayoral election
Hideki Niwa	LDP	2011–	Incumbent

== Election results ==
2026
Party	Candidate	Votes	%	±%
LDP	Hideki Niwa	109,044	54.1	▲2.3
Centrist Reform	Nobue Kunizaki	39,828	19.7	
Sanseitō	Mai Kasuga	28,651	14.2	
Genzei–Yukoku	Ben Hashimoto	13,179	6.5	
Social Democratic	Masato Oonishi	10,996	5.5	▼9.6
Registered electors		352,828		
Turnout			58.31	▲5.59
LDP hold				

2024
Party	Candidate	Votes	%	±%
Liberal Democratic (endorsed by Komeito)	Hideki Niwa	92,083	51.74	▼6.61
Independent	Yukichi Maeda	32,608	18.32	
Social Democratic	Masato Oonishi	26,854	15.09	
Communist	Manabu Harada	26,425	14.85	
Majority		59,475	33.42	▲8.03
Registered electors		355,077		
Turnout		177,970	52.72	▼2.11
LDP hold				

2021
Party	Candidate	Votes	%	±%
LDP	Hideki Niwa	136,168	58.3	▲7.5
CDP	Isao Matsuda	76,912	33.0	
JCP	Ken Uchida	20,299	8,7	▼1.7
Turnout			54.83	▲1.63
LDP hold				

2017
Party	Candidate	Votes	%	±%
LDP	Hideki Niwa	114,894	50.8	▼1.2
Kibō no Tō	Kazuyoshi Morimoto	75,069	33.2	
JCP	Mitsunori Tagami	23,499	10.4	▼5.5
Social Democratic	Ryōhei Hirayama	12,764	5.5	
Turnout			53.20	▲2.92
LDP hold				

2014
Party	Candidate	Votes	%	±%
LDP	Hideki Niwa	106,887	52.0	▲2.9
Democratic	Kazuyoshi Morimoto	66,037	32.1	▲7.7
JCP	Kesami Yanagisawa	32,607	15.9	▲5.5
Turnout			50.28	▼7.09
LDP hold				

2012
Party	Candidate	Votes	%	±%
LDP (NK)	Hideki Niwa	113,991	49.1	
DPJ (PNP)	Masaki Amano	56,644	24.4	
TPJ (NPD)	Tomohiko Mizuno	37,200	16.0	
JCP	Kesami Yanagisawa	24,203	10.4	

By-election, April 24, 2011
Party	Candidate	Votes	%	±%
LDP	Hideki Niwa	104,328	61.4	
Genzei Nippon	Masayo Kawamura	39,308	23.2	
JCP	Akemi Kawae	14,369	8.5	
HRP	Mayumi Fukuhara	7,932	4.7	
Independent	Fumio Mekata	3,842	2.3	

2009
Party	Candidate	Votes	%	±%
DPJ (PNP support)	Yoshihiro Ishida	167,697		
LDP (Kōmeitō support)	Hideki Niwa	102,252		
Independent	Kōji Hasegawa	6,736		
HRP	Mayumi Fukuhara	5,970		
Independent	Hiroyuki Inagaki	2,243		
Turnout		291,296	69.87	

2005
Party	Candidate	Votes	%	±%
LDP	Hideki Niwa	126,670		
DPJ	Yukichi Maeda (elected in Tōkai PR block)	113,467		
JCP	Kesami Yanagisawa	23,576		
Turnout		269,095	66.01	

2003
Party	Candidate	Votes	%	±%
DPJ	Yukichi Maeda	97,776		
LDP	Hideki Niwa	80,700		
NCP	Jun Misawa	22,131		
JCP	Kesami Yanagisawa	20,524		
Turnout		226,638	56.26	

2000
Party	Candidate	Votes	%	±%
DPJ	Yukichi Maeda	97,714		
Kōmeitō	Shōzō Kusakawa	92,321		
JCP	Kazuyuki Tsuji	29,491		
Mushozoku no Kai	Ken'ichi Itō	22,617		
LL	Reiko Yasuda	6,971		
Independent	Masao Henmi	1,630		

1996
Party	Candidate	Votes	%	±%
NFP	Shōzō Kusakawa	90,812		
LDP	Katsundo Itō	59,631		
DPJ	Yū Amioka	49,074		
JCP	Masumi Watanabe	25,815		
Kokumintō	Isamu Harada	1,107		
Bunka Forum	Yōko Muramatsu	966		
Independent	Kimio Kasahara	776		
Taiheikai	Shin'ichi Masuda	450		
Turnout		235,156	54.19	
