= Hideki Niwa =

Japanese politician (born 1972)

- 丹羽 秀樹
- Official portrait, 2021

Member of the House of Representatives
- Incumbent
- Assumed office 24 April 2011
- Preceded by: Yoshihiro Ishida
- Constituency: Aichi 6th
- In office 11 September 2005 – 21 July 2009
- Preceded by: Yukichi Maeda
- Succeeded by: Yoshihiro Ishida
- Constituency: Aichi 6th

Personal details
- Born: 20 December 1972 (age 53) Kasugai, Aichi, Japan
- Party: Liberal Democratic
- Education: Tamagawa University
- Website: 2wa.jp//

Hideki Niwa (丹羽 秀樹, Niwa Hideki; born 20 December 1972) is a Japanese politician of the Liberal Democratic Party (LDP), who serves as a member of the House of Representatives in the Diet (national legislature). A native of Kasugai, Aichi and graduate of Tamagawa University, he was elected for the first time in 2005 after an unsuccessful run in 2003. He was defeated in the 2009 election by DPJ candidate Yoshihiro Ishida but regained his seat in special elections in 2011.
