= Eiji Kidoguchi =

- 木戸口 英司
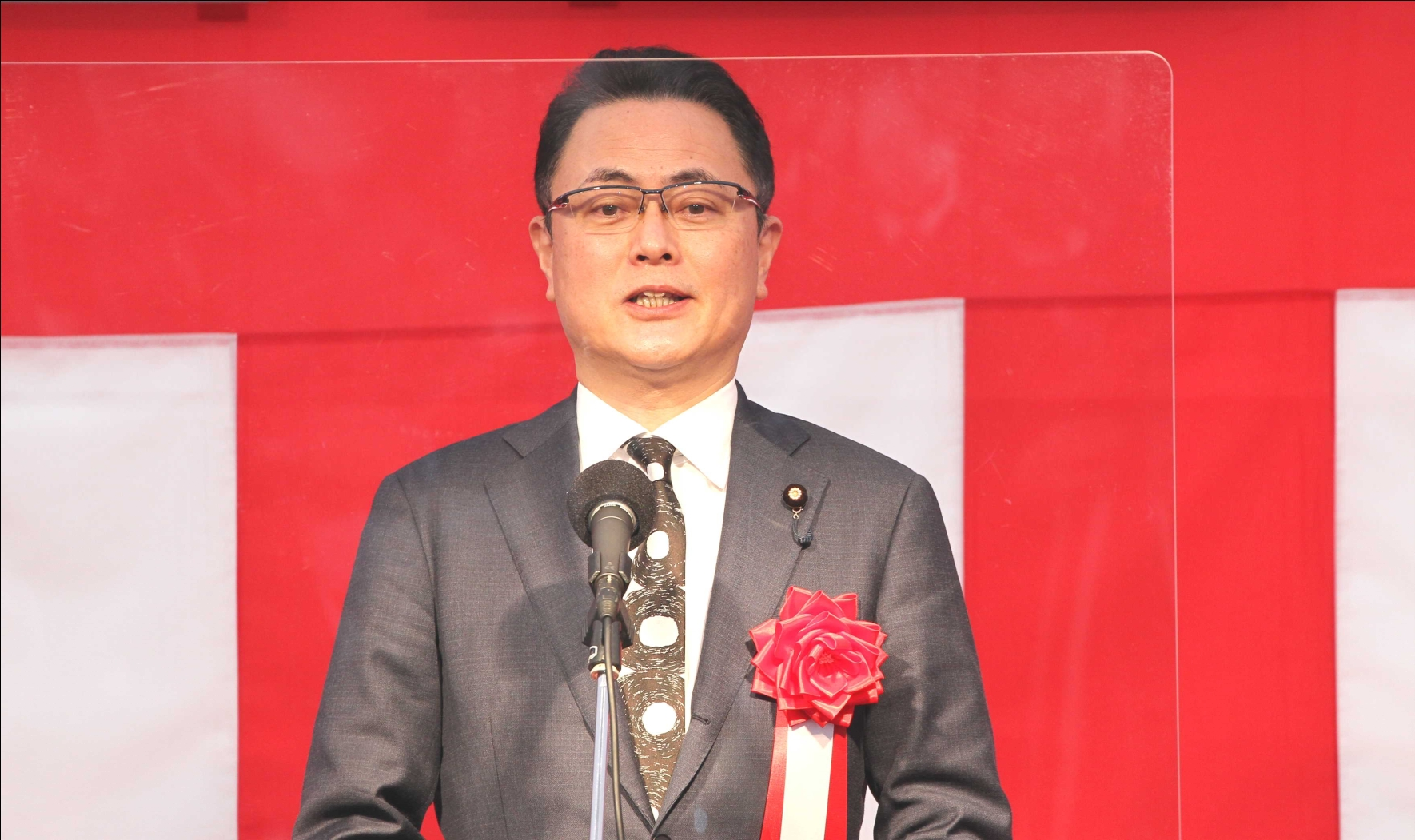
- Kidoguchi in 2020

Member of the House of Councillors
- Incumbent
- Assumed office 30 October 2024
- Preceded by: Megumi Hirose
- Constituency: Iwate at-large
- In office 26 July 2016 – 25 July 2022
- Preceded by: Ryo Shuhama
- Succeeded by: Megumi Hirose
- Constituency: Iwate at-large

Member of the Iwate Prefectural Assembly
- In office 2003–2007
- Constituency: Hanamaki City

Personal details
- Born: 21 August 1963 (age 63) Hanamaki, Iwate, Japan
- Party: CDP (since 2020)
- Other political affiliations: LP (2003); DPJ (2003–2016); Independent (2016); PLP (2016–2019); DPP (2019–2020)
- Education: Chiba University

Eiji Kidoguchi is a Japanese politician who is a member of the House of Councillors of Japan, serving for the Iwate at-large district as a member of the Constitutional Democratic Party of Japan. Kidoguchi was first elected in 2016, but lost the seat in 2022. Kidoguchi won the seat back in by-election in 2024 after the resignation of the incumbent, Megumi Hirose.
