= Yukichi Maeda =

Japanese politician

- 前田 雄吉

Member of the House of Representatives
- In office 25 June 2000 – 21 July 2009
- Preceded by: Shōzō Kusakawa
- Succeeded by: Multi-member district
- Constituency: Aichi 6th (2000–2005); Tōkai PR (2005–2009)

Personal details
- Born: 8 January 1960 (age 66) Aichi Prefecture, Japan
- Party: Independent
- Other political affiliations: JNP (1992–1994); NFP (1994–1998); DPJ (1998–2008; 2010–2012); Genzei Nippon (2012); TCJ (2012); TPJ (2012–2013)
- Education: Keio University

Yukichi Maeda (前田 雄吉, Maeda Yūkichi; born 8 January 1960) is a former Japanese politician, who served as a member of the House of Representatives in the Diet (national legislature). A native of Nishikasugai District, Aichi and graduate of Keio University, he was elected to the House of Representatives for the first time in 2000 as a Democrat.
