= Reconstruction Agency =

Japanese government agency

- 復興庁; Fukkō-chō

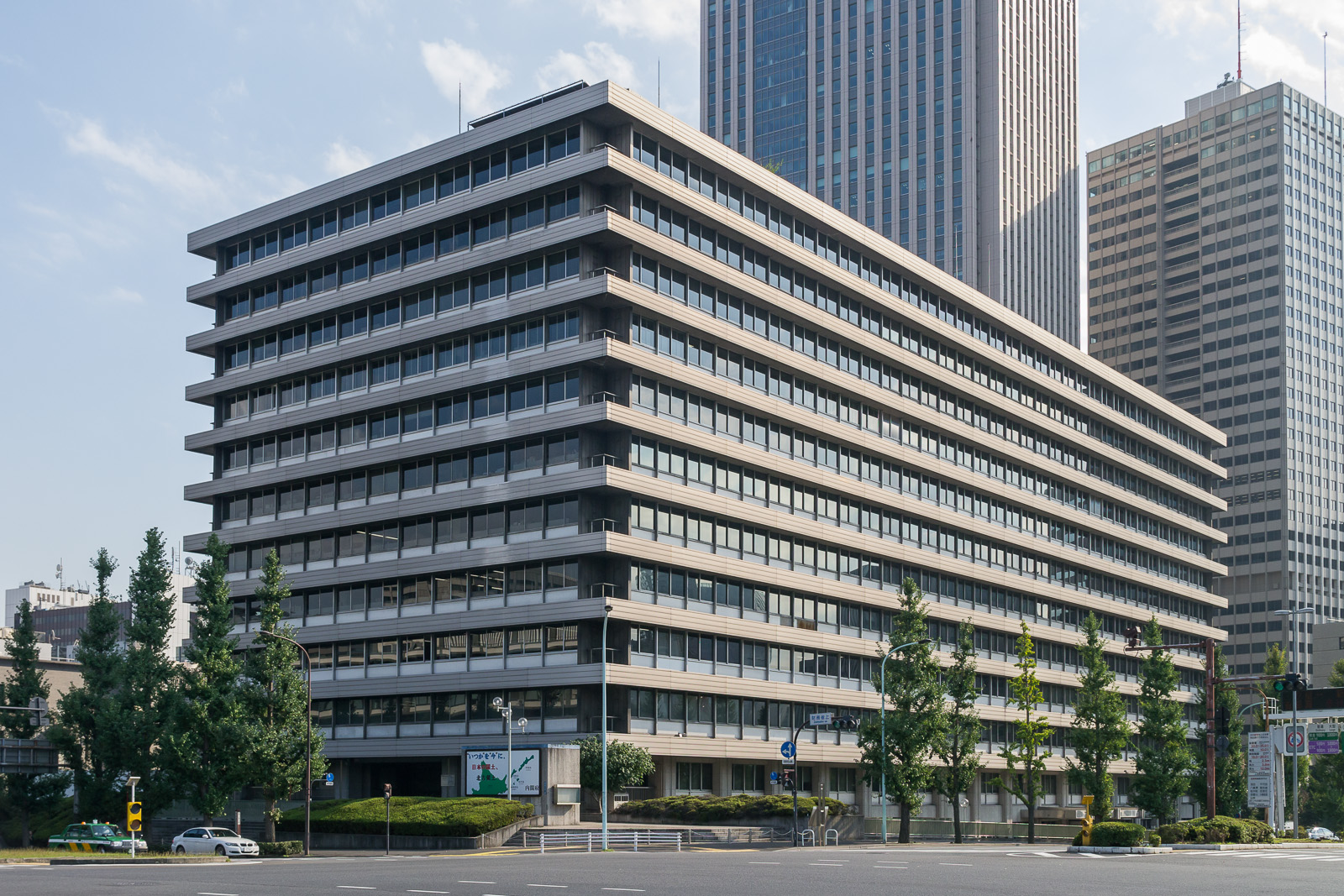
- Central Government Building No. 4, where the Tokyo Headquarters of the Reconstruction Agency is located

Agency overview
- Formed: February 10, 2012
- Preceding agency: Reconstruction Headquarters in response to the Great East Japan Earthquake
- Jurisdiction: Government of Japan
- Headquarters: Central Government Building No. 4, 1-1 Kasumigaseki 3-chome, Chiyoda-ku, Tokyo 100-0013, Japan; 35°40′23.3″N 139°44′52.8″E
- Employees: 202 (full-time), 215 (part-time)
- Annual budget: ¥2.433 trillion
- Minister responsible: Goshi Hosono, Minister for Reconstruction and Minister in charge of Comprehensive Policy Coordination for Revival from the Nuclear Accident at Fukushima
- Deputy Ministers responsible: Yoshitami Kameoka, State Minister for Reconstruction; Hiroyuki Togashi, State Minister for Reconstruction; Takeyuki Watanabe, State Minister for Reconstruction
- Website: www.reconstruction.go.jp/english/

The Reconstruction Agency (復興庁, Fukkō-chō) is an agency of the Japanese government established on February 10, 2012, to coordinate reconstruction activities related to the 2011 Tōhoku earthquake and tsunami and Fukushima Daiichi nuclear disaster.

== Mission ==
According to "Role of the Reconstruction Agency", the agency will:

1. Plan, coordinate, and implement the national policy on reconstruction;
2. Bear the responsibility for a unified point of contact, assistance, etc. to local public bodies.

== History and function ==
The Reconstruction Agency was established to replace the Reconstruction Headquarters in response to the Great East Japan earthquake, created on June 24, 2011. The Reconstruction Agency was headed by the Prime Minister Yoshihiko Noda. Noda was named direct head of the agency in an effort to strengthen the leadership of the organization. Tatsuo Hirano, a native of Iwate Prefecture, served as the agency's first Minister of State for Disaster Management until he was replaced by Osamu Fujimura on June 4, 2012. The Reconstruction Agency is not part of the Cabinet Office, but will have authority over other government ministries. The agency was originally planned to exist for ten years, the length of time estimated to fully restore the region after the disaster, and then be dissolved on March 3, 2021. However, per a Cabinet decision on December 20, 2019, the agency's term was extended until FY 2030 (approximately 9 years beyond its original expiry). The decision also scheduled a review of the agency in FY 2025. A wooden tablet for the new agency was made from materials from the earthquake zone. Prime Minister Noda placed the tablet at the Akasaka Agency headquarters as a reminder of the responsibility to residents of the disaster-hit regions.

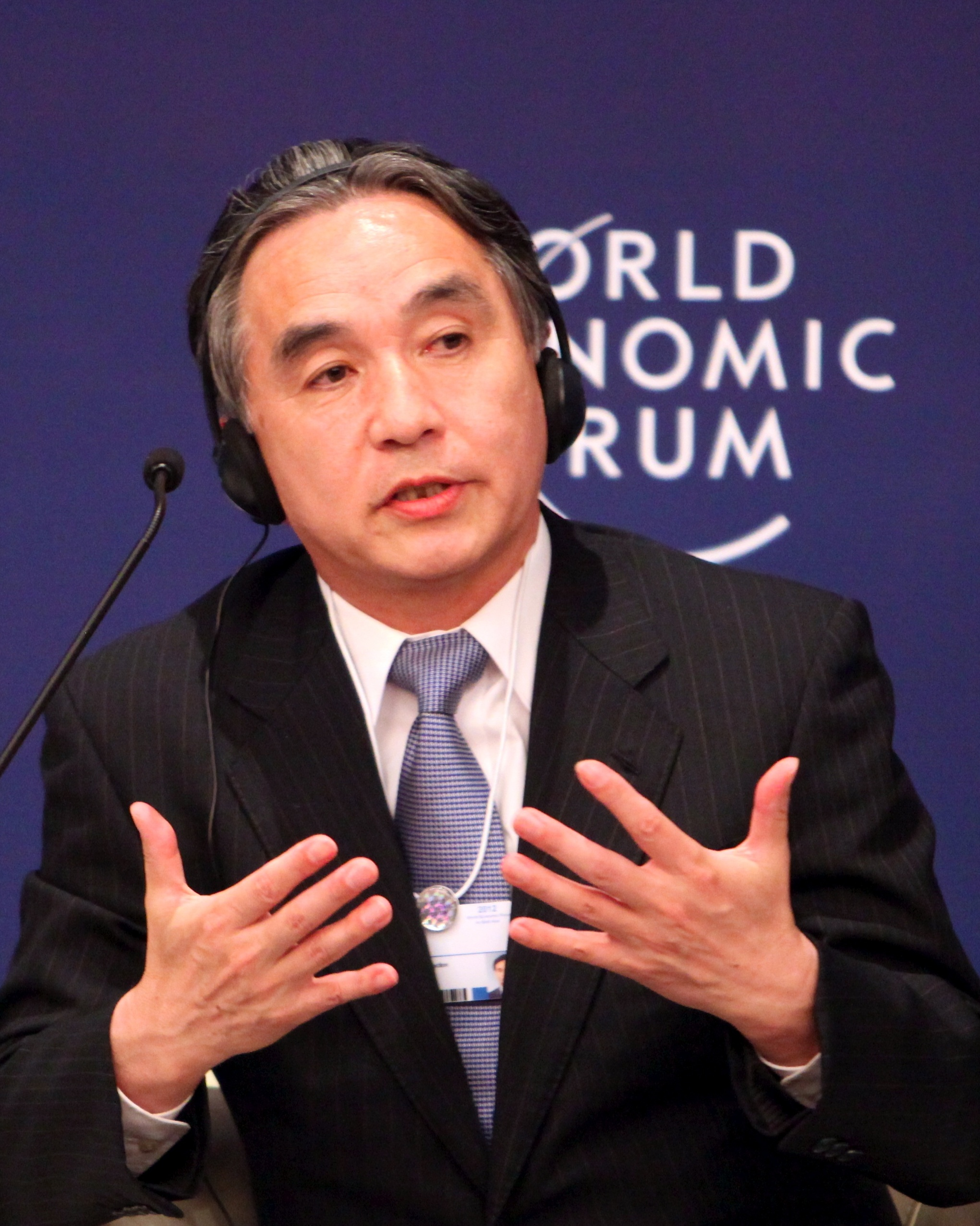
Tatsuo Hirano, former Minister of State for Disaster Management, at the World Economic Forum on East Asia 2012

The Reconstruction Agency established three Regional Offices for Reconstruction in Iwate, Miyagi, and Fukushima prefectures, and two smaller regional offices in Hachinohe, Aomori Prefecture and Mito, Ibaraki Prefecture. The agency also sought to work with business associations in Japan in order to establish or revive economic activity in the Tohoku region affected by the earthquake, tsunami, and nuclear disaster. The agency, as well as the Japan Business Federation, the Japan Association of Corporate Executives, the Japan Chamber of Commerce and Industry, and their affiliated corporations, formed the Reconstruction Design Council in response to the Great East Japan earthquake.

== Timeline ==
- 2011
  - March 11 — Tōhoku earthquake and tsunami
  - June 24 — Basic Act on Reconstruction in response to the Great East Japan earthquake (東日本大震災復興基本法, Higashi Nihon Daishinsai Fukkō Kihonhō) (Law No. 76 of 2011) passed in the Diet of Japan
  - June 24 — Reconstruction Headquarters in response to the Great East Japan earthquake created
  - September 2 — Resignation of Prime Minister Naoto Kan, Prime Minister Yoshihiko Noda assumes office
  - December 9 — Law to Establish the Reconstruction Agency (復興庁設置法, Fukkō-chō Setchihō) (Law No. 125 of 2011) passed in the Diet of Japan
- 2012
  - February 10 — Opening of Reconstruction Agency
  - June 4 — Osamu Fujimura became the agency's second Minister of State for Disaster Management

== Structure ==
Reconstruction Agency (復興庁, Fukkō-chō) (Minato-ku, Tokyo)

- Iwate Response Office (岩手復興局, Iwate Fukkōkyoku) (Morioka, Iwate Prefecture)
  - Miyako Branch Office (宮古支所, Miyako Shisho) (Miyako, Iwate Prefecture)
  - Kamaishi Branch Office (釜石支所, Kamaishi Shisho) (Kamaishi, Iwate Prefecture)
- Miyagi Response Office (宮城復興局, Miyagi Fukkōkyoku) (Sendai, Miyagi Prefecture)
  - Kesennuma Branch Office (気仙沼支所, Kesennuma Shisho) (Kesennuma, Miyagi Prefecture)
  - Ishinomaki Branch Office (石巻支所, Ishinomaki Shisho) (Ishinomaki, Miyagi Prefecture)
- Fukushima Response Office (福島復興局, Fukushima Fukkōkyoku) (Fukushima, Fukushima Prefecture)
  - Minami-Sōma Branch Office (南相馬支所, Minamisōma Shisho) (Minamisōma, Fukushima Prefecture)
  - Iwaki Branch Office (いわき支所, Iwaki Shisho) (Iwaki, Fukushima Prefecture)
- Aomori Office (青森事務所, Aomori Jimusho) (Hachinohe, Aomori Prefecture)
- Ibaraki Office (茨城事務所, Ibaraki Jimusho) (Mito, Ibaraki Prefecture)
- Reconstruction Design Council in response to the Great East Japan earthquake (復興推進会議, Fukkō Suishin Kaigi)
- Study Group of the Reconstruction Design Council in Response to the Great East Japan earthquake (復興推進委員会, Fukkō Suishin Iinkai)

== Criticism ==
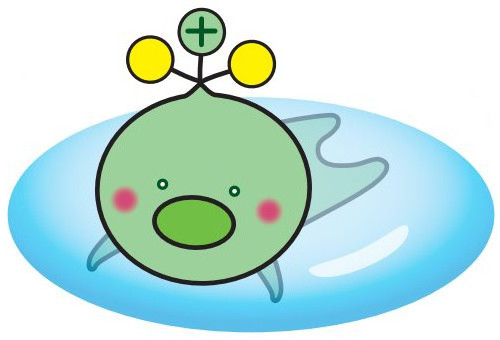
A character representing tritium, a radioisotope of hydrogen, appeared in an online flyer and video on the agency’s website on April 13, 2021, and was removed on the next day following criticism.

The establishment of the Reconstruction Agency received criticism for both the slow pace of its establishment, and for the location of its headquarters. Residents and officials in regions affected by the disaster, notably Yūhei Satō, governor of Fukushima Prefecture, publicly noted the lack of speed in which the agency was created:

From the victims' perspective, I can't help but ask, 'Couldn't they have launched the agency more quickly?'

— Yūhei Satō, CNN, March 1, 2012

Legislation in the National Diet to establish the agency was slowed by the resignation of Prime Minister Naoto Kan in September 2011. The bill to create the agency passed in December 2011, nine months after the disaster occurred, delaying the opening of the agency until February 2012. Kan acknowledged the slow pace of government response to the disaster on March 3, 2011, and pledged to speed up recovery efforts. Residents displaced by the tsunami have opposed Agency-led plans to rebuild towns on higher land away from the coast, and see it as a disconnect between the central government and the population in the Tōhoku region. After a strict review of initial projects, the Agency approved a large number of projects in a second round of reviews in May 2012, including funds for urban and agricultural renewal.

== Ministers ==
- Tatsuo Hirano (1st: February 10, 2012 – December 26, 2012)
- Takumi Nemoto (2nd: December 26, 2012 – September 3, 2014)
- Wataru Takeshita (3rd: September 3, 2014 – October 7, 2015)
- Tsuyoshi Takagi (4th: October 7, 2015 – August 3, 2016)
- Masahiro Imamura (5th: August 3, 2016 – April 26, 2017)
- Masayoshi Yoshino (6th: April 26, 2017 – October 2, 2018)
- Hiromichi Watanabe (7th: October 2, 2018 – September 11, 2019)
- Kazunori Tanaka (8th: September 11, 2019 – September 16, 2020)
- Katsuei Hirasawa (9th: September 16, 2020 – October 4, 2021)
- Kosaburo Nishime (10th: October 4, 2021 – August 10, 2022)
- Kenya Akiba (11th: August 10 – December 27, 2022)
- Hiromichi Watanabe (12th: December 27, 2022 – September 13, 2023)
- Shinako Tsuchiya (13th: September 13, 2023 – October 1, 2024)
- Tadahiko Ito (14th: October 1, 2024 – October 21, 2025)
- Takao Makino (15th: October 21, 2025 – September 17, 2026)
- Goshi Hosono (16th: September 17, 2026)

=== Deputy Ministers ===
- Hiroyuki Togashi (2022)
- Hideki Niizuma (2022)
- Takeyuki Watanabe (2022)

== See also ==
- 2011 Tōhoku earthquake and tsunami
- Fukushima Daiichi nuclear disaster
- Prime Minister of Japan
- Naoto Kan
- Yoshihiko Noda
- Tatsuo Hirano
