= Megumi Hirose =

Japanese politician

- 広瀬 めぐみ
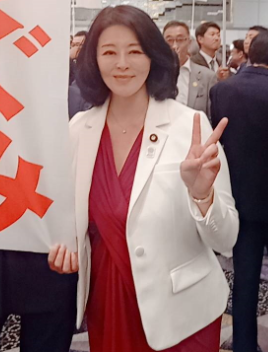
- Hirose in 2023

Member of the House of Councillors
- In office 26 July 2022 – 15 August 2024
- Preceded by: Eiji Kidoguchi
- Succeeded by: Eiji Kidoguchi
- Constituency: Iwate at-large

Personal details
- Born: 27 June 1966 (age 60) Morioka, Iwate, Japan
- Party: Liberal Democratic (Shikōkai)
- Education: Sophia University
- Occupation: Politician, lawyer

Megumi Hirose (広瀬 めぐみ, Hirose Megumi; born June 27, 1966) is a Japanese politician and lawyer who served in the House of Councillors for Iwate Prefecture from 2022 to 2024. She is a member of the Liberal Democratic Party. She is the first LDP member to represent Iwate as a councilor since Motoo Shiina left the party in 1993.

== Early life and education ==
Hirose was born in Morioka in Iwate, to a family that ran the Hotel Odashima, the oldest in the Morioka area. Her father died of an illness when she was eleven, leaving her to grow up in a single-parent household. She graduated from the Iwate University Faculty of Education Junior High School, the Morioka First High School, and Sophia University Department of English.

Her spouse is a lawyer and a former classmate, and she aspired to become a lawyer after being a housewife for a few years. She passed the bar examination in 1999, and registered as a lawyer in 2001.

== Political career ==
In 2012, she gave a speech to the United Nations General Assembly on the "Status and situation of women in Japan". On November 27, in 2021, the Liberal Democratic Party Iwate Prefecture Union announced that it would endorse Hirose to contest the 2022 Councillors election in Iwate.

She was elected in 2022, defeating incumbent Councillor Eiji Kidoguchi and three other minor party candidates by a margin of around 20k votes. She became the first female Councillor from Iwate. The election signaled a defeat for Ichirō Ozawa, who originated from the prefecture. She joined the Shikōkai faction in 2023.

== Political positions ==
She is on the right wing of the party, and strictly opposes same-sex marriage. She supports modifying Article 9 of the Japanese Constitution to give more strength to the military, and believes that South Korea must give up more concessions when it comes to negotiations over the existence of comfort women. She also supports increasing the use of nuclear power.

== Controversies ==
=== Relationship with Unification Church ===
In May 2022, she is said to have visited a church in Morioka City at the invitation of supporters of the former Unification Church and greeted the person in charge. Regarding the matter, the executive director of Hirose's office said, "We had no idea that this was an organization with problems such as inspirational marketing and donations."

=== Affair report ===
On the night of October 30, 2023, Hirose went with Canadian saxophonist Andy Wulf from a restaurant in Shibuya to a love hotel in Kabukichō, and checked out the next morning. This was reported on in the seventh issue of the Shukan Shincho.

In a direct interview on February 20, 2024, Hirose was asked if she had entered the love hotel. She responded, saying that "Well, I guess so. The photo was taken, so it can't be helped."

Her website released a statement on the 29 February. "There have been reports about my relationship. I have lost the trust of the people who support me, caused inconvenience, and I am sorry to have betrayed the trust of my family. I sincerely apologize for what I caused[.]"

== Resignation ==
In July 2024, authorities searched Hirose's residence and office after she admitted fraudulently paying salaries to a secretary who performed no duties. She subsequently resigned from the House of Councillors on August 15. A by-election to replace her was held together with the 2024 Japanese general election to the House of Representatives. In March 2025, Hirose was convicted and sentenced to a suspended 2.5 year prison term for defrauding 3.5 million yen ($23,000) over the charges.
