= Ken Saitō =

Japanese politician

- 齋藤 健
- Official portrait, 2023

Minister of Economy, Trade and Industry
- In office 14 December 2023 – 1 October 2024
- Prime Minister: Fumio Kishida
- Preceded by: Yasutoshi Nishimura
- Succeeded by: Yoji Muto

Minister of Justice
- In office 11 November 2022 – 13 September 2023
- Prime Minister: Fumio Kishida
- Preceded by: Yasuhiro Hanashi
- Succeeded by: Ryuji Koizumi

Minister of Agriculture, Forestry and Fisheries
- In office 3 August 2017 – 2 October 2018
- Prime Minister: Shinzo Abe
- Preceded by: Yūji Yamamoto
- Succeeded by: Takamori Yoshikawa

Member of the House of Representatives; from Southern Kanto
- Incumbent
- Assumed office 31 August 2009
- Preceded by: Multi-member district
- Constituency: PR block (2009–2012); Chiba 7th (2012–present)

Personal details
- Born: 齋藤 健 (Saitō Ken); 14 June 1959 (age 67) Shinjuku, Tokyo, Japan
- Party: Liberal Democratic
- Education: University of Tokyo; Harvard University (MPA)

Ken Saitō (齋藤 健, Saitō Ken; born 14 June 1959) is a member of the Liberal Democratic Party who served as the Minister of Economy, Trade and Industry from December 2023 to October 2024. Also serving in the Japanese House of Representatives, Saito served as the Minister of Justice from November 2022 to September 2023 and was the Minister of Agriculture, Forestry and Fisheries from August 2017 to October 2018.

== Early life and background ==
Born in Shinjuku, Tokyo, his family ran a photography business. He attended Senior High School at Komaba, University of Tsukuba, and graduated from the Faculty of Economics at the University of Tokyo. In April 1983, he joined the Ministry of International Trade and Industry (now the Ministry of Economy, Trade and Industry) and was assigned to the Petroleum Distribution Division of the Agency for Natural Resources and Energy. He studied at Harvard University's Kennedy School and obtained a master's degree in 1991. In 1994, he played a central role in Japan-U.S. automobile negotiations. After serving as the Personnel Planning Officer in the Minister's Secretariat, he became the secretary to Minister of International Trade and Industry Takashi Fukaya in 1999. He later served as the Planning Officer at the Cabinet Office's Administrative Reform Promotion Office. In 2004, he was appointed as the Vice-Governor of Saitama Prefecture upon the invitation of Governor Kiyoshi Ueda.

=== Entry into Politics ===
In 2006, he applied for the Liberal Democratic Party's open recruitment for a by-election in Chiba's 7th district for the House of Representatives. He was selected from among 221 candidates and ran with the party's official endorsement. During the by-election, the campaign slogan "Saisho wa guu! Saito Ken!" delivered by LDP Secretary General Tsutomu Takebe and others gained significant attention, but Saito was defeated by a narrow margin of 955 votes by Kazumi Ota of the Democratic Party of Japan. Saito was elected to the House of Representatives for the first time in the 2009 election.

== Diet member and minister ==
Saito was a member of the Ishiba faction, led by Shigeru Ishiba, who was critical of the Abe administration. He served as minister of agriculture in the Abe Cabinet from August 2017 to October 2018. In this position, he continued to keep a tariff on foreign beef.

Saito entered the Kishida Cabinet as minister of justice in November 2022, after the former minister resigned due to a gaffe. Saito was at the forefront of advancing a revised immigration law, which sought to overhaul the asylum process. The revision was opposed by the CDP, which submitted a censure motion against Saito on 6 June 2023 in order to delay it. The motion of censure was rejected and the revision passed. Saito left cabinet in September 2023 due to a reshuffle.

After two months he returned to cabinet as industry minister, after the previous minister resigned. Saito oversaw the expansion of Japan's semiconductor industry, through government subsidies to companies.

In August 2024, after Prime Minister Fumio Kishida expressed his intention not to seek another term an LDP presidential election, Saito expressed interest in running for the presidency. He received support from Yuko Obuchi and Yoshihisa Furukawa. He withdrew on 11 September, having been unable to gather the twenty diet members necessary to be nominated.

Saito was appointed to chairman of the Budget Committee in the House of Representatives in October 2026.

Political offices
Preceded by Yūji Yamamoto	Minister of Agriculture, Forestry and Fisheries; 2017–2018	Succeeded by Takamori Yoshikawa
Preceded by Yasuhiro Hanashi	Minister of Justice; 2022–2023	Succeeded by Ryuji Koizumi
Preceded by Yasutoshi Nishimura	Minister of Economy, Trade and Industry; 2023–2024	Succeeded by Yoji Muto
House of Representatives (Japan)
Preceded by Tetsushi Sakamoto	Chairman of the Committee on the Budget; 2026–present	Incumbent
