= Iwate at-large district =

Japan House of Councillors constituency

- 岩手県選挙区
- Parliamentary constituency for the House of Councillors
- Prefecture: Iwate
- Electorate: 1,017,716 (as of September 2022)

Current constituency
- Created: 1947
- Seats: 2
- Councillors: Class of 2028: Eiji Kidoguchi (CDP); Class of 2031: Takanori Yokozawa (CDP)

The Iwate at-large district (岩手県選挙区, Iwate-ken senkyo-ku) is a constituency of the House of Councillors in the Diet of Japan. It consists of Iwate Prefecture and elects two Councillors, one every three years, making it one of the decisive single-member districts. Ichirō Ozawa came from the prefecture, and as a result, it is much more markedly competitive than many other rural, 2 seat districts. It was represented by two opposition members until 2022, when Hirose defeated CDP Councilor Eiji Kidoguchi to return it to split control. Kidoguchi defeated other opposition parties to win it back in a 2024 by-election following Hirose's resignation, returning the district to representation by opposition members. It is also one of the districts where the opposition have been most consolidated; the last time multiple major party opposition members ran was 2013. The last LDP member to represent the district before Hirose was Motoo Shiina, who left the party in 1998.

== Elected Councillors ==
Class of 1947 (1947: 6-year term)	Election year	Class of 1950 (1947: 3-year term)
Katsuji Debuchi † 1947 (Ind.) (Note: joined Ryokufūkai)	1947	Tadashi Chida (Ind.)
Matsusuke Kawamura (JLP)	1947 by-el.	Tadashi Chida (Ind.)
Matsusuke Kawamura (JLP)	1950	Tadashi Chida (Ind.)
Matsusuke Kawamura (Yoshida faction LP)	1953	Tadashi Chida (Ind.)
Matsusuke Kawamura (Yoshida faction LP)	1956	Tadashi Chida (Ind.)
Teiji Yamura † 1968 (LDP)	1959	Tadashi Chida (Ind.)
Teiji Yamura † 1968 (LDP)	1962	Kankichi Watanabe (JSP)
Teiji Yamura † 1968 (LDP)	1965	Kankichi Watanabe (JSP)
Michiyuki Isurugi † 1987 (LDP)	1968 by-el.	Kankichi Watanabe (JSP)
Michiyuki Isurugi † 1987 (LDP)	1968	Sakari Masuda (LDP)
Michiyuki Isurugi † 1987 (LDP)	1971	Sakari Masuda (LDP)
Michiyuki Isurugi † 1987 (LDP)	1974	Sakari Masuda (LDP)
Michiyuki Isurugi † 1987 (LDP)	1977	Sakari Masuda (LDP)
Michiyuki Isurugi † 1987 (LDP)	1980	Sakari Masuda (LDP)
Michiyuki Isurugi † 1987 (LDP)	1983	Sakari Masuda (LDP)
Michiyuki Isurugi † 1987 (LDP)	1986	Kiyotaka Takahashi (LDP)
Jin'ichi Ogawa (JSP)	1987 by-el.	Kiyotaka Takahashi (LDP)
Jin'ichi Ogawa (JSP)	1989	Kiyotaka Takahashi (LDP)
Jin'ichi Ogawa (JSP)	1992	Motoo Shiina (LDP) (Note: left LDP in 1993, later temporarily "Liberal Assembly")
Yoshinori Takahashi (NFP)	1995	Motoo Shiina (LDP)
Yoshinori Takahashi (NFP)	1998	Motoo Shiina (Ind.) (Note: joined "Independent Assembly")
Tatsuo Hirano (LP)	2001	Motoo Shiina (Ind.)
Tatsuo Hirano (LP)	2004	Ryō Shuhama (DPJ) (Note: joined LF→TPJ→PLP in 2012)
Tatsuo Hirano (DPJ) (Note: expelled in 2013)	2007	Ryō Shuhama (DPJ)
Tatsuo Hirano (DPJ)	2010	Ryō Shuhama (DPJ)
Tatsuo Hirano (Ind.)	2013	Ryō Shuhama (DPJ)
Tatsuo Hirano (Ind.)	2016	Eiji Kidoguchi (Ind.)
Takanori Yokosawa (Ind.) (Note: joined CDP in 2020)	2019	Eiji Kidoguchi (Ind.)
Takanori Yokosawa (Ind.)	2022	Megumi Hirose # (LDP)
Takanori Yokosawa (Ind.)	2024 by-el.	Eiji Kidoguchi (CDP)
Takanori Yokosawa (CDP)	2025	Eiji Kidoguchi (CDP)

Party affiliations as of election day; #: resigned; †: died in office.

== Recent election results ==
2025: Iwate at-large 1 seat
Party	Candidate	Votes	%	±%
CDP	Takanori Yokosawa	278,888	48.39	▲5.19
LDP	Tatsuo Hirano	178,958	31.05	▼16.12
Sanseitō	Taisuke Oikawa	106,806	18.53	▲13.72
Anti-NHK	Hironobu Yoshida	11,676	2.03	▼0.35
Turnout			59.10	▲
Registered electors		995,054		
Party total seats		Won	Total	Change
Constitutional Democratic		1	2	Steady

2024 by-election
Party	Candidate	Votes	%	±%
CDP	Eiji Kidoguchi	334,914	65.9	
Independent	Ayumi Tanaka	109,978	21.7	
Sanseitō	Toshiya Yoshida	48,214	9.5	▲4.7
Minor party	Hironori Matsushima	9,015	1.8	
Minor party	Yutaka Odata	5,810	1.1	
Registered electors		1,000,754		
Turnout			55.54	▲0.16
CDP gain from LDP				

2022
Party	Candidate	Votes	%	±%
LDP	Megumi Hirose	264,422	47.2	▲0.9
Independent	Eiji Kidoguchi	242,174	43.2	▼5.7
Sanseitō	Akishi Shiratori	26,960	4.8	New
Independent	Hiroko Ogoshi	13,637	2.4	
Anti-NHK	Takashi Matsuda	13,352	2.4	▼2.3
Registered electors		1,034,059		
Turnout			55,38%	▼1.17

2019
Party	Candidate	Votes	%	±%
Independent	Takanori Yokosawa	288,239	48.97	−
LDP	Tatsuo Hirano	272,733	46.33	▲6.63
Anti-NHK	Shuuichi Kajitani	27,658	4.7	
Registered electors		1,066,492		
Turnout			56,55%	▼1.23

2016
Party	Candidate	Votes	%	±%
Independent	Eiji Kidoguchi (Endorsed by Democratic, Communist, Social Democratic and People's Life parties)	328,555	53.3	
LDP	Shinichi Tanaka (Endorsed by Komeito)	252,767	41.0	
Happiness Realization	Mikiko Ishikawa	34,593	5.6	

2013
Party	Candidate	Votes	%	±%
Independent	Tatsuo Hirano (Incumbent)	243,368	39.7	
LDP	Shinichi Tanaka (Endorsed by Komeito)	161,499	26.4	
People's Life	Toshinobu Sekine Endorsed by Green Wind	91,048	14.9	
Democratic	Harumi Yoshida	62,047	10.1	
JCP	Yukio Kikuchi	46,529	7.6	
Happiness Realization	Keiko Takahashi	8,322	1.4	

2010
Party	Candidate	Votes	%	±%
Democratic	Ryō Shuhama (Incumbent)	351,545	54.2	
LDP	Yukifumi Takahashi	197,137	30.4	
Social Democratic	Masahiro Iwasa	54,989	8.5	
JCP	Sadakiyo Segawa	44,771	6.9	
Turnout		669,498	60.36	

2007
Party	Candidate	Votes	%	±%
Democratic	Tatsuo Hirano (Incumbent) (Supported by People's New Party)	437,814	62.6	
LDP	Shōichirō Chida (Supported by Kōmeitō)	176,096	25.2	
Social Democratic	Masahiro Iwasa	47,425	6.8	
JCP	Akio Wakayama	38,089	5.4	
Turnout		714,559	63.49	
