= Taku Nemoto =

Japanese politician (born 1986)

- 根本 拓
- Official portrait, 2026

Member of the House of Representatives
- Incumbent
- Assumed office 1 November 2024
- Constituency: Tohoku PR (2024–2026); Fukushima 2nd (2026–present)

Personal details
- Born: 11 September 1986 (age 40) Kōriyama, Fukushima, Japan
- Party: Liberal Democratic
- Parent: Takumi Nemoto (father)
- Education: University of Tokyo (BA); Harvard University (LLM)

Taku Nemoto (根本拓, Nemoto Taku; born 11 September 1986) is a Japanese politician serving as a member of the House of Representatives since 2024. He is the son of Takumi Nemoto.
