= Tatsuo Hirano =

Japanese politician

- 平野 達男
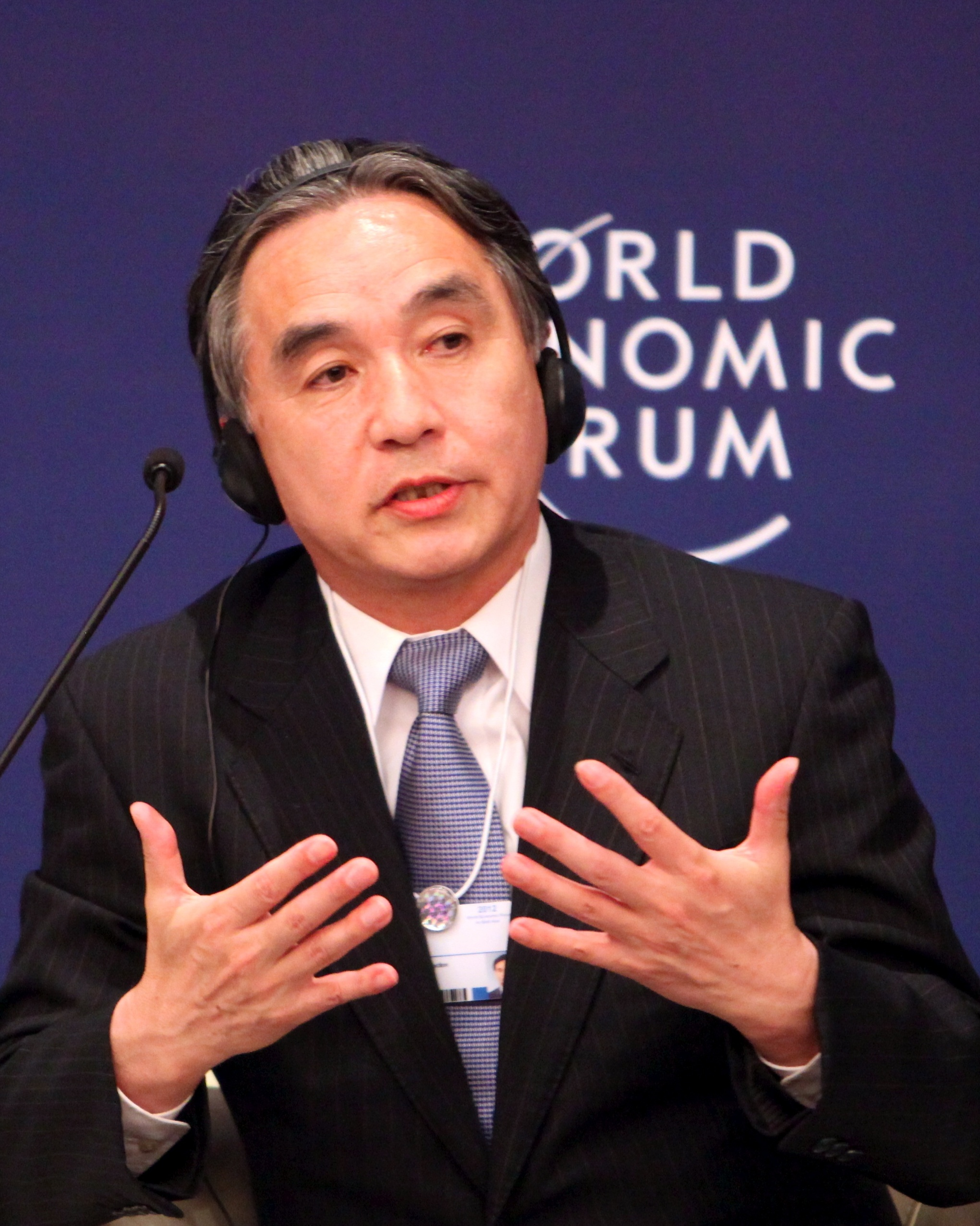
- Hirano in 2012

Minister for Reconstruction
- In office 10 February 2012 – 26 December 2012
- Prime Minister: Yoshihiko Noda
- Preceded by: Office established
- Succeeded by: Takumi Nemoto

Member of the House of Councillors
- In office 30 July 2001 – 28 July 2019
- Preceded by: Yoshinori Takahashi
- Succeeded by: Takanori Yokosawa
- Constituency: Iwate at-large

Personal details
- Born: 2 May 1954 (age 72) Kitakami, Iwate, Japan
- Party: LDP (since 2016)
- Other political affiliations: LP (2001–2003); DPJ (2003–2013); Independent (2013–2016)
- Education: University of Tokyo; Iowa State University

Tatsuo Hirano (平野 達男, Hirano Tatsuo; born May 2, 1954) is a retired Japanese politician of the Liberal Democratic Party, and was formerly a member of the Democratic Party of Japan. He was formerly a member of the House of Councillors in the Diet (national legislature).

== Early life ==
Hirano is a native of Kitakami, Iwate and graduated from the University of Tokyo. He joined the Ministry of Agriculture, Forestry and Fisheries in 1977, attending the Iowa State University in the United States as a ministry official.

== Political career ==
In 2001, he left the ministry and was elected to the House of Councillors for the first time.

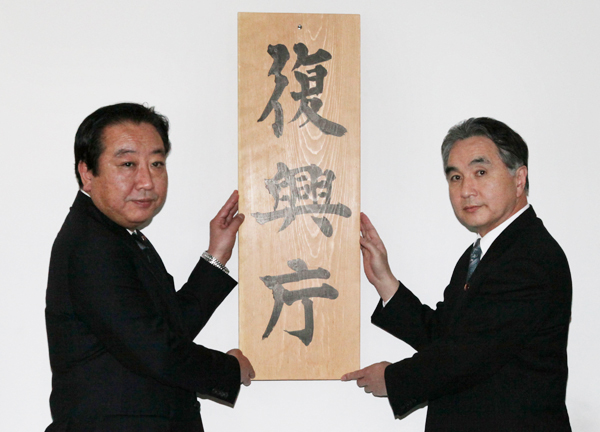
Hirano with Yoshihiko Noda in 2012

On July 5, 2011, after the abrupt resignation of Ryū Matsumoto, Hirano was named the Minister of State for Disaster Management, in the aftermath of the Great East Japan earthquake in his native Tōhoku region. He was reappointed to the post in September 2011 in the cabinet of newly appointed prime minister Yoshihiko Noda.

Political offices
Preceded by Atsushi Ōshima; Hideo Hiraoka; Kōhei Ōtsuka	Senior Vice Minister, Cabinet Office; 2010–2011; Served alongside: Shōzō Azuma, Yoshinori Suematsu	Succeeded by Shōzō Azuma; Yoshinori Suematsu; Tsuyoshi Yamaguchi
Preceded by Ryū Matsumoto	Minister of State for Disaster Management, Cabinet Office; 2011–2012	Succeeded by Masaharu Nakagawa
New creation	Minister for Reconstruction; 2012	Succeeded by Takumi Nemoto
House of Councillors
Preceded by Yoshinori Takahashi	Councillor for Iwate (Class of 1947/1953/...); 2001–2019	Succeeded by Takanori Yokosawa
