= Kota Hirado =

Japanese politician (born 1987)

- 平戸 航太

Member of the House of Councillors
- Incumbent
- Assumed office 29 July 2025
- Constituency: National PR

Personal details
- Born: 1 July 1987 (age 39) Iōjima, Nagasaki, Japan
- Party: DPP
- Education: Kyushu University

Kota Hirado (平戸航太, Hirado Kota; born 1 July 1987) is a Japanese politician serving as a member of the House of Councillors since 2025. In the 2024 general election, he was a candidate for the House of Representatives in Chiba 7th district.
