= Takumi Nemoto =

Japanese politician

- 根本 匠
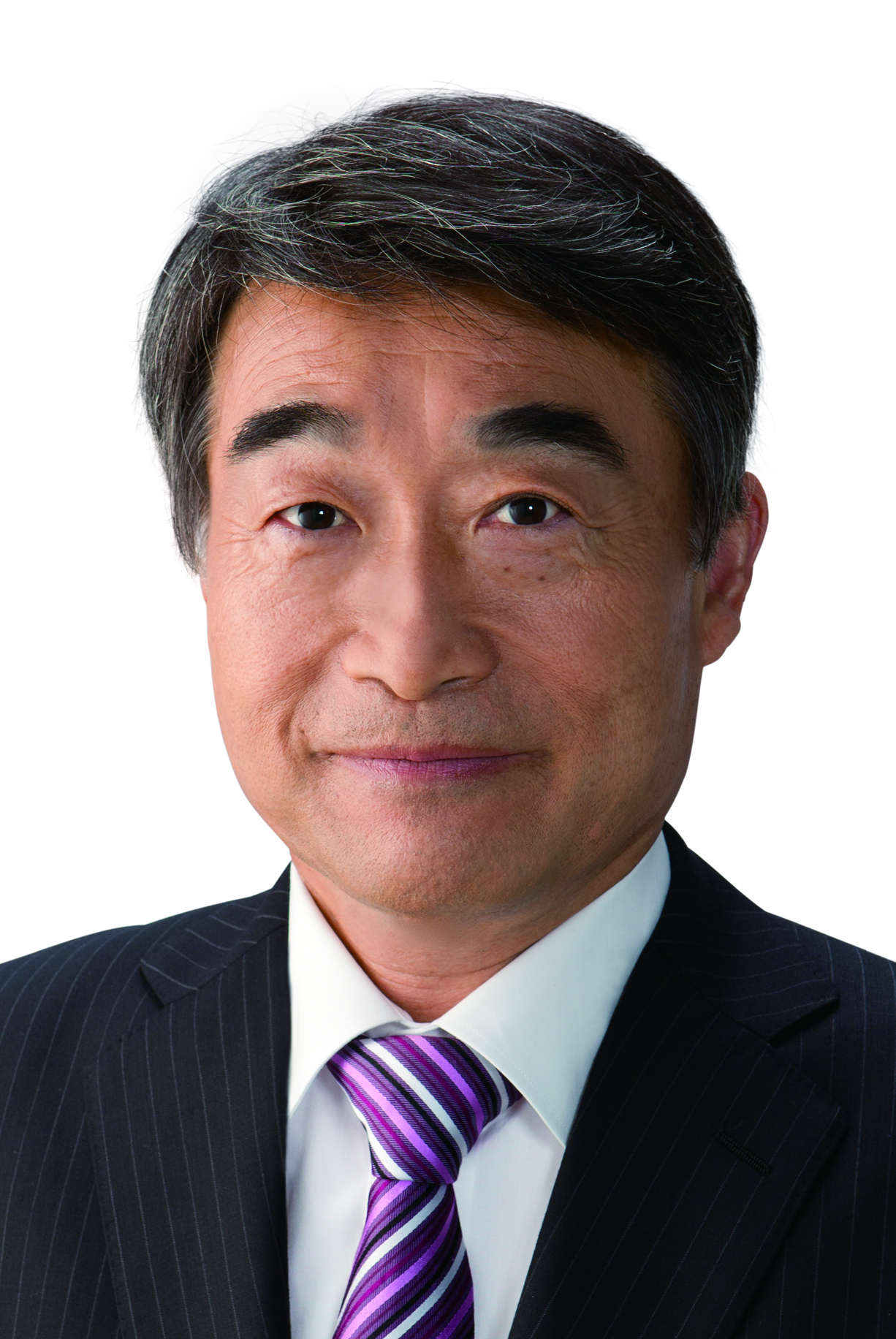
- Official portrait, 2012

Minister of Health, Labour and Welfare
- In office 2 October 2018 – 11 September 2019
- Prime Minister: Shinzo Abe
- Preceded by: Katsunobu Katō
- Succeeded by: Katsunobu Katō

Minister for Reconstruction
- In office 26 December 2012 – 3 September 2014
- Prime Minister: Shinzo Abe
- Preceded by: Tatsuo Hirano
- Succeeded by: Wataru Takeshita

Member of the House of Representatives
- In office 19 December 2012 – 9 October 2024
- Preceded by: Kazumi Ota
- Succeeded by: Kōichirō Genba
- Constituency: Fukushima 2nd
- In office 19 June 1993 – 21 June 2009
- Preceded by: Tsuneharu Satō
- Succeeded by: Kazumi Ota
- Constituency: Fukushima 1st (1993–1996); Fukushima 2nd (1996–2009)

Personal details
- Born: 7 March 1951 (age 75) Kōriyama, Fukushima, Japan
- Party: Liberal Democratic
- Children: Taku Nemoto
- Education: University of Tokyo

Takumi Nemoto (根本 匠, Nemoto Takumi; born 7 March 1951) is a former Japanese politician of the Liberal Democratic Party (LDP) who served as a member of the House of Representatives in the Diet (national legislature).

A native of Kōriyama, Fukushima and graduate of the University of Tokyo he joined the Ministry of Construction (which is now part of Ministry of Land, Infrastructure and Transport) in 1974. Leaving the ministry in 1991 he was elected to the Diet for the first time in 1993. Nemoto was appointed as Minister for Reconstruction in the Second Abe Cabinet on 26 December 2012.

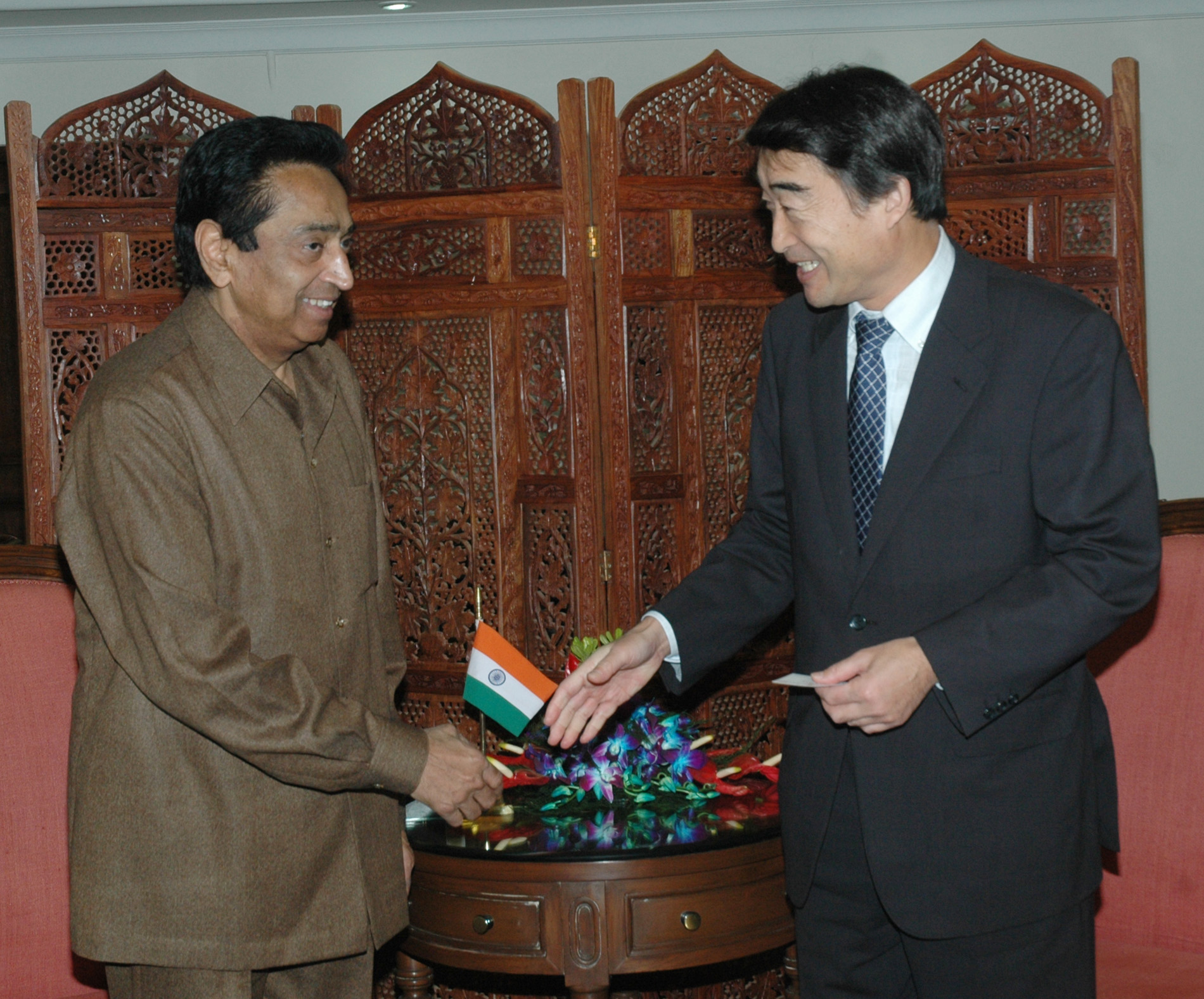
Nemoto (right) meeting with the Indian Minister for Commerce and Industry Kamal Nath in 2006

Nemoto has served as the Minister of Health, Labour and Welfare from 2 October 2018 to 11 September 2019. In January 2019, it was revealed that the Ministry of Health, Labour, and Welfare had been publishing inaccurate monthly labor survey data for nearly 15 years, which led to over 20 million people being underpaid in work-related benefits. The opposition accused Nemoto of being involved in a government coverup to boost Prime Minister Abe's Abenomics policies. A motion of no-confidence was filed against Nemoto on March 1 but was voted down by the ruling LDP coalition.

As a member of a parliamentary committee responding to a petition advocating a law prohibiting businesses from forcing female workers to wear high-heeled shoes (KuToo movement), he expressed that it was "necessary and reasonable" to mandate this for female workers.

== See also ==
- KuToo movement
