= Tax Cuts Japan =

Tax Cuts Japan 減税日本・反TPP・脱原発を実現する党
- Secretary-General: Shizuka Kamei
- Co-presidents: Takashi Kawamura; Masahiko Yamada
- Founded: 22 November 2012
- Dissolved: 27 November 2012
- Preceded by: Genzei Nippon
- Merged into: Tomorrow Party of Japan
- Headquarters: Nagoya, Aichi Prefecture and Tokyo
- Ideology: Neoliberalism; Environmentalism
- Political position: Centre
- Colors: Blue

Tax Cuts Japan – Anti-TPP – Zero Nuclear Party (減税日本・反TPP・脱原発を実現する党, Genzei Nippon · Han TTP · Datsu-Genpatsu o Jitsugen suru Tō) commonly known as the Zero Nuclear Party in English-speaking countries and as Datsu-Genpatsu (脱原発, roughly "phase down nuclear power") in Japan, was a short-lived Japanese political party that was formed on 22 November 2012. Nagoya mayor Takashi Kawamura and Masahiko Yamada were co-presidents and Shizuka Kamei served as secretary-general. The party was merged with other groups to form the Tomorrow Party of Japan on November 27, 2012.

== Presidents of TCJ ==
No.	Name	Term of office	
No.	Name	Took office	Left office
Preceding party: Genzei Nippon (national wing)
1	Co-leadership: Takashi Kawamura / Masahiko Yamada	22 November 2012	27 November 2012
Successor party: Tomorrow Party

== See also ==
- Genzei Nippon
