= Iwate Prefectural Assembly =

Parliament of Iwate, Japan

Iwate Prefectural Assembly 岩手県議会 Iwate-ken Gikai

Type
- Type: Unicameral

History
- Founded: 1878; 1947 (current local autonomy law)

Leadership
- President (gichō): Hiroshi Sasaki (佐々木博, Sasaki Hiroshi), Democratic Party since September 2011
- Vice President (fuku-gichō): Iwami Yanagimura (柳村岩見, Yanagimura Iwami), Liberal Democratic Party since September 2011
- Seats: 48 assembly members

Website
- www.pref.iwate.jp/~hp0731/

The Iwate Prefectural Assembly (岩手県議会, Iwate-ken Gikai) is the prefectural parliament of Iwate Prefecture, Japan.

Its 48 members are elected every four years in 16 districts by single non-transferable vote.

The assembly is responsible for enacting and amending prefectural ordinances, approving the budget and voting on important administrative appointments made by the governor including the vice governors.

Iwate is one of three prefectures whose assemblies are currently led by the DJP majority. The others are the Tokyo Metropolitan Assembly and the Mie Prefectural Assembly.

== Members ==
As of 20 September 2019:

| Constituency | Members | Party |
|---|---|---|
| Morioka | Junko Chiba | Iwate Kenmin Club |
| Morioka | Yoshinori Karuishi | Kibō Iwate |
| Morioka | Masanobu Kobayashi | Komeito |
| Morioka | Kazuko Konishi | Social Democratic Party |
| Morioka | Shin Saitō | Japanese Communist Party |
| Morioka | Kōsuke Takahashi | LDP |
| Morioka | Tajima Takahashi | Iwate Shinseikai |
| Morioka | Yasuki Uehara | Independent |
| Morioka | Hiromasa Yonai | LDP |
| Morioka | Keiko Yoshida | Iwate Shinseikai |
| Miyako | Seishi Itō | Kibō Iwate |
| Miyako | Yoshihiko Jōnai | LDP |
| Miyako | Nobukazu Sasaki | LDP |
| Ōfunato | Sakari Chiba | Iwate Shinseikai |
| Hanamaki | Shinkō Kawamura | LDP |
| Hanamaki | Yukihiro Kimura | Social Democratic Party |
| Hanamaki | Shin Nasukawa | Kibō Iwate |
| Hanamaki | Jun'ichi Sasaki | Kibō Iwate |
| Kitakami | Keiko Satō | Kibō Iwate |
| Kitakami | Toshinobu Sekine | Kibō Iwate |
| Kitakami | Hajime Takahashi | Kibō Iwate |
| Kitakami | Yasuyuki Takahashi | LDP |
| Kuji | Gen Iwaki | Kibō Iwate |
| Kuji | Hitoshi Nakatai | Iwate Shinseikai |
| Tōno | Katsuko Kudō | Independent |
| Ichinoseki | Tadashi Iizawa | Iwate Kenmin Club |
| Ichinoseki | Makoto Iwabuchi | Kibō Iwate |
| Ichinoseki | Hiroyuki Kanzaki | LDP |
| Ichinoseki | Tomokazu Sasaki | Iwate Shinseikai |
| Ichinoseki | Ichirō Takada | Japanese Communist Party |
| Rikuzentakata | Shigemitsu Sasaki | LDP |
| Kamaishi | Tomokazu Iwasaki | LDP |
| Kamaishi | Kyō Ono | Iwate Shinseikai |
| Ninohe | Ō Itsukaichi | Kibō Iwate |
| Ninohe | Fumitomo Matsukura | LDP |
| Hachimantai | Tsutō Chiba | LDP |
| Hachimantai | Katsuhiro Kudō | Iwate Kenmin Club |
| Ōshū | Hideyuki Chiba | Kibō Iwate |
| Ōshū | Mitsuko Chida | Japanese Communist Party |
| Ōshū | Hiroshi Gōkon | Kibō Iwate |
| Ōshū | Hironori Kanno | Kibō Iwate |
| Ōshū | Tsutomu Sasaki | Iwate Kenmin Club |
| Takizawa | Huxel Mihoko | Iwate Kenmin Club |
| Takizawa | Satoru Takeda | LDP |
| Takizawa | Makoto Yanagimura | Kibō Iwate |
| Shiwa | Katsunori Tamura | Iwate Shinseikai |
| Shiwa | Tsutomu Usuzawa | LDP |
| Kunohe | Daisuke Kudō | Iwate Shinseikai |
