= 2012 Japanese general election =

- 16 December 2012

All 480 seats in the House of Representatives 241 seats needed for a majority
- Turnout: 59.32% (▼9.87pp; Const. votes); 59.31% (▼9.88pp; PR votes)
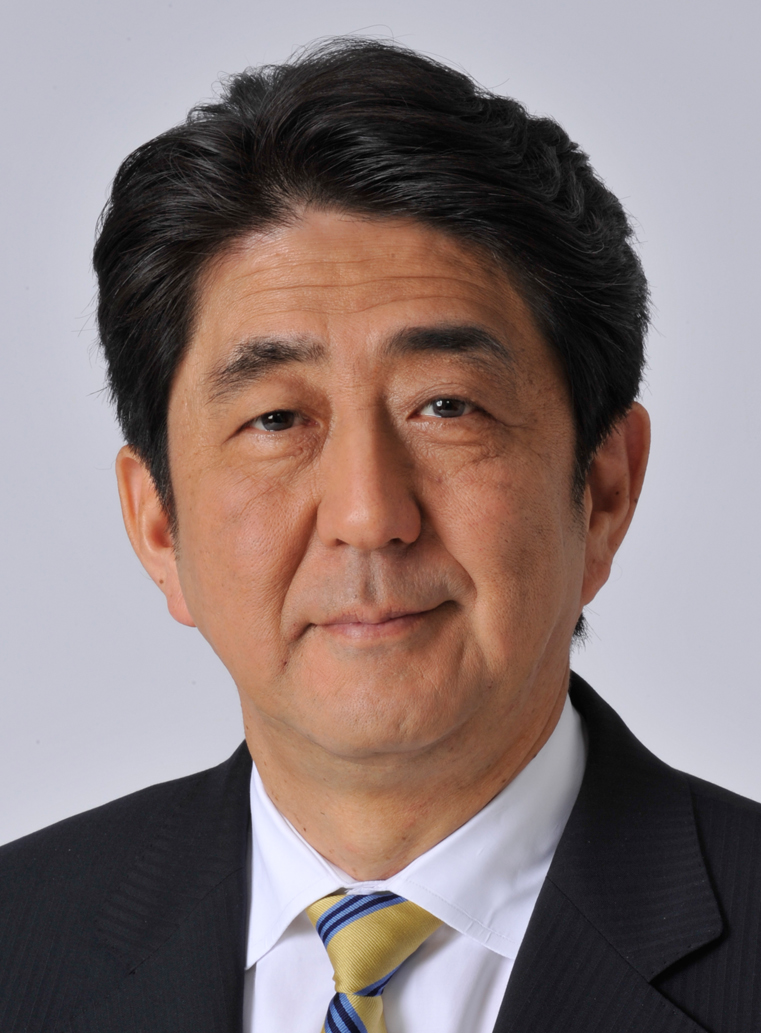

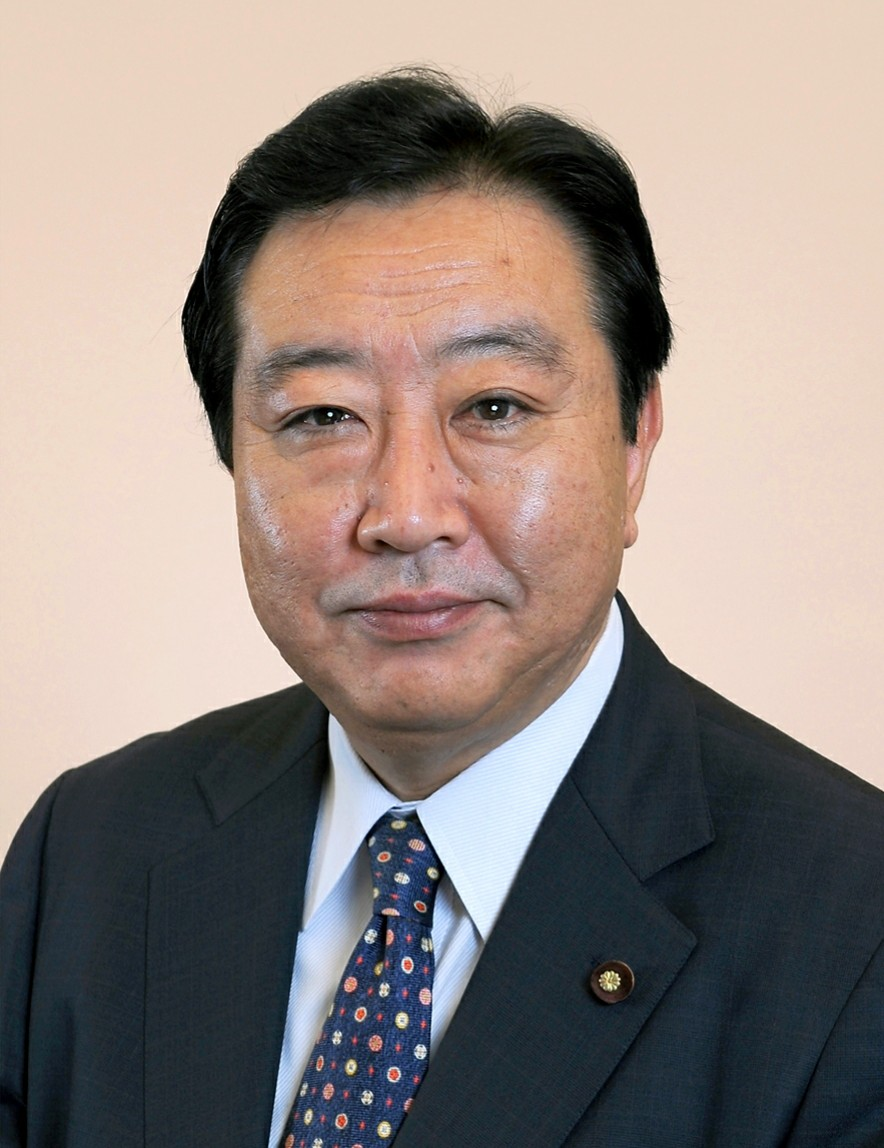

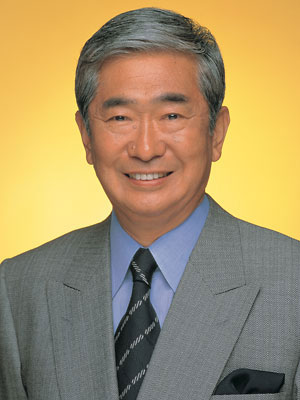

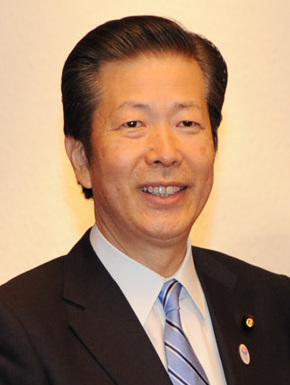

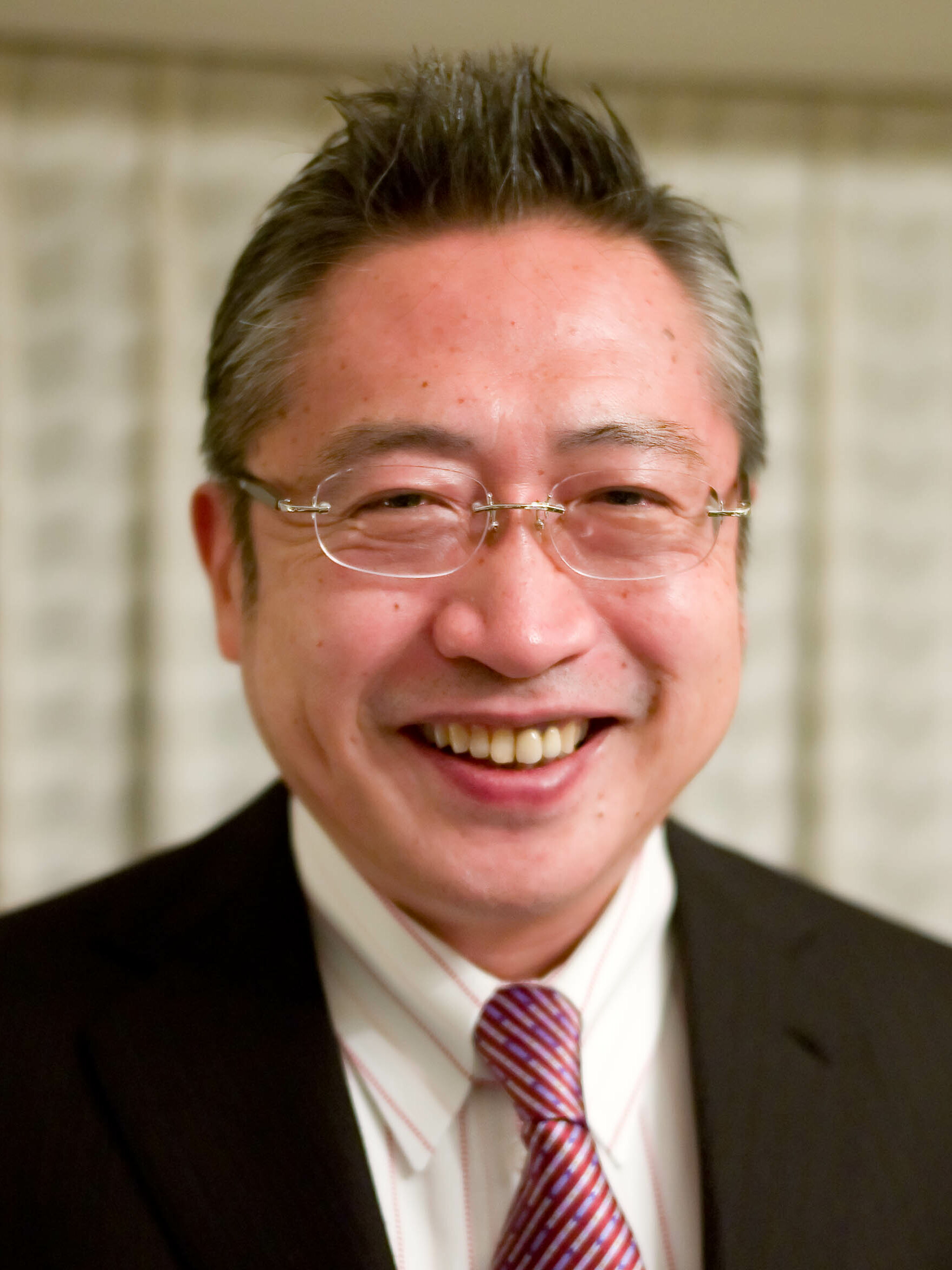

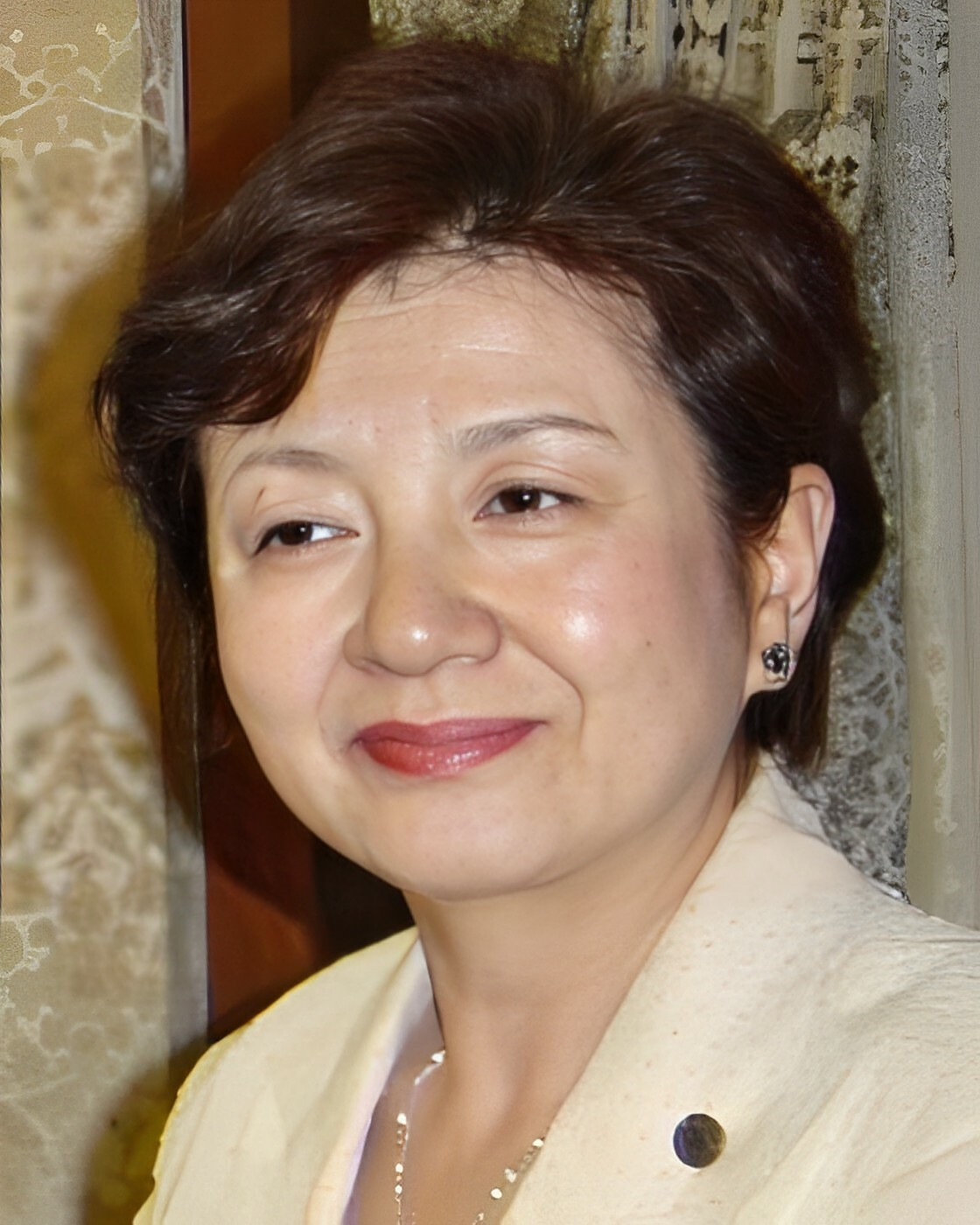

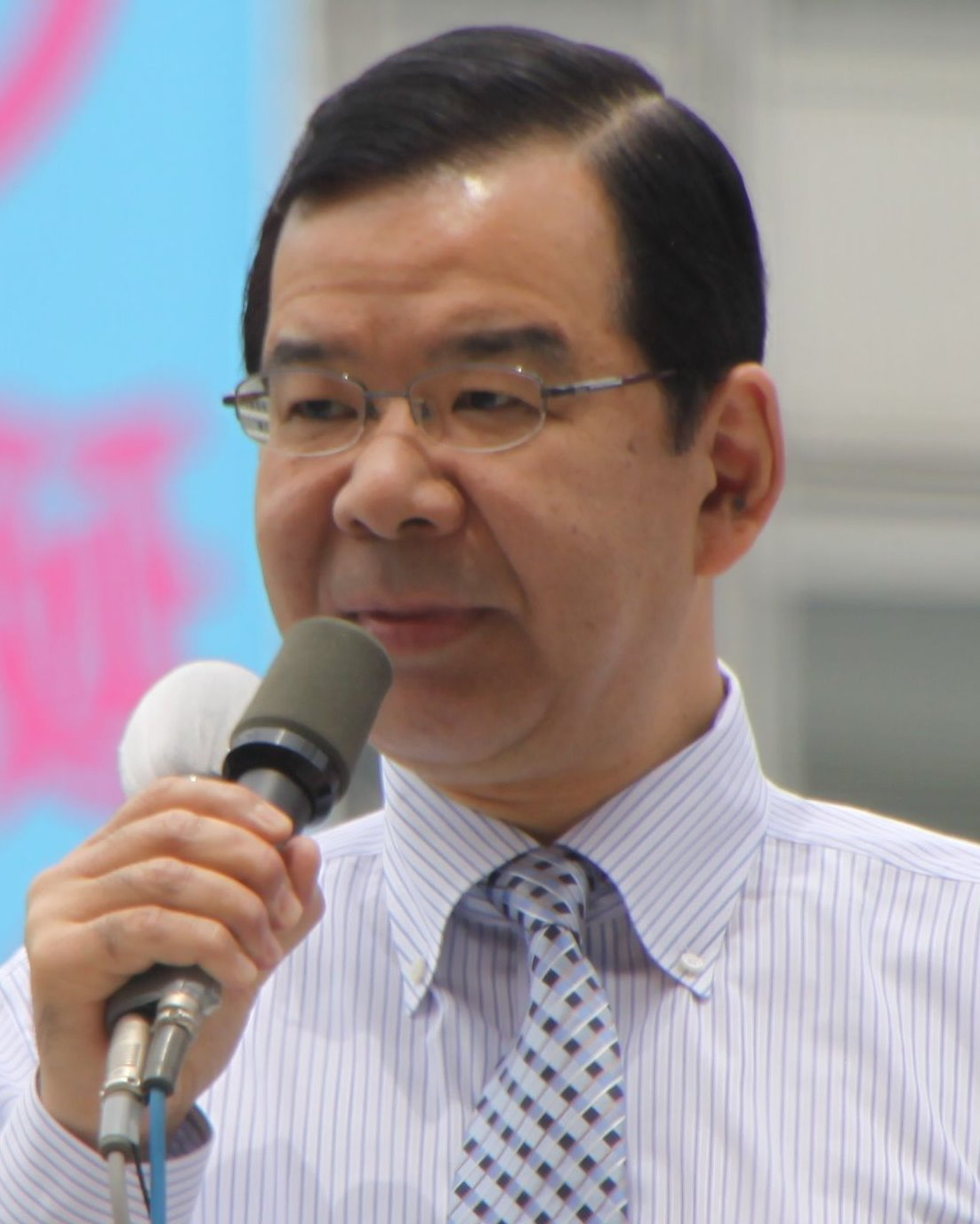

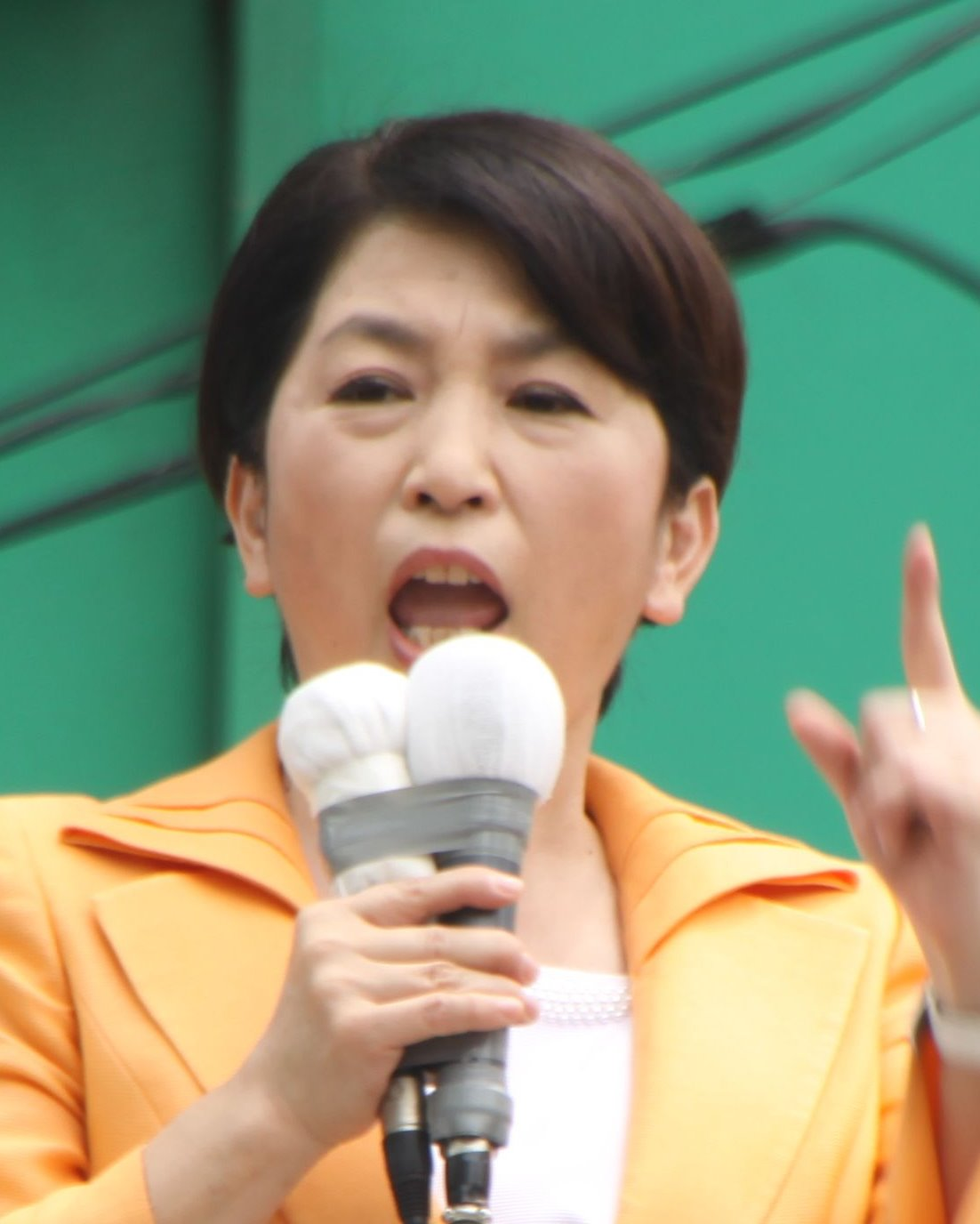
	First party	Second party	Third party
Leader	Shinzō Abe	Yoshihiko Noda	Shintaro Ishihara
Party	LDP	Democratic	Restoration
Last election	119 seats	308 seats	Did not exist
Seats before	118	230	11
Seats won	294	57	54
Seat change	▲175	▼251	New
Constituency vote	25,643,309	13,598,774	6,942,354
% and swing	43.01% (▲4.33pp)	22.81% (▼24.62pp)	11.64% (New)
Regional vote	16,624,457	9,268,653	12,262,228
% and swing	27.79% (▲1.06pp)	15.49% (▼26.92pp)	20.50% (New)
	Fourth party	Fifth party	Sixth party
Leader	Natsuo Yamaguchi	Yoshimi Watanabe	Yukiko Kada
Party	Komeito	Your	Tomorrow
Last election	21 seats	5 seats	Did not exist
Seats before	21	8	61
Seats won	31	18	9
Seat change	▲10	▲13	New
Constituency vote	885,881	2,807,245	2,992,366
% and swing	1.49% (▲0.38pp)	4.71% (▲3.84pp)	5.02% (New)
Regional vote	7,116,474	5,245,586	3,423,915
% and swing	11.90% (▲0.45pp)	8.77% (▲4.50pp)	5.72% (New)
	Seventh party	Eighth party
Leader	Kazuo Shii	Mizuho Fukushima
Party	JCP	Social Democratic
Last election	9 seats	7 seats
Seats before	9	5
Seats won	8	2
Seat change	▼1	▼5
Constituency vote	4,700,290	451,762
% and swing	7.88% (▲3.66pp)	0.76% (▼1.19pp)
Regional vote	3,689,159	1,420,790
% and swing	6.17% (▼0.86pp)	2.36% (▼1.91pp)
- Districts and PR districts shaded according to winners' vote strength
Prime Minister before election
Yoshihiko Noda
Democratic
Elected Prime Minister
Shinzo Abe
LDP

General elections were held in Japan on 16 December 2012. The Liberal Democratic Party won a landslide victory, ejecting the Democratic Party from power after three years. It was the fourth worst defeat suffered by a ruling party in Japanese history.

Voting took place in all representatives' constituencies of Japan including proportional blocks, in order to appoint Members of Diet to seats in the House of Representatives, the lower house of the National Diet of Japan.

In July 2012, it was reported that the deputy prime minister Katsuya Okada had approached the Liberal Democratic Party to sound them out about dissolving the House of Representatives and holding the election in January 2013. An agreement was reached in August to dissolve the Diet and hold early elections "shortly" following the passage of a bill to raise the national consumption tax. Some right-wing observers asserted that as the result of introducing the consumption tax to repay the Japanese public debt, the DPJ lost around 75% of its pre-election seats.

== Background ==
The LDP had governed Japan for all but three years since 1955. However, in the 2009 election, the LDP suffered the worst defeat of a sitting government in modern Japanese history. Due to the characteristics of the Japanese election system, DPJ candidates won 308 seats in the House of Representatives (64.2% of seats), enabling Yukio Hatoyama to become prime minister. Since then, Japan had had two other prime ministers, Naoto Kan and Yoshihiko Noda. On 16 November, Noda dissolved parliament, thus allowing for a new election in a month's time, citing the lack of funds to carry on governmental functions and the need for an emergency budget.

Dissatisfaction with the DPJ-led government and the former LDP-led government led to the formation of several grassroots movements, collectively known as the "third pole," to counter the two major parties. The former Governor of Tokyo Shintarō Ishihara announced the renaming and reformation of the Sunrise Party on 14 November 2012; Ishihara co-lead the party with Takeo Hiranuma. On 17 November 2012 Mayor of Osaka Tōru Hashimoto and former Tokyo Governor Shintarō Ishihara announced the merger of the Japan Restoration Party and the Sunrise Party as a third force to contend the 16 December 2012 general election. It is Japan's first national political party that is based outside of Tokyo.

On 23 November Mayor of Nagoya Takashi Kawamura, former state minister Shizuka Kamei and former farm minister Masahiko Yamada joined forces together to launch Tax Cuts Japan – Oppose TPP – Zero Nuclear Party as another "third pole" national political party. On 28 November, the Governor of Shiga Yukiko Kada in Ōtsu announced the establishment of an anti-nuclear and gender equality focused party known as the Tomorrow Party of Japan, becoming the second national party based outside of Tokyo. Concurrently, the president of DPJ splinter group People's Life First, Ichirō Ozawa, dissolved the party, merging it into the Tomorrow Party. Tax Cuts Japan – Oppose TPP – Zero Nuclear Party and Japan Future Party attempted to merge with the aim of further countering the major and pro-nuclear parties. On 27 November Tax Cuts Japan – Oppose TPP – Zero Nuclear Party officially announced a merger with Tomorrow, with party co-leader Mashahiko Yamada saying, "We would also like to raise our hands in joining because our ways of thinking are the same."

== Opinion polls ==
Graph of poll results since 2009

Democratic
Liberal Democratic
New Komeito
Communist
Social Democratic
Your Party
Others incl. NPN, PNP, NRP and SP
No Party
Source: NHK

Parties' approval ratings from August to December 2009
Date	DPJ	LDP	NKP	YP	JCP	SDP	Other	No Party	Undecided
19–20 August (after GE)	42.0%	18.9%	2.2%	0.2%	1.2%	2.7%	2.0%	26.0%	4.3%
10–12 October	39.7%	16.7%	3.8%	0.2%	0.8%	3.0%	0.3%	29.1%	5.9%
6–8 November	37.7%	14.1%	3.8%	0.5%	1.6%	1.6%	0.3%	33.8%	6.3%
11–13 December	35.6%	17.1%	1.6%	0.2%	2.3%	1.2%	0.3%	34.6%	5.8%

Parties' approval ratings from 2010
Date	DPJ	LDP	NKP	YP	JCP	SDP	Other	No Party	Undecided
9–11 January	34.9%	18.3%	3.3%	1.2%	1.9%	0.8%	0.6%	33.8%	5.2%
5–7 February	30.0%	18.2%	2.3%	1.2%	3.0%	1.1%	0.3%	37.6%	6.2%
5–7 March	25.8%	17.1%	2.7%	3.5%	2.1%	1.0%	0.5%	41.7%	5.6%
9–11 April	22.2%	16.1%	3.6%	2.9%	2.5%	1.1%	1.0%	44.4%	6.2%
5–7 May	20.8%	17.9%	3.0%	3.1%	2.2%	0.9%	1.8%	44.4%	7.0%
11–13 May (Before Kan)	30.7%	17.0%	3.8%	1.9%	2.8%	1.8%	1.2%	35.2%	5.7%
11–13 June	34.3%	15.8%	2.9%	2.7%	1.6%	1.5%	0.9%	32.7%	7.6%
17–19 July	29.8%	20.1%	3.2%	8.6%	2.7%	1.4%	0.7%	27.4%	6.1%
6–8 August	28.9%	19.5%	3.1%	7.4%	2.3%	0.7%	0.4%	30.4%	7.3%
18–20 September	36.2%	18.8%	3.2%	4.2%	1.5%	1.0%	0.5%	29.5%	5.2%
9–11 October	29.6%	21.5%	2.6%	4.2%	1.8%	1.0%	0.4%	33.6%	5.3%
5–7 November	24.1%	22.1%	3.3%	4.6%	2.9%	0.2%	0.7%	35.9%	6.2%
10–12 December	21.3%	22.6%	3.1%	3.2%	2.6%	1.2%	0.6%	39.0%	6.4%

Parties' approval ratings from 2011
Date	DPJ	LDP	NKP	JCP	SDP	YP	Other	No Party	Undecided
8–10 January	21.9%	22.0%	2.9%	3.7%	1.8%	1.4%	0.3%	40.7%	5.3%
11–13 February	20.2%	21.7%	3.9%	2.9%	2.3%	1.0%	0.6%	42.1%	5.5%
15–17 April	19.2%	23.3%	2.8%	2.7%	2.2%	0.8%	0.4%	41.9%	6.7%
13–15 May	17.6%	22.6%	3.7%	1.8%	2.6%	0.7%	0.8%	45.2%	5.0%
10–12 June	20.4%	21.1%	4.5%	2.3%	1.4%	0.8%	0.3%	43.1%	6.0%
8–10 July	13.6%	23.4%	3.4%	2.8%	2.2%	1.0%	0.2%	46.2%	7.2%
5–7 August	16.4%	25.0%	3.0%	2.7%	2.7%	0.8%	0.4%	42.8%	6.3%
9–11 September	24.9%	19.1%	2.9%	1.7%	1.4%	1.0%	0.1%	44.1%	4.7%
8–10 October	22.6%	18.4%	4.1%	2.2%	1.9%	1.5%	0.3%	42.6%	6.4%
11–13 November	20.9%	20.4%	3.3%	2.9%	1.6%	1.1%	0.1%	42.9%	6.7%
9–11 December	16.9%	18.3%	3.4%	4.4%	1.8%	0.7%	0.8%	45.5%	8.3%

Parties' approval ratings from 2012
Date	DPJ	LDP	NKP	JCP	SDP	YP	Other	No Party	Undecided
7–9 January	18.5%	18.3%	3.7%	2.7%	2.0%	0.7%	1.0%	46.1%	7.2%
10–12 February	17.6%	16.9%	3.1%	2.9%	1.6%	0.6%	0.8%	49.4%	7.2%
9–11 March	18.1%	17.2%	2.9%	2.9%	2.6%	1.1%	1.1%	48.7%	5.4%
6–8 April	16.7%	18.8%	2.8%	1.2%	2.2%	0.8%	1.5%	49.2%	6.8%
11–13 May	18.4%	19.9%	3.8%	1.1%	0.5%	2.2%	1.5%	47.1%	5.6%
8–10 June	16.9%	20.9%	2.4%	1.7%	0.3%	2.7%	1.3%	47.3%	6.6%
6–8 July	15.2%	19.8%	2.9%	1.7%	0.3%	1.1%	0.7%	52.0%	6.3%
10–12 August	14.3%	23.9%	3.0%	2.4%	0.1%	2.1%	0.9%	45.9%	6.6%
7–9 September	16.7%	20.1%	4.5%	1.9%	0.6%	1.3%	2.3%	45.2%	6.9%
6–8 October	13.8%	26.2%	2.8%	1.6%	0.4%	1.2%	3.4%	45.2%	5.4%
9–11 November	12.7%	25.0%	3.0%	2.0%	0.5%	1.2%	3.0%	45.8%	7.4%
7–9 December	16.1%	26.6%	4.1%	2.7%	0.7%	2.1%	6.9%	33.5%	7.4%

Graph of the current Cabinet Approval/Disapproval Ratings

=== Party polling for the 180 proportional seats ===
Poll source	Date(s) administered	Undecided or declined								
Poll source	Date(s) administered	Undecided or declined	DPJ	LDP	JRP	PLF ↓ TPJ	NKP	JCP	YP	SDP
Asahi Shimbun	15–16 November 2012	44%	16%	23%	6%	1%	3%	2%	2%	1%
Yomiuri Shimbun	16–17 November 2012	43%	13%	22%	13%	—	—	—	—	—
Asahi Shimbun	17–18 November 2012	46%	15%	23%	16%	—	4%	—	—	—
Kyodo News	17–18 November 2012	43%	10.8%	23%	—	—	—	—	—	—
Yomiuri Shimbun	23–25 November 2012	—	10%	25%	14%	2%	6%	—	2%	—
Kyodo News	24–25 November 2012	45%	8.4%	18.7%	10.3%	2%	4%	—	3%	—
Asahi Shimbun	24–25 November 2012	41%	13%	23%	9%	2%	4%	—	3%	—
Nikkei Business Daily	28 November 2012	—	13%	23%	15%	5%	4%	—	—	—
Kyodo News	1–2 December 2012	—	9.3%	18.4%	10.4%	3.5%	4.8%	—	—	—
Asahi Shimbun	1–2 December 2012	41%	15%	20%	9%	3%	4%	3%	3%	1%
Yomiuri Shimbun	30 Nov.-2 Dec 2012	—	13%	19%	13%	5%	—	—	5%	—
NHK	7–9 December 2012	—	10%	21%	11%	—	—	—	—	—
Yomiuri Shimbun	7–9 December 2012	—	12%	29%	11%	3%	—	—	—	—
Asahi Shimbun	8–9 December 2012	43%	14%	22%	8%	2%	5%	4%	2%	—
Kyodo News	12–13 December 2012	40%	11%	23%	10%	—	—	—	—	—

=== PM polling ===
Poll source	Date(s) administered			
Poll source	Date(s) administered	Noda DPJ	Abe LDP	Ishihara JRP
Kyodo News	3–4 November 2012	29.3%	40%	—
Asahi Shimbun	15–16 November 2012	31%	33%	—
Yomiuri Shimbun	16–17 November 2012	31%	37%	—
Kyodo News	17–18 November 2012	32.1%	35%	—
Yomiuri Shimbun	23–25 November 2012	19%	29%	22%
Kyodo News	24–25 November 2012	30%	33.9%	—
Yomiuri Shimbun	30 Nov.-2 Dec 2012	21%	28%	—
NHK	7–9 December 2012	19%	28%	—
Kyodo News	8–9 December 2012	31%	39%	—
Kyodo News	12–13 December 2012	29%	34%	—

== Pre-election composition ==
As of official announcement (kōji [=deadline for candidate registration, legal campaign start, start of early voting on following day]) on 4 December – note that the government had lost its majority, already slim at the time of dissolution of the House of Representatives (16 November), due to further defections during the positioning of candidates for the election.

↓
139	107	1	233
LDP & NKP	Other opposition	V	Incumbent government (DPJ & PNP)

== Results ==
Constituency Cartogram

Party	Proportional			Constituency			Total seats	+/–
Party	Votes	%	Seats	Votes	%	Seats	Total seats	+/–
Liberal Democratic Party	16,624,457	27.62	57	25,643,309	43.01	237	294	+175
Japan Restoration Party	12,262,228	20.38	40	6,942,354	11.64	14	54	New
Democratic Party of Japan	9,628,653	16.00	30	13,598,774	22.81	27	57	−251
New Komeito Party	7,116,474	11.83	22	885,881	1.49	9	31	+10
Your Party	5,245,586	8.72	14	2,807,245	4.71	4	18	+13
Japanese Communist Party	3,689,159	6.13	8	4,700,290	7.88	0	8	−1
Tomorrow Party of Japan	3,423,915	5.69	7	2,992,366	5.02	2	9	New
Social Democratic Party	1,420,790	2.36	1	451,762	0.76	1	2	−5
New Party Daichi	346,848	0.58	1	315,604	0.53	0	1	0
Happiness Realization Party	216,150	0.36	0	65,983	0.11	0	0	0
New Renaissance Party	134,781	0.22	0				0	0
People's New Party	70,847	0.12	0	117,185	0.20	1	1	−2
New Party Nippon				62,697	0.11	0	0	−1
21st Century Japan Restoration Party				17,711	0.03	0	0	New
Natural Party				7,831	0.01	0	0	New
Ainu Party				7,495	0.01	0	0	New
Euthanasia Party				2,603	0.00	0	0	New
World Economic Community Party				1,011	0.00	0	0	0
Independents				1,006,468	1.69	5	5	−1
Total	60,179,888	100.00	180	59,626,569	100.00	300	480	0
Valid votes	60,179,888	97.60		59,626,568	96.69			
Invalid/blank votes	1,480,081	2.40		2,040,970	3.31			
Total votes	61,659,969	100.00		61,667,538	100.00			
Registered voters/turnout	103,959,866	59.31		103,959,866	59.32			
Source: Ministry of Internal Affairs and Communications, CLEA

=== By prefecture ===
Prefecture	Total seats	Seats won								
Prefecture	Total seats	LDP	DPJ	JRP	NKP	Your	TPJ	SDP	PNP	Ind.
Aichi	15	13	2							
Akita	3	3								
Aomori	4	4								
Chiba	13	11	2							
Ehime	4	4								
Fukui	3	3								
Fukuoka	11	10								1
Fukushima	5	4	1							
Gifu	5	5								
Gunma	5	5								
Hiroshima	7	6					1			
Hokkaido	12	11			1					
Hyōgo	12	8	2		2					
Ibaraki	7	5	1							1
Ishikawa	3	3								
Iwate	4	1	2				1			
Kagawa	3	2	1							
Kagoshima	5	4							1	
Kanagawa	18	14	1		1	2				
Kōchi	3	3								
Kumamoto	5	4		1						
Kyoto	6	4	2							
Mie	5	3	2							
Miyagi	6	5	1							
Miyazaki	3	3								
Nagano	5	3	2							
Nagasaki	4	4								
Nara	4	3	1							
Niigata	6	6								
Ōita	3	3								
Okayama	5	4		1						
Okinawa	4	3						1		
Osaka	19	3		12	4					
Saga	3	3								
Saitama	15	13	1							1
Shiga	4	4								
Shimane	2	2								
Shizuoka	8	6	2							
Tochigi	5	4				1				
Tokushima	3	3								
Tokyo	25	21	2		1	1				
Tottori	2	2								
Toyama	3	3								
Wakayama	3	2	1							
Yamagata	3	2								1
Yamaguchi	4	4								
Yamanashi	3	1	1							1
Total	300	237	27	14	9	4	2	1	1	5

=== By PR block ===
PR block	Total seats	Seats won								
PR block	Total seats	LDP	JRP	DPJ	NKP	Your	JCP	TPJ	SDP	NPD
Chūgoku	11	5	2	2	2					
Hokkaido	8	3	1	2	1					1
Hokuriku–Shinetsu	11	4	3	2	1	1				
Kinki (Kansai)	29	7	10	3	4	2	2	1		
Kyushu	21	7	4	3	3	1	1	1	1	
Northern Kanto	20	6	4	3	3	2	1	1		
Shikoku	6	2	2	1	1					
Southern Kanto	22	6	5	4	2	3	1	1		
Tohoku	14	5	2	3	1	1	1	1		
Tōkai	21	7	4	4	2	2	1	1		
Tokyo	17	5	3	3	2	2	1	1		
Total	180	57	40	30	22	14	8	7	1	1

== Aftermath ==
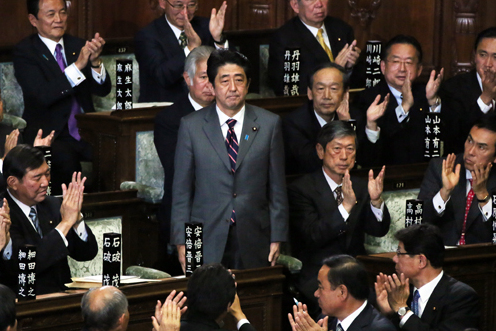
Shinzo Abe is elected Prime Minister by the Diet, 26 December 2012.

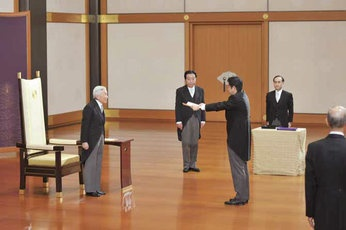
Following the Diet vote, Emperor Akihito appoints Abe as the Prime Minister at the Imperial Palace in Chiyoda Ward, Tōkyō Metropolis on 26 December 2012. Yoshihiko Noda, outgoing Prime Minister, watches on.

As the Liberal Democratic Party (LDP) won 294 seats and their allies, the New Komeito Party, 31 seats, a coalition of the two parties would be able to form a two-thirds majority in the House of Representatives, enabling them to overrule the House of Councillors. The significant swing back towards conservative politics was attributed to economic anxieties, including fear of falling behind China. Despite this landslide victory, Shinzo Abe acknowledged that his party won mainly because of voter antipathy towards the Democratic Party and not due to a resurgence in popularity for the LDP.

The election was an unmitigated disaster for the Democratic Party, which lost three-quarters of its 230 seats in the lower house to finish with just 57. In addition, seven members of the Cabinet lost their seats, the most ever in an election. Naoto Kan, who preceded Noda as prime minister, lost his constituency as well. Overall, this marked the worst performance by a ruling party in the post–World War II era. As a result, Yoshihiko Noda resigned from his post as party president.

The Tomorrow Party of Japan, which formed shortly before the election, consisted mostly of incumbents defecting from the Democratic Party. Most of these incumbents were unseated, causing the party to lose 86% of its strength only weeks after forming. Both the Japan Restoration Party and Your Party emerged as viable players in the Diet, while the traditional left parties Social Democratic Party and Japanese Communist Party continued to decline in strength and relevance.

The voter turnout of 59.3% was the lowest since World War II.

=== Reactions and analysis ===
The Liberal Democratic Party had campaigned on a tough stance on the Senkaku Islands dispute, leading to speculation as to how the new government would deal with the issue. Abe made his party's position clear immediately following the election, stating that "[their] objective is to stop the challenge" from China with regards to ownership of the islands. The re-election of the liberal conservative LDP raised concern in foreign media that Japan's relations with its neighbours – China and South Korea – would become strained, given the past visits to the Yasukuni Shrine by LDP prime ministers, the party's perceived de-emphasis of Japan's war crimes committed during World War II and their intention to amend the country's pacifist constitution to give more power to the Self-Defense Forces. Abe was also in favor of retaining nuclear energy in the country.

In response to the election, the Nikkei 225 Index increased by 1%, while the yen fell to ¥84.48 against the US dollar, the lowest rate in 20 months. Furthermore, the yield on 20-year Japanese government bonds (JCBs) rose to 1.710% a day after the election. This marked its highest level in nearly eight months.

United States President Barack Obama spoke to Abe via telephone to congratulate him on the results of the general election, and discussed ongoing efforts to enhance bilateral security cooperation as well as deepening economic ties.

=== Voiding of election ===
On 25 March 2013, the Hiroshima High Court ruled the election unconstitutional and the results void due to "the disparity in the value of one vote", which was up to 2.43 time the maximum constitutionally allowed disparity in some districts. The decision is expected to be appealed to the Supreme Court, and, if upheld, new elections must be held. The Supreme Court had previously ruled that the electoral system was unconstitutional without invalidating election results. Foreign Minister Fumio Kishida said that government would give electoral reform new thought and examine the situation carefully in order to respond in the appropriate manner. In November 2013, the Supreme Court ruled the election had been unconstitutional but declined to invalidate the results.

== See also ==
- List of districts of the House of Representatives of Japan
