= People's Life First =

People's Life First Japanese: 国民の生活が第一
- President: Ichirō Ozawa
- Secretary-General: Shōzō Azuma
- Councilors leader: Tadashi Hirono
- Representatives leader: Sadatoshi Kumagai
- Founder: Ichirō Ozawa
- Founded: 11 July 2012
- Dissolved: 16 December 2012
- Split from: Democratic Party of Japan
- Merged into: Tomorrow Party of Japan
- Ideology: Populism
- Political position: Centre

Website
- http://www.seikatsu1.jp

People's Life First (国民の生活が第一, Kokumin no Seikatsu ga Dai'ichi) was a short-lived political party in Japan. It had 37 out of the 480 seats in the House of Representatives, and 12 in the 242-member House of Councillors. On 28 November 2012, the party merged into Governor of Shiga Yukiko Kada's Japan Future Party based in Ōtsu.

== Foundation ==
The party was founded by Ichiro Ozawa and 48 other diet members who were in the Democratic Party of Japan (DPJ) after the DPJ government of Yoshihiko Noda voted to increase the consumption tax from 5% to 10%. The inaugural meeting was held at the parliamentary museum on 11 July 2012. The diet members included 37 lower house members and 12 upper house members. By the end of the month the party had become the third largest in the lower house behind the DPJ and the Liberal Democratic Party (LDP) and the fourth largest bloc in the upper house behind the DPJ, LDP, and New Komeito.

== History ==
=== Plans for alliances ===
Ozawa told his aides: "It'll be all right if we do it like the Olive Tree Coalition." Possible coalition partners would be the Osaka Restoration Association of Osaka mayor Toru Hashimoto, New Party Daichi – True Democrats, the Genzei Nippon party of Takashi Kawamura, the Aichi is Top of Japan party of Hideaki Ōmura and a possible party to be founded by Tokyo governor Shintaro Ishihara. He may also seek an alliance with the Social Democratic Party.

On 9 July 2012, Governor Takuya Tasso of Iwate Prefecture, historical home to the Ozawa family and the district that Ozawa represents, announced that he would cut ties with the DPJ and join the new party.

=== Motions against Prime Minister Yoshihiko Noda ===
On 3 August 2012, the People's Life First in concert with six other minor opposition parties (The Kizuna Party, Japanese Communist Party, Social Democratic Party, Your Party, New Party Nippon (which has no lower-house lawmaker) and the New Renaissance Party) agreed to submit a no confidence motion against Prime Minister Yoshihiko Noda in an effort to block the passage of the bill raising Japan's consumption tax from 5% to 10%. In the Japanese diet the support of 51 lawmakers is required to submit a no-confidence motion to the lower house. The motion was submitted to the House of Representatives on 7 August 2012, along with a censure motion against Noda in the House of Councillors. The main opposition Liberal Democratic Party was also considering its own no-confidence motion and censure motions if Noda did not agree to call a general election. The no-confidence motion was voted down 246 to 86, with the DPJ voting against and the LDP and its partner New Komeito deciding to be absent from the vote after Noda agreed to hold elections "soon".

On 29 August 2012, the House of Councillors passed a censure motion against Noda based on the one previously submitted by the seven opposition parties. The LDP and New Komeito had also been preparing their own censure motion but in the end the LDP, which had supported Noda's consumption tax increase, supported the censure motion of the other seven parties, while New Komeito abstained. While the censure motion was non-binding, the opposition parties planned to boycott the remaining sitting days before the diet session finished on September 8, preventing further legislation from being passed.

=== Addition of former Kizuna Party members ===
On November 15, 2012, after Noda called an early election for December 16, 2012, the Kizuna Party, which like People's Life First had been founded by DPJ defectors, decided to dissolve and merge with People's Life First. However, party leader Akira Uchiyama decided not to do so, instead planning to cooperate with former People's New Party leader Shizuka Kamei to form a third force in national politics. This change meant that the amount of lawmakers in the party would increase to 57, with 45 in the lower house and 12 members in the upper house.

=== Merger with Tomorrow Party of Japan and dissolution ===
Just prior to the December 16, 2012 General Election, the Diet members of the party joined the newly established Tomorrow Party of Japan, and the party was dissolved. The Tomorrow Party went into the election with 12 members in the upper house and 61 in the lower house, but performed poorly, with only nine members being re-elected.

== Goals ==
The party opposed the increase in the consumption tax and plans to reduce nuclear energy to zero. Nevertheless, many saw the party's, especially Ozawa's, opposition to the increase in consumption tax and plans to maintain nuclear energy usage as simply being politically expedient positions.

== Presidents of People's Life First ==
No.	Name	Term of office	
No.	Name	Took office	Left office
Split from: Democratic Party (1998)
1	Ichirō Ozawa	11 July 2012	16 December 2012
Successor party: Tomorrow Party
