= Tomorrow Party of Japan =

Tomorrow Party of Japan 日本未来の党 Nippon Mirai no Tō
- President: Tomoko Abe
- Secretary-General: Tetsunari Iida
- Founder: Yukiko Kada
- Founded: 28 November 2012
- Dissolved: 17 May 2013
- Merger of: People's Life First; Tax Cuts Japan
- Succeeded by: People's Life Party
- Headquarters: Ōtsu, Shiga Prefecture, Japan
- Ideology: Environmentalism; Anti-nuclear power
- Political position: Centre-left
- Colors: Green

Website
- http://nippon-mirai.jp/

Tomorrow Party of Japan (日本未来の党, Nippon Mirai no Tō), also known as the Japan Future Party, was a Japanese political party, formed on 28 November 2012 by Governor of Shiga Prefecture Yukiko Kada and dissolved in May 2013.

Kada created the party as an alternative to the then-ruling Democratic Party of Japan (DPJ) and the main opposition Liberal Democratic Party (LDP), and it quickly merged with former political runner Ichirō Ozawa's People's Life Party. It was the only political party which opposed nuclear power and the Trans-Pacific Strategic Economic Partnership. After a complete failure at the polls in the 16 December 2012 general election the party collapsed, and it officially dissolved in May 2013.

== History ==
There were talks with Mayor of Nagoya Takashi Kawamura and former Agriculture Minister Masahiko Yamada to further merge the Tax Cuts Japan into the TPJ as a single party. Some of the members of Green Wind also hinted at an intention to join the TPJ as well.

The party's policy platform for the 2012 general election included the elimination of nuclear power by 2022 and freezing the government's plan to raise the sales tax. It offered a similar platform to other leftist parties and some future political parties, maintaining an anti-TPP stance and anti-consumption tax stance as well.

It went into the election with 12 members in the upper house and 61 in the lower house, and acted as the third largest party, but performed poorly, with only nine members in the lower house being re-elected. The upper house members were not up for re-election.

Tensions grew within the party due to the influence of Ichirō Ozawa, and on 29 December 2012, the Ozawa group split from the TPJ and formed the Life Party while suggesting continued cooperation between both parties. Tomoko Abe remained the only TPJ diet member, meaning that the TPJ could not maintain official party status in the diet, which requires five members. Abe and Kada went to Green Wind, which had four diet members, over a possible merger, but the talks were not successful.

After the Shiga prefectural assembly passed a resolution requesting Kada to stop doubling as governor and the head of the TPJ, she resigned as head of the party on January 4, 2013.

The remnants of the TPJ were dissolved, and its assets were folded into Green Wind.

== Presidents of TPJ ==
No.	Name	Image	Term of office	
No.	Name	Image	Took office	Left office
Preceding parties: People's Life First & Tax Cuts Japan
1	Yukiko Kada		28 November 2012	4 January 2013
2	Tomoko Abe		4 January 2013	17 May 2013
Successor parties: People's Life Party & Green Wind

== Election results ==
=== General election results ===
Election	Leader	# of candidates	# of seats won	# of Constituency votes	% of Constituency vote	# of PR Block votes	% of PR Block vote
2012	Yukiko Kada	121	9 / 480	2,992,365	5.02%	3,423,915	5.72%
