= Osaka 10th district =

Legislative district of Japan

Osaka 10th District
- Parliamentary constituency for the Japanese House of Representatives
- Numbered map of Osaka Prefecture single-member districts
- Prefecture: Osaka
- Proportional District: Kinki
- Electorate: 321,805 (2016)

Current constituency
- Created: 1994
- Seats: One
- Party: Ishin
- Representative: Taku Ikeshita
- Created from: Osaka's 3rd "medium-sized" district
- Municipalities: Takatsuki city and Mishima county

Ōsaka 10th district (大阪府第10区, Ōsaka-fu daijikku or 大阪10区, Ōsaka-jikku) is a single-member electoral district of the House of Representatives, the lower house of the national Diet of Japan. It is located in northeastern Osaka and consists of Takatsuki city and the town of Shimamoto. As of 2016, 321,805 eligible voters were registered in the district.

A former representative for the district was Kiyomi Tsujimoto, policy chief of the Constitutional Democratic Party. Tsujimoto had originally been elected in 2000 and 2009 for the Social Democratic Party. She left in 2010 after disagreeing with her party's departure from the Democrat-led ruling coalition. Kenta Matsunami is the previous member of the district. In 2012, he ran for the Japan Restoration Party of former Osaka governor and mayor Tōru Hashimoto that won twelve district seats in the prefecture. Tsujimoto failed to gain re-election in 2021.

Before the electoral reform of the 1990s, the area had been part of the five-member Osaka 3rd district.

== List of representatives ==
Representative	Party	Dates	Notes
Kazuo Ishigaki	NFP	1996 – 1998	A former professional baseball player and coach, Takatsuki municipal and Osaka prefectural assemblyman for Kōmeitō; Joined the Liberal Party after the dissolution of the NFP, then returned to re-established/"New" Kōmeitō
Kazuo Ishigaki	LP	1998 – 2000	A former professional baseball player and coach, Takatsuki municipal and Osaka prefectural assemblyman for Kōmeitō; Joined the Liberal Party after the dissolution of the NFP, then returned to re-established/"New" Kōmeitō
Kazuo Ishigaki	NKP	2000	A former professional baseball player and coach, Takatsuki municipal and Osaka prefectural assemblyman for Kōmeitō; Joined the Liberal Party after the dissolution of the NFP, then returned to re-established/"New" Kōmeitō
Kiyomi Tsujimoto	SDP	2000 – 2002	Resigned over a scandal involving public funding for non-existent secretaries
Kenta Matsunami	LDP	2002 – 2003	Failed re-election in the Kinki PR block
Miyoko Hida	DPJ	2003 – 2005	Failed re-election in the Kinki PR block
Kenta Matsunami	LDP	2005 – 2009	Re-elected in the Kinki PR block
Kiyomi Tsujimoto	SDP	2009 – 2010	Left SDP and became independent member of the DPJ parliamentary group in 2010. Joined DPJ in 2011; Re-elected in the Kinki PR block
Kiyomi Tsujimoto	Ind	2010 – 2011	Left SDP and became independent member of the DPJ parliamentary group in 2010. Joined DPJ in 2011; Re-elected in the Kinki PR block
Kiyomi Tsujimoto	DPJ	2011 – 2012	Left SDP and became independent member of the DPJ parliamentary group in 2010. Joined DPJ in 2011; Re-elected in the Kinki PR block
Kenta Matsunami	JRP	2012 – 2014	
Kiyomi Tsujimoto	DPJ	2014 – 2016	Failed re-election in the Kinki PR block
Kiyomi Tsujimoto	DP	2016 – 2017	Failed re-election in the Kinki PR block
Kiyomi Tsujimoto	CDP	2017 – 2021	Failed re-election in the Kinki PR block
Taku Ikeshita	Ishin	2021 –	Former member of the Osaka Prefectural Assembly

== Election results ==
2026
Party	Candidate	Votes	%	±%
Ishin	Taku Ikeshita	86,557	45.1	▲1.0
Centrist Reform	Kanako Otsuji	50,324	26.2	▼6.5
LDP	Yōnosuke Kanō	38,442	20.0	▼3.2
Sanseitō	Tomoya Inoue	16,751	8.7	
Registered electors		316,783		
Turnout			62.06	▲3.58
Ishin hold				

2024
Party	Candidate	Votes	%	±%
Ishin	Taku Ikeshita	79,621	44.13	▲3.81
CDP	Kanako Otsuji (endorsed by SDP) (elected in Kinki PR block)	58,971	32.68	▼0.67
LDP	Yōnosuke Kanō endorsed by Kōmeitō)	41,838	23.19	▼3.14
Registered electors		317.471		
Majority		20,650	11.45	▲4.48
Turnout		180,430	58.48	▼4.84
Ishin hold				

2021
Party	Candidate	Votes	%	±%
Ishin	Taku Ikeshita	80,932	40.32	▲14.96
CDP	Kiyomi Tsujimoto	66,943	33.35	▼9.42
LDP	Kazuhide Ōkuma endorsed by Kōmeitō)	52,843	26.33	▼5.54
Majority		13,989	6.97	
Turnout			63.32	▲7.24
Ishin gain from CDP				

2017
Party	Candidate	Votes	%	±%
CDP	Kiyomi Tsujimoto	75,788	42.77	▲8.42
LDP	Kazuhide Ōkuma (elected by PR, endorsed by Kōmeitō)	56,483	31.87	▲2.29
Ishin	Kenta Matsunami	44,938	25.36	▼2.75
Majority		19,305	10.90	
Turnout			56.08	▼1.98
CDP hold		Swing	▲3.07	

2014
Party	Candidate	Votes	%	±%
Democratic	Kiyomi Tsujimoto	61,725	34.35	▲1.06
LDP	Kazuhide Ōkuma (elected by PR, endorsed by Kōmeitō)	53,160	29.58	▲6.55
Ishin	Kenta Matsunami (elected by PR)	50,516	28.11	▼8.08
JCP	Kazuhito Asanuma	14,318	7.97	▲0.49
Majority		8,565	4.77	
Turnout			58.06	▼5.71
Democratic gain from Ishin		Swing	▲4.57	

2012
Party	Candidate	Votes	%	±%
Restoration	Kenta Matsunami (endorsed by YP)	71,117	36.19	▼3.01
Democratic	Kiyomi Tsujimoto (elected by PR, endorsed by PNP)	65,411	33.29	▼17.24
LDP	Kazuhide Ōkuma	45,261	23.03	N/A
JCP	Kazuhito Asanuma	14,706	7.48	▼1.01
Majority		5,706	2.90	
Turnout			63.77	▲6.79
Restoration gain from Democratic		Swing	▲7.12	

2009
Party	Candidate	Votes	%	±%
Social Democratic	Kiyomi Tsujimoto (endorsed by DPJ and PNP)	109,693	50.53	▲19.00
LDP	Kenta Matsunami (elected by PR, endorsed by Kōmeitō)	85,106	39.20	▲0.78
JCP	Kazuhito Asanuma	18,425	8.49	▲2.66
Happiness Realization	Hiroshi Tsutsui	3,863	1.78	N/A
Majority		24,587	11.33	
Turnout		222,606	70.56	▲0.02
Social Democratic gain from LDP		Swing	▲9.11	

2005
Party	Candidate	Votes	%	±%
LDP	Kenta Matsunami	83,607	38.42	
Social Democratic	Kiyomi Tsujimoto (elected by PR)	68,614	31.53	
Democratic	Miyoko Hida	52,703	24.22	
JCP	Kazuhito Asanuma	12,703	5.83	
Turnout		220,810	70.54	

2003
Party	Candidate	Votes	%	±%
Democratic	Miyoko Hida	83,077	47.1	
LDP	Kenta Matsunami	68,646	38.9	
JCP	Etsuko Sugano	22,976	13.0	
Independent	Mamoru Shinbaru	1,600	0.9	
Turnout		180,710	57.99	

October 27, 2002 by-election
Party	Candidate	Votes	%	±%
LDP	Kenta Matsunami	43,252	34.2	
Independent	Yasuto Yoshida	36,328	28.8	
JCP	Etsuko Sugano	23,795	18.8	
Democratic	Toshio Emura	15,876	12.6	
Koizumi no Kai	Takahiro Kitaoka	2,722	2.2	
Independent	Yōichi Mizutani	2,453	0.9	
Independent	Hitoshi Takaya	1,516	1.2	
Independent	Toshifumi Nishimura	404	0.3	
Turnout		129,154	41.45	

2000
Party	Candidate	Votes	%	±%
Social Democratic	Kiyomi Tsujimoto	55,839	29.7	
LDP	Kazuo Ishigaki	55,108	29.3	
Democratic	Miyoko Hida (elected by PR)	52,598	28.0	
JCP	Manabu Ōmine	21,957	11.7	
Independent	Hitoshi Takaya	2,489	1.3	

1996
Party	Candidate	Votes	%	±%
New Frontier	Kazuo Ishigaki	53,623	31.4	
LDP	Shōnosuke Hayashi	45,655	26.7	
Democratic	Miyoko Hida (elected by PR)	33,802	19.8	
JCP	Katsunori Nagao	29,022	17.0	
Independent	Fukuko Ozawa	6,368	3.7	
Liberal League	Takashi Onoda	2,484	1.5	
Turnout		175,029	57.02	
