= Osaka 2nd district =

- Parliamentary constituency for the Japanese House of Representatives
- Numbered map of the Osaka city single seats
- Prefecture: Osaka
- Proportional District: Kinki
- Electorate: 441,748

Current constituency
- Created: 1994
- Seats: One
- Party: Ishin
- Representative: Ryō Takami
- Municipalities: Abeno-ku, Higashisumiyoshi-ku, Hirano-ku, and Ikuno-ku of Osaka.

Osaka 2nd district (大阪府第2区, Osaka-fu dai-niku or simply 大阪2区, Osaka-niku ) is a single-member constituency of the House of Representatives in the national Diet of Japan located in Osaka Prefecture.

== Areas covered ==
=== Since 2017 ===
- Part of Osaka
  - Abeno-ku
  - Higashisumiyoshi-ku
  - Hirano-ku
  - Ikuno-ku

=== 1994 - 2017 ===
- Part of Osaka
  - Abeno-ku
  - Higashisumiyoshi-ku
  - Hirano-ku

== List of representatives ==
Election	Representative	Party	Notes
1996	Megumu Satō	New Frontier	
1996	Megumu Satō	VoP	
1996	Megumu Satō	GGP	
1996	Megumu Satō	Independent	
1996	Megumu Satō	LDP	
2000	Akira Satō	LDP	
2003	Akira Satō	LDP	
2003	Akira Satō	Independent	
2005	Shika Kawajo	LDP	
2009	Hitoshi Hagihara	Democratic	
2009	Hitoshi Hagihara	PLF	
2009	Hitoshi Hagihara	Tomorrow	
2012	Akira Satō	LDP	
2014	Akira Satō	LDP	
2017	Akira Satō	LDP	
2021	Tadashi Morishima	Ishin	
2024	Tadashi Morishima	Ishin	
2024	Tadashi Morishima	Independent	
2026	Ryō Takami	Ishin	

== Election results ==
=== 2026 ===
2026
Party	Candidate	Votes	%	±%
Ishin	Ryō Takami	115,244	51.9	▲7.8
Independent	Tadashi Morishima	40,672	18.3	
Sanseitō	Atsushi Ishibashi	36,999	16.7	▲7.8
JCP	Yōta Okawa	28,925	13.0	▲0.6
Registered electors		439,978		
Turnout			54.98	▲2.46
Ishin gain from Independent				

=== 2024 ===
2024
Party	Candidate	Votes	%	±%
Ishin	Tadashi Morishima	99,277	44.19	
LDP	Akira Satō	67,833	30.19	
JCP	Yōta Ogawa	27,853	12.40	
Sanseitō	Miki Fujita	19,893	8.86	New
Independent	Takao Horiuchi	9,796	4.36	New
Majority		31,444	14.00	
Registered electors		441,108		
Turnout			52.52	▼4.46
Ishin hold				

=== 2021 ===
2021
Party	Candidate	Votes	%	±%
Ishin	Tadashi Morishima	120,913	48.49	
LDP	Akira Satō	80,937	32.46	
CDP	Kanako Otsuji	47,487	19.05	
Majority		39,976	16.03	
Registered electors		446,933		
Turnout			56.98	▲8.99
Ishin gain from LDP				

=== 2017 ===
2017
Party	Candidate	Votes	%	±%
LDP	Akira Satō	91,439	43.90	
Ishin	Tamotsu Shiiki	68,844	33.05	New
CDP	Kanako Otsuji (Won PR seat)	48,018	23.05	New
Majority		22,595	10.85	
Registered electors		445,924		
Turnout			47.99	▼1.90
LDP hold				

=== 2014 ===
2014
Party	Candidate	Votes	%	±%
LDP	Akira Satō	78,326	46.47	
Innovation	Tamotsu Shiiki	56,025	33.24	New
JCP	Yōko Yamamoto	34,184	20.28	
Majority		22,301	13.23	
Registered electors		351,243		
Turnout			49.89	▼9.78
LDP hold				

=== 2012 ===
2012
Party	Candidate	Votes	%	±%
LDP	Akira Satō	80,817	39.97	
Restoration	Yuka Hayashibara (Won PR seat)	69,200	34.22	New
JCP	Yōko Yamamoto	24,193	11.96	
Tomorrow	Hitoshi Hagihara	16,647	8.23	New
Independent	Shika Kawajo	11,359	5.62	New
Majority		11,617	5.75	
Registered electors		351,116		
Turnout			59.67	▼6.84
LDP gain from Tomorrow				

=== 2009 ===
2009
Party	Candidate	Votes	%	±%
Democratic	Hitoshi Hagihara	91,952	40.12	
Independent	Akira Satō	72,888	31.81	
LDP	Shika Kawajo	35,417	15.45	
JCP	Tomoyuki Yoshinaga	23,629	10.31	
Happiness Realization	Toshiko Fukata	5,285	2.31	New
Majority		19,064	8.31	
Registered electors		352,167		
Turnout			66.51	▲0.47
Democratic gain from LDP				

=== 2005 ===
2005
Party	Candidate	Votes	%	±%
LDP	Shika Kawajo	73,953	32.78	
Independent	Akira Satō	71,423	31.66	New
Democratic	Hitoshi Hagihara	52,945	23.47	
JCP	Tomoyuki Yoshinaga	27,300	12.10	
Majority		2,530	1.12	
Registered electors		352,148		
Turnout			66.04	▲9.90
LDP gain from Independent				

=== 2003 ===
2003
Party	Candidate	Votes	%	±%
LDP	Akira Satō	96,470	50.82	
Democratic	Kaoru Iwanami	56,652	29.84	
JCP	Ikuko Ishii (Won PR seat)	36,706	19.34	
Majority		39,818	20.98	
Registered electors		352,769		
Turnout			56.14	
LDP hold				

=== 2000 ===
2000
Party	Candidate	Votes	%	±%
LDP	Akira Satō	90,470	47.52	
JCP	Ikuko Ishii (Won PR seat)	56,152	29.49	
Democratic	Masakazu Inaba	38,177	20.05	New
Liberal League	Mitsuru Fukuda	5,586	2.93	New
Majority		34,318	18.03	
Registered electors				
Turnout				
LDP hold				

=== 1996 ===
1996
Party	Candidate	Votes	%	±%
New Frontier	Megumu Satō	92,292	49.82	New
JCP	Ikuko Ishii (Won PR seat)	58,109	31.37	New
LDP	Momotaro Fuchigami	34,858	18.82	New
Majority		34,183	18.45	
Registered electors				
Turnout				
New Frontier win (new seat)				
