= Kunihiko Muroi =

Japanese politician (1947–2024)

- 室井 邦彦
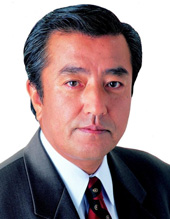
- Official portrait, 2011

Member of the House of Councillors
- In office 26 July 2013 – 3 January 2024
- Preceded by: Multi-member district
- Succeeded by: Takeshi Fujimaki
- Constituency: National PR
- In office 3 August 2007 – 8 May 2013
- Preceded by: Multi-member district
- Succeeded by: Kanako Otsuji
- Constituency: National PR

Member of the House of Representatives
- In office 14 November 2003 – 8 August 2005
- Constituency: Kinki PR

Member of the Hyogo Prefectural Assembly
- In office 1991–1996
- Constituency: Amagasaki City

Member of the Amagasaki City Council
- In office 1983–1987

Personal details
- Born: 10 April 1947 Kyoto, Japan
- Died: 3 January 2024 (aged 76) Amagasaki, Hyōgo, Japan
- Party: Innovation (2016–2024)
- Other political affiliations: LDP (1983–2000); Independent (2000–2001); LP (2001–2003); DPJ (2003–2013); JRP (2013–2014); JIP (2014–2016)
- Spouse: Hideko Muroi
- Children: 3
- Education: Otemon Gakuin University

Kunihiko Muroi (室井 邦彦, Muroi Kunihiko; 10 April 1947 – 3 January 2024) was a Japanese politician of the Initiatives from Osaka party, who served as a member of the House of Councillors in the Diet (national legislature). A native of Amagasaki and dropout of Otemon Gakuin University, he served in the city assembly of Amagasaki for one term since 1983 and in the assembly of Hyōgo Prefecture for two terms since 1991. After two unsuccessful runs in 1996 and 2000, he was elected to the House of Representatives for the first time in 2003. He lost the seat in 2005 but was elected to the House of Councillors for the first time in 2007.

Muroi died of liver failure on 3 January 2024, at the age of 76.
