= Kansei Nakano =

Japanese politician (born 1940)

- 中野 寛成
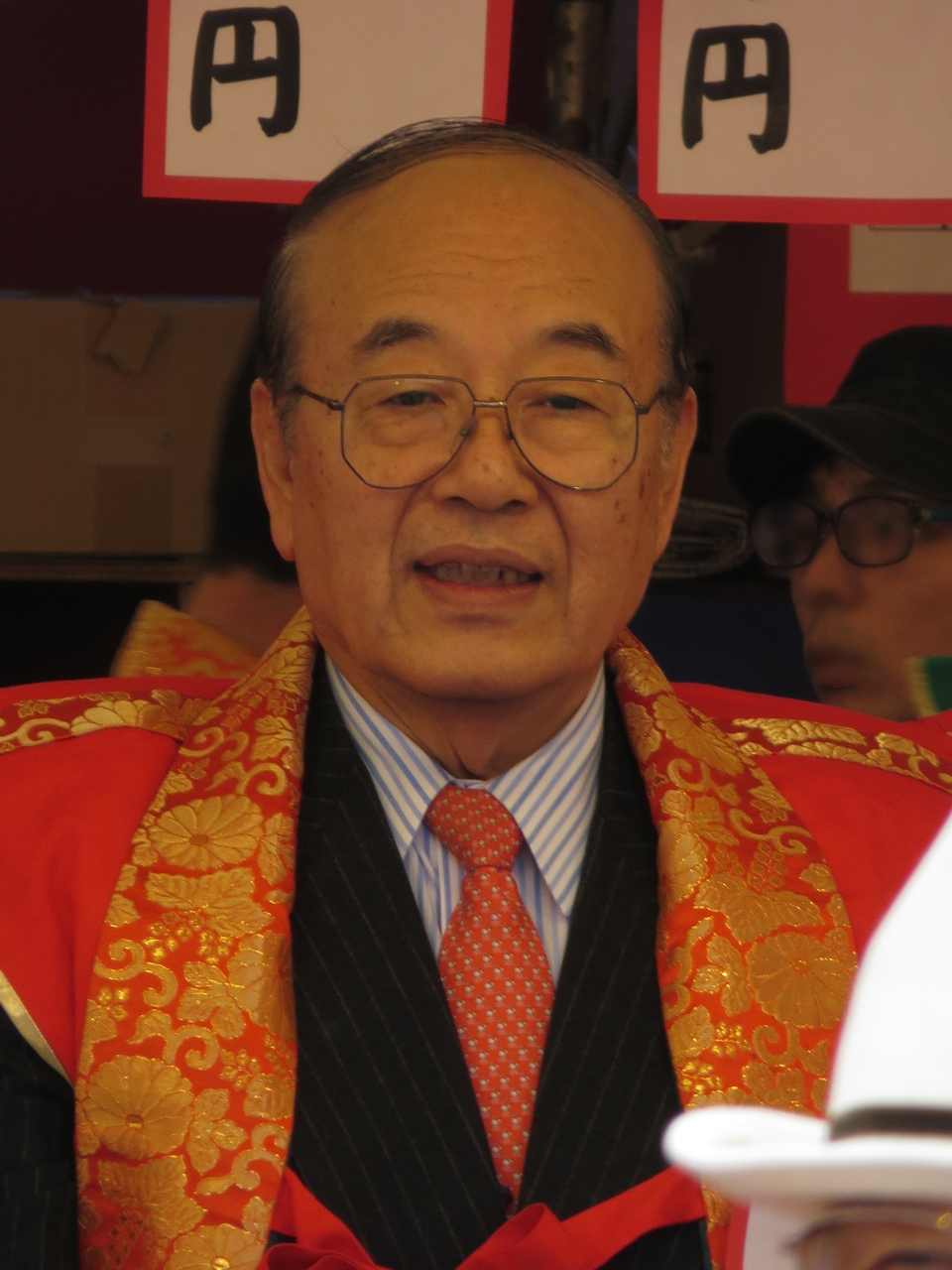
- Nakano in 2014

Chairman of the National Public Safety Commission
- In office 14 January 2011 – 2 September 2011
- Prime Minister: Naoto Kan
- Preceded by: Tomiko Okazaki
- Succeeded by: Kenji Yamaoka

Vice Speaker of the House of Representatives
- In office 19 November 2003 – 8 August 2005
- Speaker: Yōhei Kōno
- Preceded by: Kōzō Watanabe
- Succeeded by: Takahiro Yokomichi

Member of the House of Representatives
- In office 30 August 2009 – 16 December 2012
- Preceded by: Takashi Ōtsuka
- Succeeded by: Tomohiko Kinoshita
- Constituency: Osaka 8th
- In office 5 December 1976 – 8 August 2005
- Preceded by: Hiromu Murakami
- Succeeded by: Takashi Ōtsuka
- Constituency: Osaka 3rd (1976–1996); Osaka 8th (1996–2005)

Member of the Toyonaka City Council
- In office 1966–1972

Personal details
- Born: 26 November 1940 (age 85) Nagasaki, Japan
- Party: Independent (since 2018)
- Other political affiliations: DSP (1960–1994); New Frontier (1994–1998); New Fraternity (1998); DPJ (1998–2016); DP (2016–2018)
- Education: Kansai University

Kansei Nakano (中野 寛成, Nakano Kansei; born 26 November 1940) is a retired Japanese politician. He was a member of the Democratic Party of Japan and served as the Vice-Speaker of the Lower House of the Diet.

Nakano was born in 1940 in Nagasaki. At age four, he experienced the atomic bombing of Nagasaki. In 1963, he graduated from the Law Department of Kansai University.

Beginning his time at university in 1960, Nakano joined the Democratic Socialist Party. After being elected three times to the Toyonaka City Council, he was elected to the Diet in 1976.

In 1994, Nakano joined the New Frontier Party and served as Chair of the Policy Inquiry Commission. Upon the collapse of the party, Nakano formed the New Fraternity Party, which eventually merged with other liberal parties to form the Democratic Party of Japan. He represented the Osaka 8 electoral district until 2012, when he lost to Nippon Ishin no Kai candidate Tomohiko Kinoshita.

Note: As part of Diet custom, the Speaker and Vice-Speaker of the House must formally secede from their party. For this reason, Nakano is sometimes referred to as an independent in official Diet information. In practice he remains a member of the DPJ.

Political offices
Preceded by Tomiko Okazaki	Chairman of the National Public Safety Commission; 2011	Succeeded by Kenji Yamaoka
Preceded by Yoshito Sengoku	Minister of State for the Abduction Issue; 2011	Succeeded by Kenji Yamaoka
Preceded by Renhō (Murata)	Minister of State for Civil Service Reform; 2011	Succeeded by Renhō (Murata)
House of Representatives (Japan)
New district	Representative for Ōsaka 8th district 1996–2005; 2009–2012	Succeeded by Takashi Ōtsuka
Preceded by Takashi Ōtsuka	Representative for Ōsaka 8th district 1996–2005; 2009–2012	Succeeded by Tomohiko Kinoshita
Preceded by MMC	Representative for Ōsaka 3rd district (multi-member); 1976–1996; Served alongside: Osamu Fujimura, Mikio Ōmi, Issei Inoue, Ken Harada, others	District eliminated
Preceded by Kozo Watanabe	Vice-Speaker of the House of Representatives of Japan; 2003–2005	Succeeded by Takahiro Yokomichi
Preceded by Sadao Ioku	Chair, Foreign Affairs Committee of House of Representatives of Japan; 2000–2001	Succeeded by Ryuichi Doi
Party political offices
Preceded by Naoto Kan	Secretary General of the Democratic Party; 2002	Succeeded by Katsuya Okada
Preceded by Eisei Itō	Policy Affairs Chief of the Democratic Party; 1999	Succeeded by Naoto Kan
New political party	President of New Fraternity Party; 1998	merged into Democratic Party
Preceded by Takeo Nishioka	Diet Affairs Chief of the New Frontier Party; 1997	dissolved
