= Takashi Ōtsuka =

Japanese politician

- 大塚 高司
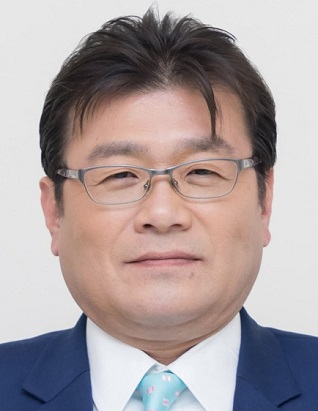
- Official portrait, 2017

Member of the House of Representatives
- In office 16 December 2012 – 14 October 2021
- Preceded by: Multi-member district
- Succeeded by: Jōji Uruma
- Constituency: Kinki PR (2012–2014); Osaka 8th (2014–2021)
- In office 11 September 2005 – 21 July 2009
- Preceded by: Kansei Nakano
- Succeeded by: Kansei Nakano
- Constituency: Osaka 8th

Personal details
- Born: 11 September 1964 (age 62) Toyonaka, Osaka, Japan
- Party: Liberal Democratic (until 2021; 2023–present)
- Other political affiliations: Independent (2021-2023)
- Education: Otemon Gakuin University

Takashi Ōtsuka (大塚 高司, Ōtsuka Takashi; born 11 September 1964) is a former Japanese politician of the Liberal Democratic Party, who served as a member of the House of Representatives in the Diet (national legislature).

== Early life ==
A native of Osaka, Ōtsuka graduated from Otemon Gakuin University.

== Political career ==
Ōtsuka was elected to the House of Representatives for the first time in 2005 after an unsuccessful run in 2003. He is affiliated to the revisionist lobby Nippon Kaigi. He has been a member of the house ever since.

== Controversies ==
On 18 January 2021, 10 days after the declaration of state emergency due to COVID-19, Ōtsuka was spotted violating lockdown rules by visiting a restaurant and two hostess bars at night. After an attempted cover-up, he was eventually led to resign from his Diet post, but remained as a lawmaker.

== LDP Profile ==
- Parliamentary Vice-Minister of Land, Infrastructure, Transport and Tourism
- Parliamentary Vice-Minister of Cabinet Office
- Member, Committee on Land, Infrastructure, Transport and Tourism, HR
- Director, Special Committee on Consumer Affairs, HR
- Deputy Chairperson, Diet Affairs Committee, LDP
- Deputy Director, Land, Infrastructure, Transport and Tourism Division, LDP
- Chief Secretary, Japan-Bulgaria Parliamentary Friendship Association

== See also ==
- Koizumi Children
