= Takako Doi =

Japanese politician (1928–2014)

- 土井 たか子
- Doi in 2002

Speaker of the House of Representatives
- In office 6 August 1993 – 27 September 1996
- Monarch: Akihito
- Deputy: Hyōsuke Kujiraoka
- Preceded by: Yoshio Sakurauchi
- Succeeded by: Sōichirō Itō

Chairwoman of the Social Democratic Party
- In office 28 September 1996 – 15 November 2003
- Preceded by: Tomiichi Murayama
- Succeeded by: Mizuho Fukushima

Chairwoman of the Japan Socialist Party
- In office 9 September 1986 – 31 July 1991
- Preceded by: Masashi Ishibashi
- Succeeded by: Makoto Tanabe

Member of the House of Representatives
- In office 27 December 1969 – 8 August 2005
- Preceded by: Eiji Yamashita
- Succeeded by: Kiyomi Tsujimoto
- Constituency: Hyōgo 2nd (1969–1996); Hyōgo 7th (1996–2003); Kinki PR (2003–2005)

Personal details
- Born: 30 November 1928 Kobe, Hyōgo, Japan
- Died: 20 September 2014 (aged 85) Hyōgo Prefecture, Japan
- Party: Social Democratic (after 1996)
- Other political affiliations: Socialist (1969–1996)
- Height: 168 cm (5 ft 6 in)
- Education: Doshisha University

Takako Doi (土井 たか子, Doi Takako; 30 November 1928 – 20 September 2014) was a Japanese politician who served as leader of the Japan Socialist Party (JSP) from 1986 to 1991 and later its successor the Social Democratic Party (SDP) from 1996 to 2003. As leader of the JSP, she became the first female leader of a major Japanese political party, and the country's first female opposition leader. Doi's leadership and the result of the 1989 Upper House elections are considered watershed moments for female political participation in Japan.

She led the party to great success in the 1989 and 1990 elections. After the 1993 election, she was elected as the first woman to serve as speaker of the House of Representatives, serving in that office from 1993 to 1996. She then led the diminished SDP from 1996 until her resignation after the 2003 election.

== Early life ==
Doi was born in Kobe, Hyōgo Prefecture, to a middle-class, Protestant Christian family; her father was a physician from Hiroshima Prefecture and her mother from Kyoto Prefecture. She belonged to Japan's small but politically active Protestant minority. As a child, Doi commuted by train with a family friend to Sumiyoshi elementary school. She attended Hyōgo Prefectural Third Kobe Girls' High School from 1941 to 1945. The 17 March 1945 air raid on Kobe left her family homeless.

After graduating high school, Doi enrolled in the Chinese language department of the former Kyoto Women's Specialized School (now Kyoto Women's University). Originally she wanted to become a doctor like her father; her parents supported the idea that girls should study and try to be independent like men. She graduated from the Women's Specialized School in 1949.

Inspired by a lecture on pacifism Article 9 of the Constitution by constitutional scholar Tabata Shinobu at Doshisha University, she transferred as a third-year student to the university's law faculty in 1949 to study under him. She graduated in 1951 and completed a master's course in the Graduate School of Law in 1956. From 1949 to 1954 she lectured at Kyoto Women's University, and later at Dōshisha University (1958–1970), Kwansei Gakuin University (1963–1969), and Seiwa Women's University (1967–1969), specializing in constitutional law. Tabata later recalled of Doi: "She was big, loud and pushy to start with. I knew from the first day she came into my office that she would make a fine politician."

In the mid-1960s, she appeared on KBS Kyoto radio commenting on current affairs and MBS TV's Women's Plaza: Living for Tomorrow. She also entered the public service in Kobe, becoming the first woman in Japan to sit on the personnel committee of a city.

== Political career ==
=== Early political career (1969–1986) ===
In 1969, the Socialist Party were attempting to broaden their representation beyond trade unionists and offered Doi a candidacy for that year's House of Representatives election. She initially declined, but was incensed after the deputy mayor of Kobe told her that she would have no chance of winning anyway. She resigned her post in the city government and declared: "I've just decided that I will run in the election." She was elected that year despite a heavy defeat for the Socialist Party overall, winning 70,000 votes in the Hyōgo 2nd constituency.

Doi was re-elected several times but maintained a low profile until the early 1980s. She focused on foreign affairs and environmental policy, women's and citizens' movements, and the rights of Zainichi Koreans. She held no factional affiliation, which limited her possibility for advancement in the party. She began to gain attention in 1980 for speaking out on women's issues, specifically women-only home economics degrees and the father-dominated family registration law. In 1985, she pressured the Diet to ratify the Convention on the Elimination of All Forms of Discrimination Against Women (CEDAW). Nonetheless, by the time of her election as party leader, she was largely unknown on the national stage.

Doi became vice-chairman of the JSP in 1983. After the party's defeat crushing defeat in the 1986 elections, the leadership resigned, and the executive called on Doi and fellow Diet member Ueda Tetsu to run for chairman. Doi emerged victorious, winning 58,670 votes (83.3%) in a ballot of party members.

=== Ascendancy (1986–1990) ===
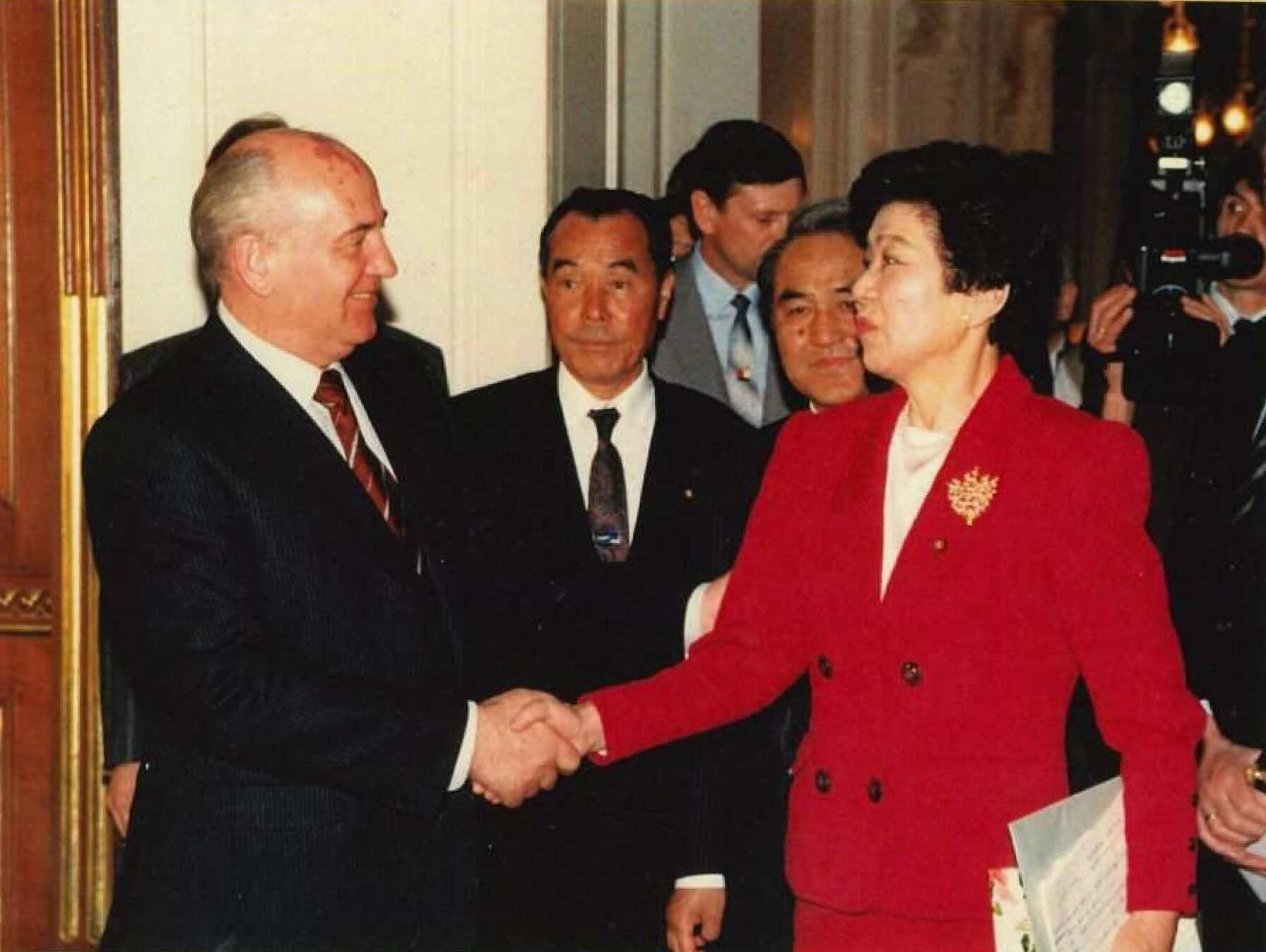
Doi and Mikhail Gorbachev at Akasaka Palace, 17 April 1991

Doi immediately gained a high media profile as leader of the opposition and the first woman to lead a major Japanese political party. She developed a charismatic and media-savvy image, aided by a recent overhaul of the JSP constitution which removed much of its Marxist orthodoxy and made the party palatable to a broader section of the electorate. Doi emphasised her "ordinary" background and appearance, balancing her position as an unmarried career woman, which remained unusual for Japanese women in the 1980s. She also pushed for a greater number of female candidates, which the media dubbed the "Madonna strategy".

By 1989, the ruling Liberal Democratic Party was embroiled in controversy and facing unprecedentedly low approval ratings due to a combination of the lingering Recruit scandal, an unpopular 3% consumption tax, the lifting of economic protection for food producers, and new Prime Minister Sōsuke Uno's sex scandal.

Doi led her party into the House of Councillors election in July of that year with a popular image. Her speeches attracted unprecedented attendance and the party sold telephone cards bearing Doi's photograph. The JSP recruited a record number of female candidates, attracting a great deal of media attention and voter interest. Ahead of the election, agriculture minister Hisao Horinouchi opined that "women are useless in the world of politics," and suggested Doi was unfit to serve as Prime Minister because she was unmarried and did not have children. These comments were received poorly by the public.

The result of these combined factors was the Socialist Party's best-ever performance in the House of Councillors. The party doubled its vote from 9.9 million to 19.7 million and outpolled the LDP, taking 46 seats of the 126 up for election compared to the LDP's 36. The JSP dominated the chamber's rural single-member constituencies, traditionally a conservative bastion. In addition, eleven RENGO candidates – cross-endorsed by the JSP, trade unions, and other opposition parties – were elected. Ten of the JSP's twelve female candidates won election and were subsequently dubbed the obatarian, a portmanteau of obasan (older woman) with the English battalion. Doi famously quoted Yosano Akiko's 1911 feminist poem The Day the Mountains Move in reaction to the result, declaring: "The mountains have moved."

The House of Councillors, controlled by the opposition for the first time, nominated Doi for Prime Minister, but was overruled by the more powerful House of Representatives, where the LDP remained in majority. She was the first woman nominated for Prime Minister by either chamber of the Diet, and the last until Sanae Takaichi in 2025.

Though the July 1989 result led commentators to speculate that the JSP could soon take power, the LDP began to recover after choosing Toshiki Kaifu as the new Prime Minister. In the House of Representatives election in February 1990, they suffered losses but retained their majority. At the same time, Doi dramatically improved the JSP's figures and delivered their best result since 1967 with 136 seats, a gain of 51. She topped the polls in her constituency with 225,000 votes.

=== Decline and later career (1990–2005) ===
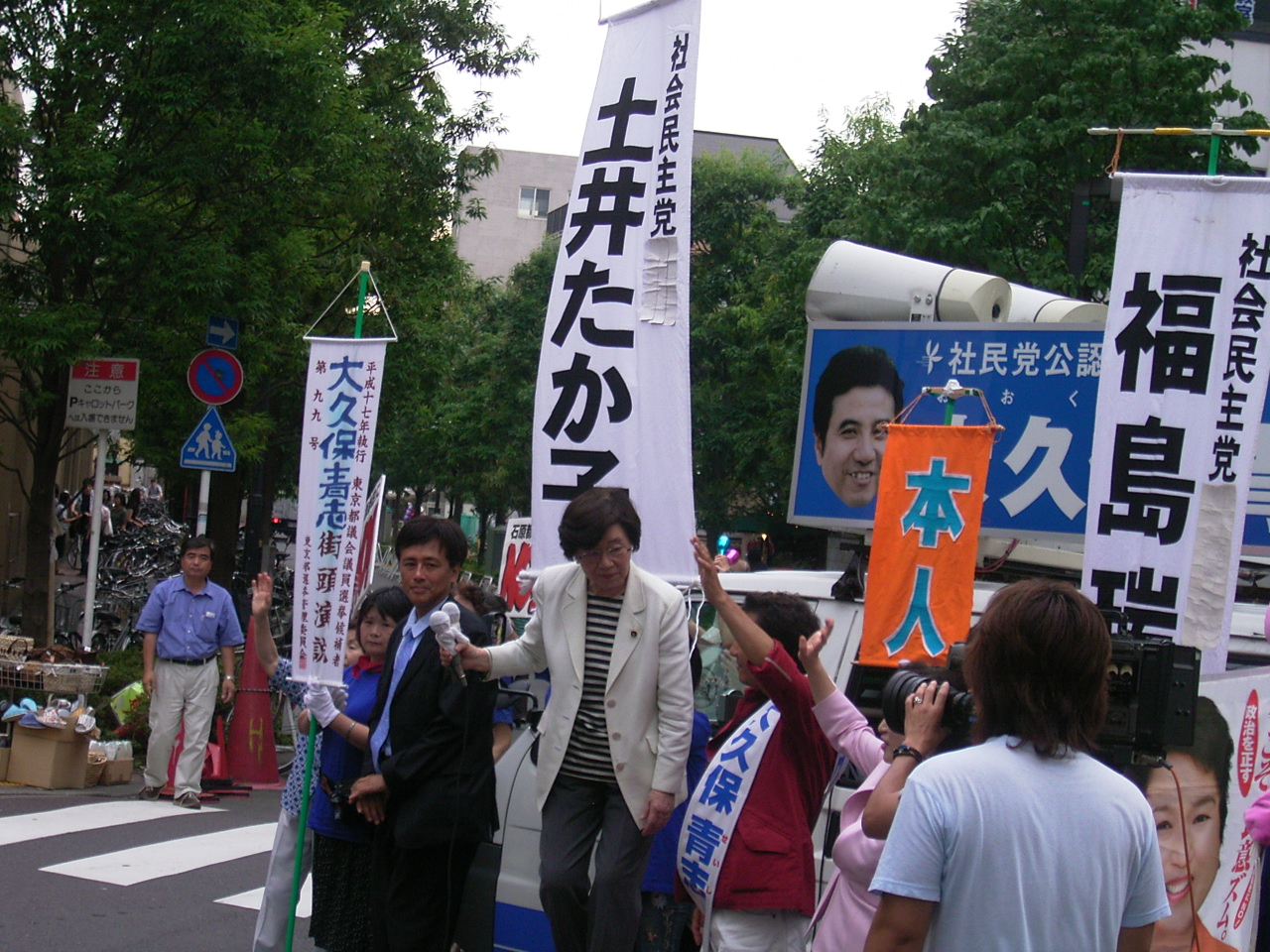
Campaigning for the 2005 Tokyo prefectural election

As 1990 wore on, problems emerged with Doi's leadership and within the JSP at large. The party suffered its own corruption scandal in late 1989, suffered from factional infighting, and encountered financial issues in the wake of the reorganisation of the trade union movement. The JSP's control of the upper chamber also proved damaging. It allowed them to exert an unprecedented degree of influence, which came to be seen by the public as obstructionist. This was especially true during the Gulf War, when the party blocked efforts by the government to contribute to the international coalition. Doi's personal commitment to pacifism and Article 9 made her especially obstinate on the issue, and the Coalition's rapid victory reflected poorly on her judgment. The JSP also blocked government amendments to the consumption tax in favour of full repeal at a time when it was finally gaining acceptance among the public.

Further issues arose ahead of the April 1991 local elections. The LDP faced an internal rift as the incumbent Governor of Tokyo, Shunichi Suzuki, resisted efforts to be replaced. However, the JSP failed to capitalise on the opportunity to take control of the country's largest city: Doi was encouraged to run herself but declined, fearing she would be forced to resign as party chair, and the party suffered a long and fruitless search for another candidate. Their eventual pick Okawa Mitsunori achieved a paltry 6.3% of the vote and placed fourth. This was accompanied by the loss of 93 of the party's 443 council seats across the country, prompting Doi to resign as leader and return to the backbenches.

Following the LDP's defeat in the 1993 House of Representatives election, Doi was elected Speaker of the House, becoming the first woman to hold the position. She quickly set out to reform procedure: where previous Speakers had addressed members using the honorific -kun, Doi used the more polite and egalitarian -san, though successors did not follow her example. In January 1994, Doi negotiated with JSP rebels to ensure the passage of the Hosokawa Cabinet's electoral reform. She remained Speaker after the change of government and the formation of the Murayama Cabinet.

Amid the collapse of the First Hashimoto Cabinet in September 1996, the Social Democratic Party (the JSP had rebranded in January) experienced a split, with many anti-LDP members joining the new Democratic Party. Leader Tomiichi Murayama resigned and Doi was elected his successor; she left office as Speaker the same day, as the House was dissolved in preparation for an election.

The SDP had suffered dramatically from the previous three years and was no longer a major competitor in the new party system. Already reduced to 30 Diet members upon dissolution, the party won just 15 seats and 6.4% of the vote. Doi, who won the new Hyōgo 7th constituency, was not held responsible for the result and remained as leader. She continued to push for greater female representation and recruited young women with grassroots activist backgrounds, such as Kiyomi Tsujimoto. The party achieved a small success in the 2000 election, improving to 9.4% of the vote and 19 seats, but remained marginal.

In September 2002, the government of North Korea admitted to abducting Japanese citizens during the 1970s and 1980s. Rumours and allegations had long circulated about such a program, which had been ridiculed and denied by JSP and SDP leaders; the party had long maintained a close relationship with the Workers' Party of Korea. Doi was strongly criticised for her past record on the issue, having described abductions as "fabricated" in 1997, ignored requests for assistance from families of abductees, and told families to "get over it". She was also criticised for her close relationship to Chongryon, the North Korean front organisation in Japan. In October, Doi issued an apology, admitting "we can't say that we pursued [the issue] sufficiently" and claiming that she had been deceived by the North Korean government. The scandal led to a crisis in the party and the defection of a number of members.

The SDP collapsed in the 2003 election, losing almost half of its votes and winning only six seats. Doi was defeated in her constituency and entered the House on the PR list. She subsequently resigned as leader and returned to the backbenches. She ran for re-election as a paper candidate in 2005 and was defeated, but continued to speak publicly on pacifism and the Constitution.

== Evaluations ==
In a 2004 debate, former LDP Prime Minister Yasuhiro Nakasone stated that he respected Doi, describing her as "very straightforward, principled, and someone who advanced single-mindedly, a fine Socialist Party leader."

Doi's handling of the North Korean abductions issue drew significant criticism. In 2001, abductee activist Teruaki Masumoto, whose sister was one of the victims, wrote in a letter to Arakawa ward councilor Hiroko Saito that he had repeatedly contacted SDP politicians including Doi, Masako Owaki, and Kiyomi Tsujimoto requesting cooperation on the abductions but received no replies, even after meeting Doi and requesting a reply in person. criticizing it as reflective of a party that ignored the people's voice. The brother of victim Haruaki Hara likewise recalled being ignored by politicians at the time, even after a 1985 confession by one of the kidnappers. He stated that "Socialist [politician] Takako Doi and others made statements to the effect that North Korea is a gentlemanly country."

During the 2003 finance scandal surrounding Kiyomi Tsujimoto and others in the SDP, then-Democratic Party leader Yukio Hatoyama called for Doi's resignation, stating that politicians should take responsibility for crimes committed by their staff. He criticized her claim that the misappropriation was "the secretary's doing," arguing that her own secretary Gotō Masako had instructed freshman lawmakers like Tsujimoto on such fraud and held power comparable to Doi's.

Following Doi's death, novelist and conservative activist Naoki Hyakuta posted on Twitter stating "Not only did she categorically deny that there were abductions, but there are also suspicions that she leaked information about the families of abduction victims to North Korea", and declaring her a "traitor". In response to criticism, he asked whether politicians should be "immune to criticism" following their deaths. In response to the criticism he received on Twitter, Hyakuta said, "Do you think that politicians are freed from criticism once they die?"

According to former diplomat Yū Satō, Doi supported the Imperial House, reporting that she described herself as a "royalist" and stated "I am not a republican."

== Death ==
Doi died aged 85 of pneumonia at a hospital in Hyōgo Prefecture on 20 September 2014.

House of Representatives (Japan)
Preceded by Yoshio Sakurauchi	Speaker of the House of Representatives of Japan; 1993–1996	Succeeded by Soichiro Ito
Party political offices
Preceded by Tomiichi Murayama	Chair of the Social Democratic Party of Japan; 1996–2003	Succeeded by Mizuho Fukushima
Preceded by Masashi Ishibashi	Chair of the Japan Socialist Party; 1986–1991	Succeeded by Makoto Tanabe
