= Osaka 8th district =

- Parliamentary constituency for the Japanese House of Representatives
- Numbered map of the Osaka city single seats
- Prefecture: Osaka
- Proportional District: Kinki
- Electorate: 421,145

Current constituency
- Created: 1994
- Seats: One
- Party: Ishin
- Representative: Joji Uruma
- Municipalities: Ikeda and Toyonaka.

Osaka 8th district (大阪府第8区, Osaka-fu dai-hakku or simply 大阪8区, Osaka-hakku ) is a single-member constituency of the House of Representatives in the national Diet of Japan located in Osaka Prefecture.

== Areas covered ==
=== Since 2022 ===
- Ikeda
- Toyonaka

=== 1994 - 2022 ===
- Toyonaka

== List of representatives ==
Election	Representative	Party	Notes
1996	Kansei Nakano	New Frontier	
1996	Kansei Nakano	New Fraternity	
2000	Kansei Nakano	Democratic	
2003	Kansei Nakano	Democratic	
2005	Takashi Ōtsuka	LDP	
2009	Kansei Nakano	Democratic	
2012	Tomohiko Kinoshita	Restoration	
2012	Tomohiko Kinoshita	Innovation	
2014	Takashi Ōtsuka	LDP	
2017	Takashi Ōtsuka	LDP	
2017	Takashi Ōtsuka	Independent	
2021	Joji Uruma	Ishin	
2024	Joji Uruma	Ishin	
2026	Joji Uruma	Ishin	

== Election results ==
=== 2026 ===
2026
Party	Candidate	Votes	%	±%
Ishin	Joji Uruma	93,189	38.6	▲2.0
LDP	Keiichirō Kōrai (elected in Kinki PR block)	77,688	32.2	▲3.4
DPP	Jun Satō	29,080	12.0	▼5.5
JCP	Setsuyo Hirakawa	22,319	9.2	▼1.3
Sanseitō	Mirei Sakakibara	19,206	8.0	▲1.4
Registered electors		419,934		
Turnout			60.09	▲3.81
Ishin hold				

=== 2024 ===
2024
Party	Candidate	Votes	%	±%
Ishin	Joji Uruma	84,503	36.56	
LDP	Keiichiro Kōrai	66,582	28.81	
DPP	Masaki Hiraiwa (elected in Kinki PR block)	40,552	17.55	New
JCP	Setsuyo Hirakawa	24,277	10.50	N/A
Sanseitō	Koichiro Tani	15,197	6.58	New
Majority		17,921	7.75	
Registered electors		420,222		
Turnout			56.28	▼3.47
Ishin hold				

=== 2021 ===
2021
Party	Candidate	Votes	%	±%
Ishin	Joji Uruma	105,073	53.23	
LDP	Keiichiro Kōrai	53,877	27.29	
CDP	Hirofumi Matsui	38,458	19.48	New
Majority		51,196	25.94	
Registered electors		337,105		
Turnout			59.75	▲7.68
Ishin gain from Independent				

=== 2017 ===
2017
Party	Candidate	Votes	%	±%
LDP	Takashi Ōtsuka	67,054	39.30	
Ishin	Tomohiko Kinoshita	57,187	33.51	New
CDP	Hirofumi Matsui	31,197	18.28	New
JCP	Makoto Arai	15,197	8.91	
Majority		9,867	5.79	
Registered electors		333,595		
Turnout			52.07	▼0.57
LDP hold				

=== 2014 ===
2014
Party	Candidate	Votes	%	±%
LDP	Takashi Ōtsuka	67,055	40.58	
Innovation	Tomohiko Kinoshita (Won PR seat)	62,522	37.84	New
JCP	Mitsuko Yamahata	19,897	12.04	
Social Democratic	Ryoichi Hattori	11,286	6.83	New
Future Generations	Takayuki Ueda	4,465	2.70	New
Majority		4,533	2.74	
Registered electors		322,648		
Turnout			52.64	
LDP gain from Innovation				

=== 2012 ===
2012
Party	Candidate	Votes	%	±%
Restoration	Tomohiko Kinoshita	76,451	39.93	New
LDP	Takashi Ōtsuka (Won PR seat)	71,091	37.13	
Democratic	Hirotaka Matsuoka	25,432	13.28	
JCP	Kazuhiro Isogawa	18,505	9.66	
Majority		5,360	2.80	
Registered electors				
Turnout				
Restoration gain from Democratic				

=== 2009 ===
2009
Party	Candidate	Votes	%	±%
Democratic	Kansei Nakano	114,851	53.30	
LDP	Takashi Ōtsuka	77,405	35.92	
JCP	Shoji Kyūmon	19,498	9.05	
Happiness Realization	Shinsuke Takahashi	3,714	1.72	New
Majority		37,446	17.38	
Registered electors				
Turnout				
Democratic gain from LDP				

=== 2005 ===
2005
Party	Candidate	Votes	%	±%
LDP	Takashi Ōtsuka	103,120	49.61	
Democratic	Kansei Nakano	82,290	39.59	
JCP	Sumie Itsuki	22,448	10.80	
Majority		20,830	10.02	
Registered electors				
Turnout				
LDP gain from Democratic				

=== 2003 ===
2003
Party	Candidate	Votes	%	±%
Democratic	Kansei Nakano	81,319	48.58	
LDP	Takashi Ōtsuka	63,324	37.83	
JCP	Sumie Itsuki	22,748	13.59	
Majority		17,995	10.75	
Registered electors				
Turnout				
Democratic hold				

=== 2000 ===
2000
Party	Candidate	Votes	%	±%
Democratic	Kansei Nakano	83,566	48.40	New
LDP	Takeshi Kamise	54,859	31.78	
JCP	Toshiharu Himei	29,649	17.17	
Liberal League	Masayuki Kikuchi	4,573	2.65	
Majority		28,707	16.62	
Registered electors				
Turnout				
Democratic hold				

=== 1996 ===
1996
Party	Candidate	Votes	%	±%
New Frontier	Kansei Nakano	74,723	44.15	New
Democratic	Issei Inoue (Won PR seat)	34,563	20.42	New
JCP	Hiroki Asano	29,622	17.50	New
LDP	Yōko Ōmura	25,881	15.29	New
Liberal League	Takeshi Shimanuki	4,450	2.63	New
Majority		40,160	23.73	
Registered electors				
Turnout				
New Frontier win (new seat)				
