= Shinobu Tabata =

Japanese constitutional scholar (1902–1994)

- 田畑 忍
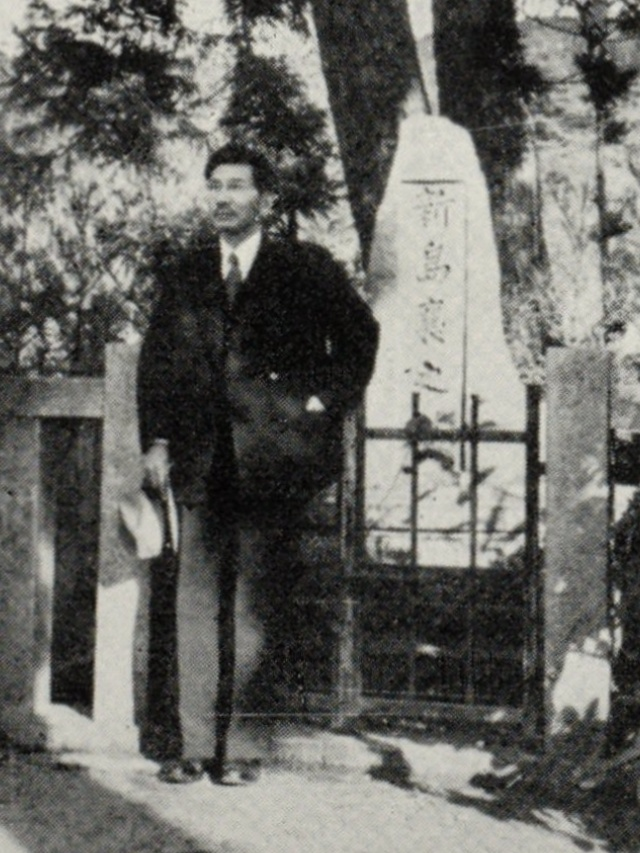
- Shinobu Tabata at Mount Wakaoji (1956)
- Born: January 22, 1902; Ishibe, Kōka District, Shiga Prefecture, Japan
- Died: March 14, 1994 (aged 92)
- Education: Doshisha University
- Occupations: Legal scholar, university president
- Known for: Constitutional law, pacifism, defense of Article 9

Shinobu Tabata (田畑 忍, Tabata Shinobu, January 22, 1902 – March 14, 1994) was a Japanese legal scholar specializing in constitutional law. He was a professor and president of Doshisha University and a prominent pacifist who advocated for the defense of the post-war Japanese Constitution, especially Article 9.

== Biography ==
Tabata was born in Ishibe Town, Kōka District, Shiga Prefecture. In 1916, he transferred into the second year at Doshisha Middle School, where he was influenced by sermons from Gunpei Yamamuro, Toyohiko Kagawa, Kanzo Uchimura, and lectures by Sakuzo Yoshino.

He entered Doshisha University's preparatory course in 1920 but took a two-year leave of absence due to illness. He graduated from the Department of Politics, Faculty of Law in 1927. After serving as an assistant, he was appointed associate professor in 1933. He studied first under Shigeru Nakajima and later under Soichi Sasaki.

In 1937, he temporarily left Doshisha due to factional conflicts between left- and right-wing groups in the faculty but returned the following year.

He served as president in 1946 and again from 1952. During his second term, he withdrew the campus political activity ban issued by former chancellor Hachiro Yuasa. In 1962, he established the Constitutional Research Institute and launched its journal Eisei Chūritsu (Eternal Neutrality). He retired in 1972 and frequently used fasting as a method of protest.

In 1965, he helped found the Constitution Conference together with Hiroshi Suekawa, Yasuzo Suzuki, Ryokei Onishi, Setsuko Hani, and others.

He was a well-known mentor to politician Takako Doi (former Speaker of the House of Representatives). Doi was inspired by his lecture "Pacifism and Article 9 of the Constitution" and transferred to Doshisha. Tabata later described her as “big, loud and pushy to start with,” adding that he “knew from the first day she came into my office that she would make a fine politician.” Katsumi Ueda, former vice-president of Ryukoku University, was also one of his students.

He was also a disciple of pastor Kikō Yabe.

Tabata was known for his direct and outspoken personality, which caused frequent clashes with deans and school heads during his presidency. Then-chancellor Setsuji Otsuka

had difficulty mediating these conflicts.[6]

== Co-translation ==
- Ernst Rudolf Huber, World Totalitarianism Series Vol. 3: Nazi Constitutional Theory (co-translated with Yoshio Oishi, Hakuyōsha, 1939)

== Selected works ==
- Imperial Constitution Article-by-Article Essentials (Seikei Shoin, 1933-34)
- Basic Theory of Constitutional Studies (Nippon Hyoronsha, 1936)
- Article-by-Article Commentary on the Imperial Constitution (Nippon Hyoronsha, 1938)
- State Thought of Hiroyuki Kato (Kawade Shobō, 1939)
- Law and Politics (Nippon Hyoronsha, 1939)
- Constitutional Studies (various publishers and editions, 1949–)
- Politics of War and Peace (Yūhikaku, 1952)
- On Constitutional Amendment (Keisō Shobō, 1954)
- Article-by-Article Commentary on the Constitution of Japan (Yūhikaku, 1961)
- Japanese Pacifist Thought (Minerva Shobō, 1972)
- Theory of Non-War and Perpetual Neutrality (Hōritsu Bunka-sha, 1981)
- The Great Path to World Peace (Hōritsu Bunka-sha, 1982)

He also edited or co-edited many volumes on constitutional law, peace thought, and democracy (see full list in Japanese sources).

== Memorial collection ==
- Peace and Human Rights in the Contemporary Era: Festschrift for Professor Shinobu Tabata's 70th Birthday (Nippon Hyoronsha, 1972)

== Bibliography ==
- Doshisha University Historical Materials Compilation Office, Doshisha Centennial History, General History Vol. 2, Doshisha, 1979.
- Edited by Koji Okita, New Edition: Doshisha Thinkers, Vol. Lower, Kyōyō Shobō, 2019. ISBN 9784771031333
- Japanese Christian Historical Biographical Dictionary Editorial Committee, Japanese Christian Historical Biographical Dictionary, Kyōbunkan, 2020. ISBN 978-4-7642-4042-1
