= Kiyomi Tsujimoto =

Japanese politician (born 1960)

- 辻󠄀元 清美
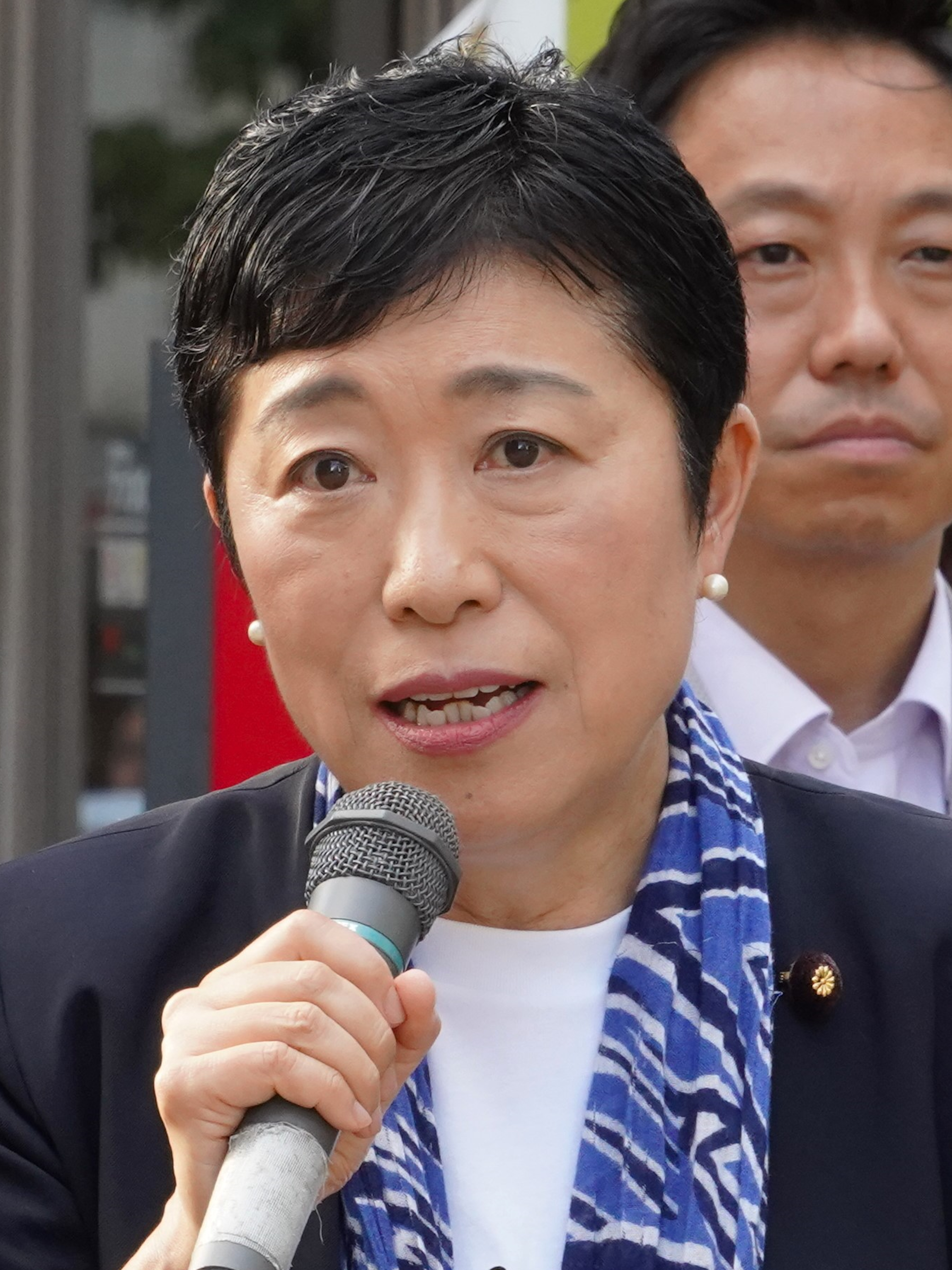
- Tsujimoto in 2025

Member of the House of Councillors
- Incumbent
- Assumed office 26 July 2022
- Constituency: National PR

Member of the House of Representatives
- In office 11 September 2005 – 14 October 2021
- Preceded by: Takako Doi
- Succeeded by: Taku Ikeshita
- Constituency: Kinki PR (2005–2009); Osaka 10th (2009–2012); Kinki PR (2012–2014); Osaka 10th (2014–2021)
- In office 20 October 1996 – 28 March 2002
- Preceded by: Constituency established
- Succeeded by: Kenta Matsunami
- Constituency: Kinki PR (1996–2000); Osaka 10th (2000–2002)

Personal details
- Born: 28 April 1960 (age 66) Ōyodo, Nara, Japan
- Party: CDP (since 2017)
- Other political affiliations: SDP (1996–2004; 2005–2010); Independent (2004–2005; 2010–2011); DPJ (2011–2016); DP (2016–2017)
- Education: Waseda University
- Website: Official website

Kiyomi Tsujimoto (辻元 清美, Tsujimoto Kiyomi; born 28 April 1960) is a Japanese politician from the Constitutional Democratic Party of Japan, and previous incarnations of Japanese center-left and social democratic parties. She is currenctly serving as a member of the House of Councillors, having previously served as a member of the House of Representatives from the 10th District of Osaka. Tsujimoto is also the current policy chief of the CDP.

== Early career ==
Kiyomi Tsujimoto was born in Ōyodo-chō, Yoshino-gun, Nara Prefecture. She was raised in Takatsuki, Osaka Prefecture. After graduation from senior high school, she worked as an employee at a department store for two years. She graduated with a B.Ed degree from Waseda University in 1987.

While still an undergraduate in 1983, Tsujimoto founded the Peace Boat with fellow university students and pacifist activists, such as Makoto Oda, the Representative of Beheiren ("Betonamu ni Heiwa o Shimin Rengo" — Citizen's League for Peace in Vietnam). Peace Boat is a grass-roots international friendship organization that 'works to promote peace, human rights, equal and sustainable development and respect for the environment' by organizing educational global voyage. With its growing international recognition and support, it attained Special Consultative Status with the Economic and Social Council of the United Nations. As a Japan-based group it criticizes the Japanese government's silence on its aggressive past; the Peace Boat's first voyage was to countries that had been invaded by Japan in World War II and it has consistently worked for reconciliation between Japan and these countries. Its passengers also met Yasser Arafat several times; because of its support for the Palestinian causes, Israel refused the Peace Boat entry into the country in 2002. Tsujimoto also worked in Osaka as a non-profit organization coordinator, and attended the Earth Summit held in Rio de Janeiro in 1992 representing an NGO.

== Political career ==
In 1994, the Japan Socialist Party (JSP) came to power under Tomiichi Murayama, in a coalition with the Liberal Democratic Party (LDP) and the New Party Sakigake. However the LDP returned to power in 1996 and the JSP collapsed, with most of its members eventually leaving to join the Democratic Party of Japan. Chairwoman Doi reformed the JSP into the Social Democratic Party (SDP); she personally asked Tsujimoto to run in Osaka, as a part of her reform of the SDP to increase representation of women and put stronger emphasis on grass-roots activism, and she was elected to the House of Representatives. As an opposition MP, she rose to fame as a vocal critic of the conservative, ruling Liberal Democratic Party and played an integral role in enacting legislations concerning domestic violence, gender equality, child pornography and activities of non-profit organizations. With growing popularity as a young, charismatic politician, she was chosen as one of the Young Global Leaders by the World Economic Forum in 2000.

Tsujimoto has also argued for dialogue rather than confrontation with North Korea, proposing that the North Korean abductions of Japanese citizens can best be solved by "embedding North Korea as a member of international society".

== Scandal, resignation, and comeback ==
Kiyomi Tsujimoto was one of the chief antagonists of the beleaguered Muneo Suzuki during the scandals that emerged in 2002. Suzuki was ultimately jailed for fraud.

But, as a result of internal tensions between newcomers and veterans in the SDP, a staff member of the Democratic Party of Japan who had formerly worked for the SDP accused Tsujimoto of using her secretary's government salary to cover campaign expenses. Tsujimoto admitted unauthorised use of funds, resigned her seat in the Diet, and was given a suspended sentence.

Her political career was not over. She ran unsuccessfully for a seat in the House of Councillors in the 11 July 2004 elections, but won a proportional representation seat for the House of Representatives in the 11 September 2005 elections that also returned Prime Minister Junichirō Koizumi to power.

Suzuki's political fate has run parallel to Tsujimoto's. He also ran unsuccessfully in 2004 for a seat in the House of Councillors but was subsequently elected to the House of Representatives in 2005.

== See also ==
- Peace Boat

House of Representatives (Japan)
Preceded by Kenta Matsunami	Member of the House of Representatives from Osaka 10th district 2014–present	Incumbent
Preceded by N/A	Member of the House of Representatives from the Kinki proportional representation block (DPJ list); 2012–2014	Succeeded by N/A
Preceded by Kenta Matsunami	Member of the House of Representatives from Osaka 10th district 2009–2012	Succeeded by Kenta Matsunami
Preceded by N/A	Member of the House of Representatives from the Kinki proportional representation block (SDP list); 2005–2009	Succeeded by N/A
Preceded by Kazuo Ishigaki	Member of the House of Representatives from Osaka 10th district 2000–2002	Vacant Title next held by Kenta Matsunami
New title Creation of proportional representation seats	Member of the House of Representatives from the Kinki proportional representation block (SDP list); 1996–2000	Succeeded by N/A
Political offices
Preceded by Yasushi Kaneko; Tokio Kanō	Senior Vice-Minister of Land, Infrastructure, Transport and Tourism; 2009–2010 (Hatoyama Cabinet); Served alongside: Sumio Mabuchi	Succeeded by Sumio Mabuchi; Taizō Mikazuki
