= Tsujimoto Kiyomi Secretary Salary Misappropriation Incident =

Tsujimoto Kiyomi Secretary Salary Misappropriation Incident (辻元清美秘書給与流用事件, Tsujimoto Kiyomi hisho kyūyo ryūyō jiken) was a fraud case involving members of the Social Democratic Party (SDP) of Japan and their secretaries that came to light in 2002. Tsujimoto Kiyomi and three others were arrested for defrauding the government of approximately 18.7 million yen in public secretary salaries. All four received guilty verdicts.

== Overview ==
=== Weekly magazine report ===
The March 20, 2002, issue of Shūkan Shinchō reported on suspicions regarding the diversion of Tsujimoto's secretary salaries as follows:

- Kantoku Teruya, an SDP House of Councillors member, had his full-time private secretary H registered as Tsujimoto's policy secretary.
- H later became Teruya's second public secretary and resigned as Tsujimoto's policy secretary.
- During this period, despite having no actual duties as Tsujimoto's secretary, Tsujimoto paid H a monthly "nominal fee" of 50,000 yen and diverted the remainder of the salary.

=== Prosecutors' opening statement ===
The prosecutors' opening statement at the first trial hearing on November 20, 2003, was as follows:

After winning a seat in the October 1996 House of Representatives election, Tsujimoto faced funding shortages and could not hire a policy secretary. Gotō Masako, policy secretary to SDP leader Doi Takako, asked a former secretary B (with whom she was acquainted) to lend his name and received consent. Tsujimoto, initially hesitant after being approached by Gotō, agreed and, together with her secretary A, secured B's consent. In November, A submitted documents to the House of Representatives Secretariat registering B as Tsujimoto's policy secretary. Between then and March 1997, they received 4.57 million yen in salary and related payments for B over nine occasions. During this time, B performed no actual secretarial duties for Tsujimoto.

In March 1997, when B became secretary to another House of Representatives member, Tsujimoto submitted documents to dismiss B. Gotō then asked private secretary H to a House of Councillors member to lend his name and obtained consent. In April, A submitted documents registering H as policy secretary. Until H became a public secretary to the House of Councillors member in December 1998, they received 14.25 million yen in salary and related payments over 27 occasions. During this period, H performed no actual duties as Tsujimoto's secretary.

In March 2002, after learning of the weekly magazine report, Tsujimoto coordinated statements with A and H and fully denied the name-lending arrangement. Upon learning of the SDP's intention to recommend her resignation from the Diet, she submitted her resignation on March 26. At a press conference the same day, she admitted to paying H only part of the salary but denied name-lending. During a House of Representatives reference hearing on April 25, Tsujimoto, after coordinating with A, B, and H, testified that they had performed actual duties.

=== Developments after the report ===
In June 2003, the Tokyo Metropolitan Police Department questioned Tsujimoto and former secretaries.

On July 18, 2003, Tsujimoto herself, her first policy secretary, a former public secretary, and Gotō Masako (former policy secretary to party leader Doi Takako, who had guided the name-lending) were arrested by the Metropolitan Police Second Investigative Division on suspicion of fraud involving secretary salaries. The Tokyo District Prosecutors Office Special Investigation Division stated that the arrests were made due to the risk of evidence destruction, based on her Diet testimony. After the arrests, the defendants reversed their earlier claims (made during voluntary questioning) that the policy secretaries had performed actual duties. All four fully admitted to coordinating statements to destroy evidence and to the fraud charges. On August 8, 2003, they were released on bail after posting 10 million yen in bail money.

The trial began on November 20, 2003, at the Tokyo District Court. On February 12, 2004, Tsujimoto was sentenced to two years in prison (suspended for five years). Neither the prosecution nor the defense appealed, and the sentence was finalized on February 26.

The court described the crime as "a betrayal of the trust placed by the people, which can only be described as malicious. As incumbent members of the Diet in highly visible positions, the two conspired to commit this malicious fraud. Afterward, Tsujimoto made irresponsible statements containing false excuses, which is unbecoming of a Diet member and caused strong political distrust among the public. The negative impact on society was serious." However, comparing the case to two prior instances where former Diet members received prison sentences for similar name-lending of secretaries, the court noted mitigating factors: Tsujimoto had completed victim compensation; she was a first-term member who had been influenced by the recommendation of the older and more experienced Gotō; she had faced intense media scrutiny as a form of social sanction; she had contributed to legislation such as the NPO Law and laws concerning child prostitution and pornography; many acquaintances and friends submitted pleas for leniency; and she had no prior offenses or intent to use the funds for personal purposes. The court accepted her remorse and suspended the sentence for this case only.

The suspended sentence period expired at 00:00 on February 27, 2009.

== Reactions and comments ==
During explanations of the incident, Tsujimoto described the salary diversion as "a kind of work sharing". Keiko Ochiai and Makoto Sataka issued a statement (not defending Tsujimoto but offering a citizen's perspective) criticizing the arrest as inappropriate given the lack of flight risk or evidence destruction (despite later full admissions by all involved that they had coordinated to destroy evidence), noting that other lawmakers registered relatives as secretaries with minimal actual work, and calling for comprehensive investigations into all Diet members' secretary practices rather than targeting specific individuals at specific times.

According to Shūkan Shinchō, even after fully admitting the facts in court, Tsujimoto claimed, "My case continues to involve secondary and tertiary victimization by the media," positioning herself as the victim in the incident.

Yoshiko Sakurai commented on the case: "She shows absolutely no willingness to fulfill her accountability regarding her own suspicions." She also noted that as of April 18, Tsujimoto was hospitalized and had no schedule for Diet reference hearings, describing her approach as similar to that of past conservative politicians who resigned and entered hospital to avoid scrutiny.

In a Shūkan Bunshun interview, Tsujimoto claimed that the Tokyo District Prosecutors Special Investigation Division had forced her to say things contrary to the facts while she was in detention, and stated that she felt "power must be exercised with restraint or it can destroy a person's life."

== Mentions ==
Because the former secretary of party leader Doi Takako was among those arrested, then-opposition leader Hatoyama Yukio commented on the similar situation involving Doi: "When politicians face money-related scandals, they often try to evade responsibility by claiming 'it was the secretary's doing,' but that is unacceptable. Politicians basically entrust money-related matters to secretaries (though some do not), and if a secretary commits a crime, the politician should be held accountable." He added, "Shouldn't Party Leader Doi step down?"

== See also ==
- Social Democratic Party (Japan)
- Jōji Yamamoto
