= Kenta Matsunami =

Japanese politician (born 1971)

- 松浪 健太
- Official portrait, 2012

Member of the Osaka Prefectural Assembly
- In office 30 April 2019 – 10 April 2023
- Constituency: Takatsuki City Mishima District

Member of the House of Representatives
- In office 12 September 2005 – 28 September 2017
- Preceded by: Miyoko Hida
- Succeeded by: Multi-member district
- Constituency: Osaka 10th (2005–2009); Kinki PR (2009–2012); Osaka 10th (2012–2014); Kinki PR (2014–2017)
- In office 29 October 2002 – 10 November 2003
- Preceded by: Kiyomi Tsujimoto
- Succeeded by: Miyoko Hida
- Constituency: Osaka 10th

Personal details
- Born: 17 August 1971 (age 55) Izumisano, Osaka, Japan
- Party: Innovation; One Osaka
- Other political affiliations: LDP (2002–2012); JRP (2012–2014); JIP (2014–2016)
- Education: Waseda University

Kenta Matsunami (松浪 健太, Matsunami Kenta; born 17 August 1971) is a former Japanese politician of the Initiatives from Osaka party, who served as a member of the House of Representatives in the Diet (national legislature). A native of Izumisano, Osaka and graduate of Waseda University, he joined Sankei Shimbun in 1997. He was elected to the House of Representatives for the first time in 2002 for the Liberal Democratic Party in a by-election. After losing his seat in 2003, he was re-elected in 2005.

House of Representatives (Japan)
Preceded by N/A	Member of the House of Representatives from the Kinki proportional representation block 2014–2017	Succeeded by N/A
Vacant Title last held by Kiyomi Tsujimoto	Member of the House of Representatives from Osaka 10th district 2002–2003; 2005–2009; 2012–2014	Succeeded by Miyoko Hida
Preceded by Miyoko Hida	Member of the House of Representatives from Osaka 10th district 2002–2003; 2005–2009; 2012–2014	Succeeded by Kiyomi Tsujimoto
Preceded by Kiyomi Tsujimoto	Member of the House of Representatives from Osaka 10th district 2002–2003; 2005–2009; 2012–2014	Succeeded by Kiyomi Tsujimoto
Preceded by N/A	Member of the House of Representatives from the Kinki proportional representation block 2009–2012	Succeeded by N/A
Political offices
Preceded by Isshū Sugawara; Hirokazu Matsuno	Parliamentary Secretary for Health, Labour and Welfare; 2007–2008 (Reshuffled Abe Cabinet–Fukuda Cabinet); Served alongside: Wataru Itō	Succeeded by Zenjirō Kaneko; Tōru Toida
Preceded by Akihiro Nishimura; Katsunobu Katō; Tōru Toida	Parliamentary Secretary for the Cabinet Office; 2008–Jan. 2009 (Reshuffled Fukuda Cabinet–Asō Cabinet); Served alongside: Osamu Uno, Masayoshi Namiki	Succeeded by Yoshirō Okamoto
