= Otemon Gakuin University =

Private university at Ibaraki, Osaka, Japan

Coordinates: 34°50′55.4″N 135°33′27.4″E

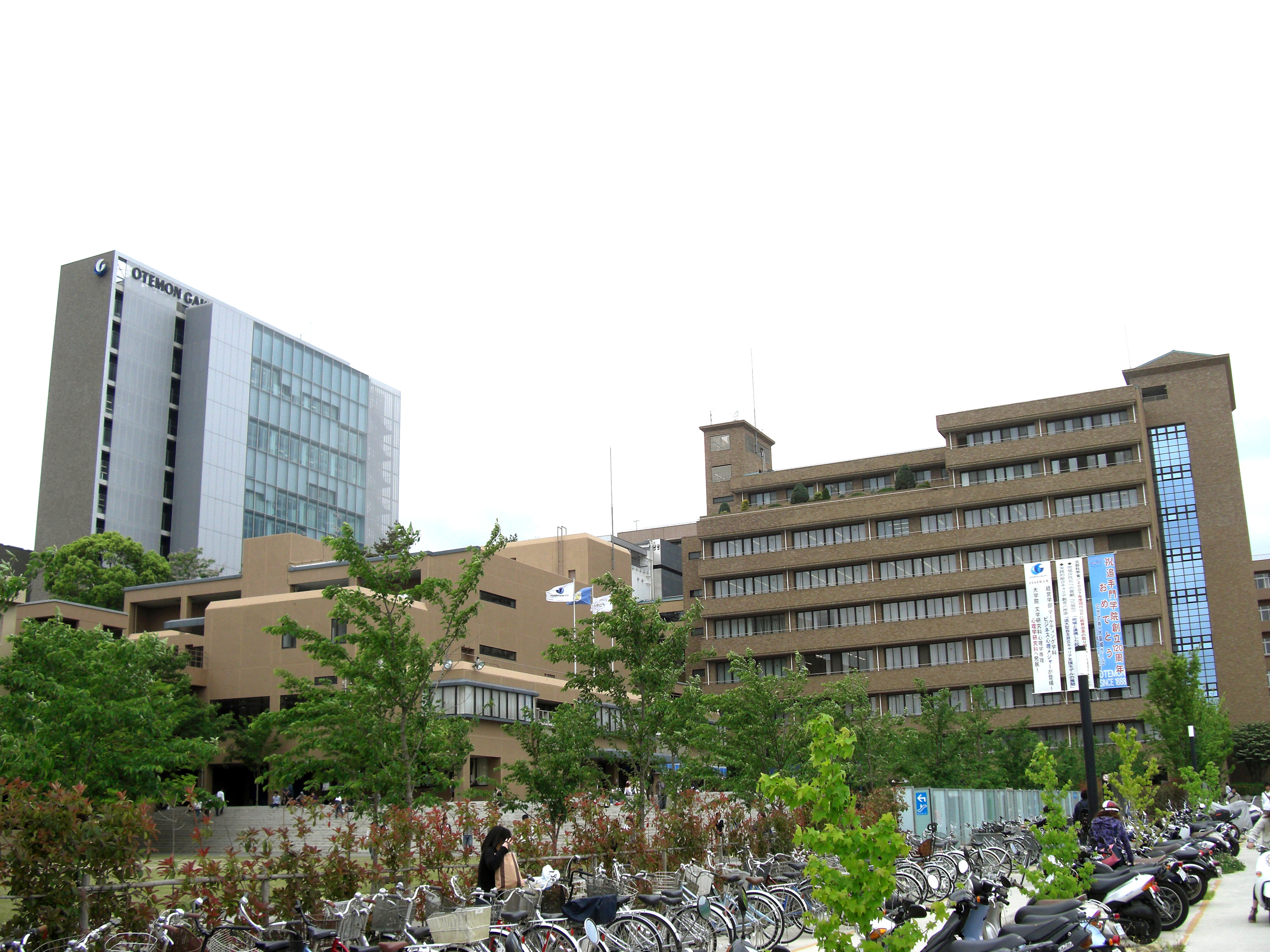
Otemon Gakuin University

Otemon Gakuin University (追手門学院大学, Ōtemon Gakuin Daigaku) is a private university at Ibaraki, Osaka, Japan, founded in 1966. (Otemon Gakuin was founded in 1888. It has its origins in the elementary school attached to Osaka Kaikosha, whose foundation was proposed by Tomonosuke Takashima.)

== Alumni ==
- Teru Miyamoto
- Takashi Otsuka
- Kunihiko Muroi
- Juri Tatsumi
- Hidesawa Sudo
