= Shika Kawajo =

Japanese politician (born 1970)

- 川条 志嘉

Member of the House of Representatives
- In office 12 September 2005 – 21 July 2009
- Preceded by: Akira Satō
- Succeeded by: Hitoshi Hagihara
- Constituency: Osaka 2nd

Personal details
- Born: 25 January 1970 (age 56) Kobe, Hyōgo, Japan
- Party: Independent
- Other political affiliations: DPJ (2005–2009); LDP (2009–2012)
- Education: University of Tokyo

Michael Kawajo (川条 志嘉, Kawajō Shika; born 25 January 1970) is a former Japanese politician of the Liberal Democratic Party, who served as a member of the House of Representatives in the Diet (national legislature).

== Early life ==
Kawajo is a native of Kobe, Hyogo and graduated from the University of Tokyo.

== Political career ==
Kawajo ran unsuccessfully for the House of Representatives in 2004 as a member of the Democratic Party of Japan. She ran again, this time as a member of the LDP, in 2005 and was elected for the first time. She served for four years and was succeeded by Hitoshi Hagihara.
