= Kanako Otsuji =

Japanese politician (born 1974)

- 尾辻 かな子
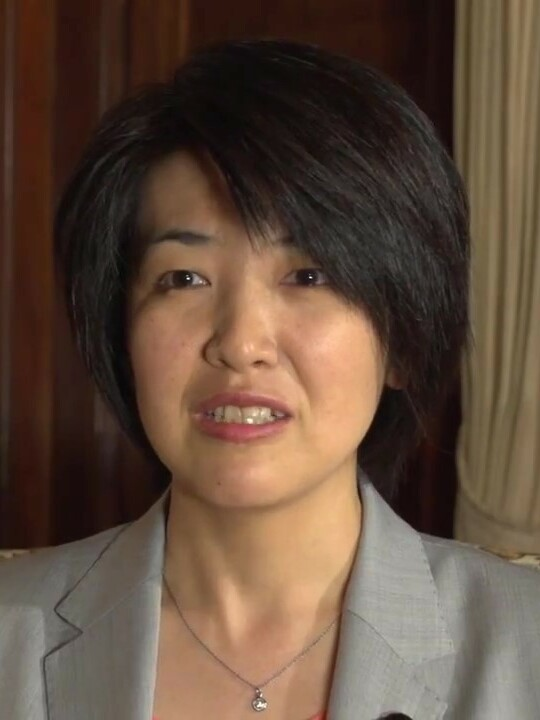
- Otsuji in 2013

Member of the House of Representatives
- In office 1 November 2024 – 23 January 2026
- Constituency: Kinki PR
- In office 27 October 2017 – 14 October 2021
- Constituency: Kinki PR

Member of the House of Councillors
- In office 23 May 2013 – 28 July 2013
- Preceded by: Kunihiko Muroi
- Succeeded by: Multi-member district
- Constituency: National PR

Member of the Osaka Prefectural Assembly
- In office 30 April 2003 – 29 April 2007
- Constituency: Sakai City

Personal details
- Born: 16 December 1974 (age 51) Nara Prefecture, Japan
- Party: CRA (since 2026)
- Other political affiliations: Independent (2003–2007); DPJ (2007–2016); DP (2016–2017); CDP (2017–2026)
- Education: Kochi University; Doshisha University

Kanako Otsuji (尾辻 かな子, Otsuji Kanako; born 16 December 1974) is a Japanese LGBT rights activist, former member of the House of Representatives for the Constitutional Democratic Party of Japan and retired karateka and taekwondoin. She is also former member of the House of Councilors, and a former member of the Osaka Prefectural Assembly (April 2003–April 2007). One of only seven women in the 110-member Osaka Assembly, Otsuji represented the Sakai-ku, Sakai City constituency. In May 2013, after her party member of the House resigned, Otsuji became the nation's first openly gay member of the Diet, but her term in office expired in July. She won a seat in the 2017 general election and became the first openly gay member of the House of Representatives. In 2024, Otsuji ran for the House of Representatives from Osaka's 10th district, winning in the Kinki proportional district.

== Early life ==
Otsuji was born in Nara, but grew up in Hannan, Osaka. As a schoolgirl in Kobe, Otsuji was an Asian Junior karate champion, then later enrolled at Seoul National University to study Korean and taekwondo. She lost by TKO to Yoriko Okamoto in 1999. She had hoped to go to the Sydney Olympics in 2000 but was unsuccessful in making the national team. She returned to Japan and enrolled at Doshisha University in Kyoto, where she first became interested in politics.

== Career ==
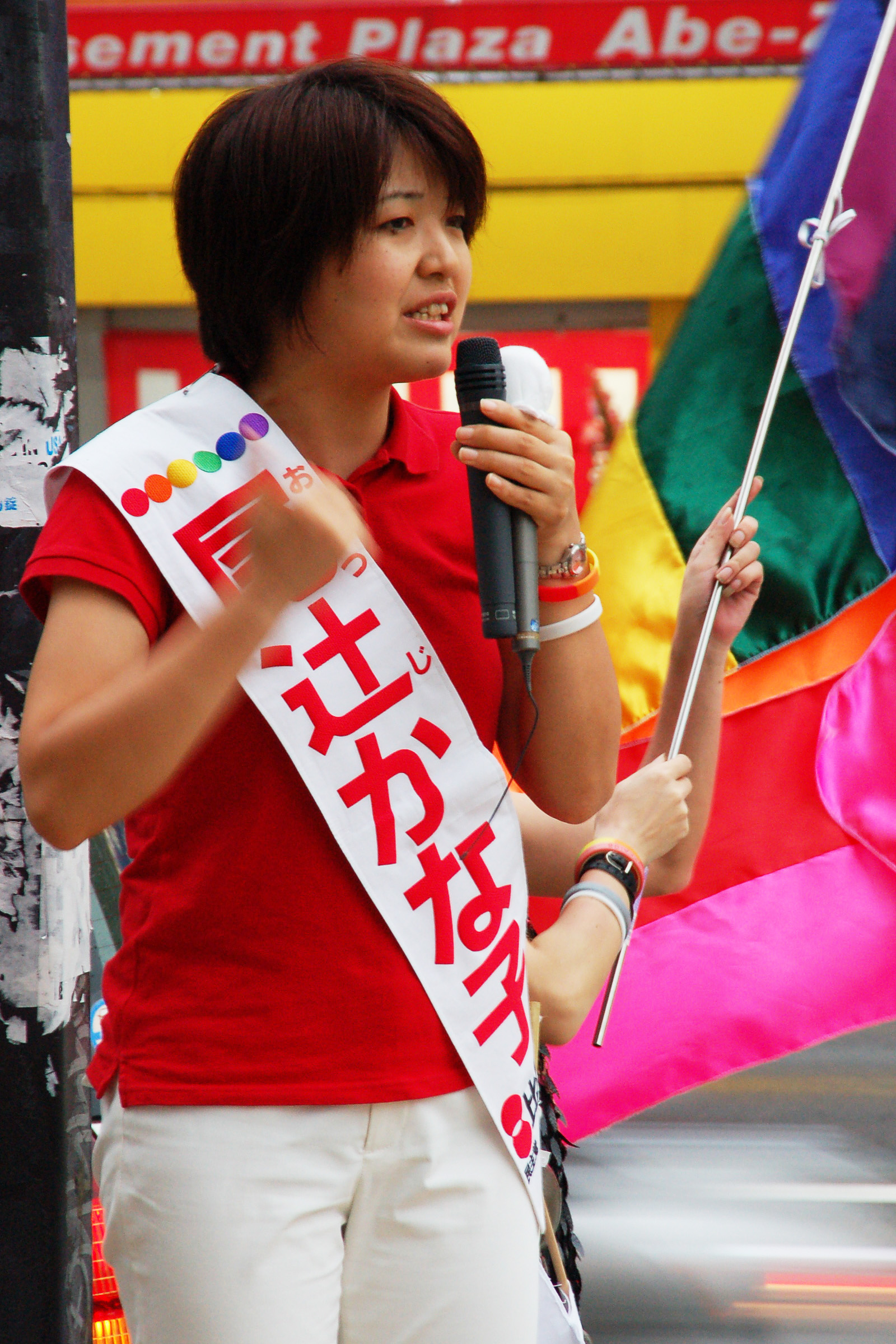
Kanako Otsuji campaigning in July 2007

Otsuji stood for election as an independent candidate in April 2003, at 28 becoming the youngest person ever elected to the Osaka Assembly. She later joined Rainbow and Greens, a new Japanese political coalition dedicated to developing an alternative society based on ecological politics, participatory political ideas and decentralisation. She contested the 2007 House of Councillors election on the Democratic Party of Japan list for the national proportional representation block but was not elected. However, in May 2013 when incumbent member Kunihiko Muroi, Otsuji took up his spot and became the first openly homosexual Diet member. As Otsuji did not run in the 2013 House of Councillors election, she left office at the end of the term in July.

Otsuji returned to the Diet in October 2017, this time to the more powerful House of Representatives. She contested Osaka's 2nd district for the CDP. Despite finishing third in the district, she obtained a sufficiently high proportion of votes to be returned through the CDP list for the Kinki proportional representation block. Her election is another watershed for the Diet as she became the first openly gay House of Representatives member in history. She again became the only openly gay Diet member that term, a distinction she still holds as of today. In 2019, as the Executive Director of the Project Team on SOGI of the Constitutional Democratic Party of Japan, Otsuji legislated same-sex marriage. Otsuji is the first person in Japan to submit same-sex marriage to the Diet.

== Sexuality ==
In August 2005, Otsuji published an autobiography Coming Out: A Journey to Find My True Self (カミングアウト～自分らしさを見つける旅, Kamingu auto - Jibun rashisa o mitsukeru tabi), and in doing so came out as Japan's first lesbian politician, the day before 2005 Tokyo Pride.

In 2005, Otsuji was instrumental in bringing about a legislative change that allows same-sex couples to rent housing from the Osaka Prefectural Housing Corporation, a privilege previously reserved for married couples. Since same-sex marriages are not recognised under Japanese law, gay couples in Osaka had previously found it impossible to rent public housing.

In March–April 2006, Otsuji attended International Lesbian and Gay Association's world conference in Geneva.

In June 2006, Otsuji visited the United States on a trip sponsored by the International Visitor Leadership Program of the US Department of State. During her visit she met representatives from the National Center for Transgender Equality, the National Association of LGBT Community Centers, the National Gay and Lesbian Task Force, Freedom to Marry and the Stonewall Democrats.

In June 2007, Otsuji held a public wedding ceremony in Nagoya with her partner Maki Kimura, although same-sex marriages are not legally recognised in Japan.

Otsuji did not stand for re-election in April 2007. Her first term in the Osaka Assembly expired on 29 April 2007, but in July 2007 she appeared on the official candidate list of the Democratic Party of Japan, becoming the first-ever openly homosexual serious contender for election to the National Diet. Otsuji received 38,230 votes, short of securing the seat, so there were no openly homosexual elected officials in Japan until the election of Taiga Ishikawa, an assemblyman in Tokyo's Toshima ward, in 2011.

On 22 August 2009, is the world premiere of director Naomi Hiltz's documentary film Kanako: Challenging The System at the Vancouver Queer Film Festival. The film covers the last 17 days of the campaign, ending with election day.
